= Thomas Chafe =

Thomas Chafe may refer to:

- Thomas Chafe (Totnes MP) (c. 1611–1662), MP for Totnes, 1660
- Thomas Chafe (Bridport MP) (c. 1642–1701), his son, MP for Bridport, 1685–1688
