= Abraham Blooteling =

Dutch designer and engraver

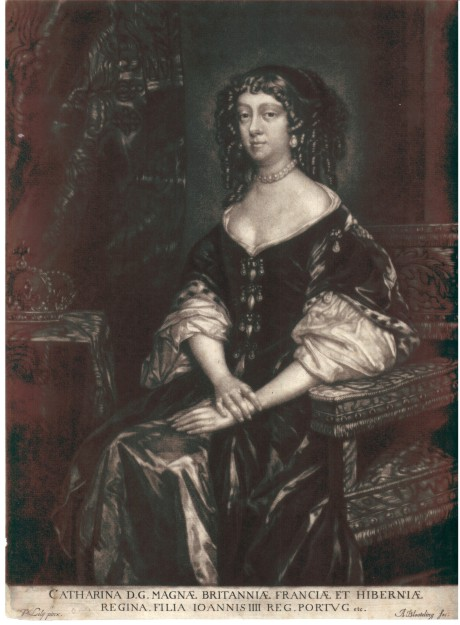
Catherine of Braganza, mezzotint, 1672, after Peter Lely.

Abraham Blooteling (or Bloteling) (1634–1690) was a Dutch designer and engraver.

== Life ==
He was born at Amsterdam. From the style of his etchings it is likely that he was a pupil of the Visschers. Following the French incursions into the Netherlands in 1672, he went to England, where he met with some success, but only stayed for two or three years.

Blooteling produced a large number of etchings, some line engravings, and also worked in mezzotint, a technique he is known to have adopted by 1671. He has sometimes been credited with the invention of the "rocker" as a tool for the preparation of mezzotint plates, and with introducing the technique into England.

In 1685 he published the collection of gems of Leonardo Agostini, etched by himself. He sometimes signed his plates with his name at length, and sometimes with a monogram, composed of the letters 'A' and 'B'. Bloteling was a bachelor and a friend of Gerard de Lairesse, who also lived on Prinsengracht.

== Etchings and engravings ==
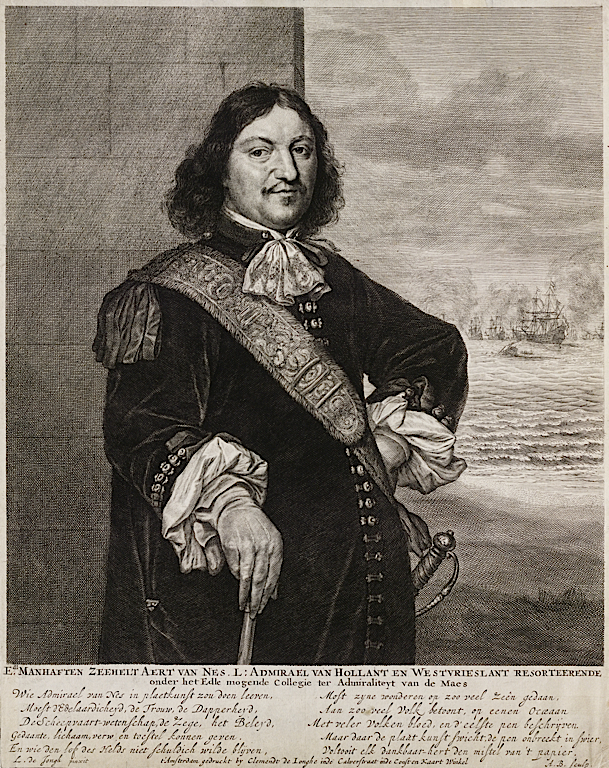
Abraham Blooteling after Ludolf de Jongh, Admiral Aert van Nes, late 1600s, engraving, Department of Image Collections, National Gallery of Art Library, Washington, DC.

=== Portraits ===
- Thomas Sydenham, Bishop of Worcester; after Mrs Beale.
- John Wilkins, Bishop of Chester; after the same.
- Anthony, Earl of Shaftesbury; after Greenhill.
- Edward, Earl of Sandwich; after Lely.
- Edward, Earl of Montagu; after the same.
- James, Duke of Monmouth; after the same.
- Cornelis Tromp, Admiral of Holland; after the same.
- Prince Rupert; after the same. 1673.
- Aert van Nes, Admiral of Holland; L. de Jonghe pinx.
- Constantijn Huygen; after Netscher.
- John Henry Thim; A. Stech pinx.
- Jerome de Beverningh; after Vaillant.
- Willem van Haren; after the same. 1680.
- Egbert Meesz Kortenaer, Admiral of Holland; Bart. van der Helst pinx.
- The Marquis de Mirabelle; after Van Dyck.
- Ferdinand de Fürstenberg, Bishop of Paderborn; A. Blotelinq sc. 1669.
- Michel Adriaensz de Euyter, Admiral; Bloteling fec. aqua forti.
- Sir Thomas More, Lord High Chancellor.
- Edward Stillingfleet, Canon of St. Paul's.
- Henry, Duke of Norfolk. 1678.
- Jane, Duchess of Norfolk. 1681.
- Augustus Stellingwerf, Admiral of Friesland.
- Cornelis de Wit, Vice Admiral of Holland.
- Tierck Hides de Fries, Admiral of Friesland.
- Cornelis Speelman, Vice Admiral.

=== Various subjects after his own designs and other masters ===
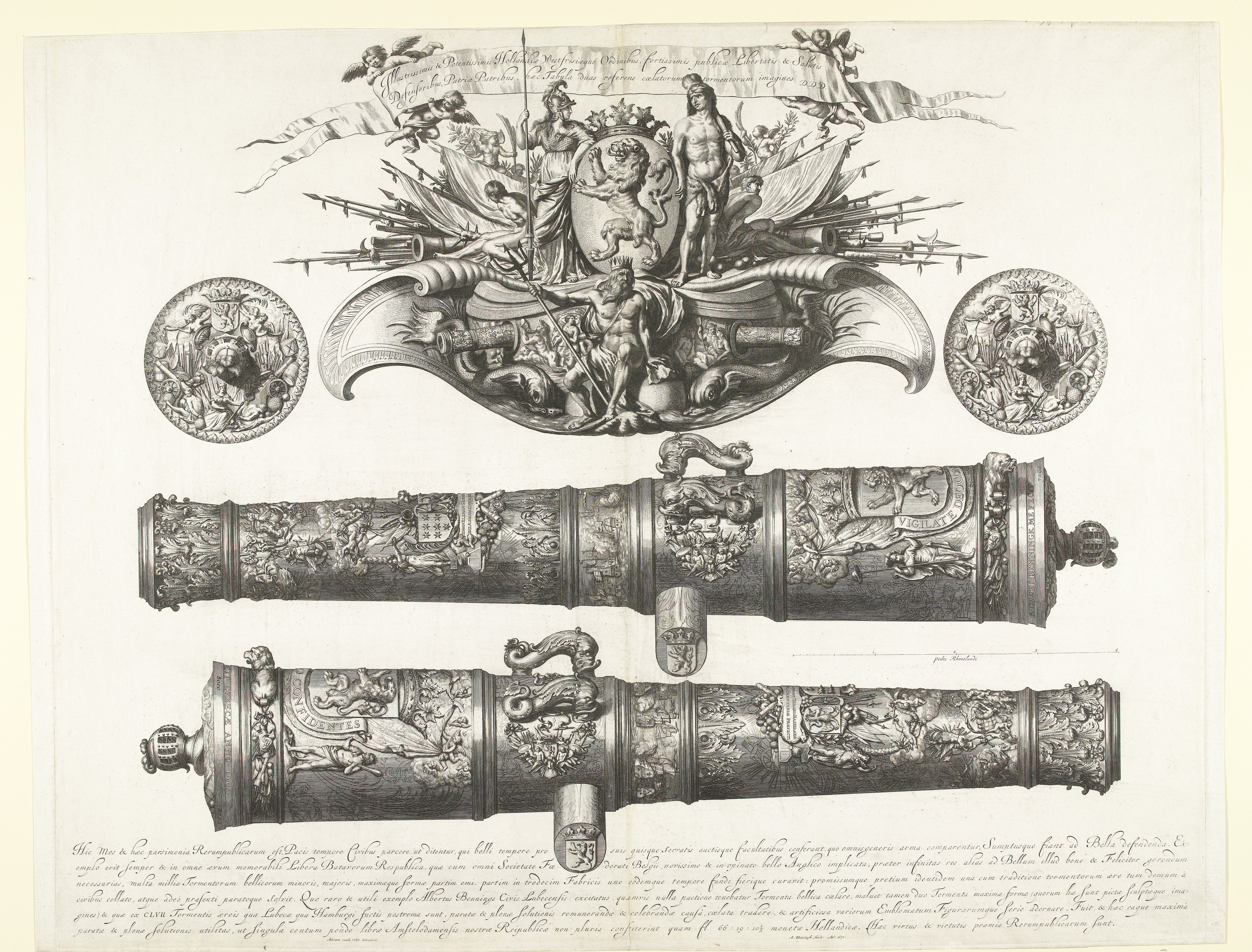
Two 48-pounders cast at Lübeck by Albert Benningk for the States-General of the Netherlands in 1669; engraving from 1671.

- Twelve Views of Gardens; inscribed Alcune Vedute, etc.
- Eighteen circular plates of subjects of sacred history, with flowers; A. Bloteling fec.
- A Landscape, with Diana bathing; J. van Neck pinx.; A. Bloteling exc.
- A Landscape, with Alpheus and Arethusa; the same.
- Six Views of the Environs of Amsterdam; Jac. Ruisdael inv.; A. Bloteling fee. 1670.
- Actaeon devoured by his Dogs; G. Flink pinx.
- A Shepherd playing on his Pipe, with a Shepherdess; after the same.
- The Golden Age; G. Lairesse pinx.; N. Visscher exc.
- The Marriage of St. Catharine; after Raphael.
- Two Heads of Children; after Rubens; rare; some impressions have the name of Rubens.
- The Study of the Head of a Man; after Rubens; A. Bloteling fec. et exc; rare.
- Four Studies of Lions; after Rubens; inscribed Varice Leonum Icones, a P. P.
- Two Huntings of the Boar and Stag; fine.

== Mezzotints ==
=== Portraits ===
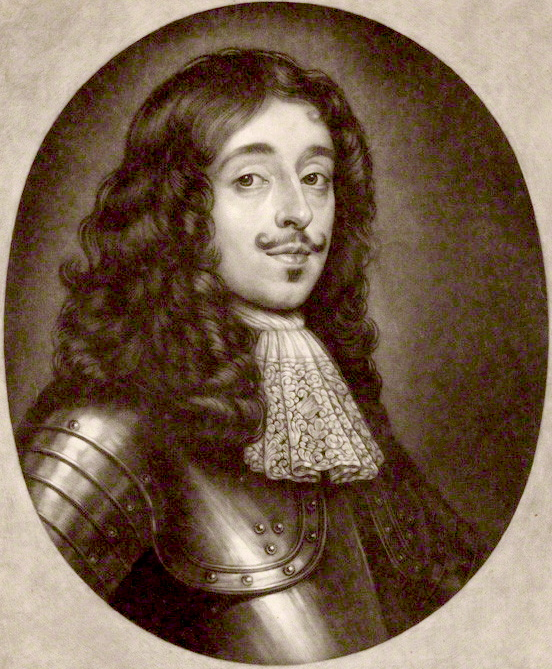
Charles Stanley, 8th Earl of Derby, mezzotint.

- Justus Lipsius; A. Bloteling fec.
- Michelangelo Buonarroti; A. Bloteling fec.
- Frans Mieris, painted by himself; A. Bloteling fee.
- Jan de Wit, Grand Pensionary of Holland; after de Baen.
- Cornelis de Wit, the brother of Jan; after de Baen.
- Staverinus, an old Jew, holding a Medal: Corn. Bega pinx.
- Titus Oates; Hawker pinx.
- Desiderius Erasmus; H. Holbein pinx, 1671.
- Henry Bennet, Earl of Arlington; after Lely; oval.
- Charles, Earl of Derby; after the same. (pictured)
- Abraham Symmonds, an artist; after the same.
- Queen Catharine; after the same. (pictured)
- William Henry, Prince of Orange; after the same. 1678.
- Nell Gwyn; P. Lely pinx.
- Mary of Modena, Duchess of York; after the same.
- Cornelis Tromp, Admiral of Holland; after the same.
- Michiel Adriensz de Ruijter, Admiral of Holland; J. Lievens pinx.
- The Emperor Leopold I; C. Morad pinx.
- Henry Casimir, Prince of Nassau; M. van Muscher pinx. (pictured)
- Portrait of a Venetian Lady; Titiano inv.
- Constantijn Huygens; B. Valliant pinx.
- Jan de Oronefeld; after the same.

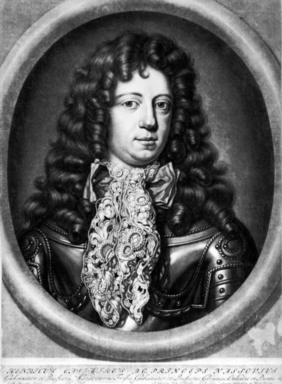
Henry Casimir II, Prince of Nassau-Dietz. Mezzotint, ca. 1690

=== Various subjects from his own designs and other masters ===
- The Five Senses; after C. Bega.
- The Four Ages; circular; after the same.
- Hercules destroying the monster; G. Lairesse pinx.
- St. Peter penitent; after P. Moreels.
- A Landscape, with mythological figures; F. de Neve pinx.
- The Temptation of St. Anthony; Cam. Procaccini pinx.
- A Man holding a glass; Rostrate pinx.
- Bust of a Man; circular.
- Bust of a young Man crowned with laurels; circular.
- Bust of Hippolyta; oval.
- Two Heads, with Phrygian and Grecian Head-dresses; one plate.
- The Satyr, and a Peasant; oval.
- Vanitas, a Child blowing bubbles.
- Abundance, a figure sitting.
- The head of a Vestal, crowned with roses.
- Small bust of Jupiter; circular.
- Small bust of Venus; same.
- Half length of a Boy holding a Cat.
- Cupid and Psyche.
- A Blind Man playing on the Flute.
- Andromeda.
