= Simon Du Bois =

Dutch painter

Simon Du Bois or Dubois (baptized 26 July 1632, Antwerp – buried 26 May 1706, London)), was a portrait painter, of Flemish or Dutch origin, active in England from 1685 until his death.

== Life ==
Du Bois was the youngest son of Hendrick Du Bois, and his wife Helena Leonora Sieveri. Born at Antwerp, the family lived in Rotterdam by 1643, where Hendrick was described as a painter and dealer in works of art and where he died in 1647.

From 1646 to 1653 Dubois lived in Haarlem, where he was a pupil of Van Berchem and Wouwermans, and took to painting horses and cattle pictures. In 1653 he traveled with his 13-year older brother Eduard (1619-1696). Here Simon began his career as a painter of small battle-pieces in the Italian fashion. In 1657 he was active in Venice, in 1661 he was back in Rotterdam, but in 1667 he was paid for a portrait he painted in Rome of Alexander VII.

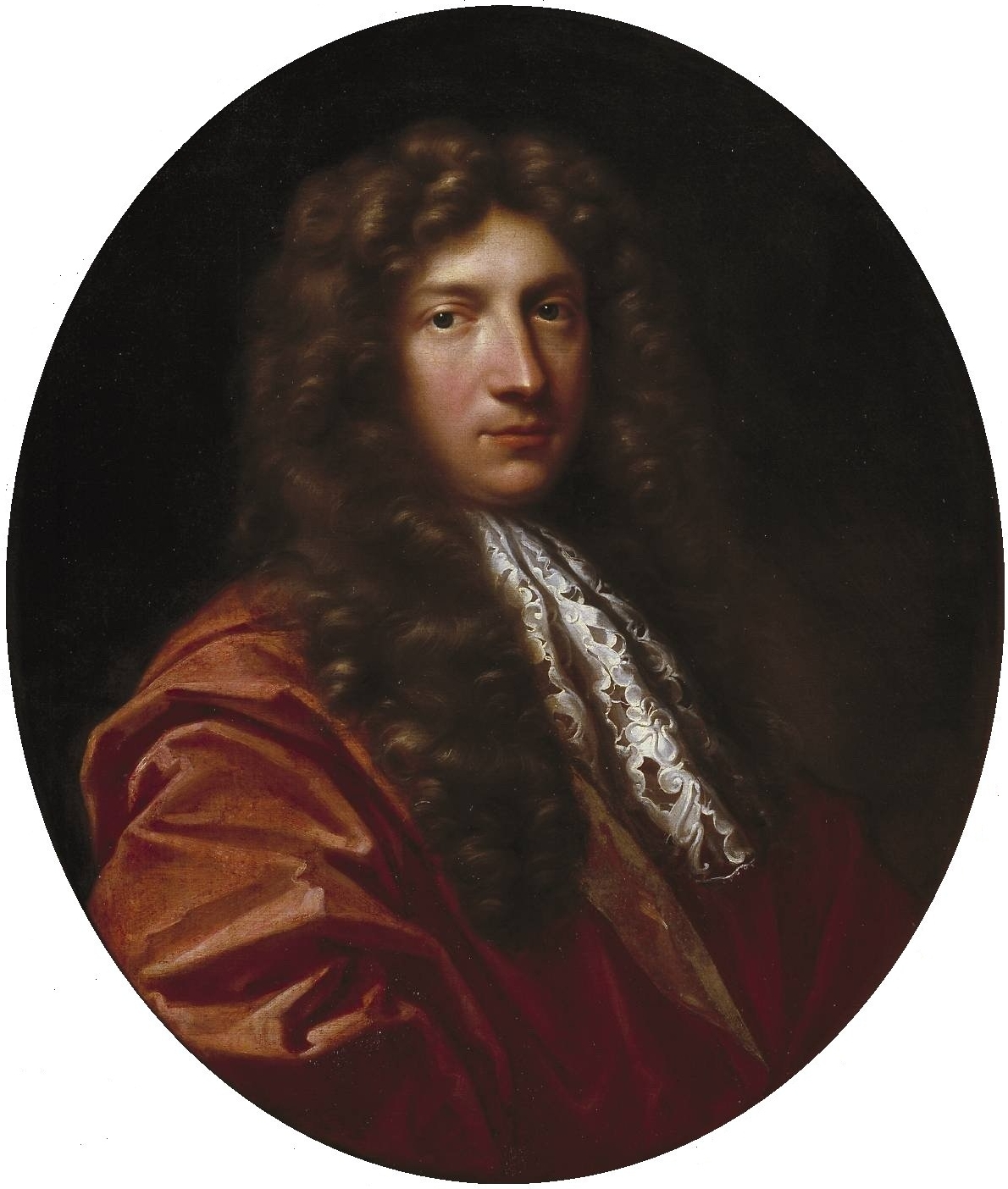
Portrait by Simon du Bois, thought to be of Arthur Parsons

He gained a great reputation for his works in this style, and so nearly approached the manner of the great masters then in vogue, that he was able to sell many of his pictures as their works, excusing himself on the ground that, if he put his own name to them, their merit would never be recognised. He had a curious neat way of finishing his figures, which he also employed in portrait-painting; according to Vertue he was induced to turn his hand to this by the advice of a lady friend.

He came to England in 1680, and was fortunate in securing the patronage and friendship of Lord-chancellor Somers, who sat to him for his portrait and paid him liberally. James Elsum wrote an epigram on this portrait of the lord chancellor. Du Bois lived in Covent Garden with his brother, and had plenty of practice, amassing considerable sums of money, which they hoarded together. Late in life, and after his brother's death, about 1707, he married Sarah, daughter of William Van de Velde the younger, but only survived a year, dying in May 1708.

In his will, among legacies to his wife and relations, he left to Lord Somers "my father's and mother's pictures drawn by Van Dyke, and my case of books and the books therein"; and further to his wife "the copper-plates of my father and mother, and the prints printed from the same". These portraits by Vandyck were noted by Gustav Waagen as being in the collection of the Earl of Hardwicke at Wimpole Hall, and were engraved by Cornelis Visscher.

== Works ==
Among the portraits painted by Du Bois in England were those of Archbishop Tenison, at Lambeth Palace; John Wilmot, 2nd Earl of Rochester, at Knole Park; Lord Berkeley of Stratton; William Bentinck, 1st Earl of Portland (engraved in mezzotint by Robert Williams, and in line by Jacobus Houbraken); Adrian Beverland (engraved in mezzotint by Isaac Beckett); four portraits of Sir Richard Head, bart., his wife and family (destroyed by A fire at the Pantechnicon in 1874) and others. His widow remarried a Mr. Burgess. Vertue mentions various portraits of Du Bois himself.

== Family ==
His elder brother, Edward Dubois (December 1619, Antwerp – October 1696, London), was also a painter. He was a "history and landskip painter", according to Vertue, born at Antwerp, and "disciple to one Groenwegen, a landskip painter likewise". He travelled with his brother from Haarlem to Italy, and remained there for 27 years. He also worked some time in Paris, and on his way to Italy executed some works for Charles Emmanuel, duke of Savoy.

In 1680, he came to London, presumably with his brother, and lived with Simon in Covent Garden, where he died at the age of 76. His name appears as publisher on Visscher's prints of the portraits of his parents mentioned above.
