= Adrian Beverland =

Dutch humanist scholar

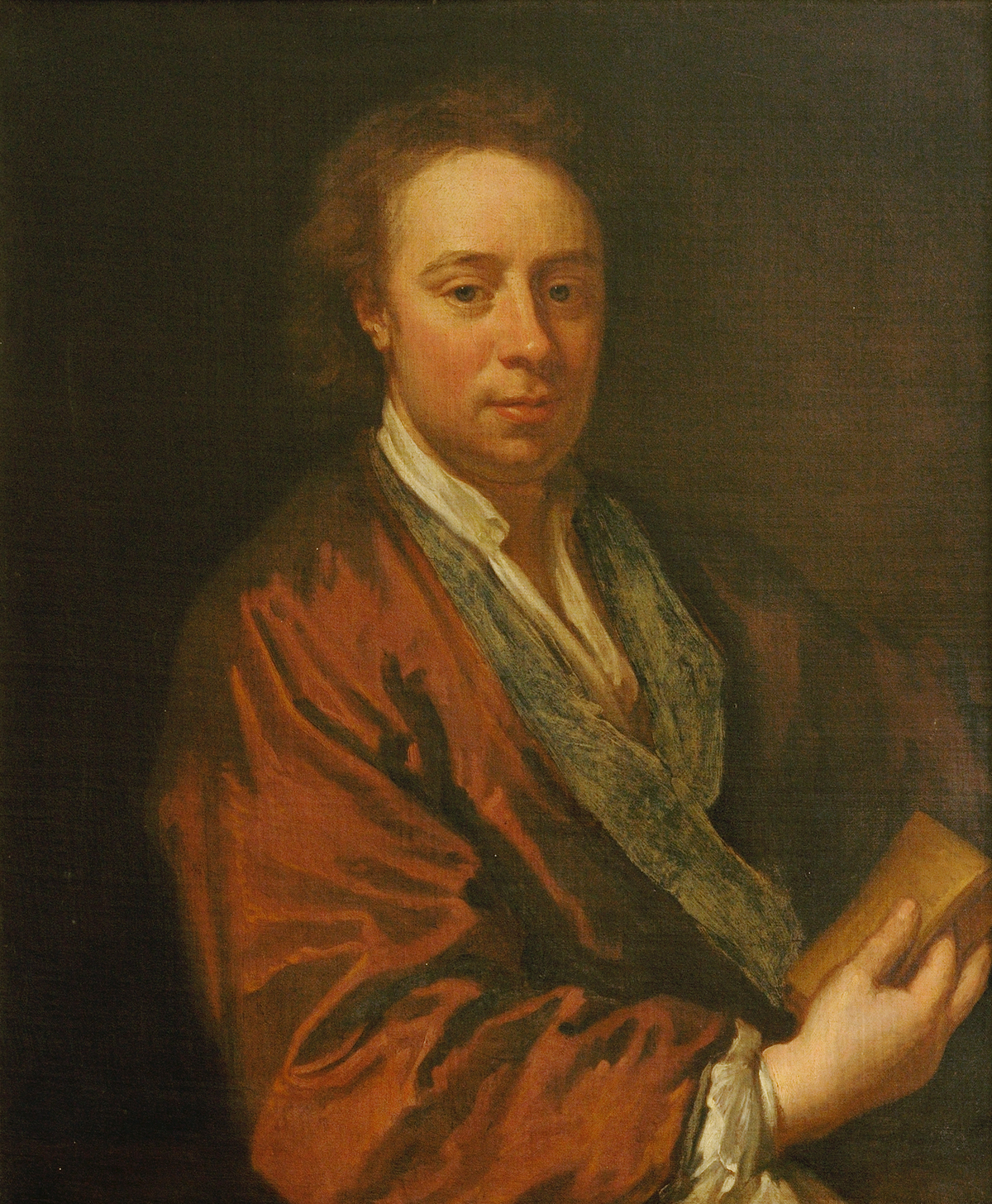
Hadriaan Beverland by Godfrey Kneller in c. 1689 (currently on display in the Bodleian Library, Oxford)

Hadriaan Beverland (Hadrianus Beverlandus, September–December 1650 Middelburg, Zeeland – 14 December 1716 London) was a Dutch humanist scholar who was banished from Holland in 1679 and settled in England in 1680.

== Early life ==
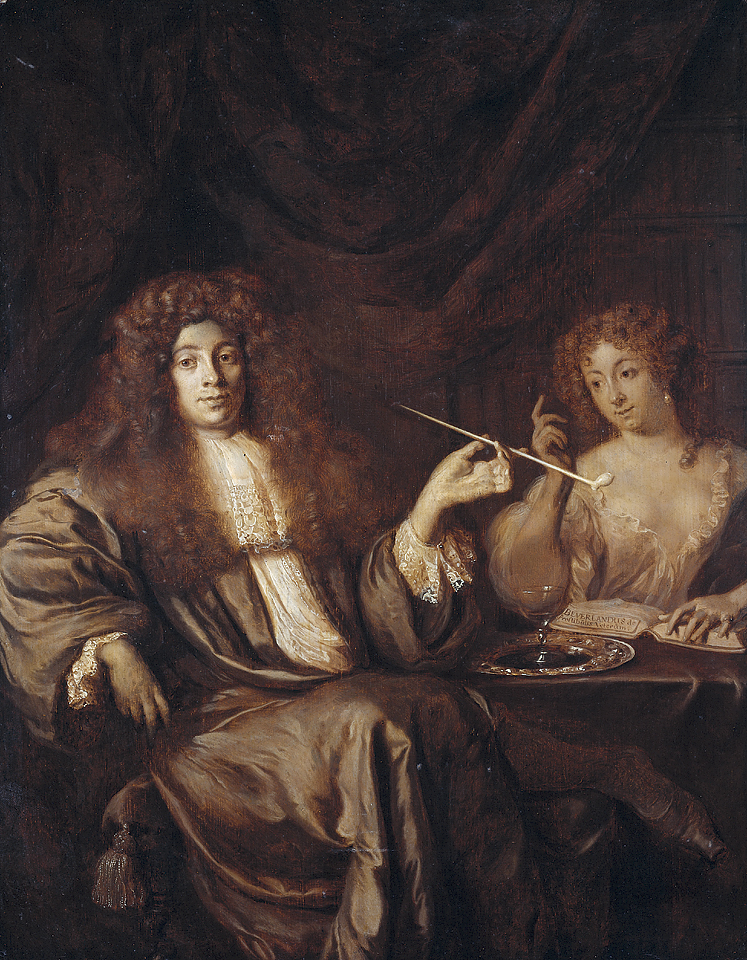
Hadrian Beverland, in a painting attributed to Ary de Vois, c. 1676

Beverland was born between 20 September and 14 December 1650 in Middelburg, son to Johannes Beverland (?–1654) and Catarina van Deijnse (?–1665). He had two older brothers: Johannes (1638?–1695) and Christoffel (1646?–1676). His father worked in the military village of Lillo and died in March 1654. In September 1654, Beverland's mother Catarina married Bernard de Gomme, an important military engineer for the English army. The couple moved to England around 1660. Beverland and his brothers remained in Middelburg to finish their education and lived in different households.

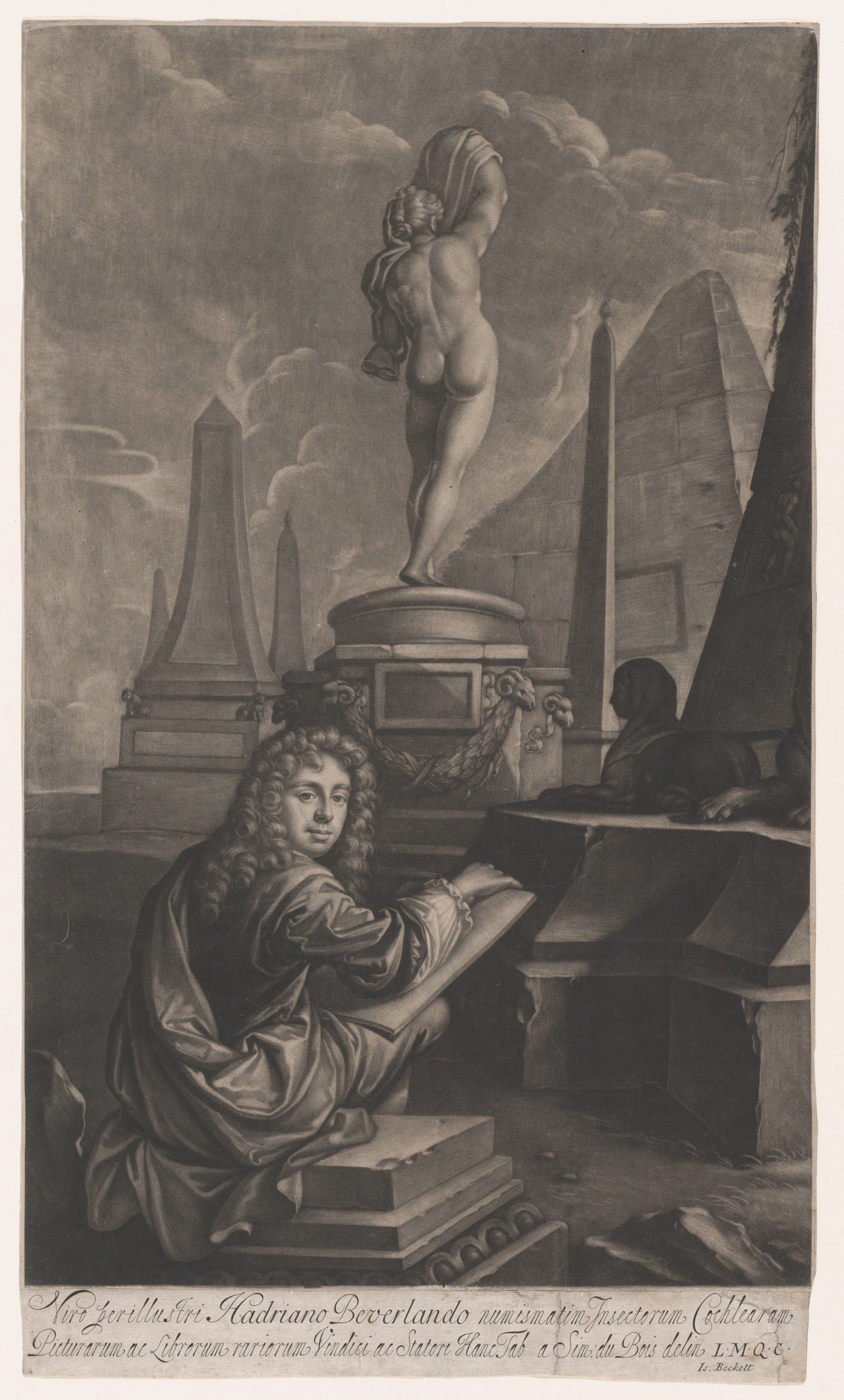
Hadriaan Beverland c. 1687 by Isaac Beckett (after Simon du Bois)

In 1663 Beverland was registered at the Latin School of Middelburg. In July 1669 he was registered at the University of Franeker. He also studied at the universities of Leiden and Utrecht in the decade that followed and spent a year at the University of Oxford in 1672, a move that was partly inspired by (the threat of) war in the Dutch Republic. During his studies, Beverland befriended other humanist scholars: Jacob de Goyer, Nicolaas Heinsius, Jacobus Gronovius, Johann Georg Graevius, and Isaac Vossius. He earned a doctorate in law at the University of Utrecht in 1677.

From his early twenties onwards, Beverland focused on compiling a grand work on sexual lust, which would be titled ‘De Prostibulis Veterum’ (‘On the prostitution of the ancients’). By 1677 Beverland contemplated the publication of his ideas and in 1678 he offered a first glimpse of his conclusions in Peccatum Originale (Original Sin). To silence the criticism he received after his first publication, from members of the Dutch Reformed Church in particular, Beverland decided to edit the work. He published a second edition, De Peccato Originali (On Original sin), in 1679.

== Studies ==
In his studies Beverland defined sexual lust as the original sin. He argued that Adam and Eve had had sexual relations in the Garden of Eden, disobeying God's commands. As a punishment, all people were henceforth dominated by sexual desire. Beverland concentrated on the past to display the universal power of lust in human nature. Yet he also made sure to point to the gross discrepancy between the official restriction of sex to marriage, prevalent in Calvinist doctrine and secular laws in early modern states, and the actual sexual behaviour of men and women in his contemporary society. He came up with a simple solution the problem of lust: sexual liberty for the educated men of the higher ranks of society, who could responsibly enjoy the unavoidable sin.

Berverland adopted some forms of pantheism and also argued that human reason is incapable of controlling the sexual force of lust both in the mind and in the body. This conception was closely similar to the Spinoza's view of conatus of all beings as the "natural desire to persevere in their existence", but it also opposed to the liberating power of the intellect, like it had been described in the last part of the Spinoza's Ethics.

In the De Stolatae Virginitatis Iure (On the Law of Draped Virginity, 1680), his work on female lust, Berverland outlined practical solutions on how to deal with the problem of lust in human nature in general and the abundance of sexual misbehaviour in his contemporary Dutch society in particular. He proposed for instance that prostitution should be legalized.

== Banishment and exile ==
During a provincial Synod in Gouda in July 1679 Beverland's works were discussed by members of the Dutch Reformed Church. Concluding that his study on sex and sin was licentious and injurious, deputies from the Synods of North- and South-Holland sent a request to the States of Holland. On 12 September 1679 the States approved the request of the deputies of the Synods, in which they had asked to prohibit and repress Beverland's publications to conserve God, his Word, and the Dutch Reformed religion, and to protect young people in Dutch society from Beverland's ideas. The States concluded that the University of Leiden, where Beverland was enrolled as a student at the time, should advise them on the appropriate course of action.

On 26 October 1679 Beverland was arrested. While in prison, he managed to have a third edition of his work on sex and sin printed, titled Poma Amoris (The Fruits of Love). Beverland's arrest was handled by the university court of the University of Leiden (Academische Vierschaar). The prosecutor Johan Dirckszoon van Vesanevelt submitted a request to the university court, in which he pleaded for Beverland's conviction. It was discussed by the Vierschaar on 11 November 1679. Beverland made his first appearance before the university court during a private hearing on 15 November. He responded to Van Vesanevelt's accusations by asking the judges to treat him in a fatherly manner and to refrain from punishing him too harshly, if there was any evidence of sacrilege, blasphemy, heterodoxy, or obscenity found in his works. On the same day, after the Vierschaar heard his confession, they convicted Beverland of writing godless, profane, and perverse works. In addition to a series of minor punishments, Beverland had to retract his heterodox and erroneous statements on the Bible, and had to ask God, and the people he offended with his work, for forgiveness. The De Peccato Originali was censured, he had to hand in the ‘De Prostibulis Veterum’ manuscript, and to promise not to publish any more scandalous works. He was expelled from the University of Leiden and was banished from Holland and Zeeland. If he returned to these provinces without special permission, he would meet with corporal punishment.

On 4 December 1679 Beverland signed a written statement, in which he promised to never again write or publish anything against the Bible or decent virtues, that he would hand over the ‘De Prostibulis Veterum’ manuscript, and that he accepted all the other punishments of the Vierschaar. He was released from prison the same day. Beverland travelled to Utrecht. Situated outside the provinces of Holland and Zeeland, he was allowed to stay in this city without violating the terms of his punishment. In March 1680, as part of his sentence, Beverland handed over the manuscript of the first book of the ‘De Prostibulis Veterum’ to the authorities of the University of Leiden and in the same month he travelled across the Channel. He was welcomed into the home of his friend Isaac Vossius in Windsor. He continued to work on his ‘De Prostibulis Veterum’ (he had sent copies of the first, second, and third book of the work to England before his departure). Sometime in the next two decades, however, he gave up on his master thesis. He seems to have realised that the work would never be published and he started focusing on other things.

Beverland did continue his classical studies concentrating for instance on Martial's epigrams, the satires of Juvenal, and De Rerum Natura of Lucretius. In addition to classical scholarship, soon after his arrival in England Beverland started working as a sort of secretary, librarian, and broker in the service of Dutch friends, such as Vossius, and new English contacts, like Hans Sloane.

Beverland soon started contemplating his return to the Dutch Republic. He composed a plea to the judges of the University of Leiden in 1684, which stated that he had renounced his youthful bravado. By the late 1680s, since his appeal had gone unheard, he started working on an apologetic work titled De Fornicatione Cavenda Admonitio (Warning about fornication which should be avoided, 1697, 1698). In the treatise Beverland repudiated the lewd contents and lascivious style of his earlier works. In the end it was the sale of the library of Isaac Vossius to the University of Leiden, in which Beverland played an important role, that secured Beverland a pardon for his sentence. The University of Leiden retracted his conviction and in 1693 he received a pardon from King William III, the highest judge of the United Provinces in his position as Stadholder.

Beverland never returned to the Dutch Republic however. From the 1690s onwards, mental and financial troubles started to determine his life. He lived together with his partner, Rebecca Tibbith, and their daughter Anna in different places in and just outside London. Beverland died in London on 14 December 1716 and was buried four days later, in the yard of St. Paul's Church in Covent Garden.

== Published works ==
- Pleydoy gedaen bij N.N. Advocaet in saake van N.N. gedaegden in cas van falsiteyt, ter eenre. Op ende jegens N.N. Bailjau, inne officy Eysscher, ter andere zijde (Utrecht, 1677).
- Rime di diversi autori composte sive Satyrae Satodicae diversorum Authorum compositae (Leiden, 1678).
- Peccatum Originale kat' exochên sic nuncupatum, philologice problêmatikôs elucubratum a Themidis Alumno. Vera redit facies, dissimulate periit, Psalmographus Os. LVIII commate IV. Abalienati sunt implii inde a vulva, erraverunt ab utero; loquentes mendacia. Proba merx facile emptorem reperit, tametsi in abstruse sita sit loco. Eleutheropoli extra plateam obscuram, sine privilegio auctoris, absque ubi et quando (Leiden, 1678).
- De Peccato Originali kat' exochên sic nuncupato Dissertatio Psalmographus Ps. LVIII commate IV. Abalienati sunt implii inde a vulva, erraverunt ab utero; loquentes mendacia. Ex typographeio M.DC.LXXIX (Leiden, 1679).
- Poma Amoris per Hadr. Beverlandum J.U. Licentiatum adornata. Editio tertia prioribus auctior et emendatior (Leiden, 1679).
- De Stolatae Virginitatis iure Lucubratio Academica. Nuda recede Venus: non est tuus iste libellus tu mihi, tu Pallas Caesariana veni (Leiden, 1679).
- De Fornicatione Cavenda Admonitio Sive adhortatio ad Pudicitiam et Castitatem (London, 1697, 1698).
- Although my innocency is shelter’d with a bulwark of vertues. Nevertheless I find the same undermin’d in its own garrison (London, 1709 and 1712?).
- Patrimonii sui reliquiae (London, 1711/12).

== Portraits ==
In a portrait attributed to Ary de Vois, now in the Rijksmuseum, Beverland is shown seated at a table, with a prostitute. There is another painting of him in the Ashmolean Museum by Godfrey Kneller. An engraving of 1686 by Isaac Beckett, after a design by Simon du Bois shows Beverland, (in a parody of a respectable 1670 frontispiece by Abraham Blotelingh of Lorenzo Pignoria), amongst Egyptian antiquities, sketching a female nude.

== Sources ==
- Karen E. Hollewand, 2017, 'The Banished Scholar: Beverland, Sex, and Liberty in the Seventeenth-Century Low Countries', in: Early Modern Low Countries, 1(2), pp. 273–296.
- Karen E. Hollewand, The Banishment of Beverland. Sex, Sin, and Scholarship in the Seventeenth-Century Dutch Republic, Brill's Studies in Intellectual History, volume: 298. Brill Leiden 2019.
- Karen E. Hollewand, (2018, April 12). Beverland, Hadriaan (1650–1716), humanist scholar. Oxford Dictionary of National Biography.
- Rudolf de Smet, Hadrianus Beverlandus (1650-1716). Non unus e multis peccator. Studie over het leven en werk van Hadriaan Beverland. Brussel: Paleis der Academiën 1988 (187 pp.).
- Joyce Zelen, 'The Self-Promotion of a Libertine Bad Boy: Hadriaan Beverland's Portrait with a Prostitute in the Rijksmuseum', in: The Rijksmuseum Bulletin, volume 66, no. 4 (2018), pp. 362–385.
