= Francis Lepipre =

Flemish-English artist

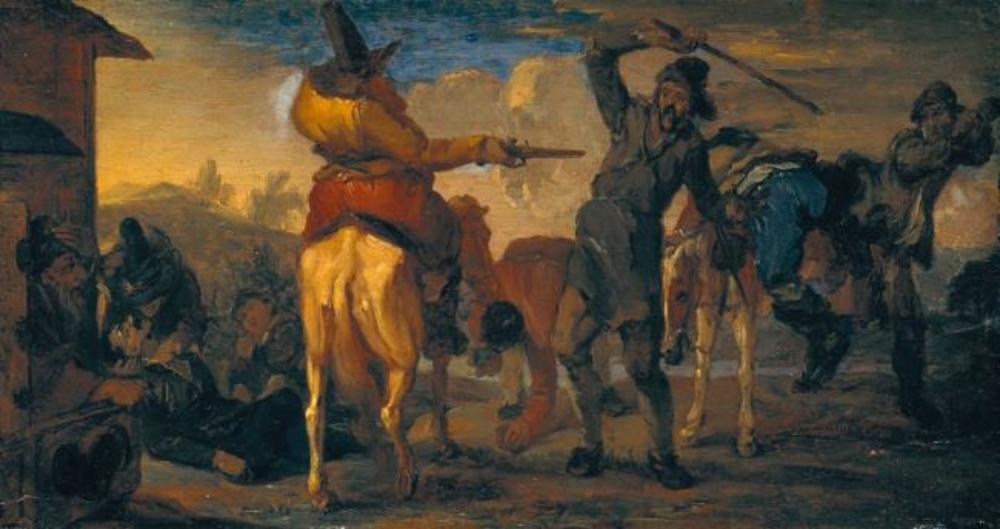
The Combat of Hudibras and Cerdon (c. 1664–77)

Francis Lepipre or Le Piper (c. 1640 – 1695) was an English artist of Flemish ancestry.

== Life ==
Francis Lepipre, son of Noel Lepipre, belonged to a family of some importance in Flanders, which had, however, settled in England, and owned property at Canterbury. His father made a large fortune as a merchant, and gave Lepipre a liberal education, but he showed a genius for art, and devoted himself to drawing. Having no need to earn his livelihood, he drew for his amusement, selecting subjects of a humorous or comical nature. His memory was so good that he could draw exact likenesses of any one whom he had only passed in the street. He was of a genial nature, fond of the bottle and good living, and a great favourite among his friends. Some of his best drawings were made for taverns, such as the Mitre in Stocks Market and the Bell in Westminster.

Lepipre travelled much on the continent, and his close study of the works of the great painters rendered him an excellent draughtsman. He once extended his travels as far as Cairo in Egypt. He drew landscapes and humorous compositions and caricatures, and frequently etched subjects on silver plates for his friends, who used them as lids to their tobacco-boxes. Lepipre painted twelve small pictures of scenes in Hudibras, which are very similar to the set engraved by William Hogarth. Some of the heads in Sir Paul Rycaut's History of the Turks were drawn by Lepipre and engraved by W. Elder. There are a few humorous drawings by him in the print room at the British Museum.

Lepipre inherited some fortune at the death of his father, but at one time found himself considerably reduced in circumstances, and temporarily worked for Isaac Beckett the mezzotint-engraver. Late in life he took to modelling in wax, executing bas-reliefs in this manner with some success. After his mother's death he inherited further property, and indulged in free living again. A fever was the result, and through medical inexperience it proved fatal. He died unmarried in Aldermanbury in 1698, and was buried in St. Mary Magdalen, Bermondsey. Two portraits of Lepipre were engraved in mezzotint, one being ascribed to E. Luttrell; others were engraved for various editions of Walpole's Anecdotes of Painting. He also was the central figure of a group painted by Isaac Fuller. His brother, Peter Lepipre, was a merchant in London, and owned most of his brother's drawings. He married Sarah, daughter of Sir Gabriel Roberts, by whom he had a large family.
