= Albert Benningk =

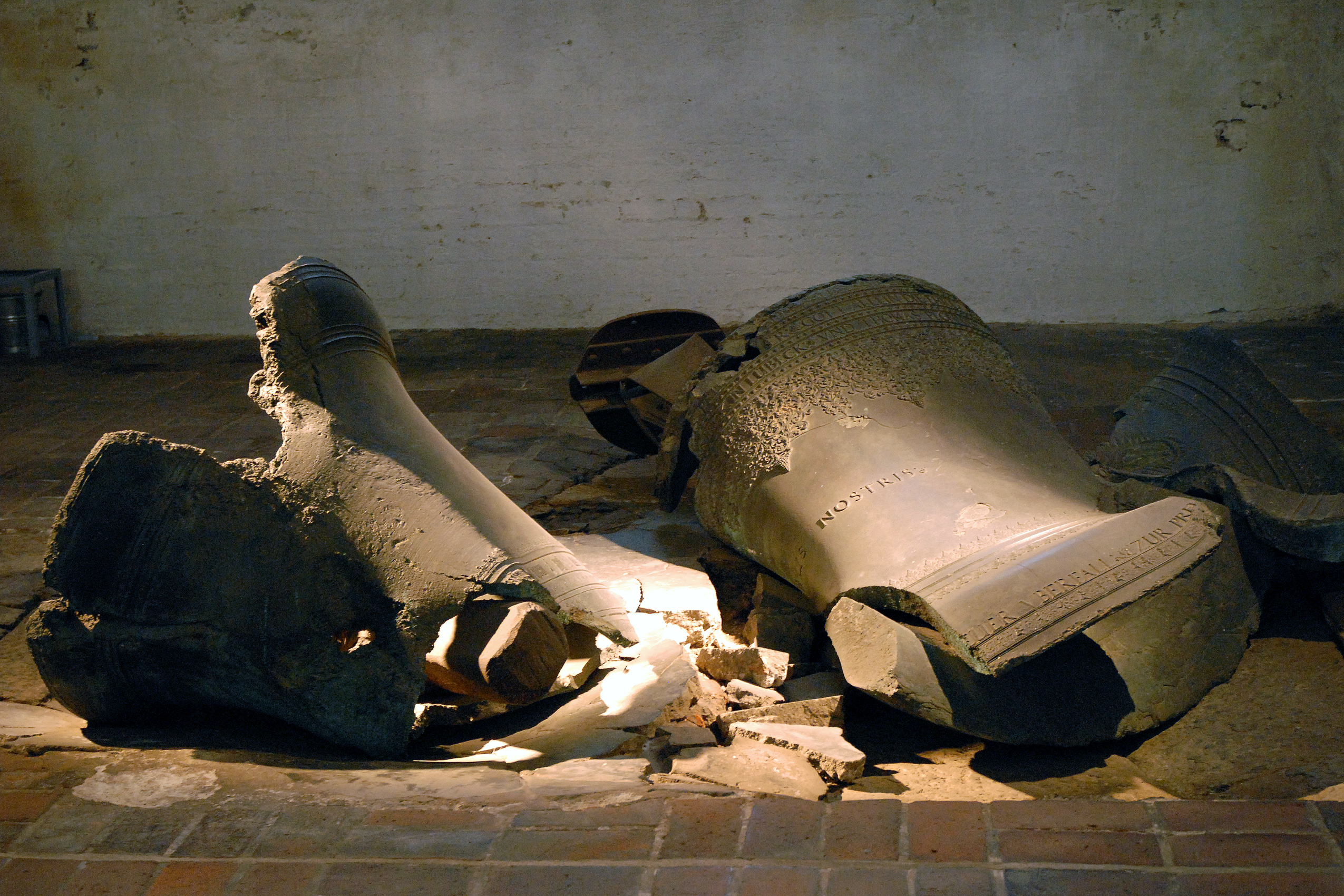
Destroyed bells of St. Mary's in Lübeck; at the right side the Pulsglocke

Albert Benningk (1637-1695) was a German bellfounder and producer of baroque cannons. He was mainly active at the municipal foundry of the Hanseatic city of Lübeck and in his later life in Copenhagen.

Most famous is his Pulsglocke for St. Mary's Church, Lübeck cast in 1669. It was destroyed during the British air raid on Lübeck in 1942 and since then has served as a war memorial.

His baroque cannons are on exhibit in major army and history museums in Europe, (for example, the Zeughaus in Berlin (Deutsches Historisches Museum), the Tøjhus Museum in Copenhagen, the Legermuseum in Delft, the Artillery Museum in Saint Petersburg and the Museum of Military History, Vienna).

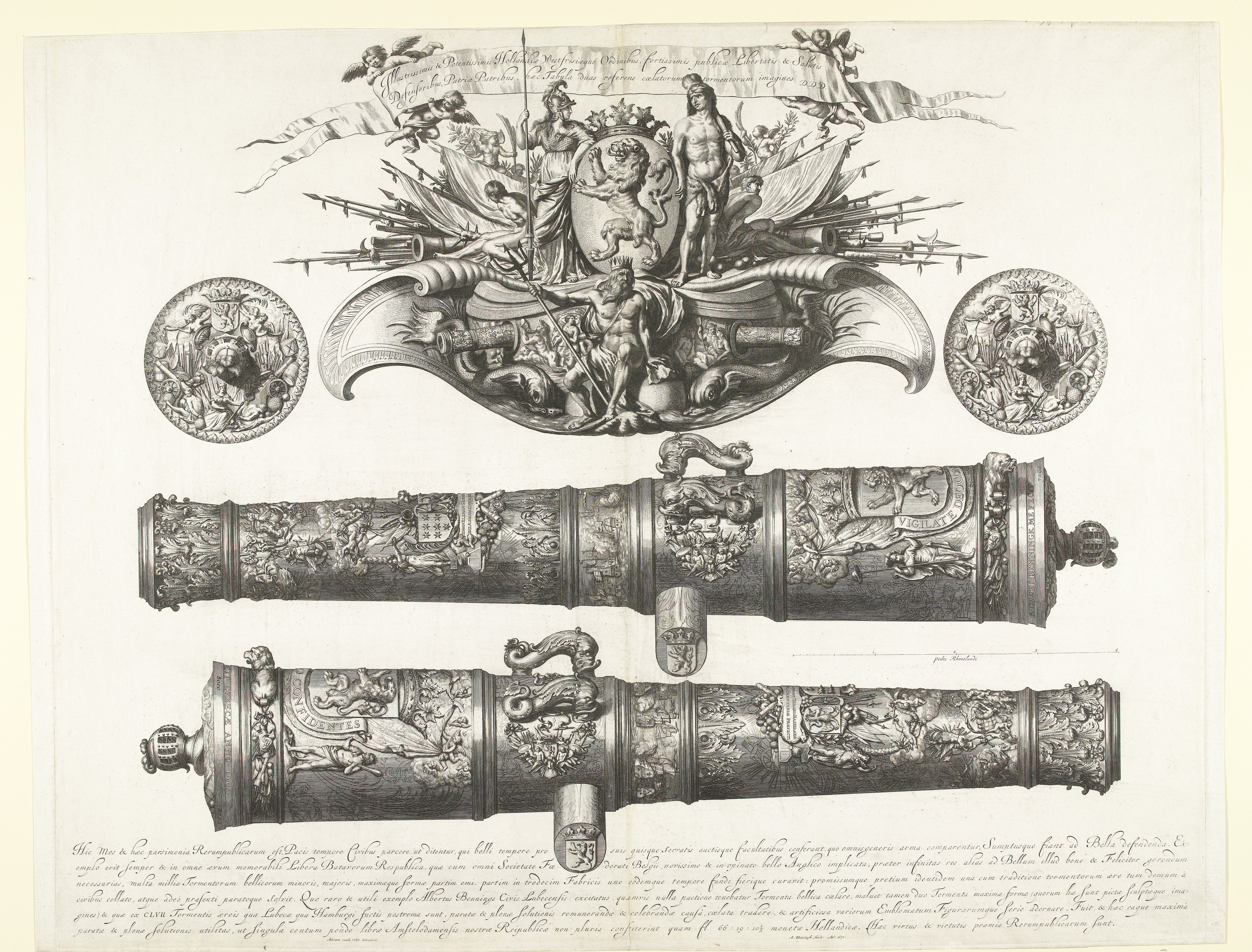
Benningk cannons for the Netherlands (Etching by Abraham Blooteling after a drawing by Adriaen van de Velde)

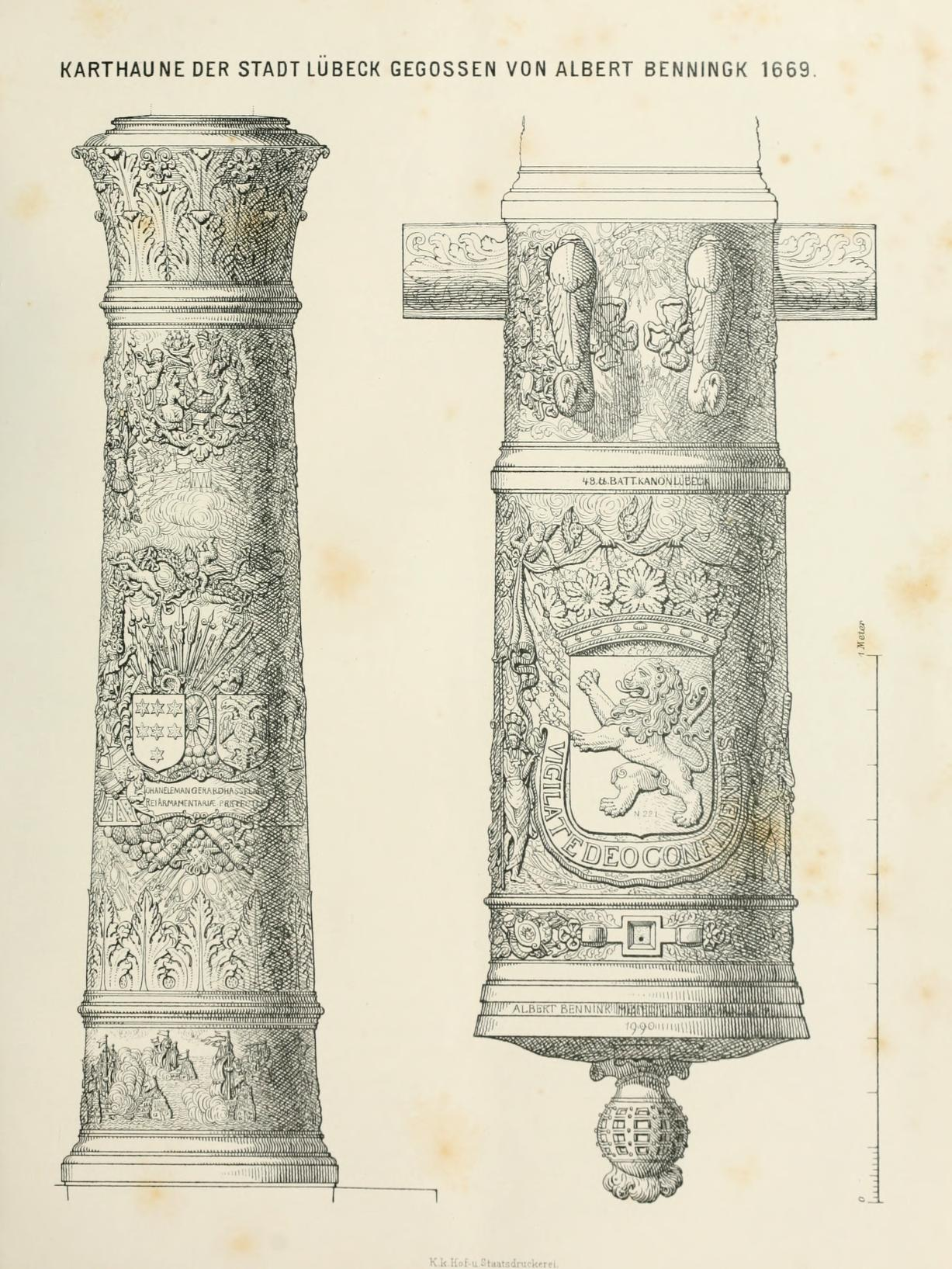
Benningk cannon in Vienna

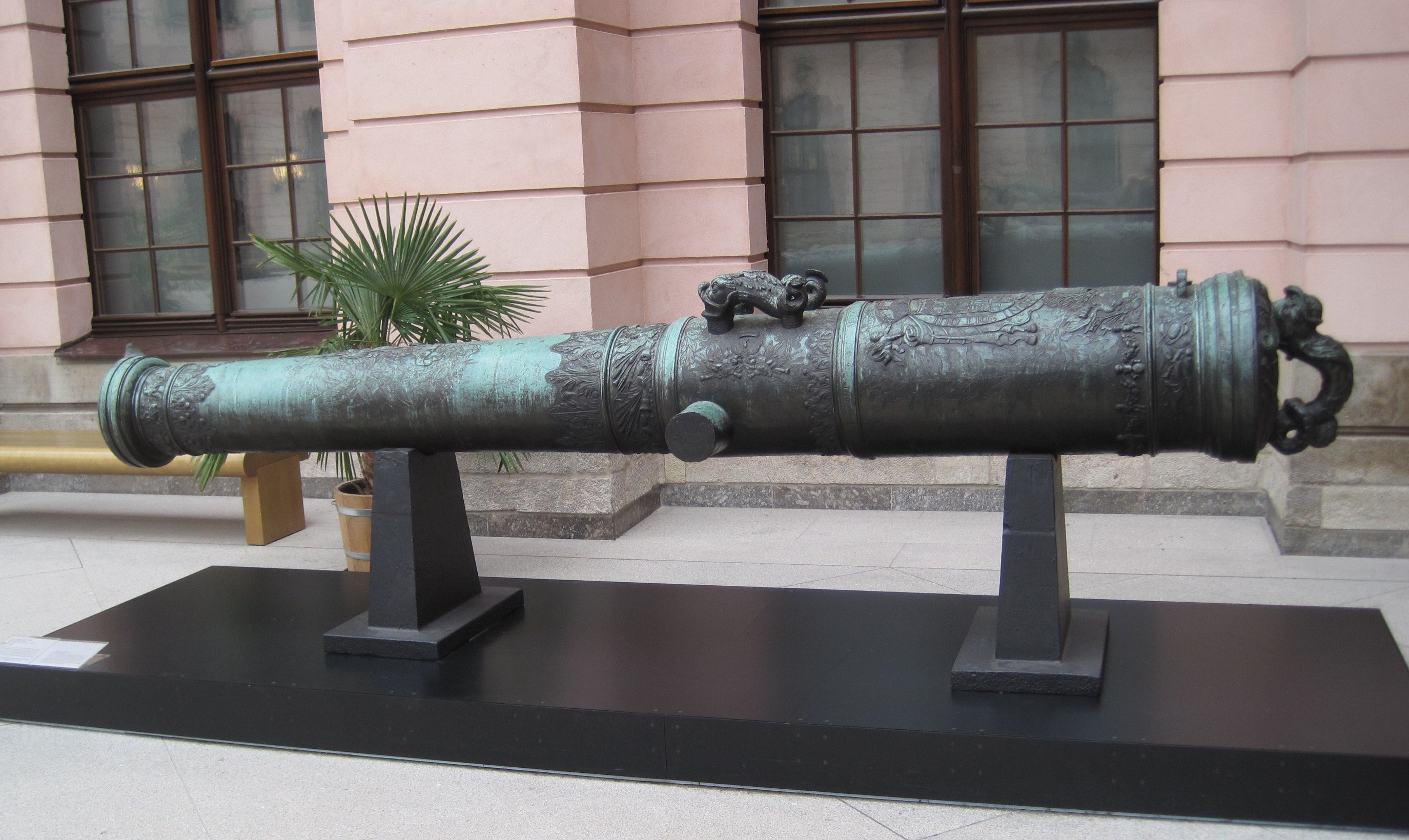
Pallas-Athene (1679), Berlin

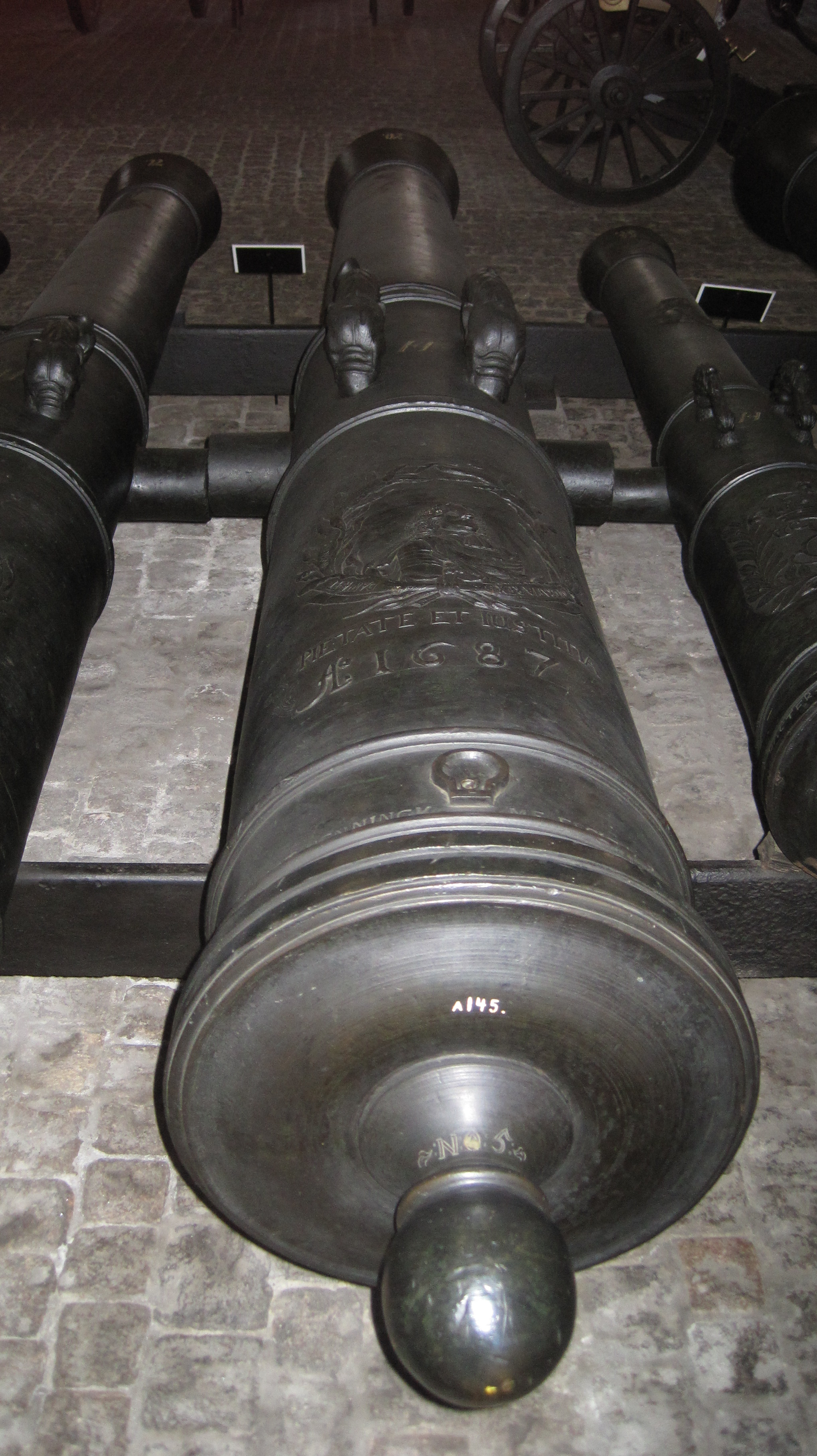
Cannon cast in 1687 in Copenhagen
