= Thomas Chafe (Bridport MP) =

English politician

Thomas Chafe MP JP DL (c. 1642–1701), West Hall, Folke, Dorset, was MP for Bridport from 1685 to 1688.

== Background ==
Thomas Chafe was the eldest son of Thomas Chafe MP. He was educated at Sherborne, and Wadham College, Oxford.

== Political career ==
He was a JP for Dorset from 1670 to 1700, commissioner for assessment 1673–80, Freeman of Lyme Regis in 1683, and DL of Dorset from 1685 to his death in 1701.

== Family life ==
On 13 April 1662, Chafe married Susanna, the daughter and heiress of Edward Moleyns of West Hall. He had one son and five daughters. He died in 1701.
