= Thomas Clifford, 1st Baron Clifford of Chudleigh =

English statesman

The Right Honourable The Lord Clifford of Chudleigh
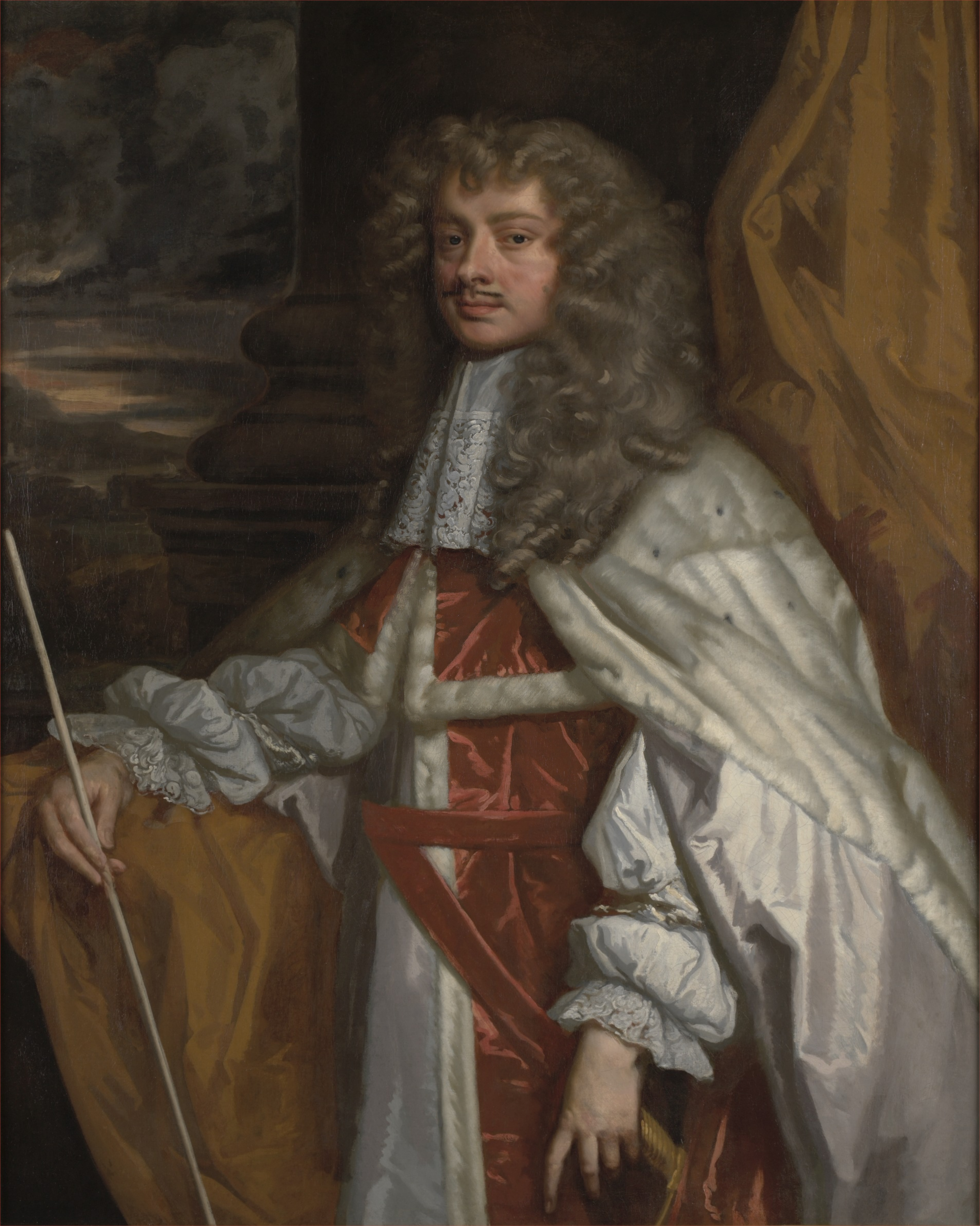
- Portrait by Sir Peter Lely, c. 1672

Member of the English Parliament for Totnes
- In office 1660–1673 Serving with: Thomas Chafe (1660–1661); Sir Edward Seymour (1661–1673)
- Succeeded by: Sir Thomas Berry; Sir Edward Seymour

Chief Minister of Great Britain; Lord High Treasurer
- In office 28 November 1672 – 24 June 1673
- Preceded by: In Commission
- Succeeded by: The Viscount Latimer

Treasurer of the Household
- In office 1668–1672
- Preceded by: Charles Fitzhardinge, 2nd Viscount Fitzhardinge
- Succeeded by: The Lord Newport

Comptroller of the Household
- In office 1666–1668
- Preceded by: Sir Hugh Pollard, Bt
- Succeeded by: The Lord Newport

Personal details
- Born: Thomas Clifford; 1 August 1630
- Died: 17 October 1673 (aged 43)
- Cause of death: Suicide
- Spouse: Elizabeth Martin
- Children: 15, including Hugh Clifford
- Parents: Sir Hugh Clifford; Mary Chudleigh

Thomas Clifford, 1st Baron Clifford of Chudleigh (1 August 1630 – 17 October 1673) was an English statesman who sat in the House of Commons from 1660 to 1672 when he was created Baron Clifford. He was one of five leading politicians who formed the Cabal ministry between 1668 and 1674 in the reign of Charles II.

== Background ==
Clifford was born in Ugbrooke, the son of Hugh Clifford of Chudleigh, Devon, and his wife Mary Chudleigh, daughter of Sir George Chudleigh, 1st Baronet. He was baptised on 4 August 1630 at Ugbrooke. He matriculated at Exeter College, Oxford in 1647 and entered Middle Temple in 1648.

His aunt, Sabina Clifford, married Matthew Hals (or (Halse) of Kenendon. Their daughter, Anne, married Rev John Tindal and was the mother of Dr Matthew Tindal, the eminent deist and author of Christianity as Old as the Creation.

== Political and public life ==
In April 1660, Clifford was elected Member of Parliament for Totnes in the Convention Parliament. He was re-elected MP for Totnes in 1661 for the Cavalier Parliament. He distinguished himself in naval battles, and was knighted. During the Second Anglo-Dutch War, Clifford served as one of four Commissioners for taking Care of Sick and Wounded Seamen and for the Care and Treatment of Prisoners of War (the others were Sir William D'Oyly, John Evelyn and Bullen Reymes).

In August 1665, Clifford was named Ambassador Extraordinary to Sweden; he traveled to Denmark in October, before returning to Britain the following February. He became Comptroller of the Household in 1666 and a member of the Privy Council. At the end of the Dutch war in 1669 he intrigued against the peace treaty, preferring the French interests.

He was one of the five Counsellors who formed the Cabal, each of whom pursued their own interests. Clifford was known as 'the Bribe Master General'. King Charles II entrusted for safekeeping to Clifford, his favorite aide, the British state papers of the 1670 Treaty of Dover, which "led to war between England and the Netherlands and might have ended British parliamentary rule and the Church of England".

Clifford was created the first Baron Clifford of Chudleigh on 22 April 1672 for his suggestion that the King supply himself with money by stopping, for one year, all payments out of the Exchequer. He was Lord High Treasurer from 28 November 1672 to June 1673, when, as a Roman Catholic, he found himself unable to comply with the Test Act and resigned.

He died possibly by his own hand (perhaps "strangled with his cravatt upon the bed-tester") a few months after his retirement.

== Marriage and children ==
Arms of Clifford: Checky or and azure, a fesse gules

He married Elizabeth Martin, who died in 1709. She was the daughter of Richard (William) Martin of Lindridge House, Devon.

- They had fifteen children, eight of which were daughters:
1. Elizabeth, born before 1655, died as infant.
2. Elizabeth, born 1655, died 1677, married in 1673 Henry Carew, 2nd Baronet Carew of Haccombe. They had no issue (?).
3. Mary, born 1658, died 9 October 1715, married in 1673 Sir Simon Leach of Cadeleigh. They had no issue (?).
4. Amy, born 1661, died 1693, married in October 1681 John Courtenay (d.1724) of Molland, Devon. They had numerous issue, as the mural monument in Molland Church attests. No male grandsons resulted and Molland descended via their daughter Mary who married William Paston of Horton Court, Chipping Sodbury, Gloucestershire.
5. Anne, born 1662, died 1678.
6. Rhoda, born 1665, died 1689.
7. Isabel Clifford, born between 1665 and 1669, died as infant.
8. Catherine Clifford, born 1670, died 1708.

And their sons were:

1. Thomas, born before 1652, died as infant.
2. Thomas, born before 1652, died as infant.
3. Thomas, born on 3 December 1652, died in 1671 in Florence, Italy.
4. George, born between 1653 and 1662, died as infant
5. Hugh, 2nd Baron Clifford of Chudleigh (1663–1730)
6. Simon, born 1666, died ?, acceded in 1686.
7. Charles, born 1671, baptized on 24 June 1671, died on 4 July 1691, buried in Ugbrooke.

Parliament of England
Preceded by John Pleydell; Gilbert Evelyn	MP for Totnes; 1660–1673 with Thomas Chafe 1660–1661; Sir Edward Seymour 1661–1673	Succeeded by Sir Thomas Berry; Sir Edward Seymour
Political offices
Preceded by Sir Hugh Pollard, Bt	Comptroller of the Household; 1666–1668	Succeeded by The Lord Newport
Preceded by The Viscount Fitzhardinge	Treasurer of the Household; 1668–1672	Succeeded by The Lord Newport
Preceded by In Commission (First Lord: The Duke of Albemarle)	Chief Minister of Great Britain; Lord High Treasurer; 1672–1673	Succeeded by The Viscount Latimer
Peerage of England
New creation	Baron Clifford of Chudleigh; 1672–1673	Succeeded by Hugh Clifford
