= Henry Bennet, 1st Earl of Arlington =

English politician and army officer (1618–1685)

The Right Honourable The Earl of Arlington KG PC
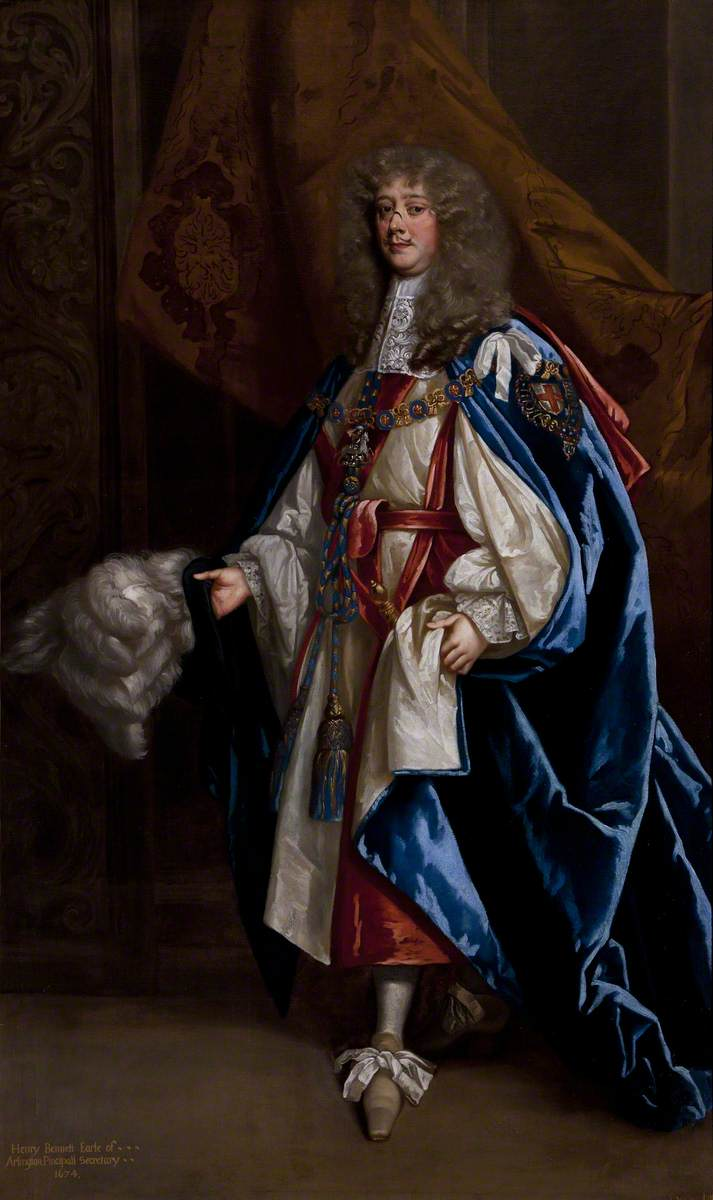
- Portrait by Sir Peter Lely, c. 1674

Secretary of State for the Southern Department
- In office 15 October 1662 – 11 September 1674
- Monarch: Charles II
- Preceded by: Edward Nicholas
- Succeeded by: Henry Coventry

Personal details
- Born: 30 January 1618
- Died: 28 July 1685 (aged 67)
- Spouse: Isabella de Nassau
- Children: Isabella FitzRoy, Duchess of Grafton
- Parent(s): Sir John Bennet of Dawley, Dorothy Crofts
- Education: Westminster School
- Alma mater: Christ Church, Oxford

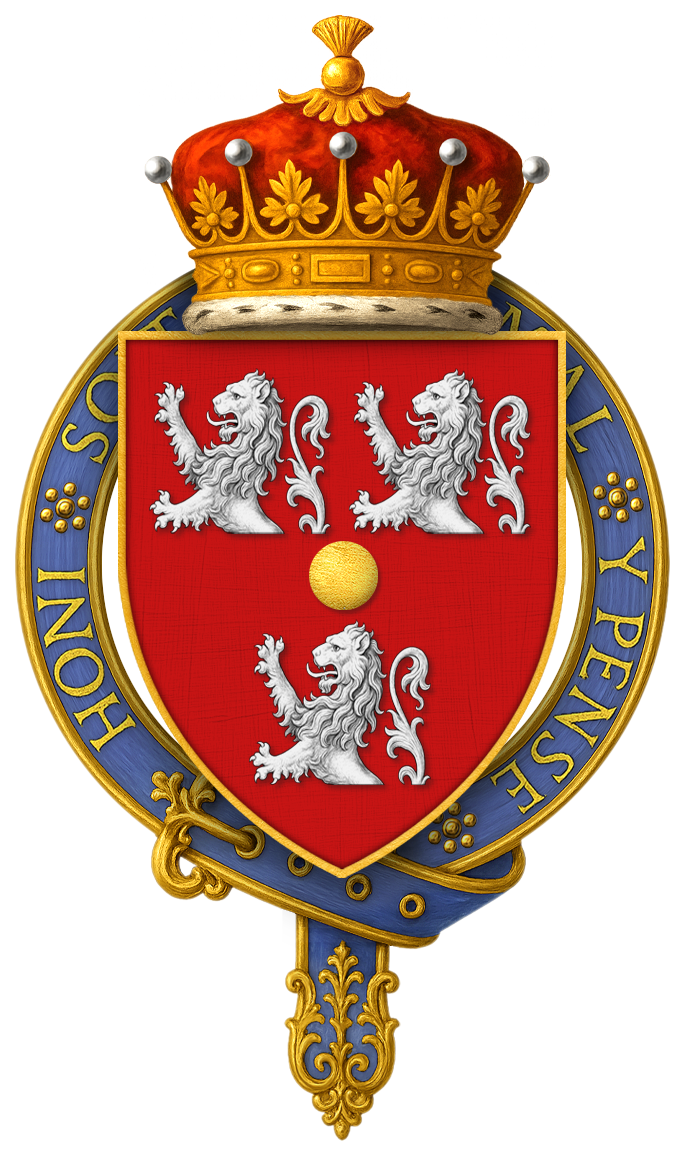
Garter-encircled arms of Henry Bennet, 1st Earl of Arlington, KG, PC

Henry Bennet, 1st Earl of Arlington (1618 – 28 July 1685) was an English politician and army officer. A supporter of the Royalists during the English Civil War, he joined the royal family in exile before returning to England at the Restoration in 1660. He gained political influence over the following decade and became one of Charles II's key advisors as a member of the Cabal ministry from 1668. He was impeached in 1674. He was a leading figure in the Court faction in the Parliament of England, a grouping which would evolve into the Tories.

== Background and early life ==
He was the son of Sir John Bennet of Dawley, Middlesex, by Dorothy, daughter of Sir John Crofts of Little Saxham, Suffolk. He was the younger brother of John Bennet, 1st Baron Ossulston; his sister was Elizabeth Bennet who married Sir Robert Carr (or Kerr), and his grandfather was Sir John Bennet. He was baptised at Little Saxham, Suffolk, in 1618, and was educated at Westminster School and Christ Church, Oxford. He gained some distinction as a scholar and a poet, and was originally destined for holy orders. In 1643, he was secretary to Lord Digby at Oxford, and was employed as a messenger between the queen and Ormonde in Ireland.

Subsequently, he took up arms for the king, and received a wound on the bridge of his nose in the skirmish at Andover in 1644. The scar resulting from this wound must have been prominent because Arlington took to covering it with black plaster. After the defeat of the royal cause he travelled in France and Italy, joined the exiled royal family in 1650, and in 1654 became official secretary to James, Duke of York on the recommendation of Charles, who had already been attracted by his "pleasant and agreeable humour". He was said by some to have been the father of an illegitimate child by Lucy Walter.

== Knighthood ==
In March 1657, he was knighted, and the same year was sent as Charles's agent to Madrid, where he remained, endeavouring to obtain assistance for the royal cause, until after the Restoration. On his return to England in 1661 he was made keeper of the privy purse, and became the prime favourite. One of his duties was the procuring and management of the royal mistresses, in which his success gained him great credit. Allying himself with Lady Castlemaine, he encouraged Charles's increasing dislike of Clarendon; and he was made secretary of state in October 1662 in spite of the opposition of Clarendon, who had to find him a seat in parliament. He represented Callington from 1661 until 1665, but appears never to have taken part in debate.

== Biography ==
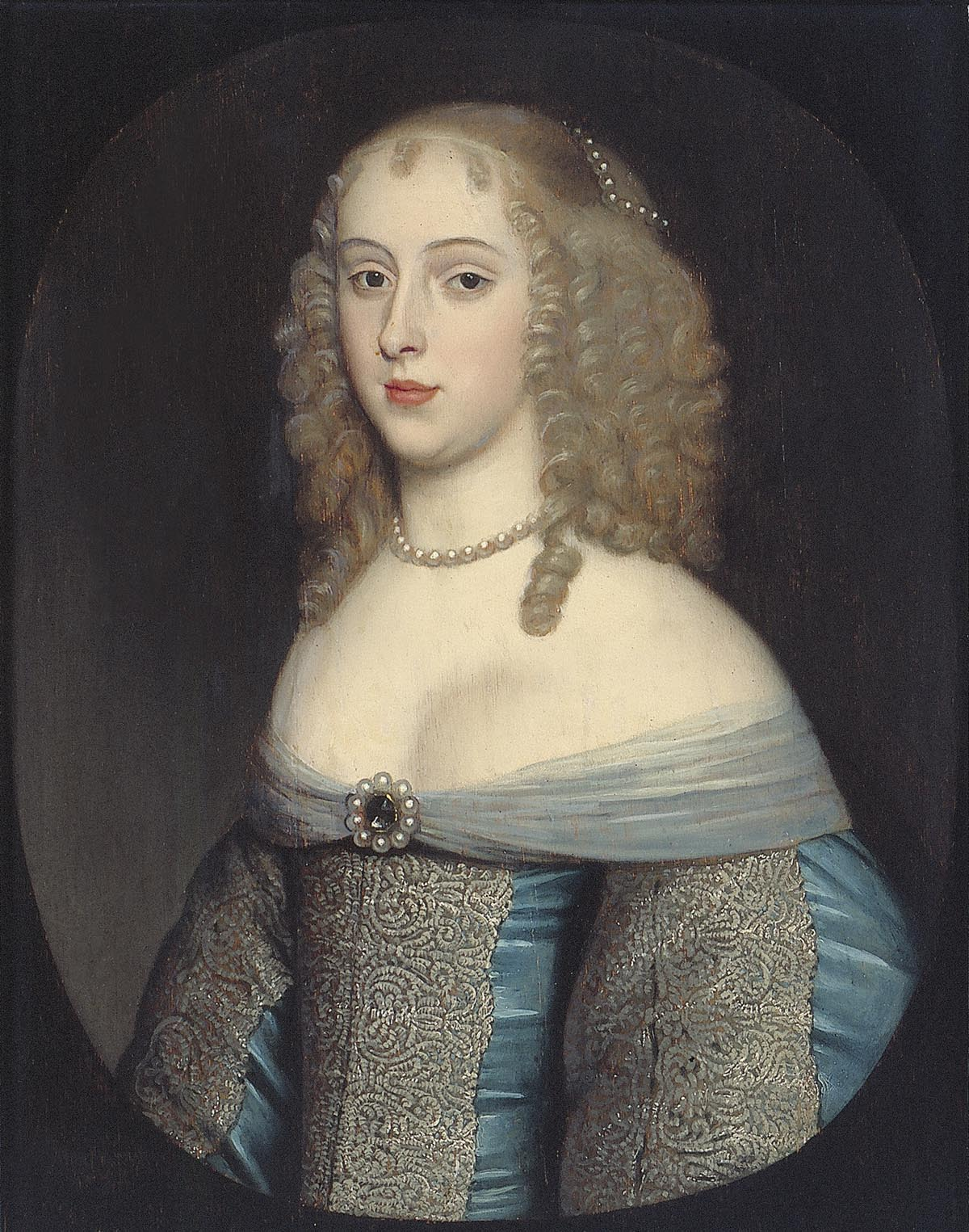
Arlington's wife, Isabella van Nassau-Beverweerd

Naturalization of Lady Isabella Arlington Act 1666
- Act of Parliament
- Parliament of England
- Long title: An Act for naturalizing of Isabella of Nassaw, Wife of the Right Honourable the Lord Arlington, One of His Majesty's Principal Secretaries of State.
- Citation: 18 & 19 Cha. 2. c. 2 Pr.
- Territorial extent: England and Wales

Dates
- Royal assent: 18 January 1667
- Commencement: 21 September 1666 (Note: Start of session.)

Status: Current legislation

He served subsequently on the committees for explaining the Irish Act of Settlement 1662 and for Tangier. In 1665 he obtained a peerage as Baron Arlington, (properly Harlington, in Middlesex) and in 1667 was appointed one of the postmasters-general. The control of foreign affairs was entrusted to him, and he was chiefly responsible for the attack on the Smyrna fleet and for the Second Anglo-Dutch War, during which he married the beautiful (and Dutch) Isabella van Nassau-Beverweert (28 December 1633 – 18 January 1718) in March 1665. Isabella was the daughter of Louis of Nassau, Lord of De Lek and Beverweerd, the natural son of stadtholder Maurice of Orange. Isabella was made a Lady of the Bedchamber to Catherine of Braganza and later became the queen’s Lady of the Robes. They had one daughter, Isabella FitzRoy, Duchess of Grafton (c.1668-1723). Lady Arlington's sister Emilia, another noted beauty, married Thomas Butler, 6th Earl of Ossory.

In 1665 he advised Charles to grant liberty of conscience, but this was merely a concession to gain money during the war; and he showed great activity later in oppressing the nonconformists.

== Death of Thomas Wriothesley ==
On the death of Thomas Wriothesley, 4th Earl of Southampton, whose administration Arlington had attacked, he did not achieve his ambition of the treasurership. After the fall of Clarendon, against whom he had intrigued, he did not obtain the supreme influence which he had expected. Even within the Cabal Ministry, Buckingham first equalled and soon surpassed Arlington in the royal favour. With Buckingham a sharp rivalry sprang up, and they only combined forces when endeavouring to bring about some evil measure, such as the ruin of the great Ormonde, who was an opponent of their policy and their schemes. Another object of jealousy to Arlington was Sir William Temple, who achieved great popular success in 1668 by the conclusion of the Triple Alliance; Arlington endeavoured to procure his removal to Madrid, and entered with alacrity into Charles's plans for destroying the whole policy embodied in the treaty, and for making terms with France. He refused a bribe from Louis XIV, but allowed his wife to accept a gift of 10,000 crowns; in 1670 he was the only minister besides the Roman Catholic Thomas Clifford, 1st Baron Clifford to whom the first secret treaty of Dover (May 1670), one clause of which provided for Charles's declaration of his conversion to Catholicism, was confided; and he was the chief actor in the deception practised upon the rest of the council.

== Personal views ==
He supported several other measures—the scheme for rendering the king's power absolute by force of arms; the "stop of the exchequer", involving a repudiation of the state debt in 1672; and the Royal Declaration of Indulgence the same year, "that we might keep all quiet at home whilst we are busy abroad." On 22 April 1672 he was created an earl, with a special remainder that the title would pass to his daughter, and on 15 June obtained the Order of the Garter; the same month he proceeded with Buckingham on a mission, first to William at The Hague, and afterwards to Louis at Utrecht, endeavouring to force upon the Dutch terms of peace which were indignantly refused, failing to end the Third Anglo-Dutch War. But Arlington's support of the court policy was entirely subordinate to personal interests; and after the appointment of Clifford in November 1672 to the treasurership, his jealousy and mortification, together with his alarm at the violent opposition aroused in parliament, caused him to veer over to the other side.

=== Declaration of indulgence ===
He advised Charles in March 1673 to submit the legality of the declaration of indulgence to the House of Lords, and supported the Test Act of the same year, which compelled Clifford to resign. He joined the pro-Dutch party, and in order to make his peace with his new allies, disclosed the secret treaty of Dover to the staunch Protestants Ormonde and Anthony Ashley-Cooper, 1st Earl of Shaftesbury. Arlington had, however, lost the confidence of all parties, and these efforts to procure support met with little success. On 15 January 1674 he was impeached by the Commons, the specific charges being "popery", corruption, and the betrayal of his trust – Buckingham in his own defence having accused him the day before of being the chief instigator of the French and anti-Protestant policy, of the scheme of governing by consent. But the motion for his removal, owing chiefly to the influence of his brother-in-law, the popular Lord Ossory, was rejected by 166 votes to 127. His escape could not, however, prevent his fall, and he resigned the secretaryship on 11 September 1674, being appointed Lord Chamberlain instead. In 1675 he made another attempt to gain favour with the parliament by supporting measures against France and against the Roman Catholics, and by joining in the pressure put upon Charles to remove James from the court. In November he went on a Mission to The Hague, with the popular objects of effecting peace and of concluding an alliance with William and James's daughter Mary. In this, he entirely failed, and he returned home completely discredited.

=== Treasurership ===
He had again been disappointed with the treasurership when Danby succeeded Clifford; Charles having declared "that he had too much kindness for him to let him have it for he was not fit for the office". His intrigues with discontented persons in parliament to stir up opposition to his successful rival came to nothing. From this time, though lingering on at court, he possessed no influence, and was treated with scanty respect. It was safe to ridicule his person and behaviour, and it became a common jest for "some courtier to put black patch upon his nose and strut about with a white staff in a hand in order to make the king merry at his expense". He was appointed a commissioner of the treasury in March 1679, was included in Sir William Temple's new modelled council the same year, and was a member of the inner cabinet which was most immediately formed. In 1681 he was made Lord Lieutenant of Suffolk.

== Death and inheritance ==
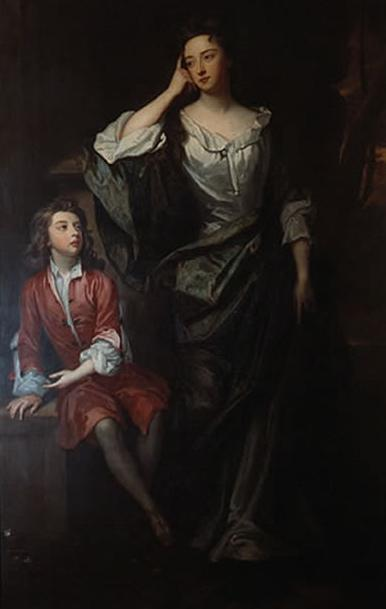
Arlington's only daughter Isabella and her son Charles FitzRoy, 2nd Duke of Grafton

He died on 28 July 1685 and was buried at Euston, where he had bought a large estate and had carried out extensive building operations. His residence in London was Arlington House, which he constructed when his previous residence Goring House burned down in 1674, this residence would be succeeded by Buckingham House which became Buckingham Palace.

His title passed, by special remainder, to his only daughter Isabella. In 1672, when she was four or five years old she married the nine-year-old Henry FitzRoy, 1st Duke of Grafton, natural son of King Charles II by Lady Castlemaine. The ceremony was repeated in 1679, presumably to allow the couple to cohabit. They had one son Charles FitzRoy, 2nd Duke of Grafton. Grafton was killed at the Siege of Cork in 1690. Isabella in 1698 remarried Sir Thomas Hanmer, 4th Baronet. She died in 1723.

== Gallery ==
Members of the Cabal ministry

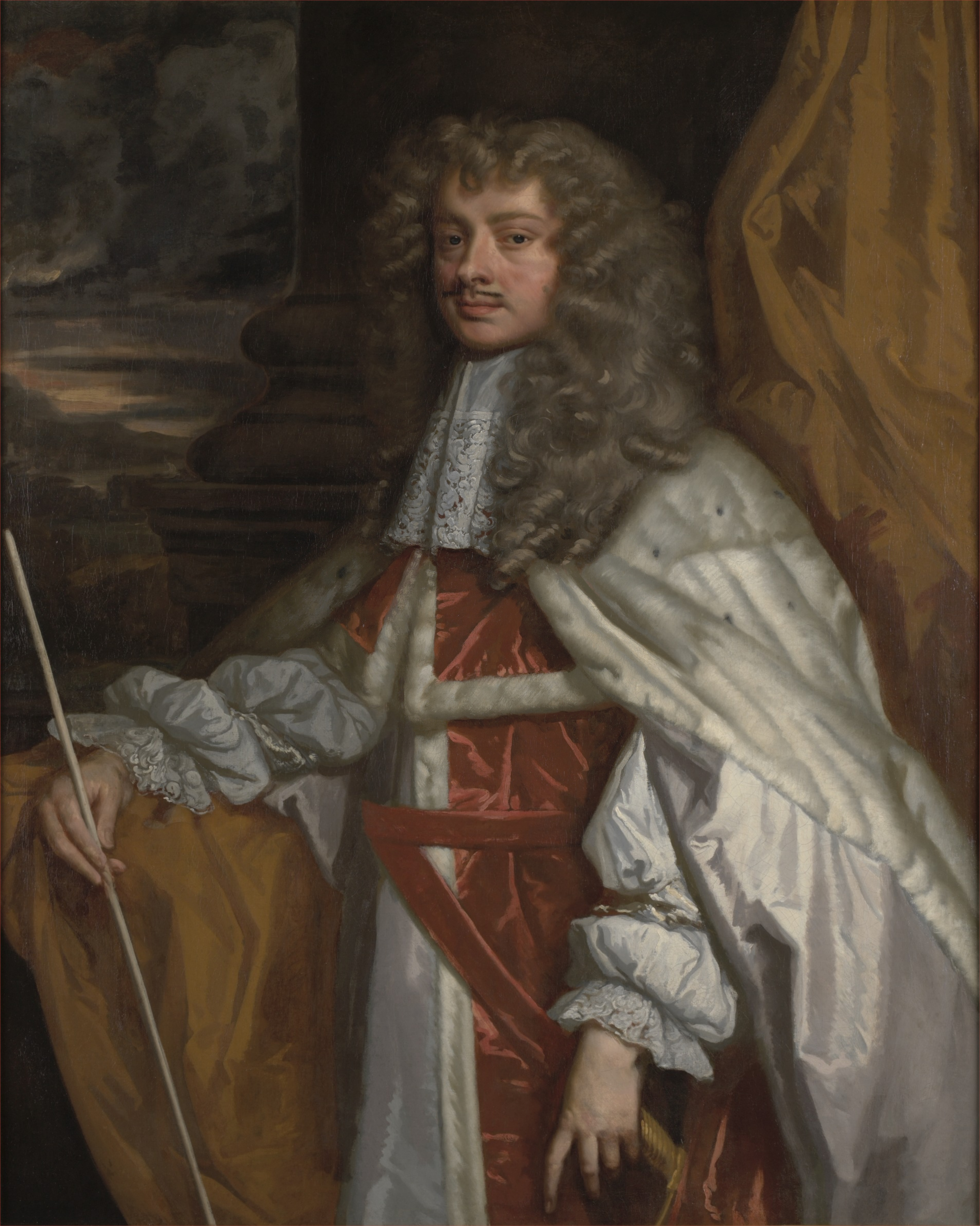
Thomas Clifford, 1st Baron Clifford of Chudleigh (1630-1673).

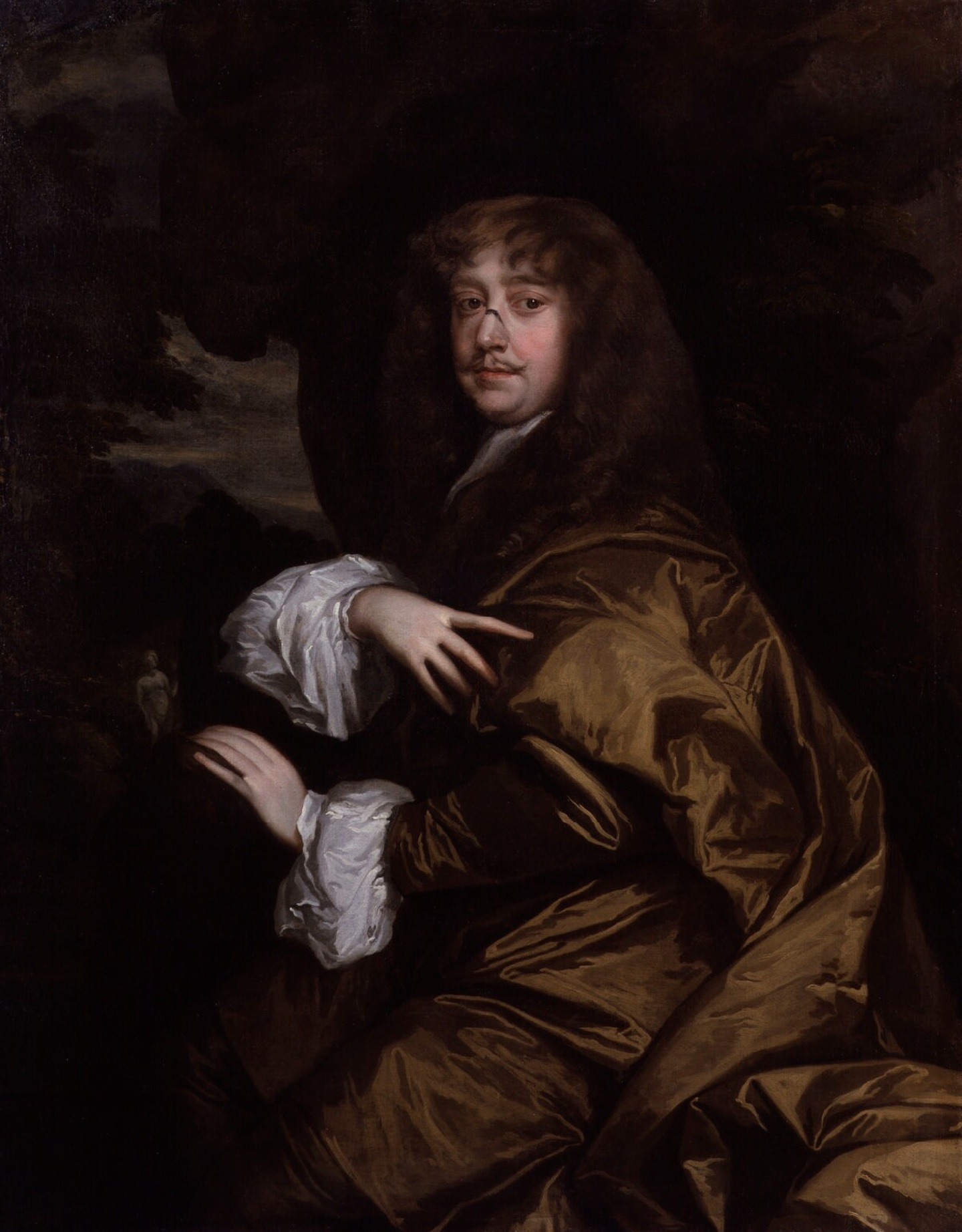
Henry Bennet, 1st Earl of Arlington (1618-1685).

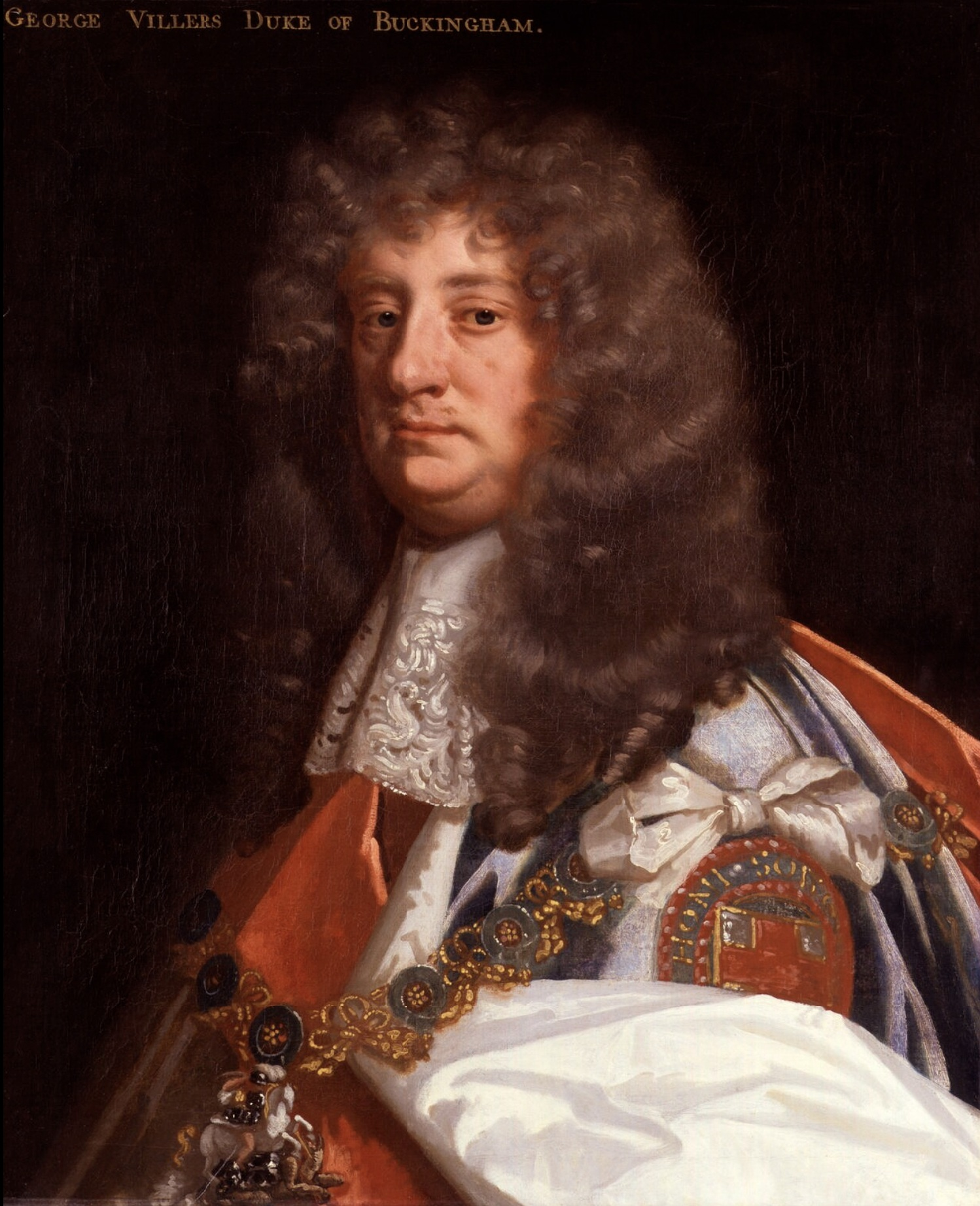
George Villiers, 2nd Duke of Buckingham (1628-1687).

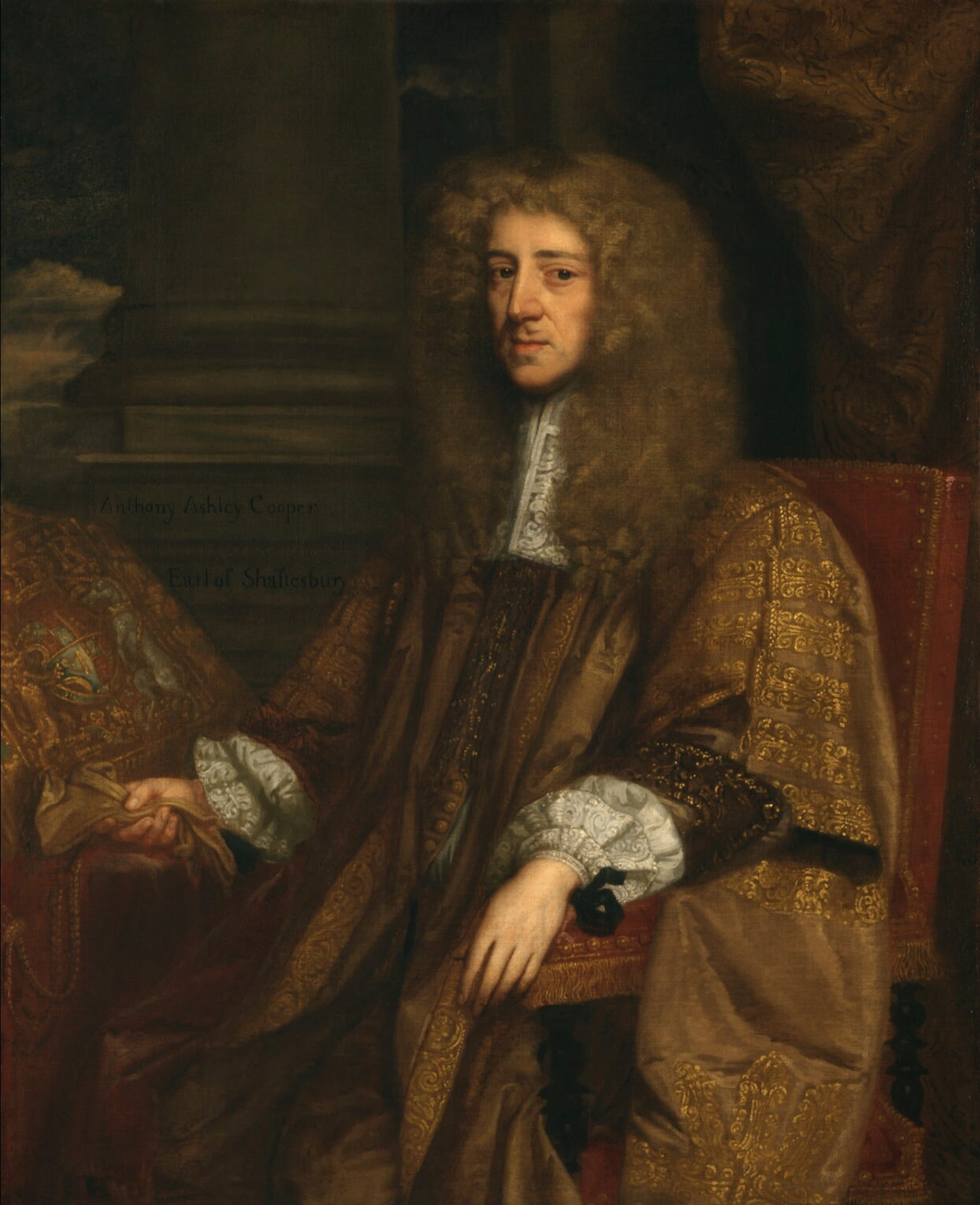
Anthony Ashley Cooper, 1st Baron Ashley of Wimborne St Giles (1621-1683).

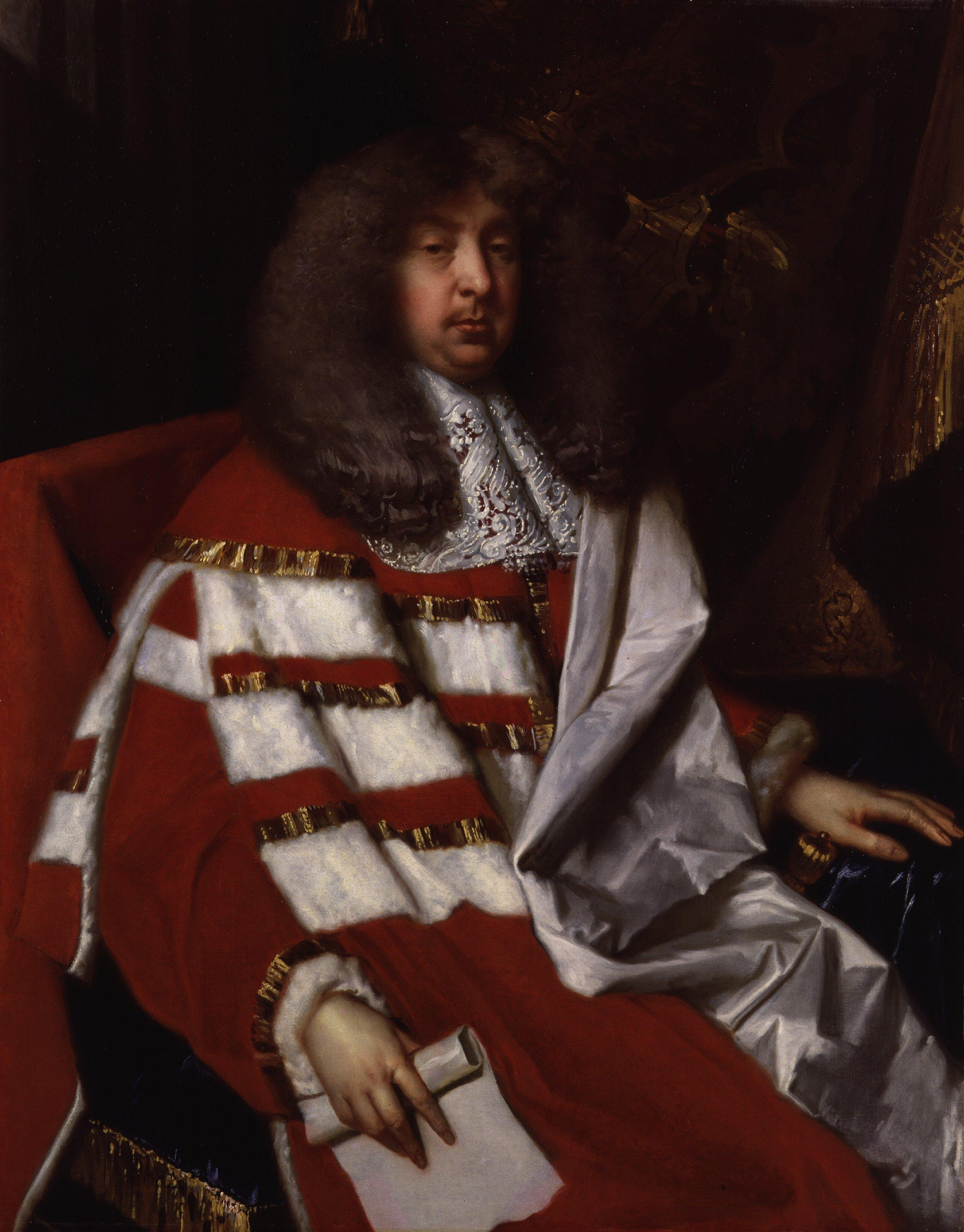
John Maitland, 1st Duke of Lauderdale (1616-1682).

== Notes ==
Political offices
Preceded by Sir Edward Nicholas	Secretary of State for the Southern Department; 1662–1674	Succeeded by Henry Coventry
Preceded by The Countess of Chesterfield	Postmaster General; 1667–1685	Succeeded by The Earl of Rochester
Preceded by The Earl of St Albans	Lord Chamberlain; 1674–1685	Succeeded by The Earl of Ailesbury
Court offices
Preceded by The Earl of Ancram	Keeper of the Privy Purse; 1661–1662	Succeeded by Charles Berkeley
Honorary titles
Preceded by The Earl of Suffolk	Lord Lieutenant of Suffolk; 1681–1685	Succeeded by The Duke of Grafton
Peerage of England
New creation	Earl of Arlington; 1672–1685	Succeeded by Isabella Bennet
New creation	Baron Arlington; 1665–1685	Succeeded by Isabella Bennet
