= Cabal ministry =

Government of England (17th century)

- 1668-1674
- Date formed: 1668; 358 years ago
- Date dissolved: 1674; 352 years ago

People and organisations
- Monarch: Charles II
- Comptroller of the Household, Treasurer of the Household, and Lord High Treasurer: Thomas Clifford, 1st Baron Clifford of Chudleigh
- Southern Secretary: Henry Bennet, 1st Earl of Arlington
- Master of the Horse: George Villiers, 2nd Duke of Buckingham
- Chancellor of the Exchequer, Lord Chancellor, and First Lord of Trade: Anthony Ashley Cooper, 1st Earl of Shaftesbury
- Secretary of State for Scotland: John Maitland, 1st Duke of Lauderdale
- Status in legislature: Minority government
- Opposition cabinet: None

History
- Election: None
- Legislature term: 2nd Parliament of Charles II
- Predecessor: Clarendon ministry
- Successor: First Danby ministry

The Cabal ministry or the CABAL /kəˈbæl/ /kəˈbɑːl/ refers to a group of high councillors of King Charles II of England, Scotland and Ireland from 1668 to c. 1674.

The term Cabal has a double meaning in this context. It refers to the fact that, for perhaps the first time in English history, effective power in a royal council was shared by a group of men, a cabal, rather than dominated by a single "favourite". The term also serves as the acronym "C-A-B-A-L" for the names of the five Privy Councillors (Clifford, Arlington, Buckingham, Ashley, and Lauderdale) who formed the council's Committee for Foreign Affairs.

Through the Foreign Affairs committee and their own offices, the five members were able to direct government policy both at home and abroad. The notion of an organized group in government, as opposed to a single royal favourite holding clear power, was seen by many as a threat to the authority of the throne. Others saw it as subverting the power of the council or of Parliament, whilst Buckingham's close relationship with the king made the Cabal unpopular with some reformers. The title "Cabal" resulted from the perception that they had conspired in Clarendon's fall and prosecution, and in its increasingly secretive conduct of government, and was helped by the fact that the initial letters of their names could be arranged to form CABAL as an acronym. However, there were sharp ideological divisions among the five, ranging from the parliamentary idealism of Ashley to the autocratic absolutism of Lauderdale.

Members of the Cabal ministry

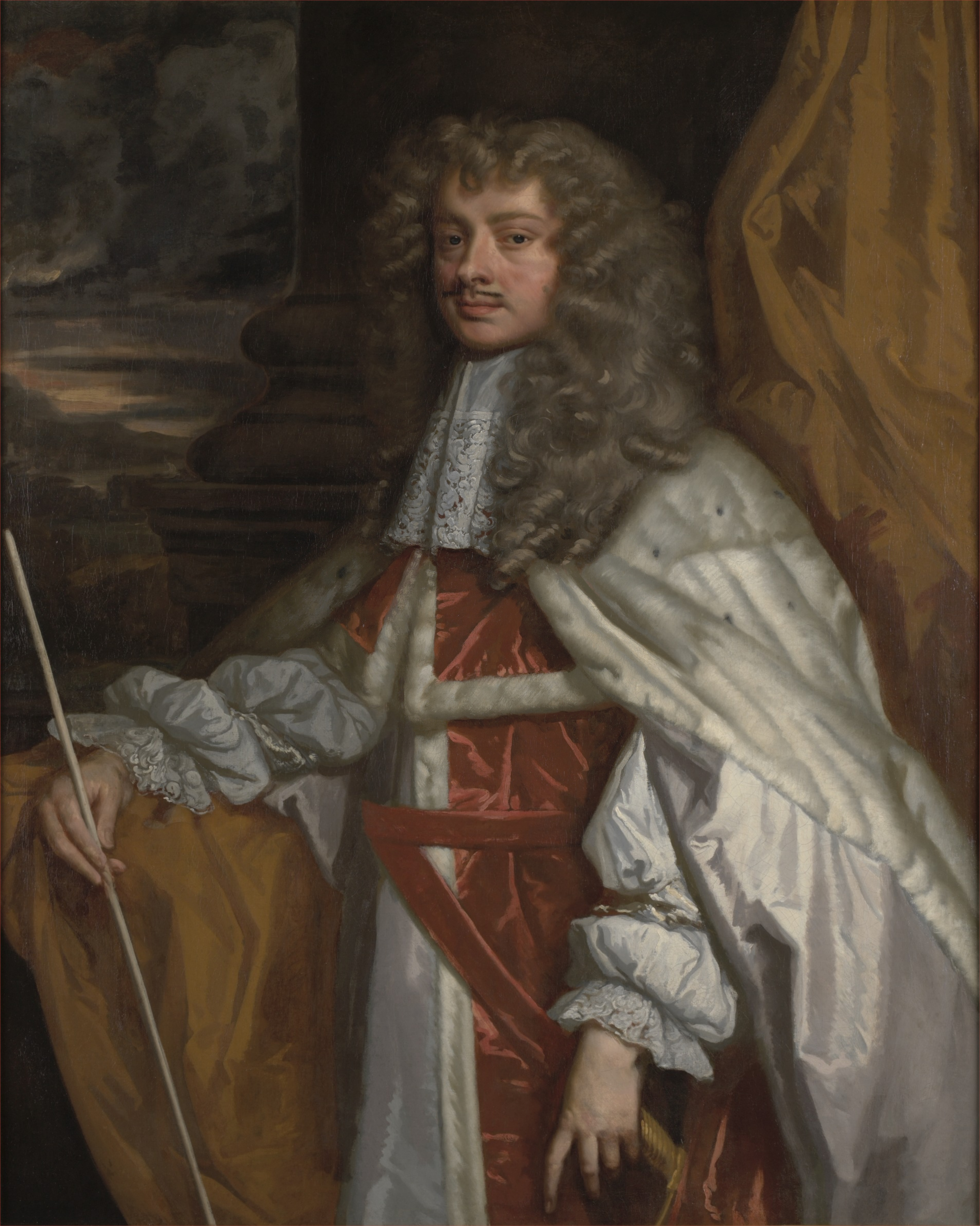
The Lord Clifford of Chudleigh
(1630–1673)

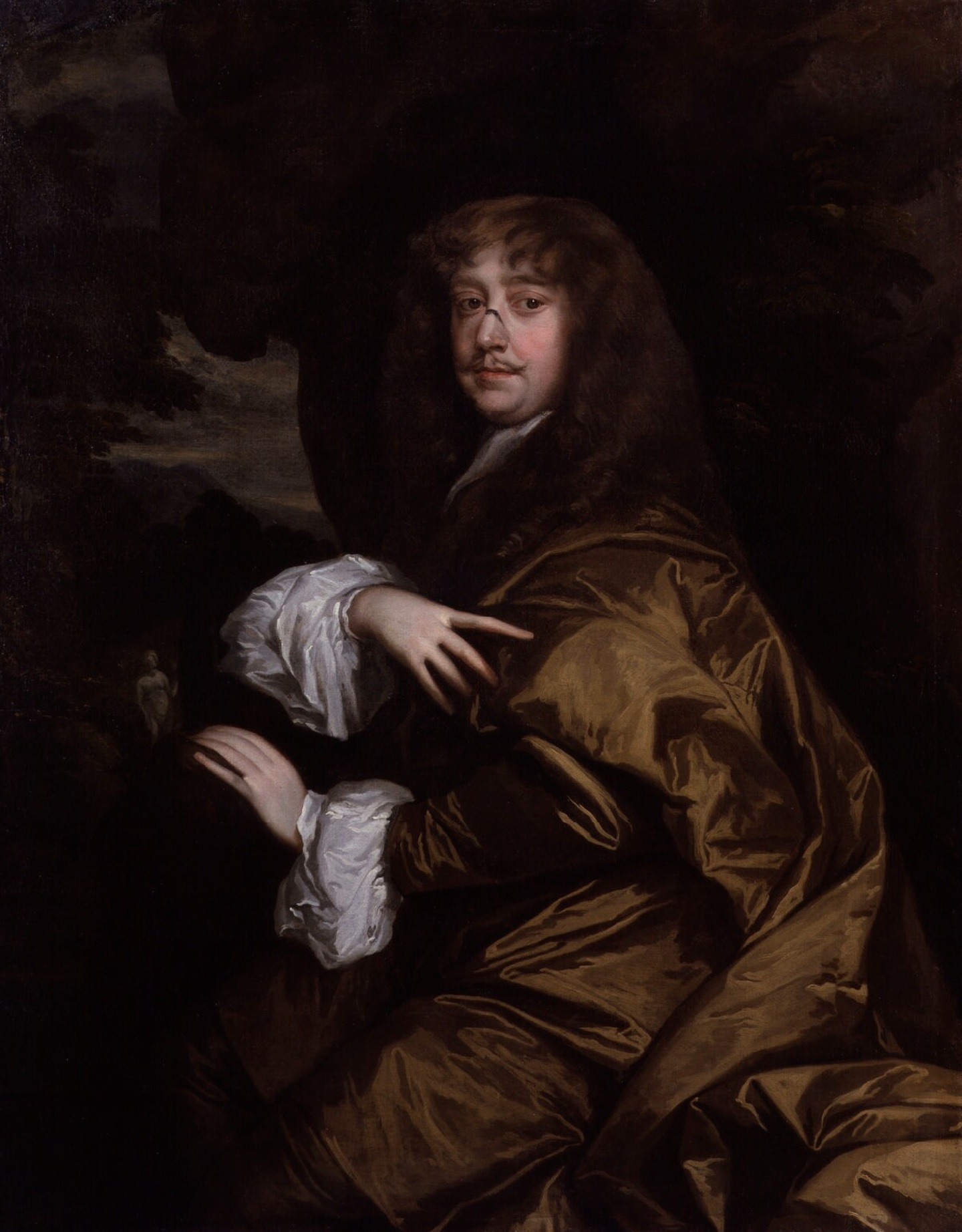
The Earl of Arlington
(1618–1685)

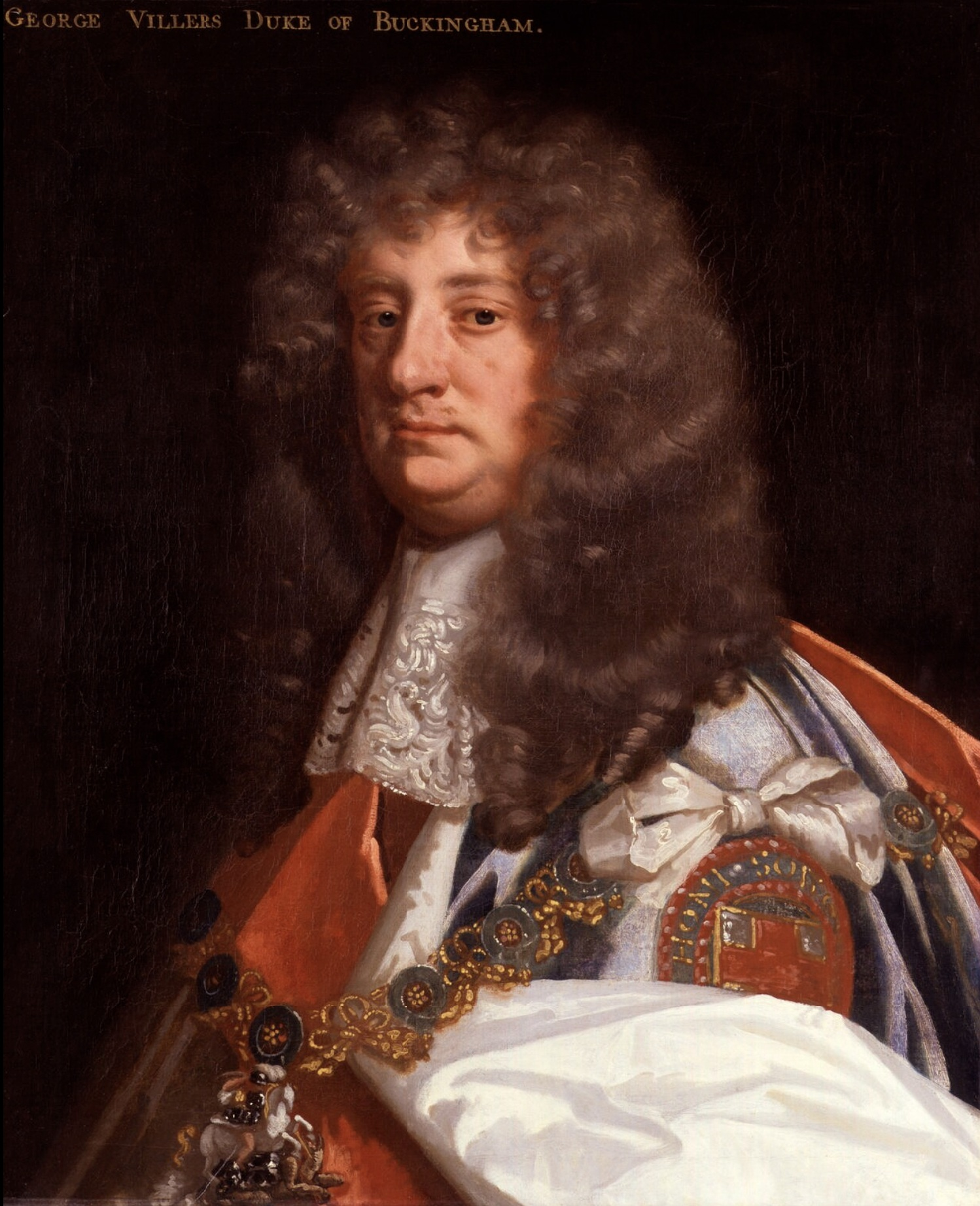
The Duke of Buckingham
(1628–1687)

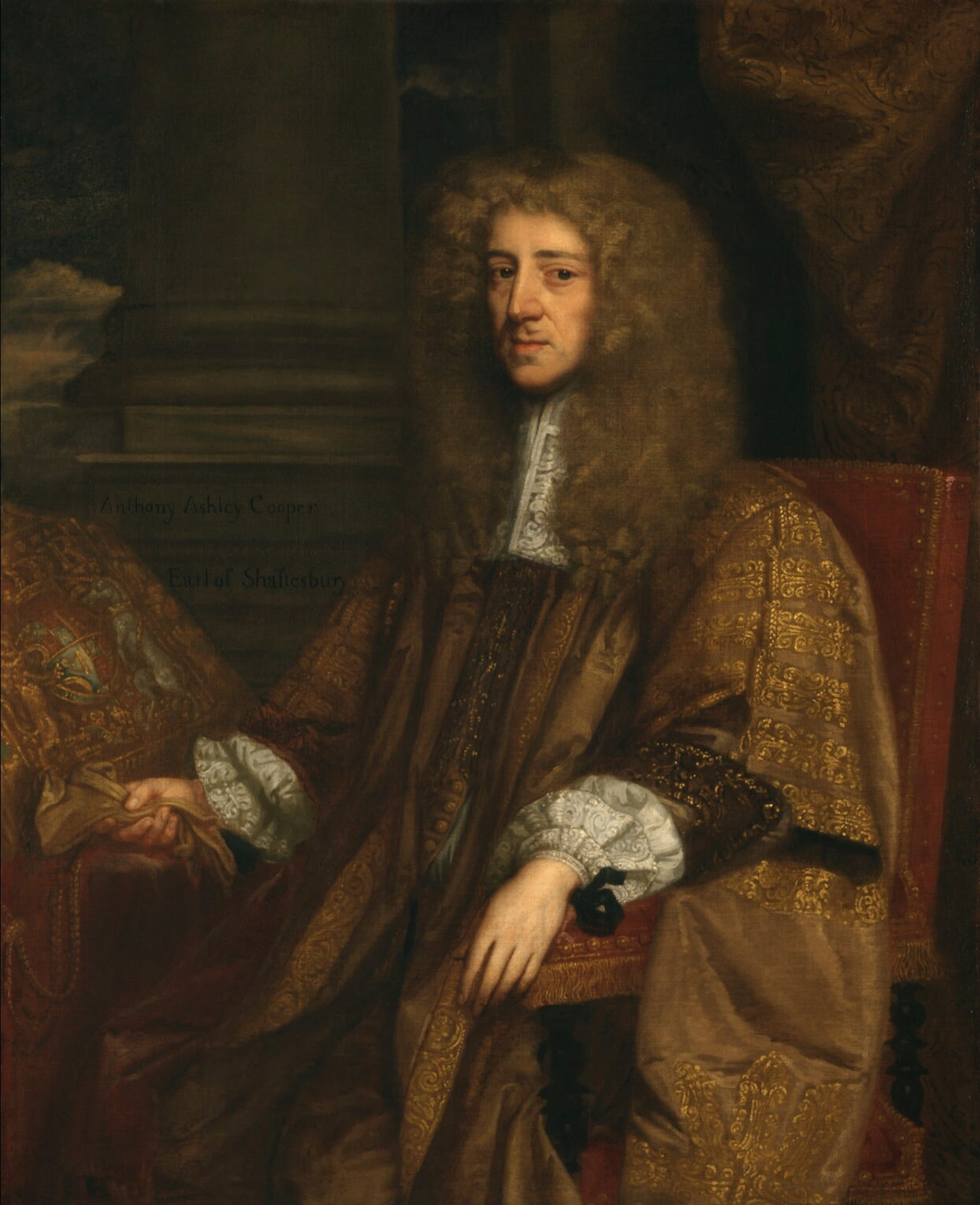
The Lord Ashley
(1621–1683)

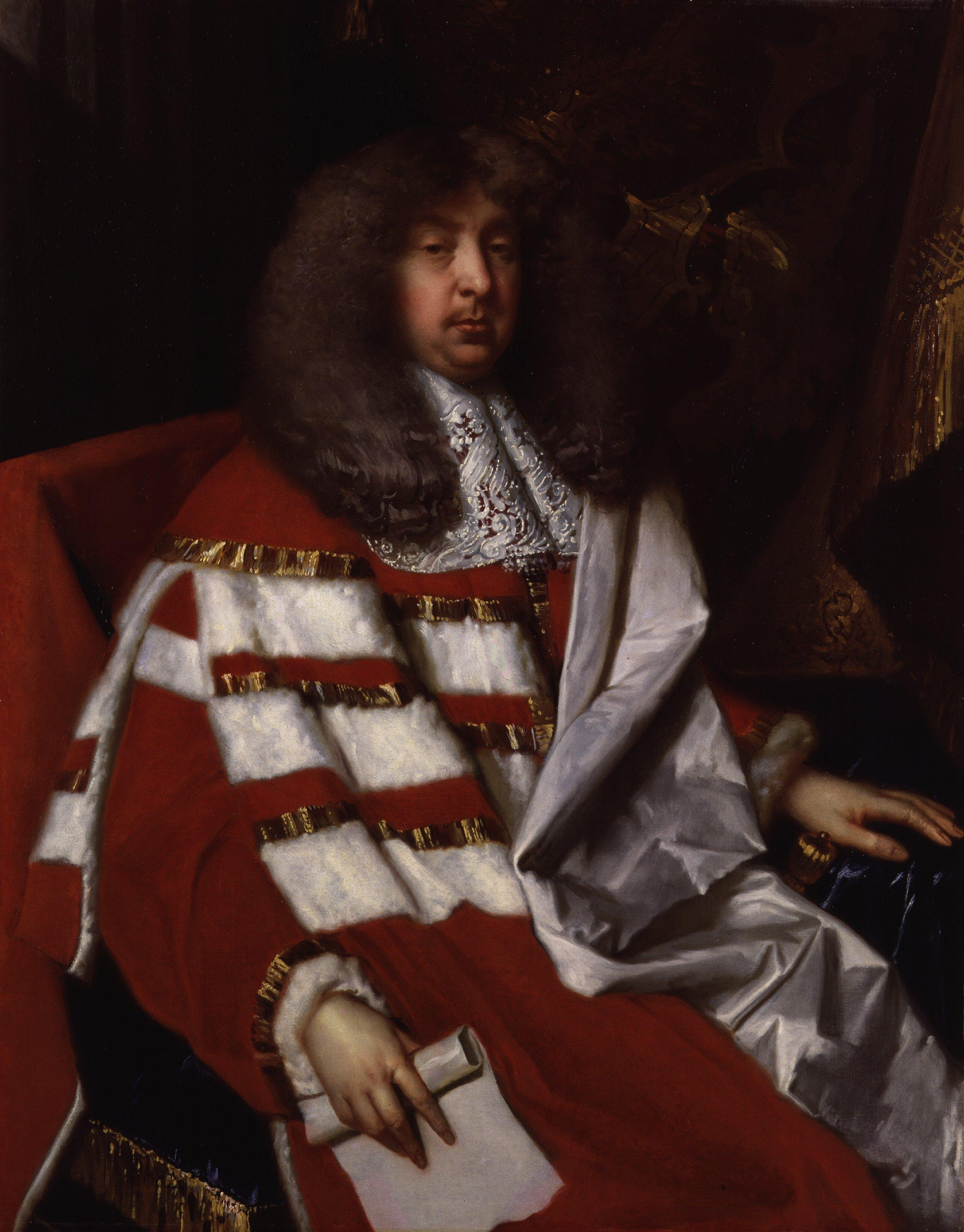
The Duke of Lauderdale
(1616–1682)

== Membership and rise ==
Following the end of Clarendon Ministry in 1667, in a cloud of accusations of incompetence and corruption, the conduct of the government of Charles II fell to a loose coalition of energetic young ministers, the "Cabal".

The linchpin of the Cabal was probably George Villiers, 2nd Duke of Buckingham. Although he only held the household office of Master of the Horse, with responsibility for overseeing the King's travel arrangements, Buckingham was a long and close associate of King Charles II, having been practically raised together since they were children, due to the close association of their fathers, Charles I and the first Duke of Buckingham, a relationship they consciously compared themselves to in adulthood, and might have replicated had the younger Buckingham possessed the 'skills' and personal qualities of his father. Nonetheless, Buckingham was in constant contact with and a clear favourite of the King, and the centre of the Cabal's grip on power. Gilbert Burnet, who knew some of its members personally, said that Buckingham stood somewhat apart from the rest of the Cabal, hating them and being hated in return.

The Lord High Treasurer Thomas Wriothesley, 4th Earl of Southampton having died just before Clarendon's departure, the Treasury went into commission in 1667, under the nominal chairmanship of George Monck, 1st Duke of Albemarle. But as Monck was practically retired from public life, control of the Treasury commission was taken up by Sir Thomas Clifford (Comptroller and soon Treasurer of the Household) and Anthony Ashley Cooper (Chancellor of the Exchequer). With the assistance of their close associates John Duncombe (Ashley's deputy at the Exchequer), Stephen Fox (the Paymaster of the Forces) and notably Sir George Downing, the highly capable secretary to the Treasury commission, Clifford and Ashley overhauled the monarchical finances, placing them in a much more solvent state than before.

Foreign affairs was principally directed by Henry Bennet, Earl of Arlington (Secretary of the South), with occasional assistance from George Villiers, Duke of Buckingham. (Although foreign affairs were notionally in the purview of the Secretary of the North, the Cabal bullied Sir William Morice into selling the seat to Sir John Trevor, and then sidelined the latter.)

John Maitland, 2nd Earl of Lauderdale (Secretary of State for Scotland) had already consolidated his position in 1663 by securing the dismissal of his principal rival, John Middleton (Lord High Commissioner to the Parliament of Scotland) and his replacement by the more pliable John Leslie, Earl of Rothes. In 1669, Lauderdale went one step further, and got Leslie dismissed and the Lord High Commissioner position for himself, consolidating his hold and ruling Scotland as a virtual autocrat for the remainder of his career.

Sir Orlando Bridgeman, the Royalist lawyer who had prosecuted the Regicides, and who took over Clarendon's duties as Lord Keeper of the Great Seal in 1667, was outside of this inner circle, although cooperative with their goals.

Despite their comparative energy and efficiency, the Cabal were a fractious and unpopular lot. Although perceived as a secretive and unsavoury junta, they rarely formed a united front, and their internal quarrels often spilled over into the public arena. John Philipps Kenyon suggests that the King actually encouraged the Cabal members to quarrel, in the belief that this made them easier to control. They in turn never trusted him not to bring them down as he had brought down Clarendon, and as Kenyon remarks, they hardly dared turn their backs on him for fear of sudden dismissal. It was said that the King treated his ministers very much as he did his mistresses: "he used them, but he was not in love with them, and was tied to them no more than they to him, which implies sufficient liberty on either side". Sir William Coventry, the Secretary to the Admiralty, resigned from office following a duel challenge from the Duke of Buckingham, and re-emerged in the House of Commons at the head of a group of MPs known as the "Country Party", which loudly opposed the Cabal and its policies. Causing poor relations with members of parliament, Charles II acceded to the Cabal's recommendation to prorogue parliament repeatedly, keeping it out of session for as long as he could, and leaving the Cabal to run the country on their own. In financial exigency (a pressing need to levy taxes), following the Great Stop of the Exchequer in 1672 and the outbreak of the Third Anglo-Dutch War, Charles was obliged to re-convene parliament in 1673 and the parliamentarians were bent on revenge.

== Split and fall ==
The Cabal began to split in 1672, particularly over the autocratic nature of the King's Royal Declaration of Indulgence, the financing of the Third Anglo-Dutch War, and England's relationship with France. Personal rivalries and a conflict over foreign policy between Buckingham and Arlington escalated. The ministry became very unpopular, characterised by arbitrary rule; the public saw them as "untrustworthy, venal and self-seeking, their eyes always on the main chance". Towards the end of the year, Ashley, now the Earl of Shaftesbury, became Lord Chancellor, leaving Treasury matters to Clifford and the Exchequer to Duncombe. He pressed publicly for greater reform of government, taking the side of the Opposition against his colleagues and the King. Clifford resigned over the in-fighting and retired from public life: as an open Catholic he would, in any case, have been debarred by the Test Act 1673 from holding office in the future. Shaftesbury was replaced by Viscount Osborne, soon to become Earl of Danby, in the summer of 1673, on the recommendation of Buckingham and Clifford. Danby immediately established his authority over the remaining members of the Cabal. Buckingham's feud with Arlington saw him leak the details of the Treaty of Dover and fall from favour in 1674. Arlington survived as Southern Secretary until September of that year. Lauderdale retained his position and his relatively autonomous power in Scotland, becoming an enemy of Shaftesbury. Shaftesbury began to agitate against Charles and his brother, the Duke of York, later James II; he briefly returned to government in the Privy Council ministry and took a lead in forming the partisan group that would eventually become known as the Whigs.

The Cabal was later called by Lord Macaulay, British historian and Whig politician, "the first germ of the present system of government by a Cabinet".

== Ministry ==
These five members made up the "cabal" (Clifford, Arlington, Buckingham, Ashley, Lauderdale), which held most of the power within the government.

Office	Name	Term	Notes
Master of the Horse	George Villiers, 2nd Duke of Buckingham	1668–1674	
Southern Secretary	Henry Bennet, 1st Baron Arlington	1667–1674	appointed 1662; created Earl of Arlington in 1672
Chancellor of the Exchequer	Anthony Ashley-Cooper, 1st Baron Ashley	1667–1672	created Earl of Shaftesbury in 1672
Lord Chancellor	Anthony Ashley-Cooper, 1st Baron Ashley	1672–1673	created Earl of Shaftesbury in 1672
First Lord of Trade	Anthony Ashley-Cooper, 1st Baron Ashley	1672–1674	created Earl of Shaftesbury in 1672
Secretary of State for Scotland	John Maitland, 2nd Earl of Lauderdale	1667–1674	created Duke of Lauderdale in 1672
Comptroller of the Household	Sir Thomas Clifford	1667–1668	created Baron Clifford of Chudleigh in 1672
Treasurer of the Household	Sir Thomas Clifford	1668–1672	created Baron Clifford of Chudleigh in 1672
Lord High Treasurer	Sir Thomas Clifford	1672–1673	created Baron Clifford of Chudleigh in 1672

The remaining members of the ministry, as would be expected, held less power than the cabal.

Office	Name	Term	Notes
Lord Keeper	Sir Orlando Bridgeman, 1st Baronet, of Great Lever	1667–1674	
First Lord of the Treasury	George Monck, 1st Duke of Albemarle	1667–1670	
Lord Privy Seal	John Robartes, 2nd Baron Robartes	1667–1674	also Lord Lieutenant of Ireland (1669–1670)
Northern Secretary	Sir William Morice, Bt.	1667–1668	
Northern Secretary	Sir John Trevor	1668–1672	
Northern Secretary	Henry Coventry	1672–1674	
Chancellor of the Exchequer	Sir John Duncombe	1672–1674	
Master-General of the Ordnance	In commission	1667–1670	
Master-General of the Ordnance	Sir Thomas Chicheley	1670–1674	
Paymaster of the Forces	Sir Stephen Fox	1667–1674	

Preceded by Clarendon ministry	Government of England; 1668–1674	Succeeded by First Danby ministry
