= Thomas Hawker =

English painter

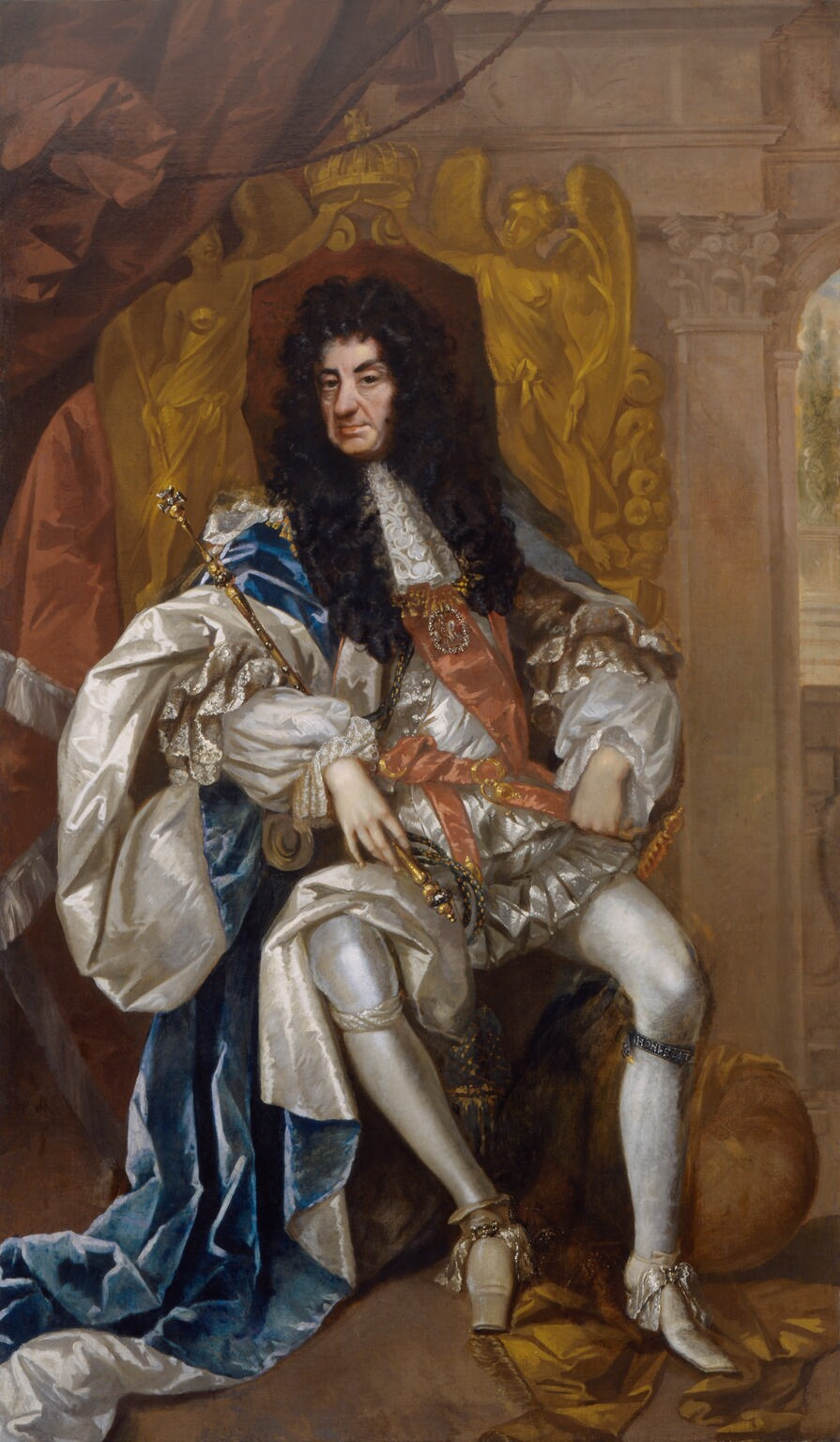
Portrait of Charles II of England Attributed to Thomas Hawker Circa 1680 (226 7 x 135.6 cm) National Portrait Gallery, London

Thomas Hawker (died 1699 or c.1722) was an English portrait painter.

There is little clear historical information about Hawker. George Vertue recorded that Hawker moved into Sir Peter Lely's house after the latter's death in 1680, in the hope of benefiting from the famous associations of the address. More recently, Ellis Waterhouse suggested that Hawker had been one of Lely's chief assistants.

A full-length portrait of Charles II, believed to be by Hawker, is in the National Portrait Gallery in London. The attribution was made on the basis of comparisons with Hawker's full-length depiction of the king's son, Henry FitzRoy, 1st Duke of Grafton, at Euston Hall. The painting of Grafton was reproduced in a mezzotint by Isaac Beckett and his portrait of Titus Oates was engraved by Cornelius Nicolas Schurtz

The date of his death has often been given as c.1722, on the basis of Vertue's reference to a painter called Edward Hawker, who was still alive, aged over 80, in 1721. Waterhouse. however, believes that there is no reason to equate Edward and Thomas, and that the artist is more likely to have been the Thomas Hawker who was buried at Covent Garden on 5 November 1699.

== Sources ==
- Stephen, Leslie; Lee, Sidney, eds. (1891). "Hawker, Thomas" . Dictionary of National Biography. Vol. 25. London: Smith, Elder & Co.
