= Thomas Berry (politician) =

English politician

Sir Thomas Berry (died 1698), of Burrough, Northam, Devon, was an English politician.

He was a member (MP) of the parliament of England for Totnes in 1673.
