= Thomas Chafe (Totnes MP) =

English lawyer and politician

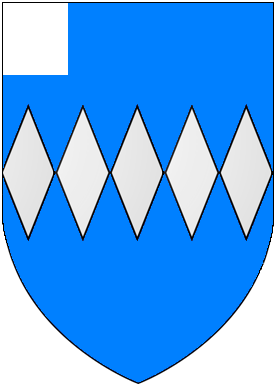
Arms of Chafe: Azure, five fusils in fesse argent a canton of the last. As shown on the monument to his uncle Thomas Chafe (1585–1648) of Dodscott, in St Giles' Church, St Giles in the Wood, Devon

Thomas Chafe (c. 1611 – 1662) was an English lawyer and politician who sat in the House of Commons in 1660.

Chafe was the son of John Chafe, a merchant of Exeter, Devon and his wife Anne May, daughter of William May of North Molton, Devon. His father died in 1619. He was a student of Middle Temple in 1631 and was called to the bar in 1638. He became a Bencher of Middle Temple in 1659. In 1660, he was elected member of parliament for Totnes. He was a J.P. for Dorset from July 1660 and a commissioner for assessment from August 1660.

Chafe died at the age of about 50 and was buried in the Temple Church on 3 July 1662.

Chafe married by licence dated 28 December 1641 Catherine Malet, daughter of Sir Thomas Malet, of St. Audries, Somerset and had a son and five daughters.

Parliament of England
Preceded by Oliver St John; John Maynard	Member of Parliament for Totnes; 1660; With: Thomas Clifford	Succeeded by Thomas Clifford; Sir Edward Seymour, 3rd Baronet
