= Isaac Beckett =

British engraver

- Born: 1653; Kent
- Died: 1719; London
- Occupations: Printmaker, drawer, printer, copper engraver

Isaac Beckett (1653 – 1719) was an English mezzotint engraver, one of the first practitioners of the art in the country.

== Life and work ==
Beckett was born in Kent in 1653, and apprenticed to a calico printer in London, but, after meeting Edward Luttrell, he decided to learn the new art of engraving in mezzotint. Hearing that one John Lloyd was acquainted with the process, and being obliged through an intrigue to absent himself from his business, Beckett offered his services to him, and entered into articles to work for him. Before long, however, he again fell into trouble, and was assisted by Luttrell, with whom he became associated in the development of the art.

He is said to have married a woman of fortune, which enabled him to set up as the publisher of his own prints. Luttrell did many heads for him, being more skilful in drawing than Beckett, but they were often finished by the latter. His plates are all referable to dates between 1681 and 1688, although he lived until 1719.

Beckett and Robert Williams were the first native Englishmen who extensively practised engraving in mezzotint, and, in a measure, may be considered to have founded the school, for the earlier works were executed chiefly by engravers of foreign birth. John Smith (1652?–1742) was Beckett's pupil, and appears to have obtained possession of many of his plates and to have placed his own name on them, not only as publisher, but on some even as engraver.

Beckett engraved several biblical and allegorical subjects and as a few landscapes, but the great majority of his plates are portraits, of which 107 are known.

=== Engraved Portraits ===
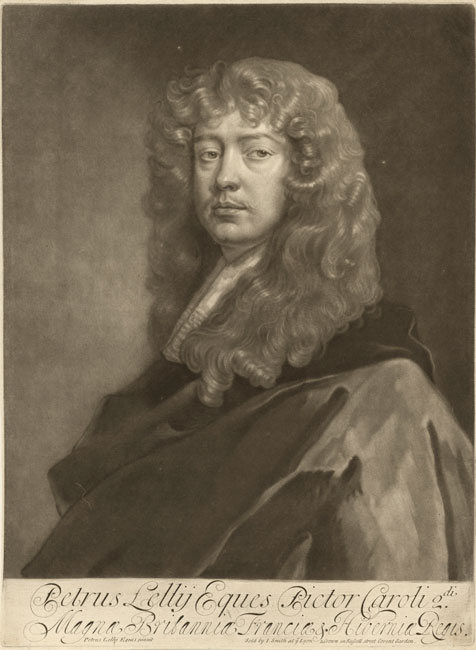
Peter Lely, engraving by Beckett and John Smith after a self-portrait, c. 1684.

His engraved portraits include:

- Sir Godfrey Kneller (from a picture by Kneller).
- Charles II (after Kneller).
- James, Duke of York (after the same).
- Henry, Duke of Grafton (after T. Hawker).
- The Duchess of Grafton; after Wissing.
- Charles Melford (after the same).
- Sir Peter Lely ("Se ipse pinx" - see illustration above)
- George, Prince of Denmark (after Riley).
- Henry Compton, Bishop of London (after the same).
- Christopher, Earl of Albemarle (after Murray).
- George, Duke of Buckingham (after Verhelst).
- John Maitland, Duke of Lauderdale (after Riley).
- Henry, Duke of Norfolk.
- Thomas Cartwright, Bishop of Chester .
- Lady Williams (full length).
- Adrian Beverland (drawn from a statue).

Beckett's own portrait was engraved by his pupil John Smith and others.

=== Engraved Subjects ===
- The Virgin Mary and St. Joseph, with the Infant Jesus asleep, with two Angels (painter unnamed).
- Time cutting the Wings of Love.
- Cupid and Psyche (after Alessandro Turchi).
- A Landscape, with a Shepherd and Shepherdess.
- The Dutch Schoolmaster (after Heemskerk).
- The Village Barber Surgeon (after J. Lingelbach).
