= List of English chief ministers =

Chief minister is a term used retroactively by the historian Clive Bigham to describe servants of the English monarch who presided over the government of England, and after 1707, Great Britain, before 1721. Chief ministers were usually one of the great officers of state, but it was not unusual for there to be no chief minister.

Under the Norman and Angevin kings, the justiciar was often chief minister. When kings left England to oversee other parts of the Angevin Empire, the justiciar functioned as his viceroy or regent. In the 13th century, after the loss of the Angevin territories in France, the justiciar's power declined as monarchs resided permanently in England.

For the next three centuries, the Lord Chancellor was most often chief minister. The chancellor served as Keeper of the Great Seal, presided over the Privy Council and Parliament, and led the High Court of Chancery. After the English Reformation, the chancellor's power shifted to the Lord High Treasurer. After 1721, the office of prime minister became the head of British governments.

== List of chief ministers ==
Minister		Birth	Death	Formal office(s)	Monarch
Dunstan, Archbishop of Canterbury; 946–955		c. 920, near Glastonbury Son of Thegn Heorstan and Cynethryth	19 May 988	Treasurer, Chancellor	Eadred (946–955)
No informal holder; personal rule of King Eadwig (955–959)
Dunstan, Archbishop of Canterbury; 959–978		c. 920, near Glastonbury Son of Thegn Heorstan and Cynethryth	19 May 988	Chancellor	Edgar (959–975)
No informal holder (978–1021)
Godwin, Earl of Wessex; 1022–1053		c. 988; England Son of Wulfnoth Cild	15 April 1053	Justiciar, Treasurer	Cnut (1016–1035); Harold I (1035–1040); Harthacnut (1040–1042); Edward the Confessor (1042–1066)
Harold, Earl of Wessex; 1053–1066		c. 1022; England Son of Godwin, Earl of Wessex and Gytha Thorkelsdóttir	14 October 1066	—N/a	Cnut (1016–1035); Harold I (1035–1040); Harthacnut (1040–1042); Edward the Confessor (1042–1066)
No informal holder; personal rule of King William I (1066–1087)
Ranulf Flambard, Bishop of Durham; 1089–1100		c. 1060, near Bayeux Son of Thurstin	5 September 1128, Durham	Treasurer, Justiciar, Keeper of the Great Seal	William II (1087–1100)
Roger, Bishop of Salisbury; 1100–1135		c. 1070 – c. 1080; Normandy	11 December 1139, Salisbury	Lord Chancellor, Justiciar	Henry I (1100–1135)
No informal holder; personal rule of King Stephen (1135–1154)
Thomas Becket, Archbishop of Canterbury; 1155–1162		21 December 1118, London Son of Gilbert and Matilda Beket	29 December 1170, Canterbury	Lord Chancellor	Henry II (1154–1189)
No informal holder; personal rule of king Henry II (1162–1189)					Henry II (1154–1189)
William de Longchamp, Bishop of Ely; 1190–1191		Normandy Son of Hugh de Longchamp and Eve de Lacy	January 1197; Poitiers	Justiciar, Lord Chancellor	Richard I (1189–1199)
Walter de Coutances, Archbishop of Rouen; 1191–1194		Cornwall Son of Reinfrid and Gonilla	16 November 1207	Justiciar	Richard I (1189–1199)
No informal holder; personal rule of King Richard I (1194–1199)					Richard I (1189–1199)
William Marshal, 1st Earl of Pembroke; 1213–1216		c. 1145; Wiltshire Son of John Marshall and Sybilla of Salisbury	14 May 1219, Caversham	Lord Marshal	John (1199–1216)
William Marshal, 1st Earl of Pembroke; 1216–1219		c. 1145 Wiltshire Son of John Marshall and Sybilla of Salisbury	14 May 1219, Caversham	Regent, Lord Marshal	Henry III (1216–1272)
Hubert de Burgh, Earl of Kent; 1219–1232		c. 1175; Norfolk Son of Reyner de Burgh	c. 5 May 1243; Banstead	Regent (1219–1227), Justiciar	Henry III (1216–1272)
Peter des Roches, Bishop of Winchester; 1232–1234		—N/a	9 June 1238	—N/a	Henry III (1216–1272)
Personal rule (1234–1258); Council of Fifteen (1258–1261); Personal rule (1262–1264)					Henry III (1216–1272)
Simon de Montfort, 6th Earl of Leicester; 1264–1265		c. 1208; Montfort-l'Amaury Son of Simon de Montfort, 5th Earl of Leicester and Alix de Montmorency	4 August 1265, Evesham	Lord High Steward, Protector of the Realm	Henry III (1216–1272)
No informal holder; personal rule of King Henry III (1265–1272)					Henry III (1216–1272)
Regents: Walter Giffard, Roger Mortimer, and Robert Burnell (1272–1274)					Edward I (1272–1307)
Robert Burnell, Bishop of Bath and Wells; 1274–1292		c. 1235; Acton Burnell Son of Robert Burnell	25 October 1292, Berwick-upon-Tweed	Lord Chancellor	Edward I (1272–1307)
No informal holder; personal rule of King Edward II (1307–1327)
No informal holder; personal rule of King Edward III (1327–1330)					Edward III (1327–1377)
John de Stratford, Archbishop of Canterbury; 1330–1340		c.1275, Stratford-on-Avon; Son of Robert de Stratford	23 August 1348, Mayfield, Sussex; Aged c. 73	Lord Chancellor	Edward III (1327–1377)
No informal holder; personal rule of King Edward III (1340–1367)					Edward III (1327–1377)
William of Wykeham, Bishop of Winchester; 1367–1371		1320 or 1324; Son of John Longe	27 September 1404, Bishop's Waltham; Aged c. 82	Lord Chancellor	Edward III (1327–1377)
No informal holder; personal rule of King Edward III (1371–1377)					Edward III (1327–1377)
No informal holder; personal rule of King Richard II (1377–1389)					Richard II (1377–1399)
William of Wykeham, Bishop of Winchester; 1389–1391		1320 or 1324; Son of John Longe	27 September 1404, Bishop's Waltham; Aged c. 82	Lord Chancellor	Richard II (1377–1399)
No informal holder; personal rule of King Richard II (1391–1399)					Richard II (1377–1399)
No informal holder; personal rule of King Henry IV (1399–1413)
Henry Beaufort, Cardinal Bishop of Winchester; 1413–1417		1375 Son of John of Gaunt and Katherine Swynford	11 April 1447, Wolvesey Castle; Aged 71–72	Lord Chancellor	Henry V (1413–1422)
No informal holder; personal rule of king Henry V (1417–1422)					Henry V (1413–1422)
John of Lancaster, Duke of Bedford; 1422–1435 & Humphrey, Duke of Gloucester; 1422–1437 See Regency government, 1422–1437		1389 Son of Henry Bolingbroke and Mary de Bohun, 1390 Son of Henry Bolingbroke and Mary de Bohun	14 September 1435, Rouen; Aged 46, 23 February 1447, Bury St Edmunds; Aged 56	Lord Protector (Jointly), Constable of England (Bedford, possibly), Regent of France (Bedford) & Lord Warden of the Cinque Ports (Gloucester), Justice in Eyre south of Trent (Gloucester)	Henry VI (1422–1461)
Henry Beaufort, Cardinal Bishop of Winchester; 1437–1447		1375 Son of John of Gaunt and Katherine Swynford	11 April 1447, Wolvesey Castle; Aged 71–72	—N/a	Henry VI (1422–1461)
William de la Pole, 1st Duke of Suffolk; 1447–1450		1375 Son of Michael de la Pole, 2nd Earl of Suffolk and Katherine de Stafford	2 May 1450, English Channel; Aged 53	Lord High Admiral	Henry VI (1422–1461)
No informal holder; personal rule of king Henry VI (1450–1454)					Henry VI (1422–1461)
Richard of York, 3rd Duke of York; 1454–1455		1411 Son of Richard of Conisburgh and Anne Mortimer	30 December 1460, Sandal Magna; Aged 49	Lord Protector, Lieutenant of Ireland	Henry VI (1422–1461)
No informal holder; personal rule of king Henry VI (February 1455–November 1455)					Henry VI (1422–1461)
Richard of York, 3rd Duke of York; 1455–1456		1411 Son of Richard of Conisburgh and Anne Mortimer	30 December 1460, Sandal Magna; Aged 49	Lord Protector, Lieutenant of Ireland	Henry VI (1422–1461)
No informal holder; personal rule of king Henry VI (1460–1461)					Henry VI (1422–1461)
Richard Neville, 16th Earl of Warwick "Warwick the Kingmaker""; 1461–1467		1428, England Son of Richard Neville, 5th Earl of Salisbury and Alice Montacute, 5th Countess of Salisbury	14 April 1471, Battle of Barnet; Aged 42	Lord High Admiral, Captain of Calais, Steward of the Duchy of Lancaster, Lord Warden of the Cinque Ports	Edward IV (1461–1470)
No informal holder; personal rule of king Edward IV (1467–1470)					Edward IV (1461–1470)
Richard Neville, 16th Earl of Warwick "Warwick the Kingmaker"; 1470–1471 (Readeption of Henry VI)		1428, England Son of Richard Neville, 5th Earl of Salisbury and Alice Montacute, 5th Countess of Salisbury	14 April 1471, Battle of Barnet; Aged 42	Lord High Admiral, Captain of Calais, Lord Warden of the Cinque Ports	Henry VI (1470–1471)
No informal holder; personal rule of king Edward IV (1471–1475)					Edward IV (1461–1470, 1471–1483)
Thomas Rotherham, Bishop of Lincoln; 1475–1483		1423, England Son of Thomas Rotherham and Dame Alice Rotherham	29 May 1500, Cawood Castle; Aged 76	Keeper of the Privy Seal, Lord Chancellor	Edward IV (1461–1470, 1471–1483)
Richard, Duke of Gloucester; 30 April 1483 – 25 June 1483		1452, England Richard of York and Cecily Neville	22 August 1485, Bosworth Field; Aged 32	Lord Protector of the Realm	Edward V (9 April 1483 – 25 June 1483)
No informal holder; personal rule of King Richard III (1483–1485)
Thomas Stanley, 1st Earl of Derby; 1485–1504		1435, England Son of Thomas Stanley, 1st Baron Stanley and Joan Goushill	29 July 1504, Lancashire; Aged 68–69	Lord High Constable	Henry VII (1485–1509)
Richard Empson & Edmund Dudley; 1505–1509	Empson (left) and Dudley (right) with Henry VII	1450, England Son of Peter Empson and Elizabeth Joseph 1462 or 1471, England Son of John Dudley and Elizabeth Bramshot	17 August 1510, Tower Hill; Executed for treason Aged 59–60 and 39–47 (respectively)	Chancellor of the Duchy of Lancaster (Empson) & President of the King's Council (Dudley)	Henry VII (1485–1509)
No informal holder; personal rule of king Henry VIII (1509–1514)					Henry VIII (1509–1547)
Cardinal Thomas Wolsey, Archbishop of York; 1514–1529		March 1473, Ipswich Son of Robert Wolsey and Joan Daundy	29 November 1530, Leicester; Aged 57	Lord Chancellor, Papal Legate in England	Henry VIII (1509–1547)
Thomas More; 1529–1532		7 February 1478, London Son of John More and Agnes Graunger	6 July 1535, Tower Hill; Executed for treason Aged 57	Lord Chancellor	Henry VIII (1509–1547)
Thomas Cromwell, 1st Earl of Essex (1540); 1532–1540		1485, Putney Son of Walter Cromwell and Katherine Williams	28 July 1540, Tower Hill; Executed for treason Aged 54–55	Chancellor of the Exchequer, Lord Privy Seal, Secretary of State, Master of the Rolls, Clerk of the Hanaper, Master of King's Jewel House, Lord Great Chamberlain, Governor of the Isle of Wight, Surveyor of the King's Woods, Trier/Receiver of Petitions in the Lords, Warden and Chief Justice in Eyre, North of Trent	Henry VIII (1509–1547)
Thomas Howard, 3rd Duke of Norfolk; 1540–1546		1473, England Son of Thomas Howard, 2nd Duke of Norfolk and Elizabeth Tilney, Countess of Surrey	25 August 1554, Kenninghall; Aged 80–81	Lord High Treasurer, Earl Marshal, Lieutenant-General of the army	Henry VIII (1509–1547)
Edward Seymour, 1st Duke of Somerset; 1547–1549		1500, England Son of John Seymour and Margery Wentworth	22 January 1552, Tower Hill; Executed for treason Aged 50–51	Lord Protector of the Realm, Lord High Treasurer, Earl Marshal	Edward VI (1547–1553) and Jane (1553)
John Dudley, 1st Earl of Warwick then 1st Duke of Northumberland; 1549–1553		1504, London Son of Edmund Dudley and Elizabeth Grey	22 August 1553, Tower Hill; Executed for treason Aged 48–49	Lord Great Chamberlain, Lord President of the Council, Grandmaster of the Household	Edward VI (1547–1553) and Jane (1553)
Stephen Gardiner, Bishop of Winchester; 1553–1555		1483, Bury St Edmunds Son of John or William Gardiner and Ellen/Helen Tudor	12 November 1555, London; Aged 71–72	Lord Chancellor	Mary I (1553–1558)
Cardinal Reginald Pole, Archbishop of Canterbury; 1555–1558		3 March 1500, Stourton Son of Richard Pole and Margaret Pole, Countess of Salisbury	17 November 1558, London; Aged 58	Papal Legate to England	Mary I (1553–1558)
William Cecil, 1st Baron Burghley; 1558–1598		13 September 1520, Bourne Son of Richard Cecil and Jane Heckington	4 August 1598, Westminster; Aged 77	Lord High Treasurer, Lord Privy Seal, Secretary of State	Elizabeth I (1558–1603)
Robert Cecil; 1598–1603		1563, Westminster Son of William Cecil, 1st Baron Burghley and Mildred Cooke	24 May 1612, Marlborough, Wiltshire; Aged 48	Lord Privy Seal, Secretary of State, Chancellor of the Duchy of Lancaster	Elizabeth I (1558–1603)
Robert Cecil, Baron Cecil then (1605); 1st Earl of Salisbury; 1603 – 1612		1 June 1563, Westminster Son of William Cecil, 1st Baron Burghley and Mildred Cooke	24 May 1612, Marlborough; Aged 48	Lord High Treasurer, Lord Privy Seal	James I (1603–1625)
Henry Howard, 1st Earl of Northampton; 1612 – 1614		25 February 1540, Shotesham Son of Henry Howard, Earl of Surrey and Frances de Vere	15 June 1614, Westminster; Aged 74	First Lord of the Treasury, Lord Privy Seal	James I (1603–1625)
Robert Carr, 1st Earl of Somerset; 1614 – 1615		c. 1587, Wrington Son of Thomas Kerr (Carr) and Janet Scott	17 July 1645, Dorset; Aged 57–58	Lord Warden of the Cinque Ports, Lord Chamberlain, Lord Privy Seal	James I (1603–1625)
No informal holder; personal rule of king James I (1615–1617)					James I (1603–1625)
Francis Bacon, Baron Verulam (1618); 1617 – 1621		22 January 1561, Strand, London Son of Nicholas Bacon and Anne Cooke	9 April 1626, Highgate; Aged 65	Lord Chancellor	James I (1603–1625)
George Villiers, ennobled (1623); 1st Duke of Buckingham; 1623 – 1628		28 August 1592, Brooksby Son of George Villiers and Mary Beaumont	23 August 1628, Portsmouth; Assassinated by John Felton; Aged 35	Lord Warden of the Cinque Ports, Lord High Admiral, Master of the Horse	James I (1603–1625)
George Villiers, ennobled (1623); 1st Duke of Buckingham; 1623 – 1628		28 August 1592, Brooksby Son of George Villiers and Mary Beaumont	23 August 1628, Portsmouth; Assassinated by John Felton; Aged 35	Lord Warden of the Cinque Ports, Lord High Admiral, Master of the Horse	Charles I (1625–1649) Since 1642 in status of civil war
Richard Weston, Baron Weston then 1st Earl of Portland; 1628 – 1634/35		1 March 1577, Essex Son of Jerome Weston and Mary Cave	13 March 1634/35, prob. Westminster; Aged 57/58	Lord High Treasurer, First Lord of the Admiralty	Charles I (1625–1649) Since 1642 in status of civil war
No informal holder; personal rule of king Charles I (1635–1640)					Charles I (1625–1649) Since 1642 in status of civil war
Thomas Wentworth, 1st Earl of Strafford; 1640 – 1641		13 April 1593, London Son of William Wentworth and Anne Atkins	12 May 1641, Tower Hill; Executed for conspiracy Aged 48	Lord Lieutenant of Ireland	Charles I (1625–1649) Since 1642 in status of civil war
Robert Bertie, 1st Earl of Lindsey; 1641 – 1642		16 December 1582, England Son of Peregrine Bertie and Mary de Vere	24 October 1642, Battle of Edgehill; Aged 59	Lord Great Chamberlain	Charles I (1625–1649) Since 1642 in status of civil war
Prince Rupert, Count Palatine of the Rhine; 1642 – 1646		17 December 1619, Prague Son of Frederick V, Elector Palatine and Elizabeth Stuart	29 November 1682, Westminster; Aged 62	—N/a	Charles I (1625–1649) Since 1642 in status of civil war
Imprisonment of king Charles I until his execution (1646–1649)					Charles I (1625–1649) Since 1642 in status of civil war

== Stuart Restoration ==
This is very true: for my words are my own, and my actions are my ministers.

— King Charles II, reply to Lord Rochester's epitaph on him (Knowles 1999, p. 203)

In 1660, the leadership of the Commonwealth recalled Charles II and the chief minister became responsible to some extent to Parliament as leader of a ministry, although much of the time King Charles was in effect his own chief minister. The Glorious Revolution of 1688–89 furthered this process and by the time of Queen Anne in 1702, monarchs had little choice as to who their ministers would be.

Minister(s) (Lifespan)		Party	Term of office		Ministerial offices	Election	Ministry	Monarch
	Edward Hyde, 1st Earl of Clarendon (1609–1674)	—N/a	1660	1667	First Lord of the Treasury (1660); Chancellor of the Exchequer (1660–1661); Lord Chancellor	1661	Clarendon	Charles II (1660–1685)
Chudleigh Arlington Buckingham Ashley Lauderdale	The C.A.B.A.L.: Thomas Clifford, 1st Baron Clifford of Chudleigh (1630–1673); Henry Bennet, 1st Earl of Arlington (1618–1685); George Villiers, 2nd Duke of Buckingham (1628–1687); Anthony Ashley Cooper, Lord Ashley (1621–1683); John Maitland, 1st Duke of Lauderdale (1621–1683)	—N/a	1667	1674	(See Cabal ministry for details.)	—N/a	Cabal	Charles II (1660–1685)
	Thomas Osborne, 1st Earl of Danby (1632–1712)	Tory	1674	March 1679	Lord High Treasurer	—N/a	Danby I	Charles II (1660–1685)
Temple	The Privy Council chaired by William Temple (1628–1699)	—N/a	April 1679	November 1679	(See Privy Council ministry for details.)	—N/a	Privy Council	Charles II (1660–1685)
Rochester Godolphin Sunderland	Laurence Hyde, 1st Earl of Rochester (1642–1711) & Sidney Godolphin, 1st Earl of Godolphin (1645–1712) & Robert Spencer, 2nd Earl of Sunderland (1641–1702)	Tory	November 1679	1687	(Rochester): First Lord of the Treasury (1679–1684) (Godolphin): First Lord of the Treasury (1684–1685) (Sunderland): Northern Secretary (1679–1680 & 1683–1684) (Godolphin): Northern Secretary (1684) (Sunderland): Southern Secretary (1680–1681 & 1684–1688) (Rochester): Lord High Treasurer (1685–1687)	1681	The Chits	Charles II (1660–1685)
Rochester Godolphin Sunderland	Laurence Hyde, 1st Earl of Rochester (1642–1711) & Sidney Godolphin, 1st Earl of Godolphin (1645–1712) & Robert Spencer, 2nd Earl of Sunderland (1641–1702)	Tory	November 1679	1687	(Rochester): First Lord of the Treasury (1679–1684) (Godolphin): First Lord of the Treasury (1684–1685) (Sunderland): Northern Secretary (1679–1680 & 1683–1684) (Godolphin): Northern Secretary (1684) (Sunderland): Southern Secretary (1680–1681 & 1684–1688) (Rochester): Lord High Treasurer (1685–1687)	1685	The Chits	James II (1685–1688)
Carmarthen Halifax	Thomas Osborne, 1st Marquess of Carmarthen (1632–1712) & George Savile, 1st Marquess of Halifax (1633–1695)	—N/a	1689 (see Convention Parliament (1689))	8 February 1690	(Carmarthen): Lord President of the Council (Halifax): Lord Privy Seal	1689	Carmarthen–Halifax	William III (1689–1702) & Mary II (1689–1694)
	Thomas Osborne, 1st Marquess of Carmarthen (1632–1712)	Tory	February 1690	1695	Lord President of the Council	1690	Carmarthen	William III (1689–1702) & Mary II (1689–1694)
The Whig Junto	The Whig Junto: John Somers, 1st Baron Somers (1651–1716); Charles Montagu (1661–1715) (Note: Lord Montagu became overall leader in 1697, the same year that the last Tory, Godolphin, was removed from office.); Thomas Wharton, 5th Baron Wharton (1648-1715); Edward Russell, 1st Earl of Orford (1653–1727); Henry Sydney, 1st Earl of Romney (1641-1704); Charles Talbot, 1st Duke of Shrewsbury (1660-1718)	Whig	1695	1699	(Somers): Lord Keeper; Lord Chancellor (Montagu): Chancellor of the Exchequer; First Lord of the Treasury (Wharton): Comptroller of the Household (Orford): Lord High Admiral (Romney): Master-General of the Ordnance (Shrewsbury):Northern Secretary; Southern Secretary	1695; 1698	First Whig Junto	William III (1689–1702)
No formal Chief Minister						January 1701; November 1701	Junto Tory	William III (1689–1702)
Godolphin Marlborough	Sidney Godolphin, 1st Earl of Godolphin (1645–1712) & John Churchill, 1st Duke of Marlborough (1650–1722)	Tory	1702	1707	(Godolphin): Lord High Treasurer (Marlborough): Master-General of the Ordnance	1702	Godolphin–Marlborough	Anne (1702–1714)
The Kingdoms of England and Scotland united to form the Kingdom of Great Britain in 1707.								Anne (1702–1714)
Godolphin Marlborough	Sidney Godolphin, 1st Earl of Godolphin (1645–1712) & John Churchill, 1st Duke of Marlborough (1650–1722)	Tory	1707	1710	(Godolphin): Lord High Treasurer (Marlborough): Master-General of the Ordnance	1702	Godolphin–Marlborough	Anne (1702–1714)
Godolphin Marlborough	Sidney Godolphin, 1st Earl of Godolphin (1645–1712) & John Churchill, 1st Duke of Marlborough (1650–1722)	Tory	1707	1710	(Godolphin): Lord High Treasurer (Marlborough): Master-General of the Ordnance	1705	Godolphin–Marlborough	Anne (1702–1714)
Godolphin Marlborough	Sidney Godolphin, 1st Earl of Godolphin (1645–1712) & John Churchill, 1st Duke of Marlborough (1650–1722)	Tory	1707	1710	(Godolphin): Lord High Treasurer (Marlborough): Master-General of the Ordnance	1708	Godolphin–Marlborough	Anne (1702–1714)
	Robert Harley (1661–1724)	Tory (formerly Whig)	1710	30 July 1714	Chancellor of the Exchequer (1710–1711); Lord High Treasurer (1711–1714)	1710	Harley	Anne (1702–1714)
	Robert Harley (1661–1724)	Tory (formerly Whig)	1710	30 July 1714	Chancellor of the Exchequer (1710–1711); Lord High Treasurer (1711–1714)	1713	Harley	Anne (1702–1714)
	Charles Talbot, 1st Duke of Shrewsbury (1660–1718)	Tory	30 July 1714	13 October 1714	Lord High Treasurer	—N/a		Anne (1702–1714)

== Hanoverian Succession ==
In the immediate aftermath of the death of Queen Anne in 1714, the monarchy was unable to function as the new King was in his domains in Hanover and did not know of his accession. As a stopgap, Parliament elected Thomas Parker, 1st Earl of Macclesfield Regent, or "acting king" until the new monarch arrived to take his crown. Later, George, Prince of Wales reigned as regent for six months from July 1716 to January 1717 when the King went to Hanover.

In the early part of the reign of George I, who could not speak English, the cabinet began meeting without the monarch present.

Following the succession of George I and the resignation of the Duke of Shrewsbury in 1714, the office of Lord High Treasurer went into permanent commission, its function undertaken by a commission of Lords of the Treasury, chaired by the First Lord of the Treasury, rather than by an individual Lord High Treasurer. From 1714 to 1717 the ministry was led by Viscount Townshend, who was nominally Northern Secretary; the Earl of Halifax, the Earl of Carlisle and Robert Walpole successively served alongside Townshend as nominal First Lord of the Treasury. From 1717 to 1721 Lords Stanhope (First Lord 1717–1718) and Sunderland (First Lord 1718–1721) led the administration jointly, with Stanhope managing foreign affairs and Sunderland managing home affairs. Stanhope died in February 1721 and Sunderland resigned in April 1721; Townshend and Walpole returned to office.

As a consequence of Lord High Treasurers and subsequently First Lords of the Treasury being the dominant figure across many ministries, the position soon became synonymous with government leadership, allowing the position of First Lord of the Treasury to become a prototype for the office of Prime Minister of the United Kingdom and its dominions.

=== George I ===
Minister(s) (Lifespan)		Party	Term of office		Ministerial offices	Election	Ministry
	Charles Townshend, 2nd Viscount Townshend (1674–1738)	Whig	13 October 1714	1716	Northern Secretary	1715	Townshend
Stanhope Sunderland	James Stanhope, 1st Viscount Stanhope (c. 1673–1721) & Charles Spencer, 3rd Earl of Sunderland (1675–1722)	Whig	12 April 1717	21 March 1718	(Stanhope): First Lord of the Treasury; Chancellor of the Exchequer (Sunderland): Northern Secretary	—N/a	Stanhope–Sunderland I
Stanhope Sunderland	James Stanhope, 1st Viscount Stanhope (c. 1673–1721) & Charles Spencer, 3rd Earl of Sunderland (1675–1722)	Whig	21 March 1718	4 April 1721	(Sunderland): First Lord of the Treasury (Stanhope): Northern Secretary	—N/a	Stanhope–Sunderland II

== See also ==
- Chief minister of France
- Timeline of chief ministers and prime ministers of England, Great Britain and the United Kingdom
