= Ministry of the Chits =

Government of England

- 1679-1688
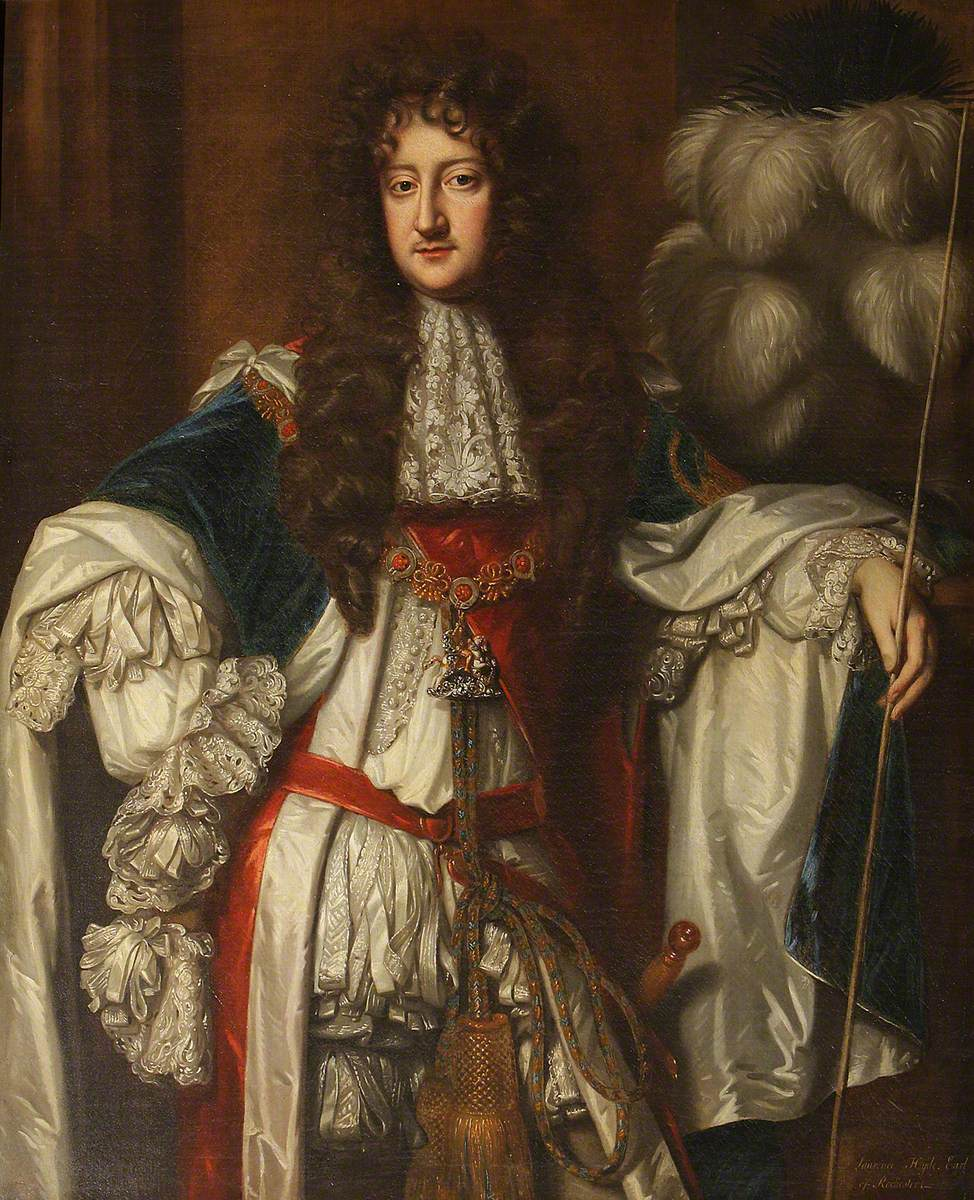
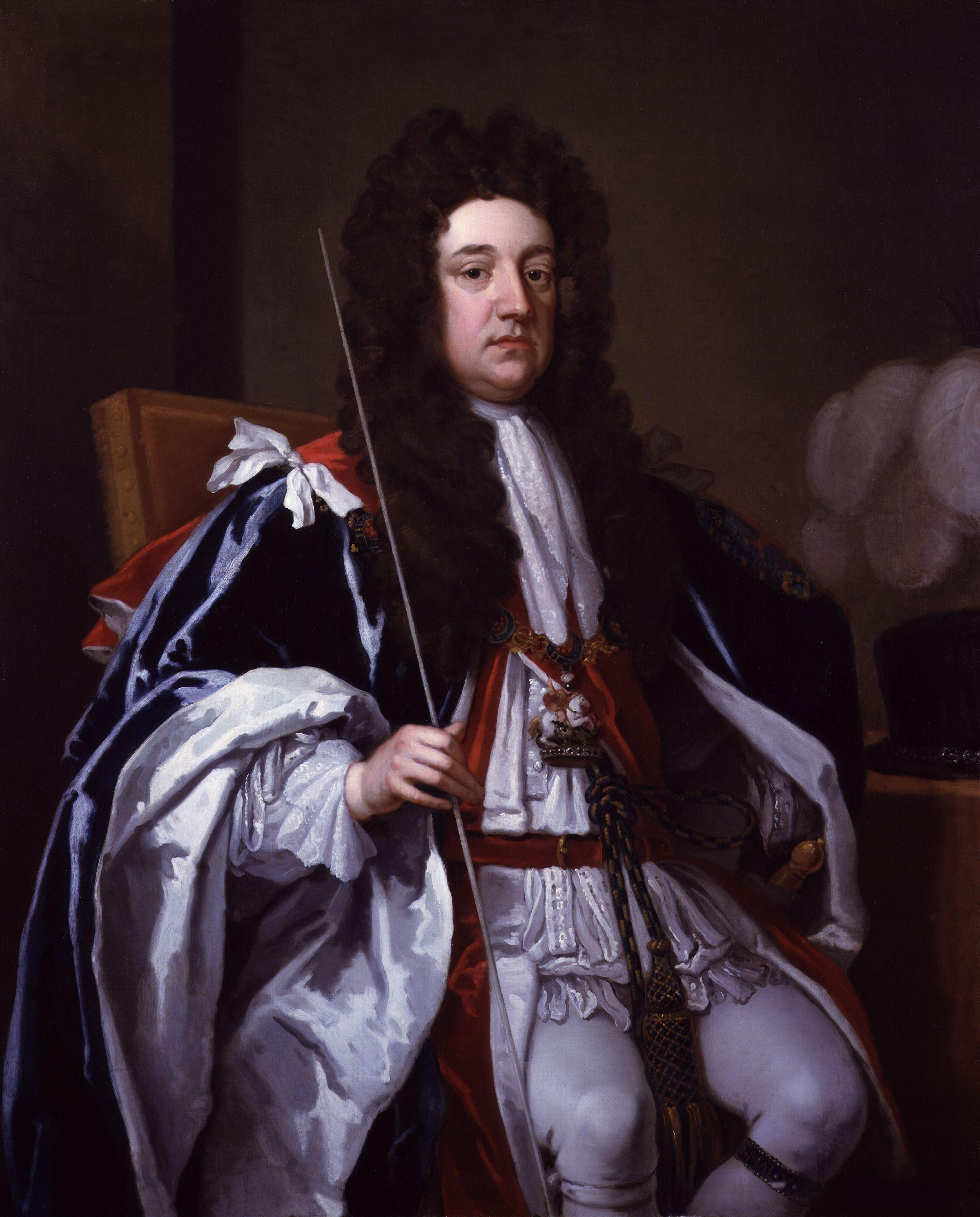
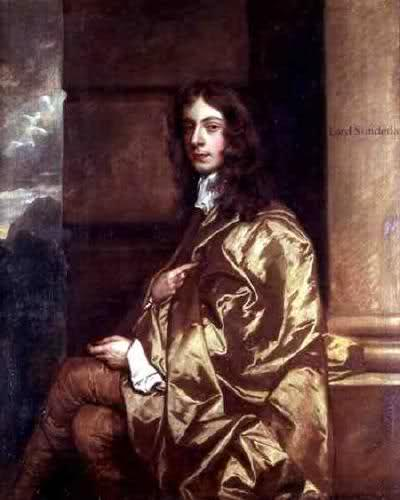
- Hyde (left), Godolphin (center), and Sunderland (right).
- Date formed: 1679; 347 years ago
- Date dissolved: 1688; 338 years ago

People and organisations
- Monarch: Charles II; James II
- First Lord of the Treasury: Laurence Hyde, 1st Earl of Rochester
- Treasury Commissioner: Sidney Godolphin
- Northern Secretary Southern Secretary: Robert Spencer, 2nd Earl of Sunderland
- Member party: Tory
- Status in legislature: Majority government
- Opposition cabinet: None

History
- Elections: 1681; 1685
- Legislature terms: 5th Parliament of Charles II; 1st Parliament of James II
- Predecessor: Privy Council ministry
- Successor: Carmarthen–Halifax ministry

The Ministry of the Chits was the government of the Kingdom of England from November 1679 to 1688. The administration was led by three young ministers, collectively known as the chits: Laurence Hyde (Earl of Rochester, 1682), Sidney Godolphin (Lord Godolphin, 1684) and the Robert Spencer, 2nd Earl of Sunderland.

Rochester, brother-in-law of King Charles II's brother James, Duke of York, served as First Lord of the Treasury until "kicked upstairs" (term coined by Lord Halifax) as Lord President of the Council in September 1684. On the Duke of York's succession as King James II in February 1685, Rochester returned as Lord High Treasurer. He was troubled by the King's Catholicism and disputed religious matters with him. On 4 January 1687 James II dismissed Rochester and his brother the Earl of Clarendon, replacing both with Catholic appointees, Lord Belasyse (aged 72) and Lord Arundell (aged 79).

Sunderland, who served variously as Northern Secretary and Southern Secretary, and additionally as Lord President of the Council from 1685, remained in post until his dismissal by James II in October 1688, when he fled to Rotterdam.

Godolphin, First Lord of the Treasury 1684–85, was retained at the Treasury by William III, returning as First Lord in the Carmarthen Ministry of 1690.

== The Chits ==
The moniker "the chits" stems from a satirical verse on the three ministers, attributed to John Dryden by Johnson's Dictionary:

But Sunderland, Godolphin, Lory,
These will appear such chits in story,
'Twill turn all politics to jests,
To be repeated like John Dory,
While fiddlers sing at feasts.

== The Ministry ==
=== November 1679 to September 1684 ===
OFFICE	NAME	TERM
First Lord of the Treasury	Laurence Hyde, 1st Earl of Rochester	1679–1684
Treasury Commissioner; Northern Secretary	Sidney Godolphin	1679–1684; 1684
Northern Secretary; Southern Secretary; Northern Secretary	Robert Spencer, 2nd Earl of Sunderland	1679–1680; 1680–1681; 1683–1684
Lord Chancellor; Lord Keeper	Heneage Finch, 1st Earl of Nottingham	1679–1682
Lord Chancellor; Lord Keeper	Francis North, 1st Baron Guilford	1682–1684
Lord President of the Council	John Robartes, 1st Earl of Radnor	1679–1684
Lord Privy Seal	Arthur Annesley, 1st Earl of Anglesey	1679–1682
Lord Privy Seal	George Savile, 1st Marquess of Halifax	1682–1684
Lord Steward	James Butler, 1st Duke of Ormonde	1679–1684
Lord Chamberlain	Henry Bennet, 1st Earl of Arlington	1679–1684
Southern Secretary	Henry Coventry	1679–1680
Southern Secretary	Robert Spencer, 2nd Earl of Sunderland	1680–1681
Southern Secretary	Sir Leoline Jenkins	1681–1684
Northern Secretary	Robert Spencer, 2nd Earl of Sunderland	1679–1680
Northern Secretary	Sir Leoline Jenkins	1680–1681
Northern Secretary	Edward Conway, 1st Earl of Conway	1681–1683
Northern Secretary	Robert Spencer, 2nd Earl of Sunderland	1683–1684
Northern Secretary	Sidney Godolphin	1684
Chancellor of the Exchequer	Sir John Ernle	1679–1684
First Lord of the Admiralty	Sir Henry Capell	1679–1681
First Lord of the Admiralty	Daniel Finch, 2nd Earl of Nottingham	1681–1684

- Lord Nottingham was Lord Chancellor until 1682, when Lord Guilford assumed the same position; however, the latter had not yet acceded to the peerage, and was therefore forced to assume the position of Lord Keeper. For all intents and purposes, these positions are identical, and have been formatted as such.
- Additionally, there were two Earls of Nottingham: the elder Nottingham served as Lord Chancellor, and his successor to the earldom served as First Lord of the Admiralty.

=== September 1684 to February 1685 ===
OFFICE	NAME	TERM
First Lord of the Treasury	Sidney Godolphin, 1st Baron Godolphin	1684–1685
Southern Secretary	Robert Spencer, 2nd Earl of Sunderland	1684–1685
Lord President of the Council	Laurence Hyde, 1st Earl of Rochester	1684–1685
Lord Keeper	Francis North, 1st Baron Guilford	1684–1685
Lord Privy Seal	George Savile, 1st Marquess of Halifax	1684–1685
Lord Steward	James Butler, 1st Duke of Ormonde	1684–1685
Lord Chamberlain	Henry Bennet, 1st Earl of Arlington	1684–1685
Northern Secretary	Charles Middleton, 2nd Earl of Middleton	1684–1685
Chancellor of the Exchequer	Sir John Ernle	1684–1685

=== February 1685 to October 1688 ===
OFFICE	NAME	TERM	How left office
Lord High Treasurer; First Lord of the Treasury	Laurence Hyde, 1st Earl of Rochester	1685–1687
Lord High Treasurer; First Lord of the Treasury	John Belasyse, 1st Baron Belasyse	1687–1689
Chamberlain to the Queen; Treasury Commissioner	Sidney Godolphin, 1st Baron Godolphin	1685–1687; 1687–1689	"He adhered to James till the last; he was one of the council of five [the others were Belasyse, Preston, Jeffreys and Arundell] appointed to remain in London when James advanced to Salisbury [on 17 November], and he was sent with Halifax and Nottingham to treat with the Prince of Orange at Hungerford in December."
Lord President of the Council and Southern Secretary; Lord President of the Council and Northern Secretary	Robert Spencer, 2nd Earl of Sunderland	1685–1688	Dismissed 27 October 1688.
Lord President of the Council and Southern Secretary; Lord President of the Council and Northern Secretary	Richard Graham, 1st Viscount Preston	October 1688
Lord Chancellor	George Jeffreys, 1st Baron Jeffreys	1685–1688	Surrendered the great seal to the king, 8 December 1688
Lord Privy Seal	Henry Hyde, 2nd Earl of Clarendon	1685–1687
Lord Privy Seal	Henry Arundell, 3rd Baron Arundell of Wardour	1687–1688	"On the abdication of James, Arundell retired to his house at Breamore, Hampshire, and took no further part in public life."
Lord Steward	James Butler, 1st Duke of Ormonde	1685–1688	Died 21 July 1688
Lord Chamberlain	Robert Bruce, 1st Earl of Ailesbury	July 1685 – October 1685	Died 20 October 1685
Lord Chamberlain	John Sheffield, 3rd Earl of Mulgrave	1685–1689	"Upon William's landing in England Mulgrave remained with James in London until the time of his flight. When the news of his capture in Kent [on 11 December] reached London, Halifax wished to adjourn the council of lords, who carried on a provisional government, in order to avoid the responsibility of action. But Mulgrave, begging them to keep their seats, introduced the king's messenger, and prevailed on them to send Lord Feversham to the assistance of James (Mulgrave, Account of the Revolution). He came to the aid also of the Spanish ambassador when the mob demolished his house, inviting him to Whitehall and paying him marked honour. For this conduct, which avoided friction with the Spanish court, he received the thanks of both James and William. On the establishment of the revolutionary government Mulgrave quietly submitted and voted for associating William with Mary on the throne."
Northern Secretary	Charles Middleton, 2nd Earl of Middleton	1685–October 1688	Transferred to Southern Department Oct. 1688
Southern Secretary	Charles Middleton, 2nd Earl of Middleton	October 1688	"[H]e justified the confidence reposed in him by remaining faithful to James to the last. After the king's sudden withdrawal to Faversham [on the night of 10/11 December] he declined to attend the meeting of the lords and privy council called to consider the steps to be taken in the crisis (Clarke, Life of James II, ii. 259). Nevertheless he was one of the four nobles deputed by them to invite the king to return to Whitehall, and was present with him at Whitehall when a message came from the Prince of Orange that James should retire from London. At the king's request he arranged for his withdrawal to Rochester [on 18 December]. Subsequently he waited on the king there to surrender the seals of the secretary's office, and endeavoured to induce him to abandon his projected flight and to summon a parliament. It was to him that the king, after making his secret escape, left the paper containing his reasons for ‘withdrawing himself from England.’ "
Chancellor of the Exchequer	Sir John Ernle	1685–1688

Preceded by Privy Council ministry	Government of England; 1679–1688	Succeeded by Carmarthen–Halifax ministry
