= First Whig Junto =

Seventeenth-century English government cabal

- 1694-1699
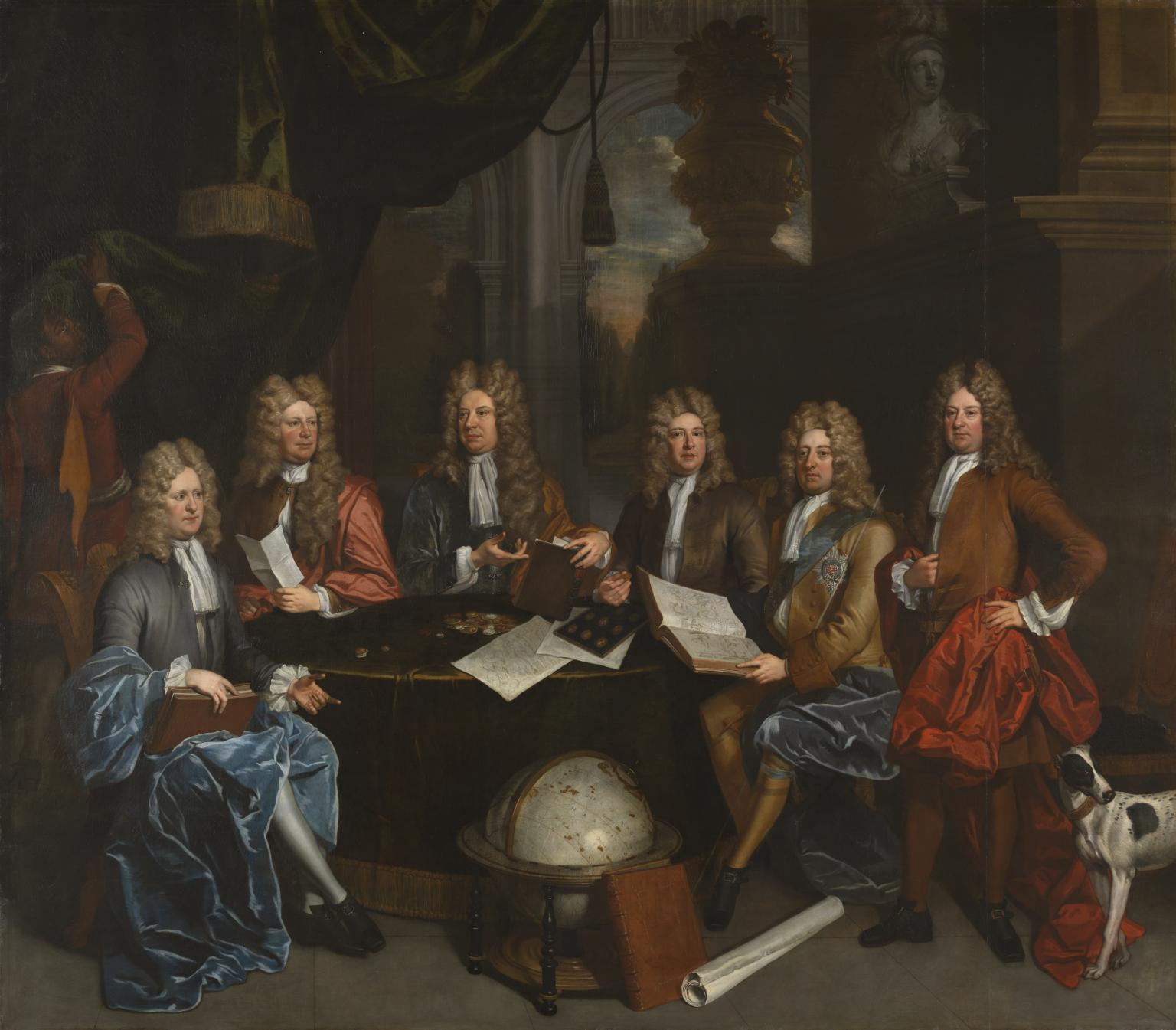
- Painting of the Junto, 1710
- Date formed: 1694
- Date dissolved: 1699

People and organisations
- Monarch: William III
- Chancellor of the Exchequer: Sir Charles Montagu
- Member party: Whig
- Status in legislature: Majority / Minority government
- Opposition cabinet: None

History
- Elections: 1695; 1698
- Legislature term: 3rd Parliament of William III
- Predecessor: Carmarthen ministry
- Successor: Junto Tory ministry

The First Whig Junto controlled the government of England from 1694 to 1699 and was the first part of the Whig Junto, a group of Whig MPs who controlled the most important political decisions. (Note: Compare junta which has fallen into use only for military junta) The Junto was reappointed twice following the elections of 1695 and 1698.

== History ==
The Whig elite rose to government ascendancy while Lord Danby held office through three shortly-spaced changes of monarch (dating back to the royal-dominated ministries of Charles II). The Junto established its dominance in 1694, with the appointment of Sir Charles Montagu as Chancellor of the Exchequer on 10 May. Danby, who had been created Duke of Leeds on 4 May, remained in office, but under a diminished role. While he was still Lord President of the Council, the Junto controlled the government of England from 1694 to 1699.

It was led by six prominent members: Montagu (Note: Lord Montagu became overall leader in 1697, the same year that the last Tory, Godolphin, was removed from office), John Somers, Wharton, Romney, Orford, and Shrewsbury. Supporting these peers were two unofficial whips in the House of Lords: the earls of Sunderland and Portland. Only the earl of Sunderland also held an office at the time, albeit a less senior one, as Lord Chamberlain. The Whig Party held a majority in the House of Commons after the election in 1695, although not all Whig MPs were unswervingly loyal to the Junto.

The Junto oversaw the creation of the Bank of England in 1694, but by 1699 the Junto's power had declined in the face of opposition by Robert Harley and the Tories. Many members of the Junto would return to government from 1706 to 1710 as part of the Godolphin-Marlborough ministry.

== Ministry ==
The government was led by the six most prominent members of the Junto.

Office	Name	Term
Chancellor of the Exchequer	Sir Charles Montagu	1694–1699
First Lord of the Treasury	Sir Charles Montagu	1697–1699
Lord Keeper	John Somers, 1st Baron Somers	1694–1697
Lord Chancellor	John Somers, 1st Baron Somers	1697–1699
Comptroller of the Household	Thomas Wharton, 5th Baron Wharton	1694–1699
Master-General of the Ordnance	Henry Sydney, 1st Earl of Romney	1694–1699
Lord High Admiral	Edward Russell, 1st Earl of Orford	1694–1699
Northern Secretary	Charles Talbot, 1st Duke of Shrewsbury	1694–1695
Southern Secretary	Charles Talbot, 1st Duke of Shrewsbury	1695–1698

Other members of the ministry had less power.

Office	Name	Term
Archbishop of Canterbury	Thomas Tenison	1694–1699
First Lord of the Treasury	Sidney Godolphin, 1st Baron Godolphin (Tory)	1694–1697
Lord President of the Council	Thomas Osborne, 1st Duke of Leeds	1694–1699
Lord Privy Seal	Thomas Herbert, 8th Earl of Pembroke	1694–1699
Lord Steward	William Cavendish, 1st Duke of Devonshire	1694–1699
Lord Chamberlain	Robert Spencer, 2nd Earl of Sunderland	1695–1699
Southern Secretary	Sir John Trenchard	1694–1695
Southern Secretary	James Vernon	1698–1699
Northern Secretary	Sir William Trumbull	1695–1697
Northern Secretary	James Vernon	1697–1699

James Vernon was appointed Secretary of State in 1697, with responsibility for the Northern Department. The following year, after the Duke of Shrewsbury left the government, he took responsibility for the Southern Department as well.

== Notes ==
Preceded by Carmarthen ministry	Government of England; 1694–1699	Succeeded by Junto Tory ministry
