= First Danby ministry =

Government of England

- 1674-1679
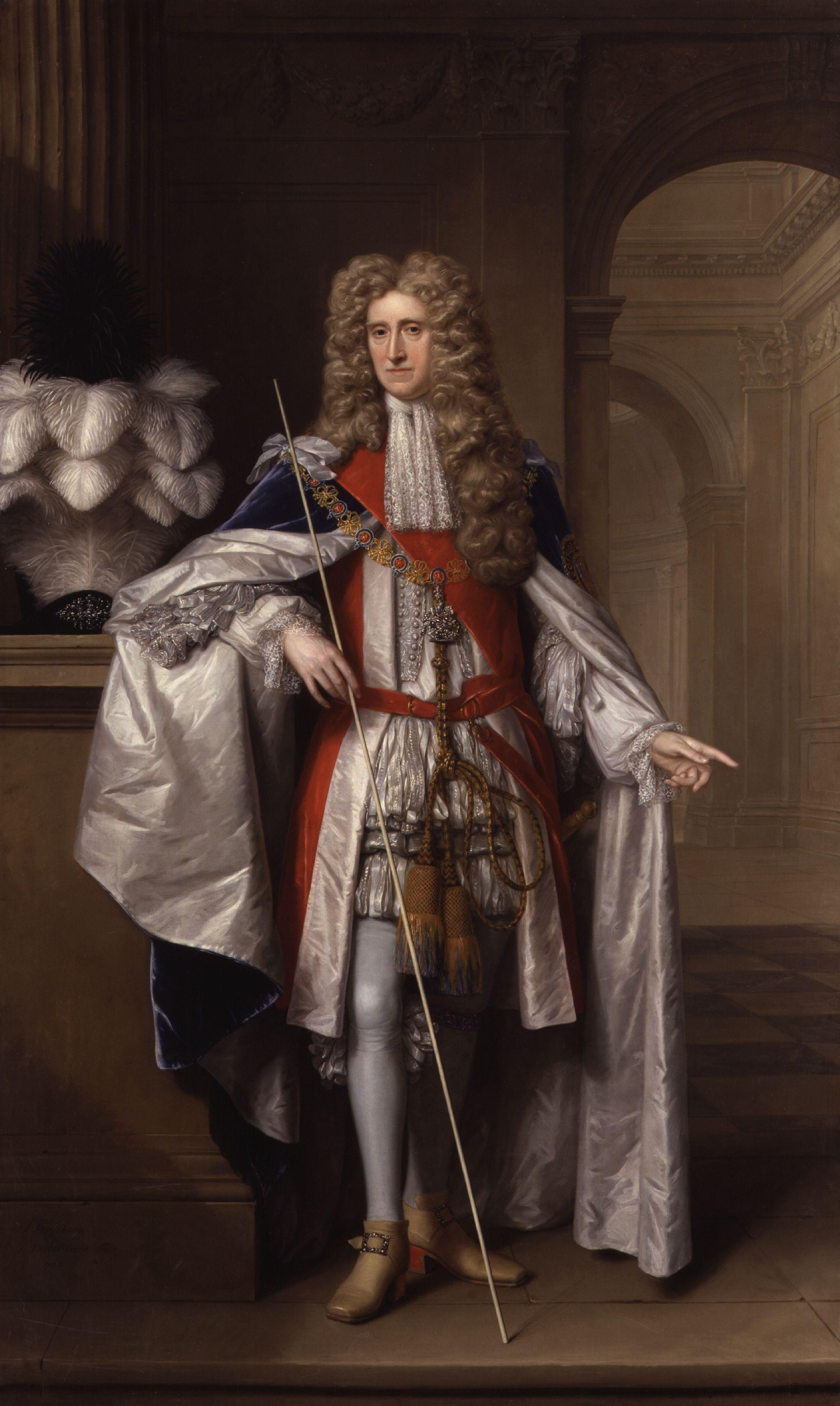
- Portrait of Danby, 1704
- Date formed: 1674; 352 years ago
- Date dissolved: 1679; 347 years ago

People and organisations
- Monarch: Charles II
- Lord High Treasurer: Thomas Osborne, 1st Earl of Danby
- Member party: Cavalier
- Status in legislature: Majority government
- Opposition cabinet: None

History
- Election: None
- Legislature term: 2nd Parliament of Charles II
- Predecessor: Cabal ministry
- Successor: Privy Council ministry

The first Danby ministry was the name of the governmental body led by the Thomas Osborne, 1st Earl of Danby during the reign of Charles II. It was the successor of the Cabal ministry which fell from power when the Catholicism of some members became a problem for parliament. As a consequence of this issue, the Danby ministry was traditionally associated with an Anglican policy in the Church of England and a pro-Dutch foreign policy.

== Membership ==
Shown here is a table showing the main membership of the Danby Ministry for its duration.

| Office | Name | Term |
|---|---|---|
| Lord High Treasurer | Thomas Osborne, 1st Earl of Danby | 1674–1679 |
| Lord Keeper | Heneage Finch, 1st Baron Finch | 1674–1675 |
| Lord Chancellor | Heneage Finch, 1st Baron Finch | 1675–1679 |
| Lord Privy Seal | Arthur Annesley, 1st Earl of Anglesey | 1674–1679 |
| Lord High Admiral | Prince Rupert of the Rhine | 1674–1679 |
| Lord Steward | James Butler, 1st Duke of Ormonde | 1674–1679 |
| Lord Chamberlain | Henry Jermyn, 1st Earl of St Albans | 1674 |
| Lord Chamberlain | Henry Bennet, 1st Earl of Arlington | 1674–1679 |
| Master of the Horse | George Villiers, 2nd Duke of Buckingham | 1674 |
| Southern Secretary | Henry Coventry | 1674–1679 |
| Northern Secretary | Sir Joseph Williamson | 1674–1679 |
| Secretary of State for Scotland | John Maitland, 1st Duke of Lauderdale | 1674–1679 |
| Chancellor of the Exchequer | Sir John Duncombe | 1674–1676 |
| Chancellor of the Exchequer | Sir John Ernle | 1676–1679 |
| Treasurer of the Navy | Edward Seymour | 1674–1679 |

| Preceded by Cabal ministry | Government of England; 1674–1679 | Succeeded by Privy Council ministry |
