= Privy Council ministry =

Government of England

- April – November 1679
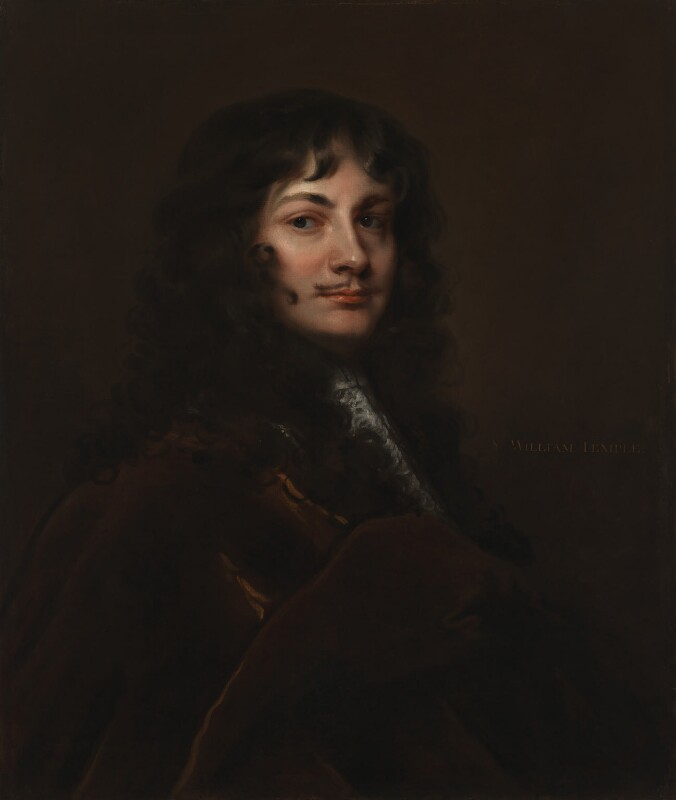
- Portrait of Sir William Temple, 1660
- Date formed: April 1679; 347 years ago
- Date dissolved: November 1679; 346 years ago

People and organisations
- Monarch: Charles II
- Chief Minister: Sir William Temple
- Member party: Privy Council
- Status in legislature: Caretaker government
- Opposition cabinet: None

History
- Elections: March 1679; October 1679
- Legislature terms: 3rd Parliament of Charles II; 4th Parliament of Charles II
- Predecessor: First Danby ministry
- Successor: Ministry of the Chits

The Privy Council ministry was a short-lived reorganisation of English government to place the ministry under the control of the Privy Council in April 1679, due to events in that time.

Since the Stuart Restoration of 1660, Charles II of England had been involved in a political conflict with the Parliament of England. In 1679, the career diplomat Sir William Temple first became Charles' closest advisor and was then instructed to form a new ministry, replacing Thomas Osborne, Earl of Danby as the head of government. Temple's goal was to reconcile the rival political factions of the era.

A reorganised version of the council, reduced to only 30 members, would control all government positions. Fifteen members were high-ranking government officials, clerics, and judges, while the other fifteen were among the wealthiest members of the parliamentary factions. Charles II's illegitimate son James Scott, 1st Duke of Monmouth was included in the new government because he was popular with the public. But the rival politicians in the council failed to co-operate with each other, and Temple himself did not exercise any actual authority over the other ministers. After the ministry collapsed, Laurence Hyde became the new chief minister.

== Formation ==
The event followed years of widespread discontent with the government, which had been consistently autocratic and clandestine since the Restoration and was now mired in conflict between Parliament and King Charles. Sir William Temple, England's foremost diplomat and greatly respected both at home and abroad, was recalled at the beginning of 1679 and became the king's closest advisor. Elections to the House of Commons returned a majority for the opponents of the government; the Earl of Danby was forced from office, and Temple led the formation of a new ministry, aiming to reconcile the conflicting factions.

Temple believed the king should not exercise absolute power, but he was also uncomfortable with the increasing prominence of Parliament. He sought to create a less divisive body that could carry popular support without trying to dictate to the king. He proposed that the king should no longer be advised by any one individual or by a select committee of the Privy Council, but by a reformed council as a whole. The new council would have thirty members, rather than fifty: Fifteen would hold paid high office in government, the Church or the judiciary; fifteen would be independent, representing the parliamentary factions and chosen for their wealth (which Temple felt was the source of power). The king would give full consideration to the opinions of the council, which would be free to discuss and vote on all matters. The king duly dismissed the existing council; news of this, and that the new government would include members of the country party and the king's popular, illegitimate son, Monmouth, was widely welcomed. However, Charles took against the scheme when Temple insisted on the inclusion of Viscount Halifax, whom he disliked personally. He agreed but insisted, to Temple's alarm, that the Earl of Shaftesbury, the government's most vociferous critic, should also be included. This sabotaged Temple's council, ensuring irreconcilable division.

== First meeting of the council, and its collapse ==
The new council met on 21 April. Within hours, it had been subverted, as a group of nine conflicting members took a lead in the conduct of business. Temple reacted angrily, almost leaving the council, then consenting to form a group of four (with Halifax, Essex and Sunderland) to advise the king in secret. The four worked well together, but the full council was sharply divided. Shaftesbury now effectively led the opposition from within the government itself, with the support of a majority in the Commons. In the face of the Exclusion Bill, the king prorogued and then dissolved Parliament without the council's approval. Temple withdrew from active participation, leaving Halifax, Essex and Sunderland to exercise power as a triumvirate, and a thirty-first councillor was appointed. When the king fell ill and his brother's return from the Dutch Republic caused alarm in the country, Temple expressed his concerns to the triumvirate but was no longer taken seriously. Elections for the new Parliament returned another opposition majority, and the king prorogued it before it met, again in spite of the council. Shaftesbury was discharged from office, and other leading critics of the government resigned. Temple's experiment ended with the rise of Laurence Hyde, a strong supporter of the king, in November.

== The ministry ==
Office	Name	Term
None	Sir William Temple	Throughout
First Lord of the Treasury Commission	Arthur Capell, 1st Earl of Essex	Throughout
Northern Secretary	Robert Spencer, 2nd Earl of Sunderland	Throughout
None	George Savile, 1st Viscount Halifax	Throughout
Lord Chancellor	Heneage Finch, 1st Baron Finch	Throughout
Lord President	Anthony Ashley-Cooper, 1st Earl of Shaftesbury	To October
Lord President	John Robartes, 2nd Baron Robartes	From October
Lord Privy Seal	Arthur Annesley, 1st Earl of Anglesey	Throughout
Lord Chamberlain	Henry Bennet, 1st Earl of Arlington	Throughout
Southern Secretary	Henry Coventry	Throughout
Secretary of State for Scotland	John Maitland, 1st Duke of Lauderdale	Throughout
Chancellor of the Exchequer	Sir John Ernle	Throughout
Master-General of the Ordnance	Sir Thomas Chicheley	Throughout
First Lord of the Admiralty	Sir Henry Capell	Throughout
Chief-Justice of the Common Pleas	Sir Francis North	Throughout
Lord President of Wales	Henry Somerset, 3rd Marquess of Worcester	Throughout
Archbishop of Canterbury	William Sancroft	Throughout
Bishop of London	Henry Compton	Throughout
None	Sir Edward Seymour, 4th Baronet	Throughout
None	Henry Powle	Throughout
None	John Robartes, 2nd Baron Robartes	To October
None	William Russell, Lord Russell	Throughout
None	William Cavendish, Baron Cavendish of Hardwick	Throughout
None	John Granville, 1st Earl of Bath	Throughout
None	James Cecil, 3rd Earl of Salisbury	Throughout
None	John Egerton, 2nd Earl of Bridgwater	Throughout
None	Christopher Monck, 2nd Duke of Albemarle	Throughout
None	James Scott, 1st Duke of Monmouth	Throughout
None	Charles Paulet, 6th Marquess of Winchester	Throughout
None	Thomas Belasyse, 1st Earl Fauconberg	Throughout
None	Henry Cavendish, 2nd Duke of Newcastle	Throughout
None	Denzil Holles, 1st Baron Holles	From June

=== Ministers not in the Privy Council ===
Office	Name	Term
Paymaster of the Forces	Sir Stephen Fox	Throughout

Preceded by First Danby ministry	Government of England; 1679	Succeeded by Ministry of the Chits
