= Carmarthen–Halifax ministry =

Government of England

- 1689-1690
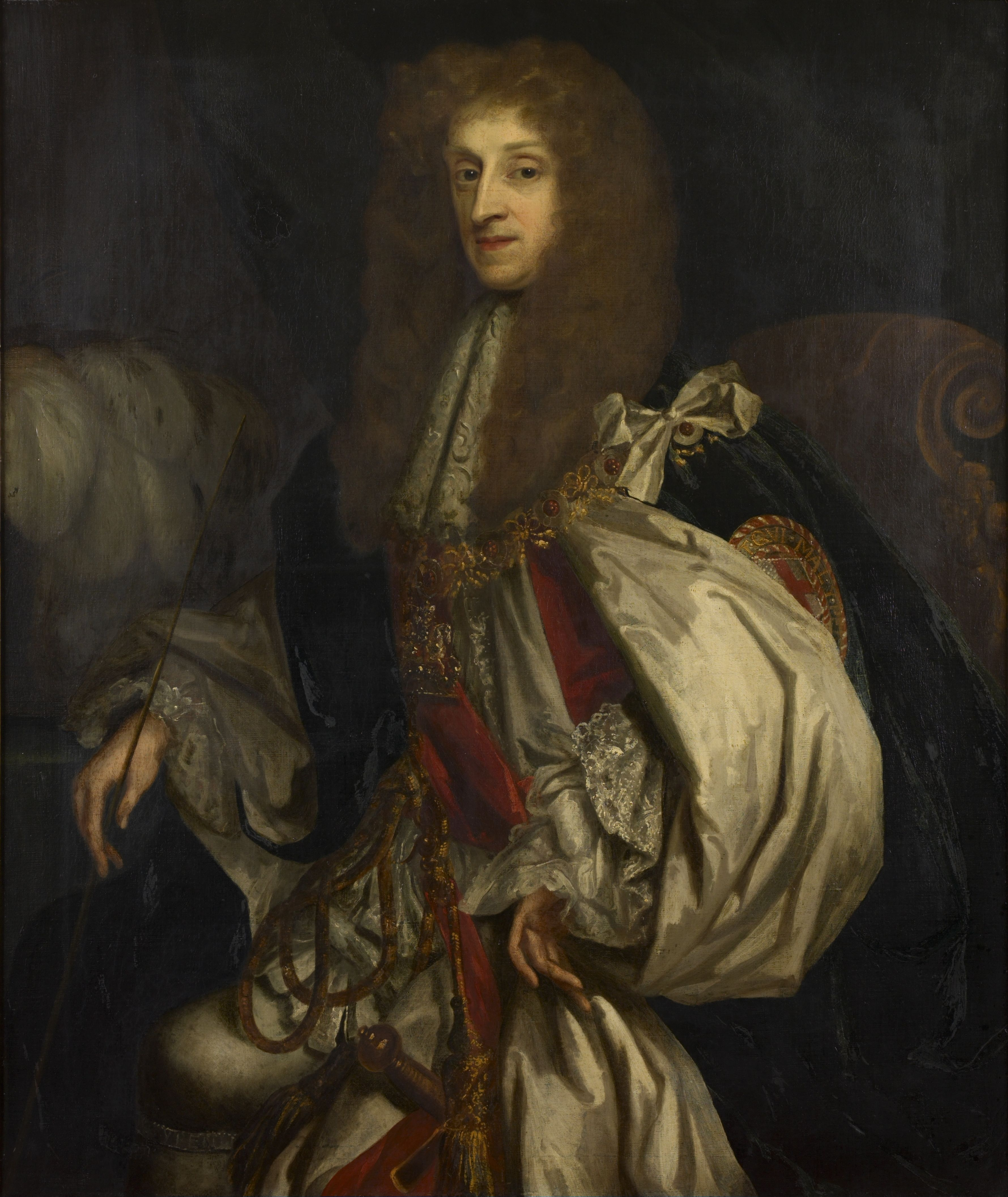
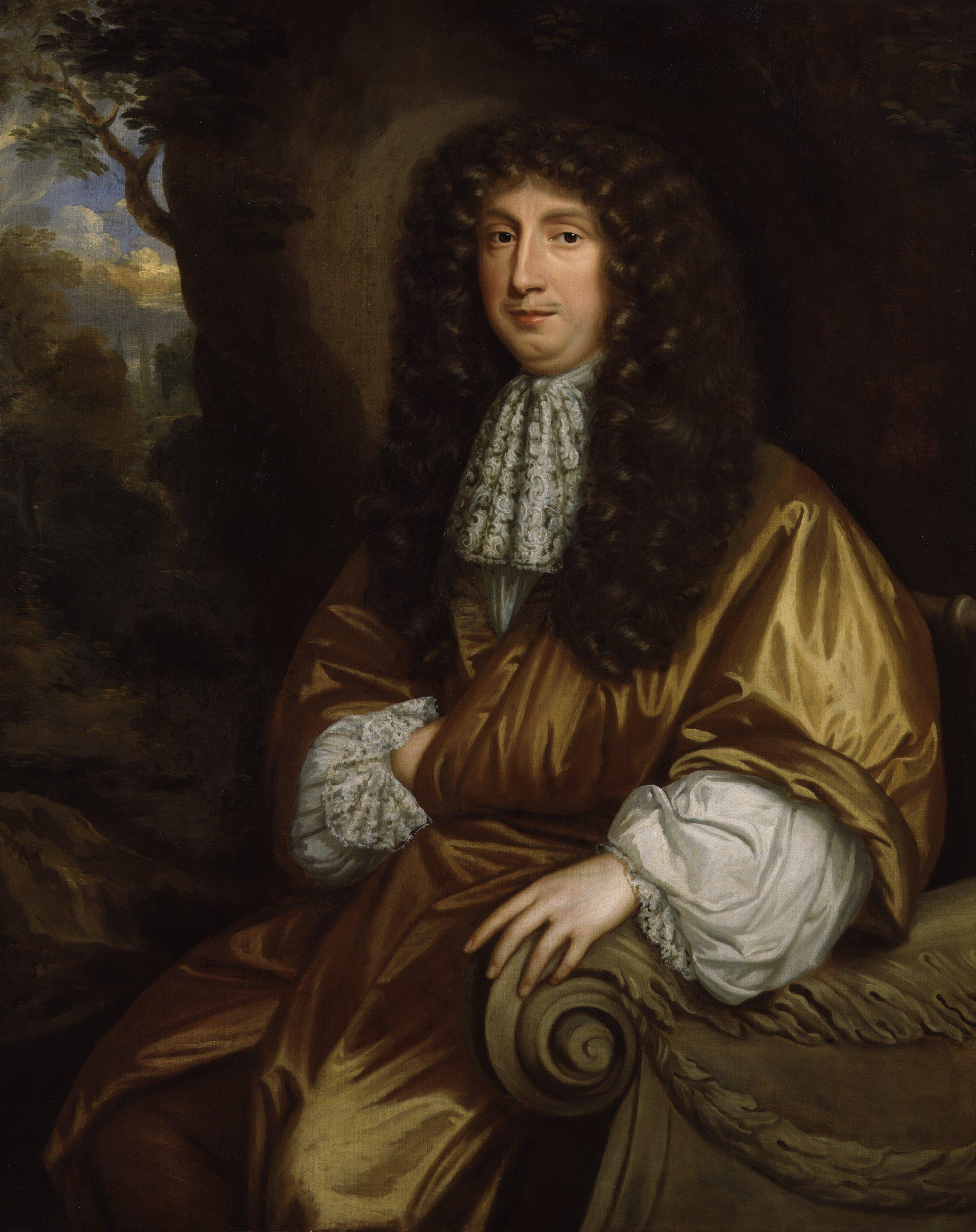
- Carmarthen (left), and Halifax (right)
- Date formed: 1689; 337 years ago
- Date dissolved: 1690; 336 years ago

People and organisations
- Monarch: William III and Mary II
- Lord President of the Council: Thomas Osborne, 1st Marquess of Carmarthen
- Lord Privy Seal: George Savile, 1st Marquess of Halifax
- Member party: Whig-Tory Coalition
- Status in legislature: Majority government
- Opposition cabinet: None

History
- Election: 1689
- Legislature term: 1st Parliament of William III and Mary II
- Predecessor: Ministry of the Chits
- Successor: Carmarthen ministry

The first ministry of William III and Mary II involved a precarious and short lived balance between erstwhile opponents George Savile, 1st Marquess of Halifax and Thomas Osborne, 1st Marquess of Carmarthen, as William attempted to balance the Whigs to whom he owed his initial success with the Tories needed to maintain his position.

It was a very unsure period as no one knew if James would come back, or if the people would accept a new king. Ultimately, the ministry collapsed under the weight of attack from Whigs against Halifax, who voluntarily withdrew. Carmarthen remained in power.

== The Ministry ==
OFFICE	NAME	TERM
First Lord of the Treasury	Charles Mordaunt, 1st Earl of Monmouth	1689–1690
Lord Keeper	In Commission	1689–1690
Lord President of the Council	Thomas Osborne, 1st Marquess of Carmarthen	1689–1690
Lord Privy Seal	George Savile, 1st Marquess of Halifax	1689–1690
Lord Steward	William Cavendish, 1st Duke of Devonshire	1689–1690
Lord Chamberlain	Charles Sackville, 6th Earl of Dorset	1689–1690
Master of the Horse	Henry Nassau	1689–1690
Southern Secretary	Charles Talbot, 12th Earl of Shrewsbury	1689–1690
Northern Secretary	Daniel Finch, 2nd Earl of Nottingham	1689–1690
Chancellor of the Exchequer	Henry Booth, 2nd Baron Delamere	1689–1690

Preceded by Ministry of the Chits	Government of England; 1689–1690	Succeeded by Carmarthen ministry
