= Junto Tory ministry =

- 1699-1702
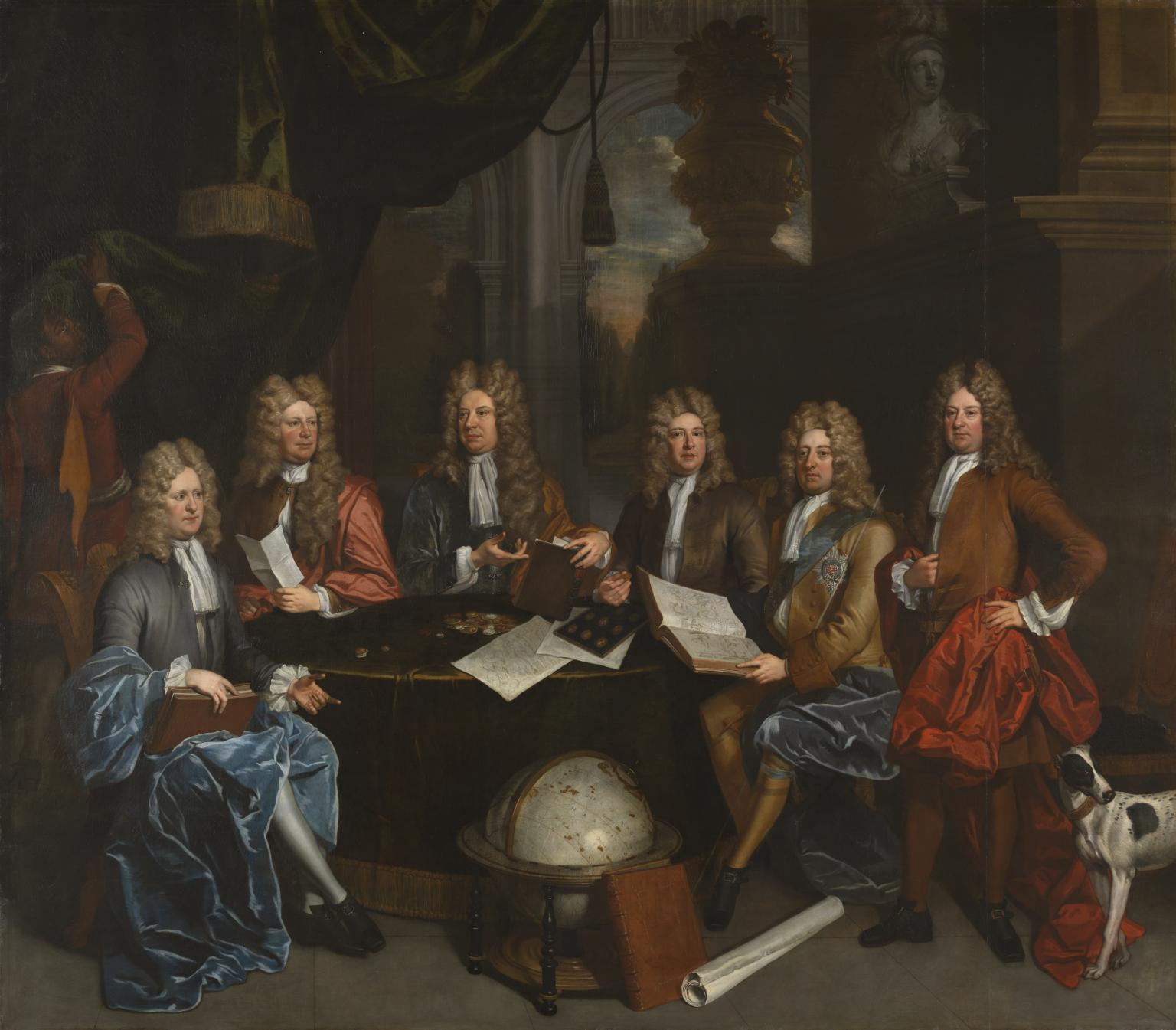
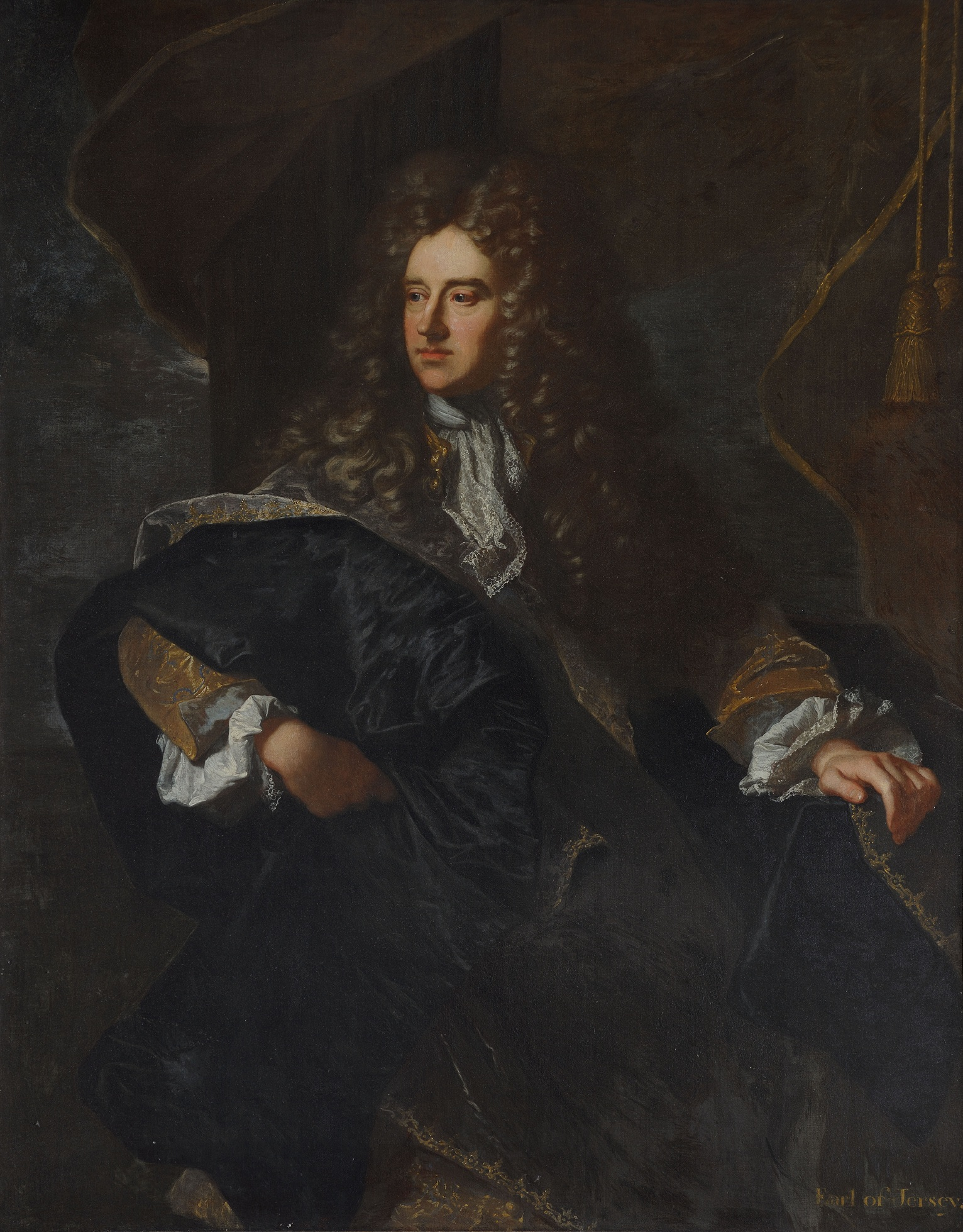
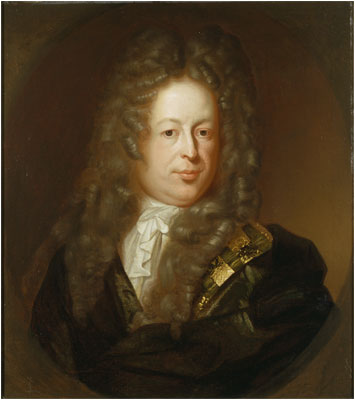
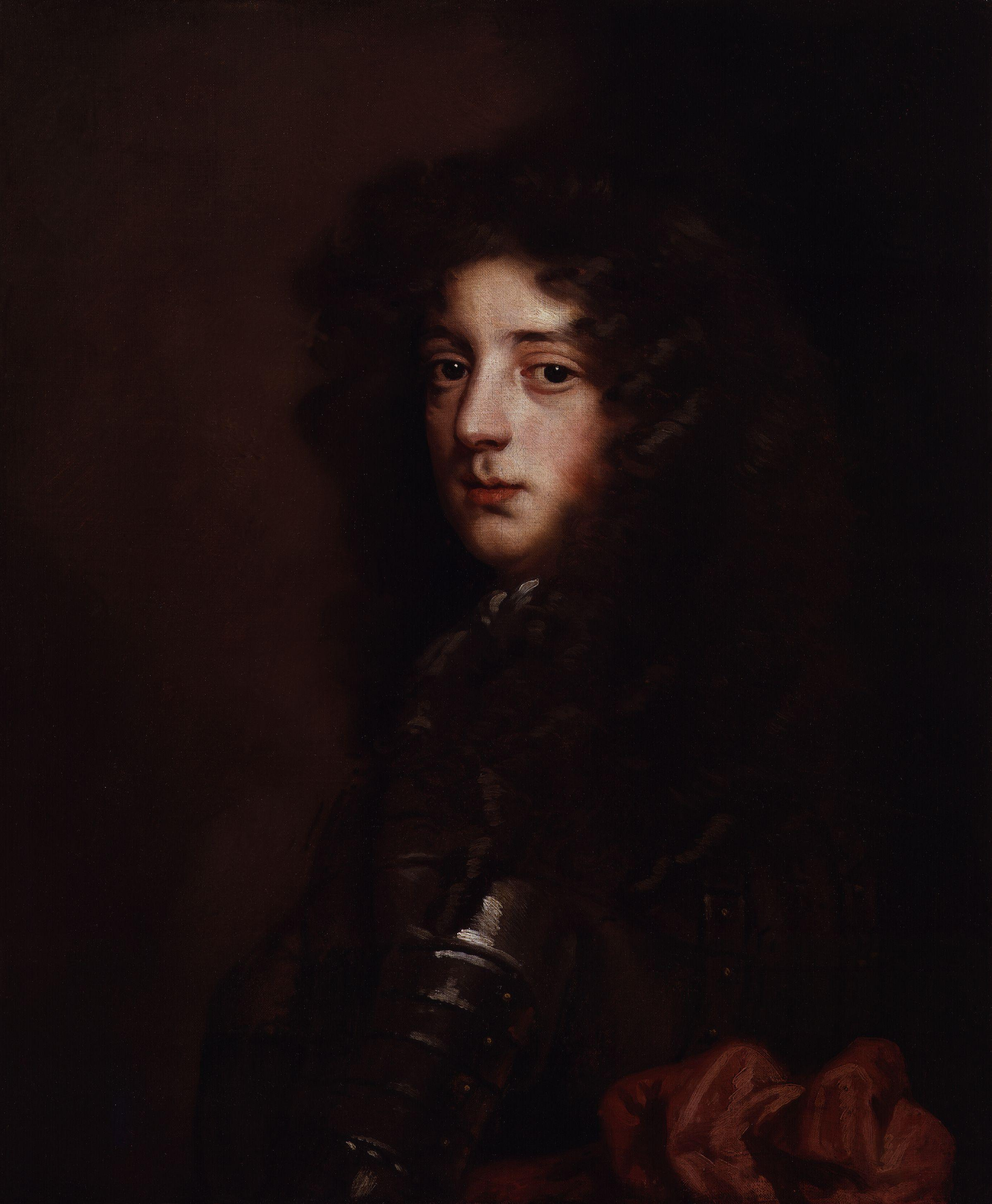
- The Whig Junto (top), Earl of Jersey (bottom left), Viscount Lonsdale (bottom middle), and Earl of Pembroke (bottom right).
- Date formed: Spring 1699; 327 years ago
- Date dissolved: May 1702; 324 years ago

People and organisations
- Monarch: William III
- Member party: Tory; Whigs
- Status in legislature: Majority coalition
- Opposition cabinet: None

History
- Elections: January 1701; November 1701
- Legislature terms: 4th Parliament of William III; 5th Parliament of William III; 6th Parliament of William III
- Predecessor: First Whig Junto
- Successor: Godolphin-Marlborough ministry

The Junto Tory Ministry was an English ministry established in Spring 1699, leading the Government of England as a loose Whig-Tory coalition until mid-1702 upon the death of King William III. It is named as such due to being a large coalition between the Whig Junto and Tories, rather than being led by a singular figurehead or Chief Minister.

== History ==
=== Formation ===
As the 1698-99 session closed, it was speculated amongst MPs that the King would dissolve the parliament and call another. However, there were fears that a new parliament would be worse than the current, as suggested by Somers and Vernon, especially given recent by-elections. As a result of these fears, William chose to create a composite ministry by combining the remains of the Whig Junto with key Tory figures, as an act of appeasement.

The King appointed the Earl of Jersey to Secretary of State for the Southern Department, the Viscount Lonsdale to Lord Privy Seal, and elevated the Earl of Pembroke to Lord President of the Council. These three were all nominally Tories, but were chosen for their alliegence to the King, rather than party alignment. After much negotiation, Montagu, Somers, and Orford were given places within the new ministry, with Montagu and Somers accepting, and Orford stating that he would rather be "drawn through a horse-pond" than be First Commissioner of the Admiralty. This prompted a reshuffle across the Admiralty, Treasury, and Board of Trade, due to different factions within the ministry hoping to appoint different people to each position.

This reshuffle, in order to create a fresh ministry but bend to the will of the old Junto, led to a loosely coordinated administration that lacked clear unity or leadership.

Additional changes occurred later in 1699, with Montagu resigning from the Treasury and Shrewsbury briefly returning to fill the vacant position of Lord Chamberlain, before resigning himself due to ill health.

=== Events ===
The ministry's tenure was largely occupied with the threat of war with France, as well as the succession crisis that was about to occur, given the death of Prince William in 1700.

In accordance with Tory wishes in the ministry, Robert Harley was elected Speaker of the House of Commons. This went against the King's wishes, showing the limits of royal control over parliamentary proceedings. Whilst Harley wasn't a member of the ministry, he had a strong influence over proceedings as speaker, and worked closely with Tory ministers to exert control.

Both the Whigs and Tories proved strong during this period, with the 1701 elections returning a very balanced House of Commons. This equal mix would prove difficult for the ministry, however, as strong debates occurred over the Security of the Succession, etc. Act 1701 and Parliamentary privilege, reigniting the divisions that led to the initial formation of the parties.

However, the two parties worked together well over the issue of French aggression, approving military plans and funding for the upcoming war. William III attempted to use this cooperation to try and create an "entire union" between the Kingdoms of England and Scotland, in order to reduce concerns over Protestant succession and the security of the Realm. Whilst these plans didn't get carried forward by the ministry, they would be supported by his successor, Queen Anne, culminating in the 1706 Treaty of Union.

=== Dissolution ===
On 7 March 1702, Parliament received word that the King was dying, and by the next day, he had been succeeded by Queen Anne. In line with the Parliament Act 1695, the Parliament continued meeting for 2 more months, to allow for the finalisation of war plans against France and Spain by England and the rest of the Grand Alliance. In May, England declared war, and the ministry was replaced with the Godolphin–Marlborough ministry.

== List of Ministers ==
OFFICE	NAME	TERM
Lord President of the Council	Thomas Herbert, 8th Earl of Pembroke	18 May 1699 – 29 January 1702
Lord President of the Council	Charles Seymour, 6th Duke of Somerset	29 January – 13 July 1702
First Lord of the Treasury	Charles Montagu, 1st Earl of Halifax	1 May 1697 – 15 November 1699
First Lord of the Treasury	Ford Grey, 1st Earl of Tankerville	15 November 1699 – 9 December 1700
First Lord of the Treasury	Sidney Godolphin, 1st Earl of Godolphin	9 December 1700 – 30 December 1701
First Lord of the Treasury	Charles Howard, 3rd Earl of Carlisle	30 December 1701 – 8 May 1702
Chancellor of the Exchequer	John Smith	2 June 1699 – 27 March 1701
Chancellor of the Exchequer	Henry Boyle, 1st Baron Carleton	1701–1708
Lord Chancellor	John Somers, 1st Baron Somers	1697–1700
Lord Chancellor	In Commission	1700
Lord Chancellor	Nathan Wright	1700–1705
Northern Secretary	James Vernon	26 December 1694–3 March 1695
Northern Secretary	Charles Hedges	2 December 1697–5 November 1700
Northern Secretary	James Vernon	5 November 1700–29 December 1701
Southern Secretary	Edward Villiers, 1st Earl of Jersey	14 May 1699–27 June 1700
Southern Secretary	James Vernon	27 June 1700–4 January 1702
Southern Secretary	Sir Charles Montagu, 1st Duke of Manchester	4 January 1702–1 May 1702
Archbishop of Canterbury	Thomas Tenison	6 December 1694–14 December 1715
Lord Privy Seal	John Lowther, 1st Viscount Lonsdale	1699–1700
Lord Privy Seal	Ford Grey, 1st Earl of Tankerville	1700–1701
Lord Privy Seal	In Commission	1701–1702
Lord Steward	William Cavendish, 1st Duke of Devonshire	1689–1707
Lord Chamberlain	Position Vacant	1697–1699
Lord Chamberlain	Charles Talbot, 1st Duke of Shrewsbury	1699–1700
Lord Chamberlain	Edward Villiers, 1st Earl of Jersey	1700–1704
Comptroller of the Household	Thomas Wharton, 5th Baron Wharton	1689–1702
Master-General of the Ordnance	Henry Sydney, 1st Earl of Romney	1693–1702
First Lord of the Admiralty	John Egerton, 3rd Earl of Bridgewater	1699–1701
First Lord of the Admiralty	Thomas Herbert, 8th Earl of Pembroke	1701–1702
Chancellor of the Duchy of Lancaster	Thomas Grey, 2nd Earl of Stamford	4 May 1697–12 May 1702
First Lord of Trade	Thomas Grey, 2nd Earl of Stamford	9 June 1699–19 June 1702
Secretary at War	George Clarke	1690–1704
Treasurer of the Navy	Sir Thomas de Littleton	1699–1710
Paymaster of the Forces	Richard Jones, 1st Earl of Ranelagh	26 December 1685–22 December 1702
Master of the Horses	Henry de Nassau, Lord Overkirk	1689–1702

== Notes ==
Preceded by First Whig Junto	Government of England; 1699–1702	Succeeded by Godolphin–Marlborough ministry
