= Carmarthen ministry =

- 1690-1694
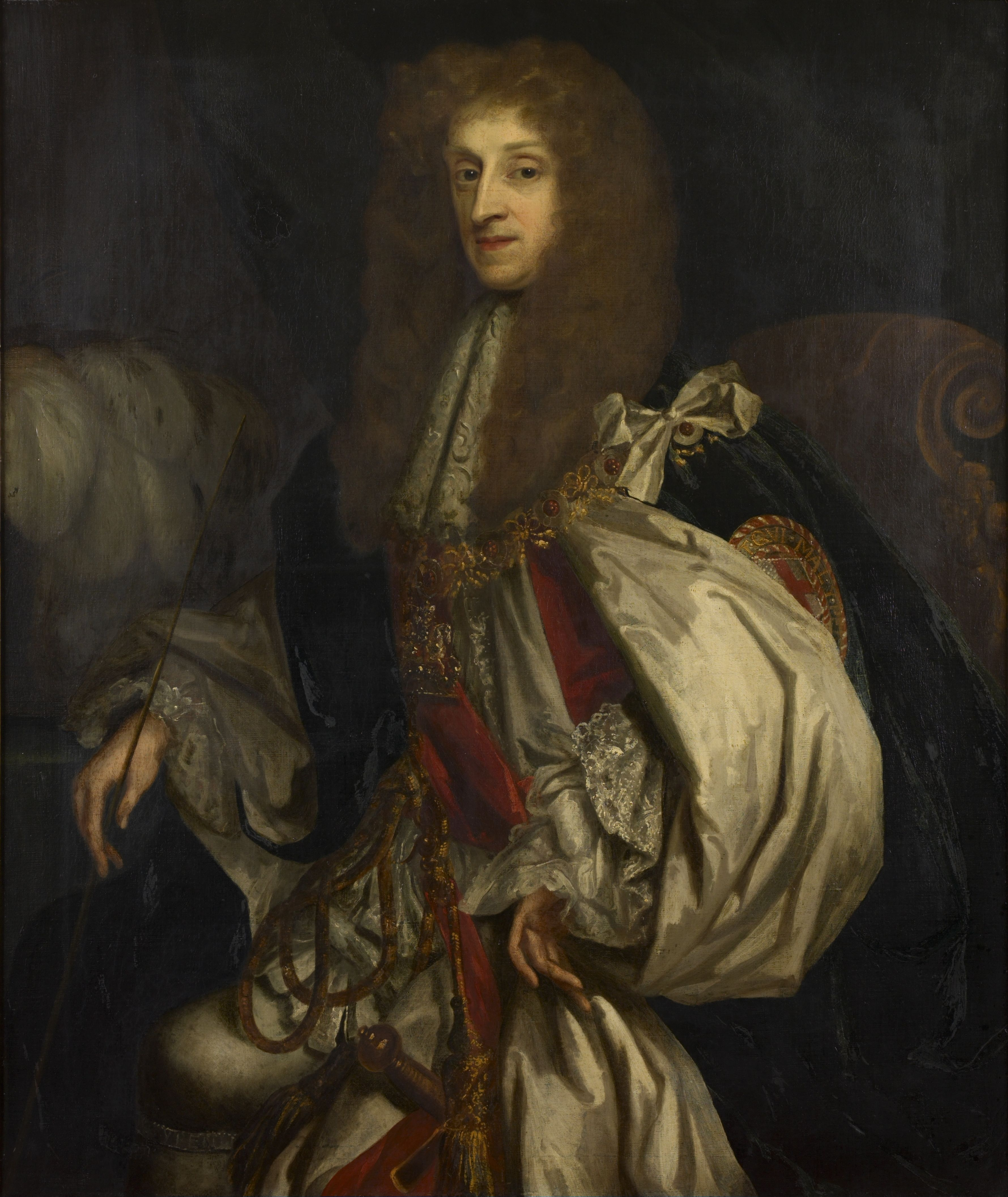
- Portrait, 1682
- Date formed: 1690; 336 years ago
- Date dissolved: 1694; 332 years ago

People and organisations
- Monarch: William III and Mary II
- Lord President of the Council: Thomas Osborne, 1st Marquess of Carmarthen
- Member party: Tory
- Status in legislature: Minority government
- Opposition cabinet: None

History
- Election: 1690
- Legislature term: 2nd Parliament of William III and Mary II
- Predecessor: Carmarthen–Halifax ministry
- Successor: First Whig Junto

Office	Name	Term
Lord President of the Council	Thomas Osborne, 1st Marquess of Carmarthen	1689–1699
First Lord of the Treasury	Sidney Godolphim, 1st Baron Godolphin	1690–1697
Chancellor of the Exchequer	Richard Hampden	18 March 1690 – 10 May 1694
Lord Keeper	In Commission until 1693	
Lord Keeper	John Somers, 1st Baron Somers	23 March 1693 – April, 1697
Northern Secretary	Henry Sydney, 1st Viscount Sydney	26 December 1694–3 March 1695
Northern Secretary	Daniel Finch, 2nd Earl of Nottingham	3 March 1692–23 March 1693
Northern Secretary	Sir John Trenchard	23 March 1693–2 March 1694
Southern Secretary	Daniel Finch, 2nd Earl of Nottingham	2 June 1690–November, 1693
Southern Secretary	Sir John Trenchard	November, 1693–27 April 1695
Archbishop of Canterbury	John Tillotson	23 April 1691–22 November 1694
Lord Privy Seal	In Commission until 1692	
Lord Privy Seal	Thomas Herbert, 8th Earl of Pembroke	1692–1699
Lord Steward	William Cavendish, 1st Duke of Devonshire	1689–1707
Lord Chamberlain	Charles Sackville, 6th Earl of Dorset	1689–1695
Comptroller of the Household	Thomas Wharton, 5th Baron Wharton	1689–1702
Master-General of the Ordnance	Vacant until 1693	
Master-General of the Ordnance	Henry Sydney, 1st Earl of Romney	1693–1702
Lord High Admiral	Thomas Herbert, 8th Earl of Pembroke	1690–1692
Lord High Admiral	Charles Cornwallis, 3rd Lord Cornwallis of Eye	1692–1693
Lord High Admiral	Anthony Carey, 5th Viscount Falkland	1693–1694

Preceded by Carmarthen–Halifax ministry	Government of England; 1690–1694	Succeeded by First Whig Junto
