= Clarendon ministry =

Government of England

- 1660-1667
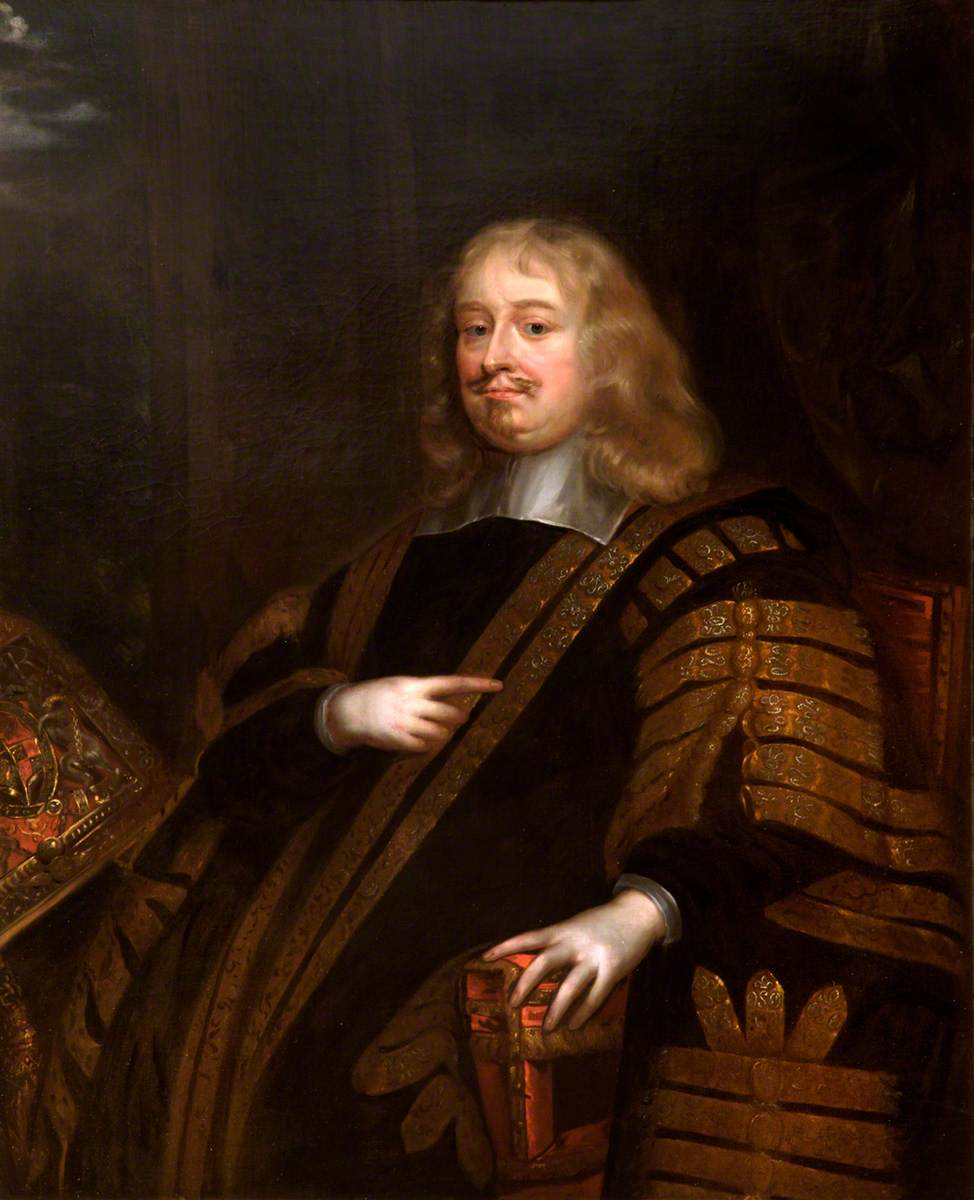
- Portrait of Clarendon, 1670
- Date formed: 1660; 366 years ago
- Date dissolved: 1667; 359 years ago

People and organisations
- Monarch: Charles II
- Lord Chancellor: Edward Hyde, 1st Baron Hyde, later 1st Earl of Clarendon
- Member party: Cavalier
- Status in legislature: Majority government
- Opposition cabinet: None

History
- Elections: 1660; 1661
- Legislature terms: 1st Parliament of Charles II; 2nd Parliament of Charles II
- Predecessor: Rump Parliament
- Successor: Cabal ministry

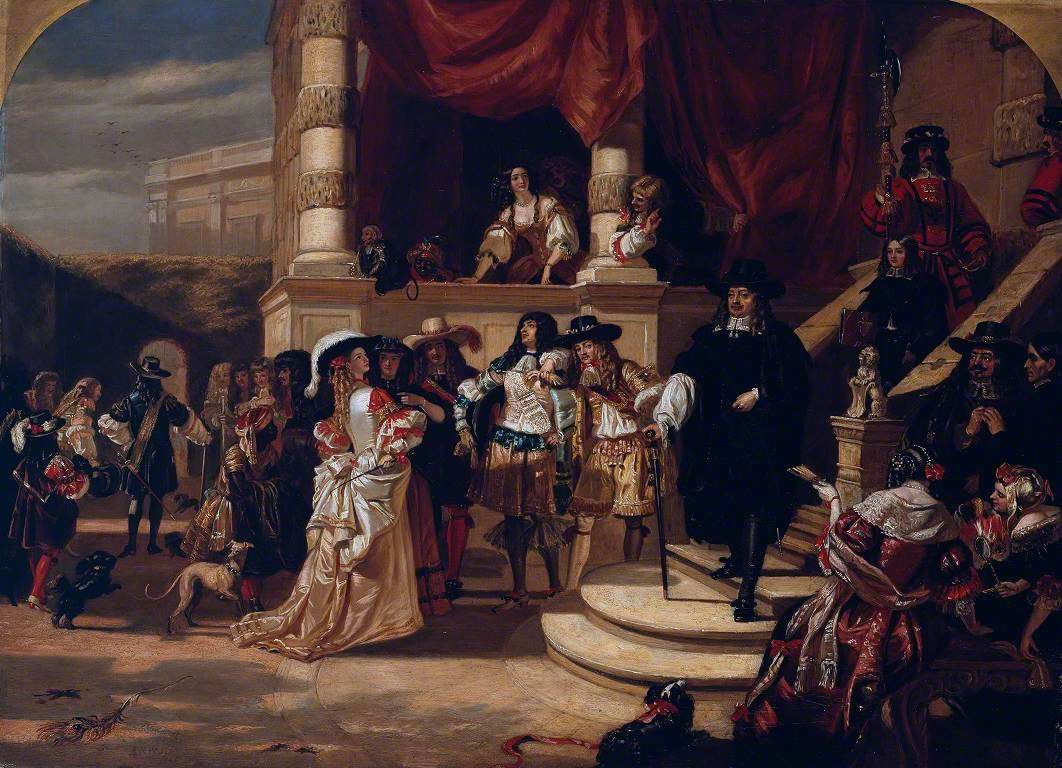
The Disgrace of Lord Clarendon by Edward Matthew Ward, 1846. It depicts Clarendon's dismissal by Charles II at Whitehall Palace in 1667.

The Clarendon ministry was forged out of the royalist camp of Charles II, who was returned to the throne (the English Restoration) in 1660. Two years previously, Lord Hyde (later Earl of Clarendon) had been appointed Lord Chancellor, and in 1660, he was joined by several other powerful statesmen, including the heir presumptive of the English throne, the Duke of York. After the Second Anglo-Dutch War, however, Charles lost confidence in his ministers, and in 1667, five statesmen took cooperative power in the Cabal ministry.

Lord Clarendon was impeached by the House of Commons and forced to flee; the Duke of Albemarle sold his position to George Villiers, 2nd Duke of Buckingham; and Sir George Carteret simply left his position, eventually being forced out of the House two years later.

== Committee for Foreign Affairs ==
The Privy Council Committee for Foreign Affairs served as the ministry; other significant statesmen not in the committee are listed in the next section. As the name of the ministry would suggest, Lord Clarendon (earlier Lord Hyde) was, in effect, the leader of the government.

Office	Name	Term	Notes
Lord Chancellor	Edward Hyde, 1st Baron Hyde	1660–1667	appointed 1658; created Earl of Clarendon in 1661
Lord High Treasurer	Thomas Wriothesley, 4th Earl of Southampton	1660–1667	died before government was dissolved
Lord Steward	James Butler, 1st Duke of Ormonde	1660–1667	also Lord Lieutenant of Ireland (1662–1668)
Master of the Horse	George Monck, 1st Duke of Albemarle	1660–1667	also Lord Lieutenant of Ireland (1660–1662)
Southern Secretary	Sir Edward Nicholas	1660–1662	appointed 1654
Southern Secretary	Sir Henry Bennet, Bt.	1662–1667	created Baron Arlington in 1664
Northern Secretary	Sir William Morice	1660–1667	created a baronet in 1661
Secretary to the Admiralty	Sir William Coventry	1665–1667	

== Ministers not in committee ==
Office	Name	Term	Notes
Lord Privy Seal	John Robartes, 1st Baron Robartes	1661–1667	
Lord High Admiral	Prince James, Duke of York	1660–1667	
Lord Chamberlain	Edward Montagu, 2nd Earl of Manchester	1660–1667	
Secretary of State for Scotland	John Maitland, 2nd Earl of Lauderdale	1660–1667	
Chancellor of the Exchequer	Anthony Ashley-Cooper, 1st Baron Ashley	1661–1667	
Treasurer of the Navy	Sir George Carteret, Bt.	1660–1667	also Vice-Chamberlain of the Household

Preceded by Commonwealth	Government of England; 1660–1667	Succeeded by Cabal ministry
