= First Minister of England =

First Minister of England may refer to:

- The chief minister of England, under the King or Queen of England from 946 to 1707.
- The office of the prime minister of the United Kingdom, sometimes referred to as that of First Minister of England due to Devolution in the UK.
