= List of English ministries =

This is a list of the ministries, in the sense of successive governments, of the Kingdom of England before its Union with the Kingdom of Scotland in the year 1707.

== Ministries of Charles II and James II: 1660–1688 ==
- Clarendon ministry (1660–1668)
- Cabal ministry (1668–1674)
- First Danby ministry (1674–1679)
- Privy Council ministry (1679)
- Ministry of the Chits (1679–1688)

== Ministries of William III and Mary II: 1689–1694 ==
- Carmarthen–Halifax ministry (1689–1690)
- Carmarthen ministry (1690–1694)

== Ministries of William III: 1694–1702 ==
- First Whig Junto (1694–1699)
- Junto Tory ministry (1699–1702)

== Ministries of Anne: 1702–1707 ==
- Godolphin–Marlborough ministry (1702–1708) (continued in the new Kingdom of Great Britain)

== See also ==
- List of British governments
- List of English chief ministers
