= Chafe-wax =

Archaic English occupation

A chafe-wax, or chaff-wax, was an officer under the Lord Chancellor, whose duty it was to prepare the wax for sealing documents. The office was abolished in 1852.

According to the Oxford English Dictionary, the earliest written reference was in 1607, when 'Chafewaxe' was defined as "an officer in chauncery, that fitteth the waxe for the sealing of the writs."

The expression comes from 'chafe', an obsolete verb meaning to warm or heat.

== Literature ==
In his 1850 short story, A Poor Man's Tale of a Patent, Charles Dickens satirises the cost and complexity of the English patent system, as it then was, by having his narrator comment that in order to get a patent in England "I went through thirty-five stages. I began with the Queen upon the Throne. I ended with the Deputy Chaff-wax. Note. I should like to see the Deputy Chaff-wax. Is it a man, or what is it?"

A late reference to the post occurs in a report of the Lord Chancellor's visit to the sporting estate of Sir John Fowler, 1st Baronet at Braemore by Garve, Ross-shire in September 1874, in which it was noted that "the official 'Chaff-wax' was busily occupied in melting the wax in the covered court where the deer are brought home, and it thus happened that by lamp light the unusual spectacle was observed of the solemnity of sealing being performed in the centre of a group of ponies laden with the Chancellor's dead deer".
