= John Trenchard (politician) =

English politician and landowner (1649–1695)

Sir John Trenchard
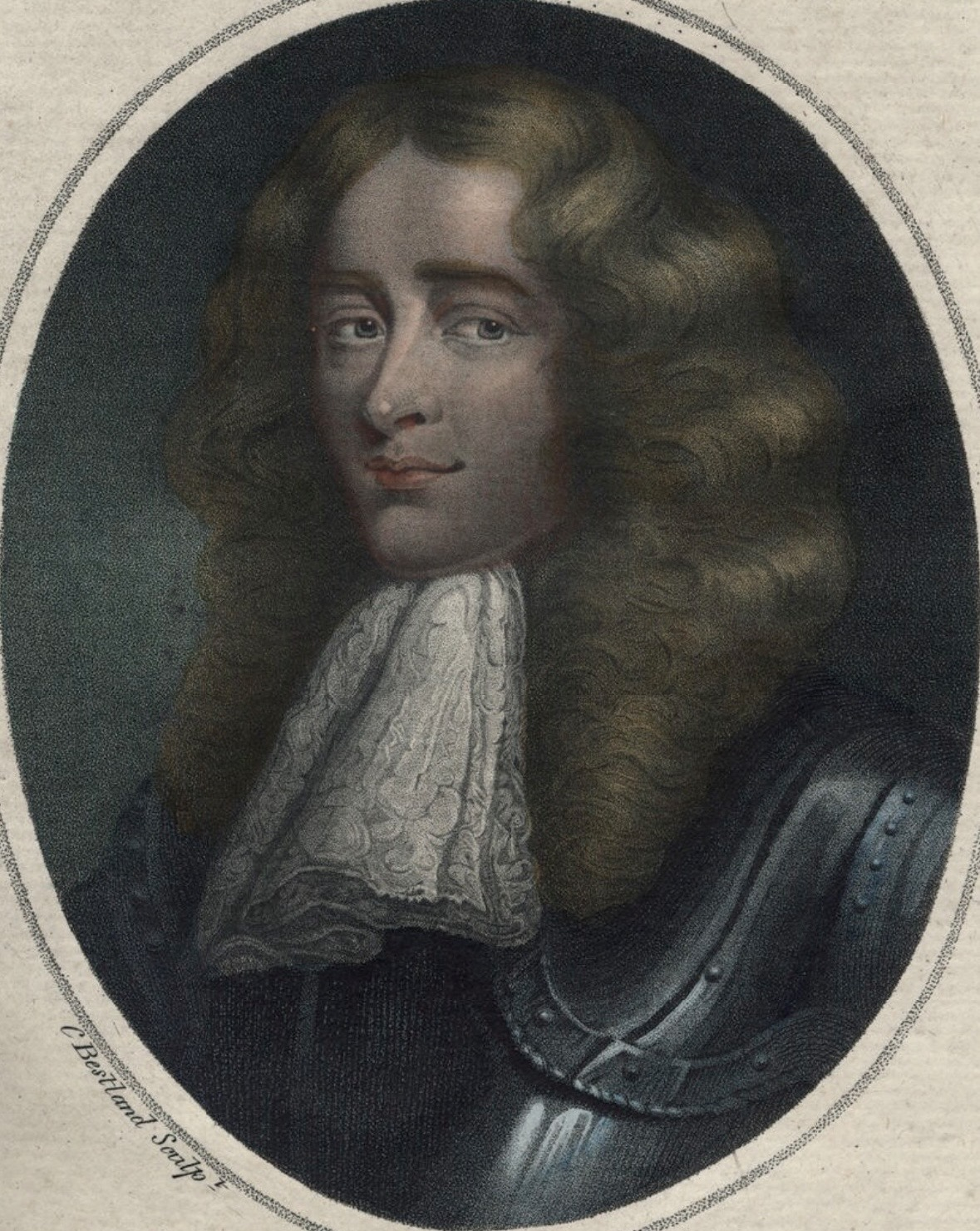
- Posthumous engraving, c. 1803

Secretary of State for the Southern Department
- In office 6 November 1693 – 27 April 1695
- Monarchs: William III and Mary II
- Preceded by: The Earl of Nottingham
- Succeeded by: The Duke of Shrewsbury

Secretary of State for the Northern Department
- In office 23 March 1693 – 2 March 1694
- Monarchs: William III and Mary II
- Preceded by: The Earl of Nottingham
- Succeeded by: The Duke of Shrewsbury

Personal details
- Born: 30 March 1649 Lytchett Matravers, Dorset
- Died: 27 April 1695 (aged 46) Kensington, London
- Resting place: Bloxworth, Dorset
- Relations: Richard Brodrepp (second cousin)

Mural monument to Sir John Trenchard, St Andrew's Church, Bloxworth. Displaying the arms of Trenchard impaling Speke

Sir John Trenchard (30 March 1649 – 27 April 1695) was an English politician and landowner.

== Life ==
He belonged to an old Dorset family. He was born on 30 March 1649 at Lytchett Matravers, near Poole, to Thomas Trenchard of Wolverton (1615–1671), and his wife Hannah née Henley (d. 1691). His grandfather was Sir Thomas Trenchard of Wolverton (1582–1657), who was knighted by James I in 1613.

He was educated at Winchester (1661-1665) and at New College, Oxford (1665-1667). In 1667, he entered the Middle Temple and was called to the bar in 1674. John Trenchard entered parliament as member for Taunton in 1679. He associated himself with those who proposed to exclude the Duke of York from the throne, and attended some of the meetings held by these malcontents. It is possible he was concerned in the Rye House Plot. In fact, he was arrested at all of the events in July 1683, but no definite evidence was brought against him so he was released.

When Monmouth landed in the west of England in June 1685, Trenchard fled from England to Groningen, Netherlands. Around 1687–1688, he was pardoned through the good offices of William Penn, and able to return home. Again he entered parliament, but he took no active part in the Revolution of 1688, although he managed to secure the good will of William III. On 29 October 1689, he was knighted by the king, and made Chief Justice of Chester. In 1692, he was appointed Secretary of State. He and the government incurred much ridicule through their failure to prove the existence of a great Jacobite plot in Lancashire and Cheshire in which they had been led to believe.

== Family ==
On 10 November 1682, he married: Philippa Speke (1664–1743), daughter of George and Mary Speke of White Lackington, Somerset, with four sons and three daughters including:

1. George Trenchard (d. 1758)
2. Maria Trenchard (1687-)
3. William Trenchard (12 October 1694-)

Sir John died on 27 April 1695 at Kensington, London, of tuberculosis and he is buried at Bloxworth, Dorset.

== See also ==
- Whig Junto

== Notes ==
Parliament of England
Preceded by Sir William Wyndham, Bt; Sir William Portman, Bt	Member of Parliament for Taunton with Sir William Portman, Bt1679; Sir John Cutler, Bt 1679–1680; Edmund Prideaux 1680–1685; 1679–1685	Succeeded by Sir William Portman, Bt; John Sanford
Preceded by William Harbord; Sir Francis Guybon	Member of Parliament for Thetford with 1689–1690	Succeeded by Sir Francis Guybon; William Harbord
Preceded by Henry Trenchard; Sir Nathaniel Napier, Bt	Member of Parliament for Poole with Sir Nathaniel Napier, Bt; 1690–1695	Succeeded by Sir Nathaniel Napier, Bt; Lord Ashley
Political offices
Preceded by The Earl of Nottingham	Secretary of State for the Northern Department; 1693–1694	Succeeded by The Duke of Shrewsbury
Preceded by The Earl of Nottingham	Secretary of State for the Southern Department; 1693–1695	Succeeded by The Duke of Shrewsbury
Legal offices
Preceded by Sir Job Charlton	Chief Justice of Chester; 1689–1690	Succeeded by John Coombe
