= Secretary of State for the Northern Department =

Former cabinet position in Great Britain

Great Britain Office of the Secretary of State for the Northern Department
- Coat of Arms of the Kingdom of Great Britain Government

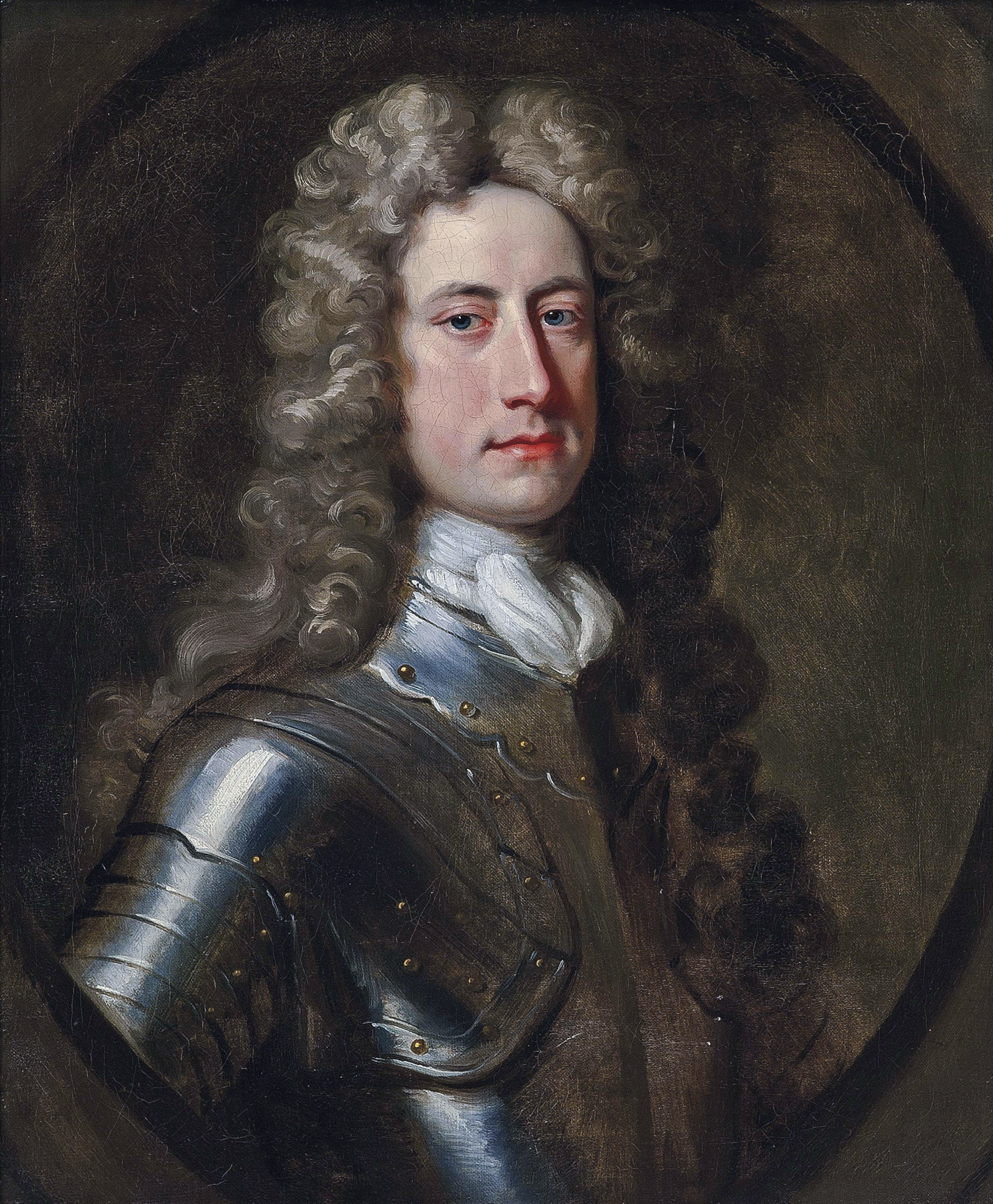
- Longest serving William Stanhope, 1st Earl of Harrington; 19 June 1730 – 12 February 1742
- The Northern Department
- Style: The Right Honourable (formal prefix)
- Member of: British Cabinet
- Seat: Westminster, London
- Appointer: The British Monarch on advice of the Prime Minister
- Term length: No fixed term
- Formation: 1660–1782
- First holder: Sir William Morice
- Final holder: David Murray, 7th Viscount Stormont

The secretary of state for the Northern Department was a position in the Cabinet of the government of Great Britain up to 1782. Following this, the Northern Department became the Foreign Office, and the position evolved into the foreign secretary.

== History ==
Before the Act of Union, 1707, the secretary of state's responsibilities were in relation to the English government. Even after the Union, there was still a separate secretary of state for Scotland until 1746, though the post was sometimes vacant. This continued the previous Scottish government post of Secretary of State.

Before 1782, the responsibilities of the two secretaries of state for the Northern and the Southern Departments were not divided up in terms of area of authority, but rather geographically. The secretary of state for the Northern Department was responsible for relations with the Netherlands, Scandinavia, Poland, Russia, and the Holy Roman Empire. The secretary of state for the Southern Department was responsible for Ireland, the Channel Islands, France, Spain, Portugal, Switzerland, the Italian states, and the Ottoman Empire. Domestic responsibilities in England and Wales were shared between the two Secretaries. After the union with Scotland in 1707, the two secretaries also took responsibility for Scotland when there was no secretary of state for Scotland in office.

Until 1706, the practice was generally for the senior official to lead the Southern Department, and the junior the Northern Department, with the Northern Secretary being transferred to the Southern Department when a vacancy arose at the latter. During the reigns of George I and George II, however, the Northern Department began to be seen as the more important, since its responsibilities included the monarchs' ancestral home of Hanover. During the reign of George III, the two departments were of approximately equal importance.

In 1782, the two secretaries of state were reformed as the secretary of state for the Home Department and the secretary of state for foreign affairs. During the 18th century, secretaries of state for the Northern Department, if peers, were often Leaders of the House of Lords as well.

== Secretaries of state for the Northern Department, 1660–1782 ==
Included:

Portrait	Name Constituency	Term of office		Notes
	Sir William Morice; MP for Plymouth	27 May 1660	29 September 1668	
	Sir John Trevor; MP for Arundel until 1661; MP for Great Bedwyn after 1661	29 September 1668	28 May 1672	
	Henry Coventry; MP for Droitwich	3 July 1672	11 September 1674	
	Sir Joseph Williamson; MP for Thetford	11 September 1674	20 February 1679	
	Robert Spencer; 2nd Earl of Sunderland	10 February 1679	26 April 1680	
	Sir Leoline Jenkins; MP for Oxford University	26 April 1680	2 February 1681	
	Edward Conway; 1st Earl of Conway	2 February 1681	January; 1683	
	Robert Spencer; 2nd Earl of Sunderland	28 January 1683	1684	
	Sidney Godolphin; MP for Helston	17 April 1684	24 August 1684	
	Charles Middleton; 2nd Earl of Middleton; MP for Winchelsea after 1685	24 August 1684	28 October 1688	
	Richard Graham; 1st Viscount Preston; MP for Cumberland	29 October 1688	2 December 1688	
	Daniel Finch; 2nd Earl of Nottingham	5 March 1689	26 December 1690	
	Henry Sydney; 1st Viscount Sydney	26 December 1690	3 March 1692	
	Daniel Finch; 2nd Earl of Nottingham	3 March 1692	23 March 1693	
	Sir John Trenchard; MP for Poole	23 March 1693	2 March 1694	
	Charles Talbot; 1st Duke of Shrewsbury	2 March 1694	3 May 1695	
	Sir William Trumbull; MP for Oxford University	3 May 1695	2 December 1697	
	James Vernon; MP for Penryn until 1699; MP for Westminster after 1699	2 December 1697	5 November 1700	
	Sir Charles Hedges; MP for Malmesbury	5 November 1700	29 December 1701	
	James Vernon; MP for Westminster	4 January 1702	1 May 1702	
	Sir Charles Hedges; MP for Malmesbury until 1702; MP for Calne after 1702	2 May 1702	18 May 1704	
	Robert Harley; MP for Radnor	16 May 1704	13 February 1708	
	Henry Boyle; MP for Westminster	13 February 1708	21 September 1710	
	Henry St John; 1st Viscount Bolingbroke; MP for Berkshire until 1712; Viscount Bolingbroke after 1712	21 September 1710	17 August 1713	
	Sir William Bromley; MP for Oxford University	17 August 1713	17 September 1714	
	Charles Townshend; 2nd Viscount Townshend	17 September 1714	12 December 1716	
	James Stanhope	12 December 1716	12 April 1717	
	Charles Spencer; 3rd Earl of Sunderland	12 April 1717	2 March 1718	
	James Stanhope; 1st Earl Stanhope	19 March 1718	5 February 1721	
	Charles Townshend; 2nd Viscount Townshend	10 February 1721	16 May 1730	
	William Stanhope; 1st Baron Harrington	19 June 1730	12 February 1742	
	John Carteret; 2nd Earl Granville	12 February 1742	24 November 1744	Highest title 2nd Baron Carteret until 18 October 1744
	William Stanhope; 1st Earl of Harrington	24 November 1744	10 February 1746	
	John Carteret; 2nd Earl Granville	10 February 1746	12 February 1746	Disputed due to the brevity of the Short-lived ministry, only Secretary of State to receive seals of office before the collapse of the ministry
	William Stanhope; 1st Earl of Harrington	12 February 1746	29 October 1746	
	Philip Stanhope; 4th Earl of Chesterfield	29 October 1746	6 February 1748	
	Thomas Pelham-Holles; 1st Duke of Newcastle	6 February 1748	23 March 1754	
	Robert Darcy; 4th Earl of Holderness	23 March 1754	25 March 1761	as sole Secretary: 6 April 1757 — 27 June 1757
	John Stuart; 3rd Earl of Bute	25 March 1761	27 May 1762	
	George Grenville; MP for Buckingham	5 June 1762	9 October 1762	
	George Montagu-Dunk; 2nd Earl of Halifax	14 October 1762	9 September 1763	
	John Montagu; 4th Earl of Sandwich	9 September 1763	10 July 1765	
	George Montagu-Dunk; 2nd Earl of Halifax	September; 1763	July; 1765	
	Augustus Henry Fitzroy; 3rd Duke of Grafton	12 July 1765	14 May 1766	
	Henry Seymour Conway; MP for Thetford	23 May 1766	20 January 1768	
	Thomas Thynne; 3rd Viscount Weymouth	20 January 1768	21 October 1768	
	William Nassau de Zuylestein; 4th Earl of Rochford	21 October 1768	19 December 1770	
	John Montagu; 4th Earl of Sandwich	19 December 1770	12 January 1771	
	George Montagu-Dunk; 2nd Earl of Halifax	22 January 1771	6 June 1771	
	Henry Howard; 12th Earl of Suffolk	12 June 1771	7 March 1779	
	David Murray; 7th Viscount Stormont	27 October 1779	27 March 1782	

== See also ==
- Secretary of State of England
- Secretary of State for the Southern Department
- Home Secretary

== Sources ==
- Anson, Sir William Reynell (1892). The Law and Custom of the Constitution. Clarendon Press. pp. 157–158.
- Sainty, J.C. (1973). Office-Holders in Modern Britain: Volume 2 Officials of the Secretaries of State 1660-1782. pp. 22–58.
