= Secretary of State for the Southern Department =

Former British political position

Great Britain Secretary of State for the Southern Department
- Coat of Arms of the Government of the Kingdom of Great Britain
- The Southern Department
- Style: The Right Honourable (formal prefix)
- Member of: British Cabinet
- Seat: Westminster, London
- Appointer: The British monarch on advice of the prime minister
- Term length: No fixed term
- Formation: 1660–1782
- First holder: Edward Nicholas
- Final holder: Wills Hill, 1st Earl of Hillsborough

The secretary of state for the Southern Department was a position in the cabinet of the government of the Kingdom of Great Britain up to 1782, when the Southern Department became the Home Office.

== History ==
Before 1782, the responsibilities of the two British secretaries of state for the Northern and the Southern departments were divided not based on the principles of modern ministerial divisions, but geographically. The secretary of state for the Southern Department was responsible for Ireland, the Channel Islands, France, Spain, Portugal, the Old Swiss Confederacy, the states of Italy, and the Ottoman Empire. He was also responsible for the American colonies until 1768, when the charge was given to the secretary of state for the colonies. The secretary of state for the Northern Department was responsible for relations with the Dutch Republic, Scandinavia, Poland, Russia, and the Holy Roman Empire. Domestic responsibilities in England and Wales were shared between the two Secretaries. After the union with Scotland in 1707, the two secretaries also took responsibility for Scotland when there was no secretary of state for Scotland in office.

Until 1706, the practice was generally for the senior official to lead the Southern Department, and the junior the Northern Department, with the Northern Secretary being transferred to the Southern Department when a vacancy arose at the latter. During the reigns of George I and George II, however, the Northern Department began to be seen as the more important, since its responsibilities included the monarchs' ancestral home of Hanover. During the reign of George III, the two departments were of approximately equal importance.

In 1782, the two secretaries of state were reformed as the secretary of state for the Home Department and the secretary of state for foreign affairs.

== List of southern secretaries ==
Secretary of State for the Southern Department
Portrait	Name (Birth–Death)	Term of office		Monarch (Reign)	Ref.
	Sir Edward Nicholas (1593–1669)	1 June 1660	20 October 1662	Charles II (1660–1685)	
	Henry Bennet; 1st Earl of Arlington (1618–1685) (Note: Returned as MP for Callington from 1661 to 1665; thereafter raised to the peerage of England as Baron Arlington, and created Earl of Arlington in 1672.)	20 October 1662	11 September 1674	Charles II (1660–1685)	
	Henry Coventry; MP for Droitwich (c. 1618–1686)	11 September 1674	26 April 1680	Charles II (1660–1685)	
	Robert Spencer; 2nd Earl of Sunderland (1641–1702)	26 April 1680	2 February 1681	Charles II (1660–1685)	
	Sir Leoline Jenkins; MP for Oxford University (c. 1625–1685)	2 February 1681	14 April 1684	Charles II (1660–1685)	
	Robert Spencer; 2nd Earl of Sunderland (1641–1702)	14 April 1684	28 October 1688	Charles II (1660–1685)	
	Robert Spencer; 2nd Earl of Sunderland (1641–1702)	14 April 1684	28 October 1688	James II (1685–1688)	
	Charles Middleton; 2nd Earl of Middleton (c. 1650–1719)	28 October 1688	2 December 1688	James II (1685–1688)	
	Charles Talbot; 12th Earl of Shrewsbury (1660–1718)	14 February 1689	2 June 1690	Mary II (1689–1694) & William III (1689–1702)	
	Daniel Finch; 2nd Earl of Nottingham (1647–1730) (Note: Served as sole Secretary of State from June to December 1690; again from March 1692 to March 1693.)	2 June 1690	6 November 1693	Mary II (1689–1694) & William III (1689–1702)	
	Sir John Trenchard; MP for Poole (1649–1695) (Note: Served as sole Secretary of State from November to March 1694.)	6 November 1693	27 April 1695	Mary II (1689–1694) & William III (1689–1702)	
	Charles Talbot; 1st Duke of Shrewsbury (1660–1718)	27 April 1695	12 December 1698	Mary II (1689–1694) & William III (1689–1702)	
	James Vernon; MP for Westminster (1646–1727) (Note: Acting Secretary of State for the Southern Department.)	12 December 1698	14 May 1699	Mary II (1689–1694) & William III (1689–1702)	
	Edward Villiers; 1st Earl of Jersey (c. 1656–1711)	14 May 1699	27 June 1700	Mary II (1689–1694) & William III (1689–1702)	
	James Vernon; MP for Westminster (1646–1727) (Note: Acting Secretary of State for the Southern Department from June to November 1700; official appointment from 5 November 1700.)	27 June 1700	4 January 1702	Mary II (1689–1694) & William III (1689–1702)	
	Charles Montagu; 4th Earl of Manchester (c. 1662–1722)	4 January 1702	1 May 1702	Mary II (1689–1694) & William III (1689–1702)	
	Charles Montagu; 4th Earl of Manchester (c. 1662–1722)	4 January 1702	1 May 1702	Anne (1702–1714)	
	Daniel Finch; 2nd Earl of Nottingham (1647–1730)	2 May 1702	22 April 1704	Anne (1702–1714)	
	Sir Charles Hedges; MP for West Looe (1650–1714) (Note: Returned as MP for Calne from 1702 to 1705; thereafter returned as MP for West Looe from 1705 to 1713.)	18 May 1704	3 December 1706	Anne (1702–1714)	
	Charles Spencer; 3rd Earl of Sunderland (1675–1722)	3 December 1706	13 June 1710	Anne (1702–1714)	
	William Legge; 1st Earl of Dartmouth (1672–1750)	15 June 1710	6 August 1713	Anne (1702–1714)	
	Henry St John; 1st Viscount Bolingbroke (1678–1751)	17 August 1713	31 August 1714	Anne (1702–1714)	
	Henry St John; 1st Viscount Bolingbroke (1678–1751)	17 August 1713	31 August 1714	George I (1714–1727)	
	James Stanhope; MP for Cockermouth (1673–1721) (Note: Returned as MP for Wendover from March 1715 to 1715; thereafter returned as MP for Cockermouth from 1715 to 1717.)	27 September 1714	22 June 1716	George I (1714–1727)	
	Sir Paul Methuen; MP for Brackley (c. 1672–1757) (Note: Acting Secretary of State for the Southern Department from May to December 1723; official appointment from 12 December 1716.)	22 June 1716	10 April 1717	George I (1714–1727)	
	Joseph Addison; MP for Malmesbury (1672–1719)	12 April 1717	14 March 1718	George I (1714–1727)	
	James Craggs 'the Younger'; MP for Tregony (1686–1721)	16 March 1718	16 February 1721	George I (1714–1727)	
	John Carteret; 2nd Baron Carteret (1690–1763)	4 March 1721	31 March 1724	George I (1714–1727)	
	Thomas Pelham-Holles; 1st Duke of Newcastle (1693–1768) (Note: In February 1746 John Carteret, 2nd Earl Granville held office for two days, however as the formalities of his appointment were not completed sources typically do not include him as a Southern Secretary.)	6 April 1724	12 February 1748	George I (1714–1727)	
	Thomas Pelham-Holles; 1st Duke of Newcastle (1693–1768)	6 April 1724	12 February 1748	George II (1727–1760)	
	John Russell; 4th Duke of Bedford (1710–1771)	12 February 1748	13 June 1751	George II (1727–1760)	
	Robert Darcy; 4th Earl of Holderness (1718–1778)	18 June 1751	23 March 1754	George II (1727–1760)	
	Sir Thomas Robinson; MP for Christchurch (1695–1770)	24 March 1754	October; 1755	George II (1727–1760)	
	Henry Fox; MP for Windsor (1705–1774)	14 November 1755	13 November 1756	George II (1727–1760)	
	William Pitt 'the Elder'; MP for Okehampton (1708–1778)	4 December 1756	6 April 1757	George II (1727–1760)	
	Robert Darcy; 4th Earl of Holderness (1718–1778) (Note: Served as sole Secretary of State.)	6 April 1757	27 June 1757	George II (1727–1760)	
	William Pitt 'the Elder'; MP for Bath (1708–1778)	27 June 1757	5 October 1761	George II (1727–1760)	
	William Pitt 'the Elder'; MP for Bath (1708–1778)	27 June 1757	5 October 1761	George III (1760–1820)	
	Charles Wyndham; 2nd Earl of Egremont (1710–1763)	9 October 1761	21 August 1763	George III (1760–1820)	
	George Montagu-Dunk; 2nd Earl of Halifax (1716–1771)	9 September 1763	10 July 1765	George III (1760–1820)	
	Henry Seymour Conway; MP for Thetford (1719–1795)	12 July 1765	23 May 1766	George III (1760–1820)	
	Charles Lennox; 3rd Duke of Richmond (1735–1806)	23 May 1766	29 July 1766	George III (1760–1820)	
	William Petty; 2nd Earl of Shelburne (1737–1805)	30 July 1766	20 October 1768	George III (1760–1820)	
	Thomas Thynne; 3rd Viscount Weymouth (1734–1796)	21 October 1768	12 December 1770	George III (1760–1820)	
	William de Zuylestein; 4th Earl of Rochford (1717–1781)	19 December 1770	9 November 1775	George III (1760–1820)	
	Thomas Thynne; 3rd Viscount Weymouth (1734–1796) (Note: Served as sole Secretary of State from March to October 1799.)	9 November 1775	November; 1779	George III (1760–1820)	
	Wills Hill; 1st Earl of Hillsborough (1718–1793)	25 November 1779	27 March 1782	George III (1760–1820)	

== See also ==
- Secretary of State (England)
