= Robert Dudley (explorer) =

English engineer, explorer and cartographer (1574–1649)

Sir Robert Dudley
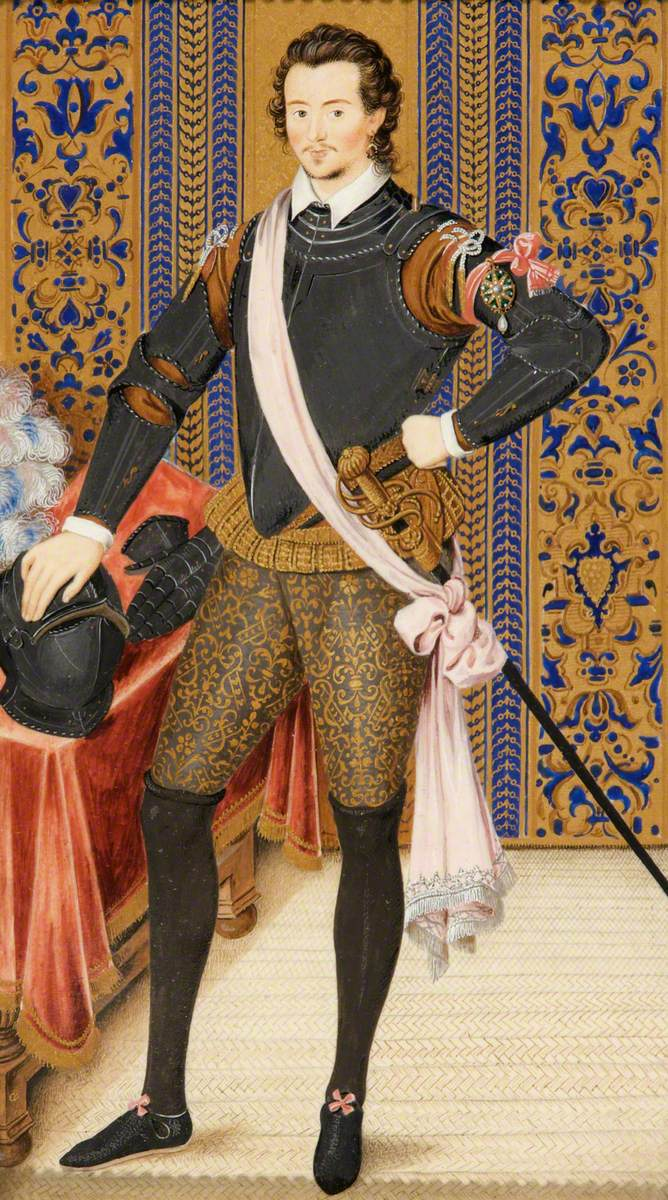
- Robert Dudley, 1590s Portrait by Nicholas Hilliard
- Born: 7 August 1574; Richmond Palace, Surrey, England
- Died: 6 September 1649 (aged 75); Villa Rinieri, Grand Duchy of Tuscany
- Resting place: San Pancrazio, Florence
- Known for: Courtier, explorer, cartographer, shipbuilder, engineer
- Notable work: Dell'Arcano del Mare
- Spouse(s): Margaret Cavendish; Alice Leigh; Elizabeth Southwell
- Children: Alice Sutton; Douglas Dansey; Catherine Leveson; Frances Kniveton; Anne Holborne; Carlo Dudley; Ambrogio Dudley; Ferdinando Dudley; Teresa, Duchessa di Castiglione del Lago; Cosimo Dudley; Maria Christina, Marchesa Clivola; Maria Magdalena, Marchesa Malaspina; Antonio Dudley; Enrico Dudley; Anna Dudley; Giovanni Dudley
- Parent(s): Robert Dudley, 1st Earl of Leicester; Douglas Sheffield (née Howard)

Sir Robert Dudley (7 August 1574 – 6 September 1649) was an English explorer and cartographer. In 1594, he led an expedition to the West Indies, of which he wrote an account. The illegitimate son of Robert Dudley, 1st Earl of Leicester, the lifelong favourite of Queen Elizabeth I, he inherited the bulk of the Earl's estate in accordance with his father's will, including Kenilworth Castle.

In 1603–1605, he tried unsuccessfully to establish his legitimacy in court. After that he left England forever, finding a new existence in the service of the grand dukes of Tuscany. There, he worked as an engineer and shipbuilder, and designed and published Dell'Arcano del Mare (1645–1646), the first maritime atlas to cover the whole world. He was also a skilled navigator and mathematician. In Italy, he styled himself as the "Earl of Warwick and Leicester", as well as the "Duke of Northumberland", a title recognized by Emperor Ferdinand II.

Dudley was considered a bigamist, because he had married Alice Leigh while still a member of the Church of England, but had married his cousin Elizabeth Southwell after abandoning Alice and converting to Roman Catholicism. For the second marriage, the couple received a papal dispensation because they were blood relatives.

== Early life ==
Robert Dudley was the son of Robert Dudley, 1st Earl of Leicester and his lover Douglas Sheffield, daughter of William Howard, 1st Baron Howard of Effingham. He grew up in the houses of his father and his father's friends, but had leave to see his mother whenever she wished. His mother married Sir Edward Stafford in November 1579, and then left for Paris. Leicester was fond of his son and often made trips to see him.

Dudley was given an excellent education and was enrolled at Christ Church, Oxford, in 1587, with the status of filius comitis ("Earl's son"). There, his mentor was Thomas Chaloner, who also became his close friend. In 1588, when the Spanish Armada threatened England during the Anglo-Spanish War, the 14-year-old Robert joined his father, who was commanding the army at Tilbury Camp, preparing to resist a Spanish invasion, but on 4 September, the Earl of Leicester died. His will gave Dudley a large inheritance, including the castle and estate at Kenilworth, and on the death of his uncle, Ambrose Dudley, 3rd Earl of Warwick, the lordships of Denbigh and Chirk.

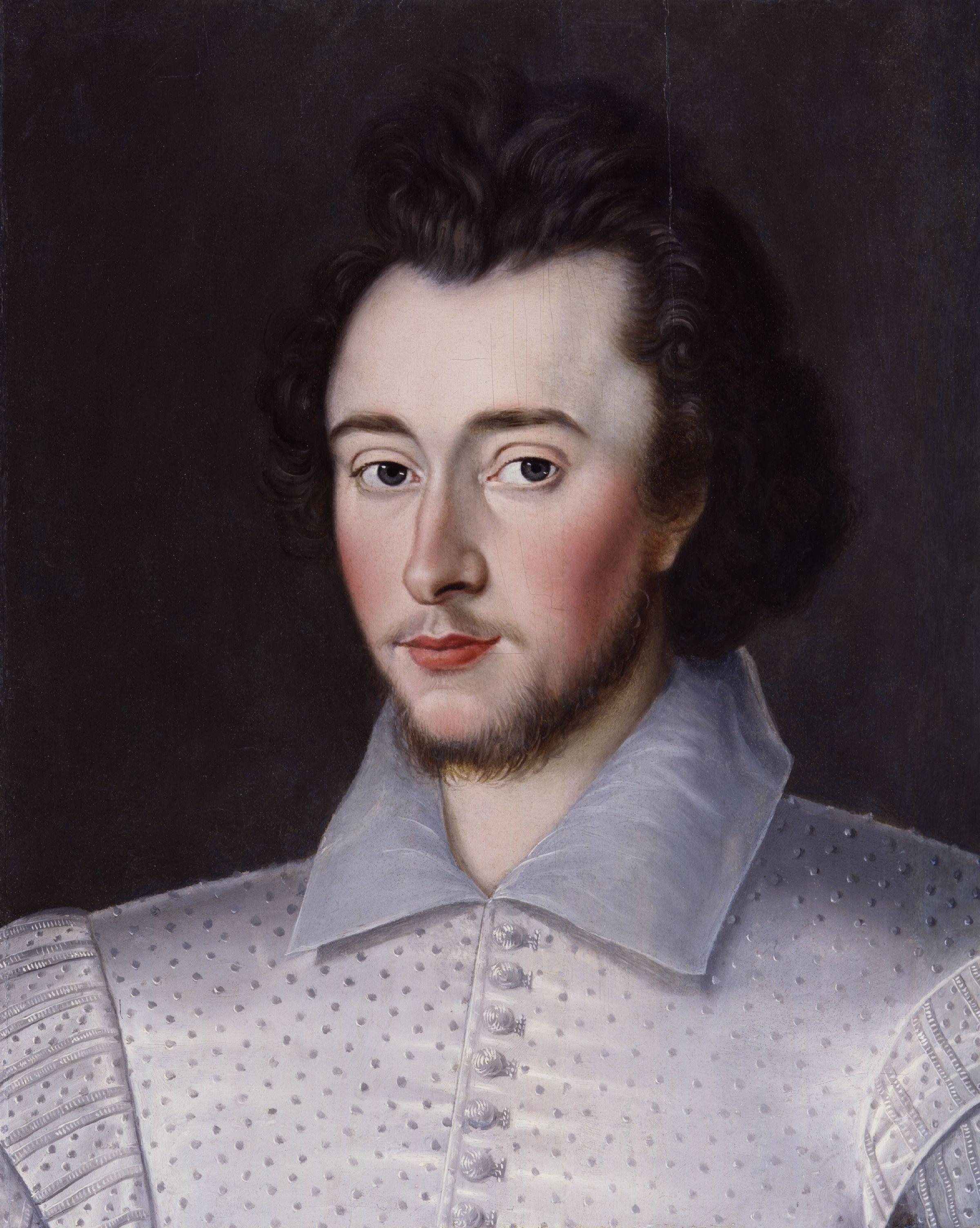
Probable likeness of Robert Dudley, c. 1591

In early 1591, Dudley was contracted to marry Frances Vavasour with the consent of Queen Elizabeth I, who liked Dudley very much but wished him to wait until he was older. Later that year, Vavasour secretly married another man and was banished from court. In turn, the 17-year-old Dudley married Margaret, a sister of Sir Thomas Cavendish, in whose last voyage he had probably invested. Dudley was excluded from court for this secret marriage, but only for a few days. Margaret was given two ships by her father Robert, named the Leicester and the Roebuck. She soon died childless.

== Expeditions ==
In 1594, Dudley assembled a fleet of ships, including his flagship, the galleon Beare, as well as the Beare's Whelpe, and the pinnaces Earwig and Frisking. He intended to use them to harass the Spaniards in the Atlantic. The Queen did not approve of his plans, because of his inexperience and the value of the ships. She did commission him as a general but insisted that he sail to Guiana, instead.

Dudley recruited 275 veteran sailors, including the navigator Abraham Kendal, and the captains Thomas Jobson and Benjamin Wood. Dudley's fleet sailed on 6 November 1594, but a sudden storm separated the ships and drove the vessels back to different ports. Dudley sent word to the captain of the Beare's Whelp to join him in the Canary Islands or Cabo Blanco, and he sailed again.

At first, Dudley's trip proved unlucky: the Earwig sank, and most of the vessels he encountered were friendly. Dudley led only one raid in the Gulf of Lagos.

In December, the expedition finally managed to capture two Spanish ships at Tenerife. Dudley renamed them Intent and Regard, manned them with his sailors, and put Captain Wood in charge. He sailed to Cabo Blanco, expecting to meet the Beare's Whelpe there, but it did not show up. Dudley's fleet sailed to Trinidad and anchored at Cedros Bay on 31 January 1595. There, he discovered an island that he claimed for the English crown and named Dudleiana. Then he sailed to Paracoa Bay for repairs and made a reconnaissance to San José de Oruña, but decided not to attack it.

Dudley divided his forces, sending the Intent and Regard to the north. In Trinidad, he recruited a Spanish-speaking Indian who promised to escort an expedition to a gold mine up the Orinoco River. The expedition, led by Captain Jobson, returned after two weeks; as it turned out, their guide had deserted them, and they had struggled back. Dudley returned to Trinidad.

On 12 March, Dudley's fleet sailed north, where it finally captured a Spanish merchantman. It then sailed on to Cabo Rojo, in Puerto Rico, waited for suitable prey for some time, and then sailed towards Bermuda. A storm blew the Beare north to near what is now New England before the fleet finally reached the Azores. Low on provisions and working guns, Dudley sailed for home, but he met a Spanish man-of-war on the way. He managed to outmanoeuvre and cripple it in a two-day battle, but decided not to board it. The Beare arrived at St Ives in Cornwall at the end of May 1595, and Dudley heard that Captain Wood had taken three ships.

The next year, 1596, Dudley joined Robert Devereux, 2nd Earl of Essex, to serve as commander of the Nonpareil in an expedition against Cádiz. He was later knighted for his conduct in the capture of Cádiz, although what he did is not recorded. Shortly afterwards he married Alice, daughter of Sir Thomas Leigh of Stoneleigh.

In 1597, Dudley sent Captain Wood on a trading voyage to China with the Beare, the Beare's Whelp and the Benjamin, but they never returned.

== Claiming legitimacy ==
Dudley claimed to have been told in May 1603, by a shadowy adventurer called Thomas Drury, that his parents had been secretly married. He began trying to establish his claim to the earldoms of Leicester and Warwick, as well as to the property of his deceased uncle Ambrose Dudley, including Ambrose's Warwick Castle estates. The case came before the Star Chamber in 1604–1605 and aroused great public interest. Ninety witnesses appeared for Dudley and 57 for the widowed Countess of Leicester, Lettice Knollys. Dudley persuaded, and perhaps pressured, his mother to support his cause. She declared in writing (she did not attend the trial in person) that Leicester had solemnly contracted to marry her in Cannon Row, Westminster, in 1571, and that they were married at Esher, Surrey, "in wintertime" in 1573. Yet all of the 10 putative witnesses ("besides others") to the ceremony were long since dead. Neither could she remember who the "minister" was, nor the exact date of the marriage.

The Star Chamber rejected the evidence and fined several of the witnesses. It was concluded that Sir Robert Dudley had been duped by Drury, who in his turn had sought "his own private gains". King James I ratified the judgement, and it was handed down on 10 May 1605. In 1621, an official investigation in Tuscany, Dudley's new country, concluded that Dudley's "friends maintain that his father married Lady Sheffield, but they are unable to account for her marriage during his lifetime, an act so injurious to the alleged legitimacy of her son." (Note: In the nineteenth century, the question of Sir Robert Dudley's legitimacy was again raised in the House of Lords, but again, it remained unresolved. Historians have had differing views on the problem: While Derek believes in a marriage (Wilson 1981 p. 326), it has been rejected by, for example, Conyers Read (Read 1936 p. 23), Johanna Rickman (Rickman 2008 p. 51), and Simon Adams (Adams 2008b).)

== In Italy ==
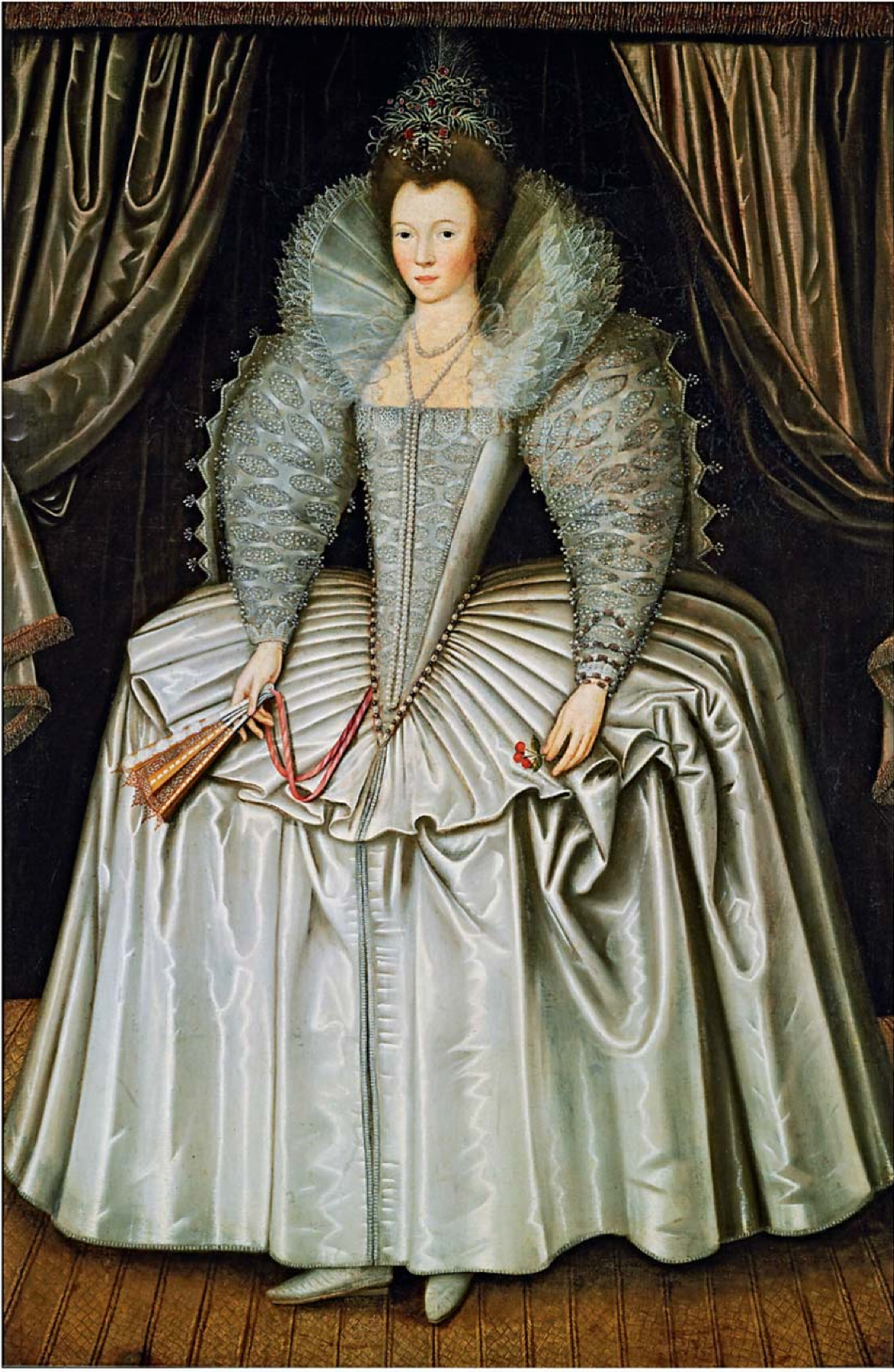
Portrait thought to be Elizabeth Southwell, c. 1600

Dudley left England in July 1605, by Calais. His lover and cousin Elizabeth Southwell accompanied him, cross-dressing as a page. She was a daughter of Sir Robert Southwell and Lady Elizabeth Howard, who was a granddaughter of Charles Howard, 1st Earl of Nottingham, Dudley's uncle. The couple declared that they had converted to Catholicism.

Dudley married Elizabeth Southwell in Lyon in 1606, after they had received a papal dispensation from Pope Paul V because they were blood relatives, and they first settled in Florence. In English law, this marriage was bigamous as he was still married to Lady Alice (a marriage not recognised by the Pope as it had taken place in the Church of England). He began to use his father's title of Earl of Leicester and his uncle's title of Earl of Warwick.

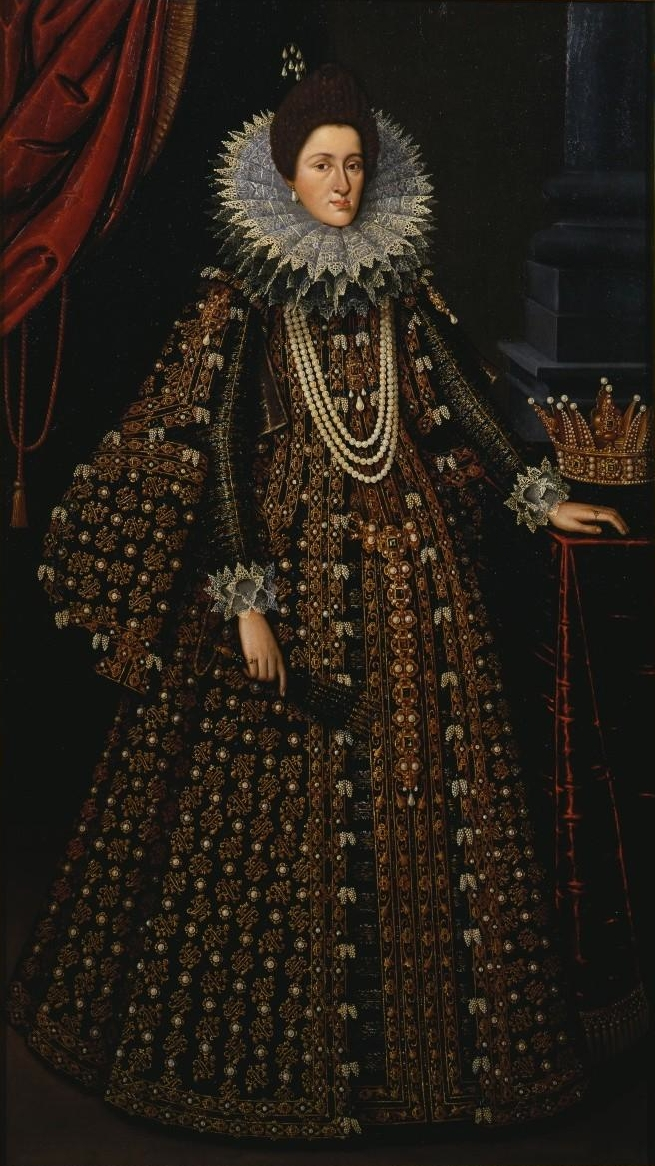
Archduchess Maria Magdalena of Austria, one of Dudley's Medici patrons

Dudley designed and built warships for the arsenal of Livorno and became a naval advisor to Ferdinand I, Grand Duke of Tuscany, of the Medici family. He received an annuity of 2,000 ducats. In 1608, Dudley convinced the Duke to send the privateer galleon Santa Lucia Buonaventura to Guiana and northern Brazil in the only tentative Italian colonization in the Americas, known as the Thornton expedition.

=== Attempts at reconciliation ===
James I revoked Dudley's travel licence in 1607. When he ordered Dudley to return home to provide for his deserted wife and family, Dudley refused. He was then declared an outlaw, and his estate was confiscated. He continued contacts with the English court through Sir Thomas Chaloner, who was now a chamberlain to Henry Frederick, Prince of Wales. He corresponded with the young Prince on the subjects of navigation and shipbuilding, and in 1611 tried to broker a marriage between him and Caterina, daughter of Duke Ferdinand. Meanwhile, Henry Frederick had taken a fancy to Kenilworth Castle, calling it "the most noble and magnificent thing in the midland parts of this realm". Wanting it, he was willing to buy it from Dudley and agreed in 1611 to pay £14,500, with Dudley to hold the office of constable of the castle for his lifetime. When Henry died in 1612, only £3,000 had been paid, and it is unclear whether Dudley ever received it. The new Prince of Wales, Charles, then took possession of the castle but failed to pay the balance owing. In 1621, he got an Act of Parliament allowing Dudley's wife to sell the estate to him for £4,000.

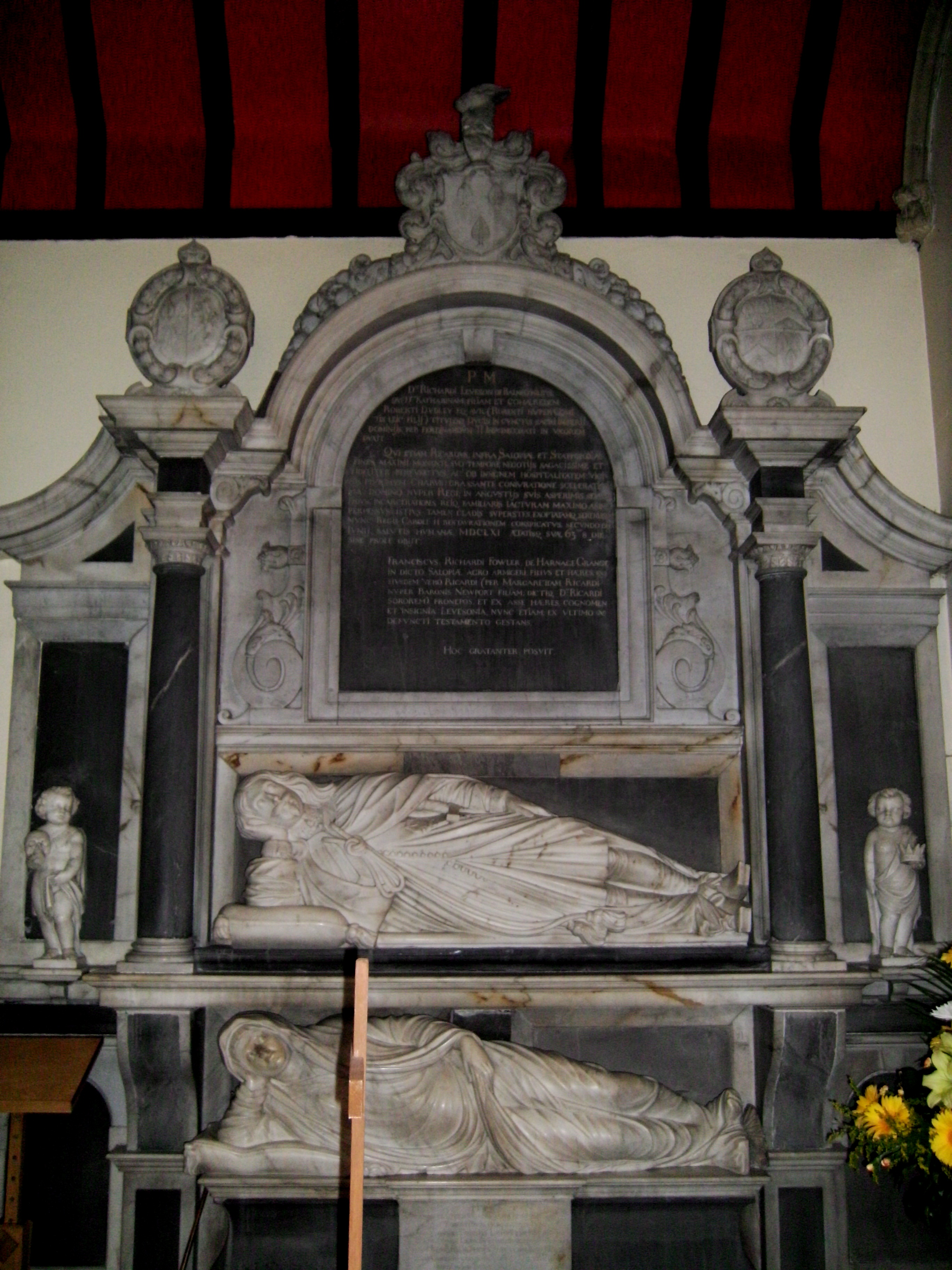
Memorial to Robert Dudley's daughter Katherine Dudley and son-in-law Sir Richard Leveson at Lilleshall, Shropshire.

In 1618, James I granted the Earldoms of Leicester and Warwick to others (respectively Lord Lisle and Lord Rich). In 1620, Dudley convinced Grand Duchess Maria Magdalena, wife of the new duke Cosimo II, to ask her brother, the Emperor Ferdinand II, to recognize his claim to his grandfather's title of Duke of Northumberland. Dudley succeeded on 9 March 1620, and James I severed all negotiations for conciliation.

=== Later years ===
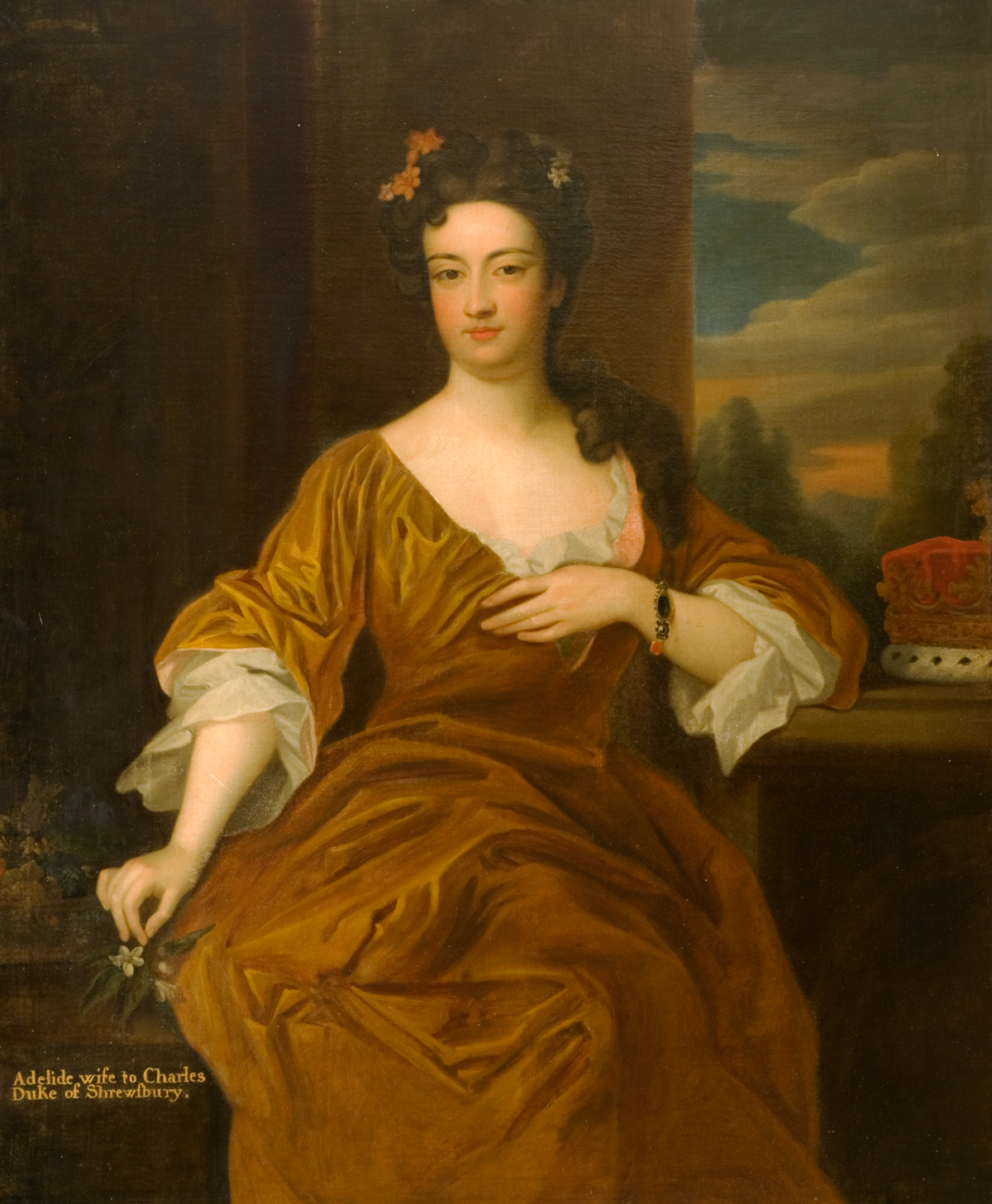
Adelhida Paleotti became wife of Charles Talbot, Duke of Shrewsbury in 1705; granddaughter of Robert Dudley

In addition to shipbuilding, Dudley was busy with many projects in Tuscany, including the Livorno's breakwater and harbour fortifications, draining local swamps, and building a palace in the heart of Florence. He also designed new galleys, and he wrote his memoirs of navigation and seamanship between 1610 and 1620. Later, Dudley incorporated his notes into six volumes of Dell'Arcano del Mare (The Secret of the Sea), self-published in 1646–1647. He also wrote a Maritime Directory as a manual for the Tuscan Navy but it was never published. In 1631, his wife Elizabeth died the day after giving birth to her last child. Several of their 13 children married into the Italian nobility. In 1644, King Charles I created Dudley's second wife Alice Duchess of Dudley for life and recognized Dudley's legitimacy but did not restore his titles and estate. Robert Dudley died on 6 September 1649 outside Florence in Villa Rinieri (now Villa Corsini a Castello). He was buried at San Pancrazio in Florence.

=== Posthumous legal disputes over his titles and estates ===
A son of Dudley was Carlo Dudley, titular Duke of Northumberland who was the father of Maria Cristina Dudley, the second wife of Marquis Andrea Paleotti; they were the parents of Adelhida Paleotti who married Charles Talbot, 1st Duke of Shrewsbury; there was no issue of this marriage. Despite the marriages of Dudley descendants, "No Dudleys in the line male now remained to carry on the name. After the third generation they became extinct in Italy".

In 1660, after the Restoration, Lady Alice, Dudley's second wife (regarded in English law as his legitimate widow), petitioned King Charles II to have her title as Duchess of Northumberland recognised (she had the English title of Duchess of Dudley); and for her daughters, Lady Katherine Leveson and Lady Anne Holborne, to be given the rank and precedence of a duchess's daughters. However, the King kept the title in the gift of the Crown, and bestowed it instead on his illegitimate son, George Fitzroy.

Dudley bequeathed his estate to Ferdinando II de' Medici, Grand Duke of Tuscany. His collection of scientific instruments is on display at the Museo Galileo (Galileo Museum, formerly the Institute and Museum of the History of Science) in Florence.

His grandson Ulderico di Carpegna (son of Teresa Dudley, Duchess of Castiglione del Lago) became in 1685 Prince of the Holy Roman Empire and Sovereign Prince of Scavolino (part of the Sovereign County of Carpegna) and his descendants reigned until 1807 (de jure until 1814).

== Dell'Arcano del Mare ==
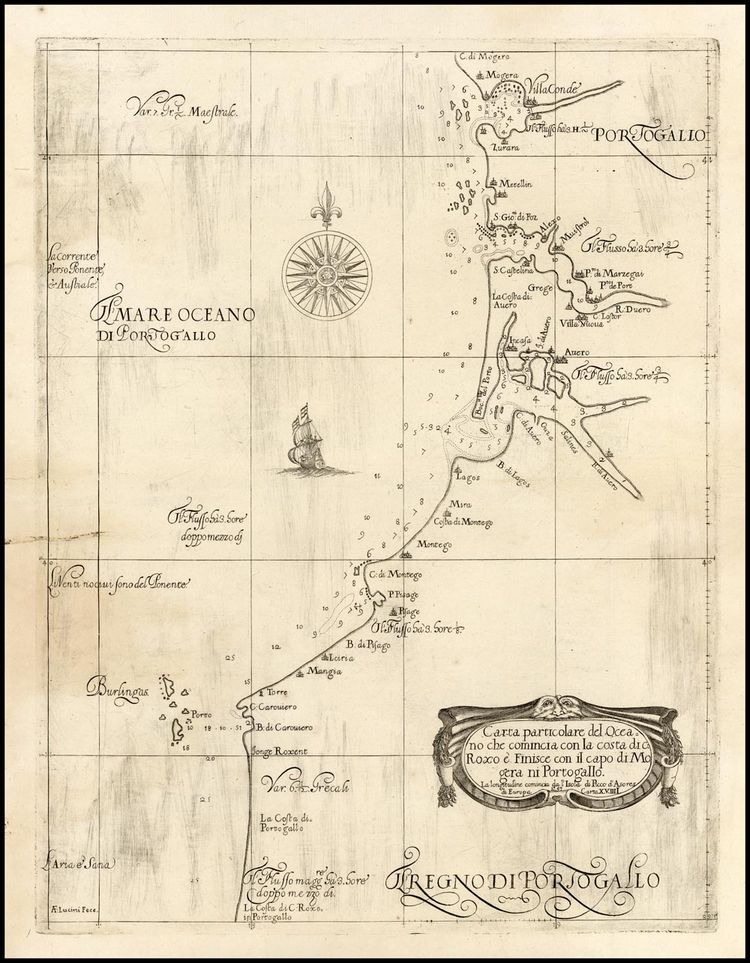
Dell'Arcano del Mare: chart of Portugal

The most important of Dudley's works was Dell'Arcano del Mare (Secrets of the Sea). It includes a comprehensive treatise on navigation and shipbuilding and it has become renowned as the first atlas of sea charts of the world. Dell'Arcano del Mare consists of six known volumes that illustrate Dudley's knowledge of navigation, shipbuilding and astronomy and it includes 130 original maps, all his own creations and not copied from existing maps, which was unusual for the period. Originally published at Florence in 1646 in Italian, they represent a collection of all contemporary naval knowledge. The atlas also includes a proposal for the construction of a fleet of five rates (sizes) of ships, which Dudley had designed and described. Dell'Arcano del Mare was reprinted in Florence in 1661 without the charts of the first edition. The distinctive character of Dudley's charts was an early use of Mercator projection.
