= Satellite-derived bathymetry =

Bathymetry mapping

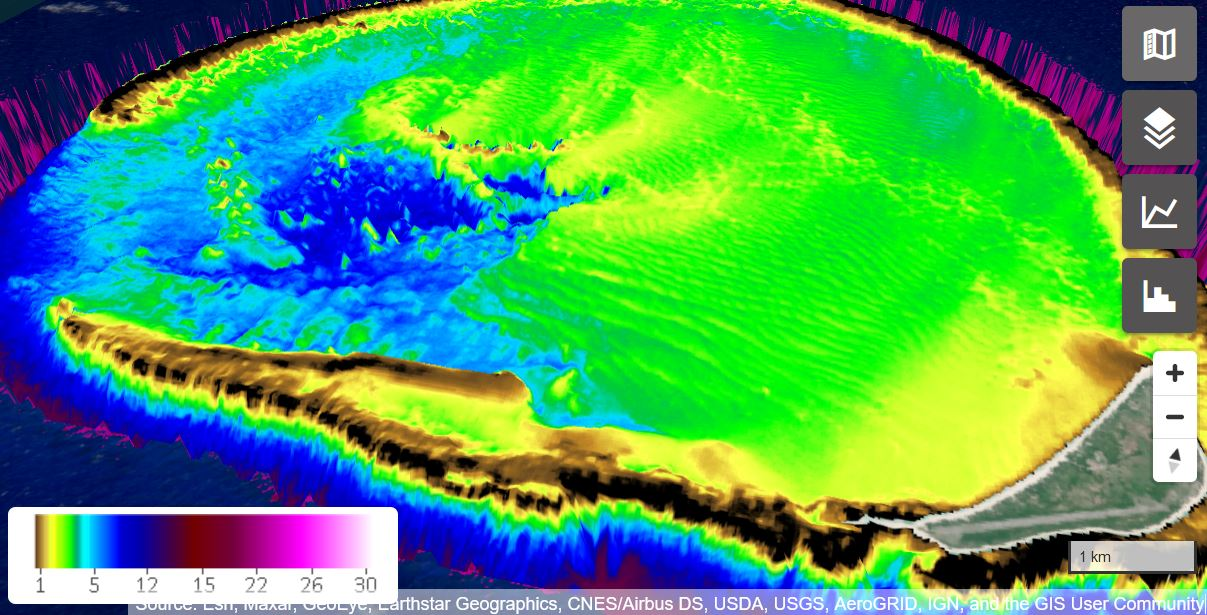
Satellite-derived bathymetry model for the Midway Islands USA. The bathymetric data have been created and visualised with SDB-Online webapp.

Satellite-derived bathymetry (SDB) is the calculation of shallow water depth from active or passive satellite imaging sensors. The technology requires a sensor (hardware) and relevant algorithms (software) to derive bathymetric measurements from the data recorded by the sensor.

== Methods ==
SDB methods can provide bathymetric data with varying spatial resolution, depending on the analysis method and its underlying physics. The most common methods for coastal and very high resolution (1 to 30 meters) bathymetric data are based on multispectral satellite sensors and the analytical inversion of the radiative transfer equation - often referred to as physical SDB methods or empirical approaches. Other approaches rely on photogrammetry or visual image interpretation.

Moderate resolution bathymetric data (50 several 100 meters of spatial resolution) use multispectral or synthetic aperture radar satellite data and generate bathymetric information by the inversion of the wave dispersion equation

The International Hydrographic Organisation IHO operates a project team on Satellite-derived bathymetry supporting the Hydrographic Surveys Working Group. It has published the B-13 IHO publication on Guidelines for Satellite-derived bathymetry which provides more detailed information on each method.

== Applications ==
In contrast to other bathymetric survey methods, such as ship-based echo sounding or airborne lidar bathymetry surveys, advanced Satellite-derived bathymetry methods can be used to map the seabed morphology without physically being on-site. The frequent revisit times of satellites and historical data archives also allow a continuous environmental monitoring of the shallow water zone. Therefore, Satellite-derived bathymetry finds uptake in applications which require to map and monitor shallow waters, which might be not accessible or cover significant geographical areas and support charting in those areas. SDB data are part of the European harmonized bathymetry grid EMODnet bathymetry, and as such integrated into the General Bathymetric Chart of the Ocean.

Software tools for the creation of Satellite-derived bathymetry range from desktop-based cookbook solutions up to web-based software solutions
