= Anton Francesco Lucini =

Italian engraver and printmaker

Anton Francesco Lucini (1610 – after 1661) was an Italian engraver and printmaker, best known for his etchings of the work Dell'Arcano del Mare by Sir Robert Dudley.

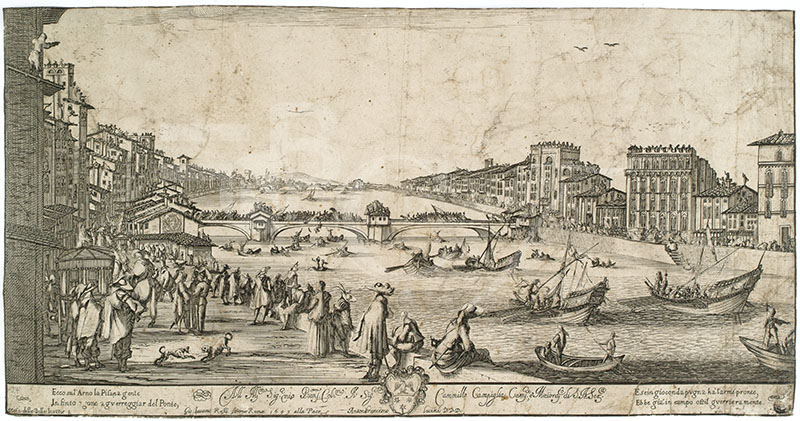
View of Pisa during the bridge game, engraving by Anton Francesco Lucini, drawing by Stefano della Bella (Rome, 1649)

Lucini was born at Florence and he studied etching under Stefano della Bella and Jacques Callot, who had lived in Florence 1612–1621, and whose prints imparted a strong influence to Florentine printmakers.

Lucini worked at a series of engravings entitled Disegni della guerra, assedio dell'armata turchesca all'Isola di Malta l'anno MDXLV published in Bologna (1631). Then he worked at the monumental work Dell'arcano del mare by Sir Robert Dudley published in Florence 1646–1647. The distinctive Baroque style of Dudley's charts is attributable to the elegant engraving of Antonio Francesco Lucini, who stated that he spent 12 years and used 5,000 pounds of copper to produce the plates of exceptional quality.
