= Bathymetric chart =

Map depicting the submerged terrain of bodies of water

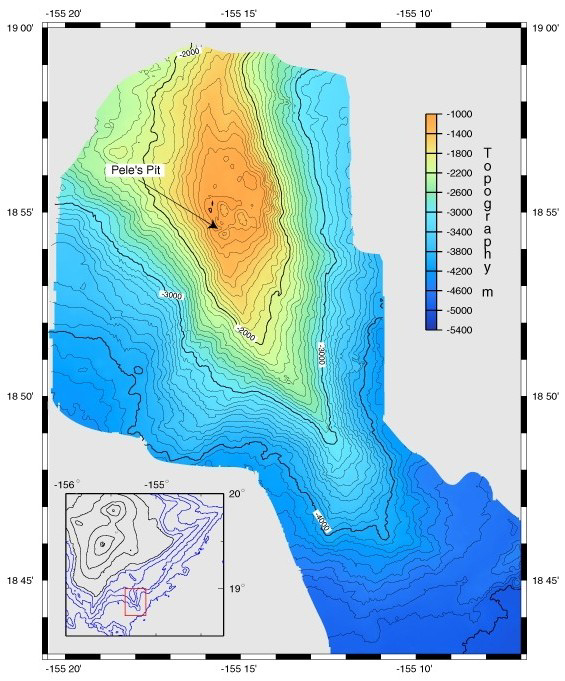
Bathymetric map of Kamaʻehuakanaloa Seamount (formerly Loihi) with isobaths

A bathymetric chart is a type of isarithmic map that depicts the submerged bathymetry and physiographic features of ocean and sea bottoms. Their primary purpose is to provide detailed depth contours of ocean topography as well as provide the size, shape and distribution of underwater features.

Topographic maps display elevation above ground (topography) and are complementary to bathymetric charts. Bathymetric charts showcase depth using a series of lines and points at equal intervals, called depth contours or isobaths (a type of contour line). A closed shape with increasingly smaller shapes inside of it can indicate an ocean trench or a seamount, or underwater mountain, depending on whether the depths increase or decrease going inward.

Bathymetric surveys and charts are associated with the science of oceanography, particularly marine geology, and underwater engineering or other specialized purposes.

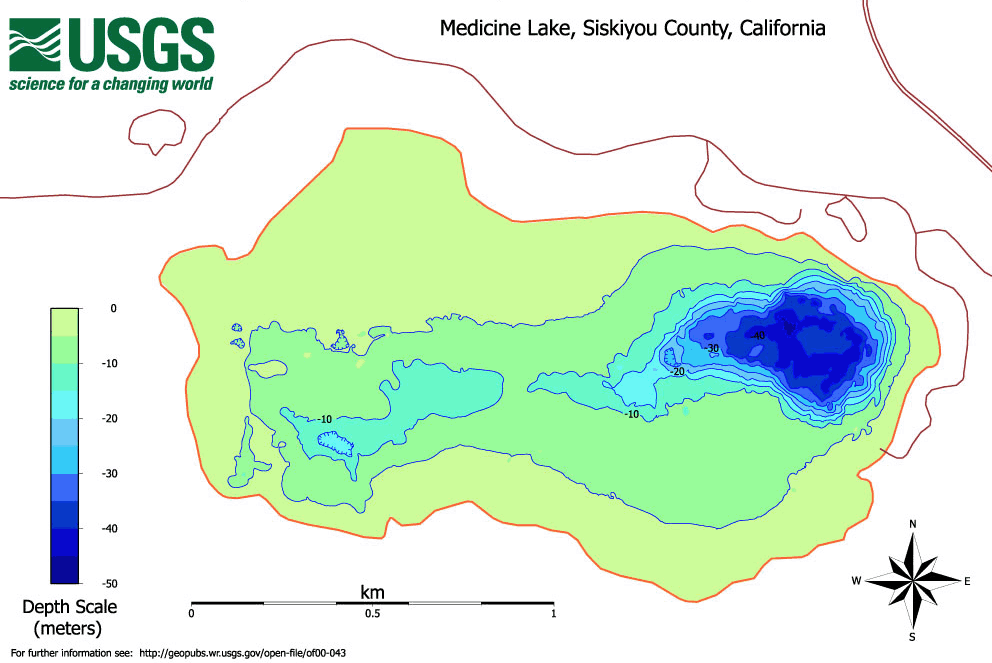
Bathymetric map of Medicine Lake, California

Bathymetric data used to produce charts can also be converted to bathymetric profiles which are vertical sections through a feature.

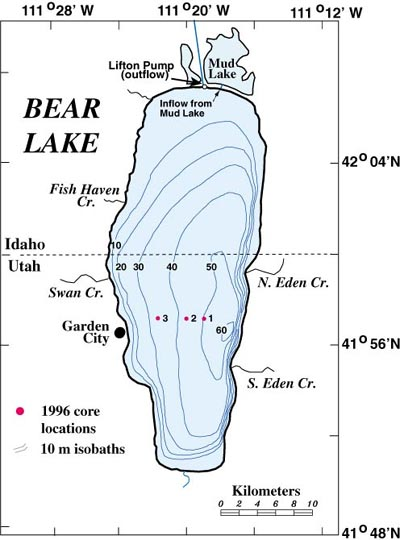
Bathymetric chart of Bear Lake

== History ==
=== Ancient Egypt ===
The use of bathymetry and the development of bathymetric charts dates back around the 19th century BC to ancient Egypt. Depictions on tomb walls such as the bas-relief carvings of Deir al-Bahri commissioned by Queen Hatshepsut in the 16th century BC show ancient mariners using long slender poles as sounding poles to determine the depth of the Nile River and into the Nile River Delta.

=== Ancient Greece ===
The first written account and mapped records of sounding did not occur until 1000 years after the Egyptians had begun sounding and mapping the Nile. The Greek historian Herodotus writes of a sounding in 66 feet of water of the mouth of the Nile in the river delta. He writes of yellow mud being brought up similar to the same that was deposited with the yearly floods. These accounts show a heightened awareness of regional depths and seafloor characteristics among ancient mariners and demonstrate that discoveries in bathymetry and the use of bathymetric charts had progressed significantly.

=== Ancient Rome ===
The New Testament recounts soundings being taken with the shipwreck of Paul on the island of Malta in the Book of Acts. Chapter 27, verses 27-44 recount the experience:

27 "...as we were driven up and down in Adria, about midnight the shipmen deemed that they drew near to some country;"

28 "And sounded, and found it twenty fathoms: and when they had gone a little further, they sounded again, and found it fifteen fathoms."

29 "Then fearing lest we should have fallen upon rocks, they cast four anchors out of the stern..."

39 "And when it was day, they knew not the land..."

40 "And when they had taken up the anchors, they committed themselves unto the sea . . . and made toward shore."

41 And falling into a place where two seas met, they ran the ship aground; and the forepart stuck fast, and remained unmoveable, but the hinder part was broken with the violence of the waves.

Verse 39 states that "they knew not the land" indicating that their knowledge of sea was obtained from the experiences of others as well as the memory of having been there before. Sailing directions called a periplus did exist by the First Century A.D. giving general coastal configurations. Commercially available charts of the depths of the sea and surrounding coast would not be available for almost another thousand years.

=== Early modern period ===
Up to this point, bathymetric charts were rare as mariners continued to rely on heavy ropes and lead weights to take depth readings and chart the open ocean. Minor advances in the surveying and depth charting of the oceans occurred in the 200 years since Columbus sailed to the Americas. In 1647, Robert Dudley published the atlas, 'Dell'Arcano del Mare' (Secrets of the Sea). His work far outpaced anything that had been published previously with maps and charts constructed in the Mercator projection as well as containing some of the first charts to show printed depths on the North American Atlantic Seaboard. His publication provided the groundwork for future mariners and inventors to continue to develop new and inventive ways to produce high quality charts and surveys of the world's lakes and oceans.

== Comparison with hydrographic chart ==
A bathymetric chart differs from a hydrographic chart in that accurate presentation of the underwater features is the goal, while safe navigation is the requirement for the hydrographic chart.

A hydrographic chart will obscure the actual features to present a simplified version to help mariners avoid underwater hazards.

== Joining a bathymetric chart and topographic map ==
In an ideal case, the joining of a bathymetric chart and topographic map of the same scale and projection of the same geographic area would be seamless. The only difference would be that the values begin increasing after crossing the zero at the designated sea level datum. Thus the topographic map's mountains have the greatest values while the bathymetric chart's greatest depths have the greatest values.

Simply put, the bathymetric chart is intended to show the land if overlying waters were removed in exactly the same manner as the topographic map.

== Within hydrography ==
Bathymetric surveys are a subset of the science of hydrography. They differ slightly from the surveys required to create the product of hydrography in its more limited application and as conducted by the national and international agencies tasked with producing charts and publications for safe navigation. That chart product is more accurately termed a navigation or hydrographic chart with a strong bias toward the presentation of essential safety information.

== Bathymetric surveys ==
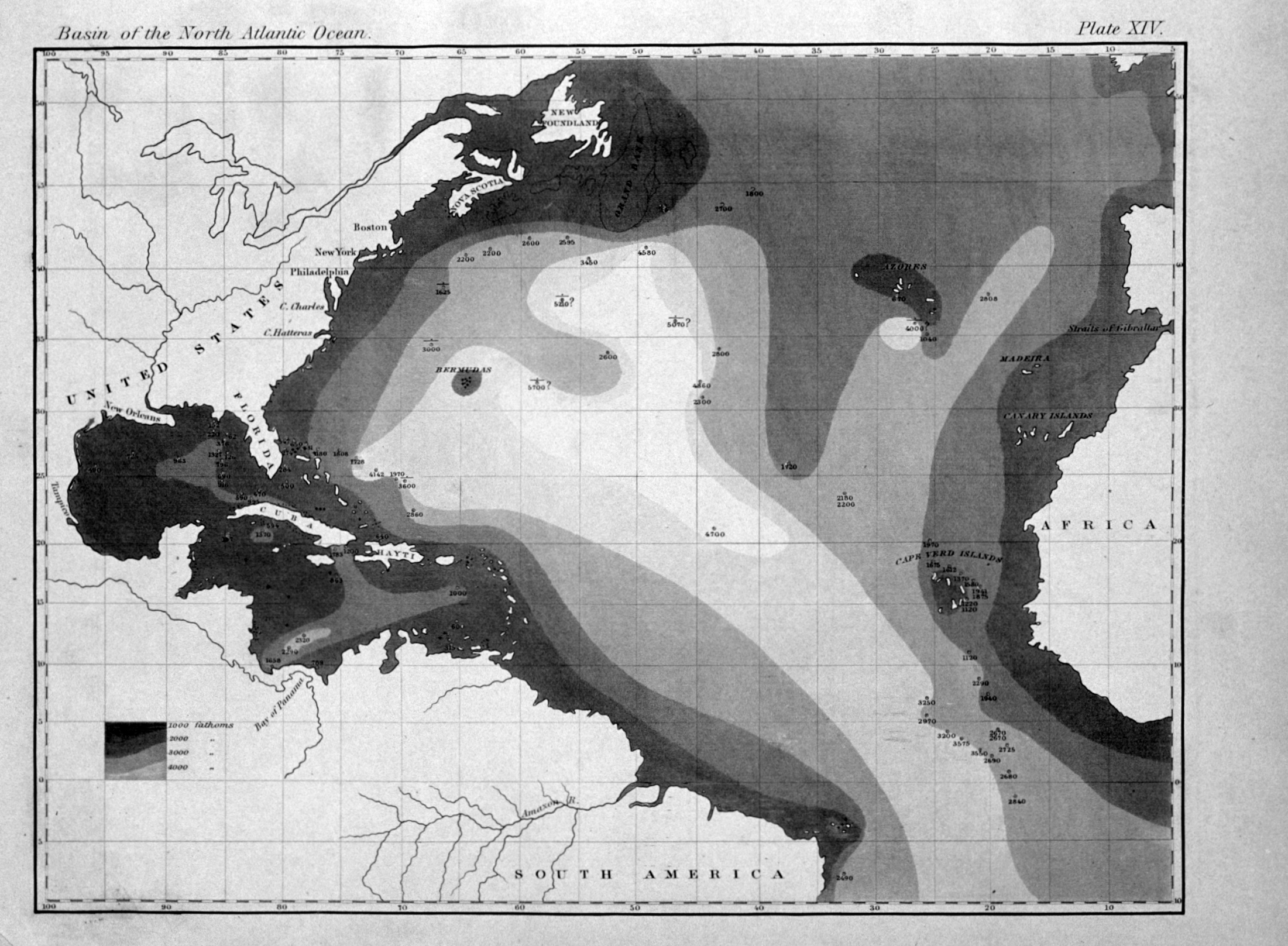
First printed map of oceanic bathymetry, published by Matthew Fontaine Maury with data from USS Dolphin (1853)

Originally, bathymetry involved the measurement of ocean depth through depth sounding. Early techniques used pre-measured heavy rope or cable lowered over a ship's side. This technique measures the depth at one point at a time, and is therefore less efficient than other methods. It is also subject to movements of the ship and currents moving the line out of true, and thus is also less accurate.

The data used to make bathymetric maps today typically comes from an echosounder (sonar) mounted beneath or over the side of a boat, "pinging" a beam of sound downward at the seafloor or from remote sensing LIDAR or LADAR systems. The amount of time it takes for the sound or light to travel through the water, bounce off the seafloor, and return to the sounder informs the equipment of the distance to the seafloor. LIDAR/LADAR surveys are usually conducted by airborne systems.

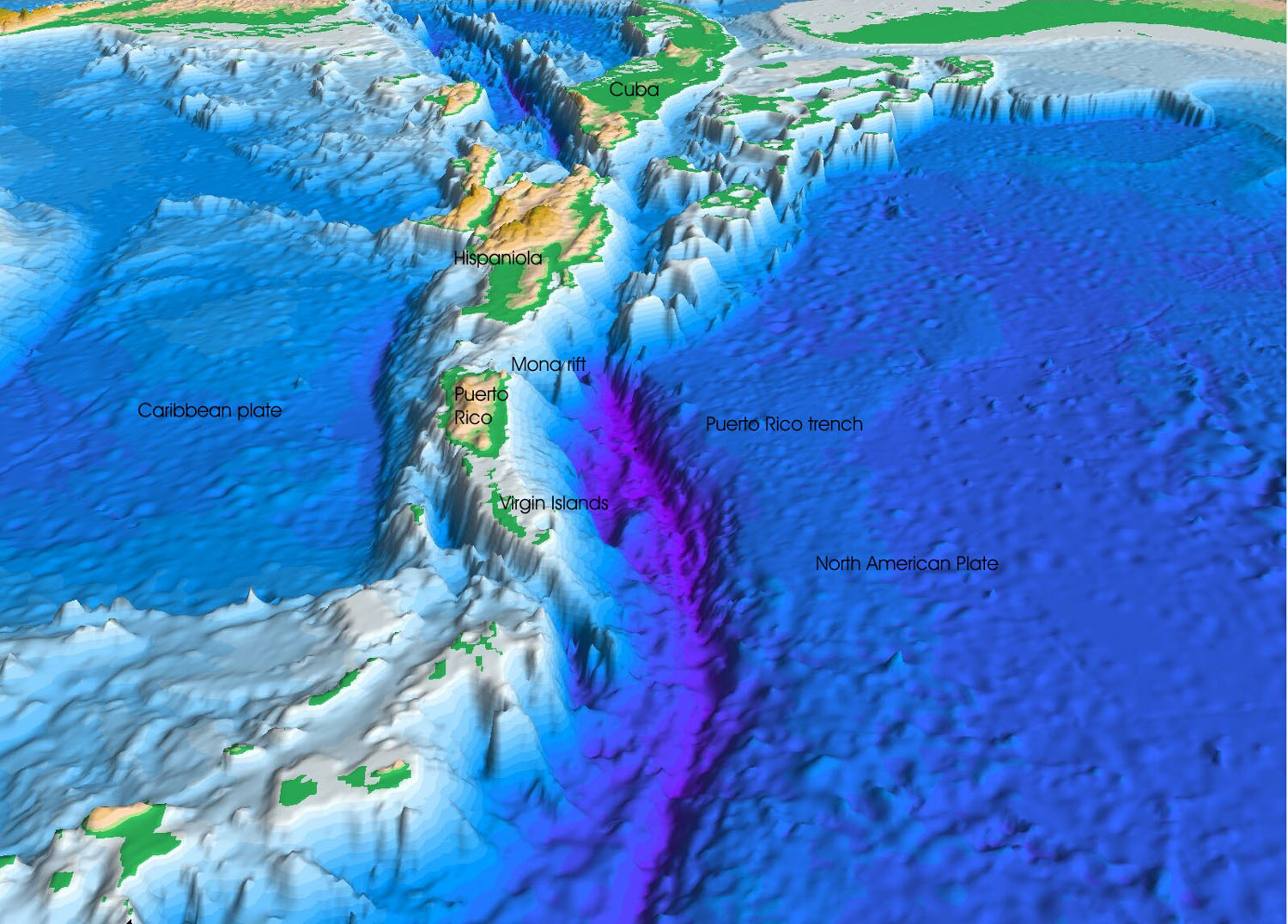
The seafloor topography near the Puerto Rico Trench

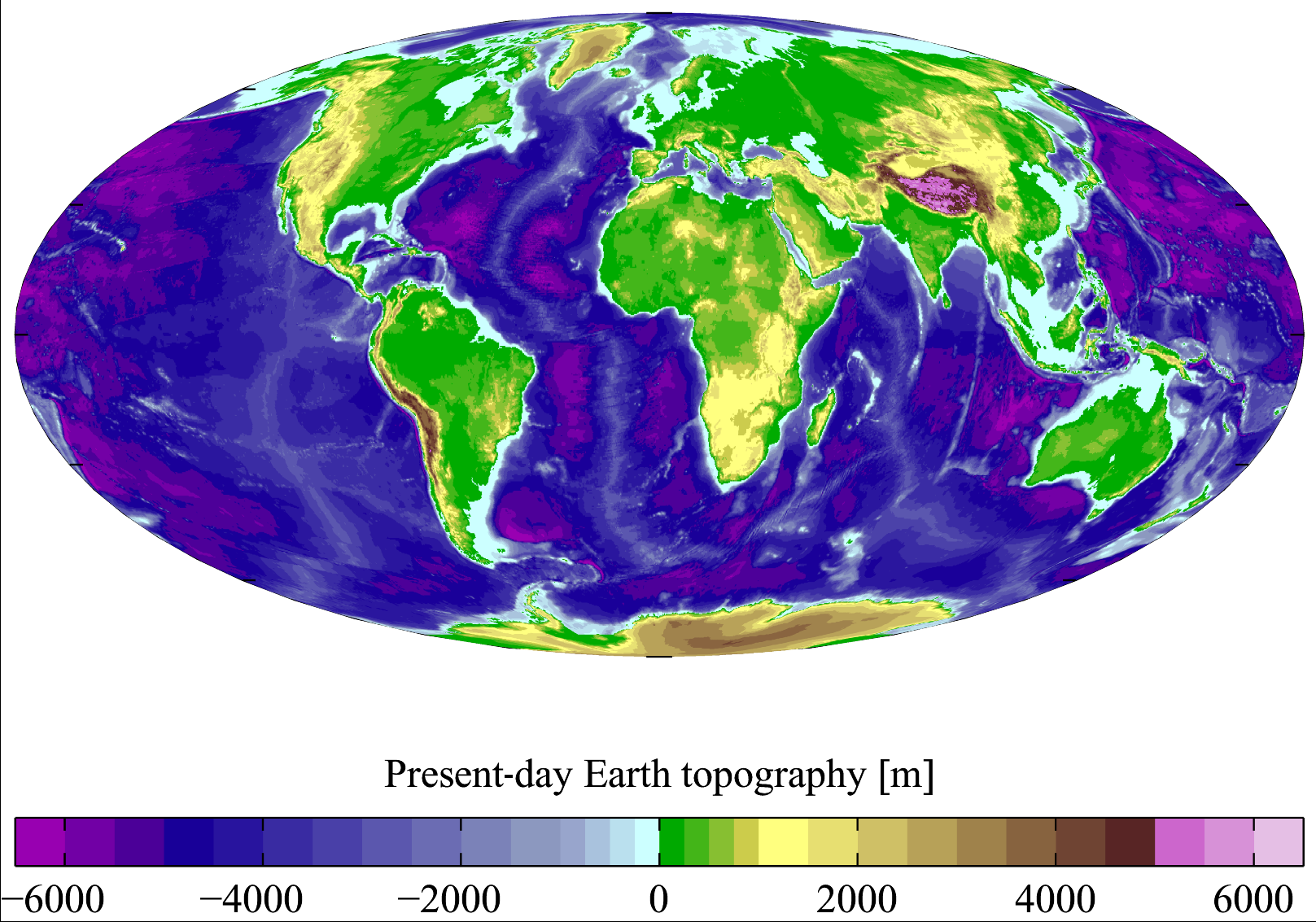
Present-day Earth bathymetry (and altimetry). Data from the National Centers for Environmental Information's TerrainBase Digital Terrain Model.

Starting in the early 1930s, single-beam sounders were used to make bathymetry maps. Today, multibeam echosounders (MBES) are typically used, which use hundreds of very narrow adjacent beams (typically 256) arranged in a fan-like swath of typically 90 to 170 degrees across. The tightly packed array of narrow individual beams provides very high angular resolution and accuracy. In general, a wide swath, which is depth dependent, allows a boat to map more seafloor in less time than a single-beam echosounder by making fewer passes. The beams update many times per second (typically 0.1–50 Hz depending on water depth), allowing faster boat speed while maintaining 100% coverage of the seafloor. Attitude sensors allow for the correction of the boat's roll and pitch on the ocean surface, and a gyrocompass provides accurate heading information to correct for vessel yaw. (Most modern MBES systems use an integrated motion-sensor and position system that measures yaw as well as the other dynamics and position.) A satellite-based global navigation system positions the soundings with respect to the surface of the earth. Sound speed profiles (speed of sound in water as a function of depth) of the water column correct for refraction or "ray-bending" of the sound waves owing to non-uniform water column characteristics such as temperature, conductivity, and pressure. A computer system processes all the data, correcting for all of the above factors as well as for the angle of each individual beam. The resulting sounding measurements are then processed either manually, semi-automatically or automatically (in limited circumstances) to produce a map of the area. As of 2010 a number of different outputs are generated, including a sub-set of the original measurements that satisfy some conditions (e.g., most representative likely soundings, shallowest in a region, etc.) or integrated digital terrain models (DTM) (e.g., a regular or irregular grid of points connected into a surface). Historically, selection of measurements was more common in hydrographic applications while DTM construction was used for engineering surveys, geology, flow modeling, etc. Since c. 2003–2005, DTMs have become more accepted in hydrographic practice.

Satellites are also used to measure bathymetry. Satellite radar maps deep-sea topography by detecting the subtle variations in sea level caused by the gravitational pull of undersea mountains, ridges, and other masses. On average, sea level is higher over mountains and ridges than over abyssal plains and trenches.

In the United States the United States Army Corps of Engineers performs or commissions most surveys of navigable inland waterways, while the National Oceanic and Atmospheric Administration (NOAA) performs the same role for ocean waterways. Coastal bathymetry data is available from NOAA's National Geophysical Data Center (NGDC), which is now merged into National Centers for Environmental Information. Bathymetric data is usually referenced to tidal vertical datums. For deep-water bathymetry, this is typically Mean Sea Level (MSL), but most data used for nautical charting is referenced to Mean Lower Low Water (MLLW) in American surveys, and Lowest Astronomical Tide (LAT) in other countries. Many other datums are used in practice, depending on the locality and tidal regime.

Occupations or careers related to bathymetry include the study of oceans and rocks and minerals on the ocean floor, and the study of underwater earthquakes or volcanoes. The taking and analysis of bathymetric measurements is one of the core areas of modern hydrography, and a fundamental component in ensuring the safe transport of goods worldwide.

STL 3D model of Earth without liquid water with 20× elevation exaggeration

== See also ==
- Hydrographic/nautical chart – Topographic map of a maritime area and adjacent coastal regions
- General Bathymetric Chart of the Oceans – Publicly available bathymetric chart of the world's oceans
- List of map projections
