= Alice Dudley, Duchess of Dudley =

Alice Dudley, Duchess of Dudley (née Leigh; 1579 – 22 January 1669), also known as Duchess Dudley, was the second wife of the explorer Sir Robert Dudley. In 1605, after giving birth to seven daughters, she was abandoned by her husband, who went into exile in Tuscany, remarried, and eventually sold his English estates. In 1644, by way of reparation for her losses, King Charles I created Alice Dudley a duchess in her own right "for her natural life", the dukedom thus created not being heritable.

== Background and marriage ==
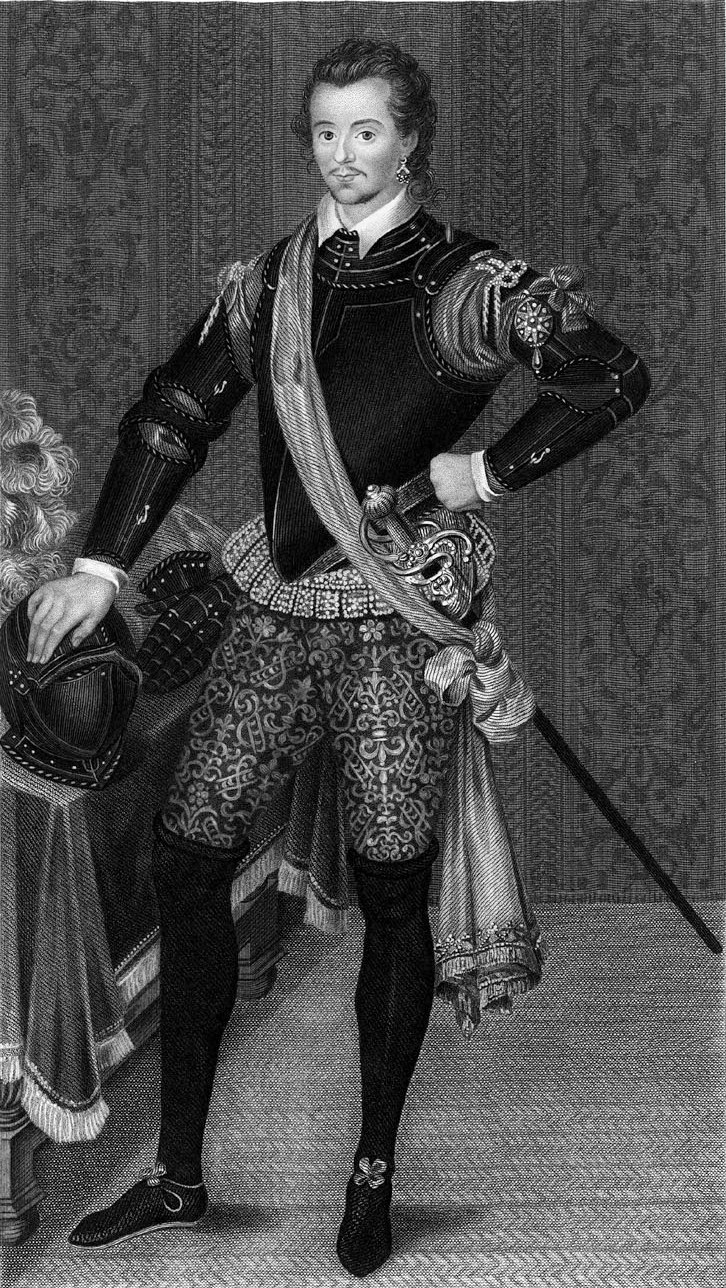
Robert Dudley, the Duchess of Dudley's husband

Alice Leigh was a daughter of Sir Thomas Leigh, 1st Baronet (died 1625), of Stoneleigh Abbey, Warwickshire, who was created a baronet in 1611, by his marriage to Catherine, a daughter of Sir John Spencer of Wormleighton.

Her father was the third son of Sir Thomas Leigh and his wife Alice née Barker (an heiress of Sir Rowland Hill) who was Lord Mayor of London for 1549/50.

In 1643 her nephew Thomas (1595–1672) was created the first Baron Leigh. On 11 September 1596, at Ashow, Warwickshire, Alice Leigh married Sir Robert Dudley, the natural son of Robert Dudley, 1st Earl of Leicester, Queen Elizabeth I's favourite, by Lady Sheffield. A daughter of this marriage, who was to be the first of seven, was baptised on 25 September 1597. Five of their daughters reached adulthood: Alice (who married Sir Ferdinando Sutton), Douglas (who married William Dansey), Katherine (who married Sir Richard Leveson), Frances (who married Sir Gilbert Kniveton), and Anne (who married Sir Robert Holborne).

In 1605, Robert Dudley left England and fled to Florence, accompanied by his first cousin once removed, Elizabeth Southwell. That winter, he and Southwell announced their conversion to Roman Catholicism and intention to marry. To repudiate his existing marriage, Robert claimed that in 1591 he had entered into a marriage contract with Frances Vavasour, one of Queen Elizabeth's maids of honour. His third marriage was never recognised in England.

Robert Dudley owned estates which included Kenilworth Castle which were valued at £50,000. In 1612, these were sold for £14,500 to Henry Frederick, Prince of Wales, although he paid only a fraction of even that price, and after his death the property devolved upon the new Prince of Wales, the future King Charles. In 1622 Charles obtained a special act of parliament to enable Alice Dudley "to alien her estate from her children as a feme sole", so that she could then sell her interest in the properties for £4,000, plus further payments to be made in later years.

== Duchess of Dudley ==
By letters patent of 23 May 1644, King Charles I created Dudley a duchess for her own life. This creation was plainly stated to be prompted by the King's having considered the Star Chamber case of 1605, in which Dudley's husband had claimed to be his father's legitimate son, and Charles believing the verdict which had denied the legitimacy of the claim, to be incorrect; and by way of an apology for the failure of the King's deceased brother Henry to pay Dudley the true value of his estates and the Crown's failure to make further payments promised to Dudley herself; and also by way of a reward to two of Dudley's sons-in-law who were notable royalists, Sir Robert Holborne, attorney-general to the Prince of Wales, and Sir Richard Leveson, a member for Newcastle-under-Lyme in the Long Parliament.

In the King's grant to Dudley of the new title and precedency, with the additional precedency of the children of a duke, given to her daughters, at Oxford in the midst of the turmoil of the First English Civil War, it declared

And whereas, our father not knowing the truth of the lawful birth of the said Sir Robert (as we piously believe) granted away the titles of the said earldom to others ... and holding ourselves in honour and conscience obliged to make reparation; and also the said great estate which the Lady Alice had in Kenilworth, and sold at our desire to us at a very great undervalue... we do... give and grant unto the said Lady Alice Dudley the title of Duchess of Dudley for life.

== Widowhood and legacy ==
Dudley was finally widowed in 1649, her husband dying at his villa near Florence after more than forty years in exile. She was recorded as a generous benefactor to the parish of St Giles-in-the-Fields, Middlesex, then outside London. After its medieval church had fallen into decay, a fine new Gothic building was built in brick between 1623 and 1630, mostly paid for by the future Duchess. She died at her house near the church on 22 January 1669, having outlived all her daughters but Lady Katherine Leveson. In her will, she left an endowment to generate annually "the sum of One hundred pounds for ever, for the redemption of poor English captives taken by the Turks", and King Charles II instructed Sir Orlando Bridgeman, the Lord Keeper of the Great Seal, to take steps to give effect to the bequest. She also left a gift of plate and carpet for St Mary's Church, Acton.
