= Charles Talbot, 1st Duke of Shrewsbury =

British statesman (1660–1718)

His Grace The Duke of Shrewsbury KG PC
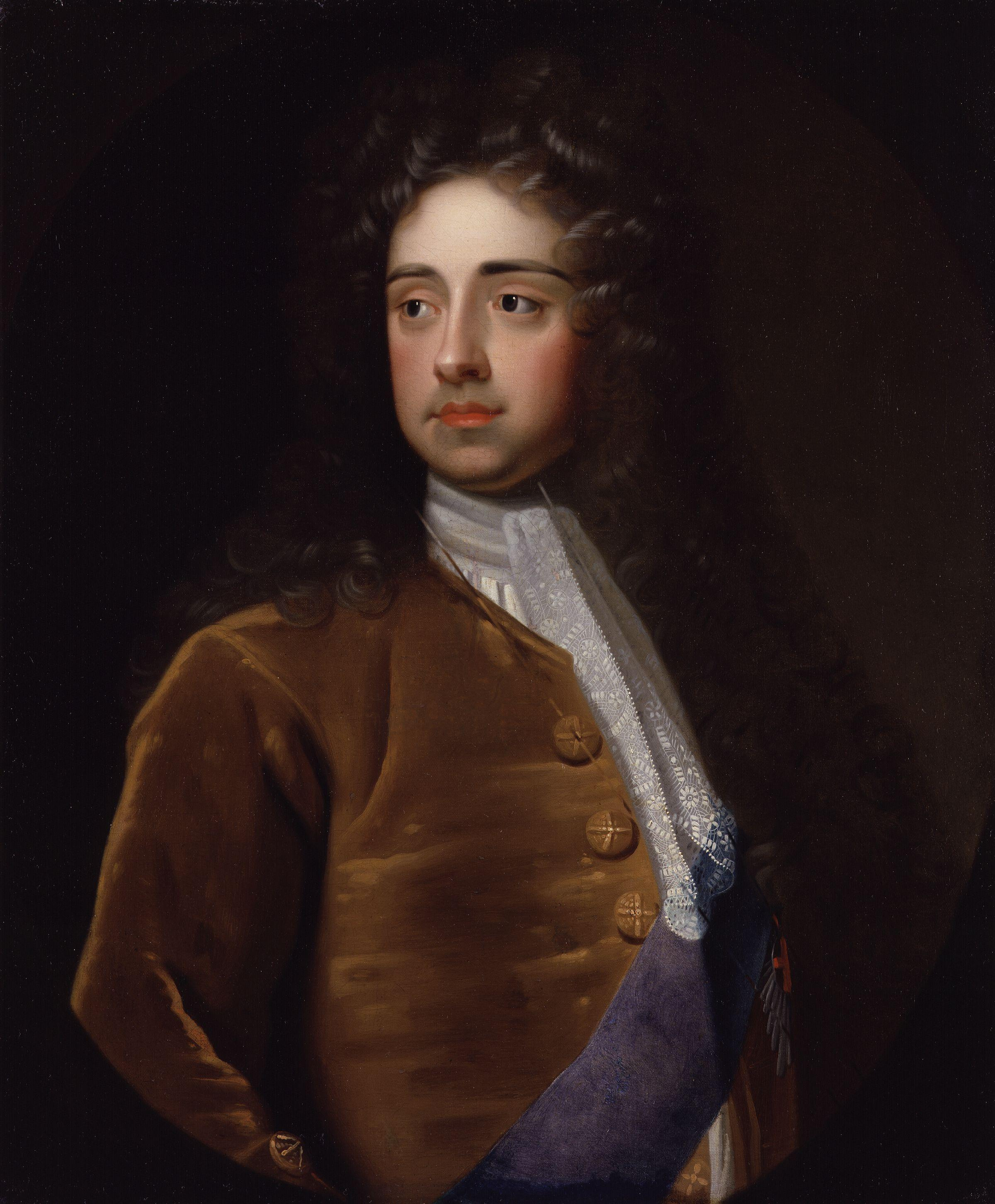
- Portrait by Sir Godfrey Kneller, c. 1699–1700

Chief Minister of Great Britain Lord High Treasurer
- In office 30 July 1714 – 13 October 1714
- Monarchs: Anne; George I
- Preceded by: The Earl of Oxford and Earl Mortimer
- Succeeded by: The Earl of Halifax as First Lord of the Treasury in Commission

Lord Chamberlain
- In office 1710–1715
- Monarchs: Anne; George I
- Preceded by: The Marquess of Kent
- Succeeded by: The Duke of Bolton
- In office 1699–1700
- Monarch: Anne
- Preceded by: The Earl of Sunderland (Note: King William III did not accept Sunderland’s resignation until 1699, but from 1697 to 1699 the office remained effectively vacant.)
- Succeeded by: The Earl of Jersey

Lord Lieutenant of Ireland
- In office 22 September 1713 – 21 September 1714
- Monarchs: Anne; George I
- Preceded by: The Duke of Ormonde
- Succeeded by: The Earl of Sunderland

Secretary of State for the Southern Department
- In office 27 April 1695 – 12 December 1698
- Monarchs: William III and Mary II
- Preceded by: John Trenchard
- Succeeded by: James Vernon
- In office 14 February 1689 – 2 June 1690
- Monarchs: William III and Mary II
- Preceded by: The Earl of Middleton
- Succeeded by: The Earl of Nottingham

Secretary of State for the Northern Department
- In office 2 March 1694 – 3 May 1695
- Monarchs: William III and Mary II
- Preceded by: John Trenchard
- Succeeded by: William Trumbull

Personal details
- Born: Charles Talbot; 15 July 1660
- Died: 1 February 1718 (aged 57) Warwick House, Charing Cross, London, England, Kingdom of Great Britain
- Spouse: Adelhida Paleotti
- Parent(s): 11th Earl of Shrewsbury; Anna Maria Brudenell

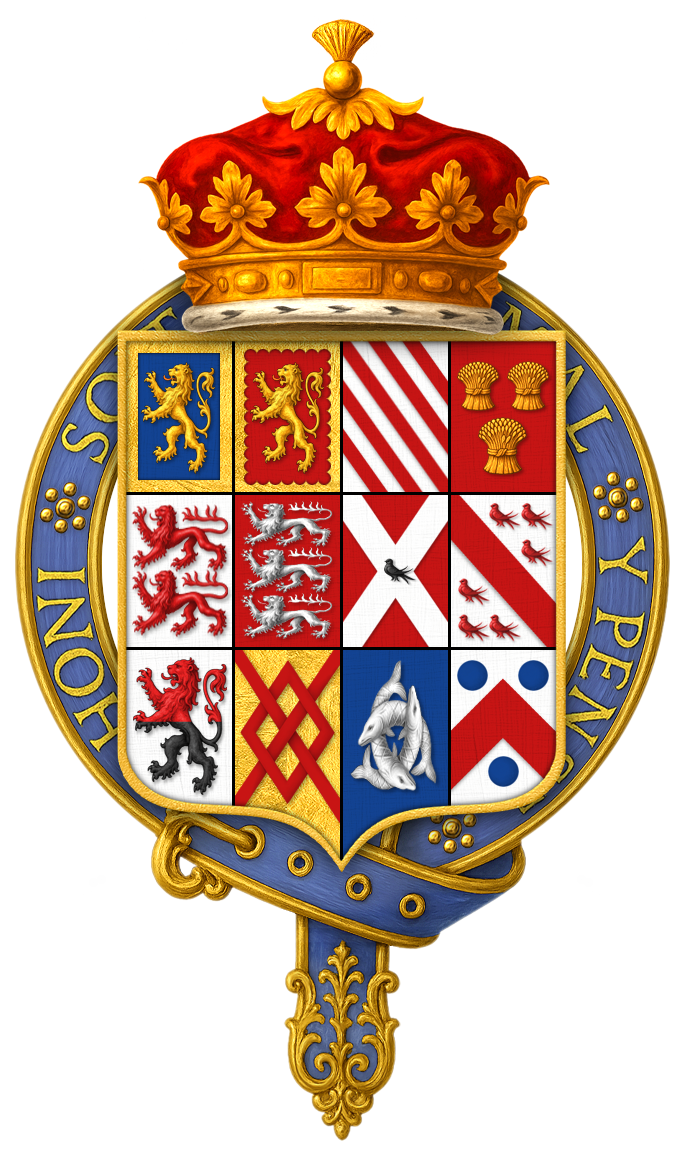
Coat of arms of Charles Talbot, 1st Duke of Shrewsbury, KG

Charles Talbot, 1st Duke of Shrewsbury (15 July 1660 – 1 February 1718) was a British Whig statesman who was part of the Immortal Seven group that invited William of Orange to depose King James II of England during the Glorious Revolution. Born to Roman Catholic parents, he remained in that faith until 1679 when—during the time of the Popish Plot and following the advice of the divine John Tillotson—he converted to the Church of England. He was appointed to several minor roles before the revolution, but came to prominence as a member of William's government, under whom he served as Secretary of State in the 1690s.

From 1700 until 1705, Shrewsbury was in self-imposed exile abroad, during which he married Countess Adelhida Paleotti. After his return to England he avoided politics until April 1710, when he was appointed Lord Chamberlain and joined the Tory government of Robert Harley, the Earl of Oxford. In November 1712 he was appointed ambassador to France and then Lord Lieutenant of Ireland, returning to England in June 1714.

In July of 1714 Shrewsbury was appointed Lord Treasurer but in August Queen Anne died and George I succeeded her. The new Whig regime opposed Shrewsbury remaining in government and by 1715 he had lost all his governmental offices, although until his death he remained George's Groom of the Stool, and he opposed Whig policies. He died in 1718.

== Early life and family ==
He was the only son of the 11th Earl of Shrewsbury and his second wife, formerly Anna Maria Brudenell, a daughter of the 2nd Earl of Cardigan. His mother became the notorious mistress of the 2nd Duke of Buckingham, who killed her husband in a duel in 1668. On his father's death Charles succeeded to the Earldom of Shrewsbury. It has been argued that the traumatic events of his early childhood left a permanent mark on him.

Talbot was a godson of King Charles II, after whom he was named, and he was brought up as a Roman Catholic, but after the scandal of his father's death, he was placed in the care of Protestant relatives: the earl of Cardigan (the new earl's grandfather); the Hon. Mervyn Tuchett, later earl of Castlehaven (d. 1686), his uncle through marriage to Mary Talbot, the daughter of the tenth earl of Shrewsbury; William Talbot (d. 1686) of Whittington (a kinsman: the uncle of Sir John Talbot of Lacock and father of the bishop of Oxford); and Gilbert Crouch (the family lawyer). From 1674 to 1678, Shrewsbury studied in Paris. In the Spring of 1678 he joined the troops of James, duke of York, in preparation for an Anglo-French war; when this failed to manifest, he returned to England in June. In 1679, under the influence of John Tillotson, he became a member of the Church of England.

== Under Charles II and James II ==
Shrewsbury was summoned to the House of Lords in 1680 and three years later was appointed Gentleman-Extraordinary of the Bedchamber, suggesting he was in favour at the court of Charles II. With the accession in 1685 of James II, Shrewsbury was appointed a captain and then colonel in order to defeat the Monmouth Rebellion, but he resigned his commission in January 1687 after refusing to bow to pressure from James to convert back to the Catholic faith. In that year he entered in correspondence with the Prince of Orange; Shrewsbury's home became a meeting place for the opposition to James II and he was one of the seven signatories of the letter of invitation to William in June 1688. In September he fled England for Holland and returned with William to England in November. Shrewsbury was influential in the making of the Revolution Settlement, arguing strongly in favour of recognising William and Mary as sovereigns.

== William III ==
After the ascension of William and Mary, Shrewsbury regained his regiment, received the lieutenancies of Hertfordshire and Worcestershire, and became Secretary of State for the Southern Department, succeeding his uncle the Earl of Middleton. Shrewsbury resigned from William's government in 1690 due to ill health and his opposition to the dissolution of Parliament and the dropping of the Bill that would have required an oath abjuring James as King. While in opposition he brought forward the Triennial Bill, to which the King initially refused assent. In 1694 he again became Secretary of State and was prominent in persuading the House of Commons to vote for the funds needed for William's war against France; but there is evidence that as early as 1690, when he resigned, he had made overtures to the Jacobites and was in correspondence with James at his court in exile at Saint Germain, though it has been stated on the other hand that these relations were entered upon with William's full connivance, for reasons of policy. Others aver that Shrewsbury himself was unaware of the King's knowledge and toleration, which would explain the terrifying letters he was in the habit of penning to him.

However this may be, William affected to have no suspicion of Shrewsbury's loyalty, although often presented with evidence against him. On 30 April 1694 Shrewsbury was created Marquess of Alton and Duke of Shrewsbury, and he acted as one of the regents during the King's absence from England in the two following years. In 1696 definite accusations of treason were brought against him by Sir John Fenwick, which William immediately communicated to Shrewsbury; and about this time the Secretary of State took but a small part in public business, again professing his anxiety to resign. As Lord Lieutenant of Worcestershire, he served as Colonel of the Worcestershire Militia in 1697. His plea of ill health was a genuine one, and in 1700 the King reluctantly consented to his retirement into private life.

== Exile ==
From 1700 until 1705, Shrewsbury lived abroad, chiefly at Rome, whence in 1701 he wrote a celebrated letter to Lord Somers expressing his abhorrence of public life and declaring that if he had a son he "would sooner bind him to a cobbler than a courtier, and a hangman than a statesman". He also visited France and Switzerland.

After the accession of Queen Anne in 1702 the Whig leaders, Godolphin and Marlborough made ineffectual attempts to persuade Shrewsbury to return to office. In April 1705 he left Rome for Venice, then for Augsburg, where he married Countess Adelhida Paleotti on 9 September 1705. He returned to England on 30 December 1705.

== Under Queen Anne ==
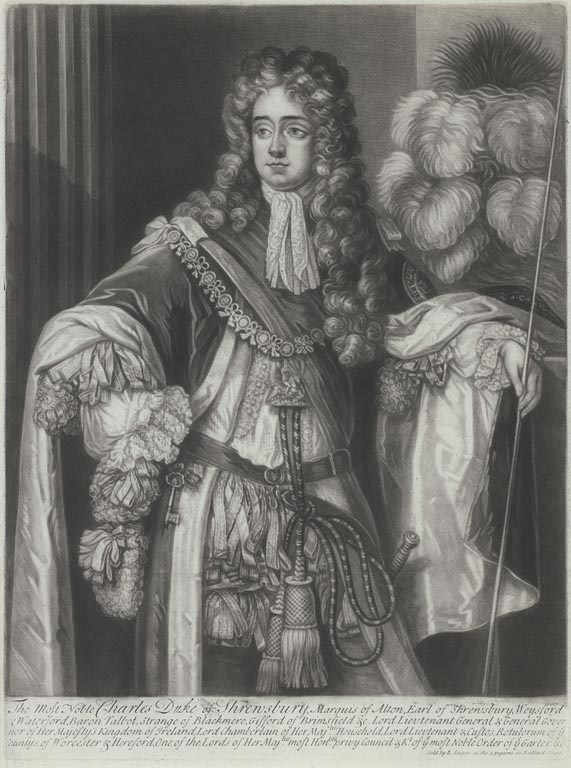
Shrewsbury in the robes of the Order of the Garter, holding his staff of office as Lord Chamberlain, a post he held 1699-1700 for William III and again 1710-1715 for Anne and for George I.

He took his seat in the House of Lords in January 1706. Upon his return to England, Shrewsbury concentrated on the construction of Heythrop Park, eschewed London society and court politics.

However, he gradually became alienated from his old political associates, and in 1710 he accepted the post of Lord Chamberlain in the Tory administration, to which the queen appointed him without the knowledge of Godolphin and Marlborough; his wife was at the same time made a Lady of the Bedchamber.

Shrewsbury played a vital role as a conciliator between Robert Harley, the Earl of Oxford and Henry St John, 1st Viscount Bolingbroke. He was an early supporter of the Tory efforts to negotiate peace with France to end the War of the Spanish Succession, concerned at the negative financial impact it was having on landowners. However, he was uncomfortable with peace negotiations that left out Britain's ally, the Dutch.

After a diplomatic mission to France for the purpose of negotiating preliminaries of peace, Shrewsbury became Lord Lieutenant of Ireland in 1713; but he was in London in July 1714 during the memorable crisis occasioned by the impending death of Queen Anne. On 29 July, when the queen was dying, the Earl of Oxford received his long-delayed dismissal from the office of Lord Treasurer. On 30 July, Shrewsbury and other ministers assembled at Kensington Palace and, being admitted to the queen's bedchamber, Bolingbroke recommended the appointment of Shrewsbury to the vacant treasurership; Anne at once placed the staff of that high office in the duke's hands. He was to be the last person to hold that position but the first to have been Lord Lieutenant of Ireland, Lord Chamberlain and Lord Treasurer at the same time.

== Accession of George I ==
Thus, when the queen died on 1 August, Shrewsbury was in a position of supreme power with reference to the momentous question of the succession to the crown. He threw his influence into the scale in favour of the Elector of Hanover, and was powerfully influential in bringing about the peaceful accession of George I, and in defeating the design of the Jacobites to place the son of James II on the throne.

The new Whig regime opposed Shrewsbury remaining in government and by 1715 he had lost all his governmental offices, although until his death he remained George's Groom of the Stool. Shrewsbury opposed the Whigs' attack on the previous Tory ministers and opposed their other policies in the Lords (such as the Septennial Act 1715), making contact with the Stuart Pretender and sending him money.

== Legacy ==
The Duke of Shrewsbury was one of the greatest noblemen of the reign of Queen Anne. Though blind in one eye, he was strikingly handsome in person, his demeanour was dignified and his manners full of grace and courtesy. Swift described him as "the finest gentleman we have", and as "the favourite of the nation", while William III spoke of him as "the King of Hearts". Like most of his contemporaries, he endeavoured to keep himself in favour both with the exiled house of Stuart and with the reigning sovereign in England; but at the two critical junctures of 1688 and 1714, he acted decisively in favour of the Protestant succession. At other times he appeared weak and vacillating, and he never wholeheartedly supported either Whigs or Tories, though he co-operated with each in turn. His magnanimous disposition saved him from the vindictiveness of the party politician of the period; and the weak health from which he suffered through life probably combined with a congenital lack of ambition to prevent his grasping the power which his personality and talents might have placed in his hands.

== Private life and death ==
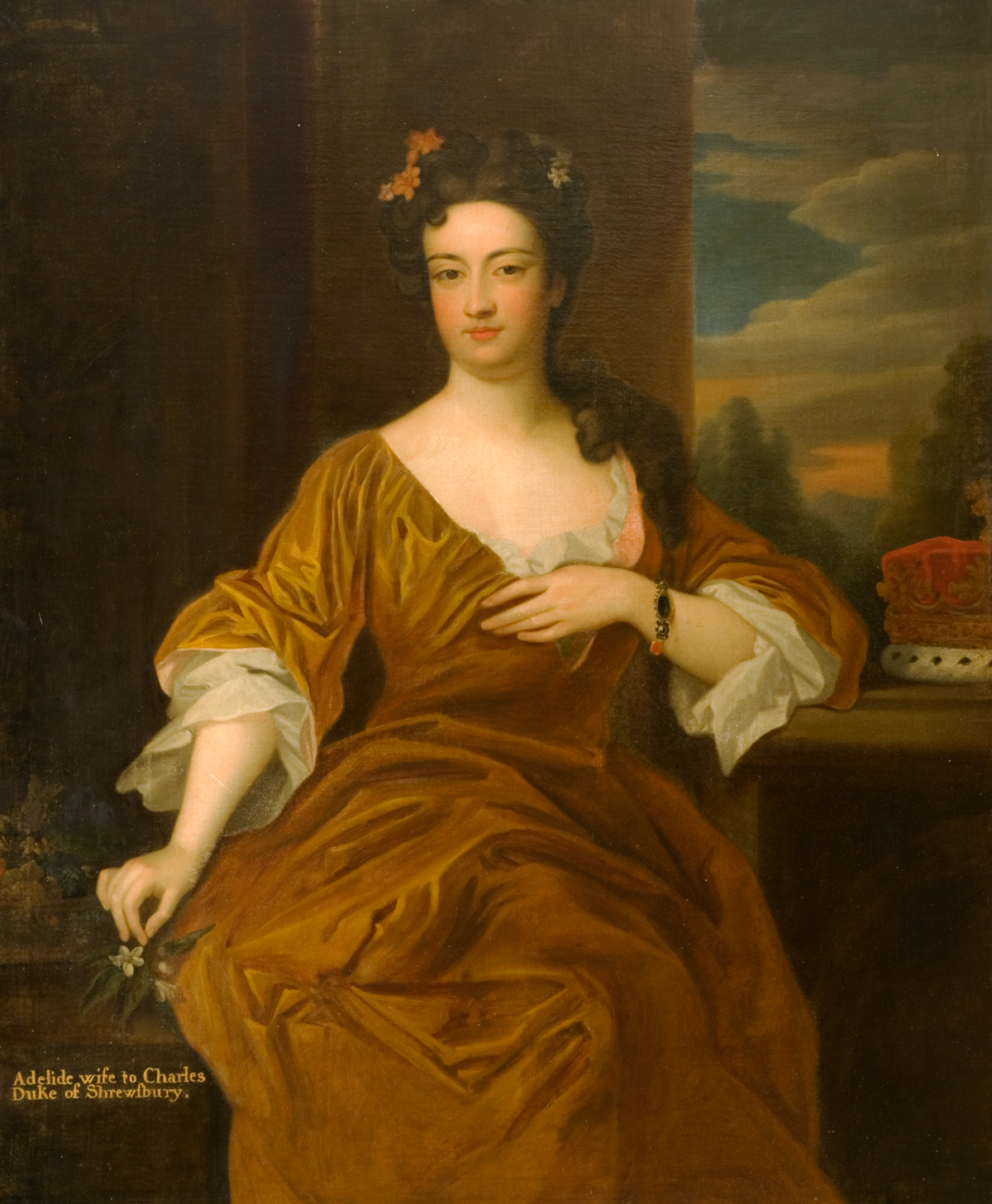
Adelhida Paleotti became Charles Talbot's wife in 1705.

In 1705 Shrewsbury married, at Augsburg, Bavaria, Adelhida Paleotti, daughter of the Marquis Andrea Paleotti by his second wife Maria Cristina Dudley, fifth daughter of Carlo Dudley, titular Duke of Northumberland (himself son of Sir Robert Dudley (1574–1649), an Englishman turned member of the Tuscan nobility). This lady, who is said to have had "a great many engaging qualities" besides many accomplishments, was the subject of much malicious gossip. She was the widow, or as some declared, the mistress of a Count Brachiano; and Lady Cowper reported that the lady's brother had forced Shrewsbury to marry her "after an intrigue together".

After Shrewsbury's return to England, the duchess became conspicuous in London society, where the caustic wit of Lady Mary Wortley Montagu was exercised at her expense. She won the favour of Queen Anne, after the death of Prince George of Denmark, by her impulsive comment: "Oh my poor Queen I see how much you do miss your dear husband". During the Paris embassy, she became extremely popular, due to her hospitality and lively conversation. Saint Simon thought that her eccentricity bordered on madness, but he did praise the simple, practical hairstyle which she made fashionable.

On the accession of George I, the Duchess of Shrewsbury became a lady of the bedchamber to the Princess of Wales, a position which she retained till her death on 29 June 1726. Shrewsbury left no children, and at his death the dukedom became extinct, the earldom of Shrewsbury passing to his cousin Gilbert Talbot. Gilbert was a Roman Catholic priest living abroad and on his death in 1744 the titles and estates devolved on his brother George.

He died at his London home, Warwick House, Charing Cross, on 1 February 1718, from inflammation of the lungs, aged fifty-seven. He was buried in the family tomb at the parish church of Albrighton (near Wolverhampton), Shropshire.

== Cultural references ==
The Duke is the central character in the historical novel, Shrewsbury (1897), by Stanley Weyman. As a minor but pivotal character, he was portrayed by Job Stewart in six episodes of the sprawling ensemble BBC serial The First Churchills (1969).

== See also ==
- William Chaloner

== Notes ==
Political offices
Preceded by The Earl of Middleton	Secretary of State for the Southern Department; 1689–1690	Succeeded by The Earl of Nottingham
Preceded by Sir John Trenchard	Secretary of State for the Northern Department; 1694–1695	Succeeded by Sir William Trumbull
Preceded by Sir John Trenchard	Secretary of State for the Southern Department; 1695–1698	Succeeded by James Vernon
Preceded by The Earl of Sunderland	Lord Chamberlain; 1699–1700	Succeeded by The Earl of Jersey
Preceded by The Duke of Ormonde	Lord Lieutenant of Ireland; 1713–1714	Succeeded by The Earl of Sunderland
Preceded by The Earl of Oxford and Mortimer	Lord High Treasurer; 1714	Succeeded by In Commission (First Lord: The Earl of Halifax)
Preceded by The Duke of Kent	Lord Chamberlain; 1710–1715	Succeeded by The Duke of Bolton
Diplomatic posts
Preceded by The Duke of Hamilton	British Ambassador to France; 1712–1713	Succeeded by Matthew Prior
Military offices
New regiment	Colonel of The Earl of Shrewsbury's Regiment of Horse; 1685–1687	Succeeded by The Lord Langdale
Honorary titles
Preceded by Francis Talbot, 11th Earl of Shrewsbury	Lord High Steward of Ireland; 1667–1718	Succeeded by Gilbert Talbot, 13th Earl of Shrewsbury
Preceded by The Earl of Sunderland	Lord Lieutenant of Staffordshire; 1681–1687	Succeeded by The Earl Ferrers
Preceded by The Earl of Sunderland	Custos Rotulorum of Staffordshire; 1681–1688	Succeeded by The Lord Aston of Forfar
Preceded by The Earl of Rochester	Lord Lieutenant of Hertfordshire; 1689–1691	Succeeded by The Earl of Essex
Preceded by The Viscount Carrington	Lord Lieutenant of Worcestershire; 1689–1718	Vacant Title next held by The Earl of Coventry
Preceded by The 1st Earl of Macclesfield	Lord Lieutenant of North Wales (Anglesey, Caernarvonshire, Denbighshire, Flintshire, Merionethshire and Montgomeryshire); 1694–1696	Succeeded by The 2nd Earl of Macclesfield
Preceded by The 1st Earl of Macclesfield	Lord Lieutenant of Herefordshire; 1694–1704	Succeeded by The Earl of Kent
Preceded by The Earl of Bradford	Lord Lieutenant of Shropshire; 1712–1714	Succeeded by The Earl of Bradford
Peerage of England
New creation	Duke of Shrewsbury; 1694–1718	Extinct
Preceded by Francis Talbot	Earl of Shrewsbury; 1667–1718	Succeeded by Gilbert Talbot
Peerage of Ireland
Preceded by Francis Talbot	Earl of Waterford; 1667–1718	Succeeded by Gilbert Talbot
