= Gilbert Talbot, 13th Earl of Shrewsbury =

English Jesuit priest

Gilbert Talbot, 13th Earl of Shrewsbury (11 January 1672 – 22 July 1743) was an English Jesuit priest, nobleman, and peer, also known as Father Grey.

The eldest son of Gilbert Talbot, second son of John Talbot, 10th Earl of Shrewsbury (1601–1654), Talbot was born in Staffordshire and educated at the English College in Saint-Omer. In 1694 he entered the Society of Jesus as a novice at Watten in French Flanders and in 1701 was sent to join the English Mission of the College of St Aloysius in Lancashire, officiating at Preston, Billington, and other places. In 1709, he took the four vows of the Jesuits, poverty, chastity, obedience, and submission to the pope. As a Catholic priest, he was known as Father Grey. In 1711, Talbot was Rector of the College in Lancashire, but soon after that was sent to join the College of the Holy Apostles in Suffolk, where he also served as chaplain to the young Lord Petre at Ingatestone Hall.· Talbot was reported to be a clergyman of great merit, with prudence and pleasant manners, but was strongly averse to taking on the pastoral care of a parish.

In 1718, Talbot succeeded his first cousin Charles Talbot, Duke of Shrewsbury (1660–1718), as thirteenth Earl of Shrewsbury and Earl of Waterford, and would have inherited great estates in Shropshire and elsewhere, but some years before he had renounced his right to them in favour of his younger brother, George Talbot. His cousin was the first duke and had no sons, so the dukedom died with him.

As an earl in the peerage of England, Talbot was entitled to a seat in the House of Lords, but as a Catholic he was disabled from holding most offices of state, and he neither used his new titles nor sought to enter parliament.

In 1721, the Propaganda Fide considered Shrewsbury for appointment as coadjutor bishop of the Apostolic Vicariate of the London District, but in the event it was Benjamin Petre who accepted the role.

About 1726, Talbot became chaplain to Lady Stourton, the widow of Lord Petre, at Dunkenhalgh in Lancashire. In 1734 he also became Rector of the Lancashire College. In 1738 he joined the Jesuit College of St Ignatius in London, where he died. On his death, the family peerages were inherited by his nephew George Talbot, a son of his younger brother.

== Arms ==
Arms of Talbot

The arms of the head of the family are blazoned gules, a lion rampant within a bordure engrailed or. These are claimed to have been the arms of Rhys Mechyll (died 1244) Prince of the Welsh House of Dinefwr, grandson of Rhys ap Gruffydd, whose daughter and heiress Gwenllian married Gilbert Talbot (died 1274), grandfather of Gilbert Talbot, 1st Baron Talbot (died 1345/6). Talbot is reported to have assumed them as the arms of alliance of a great heiress, superseding his own paternal arms of Bendy of ten pieces argent and gules.

Political offices
Preceded by The Duke of Shrewsbury	Lord High Steward of Ireland; 1718–1743	Succeeded by The Earl of Shrewsbury
Peerage of England
Preceded by Charles Talbot	Earl of Shrewsbury; 1718–1743	Succeeded by George Talbot
Peerage of Ireland
Preceded by Charles Talbot	Earl of Waterford; 1718–1743	Succeeded by George Talbot
