= Dell'Arcano del Mare =

17th-century encyclopaedia by Robert Dudley

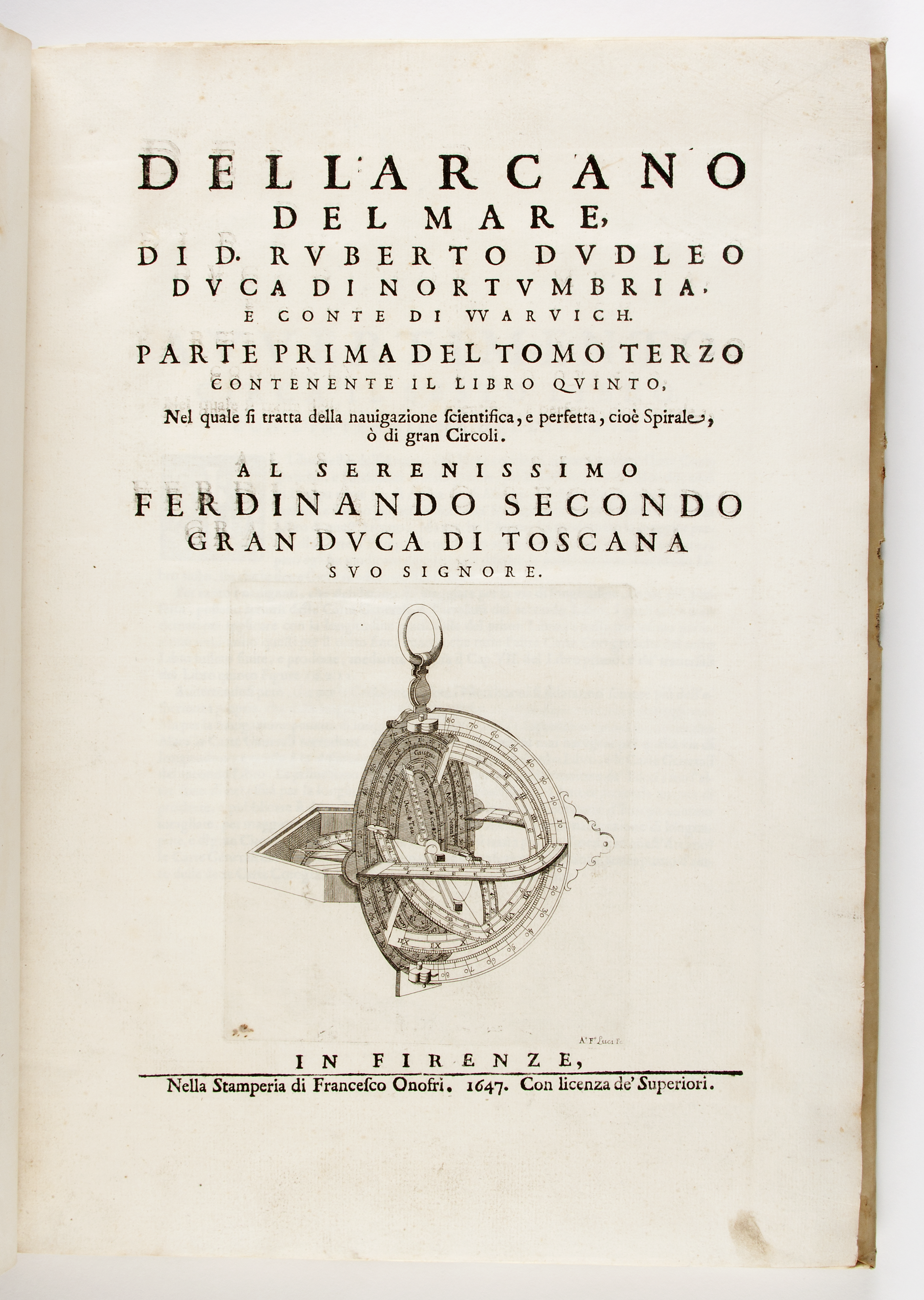
Pergamentband

Dell'Arcano del Mare by Sir Robert Dudley is a 17th-century maritime encyclopaedia, the sixth part of which comprises a maritime atlas of the entire world, which is the first such in print, the first made by an Englishman, and the first to use the Mercator projection. The work was first published in Italian at Florence in 1645 and 1646 in three folio volumes.

Among other things, it is remarkable for its inclusion of a proposal for the construction of a navy in five rates (sizes) which Dudley designed and described. It was reprinted in Florence in a two volume folio edition in 1661.

The seventh map is dedicated to Dudley's patrons, Ferdinando II de' Medici, the Grand Duke of Tuscany and the Grand Duchess of Tuscany Vittoria della Rovere. The map covers the northeast coast of South America, which Dudley had visited in 1594. The area depicted covers modern French Guiana, Guyana, and a small portion of Brazil. The map also depicts "Monoa", the area otherwise known as El Dorado.

== Scope ==
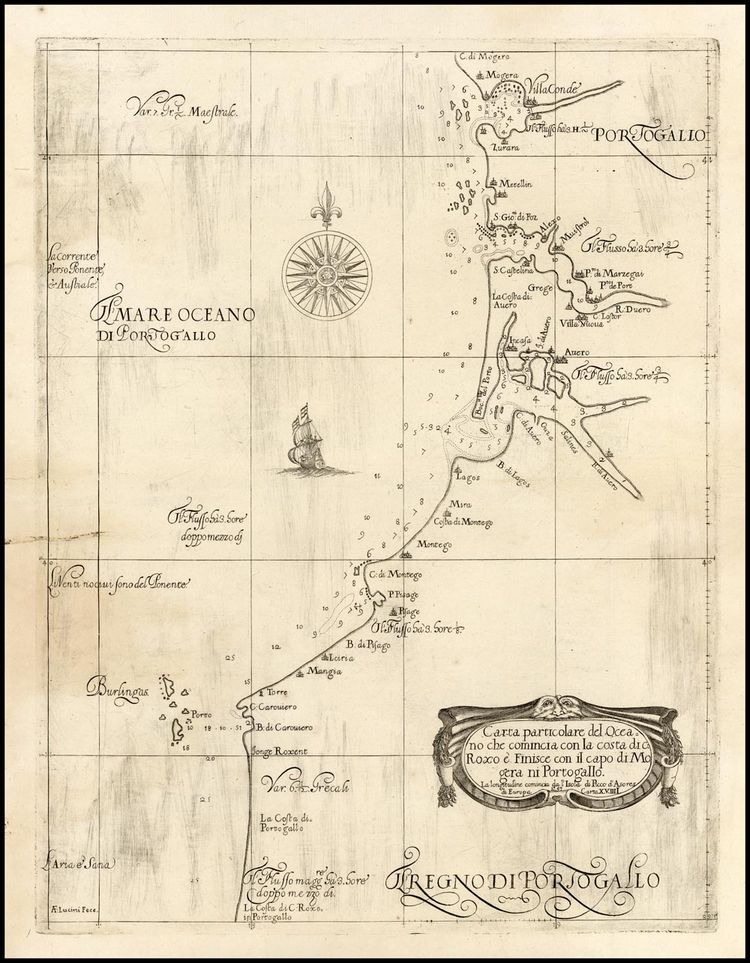
Dell'Arcano del Mare: chart of Portugal (Florence, 1646)

The six-part work covered navigation, shipbuilding and astronomy, with 146 maps in two volumes (nos. 2 and 6) . Unlike the vast majority of his contemporaries, Dudley's maps are all his own and were not copied from other mapmakers. They have an instantly recognisable style, closer to the pre-17th-century manuscript portolan charts than the richly decorated maps of Mercator, Hondius and Blaeu.

== Style ==
The distinctive Baroque style of Dudley's charts is in part attributable to the elegant engraving of Antonio Francesco Lucini.

His map making is an early use of Mercator projection.

== Individual maps ==
=== Carta Particolare Che Mostra Il Capo Buona Speranza ===
"Carta Particolare Che Mostra Il Capo Buona Speranza" is a very large sea chart of southwest Africa from Cape Fria to Cape of Good Hope, including Tristan da Cunha.

=== Carta Quarta Generale di Europa ===
"Carta Quarta Generale di Europa", 1646 is one of the larger scale, generalised (Carta Generale) maps and shows the West coast of France, southward from La Rochelle, and the Northern coast of Spain. This is the least ornate of the styles adopted by Dudley with no adornment other than the cartouche and a compass rose and fairly plain calligraphy.

=== Smaller scale maps ===
Four additional maps represent the majority of the smaller scale, more specific (Carta Particolare) maps and include sailing ships, notes on prevailing winds and currents and more stylised calligraphy.

=== Carta Particolare della Costa Australe scoperta dalla Ollandesia ===
"Carta Particolare della Costa Australe scoperta dalla Ollandesia", 1646. According to Tooley, this map is the first separately printed map of Australia and is consequently of great value. It shows, in addition to the west side of the Cape York peninsula, much of the island of New Guinea. By labelling the Torres Strait "Golfo Incognito" Dudley leaves open the question of whether New Guinea is connected to the Southern continent.

=== Carta Particolare della Rio d' Amazone con la costa sin al fiume Maranhan ===
"Carta Particolare della Rio d' Amazone con la costa sin al fiume Maranhan" of 1646 shows the mouth of the Amazon River.

=== Carta particolare che comincia con l' Isola di S. Tomaso o Tome....Clara e finisce con Il c. d' Aldeas ===
"Carta particolare che comincia con l' Isola di S. Tomaso o Tome....Clara e finisce con Il c. d' Aldeas". This map of the shoreline of the African Congo includes an cartouche, and islands off the coastline.

=== Carta particolare della Brasilia Australe che comincia dala Poro del Spirito Santo e finisce con il capo Bianco ===
"Carta particolare della Brasilia Australe che comincia dala Poro del Spirito Santo e finisce con il capo Bianco" reveals a strip of the southern Brazil coastline and includes São Paulo and the area later to become Rio de Janeiro. Noted for some of the most peculiar representations of mountains near the coastline found on any Dudley map.

French Guiana, Guyana and a small portion of Brazil.

=== Untitled, (N-E South America) ===
The seventh map is one of only two in the atlas which have no title but instead dedications to Ferdinando II de' Medici, the Grand Duke of Tuscany and, in this case, the Grand Duchess of Tuscany Vittoria della Rovere, Dudley's patrons. This is another double page map and probably comes from the 1646 edition. These two maps are probably different because they are the only ones where Dudley was able to use his own observations as they cover the North East coast of South America, the area he visited in 1594. This map shows the coasts of French Guiana, Guyana and a small portion of Brazil. Considerably more elaborate than the others, this map includes soundings and numerous illustrations, namely: two ships, a canoe, two magnificent sea monsters, a (?) cougar and two natives. It also has a legend stating that Monoa – more often known as El Dorado – is only 12 days' journey up-river from the coast.
