= Adelhida Talbot, Duchess of Shrewsbury =

British court official and noble

Naturalization of Adelaide Duchess of Shrewsbury Act 1705
- Act of Parliament
- Parliament of England
- Long title: An Act for naturalizing Adelaide Dutchess of Shrewsbury.
- Citation: 4 & 5 Ann. c. 4 Pr. (Note: This is the citation in The Statutes of the Realm.); 4 Ann. c. 4 Pr. (Note: This is the citation in The Statutes at Large.)
- Territorial extent: England and Wales

Dates
- Royal assent: 16 February 1706
- Commencement: 25 October 1705 (Note: Start of session.)

Status: Current legislation

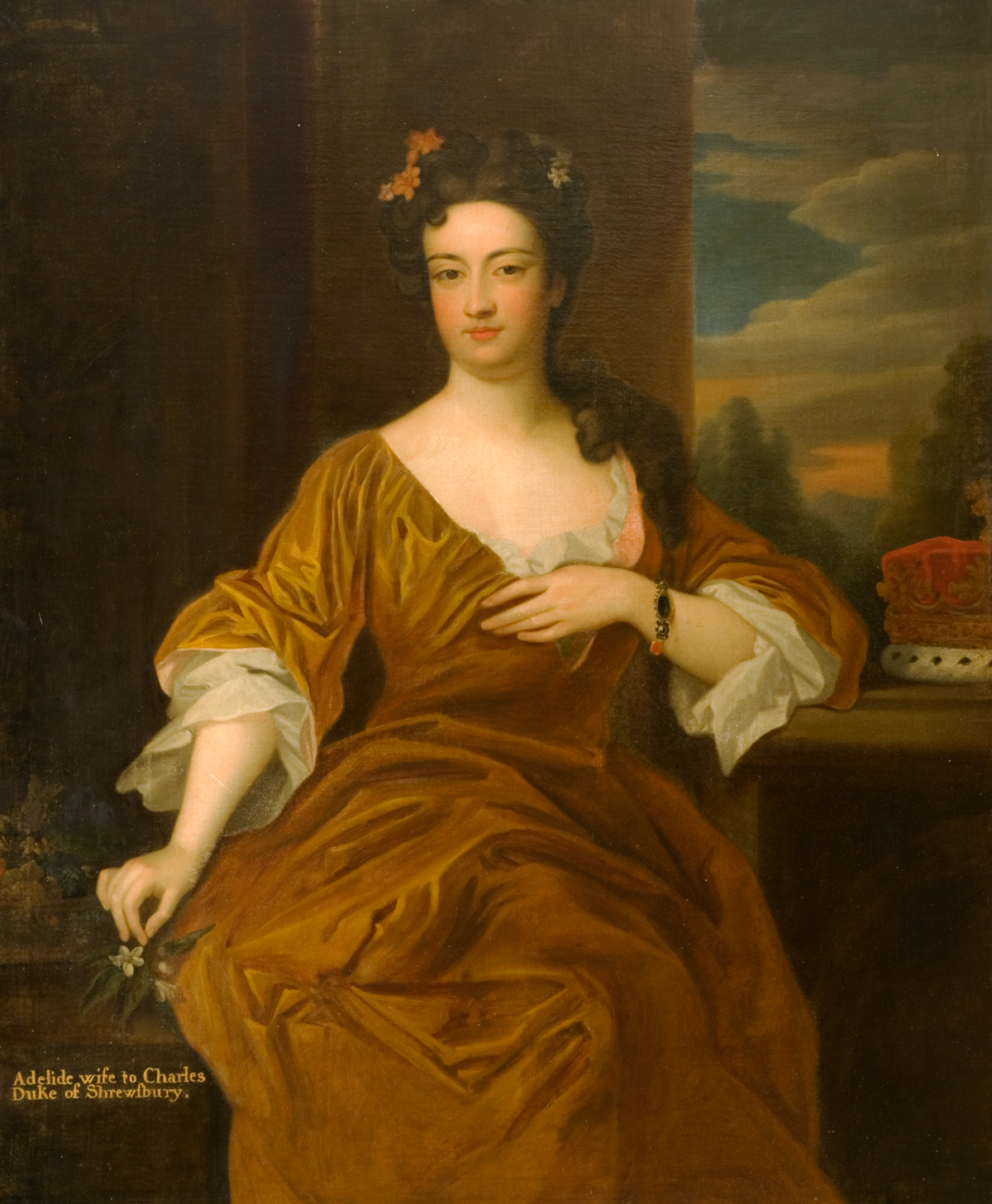
Adelhida Talbot

Adelhida Talbot (née Paleotti; 24 July 1660 – 29 June 1726) was a British court official and noble, the wife of Charles Talbot, 1st Duke of Shrewsbury. She was the daughter of the Marchese Andrea Paleotti and his wife Mary Christina (née Dudley), who was descended illegitimately from Robert Dudley, 1st Earl of Leicester.

Her first marriage (or possibly a liaison) was with a Count Roffeni, who was said to be in the service of Queen Christina of Sweden. She was apparently widowed when she met the duke in Italy; he claimed to have converted her to Protestantism by lending her a Bible.

She married the duke at Augsburg, Bavaria, on 20 August (or September) 1705. He told only his closest friends, saying that he knew that the circumstance of her "being a foreigner and without fortune" would arouse criticism. Shortly afterwards, on 23 January 1706, a bill came before Parliament to enable her to be naturalised, and was passed as the Naturalization of Adelaide Duchess of Shrewsbury Act 1705 (4 & 5 Ann. c. 4 Pr.).

After their return to Britain, the duchess became known in London society and was favoured by Queen Anne, with whom she is said to have sympathised on the death of Prince George of Denmark, saying: "Oh, my poor Queen, I see how much you do miss your dear husband". She was an equally big success with King George I, who arranged for her to become a Lady of the Bedchamber to Caroline of Ansbach, Princess of Wales. This situation aroused the jealousy of other court ladies, including Lady Mary Wortley Montagu, who satirised the duchess in "Roxana", one of her "Town Eclogues". The Duchess of Marlborough, who belonged to a different political camp from the duchess, commented on her lewd behaviour. It was also suggested that she had an affair with Charles Mohun, 4th Baron Mohun, a well-known philanderer.

The duchess charmed the French during an official visit to Paris by her husband in 1713. Louis de Rouvroy, Duc de Saint-Simon, thought that her eccentricity bordered on madness, but he agreed with her criticisms of the extreme of French ladies fashions and praised the simple, practical hairstyle which she made fashionable. Shrewsbury and his wife had no children, and at his death the dukedom became extinct, while the earldom passed to a cousin, Gilbert Talbot. The duchess died in Shropshire aged 65, eight years after her husband.
