= Thomas Drury (1551–1603) =

British government informer, messenger and swindler

Thomas Drury (8 May 1551 – 26 August 1603) was an English government informer, messenger and swindler, who is noted for having been one of the main people responsible for accusations of heresy, blasphemy, and seditious atheism on the part of the Elizabethan playwright Christopher Marlowe given to the Privy Council in May 1593. Within a couple of weeks, Marlowe, just 29, was dead.

== Early life ==
Thomas Drury was born to Robert Drury of Hawstead, Suffolk, and his wife Audrey, née Rich, the daughter of the former Lord Chancellor Richard Rich, notorious for his alleged perjury which led to the conviction and execution of Sir Thomas More. He was the third of four brothers—William, Robert, Thomas himself, and Henry. They were also first cousins to the Robert Rich who married the Earl of Essex's sister Penelope, the "Stella" immortalised in Sir Philip Sidney's Astrophel and Stella.

Thomas's father died when he was only six, so his paternal grandfather, Sir William Drury, left 'in reversion'—in other words not to be inherited until they were 21—a third share each of Lincolnshire property to Robert, Thomas, and Henry, with the eldest son William getting everything else, including the London property Drury House, after which Drury Lane was named. The youngest son, Henry, died in 1561 aged 10.

In 1564, Thomas went to Cambridge as a gentleman pensioner at Caius College, although there is no record of his obtaining a degree, possibly because he was a Catholic like most of his family and would therefore not take the required (Protestant) oath.

== After university ==
There is a possibility that during the 1570s he was employed in some capacity by the Lord Keeper Sir Nicholas Bacon, and got to know Bacon's sons Nicholas, Anthony, and Francis during this period. There is also some evidence of his having married an Elizabeth Fitzharding possibly around this time.

The first actual record of him after university, however, concerns what appears to have been a deliberate attempt on his part to cheat Lord Burgh and his two sons out of a large sum of money. Apparently abetted by his elder brother William, Drury made himself untraceable on the date when a £100 loan had to be repaid to him, meaning the forfeiture of £300 to him instead. Lord Burgh filed a complaint on 27 June 1580, but the result is not known. Ironically, brother William would die ten years later from wounds received whilst duelling with Sir John Burgh, allegedly over matters of "precedence".

There were also unsavoury connections with the Earl of Oxford being spoken of in 1580, when Oxford was accused of urging Drury (with Oxford's own "cutters", or thugs) to kill the Earl of Arundel.

== Prison and overseas ==
There is a gap knowledge of what Thomas Drury was up to until 22 June 1585, when he appears in the Fleet Prison, although neither the reason nor the duration is known.

Back in early 1570s, however, his brother William had married Sir Edward Stafford's sister Elizabeth, and Sir Edward was appointed the English Ambassador in Paris between 1583 and 1590. The fact that Stafford had an allegedly "iniquitous" secretary called Dewry in 1587 therefore suggests this was Thomas, and given Stafford's reputation for treachery in which this secretary was apparently involved, once more in a rather dubious occupation.

On 13 May 1591, six months after Stafford's recall, a warrant was issued for Drury's arrest and his home was searched for "matters of state". He was taken to the Marshalsea prison two days later, charged with "divers great and fond matters", and was to spend the next 15 months to 2 years there. He had been informed on and arrested by his companion, Richard Cholmeley.

Drury was still in prison on 8 November 1592 when Lord Buckhurst wrote to his fellow Privy Councillor Lord Keeper Puckering having visited him there at Puckering's request. Buckhurst's assessment was that if Drury "may have liberty & leave to go beyond the seas" he "will adventure himself somewhat to do some service." We do not know exactly when he was released, nor precisely why, but Drury does indeed appear to having doing some service for Puckering by early May 1593.

== Attack on Christopher Marlowe ==
In April and May 1593, various anti-immigrant posters had been appearing in London, one of the most vicious being the so-called "Dutch Church libel" which was posted on 5 May. Written in blank verse, it was signed with the name of one of Christopher Marlowe's most famous characters, Tamburlaine, and contained references to at least two other plays of his. On 10 May, the Lord Mayor offered 100 crowns reward for information, and the following day the Privy Council authorised torture in discovering the perpetrator.

Some time between the posting of the Dutch Church libel and the offer of the reward, Thomas Drury was sent to "stay" Richard Baines, an acquaintance of his, who was thought to know who was responsible. Apparently as a direct result of this, by 12 May the playwright Thomas Kyd had been arrested. In his chamber were found fragments of what were called "vile heretical conceits denying the deity of Jesus Christ our saviour". He claimed that they were Marlowe's, who he said had shared a room with him a couple of years earlier and who had affirmed that they were his. Under torture in the Bridewell prison, Kyd made a series of allegations concerning Marlowe's atheism, which he later confirmed in writing to Puckering.

At about the same time, Drury was preparing a list of accusations, the so-called "Remembrances" against Richard Cholmeley, which included his having a "damnable crew" who intended "to draw Her Majesty's subjects to be Atheists" and "after Her Majesty's decease to make a king among themselves and live according to their own laws." Cholmeley appeared to use Marlowe as their guru, and claimed that he was "able to show more sound reasons for Atheism than any divine in England is able to give to prove divinity."

Drury also claimed that "there was by my only means set down unto the Lord Keeper (and) the Lord of Buckhurst the notablest and vilest articles of atheism that I suppose the like was never known or read of in any age." Most biographers take this to refer to the so-called "Baines Note", the notorious list of accusations levelled at Marlowe by Richard Baines. Drury was therefore claiming that it was at his instigation that Baines had produced it and that he, Drury, had delivered it to Puckering.

After spending nearly two years in the Marshalsea because of Cholmeley's treachery, Drury must have borne a grudge against him. It is known that Baines and Marlowe had "malice one to another". That there was therefore some collusion between Drury and Baines, whether encouraged by others or not, to bring about the demise of both Marlowe and Cholmeley is clear. In less than a month, Marlowe was dead and Cholmeley carted off to prison, never to be heard of again.

Drury's disappointment at having received no payment for any of these things is reflected in a letter he wrote to Anthony Bacon on 1 August 1593.

== Later years ==
The "Remembrances" contained abusive things which Richard Cholmeley had apparently said about the Lord Chamberlain, Lord Hunsdon. Unfortunately, his Lordship had apparently thought that these were Drury's own views, and (for the third time) he found himself in prison. In this case however, he wrote a letter to Sir Robert Cecil, who apparently arranged for his release, another letter dated 17 August in fact thanking him for doing so.

In early summer 1595, in France, Drury was bearing letters back to court, a £16 warrant—which suggested much more than a simple message delivery—being signed by Sir Robert Cecil's father Lord Burghley.

He returned to less reputable activities, however, so that in about 1599 he was described by his own nephew as "that degenerate rogue Tom Drury", and even after his death the Attorney-General Sir Edward Coke called him "a man of mean condition and notoriously evil character". In fact the last of his recorded deeds was to coach a woman called Magadalen Salisbury in perjured evidence.

Thomas Drury died of the plague in 1603 in his lodgings at the Swan Inn in Southwark.
