= Italy and the colonization of the Americas =

Italy and the colonization of the Americas was related to

Primarily:

- An aborted attempt to create a colony in the Americas, in what is now French Guiana, made by the Grand Duchy of Tuscany in the early 1600s.
- An attempt to create a colony in the Antilles by an Italian Grand Master of the Knights Hospitaller of Malta (then part of Sicily).
- From circa 1518, merchants from the Genoese Republic ruled the commerce and the port of Old Panama (Panamá Viejo), the oldest European settlement on the Pacific coast of the Americas.

Secondarily:

- Italian explorers and colonizers serving for other European nations;
- the role played by the Pope in Christianizing the New World and resolving disputes between competing colonial powers.
- Beginning in the first decades of the 19th century, there were "colonies" of Italians in many Latin American nations

== Grand Duchy of Tuscany expedition ==
Ferdinando I ordered an expedition in order to create a Tuscan settlement on the territory of modern French Guiana.

The Grand Duchy of Tuscany's expedition to South America was the only tentative foray into colonization by Italians in the centuries after Columbus's discovery.

The Thornton expedition was a 1608 Tuscan expedition under Captain Robert Thornton, an Englishman, who was sent by Ferdinando I of Tuscany to explore northern Brazil and the Amazon River and prepare for the establishment of a settlement in northern coastal South America, which would serve as a base to export Brazilian wood to Renaissance Italy.

The area that Thornton considered as a possible site of a Tuscan or Italian colony now lies in modern French Guiana, near Cayenne, which would be colonised by France in 1630.

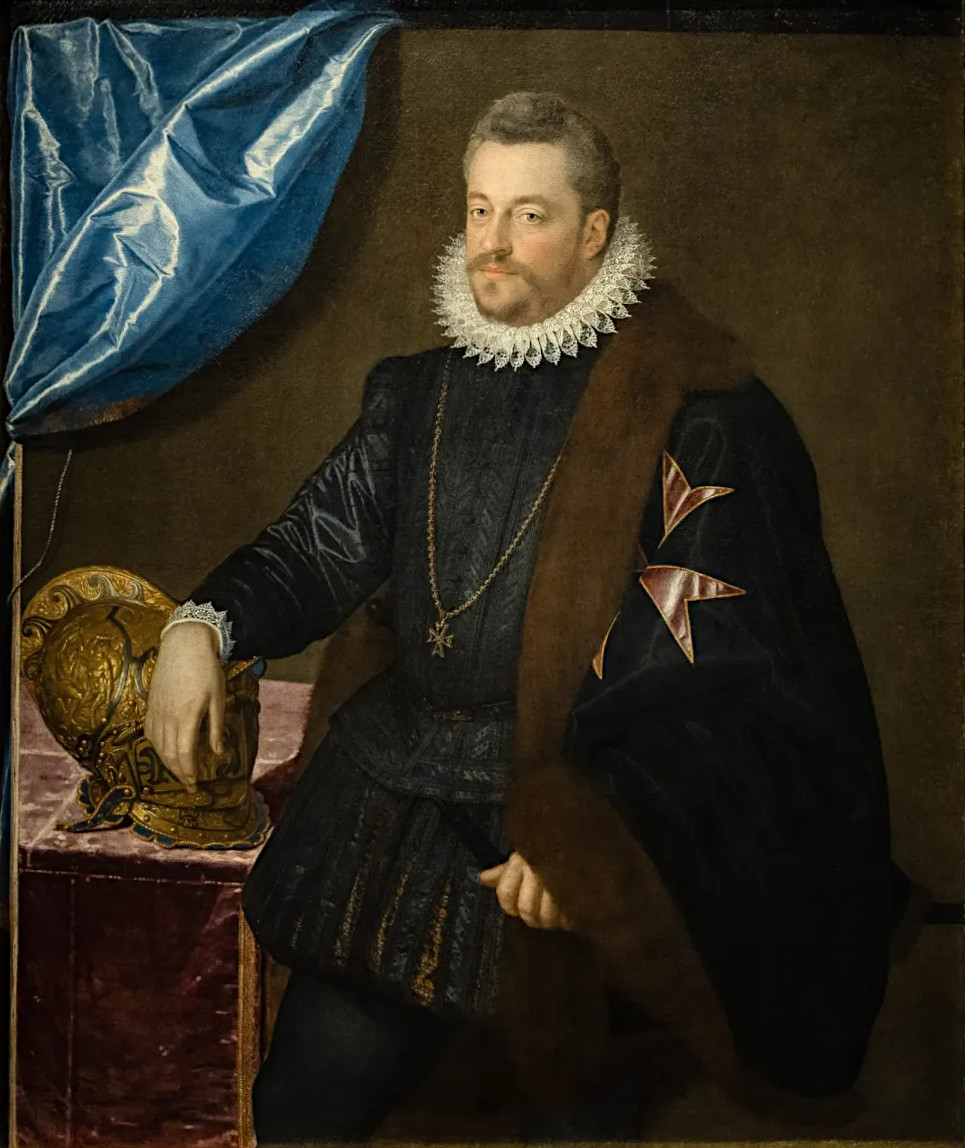
Ferdinando I Medici, Grand Duchy of Tuscany

In the first years of the 17th century, Ferdinando I of Tuscany evaluated the possibility of a colony in Brazil and gave captain Thornton a caravelle and a tartane for an expedition in 1608.

Thornton sailed for one year, reaching Guyana and northern Brazil and exploring the Amazon and Orinoco rivers, but in February of that year the Grand Duke died and in Florence, no one thereafter considered establishing an overseas colony.

Indeed, Thornton was ready to sail back to the area between the rivers Orinoco and Amazon in the summer of 1609 with nearly one hundred Italian settlers from Livorno and Lucca to create a settlement in the bay of actual Cayenne, but the project was scrapped.

Thornton's galleon 'Santa Lucia' returned to Italy in 1609 with plenty of information (after exploring the area between Trinidad island and the delta of the Amazon river), some indigenous natives of the Americas and a few tropical parrots.

== Malta's Knights Hospitaller ==
In the 17th century Malta was under the rule of the king of Sicily, who gave the direct control of the island to the Knights Hospitaller. Because of this rule Malta was considered an "Italian State" (like the Republic of Venice or the Grand Duchy of Tuscany)

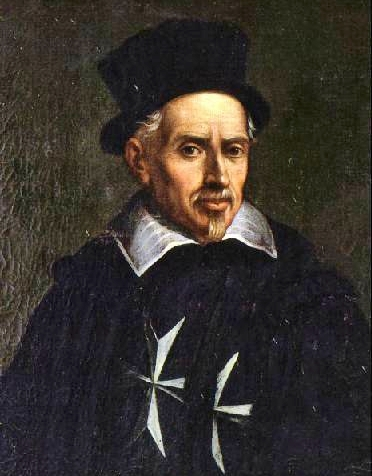
Giovanni Paolo Lascaris

Giovanni Paolo Lascaris, Italian nobleman and Grand Master of the Knights Hospitaller of Malta, was interested in colonial affairs and in 1651 bought the island of Saint-Christophe, along with the dependent islands of Saint Croix, Saint Barthélemy, and Saint Martin, from the failing Compagnie des Îles de l'Amérique. The Knights' ambassador to the French court, Jacques de Souvré, signed the agreement.

The Order's proprietary rights were confirmed in a treaty with France two years later: while the king would remain sovereign, the Knights would have complete temporal and spiritual jurisdiction on their islands. The only limits to their rule were that they could only send French knights to govern the islands, and upon the accession of each new King of France they were to provide a gold crown worth 1,000 écus. In 1665, after Lascaris's death, the Knights sold their islands back to France, ending their brief colonial project.

== Genoese republic's port of Panama ==
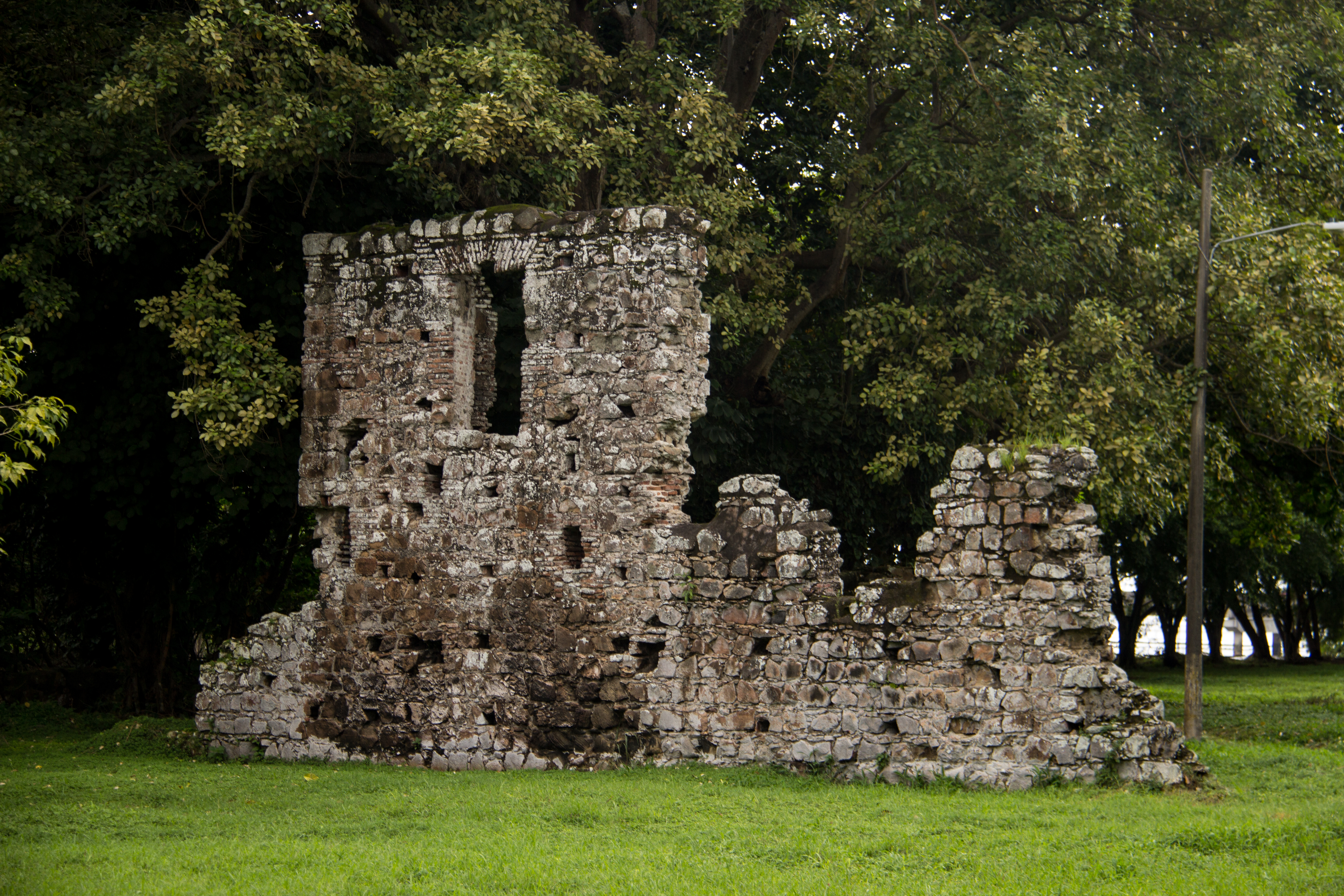
The "Casa de los Genoveses" (house of the Genoese) in Panama Viejo

The Genoese obtained this concession by the Spaniards, who had the Republic of Genoa as allies, primarily for its relevance in the slave trade of the New World (the Asiento de Negros monopoly was outsourced to Genoese merchants established in Seville in 1518).

By the 17th century, the group of single-story structures known as "Casa de los Genoveses" stood between the port beach of "La Tasca" and the "Calle de los Calafates", thus dominating the entire bay of Panama Viejo on its Eastern side. It is believed to have been the property of Genoese merchants Domenico Grillo and Ambrogio Lomellini (holders of the Asiento de Negros in 1662–1671) and to have been the seat of the black slave trade in the ancient city.

The Genoese kept the concession until the destruction of the original city, following the raid by the pirate Henry Morgan in 1671.

== See also ==
- European colonization of the Americas
- Italian diaspora in the Americas

== Bibliography ==
- Ridolfi, R. Pensieri medicei di colonizzare il Brasile, in «Il Veltro» (luglio-agosto 1962). Roma, 1962
