= Thornton expedition =

1608 Italian expedition in South America

Ferdinando I ordered an expedition in order to create a Tuscan settlement on the territory of modern French Guiana

The Thornton expedition was a 1608 Tuscan expedition under Captain Robert Thornton, an Englishman, sent by Ferdinando I of Tuscany. It was done in order to explore northern Brazil and the Amazon River and prepare for the establishment of a settlement in northern coastal South America, which would serve as a base to export Brazilian wood to Renaissance Italy. The area that Thornton considered as a possible site of a Tuscan colony now lies in modern French Guiana, near Cayenne, which would be colonised by France in 1630. The expedition was the only attempt by an Italian state to colonise the Americas.

The Amazon region had been previously visited by numerous European explorers and traders over the course of the preceding century. Robert Harcourt sailed for Guiana in 1608, establishing an English base on the Oyapock River which lasted a few years. William Davies, a surgeon on the Thornton expedition noted that they expected to find the Amazon by sailing south from the West Indies until "...you shall see the Sea change to a ruddie colour, the water shall grow fresh, by these signes you may run boldly your course [sic]."

Sailing from Livorno in September 1608, Thornton returned to the same port in the end of June 1609, reportedly completing the voyage without losing a man. He brought back with him to Tuscany five or six natives, most of whom died of smallpox. Only one lived on at the Medici court for several years, and learned to speak Tuscan. The natives often talked about the richness and fertility of their native land, speaking of a country rich in silver and gold. Thornton himself corroborated these reports, and asserted that the country was rich in rosewood, wild sugar canes, white pepper, balsam, cotton and many other kinds of merchandise which would form an abundant commerce for the Tuscans.

However, once back in Tuscany, Thornton found that Ferdinando I had died, and that his successor Cosimo II was uninterested in the establishment of a colony. Thornton was ready to sail back to the area between the Orinoco and Amazon rivers in the summer of 1609 with Italian settlers from Livorno and Lucca, but the project was scrapped.

In the first years of the 17th century Ferdinando I of Tuscany evaluated the possibility of a colony in Brasil […] Ferdinando gave captain Thornton a caravelle and a tartane [for an expedition in 1608] […] Thornton sailed for one year: he reached Guyana and Brasil, exploring the Amazon and Orinoco rivers. […] In July 1609 he was back in Livorno, but in February of that year the Grand Duke died and in Florence nobody [after him] was still thinking about establishing an overseas colony.

— Matteo Sanfilippo

== See also ==
- Italy and the colonization of the Americas

== Bibliography ==
- Franzina, Emilio. Storia dell'emigrazione italiana. Donzelli Editore. Roma, 2002 ISBN 88-7989-719-5
- Ridolfi, R. Pensieri medicei di colonizzare il Brasile, in «Il Veltro» (luglio-agosto 1962). Roma, 1962
- Sanfilippo, Matteo. Gli Italiani in Brasile. Edizioni Sette Citta'. Viterbo, 2008
