= 1710 British general election =

Election in Great Britain

- 2 October – 16 November 1710

All 558 seats in the House of Commons 280 seats needed for a majority
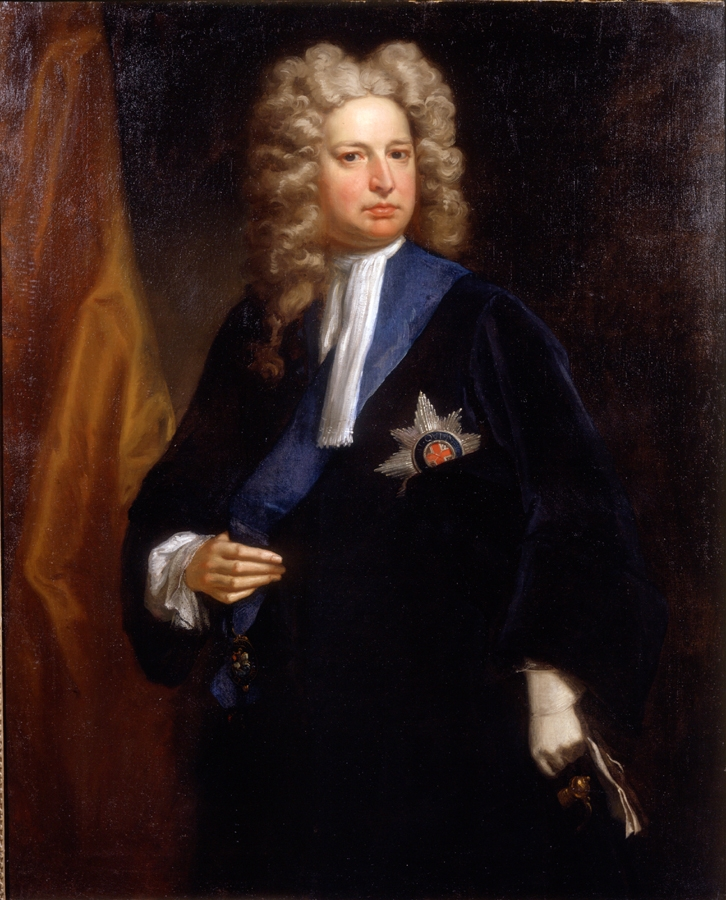

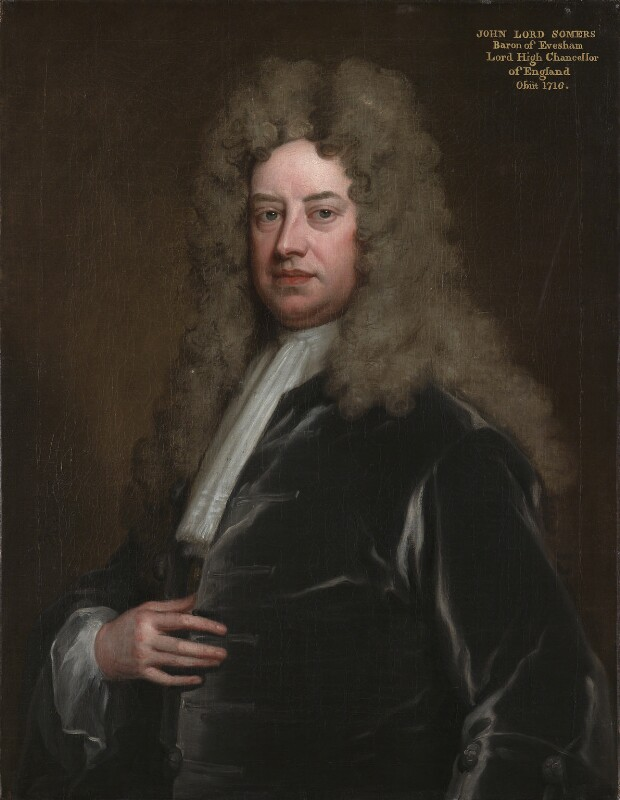

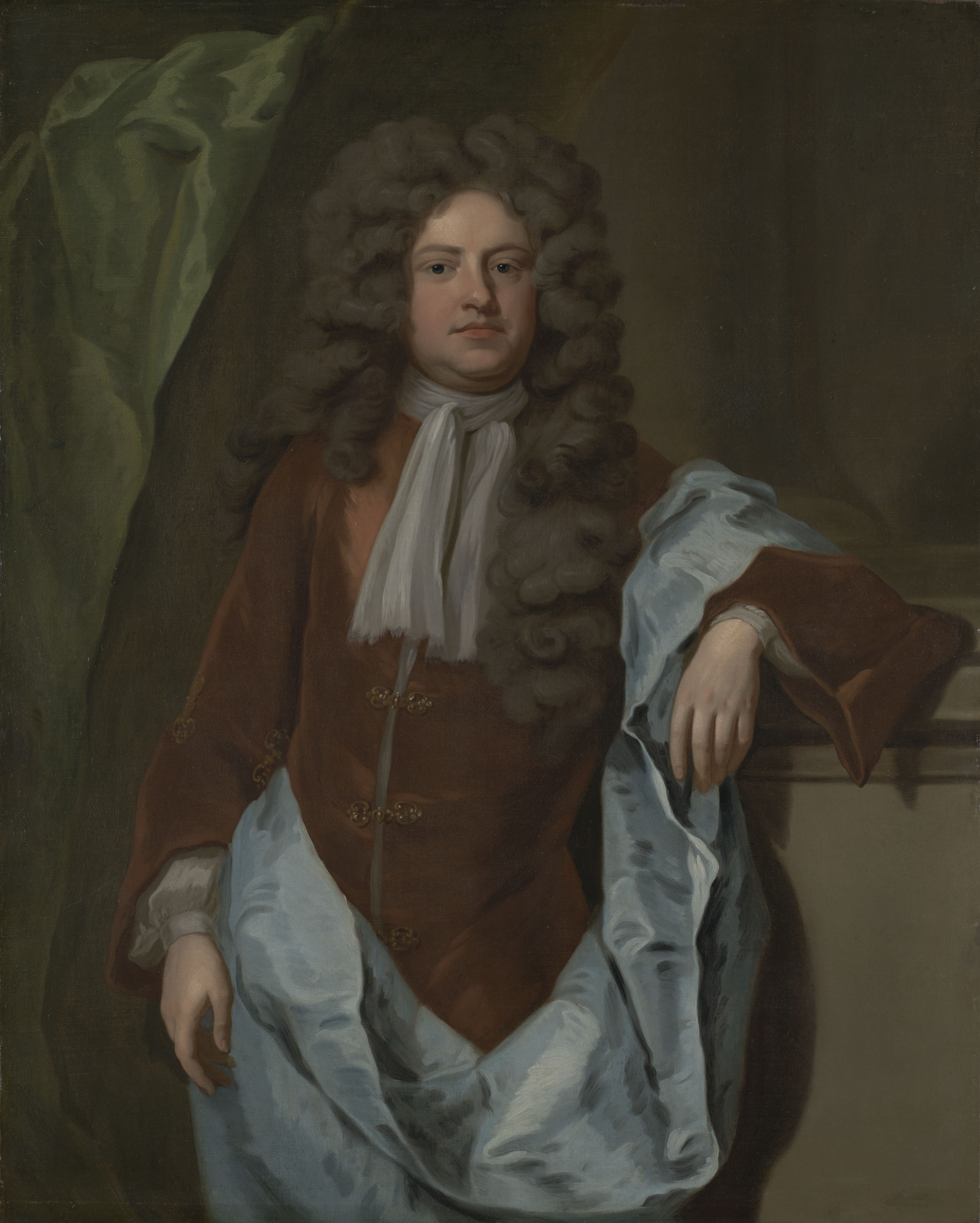

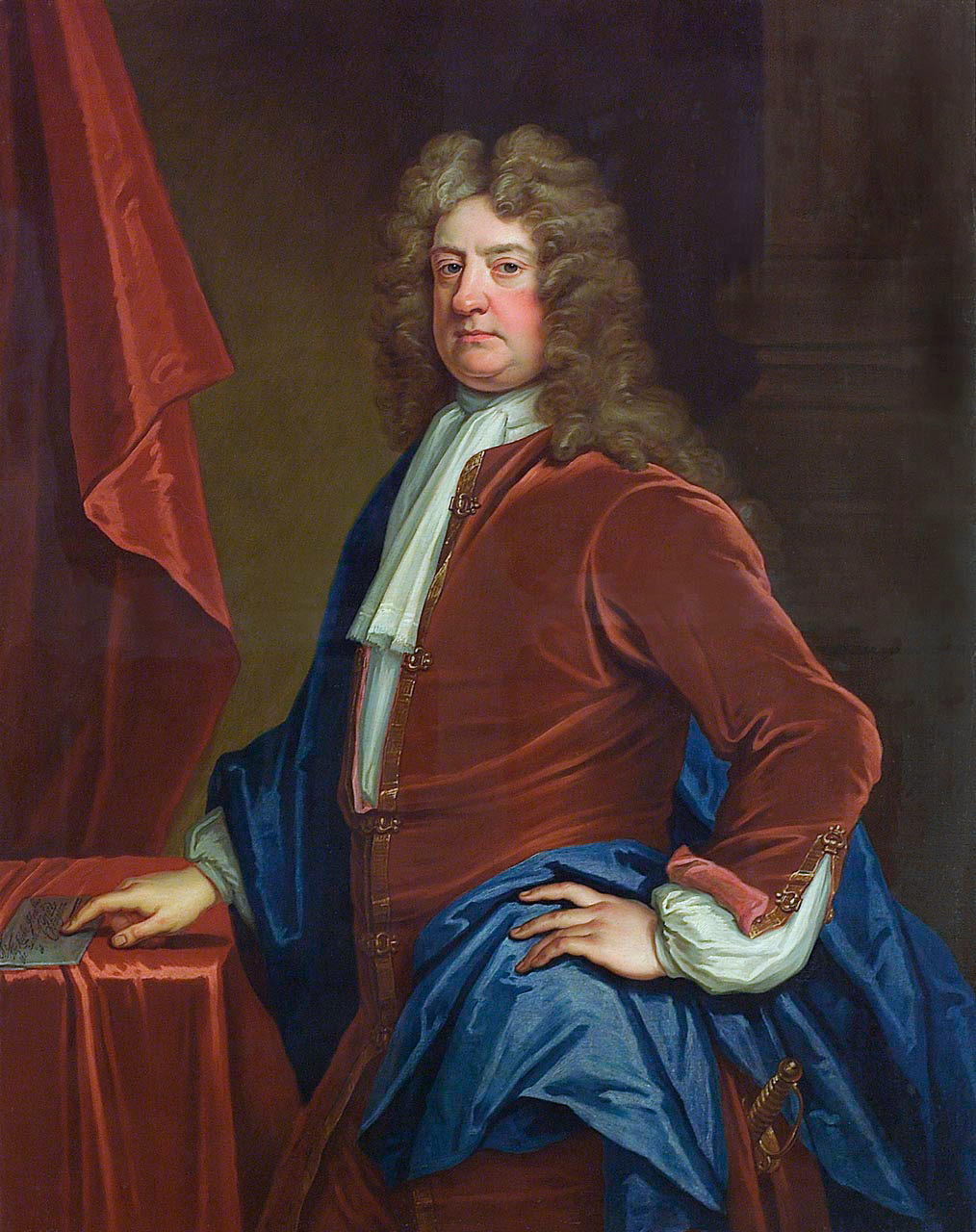
	First party	Second party
Leader	Robert Harley	Whig Junto (Baron Somers, Baron Halifax, Earl of Wharton)
Party	Tory	Whig
Leader since	1710	c. 1695
Leader's seat	Radnor	—
Seats won	346	196
Seat change	▲124	▼95
- Composition of the House of Commons after the election

The 1710 British general election produced a landslide victory for the Tories. The election came in the wake of the prosecution of Henry Sacheverell, which had led to the collapse of the previous government led by Godolphin and the Whig Junto.

In November 1709 the clergyman Henry Sacheverell had delivered a sermon fiercely criticising the government's policy of toleration for Protestant dissenters and attacking the personal conduct of the ministers. The government had Sacheverell impeached, and he was narrowly found guilty but received only a light sentence, making the government appear weak and vindictive. The trial enraged a large section of the population, and riots in London led to attacks on dissenting places of worship and cries of "Church in Danger".

The government's unpopularity was further increased by its enthusiasm for the war with France, as peace talks with the French king Louis XIV had broken down over the government's insistence that the Bourbons hand over the Spanish throne to the Habsburgs. The Tories' policy of pursuing peace appealed to a country worn out by constant war. Queen Anne, disliking the Junto and sensing that the government could not survive long, gradually replaced it with a Tory ministry throughout the summer of 1710.

The election was bitterly contested in almost all the counties and "open" boroughs, even when a poll was not held. Contests occurred in 131 constituencies in England and Wales; approximately half of all English and Welsh constituencies.

The overwhelming Tory victory surprised few, and following the election most remaining Whigs resigned from office. The new government was led by the moderate Tory Robert Harley who was unpopular among the more partisan Tories, who went on to form the October Club. Harley's ministry faced increasing pressure from the extremists whose position in Parliament had been enormously strengthened by the result.

== Summary of the constituencies ==
See 1796 British general election for details. The constituencies used were the same throughout the existence of the Parliament of Great Britain.

== Dates of election ==
The general election was held between 2 October 1710 and 16 November 1710. At this period elections did not take place at the same time in every constituency. The returning officer in each county or parliamentary borough fixed the precise date (see hustings for details of the conduct of the elections).

== Results ==

=== Seats summary ===
Parliamentary seats
Tory	63.8%
Whig	36.2%

== See also ==
- 3rd Parliament of Great Britain
- List of MPs elected in the British general election, 1710
- List of parliaments of Great Britain
