= 2nd Parliament of Queen Anne =

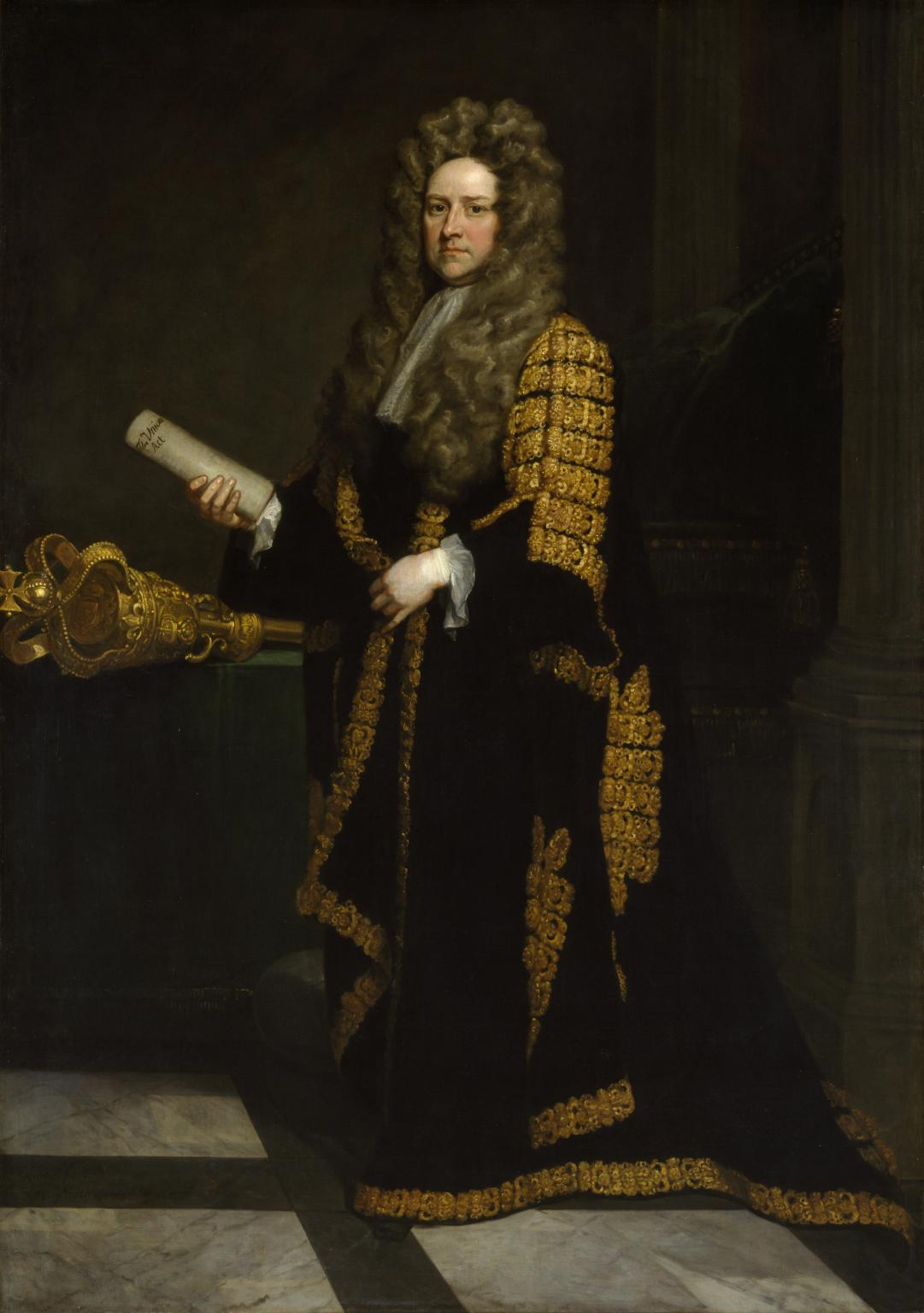
Portrait of John Smith by Godfrey Kneller. Smith was elected Speaker

Composition of the House of Commons.

The 2nd Parliament of Queen Anne was summoned by Queen Anne of England on 2 May 1705 and assembled on 14 July 1705. Its composition was 260 Tories, 233 Whigs and 20 others but in practice the House was evenly divided. 151 (26 per cent) of the MPs had no previous parliamentary experience. John Smith, the member for Andover, was elected Speaker of the House of Commons.

By the second session (December 1706 to April 1707) the Union with Scotland Act 1706 was ready for royal assent, which was duly received on 6 March 1707 during the third session. On 29 April 1707, after the session had ended, a proclamation was issued to declare that the present Parliament would henceforth be known as the ‘First Parliament of Great Britain’. In another proclamation on 5 June, Anne listed the Scottish members (16 peers and 45 commissioners) by name who would join their English counterparts in the respective British assemblies and, without issuing new writs of summons, the Queen scheduled the First Parliament of Great Britain to "meet and be holden" on 23 October 1707.

The details of the fourth session which duly convened on 23 October 1707 are described under First Parliament of Great Britain.

== See also ==
- List of acts of the 1st session of the 2nd Parliament of Queen Anne
- List of acts of the 2nd session of the 2nd Parliament of Queen Anne
- List of parliaments of England
