= 1708 British general election =

First election held after the Acts of Union 1707

- 30 April – 7 July 1708

All 558 seats in the House of Commons 280 seats needed for a majority
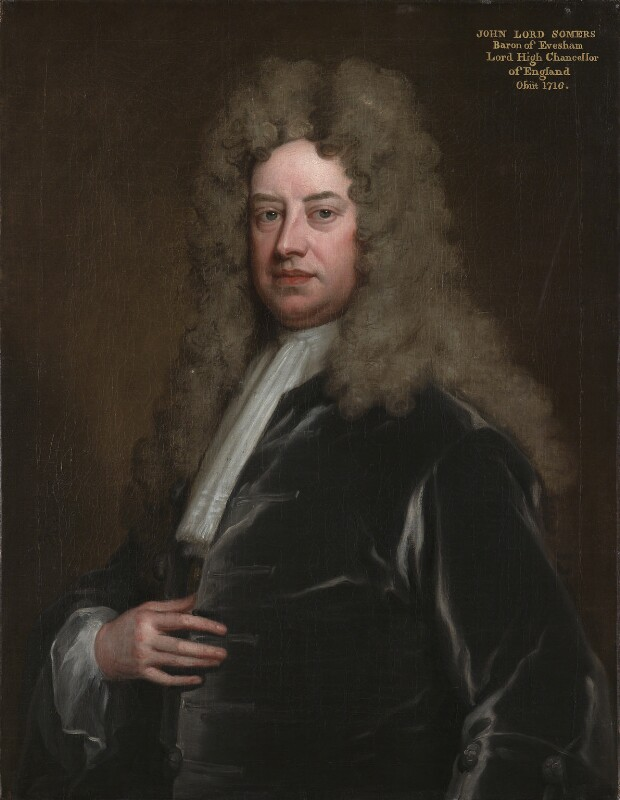

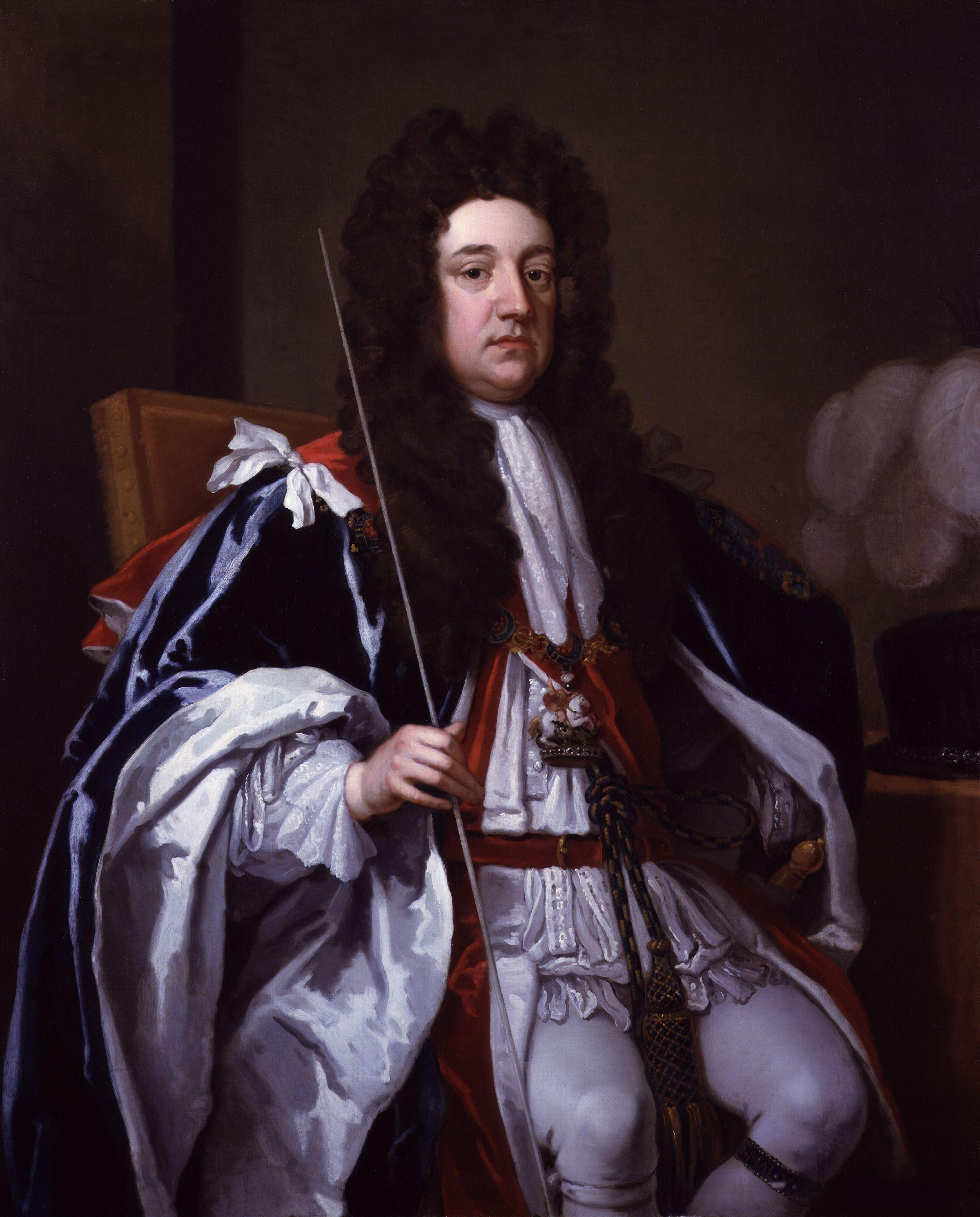
	First party	Second party
Leader	Lord Somers	Earl of Godolphin
Party	Whig	Tory
Leader since	c. 1695	c. 1707
Seats won	268	225
Seat change	▲45	▼45
- The House of Commons following the 1708 General Election

The 1708 British general election was the first general election to be held after the Acts of Union had united the Parliaments of England and Scotland.

The election saw the Whigs gain a majority in the House of Commons, and by November the Whig-dominated parliament had succeeded in pressuring the Queen into accepting the Whig Junto into government for the first time since the late 1690s. The Whigs only able to take partial control of the government, however, owing to the continued presence of the moderate Tory Godolphin in the cabinet (as Lord High Treasurer) and the opposition of the Queen. Contests were held in 95 of the 269 English and Welsh constituencies and 28 of the 45 Scottish constituencies.

Following the election, Whig MP Lord Somers was appointed as Lord President of the Council. However, moderate Tory Lord Godolphin remained as Lord High Treasurer and the Godolphin–Marlborough ministry remained in place.

== Summary of the constituencies ==
In England, there were 513 MPs elected from 245 constituencies (203 boroughs, 40 counties, and 2 universities). In Wales, there were 24 MPs from 24 constituencies. In Scotland, there were 45 MPs from 45 constituencies (30 counties and 15 burghs).

== Dates of election ==
The first general election held since the Union took place between 30 April 1708 and 7 July 1708. At this period elections did not take place at the same time in every constituency. The returning officer in each county or borough fixed the precise date (see hustings for details of the conduct of the elections).

== Results ==

In England and Wales, the Whigs took 268 seats and the Tories took 225, with 20 unclassified. The 45 in Scotland could be classified as ministerial supporters.

=== Seats summary ===
Parliamentary seats
Whig	56.7%
Tory	43.3%

== See also ==
- List of parliaments of Great Britain
- 2nd Parliament of Great Britain
- List of MPs elected in the British general election, 1708
