= Godolphin–Marlborough ministry =

English ministers during the reign of Queen Anne

- 1702-1710
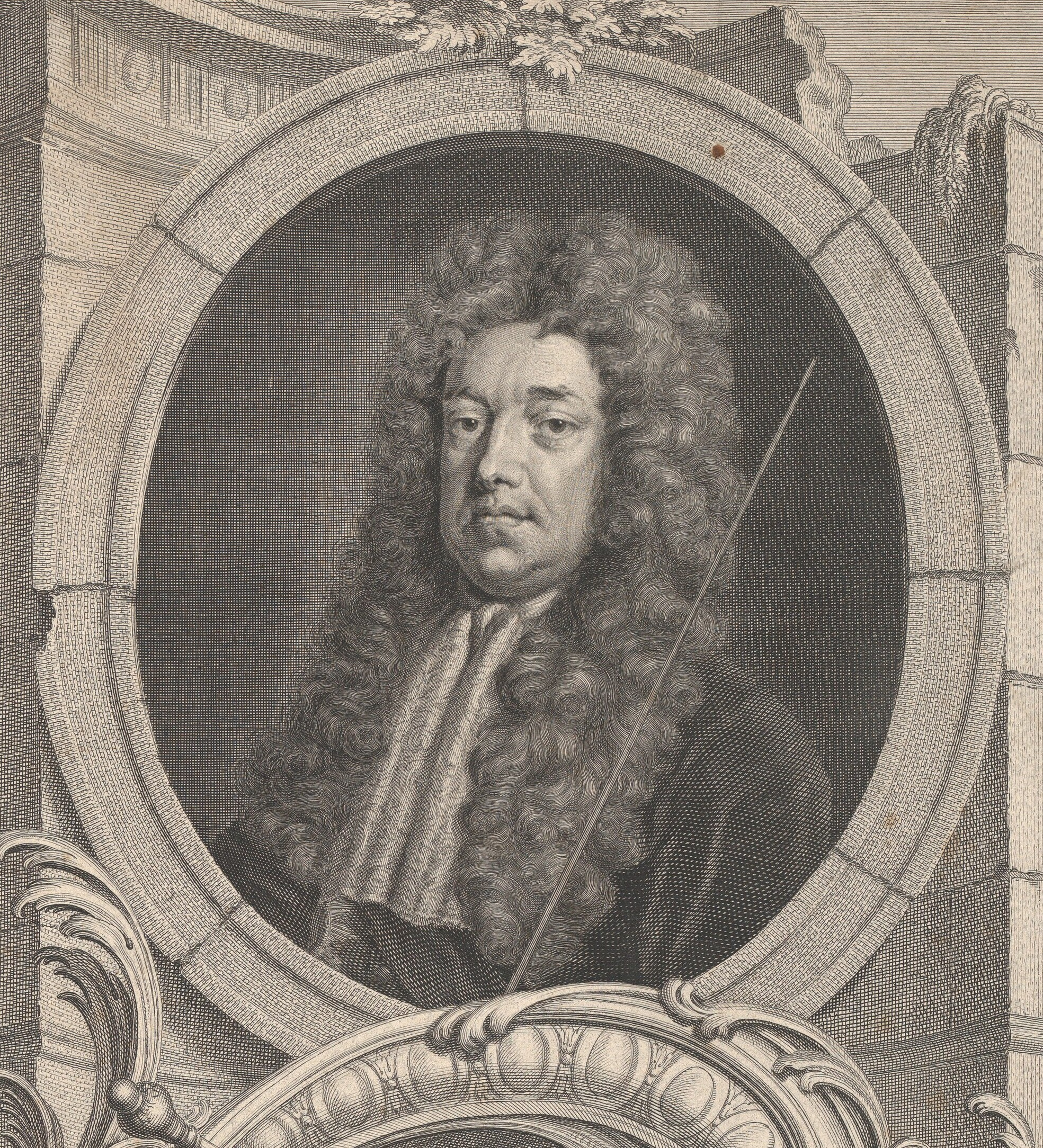
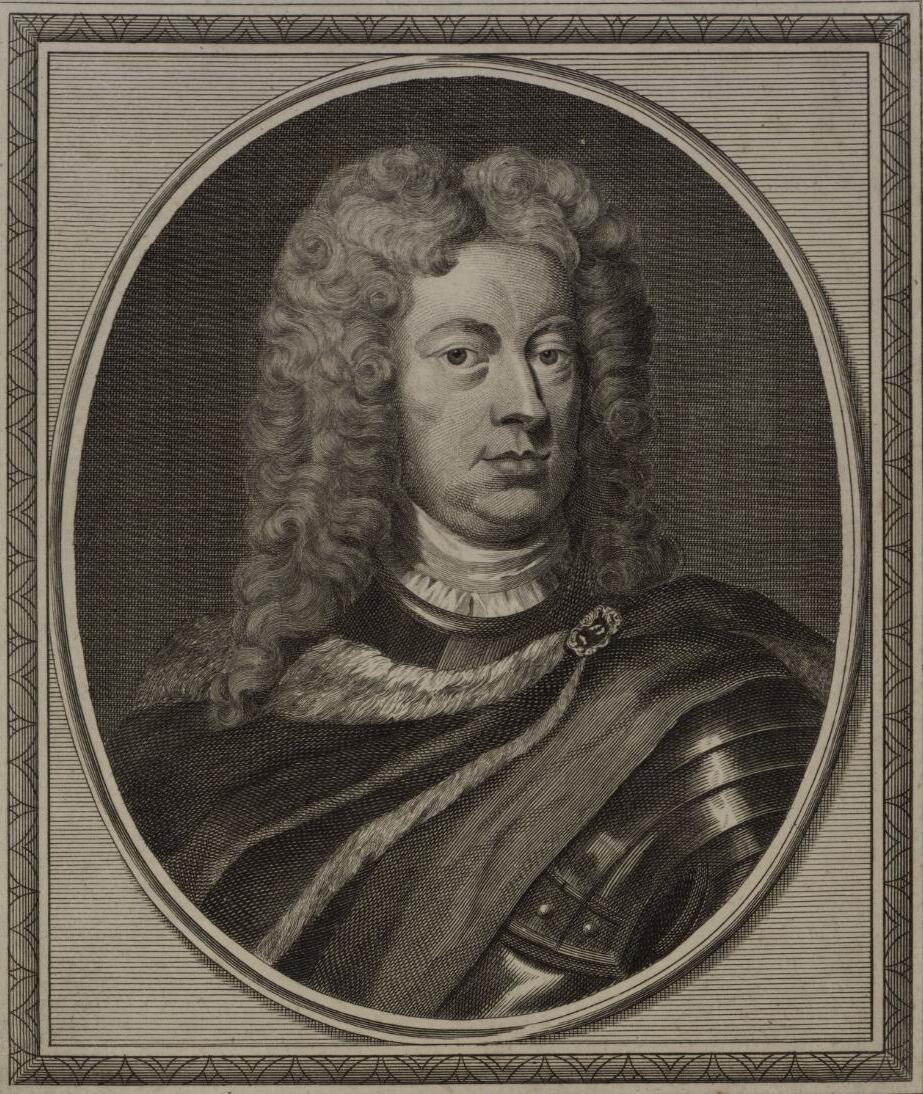
- Engravings of Lord Godolphin (left) and the Duke of Marlborough (right)
- Date formed: May 1702; 324 years ago
- Date dissolved: August 8, 1710; 316 years ago

People and organisations
- Monarch: Anne
- Lord High Treasurer: Sidney Godolphin, 1st Earl of Godolphin
- Master-General of the Ordnance: John Churchill, 1st Duke of Marlborough
- Member party: Tory; Whigs
- Status in legislature: Majority coalition (England, and GB after 1707); Outside of Parliament (Scotland)
- Opposition cabinet: None

History
- Elections: England: 1702; 1705; Scotland: 1702; Great Britain: 1708
- Legislature terms: 1st Parliament of Queen Anne (England); 1702-1707 Scottish Parliament (Scotland); 1st British Parliament (after 1707)
- Predecessor: Junto Tory ministry
- Successor: Harley ministry

This is a list of the principal Ministers of the Crown of the Kingdom of England, and then of the Kingdom of Great Britain, from May 1702, at the beginning of the reign of Queen Anne. During this period, the leaders of the ministry were Lord Godolphin and the Duke of Marlborough.

On 8 August 1710 Godolphin was dismissed and the Harley ministry took power.

== History ==
Upon Queen Anne's accession to the English throne in 1702, she appointed Lord Godolphin as Lord High Treasurer and the Duke of Marlborough as Master-General of the Ordnance (among other numerous appointments). They would lead this coalition of Tories and Whigs until 1708, one year after the Act of Union formed the Kingdom of Great Britain. There were three phases to the ministry. From 1702 to 1704 the ministry was largely Tory – Godolphin and Marlborough themselves were Tories, as were the Earl of Nottingham and Sir Charles Hedges, the Secretaries of State.

After Nottingham's resignation in 1704, Godolphin and Marlborough turned for support to the "Country" Whigs, led by Speaker Robert Harley. Not long after, the Whig complexion of the ministry grew, as Godolphin sought the support of Harley's opponents, the second Whig Junto, bringing the Earl of Sunderland in to replace Hedges as Secretary of State in 1706, and other Junto allies like Sir William Cowper began to be appointed to positions of power. The leading ministers looked favourably on the Junto's strong support for the War of the Spanish Succession.

Harley at this point began to turn against the ministry and towards the opposition Tories, and his resignation in 1708 left the government largely in the hands of the Junto for its last two years, with Sunderland as Secretary of State, Lord Somers as Lord President of the Council, the Earl of Orford as First Lord of the Admiralty, and the Earl of Wharton as Lord Lieutenant of Ireland. The ministry finally collapsed in 1710 when Queen Anne turned to Harley and the Tories, dismissing Godolphin and the Junto Whigs, and, soon after, Marlborough himself.

== List of ministers ==
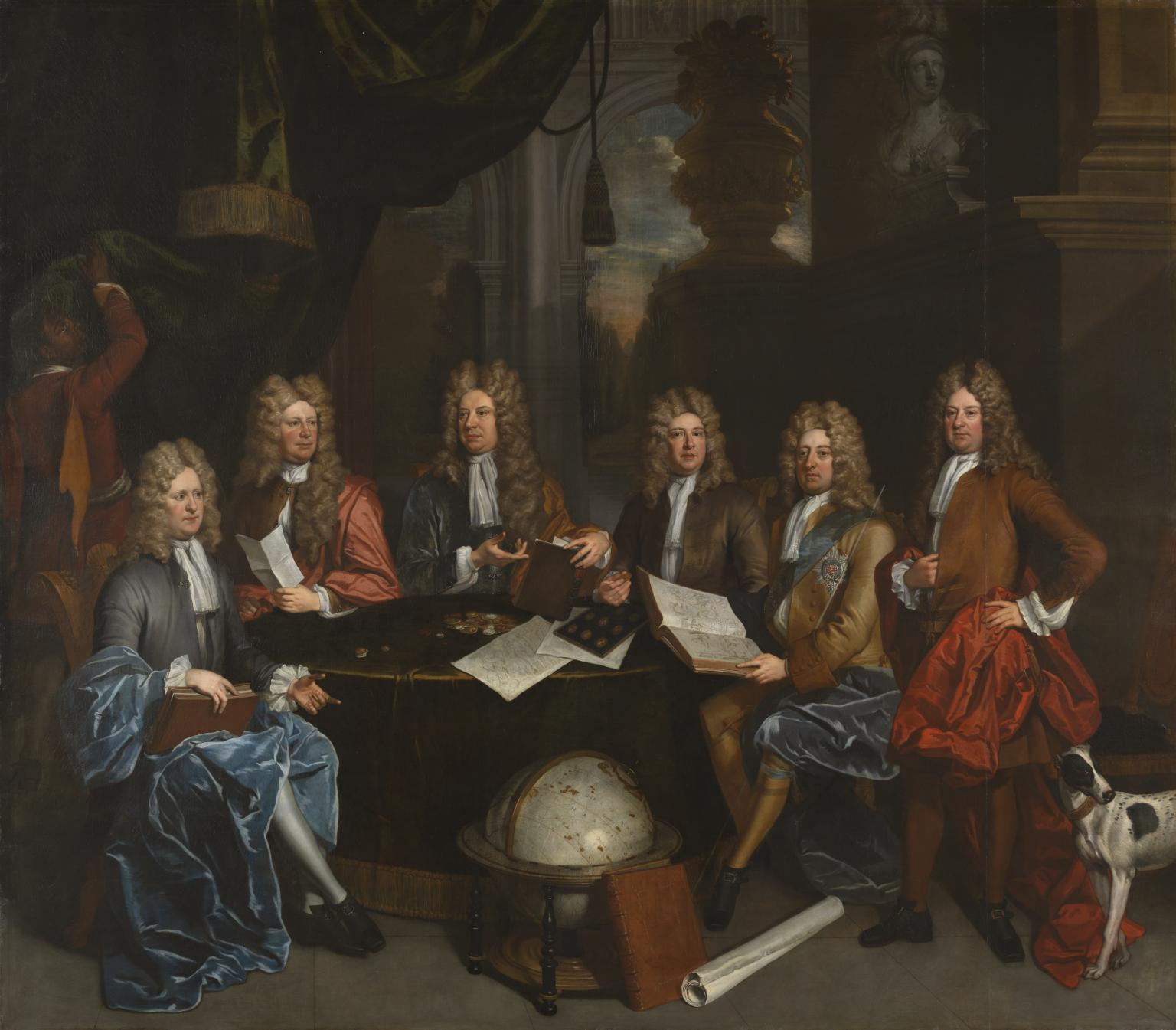
The Whig Junto by John James Baker, 1710. The leaders of the second Whig Junto painted the year they fell from office.

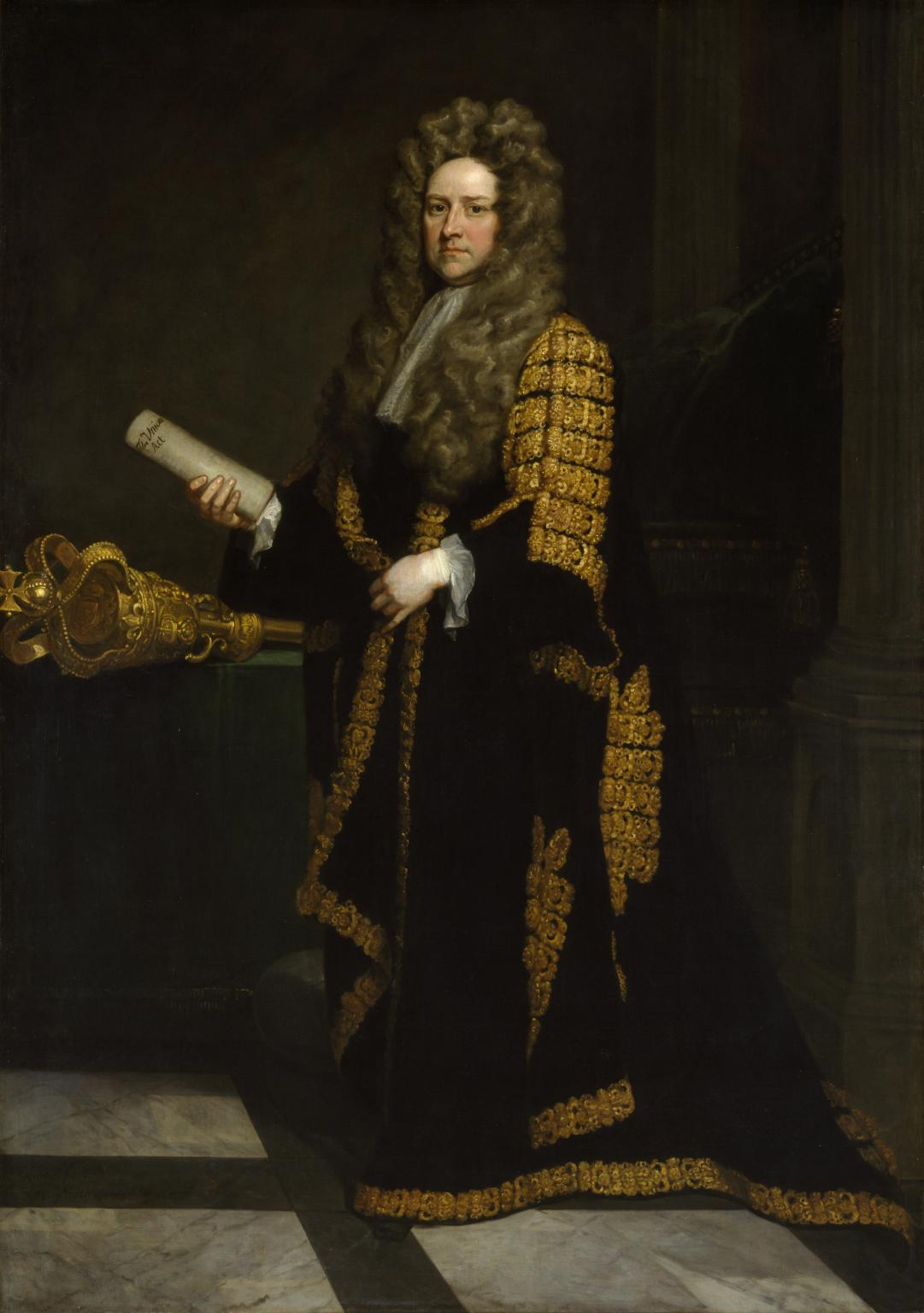
Portrait of John Smith by Godfrey Kneller. Smith, a former Speaker of the House of Commons, was Chancellor of the Exchequer from 1708

Office		Name	Appointed
First Lord of the Treasury		Sidney Godolphin, 1st Earl of Godolphin	8 May 1702
Chancellor of the Exchequer		Henry Boyle	29 March 1701
Chancellor of the Exchequer		John Smith	11 February 1708
Lord President of the Council		Thomas Herbert, 8th Earl of Pembroke and Montgomery	9 July 1702
Lord President of the Council		John Somers, 1st Baron Somers	25 November 1708
Chancellor of the Duchy of Lancaster		Sir John Leveson-Gower	12 May 1702
Chancellor of the Duchy of Lancaster		James Stanley, 10th Earl of Derby	1 June 1706
Master-General of the Ordnance		John Churchill, 1st Duke of Marlborough	1 July 1702
Secretary of State for the Southern Department		Daniel Finch, 2nd Earl of Nottingham	2 May 1702
Secretary of State for the Southern Department		Sir Charles Hedges	18 May 1704
Secretary of State for the Southern Department		Charles Spencer, 3rd Earl of Sunderland	3 December 1706
Secretary of State for the Southern Department		William Legge, 2nd Baron Dartmouth	15 June 1710
Secretary of State for the Northern Department		Sir Charles Hedges	2 May 1702
Secretary of State for the Northern Department		Robert Harley	18 May 1704
Secretary of State for the Northern Department		Henry Boyle	13 February 1708
Lord Privy Seal		John Sheffield, 1st Marquess of Normanby	27 April 1702
Lord Privy Seal		John Holles, 1st Duke of Newcastle-upon-Tyne	21 March 1705
President of the Board of Trade		Thomas Thynne, 1st Viscount Weymouth	12 June 1702
President of the Board of Trade		Thomas Grey, 2nd Earl of Stamford	25 April 1707
Lord High Admiral / First Lord of the Admiralty		Prince George of Denmark	20 May 1702
Lord High Admiral / First Lord of the Admiralty		Queen Anne	28 October 1708
Lord High Admiral / First Lord of the Admiralty		Thomas Herbert, 8th Earl of Pembroke	29 November 1708
Lord High Admiral / First Lord of the Admiralty		Edward Russell, 1st Earl of Orford	8 November 1709
Secretary at War		George Clarke	3 March 1692
Secretary at War		Henry St John	20 April 1704
Secretary at War		Robert Walpole	25 February 1708
Treasurer of the Navy		Sir Thomas Littleton, 3rd Baronet	29 May 1699
Treasurer of the Navy		Robert Walpole	21 January 1710
Paymaster of the Forces	at Home	John Howe	4 January 1703
Paymaster of the Forces	Abroad	Charles Fox	4 January 1703
Paymaster of the Forces	Abroad	James Brydges	April 1705
Secretary of State for Scotland		John Erskine, Earl of Mar	1 May 1707
Secretary of State for Scotland		James Douglas, 2nd Duke of Queensberry	3 February 1709

== See also ==
- 1st Parliament of Great Britain 1705–1708
- 2nd Parliament of Great Britain 1708–1710

Preceded by Junto Tory ministry	Government of England; 1702–1707	Acts of Union
First Acts of Union	Government of Great Britain; 1707–1710	Succeeded by Harley ministry
