= 1713 British general election =

Election in Great Britain

- 22 August – 12 November 1713

All 558 seats in the House of Commons 280 seats needed for a majority
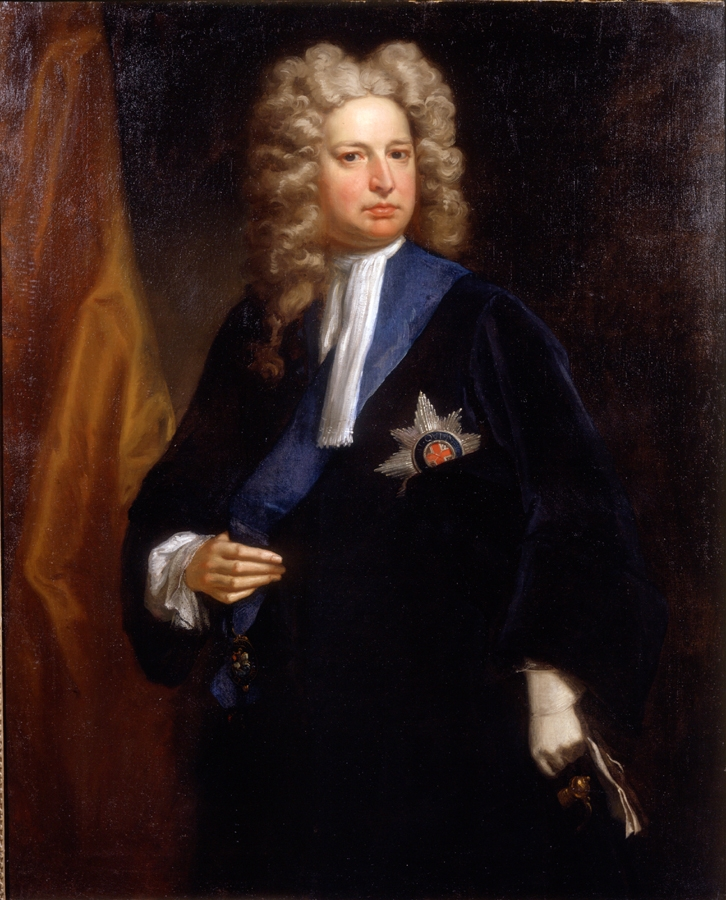

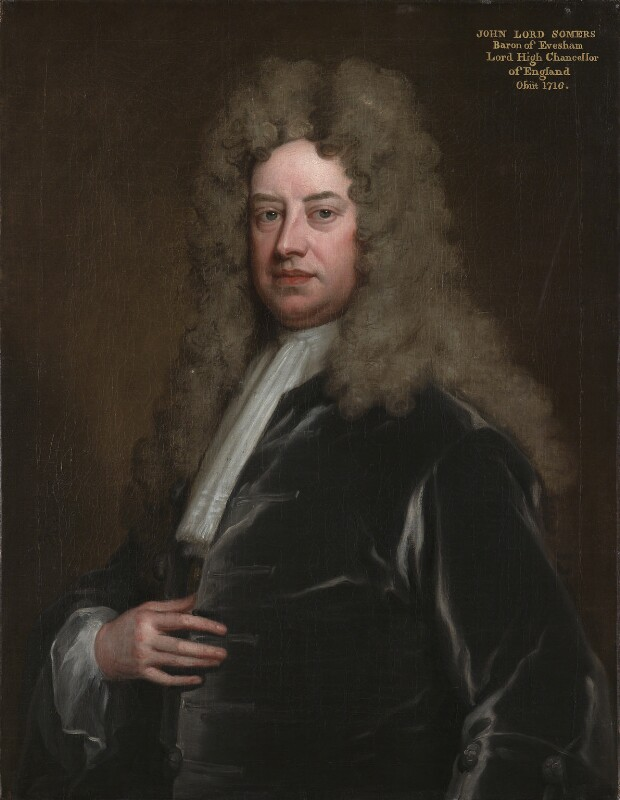

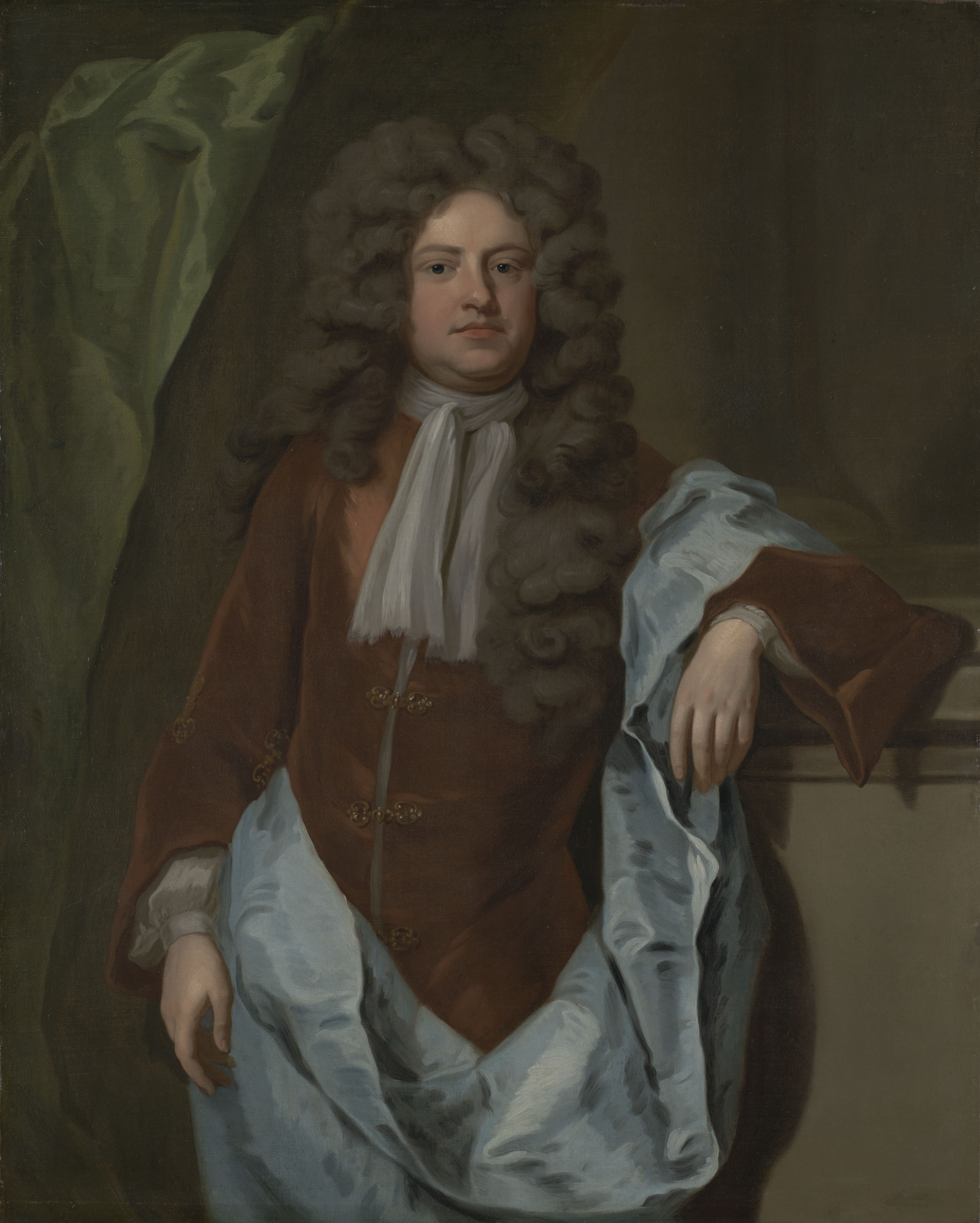

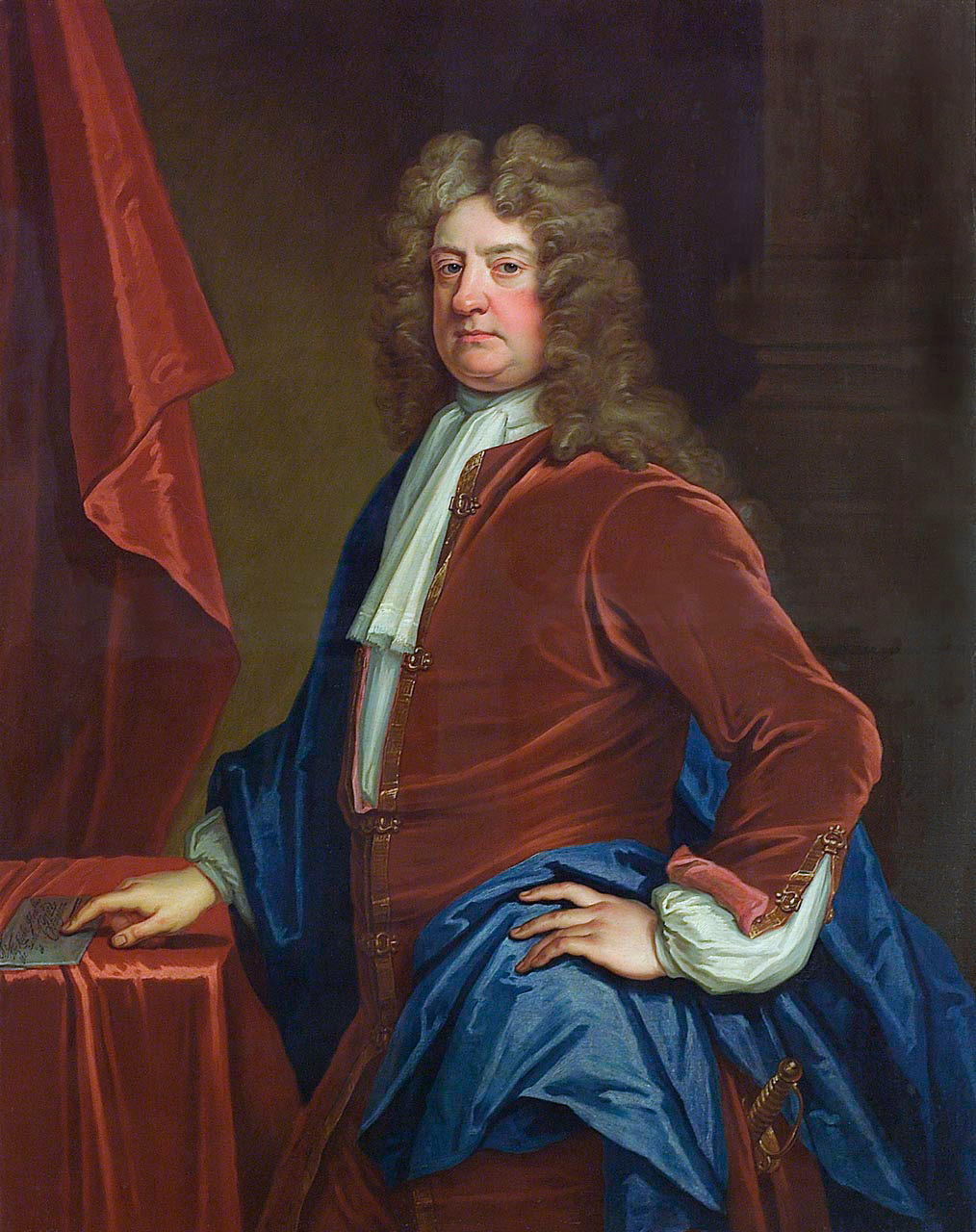
	First party	Second party
Leader	Earl of Oxford and Earl Mortimer	Whig Junto (Baron Somers, Baron Halifax, Earl of Wharton)
Party	Tory	Whig
Leader since	1710	c. 1695
Seats won	369	161
Seat change	▲23	▼35
- Composition of the House of Commons after the election

The 1713 British general election was held on 22 August 1713 to 12 November 1713, to elect members of the House of Commons, the lower house of the Parliament of Great Britain. It produced further gains for the governing Tory party. Since 1710 Robert Harley had led a government appointed after the downfall of the Whig Junto, attempting to pursue a moderate and non-controversial policy, but had increasingly struggled to deal with the extreme Tory backbenchers who were frustrated by the lack of support for anti-dissenter legislation. The government remained popular with the electorate, however, having entered into peace negotiations ending the War of the Spanish Succession and later agreeing on the Treaty of Utrecht. The Tories consequently made further gains against the Whigs, making Harley's job even more difficult. Contests were held in 94 constituencies in England and Wales, some 35 per cent of the total, reflecting a decline in partisan tension and the Whigs' belief that they were unlikely to win anyway.

== Summary of the constituencies ==
See 1796 British general election for details. The constituencies used were the same throughout the existence of the Parliament of Great Britain.

== Dates of election ==
The general election was held between 22 August 1713 and 12 November 1713. At this period elections did not take place at the same time in every constituency. The returning officer in each county or parliamentary borough fixed the precise date (see hustings for details of the conduct of the elections).

== Results ==

=== Seats summary ===
Parliamentary seats
Tory	64.2%
Whig	35.8%

Country	Tories	Whigs	Total Members
England	323	166	489
Wales	21	3	24
Scotland	14	31	45
Total	358	200	558

== See also ==
- List of MPs elected in the British general election, 1713
- 4th Parliament of Great Britain
- List of parliaments of Great Britain
