= Chippenham Park =

Country house in Cambridgeshire, England

Coordinates: 52.2968°N 0.4394°E

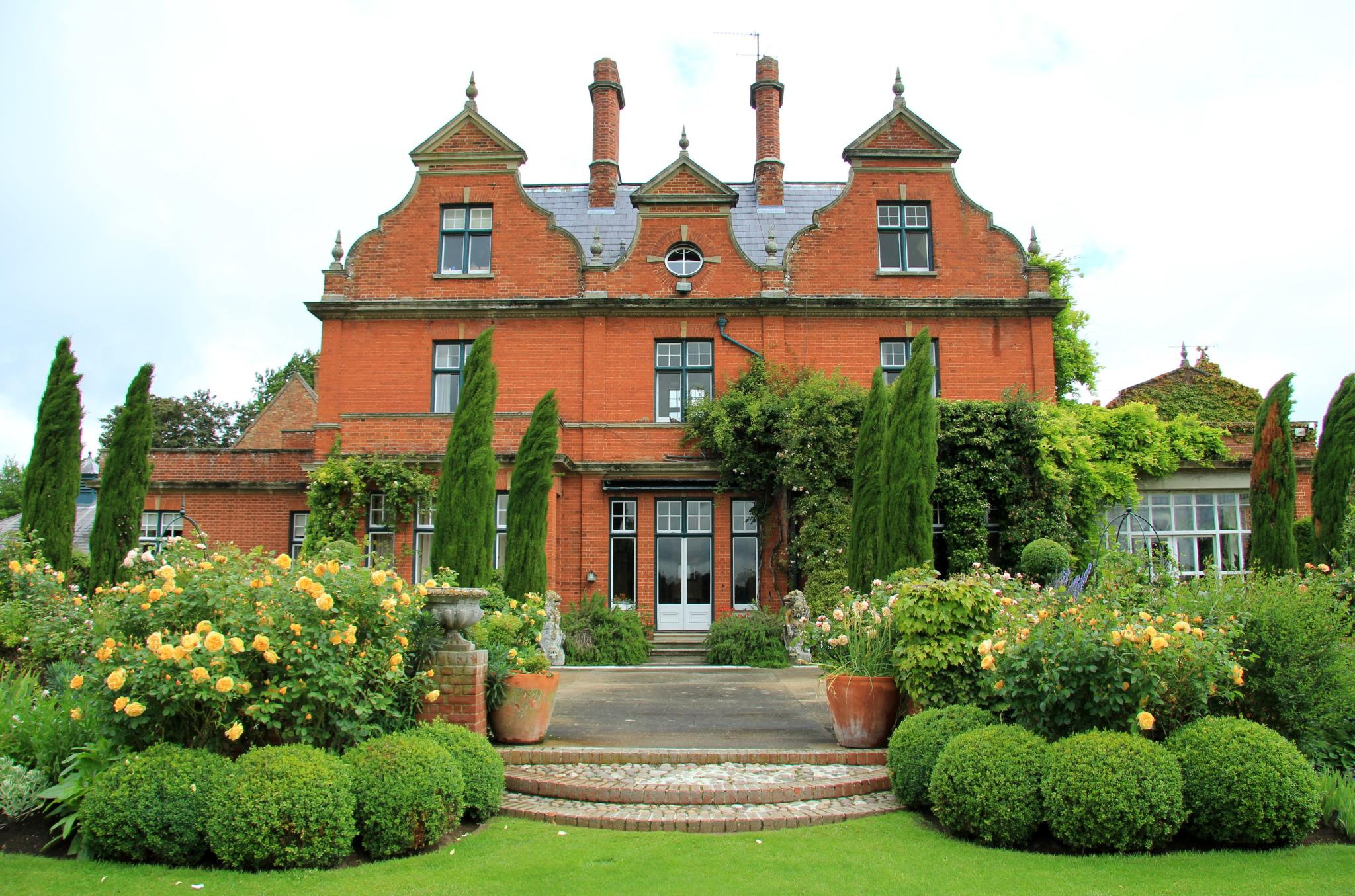
Chippenham Park

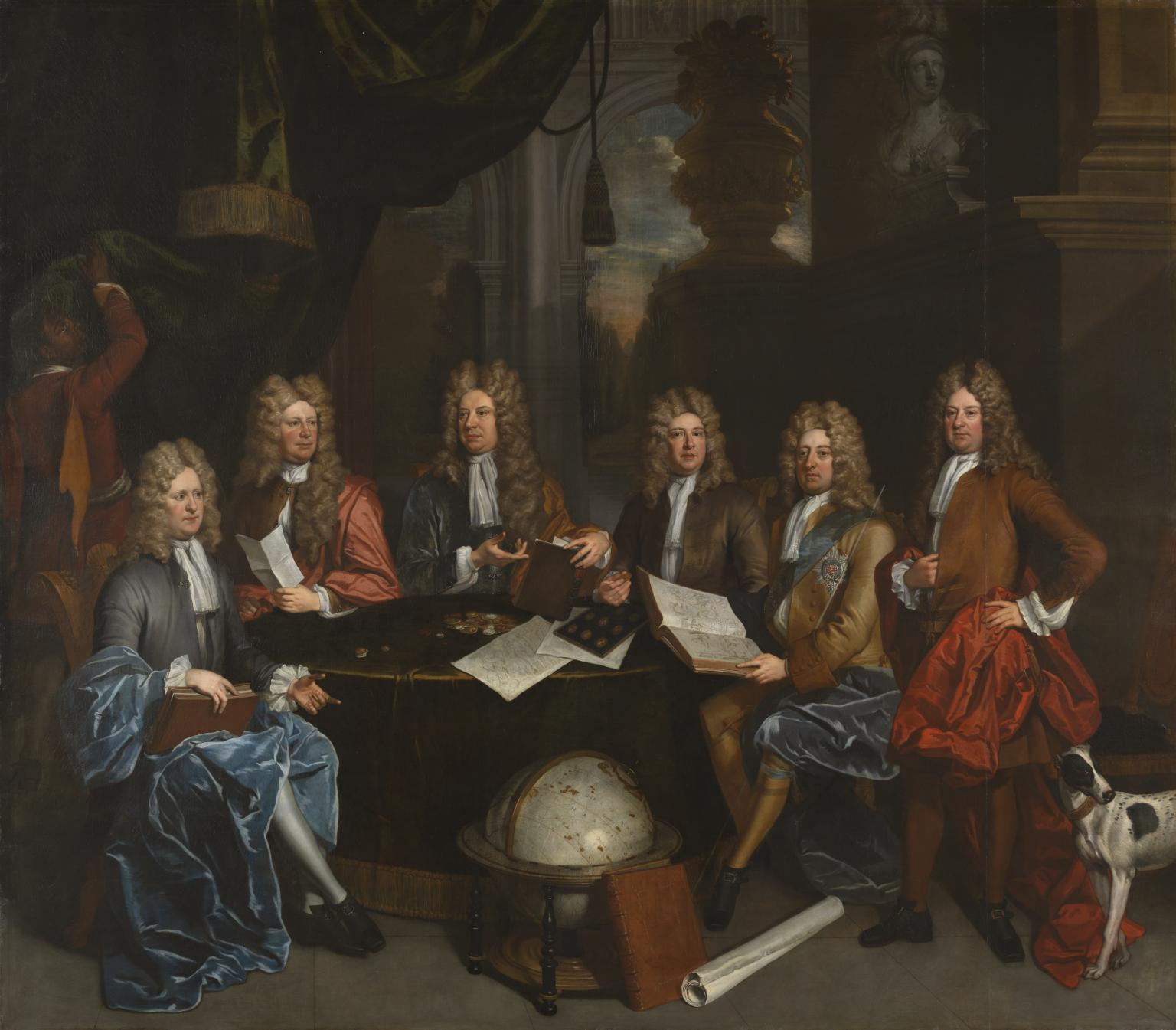
The Whig Junto by John James Baker, 1710. It was commissioned by a former owner of the house the Earl of Orford to hang there. Today it is in the Tate Britain in London.

Chippenham Park is a country house in Chippenham, Cambridgeshire.

== History ==
The Chippenham Park Estate was acquired by Thomas Revett, a London merchant, in 1558. It passed to the Russell family around 1600 and the present house was commissioned by Edward Russell, 1st Earl of Orford in 1689. It was acquired by John Tharp in 1791 and remained in the ownership of the Tharp family until 1948 when it inherited by a nephew Basil Bacon. It remained in the Bacon family until it was inherited by Mr and Mrs Eustace Crawley in 1985. The house is now a wedding venue.
