= The Whig Junto =

1710 painting by Godfrey Kneller

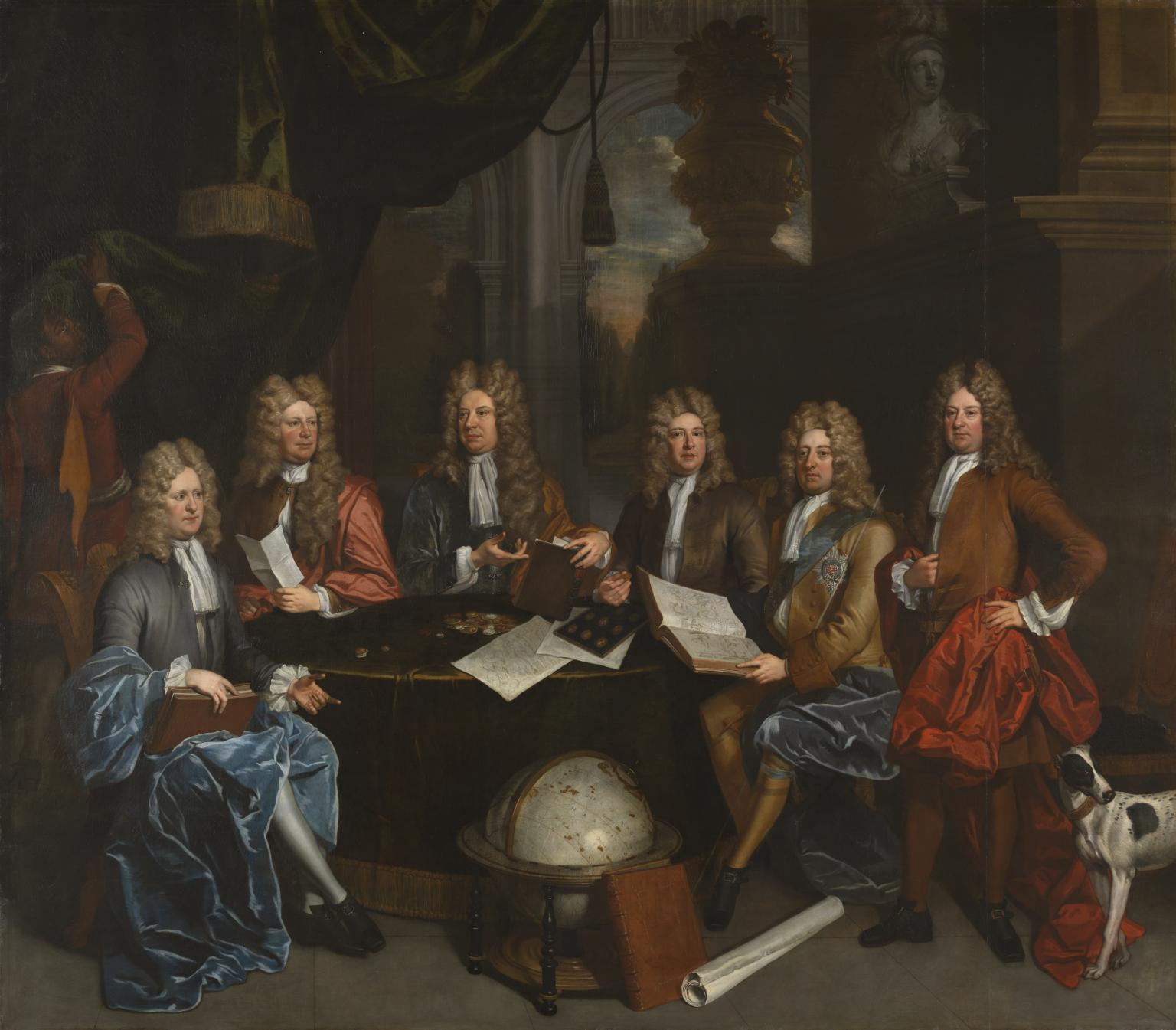
- Artist: John James Baker
- Year: 1710
- Type: Oil on canvas, portrait
- Dimensions: 319 cm × 346.9 cm (126 in × 136.6 in)
- Location: Tate Britain, London

The Whig Junto is a 1710 oil painting by the artist John James Baker. It features a group portrait of members of the Whig Junto, a leading group of Whig British politicians during the reign of Queen Anne. They were in power at the time they sat for Baker. The Whigs had vigorously prosecuted the War of the Spanish Succession against France, with notable victories under the command of the Duke of Marlborough. In the year of the painting, they were toppled from power by the rival Tories led by Robert Harley, who signed the Treaty of Utrecht ending the war. Only the Hanoverian Succession of 1714 led to the Whig return to power and enabled them to Impeach Harley.

== Sitters ==
Seated from left to right it depicts the Earl of Sunderland, the Marquess of Wharton, Lord Somers, the Earl of Halifax and the Duke of Devonshire. Halifax was a driving force behind the creation of the Bank of England in 1694. He and the others were drawn from the landed aristocracy and had held a variety of roles government. Standing on the right is Admiral Edward Russell, 1st Earl of Orford, who commissioned the painting, and was best known for his victory over the French Navy at the Battle of La Hogue in 1692, forestalling a planned invasion of Britain by Jacibites. The identity of the black figure on the left is unknown. Artistus and studios often hired black models for paintings during the era.

Baker was likely a Flemish and had worked as assistant to Godfrey Kneller. The painting was likely intended for Orford's country residence Chippenham Park in Cambridgeshire. It is the only known group portrait of the Junto. Today it is part of the collection of Tate Britain in Pimlico, having been acquired in 2018 by the government in acceptance in lieu of inheritance tax and allocated to the gallery.

== Bibliography ==
- Barber, Tabitha and Bachelor, Tim. British Baroque: Power and Illusion. Tate Britain, 2020.
- Bucholz, Robert & Key, Newton. Early Modern England 1485-1714: A Narrative History. John Wiley & Sons, 2019
- Bullard, Rebecca. The Politics of Disclosure, 1674-1725: Secret History Narratives. Routledge, 2015.
- Hall, Simon. The Hutchinson Illustrated Encyclopedia of British History. Routledge, 2018.
