= Portrait of John Smith =

1708 painting by Godfrey Kneller

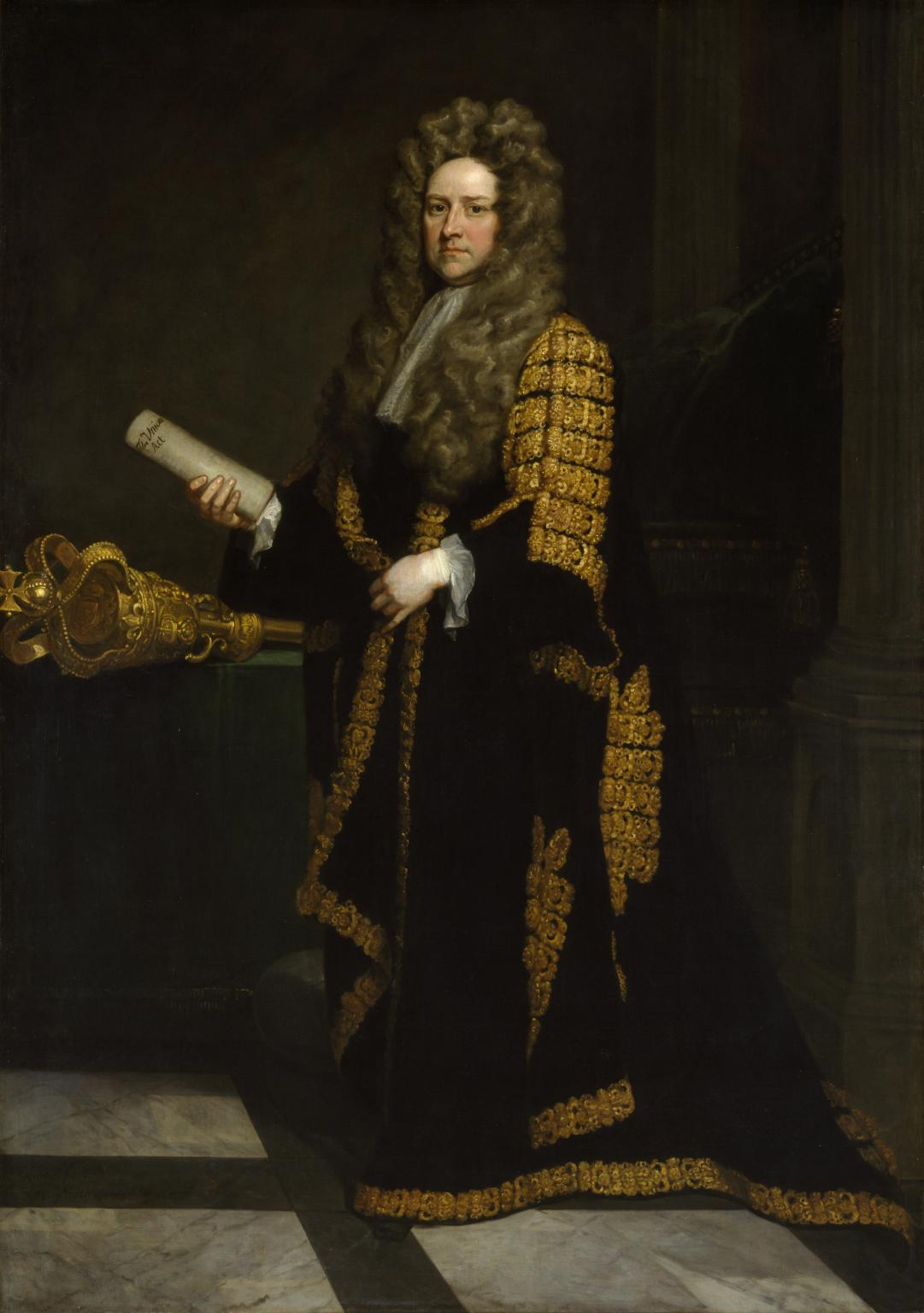
- Artist: Godfrey Kneller
- Year: c. 1708
- Type: Oil on canvas, portrait
- Dimensions: 220.5 cm × 156.5 cm (86.8 in × 61.6 in)
- Location: Tate Britain, London

Portrait of John Smith is a 1708 portrait painting by the German-British artist Godfrey Kneller depicting the English politician John Smith.

Smith was a Whig, who served as Chancellor of the Exchequer twice during the reign of Queen Anne. He was also Speaker of the House of Commons from 1705 to 1708, when he sat for Kneller. He is depicted in full-length in his robes of office as speaker and is shown holding a copy of the Act of Union that had created the Kingdom of Great Britain. The ceremonial mace symbolising the authority of the Parliament is displayed on the table behind him.

Kneller was Britain's leading portraitist of the era and depicted many of the prominent figures of the late Stuart and early Georgian eras. The painting is now in the collection of the Tate Britain, having been acquired in 1985.

== Bibliography ==
- Cullen, Fintan. The Irish Face: Redefining the Irish Portrait. National Portrait Gallery, 2004
- Smyth, Jim. Revolution, Counter-Revolution and Union: Ireland in the 1790s. Cambridge University Press, 2000.
