= Whig Junto =

English Whig cabal during the reigns of William III and Anne

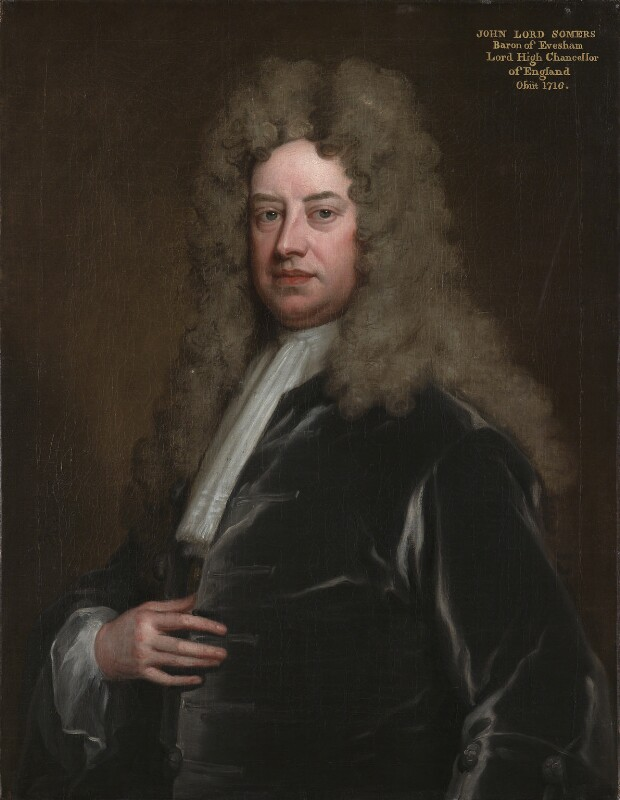
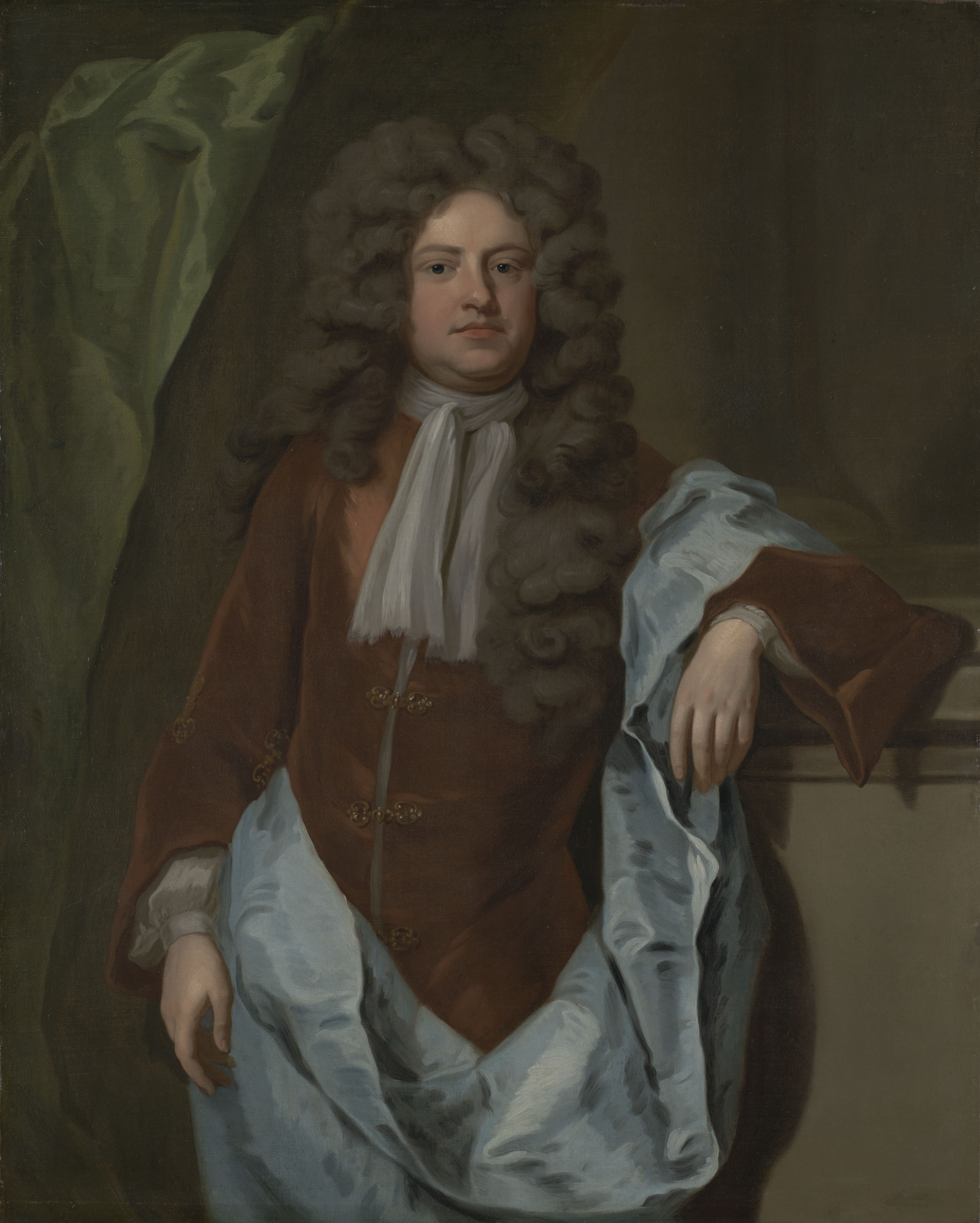
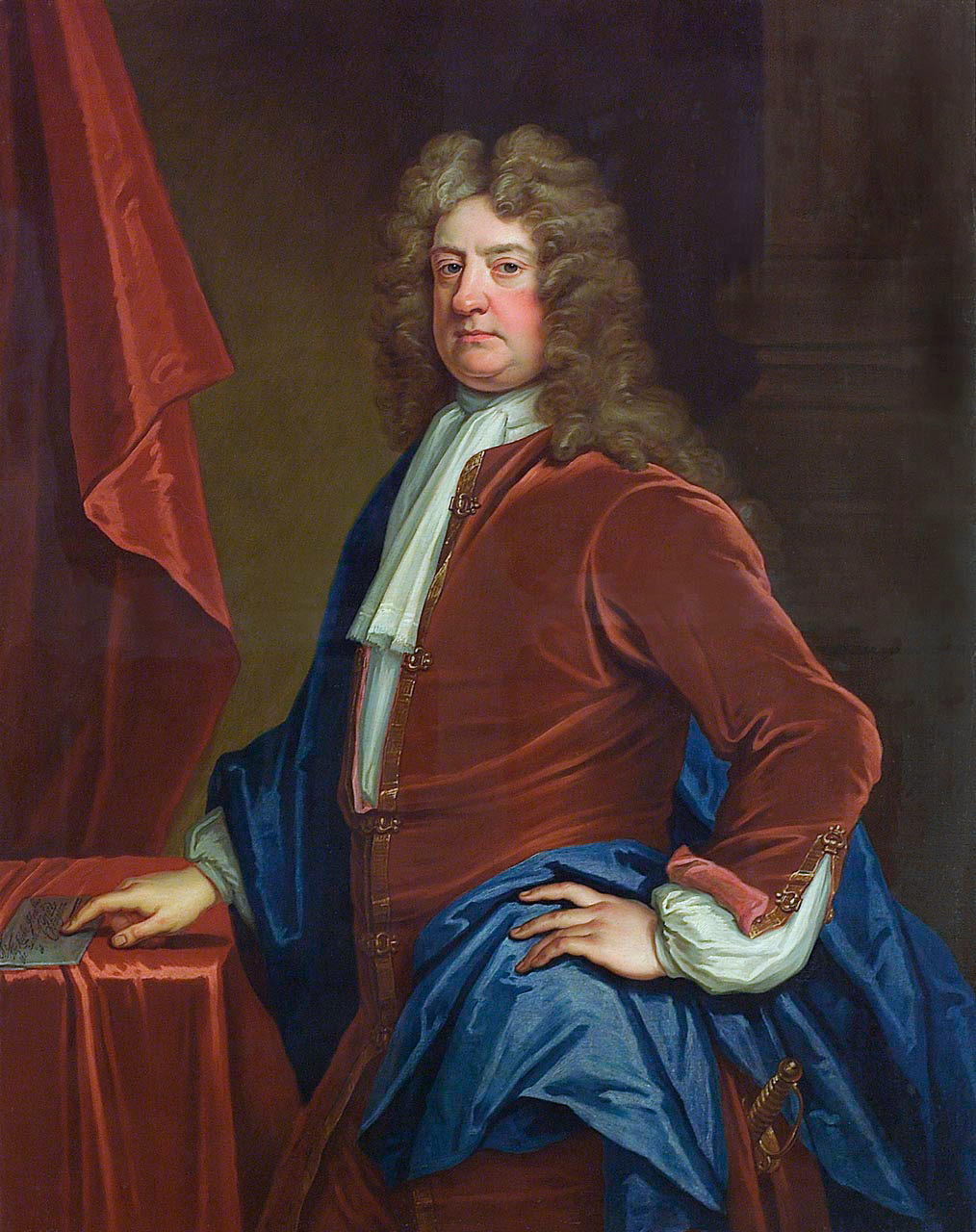
Three members of the Junto: from left to right, Lords:
Somers, Montagu/Halifax and Orford

The Whig Junto is the name given to a group of leading Whigs who were seen to direct the management of the Whig Party and often the government, during the reigns of William III and Anne.

The Whig Junto proper consisted of:

- John Somers, later Baron Somers;
- Charles Montagu, later Earl of Halifax;
- Thomas Wharton, later Marquess of Wharton
- Edward Russell, later Earl of Orford.

They came to prominence due to the favour of Robert Spencer, 2nd Earl of Sunderland, an important advisor to William III. After his death, support for the Junto continued under his son Charles Spencer, 3rd Earl of Sunderland. Opponents gave them the nickname "the five tyrannising lords". Other figures prominent around the edges of the Junto include Sir John Trenchard and Thomas Tollemache.

== Name ==
The term "Junto" (first attested in 1641) is derived from "junta", a Hispano-Portuguese term for a civil deliberative or administrative council. In 18th-century English, the term did not have its modern association with military dictatorships. The form "juncto" (after Latin junctum) was also used until about 1700.

== History ==
Somers, Wharton, Russell, and Montagu(e) (Note: The spelling in this generation of his family still varied.) were elected to the House of Commons in 1689 and were granted minor office. Their effectiveness in the Commons brought them to Sunderland's attention. The Junto began to dominate the ministry after the resignation of the Tory Secretary of State Lord Nottingham in 1693, communicating to the King and Sunderland through the Whig Secretary of State, Charles Talbot, Duke of Shrewsbury. As the members of the Junto entered the Lords (Somers was made Lord Keeper in 1693 and was promoted to a barony four years later, Wharton succeeded his father as Baron Wharton in 1696, Russell was created Earl of Orford in 1697, and Montagu was created Baron Halifax in 1700), their hold on the Commons weakened. By 1700, the Junto was largely out of power. In 1701 Somers, Orford, and Halifax were impeached but survived the attack, and late in the year the Junto seemed set to return to power in order to help the king rally support for the War of the Spanish Succession.

However, King William's death in March 1702 delayed their return: Queen Anne detested them and refused to include them in the ministry, which was instead dominated by High Tories, with whom her sympathies lay. With the elder Sunderland dead, the Junto's connection to his son, Charles — who was also the son-in-law of the Queen's favourite couple, the Duke and Duchess of Marlborough — proved useful, as did the Junto's support of the war, which contrasted with Tory ambivalence towards it.

In 1705 Somers's protégé Lord Cowper, whom the Queen liked and trusted, was made Lord Keeper and in 1706 Sunderland became a Secretary of State, even though the Queen disliked him even more than she did the rest of the Junto. After the resignation of Harley in 1708, Marlborough and his ally the Lord Treasurer Godolphin became more and more dependent on the Junto, who returned to office with Somers as Lord President, Wharton as Lord Lieutenant of Ireland, and Orford as First Lord of the Admiralty.

The ministry's increasing dependence on the Junto Whigs caused the Queen's relationship with the Marlboroughs and Godolphin to sour. In 1710, Godolphin and the Junto Whigs were forced from power. The Junto led opposition to the new ministry's peace policy from the House of Lords, leading to the creation of new peers to prevent this opposition from voting down the peace treaty.

In North America, the Whig Junto was the inspiration for Benjamin Franklin's Junto in 1727 Philadelphia upon his return from London.

== First (Main) Whig Junto ==
OFFICE	NAME	TERM
Chancellor of the Exchequer	Sir Charles Montagu	1694–1699
First Lord of the Treasury	Sir Charles Montagu	1697–1699
Lord Keeper	The Lord Somers	1694–1697
Lord Chancellor	The Lord Somers	1697–1699
Comptroller of the Household	The Lord Wharton	1694–1699
Master-General of the Ordnance	The Earl of Romney	1694–1699
Lord High Admiral	The Earl of Orford	1694–1699
Northern Secretary	The Duke of Shrewsbury	1694–1695
Southern Secretary	The Duke of Shrewsbury	1695–1698
Archbishop of Canterbury	Thomas Tenison	1694–1699
First Lord of the Treasury	The Lord Godolphin of Rialton (T)	1694–1697
Lord President of the Council	The Duke of Leeds	1694–1699
Lord Privy Seal	The Earl of Pembroke	1694–1699
Lord Steward	The Duke of Devonshire	1694–1699
Lord Chamberlain	The Earl of Sunderland	1695–1699
Southern Secretary	Sir John Trenchard	1694–1695
Southern Secretary	James Vernon (Note: James Vernon was appointed Secretary of State in 1697, with responsibility for the Northern Department. The following year, after the Duke of Shrewsbury left the government, he took responsibility for the Southern Department as well.)	1698–1699
Northern Secretary	Sir William Trumbull	1695–1697
Northern Secretary	James Vernon	1697–1699

== Later Whig Junto and the Whig Governments ==
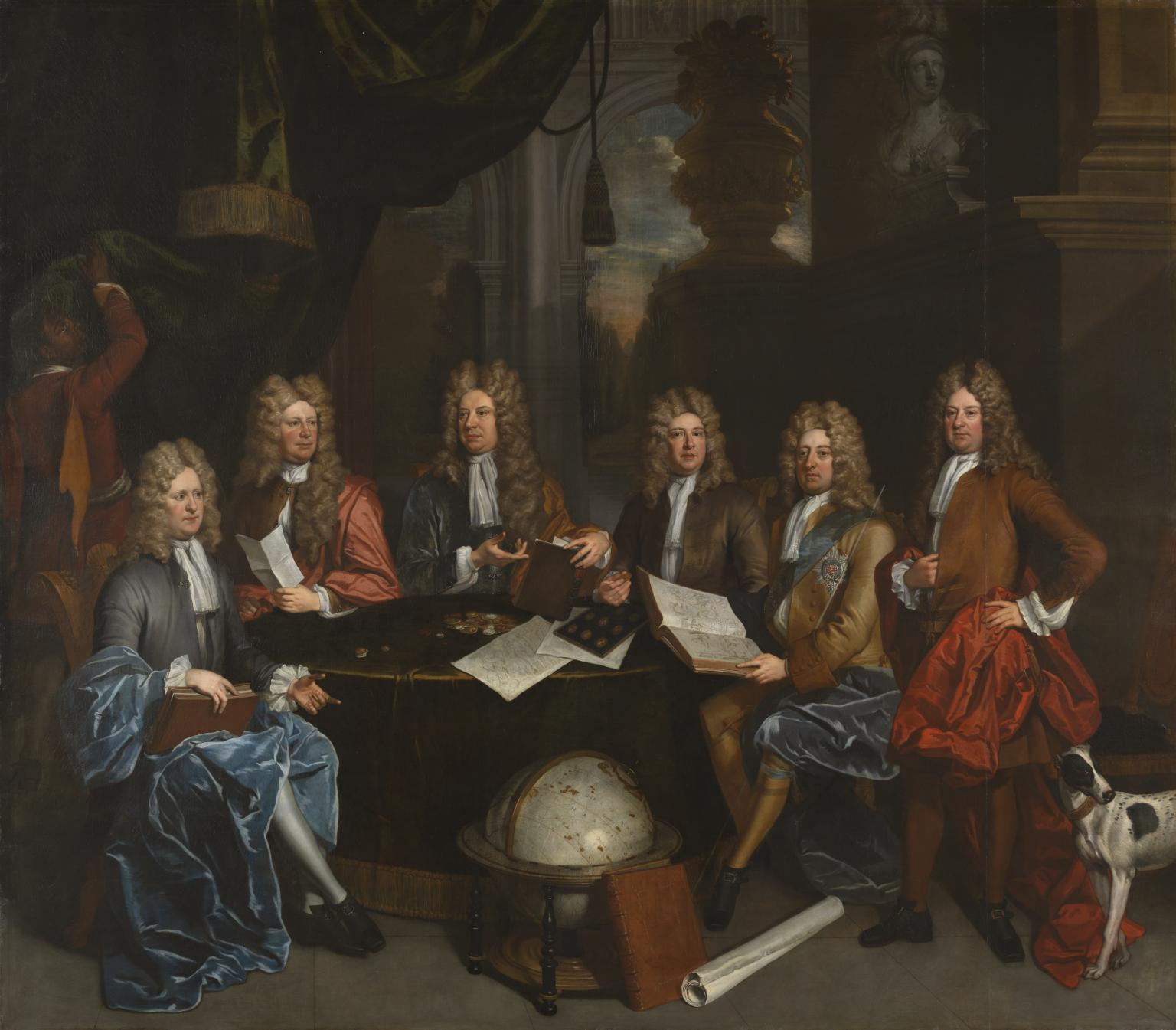
The Second Whig Junto by John James Baker, 1710

The Junto came back to power within a year of the accession as King of George I, the Elector of Hanover, in 1714 but most of the members died early in the new reign: Wharton and Halifax in 1715, Somers the next year, while Orford and Sunderland soon fell out with each other. Orford did not hold office after 1717.

Whigs however took full control of the government in 1715, and despite a brief internal split remained totally dominant, reaching new heights with the creation of the first recognised Prime Minister, Robert Walpole. Whig dominance came to an end under King George III however, who ensured the creation of more Tory peerages. The Tories sought to dispel the economic favouritism caused by this long renewed period of Whig ascendancy, and promised greater royal concessions to the King.

== Notes and references ==
Notes

== Sources ==
- Clark, George (1955). The Later Stuarts 1660–1714 (2nd ed.). Oxford University Press.
- Coward, Barry (2017). "chapter 13". The Stuart Age (5th ed.).
- Gregg, Edward (2001). Queen Anne. Yale University Press.
- Hopkinson, M. R. (1934). Anne of England: The Biography of a Great Queen. New York: Macmillan.
- Macaulay, Thomas Babington (1878). History of England from the Accession of James II. Philadelphia: J. B. Lippincott.
