= John Fox =

John Fox or Foxe may refer to:

== Arts and entertainment ==
=== Writers ===
- John Fox (biographer) (1693–1763), English biographer
- John Fox (writer) (1952–1990), American novelist and short-story writer
- John Fox, Jr. (1862–1919), American journalist and novelist

=== Others in arts and entertainment ===
- John Fox (comedian) (1953–2012), American comedian
- John Fox (composer) (1924–2015), English composer and conductor of light music
- John Fox, co-director of 2025 film Flight Risk
- Johnny Fox (performer) (1953–2017), American professional sword swallower and sleight-of-hand expert

== Military ==
- Tinker Fox (1610–1650), English Parliamentarian soldier
- John R. Fox (1915–1944), U.S. Army officer and Medal of Honor recipient in World War II

== Politics ==
- John Foxe (MP) (died 1586), Member of Parliament for Aldeburgh
- John Fox (Newfoundland politician) (1818–1871), merchant and politician in Newfoundland
- John Fox (New York politician) (1835–1914), U.S. Representative from New York
- Marcus Fox (1927–2002), British Conservative Party politician
- John M. Fox, mayor of Grand Rapids, Michigan, 1856
- Johnny Fox (1948–1995), Irish politician

== Sport ==
=== Cricket ===
- John Fox (cricketer, born 1851) (1851–1929), English cricketer
- John Fox (cricketer, born 1904) (1904–1961), English cricketer
- John Fox (cricketer, born 1929) (1929–2016), English cricketer
- John Fox (South African cricketer) (1929–2017), South African cricketer

=== Football ===
- John Fox (American football) (born 1955), American football coach
- John Fox (footballer) (born 1940), Australian rules footballer
- John Fox (rugby union) (1921–1999), Scottish rugby union player

=== Others in sport ===
- John Fox (baseball) (1859–1893), American Major League Baseball pitcher
- John Fox (hurler) (born 1892), Irish hurler
- John Fox (water polo) (born 1963), Australian water polo player
- Tiger Jack Fox (1907–1954), American light-heavyweight boxer

== Others ==
- John Fox (1611–1691), Clerk of the Acatry to King Charles II
- John Fox (minister), English minister
- John Fox (railway engineer) (1924–2001), Canadian civil engineer
- John Fox (sociologist) (1947–2025), American-Canadian sociologist
- John Fox (statistician) (born 1946), British statistician
- John Fox, DC Comics superhero named the Flash
- John A. Fox (1836–1920), American architect
- John Charles Fox (1855–1943), English solicitor and Master of the Supreme Court, Chancery Division
- John Foxe (neuroscientist) (born 1967), Irish neuroscientist
- John Foxe (1516–1587), English clergyman

== See also ==
- John Foxx (born 1948), English pop musician born Dennis Leigh
- Jon D. Fox (born 1947), Republican politician from Pennsylvania
- Jonathan Fox (disambiguation)
