= Sarter =

Sarter is a surname. Notable people with the surname include:

- Martin Sarter, German-American psychologist, married to Nadine
- Nadine Sarter (born 1959), German-American industrial engineer, married to Martin
- Stephan von Sarter (1833–1902), German-French financial expert

== See also ==
- Sartre (surname)
