= Satre =

Satre is a surname. Notable people with the surname include:

- Ana Raquel Satre (1925–2014), Uruguayan operatic soprano
- Tully Satre (born 1989), American gay rights activist and gay writer
- Karl Magnus Satre (1907–1967), American Olympic Nordic skiing contestant
- Paul Ottar Satre (1908–1984), American Olympic Nordic skiing contestant
- Pierre Satre (1909–1980), French engineer

Satre may also refer to:

- Satre (Etruscan god)

== See also ==
- Sartre (disambiguation)
- Sater (disambiguation)
