= Royal Hospital Chelsea =

Retirement home and nursing home for British soldiers

Coordinates: 51°29′11″N 0°9′28″W

The Royal Hospital Chelsea is an old soldiers' retirement home and nursing home for some 300 veterans of the British Army. Founded as an almshouse — the ancient sense of the word "hospital" — by King Charles II in 1682, it is a 66-acre (27 ha) site located on Royal Hospital Road in Chelsea, London. It is an independent charity and relies partly upon donations to cover day-to-day running costs to provide care and accommodation for veterans.

Residents are known as Chelsea Pensioners. The gardens of the Royal Hospital are Grade II listed on the Register of Historic Parks and Gardens.

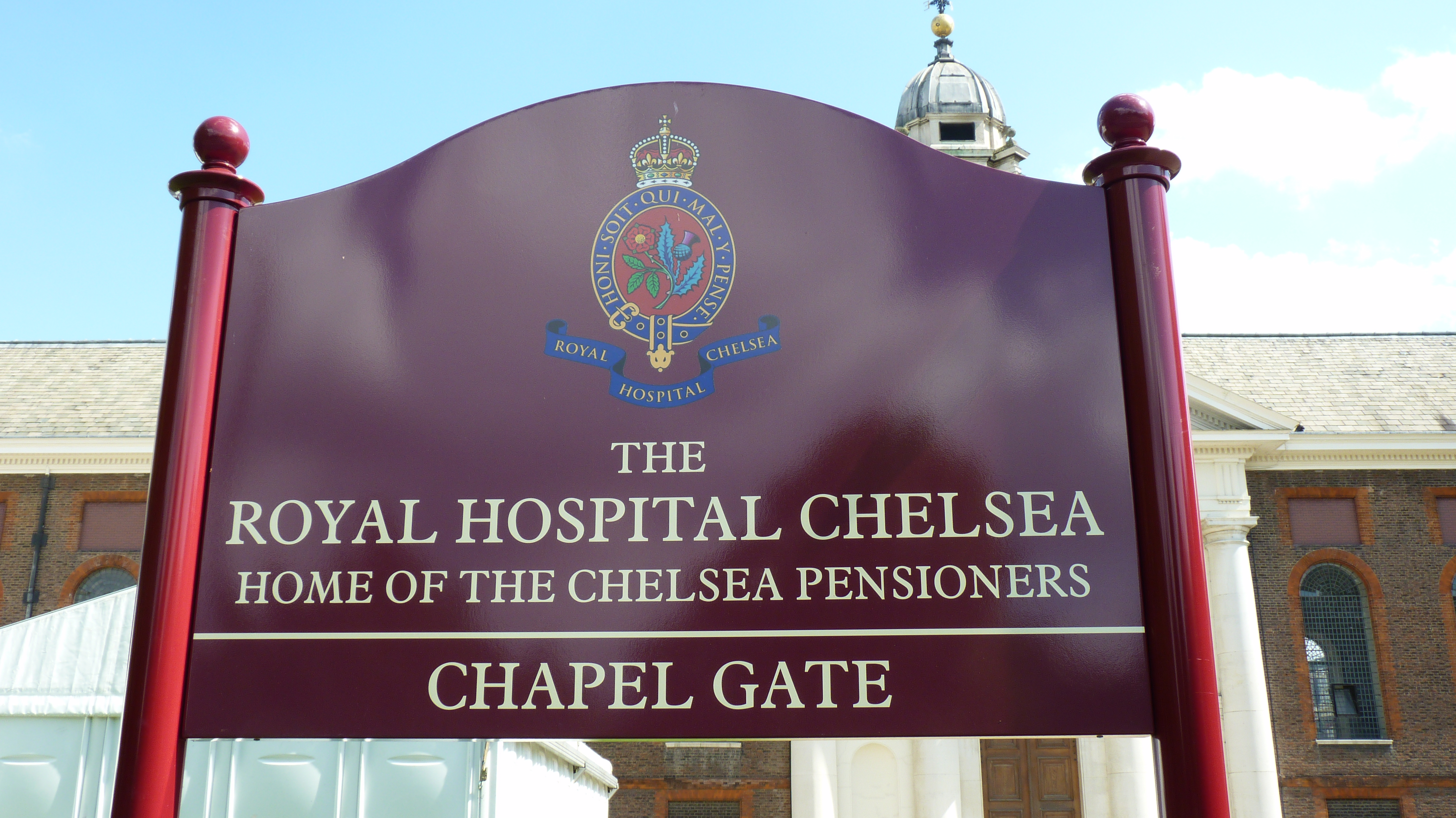

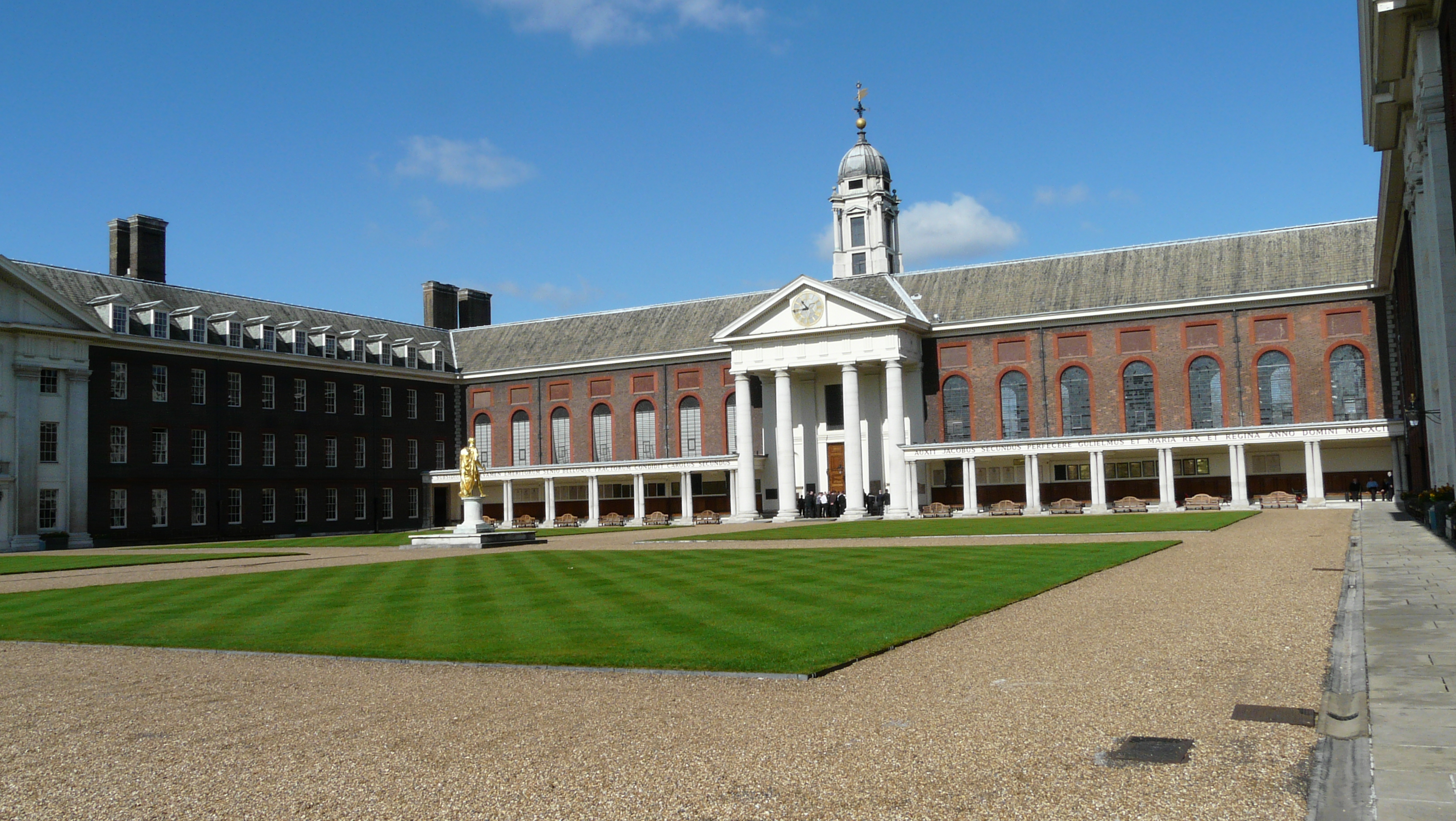
Figure Court of the Royal Hospital Chelsea

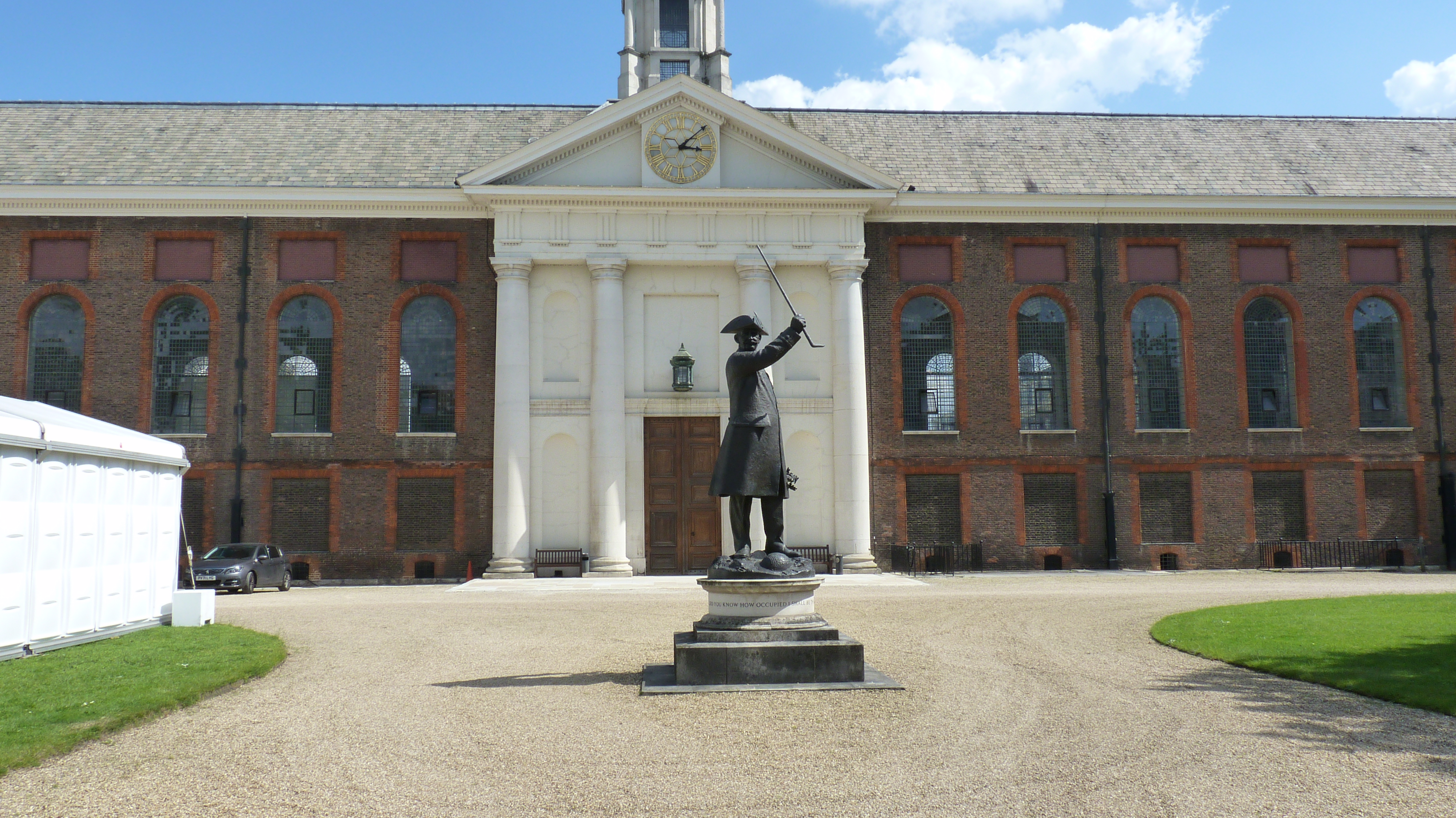

== History ==
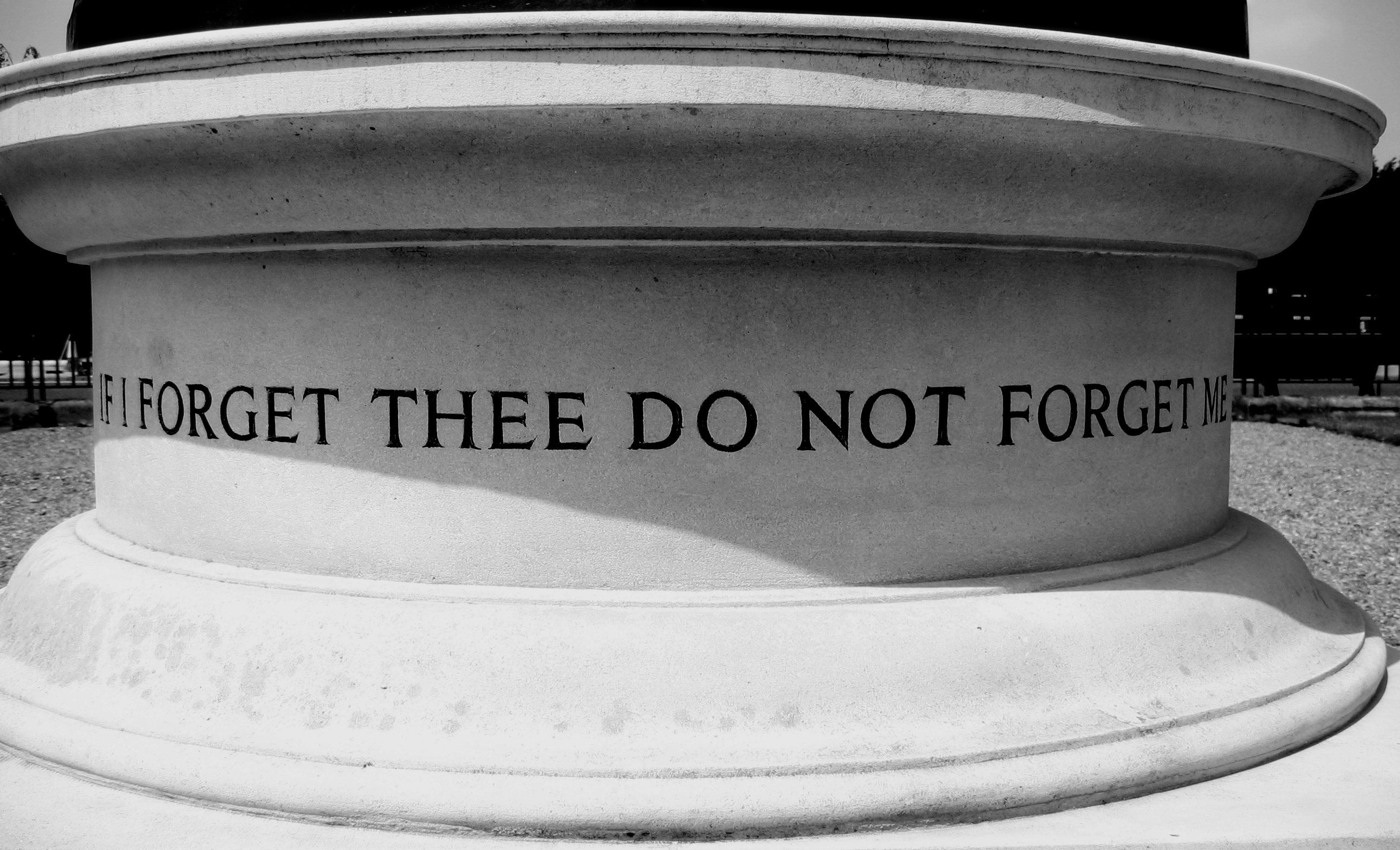
An inscription on the statue of a Pensioner outside the hospital

The Royal Hospital on Stanford's map of central London 1897

King Charles II founded the Royal Hospital as a retreat for veterans in 1682. The initiative is said to have come from Nell Gwyn according to Peter Cunningham's "The Story of Nell Gwyn" [1851]. The tradition was perpetuated when her portrait was used as a sign for a public house in Grosvenor Row (a thoroughfare which disappeared in the 19th century). The provision of a hostel rather than the payment of pensions was inspired by Les Invalides in Paris. The site for the Royal Hospital was an area of Chelsea, London which held an incomplete building "Chelsey College", a theological college James I founded in 1609.

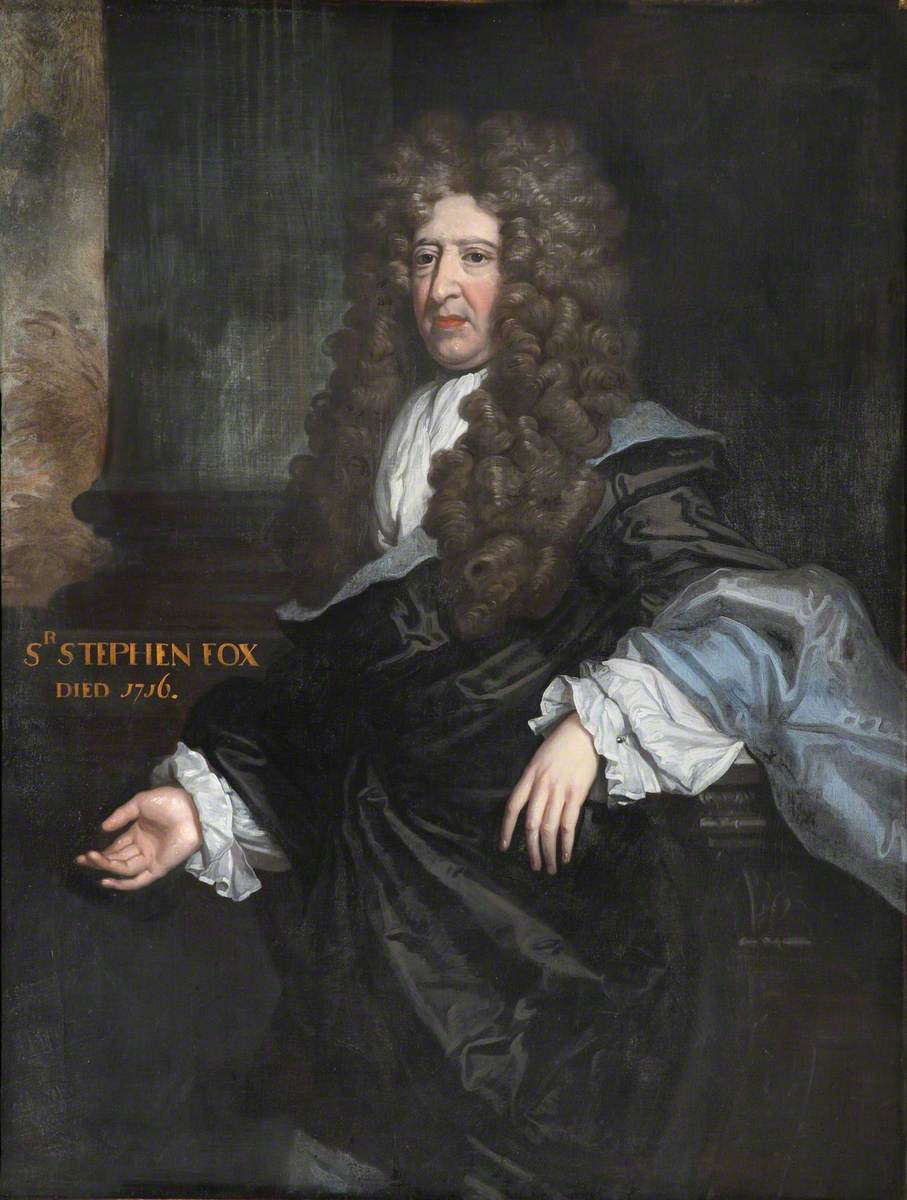
Sir Stephen Fox (1627–1716), the inspiration behind the founding of the hospital, and a generous benefactor. Portrait by John James Baker, collection of the Royal Hospital Chelsea

The precursor to the foundation was the establishment in 1677 of pensions for "Reformed Officers (i.e. officers of disbanded regiments) and maimed soldiers". The main inspirational force behind the foundation of the hospital was Sir Stephen Fox (1627–1716), Paymaster of the Forces and a trusted and able royal administrator of the King, and in 1681 Fox and the king initiated plans for a permanent hospital for disabled soldiers. Letters patent were issued on 22 December 1681 notifying the king's intention of building "an hospital for the relief of such land soldiers as are, or shall be, old, lame, or infirm in ye service of the crowne". For this purpose he appointed as "Receiver General and Treasurer of the moneys raised for the erection and maintenance of the hospital" Nicholas Johnson (d.1682), Fox's brother-in-law and successor as Paymaster of the Forces. The office of "Receiver or Paymaster and Treasurer" was held by all subsequent Paymaster of the Forces until the latter office was abolished in 1836. Fox himself, the "richest commoner in the three kingdoms", donated £13,000 towards the new hospital (equivalent to £2,436,000 in 2025).

The Royal Hospital opened its doors to the Chelsea Pensioners in 1692 for "the relief and succour" of veterans. Some of the first soldiers admitted included those injured at the Battle of Sedgemoor. Sir Christopher Wren expanded his original design to add two additional quadrangles to the east and west of the central court; these were known respectively as the "Light Horse Court" and the "College Court". Due to mismanagement by Lord Ranelagh, the Hospital Treasurer, the building was not completed until 1692.

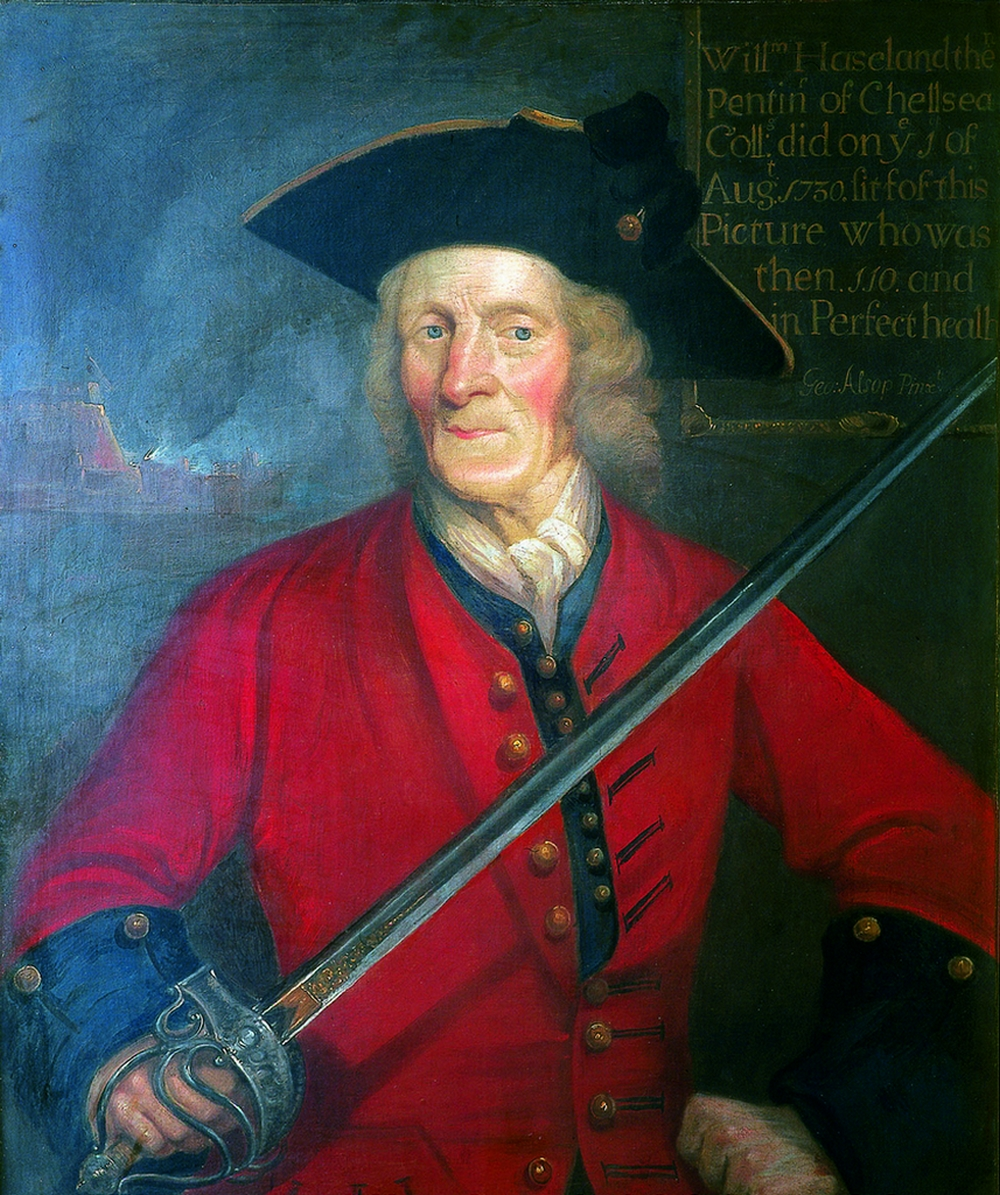
Sergeant William Hiseland, [1620–1732] an English Civil War cavalier and one of the first pensioners to be admitted to the Royal Hospital in London

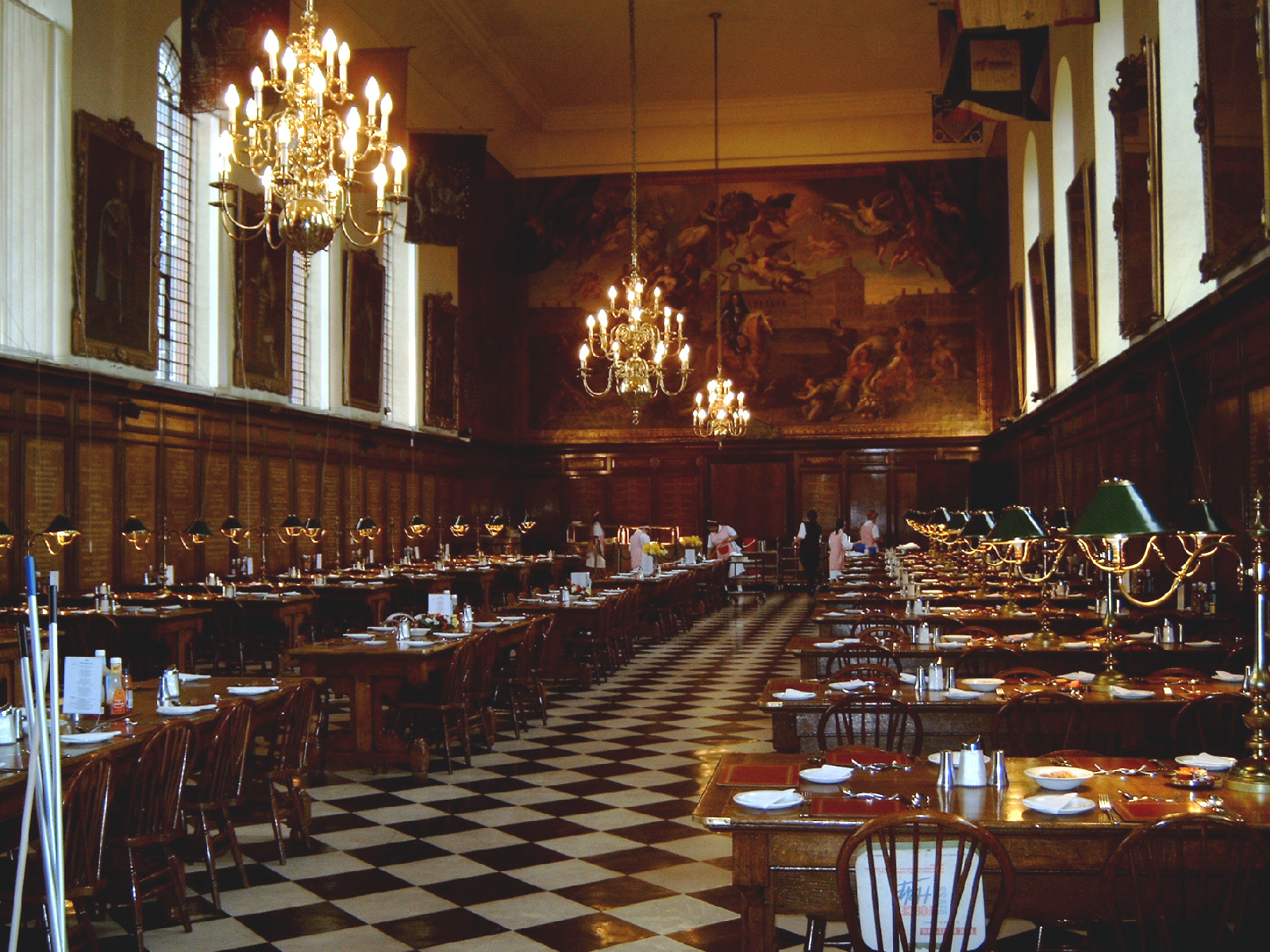
The Great Hall

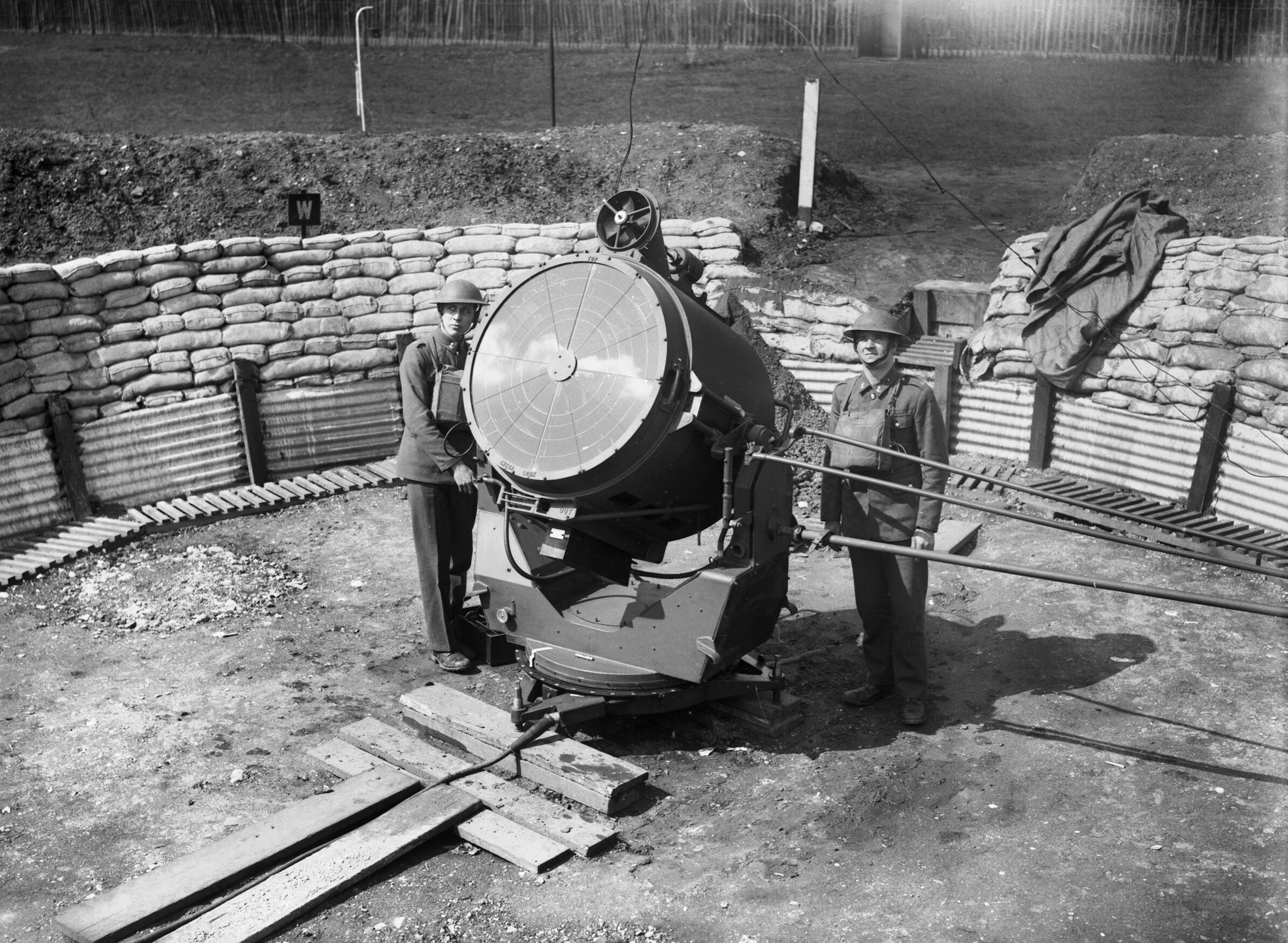
An anti-aircraft searchlight and crew 17 April 1940

Sir John Soane, who was clerk of works in the early part of the 19th century, designed and constructed a new infirmary building which was located to the west of the main building on the site of the current National Army Museum and was destroyed by bombing during the Second World War. It was replaced by a modern infirmary which was located to the east of the main building and opened by Queen Elizabeth The Queen Mother in 1961.

The 1960s infirmary was demolished to make way for the Margaret Thatcher Infirmary which was designed by Sir Quinlan Terry and was completed in 2008, providing a state-of-the-art care home.

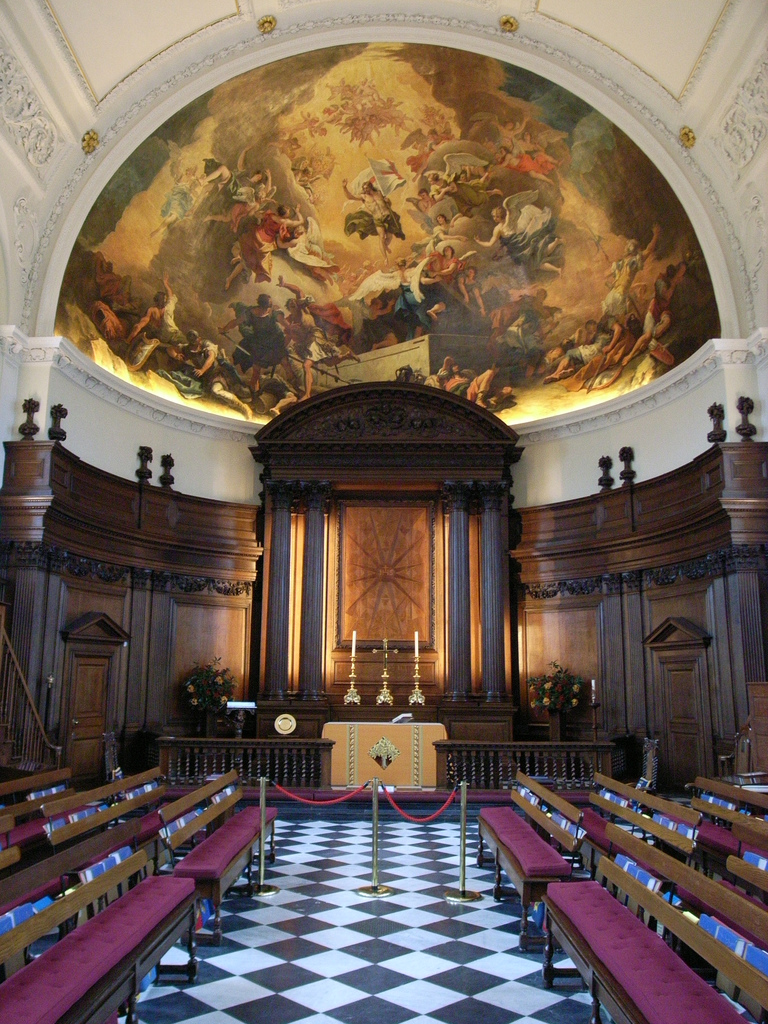
The chapel, Royal Hospital Chelsea (1681–91), by Christopher Wren

In 2002, the sovereign's mace was presented to the hospital – up until then, the hospital had had no colours or distinctive device – the mace is now carried at all the ceremonial events at the hospital. The mace was designed by Charles Webb and Aubrey Bowden and was made by Master Goldsmith Norman Bassant. The bowl of the mace is decorated with acorns and is surmounted by the St Edward's Crown.

In March 2009, the first women in the hospital's 317-year history were admitted as In-Pensioners. Winifred Phillips and Dorothy Hughes were the first. Winifred Phillips trained as a nurse and later joined the Auxiliary Territorial Service in 1948 before enlisting in the Women's Royal Army Corps in 1949 while serving in Egypt. After 22 years of service she retired with the rank of Warrant Officer Class 2.

Dorothy Hughes had joined the British Army in 1941 aged 18, later working as part of 450 Heavy Anti Aircraft Battery in the London Division. In 1945 the Battery was deployed near Dover to defend against V1 flying bomb attacks. She retired with the rank of Sergeant.

=== Uniform ===
Chelsea Pensioners are entitled to come and go from the Royal Hospital as they please, and are permitted to wear civilian clothing wherever they travel. However, within the hospital, and in the surrounding area, pensioners are encouraged to wear a blue uniform (known fondly as "blues"). If they travel farther from the Royal Hospital they should wear the distinctive scarlet coats instead of the blue uniform. The scarlet coats are also worn for ceremonial occasions, accompanied by tricorne hats. (At other times a peaked shako is worn.)

In uniform, the pensioners wear their medal ribbons and the insignia of rank they reached while serving in the military. They may also wear other insignia they earned during their service and many pensioners now wear parachute jump wings and even SAS jump wings. Contrary to popular belief, it is not nowadays illegal to impersonate a Chelsea pensioner; the myth probably dates from a ruling, repealed by the Statute Law (Repeals) Act 2008, regarding the fraud of taking an unearned pension.

There is a legend that Nell Gwyn, Charles II's mistress, suggested red coats for the Chelsea Pensioners because she remembered the pensioners of Coningsby Hospital in Hereford (her reputed birth town) wore coats of the same colour.

=== Founder's Day ===
The Royal Hospital Founder's Day takes place close to 29 May each year – the birthday of Charles II of England, and the date of his restoration as King in 1660. It is also known as Oak Apple Day, as it commemorates the escape of the future King following his defeat at the Battle of Worcester in 1651, when he hid in the Royal Oak to avoid capture by Parliamentary forces. On Founder's Day, in-pensioners of the Royal Hospital are reviewed by a member of the British royal family.

=== Statue of King Charles II ===
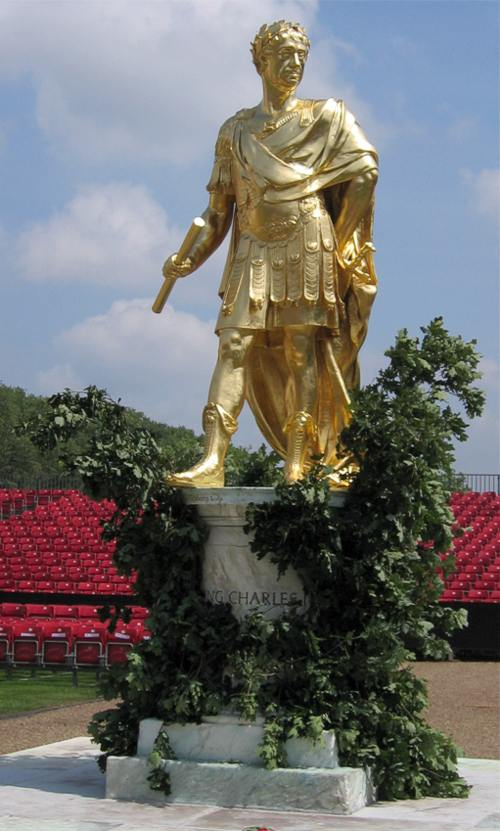
The statue of King Charles II in the Figure Court of the Royal Hospital Chelsea.

The 7' 6" (229 cm) statue of King Charles II which stands in the central court (the Figure Court) of the hospital was cast in copper alloy by Grinling Gibbons; it was originally gilded but was bronzed in 1787. In 2002, the statue was regilded to celebrate Queen Elizabeth II's Golden Jubilee.

=== Chapel ===
The hospital's chapel was designed by Sir Christopher Wren and is a fine and rare example of Wren's pure ecclesiastical work: it rises 42 feet (13 m) high and was completed in 1687. The chapel contains a fine painting of the Resurrection in the half dome of the apse, painted by Sebastiano Ricci and his nephew Marco (who assisted with the painting at the Royal Hospital) and dates from the end of Queen Anne's reign. The chapel was consecrated in August 1691, and services were formerly held twice daily. Nowadays services are confined to Sunday mornings and special military occasions.

=== Great Hall ===
The Great Hall was also designed by Sir Christopher Wren and was originally intended as a dining hall, furnished with 16 long tables, one for each original Long Ward. It contains a large mural painting from around 1690, which depicts Charles II of England on horseback being crowned by the winged figure of Victory, with the Royal Hospital Buildings behind.

Just before 1800 the pensioners started dining in the wards and the hall was then used for recreational purposes. It was here that the Duke of Wellington lay in state in 1852 and the table on which his coffin rested is just inside the entrance. The hall reverted to its original use as a dining hall in 1955.

=== State Apartments ===
The heavily moulded ceiling displaying James II's cypher is by John Grove, the wainscoting is by William Cleere and the fine lime-wood carving over the fireplace is by William Emmett. The room was completed between 1685 and 1688. It was fully roofed in 1685 days before Charles II died. Within the State Apartments is also an Ante-Chamber. Both the Council Chamber and Ante-Chamber can be hired for private functions and weddings.

=== Margaret Thatcher Infirmary ===
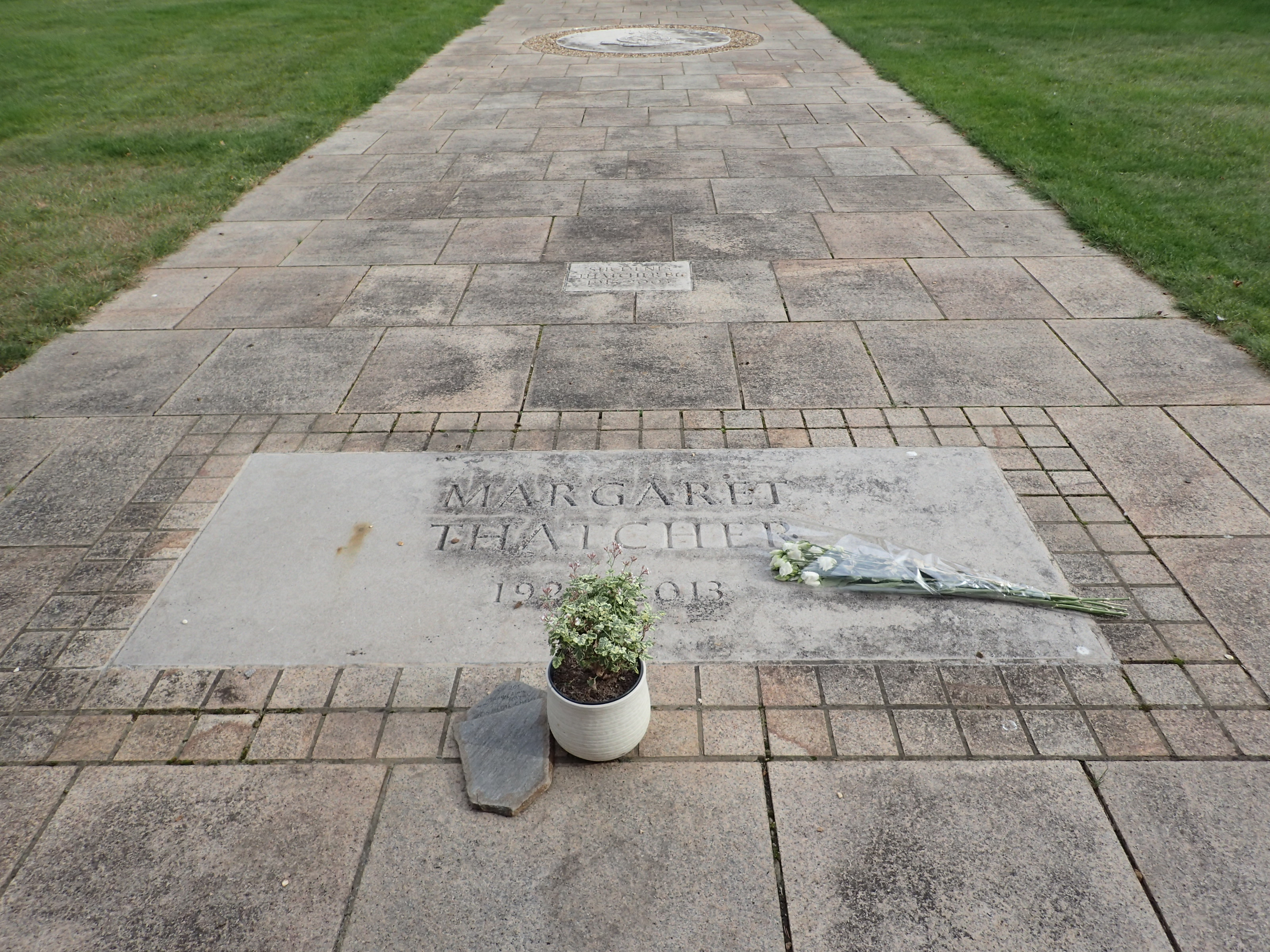
The graves of Margaret and Denis Thatcher, whose ashes were interred at the infirmary in 2013 and 2003 respectively

The Margaret Thatcher Infirmary houses around 100 Chelsea Pensioners. Opened in 2009 by Charles, Prince of Wales it is a state-of-the-art care home that offers nursing and a GP surgery. The Matron is in charge of the infirmary and has a team including nurses, therapists and care staff. The MTI has a gym and a hydrotherapy pool for use by In-Pensioners. It has a range of activities pensioners can join, from pottery classes to poetry recitals. The infirmary received the Quality Hallmark Award at Beacon Status (the highest level possible) from the National Gold Standards Framework Centre in End of Life Care in 2015.

=== Ceremonies ===
The annual Ceremony of the Christmas Cheeses is based on a 300-year-old tradition which began in 1692, when the Royal Hospital Chelsea asked a local cheesemonger to provide in-pensioners with cheese to get them through the festive period. The Dairy Council is now in its 56th year of organising a special ceremony at the hospital, where donations from cheesemongers from across the country are presented to the residents. A Chelsea pensioner cuts the ceremonial cheese with a sword and the cheese is distributed among the pensioners around the Christmas period.

Another annual tradition at the Royal Hospital is the Christmas Cake Ceremony, which commenced in 1949. It is a symbol of the enduring friendship between the UK and Australia and takes the form of a Christmas cake being presented to the hospital from the Australian Returned and Services League, with each Australian state taking it in turns year by year. Again, a pensioner at the Royal Hospital cuts the cake with a sword.

== Public opening and events ==
The on-site museum details the history and life of the Royal Hospital and its In-Pensioners, together with displays of artefacts, documents, medals, cap badges and uniforms. Recent additions include the Sovereign's mace and Parade Chair. A large diorama depicts the Royal Hospital and Ranelagh Gardens as they appeared in 1742. Daily walking tours of the site and museum, led by Chelsea pensioners themselves, can be booked in advance.

The South Grounds of the Royal Hospital are also used for large-scale public events including the world-famous Chelsea Flower Show, held by the Royal Horticultural Society. The show has been held in the grounds since 1913, and attracts around 165,000 visitors.

In September 2022, the hospital served as the meeting point for foreign heads of state, leaders, and ambassadors to gather ahead of Queen Elizabeth's funeral. From there, the dignitaries traveled to Westminster Abbey by coach.

=== Singora Cannon ===
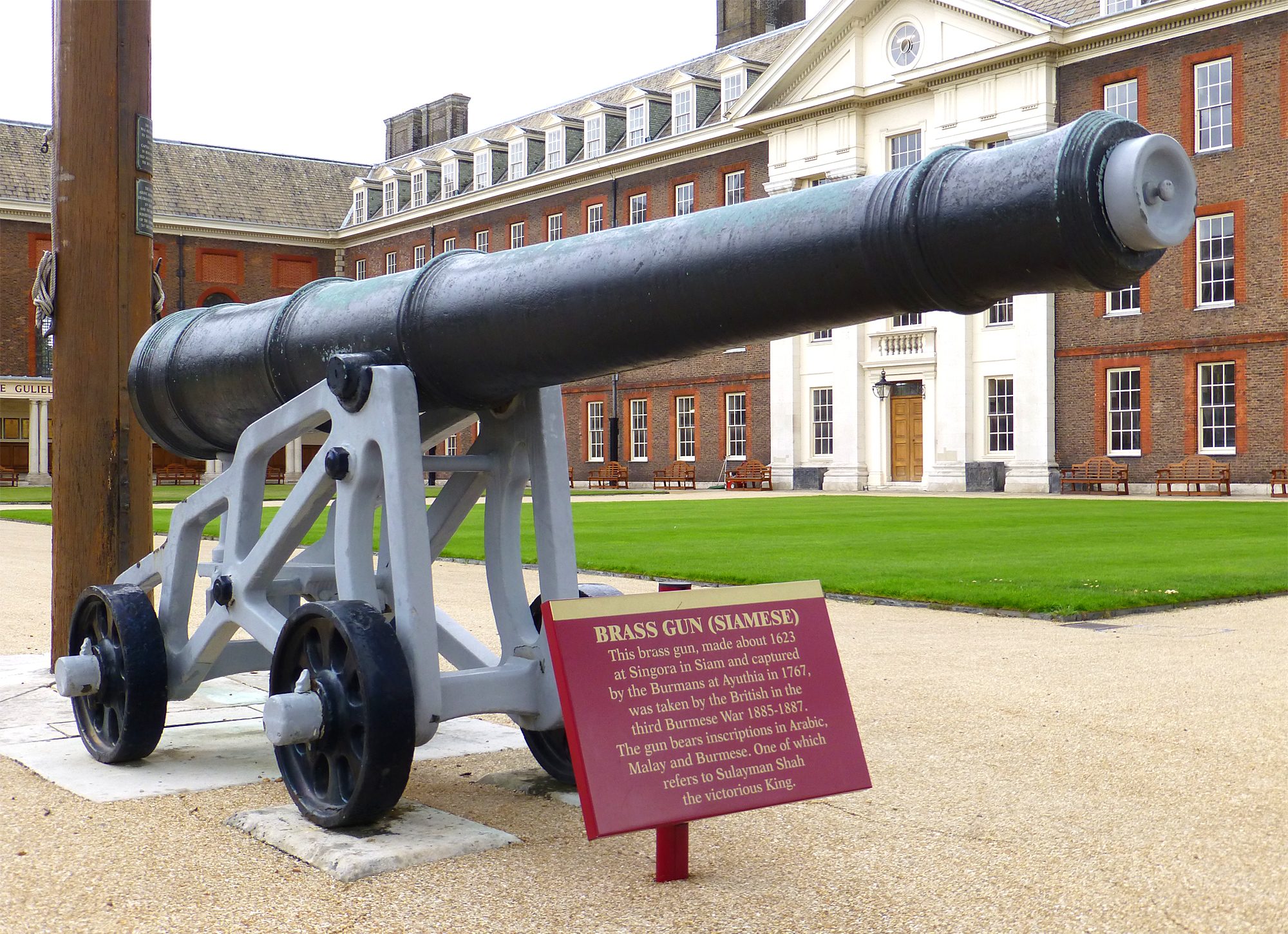
The Singora cannon next to the flagpole in the grounds of the Figure Court

Prominently displayed in the grounds next to the flagpole is an inscribed cannon from Singora bearing the seal of Sultan Sulaiman Shah. The cannon was made in Singora around 1623, captured from the Sultanate of Singora by the Siamese in 1680, taken from the Siamese by the Burmese in the Burmese–Siamese war of 1765–1767 and transported to Burma. In the third Anglo-Burmese War (1885–1887) the cannon was taken by the British and shipped back to England.

== Organisation ==
The hospital maintains a 'military-based culture which puts a premium on comradeship'. The in-pensioners are formed into four companies, each headed by a Captain of Invalids (an ex-Army officer responsible for the 'day to day welfare, management and administration' of the pensioners under his charge).

There is also a Secretary who traditionally was responsible for paying the Army pensions, but today they look after the annual budget, staff, buildings and grounds. Further senior staff include the Physician & Surgeon, the Matron, the Quartermaster, the Chaplain and the Adjutant.

A Board of Commissioners has governed the Royal Hospital since 1702. The ex-officio chairman of the board is HM Paymaster General (whose predecessor Sir Stephen Fox was instrumental in founding the hospital in the seventeenth century). The purpose of the Board is 'to guide the development of The Royal Hospital, ensuring the care and well-being of the residents who live there and safeguarding the historic buildings and grounds, which it owns in trust'.

Royal Hospital is also a ward of the Kensington and Chelsea Council. The population at the 2011 Census was 7,252.

=== List of governors ===
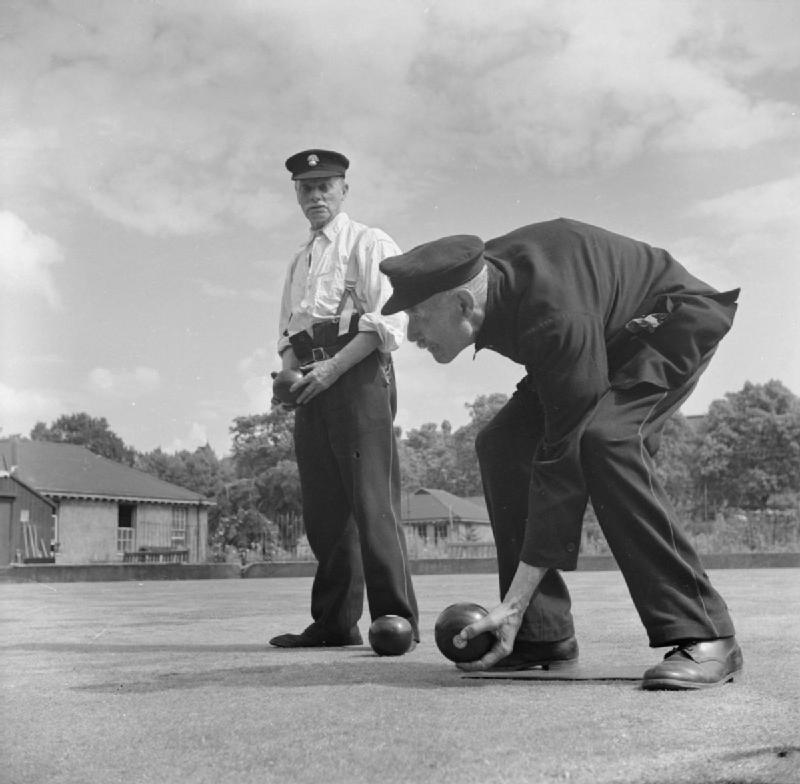
Chelsea Pensioners enjoy a game of bowls in the grounds of the Royal Hospital Chelsea, 1945

The following is a list of those who have served as Governor:

- Brigadier General Thomas Stanwix 1714–1720
- Lieutenant General Charles Churchill 1720–1722
- Lieutenant General William Evans 1722–1740
- Field Marshal Sir Robert Rich, 4th Baronet 1740–1768
- Field Marshal Sir George Howard 1768–1795
- Field Marshal George Townshend 1795–1796
- General Sir William Fawcett 1796–1804
- General Sir David Dundas 1804–1820
- Field Marshal Sir Samuel Hulse 1820–1837
- General Sir Edward Paget 1837–1849
- General Sir George Anson 1849
- General Sir Colin Halkett 1849–1856
- Field Marshal Sir Edward Blakeney 1856–1868
- Field Marshal Sir Alexander Woodford 1868–1870
- General Sir John Pennefather 1870–1872
- Lt-General Sir Sydney Cotton 1872–1874
- Field Marshal Sir Patrick Grant 1874–1895
- Field Marshal Sir Donald Stewart, 1st Baronet 1895–1900
- Field Marshal Sir Henry Norman 1901–1904
- Field Marshal Sir George White 1905–1912
- General Sir Neville Lyttelton 1912–1931
- General Sir Walter Braithwaite 1931–1938
- General Sir Harry Knox 1938–1943
- General Sir Clive Liddell 1943–1949
- General Sir Bernard Paget 1949–1956
- General Sir Cameron Nicholson 1956–1961
- General Sir Frank Simpson 1961–1969
- General Sir Charles Jones 1969–1975
- General Sir Antony Read 1975–1981
- General Sir Robert Ford 1981–1987
- General Sir Roland Guy 1987–1993
- General Sir Brian Kenny 1993–1999
- General Sir Jeremy Mackenzie 1999–2006
- General The Lord Walker of Aldringham 2006–2011
- General Sir Redmond Watt 2011–2018
- General Sir Adrian Bradshaw 2018–present

== Notable staff ==
Law; Eleanor Josephine, Matron from 1907 until at least 1925. Law trained at The London Hospital under Eva Luckes between 1889 and 1891.

== See also ==
- Chelsea Flower Show
- Healthcare in London
- List of hospitals in England

International

- Royal Hospital Kilmainham (equivalent in Dublin)
- Les Invalides, the complex which houses the French equivalent of the Royal Hospital
- Institution des Invalides de la Legion Etrangere (French Foreign Legion equivalent)
- Old soldiers' home (USA)

== Sources ==
- The Royal Hospital Chelsea ("the Guidebook"). Jarrold Publishing. 2002.
