= Edward Pleydell =

Edward Pleydell (c. 1657 – 1731) was the member of Parliament for Cricklade from 1698 to 1700.

Parliament of England
| Preceded by Charles Fox; Edmund Richmond Webb | Member of Parliament for Cricklade; 1698–1701; With: Charles Fox 1698–1699; Sir Stephen Fox | Succeeded by Thomas Richmond Webb; Samuel Barker |
