= Thomas Moore (British Army officer, died 1735) =

Colonel Thomas Moore (c. 1669–1735) was an officer of the British Army who served as Paymaster of the Forces Abroad.

== Biography ==
Moore was the younger brother of Arthur Moore, an Irishman of obscure origin who became successful in the City of London. On 10 August 1693 he was commissioned as ensign of Sir Charles Hara's company of the 1st Regiment of Foot Guards. He was further promoted to lieutenant (with the rank of captain) on 1 August 1695, and to captain in the Coldstream Regiment of Foot Guards (with the rank of lieutenant-colonel) on 25 January 1702. On 29 March 1708 he succeeded Thomas Allen as colonel of a regiment of Foot. His regiment was disbanded in 1713, and on 4 September that year he was granted the post of Paymaster of the Forces Abroad. The grant was revoked on 3 October 1714, following the death of Queen Anne. In 1729 Moore purchased the manor of Polesden from his elder brother Arthur. He died unmarried in 1735, aged 66, and was buried in a vault of St Nicolas' Church, Great Bookham, on 25 March. His heir was his nephew William.
