= William Shirley (cricketer) =

English cricketer (1900–1970)

Personal information
- Full name: William Robert de la Cour Shirley
- Born: 13 October 1900; Marylebone, London, England
- Died: 23 April 1970 (aged 69); Bognor Regis, Sussex, England
- Batting: Right-handed
- Bowling: Right-arm fast-medium

Domestic team information
- Years: Team
- 1922–1925: Hampshire
- 1924: Cambridge University

Career statistics
Competition	First-class
Matches	62
Runs scored	1,458
Batting average	17.78
100s/50s	0/3
Top score	90
Balls bowled	3,433
Wickets	81
Bowling average	23.60
5 wickets in innings	0
10 wickets in match	0
Best bowling	4/10
Catches/stumpings	31/–
- Source: Cricinfo, 21 June 2008

William Robert de la Cour Shirley (13 October 1900 – 23 April 1970) was an English cricketer and a colonial police officer in British Nigeria. He played over sixty first-class matches, mostly for Cambridge University and Hampshire.

== Education and cricket ==
The son of the soldier William S. Shirley, he was born at Marylebone in October 1900. He was educated at Eton College, where he played for the college cricket and Eton wall teams. From there he matriculated to Pembroke College, Cambridge. Having from the age of 17 been beset with a number of serious injuries, his debut in first-class cricket came at the age of 21 when he was studying at Cambridge, for the Free Foresters against Cambridge University at Fenner's in 1922. In that same season, he debuted for Hampshire against Warwickshire at Edgbaston in the County Championship; his debut was to become one of the most extraordinary matches in County Championship history. Having made 223 in their first-innings, Warwickshire proceeded to bowl Hampshire out for only 15, with Shirley making a single run before he was dismissed by Freddie Calthorpe; he was one of only three batsman to score any runs in the Hampshire innings. Forced to follow-on, Hampshire made 521, with Shirley contributing 30 runs before he was dismissed by John Fox. Set 309 for victory, Warwickshire were dismissed for 158 to give Hampshire a victory by 155 runs. Shirley appeared eleven times for Hampshire in 1922, recording his highest score during this season with 90 against Glamorgan at Southampton.

In 1923, Shirley made nineteen first-class appearances for Hampshire, all of which came in the County Championship. He scored 375 runs in the season and took 31 wickets with his right-arm fast-medium bowling, with best figures of 4 for 51. Having been studying for a number of years at Cambridge, he began playing for Cambridge University Cricket Club in 1924, making twelve first-class appearances; this included playing in The University Match at Lord's against Oxford University, for which he gained a blue. In addition to his matches for Cambridge, he also made fourteen appearances in the 1924 County Championship for Hampshire. His last season of first-class cricket came after he had graduated from Cambridge in 1924, with Shirley making four appearances for Hampshire in the 1925 County Championship. In his 62 first-class matches, he scored 1,458 runs at an average of 17.78. With the ball, he took 81 wickets at a bowling average of 23.60, with best figures of 4 for 10; for Cambridge he took 29 wickets and for Hampshire he took 52.

== Colonial service and later life ==
Shirley served in the Colonial Service, beginning as a cadet in 1927, and was posted to the colonial police in British Nigeria. He was later a senior assistant-superintendent in the colonial police force from 1941 to 1947, after which he was promoted to superintendent in 1947. While serving in British Nigeria, he played minor cricket matches for the European Nigerians.

Shirley later retired to England, where he died at Bognor Regis in April 1970.
