= European Journal of Neuroscience =

- Discipline: Neuroscience
- Language: English
- Edited by: John J. Foxe, Yoland Smith

Publication details
- History: 1989–present
- Publisher: Wiley-Blackwell on behalf of the Federation of European Neuroscience Societies
- Frequency: Biweekly
- Open access: Hybrid
- Impact factor: 3.4 (2022)

Standard abbreviations
- ISO 4: Eur. J. Neurosci.

Indexing
- CODEN: EJONEI
- ISSN: 0953-816X (print); 1460-9568 (web)
- OCLC no.: 39503252

Links
- Journal homepage; Online access; Online archive

The European Journal of Neuroscience is a biweekly peer-reviewed scientific journal covering all aspects of neuroscience. It was established in 1989 with Ray Guillery (then at the University of Oxford) as the founding editor-in-chief. The current editors-in-chief are John J. Foxe (University of Rochester) and Yoland Smith (Emory University). The journal is published by Wiley-Blackwell on behalf of the Federation of European Neuroscience Societies. Authors can elect to have accepted articles published as open access. The journal adopted transparent peer-review in January 2017.

== Features ==
The journal also publishes special and virtual issues related to topical issues in neuroscience.

== Editors-in-chief ==
The following persons have been or are editor-in-chief:

- Ray Guillery (1989–1993)
- Michel Cuénod (1993–1997)
- Barry Everitt (1997–2002)
- Barry Everitt and Chris Henderson (2002–2008)
- Jean-Marc Fritschy and Martin Sarter (2008–2014)
- J. Paul Bolam and John J. Foxe (2014–2020)
- John J. Foxe (2020–2023)
- John J. Foxe and Yoland Smith (2024-present)

== Abstracting and indexing ==
The journal is abstracted and indexed in:

- Biological Abstracts
- BIOSIS Previews
- CAB Abstracts
- Current Contents/Life Sciences
- EBSCO databases
- Embase
- Index Medicus/MEDLINE/PubMed
- PASCAL
- PsycINFO
- Répertoire International de Littérature Musicale
- Science Citation Index Expanded
- Scopus

According to the Journal Citation Reports, the journal has a 2022 impact factor of 3.4.
