= Nicholas Johnson (paymaster) =

Nicholas Johnson (died 20 April 1682) was Paymaster-General of His Majesty's Forces to King Charles II from 3 January 1680 to his death on 20 April 1682. It was a highly lucrative post, the first holder of which was his brother-in-law Sir Stephen Fox (1627–1716), the "richest commoner in the three kingdoms".

== Career ==
On 3 January 1680 he was appointed Paymaster-General of His Majesty's Forces, in succession to the second brief term of Sir Stephen Fox (1627–1716), who served firstly 1661–76 and secondly 1679–80. He was appointed by King Charles II as Receiver General and Treasurer of the moneys raised for the erection and maintenance of the Royal Hospital Chelsea, established by letters patent dated 22 December 1681, a project which was largely inspired by Sir Stephen Fox, who gave £13,000 towards the new foundation. The office of Receiver or Paymaster and Treasurer was held by all subsequent Paymasters General of the Forces until it was abolished in 1836.

== Marriage ==
He married Jane Fox (1639–1710), a sister of Sir Stephen Fox (1627–1716), first holder of the office of Paymaster-General of His Majesty's Forces.

== Death and burial ==
He died on 20 April 1682 and was buried in the cloisters of Westminster Abbey on 21 April 1682, where were also buried his wife and several of her Fox family nephews and nieces.
