= Federation of European Neuroscience Societies =

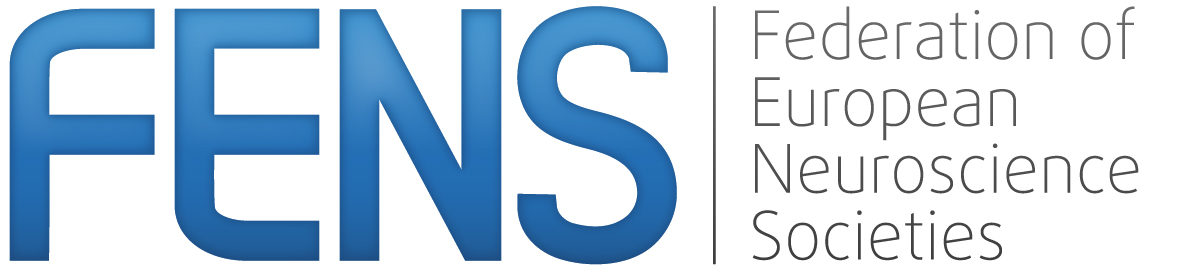
- Formation: 1998
- Members: 22,000
- Website: www.fens.org

The Federation of European Neuroscience Societies (FENS) is a European federation of scientific societies for basic scientists and physicians whose research is focused on the brain and nervous system (i.e., neuroscience).

== History ==
The federation was founded in 1998 to coordinate and present at the European level the research of members of national and European neuroscience societies. It succeeded the European Neuroscience Association. FENS federates 44 member societies and 5 associate member societies, representing around 23,000 scientists.

== Activities ==
FENS organises an international scientific meeting in even years, the FENS Forum of European Neuroscience. Every meeting takes place in a different European country hosted by its national neuroscience society. In the odd years that no Forum meeting takes place, a FENS Regional Meeting is held. In addition, twice yearly more specialised meetings are organized in collaboration with the Lundbeck Foundation, called The Brain Conferences.

== Publications ==
Together with Wiley-Blackwell, the federation publishes the European Journal of Neuroscience, a monthly peer-reviewed scientific journal, and the FENS Forum Abstracts, the proceedings of the FENS Forums of European Neuroscience.
