= Sartre (disambiguation) =

Jean-Paul Sartre (1905–1980) was a French existentialist philosopher.

Sartre may also refer to:

- Sartre (surname)
- SARTRE, the Safe Road Trains for the Environment EU technology project
- 11384 Sartre, a main-belt asteroid named after the philosopher
