= Jonathan Fox =

Jonathan Fox may refer to:

- Jonathan Fox (professor of politics), Israeli professor of economic politics
- Jonathan Fox (swimmer) (born 1991), British swimmer
- Jonathan Fox, police officer played by Larry Lamb in The Bill

== See also ==
- Jon D. Fox (1947–2018), politician
- John Fox (disambiguation)
