= Stephen Fox =

English politician (1627-1716)

Sir Stephen Fox
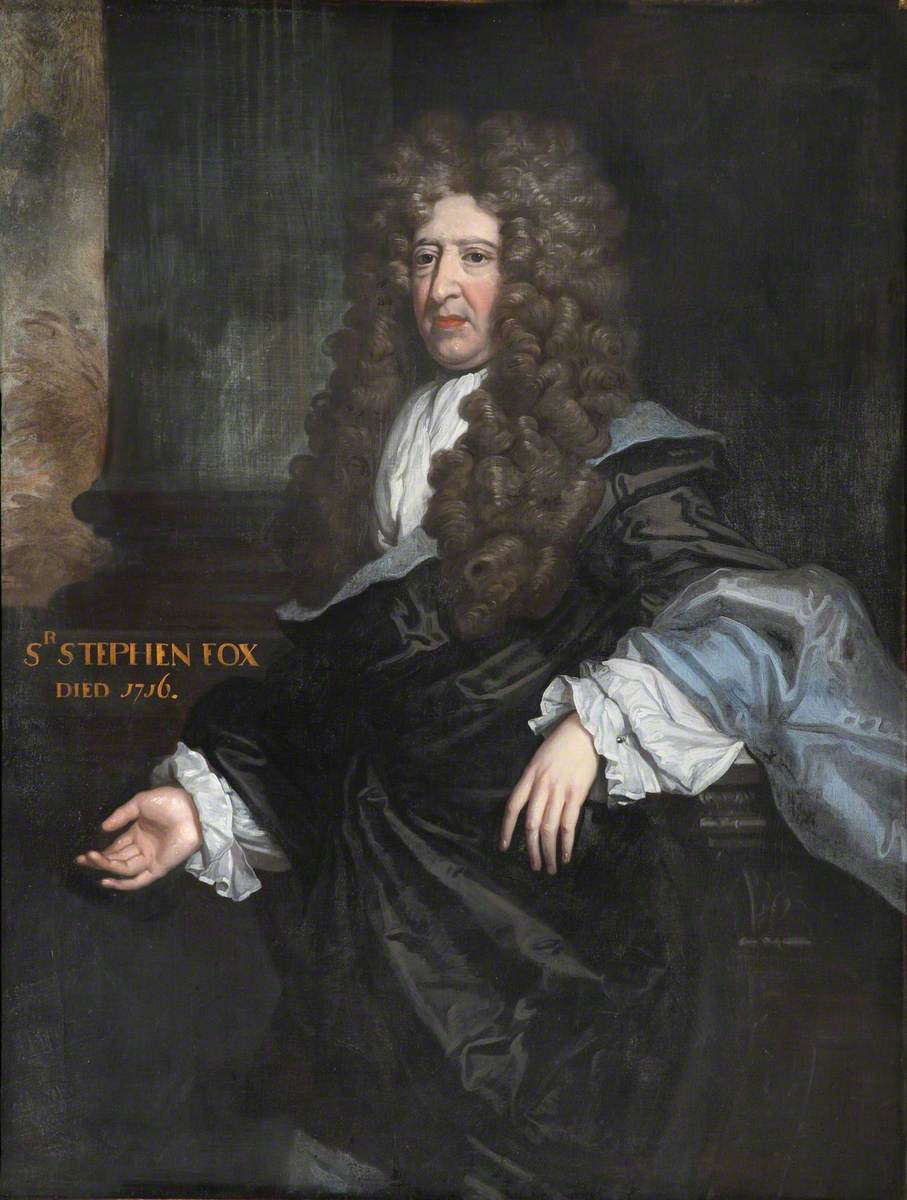
- Portrait by John James Baker, 1701

Personal details
- Born: 27 March 1627 Farley, Wiltshire
- Died: 28 October 1716 (aged 89)
- Spouse(s): Elizabeth Whittle; Christiana Hope
- Children: 14 children including Stephen Fox-Strangways, 1st Earl of Ilchester; Henry Fox, 1st Baron Holland
- Relatives: Fox family

Sir Stephen Fox (27 March 1627 – 28 October 1716) was an English politician who rose from humble origins to become the "richest commoner in the three kingdoms". He made the foundation of his wealth from his tenure of the newly created office of Paymaster-General of His Majesty's Forces, which he held twice, in 1661–1676 and 1679–1680. He was the principal force of inspiration behind the founding of the Royal Hospital Chelsea, to which he contributed £13,000 (equivalent to £2,436,000 in 2025).

== Early life ==
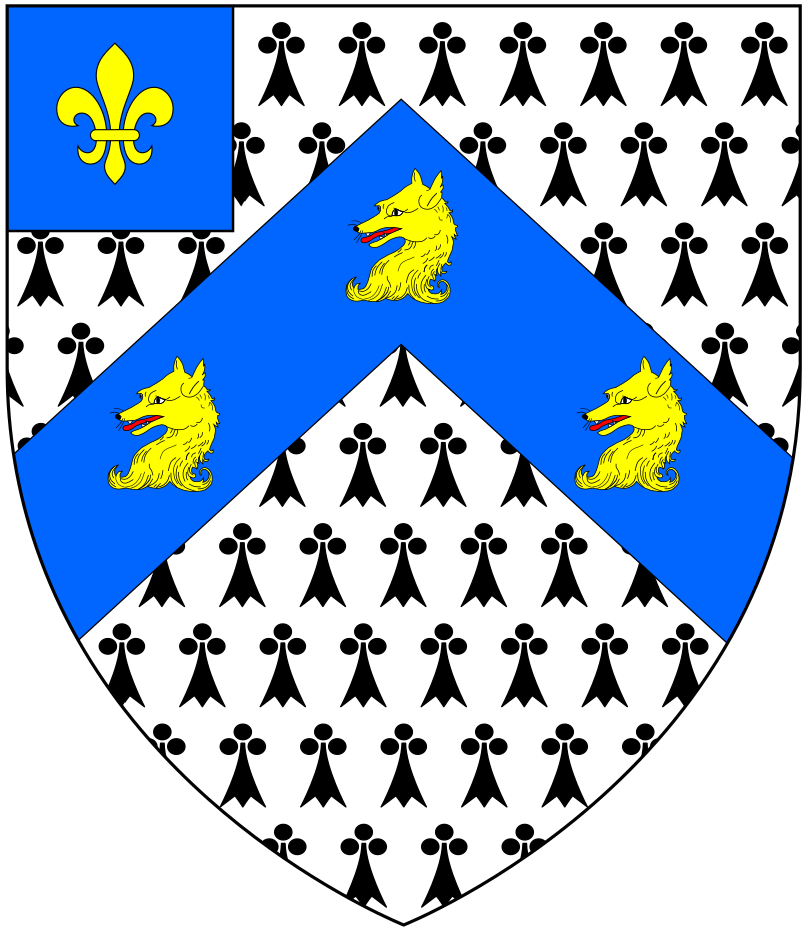
Canting arms of Fox: Ermine, on a chevron azure three fox's heads and necks erased or on a canton of the second a fleur-de-lys of the third. The canton is an augmentation of honour to his paternal arms, granted out of the Royal Arms as a mark of esteem to him and his heirs forever, by king Charles II following the Restoration of the Monarchy

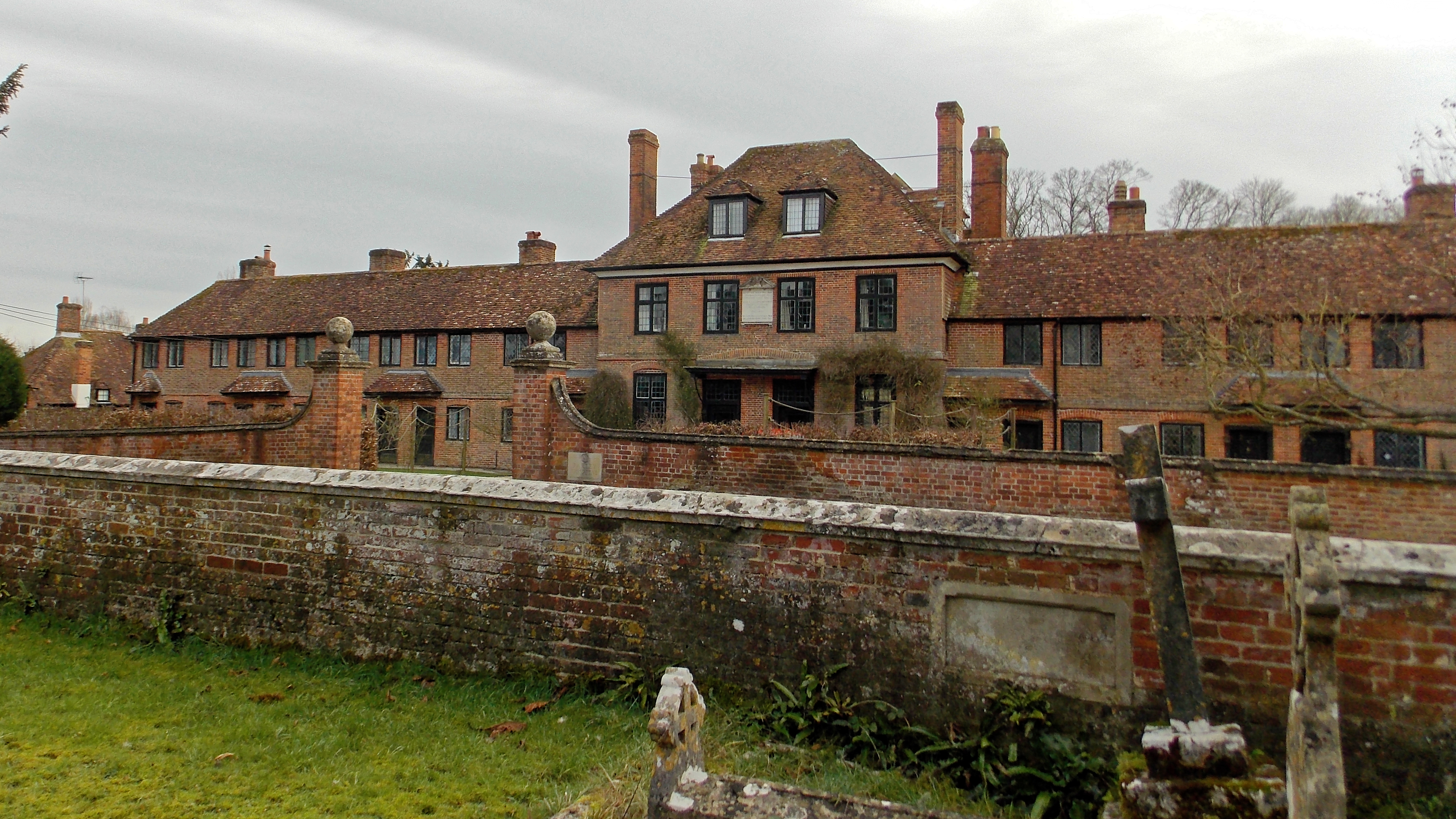
"Fox's Hospital", Farley, an almshouse founded by Sir Stephen Fox

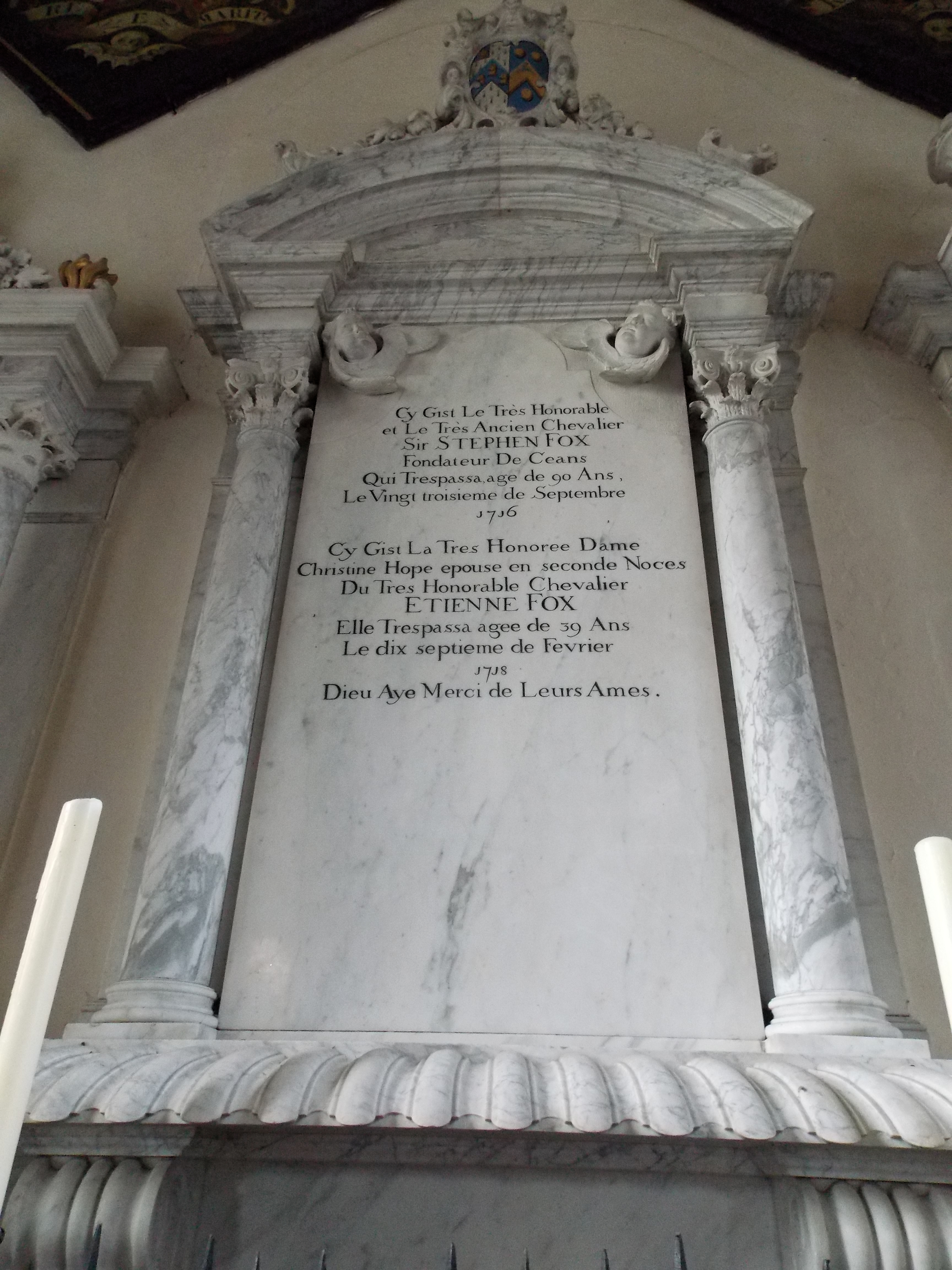
Mural monument to Sir Stephen Fox and his second wife in the Ilchester Chapel of All Saints Church, Farley. Unusually the inscription is in French, in which language he was proficient, reflecting the time he spent in France with the exiled King Charles II. He built the church c. 1688–90, to the design of Sir Christopher Wren and effected by master mason Alexander Fort. He is called on it the fondateur de céans "founder of this place"

Stephen Fox was sixth but fourth surviving son of William Fox, of Farley, Wiltshire, a yeoman farmer, by his wife Elizabeth Pavey, a daughter of Thomas Pavy of Plaitford, Hampshire. His eldest surviving brother was John Fox (1611–1691), Clerk of the Acatry to King Charles II. Stephen's sister was Jane Fox (1639–1710), who married Nicholas Johnson (died 1682), who was Paymaster-General of His Majesty's Forces from 1680 to 1682, following Stephen Fox's second shorter term in that office.

== Career ==
Stephen was a Chorister of Salisbury Cathedral in Wiltshire (c. 1634 – c. 1640) and was mentioned in John Evelyn's Diary as a poore boy from the quire of Salisbury. His elder brother John Fox had obtained a position in the royal court on the recommendation of the Dean of Salisbury Cathedral, and first introduced his younger brother Stephen to the royal court, specifically to the household of the royal children, as "supernumerary servant and play-fellow". At the age of fifteen Stephen obtained a post in the household of Algernon Percy, 10th Earl of Northumberland; then he entered the service of Lord Percy, the earl's younger brother, and was present with the royalist army at the Battle of Worcester as Lord Percy's deputy at the ordnance board. Accompanying King Charles II in his flight to the continent, he was appointed manager of the royal household on the recommendation of Edward Hyde, 1st Earl of Clarendon. Clarendon described him as "a young man bred under the severe discipline of Lord Percy ... very well qualified with languages, and all other parts of clerkship, honesty and discretion".

The skill with which Fox managed the finances of the exiled court earned him further confidence and promotion. He was employed on several important missions, and acted eventually as intermediary between the king and General Monck. Honours and emolument were his reward after the Restoration of the monarchy; he was appointed to the lucrative offices of First Clerk of the Green Cloth and Paymaster of the Forces.

=== Paymaster of the Forces ===
Immediately on his Restoration, King Charles II struggled to fund the new standing army, a concept invented by Oliver Cromwell during the Civil War and the following Commonwealth. The problem was solved by Fox, who was deemed "one of the financial wizards of his age", and from 1654 to 1660 had managed the finances of the exiled king with great success.

The king established a new office of Paymaster of the Forces, of which Fox was the first occupant, with premises in a wing of Horseguards in Whitehall. His success in restoring the financial position of the army stemmed from his ability to raise credit in the City of London, largely thanks to his reputation for honesty and reliability, which would later be repaid to him by the Treasury, when Parliament so voted. The yield from bills passed to this effect were often below that forecast, which in the absence of loans would leave the troops unpaid. Fox, however, was personally liable for the loans he raised, and to compensate him for the great risks he undertook, he was allowed to retain certain profits on his repayment by the Treasury. He charged the Treasury 6% on the funds he had borrowed, but much of that he repaid to his own creditors.

He was allowed other perquisites, including 2% bonus on capital and interest repaid to him by the Treasury, and "poundage" from 1667 which allowed him to retain 4 pence, and from 1668 one shilling, in every pound of army pay, ostensibly to cover administration costs, but in reality mostly profit. This therefore amounted to one twentieth of all army pay, an annual income for Fox of about £7,000, added to his official salary of £400 per annum, and whatever he could save from borrowing at rates below 6%. In just 20 months from January 1665 to September 1666 he advanced a total of £221,000 for army pay, on repayment of which he received interest from the Treasury of almost £13,000. In addition he received a further 2% bonus, worth another £3,000 and also poundage. This office he held for 15 years between 1661 and 1676, and for another year in 1679–1680.

=== Political career ===
In November 1661 he became a Member of Parliament for Salisbury. In 1665 he was knighted; was returned as a Member of Parliament for Westminster on 27 February 1679, and succeeded the Earl of Rochester as a Commissioner of the Treasury, filling that office for twenty-three years and during three reigns. In 1672 he bought the manor of Redlynch in Somerset, where he built a new house in 1708–1709.

In 1680 he resigned the paymastership and was made First Commissioner of Horse. In 1684 he became sole Commissioner of Horse. He was offered a peerage by King James II, on condition of converting to Roman Catholicism, but refused, in spite of which he was allowed to retain his commissionerships. In 1685 he was again an MP for Salisbury, and opposed the bill for a standing army supported by the king. During the Glorious Revolution, he maintained an attitude of decent reserve, but on James's flight, he submitted to the new King William III, who confirmed him in his offices. He was again elected for Westminster in 1691 and 1695, for Cricklade in 1698, and finally in 1713 once more for Salisbury.

It is his distinction to have founded Royal Hospital Chelsea, to which he contributed £13,000. As a statesman he was second-rate, but as a public servant he creditably discharged all the duties with which he was entrusted. Unlike some other statesmen of his day, he grew rich in the service of the nation without being suspected of corruption or forfeiting the esteem of his contemporaries.

== Marriages and children ==
Fox married twice:

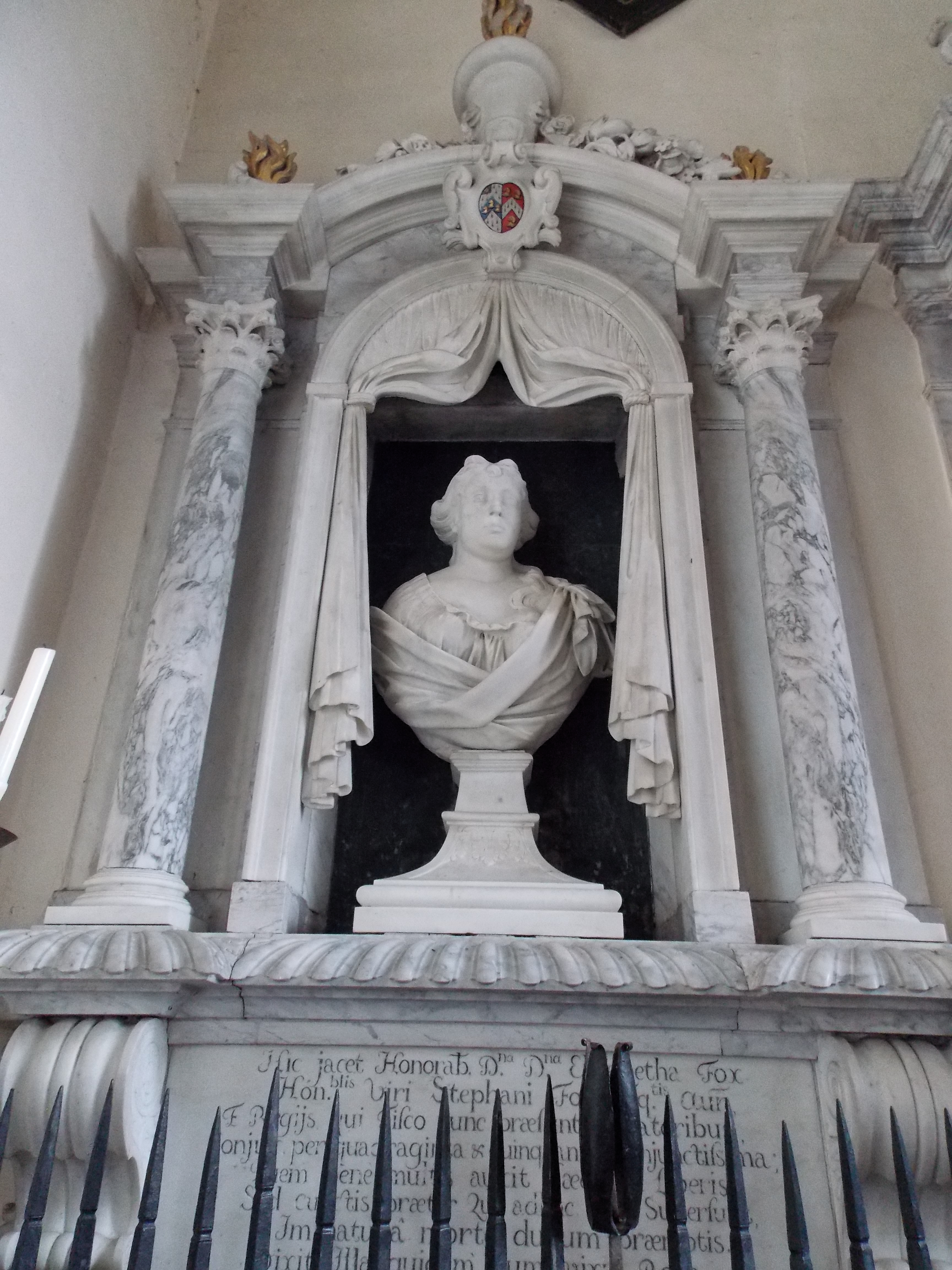
Mural monument to Elizabeth Whittle (d.1696), first wife of Sir Stephen Fox, in the Ilchester Chapel of Farley Church

- Firstly on 8 December 1651, at the age of 24, to Elizabeth Whittle (died 11 August 1696), a daughter of William Whittle of the City of London, whose mural monument with bust survives in the Ilchester Chapel of Farley Church. His niece Margaret Fox (buried on 22 June 1729), a daughter of his elder brother John, also married a member of the Whittle family. By Elizabeth Whittle he had seven sons, all of whom predeceased him, and three daughters, including:
  - William Fox (1660–1680), eldest son, a captain in the army. A mural monument survives in the north cloister of Westminster Abbey inscribed in Latin and translated as follows: "Near this place, among the ashes of their three brothers Edward, John and Stephen, sleep William and James Fox, sons of the Honorable Sir Stephen Fox, Kt. and Elizabeth his wife. Parents and sons worthy each other, whom love made one in life, one distemper in death and one grave in burial. Each of them was embellished with useful learning, which their modesty seemed to conceal, and in their youth the man grew up with them. They were born for their country and to honours, which the eldest, being Captain in the army, acquired by his fatigues over all England. William died April 17, 1680 aged 20. James died November 19, 1677 aged 13".
  - Charles Fox (1660–1713), 2nd son, a Member of Parliament for Salisbury and Paymaster of the Forces to Kings James II, William III and to Queen Anne. His mural monument survives in the Ilchester Chapel of Farley Church.
  - Edward Fox (1663–1669), 4th son, died aged six, buried with his brother John Fox in Westminster Abbey, where survives his gravestone in the cloisters inscribed: Here lie interred two Children of the right Worshipful Sir Stephen Fox of Farley in the County of Wilts Knight, viz. Edward Fox, his fourth Son, aged six years and one month, who died on the nineteenth day of Octob. 1669. and John Fox his sixth son of the age of one year, who deceased upon the seventeenth day of Novemb. in the year of our Lord 1667.
  - James Fox (1665–1677), 5th son, died of smallpox on 19 November 1677 aged 12, buried in the cloister of Westminster Abbey, where survives his mural monument inscribed in Latin as follows: Hic infra situs est, juxta Edwardi, Johannis, & Stephani, trium fratrum cineres, selectissimus Adolescentulus Jacobus Fox, honoratissimi Domini Steph. Fox Equiti Aurati & Elizabethae uxoris, filius natu quintus, parentes filio & filius parentibus quam dignissimus. Summa pietate, vel puer quoad Deum; singulari studio erga parentes, prisca simplicitate inter omnes, percarum Veneri & Apollini caput, indubitatus Adonis & Hyacinthus necnon per dotes animi & corporis, nunc Dei olim hominum amasius. O parentes miseremini parentum. O filii ex illo transcribite filium! O posteri vestrum deflete damnum. Vario literaturae genere excultus admirandi sua floruit Antithesis. Sub puero vir delituit alter in vitae cunabulis & in morte Hercules, dum morbillorum perfidia sublatus, videatur ex igne & tunicâ molestâ evolasse ad coelos. A. D. 13. Cal. Decemb. Anno Dom. 1677. aetatis 12. cum semisse. ("Here below is situated, near the ashes of his three brothers Edward, John and Stephen, the most select youth James Fox, the fifth-born son of the Hon. Sir Stephen Fox, Knight, and of his wife Elizabeth, parents to son and son to parents most worthy.... He was a man even while he was a child and an Hercules both in his cradle and at his death").
  - John Fox (1666–1667), 6th son, died aged one, as recorded on his gravestone in Westminster Abbey.
  - Stephen Fox (died October 1675), died an infant, as recorded om his monument in Westminster Abbey.
  - Elizabeth Fox (c. 1655 – 28 February 1681), born at Tunbridge Wells, who in Westminster Abbey on 27 December 1673 married Charles Cornwallis, 3rd Baron Cornwallis (1655 – 29 April 1698), of Brome Hall in Suffolk. Her great-grandson was General Charles Cornwallis, 1st Marquess Cornwallis. Her mural monument with relief-sculpted bust survives in St Mary's Church, Brome.
  - Jane Fox (died 10 June 1721), wife of George Compton, 4th Earl of Northampton.
  - 3rd daughter, died young.
- Secondly on 11 July 1703, aged 76, he married Christiana Hope (died 17 February 1718), a daughter of Rev. Francis Hope, Rector of Aswarby, Lincolnshire, by his wife Christian Palfreyman. On her husband's monument in Farley Church are displayed (impaled by Fox) the arms of the Scottish Clan Hope: Azure, a chevron or between three bezants. By Christiana Hope he had two sons and two daughters, including:
  - Stephen Fox-Strangways, 1st Earl of Ilchester (1704–1776), eldest son, of Redlynch Park in Somerset, created Baron Ilchester and Stavordale in 1747 and Earl of Ilchester in 1756. In 1758 he took the additional surname of Strangways and his descendants, the family of Fox-Strangways, still hold the Earldom of Ilchester. They also still hold part of the valuable central London "Holland House estate", acquired by them on the extinction of the junior line of the Barons Holland.
  - Henry Fox, 1st Baron Holland (1705–1774), of Holland House in Kensington, who followed his father into politics. Father of the Whig statesman Charles James Fox.
  - Charlotte Fox (died November 1778), wife of Hon. Edward Digby (died 1746), MP, of Wandsworth, 3rd son of William Digby, 5th Baron Digby.
  - Christiana Fox (1705–1707), twin of Henry Fox, died an infant.

== Residences and estates ==
Fox had the following residences and estates:

- Farley, Wiltshire, his paternal estate and burial place.
- The manor of Plaitford, Hampshire, purchased in 1679 from its lord, Richard Compton, which remained a possession of his descendants until 1911 when it was sold to its tenants by Giles Fox-Strangways, 6th Earl of Ilchester.

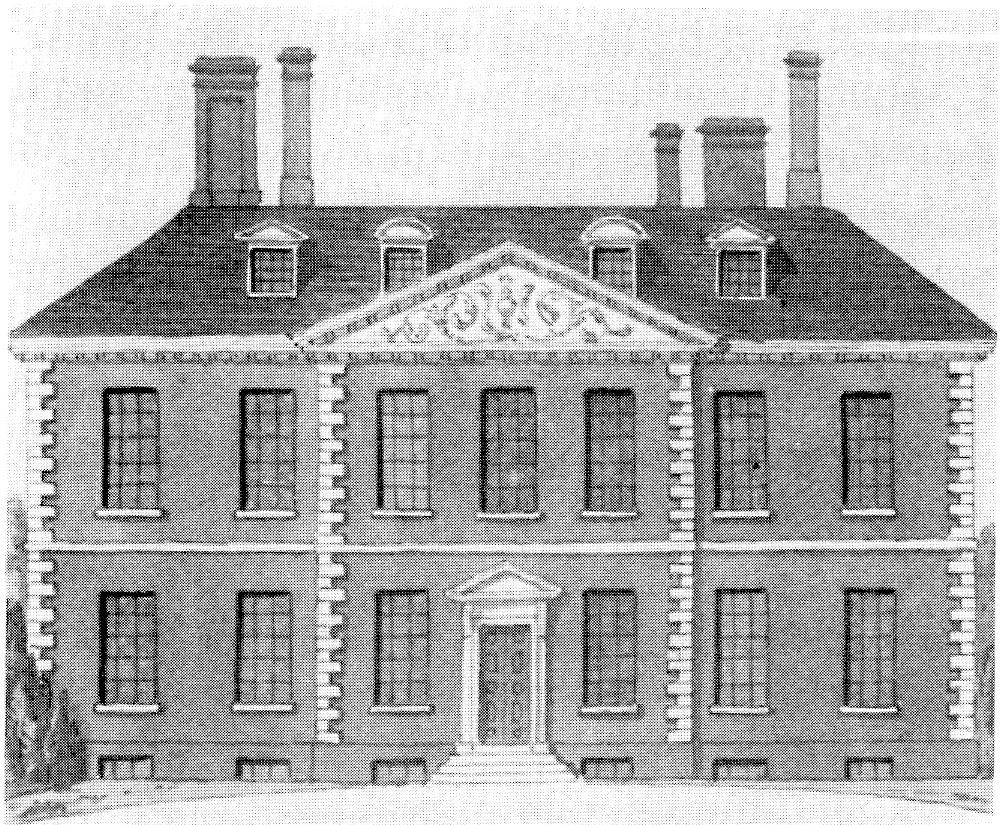
Fox's house in Chiswick, depicted in 1807

- Chiswick, Middlesex, to the west of London, where in 1682–1686, at a cost of £7,117 4s 3d, he built a house described in 1725 by Daniel Defoe as "the flower of all the private gentlemens' palaces in England". Fox had purchased at first, in 1663, only two acres for £1,797 13s., on which stood a house having 18 hearths, which he demolished, next to the large Jacobean Chiswick House, then owned by the Duke of Monmouth, but which was later acquired by the 1st Earl of Burlington in 1682. In 1666 he purchased more adjoining land from the Duke of Monmouth for stables, and in 1685 he purchased the lease of the prebendal manor of Chiswick, comprising a further 140 acres. In 1726–1729 the old Jacobean Chiswick House was demolished and replaced by the famous Palladian villa of Chiswick House, built and designed by Richard Boyle, 3rd Earl of Burlington (1694–1753), where by coincidence died Fox's famous grandson Charles James Fox in 1806. Fox's architect was Hugh May, with a distinguished team of craftsmen including Antonio Verrio and Grinling Gibbons. Fox's house was purchased and demolished in about 1812 by the Duke of Devonshire, then the owner of Chiswick House, but the walled gardens survive as part of Chiswick House grounds. The gardens were much admired by King William III as recorded by Daniel Defoe, who wrote as follows regarding "Sir Stephen Fox's gardens at Istleworth" (i.e. Chiswick):

Of Sir Stephen's garden, this was to be said, that almost all his fine ever-greens were raised in the places where they stood; Sir Stephen taking as much delight to see them rise gradually, and form them into what they were to be, as to buy them of the nursery gardeners, finish' d to his hand; besides that by this method his greens, the finest in England, cost him nothing but the labour of his servants, and about ten years patience; which if they were to have been purchased, would not have cost so little as ten thousand pounds, especially at that time: It was here that King William was so pleased that according to his majesty's usual expression, when he lik'd a place very well, he stood, and looking round him from the head of one of the canals, Well says his majesty, I cou'd dwell here five days; every thing was so exquisitely contrived, finish'd, and well kept, that the king, who was allow'd to be the best judge of such things then living in the world, did not so much as once say, this or that thing cou'd have been better.

After Fox's death in 1716 it was sold to the Countess of Northampton, the mother-in-law of Fox's daughter Jane. It was later re-named Moreton Hall after a later 18th-century owner.

- Redlynch, Somerset, an estate Fox acquired in 1672 in settlement of a debt due from the Gorges family. In 1688 he commenced repairs to the large 16th-century house then standing. In 1708/9 he commenced building a new house adjacent to the old one, to the designs of the architect Thomas Fort, and also developed the formal gardens.
- Palace of Whitehall, Westminster, where before 1677 he rebuilt his lodgings at his own expense.

== Other building works ==
Fox constructed further buildings including:

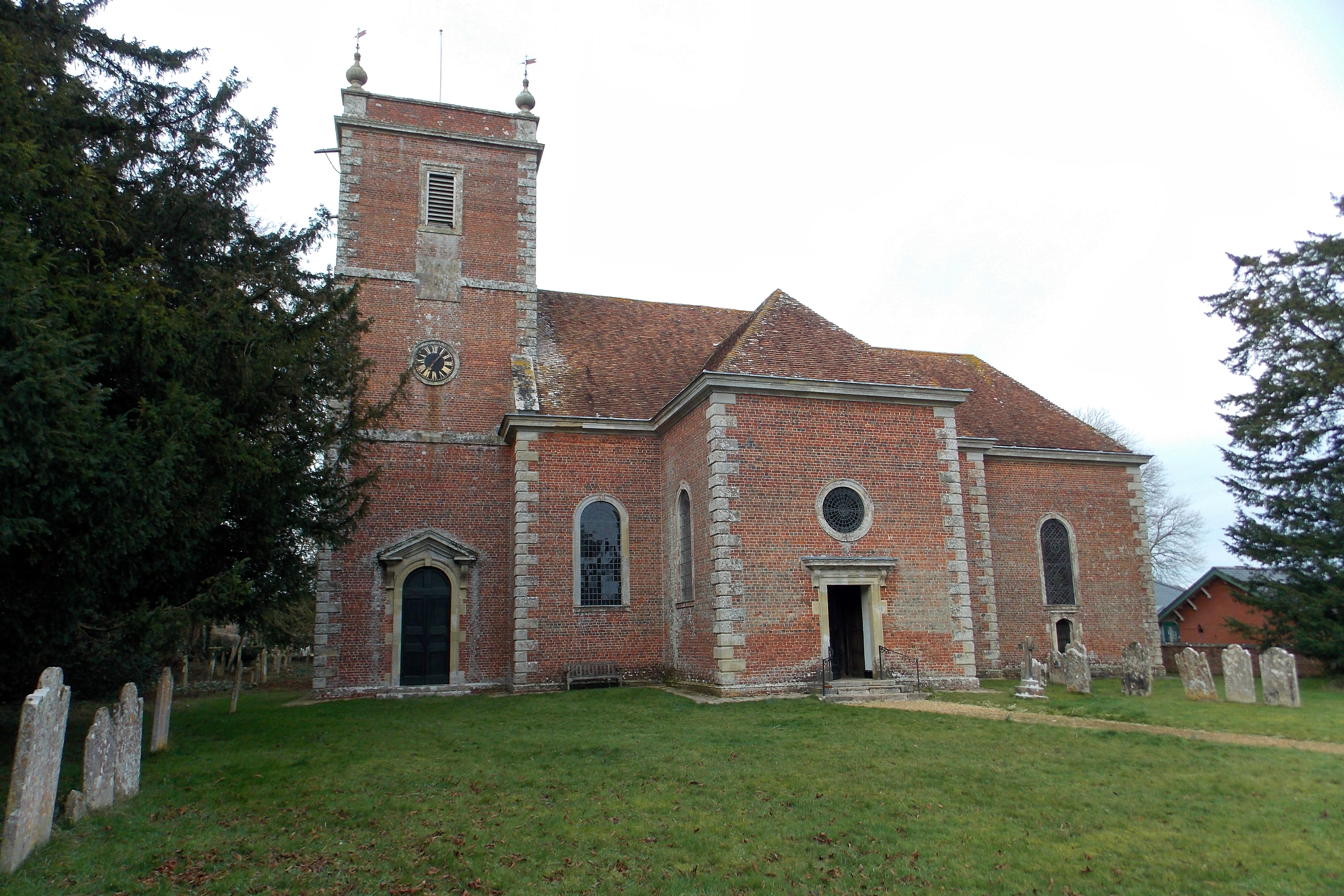
All Saints Church, Farley, built 1688–90 by Sir Stephen Fox to the design of Sir Christopher Wren. It contains the "Ilchester Chapel", burial place of Fox and many of his descendants

- All Saints Church, Farley, 1688–1690, to the design of Sir Christopher Wren, probably with Alexander Fort, Joiner to His Majesty's Office of Works. He obtained a private act of Parliament to make it into a parish church, as it replaced a mere chapel of ease to the adjoining parish of Alderbury.
- Fox's Hospital, Farley, an almshouse with schoolroom, 1688–1690, by Alexander Fort, Joiner to His Majesty's Office of Works. Total cost £1835.8s.8d. Established for six poor women, with a master, and a free-school, the master to be a clergyman, and to officiate in the church. Continues to operate as a charity. A stone tablet below a broken pediment containing a bust of a winged putto, affixed to the external wall above the central doorway, is inscribed in Latin as follows

Deo Opt(imo) Max(imo) bonarum omnium largitori isthoc quantulumcumque grati animi monumentum acceptum refert scholae huius et ptochotrophii fundator humilis gratabundus Anno Salutis reparatae MDCLXXXI quid tibi divitiae prosunt quas congeris hospes solas quas dederis semper habebis opes.

("To God, most good, most great, liberal giver of all (things) good, of a thankful soul the humble and fully-grateful founder gives back what is received this how unimportant monument of this school and place for maintaining the poor restored in the Year of Salvation 1681. For what are riches useful to you, you will bring together a guest/stranger, what thou hast given alone shall be eternal riches unto thee" (last sentence from Epigrams of Martial, XLII (solas quas dederis semper habebis opes))

- A contribution of £13,000 towards the building of the Royal Hospital Chelsea, designed by Sir Christopher Wren.
- In 1698, Fox built Manor Farm House in Chiswick, to replace the previous manor house on Chiswick Mall (which is shown on a map in Warwick Draper's book). It was southeast of Chiswick House, roughly where Edensor Gardens are today. The map names it "Sir Stephen Fox’s 1st house". Fox was the lord of Chiswick's prebendal manor at the time. The house survived until 1896 when it was demolished to build Wilton Avenue. Some of the wall of the farm exists today as garden walls in Manor Alley. Almost next door to it on the Sulhamstead Estate is a modern block of flats called Stephen Fox House.

== Death and burial ==
Fox died on 28 October 1716, aged 89, at his house in Chiswick. He was buried in the Church he rebuilt at Farley, where survives his mural monument. He left assets with an estimated value of over £174,000. (equivalent to over £30,908,146 in 2025).

== Sources ==
- Sir Egerton Brydges, Collins's peerage of England; genealogical, biographical, and historical (1812) pp. 529–538

Parliament of England
| Preceded by Edward Tooker; Francis Swanton | Member of Parliament for Salisbury; 1661–1679; With: Edward Tooker 1661–1664; Edward Hyde 1664–1665; Richard Colman 1665–1673; William Swanton 1673–1679 | Succeeded by Sir Thomas Mompesson; Alexander Thistlethwayte |
| Preceded by Sir Philip Warwick; Sir Richard Everard | Member of Parliament for Westminster; 1679; With: Sir William Pulteney | Succeeded by Sir William Pulteney; Francis Wythens |
| Preceded by Alexander Thistlethwayte; John Wyndham | Member of Parliament for Salisbury; 1685–1689; With: John Wyndham | Succeeded by Thomas Hoby; Giles Eyre |
| Preceded by Sir William Pulteney; Sir Walter Clarges | Member of Parliament for Westminster; 1691–1698; With: Sir Walter Clarges 1691–1695; Charles Montagu 1695–1698 | Succeeded by Charles Montagu; James Vernon |
| Preceded by Charles Fox; Edward Pleydell | Member of Parliament for Cricklade; 1699–1702; With: Edward Pleydell 1699–1701; Edmund Dunch 1701–1702 | Succeeded by Thomas Richmond Webb; Samuel Barker |
Parliament of Great Britain
| Preceded by Charles Fox; Richard Jones | Member of Parliament for Salisbury; 1714–1715; With: Richard Jones | Succeeded by Francis Swanton; Edmund Lambert |
Political offices
| Preceded by — | Paymaster of the Forces; 1661–1676 | Succeeded by Sir Henry Puckering Newton |
| Preceded by Sir Henry Puckering Newton | Paymaster of the Forces; 1676–1679 | Succeeded by Nicholas Johnson |
| Preceded by Nicholas Johnson | Paymaster of the Forces; 1679–1680 | Succeeded by William Fox |
