= Nadine Sarter =

German-American industrial engineer

Nadine Barbara Sarter (born 1959) is a German-American industrial engineer interested in multimodal interaction, touch user interfaces, aircraft cockpit controls, and the ergonomics of human-machine interfaces. She is Richard W. Pew Collegiate Professor of Industrial & Operations Engineering at the University of Michigan, where she directs the Center for Ergonomics and is also affiliated with the Robotics Institute and Department of Aerospace Engineering.

== Education and career ==
Sarter earned bachelor's and master's degree in psychology at the University of Hamburg in Germany, in 1981 and 1983 respectively. She worked in human factors and ergonomics in Germany for several years before emigrating to the US with her husband, psychologist Martin Sarter, and returning to graduate study in engineering. She completed a Ph.D. in industrial and systems engineering at Ohio State University in 1994, under the supervision of David Woods.

After completing her doctorate, she became an assistant professor of mechanical and industrial engineering in the Beckman Institute for Advanced Science and Technology at the University of Illinois at Urbana–Champaign, affiliated with the Institute of Aviation there. In 1999 she returned to Ohio State University as a faculty member, with joint appointments in the Department of Industrial, Welding, and Systems Engineering and Department of Psychology. She moved again to the University of Michigan in 2004.

== Books ==
Sarter is a coauthor of the book Behind Human Error (Ashgate, 2011), and a coeditor of Cognitive Engineering in the Aviation Domain (CRC Press, 2020).

== Recognition ==
Sarter was named a Fellow of the Human Factors and Ergonomics Society in 2017. She was elected a member of the National Academy of Engineering in 2019 in recognition of her "innovation in the design and use of tactile displays for improved safety in aviation, automobiles, and healthcare".
