= John Fox (cricketer, born 1851) =

English cricketer

Personal information
- Born: 10 March 1851; County Armagh, Ireland
- Died: 10 August 1929 (aged 78); Somerset
- Batting: Right-handed

Domestic team information
- Years: Team
- 1872: Gloucestershire
- Source: Cricinfo, 4 April 2014

John Fox (10 March 1851 – 10 August 1929) was an English cricketer who played two matches for Gloucestershire in 1872.
