= John Fox (minister) =

English nonconformist minister

- Occupation: Nonconformist minister

John Fox (fl. 1676) was an English nonconformist minister.

== Biography ==
Fox took the degree of B.A. at Cambridge, as a member of Clare Hall, in 1624 (Notes and Queries, 2nd ser. v. 438). During the Commonwealth he held the vicarage of Pucklechurch, Gloucestershire. After his ejectment in 1662 he became pastor of a congregation at Nailsworth in the same county. He is the author of two treatises of considerable merit, entitled:

- 'Time, and the End of Time. Or Two Discourses: The first about Redemption of Time, the second about Consideration of our latter End,' 12mo, London, 1670 (many subsequent editions). It was translated into Welsh by S. Williams, 8vo, yng Ngwrecsam, 1784.
- 'The Door of Heaven opened and shut. . . . Or, A Discourse [on Matt. xxv. 10] concerning the Absolute Necessity of a timely Preparation for a Happy Eternity,' 12mo, London, 1676 (and again in 1701).

He has been frequently confused with John Foxe the ' martyr-maker.
