= Paymaster of the Forces =

Former position in the British government

Paymaster General of His Majesty's Forces
- Office of HM Paymaster of the Forces
- Style: The Right Honourable
- Appointer: The Sovereign, on the advice of the Prime Minister
- Inaugural holder: Sir Stephen Fox
- Formation: 18 March 1661
- Abolished: 1 December 1836
- Succession: Paymaster General

The Paymaster of the Forces was a position in the British government. The office was established in 1661, one year after the Restoration of the Monarchy to Charles II of England, and was responsible for part of the financing of the British Army, in the improved form created by Oliver Cromwell during the Commonwealth. The full title was Paymaster-General of His Majesty's Forces. It was abolished in 1836, near the end of the reign of William IV, and was replaced by the new post of Paymaster General.

== History ==
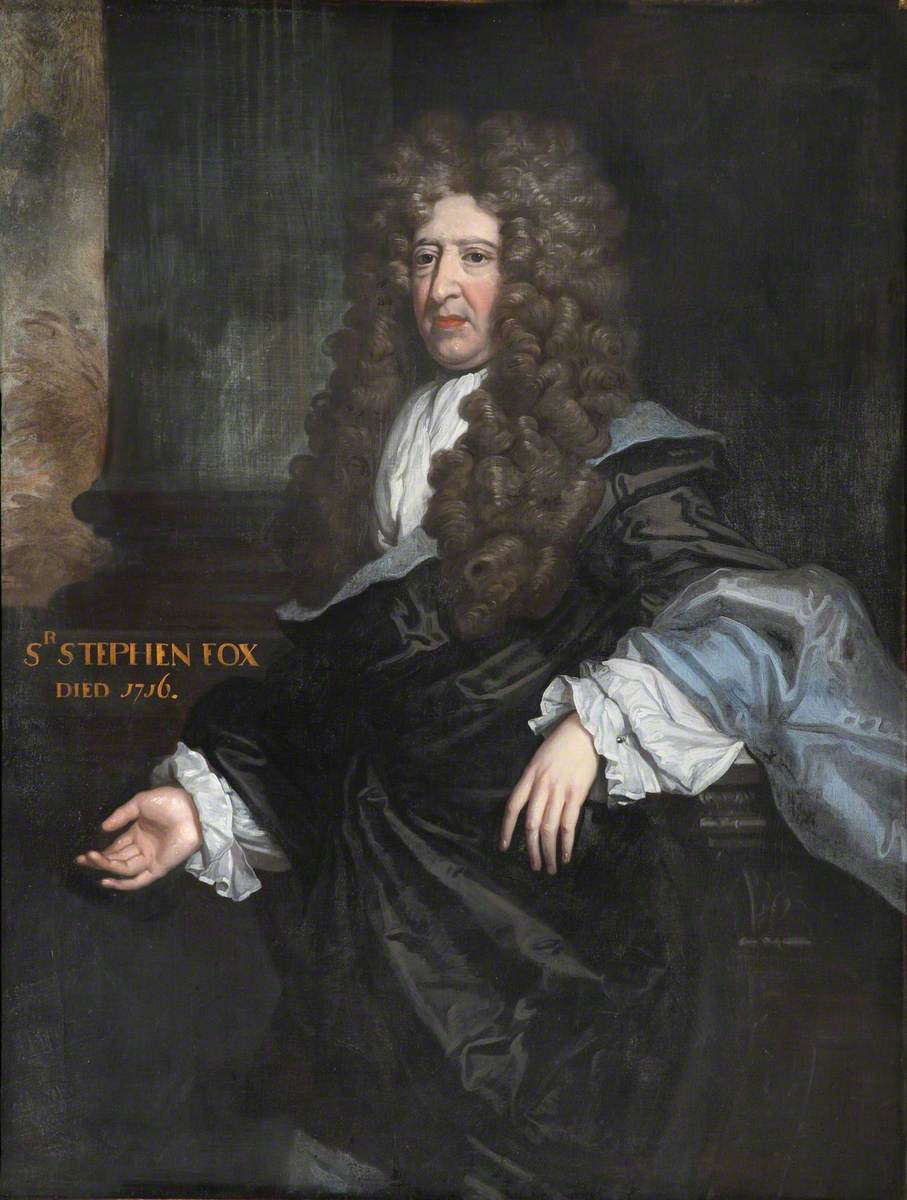
Sir Stephen Fox (1627–1716), first Paymaster of the Forces

The first to hold the office was Sir Stephen Fox (1627–1716), an exceptionally able administrator who had remained a member of the household of King Charles II during his exile in France. Before his time, and before the Civil War, there was no standing army and it had been the custom to appoint treasurers-at-war, ad hoc, for campaigns. Within a generation of the Restoration, the status of the paymastership began to change. In 1692 the then paymaster, Richard Jones, 1st Earl of Ranelagh, was made a member of the Privy Council; and thereafter every paymaster, or when there were two paymasters at least one of them, joined the Privy Council if not already a member. From the accession of Queen Anne the paymaster tended to change with the government. By the 18th century the office had become a political prize and potentially the most lucrative that a parliamentary career could obtain. Appointments to the office were therefore made often not due to merit alone, but also to political affiliation. It was occasionally a cabinet-level post in the 18th and early 19th centuries, and many future prime ministers served as paymaster.

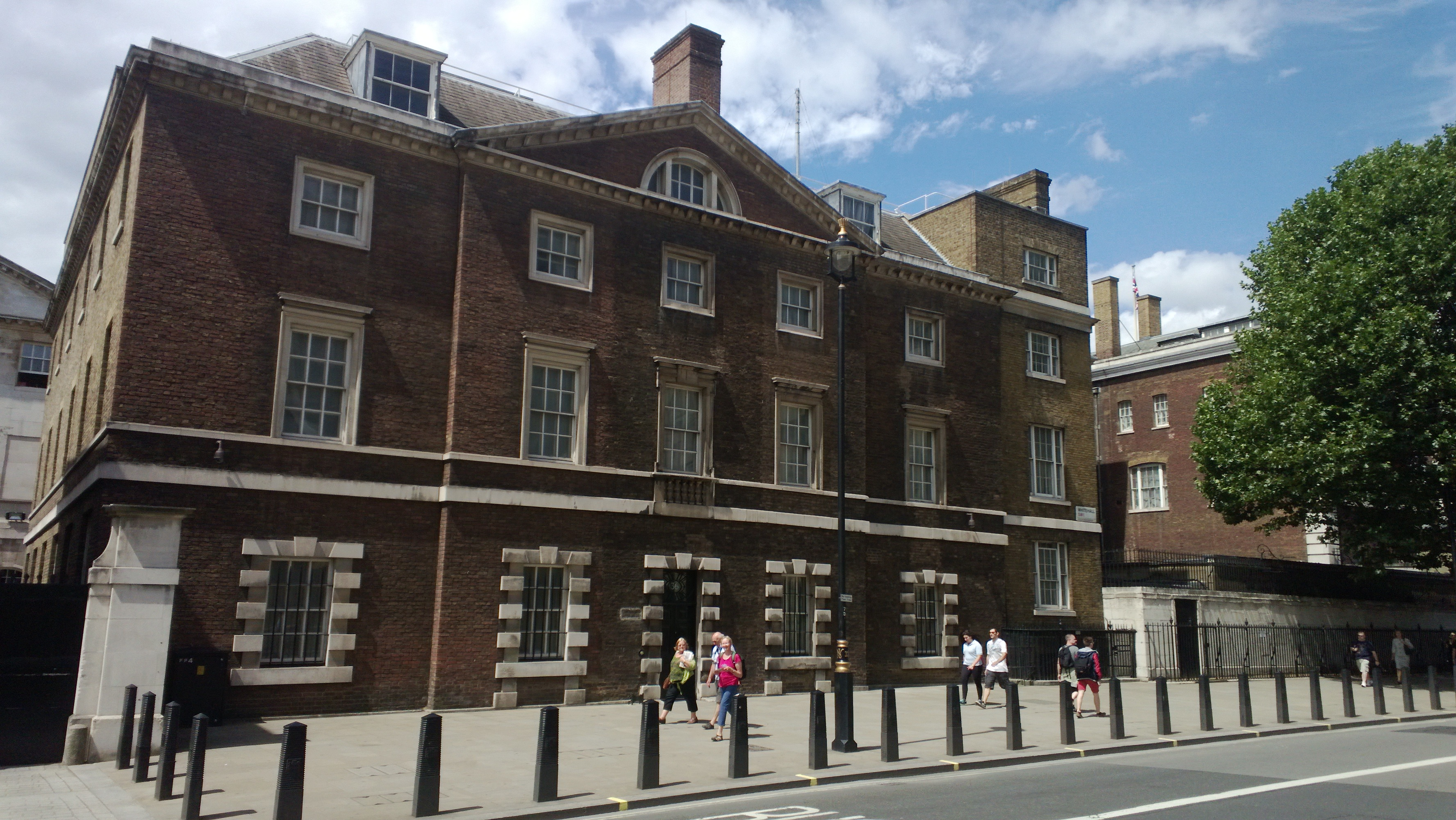
A wing of the Horse Guards, Whitehall, used to accommodate the Paymaster to the Forces; rebuilt in 1732, the building went on to accommodate the Paymaster General's Office until 1939.

Before the development of the banking system, the duty of the paymaster was to act as the personal sole domestic banker of the army. He received, mainly from the Exchequer, the sums voted by Parliament for military expenditure. Other sums were also received, for example from the sale of old stores. He disbursed these sums, by his own hands or by deputy paymasters, under the authority of sign-manual warrants for ordinary expenses of the army, and under Treasury warrants for extraordinary expenses (expenses unforeseen and unprovided for by Parliament).

During the whole time in which public money was in his hands, from the day of receipt until the receipt of his final discharge (the quietus of the Pipe Office), he assumed unlimited personal liability for the funds, thus his private estate was liable for the money in his hands. Failing the quietus this liability remained without limit of time, passing on his death to his heirs and legal representatives.

Appointments were made by the Crown by letters patent under the Great Seal. The patent salary was £400 from 1661 to 1680 and 20 shillings a day thereafter, except for the years 1702–07 when it was fixed at 10 shillings a day.

The office of Paymaster of the Forces was abolished in 1836 and superseded with the formation of the post of Paymaster General.

== List of Paymasters of the Forces ==
Portrait	Name(s)	Term of office		Government	Monarch (Reign)
	Sir Stephen Fox (Note: Knighted 1 July 1665)	18 March 1661	9 February 1676	Clarendon Cabal Danby I	Charles II (1660–1685)
	Sir Henry Puckering, 3rd Baronet	9 February 1676	23 May 1679	//	Charles II (1660–1685)
	Sir Stephen Fox	23 May 1679	3 January 1680	The Chits	Charles II (1660–1685)
	Nicholas Johnson (Note: Brother-in-law of Sir Stephen Fox) and (?) William Fox (died 1680 aged 20) (Note: The second son of Sir Stephen Fox.)	3 January 1680	20 April 1682 (†Johnson); 28 April 1682	The Chits	Charles II (1660–1685)
	Charles Fox (Note: The third son of Sir Stephen Fox.)	28 April 1682	26 December 1685	The Chits	Charles II (1660–1685)
	Richard Jones, 1st Earl of Ranelagh	26 December 1685	22 December 1702	The Chits	James II (1685–1688)
	Richard Jones, 1st Earl of Ranelagh	26 December 1685	22 December 1702	Carmarthen–Halifax Carmarthen Whig Junto I Pembroke	William III and Mary II (1689–1694); William III (1694–1702)
	Richard Jones, 1st Earl of Ranelagh	26 December 1685	22 December 1702	Godolphin–Marlborough	Anne (1702–1714)
	John Grubham Howe (Home troops only) with Charles Fox (1702–05); James Brydges (1705–13); Thomas Moore (1713–14) (Overseas troops)	22 December 1702	3 October 1714	Godolphin–Marlborough	Anne (1702–1714)
	John Grubham Howe (Home troops only) with Charles Fox (1702–05); James Brydges (1705–13); Thomas Moore (1713–14) (Overseas troops)	22 December 1702	3 October 1714	Oxford–Bolingbroke	Anne (1702–1714)
	Sir Robert Walpole	3 October 1714	17 October 1715	Townshend Stanhope–Sunderland I Stanhope–Sunderland II	George I (1714–1727)
	Henry Clinton, 7th Earl of Lincoln	17 October 1715	11 June 1720	Townshend Stanhope–Sunderland I Stanhope–Sunderland II	George I (1714–1727)
	Sir Robert Walpole	11 June 1720	19 April 1721	Townshend Stanhope–Sunderland I Stanhope–Sunderland II	George I (1714–1727)
	Charles Cornwallis, 4th Baron Cornwallis	19 April 1721	20 January 1722	Walpole–Townshend	George I (1714–1727)
	Spencer Compton (Baron Wilmington from 1728)	15 March 1722	15 May 1730	Walpole–Townshend	George I (1714–1727)
	Spencer Compton (Baron Wilmington from 1728)	15 March 1722	15 May 1730	Walpole–Townshend	George II (1727–1760)
	Henry Pelham	15 May 1730	24 December 1743	Walpole Carteret	George II (1727–1760)
	Thomas Winnington	24 December 1743	23 April 1746†	Broad Bottom	George II (1727–1760)
	William Pitt the Elder	7 May 1746	16 December 1755	Broad Bottom	George II (1727–1760)
	William Pitt the Elder	7 May 1746	16 December 1755	Newcastle I	George II (1727–1760)
Dupplin	Henry Vane, 1st Earl of Darlington and Thomas Hay, Viscount Dupplin	16 December 1755	8 December 1756	Newcastle I	George II (1727–1760)
Dupplin	Thomas Hay, Viscount Dupplin and Thomas Potter	8 December 1756	15 July 1757	Pitt–Devonshire 1757 Caretaker	George II (1727–1760)
	Henry Fox, 1st Baron Holland	15 July 1757	12 June 1765	Pitt–Newcastle	George II (1727–1760)
	Henry Fox, 1st Baron Holland	15 July 1757	12 June 1765	Pitt–Newcastle	George III (1760–1820) (Note: The Prince of Wales served as prince regent from 5 February 1811.)
	Henry Fox, 1st Baron Holland	15 July 1757	12 June 1765	Bute Grenville	George III (1760–1820)
	Charles Townshend	12 June 1765	21 August 1766	// Rockingham I Chatham	George III (1760–1820)
North	Frederick North, Lord North and George Cooke	21 August 1766	9 December 1767	//	George III (1760–1820)
Townshend	George Cooke and Thomas Townshend	9 December 1767	5 June 1768 (†Cooke); 17 June 1768	//	George III (1760–1820)
	Richard Rigby	17 June 1768	10 April 1782	// Grafton North	George III (1760–1820)
	Edmund Burke	10 April 1782	1 August 1782	Rockingham II	George III (1760–1820)
	Isaac Barré	1 August 1782	16 April 1783	Shelburne	George III (1760–1820)
	Edmund Burke	16 April 1783	8 January 1784	Fox–North Pitt the Younger I	George III (1760–1820)
	William Wyndham Grenville	8 January 1784	7 April 1784	//	George III (1760–1820)
Mulgrave	William Wyndham Grenville and Constantine Phipps, 2nd Baron Mulgrave	7 April 1784	2 September 1789	//	George III (1760–1820)
Mulgrave	The Lord Mulgrave and James Graham, 3rd Duke of Montrose	2 September 1789	7 March 1791	//	George III (1760–1820)
	Dudley Ryder and Thomas Steele	7 March 1791	5 July 1800	//	George III (1760–1820)
	Thomas Steele and George Canning	5 July 1800	26 March 1801	//	George III (1760–1820)
	Thomas Steele and Sylvester Douglas, 1st Baron Glenbervie	26 March 1801	3 January 1803	Addington	George III (1760–1820)
	Thomas Steele and John Hiley Addington	3 January 1803	7 July 1804	Addington	George III (1760–1820)
	George Rose and Lord Charles Somerset	7 July 1804	17 February 1806	Pitt the Younger II	George III (1760–1820)
	Richard Temple-Nugent-Brydges-Chandos-Grenville, 1st Earl Temple and Lord John Townshend	17 February 1806	4 April 1807	All the Talents	George III (1760–1820)
	Charles Long and Lord Charles Somerset	4 April 1807	26 November 1813	Portland II Perceval Liverpool	George III (1760–1820)
	Charles Long and F. J. Robinson	26 November 1813	9 August 1817	//	George III (1760–1820)
	Charles Long (Baron Farnborough from 1826)	9 August 1817 (continued)	14 July 1826	//	George III (1760–1820)
	Charles Long (Baron Farnborough from 1826)	9 August 1817 (continued)	14 July 1826	//	George IV (1820–1830)
	William Vesey Fitzgerald	14 July 1826	10 July 1828	// Canningite Govt. Canning · Goderich Wellington–Peel	George IV (1820–1830)
	John Calcraft	10 July 1828	30 December 1830	//	George IV (1820–1830)
	Lord John Russell	30 December 1830	30 December 1834	Whig Govt. Grey · Melbourne I	William IV (1830–1837)
	Sir Edward Knatchbull, 9th Baronet	30 December 1834	28 April 1835	Peel I	William IV (1830–1837)
	Sir Henry Parnell, 4th Baronet	28 April 1835	1 December 1836	Melbourne II	William IV (1830–1837)

Office merged into that of Paymaster General, 1836.

== Paymaster of the Forces Abroad ==
From 1702 to 1714, during the War of the Spanish Succession, there was a distinct Paymaster of the Forces Abroad, appointed in the same manner as the Paymaster. These were appointed to a special office to oversee the pay of Queen Anne's army in the Low Countries, and are not in the regular succession of Paymasters of the Forces. The salary of the position was 10 shillings a day. Colonel Thomas Moore was paymaster of the land forces in Minorca and in the garrisons of Dunkirk and Gibraltar and is not always counted among the Paymasters of the Forces Abroad.

- Charles Fox (23 December 1702 – 10 May 1705)
- James Brydges (10 May 1705 – 4 September 1713)
- Col. Thomas Moore (4 September 1713 – 3 October 1714)

== See also ==
- Master-General of the Ordnance
- British Army
- Paymaster General

== Notes and references ==
Notes
