= Martin Sarter =

Martin Sarter is the Charles M. Butter Collegiate Professor of Psychology and Professor of Neuroscience at the University of Michigan. He has been co-editor-in-chief of the European Journal of Neuroscience (EJN).

He is married to Nadine Sarter, the Richard W. Pew Collegiate Professor of Industrial & Operations Engineering at the University of Michigan.
