= John Fox (1611–1691) =

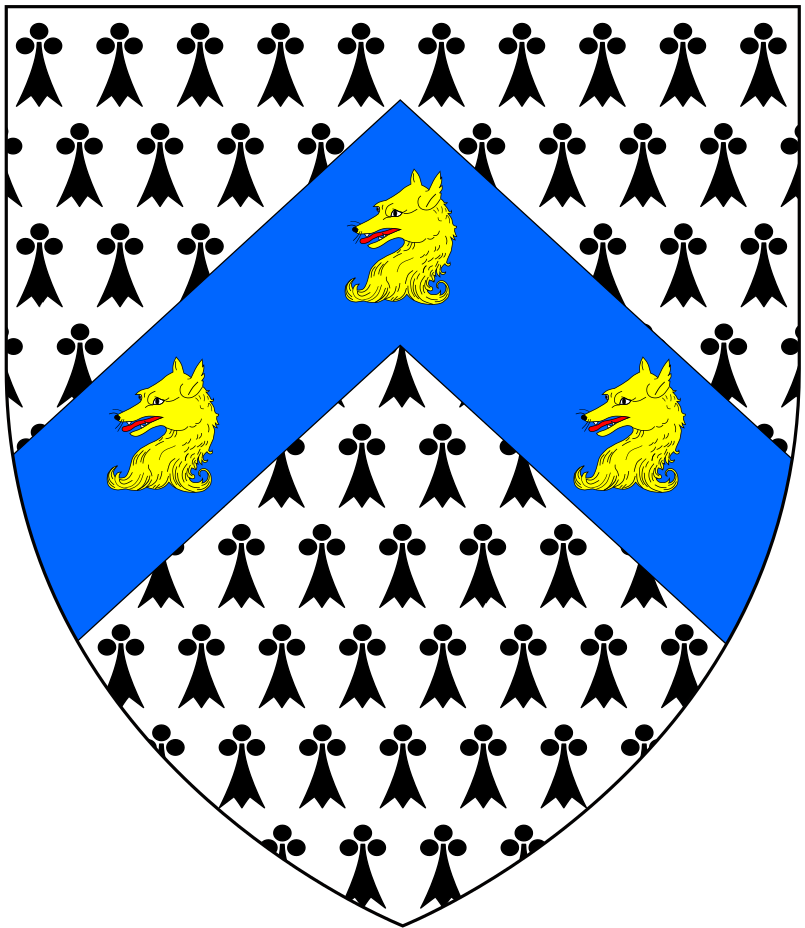
Canting arms of Fox: Ermine, on a chevron azure three fox's heads and necks erased or, as seen on his ledger stone in the cloisters of Westminster Abbey. His brother Sir Stephen Fox, and his descendants, were granted an augmentation of honour in the form of On a canton azure a fleur-de-lys or by King Charles II

John Fox (1611–1691) was Clerk of the Acatry to King Charles II, which below stairs department was responsible for meat destined for the royal tables. In 1660 the department comprised a clerk and a sergeant, appointed by royal warrant, a yeoman of the salt stores, yeomen and grooms, appointed by the Lord Steward's warrant.

== Origins ==
He was the eldest surviving son of William Fox, of Farley, in Wiltshire, a yeoman farmer, by his wife Margaret (or Elizabeth) Pavey. His younger brother was the politician Sir Stephen Fox (1627–1716), the "richest commoner in the three kingdoms" and ancestor of the Earls of Ilchester and Barons Holland.

== Career ==
His position at court was obtained on the recommendation of the Dean of Salisbury Cathedral in Wiltshire, and it was John who first introduced his younger brother Stephen Fox to the royal court, specifically to the household of the royal children, as "supernumerary servant and play-fellow".

== Marriage and progeny ==
He married Elizabeth Smart (buried on 2 January 1707), by whom he had progeny including:

- John Fox, whose son was Thomas Fox (1664-1691), Receiver General of Their Majesties Customs, whose gravestone survives in the north cloister of Westminster Abbey displaying the arms of Fox and inscribed: "Here lyeth interrd the body of Thomas Fox Esq. Receiver General of Their Majesties Customes who departed this life the 18th day of August 1691 in the 27th year of his age".
- Margaret Fox (buried on 22 June 1729), who married a member of the Whittle family.
- Elizabeth Fox, who in Westminster Abbey on 18 May 1665 married Thomas Donkley (buried on 8 February 1689), a Yeoman of His Majesty's Vestry and Closet Keeper.

== Death and burial ==
His gravestone survives in the north cloister of Westminster Abbey, inscribed: "Here lyeth interrd the body of John Fox Esq. who departed this life the 19 day of Novemb. 1691 in the 80 year of his age".
