= John Fox (South African cricketer) =

South African cricketer (1929–2017)

Personal information
- Full name: John Stephen Morley Fox
- Born: 4 July 1929; Durban, South Africa
- Died: 25 May 2017 (aged 87)
- Source: Cricinfo, 17 December 2020

John Fox (4 July 1929 – 25 May 2017) was a South African cricketer. He played in eighteen first-class matches from 1954/55 to 1963/64.
