= John Foxe (neuroscientist) =

Irish neuroscientist (born 1967)

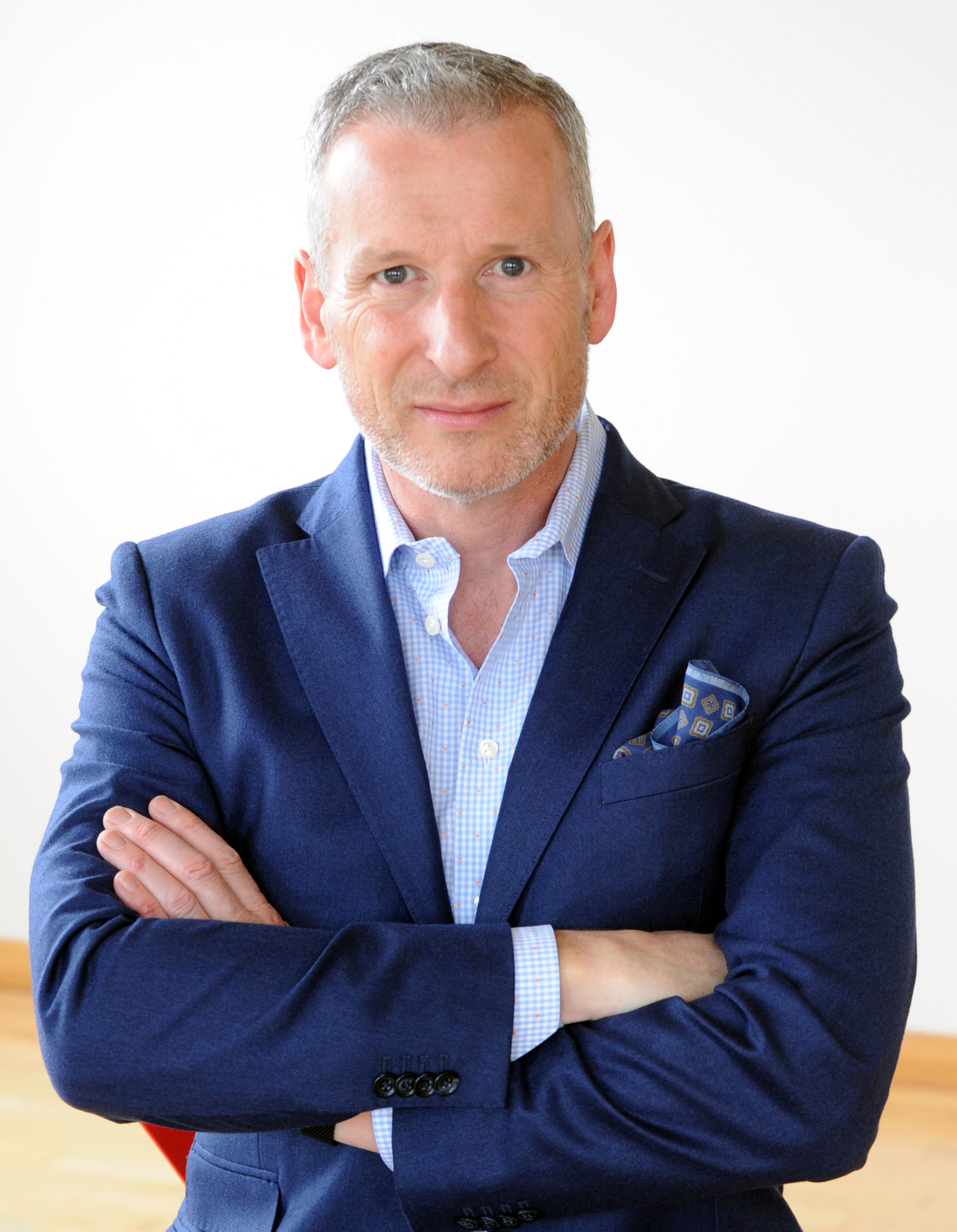
Foxe in 2016

John J. Foxe (born July 1967) is an Irish neuroscientist, who is the Kilian J. and Caroline F. Schmitt Chair in Neuroscience at the University of Rochester in New York, where he is Professor and Chair of the Department of Neuroscience. He is a visiting professor at The Albert Einstein College of Medicine in New York, Trinity College Dublin, City University of New York, and the National University of Ireland at Maynooth. He is the editor-in-chief of the European Journal of Neuroscience.

== Early life and education ==
Foxe was born in Hope Hospital in Manchester, England in 1967 when his parents were training to be psychiatric nurses in the U.K. The family moved back to Dublin, Ireland shortly after his birth where his parents worked at St Brendan's Hospital. He is a brother of the fashion journalist, stylist, and photographer Damian Foxe. He studied English, History, and Mathematics at University College Dublin in 1984 but interrupted his studies there in 1987 after taking up an athletics scholarship at Iona College in New York

He ran with St Brigid's Athletic Club and with UCD. He was two-time Irish intervarsity champion at 800 metres in 1985 and 1986. He was also captain of the UCD athletics club. In 1986, he won the bronze medal at the National Junior Championships in Tullamore, Co Offaly, and the following year, he was the silver medalist in the National Under-21 championship, both at 800 metres. After moving to the U.S., he competed for Iona College and at under-23 level for Ireland. He ran at the Millrose Games at Madison Square Garden and the Penn Relays in Philadelphia.

He graduated from Iona College with a B.Sc. in Experimental Psychology in 1989. He completed his M.Sc. in Neurobiology at the Albert Einstein College of Medicine in 1996 and his PhD studies in Neuroscience at the same college in 1999 with his dissertation: "Neurophysiology of intermodal selective attention in humans."

== Professional biography ==
After completing his PhD, he worked as senior research scientist at the Nathan S. Kline Research Institute where he founded the Cognitive Neurophysiology Laboratory in 1998. He was also a McDonnell-Pew research fellow at the Oxford University Centre for Cognitive Neuroscience and was a visiting research fellow at Trinity College Dublin in Ireland.

In 2004, he became Director of the Program in Cognitive Neuroscience at City College of New York as associate professor. The following year, he became Full Professor with tenure at the college. In 2010, he returned to Albert Einstein College of Medicine and was the inaugural Director of Research at the Children's Evaluation & Rehabilitation Centre and Professor of Paediatrics and Neuroscience at the Sheryl and Daniel R. Tishman Cognitive Neurophysiology Laboratory. He was also co-director of the NICHD-funded Rose F Kennedy Intellectual and Developmental Disabilities Research Center (IDDRC).

In 2015, he moved to the University of Rochester School of Medicine to become inaugural Director of the Del Monte Institute for Neuroscience and chair of the Department of Neuroscience. In 2020, he was involved in the creation of an Intellectual and Developmental Disabilities Research Center in Rochester, where he is currently its director. In June 2024, this center was renamed the Golisano Intellectual and Developmental Disabilities Institute following a $50 million donation, the largest philanthropic gift in University of Rochester history, from businessman and philanthropist, B. Thomas Golisano. Foxe was co-editor-in-chief of the European Journal of Neuroscience with Professor J. Paul Bolam from 2014 until 2020. Since 2020, he has been editor-in-chief of the journal. He was also co-editor in chief of Frontiers in Human Neuroscience from 2014 to 2015. He is the host of the long-running video and podcast series "Neuroscience Perspectives", where he interviews neuroscientists from across the globe.

From 2023 to 2025, he served as Secretary-Treasurer of the Association of Medical School Neuroscience Department Chairs (AMSNDC). He is the Director of the Frederick J. and Marion A. Schindler Cognitive Neuroscience Laboratory at the University of Rochester.

== Research interests & publications ==
He is a researcher who specialises in the basic neurophysiology of neurological and psychiatric conditions. His work focuses on identification of neuro-markers in childhood neuropsychiatric diseases and linking those to the underlying genetics.

He has a h-index of 110 and has more than 45,000 citations. His publications include 'Anticipatory Biasing of Visuospatial Attention Indexed by Retinotopically Specific Alpha-Band Electroencephalography Increases over Occipital Cortex' which has been cited 1,644 times. He is senior author of the paper 'Multisensory auditory–visual interactions during early sensory processing in humans: a high-density electrical mapping study' which has been cited 1,178 times.

Other publications include 'The role of alpha-band brain oscillations as a sensory suppression mechanism during selective attention' with 1,736 citations, 'Flow of activation from V1 to frontal cortex in humans' with 855 citations, and 'Increases in alpha oscillatory power reflect an active retinotopic mechanism for distracter suppression during sustained visuospatial attention' in the Journal of Neurophysiology, which has been cited 864 times.

== Awards and honours ==
He is a member of the executive committee of the International Multisensory Research Forum and was chair of the forum from 2006 to 2007. He is Chairperson of the Neuroscience Peer Review Consortium and has in the past worked with the scientific advisory boards for the Food Research Council of Unilever R&D and as a consultant science advisor with the Parkinson's Disease Foundation in New York. In 2012, he was awarded the Tom Connor Distinguished Investigator Medal by Neuroscience Ireland, Ireland’s National Neuroscience Society.
