= John Fox (cricketer, born 1904) =

English cricketer

Cricket information
- Batting: Left-handed
- Bowling: Slow left arm orthodox

Career statistics
Competition	First-class
Matches	140
Runs scored	2,907
Batting average	16.70
100s/50s	0/8
Top score	73
Balls bowled	5,743
Wickets	46
Bowling average	47.67
5 wickets in innings	0
10 wickets in match	0
Best bowling	4/27
Catches/stumpings	30/0
- Source: Cricinfo, 16 August 2022

John Fox (7 September 1904 – 15 November 1961) was an English cricketer who played 140 first-class matches between the wars, 46 for Warwickshire and 94 for Worcestershire.

Fox made his first-class debut for Warwickshire against Worcestershire at Amblecote in June 1922. In a 223-run Warwickshire win, he made 21 in his only innings and bowled two overs without reward. He then appeared in the extraordinary game against Hampshire at Edgbaston in which Hampshire, having been bowled out for 15, made 521 following on and won by 155 runs. Fox's personal contribution to the match was minimal, although he did take his maiden first-class wicket, that of William Shirley.

Fox played a few more times that season without notable success, and continued to appear sporadically for the next few summers. Although he took a career-best 4–27 against Worcestershire in 1926, it was only the following year that he started to play more regularly, appearing 18 times. He had a terrible season, however, claiming just four wickets at a woeful bowling average of 81.50, while his batting average was pushed above 20 only because of nine not outs in 17 innings. He did play two more games for Warwickshire in 1928, but after that he took the short journey to New Road to play for Worcestershire.

1929, Fox's first season with his new county, was something of a mixed bag: his tally of 505 runs was higher than the aggregate of his career up to that point, and although he averaged only 15.78, he did hit 60 and 19 opening the batting against Glamorgan in late July. His bowling, however, was again unproductive: four wickets at 71. This, however, was followed by unquestionably the best season of Fox's career: in 1930 he scored 861 runs at 22.65 and took 16 wickets at 28.37.

After this, Fox's career gradually declined. Although he was still capable of useful scores, such as the career-best 73 he made against Northamptonshire in May 1931, these were never very frequent and for the last three years of his career he struggled to push his batting average beyond the low teens. Nor could his bowling rescue him: he never again took more than five wickets in a season, and at an average of around 50 runs apiece he was simply too expensive.

Fox played his last first-class match at the end of 1933, against Yorkshire. In a drawn game he made 19 in his only innings and took the single wicket of Arthur Wood.

He was born in Selly Park, Birmingham; he also died in Birmingham, aged 57.
