= Sartre (surname) =

Sartre is a French-language occupational surname. It derives from late Latin sartor, tailor.

The surname may refer to:

- Jean-Paul Sartre (1905–1980), French existentialist philosopher
- Arlette Elkaïm-Sartre (1935–2016), French writer, adopted daughter of Jean-Paul Sartre
- Annie Sartre-Fauriat (born 1947), French historian
- Duran Sartre de Carpentras, 13th-century French troubadour
- Marc-Antoine Sartre (1760–1831), French politician
- Maurice Sartre (born 1944), French historian
- Romain Sartre (born 1982), French footballer
- Victor Sartre (1902–2000), archbishop of Madagascar
