= Whetham, Wiltshire =

Former manor in Calne Without parish, Wiltshire, England

Coordinates: 51.4119°N 2.0312°W

Whetham is a former manor in Derry Hill & Studley parish, Wiltshire, England. No settlement remains beyond a farm, a few cottages and a country house called Whetham House.

== Description ==
Whetham is about 2 miles (3.2 km) south-west of the town of Calne, north of what is now the A3102 road and about 1 mile (1.6 km) east of Sandy Lane village. To the north lies the Bowood House estate. The Whetham stream flows into the estate, where it is dammed to form an artificial lake.

There was a manor house here in the early 15th century or earlier. The present Whetham House was built in the 17th century, probably on an earlier core, and was extended in the 19th century. Built largely of rubble stone, with two storeys and an attic, Historic England states it has a "complex rambling plan". In 1728 there were extensive formal gardens, and a park lay south of the house. The house was approached from the north (along a road which is now a track) or from the London-Bath road to the south. Changes in 1790–1791 brought that road closer to the house.

The farmhouse at Whetham Farm was rebuilt in the early 19th century in squared ironstone. Nearby is a barn from the late 18th century or early 19th, in rubble stone and red brick. There was a mill on the Whetham stream, north-east of the house, but it was demolished in 1817.

== Notable landowners ==
The house was owned by the Fynamore or Fynemore family from the mid-13th century until 1574, then came into the Ernle family. They included Sir John Ernle (1620–1697), MP and long-serving Chancellor of the Exchequer, and his son John (1647–1686), a Navy captain. The latter married Vincentia, daughter of John Kyrle (c.1617–1680), later 2nd Baronet Kyrle, of Homme House, Much Marcle, Herefordshire, thus uniting Whetham with the Kyrle estates in that county. Their son, another John (1682–1725) took the surname Kyrle Ernle. Queen Anne visited the house during his ownership, in 1703.

Constantia Ernle (d.1753) married Viscount Dupplin (later 9th Earl of Kinnoull). Her estates were settled on a son of a cousin, James Money (1724-1785). His descendant James (1775–1843) assumed the surname Kyrle-Money in 1809.

Following the death in 1980 of Roger Money-Kyrle, in 1999 the property was owned by Whetham Estates Ltd on behalf of the Money-Kyrle family. As of 2022 the privately held company continues in business, with several members of the Money-Kyrle family among its directors.

Sir John Ernle (d.1648) obtained the advowson of Yatesbury parish church, east of Calne, where the Fynemore family had an estate from the 16th century. The right continued to be held by the Ernle, Money, and Money-Kyrle families until 1853, when it was sold by William Money-Kyrle.

The farm later called Mile Elm, 20 acres in 1728, was bought by William Money and continued to held by the owners of Whetham House.
