= George Hungerford (MP) =

English country gentleman and member of parliament

Sir George Hungerford (1637–1712), of Cadenham House, Bremhill, Wiltshire, was an English country gentleman and member of parliament.

He was the son of Edward Hungerford(d. 1667) of Cadenham by Susan, daughter of Sir John Pretyman of Driffield, Gloucestershire, sister of Sir John Pretyman, 1st Baronet. He was heir to a minor branch of an extensive and influential family in Wiltshire, which had settled at Bremhill in the 16th century. He matriculated at Christ Church, Oxford in 1653 and was admitted to Lincoln's Inn three years later.

In 1659 he joined his father in sending servants to a rendezvous near Bath for an abortive Royalist uprising in 1659, although neither attended themselves. By April 1661, when he was returned unopposed to represent Cricklade in parliament, he had received a knighthood from Charles II. He was largely inactive during his first term in parliament, but from 1677 he became an increasingly vocal supporter of the Whig faction. In October 1679 he was elected as an Exclusion candidate to represent Calne He continued his opposition to the Crown and was returned for Calne again in March 1681. He appears to have kept a low profile during the short reign of James II, but was returned as knight of the shire for Wiltshire from 1695 to November 1701.

== Family ==
He married Frances (d. 1715), daughter of Charles Seymour, 2nd Baron Seymour of Trowbridge in 1665. They had a large family and he blamed the extravagance of his children for the depletion of his estate. Frances had inherited Soley manor at Chilton Foliat, but the Hungerfords had sold this by 1710. Their eldest son George died in 1698. George was succeeded by his younger son Walter.

Parliament of England
| Preceded by Hungerford Dunch; Nevil Maskelyne | Member of Parliament for Cricklade; 1661–1679; With: John Ernle | Succeeded by Hungerford Dunch; Edmund Webb |
| Preceded by George Lowe; William Duckett | Member of Parliament for Calne; 1679–1685; With: Walter Norborne (1679, 1681–1684); Lionel Duckett (1679–1681) | Succeeded by Sir John Ernle; Thomas Richmond Webb |
| Preceded by Viscount Cornbury; Sir Walter St John | Member of Parliament for Wiltshire; 1695–1701; With: Henry St John (1695–1698); Sir Edward Ernle (1698–1701); Sir Richard Howe (1701) | Succeeded by Maurice Ashley; William Ashe |
