= Norborne =

Norborne may refer to:

- Norborne, Missouri, United States
- Walter Norborne (died 1659), English MP
- Walter Norborne (died 1684), English MP

== See also ==
- Norborne Berkeley (disambiguation)
- Norbourne Estates, Kentucky suburb of Louisville, Kentucky, known as Norbourne
