= Kyrle =

Kyrle may refer to:

- Cosmo Kyrle Bellew (1883–1948), British film actor
- Kyrle Bellew (1850–1911), English stage and silent film actor
- James Kyrle MacCurdy (1875–1923), British theater actor
- James Kyrle-Money (1775–1843), British soldier
- John Kyrle (1637–1724), English philanthropist
- Josef Kyrle (1880–1926), Austrian pathologist
- Martha Kyrle (1917–2017), Austrian physician
- Roger Money-Kyrle (1898–1980), English psychoanalyst
- Rowland Money-Kyrle (1866–1928), English archdeacon
- Walter Kyrle (1600–1650), English politician

== See also ==
- John Kyrle High School
- Kyrle disease
- John Kyrle (disambiguation)
