= Walter Norborne (died 1684) =

English landowner and politician (1655–1684)

Walter Norborne (18 November 1655 – September 1684) was an English landowner and politician, who sat in the House of Commons in 1679 and from 1681 to 1684. He was killed in a duel at the age of 28.

== Early life ==
Norborne was the son of Walter Norborne of Hilmarton, near Calne in Wiltshire, and his wife Mary Chivers, daughter of Henry Chivers of Quemerford and his wife Elizabeth Seacole of Milton, Oxfordshire. His father was a Royalist MP for Calne.

== Career and death ==
In February 1679, Norborne was elected Member of Parliament for Calne and sat until August 1679. In 1681 he was re-elected MP for Calne and sat until his death in 1684.

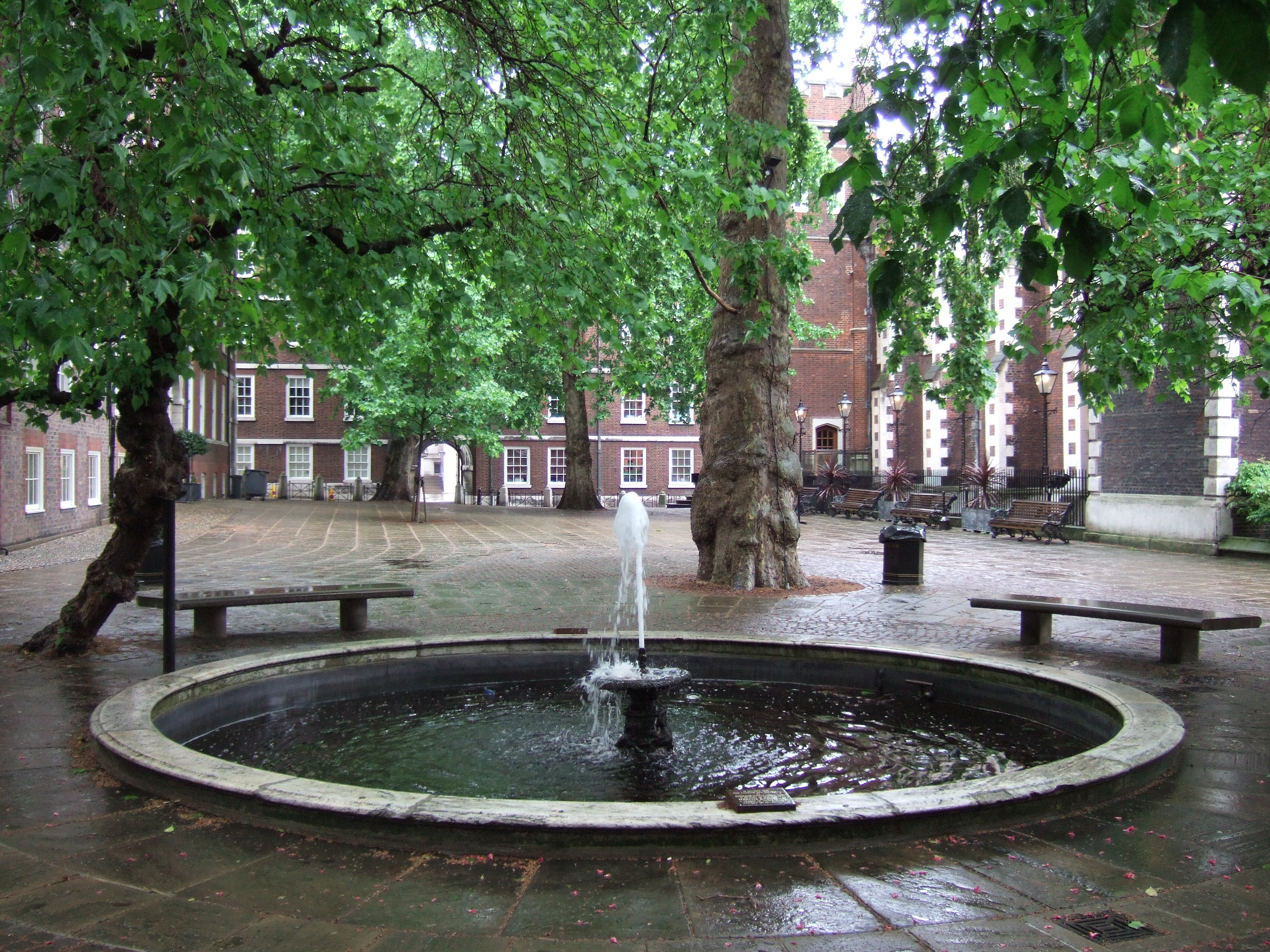
Fountain Court, at the heart of Middle Temple

Norborne was killed in a duel with an Irishman at the fountain at Middle Temple in September 1684.

== Personal life ==
Norborne married Frances Bacon, daughter of Sir Edmund Bacon and his wife Elizabeth Crane. He left two daughters: Elizabeth, who married Edward Devereux, Viscount Hereford; and Susan, who married Sir Ralph Hare. The family estate was divided equally between them.

Parliament of England
Preceded by George Lowe; William Duckett	Member of Parliament for Calne; 1679; With: Sir George Hungerford	Succeeded by Lionel Duckett; Sir George Hungerford
Preceded by Sir George Hungerford; Lionel Duckett	Member of Parliament for Calne; 1681–1684; With: Sir George Hungerford	Succeeded by Thomas Richmond Webb; Sir John Ernle
