= Richard Chamberlain (disambiguation) =

Richard Chamberlain (1934–2025) was an American actor and singer.

Richard Chamberlain may also refer to:

- Richard Chamberlain (MP for Calne) (fl. 1420), English politician
- Richard Chamberlain (MP for Islington West) (1840–1899), British politician

== See also ==
- Richard Chamberlin (disambiguation)
