= John Ernle (disambiguation) =

John Ernle (1620–1697) was Chancellor of the Exchequer from 1676 to 1689.

John Ernle (or Ernley) may also refer to:

- John Ernle (Royal Navy officer) (1647–1686), naval officer of the Third Anglo-Dutch War, son of the Chancellor of the Exchequer
- John Ernley (1464–1520/5), Solicitor General, Attorney General, and Lord Chief Justice of the Court of Common Pleas
