= John Ernle (Royal Navy officer) =

Captain Sir John Ernle JP DL
- Born: 31 December 1647 (baptised)
- Died: 25 October 1686
- Burial place: Much Marcle, Herefordshire
- Education: Exeter College, Oxford
- Spouse: Vincentia Kyrle
- Children: 2
- Relatives: Sir John Ernle (father); Sir Walter Ernle (brother)
- Military career
- Allegiance: Kingdom of England
- Branch: Royal Navy
- Service years: c.1664–1686
- Rank: Captain
- Commands: HMS Dover; HMS Revenge; HMS Henry; HMS Foresight; HMS Woolwich; Lord Commissioner of the Admiralty; HMS Defiance
- Conflicts: Third Anglo-Dutch War; Battle of Solebay; Battle of Schooneveld; Battle of Texel (WIA)
- Other work: Member of Parliament for Calne

Captain Sir John Ernle JP DL (c.31 December 1647 – 25 October 1686), of Burytown, Broad Blunsdon, Wiltshire, served as a Royal Navy officer in the Third Anglo-Dutch War, and was briefly a Member of Parliament for Calne.

== Career ==
The son of Sir John Ernle, Chancellor of the Exchequer, Ernle was educated at Exeter College, Oxford, after which he became a member of Lincoln's Inn. He went on to serve in the Royal Navy, commanding ships of the line.

At the Battle of Solebay of 1672, Ernle commanded HMS Dover, and during the battle he saved Sir John Harman and the Charles from a fire ship. By the summer of 1678, he was in command of the new 64-gun ship of the line HMS Defiance. Although he lived chiefly in Herefordshire, he was elected member of Parliament for Calne in 1685, about a year before his death; the property inherited from his father included Whetham House, near Calne.

John Aubrey says of him:

Sir John Ernele, great-grandson of Sir John Ernele above sayd, and eldest son of Sir John Ernele, late Chancellour of the Exchequer, had the command of a flagship, and was eminent in some sea services.

Ernle was knighted in 1673. On 6 December 1674 he married Vincentia Kyrle, co-heir of Sir John Kyrle, 2nd Baronet, of Homme House, Much Marcle, Herefordshire. They had two children: Hester (1676–1723) and John Kyrle Ernle (1682–1725).

He died on 25 October 1686 and was buried at Much Marcle.

Parliament of England
Preceded by Walter Norborne; Sir George Hungerford	Member of Parliament for Calne; 1685–1686; With: Thomas Richmond Webb	Succeeded by Lionel Duckett; Henry Chivers
