= HMS Hope (1678) =

Ship of the line of the Royal Navy

History

England
- Name: HMS Hope
- Ordered: March 1678
- Builder: Robert Castle, Deptford yard
- Launched: 1678
- Commissioned: 31 March 1679
- Captured: 16 April 1695

General characteristics as built
- Class & type: 70-gun third rate ship of the line
- Tons burthen: 10527/94 bm
- Length: 151 ft 5 in (46.2 m) (gundeck); 121 ft 7 in (37.1 m) (keel(
- Beam: 40 ft 4 in (12.3 m)
- Depth of hold: 16 ft 9 in (5.1 m)
- Propulsion: Sails
- Sail plan: Full-rigged ship
- Complement: 460 (wartime abroad); 380 (wartime at home); 300 (peacetime)
- Armament: 70 guns of various weights of shot (reduced to 62 in peacetime)

HMS Hope was a 70-gun third rate ship of the line of the English Royal Navy, one of 20 such Third Rates ordered under the 'Thirty Ships' Progamme approved in 1677. She was built by Robert Castle launched at Castle's private yard (near Deptford Dockyard) in late 1678.

She fought in the Battle of Beachy Head (1690) and the Battle of Barfleur (1692).

Hope was captured by René Duguay-Trouin's squadron in the Channel on 16 April 1695 (coincidentally, her original sister-ship Elizabeth, although rebuilt in 1699-1704, was similarly captured by Duguay-Trouin's squadron in 1704). She was renamed Espérance d'Angleterre and served the French Navy until 1703. On 12 October 1703, as part of the fleet of François-Louis Rousselet (marquis de Châteaurenault) in Vigo Bay, she was stationed at one end of the boom created to protect the French and Spanish warships in the inner harbour of Redondela; she was captured there during the assault by the Anglo-Dutch fleet and was run ashore and burnt.
