= Old Rosie =

English cider

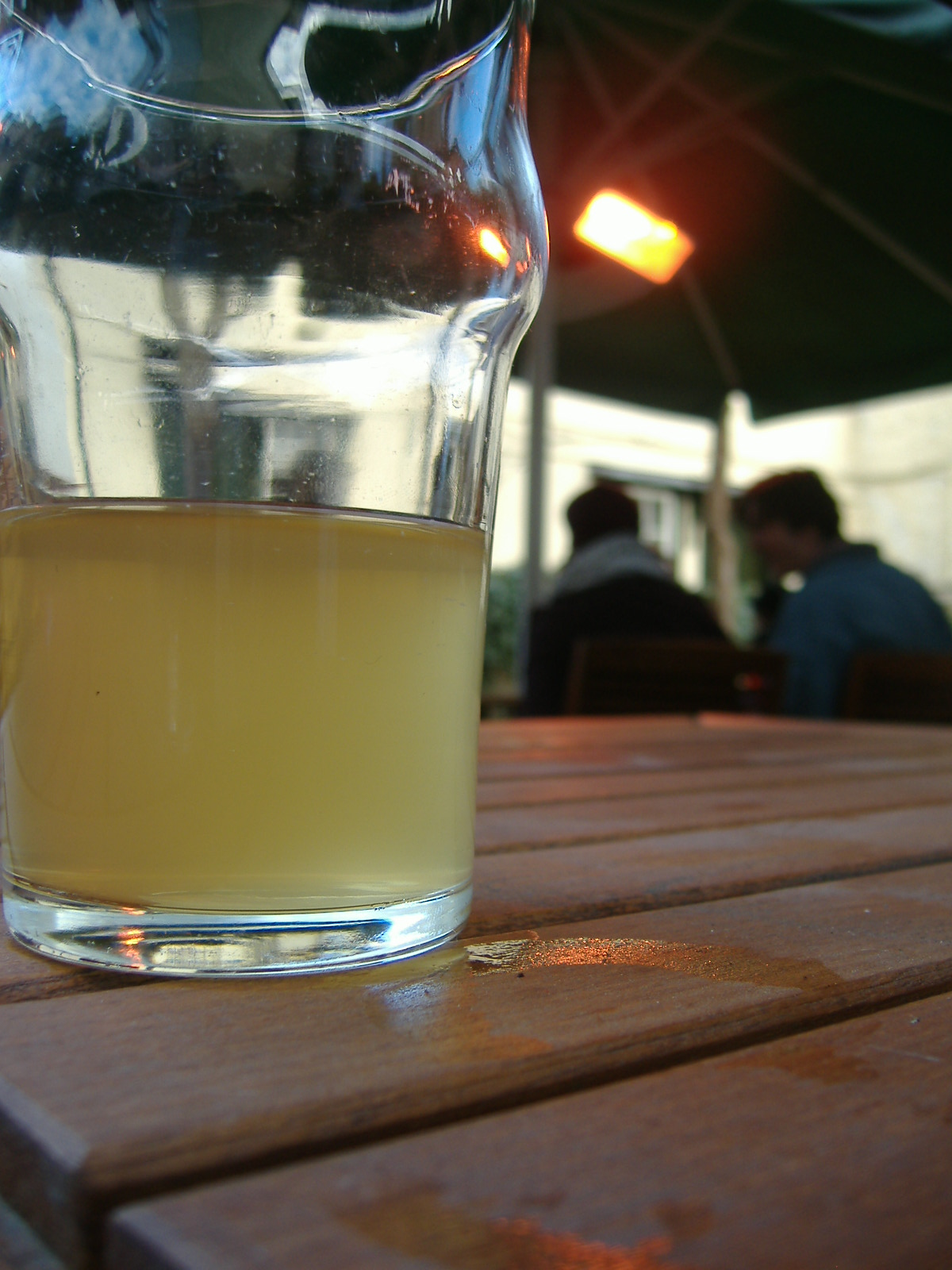
- Type: Cider
- Manufacturer: Weston's Cider
- Origin: Herefordshire, England
- Alcohol by volume: 6.8% 7.3% (before Feb 2019)
- Colour: Orange

Old Rosie is a strong cider produced by Weston's Cider of Much Marcle in Herefordshire, England.

Matured in traditional oak vats, Old Rosie is a dry, still and cloudy cider, much like a traditional scrumpy but lightly sparkling, and currently produced with an alcohol strength of 6.8% ABV, reduced from 7.3% ABV in February 2019. It is best served chilled (as stated on the back of every bottle) and can be purchased in traditionally-shaped 2 litre glass flagon, 500ml bottles, A 2.25-litre bag-in-A-box or occasionally on draught.

It is named after a 1921 Aveling and Porter steam roller that the company owns. The steam engine was called "Old Rosie" after the Laurie Lee book, Cider with Rosie.

The company was formed in 1880, in Herefordshire, a county known for growing apples and pears suitable for cider and perry. Over the years, the company have produced many different types of cider and scrumpy, including Stowford Press, Special Vintage and Old Rosie. Westons only use apples that are grown within a fifty-mile radius of their mill.
