= John Duckett (Royalist) =

English gentleman and landowner

Member of Parliament for Calne, Wiltshire

Personal details
- Born: 13 September 1581 Calstone, Wiltshire
- Died: 27 October 1648 (aged 67) Calne, Wiltshire
- Occupation: High Sheriff of Wiltshire

John Duckett (13 September 1580 – 27 October 1648) was an English gentleman and landowner who sat in the House of Commons from 1621 to 1624.

Duckett was the second son of Stephen Duckett, a Wiltshire gentleman and a member of the Company of Mercers. He matriculated at Brasenose College, Oxford, on 15 December 1592, aged 12. In 1621, he was elected Member of Parliament for the rotten borough of Calne, where elections were under his family's control; his father had been returned for the seat in 1584 and 1586. He was re-elected for Calne in 1624. He was fined for refusing a knighthood at the coronation of Charles I. In 1628 he was High Sheriff of Wiltshire.

Duckett was a Royalist colonel in the Civil War. He lived at Calstone House, near Calne, until it was destroyed by fire during the war and thereafter at another property, Hartham House, near Corsham. On one occasion he escaped the wrath of parliamentary forces by escaping from Calstone in a hearse.

== Family ==
Duckett inherited land at Gotton, Somerset, from his father and then inherited the bulk of his father's lands in Wiltshire and Dorset in 1609, on the death of his elder brother Lionel, who had not married.

He married twice. Firstly to Elizabeth Elkington, the widow of Thomas Chivers. Secondly on 6 April 1619 at Gloucester, to Jane Winter, a daughter of William Winter of Coleford, Gloucestershire. Their children were:

- William Duckett (1624–1686), the son and heir, who like his father became a member of parliament for Calne. William's descendant, George Duckett (1684–1732), was the last of his line, but his daughter Grace married George Jackson, who in 1791 was created a Baronet and took the name of Sir George Duckett, 1st Baronet.
- Stephen Duckett (1626–1626)

Duckett was buried on 27 October 1648 at Calne, at the age of 68.

Parliament of England
Preceded by Richard Lowe; John Pym	Member of Parliament for Calne; 1621–1624; With: John Prynne 1621–1622; Sir Edward Howard 1624	Succeeded by Sir Edward Howard; George Lowe
