= Norborne Berkeley =

Norborne Berkeley may refer to:

- Norborne Berkeley, 4th Baron Botetourt (c. 1717–1770), British courtier, member of parliament, and royal governor of the colony of Virginia
- Norborne Berkeley (American football) (1891–1964), American football player and director of the Bethlehem Steel Company
- Norborne Berkeley (soldier) (1824–1911), Virginia planter, politician and Confederate Army officer
