= Kyrle baronets =

Extinct baronetcy in the Baronetage of England

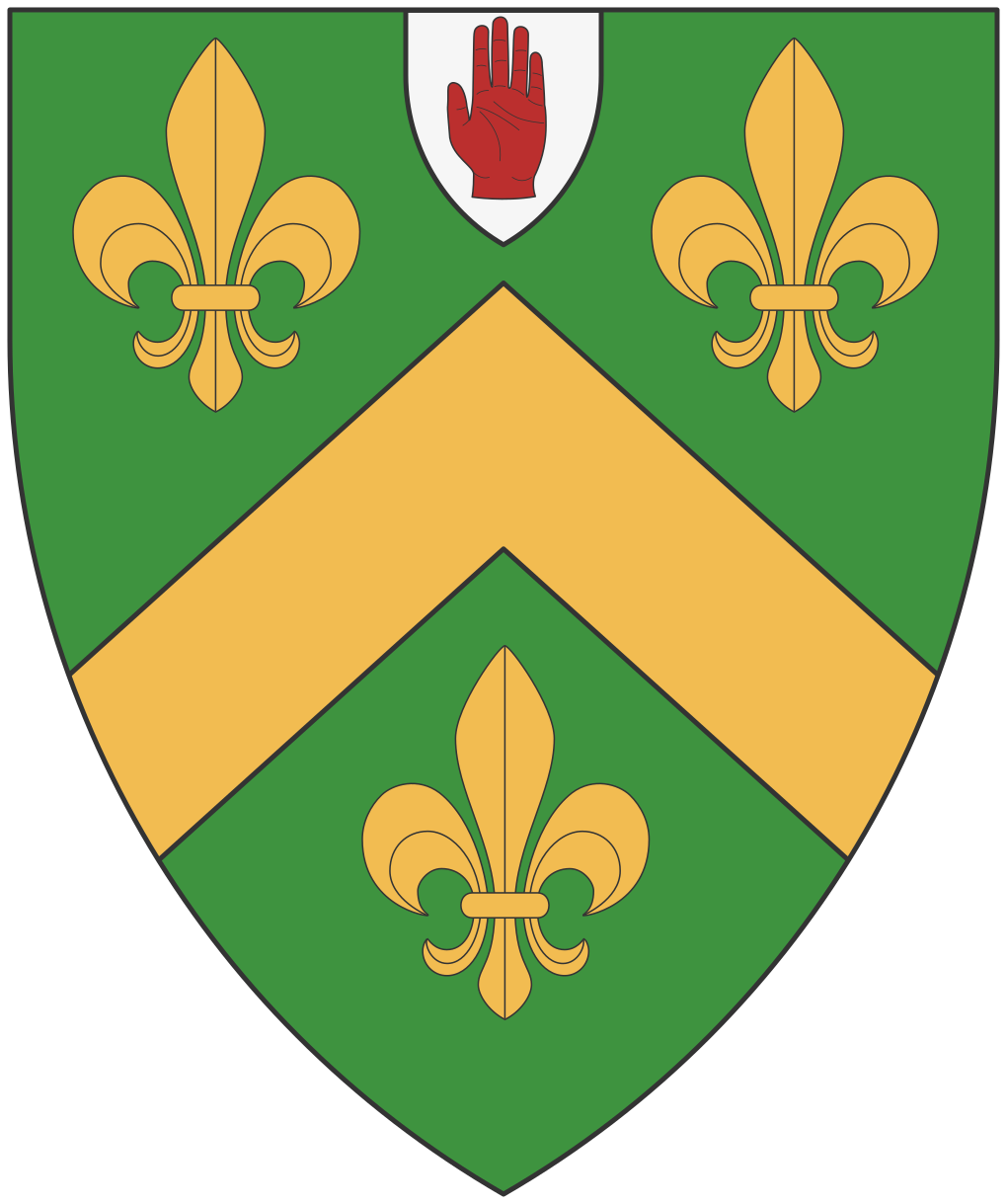
The coat of arms of Kyrle of Much Marcle, Baronets.

The Kyrle Baronetcy, of Much Marcle in the County of Hereford, was a title in the Baronetage of the United Kingdom. It was created on 12 May 1627 for John Kyrle, twice High Sheriff of Herefordshire. His grandson, the second baronet, sat as Member of Parliament for Herefordshire. The title became extinct on his death in 1680. They were seated at Homme House, Much Marcle.

Vincentia, daughter of the 2nd baronet, married in 1674 Royal Navy captain John Ernle (1647–1686), thus uniting the Kyrle estates with Ernle's estates in Wiltshire.

James Money (1775–1843), a descendant of the Kyrle Baronets, assumed the additional surname of Kyrle in 1809 and was created a baronet in 1838; he rose to the rank of Major-General in the army. His baronetcy fell extinct on his death.

== Kyrle baronets, of Much Marcle (1627) ==
- Sir John Kyrle, 1st Baronet (died 1650)
- Sir John Kyrle, 2nd Baronet (c. 1617–1680)
