= Edward Bower =

English painter

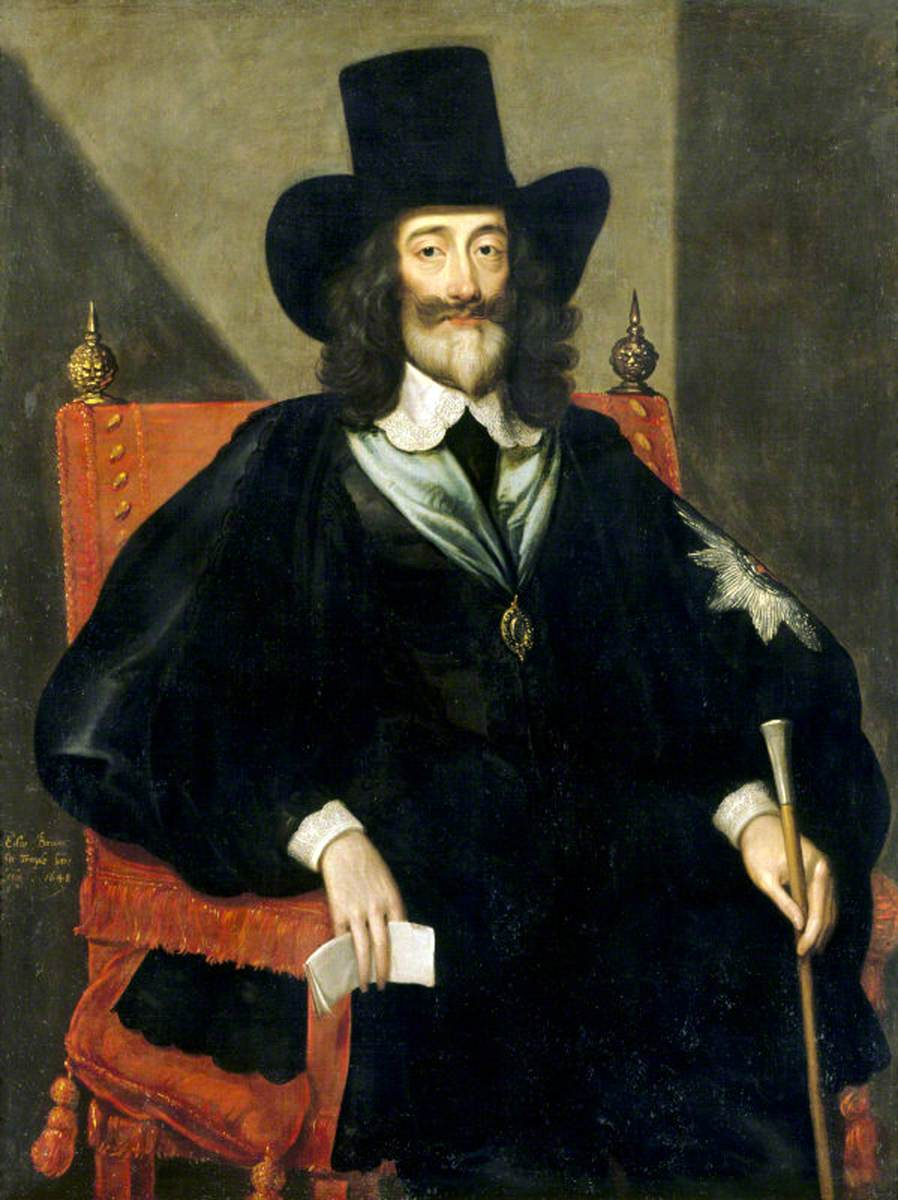
Charles I at his trial (c. 1650)

Edward Bower (fl. 1635 – 1667) was an English portrait painter. During the Civil War he worked mostly for Parliamentarian patrons, and painted Charles I at his trial. He portrayed other famous men of the time such as Lord Fairfax and John Pym. He worked primarily in London.

Some of his works were engraved by Wenceslaus Hollar.

== Notes ==
Attribution:
