= Calne (constituency) =

Former parliamentary constituency in the United Kingdom

- Former borough constituency for the House of Commons

1295–1885
- Seats: Two (1295–1832); one (1832–1885)
- Replaced by: Chippenham

Calne was a parliamentary borough in Wiltshire, which elected two Members of Parliament (MPs) to the House of Commons from 1295 until 1832, and then one member from 1832 until 1885, when the borough was abolished.

== History ==
Calne was one of the towns represented in the Model Parliament of 1295, but sent members only sporadically for the next century. However, it was continuously represented from the reign of Richard II (1377–1399). From medieval times, the borough consisted of the whole of the market town of Calne in the north-west of Wiltshire, and some of the surrounding district which was part of Calne parish. In 1831, the population of the borough was 2,640, and it contained 487 houses.

The right to vote was reserved to the corporation, which consisted of two "guild stewards", appointed annually, and a varying number of ordinary members or "burgesses", who were appointed by being co-opted by the existing members. This meant that once any interested party had secured control of the corporation it was generally easy to maintain, and the owner or "patron" of the borough usually had total power to nominate both the MPs. Indeed, before 1830 there had not been a contested election in living memory.

Calne manor was bought in 1572 by Lionel Duckett, a London mercer, and his family were influential over elections in the borough for almost 200 years. By the mid 18th century, the patronage was shared between Thomas Duckett and William Northey, who generally used it to return themselves as MPs, although it could also be a source of revenue: in 1757 Duckett was paid a government pension of £500 a year to vacate his seat when Pitt the Elder wanted it for George Hay.

Between 1763 and 1765, the Earl of Shelburne (who later became Marquess of Lansdowne) bought out Duckett and Northey, and his family controlled the borough in the Whig interest for about the next 75 years. Nevertheless, the power of the corporation and the Lansdowne influence was apparently much resented. In 1807 the corporation insisted on re-electing an MP with whom they were satisfied, Joseph Jekyll, even though Lansdowne wanted to replace him. At the general election of 1826, the inhabitants attempted a revolt against Lansdowne's domination, trying to win over some of the corporation members, but the issue was not taken as far as contesting the election. At the next opportunity, however, the 1830 general election, the townsmen put up their own candidates – one of several such rebellions against local aristocratic domination which took place in boroughs across the country at that election. All 18 members of the corporation voted for the Lansdowne candidates, but 60 of the local householders attempted to vote for their nominees, and when their votes were rejected by the returning officers they petitioned to have the election overturned. However, the Commons upheld the existing franchise and confirmed the result of the election.

In the initial version of the Reform Bill as proposed to Parliament in 1830, Calne would have kept both of its MPs. This was apparently because of a misunderstanding of how the 1821 census returns had been compiled, which made Calne seem much larger than it was. In fact, other boroughs of a similar size to Calne were to lose a seat, and as Lansdowne was a member of the cabinet it was politically impossible to let Calne benefit from any anomalies. Calne became one of the causes celebres round which debate on the Bill revolved, but the government eventually transferred it to Schedule B, the list of boroughs that were to lose a seat.

Under the Great Reform Act as it was eventually passed in 1832, Calne kept one of its two seats, its boundaries being extended to bring in the whole of Calne parish and parts of the neighbouring Calstone Wellington and Blackland parishes. This increased the population to 4,795; the franchise was reformed as elsewhere, and there were 191 residents qualified to vote in the first post-Reform election. This extension of the electorate could not free the borough from the Lansdowne influence, however, and the MP was a member of the Marquess's family for all but 13 of the borough's remaining 53 years of existence.

Calne was eventually abolished as a constituency with effect from the general election of 1885, the area being included from that point in the Chippenham (or Wiltshire North West) county division.

== Members of Parliament ==
=== 1295–1640 ===
Parliament	First member	Second member
1388 (Feb)	William Wichampton	Ricard Roude
1399	Robert Salman	John Felawe
1413 (May)	Robert Salman	Robert Roude
1414 (Apr)	Robert Salman	Robert Roude
1414 (Nov)	Robert Salman	Robert Roude
1415	William Clerk	John Blake
1416 (Mar)		
1416 (Oct)		
1417	Robert Long	Robert Salman
1419		
1420	John Bailey	Richard Chamberlain
1421 (May)	Robert Blake	Walter Studley
1421 (Dec)	John Justice	Robert Green
1472	Roger Townshend	
1510–1523	No names known	
1529	William Crowche	John Turgeys
1536	?	
1539	?	
1542	?	
1545	Robert Long	Francis Goodere
1547	Griffin Curteys	John Cock
1553 (Mar)	?	
1553 (Oct)	Robert Hungerford	William Allen
1554 (Apr)	William Baseley	William Allen
1554 (Nov)	Sir John Marvyn	Edward Wastfield
1555	William Allen	Edward Wastfield
1558	William Allen	Richard Nicholas
1559	Andrew Baynton	Richard Kingsmill
1562–1563	William Clerke	William Allen
1571	Edward Chambers	Richard Danvers
1572	William Allen, died and replaced Nov 1575 by Sir Edward Baynton	William Weare alias Browne
1584	Stephen Duckett	John Lever
1586	Stephen Duckett	John Lever
1588	Henry Jackman	John Lever
1593	Henry Jackman	Thomas Edwards
1597	Thomas Edwards	Richard Lowe
1601	Lionel Duckett	Richard Lowe
1604	William Swaddon	John Noyes
1606–1611	Sir Edmund Carey	John Noyes
1614–?	Sir Edmund Carey	Richard Lowe
1621–1622	John Duckett	John Pym
1624	John Duckett	Sir Edward Howard
1625	George Lowe	Sir Edward Howard
1626	George Lowe	Sir John Eyres
1628–1629	George Lowe	Sir John Maynard
1629–1640	No Parliaments summoned	

=== 1640–1832 ===
Year	First member	First party	Second member	Second party
April 1640	William Maynard		Walter Norborne	
November 1640	George Lowe	Royalist	Hugh Rogers	Parliamentarian
February 1644	Lowe disabled from sitting – seat vacant		Hugh Rogers	Parliamentarian
1645	Rowland Wilson		Hugh Rogers	Parliamentarian
February 1650	Wilson died – seat vacant		Hugh Rogers	Parliamentarian
1653	Calne was unrepresented in the Barebones Parliament and the First and Second Parliaments of the Protectorate			
January 1659	Edward Bayntun		William Duckett	
May 1659	Not represented in the restored Rump			
April 1660	Edward Bayntun		William Duckett	
1661	George Lowe		William Duckett	
February 1679	Sir George Hungerford		Walter Norborne	
August 1679	Sir George Hungerford		Lionel Duckett	
1681	Sir George Hungerford		Walter Norborne	
1685	Sir John Ernle		Thomas Richmond Webb	
1689	Henry Chivers		Lionel Duckett	
1690	Henry Chivers		Henry Bayntun	
1691	Henry Chivers		William Wyndham	
1695	Henry Blaake		George Hungerford	
1698	Henry Blaake		Henry Chivers	
January 1701	Walter Long		Walter Hungerford	
November 1701	Henry Blaake		Edward Bayntun	
March 1702	Henry Blaake		Henry Chivers	
July 1702	Sir Charles Hedges		Henry Chivers	
1705	Edward Bayntun		George Duckett	Whig
1710	James Johnston		William Hedges	
1713	William Northey		William Hedges	
1715	Sir Orlando Bridgeman, Bt	Whig	Richard Chiswell	
1722	Benjamin Haskins-Stiles		George Duckett	Whig
February 1723	Edmund Pike Heath		George Duckett	Whig
February 1723	Edmund Pike Heath		Matthew Ducie Moreton	
1727	William Duckett		William Wardour	
1734	William Duckett		Walter Hungerford	
1741	William Elliot	Whig	Walter Hungerford	
1747	William Elliot	Whig	William Northey	
1754	Thomas Duckett		William Northey	
1757	George Hay		William Northey	
1761	Thomas Duckett		Daniel Bull	
1762	Thomas Duckett		Hon. Thomas FitzMaurice	
1766	John Calcraft		Hon. Thomas FitzMaurice	
1768	John Dunning	Whig	Hon. Thomas FitzMaurice	
1774	John Dunning	Whig	Isaac Barré	Whig
1782	James Townsend	Whig	Isaac Barré	Whig
1787	Joseph Jekyll	Whig	Isaac Barré	Whig
1790	Joseph Jekyll	Whig	John Morris	Whig
1792	Joseph Jekyll	Whig	Benjamin Vaughan	
1796	Joseph Jekyll	Whig	Sir Francis Baring, Bt	Whig
1802	Joseph Jekyll	Whig	Lord Henry Petty	Whig
1806	Joseph Jekyll	Whig	Osborne Markham	Whig
1807	Joseph Jekyll	Whig	Henry Smith	Whig
1812	Joseph Jekyll	Whig	Hon. James Abercromby	Whig
1816	Sir James Macdonald, Bt	Whig	Hon. James Abercromby	Whig
1830	Sir James Macdonald, Bt	Whig	Thomas Babington Macaulay	Whig
1831	Charles Richard Fox	Whig	Thomas Babington Macaulay	Whig
1832	Representation reduced to one member			

=== 1832–1885 ===
Election	Member	Party
1832	William Petty-FitzMaurice, Earl of Kerry	Whig
1836 by-election	Hon. John Fox-Strangways	Whig
1837	Henry Petty-FitzMaurice, Earl of Shelburne	Whig
1856 by-election	Sir Fenwick Williams	Whig
1859	Robert Lowe	Liberal
1868	Lord Edmond FitzMaurice	Liberal
1885	Constituency abolished	

== Election results ==
=== Elections in the 1830s ===
General election 1830: Calne
Party	Candidate	Votes	%	±%
Whig	James Macdonald	18	11.5	
Whig	Thomas Babington Macaulay	18	11.5	
Independent	Edmund Hopkinson	60	38.5	
Independent	Edward Cheney	60	38.5	
Turnout		78		
Majority		−42	−26.9	
Whig hold				
Whig hold				

In the 1830 election, 60 ineligible householders placed votes for Hopkinson and Cheney each. These were rejected after polling.

Macdonald was reappointed Commissioner for the Affairs of India, requiring a by-election.

By-election, 10 December 1830: Calne
Party	Candidate	Votes	%	±%
Whig	James Macdonald	Unopposed		
Whig hold				

General election 1831: Calne
Party	Candidate	Votes	%	±%
Whig	Thomas Babington Macaulay	Unopposed		
Whig	Charles Richard Fox	Unopposed		
Whig hold				
Whig hold				

Macaulay was appointed a Commissioner of the India Board, requiring a by-election.

By-election, 13 June 1832: Calne
Party	Candidate	Votes	%	±%
Whig	Thomas Babington Macaulay	Unopposed		
Whig hold				

General election 1832: Calne
Party	Candidate	Votes	%	±%
Whig	William Petty-FitzMaurice	Unopposed		
Registered electors		191		
Whig hold				

General election 1835: Calne
Party	Candidate	Votes	%	±%
Whig	William Petty-FitzMaurice	Unopposed		
Registered electors		184		
Whig hold				

Petty-FitzMaurice's death caused a by-election.

By-election, 28 September 1836: Calne
Party	Candidate	Votes	%	±%
Whig	John Fox-Strangways	Unopposed		
Whig hold				

General election 1837: Calne
Party	Candidate	Votes	%	±%
Whig	Henry Petty-Fitzmaurice	Unopposed		
Registered electors		186		
Whig hold				

=== Elections in the 1840s ===
General election 1841: Calne
Party	Candidate	Votes	%	±%
Whig	Henry Petty-Fitzmaurice	Unopposed		
Registered electors		176		
Whig hold				

General election 1847: Calne
Party	Candidate	Votes	%	±%
Whig	Henry Petty-Fitzmaurice	Unopposed		
Registered electors		154		
Whig hold				

Petty-Fitzmaurice was appointed a Lord Commissioner of the Treasury, requiring a by-election.

By-election, 27 December 1847: Calne
Party	Candidate	Votes	%	±%
Whig	Henry Petty-Fitzmaurice	Unopposed		
Whig hold				

=== Elections in the 1850s ===
General election 1852: Calne
Party	Candidate	Votes	%	±%
Whig	Henry Petty-Fitzmaurice	Unopposed		
Registered electors		160		
Whig hold				

Petty-Fitzmaurice resigned, causing a by-election.

By-election, 9 July 1856: Calne
Party	Candidate	Votes	%	±%
Whig	Fenwick Williams	Unopposed		
Whig hold				

General election 1857: Calne
Party	Candidate	Votes	%	±%
Whig	Fenwick Williams	Unopposed		
Registered electors		164		
Whig hold				

General election 1859: Calne
Party	Candidate	Votes	%	±%
Liberal	Robert Lowe	103	74.6	N/A
Conservative	Thomas Large Henley	35	25.4	New
Majority		68	49.2	N/A
Turnout		138	79.3	N/A
Registered electors		174		
Liberal hold				

Lowe was appointed Vice-President of the Committee of the Council on Education, requiring a by-election.

By-election, 27 June 1859: Calne
Party	Candidate	Votes	%	±%
Liberal	Robert Lowe	Unopposed		
Liberal hold				

=== Elections in the 1860s ===
General election 1865: Calne
Party	Candidate	Votes	%	±%
Liberal	Robert Lowe	Unopposed		
Registered electors		174		
Liberal hold				

General election 1868: Calne
Party	Candidate	Votes	%	±%
Liberal	Edmond Fitzmaurice	Unopposed		
Registered electors		590		
Liberal hold				

=== Elections in the 1870s ===
General election 1874: Calne
Party	Candidate	Votes	%	±%
Liberal	Edmond Fitzmaurice	Unopposed		
Registered electors		687		
Liberal hold				

=== Elections in the 1880s ===
General election 1880: Calne
Party	Candidate	Votes	%	±%
Liberal	Edmond Fitzmaurice	518	81.7	N/A
Conservative	Ulick Ralph Burke	116	18.3	New
Majority		402	63.4	N/A
Turnout		634	79.7	N/A
Registered electors		795		
Liberal hold		Swing	N/A	
