= Stuart-Menteth baronets =

Baronetcy in the Baronetage of the United Kingdom

Arms of Stuart-Menteth baronets: Quarterly, 1st & 4th: Or a bend chequy argent and sable; 2nd & 3rd: Azure, three buckles or, all within a bordure gules

The Stuart-Menteth Baronetcy, of Closeburn in the County of Dumfries and Mansfield in the County of Ayr, is a title in the Baronetage of the United Kingdom. It was created on 11 August 1838 for Charles Stuart-Menteth. The third baronet was a naturalised American. Current family James William Francis Stuart-Menteth, Abigail Jane Stuart-Menteth (1975–2021), Audrey Plum Stuart-Menteth, Martha Isabelle Francis Stuart-Menteth

The Menteths descend from ancient Earls or Mormaers of Menteith, and more specifically from the marriage in 1260 of Mary, Countess of Menteth with Walter Bailloch Stewart, son of Walter Stewart, 3rd High Steward of Scotland. The Stuart name was not adopted until 1770, when the first baronet's father, Rev. James Menteth, adopted the name and arms from his cousin Charles Stuart in order to inherit his estates.

== Stuart-Menteth baronets, of Closeburn and Mansfield (1838) ==
- Sir Charles Granvill Stuart-Menteth, 1st Baronet (1769–1847)
- Sir James Stuart-Menteth, 2nd Baronet (1792–1870)
- Sir James Stuart-Menteth, 3rd Baronet (1841–1918)
- Sir James Frederick Stuart-Menteth, 4th Baronet (1846–1926)
- Sir William Frederick Stuart-Menteth, 5th Baronet (1874–1952)
- Sir James Wallace Stuart-Menteth, 6th Baronet (1922–2008)
- Sir Charles Greaves Stuart-Menteth, 7th Baronet (born 1950)

The heir presumptive is the present holder's brother William Jeremy Stuart-Menteth (born 1952). His heir apparent is his son James William Stuart-Menteth (born 1987).

== See also ==
- Clan Stewart
- Earl of Menteith

Baronetage of the United Kingdom
Preceded by Worsley baronets	Stuart-Menteth baronets of Closeburn; 11 August 1838	Succeeded by Kyrle-Money baronets
