= William Castle (shipbuilder) =

English shipbuilder

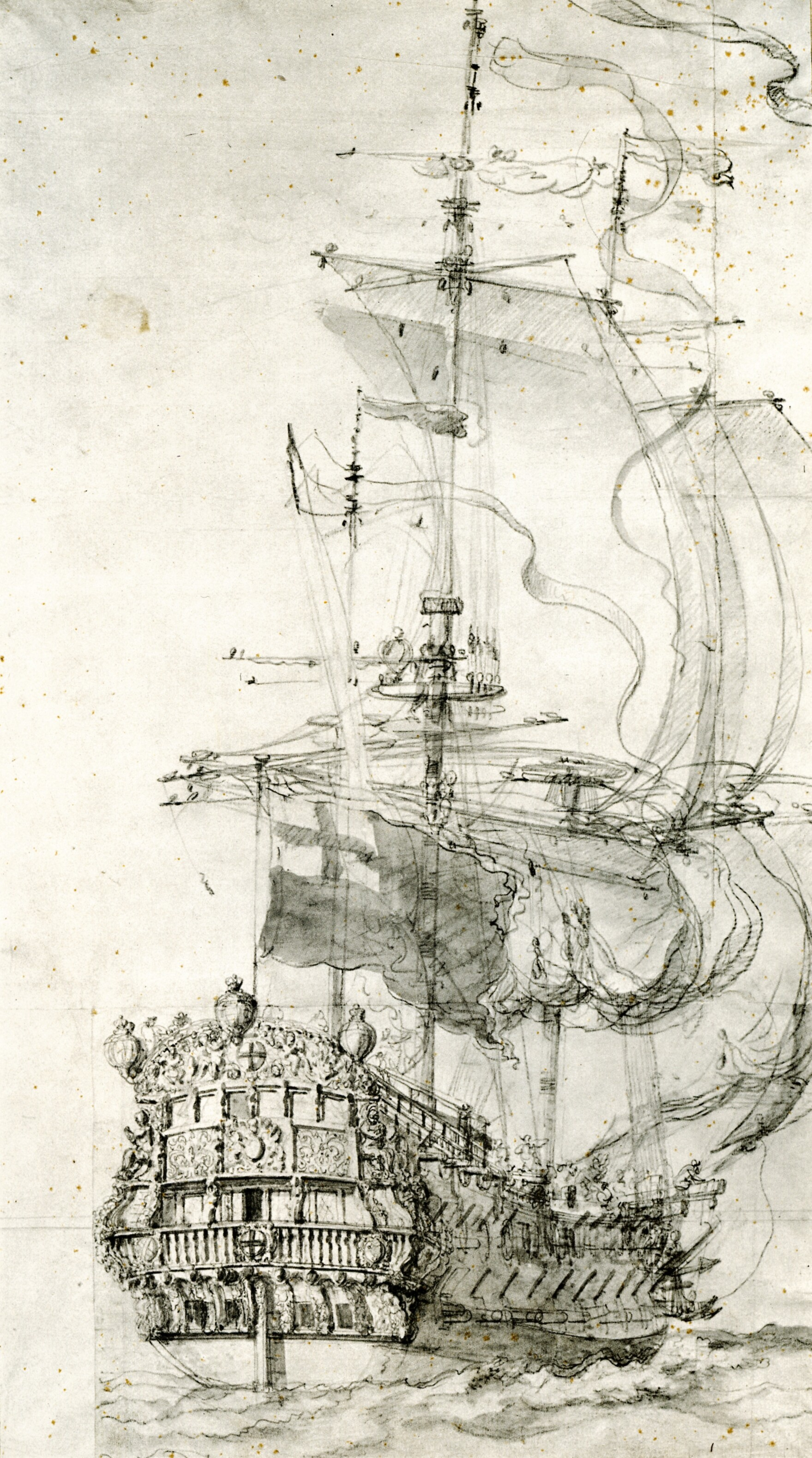
HMS Mordaunt

William Castle or Castell of Rotherhithe (c.1615–1681) was a shipbuilder for the Royal Navy and occasionally for the East India Company. He is mentioned more than once in the Diary of Samuel Pepys.

== Life ==
He was the son of William Castle (d.1649) shipwright at Redriff (now known as Rotherhithe) and his wife Margaret (d.1635). His younger brother Thomas was also a shipwright. He entered the Royal Navy in 1629 as a ship's carpenter.

Samuel Pepys first mentions Castle in 1664, commenting on the appearance of his wife.

He is buried with his parents in the floor of Bermondsey Parish Church.

== Family ==
In 1636 he married Elizabeth. On 5 July 1663 he married (as a second wife) Martha Batten, daughter of Sir William Batten, Surveyor of the Navy.

He had three sons. His son Robert was involved in the running of the Deptford yard, and subsequently took over the business. William's second son, also named William Castle, was similarly involved as a shipbuilder and died in 1696. A younger son, John Castle, died in 1700.

== Ships of note ==
- Taunton 40-gun ship launched at Rotherhithe renamed HMS Crown in 1660
- English ship Dover (1654) a 40-gun ship of the line launched at Shoreham
- HMS Monmouth (1666) an 8-gun yacht launched at Rotherhithe
- HMS Navy (1666) an 8-gun yacht launched at Rotherhithe
- HMS Defiance (1666) a 64-gun ship of the line launched at Deptford Dockyard destroyed in a fire 1668
- "Bombay Merchant" (1668) for the East India Company launched on the Thames
- HMS Kitchen (1670) 8-gun yacht launched at Rotherhithe
- HMS Hope (1678) 70-gun ship of the line launched at Deptford Dockyard
- HMS Elizabeth (1679) 70-gun ship of the line launched at Barnard's Yard at Deptford Green on the Thames

== Ships by William Castle the Younger ==
- HMS Mordaunt (1682) 48-gun ship of the line launched at Deptford, started by father, completed by the son
- HMS Griffin (1690) 28-gun ship launched at Rotherhithe
- HMS Hart (1691) 10-gun ketch launched at Rotherhithe
