= John Pym =

English politician (1584–1643)

John Pym MP JP
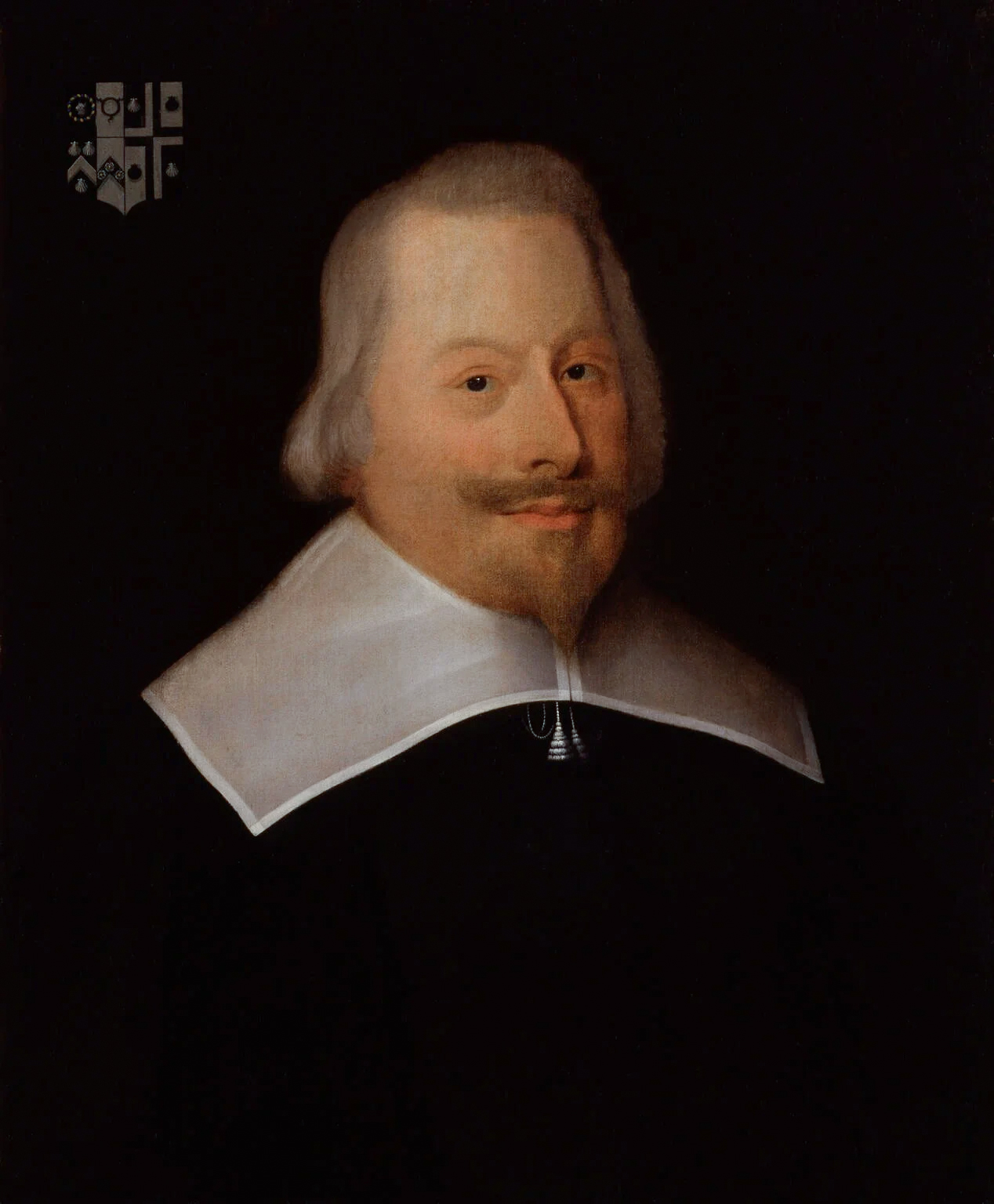
- Portrait by Edward Bower, c. 1640

Committee of Safety
- In office July 1642 – December 1643

Member of Parliament for Tavistock
- In office 1624 – 8 December 1643

Member of Parliament for Calne
- In office 1621–1622

Receiver-General Exchequer, Glos., Hants and Wilts.
- In office 1606–1639

Personal details
- Born: 20 May 1584 London, England
- Died: 8 December 1643 (aged 59) London, England
- Cause of death: Cancer
- Resting place: Westminster Abbey (initially); St Margaret's (now)
- Spouse: Anne Hooker or Hooke (1604–1620)
- Children: 7, including Charles
- Parent(s): Alexander Pym (1547–1585); Philippa Colles
- Relatives: Francis Rous (stepbrother); Anthony Nicholl (nephew)
- Education: Pembroke College, Oxford
- Occupation: Lawyer, politician and businessman
- Movement: Parliamentarians

John Pym (20 May 1584 – 8 December 1643) was an English politician, commonly credited with helping establish the modern English Parliamentary system. A key leader of the opposition to Charles I of England prior to the First English Civil War, his use of procedure to outmanoeuvre opponents was unusual for the period. Although he was respected by contemporaries rather than admired, in 1895 historian Goldwin Smith described him as "the greatest member of Parliament that ever lived".

Pym was raised by his stepfather Sir Anthony Rous, from whom he inherited his Puritan views and deep opposition to Archbishop Laud's reforms. He was also a leading member of the Providence Island Company, which attempted to establish a Puritan colony in Central America.

Pym helped organise political opposition to the Personal Rule of Charles I from 1629 to 1640. His leadership in the early stages of the war was essential to the Parliamentarian cause, particularly his role in negotiating the Solemn League and Covenant with the Scots Covenanters; his death from cancer in December 1643 was considered a major blow.

Originally buried in Westminster Abbey, after the Stuart Restoration in 1660, his body was dumped in a pit at nearby St Margaret's, Westminster along with those of other Parliamentary leaders. Though his reputation later suffered in comparison to less complex figures like John Hampden and Viscount Falkland, he is now viewed as an astute politician and effective speaker. Many of his ideas were adopted by Patriots during the American Revolution and 19th-century American liberals.

== Personal details ==
His father, Alexander Pym (1547–1585), was a member of the minor gentry from Brymore in Somerset, and a successful lawyer in London, where John was born in 1584. Alexander died seven months later and his mother, Philippa Colles (died 1620), married a wealthy Cornish landowner, Sir Anthony Rous. A close friend and executor of Sir Francis Drake, Sir Anthony instilled in his stepson a strong dislike of Spain, a zealous Puritanism, and opposition to both the Catholic Church, and the Protestant theology of Arminianism.

The Rous were a large and close-knit family, often wedding relatives and friends. In May 1604, Pym married Anne Hooke, a daughter of Barbara Rous and John Hooke, and aunt of the scientist Robert Hooke. Before her death in 1620, they had seven children, of whom four survived into adulthood; Philippa (1604–1654), Charles (1615–1671), Dorothy (1617–1661), and Catherine.

== Career ==
Pym was educated at Pembroke College, Oxford, then known as Broadgates and famous for 'advanced Protestantism'. Since legal knowledge was considered part of an education, he subsequently attended the Middle Temple in 1602; while he does not appear to have formally graduated from either, he made a number of lifelong friends, the most important of which being William Whitaker.

In June 1605, he was appointed collector of taxes for the Exchequer in Hampshire, Gloucestershire, and Wiltshire; this gave him a broader range of connections than many contemporaries, who were often confined to family or county networks. Whitaker's father had been Member of Parliament for Westbury, Wiltshire, and in 1621, Pym was elected for the nearby seat of Calne.

=== Forced Loan and Petition of Right ===
Pym's diary shows he viewed Parliamentary legislation as a whole, not just issues of interest to himself; combined with an ability to explain them clearly, it led to his appointment to numerous committees. Since direct criticism of the king was considered treason, the only way to express opposition was by attacking his advisors, using the process of impeachment. Pym argued it was for the Commons to decide guilt or innocence, leaving the Lords only to determine the penalty; this would become significant in his future Parliamentary career.

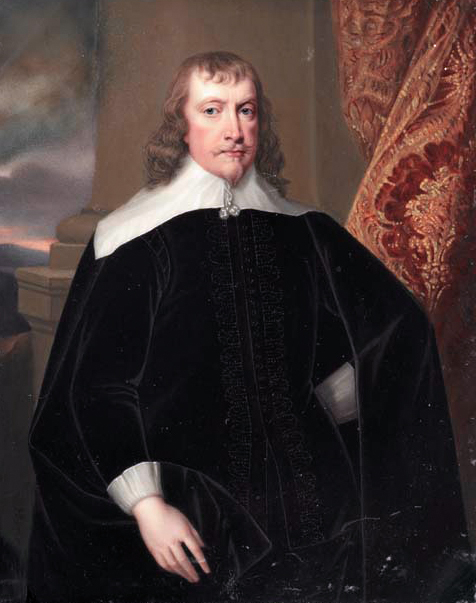
Pym's patron and political ally, the Earl of Bedford, 1587–1641

Even in an era when it was common, he was notable for his anti-Catholicism, and opposition to alleged Catholic practices in the Church of England. One reason for this was the close links in the 17th-century between religion and politics, with alterations in one viewed as implying alterations in the other. Many contemporaries fought in the Thirty Years' War and were concerned at the apparent failure of James to defend Frederick the elector of Palatine, his own son-in-law, and so Protestant Europe as a whole.

Following the dissolution of Parliament in 1621, Pym was arrested, and brought before the Privy Council, but released in August 1622. In 1624, he was elected for Tavistock, a seat controlled by Earl of Bedford, which he retained for the rest of his career. In 1626, he led an attempt to impeach the Duke of Buckingham, an action which led to Parliament being dissolved. Only Buckingham's assassination in August 1628 prevented a second attempt, while Pym supported the presentation of the Petition of Right to Charles I in 1628.

Pym, his stepbrother Francis Rous, and John Hampden, also led the Parliamentary attack on Roger Maynwaring and Robert Sibthorpe, two clergymen who published sermons supporting the Caroline precepts of the divine right of kings, and passive obedience. Though censured by Parliament for preaching against the established English constitution, Charles pardoned them, and dissolved Parliament, initiating the period of Personal Rule that continued until 1640.

Pym became treasurer of the Providence Island Company in 1630, a role that increasingly consumed his time, and he relinquished his Exchequer position in 1639. Participation in the colonial movement was common among Puritan leaders, while company meetings later provided cover for co-ordinating political opposition. Many of these became leaders of the Parliamentary opposition in 1642, among them Hampden, Rous, Henry Darley, Lord Saye, William Waller, and Lord Brooke.

=== Leader of the opposition; 1640 to 1641 ===
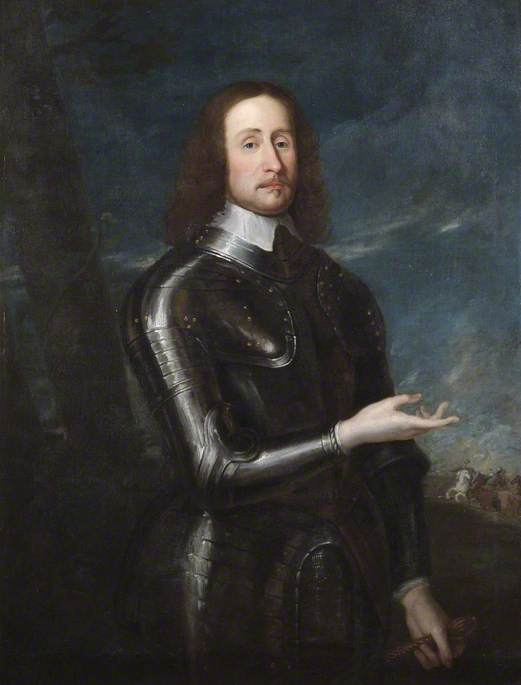
John Hampden; Pym's colleague, and one of the Five Members

Following defeat in the first of the Bishops Wars, Charles recalled Parliament in April 1640. When the Short Parliament refused to vote him taxes without political concessions, he dissolved it after only three weeks. When the Treaty of Ripon imposed by the Scots after a second defeat forced him to hold fresh elections in November, Pym became the unofficial leader of the opposition.

Historians like Tim Harris argue that, with the exception of a few extremists, by 1640 there was general consensus attempts to rule without Parliament had gone too far. This changed after the Grand Remonstrance in November 1641, when constitutional monarchists like Clarendon switched sides, arguing Parliament now wanted too much.

Where Pym differed from Clarendon, and many of his own colleagues, was recognising Charles would not keep commitments he felt had been forced from him. Even during negotiations with Parliament, he and Henrietta Maria openly told foreign ambassadors any concessions were temporary, and would be retrieved by force if needed. These suspicions increased after October 1641, when Irish Catholic rebels claimed his approval for their actions. Many believed them, given previous attempts by Charles to use Irish troops against the Scots, and his initial refusal to condemn the rebellion.

However, Pym was hampered by the fact Charles was essential to a stable government and society. Regardless of religion or political belief, in 1642 the vast majority believed a 'well-ordered' monarchy was divinely mandated; where they disagreed was what 'well-ordered' meant, and who held ultimate authority in clerical affairs. Royalists generally supported a Church of England governed by bishops, appointed by, and answerable to, the king; Parliamentarians were often more friendly to Puritanism which tended to hold that church leaders should be appointed either by their congregations or assemblies of elders.

Puritan was a term for anyone who wanted to reform, or 'purify', the Church of England, and contained many different sects. Presbyterians were the most prominent, and included leaders like Pym and John Hampden, but there were many others, such as Congregationalists, often grouped together as Independents. Close links between religion and politics added further complexity; one reason for opposition to bishops was their presence in the House of Lords, where they often blocked Parliamentary legislation. Their removal by the Clergy Act 1640 was a major step along the road to war.

Most Presbyterians were political conservatives, who believed in a limited electorate, and wanted to keep the Church of England, but as a reformed, Presbyterian body, similar to the Church of Scotland. In general, England was a structured, socially conservative, and largely peaceful society, while the devastation caused by the Thirty Years' War meant many wanted to avoid conflict at any cost. Pym was one of the few who believed only military defeat would force Charles into agreeing meaningful reforms.

=== Road to war; 1641 to 1643 ===
Shortly after the Long Parliament assembled, it was presented with the Root and Branch petition; signed by 15,000 Londoners, it demanded England follow the Scots, and expel bishops. This reflected widespread concerns about 'Catholic practices', or Arminianism in the Church of England, given weight by Charles' apparent willingness to make war on the Protestant Scots, but not assist his nephew Charles Louis regain his hereditary lands. (Note: A perspective summarised by Pym's stepbrother Francis in 1641; "For Arminianism is the span of a Papist, and if you mark it well, you shall see an Arminian reaching to a Papist, a Papist to a Jesuit, a Jesuit to the Pope, and the other to the King of Spain. And having kindled fire in our neighbours, they now seek to set on flame this kingdom also.") Many feared Charles was about to sign an alliance with Spain, a view shared by experienced diplomatic observers like Venice, and even France.

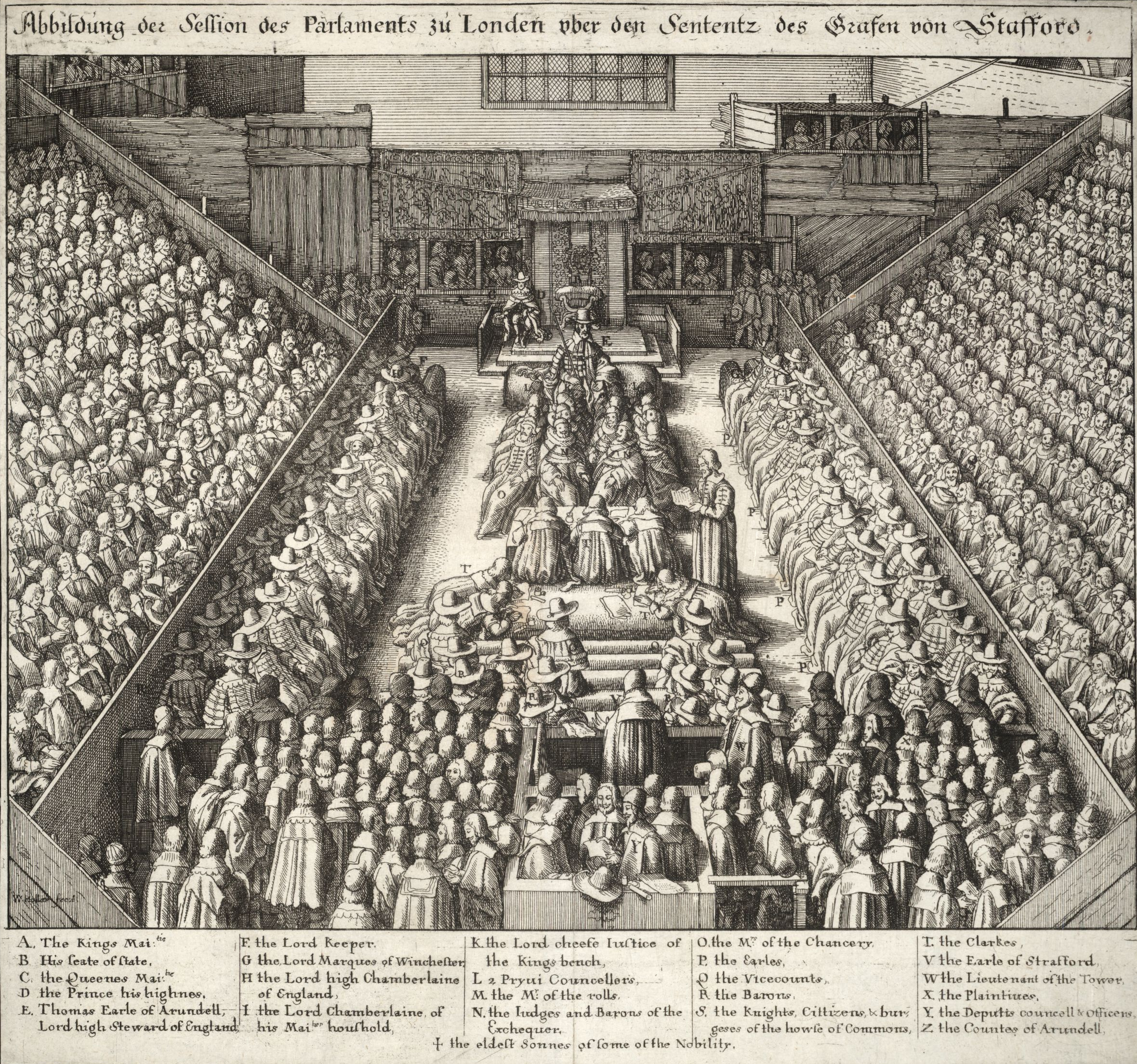
The trial of the Earl of Strafford, March 1641

This meant ending Charles' arbitrary rule was not only important for England, but the Protestant cause in general. Since respect for the institution of monarchy prevented direct attacks on Charles, the traditional route was to prosecute his 'evil counsellors.' Doing so made it clear that although the king was above the law, his subordinates were not, and he could not protect them; the intention was to make others think twice about their actions. Archbishop William Laud was impeached in December 1640 and held in the Tower of London until his execution in 1645; Strafford, former Lord Deputy of Ireland and organiser of the 1640 Bishops War, was attainted and executed in May 1641. Although it's disputed, Pym's appearance at the trial may have been the origin of the word Roundhead. According to Richard Baxter Queen Henrietta Maria at the trial of Thomas Wentworth, 1st Earl of Strafford in 1641 asking about Pym asked who the roundheaded man was.

The Commons also passed a series of constitutional reforms, including the Triennial Act 1640 (16 Cha. 1. c. 1), abolition of the Star Chamber, and an end to levying taxes without Parliament's consent. Voting as a block, the bishops ensured all these were rejected by the Lords. In June 1641, Pym secured passage of the Clergy Act in the Commons; one of its key provisions was to remove bishops from the Lords, which therefore rejected it. The growing political tension was brought to head in October with the outbreak of the Irish Rebellion. both Charles and Parliament supported raising troops to suppress it, but neither trusted the other with their control, fearing any army would be used against them first.

Pym helped draft the Grand Remonstrance, presented to Charles on 1 December 1641; unrest culminated in 23 to 29 December with widespread riots in Westminster, led by the London apprentices. Suggestions Pym and other Parliamentary leaders helped organise these have not been proved, but as a result, bishops stopped attending the Lords. On 30 December, John Williams, Archbishop of York and eleven other bishops, signed a complaint, disputing the legality of any laws passed by the Lords during their exclusion. Viewed by the Commons as inviting Charles to dissolve Parliament, all twelve were imprisoned for treason.

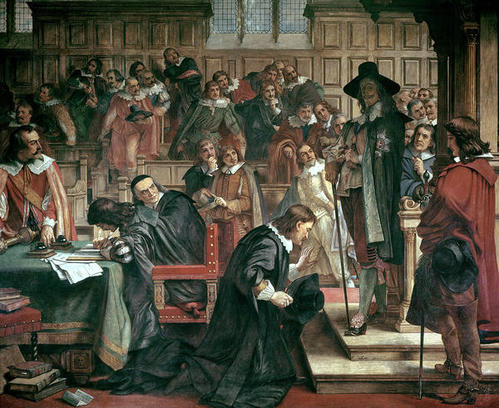
Victorian re-imagining of the arrest the Five Members, January 1642

In response to the growing unrest, on 4 January Charles made an unsuccessful attempt to arrest the Five Members, one of whom was Pym. Having failed to do so, he left London accompanied by many Royalist MPs and his supporters in the Lords, a major tactical mistake as it gave the opposition majorities in both houses. When the First English Civil War began in August, Pym headed the Committee of Safety; his reputation for integrity and ability to keep a diverse coalition of interests together was crucial to surviving the first 18 months of the conflict.

By early August 1643, a series of Royalist victories combined with the death in June of the popular John Hampden in the Battle of Chalgrove Field meant the Parliamentarian cause seemed close to collapse. At this crucial point, it was saved by Pym's leadership and determination, which led to a renewed commitment to win the war. He created the foundations of victory by ensuring Parliament had sufficient financial and military resources, one of his last acts being to negotiate the Solemn League and Covenant that secured Scottish support. Amidst the escalating tensions, one particular step Pym took played a major role in consolidating Parliament's authority. He orchestrated the expulsion of Henry Marten, a fellow Parliamentarian known for his radical views and outspoken criticism of the monarchy. Marten had publicly advocated for the deposition of King Charles I, a stance deemed too extreme by many in Parliament. Pym seized upon this opportunity to remove Marten, demonstrating his commitment to maintaining a more moderate and unified Parliamentarian front. Historian David Como believes this manoeuvre underscores Pym's political acumen and his influence within Parliament during this critical period.

He died, probably of cancer, at Derby House on 8 December 1643; Parliament agreed to pay off the debts he incurred as a result of neglecting his private business interests, although they were still being disputed in 1665. Buried in Westminster Abbey, his remains were exhumed after the Stuart Restoration in 1660 and re-buried in a common pit at St Margaret's, Westminster.

His chief opponent, the Earl of Clarendon, a senior advisor to Charles during the First English Civil War, later wrote; 'he had a very comely and grave way of expressing himself...and understood the temper and affections of the kingdom as well as any man'. Pym's reputation suffered in comparison to less complex figures like Hampden and Viscount Falkland, especially during the Victorian era which romanticised the Royalist cause. One exception was the historian Goldwin Smith, who described him as "the greatest member of Parliament that ever lived". He is now generally viewed as an astute politician who laid the foundations of modern Parliamentary democracy and effective speaker, whose ideas and language were adapted by Patriots during the American Revolution and 19th century American liberals.

== Sources ==
- Clarendon, Earl of (2019) [1704]. The History of the Rebellion and Civil Wars in England; Volume III. Wentworth Press. ISBN 978-0469445765.
- Como, David (2018). Radical Parliamentarians and the English Civil War. Oxford University Press. ISBN 9780191017704.
- Craig, John (2008), "The Growth of English Puritanism", in Coffey, John; Lim, Paul C. H. (eds.), The Cambridge Companion to Puritanism, Cambridge Companions to Religion, Cambridge University Press, pp. 34–47, ISBN 978-0-521-67800-1
- Ferris, John; Hunneyball, Paul (2010). PYM, John (1584-1643), of Westminster, Brymore, Som., Whitchurch and Wherwell, Hants; later of Holborn, Mdx. and Fawsley, Northants in The History of Parliament: the House of Commons 1604–1629. CUP. ISBN 978-1107002258.
- Harris, Tim (2014). Rebellion: Britain's First Stuart Kings, 1567-1642. OUP. ISBN 978-0199209002.
- Hutton, Ronald (2003). The Royalist War Effort 1642-1646. Routledge. ISBN 9780415305402.
- Jessup, Frank W. (2013). Background to the English Civil War: The Commonwealth and International Library: History Division. Elsevier. ISBN 9781483181073.
- Johnson, David (2012). Parliament in crisis; the disintegration of the Parliamentarian war effort during the summer of 1643 (PDF) (PHD). York University.
- Kuypers, Jim; Althouse, Mathew (2009). "John Pym, Ideographs, and the Rhetoric of Opposition to the English Crown". Rhetoric Review. 28 (3): 225–245. doi:10.1080/07350190902958677. JSTOR 25655957. S2CID 144891577.
- Little, Patrick (2008). Oliver Cromwell: New Perspectives. Palgrave Macmillan. ISBN 9781137018854.
- MacDonald, William W (1969). "John Pym: Parliamentarian". Historical Magazine of the Protestant Episcopal Church. 38 (1).
- Macleod, Donald (Autumn 2009). "The influence of Calvinism on politics" (PDF). Theology in Scotland. XVI (2).
- Manganiello, Stephen (2004). The Concise Encyclopedia of the Revolutions and Wars of England, Scotland, and Ireland, 1639–1660. Scarecrow Press. ISBN 978-0810851009.
- McGee, Sears J (2004). "Francis Rous and "scabby or itchy children": The Problem of Toleration in 1645". Huntington Library Quarterly. 67 (3): 401–422. JSTOR 10.1525/hlq.2004.67.3.401.
- Rees, John (2016). The Leveller Revolution. Verso. ISBN 978-1784783907.
- Royle, Trevor (2004). Civil War: The Wars of the Three Kingdoms 1638–1660 (2006 ed.). Abacus. ISBN 978-0-349-11564-1.
- Russell, Conrad (1990). Unrevolutionary England, 1603-1642. Bloomsbury. ISBN 9780826425669.
- Russell, Conrad (2009). "Pym, John". Oxford Dictionary of National Biography (online ed.). Oxford University Press. doi:10.1093/ref:odnb/22926. (Subscription, Wikipedia Library access or UK public library membership required.)
- Smith, Steven (1979). "Almost Revolutionaries: The London Apprentices during the Civil Wars". Huntington Library Quarterly. 42 (4): 313–328. doi:10.2307/3817210. JSTOR 3817210.
- Stanley, Arthur P (1882). Historical Memorials of Westminster Abbey. John Murray.
- Van Duinen, Jared (2007). "Prosopography and the Providence Island Company: The Nature of Puritan Opposition in 1630s England". Prosopography Approaches and Applications: A Handbook. University of Oxford. pp. 527–540. ISBN 978-1900934121.
- Wedgwood, CV (2001) [1958]. The King's War, 1641–1647. Penguin Classics. ISBN 978-0141390727.
- Wedgwood, CV (1983) [1955]. The King's Peace, 1637-1641. Penguin Classics. ISBN 978-0140069907.

Parliament of England
Preceded by Sir Edward Carey; Richard Lowe	Member of Parliament for Calne; 1621–1624; With: John Duckett	Succeeded by John Duckett; Sir Edward Howard
Preceded by (Sir) Francis Glanville; Sir Baptist Hicks, Bt	Member of Parliament for Tavistock; 1624–1629; With: Sampson Hele (1624–1625); Sir Francis Glanville (1625); Sir John Ratcliffe (1625–1626); Sir Francis Glanville (1628–1629)	Parliament suspended until 1640
Vacant Parliament suspended since 1629	Member of Parliament for Tavistock; 1640–1643; With: Lord Russell; Hon. John Russell	Succeeded by Elisha Crimes; Edward Fowell
