= Richard Chamberlin =

Richard Chamberlin may refer to:

- Richard Eliot Chamberlin (1923–1994), American mathematician
- G. Richard Chamberlin (born 1946), member of the Georgia House of Representatives

== See also ==
- Richard Chamberlain (disambiguation)
