= Weston's Cider =

English cider and perry producer

Coordinates: 51°59′42″N 2°30′48″W

H. Weston & Sons Limited
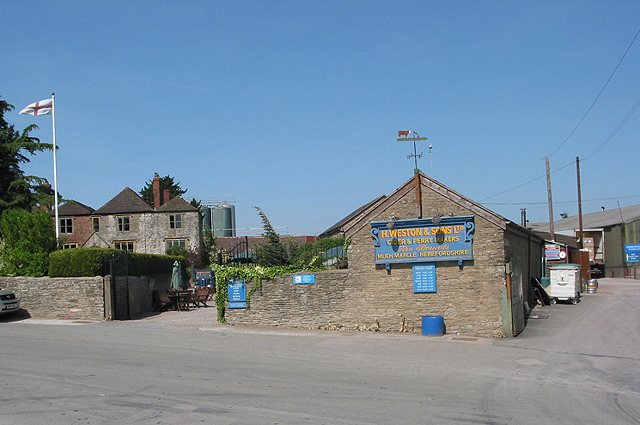
- Weston's Cider Mill, Much Marcle
- Trade name: Weston's Cider
- Industry: Alcoholic beverages
- Founded: 1880; 146 years ago
- Founder: Henry Weston
- Headquarters: Much Marcle, Herefordshire, England
- Key people: Helen Thomas (managing director)
- Number of employees: 230 (2016)

H.Weston & Sons Limited ("Weston's Cider") is a cider and perry producer based in Much Marcle, Herefordshire, England. The family-owned company, founded by Henry Weston, has been making cider in the same location since 1880 and the managing director, Helen Thomas, is a fourth generation member of the Weston family. The company had 230 staff as of 2016.

Weston's use traditional methods in their cider making process, with a large collection of oak vats.

They have their own fruit orchards which consist of 350 acres, 45 acres of which are organic trees. They also source 90% of their cider apples from growers within the Three Counties of Herefordshire, Worcestershire and Gloucestershire.

Weston's Cider make a variety of different products including perry, organic and low alcohol ciders in the premium cider sector. Their ciders are widely available, locally and nationally as well as in over 44 countries globally.

In response to the effect of the COVID-19 pandemic on pub businesses, Weston's donated 1,800 kegs of its Stowford Press cider to its customers, starting from 29 June 2020.

In November 2023, the company was fined £1.4 million after an employee suffered a fatal collision with a half open security barrier.

== Product description ==
The company has various products available in bottle, can, bag in box and keg formats, including:

- Henry Westons Vintage - Medium Dry (8.2% ABV)
- Stowford Press
- Old Rosie
- Wyld Wood Organic
- Caple Road
- Mortimer’s Orchard
- Rosie’s Pig
- Ranga Ginger Cider
- Perry

The cider mill is also a tourist attraction with daily tours, product sampling and a play park for children. There is a cider shop, tea room and restaurant, all located at The Bounds, Much Marcle, Herefordshire.
