= Much Marcle Castle =

Motte-and-bailey castle in Herefordshire, England

- Herefordshire, England
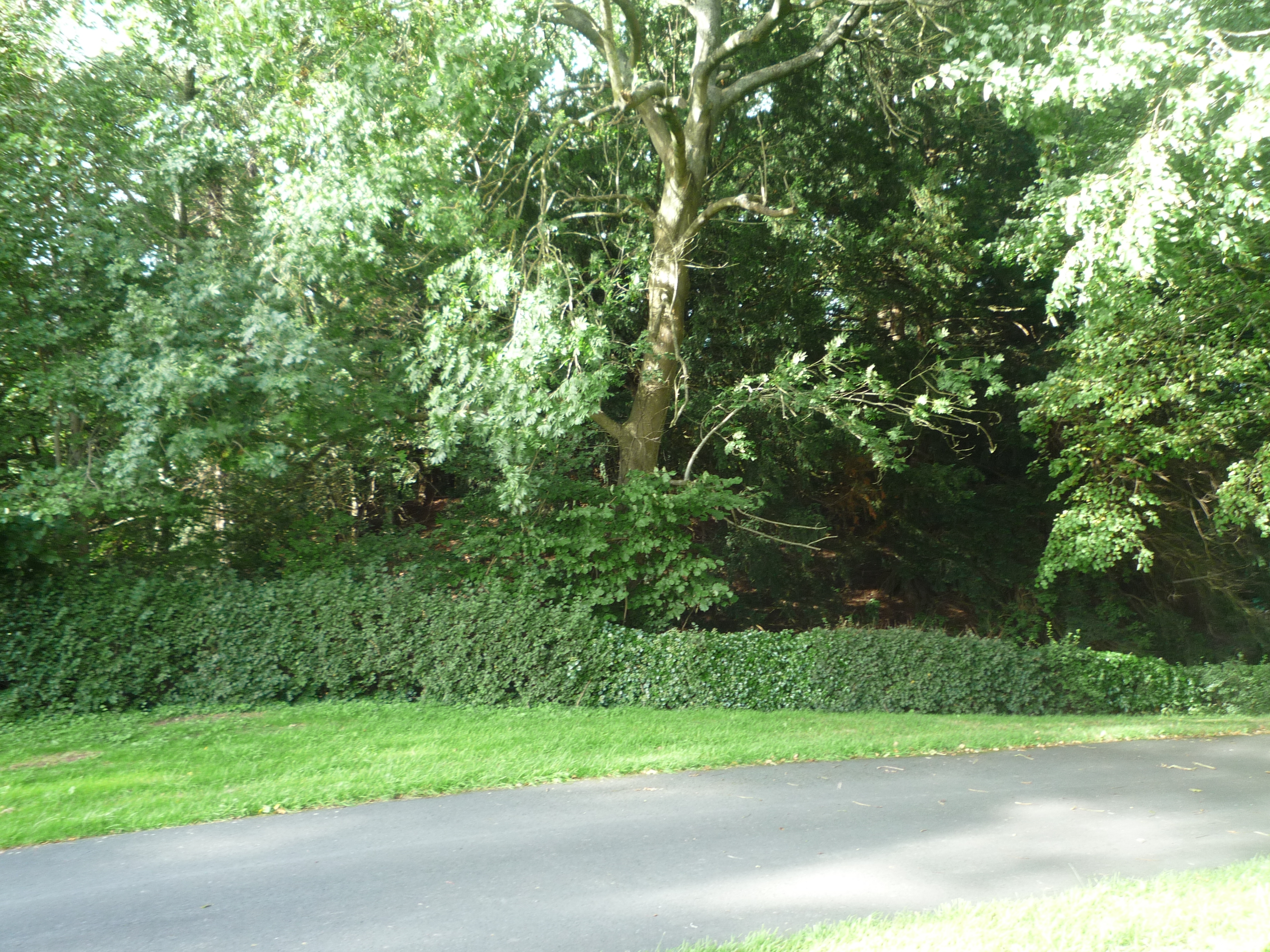
- Much Marcle Castle in 2020

Site information
- Type: Motte-and-bailey castle
- Open to the public: yes

Location
- Shown within Herefordshire
- Location within Herefordshire
- Coordinates: 51.99276°N 2.50152°W

Site history
- Built: before 1153
- Materials: Stone
- Demolished: 15th century

Much Marcle Castle, also known as Mortimer's Castle, is a motte-and-bailey castle in Much Marcle, Herefordshire which has surviving earthworks present today.

== History ==
Much Marcle Castle was present by 1153, and it was crenelated during the late 13th century.

It was abandoned in favour of the Mortimer family's nearby manorial seat at Ellingham Castle, and was demolished during the 15th century with the stones reworked into rebuilding the adjacent St Bartholomew's Church. The moat at Much Marcle Castle was still traceable as late as the early 17th century, and the inner bailey was landscaped during the 18th and 19th centuries.

Much Marcle Castle was first listed as a Scheduled Monument by Historic England on 20 March 1973.
