= Grand Remonstrance =

1641 petition of the English Parliament to Charles I

The Grand Remonstrance was a list of grievances presented to King Charles I of England by the English Parliament on 1 December 1641, but passed by the House of Commons on 22 November 1641, during the Long Parliament. It was one of the chief events which was to precipitate the English Civil War.

== Background ==
Relations between King and Parliament had been uneasy since 1625, when Charles I, King of England married the French Roman Catholic Henrietta Maria. In 1626 Charles had dissolved Parliament in order to prevent it impeaching his favourite, the influential Duke of Buckingham. Being in need of money to carry on a war with Spain as part of his strategy for intervention in the Thirty Years War, Charles resorted to means of uncertain lawfulness to raise the necessary funds, imprisoning without charge those who refused to pay. This had resulted in Parliament presenting the King with the Petition of Right in 1628, in response to which Charles had again dismissed Parliament and for the next eleven years governed without it.

In 1640, the situation had become desperate enough for Charles to summon Parliament again: faced with the Bishops' War in Scotland, he attempted to raise money for a new royal army and immediately dismissed the Parliament in May when it refused to accede. He attempted to send an army anyway, but starved of funds, the ill-equipped and poorly led English army was easily crushed by Scottish supporters of the National Covenant. Now in need of money to pay indemnities to the Scots, Charles was advised by a hastily summoned Magnum Concilium that he had no choice but to return to Parliament, which reassembled in November.

== The Grand Remonstrance ==
First proposed by John Pym, the effective leader of opposition to the King in Parliament and taken up by John Hampden and others, the Grand Remonstrance summarised all of Parliament's opposition to Charles's foreign, financial, legal and religious policies, setting forth 204 separate points of objection and calling for the expulsion of all bishops from Parliament, a purge of officials, with Parliament having a right of veto over Crown appointments, and an end to sale of land confiscated from Irish rebels. [citation needed] The document was careful not to make any direct accusation against the King himself, or any other named individual, instead blaming the state of affairs on a Roman Catholic conspiracy, made easier by the King's reconciliation with Spain and marriage to Henrietta Maria, a Roman Catholic. In tone it was strongly against the Church of Rome, taking the side of the Puritan party in the English church in opposition to William Laud, whom Charles had appointed Archbishop of Canterbury in 1633 and who, by implication, was therefore placed at the heart of the implied plot.

On 22 November 1641, following a protracted debate, the Grand Remonstrance was passed by a relatively narrow margin: 159 votes to 148. Its passage divided Parliament and drove some prominent parliamentarians such as Hyde and Falkland, who had previously been critical of the King, into the Royalist camp. At the same time, it strengthened the resolve of those who opposed what they saw as a drift toward Rome and Absolutism. Cromwell commented to Falkland that if the Grand Remonstrance had been defeated, 'I would have sold all I had the next morning and never seen England more; and I know there are many other honest men of the same resolution'.

In regard to church government, the Grand Remonstrance called for

A General Synod of the most grave, pious, learned and judicious divines of this island, assisted with some from foreign parts professing the same religion with us, who may consider all things necessary for the peace and good government of the Church.

The result was the establishment of the Westminster Assembly of Divines.

== The King's response ==
The Grand Remonstrance was delivered to King Charles I on 1 December 1641, but he long delayed giving any response to it. Parliament therefore proceeded to have the document published and publicly circulated, forcing the King's hand. On 23 December 1641, he gave his reply, refusing to remove the bishops. Charles insisted that none of his ministers were guilty of any crime so as to merit their removal and deferred any decision on Irish land until the conclusion of the war there. The king stated that he could not reconcile Parliament's view of the state of England with his own and that regarding religious affairs, in addition to affirming his opposition to Roman Catholicism, it was also necessary to protect the Church from 'many schismatics and separatists'.

The response, drafted in consultation with Hyde, was an attempt at moderation calculated to win back the support of more moderate members of Parliament. In spite of this and concessions including the arrest of William Laud, subsequent events made reconciliation impossible.

== Bibliography ==
- Leng, Thomas. "The Meanings of "Malignancy": The Language of Enmity and the Construction of the Parliamentarian Cause in the English Revolution." Journal of British Studies 53.4 (2014): 835-858.
- Purkiss, Diane. The English Civil War. New York: Basic Books, 2006. ISBN 978-0-465-06756-5, ISBN 0-465-06756-5.
- "Charles I." Encyclopædia Britannica. 2008. Encyclopædia Britannica Online. 26 February 2008 <http://www.britannica.com/eb/article-9022559>.
- British History. A Dictionary of British History. 2004 by Oxford University Press.
