= English ship Dover (1654) =

Ship of the line of the Royal Navy

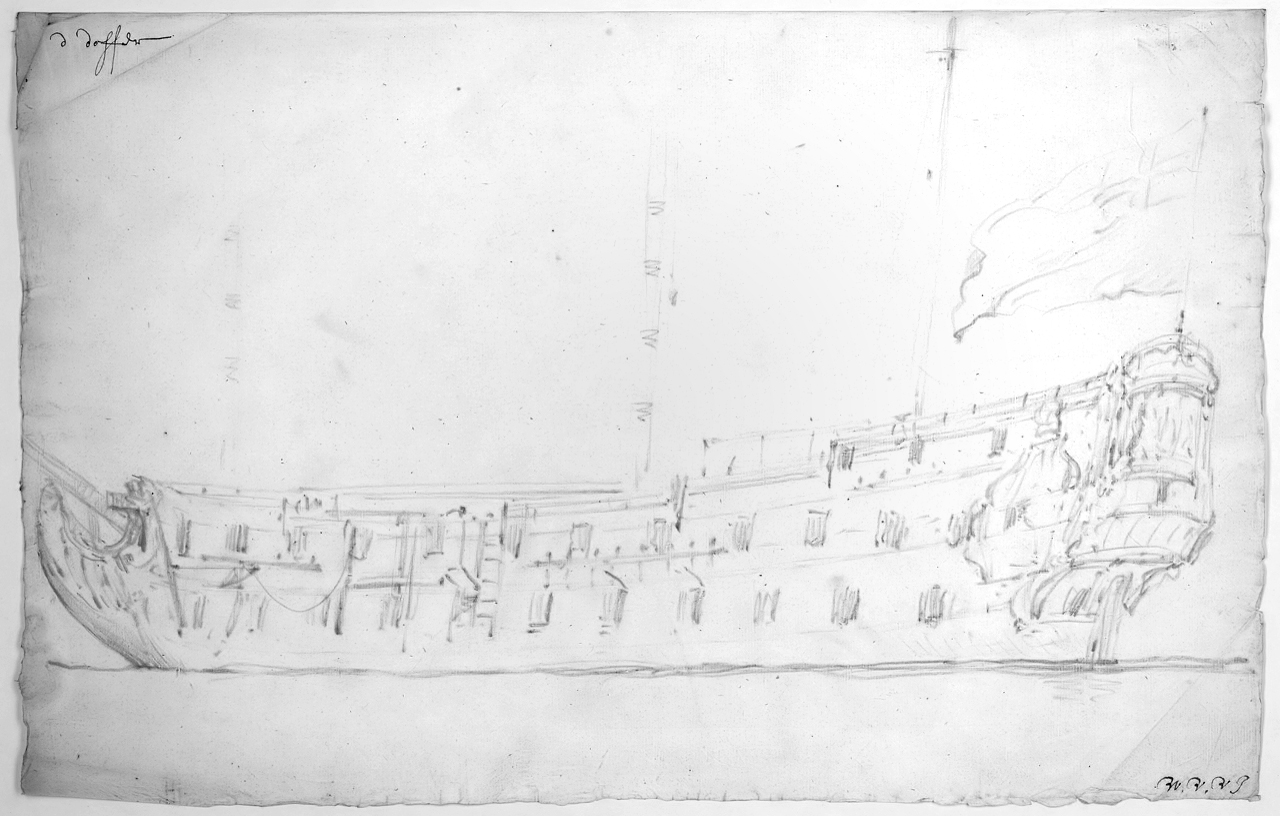
- c. 1675 illustration of Dover

History

Great Britain
- Name: HMS Dover
- Namesake: Battle of Dover (1652)
- Ordered: 27 December 1652
- Builder: William Castle, Shoreham-on-Sea
- Launched: January 1654

General characteristics as built
- Class & type: Fourth-rate frigate
- Tons burthen: 55468/94 bm
- Length: 118 ft 6 in (36.1 m) (on gundeck), 104 ft (31.7 m) (keel)
- Beam: 31 ft 8 in (9.7 m)
- Depth of hold: 12 ft 8 in (3.9 m)
- Sail plan: Full-rigged ship
- Armament: 40 guns (1660); 48 guns (1677)

General characteristics after 1695 rebuild
- Class & type: 50-gun fourth-rate ship of the line
- Tons burthen: 60417/94 bm
- Length: 118 ft 0 in (36.0 m) (on the gundeck), 98 ft 6 in (30.0 m) (keel)
- Beam: 33 ft 11.5 in (10.4 m)
- Depth of hold: 12 ft 7 in (3.8 m)
- Propulsion: Sails
- Sail plan: Full-rigged ship
- Armament: 50 guns of various weights of shot

The Dover was a 40-gun fourth-rate English frigate, originally built for the navy of the Commonwealth of England at Shoreham by William Castle, and launched in January 1654. In 1660 at the Restoration she was taken into the Royal Navy, becoming HMS Dover.

By 1665, her armament had been increased to 46 guns, comprising 22 culverins, 20 demi-culverins and 4 sakers, but in 1666 she received an additional 6 demi-culverins to give her a total of 52 guns. She took part in the Battle of Lowestoft on 3 June 1665, in the Four Days' Battle on 1–4 June 1666, and in the St James' Day Fight on 25 July 1666. At the Battle of Solebay on 28 May 1672, the Dover, commanded by John Ernle, saved Sir John Harman and the Charles from a fire ship.

The Dover was rebuilt in 1694–95 at Portsmouth Dockyard, from where she relaunched as a 48-gun fourth-rate ship of the line on 21 December 1695. She was reduced to a Fifth rate of 40 guns (by Admiralty Order of 24 May 1716) and underwent a Great Repair (but not a second rebuilding!) at Deptford Dockyard between December 1716 and July 1718. She was finally paid off at Deptford in July 1730, and taken to pieces in December.
