= John Kyrle (disambiguation) =

John Kyrle was an English philanthropist.

John Kyrle may also refer to:

- John Kyrle High School
- Sir John Kyrle, 1st Baronet (d. 1650) of the Kyrle Baronets
- Sir John Kyrle, 2nd Baronet c. 1617-1680) of the Kyrle Baronets
