= Ulick Ralph Burke =

Ulick Ralph Burke (1845–1895), Spanish scholar, eldest son of Charles Granby Burke (1814 –1898), of St. Philips, Dublin, master of the Court of Common Pleas in Ireland, by his first wife, Emma (d. 1869), daughter of Ralph Creyke of Marton, Yorkshire, was born at Dublin on 21 October 1845. Sir Thomas John Burke (1813-1875), the third baronet of Marble Hill, co. Galway, was his uncle. Ulick was educated at Trinity College, Dublin, where he graduated B.A. in 1867; he had previously been entered as a student of the Middle Temple on 28 January 1866, and he was called to the bar on 10 June 1870. A tour in Spain led him, on his return, to bring out a pleasant little volume containing an annotated collection of the proverbs that occur in Don Quixote. Thenceforth his interests were to a large extent concentrated upon the Spanish language, literature, and history. He went out to India in 1873 and practised as a barrister at the high court of the North-West Provinces till 1878. While there he put together a short biography of Gonzalo de Cordova, to which he gave the title The Great Captain: an eventful Chapter in Spanish History; this was brought out by the Society for Promoting Christian Knowledge in 1877. On his return to England Burke published two novels, Beating the Air (1879) and Loyal and Lawless (1880). In 1880 he unsuccessfully contested Calne in the conservative interest. Subsequently a journey to Brazil led to his writing, in conjunction with Robert Staples, a volume to which was given the name Business and Pleasure in Brazil, a gracefully written book which well illustrates his gift of observation. From 1885 to 1889 he was practising his profession at the bar in Cyprus. After that he acted as clerk of the peace, co. Dublin, and registrar of quarter sessions. He contributed chapter viii, that on the Early Buildings, to the tercentenary Book of Trinity College, Dublin. In 1894 he brought out a Life of Benito Juarez, Constitutional President of Mexico, and early in 1895 A History of Spain from the Earliest Times to the Death of Ferdinand the Catholic in two volumes, at which he had been working for over four years. Seccombe said the book contains some fine passages of characterisation and description, but the chapters are not well knit, together, and as a whole it scarcely does justice to the writer's knowledge of his subject. A second edition appeared in 1900 with additional notes and an introduction by Martin A. S. Hume, who also rearranged with great advantage the order of some of the sections.

In May 1895 Burke was appointed agent-general to the Peruvian Corporation. He was just setting out on a holiday in Spain, but he rapidly changed his destination and embarked for Lima upon one of the Pacific Steam Navigation Company's vessels. During the voyage he fell a victim to dysentery and died on 1 June 1895. He married, on 9 July 1868, Katherine, daughter of James Bateman, and had issue one son and two daughters.

Seccombe said Burke's quality as a Spanish scholar is best exhibited in his charming little recueil of Sancho Panza's Proverbs. This was first published in 1872, re-issued by Pickering in a limited edition with numerous corrections and improvements in 1877 as Spanish Salt, and again under the original title in 1892. He put equally good work into his notes and glossary for Borrow's Bible in Spain, which were completed by Burke's friend, Herbert W. Greene, and issued with Murray's 1899 edition of Borrow's book.
