= Alexander Pym =

English politician (c.1547–1585)

Alexander Pym (c. 1547 – 7 January 1585) was an English landowner and politician.

== Biography ==
Pym's family had been landowners at the manor of Brymore in Somerset since the thirteenth century. A lawyer, he was elected to Parliament for Taunton in November 1584, but died early the next year, leaving behind his infant son John, who would later become a prominent Parliamentarian. His widow remarried to Anthony Rous.
