= William Duckett =

William Duckett may refer to:

- William Duckett (Calne MP, died 1686) (c. 1624–1686), English gentleman, MP for Calne, 1659
- William Duckett (Calne MP, died 1749) (1685–1749), British Army officer and Whig politician, MP for Calne, 1727–1741
- William Duckett (United Irishman) (1768–1841), United Irishman
- William Duckett (Canadian politician) (1825–1887), merchant and political figure in Quebec
