= Robert Salman =

Member of the Parliament of England

Robert Salman (died by 1444) was a landowner in Calne, Wiltshire. He was the member of Parliament for Malmesbury for the parliament of 1399 and for Calne for multiple parliaments from 1399 to 1417. Salman and his wife were members of the John St. Lo parish church in Calne.
