= John Felawe =

English politician

John Felawe (fl. 1399 – 1414) was an English politician. He sat as MP for Calne in 1399.

He was a juror in a 1402 inquest held to determine the financial contribution of the hundred of Malmesbury toward the marriage dowry of Blanche, Henry IV's eldest daughter. He also stood surety for the attendance of Robert Roude at the May 1414 Parliament.
