= John Bailey (MP) =

English politician (died 1436)

John Bailey (died 1436) was the member of Parliament for Calne in the parliament of 1420 and for Cricklade in the parliament of 1427.
