= William Wichampton =

William Wichampton or Wychamptone (fl. 1378–1388), of Calne, Wiltshire, was an English Member of Parliament (MP).

He was a Member of the Parliament of England for Calne in 1378, January 1380, 1381, October 1382, April 1384, November 1384, 1385, and February 1388.
