= William Baseley =

16th-century English politician

William Bazeley (by 1521 – 1573/74), of Lambeth and Southwark, Surrey and Garsdon, Wiltshire, was an English politician.

He was a member (MP) of the parliament of England for Calne in April 1554 and for Wiltshire in 1555.
