= Joseph Jekyll (1754–1837) =

English lawyer and politician

Joseph Jekyll FRS (1 January 1754 – 8 March 1837) was a British Whig member of parliament for Calne, Wiltshire.

He was the eldest son of Capt. Edward Jekyll, R.N., of Haverfordwest and was educated at Westminster School (1766–1770) and Christ Church, Oxford, where he was awarded BA in 1774 and MA in 1777. He trained for the law at Lincoln's Inn from 1769 and was called to the bar in 1778.

In 1782, Jekyll wrote a memoir of the black composer Ignatius Sancho to preface the collection of Sancho's letters. Initially published anonymously, the memoir was attributed to Jekyll in the 1803 edition of the Letters.

He was elected in 1790 a Fellow of the Royal Society as "'a Gentleman conversant in various Branches of Literature".

In 1801, he married Maria, the daughter of the MP Hans Sloane, with whom he had two sons. The youngest was the father of the garden designer, Gertrude Jekyll.

He was made a bencher at the Inner Temple in 1805, a reader in 1814 and treasurer in 1816. He was appointed solicitor-general to the Prince of Wales and was made King's Counsel in 1805.

In 1787, he was elected member of parliament for Calne, a seat he held until 1816, after which he resigned by accepting the notional crown appointment as Steward of the Chiltern Hundreds.

In 1824, Jekyll inherited the Wargrave Hill (now Wargrave Manor) estate in Berkshire, although he preferred to live in Mayfair and so rented it out to tenants. He died in London in 1837.
