= Walter Norborne =

English politician (died 1659)

Walter Norborne (died 1659) was an English politician who sat in the House of Commons in 1640. He supported the Royalist side in the English Civil War.

Norborne was the son of John Norborne of Hilmarton, Wiltshire.

In April 1640, Norborne was elected Member of Parliament for Calne in the Short Parliament. He supported the King in the Civil War and was fined £380 by the Parliament as a result.

Norborne died in 1659, and according to his epitaph, his loyalty to Church and State provoked the people of Calne to some act of violence at his funeral. He was buried in the north transept of the church, where there is a monumental tablet with an epitaph written in Latin and Greek by Thomas Pierce, President of Magdalen College Oxford.

Norborne married Mary Chivers, daughter of Henry Chivers of Quemerford and his wife Elizabeth Seacole of Milton, Oxfordshire. His son Walter was later MP for Calne until he was killed in a duel.

Parliament of England
Parliament suspended since 1629	Member of Parliament for Calne; 1640; With: William Maynard	Succeeded by George Lowe; Hugh Rogers
