= Homme House =

18th-century house in Herefordshire, England

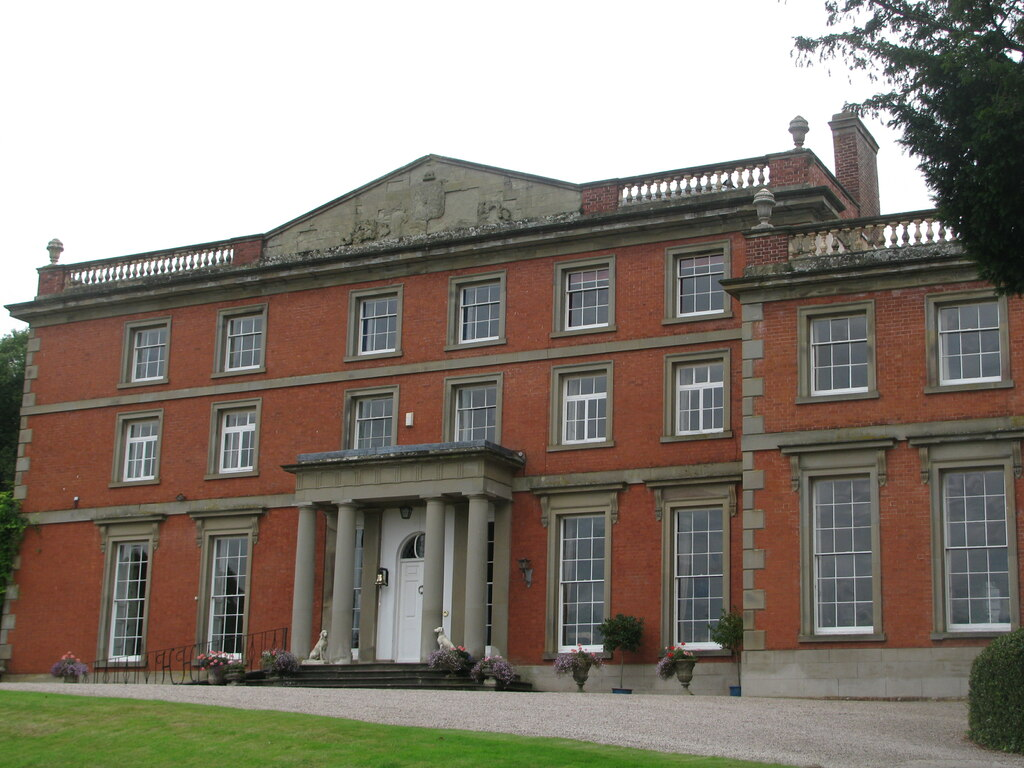

- Location within Herefordshire
- 51.983814°N 2.505493°W
- Location: Much Marcle, Herefordshire

Site notes
- Area: United Kingdom

Listed Building – Grade II*
- Official name: Homme House
- Designated: 18 November 1952
- Reference no.: 1099009

Homme House is an 18th-century country house in Much Marcle, Herefordshire, England. Primarily built of brick, it is now used as a wedding venue and is a Grade II* listed building.

Originally built in the 16th century of stone it was substantially rebuilt and enlarged in the late 18th century in brick with stone dressings and a slate roof. The frontage of the main rectangular block has three storeys and six bays, with a porch having two pairs of Tuscan columns beneath a pediment. Only the attached tower remains of the previous stone building.

The house stands in an estate of gardens, 100 acres (40 ha) of parkland and 80 acres (32 ha) of woodland. A Grade I listed summerhouse stands in the grounds.

== History ==
The Homme estate was acquired from the crown by Thomas Kyrle in 1574. His son John was created a baronet and was twice High Sheriff of Herefordshire. He was succeeded by his grandson and the latter by his eldest daughter Vincentia, who married Sir John Ernle, son of the Chancellor of the Exchequer. Their daughter Constantia married but had no children and the estate passed to her cousin's son, James Money, whose grandson James added the Kyrle name to his own and was created a baronet.

The estate passed down in the Money-Kyrle family for several generations until inherited by Roger Money-Kyrle, who sold the estate, much reduced in size, to his uncle, the Reverend Cecil Money-Kyrle, vicar of Much Marcle. It then descended via Cecil's sister’s grandson, Vice-Admiral John Ernle Pope, to the family of the latter’s step-daughter who possess it today.

During the Second World War, Homme House was used as a hospital.
