= Richard Chamberlain (MP for Calne) =

English politician

Richard Chamberlain (fl. 1420) of Calne, Wiltshire, was an English politician.

He was a member (MP) of the parliament of England for Calne in 1420.
