= Rowland Wilson (politician) =

English politician (1613–1650)

Rowland Wilson (1613 – 19 February 1650) was an English politician who sat in the House of Commons between 1645 and 1650. He fought in the Parliamentary army in the English Civil War.

Wilson was the son of Rowland Wilson (died 16 May 1654) of Gresegarth and London, and his wife Mary Tiffin, daughter of John Tiffin of London. His father was a wealthy merchant in the City of London. Wilson was a member of the Worshipful Company of Vintners. During the civil war he was lieutenant-colonel of the orange regiment of the London trained bands, and commanded it in October 1643. He joined the army of the Earl of Essex after the First Battle of Newbury, and took part in the occupation of Newport Pagnell.

In 1645, Wilson was elected Member of Parliament for Calne in the Long Parliament. He became an alderman of the City of London for Bridge ward on 28 November 1648. He was elected Councillor of State in 1649 and was nominated as a judge for the trial of King Charles in 1649 but did not act. He became Sheriff of London in July 1649 and was re-elected to the Council of State in 1650.

Wilson married Mary Carleton, daughter of Bigley Carleton. She later married Bulstrode Whitelocke as his third wife.
