= George Lowe (MP) =

English politician (1594–1682)

George Lowe (c. 1594 – 19 November 1682) was an English politician who sat in the House of Commons at various times between 1640 and 1679. He was an equivocal supporter of the Royalist cause in the English Civil War.

Lowe was the second surviving son of Richard Lowe, a barrister of Shrewsbury and Calne (Wiltshire) and his second wife Mary Wootton, daughter of Charles Wotton, merchant, of Salisbury, and widow of John Vennard of Salisbury. His father was MP for Calne in 1614 and his uncle George Lowe, a London merchant, represented the town from 1625 to 1629. He came into his mother's property at Calne in 1640.

In November 1640, Lowe was elected Member of Parliament for Calne in the Long Parliament. During the Civil War he supported the Royalist cause and sat at the parliament in Oxford. He later claimed that he acted under duress, and that he was not party to the vote declaring the Parliamentarian members at Westminster to be traitors. He was disabled from sitting at Westminster on 5 February 1644, but as a result of his voluntary and early surrender to Edward Massey, he was treated leniently by the committee for compounding and was fined at a tenth instead of a third of his estate. On release in 1646 he became a J.P. for Oxfordshire until 1653. He was commissioner for assessment for Oxfordshire from 1649 to 1652.

After the Restoration, Lowe became J.P. for Wiltshire from July 1660 and commissioner for assessment for Wiltshire from August 1660, holding both roles until 1663. He was commissioner for assessment for Oxford from 1661 to 1679. In 1661 he was elected MP for Calne again in the Cavalier Parliament. He was commissioner for corporations for Wiltshire from 1662 to 1663. In 1665, he was bailiff of Oxford and served as assistant bailiff from 1666 until his death. He was Clerk of petty bag from 1666 to 1680. In 1673 he became commissioner for assessment for Wiltshire until 1680 and also commissioner for assessment for Salisbury for a year. He was commissioner for recusants for Wiltshire in 1675.

Lowe died at the age of 88 according to his memorial in St Aldate's Church, Oxford, which has the inscription "he exerted himself for forty years, more or less, in the illustrious court of senators (commonly called Parliament) no less to the approbation of individuals than to the advantage of the public".

Lowe married twice, having no children from his first wife. He married secondly in about 1651 Jane Drake, widow of Acton Drake of Shorthampton Lodge, Charlbury, Oxfordshire and daughter of Martin Wright, goldsmith of Oxford. She died on 9 September 1655 after the birth of a son. He bequeathed his houses in Oxford and Salisbury to his nephew Sir Edward Lowe, master in Chancery.

Parliament of England
Preceded by William Maynard; Walter Norborne	Member of Parliament for Calne; 1640–1644; With: Hugh Rogers	Succeeded by Hugh Rogers; Rowland Wilson
