= George Duckett (Calne MP) =

British lawyer and Whig politician

George Duckett (19 February 1684 – 6 October 1732), of Hartham House, Corsham, Wiltshire, was a British lawyer and Whig politician who sat in the English and British House of Commons for between 1705 and 1723. He was also a poet and author who was literary combatant of Alexander Pope.

== Early life ==
Duckett was the eldest son of Lionel Duckett and his wife Martha (née Ashe, 1651–1688), daughter of Samuel Ashe of Langley Burrell, Wiltshire. In 1693, he succeeded to the estates of his father. He matriculated at Trinity College, Oxford on 29 November 1700, aged 15, and was admitted to the Middle Temple in 1703.

== Career ==
At the 1705 general election, Duckett was returned in a contest as Whig Member of Parliament for Calne, in Wiltshire. He was very active in Parliament, acting several times as Teller. He spoke on the proceedings against Charles Caesar on 19 December 1705 and voted on the Place bill in 1706. He reported from the committee examining a petition relating to the administration of the Fleet prison and promoted a bill on the Calne highway. He was named to draft a bill to end the embargo on the export of white woollen cloth which was a matter of concern to his constituents. He supported his friend John Asgill over a publication and over his subsequent expulsion from the House. At the 1708 general election, he was returned in another contest. He voted for the naturalization of the Palatines in 1709, and for the impeachment of Dr Sacheverell in 1710. At the 1710 general election he was caught up in a double return, and the Tory majority in the new House decided against him and his fellow Whig.

At the 1722 British general election, Duckett was returned again as MP for Calne, but vacated the seat on 28 February 1723 on his appointment as a commissioner of excise, a post he held until 1732.

== Literature ==
Duckett was a friend of Joseph Addison, and he entertained Addison and some of Addison's "little senate" at his estates in Wiltshire. He was also a close friend of Thomas Burnet, and he and Burnet would collaborate on numerous satirical and political writings. In particular, the two teamed up to oppose Alexander Pope after the latter's disaffection with Addison and dispute with Ambrose Philips.

In 1715, Burnet and Duckett wrote Homerides, or, a letter to Mr. Pope, occasion'd by his intended translation of Homer; by Sir Iliad Doggerl, and in 1716 they wrote Homerides, or, Homer's First Book Moderniz'd. Pope accused them of attacking his translation of Homer prior to anything even being written, and with some justice, and Duckett continued the battle with An Epilogue to a Puppet Show at Bath Concerning the same Iliad by himself. Edmund Curll, in his battle against Pope, published the Epilogue. Pope's revenge appeared in The Dunciad of 1728, and in particular in the Dunciad Variorum. Because of their positions in government, Pope did not attack Duckett and Burnet by name in Dunciad itself, and he did not directly impugn them until the Variorum. Duckett and Burnet also funded and contributed to two weekly journals, The Grumbler and Pasquin. He was also the patron of one of Pope's other enemies, John Oldmixon.

In 1717, Duckett published an apolitical, professional work entitled A Summary of All the Religious Houses in England and Wales. It was an accounting of the values of each of the monasteries and convents at the time of the dissolution and their present value, if they were still available. It was this work that brought Duckett to the attention which led to his appointment as a commissioner of excise.

In 1729, Duckett and John Dennis together wrote an anti-Popery booklet called Pope Alexander's Supremacy and Infallibility Examin'd.

== Death and legacy ==
Duckett died at home on his Calne estate in 1732. He had married Grace Skinner (c. 1690–1755) on 23 March 1711. The couple had nine children, eight of whom survived to adulthood.

1. Lionel Duckett (1712–67)
2. Thomas Duckett (1713–1766)
3. Grace Duckett (1714–1784)
4. William Duckett
5. George Duckett
6. William Duckett (died 1780)
7. Skinner Duckett (died 1767)
8. Martha Duckett
9. Catherine Duckett

Parliament of England
Preceded by Henry Chivers; Sir Charles Hedges	Member of Parliament for Calne; 1705–1707; With: Edward Bayntun	Succeeded by Parliament of the United Kingdom
Parliament of Great Britain
Preceded by Parliament of Great Britain	Member of Parliament for Calne; 1707–1710; With: Edward Bayntun	Succeeded by James Johnston; William Hedges
Preceded by Sir Orlando Bridgeman; Richard Chiswell	Member of Parliament for Calne; 1722–1723; With: Benjamin Haskins-Stiles 1722–1723; Edmund Pike Heath 1723	Succeeded by Edmund Pike Heath; Matthew Ducie Moreton
