= Norborne Berkeley (American football) =

American business executive (1891–1964)

- Born: May 13, 1891; Danville, Virginia, U.S.
- Died: May 26, 1964 (aged 73); Baltimore, Maryland, U.S.

Norborne Berkeley (May 13, 1891 – May 26, 1964) was a vice president and director of Bethlehem Steel.

== Biography ==
A native of Danville, Virginia, he was born to Landon C. Berkeley and Anne Poe Harrison. Berkeley attended the University of Virginia, where he was a prominent athlete. He was the quarterback on the football team and shortstop on the baseball team. He served during World War I.
