= HMS Elizabeth (1679) =

Ship of the line of the Royal Navy

History

England
- Name: HMS Elizabeth
- Ordered: March 1678
- Builder: Robert Castle, Deptford
- Launched: 3 March 1679
- Commissioned: 18 January 1680
- Honours and awards: Barfleur 1692
- Captured: 23 November 1704
- Fate: Captured by French, French Navy L'Elisabeth, deleted 1720 at Brest

General characteristics as built
- Class & type: 70-gun third rate ship of the line
- Tons burthen: 1,07292/94 tons (bm)
- Length: 151 ft 8 in (46.23 m) gundeck; 120 ft 0 in (36.58 m) keel for tonnage
- Beam: 41 ft 0 in (12.50 m)
- Draught: 18 ft 0 in (5.49 m)
- Depth of hold: 16 ft 8.5 in (5.09 m)
- Propulsion: Sails
- Sail plan: Full-rigged ship
- Armament: 1677 Establishment 72/60 guns; 26 × demi-cannons 54 cwt – 9.5 ft (LD); 26 × 12-pdr guns 32 cwt – 9 ft (UD); 10 × sakers 16 cwt – 7 ft (QD); 4 × sakers 16 cwt – 7 ft (Fc); 5 × 5 3-pdr guns 5 cwt – 5 ft (RH)

General characteristics after 1704 rebuild
- Class & type: 70-gun third rate ship of the line
- Tons burthen: 1,15345/94 tons (bm)
- Length: 153 ft 3 in (46.71 m) gundeck; 153 ft 3 in (46.71 m) keel for tonnage
- Beam: 41 ft 5.5 in (12.64 m)
- Depth of hold: 17 ft 1.5 in (5.22 m)
- Propulsion: Sails
- Sail plan: Full-rigged ship
- Armament: 1703 Establishment 70/62 guns; 24/22 × 24 pdr guns (LD); 26/24 × demi-culverins (UD); 12/10 × 6-pdr guns (QD); 4/2 × 6-pdr guns (Fc); 4 × 3-pdr guns (RH)

HMS Elizabeth was a 70-gun third rate ordered in March 1678 as one of 20 such Third Rates under the 'Thirty Ships' Programme of 1677. She was built at Castle's private Yard at Deptford by Robert Castle of Rotherhithe in 1678/80. She held an active commission during the War of the English Succession fighting in all three major engagements - Bantry Bay in 1689, Beachy Head in 1690 and Barfleur in 1692. She was rebuilt at Portsmouth between 1699 and 1704. She was captured by the French off the Scilly Islands in November 1704. She was in the French Navy until she was deleted in 1720.

She was the seventh vessel to bear the name Elizabeth since it was used for a 900-ton (bm) vessel purchased in 1514 and wrecked in 1514.

HMS Elizabeth was awarded the Battle Honour Barfleur 1692.

== Construction and specifications ==
She was ordered in March 1678 to be built under contract by Robert Castle of Deptford on the River Thames. She was launched on 3 March 1679. Her dimensions were a gundeck of 151 feet 8 inches (46.23 metres) with a keel of 120 feet 0 inches (36.58 metres) for tonnage calculation with a breadth of 41 feet 0 inches (12.50 metres) and a depth of hold of 16 feet 8.5 inches (5.09 metres). Her builder's measure tonnage was calculated as 1,07292/94 tons (burthen). Her draught was 18 feet 0 inches (5.49 metres).

Her initial gun armament was in accordance with the 1677 Establishment with 72/60 guns consisting of twenty-six demi-cannons (54 cwt, 9.5 ft) on the lower deck, twenty-six 12-pounder guns (32 cwt, 9 ft) on the upper deck, ten sakers (16 cwt, 7 ft) on the quarterdeck and four sakers (16 cwt, 7 ft) on the foc's'le with four 3-pounder guns (5 cwt, 5 ft) on the poop deck or roundhouse. By 1688 she would carry 70 guns as per the 1685 Establishment . Her initial manning establishment would be for a crew of 460/380/300 personnel.

== Commissioned service ==
=== Service 1680-1699 ===
She was commissioned on 18 January 1680 under the temporary command of Captain Tomas Willshaw for delivery to Chatham. In 1688 she was under the command of Captain John Nevill as the Flagship of Rear-Admiral Sir John Berry sailing with Lord Dartmouth's Fleet in 1689. She was under Captain David Mitchell in April 1689 as the Flagship of Admiral Arthur Herbert. She was the Flagship of the English Fleet in the Battle of Bantry Bay on 1 May 1689. She followed this by fighting in the Battle of Beachy Head in Red Squadron on 30 June 1690. Later in 1690 she was under Captain Henry Priestman. In 1692 Captain Stafford Fairborne was in command. She was in the Battle of Barfleur as a member of Red Squadron, Centre Division between 19 and 22 May 1692.

Captain Robert Wilmot was in command in 1693 with the Channel Fleet. In 1694 she was under Captain Edward Whitaker sailing with Lord Berkeley's operations. In 1695 her commander was Captain James Greenaway sailing with Russel's Fleet. In 1696 she was under Captain John Fletcher sailing in the Soundings. In 1697 she was under the command of Captain Thomas Sherman at Portsmouth. She would be rebuilt at Portsmouth in 1703-04.

=== Rebuild Portsmouth 1699-1702 ===
She was ordered to be rebuilt on 25 February 1699 at Portsmouth Dockyard under the guidance of Master Shipwright Elias Waffe. Mr. Waffe left the dockyard in August 1702, and she was completed by Thomas Podd. She was launched/completed on 3 September 1704. Her dimensions were a gundeck of 153 feet 3 inches (46.71 metres) with a keel of 126 feet 2 inches (38.46 metres) for tonnage calculation with a breadth of 41 feet 5.5 inches (12.64 metres) and a depth of hold of 17 feet 1.5 inches (5.22 metres). Her builder's measure tonnage was calculated as 1,15345/94 tons (burthen). She probably retained her armament as stated in the 1685 Establishment, though it is unclear if her armament was changed to the 1703 Establishment later. It is known that when completed her gun armament total at least 70 guns.

=== Service 1704 ===
She was commissioned in 1704 under the command of Captain William Cross.

== Loss ==
She was taken by the French 54-gun Auguste and Jason plus the 26-gun Valeur of Duguay-Trouin's Squadron off the Isles of Scilly on 12 November 1704 . Captain Cross was dismissed by court martial. She was incorporated into the French Navy until 1720 when she was removed at Brest.

== See also ==
- List of ships captured in the 18th century
