= James Kyrle-Money =

British soldier and landowner

Major-General Sir James Kyrle-Money, 1st Baronet (15 August 1775 – 26 June 1843) was a British soldier and landowner.

== Life ==
Born James Money, he was the eldest son of William Money, of Homme House, Much Marcle, Herefordshire, and Mary Webster, daughter of William Webster, of Stockton-on-Tees, County Durham. He was a descendant of Francis Money, of Wellingborough, Northamptonshire, who married Elizabeth Washbourne, daughter and heiress of William Washbourne and Hester Ernle, daughter and heiress of Sir John Ernle and Vincentia Kyrle, eldest daughter and co-heiress of Sir John Kyrle, of Much Marcle. He succeeded to his father's estate at Homme House in 1808 and assumed by Royal licence the additional surname of Kyrle in 1809.

Money served in the British Army and was made an ensign in 1793, a major in 1804, a lieutenant-colonel in 1811, a colonel in 1825 and a major-general in 1838. In 1838, also, he was created a baronet, of Hom House in the County of Hereford, Whetham in the County of Wiltshire and Pitsford in the County of Northampton, in 1838.

Escutcheon of the Kyrle-Money baronets

Kyrle-Money died in June 1843, when the title became extinct.

== Family ==
Kyrle-Money married Caroline Anne Taylor, daughter of Robert Taylor, of London, in 1809; the marriage was childless. His estates, including Homme House, passed to his brother William, who changed his name by Royal Licence to William Money Kyrle.

Among his other brothers were:

- Captain Rowland Money CB RN, grandfather of Kyrle Bellew the son of his daughter Maria
- Rev. Kyrle Ernle Money, Prelector and Prebendary of Hereford Cathedral
- Commander John Money of the Indian Navy

Baronetage of the United Kingdom
| New creation | Baronet (of Hom House, Whetham and Pitsford); 1838–1843 | Extinct |
| Preceded by Stuart-Menteth baronets | Kyrle-Money baronets of Hom House; 13 August 1838 | Succeeded by Guest baronets |
