= William Duckett (Calne MP, died 1686) =

English gentleman and MP

Member of Parliament for Calne

Personal details
- Born: BEF 23 May 1624 Hartham House, Corsham, Wiltshire
- Died: 1 November 1686 (aged 62) Calne, Wiltshire
- Spouses: Elizabeth Henshaw (m. 1650–1654); Anne Knight (m. 1655–1667); Margaret Moore (m. 1669–1686)
- Parent(s): John Duckett, Jane Winter

See also William Duckett (disambiguation)

William Duckett (bapt. 23 May 1624 – 1 November 1686) was an English gentleman who sat in the House of Commons between 1659 and 1679.

Duckett was the son of John Duckett, of Hartham House, Corsham, Wiltshire, a Royalist gentleman, and his wife, Jane Winter or Wintour. He matriculated at St John's College, Oxford, on 3 July 1640 aged 16. He was student of the Inner Temple in 1642.

In 1659, Duckett was elected Member of Parliament for Calne in the Third Protectorate Parliament. In 1660, he was re-elected for Calne in the Convention Parliament. He was re-elected in 1661 for the Cavalier Parliament and sat until 1679. The few electors were under Duckett family control, and his father had been returned for Calne in 1621 and 1624.

== Family ==
Duckett married three times:

Firstly, on 6 March 1650, he married Elizabeth Henshaw (baptised 29 April 1621 – c.1654) at St Bartholomew-the-Great in London, a sister of the alchemist Thomas Henshaw, with issue including:

- Lionel Duckett (1652–1693), who was also a member of parliament for Calne.

Secondly, about 1655, he remarried, as a widower, the widow Anne Chapman née Knight (died 1667), with issue including:

- Jane Duckett (1657–1713)
- Three short-lived sons

Thirdly, about September 1669 (licence: 13 September 1669, Bristol), he remarried, as a widower, Margaret Moore (d. 1694), a daughter of Sir Henry Moore, 2nd Baronet, of Fawley, Berkshire. There were no documented children from this marriage.

Duckett died on 1 November 1686 at his home in Calne, Wiltshire, at the age of 62. He was buried on 5 November 1686. His will was executed by his widow, Margaret, with probate on 3 January 1687.

Parliament of England
Preceded by Not represented in Protectorate parliaments	Member of Parliament for Calne; 1659; With: Edward Bayntun	Succeeded by Hugh Rogers
