= Thomas Richmond Webb =

English politician

Thomas Richmond Webb (c. 1663 – 16 November 1731), of the Middle Temple; St. George's, Hanover Square, Middlesex; and Rodbourne Cheney, Wiltshire, was an English politician.

He was a Member (MP) of the Parliament of England for Calne in 1685–1687, Cricklade in 1702–1705 and Devizes on 16 December 1710 – 1713.
