= Roger Money-Kyrle =

British psychoanalyst

- Born: Roger Ernle Money-Kerle; 31 January 1898; Hertfordshire, England
- Died: 29 July 1980 (aged 82); London, England
- Awards: Member of the British Psycho-Analytical Society
- Scientific career
- Fields: Psychiatry; Social psychology
- Doctoral advisor: Moritz Schlick; John Flügel

Roger Ernle Money-Kyrle (31 January 1898 – 29 July 1980) was a British psychoanalyst, renowned for his wide-ranging intellect and interest in the ways an individual psyche relates to the wider sphere of human society. A member of the British Psycho-Analytical Society, Money-Kyrle blended the British empirical tradition and a neo-positivistic approach to philosophy of the Viennese school of Moritz Schlick, in areas of social scientific research which would later be referred to as social psychology.

== Career ==
Money-Kyrle was born in Hertfordshire in 1898. He was the fourth child and only son surviving childhood of Audley and Florence Money-Kyrle. Sent to boarding school aged 10 and graduating from Eton aged 18, he immediately enlisted in the Royal Flying Corps during World War I. He was shot down once in northern France. At the end of the war, he resumed his studies at Trinity College, Cambridge, pursuing a bachelor's degree in physics and mathematics, then shifting his attention to philosophy. He became interested in psychoanalysis, and began analysis with Ernest Jones in 1919.

He married Helen Juliet Rachel "Minora" Fox, an anthropologist he met in Cambridge during their studies, and they had four children. In 1919, he moved to Vienna for four years, where he worked on his PhD in philosophy, while continuing his analysis with Sigmund Freud. He later described his thesis, Contribution to the Theory of Reality (1925), as psychoanalysis disguised as philosophy.

While visiting Germany prior to Adolf Hitler's appointment as chancellor, Money-Kyrle attended multiple campaign rallies and became intrigued by how political speech used by such authoritarian movements morphs into manipulation and propaganda where political illusions replace rational policy solutions. He wrote:

The speeches were not particularly impressive. But the crowd was unforgettable. The people seemed gradually to lose their individuality and to become fused into a not very intelligent but immensely powerful monster [that was] under the complete control of the figure on the rostrum [who] evoked or changed its passions as easily as if they had been notes of some gigantic organ.

The three notes described in his article "The Psychology of Propaganda" is a progression that was repeated at each rally. "Each listener felt a part of its [the movement's] omnipotence within himself. He was transported into a new psychosis. The induced melancholia passed into paranoia, and the paranoia into megalomania."^{:168}

For ten minutes we heard of the sufferings of Germany […] since the war. The monster seemed to indulge in an orgy of self-pity. Then for the next ten minutes came the most terrific fulminations against Jews and Social-democrats as the sole authors of these sufferings. Self-pity gave place to hate; and the monster seemed on the point of becoming homicidal. But the note was changed once more; and this time we heard for ten minutes about the growth of the Nazi party, and how from small beginnings it had now become an overpowering force. The monster became self-conscious of its size, and intoxicated by the belief in its own omnipotence.^{:166}

Returning to England, he attended University College London and pursued his second PhD – in anthropology – under the direction of John Carl Flügel. His thesis entitled "The Meaning of Sacrifice" was presented and defended in 1929. On the basis of this first psychoanalytic work he was elected a fellow of the Royal Anthropological Institute. In 1936, he entered analysis with Melanie Klein.

During World War II, he worked for the Air Ministry which sent him to Germany after the war to help identify suitable individuals to govern Germany, working with John Rickman at the German Personnel Research Branch in Berlin. Upon his return to London, he carried on activities as a psychoanalyst and essayist, contributing to Kleinian theoretical development and to the cultural and social application of phenomena generally linked to philosophy and sociology.

== Work ==
=== Basic facts of life ===
Roger Money-Kyrle is known for his concept of the basic facts of life, which to him are three undeniable facts that characterize human existence.^{:443} These are:

1. A person's initial dependence on the mother's breast – "the breast as a supremely good object";
2. The exclusion from the primal scene – "the parents' intercourse as a supremely creative act";
3. The inevitability of time's progression and death.

Each of these are insults to the narcissistic constitution of the self, since they express dependency, exclusion, and reduction. As such they make for intense psychic obsessions.

These facts are inter-related. If a person's relationship to the maternal breast had been a positive one, then it will be easier for that person to "conceptualize his parents' intercourse as a supremely creative act […] because he will have had much less incentive to construct a misconception of intercourse as a by-product of fantasies of projective identification."^{:446} The presence of a good-enough breast facilitates the mourning for the child–parent marriage that can never be.

The first two facts of life are of particular analytic importance, since they arrive as pre-conceptions in our lives and their transformation into conceptions is subject to analytic treatment.^{:447} If mourning of the loss of the maternal breast is successful, the child can move through the Oedipus complex, recognize the parents' intercourse as creative, and internalize it as a template for a marriage of its own.

Ultimately, the recognition of these three facts also delimits the self-analytic function of a person who was once an analysand. For the self-analytic function operates in an omnipotent way, as it gives rise to the "megalomanic delusion of parthenogenic creativity"; rather, all one can do "is to allow your internal parents to come together and they will beget and conceive the child."^{:442}

== Publications ==
=== Papers ===
- Money-Kyrle, Roger (1941). "The Psychology of Propaganda". British Journal of Medical Psychology. XIX: 82–94.
- Money-Kyrle, Roger (1968). "The Psychology of Propaganda". International Journal of Psychoanalysis. XLIX (4): 691–698.
- Money-Kyrle, Roger (1971). "The Aim of Psychoanalysis". International Journal of Psychoanalysis. LII (1): 103–106.

=== Books ===
- Money-Kyrle, Roger (1929). The Meaning of Sacrifice (PDF). London: Hogarth Press.
- Money-Kyrle, Roger (1951). Psychoanalysis and Politics. A Contribution to the Philosophy of Politics and Morals. London: Gerald Duckworth.
- Money-Kyrle, Roger (1961). Man's Picture of His World. A Psycho-analytic Study. London: Gerald Duckworth.
- Money-Kyrle, Roger (1978). Meltzer, Donald; O'Shaughnessy, Edna (eds.). The Collected Papers of Roger Money-Kyrle. Strath Tay: Clunie Press.
