= Much Marcle =

Village in Herefordshire, England

Coordinates: 51.99169°N 2.49948°W

- St Bartholomew's Church

- Location within Herefordshire
- Population: 660 (2011 Census)
- OS grid reference: SO6532
- Civil parish: Much Marcle
- Unitary authority: Herefordshire
- Region: West Midlands
- Country: England
- Sovereign state: United Kingdom
- Post town: Ledbury
- Postcode district: HR8
- Dialling code: 01531
- Police: West Mercia
- Fire: Hereford and Worcester
- Ambulance: West Midlands
- UK Parliament: North Herefordshire
- Website: Much Marcle

Much Marcle is a village and civil parish in Herefordshire, England, located 7 miles (11 km) north-east of Ross-on-Wye. The 2011 Census recorded the parish's population as 660. The name Marcle comes from the Anglo-Saxon word for a boundary field, mearc-leah. Much, in this case, means large or great, from the Middle English usage of the word.

== Historic village ==
In the Domesday Book of 1086, Much Marcle was listed as Merchelai in the hundred of Wimundestreu and contained 36 households, a large settlement following the Norman Conquest.

Hellens Manor stands in the centre of the village. In 1096, the manor was granted by King William II to Hamelin de Balun, whose family later witnessed the signing of Magna Carta. It contains period furnishings, paintings and decorations, and has a Tudor garden. The manor is open to the public and provides a venue for educational, musical and literary events.

The other principal seat is Homme House, surrounded by ancient parkland. There are also two ruined medieval castles in the parish. One is Mortimer's Castle, also known as Much Marcle Castle. The second is Ellingham Castle which is situated at Quarry Wood.

The Church of England parish church of St Bartholomew is 13th-century with historic carvings and an ancient 'hollow' yew tree thought to be at least 1500 years old. The church contains the tomb of Blanche Mortimer, of the dynasty of Marcher Lords, the Mortimers; the tomb bears the Mortimer coat of arms. She married Peter de Grandison.

The Kyrle Tomb, Much Marcle Church

The Kyrle Tomb is located in the centre of the chapel. It has effigies of Sir John Kyrle of nearby Homme House and his wife Sybil Scudamore. Sir John was born in 1568 and served as High Sheriff of the county in 1609 and 1629. He was created a baronet in 1627. Later he protested against the payment of Ship Money, and in the English Civil War he supported the Parliamentarians. He died in 1650.

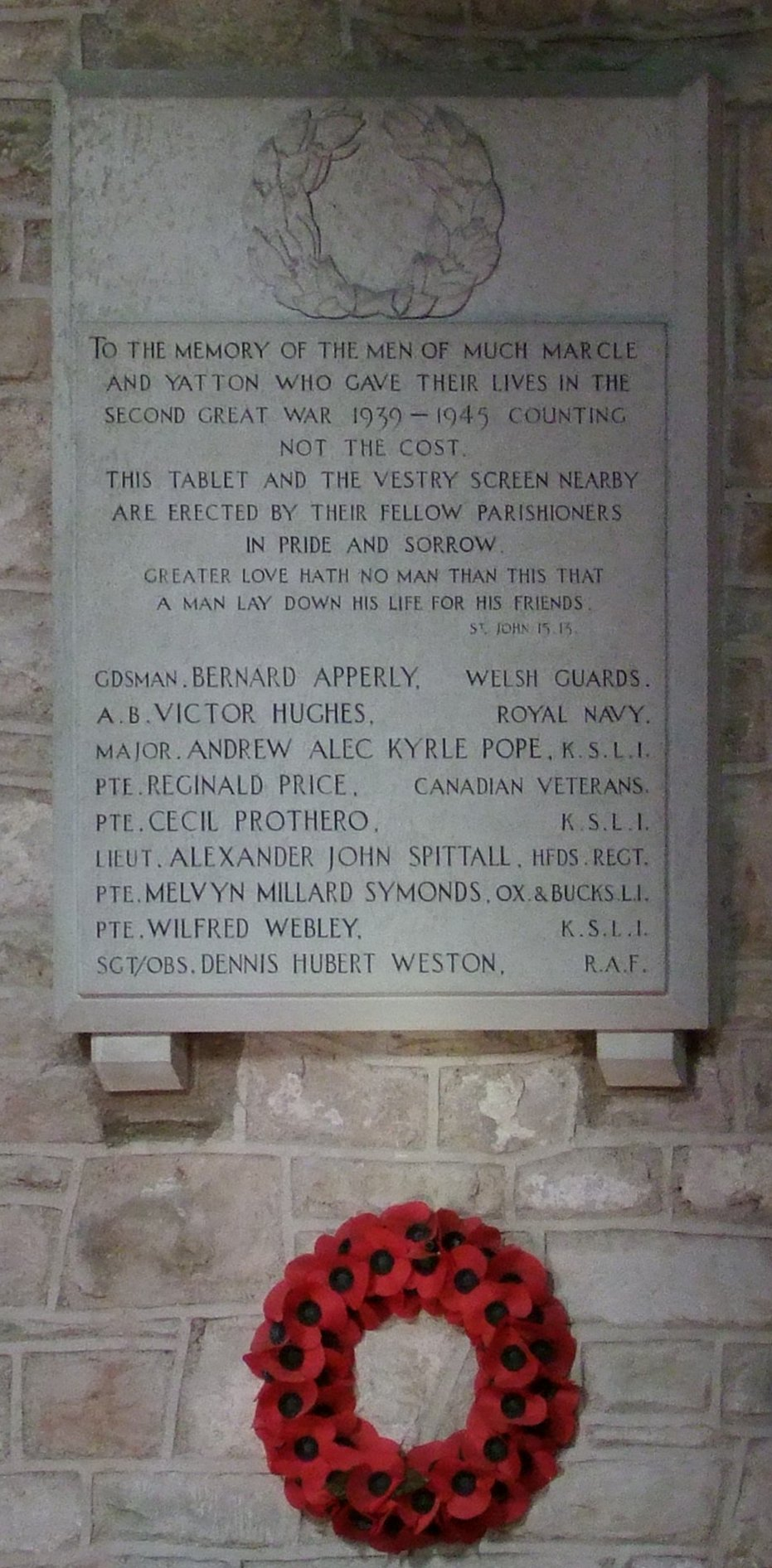
Second World War Memorial in St Bartholomew's parish church

Following the Second World War, a plaque listing the names of those men who lost their lives serving in the military was placed in Saint Bartholomew's Church. Many of their surnames have been known in the region for many centuries.

== The Wonder ==
About three miles (5 km) north-north west of the village, on the eastern face of Marcle Ridge, a massive landslip, estimated at 2,000,000 cubic feet (60,000 cubic metres), took place over three days starting on 17 February 1575. Named "The Wonder", it was so large that full-grown trees were carried down the slope onto an adjoining property. In his book The Natural History and Antiquities of Selborne, Gilbert White (1720–93) quotes the words of John Philips:

I nor advise, nor reprehend the choice
Of Marcley Hill; the apple nowhere finds
A kinder mould; yet 'tis unsafe to trust
Deceitful ground; who knows but that once more
This mount may journey, and his present site
Forsaken, to thy neighbour's bounds transfer
Thy goodly plants, affording matter strange
For law debates!

In Victorian times, people came from far and wide to view "The Wonder". It is shown on the Ordnance Survey map at reference SO632365, but on the ground the site is not readily discernible.

== Farming traditions ==
Notable local farms include the Bounds, home of Weston's Cider and the Scrumpy House Restaurant. Other principal farms include Chandois, Street Farm, Great Moor Court, Bickerton, Gammage Ford, Caerswall, Upper Woltan, Walls End and Noggin, all of which are of ancient origin but with buildings dating from the 17th and 18th centuries. Many of the ancient cottages that appear in the 18th-century maps no longer exist, although there are several good examples of "black and white" half-timbered buildings that have survived, especially in the village's main street.

== Modern times ==
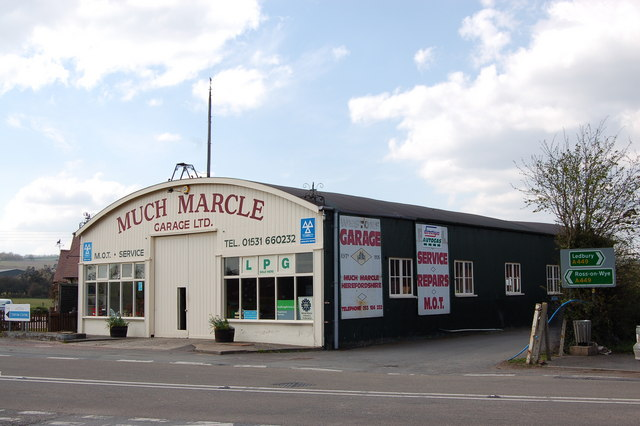
Garage on A449 at Much Marcle

The village has a Church of England primary school located next to the church. It also has local cider and perry mills, one producing Weston's brands. and another producing Gregg's brands.

Much Marcle Garage is housed in a re-purposed First World War aircraft hangar, designated a Grade II listed building. The hangar, of Belfast-truss construction, came from RAF Minchinhampton in Gloucestershire.

== Notable people ==
Much Marcle was the birthplace of serial killer Fred West. Three of his victims were buried there: his nanny Anna McFall and their unborn child, in 1967; and his first wife, Rena, in 1971.
