= James Vernon the Younger =

British politician

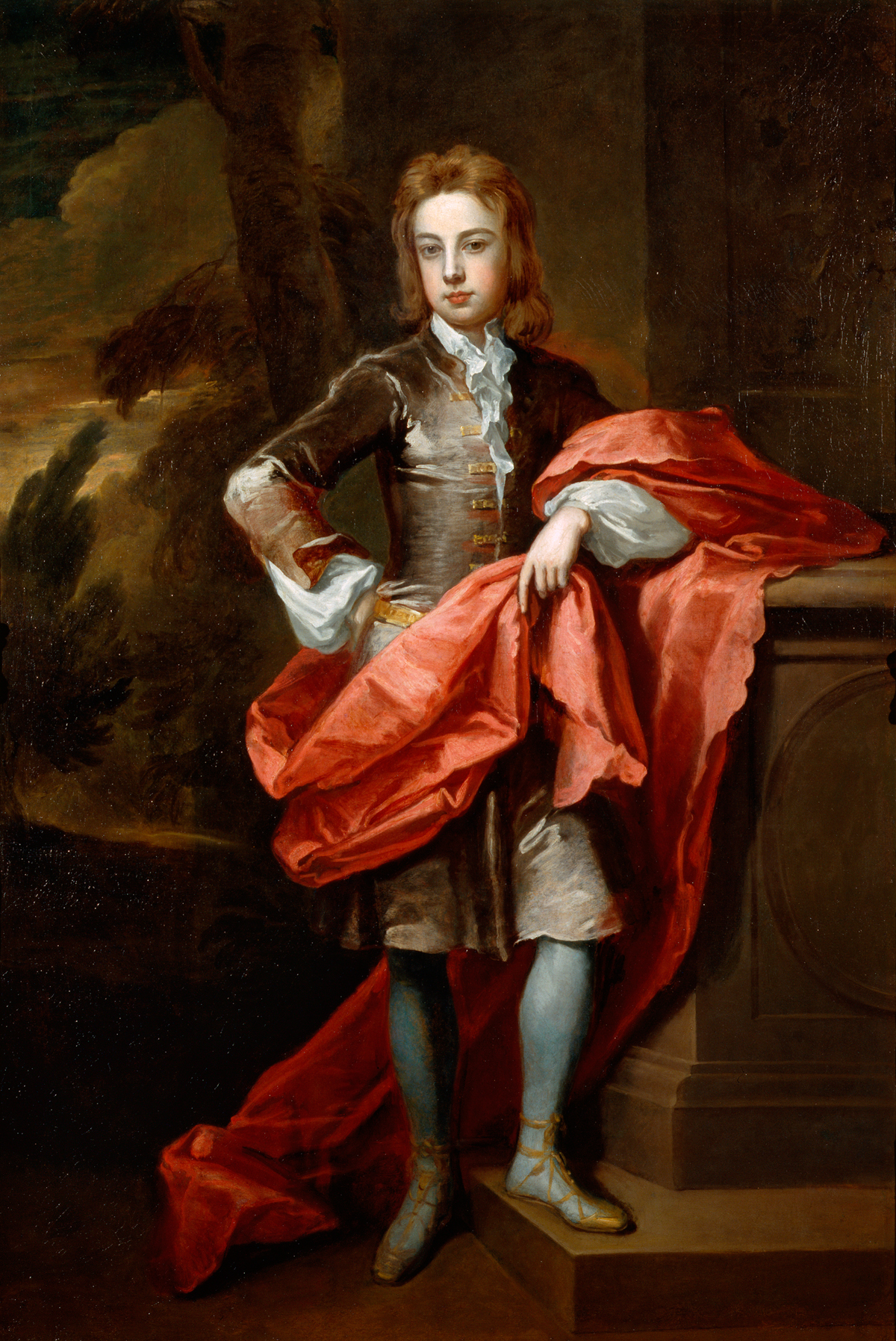
James Vernon the Younger in the 1690s

James Vernon the Younger (15 June 1677 – 17 April 1756) was a British government official, courtier, diplomat and Whig politician who sat in the House of Commons from 1708 to 1710. He was an envoy to Denmark from 1702 to 1707.

== Early life ==
Vernon was the eldest son of James Vernon and his wife Mary Buck, daughter of Sir John Buck, 1st Baronet, of Hamby Grange, Lincolnshire. His father was Secretary of State under William III. He was educated at Utrecht in 1690, at Rotterdam from 1690 to 1692 and a Utrecht again from 1696 to 1697.

== Career ==
In 1691, Vernon was appointed serjeant of the chandlery. He was appointed an extra clerk of Her Majesty's Most Honourable Privy Council in 1697. His first parliamentary attempt was in a by-election in 1698 at Penryn when he was unsuccessful. He was groom of bedchamber to Duke of Gloucester from 1698 to 1700. From his close attendance on the Duke he contracted the illness from which the Duke died, and took several months to recover. At the second general election of 1701, he and his father contested St Mawes, but were unable to overcome the established interest. From 1701 to 1702 he was a Commissioner of the privy seal. In May 1702, he was elected a Fellow of the Royal Society. He served as British envoy to Denmark from 1702 to 1707 and was groom of bedchamber to the Prince of Denmark from 1702 to 1708.

At the 1708 British general election Vernon was returned as Whig Member of Parliament for Cricklade. In early 1709 he supported the naturalization of the Palatines, and in 1710 voted for the impeachment of Dr Sacheverell, later airing his dismay that Whig leaders had made such a fuss about ‘a factious preacher much below their notice’. He became a Commissioner for excise in 1710, in compensation for his father's dismissal as teller of the Exchequer. The post, worth £800 a year, made him ineligible to stand at the 1710 British general election.

== Later life ==
Vernon disentangled himself from politics and chose to serve the Tory administration as an official. In 1713, he married Arethusa Boyle daughter of Charles Boyle, Lord Clifford of Lanesborough. When King George I came to the throne in 1714 and the Whigs were in power his Whig background served him and he not only kept his post but was also appointed a Clerk of the Privy Council in 1715, which he held for the rest of his life. In 1716 he was again Commissioner of the Privy Seal. He lost his post at the Excise in 1726 after a disagreement with Walpole, but it was restored in 1728. In 1727 he succeeded his father.

In 1713, Vernon married Arethusa Boyle d. 1728, daughter of Charles Boyle, 3rd Viscount Dungarvan and Arethusa Berkeley, with whom he had issue including Francis Vernon d. 1783 who was created 1st Earl of Shipbrook (I).

Vernon devoted his efforts to religious and charitable works. He was a sponsor of the foundation of the colony of Georgia and a trustee for Bray's charity. His government duties kept him in London, but by 1733 he had purchased an estate at Great Thurlow, Suffolk, for £15,000. Later he built workhouses for several Suffolk parishes. He died on 15 or 17 April 1756, and was buried at Great Thurlow.

Diplomatic posts
| Preceded by Hugh Greg | British envoy to Denmark; 1702–1707 | Succeeded by Daniel Pulteney |
Parliament of Great Britain
| Preceded by Samuel Barker; Edmund Dunch | Member of Parliament for Cricklade; 1708–1710; With: Edmund Dunch | Succeeded by Samuel Robinson; Edmund Dunch |
