= Edmund Dunch (Whig) =

English politician

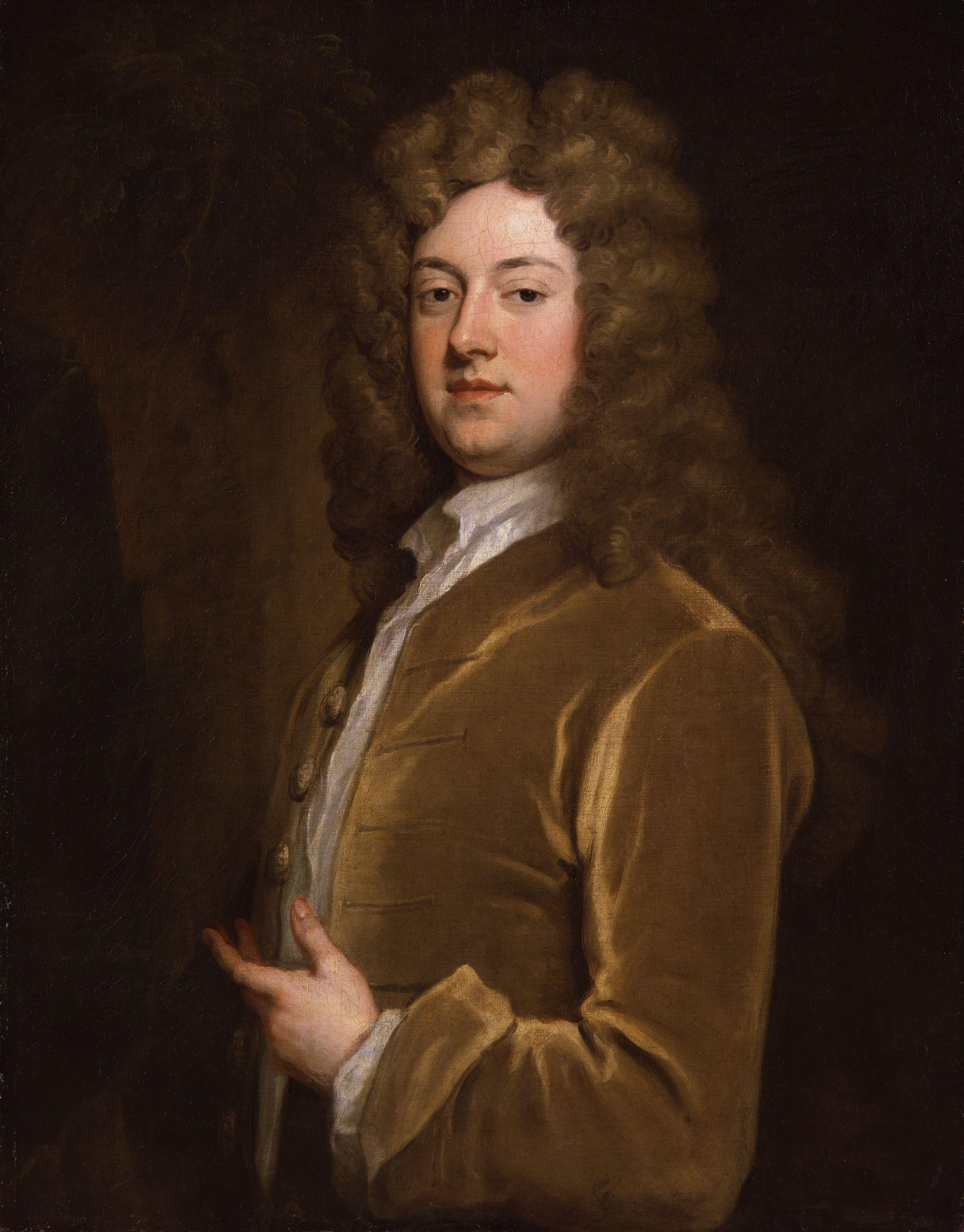
Portrait of Edmund Dunch by Godfrey Kneller

Edmund Dunch (or Dunche; 14 December 1677 – 31 May 1719) of Little Wittenham, Berkshire and Down Ampney, Gloucestershire, was an English Whig politician who sat in the English and British House of Commons between 1701 and 1719.

He was Master of the Royal Household to Queen Anne.

== Early life ==
Dunch was the only son of Hungerford Dunch MP of Little Wittenham and Down Ampney and his wife, Catherine Oxton (married 18 April 1677), daughter of William Oxton of Hertfordshire. He was born in Little Jermyn Street, London, 14 December 1677, and baptised 1 January 1678.

The freedom of the borough Wallingford was conferred on him on 17 October 1695, and he was at one time proposed as its high steward, but was defeated by Lord Abingdon, who polled fifteen votes to his six.

On 2 May 1702, Dunch married Elizabeth Godfrey, one of the maids of honour to the queen, and one of the two daughters and coheiresses of Colonel Charles Godfrey, by Arabella Churchill, sister to the Duke of Marlborough. Her elder sister Charlotte, married Hugh Boscawen, afterwards Lord Falmouth.

== Political career ==
Dunch joined heartily in the Glorious Revolution of 1688, and seems to have been a Whig throughout life. He was returned unopposed as Member of Parliament for the borough of Cricklade at the two elections in January and November 1701 but was defeated in a contest in July 1702. He was re-elected MP for Cricklade in the general elections of 1705, 1708 and 1710. At the 1713 general election he was returned unopposed as MP for Boroughbridge in Yorkshire. He was elected MP for Wallingford, a constituency which several of his ancestors had served in parliament at the 1715 general election and sat until his death four years later.

It was rumoured in June 1702 that Dunch would be created a baron of England. Gossip also asserted in April 1704 that his father-in-law Colonel Charles Godfrey would become Cofferer of the Household and that Dunch would succeed Godfrey as Master of the Jewel Office. A third rumour, in 1708, was that Dunch would be made Comptroller of the Household. In fact the reward for his services was the position of Master of the Household to Queen Anne on 6 October 1708. When the comptrollership fell vacant on Sir Thomas Felton's death, in March 1709, Dunch tried for it in vain. He was deprived of the mastership in 1710, but was reappointed on 9 October 1714.

Dunch was a member of the Kit-Kat Club, a dining and gathering point for Whigs supporters and as was the custom of the club his portrait was duly painted and engraved. He also had a reputation as a gambler and bon-vivant and is said to have clipped his fortunes by his gambling.

Dunch died on 31 May 1719 and was buried in the family vault at Little Wittenham Church on 4 June, near Wallingford, in Oxfordshire (then Berkshire), in the village where the family had had their seat for over 170 years.

== Family ==
Many of Edmund's forebears had been parliamentarians, particularly representing Wallingford. William Dunch, auditor to the Mint for Henry VIII and Edward IV, represented Wallingford (1563), and was High Sheriff of Berkshire (1569–1570).

It was William who bought the manor of Little Wittenham in 1552, which was the family seat. His son, Sir Edmund Dunch (1551–1623), represented Wallingford in 1571 and was High Sheriff of Berkshire (1586–1587). His son Sir William Dunch (1578–1611) represented Wallingford in 1603. He married Mary Cromwell in 1599, the daughter of Sir Henry Cromwell and aunt to Oliver Cromwell.

William's brother, Samuel (1592–1666), represented Wallingford in 1620. William's son, Edmund (1603–1678), was Governor of Wallingford Castle, and later became Baron Burnell of East Wittenham, though he lost this title at the Restoration (this being the only title conferred by the Protector and not confirmed by Charles II). He, too, represented Wallingford in 1627 and 1640, and was High Sheriff of Berkshire. Edmund's son Hungerford Dunch (1639–1680) was returned for Wallingford in 1660 but elected to serve for Cricklade. Hungerford's son was this Edmund Dunch (1657–1719).

Dunch had no sons, and was the last Dunch to represent Wallingford. With his death, the male line of this branch of the Dunch family became extinct. He had cut off the entail of the property and left it to his four daughters.

- Catherine died young and unmarried
- Elizabeth married in 1729 Sir George Oxenden, 5th Baronet (1694–1775) (MP for Sandwich 1720–1754)
- Harriet married on 3 April 1735 Robert Montagu, 3rd Duke of Manchester.
- Arabella married on 6 February 1725 Yorkshire politician Edward Thompson. Her fate is told by Lord Hervey, in his Memoirs of the Reign of George II, ii. 346. According to this chronicler she had two children by Sir George Oxenden, and on his account was separated from her husband, and died in childbirth. An elegy to Mrs. Thompson was written by Lady Mary Wortley Montagu, and is printed in her 'Letters' (1861 ed.), ii. 484–5.

Dunch was first cousin twice removed of Oliver Cromwell. His wife, who was one of the beauties commemorated in the Kit-Cat Club verses, was half-sister to the illegitimate children of James II.

== Notes ==
Parliament of England
Preceded by Edward Pleydell; Sir Stephen Fox	Member of Parliament for Cricklade; 1701–1702; With: Sir Stephen Fox	Succeeded by Thomas Richmond Webb; Samuel Barker
Preceded by Thomas Richmond Webb; Samuel Barker	Member of Parliament for Cricklade; 1705–1707; With: Samuel Barker	Succeeded by Parliament of Great Britain
Parliament of Great Britain
Preceded by Parliament of England	Member of Parliament for Cricklade; 1707–1713; With: Samuel Barker 1707–1708; James Vernon the younger 1708–1710; Samuel Robinson 1710–1713	Succeeded by Sir Thomas Reade, Bt; William Gore
Preceded by Craven Peyton; Sir Brian Stapylton, Bt	Member of Parliament for Boroughbridge; 1713–1715; With: Sir Brian Stapylton, Bt	Succeeded by Thomas Wilkinson; Sir Richard Steele
Preceded by Richard Bigg; Thomas Renda	Member of Parliament for Wallingford; 1715–1719; With: William Hucks	Succeeded by William Hucks; Henry Grey
Court offices
Preceded by Sir Thomas Felton, Bt	Master of the Household; 1708–1712	Succeeded by Sir William Pole, Bt
Preceded by Sir William Pole, Bt	Master of the Household; 1714–1719	Succeeded by Conyers Darcy
