= Edmund Webb (MP) =

Edmund Webb (c. 1639 – 13 December 1705) was the member of Parliament for Cricklade for several parliaments from 1679 to 1698, and the member for Ludgershall in 1701 and 1702.

His son John, later John Richmond Webb (1667–1724), who rose to the rank of General in the army, was also returned as an MP and was the builder of Biddesden House near Ludgershall.

Parliament of England
| Preceded by Sir George Hungerford; John Ernle | Member of Parliament for Cricklade; 1679–1689; With: Hungerford Dunch 1661–1679; John Pleydell 1680; William Pleydell 1681–1685; Charles Fox 1685–1689 | Succeeded by Charles Fox; Thomas Freke |
| Preceded by Charles Fox; Thomas Freke | Member of Parliament for Cricklade; 1690–1698; With: Charles Fox | Succeeded by Charles Fox; Edward Pleydell |
| Preceded by John Richmond Webb; Walter Kent | Member of Parliament for Ludgershall; 1701–1705; With: John Richmond Webb | Succeeded by Thomas Powell; Walter Kent |
