= Robert Gordon (MP) =

British landowner and politician

Robert Gordon (1786–1864) was a British landowner and politician.

== Life ==
He was the only son of William Gordon, a West Indies planter, of Auchendolly in Kirkcudbrightshire, and his wife Anna Nash, daughter of Stephen Nash of Bristol, and was educated at Eton College from 1799 to 1803. He entered Lincoln's Inn in 1803, and matriculated at Christ Church, Oxford in 1804, graduating B.A. in 1808 and M.A. in 1824.

Gordon succeeded his father in 1802, inheriting the West Indies plantation, and estates in Sherborne, Dorset and Cricklade, Wiltshire. He was a cornet (1805) and lieutenant (1808) in the Dorset yeomanry and a captain in the Wiltshire yeomanry (1816).

Appointed High Sheriff of Gloucestershire for 1811–12, Gordon served as MP for Wareham from 1812 to 1818. He was then MP for Cricklade from 1818 to 1837 and for New Windsor from 1837 to 1841. He was a commissioner to the Board of Control from 1832 to 1833 and joint secretary from 1833 to 1834 and from 1835 to 1839. He was Financial Secretary to the Treasury from 1839 to 1841.

Gordon died in 1864.

== Family ==
Gordon married his cousin Elizabeth Anne, the daughter of Charles Westley Coxe of Kemble House, Gloucestershire.
