= Cricklade (constituency) =

Parliamentary constituency in the United Kingdom, 1885–1918

Wiltshire, North or Cricklade Division
- Former county constituency for the House of Commons

1885–1918
- Seats: one
- Replaced by: Swindon and partly Chippenham

Cricklade
- Former borough constituency for the House of Commons

1295–1885
- Seats: two

Cricklade was a parliamentary constituency named after the town of Cricklade in Wiltshire.

From 1295 until the general election of 1885, Cricklade was a parliamentary borough, returning two members of parliament (MPs) to the House of Commons of the Parliament of the United Kingdom, previously to the House of Commons of England and House of Commons of Great Britain.

Initially this consisted of only the town of Cricklade, but from 1782 the vote was extended to the surrounding countryside as a punishment for the borough's corruption. The extended area came to include the village of Swindon, which later grew into a large town with the coming of the railways in the 19th century.

From the 1885 general election the borough was abolished, but the name was transferred to a county division of Wiltshire covering much the same area, and electing a single MP. This constituency was abolished for the 1918 general election: Cricklade joined the Chippenham constituency and a new Swindon constituency was created.

== Boundaries ==
1832–1885: The hundreds of Highworth, Cricklade, Staple, Kingsbridge and Malmesbury, except the parliamentary borough of Malmesbury.

1885–1918: The Sessional Divisions of Cricklade and Swindon.

== Members of Parliament ==
=== 1295–1640 ===
- Constituency created 1295

Parliament	First member	Second member
1386	John Andrew	Andrew Jones
1388 (Feb)	John Andrew	Thomas Weston
1388 (Sep)		
1390 (Jan)	?John Crouch	?William Plomer
1399	Robert Andrew	John Ferrour
1413 (May)	Thomas Cricklade	Robert Newman
1421 (Dec)	[Thomas] Cricklade	Geoffrey Cowbridge
1442	John Long	
1427	John Bailey	
1510	Sir Andrew Windsor	
1529	Robert Curzon	William Rede
1547	John Winchcombe alias Smallwood	John Walshe
1553 (Mar)	?	
1553 (Oct)	Thomas Parker	William Badger ?
1554 (Apr)	William Hampshire	John Tunks
1554 (Nov)	Thomas Parker	John Rede
1555	Sir Nicholas Poyntz	George Huntley
1558	William Hampshire	John Marmion
1559	Sir Walter Denys	John Astley
1562–3	Nicholas St John	Anthony Throckmorton
1571	Sir Nicholas Arnold	Giles Brydges
1572	William Brydges	John Higford
1584	Rowland Leigh	Richard Smith
1586	John Higford	Richard Delabere
1588–9	George Snigge	Thomas Smith
1593	Henry Noel	John Pleydell
1597	Sir George Gifford	Grey Brydges
1601	Sir George Gifford	Robert Master
1604–1611	Sir John Hungerford	Sir Henry Poole
1614	Sir Thomas Monson	Sir John Eyre
1621–1622	Sir Thomas Howard	Sir Carew Reynell
1624	Sir William Howard	Sir Neville Poole
1625	Sir William Howard	Edward Dowse
1626	Sir William Howard	Sir Robert Hyde
1628	Robert Jenner	Sir Edward Hungerford
1629–1640	No Parliaments summoned	

=== 1640–1885 ===
Year	First member	First party	Second member	Second party
April 1640	?			
November 1640	Robert Jenner	Parliamentarian	Thomas Hodges	Parliamentarian
December 1648	Jenner excluded in Pride's Purge - seat vacant		Hodges not recorded as having sat after Pride's Purge	
1653	Cricklade was unrepresented in the Barebones Parliament and the First and Second Parliaments of the Protectorate			
January 1659	Edward Poole		John Hawkins	
May 1659	Cricklade was unrepresented in the restored Rump			
April 1660	Hungerford Dunch		Nevil Maskelyne	
1661	Sir George Hungerford		John Ernle	
1679	Hungerford Dunch		Edmund Webb	
1680	John Pleydell		Edmund Webb	
1681	William Lenthall		Edmund Webb	
1685	Charles Fox		Edmund Webb	
1689	Charles Fox		Thomas Freke	
1690	Charles Fox		Edmund Webb	
1698	Charles Fox		Edward Pleydell	
1699	Sir Stephen Fox		Edward Pleydell	
1701	Sir Stephen Fox		Edmund Dunch	Whig
1702	Thomas Richmond Webb		Samuel Barker	
1705	Edmund Dunch	Whig	Samuel Barker	
1708	Edmund Dunch	Whig	James Vernon the younger	Whig
1710	Edmund Dunch	Whig	Samuel Robinson	
1713	Sir Thomas Reade		William Gore	
1714	Sir Thomas Reade		Samuel Robinson	
1715	Sir Thomas Reade		Jacob Sawbridge	
1721	Sir Thomas Reade		Hon. Matthew Ducie Moreton	
1722	Sir Thomas Reade		Thomas Gore	
1727	Sir Thomas Reade		Christopher Tilson	
1734	Sir Thomas Reade		William Gore	
1739	Sir Thomas Reade		Charles Gore	
1741	Sir Thomas Reade		Welbore Ellis	
1747	William Rawlinson Earle		Lieutenant-Colonel John Gore	
1754	William Rawlinson Earle		Thomas Gore	
1761	Arnold Nesbitt		Thomas Gore	
1768	Hon. George Damer		Lieutenant-Colonel Sir Robert Fletcher	
1774	William Earle		Arnold Nesbitt	
1775	Samuel Peach		Arnold Nesbitt	
1776	John Dewar		Arnold Nesbitt	
1779	John Dewar		John Macpherson	
1780	Paul Benfield		John Macpherson	
1782	Paul Benfield		Hon. George St John	
1784	Charles Coxe	Whig	Robert Adamson	Whig
1785	John Walker-Heneage	Tory	Robert Nicholas	Tory
1790	John Walker-Heneage	Tory	Thomas Estcourt	Tory
1794	Henry Herbert	Tory	Thomas Estcourt	Tory
1806	Henry Herbert	Tory	Thomas Goddard	Tory
1811	William Herbert	Tory	Thomas Goddard	Tory
1812	Joseph Pitt	Tory	Thomas Calley	Whig
1818	Joseph Pitt	Tory	Robert Gordon	Whig
1831	Thomas Calley	Whig	Robert Gordon	Whig
1835	John Neeld	Conservative	Robert Gordon	Whig
1837	John Neeld	Conservative	Ambrose Goddard	Conservative
1841	John Neeld	Conservative	Hon. Henry Howard	Whig
1847	John Neeld	Conservative	Ambrose Goddard	Conservative
1859	Anthony Ashley-Cooper	Liberal	Ambrose Goddard	Conservative
1865	Sir Daniel Gooch	Conservative	Ambrose Goddard	Conservative
1868	Sir Daniel Gooch	Conservative	Hon. Frederick Cadogan	Liberal
1874	Sir Daniel Gooch	Conservative	Ambrose Goddard	Conservative
1880	Sir Daniel Gooch	Conservative	Nevil Story Maskelyne	Liberal
1885	Borough abolished - replaced by county constituency returning one member			

=== 1885–1918 ===
Election	Member	Party
1885	Nevil Story Maskelyne	Liberal
1886	Nevil Story Maskelyne	Liberal Unionist
1892	John Husband	Liberal
1895	Alfred Hopkinson	Liberal Unionist
1898	Lord Edmond FitzMaurice	Liberal
1906	John Massie	Liberal
Jan. 1910	Thomas Calley	Liberal Unionist
Dec. 1910	Richard Cornthwaite Lambert	Liberal
1918	constituency abolished: see Swindon	

== Elections ==
=== Elections in the 1830s ===
General election 1830: Cricklade (2 seats)
Party	Candidate	Votes	%	±%
Tory	Joseph Pitt	Unopposed		
Whig	Robert Gordon	Unopposed		
Registered electors		c. 1,200		
Tory hold				
Whig hold				

General election 1831: Cricklade (2 seats)
Party	Candidate	Votes	%	±%
Whig	Robert Gordon	669	36.3	N/A
Whig	Thomas Calley	639	34.7	N/A
Whig	Philip Pleydell-Bouverie	533	29.0	N/A
Majority		106	5.7	N/A
Turnout		1,138	c. 94.8	N/A
Registered electors		c. 1,200		
Whig hold		Swing	N/A	
Whig gain from Tory		Swing	N/A	

Gordon was appointed a Commissioner for the Affairs of India, causing a by-election.

By-election, 16 June 1832: Cricklade
Party	Candidate	Votes	%	±%
Whig	Robert Gordon	Unopposed		
Whig hold				

General election 1832: Cricklade (2 seats)
Party	Candidate	Votes	%	±%
Whig	Robert Gordon	Unopposed		
Whig	Thomas Calley	Unopposed		
Registered electors		1,546		
Whig hold				
Whig hold				

General election 1835: Cricklade (2 seats)
Party	Candidate	Votes	%	±%
Whig	Robert Gordon	Unopposed		
Conservative	John Neeld	Unopposed		
Registered electors		1,640		
Whig hold				
Conservative gain from Whig				

General election 1837: Cricklade (2 seats)
Party	Candidate	Votes	%	±%
Conservative	John Neeld	833	36.4	New
Conservative	Ambrose Goddard (born 1779)	734	32.1	New
Whig	Henry Thomas Howard	720	31.5	N/A
Majority		14	0.6	N/A
Turnout		1,389	82.3	N/A
Registered electors		1,687		
Conservative hold		Swing	N/A	
Conservative gain from Whig		Swing	N/A	

=== Elections in the 1840s ===
General election 1841: Cricklade (2 seats)
Party	Candidate	Votes	%	±%
Whig	Henry Thomas Howard	Unopposed		
Conservative	John Neeld	Unopposed		
Registered electors		1,663		
Whig gain from Conservative				
Conservative hold				

General election 1847: Cricklade (2 seats)
Party	Candidate	Votes	%	±%
Conservative	John Neeld	Unopposed		
Conservative	Ambrose Goddard	Unopposed		
Registered electors		1,659		
Conservative hold				
Conservative gain from Whig				

=== Elections in the 1850s ===
General election 1852: Cricklade (2 seats)
Party	Candidate	Votes	%	±%
Conservative	Ambrose Goddard	Unopposed		
Conservative	John Neeld	Unopposed		
Registered electors		1,647		
Conservative hold				
Conservative hold				

General election 1857: Cricklade (2 seats)
Party	Candidate	Votes	%	±%
Conservative	John Neeld	778	35.7	N/A
Conservative	Ambrose Goddard	770	35.3	N/A
Whig	Charles James Monk	633	29.0	New
Majority		137	6.3	N/A
Turnout		1,407 (est)	83.7 (est)	N/A
Registered electors		1,682		
Conservative hold		Swing	N/A	
Conservative hold		Swing	N/A	

General election 1859: Cricklade (2 seats)
Party	Candidate	Votes	%	±%
Conservative	Ambrose Goddard	745	33.9	−1.4
Liberal	Anthony Ashley-Cooper	743	33.8	+4.8
Conservative	John Neeld	712	32.4	−3.3
Turnout		1,472 (est)	87.0 (est)	+3.3
Registered electors		1,692		
Majority		2	0.1	−6.2
Conservative hold		Swing	−1.9	
Majority		31	1.4	N/A
Liberal gain from Conservative		Swing	+4.8	

=== Elections in the 1860s ===
General election 1865: Cricklade (2 seats)
Party	Candidate	Votes	%	±%
Conservative	Ambrose Goddard	978	37.2	+3.3
Conservative	Daniel Gooch	879	33.4	+1.0
Liberal	William Eliot	772	29.4	−4.4
Majority		107	4.0	+3.9
Turnout		1,701 (est)	83.8 (est)	−3.2
Registered electors		2,029		
Conservative hold		Swing	+2.8	
Conservative gain from Liberal		Swing	+1.6	

General election 1868: Cricklade (2 seats)
Party	Candidate	Votes	%	±%
Liberal	Frederick William Cadogan	2,844	38.9	+9.5
Conservative	Daniel Gooch	2,452	33.6	+0.2
Conservative	Ambrose Goddard	2,009	27.5	−9.7
Majority		835	11.4	N/A
Turnout		5,075 (est)	87.1 (est)	+3.3
Registered electors		5,825		
Liberal gain from Conservative		Swing	+7.3	
Conservative hold		Swing	−2.3	

=== Elections in the 1870s ===
General election 1874: Cricklade (2 seats)
Party	Candidate	Votes	%	±%
Conservative	Daniel Gooch	2,624	29.0	−4.6
Conservative	Ambrose Goddard	2,231	24.6	−2.9
Liberal	Frederick William Cadogan	2,092	23.1	+3.6
Liberal	Henry Tucker	1,578	17.4	−2.1
Lib-Lab	William Morris	497	5.5	N/A
Independent Liberal	John Arkell	40	0.4	New
Majority		139	1.5	N/A
Turnout		4,800 (est)	75.9 (est)	−11.2
Registered electors		6,325		
Conservative hold		Swing	−4.1	
Conservative gain from Liberal		Swing	−0.4	

=== Elections in the 1880s ===
General election 1880: Cricklade (2 seats)
Party	Candidate	Votes	%	±%
Liberal	Nevil Story Maskelyne	4,350	50.9	+10.4
Conservative	Daniel Gooch	2,441	28.6	−0.4
Conservative	Algernon Neeld	1,748	20.5	−4.1
Majority		2,602	30.4	N/A
Turnout		6,791 (est)	90.9 (est)	+15.0
Registered electors		7,473		
Liberal gain from Conservative		Swing	+7.3	
Conservative hold		Swing	N/A	

General election 1885: Cricklade
Party	Candidate	Votes	%	±%
Liberal	Nevil Story Maskelyne	4,541	62.1	+11.2
Conservative	William Stone	2,770	37.9	−11.2
Majority		1,771	24.2	−6.2
Turnout		7,311	81.0	−9.9 (est)
Registered electors		9,031		
Liberal hold		Swing	+11.2	

General election 1886: Cricklade
Party	Candidate	Votes	%	±%
Liberal Unionist	Nevil Story Maskelyne	3,401	53.7	+15.8
Liberal	Benjamin Francis Conn Costelloe	1,683	26.6	−35.5
Independent Liberal	Sir John Bennett	1,247	19.7	New
Majority		1,718	27.1	N/A
Turnout		6,331	70.1	−10.9
Registered electors		9,031		
Liberal Unionist gain from Liberal		Swing	+25.7	

- Costelloe contested previous general election as Conservative

=== Elections in the 1890s ===
General election 1892: Cricklade
Party	Candidate	Votes	%	±%
Liberal	John Husband	4,569	56.1	+29.5
Liberal Unionist	Nevil Story Maskelyne	3,571	43.9	−9.8
Majority		998	12.2	N/A
Turnout		8,140	77.1	+7.0
Registered electors		10,561		
Liberal gain from Liberal Unionist		Swing	+19.7	

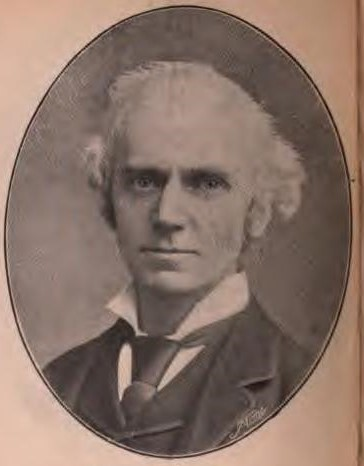
Alfred Hopkinson

General election 1895: Cricklade
Party	Candidate	Votes	%	±%
Liberal Unionist	Alfred Hopkinson	4,679	50.5	+6.6
Liberal	Edmond Petty-Fitzmaurice	4,580	49.5	−6.6
Majority		99	1.0	N/A
Turnout		9,259	84.2	+7.1
Registered electors		10,994		
Liberal Unionist gain from Liberal		Swing	+6.6	

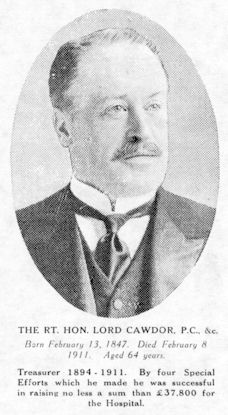
Viscount Emlyn

1898 Cricklade by-election
Party	Candidate	Votes	%	±%
Liberal	Edmond Petty-Fitzmaurice	5,624	52.3	+2.8
Conservative	Frederick Campbell	5,135	47.7	−2.8
Majority		489	4.6	N/A
Turnout		10,759	90.3	+6.1
Registered electors		11,911		
Liberal gain from Liberal Unionist		Swing	+2.8	

=== Elections in the 1900s ===
Arnold Ward

General election 1900: Cricklade
Party	Candidate	Votes	%	±%
Liberal	Edmond Petty-Fitzmaurice	5,754	53.9	+4.4
Conservative	Ernest St Clair Pemberton	4,920	46.1	−4.4
Majority		834	7.8	N/A
Turnout		10,674	85.8	+1.6
Registered electors		12,441		
Liberal gain from Liberal Unionist		Swing	+4.4	

John Massie

General election 1906: Cricklade
Party	Candidate	Votes	%	±%
Liberal	John Massie	7,294	56.1	+2.2
Conservative	Arnold Ward	5,716	43.9	−2.2
Majority		1,578	12.2	+4.4
Turnout		13,010	90.4	+4.6
Registered electors		14,390		
Liberal hold		Swing	+2.2	

=== Elections in the 1910s ===
Thomas Calley

General election January 1910: Cricklade
Party	Candidate	Votes	%	±%
Liberal Unionist	Thomas Calley	7,389	52.2	+8.3
Liberal	John Massie	6,754	47.8	−8.3
Majority		635	4.4	N/A
Turnout		14,143	93.0	+2.6
Liberal Unionist gain from Liberal		Swing	+8.3	

R.C. Lambert

General election December 1910: Cricklade
Party	Candidate	Votes	%	±%
Liberal	Richard Cornthwaite Lambert	6,937	50.5	+2.7
Liberal Unionist	Thomas Calley	6,809	49.5	−2.7
Majority		128	1.0	N/A
Turnout		13,746	90.4	−2.6
Liberal gain from Liberal Unionist		Swing	+2.7	

General Election 1914–15:

Another General Election was required to take place before the end of 1915. The political parties had been making preparations for an election to take place and by July 1914, the following candidates had been selected;

- Liberal: Richard Cornthwaite Lambert
- Unionist:
