= Thomas Estcourt (died 1818) =

English politician (1748–1818)

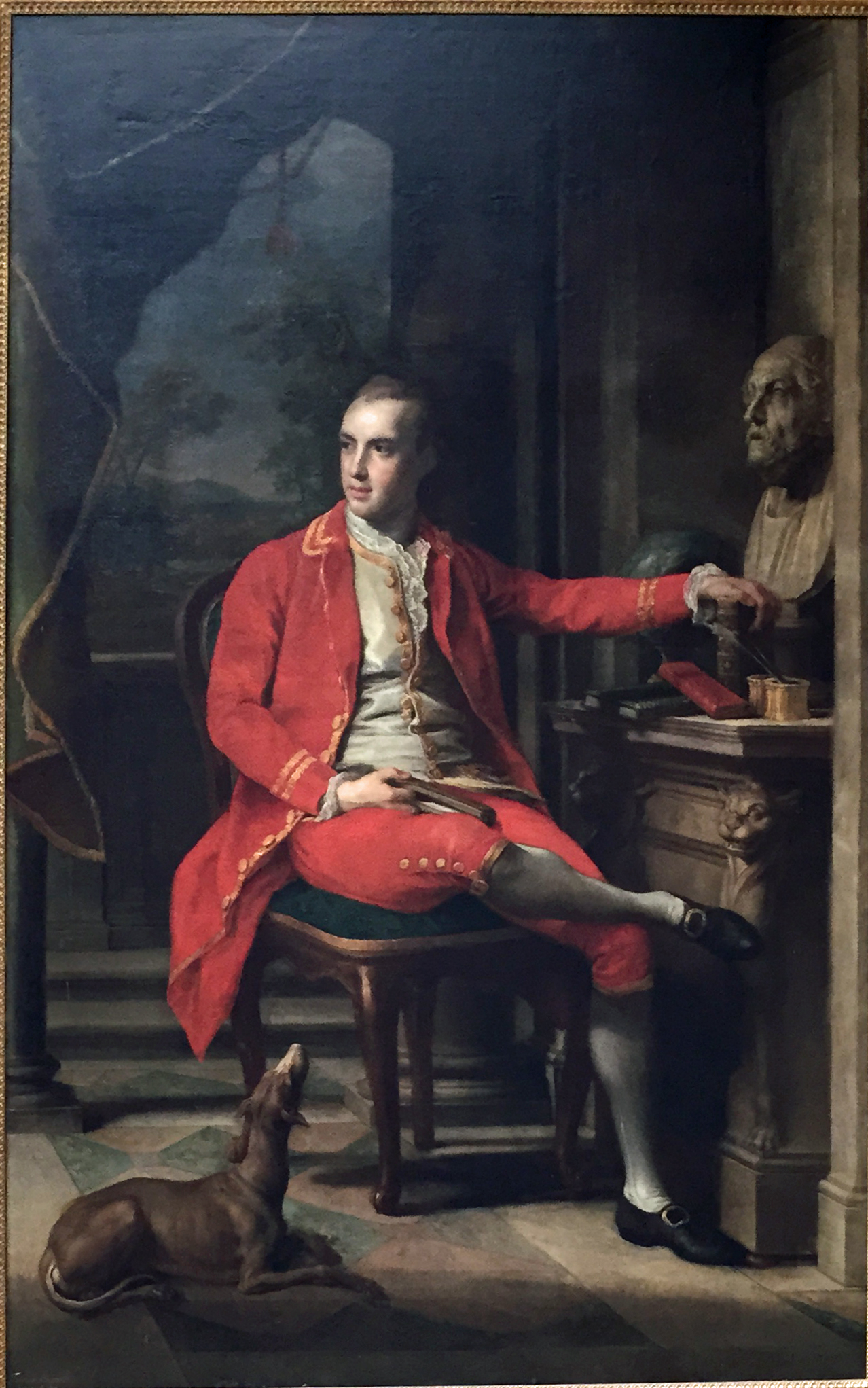
- Thomas Estcourt, 1772 by Pompeo Batoni

Member of Parliament
- In office 1790–1806 Serving with John Walker-Heneage (1790–1794); Henry Herbert (1794–1806)
- Preceded by: John Walker-Heneage; Robert Nicholas
- Succeeded by: Henry Herbert; Thomas Goddard
- Constituency: Cricklade

High Sheriff of Gloucestershire
- In office 1774–1775

Personal details
- Born: 27 September 1748
- Died: 2 December 1818 (aged 70)
- Citizenship: Great Britain (till 1801); United Kingdom (since 1801)
- Spouse: Jane Grimston (m. 1774)
- Children: Thomas Grimston Estcourt; Harriet Jane Bucknall Estcourt; Charlotte Estcourt; Edmund William Estcourt
- Parents: Matthew Estcourt (father); Esther Halling (mother)
- Relatives: James Grimston (father-in-law)
- Education: St John's College, Oxford

Thomas Estcourt (27 September 1748 – 2 December 1818) was an English politician.

He was born in 1748, the eldest surviving son of Matthew Estcourt of Cam, Gloucestershire, and his wife, Lydiah. He was educated at St John's College, Oxford, from 1766.

He succeeded to the Estcourt estate of a distant kinsman in 1750 and then his father before 1782. He was High Sheriff of Gloucestershire for 1774–75.

He was returned unopposed as MP for Cricklade from 20 March 1790 to 1806, promising to serve "founded on independence and guided by integrity".

He married in 1774, the Hon. Jane Grimston, daughter of James Grimston, 2nd Viscount Grimston and had 2 sons and 2 daughters. His eldest son Thomas Grimston Estcourt also became an MP.

Parliament of Great Britain
Preceded by John Walker-Heneage; Robert Nicholas	Member of Parliament for Cricklade; 1760–1800; With: John Walker-Heneage 1790–1794; Henry Herbert 1794–1800	Succeeded by Parliament of the United Kingdom
Parliament of the United Kingdom
Preceded by Parliament of Great Britain	Member of Parliament for Cricklade; 1801–1806; With: Henry Herbert 1801–1806	Succeeded by Henry Herbert; Thomas Goddard
