= John Pleydell =

17th century English politician

John Pleydell (c. 1601 – 1693) was an English politician who sat in the House of Commons between 1660 and 1689.

Pleydell was the son of Sir Charles Pleydell of Midgehall, Wiltshire and Kilburn Priory, Middlesex and his first wife Katherine Bourchier, daughter of Thomas Bourchier of Barnsley, Gloucestershire. He matriculated at Trinity College, Oxford on 6 November 1618, aged 17 and was a student of Inner Temple in 1621. He succeeded his father in 1642.

In 1660, Pleydell was elected Member of Parliament for Wootton Bassett in the Convention Parliament. He was a J.P. for Wiltshire from July 1660 to June 1688 and commissioner for assessment from August 1660 to 1680. In 1661 he was re-elected MP for Wootton Bassett in the Cavalier Parliament. He was commissioner for corporations from 1662 to 1663. In 1675 he was commissioner for recusants. He was re-elected MP for Wootton Bassett in 1679 to the First Exclusion Parliament, and was returned as MP for Cricklade in the Second Exclusion Parliament. He was elected MP for Wootton Bassett again in 1681 and 1685

Pleydell died unmarried at the age of about 92 and was buried at Lydiard Tregoze, Wiltshire on 12 January 1693. He was the brother of William Pleydell.

Parliament of England
Preceded by Not represented in Restored Rump	Member of Parliament for Wootton Bassett; 1660–1679; With: Lord Herbert of Raglan 1660; Sir Baynham Throckmorton 1660; Sir Walter St John 1661–1679; Laurence Hyde 1679	Succeeded by Laurence Hyde; Henry St John
Preceded by Hungerford Dunch; Edmund Webb	Member of Parliament for Cricklade; 1680; With: Edmund Webb	Succeeded by Edmund Webb; William Lenthall
Preceded by Laurence Hyde; Henry St John	Member of Parliament for Wootton Bassett; 1681–1689; With: Henry St John	Succeeded by Henry St John; John Wildman
