= John Burridge (disambiguation) =

John Burridge is a former English footballer

John Burridge may also refer to:

- John Burridge (MP, died 1753) (c. 1681 – 1753), British merchant and politician
- John Burridge (died 1733) (c. 1651 – 1733), English politician
