= Robert Curzon =

Robert Curzon may refer to:

- Robert of Courçon or Robert Curzon (c. 1160/1170 – 1219), English cardinal of the Roman Catholic Church
- Robert Curzon (MP, born 1774) (1774–1863), MP for Clitheroe, 1796–1831
- Robert Curzon, 14th Baron Zouche (1810–1873), British traveller, MP for Clitheroe, 1831–1832
- Robert Curzon (MP, died 1550) (c. 1491–1550), MP for Cricklade

== See also ==
- Robert Curson (1460–1535), medieval bishop
