= George Huntley =

George Huntley may refer to:

- George Huntley (MP) (c. 1512–1580), member of parliament for Cricklade
- George Huntley (musician), American singer, guitarist, and songwriter
- G. P. Huntley, stage actor
- G. P. Huntley Jr., film actor
