= Robert Nicholas =

Robert Nicholas may refer to:

- Robert Nicholas (MP for Cricklade) (1758–1826), English member of parliament
- Robert Nicholas (judge) (1595–1667), English judge and member of parliament for Devizes
- Robert Carter Nicholas Sr. (1728/9–1780), Virginia politician and judge
- Robert C. Nicholas (1787–1856), U.S. senator from Louisiana
- Robert C. Nicholas (New York politician) (1801–1854), New York politician
- Bob Nicholas (born 1957), American politician
