= Thomas Cricklade =

Member of the Parliament of England

Thomas Cricklade or Crekkelade (died c. 1449) was the member of Parliament for Cricklade for the parliaments of May 1413, December 1421, and 1422. He was also the member for Calne in 1426.
