= Thomas Freke (1660–1721) =

English Whig politician

Thomas Freke (17 January 1660 – 1721), of Hannington, Wiltshire, was an English Whig politician who sat in the English and British House of Commons between 1685 and 1710.

Freke was the eldest son of Thomas Freke of Hinton St. Mary, Dorset and his second wife Elizabeth Clarke, daughter of Sir William Clarke of Ford Place, Wrotham, Kent. He matriculated at Wadham College, Oxford on 19 March 1675, aged 15 and was also admitted at the Middle Temple in 1675. He married Elizabeth Pile, the daughter and coheiress of Thomas Pile of Baverstock, Wiltshire on 10 October 1683. He succeeded his great-uncle to Hannington Hall in 1684.

Freke was returned as Member of Parliament for Cricklade in a double return at the 1685 English general election and was allowed to sit until 10 June 1685 when it was resolved against him. At the 1689 English general election he was defeated in the poll at Cricklade, but was seated on petition on 5 April 1689. He was returned as MP for Weymouth and Melcombe Regis at a by election on 22 May 1691 and was returned again at the 1698 English general election. He declined to stand in 1701 for various reasons, including the disruption to his domestic life. Later, in 1701, his wife inherited the Shroton estates of another Thomas Freke and he took up residence there. He was undecided where to stand for Parliament again until the 1705 English general election when he was returned unopposed as MP for Lyme Regis. He voted for the Court candidate for Speaker on 25 October 1705. He was returned as a Whig for Lyme Regis in a contest at the 1708 British general election. He voted for the naturalization of the Palatines in 1709 and for the impeachment of Dr Sacheverell in 1710. He retired from Parliament at the 1710 British general election.

Freke's wife, Elizabeth, died in 1714, and he married as his second wife, in December 1718, Mary Corbett. He died without issue in 1721 and the Hannington estate passed to his brother William, the Socinian author.

Parliament of England
Preceded by Charles Fox; Edmund Webb	Member of Parliament for Cricklade; 1685; With: Charles Fox; Edmund Webb	Succeeded by Charles Fox; Edmund Webb
Preceded by Charles Fox; Edmund Webb	Member of Parliament for Cricklade; 1689–1690; With: Charles Fox	Succeeded by Charles Fox; Edmund Webb
Preceded by Sir John Morton, Bt; Michael Harvey; Henry Henning; Nicholas Gould	Member of Parliament for Weymouth and Melcombe Regis; 1691–1700; With: Michael Harvey; Henry Henning 1691-1695; Sir John Morton, Bt 1691-1695; Maurice Ashley 1695-1698; John Knight 1695-1698; Philip Taylor 1698-1700; Arthur Shallett 1698-1700	Succeeded by The Hon. Henry Thynne; Maurice Ashley; Michael Harvey; Charles Churchill
Preceded by Henry Henley; John Burridge	Member of Parliament for Lyme regis 1705–1707; With: John Burridge	Succeeded by Parliament of Great Britain
Parliament of Great Britain
Preceded by Parliament of England	Member of Parliament for Lyme Regis; 1707–1710; With: John Burridge	Succeeded by Henry Henley; John Burridge, junior
