= George Gifford (died 1613) =

English politician (1552–1613)

Sir George Gifford (1552 – June 1613) was the member of Parliament for Morpeth in 1584 and Cricklade in the parliaments of 1597 and 1601.
