= William Nicholas (officer) =

British Army officer (1785–1812)

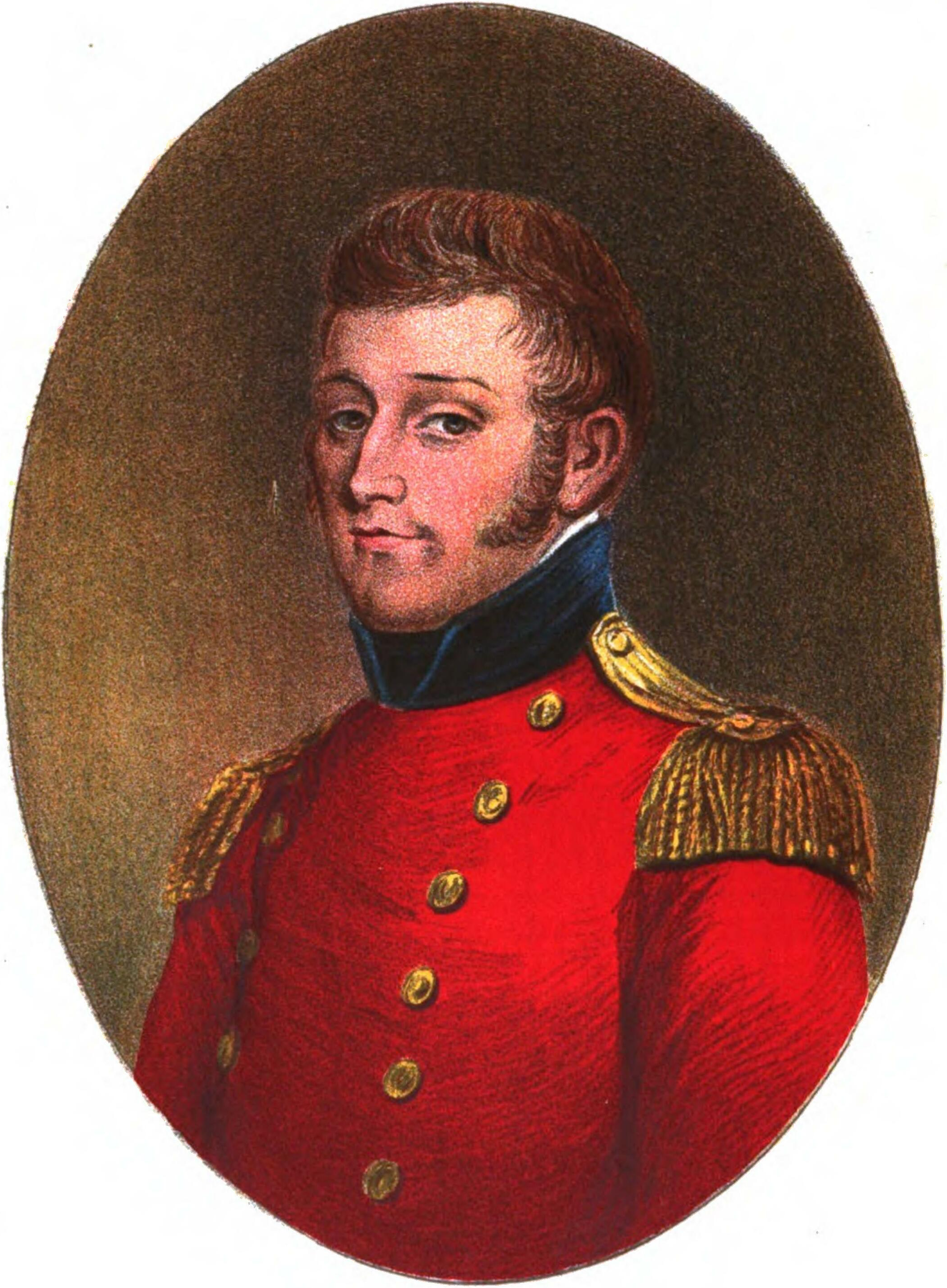
- From a drawing by B. Pym engraved by E. Scriven
- Born: 12 December 1785; Ashton Keynes, Wiltshire, England
- Died: 14 April 1812 (aged 26); Badajoz, Spain
- Military career
- Allegiance: United Kingdom
- Service: British Army; Royal Engineers
- Service years: 1801–1812
- Rank: Bvt. Major
- Conflicts: War of the Third Coalition; Invasion of Naples; Battle of Maida; Anglo-Turkish War; Alexandria expedition (WIA); Peninsular War; Battle of Alcanitz; Siege of Cádiz; Battle of Barossa; Third Siege of Badajos (DOW)

William Nicholas (12 December 1785 – 14 April 1812) was an English officer and military engineer in the British Army. From 1806 to 1812, he was engaged in eleven sieges and battles in Italy, Egypt, and Spain, and died of wounds.

William, third son of Robert Nicholas, by Charlotte, née Frankland, was born at Ashton Keynes, Wiltshire, in 1785. Educated at a private school at Hackney, and admitted to the Royal Military Academy, Woolwich, in 1799, he obtained a commission in the Royal Engineers in 1801, became first lieutenant in 1802, and worked on the naval defences at Dover until 1805.

In 1806, he followed the expedition to Sicily, fought at Maida, took part in the capture of Scylla, and was promoted second captain. In 1807, in the Egyptian campaign, he distinguished himself at Rosetta by assisting to carry the wounded General Meade to safety. In 1808, he took part in the defence of Scylla, and was mentioned in despatches. He also made a report on the western country of Sicily which was highly approved. In 1809, he was sent on a mission to the Spanish army in Spain, and served with General Blake's army at Alcanitz. He went to England at the end of 1809 to regain his health.

In 1810, he was sent to Cádiz as second engineer officer of the defence, and on the death of Major Lefebure at Matagorda he succeeded to the command of the Engineers at Cádiz. He distinguished himself at Barrosa in 1811, and was publicly thanked on the field by Sir Thomas Graham. In 1812, at Badajoz, he made considerable efforts to move men into the Santa Maria breach. Leading at least two charges, he was four times wounded. He was shot again leading a third charge and had to be dragged from the field to receive treatment. He died eight days later, with the brevet rank of major conferred upon him.

== Early life ==
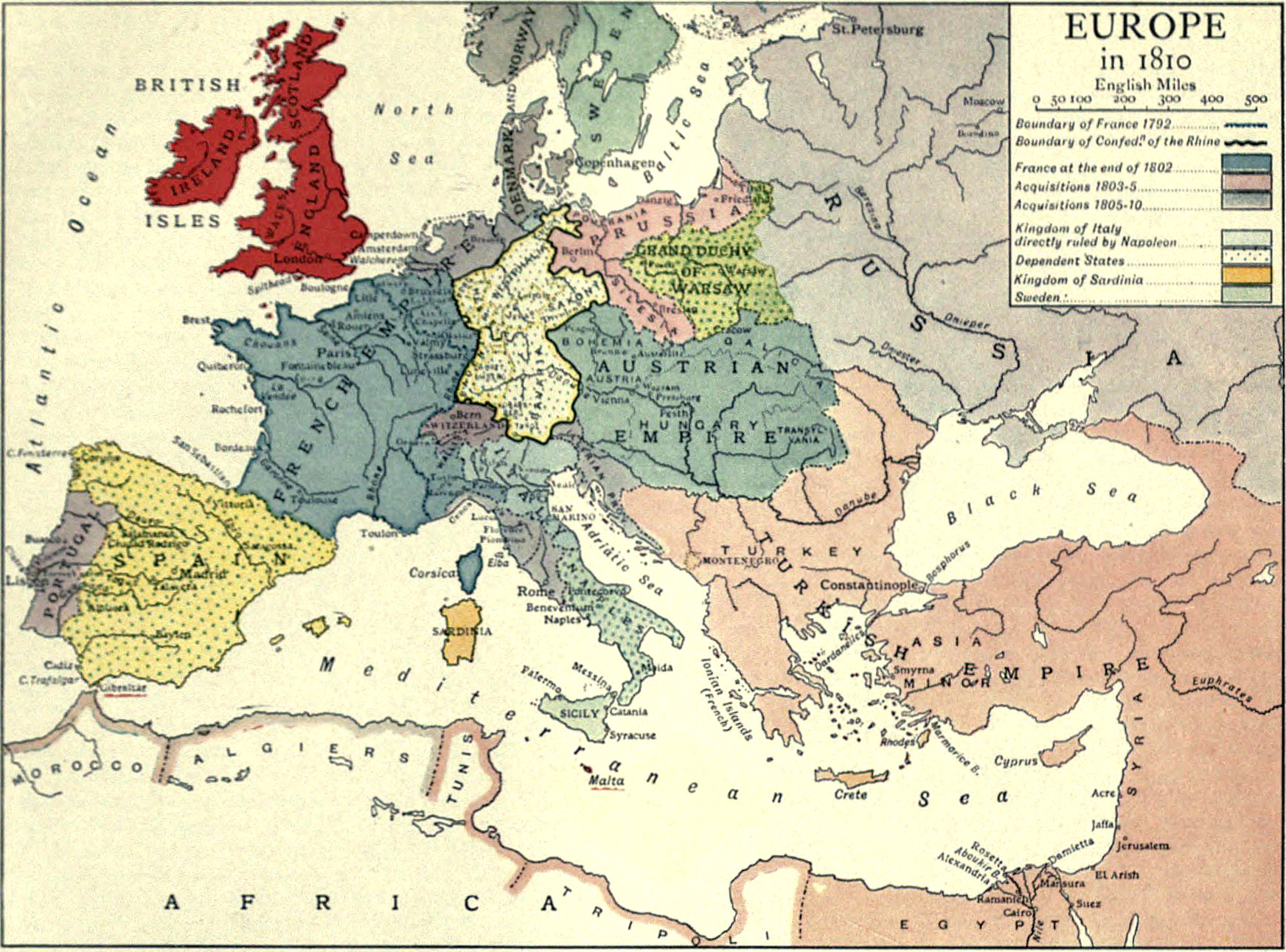
Europe in 1810

William Nicholas was born at Ashton Keynes, near Cricklade, in Wiltshire, on 12 December 1785. He was the third son of Robert Nicholas, Esquire, at one time Member of Parliament for Cricklade, and many years chairman of the board of excise, by Charlotte, sixth daughter of Admiral Sir Thomas Frankland, Baronet. On his father's side, he was collaterally related to Sir Edward Nicholas, principal secretary of state to Charles I and Charles II; and on his mother's was lineally descended from Cromwell.

Nicholas was schooled at Mr. Newcome's establishment at Hackney, and was admitted, upon the nomination of the Marquess Cornwallis, a cadet of the Royal Military Academy, Woolwich at the end of 1799. He obtained a commission as second lieutenant in the Royal Engineers in 1801, and became first lieutenant on 1 July 1802. After completing the usual course of instruction at Chatham he was employed on the defences of Dover, during the formation of the great works upon the Western Heights, between 1801 and 1805.

== Overseas service ==
=== Italy ===
French map of Sicily, Calabria and Sardinia, 1807

In the spring of 1806, Nicholas was ordered to serve in the expedition to Sicily to oppose the French invasion of Naples. He was engaged at St. Euphemia, and at the Battle of Maida, where he was the assistant quartermaster-general, and, by his own account, narrowly avoided death. His boat-cloak, strapped on behind him, was blown away by a cannon-ball and he was thrown from his horse. He describes it in a letter from Monteleone in Calabria, 11 July 1806:

I had the most narrow escape of any; a cannon-ball carried away my large boat-cloak and pad, which was strapped on behind my saddle, which by the shock was thrown on one side; and my horse, rearing and plunging, threw me on the ground; however no accident happened but the loss of my cloak. A few inches more must have carried away the whole of my hind quarters; but the shot (of small calibre) passing through the cloak, which was very large, and lined with green baize, lost its effect in going by me. Had my cloak not been there, I should have been disabled. The shot only passing so near my body was sufficient to destroy me.

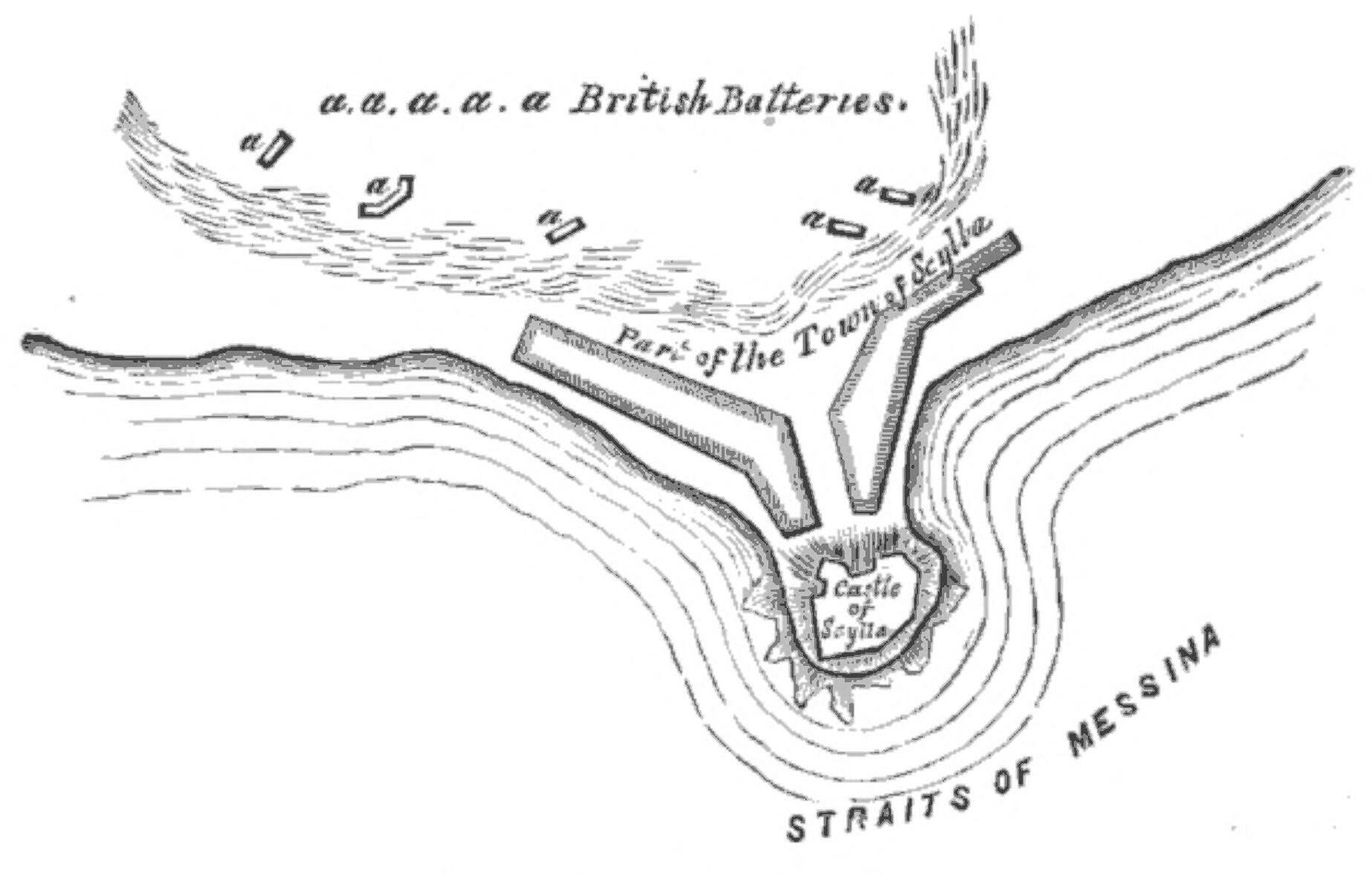
Plan of the attack on the Castle of Scylla, July 1806

He took part in the capture of the fortress of Scylla in July 1806. Of the siege he wrote, "nobody can judge of the fatigue who was not experienced it … at first starting, I was 20 hours without moving off the batteries, beginning the 2d p. m. one day, working all night and till 12 next day; up at 3 next morning, working till 3 in the afternoon, and so on." Soon afterwards he was selected by General Sir John Moore, to accompany him and Lieutenant-colonel Banbury on a tour of Sicily. He was promoted second captain on 25 August 1806.

=== Egypt ===
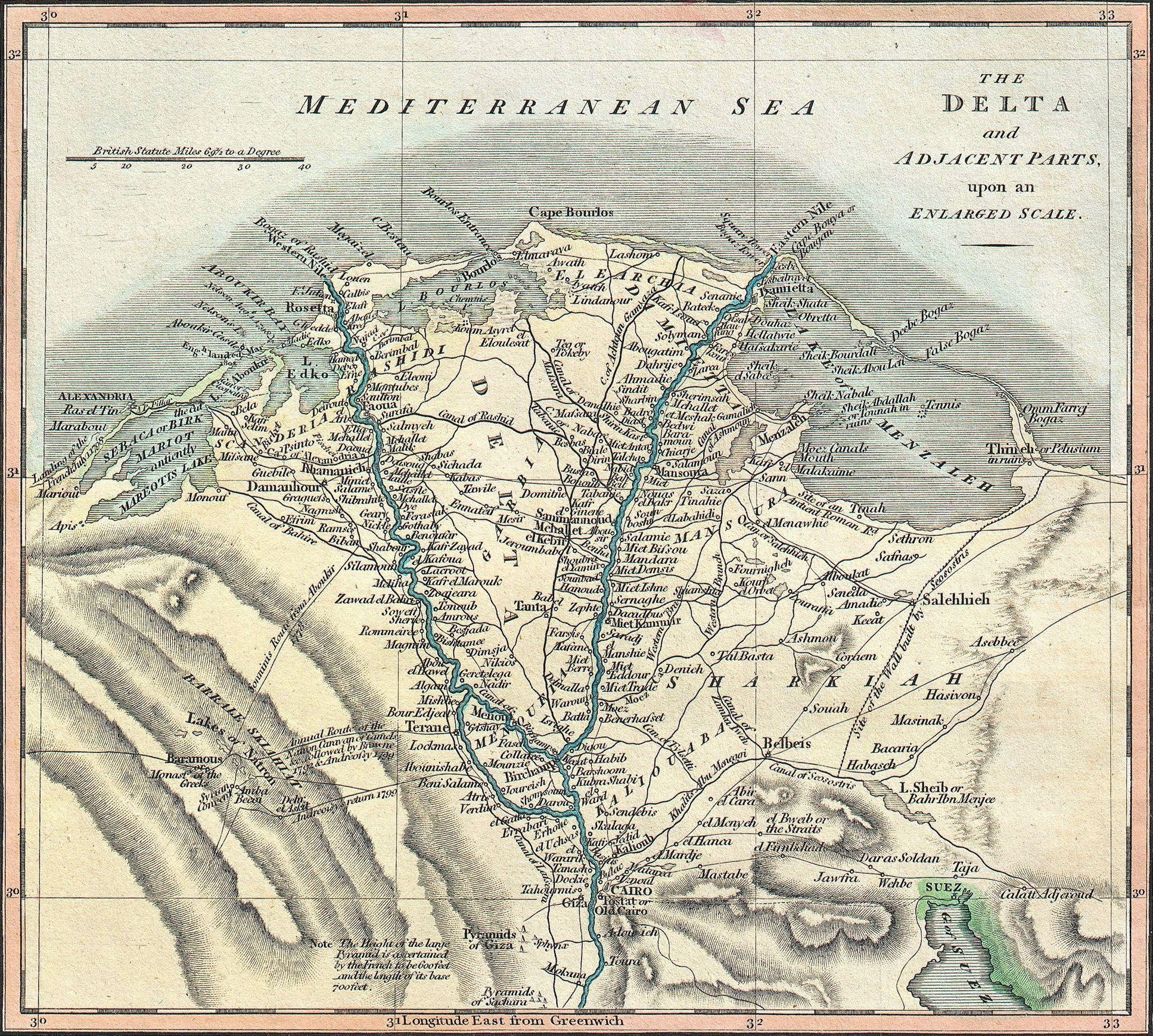
The Delta of Egypt, 1805

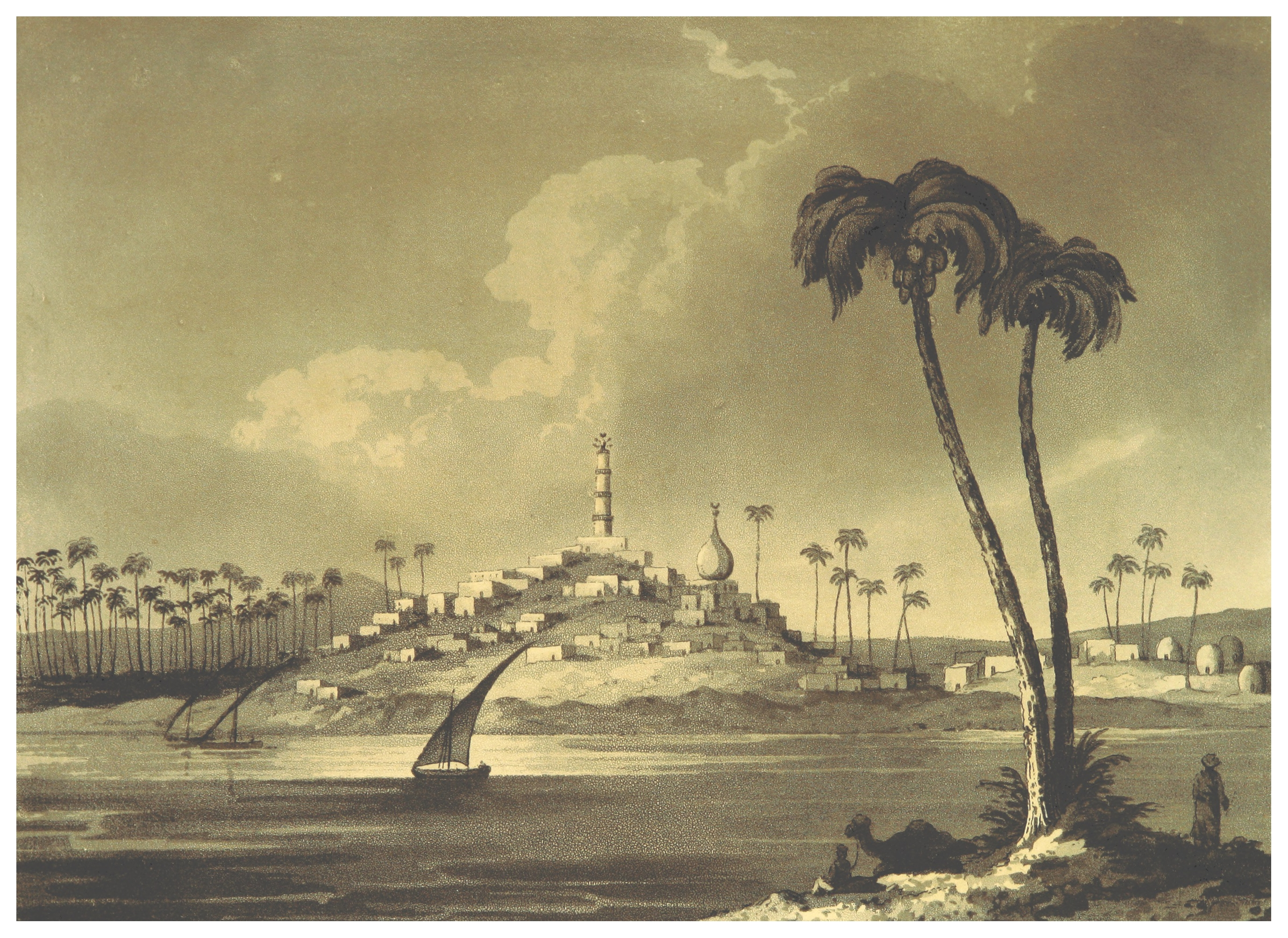
View of Rosetta on the Nile, 1803

On his return from Sicily he accompanied the expedition to Egypt in 1807, and on 26 March wrote from Alexandria: "We landed on the 16th with 1,100 men to the west of Alexandria. In the night of the 18th stormed the Turkish outworks and intrenchments and drove them within their walls. They came out to capitulate on the 21st. We entered on the 22d. Had we had all our force, we should have taken every thing by storm with the bayonet that night. The remainder of the army landed and came up to us after the capitulation. We had therefore all the honour. … The first seven days I never pulled off my clothes or changed my linen, and lived on the soldier's ration."

He also served at the two actions at Rosetta. Nicholas went with the force under Major-General Wauchope for the first attack. The town was promptly assaulted, but not taken, Wauchope being killed. In a latter dated 31 April Nicholas describes the fighting, although he does not mention the incident which was remembered years later by General Robert Meade: when Meade was dangerously wounded in the eye, Nicholas, assisted by Captain James, bore him in their arms out of the bloodshed in the streets of Rosetta, and placed him on the camel which carried him to Alexandria. In the general retreat towards the sea and Alexandria, Nicholas notes how those left behind were "barbarously butchered by the Turks, whose cavalry came out and deliberately cut off the heads of our poor helpless comrades."

Meanwhile, in Alexandria, another detachment of the army, rather stronger, was then sent to renew the attempt; the force was ordered to proceed with a strong force of artillery, to destroy the town with "shot and shell". It was not Nicholas's turn to accompany this party, but he specially applied to be sent, on the ground of knowing the place, and so was permitted to go. He writes, "We made batteries innumerable; but the difficulty of bringing shot and shells from Alexandria prevented our keeping up so hot a fire as we could wish. We continued in this position before the town from March 22nd to April 21st, the Turks making sorties and annoying us with shot and shell daily during the whole time." Much of the British infantry was cut to pieces by the Turkish cavalry, and the force again withdrew to Alexandria in defeat.

=== Return to Italy ===
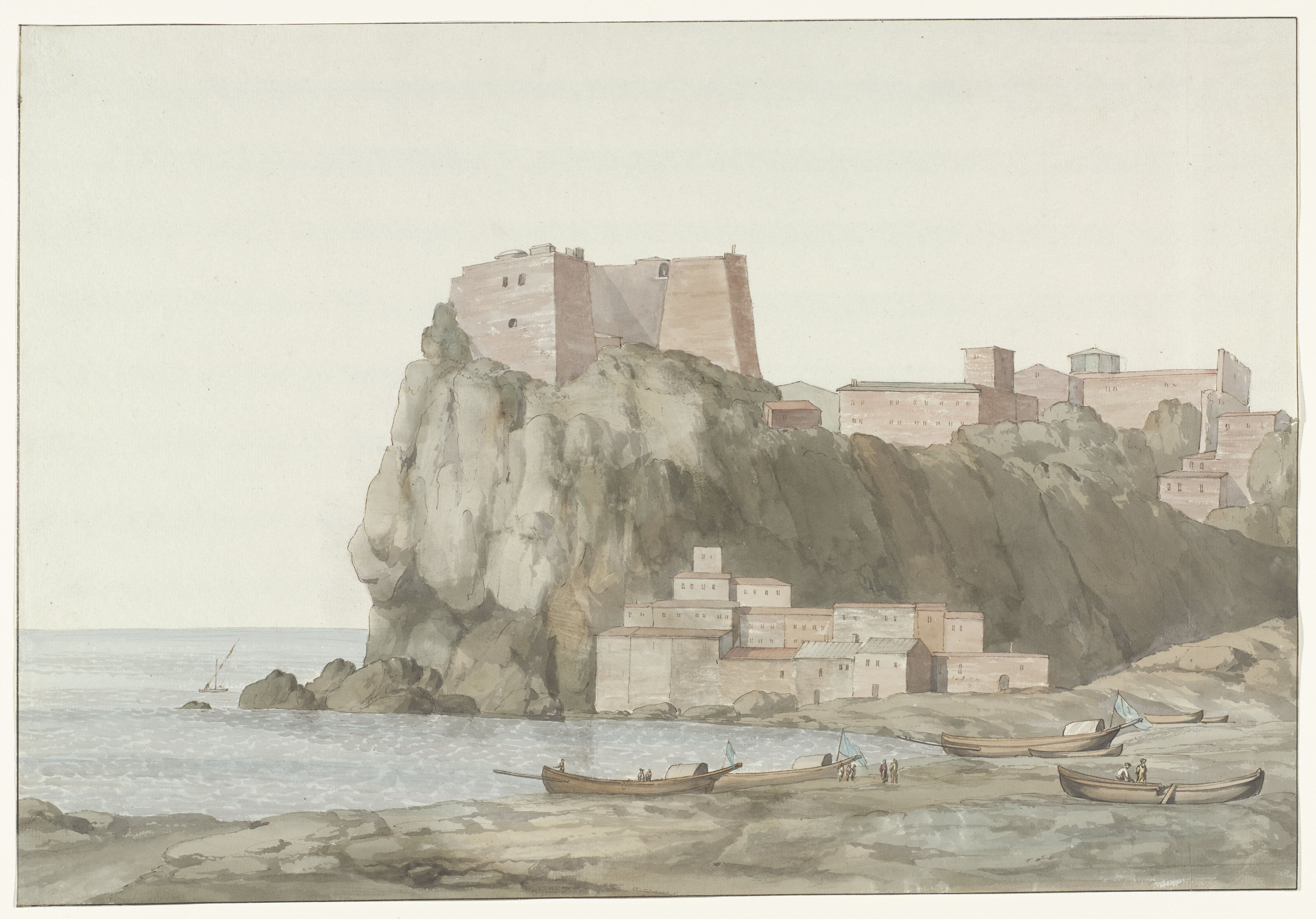
The Rock of Scylla, 1778

Nicholas was seriously ill on leaving Alexandria, from an injury received on his left breast by jumping into shallow water head first and striking upon a hidden rock. His breathing and lungs were affected, and his surgeon, Mr. Fitzpatrick, who had attended him for nearly three years, dreaded a rapid decline, as he could not raise his voice above a low whisper, and was so weak that the least irritation threw him into fits. The heat of the climate had previously much weakened him, but during the voyage from Egypt to Sicily, by care and attention he recovered.

He was mentioned in despatches in February 1808 for his services in the defence of Scylla. In that despatch, Colonel Robertson, in describing the obstacles which the British opposed to the French by cutting across the paths leading to the heights of Milia down to Scylla, writes, "This work, as well as the levelling fences, &c. proceeded rapidly and effectually under the direction of Captain Nicholas."

He was with Colonel Robertson at the attack of Bagnara, where the French voltigeurs of the 22nd or 23rd Light Infantry suffered heavy casualties. For this action he was again favourably mentioned in the letter of service to General Sherbrooke, on which he observes,

my staff position gives me those opportunities, which otherwise would not offer themselves was I doing the duty only of my own immediate profession. I think I shall continue to prosper. Fortune seems to decide in my favour. I lost nothing by going to Egypt; on the contrary saw some active and bloody service; … I know I could never become a totally idle man, either in the country or in London. The life of a Bond-street Buck, or a country Sportsman, would, I suspect, little suit my habits, formed as they have been to military activity, and constant employment; … I have always been seeking credit and reputation; and when I shall be debarred of such pursuits, I know not … to what I could for a constancy turn my thoughts.

He made a tour of the principal towns, and the country in the western part of, Sicily, and his report was forwarded by General Sherbrooke to the secretary of state for the war department. This report was at the time highly approved, and established his reputation.

=== Spain ===
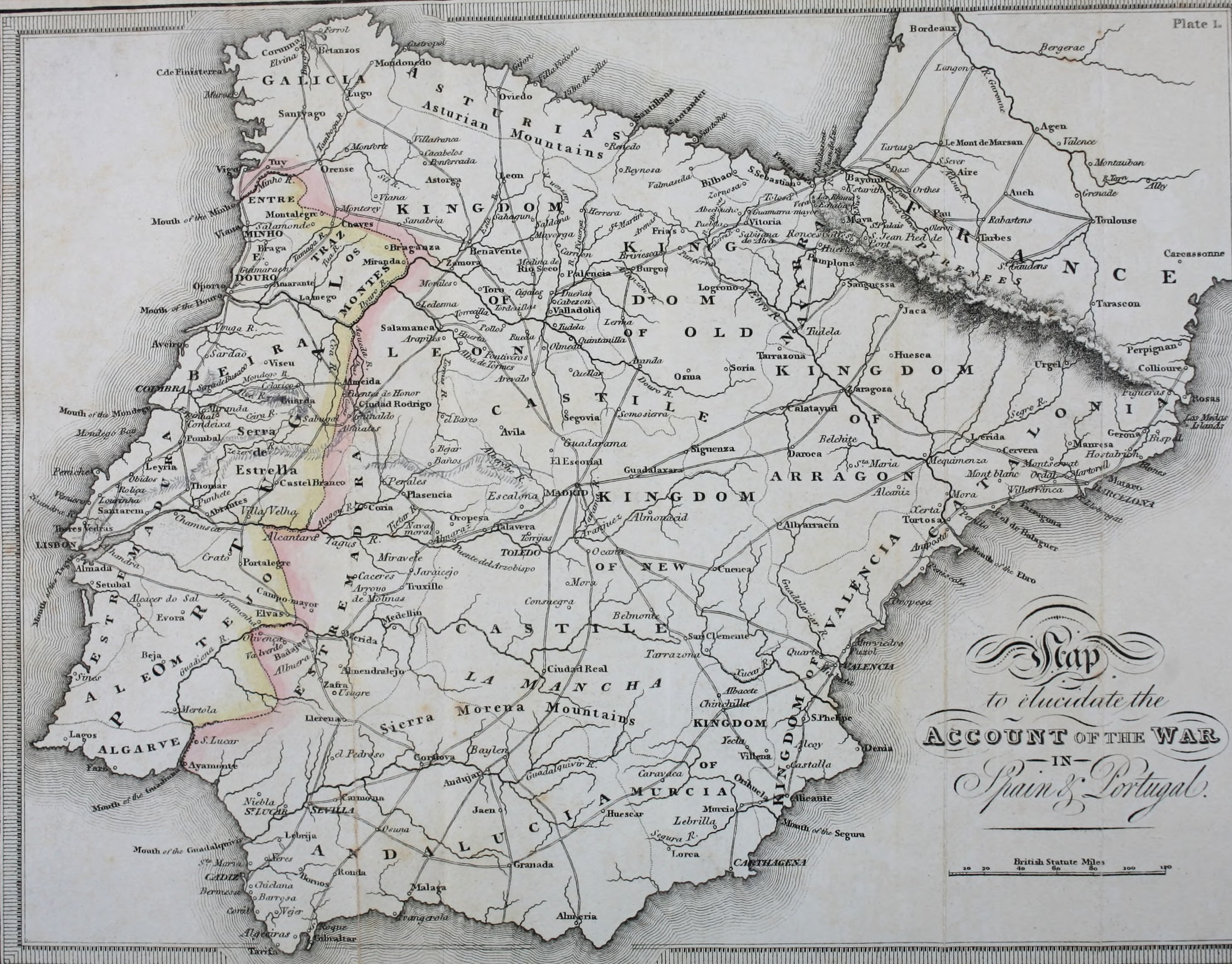
Spain, Portugal, and the South of France, 1808–1814

In the following year, 1809, he was sent by Sir John Stuart on a very confidential mission to the Spanish army in Spain. On 20 May, he joined General Joaquín Blake's army at Alcanitz in Arragon, and did good service in the battle there. He went back to Sicily, and not long after joined the British army at Ischia, on the capture of the island. He went to England at the end of 1809 to recover health, as he still suffered from the blow in the chest he had received in the fighting at Alexandria.

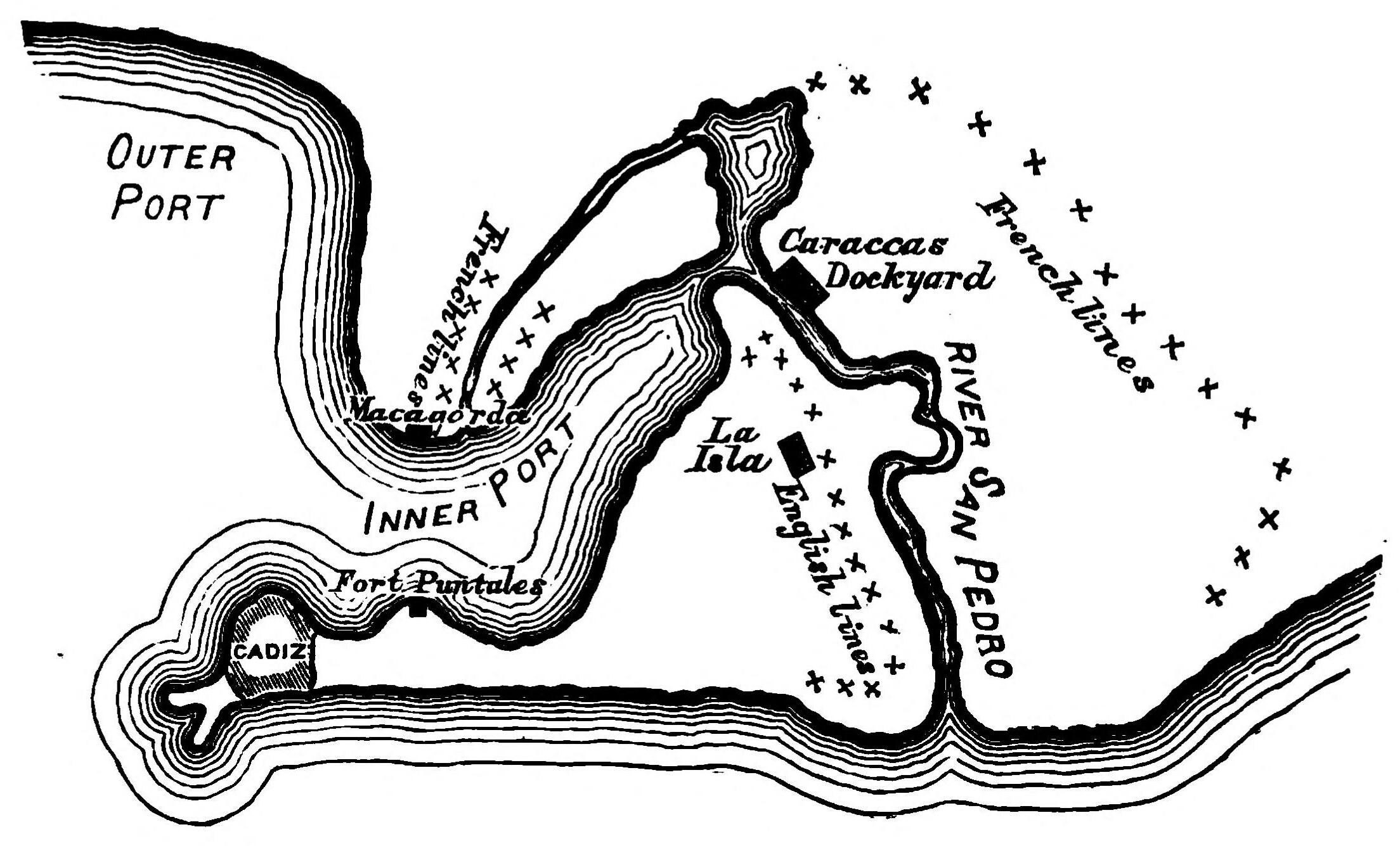
Plan of Cádiz, Matagorda Fortress, and La Isla, c. 1810

In March 1810, he received an order to embark as the second Engineer officer for the defence of Cádiz. At the very close of the defence, Major Charles Lefebure, the commanding Royal Engineer, had his head taken off by a round shot whilst inspecting the enemy's works from over the crest of the parapet. He was succeeded in the command by Captain J. F. Birch. Captain Burgoyne makes the following allusion in his journal to the death of Lefebure:

May 18th, 1810. By a note from Nicholas, at Cádiz, it appears they have not yet done much; there is so much ceremony and form with the Spaniards, who do not show a great desire to assist them. Poor Lefebure was the last man in Fort Matagorda, and was in the act of preparing the mine to blow up what remained of it, when a cannon shot struck his chest.

15 June. Birch lies very ill of the Walcheren fever at Cádiz. Landmann is also laid up there. Nicholas is consequently the senior Engineer there officiating. The most advanced of our batteries there is 1,600 yards on the road to Seville beyond the bridge over the Rio de San Pedro. The Engineers are employed in forming a chain of redoubts to cover La Isla.

At La Isla, in October 1810, Nicholas received an order to take charge of the Engineer department during the absence of Captain Birch, who had gone to Cádiz to recover his health. His exertions for the defence of the place received the approbation of Sir Thomas Graham and Sir Henry Wellesley. Whilst reconnoitring the marshy stations, he was frequently obliged to strip, and swim from bank to bank, through the dykes, and was often up to his knees in mud and water.

In the beginning of 1811, he received intelligence of the death of his next brother, Lieutenant Thomas Nicholas, wrecked in the Satellite, at night, off the coast of France in December 1810; his elder brother, Captain Robert Nicholas, had been wrecked off St. Domingo in the Lark during a white squall in 1809. In March 1811, he took part in the Battle of Barrosa, and with Captain Birch was publicly thanked on the battlefield by Graham, who, holding out his hands to them, said: "There are no two officers in the army to whom I am more indebted than to you two; you have shown yourselves as fine fellows in the field as at your redoubts."

=== Death ===
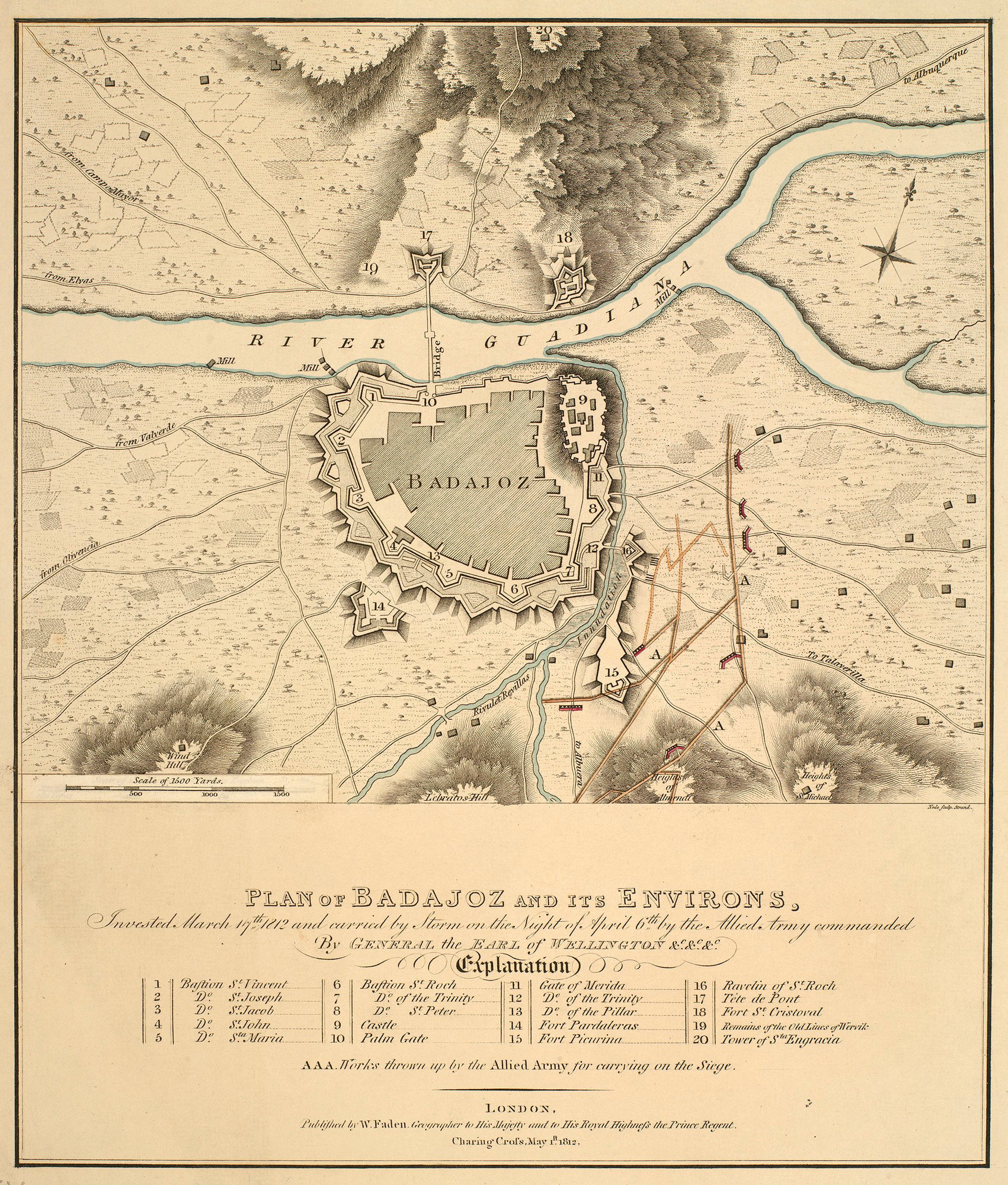
Map of the Siege of Badajoz, 1812

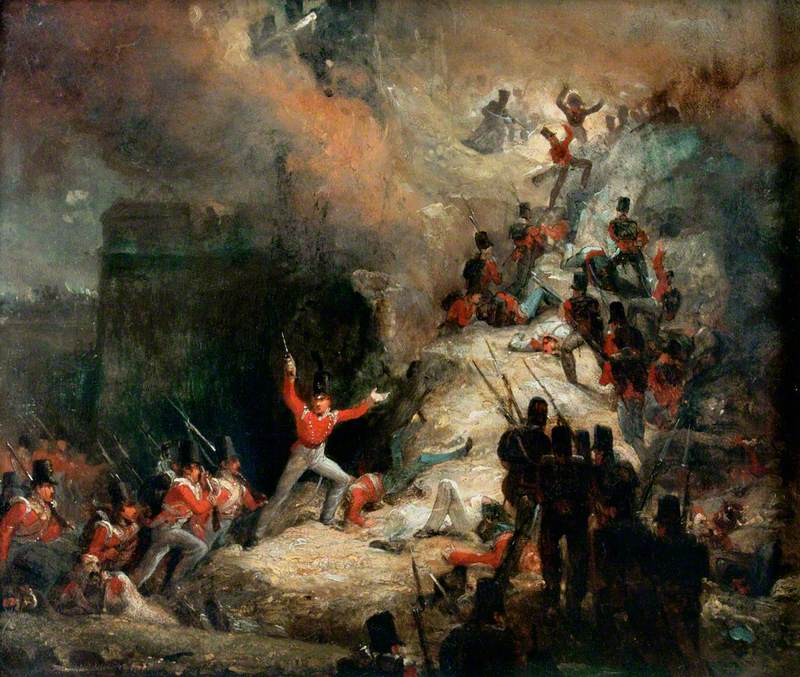
Lieutenant Colonel Macleod at Badajoz, by J. A. Atkinson

On 13 February 1812, Nicholas left Cádiz for Elvas, and took part in the third and last Siege of Badajoz. On the night before the siege of 6 April 1812, having volunteered to reconnoitre, he stripped, and crossed the artificial lake to the east of Badajoz, known as the inundation, and ascertained the safest passage for the column. To him was confided the task of leading the troops of the advance to the great breach. Nicholas and Lieutenant Emmett worked to lead men of the 4th Division into the Santa Maria breach amid the chaos and confusion, and Nicholas was observed by Lieutenant Shaw, of the 43rd, making incredible efforts to force his way with few men into the Santa Maria bastion. He led at least two rushes with small numbers of men, trying to reach the top, but was each time repulsed. He was wounded at least four times: by a musket-ball in his knee-pan, and by a bayonet thrust in the great muscle of his right leg; his left arm was broken and his wrist wounded by a musket-shot. Then, on seeing Lieutenant-colonel Macleod and Captain James fall, and hearing the soldiers ask who was to lead them, he led a third onset with some seventy men, ordering two of them to carry him up the breach. One of his supporters was killed at the top, and Nicholas was shot through the chest, the musket-ball breaking two ribs. This shock propelled him from the top to the bottom of the breach.

Nicholas was eventually carried off the field to receive medical attention as the British took possession of the place. His wounds were hastily dressed by a surgeon of the line, who had no hope of his recovery and gave him some wine as a comfort. It was not discovered where he was by his usual surgeon, Mr. Fitzpatrick, till he had dressed all his other patients. Fitzpatrick first applied himself to elevate the ribs, to assist his breathing; and on the third day after the siege Nicholas was moved from his tent into Badajoz, where he was able to write a letter to his father, dated 7 April. On the same day Lieutenant T. M. Pitts wrote:

Nicholas is wounded in five places and two contusions, one of the wounds through the lungs, and two ribs broke, his left arm broke below the elbow, his left knee touched on the cap, his left calf and right thigh grazed with musket balls. Fitzpatrick says he must die. I am at present nursing him and Emmett, and can only write by bits. The town has been given up to pillage, and thoroughly pillaged it has been. There were ten Engineers in the place; poor Nicholas needs all my care for the short time I fear he has to remain on earth. His father has lost two sons in the Navy, both drowned.

Nicholas died on 14 April, the eighth day after his wounds. Sir Thomas Graham wrote that "no soldier ever distinguished himself more", and his "heroic conduct" could "never be forgotten". Sir Richard Fletcher, the commanding Royal Engineer, placed a monumental stone, with an inscription, over his grave. He had been brevetted major on the receipt of the favourable despatch of the Marquis of Wellesley, but he did not live to know it.

Of the officers of the Royal Engineers who led the storming columns at Badajos three were killed and three wounded; the former being Captain Nicholas and Lieutenants Edward de Salaberry and Thomas Lascelles; those wounded were Captain John Williams, Lieutenants Anthony Emmett and Melhuish.

== Likenesses ==
Lieutenant B. Pymm made a drawing of Nicholas at Cádiz in 1812, engraved by E. Scriven of London and printed with an obituary in the Royal Military Chronicle in February 1813, in which the sitter is shown dressed in the style of uniform worn by officers of the Royal Engineers at that period. In around 1814 the enamel painter Henry Bone also made a pen and ink drawing, after Pymm's original, which is now in the National Portrait Gallery, London.

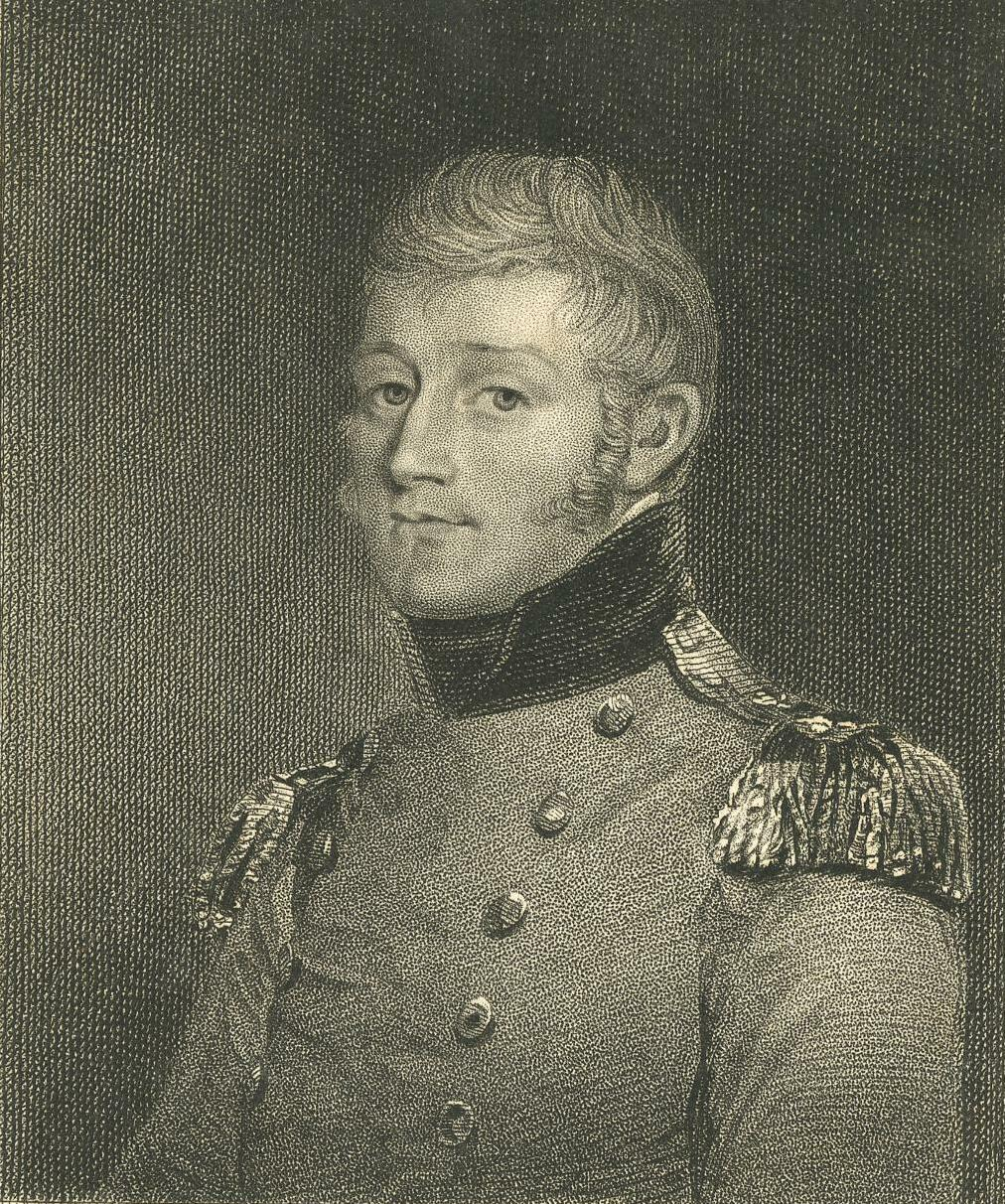
Drawn by Lt. B. Pym at Cádiz, 1812. Engraved by E. Scriven, 1813

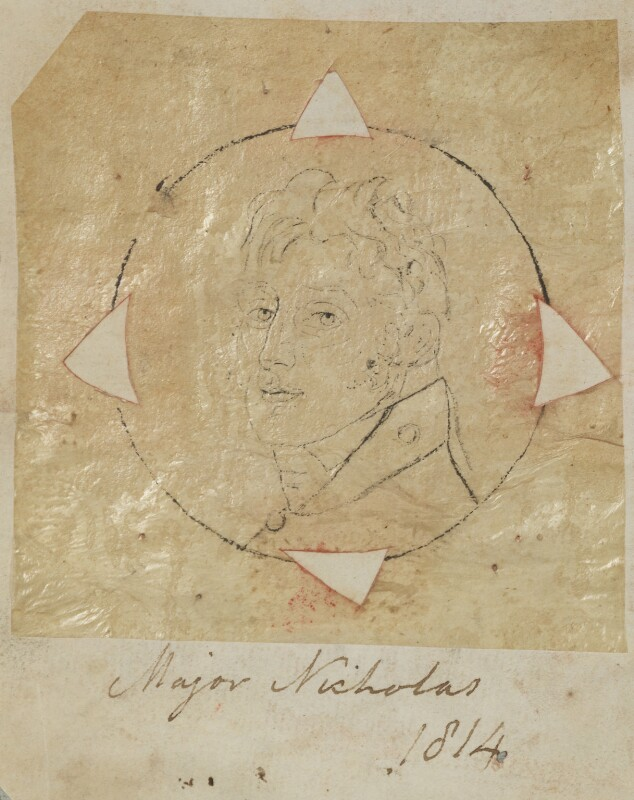
Pen and ink drawing by Henry Bone, after Lieutenant Pymm, 1814

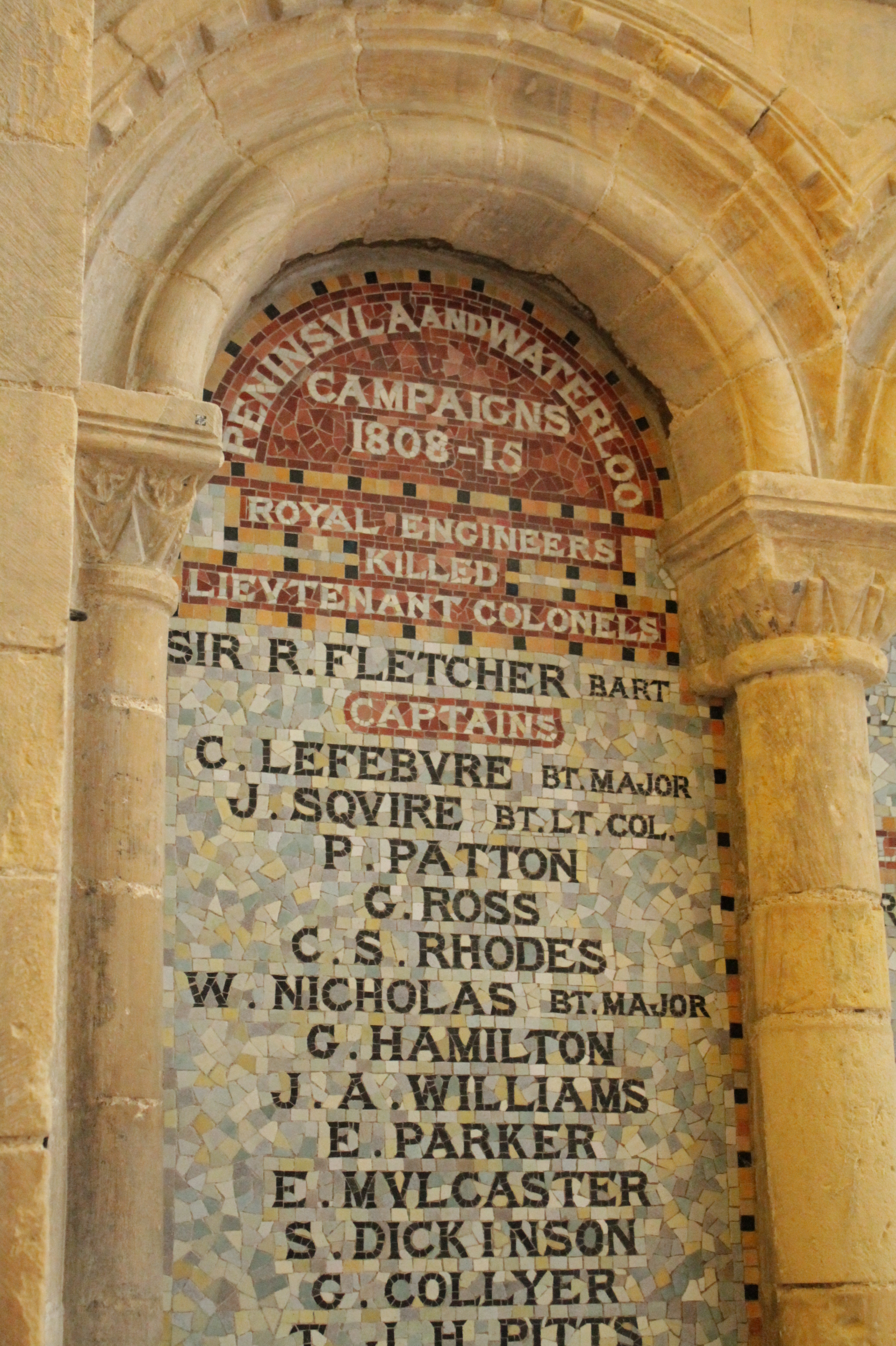
Panel to the losses of the Peninsular War in Rochester Cathedral

== See also ==
- Napoleonic Wars
- Battlefield promotion
- John Fox Burgoyne

== Sources ==
- Grant, James (1891). Adventures of an Aide-de-Camp. London: George Routledge and Sons, Limited. Chapter LV. pp. 209–212.
- Grodzinski, John R. (2010). ""Universally Esteemed By His Brothers In Arms": Lieutenant Edward de Salaberry, R.E. At the Storming of Badajoz, 6 April 1812". Journal of the Society for Army Historical Research, 88(353): pp. 29–37.
- Napier, William Francis Patrick (1851). History of the War in the Peninsula and in the South of France. Vol. 4. New ed. London: Thomas and William Boone. pp. 118–119.
- Porter, Whitworth (1889). History of the Corps of Royal Engineers. Vol. 1. London: Longmans, Green, and Co. pp. 235–237, 269, 270, 272, 296, 305, 308.
- Porter, Whitworth (1889). History of the Corps of Royal Engineers. Vol. 2. London: Longmans, Green, and Co. p. 437.
- Vetch, R. H.; Stearn, Roger T. (2004). "Nicholas, William (1785–1812), army officer". Oxford Dictionary of National Biography (online ed.). Oxford University Press. doi:10.1093/ref:odnb/20103. (Subscription, Wikipedia Library access or UK public library membership required.)
- The Royal Military Chronicle. Vol. 5. February 1813. pp. 251–275.
- "Lieut. Col. Charles Macleod". Imperial War Museums. Retrieved 30 January 2023.
- "Major William Nicholas". National Portrait Gallery. Retrieved 23 February 2023.
- "William Nicholas". The British Museum. Retrieved 24 December 2022.

Attribution:

- This article incorporates text from a publication now in the public domain: Vetch, Robert Hamilton (1894). "Nicholas, William". In Lee, Sidney (ed.). Dictionary of National Biography. Vol. 40. London: Smith, Elder & Co. pp. 433–434.
