= Nevil Story Maskelyne =

English geologist and politician (1823–1911)

Professor Mervyn Herbert Nevil Story Maskelyne
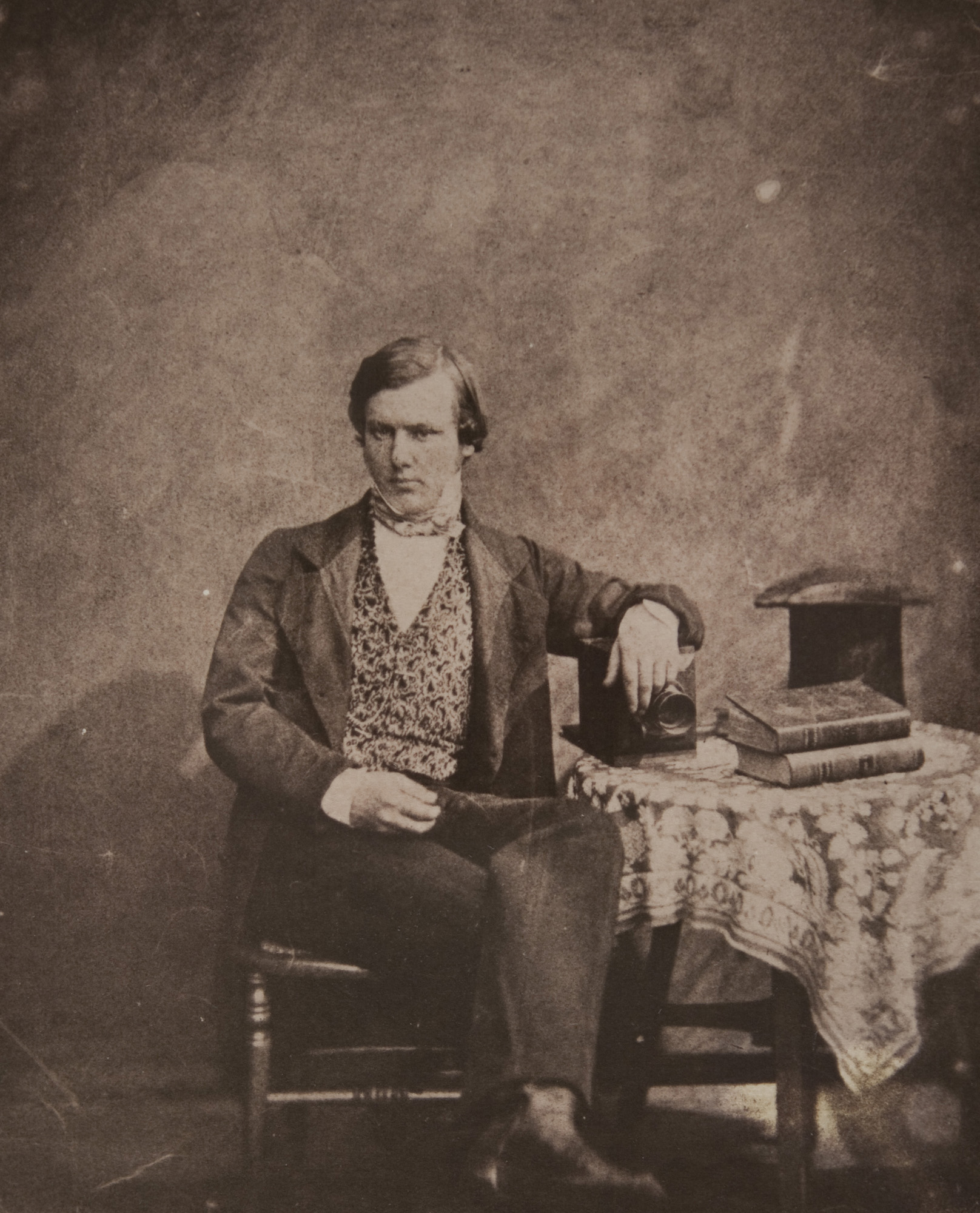
- Portrait of Neville Story-Maskelyne taken by Henry Fox Talbot
- Born: 3 September 1823; Basset Down House, Wroughton, Wiltshire, England
- Died: 20 May 1911 (aged 87); Basset Down House, Wroughton, Wiltshire, England
- Education: Wadham College, Oxford
- Known for: Meteorite classification
- Spouse: Thereza Dillwyn Llewelyn
- Awards: Wollaston Medal (1893); Fellow of Wadham
- Scientific career
- Fields: Mineralogy
- Workplaces: British Museum

Mervyn Herbert Nevil Story Maskelyne (3 September 1823 – 20 May 1911) was an English geologist and politician.

== Scientific career ==
Educated at Wadham College, Oxford, Maskelyne taught mineralogy and chemistry at Oxford from 1851, before becoming a professor of mineralogy, 1856–95. He was Keeper of Minerals at the British Museum from 1857 to 1880. He was made an honorary Fellow of Wadham in 1873.

Maskelyne was also a pioneer of photography and an associate of Fox Talbot.

The meteoritic mineral maskelynite was named after him.

== Family ==
Mervyn was the eldest son of Antony Mervin Reeve Story and Margaret Maskelyne, the daughter of the Astronomer Royal, Nevil Maskelyne. The family adopted the name of Maskelyne on Nevil's coming of age as they had inherited that family's estate at Basset Down in Wiltshire.

Mervyn married Thereza Mary Dillwyn-Llewelyn (1834 – 21 February 1926) - Welsh astronomer and pioneer in scientific photography - on 29 June 1858.

Their daughter Mary married writer and politician Hugh Oakeley Arnold-Forster on 29 July 1885, and Hugh and Mary's granddaughter Vanda Morton published Nevil's biography in 1987 (see references). Their daughter Thereza was an advocate for domestic science who married physicist Arthur William Rucker in 1892.

== Political career ==
He was Member of Parliament (MP) for Cricklade as a Liberal, 1880–1886, and as Liberal Unionist, 1886–1892, and a member of Wiltshire County Council, 1889–1904.

== Selected publications ==
- A guide to the collection of minerals (1862)
- Mineralogical notes (1863)
- Index to the collection of minerals: with references to the table cases in which the species to which they belong are exhibited at the British Museum (1866)
- Mineralogical notices (1871)
- Crystallography: Treatise on the Morphology of Crystals (1895) (Kessinger Publishing January 2008 ISBN 0-548-82536-X)
- Maskelyne, Nevil Story (c. 1863). Catalogue of the Collection of Meteorites exhibited in the Mineral Department of the British Museum. London: Woodfall & Kinder.

== See also ==
- Glossary of meteoritics

Parliament of the United Kingdom
Preceded by Ambrose Lethbridge Goddard; Sir Daniel Gooch	Member of Parliament for Cricklade; 1880 – 1892; With: Sir Daniel Gooch to 1885	Succeeded by John Husband
