= John Tunks =

16th-century English politician

John Tunks was the member of Parliament for Cricklade in the parliament of April 1554.
