= Geoffrey Cowbridge =

Member of the Parliament of England

Geoffrey Cowbridge was the member of Parliament for Cricklade in the Parliament of December 1421.
