= Richard Smith (fl. 1584) =

English politician

Richard Smith (fl. 1584) was an English politician.

He was a member (MP) of the parliament of England for Cricklade in 1584.
