= Nevil Maskelyne (MP) =

Member of the Parliament of England

Nevil Maskelyne (1611 – 30 August 1679) was an English landowner and politician who sat in the House of Commons in 1660.

Maskelyne was the son of Edmund Maskelyne of Purton, Wiltshire, and his wife Catherine Davys, daughter of Richard Davys of Little Mylton, Worcestershire. He was a student of Middle Temple in 1627. On the death of his father in 1630 he succeeded to an estate at Purton, where branches of the Maskelyne family had owned land since the 15th century.

He avoided involvement in the Civil War, and did not hold any office until the eve of the Restoration. He had an interest at Cricklade, four miles from Purton, as lord of the hundred and of the borough. In 1660, he was elected Member of Parliament for Cricklade in the Convention Parliament where he made no speeches and was not named to any committee. He did not stand in 1661. He was awarded the grant of a weekly market and four fairs a year at Cricklade on 18 March 1662, after he reported that he had seized for the king some property of the regicide Sir John Danvers. In 1667 he endowed a parish charity and a Good Friday sermon.

Maskelyne died at the age of about 68 and was buried at Purton; a marble wall monument is inside the church.

He married firstly on 20 September 1630, Jane Norden, daughter of William Norden of Rowde, Wiltshire; they had two sons and a daughter. She died in 1633 (buried on 28 July). He married secondly on 7 September 1635, Sybil Jacob, daughter of Thomas Jacob of Wootton Bassett, Wiltshire, and they had four daughters. She died in 1652 (buried on 30 December).

Parliament of England
Preceded by Not represented in Restored Rump	Member of Parliament for Cricklade; 1660; With: Hungerford Dunch	Succeeded by Sir George Hungerford; John Ernle
