= Robert Nicholas (MP for Cricklade) =

British Member of Parliament (1758–1826)

Member of Parliament for Cricklade
- In office 4 April 1785 – March 1790 Serving with John Walker-Heneage
- Preceded by: Robert Adamson
- Succeeded by: Thomas Estcourt

Personal details
- Born: 22 April 1758
- Died: 27 December 1826 (aged 68)
- Party: Tory
- Spouse(s): Charlotte Frankland (m. 1778) Anne Clarke (m. 1805)
- Children: 17, including William
- Education: The Queen's College, Oxford

Robert Nicholas (22 April 1758 – 27 December 1826) was an English politician.

== Life and career ==
Robert Nicholas was born on 22 April 1758. He was the member of Parliament for Cricklade in Wiltshire from 4 April 1785 to March 1790. He was Commissioner of Excise from 1790 to 1822 and chairman of the Board of Excise from 1802 to 1822. He died on 27 December 1826, aged 68.

== Personal life ==
He married firstly Charlotte Frankland, daughter of Sir Thomas Frankland, 5th Baronet, by whom he had issue 5 sons and 6 daughters. His daughter Harriet Nicholas married another MP. His son William was an officer in the Royal Engineers.

Parliament of the United Kingdom
Preceded by Robert Adamson	Member of Parliament for Cricklade; 1785–1790; Served alongside: John Walker-Heneage	Succeeded by Thomas Estcourt
