= Thomas Weston (MP) =

Member of the Parliament of England

Thomas Weston was the member of Parliament for Cricklade for various parliaments between 1369 and 1388.
