= John Husband =

John Husband (1839 – 5 November 1919) was a British Liberal Party politician who served as Member of Parliament (MP) for Cricklade from 1892 to 1895.

He was elected to the House of Commons at the 1892 general election, defeating the sitting Liberal Unionist MP. Husband did not defend his seat at the 1895 general election, and did not stand for Parliament again.

Parliament of the United Kingdom
| Preceded by Nevil Story Maskelyne | Member of Parliament for Cricklade; 1892–1895 | Succeeded by Alfred Hopkinson |
