= Billingford, Breckland =

Village in Norfolk, England

Coordinates: 52.733°N 0.983°E

Billingford
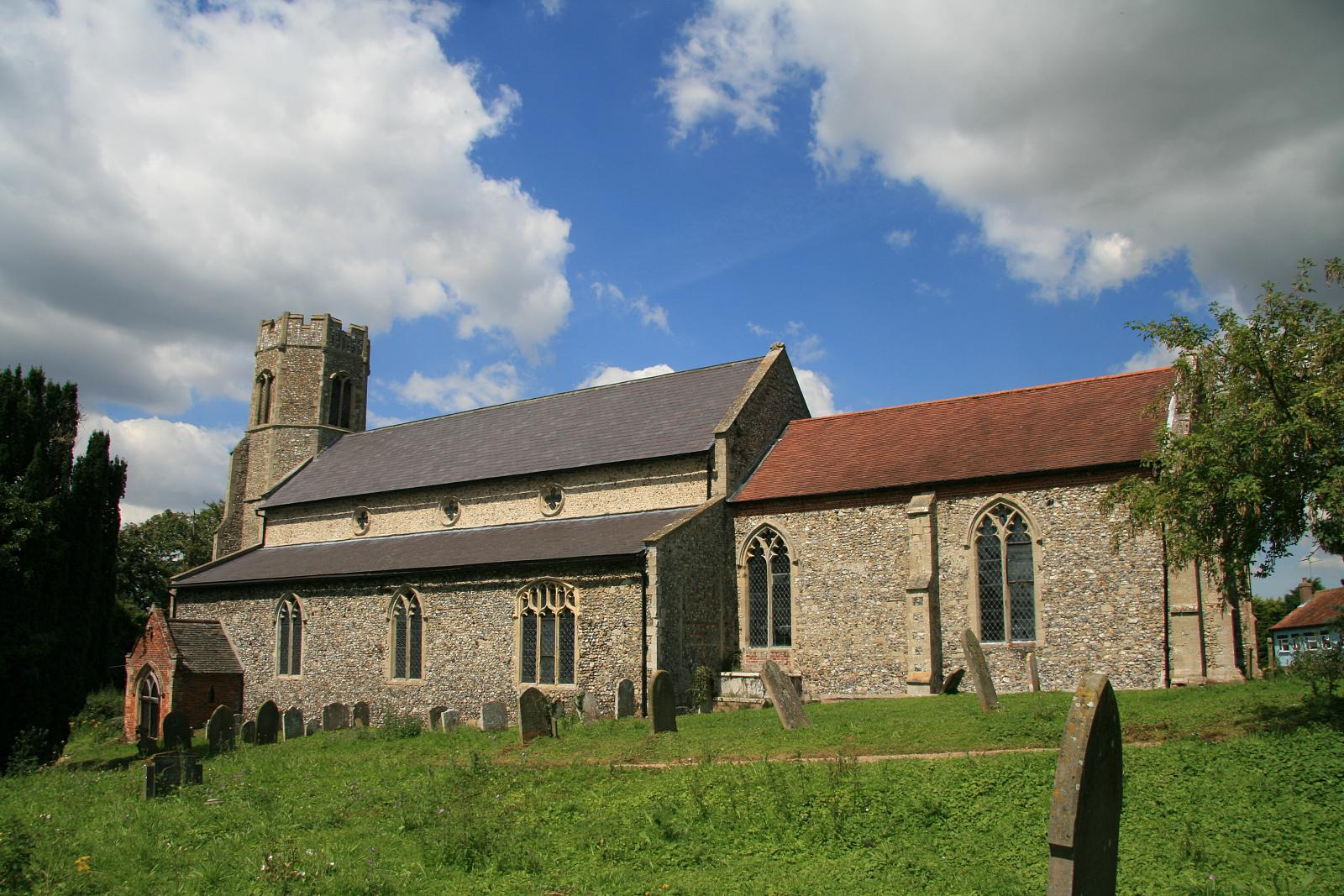
- St Peter's parish church

- Location within Norfolk
- Area: 7.36 km^{2} (2.84 sq mi)
- Population: 253 (2011 Census)
  - Density: 34/km^{2} (88/sq mi)
- OS grid reference: TG014193
- Civil parish: Billingford
- District: Breckland
- Shire county: Norfolk
- Region: East
- Country: England
- Sovereign state: United Kingdom
- Post town: Dereham
- Postcode district: NR20
- Dialling code: 01362
- Police: Norfolk
- Fire: Norfolk
- Ambulance: East of England
- UK Parliament: Mid Norfolk
- Website: Billingford Parish Council

Billingford is a village and civil parish in the English county of Norfolk. It is 2.5 miles (4.0 km) north of Dereham, with the civil parish being approximately 2.84 square miles (7.4 km^{2}) in area.

== History ==
The origin of the name Billingford is Anglo-Saxon. Despite this, Billingford parish shows signs of earlier habitation. Several artefacts from the Neolithic and Bronze Age have been found in Billingford. Furthermore, the Fen Causeway, a Roman road, ran through Billingford which has left many Roman artefacts. This led to excavations along the banks of the River Wensum during the 1990s. It was discovered that there was a significant Roman settlement in Billingford which is today a Scheduled Monument. One of the artefacts uncovered at the site is the golden medallion pictured below.

Billingford is listed in the Domesday Book of 1086 as consisting of 43 households in the hundred of Eynesford. At this time, Billingford was divided between the estates of Alan of Brittany, Ranulf Peverel and Humphrey, son of Aubrey.

Billingford Hall is also located within the village. This manor house was built in the Eighteenth Century and has been Grade II listed since 1984. Within the grounds of the hall is an Eighteenth Century icehouse, which was also Grade II listed in 1984.

== Geography ==
Billingford is located along the northern bank of the River Wensum and straddles the B1145 which runs from King's Lynn and Mundesley.

The 2011 Census recorded the parish population as 253.

== St. Peter's church ==
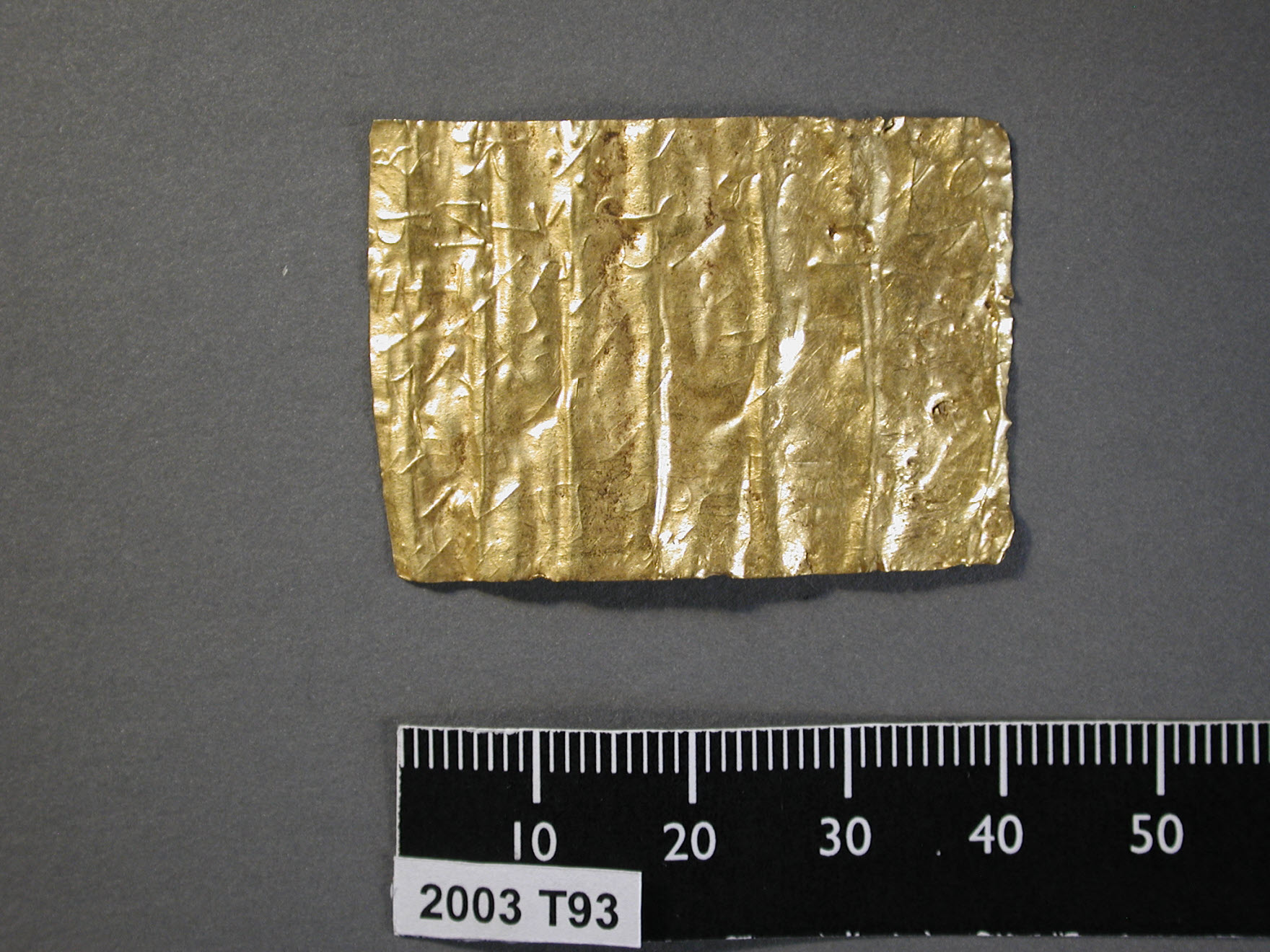
Roman gold amulet found at Billingford

Billingford's parish church is dedicated to Saint Peter and was largely built in the Fourteenth Century. The lectern within the church is shaped like an eagle and originates from the Sixteenth Century. The structure has been Grade I listed since 1960.

Within the grounds of the church there is a Nineteenth Century schoolhouse, which is Grade II listed.

== Governance ==
Billingford is part of the electoral ward of Upper Wensum for local elections and is part of the district of Breckland. At the UK parliament it is part of the Mid Norfolk constituency.

== Notable people ==
- Thomas Anson (1818–1899), cricketer
- Robert Curzon (c. 1491–1550), Member of Parliament
- Gordon Flowerdew (1885–1918), Canadian soldier, recipient of the Victoria Cross
- Peter Parfitt (born 1936), cricketer
- Horatio Walpole (1663–1717), Member of Parliament

== Bibliography ==
- Blomefield, Francis (1808). "Eynford Hundred: Billingford". An Essay Towards A Topographical History of the County of Norfolk. Vol. VIII. London: W Miller. pp. 192–195.
- Ekwall, Eilert (1960) [1936]. Concise Oxford Dictionary of English Place-Names (4th ed.). Oxford: Oxford University Press. Billingford. ISBN 0198691033.
- Lewis, Samuel, ed. (1931) [1848]. A Topographical Dictionary of England. Vol. I (Seventh ed.). London: Samuel Lewis. p. 241.
- Pevsner, Nikolaus (1962). North-East Norfolk and Norwich. The Buildings of England. Vol. 1. Harmondsworth: Penguin Books. p. 88.
