= John Andrew (Cricklade MP) =

14th-century English politician

John Andrew was the member of Parliament for Cricklade in England for various parliaments between 1378 and 1388.
