= John Ferrour =

Member of the Parliament of England

John Ferrour was the member of Parliament for Cricklade in 1399.
