= Thomas Calley (British Army officer) =

British military officer and Liberal Unionist politician

Major-General Thomas Calley CB CBE MVO
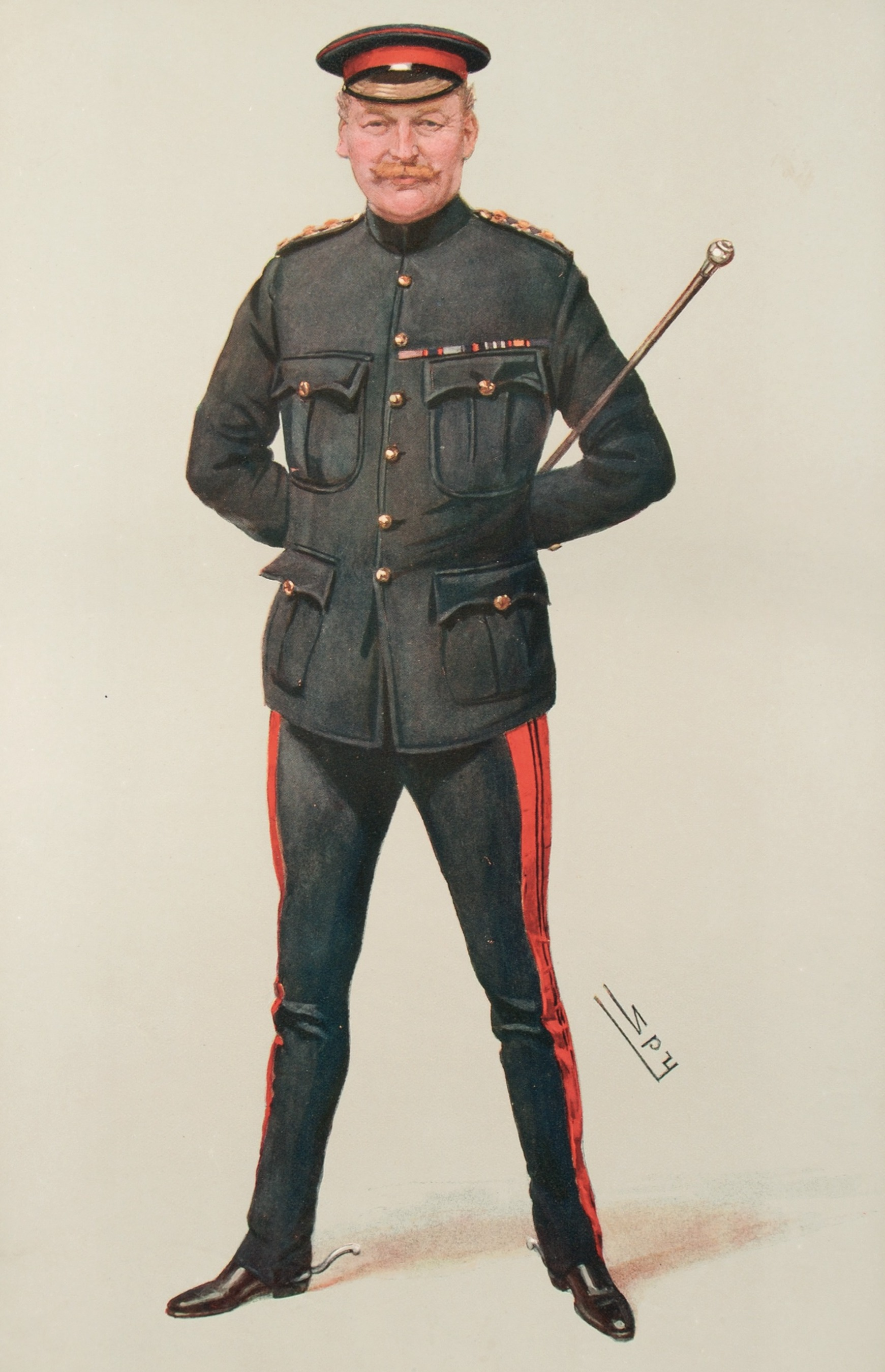
- "1st Life Guards": Calley as caricatured by "Spy" (Leslie Ward) in Vanity Fair, October 1906
- Born: 28 January 1856; Bath, Somerset, England
- Died: 14 February 1932 (aged 76)
- Military career
- Allegiance: United Kingdom
- Branch: British Army
- Rank: Major-General
- Commands: 1st Life Guards; London Mounted Brigade; 60th (2/2nd London) Division
- Conflicts: Second Boer War; First World War
- Awards: Companion of the Order of the Bath; Commander of the Order of the British Empire; Member of the Royal Victorian Order

Major-General Thomas Charles Pleydell Calley CB CBE MVO (28 January 1856 – 14 February 1932) was a British Army officer and Liberal Unionist politician.

== Military career ==
Calley was the son of Henry Calley, JP, DL, of Burderop Park, Wiltshire, and was educated at Harrow School and at Christ Church, Oxford.

He joined the 1st Life Guards in 1876 and served in Egypt in 1882, where he took part in the Battle of Tel el-Kebir. In 1886 he was appointed captain, promoted to major in 1894, lieutenant-colonel in 1898, and a brevet colonel in November 1900 for service in the Second Boer War in South Africa 1899–1900. He was appointed a Member of the Royal Victorian Order (MVO) in July 1901, and served as Silver Stick in Waiting to King Edward VII during his coronation in August 1902. Four months later, he was appointed in command of the 1st Life Guards, serving as such until 1906, during which he was appointed a Companion of the Order of the Bath in 1905. He relinquished command in December 1906 and then went on half-pay. In July 1907 he was promoted to substantive colonel. He went on to become a brigade commander of the London Mounted Brigade from April 1908 until 1912.

He was elected at the January 1910 general election as member of parliament (MP) for Cricklade, winning the seat from the sitting Liberal MP John Massie. However, at the general election in December 1910, he narrowly lost the seat to another Liberal candidate and did not stand for Parliament again.

He was General Officer Commanding 60th (2/2nd London) Division from October 1914, when he was promoted to temporary brigadier general, to December 1915 during the First World War. In September 1917 he was granted the honorary rank of major general.

== Family ==
Calley married, in 1883, Emily Chappell, daughter of T. D. Chappell, of Teddington. They had one daughter.

Parliament of the United Kingdom
| Preceded by John Massie | Member of Parliament for Cricklade; January 1910 – December 1910 | Succeeded by Richard Lambert |
Military offices
| New title | GOC 60th (2/2nd London) Division; 1914–1915 | Succeeded by Edward Bulfin |
