= John Massie =

British politician (1842–1925)

John Massie MP, circa 1906

John Massie (3 December 1842 – 11 November 1925) was a British academic, educationalist and Liberal Party politician who served as Member of Parliament (MP) for Cricklade from 1906 to 1910.

== Education and academic career ==
Massie's initial renown was as a Hebraist and theologian. He was educated at Atherstone Grammar School, Warwickshire, and at St John's College, Cambridge. In 1869 he was appointed Professor of Classics at Spring Hill Theological College in Birmingham, and stayed there for 17 years until the institution was moved to Mansfield College, Oxford, where he was appointed the Yates Professor of New Testament Exegesis. He contributed to both Hastings' Dictionary of the Bible and Encyclopedia Biblica.

== Political career ==
Massie was first elected as a Councillor to Leamington Borough Council in 1878. He was then appointed by the council as an alderman and served until 1887. In 1894 he was elected a member of the Executive of the National Liberal Federation. He sat on that body until he was elected to parliament. Despite not having a financial background he served as national Liberal Party Treasurer from 1903 to 1906. He was a committed supporter of Disestablishmentarianism and was President of the Liberation Society which campaigned for the removal of state patronage and control from schools. He opposed the Unionist Government's Education Act 1902. In protest against the act he passively resisted paying the local education rate. He was elected to the House of Commons at the general election in 1906, but was defeated at the January 1910 general election by the Liberal Unionist candidate Thomas Calley. Massie did not stand for Parliament again. In 1910 he was re-elected to the executive of the National Liberal Federation and sat on that body until his death.

== Theological works ==
- The Century Bible: Corinthians

Parliament of the United Kingdom
Preceded by Edmond Fitzmaurice	Member of Parliament for Cricklade; 1906 – January 1910	Succeeded by Thomas Calley
