= Hungerford Dunch =

English politician (1639–1680)

Hungerford Dunch (20 January 1639 – 9 November 1680) was an English politician who sat in the House of Commons in 1660 and from 1679 to 1680.

== Early life ==
Dunch was born at Down Ampney in Gloucestershire, the son of Edmund Dunch (1602–1678) and his wife Bridget Hungerford, daughter of Anthony Hungerford of Down Ampney (nephew of Anthony Hungerford of Black Bourton in Oxfordshire). In 1678, he inherited the title of de jure Baron Burnell of East Wittenham from his father, although he never used it as it had been created during the Commonwealth.

== Career ==
In 1660, Dunch was elected MP for both Wallingford and Cricklade for the Convention Parliament. He chose to sit for Cricklade for the duration of that parliament. He was an inactive member though he sat on a committee to bring in a bill for the abolition of Court of Wards, through which his family had suffered.

He was made a Knight of the Royal Oak by Charles II. In 1679 Dunch was elected again as MP for Cricklade, and sat in the Habeas Corpus and Exclusion Bill parliaments until his death. In the latter he was appointed to the committee of elections and privileges but was probably inactive and did not vote on the Exclusion Bill.

Dunch died at the age of 41 in London on 9 November 1680, and was buried four days later in Little Wittenham.

== Family ==
Hungerford married Katherine daughter of William Oxton of the City of London. She was buried next to her husband on 26 March 1684. They were the parents of Edmund Dunch (1678–1719), who was also MP for Wallingford.

== Notes ==
Parliament of England
Preceded by Not represented in Restored Rump	Member of Parliament for Cricklade; 1660–1661; With: Nevil Maskelyne	Succeeded by Sir George Hungerford; John Ernle
Preceded by Sir George Hungerford; John Ernle	Member of Parliament for Cricklade; 1679–1680; With: Edmund Webb	Succeeded by John Pleydell; Edmund Webb
