= Thomas Parker (will proved 1558) =

English politician

Thomas Parker (c. 1519 – will proved 1558) was the member of Parliament for Cricklade in the parliaments of October 1553 and November 1554.

Parker was clerk of the treasury and auditor at Gloucester Abbey by 1540; clerk of the crown and of the peace, Gloucester in 1544, and clerk of the peace in 1555–1557. He was commissioner for sewers for Gloucester and Worcestershire in 1554.
