= Andrew Jones (fl. 1386) =

English Member of Parliament

Andrew Jones was the member of Parliament for Cricklade in 1386.
