= John Rede (died 1570) =

English politician

John Rede (c. 1530 – 3 August 1570) was the member of Parliament for Cricklade in the parliament of November 1554.
