= William Hampshire =

16th-century English politician

William Hampshire (c. 1525 – 1558 or later) was the member of Parliament for Cricklade in the parliament of April 1554, Wootton Bassett in November 1554, and Cricklade in 1558.
