= Thomas Hodges (MP for Cricklade) =

Thomas Hodges was the member of Parliament for Cricklade in the parliament of November 1640.
