= George Huntley (MP) =

16th-century English politician

George Huntley (c. 1512 – 31 December 1580) was the member of Parliament for Cricklade in the parliament of 1555.
