= Robert Curzon (MP, died 1550) =

English politician

Robert Curzon (c. 1491–1550) was the member of Parliament for Cricklade in the parliament of 1529.

== Early life ==
Robert Curzon was born by 1491, the second son of Sir Robert Curzon of Beckhall, Billingford, Norfolk by his second wife. He was educated at Lincoln's Inn and called to the bar in 1518.

== Career ==
Curzon was the member of Parliament for Cricklade in the Parliament of 1529.
