= Charles Westley Coxe =

English member of Parliament

Charles Westley Coxe (c. 1754 – 10 March 1806) was the member of Parliament for Cricklade in England from 13 April 1784 to 4 April 1785. No speeches from or votes by Coxe in the House were recorded.

He was the oldest son of Charles Coxe of Kemble, Wiltshire and Elizabeth Westley, daughter and coheir of Sir Robert Westley, Lord Mayor of London, 1744–45. He matriculated at Christ Church, Oxford in 1771, graduating M.A. in 1775. In 1789, he married Anne, daughter of Robert Gordon of Auchendolly, Kirkcudbright, Scotland.
