= John Burridge (died 1733) =

English politician (1651–1733)

Member of Parliament for Lyme Regis
- In office 1689–1695 Serving with Sir John Pole, 3rd Baronet; Henry Henley
- Preceded by: Sir Winston Churchill
- Succeeded by: Robert Henley

Member of Parliament for Lyme Regis
- In office December 1701 – 1710 Serving with Joseph Paice; Henry Henley; Thomas Freke
- Preceded by: Robert Henley
- Succeeded by: John Burridge

Personal details
- Born: circa. 1651 Lyme Regis
- Died: 6 September 1733
- Resting place: Lyme parish church
- Party: Whig
- Parents: Robert Burridge (father); Elizabeth Burridge (née Cogan) (mother)
- Relatives: John Burridge (nephew)

John Burridge (c. 1651 – 6 September 1733) was an English Whig politician and merchant engaged in the import of wine and linen. He sat as MP for Lyme Regis from 1689 till 1695 and December 1701 till 1710.

== Family and education ==
He was the first son of Robert Burridge (died 1676) and Elizabeth, the sister of John Cogan. He was educated at Wadham College, Oxford and matriculated on 13 March 1668. He never married.

== Parliamentary career ==
He was elected in 1689 and stood down in 1695. He returned in the second general election of 1701. He sat in the next three parliaments. In 1710, he voted for the impeachement of Dr Henry Sacheverell and he stepped down in favour of his nephew, John Burridge.

He died on 6 September 1733 and was buried in Lyme parish church.
