= William Badger (died 1629) =

16th-century English politician

William Badger (c. 1523 – buried 18 January 1629) was the member of Parliament for Winchester in the parliament of 1597.

Son of Robert Badger, a brewer of Winchester, Badger became an attorney, practising law in his native city. He was a freeman of Winchester by 1551, borough chamberlain in 1553 –1555, and mayor three times, in 1572–73, 1586–87, and 1597–98.

He was classified as a "papist" (i.e. Roman Catholic) in 1572, but was still legally consulted by the Church of England Bishop of Winchester afterward. He was clerk of the lands of the diocese in 1575, and acted jointly with his son Robert in this capacity from 1580. He contributed £50 towards the Armada fund in April 1589.

In parliament he sat on a committee with other lawyers to consider a bill concerning tillage, appointed on 13 December 1597. As burgess for Winchester he also had the opportunity of serving on a committee dealing with bread in January 1598.

He died intestate, and was buried in Winchester Cathedral on 18 January 1629. Administration of his estate was granted to his daughter Grace on 2 February 1630.

His biographer in the History of Parliament, A.B. Rosen, writes: "Though it is stretching credulity to have a man make his first appearance in Parliament aged over 70 and live to be a centenarian, the evidence in Badger’s case seems conclusive, both as regards its known dates and the absence of any break in career which might imply confusion between namesakes."
