= John Walker-Heneage =

John Walker-Heneage (17 May 1730 - 26 February 1806) was the member of Parliament for Cricklade in England from 4 April 1785 to June 1794.

He was hereditary usher to the Court of Exchequer as well as holding other hereditary positions.
