= William Lenthall (died 1702) =

Member of the Parliament of England

William Lenthall (died 1702) was the member of Parliament for Wallingford in October 1679 and Cricklade in 1681.
