= Samuel Robinson (1666–1729) =

English Member of Parliament (1666–1729)

Samuel Robinson (19 October 1666 – 9 December 1729) of Cheshunt, Hertfordshire was an English Member of Parliament.

He was the oldest surviving son of William Robinson of Bishop's Lane, Cheshunt and studied law at Gray's Inn from 1686.

He was the Member of Parliament for Cricklade in the parliaments of 1710–1713 and 1 June 1714–1715.

He died unmarried, leaving his property to a friend, Timothy Drew of .
