= Samuel Barker (MP for Cricklade) =

Samuel Barker (c. 1659 – 1 May 1708) was the member of Parliament for Cricklade in the parliaments of 1702 and 1705.
