= Agnes Porter =

British governess

- Born: c.1752 Edinburgh
- Died: 1814; Bruton, Somerset
- Occupation: Governess

Agnes Porter (c.1752 – 1814) was a Scottish governess known for her diaries and surviving correspondence. They cover the period from 1788 to 1814, and her employment by the Goddard family and by Henry Fox-Strangways, 2nd Earl of Ilchester.

== Life ==
Porter was born in Edinburgh; her year of birth is uncertain but her birthday was 18 June. Her father was a member of the clergy. She was fluent in French and she had an interest in other languages. She became a governess and she is remembered because of her diaries and correspondence which survive for the period 1788 to 1814. Her correspondents included Elizabeth Moser and Valentine Green, author of Triumphs of Reason Exemplified in Seven Tales (1791).

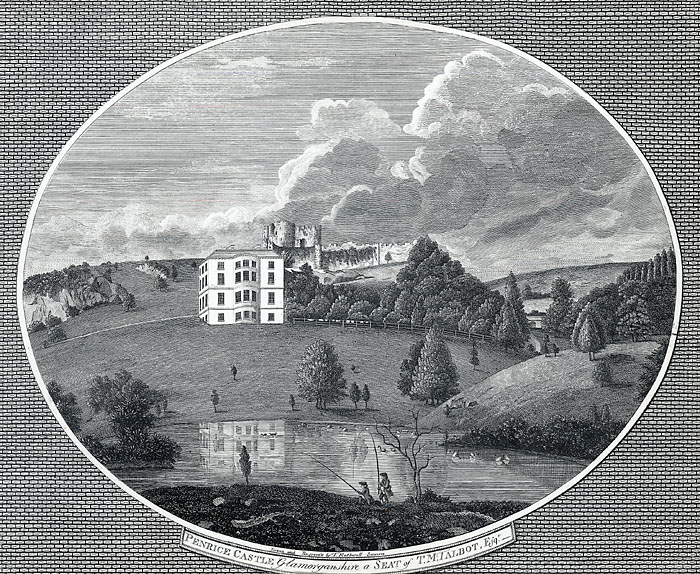
Penrice Castle in 1792, where Porter's diaries were found

In 1788 Porter moved from Great Yarmouth to be a governess to the daughters of Ambrose Goddard M.P. The Goddard family lived at Swindon House in Wiltshire.

She was later governess to the children of Henry Fox-Strangways, 2nd Earl of Ilchester. She continued her care down the generations, educating the cousins Henry Fox Talbot, the pioneer of photography, and Christopher Rice Mansel Talbot, politician and industrialist.

Porter went to live with her former pupil Mary Talbot in 1799 at Penrice Castle, where she cared for her children. She retired in 1806 and went to live with her married sister. Porter died in Bruton, Somerset and was buried there. Porter's diaries and letters were discovered in Penrice Castle in the 1970s and this resulted in the 1998 publication of A Governess in the Age of Jane Austen. The Journals and Letters of Agnes Porter.
