= Goddard family =

English landed family

The Goddard family were a prominent landed family chiefly living in the northern regions of the English counties of Wiltshire and Hampshire and the western part of Berkshire, between the Tudor period and the early 20th century.

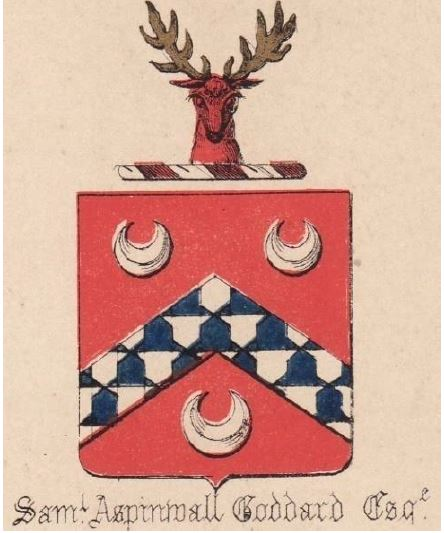
Crest and Arms granted to Samuel Aspinwall Goddard in 1842. Motto Cervus Non Servus, "A Stag not a Slave"

The Goddards were established at manors in Upper Upham, near Aldbourne, and at Clyffe Pypard (both in Wiltshire) from at least the late 15th century. From 1563 until 1927, the family were lords of the manor of Swindon, living on the Goddard Estate at the house known as The Lawn. Other important manors included Ogbourne St George in Wiltshire, Standen at Hungerford in Berkshire and Stargroves at East Woodhay in Hampshire.

== Wiltshire Goddards ==
=== Upper Upham ===
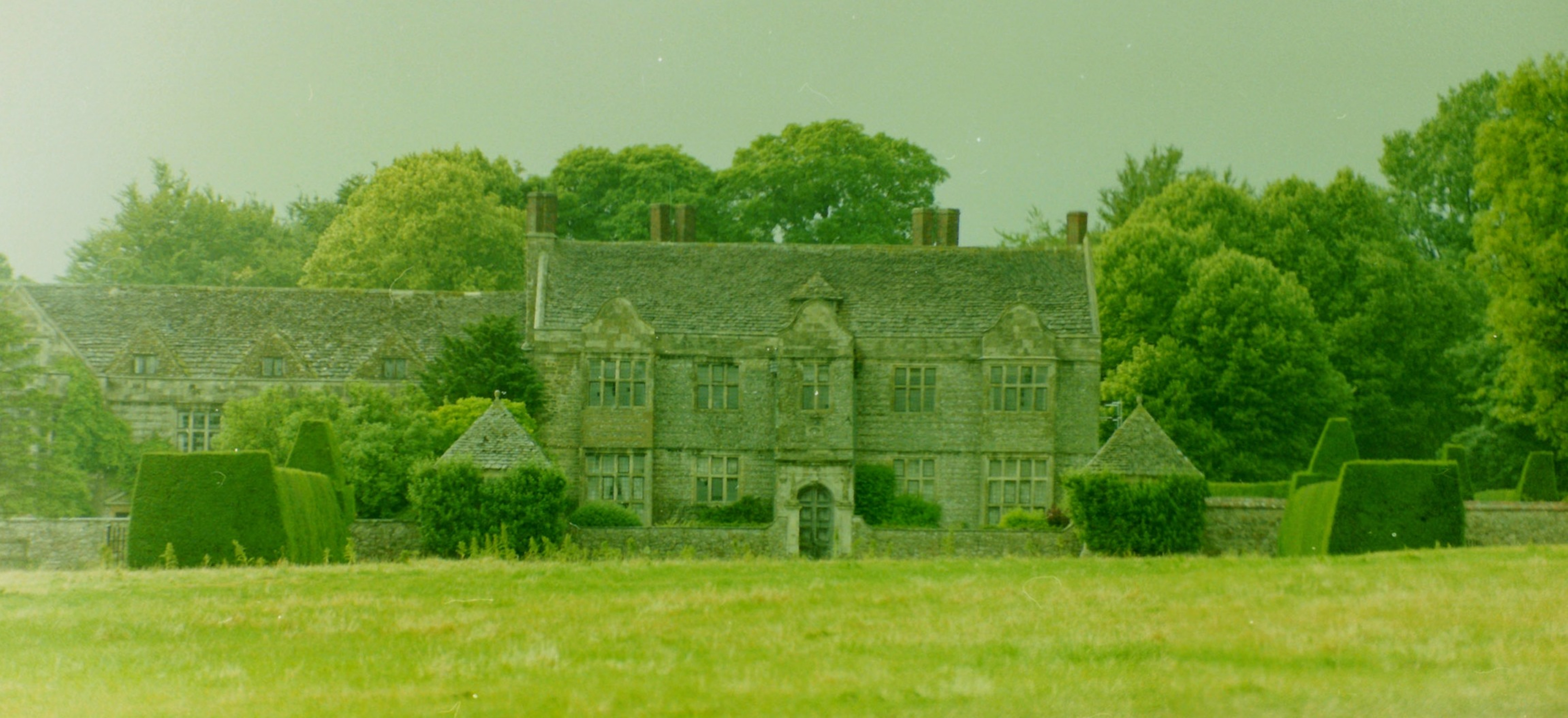
Upper Upham Manor House in 1989

The manor of Upper Upham, in Aldbourne parish south-east of Swindon, was held by Lacock Abbey from the 13th century until the dissolution, then in 1540 was purchased by John Goddard (died 1557). His grandson Richard (died 1614) built a substantial house there in 1599. The estate was sold by his descendants sometime before the early 18th century, but in 1870 was bought by Ambrose Lethbridge Goddard (1819–1898); his son Fitzroy Pleydell Goddard sold it in 1909. Upham House still stands, altered and extended in the early 20th century, and later divided into three dwellings.

=== The Lawn estate, Swindon ===
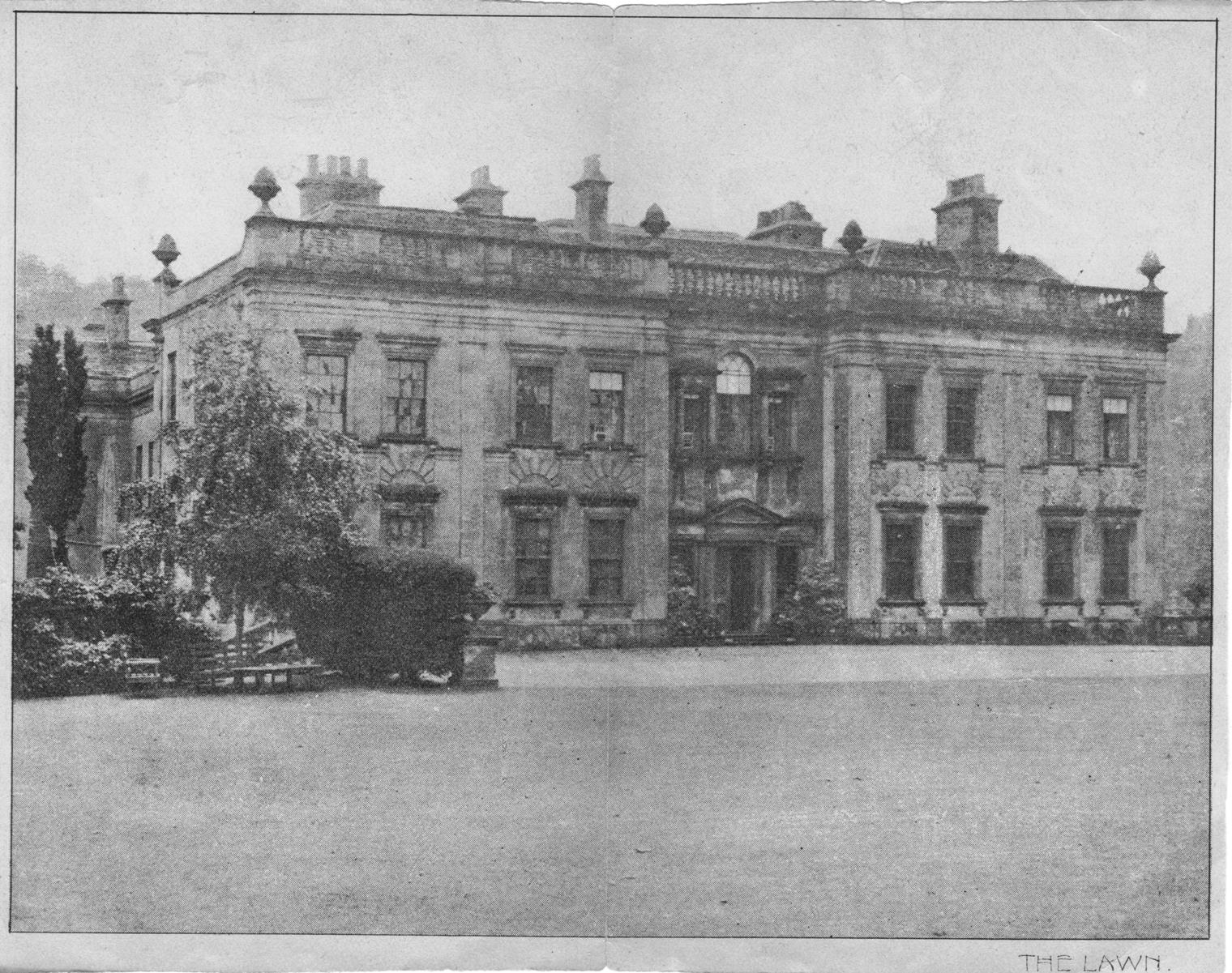
The Lawns c. 1900

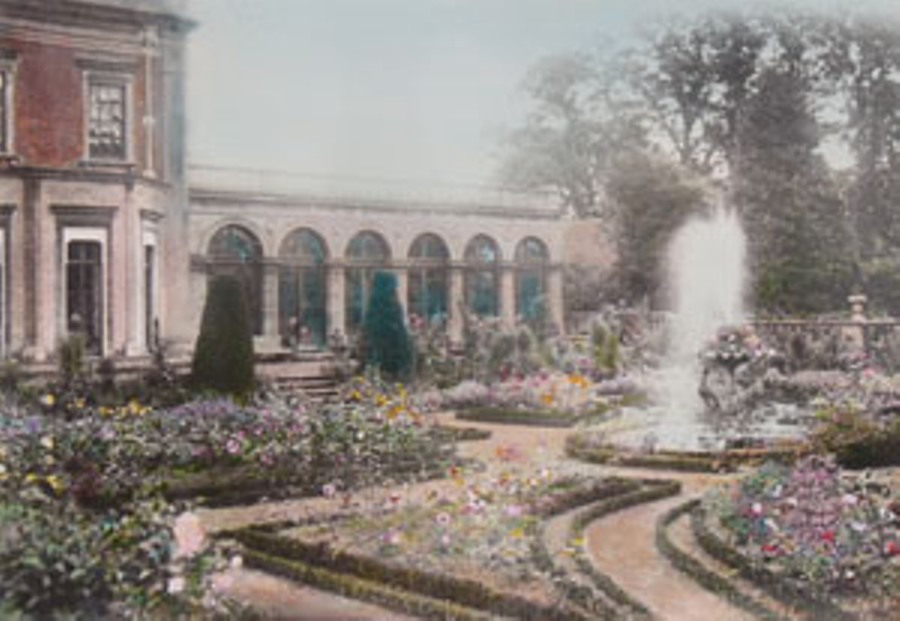
Part of the gardens at The Lawn, 1920

Thomas Goddard of Upham acquired the manor of Swindon in 1563 from the Crown. He later purchased the Crown Inn, renamed the Goddard Arms, which become Swindon's de facto Town Hall, courthouse and council rooms until the mid-19th century.

Thomas Goddard's purchase was said to include profits of the fairs and the weekly market, 60 messuages, 40 cottages, 2 water mills, 100 gardens, 100 orchards, 600 acres (2.4 km^{2}) of land, 200 acres (0.81 km^{2}) of meadows, 1,000 acres (4.0 km^{2}) of heath, 30 acres (120,000 m^{2}) of woods, 120 acres (0.49 km^{2}) of pasture and one dovecote.

The estate included the area known today as the Lawn, and was bounded by the High Street and the site of Christ Church. The manor house was rebuilt around 1770; it is probable that this was on the site of a mediaeval building. It was known as Swindon House until 1850, and later as The Lawn.

The family home was a double-cube fronted building of brick with stone dressings and a baluster parapet. To the east of this was a five-bedroom dining block that looked out onto the gardens. When last occupied by the family, The Lawn had an outer and inner hall on the ground floor (giving access to a lobby and drawing room), a dining room with adjoining study, billiard room, library and gun room. There were two staircases leading to the various bedrooms, some with adjoining dressing rooms, and also the nursery and servants' quarters.

The grounds included an arboretum, lawns, artificial lakes and ornamental gardens and was used for entertaining, garden parties and fêtes. During cold periods the frozen lakes were used by the family and local residents for ice skating.

The last of the male line, Major Fitzroy Pleydell Goddard, a diplomat, died in 1927. His widow, Eugenia Kathleen, left Swindon in 1931. Subsequent to this, the house remained empty until it was occupied by British and American forces during World War II. Damaged by the military, it was bought from The Crown by Swindon Corporation in 1947 for £16,000. The sale included 53 acres (210,000 m^{2}) of land, the manor house and the adjacent Holy Rood Church.

The house was derelict by 1952 and demolished. The grounds were opened as parkland and remain so. Today, the wood, lake, sunken garden, elements of the walls and the gateposts at the entrance to The Lawns are all open to the public. The site of the former stables is now the Planks auction house.

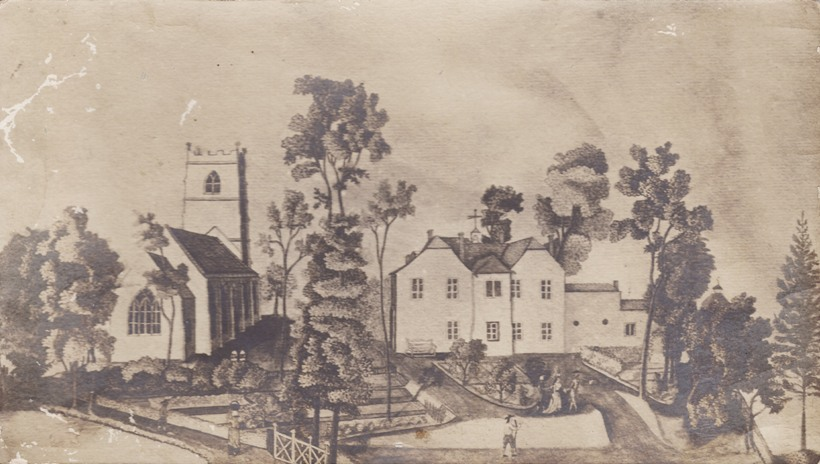
Manor House and Church, Clyffe Pypard, painted about 1754. The young couple on the lawn are intended for Edward Goddard and his bride Johanna, who were married 27 August 1754.

=== Lords of the manor of Swindon ===
Descendants of Thomas Goddard were lords of the manor until the 20th century. In the following list, descent is from father to son unless noted.

- 1563–1598 Thomas Goddard and wife, Anne Paulet Gifford
- 1598–1614 Richard Goddard; the 1615 monument in Aldbourne parish church, with wife and four children, is probably his
- 1614–1641 Thomas Goddard; granted the right to hold markets and fairs in the town in 1626 from the King
- 1644–1650 Richard Goddard
- 1651–1683 Thomas Goddard (minor until 1669, with his mother as guardian until 1656 and Thomas Bowman until 1669)
- 1683–1703 Thomas Goddard; converted one of the estate's alms houses into the town's first Market House in 1703
- 1703–1732 Richard Goddard (MP for Wootton Bassett 1710, for Wiltshire 1722)
- 1732–1742 Pleydell Goddard (brother of Richard Goddard)
- 1745–1754 Ambrose Goddard (cousin of Pleydell Goddard)
- 1757–1770 Thomas Goddard (eldest son of Ambrose Goddard)
- 1770–1815 Ambrose Goddard (youngest son of Ambrose Goddard); MP for Wiltshire 1772–1806; a director of the Wilts & Berks Canal, donated site for Christ Church, Swindon
- 1852–1895 Ambrose Lethbridge Goddard (1819–1898); deputy-chairman of the Midland and South Western Junction Railway

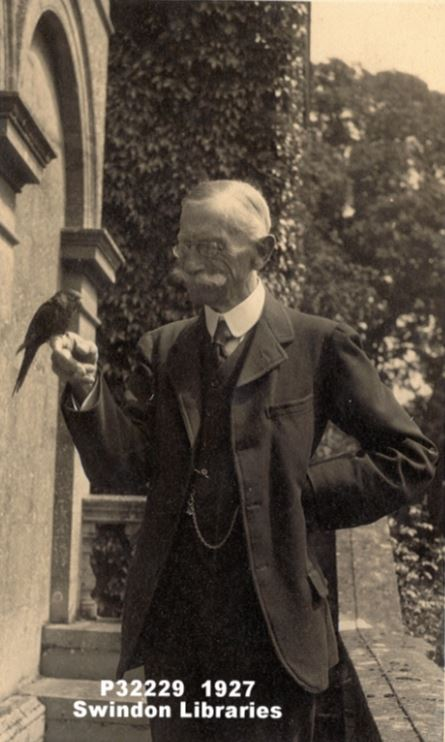
Fitzroy Pleydell Goddard (1852–1927)

- 1895–1927 Fitzroy Pleydell Goddard; Army Major and diplomat, High Sheriff of Wiltshire in 1907

=== Members of Parliament for Wiltshire constituencies ===
- Richard Goddard (1676–1732), Member of Parliament for Wootton Bassett 1710, for Wiltshire 1722
- Thomas Goddard (1777–1814), Member of Parliament for Cricklade from 1806 to 1812
- Ambrose Goddard (1779–1854), Member of Parliament for Cricklade from 1837 to 1841
- Ambrose Lethbridge Goddard (Lord of the manor), Member of Parliament for Cricklade from 1847 to 1868 and 1874 to 1880 (alongside Sir Daniel Gooch)

== Hampshire Goddards ==
Stargroves (also known as Stargrove House) is a manor house and associated estate at East Woodhay, Hampshire. The Goddard family owned the estate from 1565 until the early 19th century. Oliver Cromwell stopped at Stargroves after the second battle of Newbury (27 October 1644), and was entertained by the owner, John Goddard. By 1821, the property was owned by the Earl of Carnarvon; the present Stargrove House is from the middle of that century.

== Berkshire Goddards ==
In the 1550s, Standen Manor to the south of Hungerford was bought by John Goddard (1511–1567) of Upper Upham House, Wiltshire. The family purchased Clyffe Pypard manor in Wiltshire around the same time and divided their time between the two. The property was sold outside the family in 1719; the present country house on the Standen estate is from early in that century.
