= Christ Church, Swindon =

Anglican church in London, England

- Christ Church, Swindon
- 51.55376°N 1.77439°W
- OS grid reference: SU 15744 83897
- Location: Swindon
- Country: England
- Denomination: Anglican

History
- Status: Parish church

Architecture
- Functional status: Active
- Heritage designation: Grade II* listed
- Designated: 1951
- Architect: George Gilbert Scott
- Style: Gothic Revival
- Years built: 1850 - 1851

Administration
- Diocese: Diocese of Bristol

Christ Church, Swindon is a parish church located in the Old Town area of Swindon in Wiltshire. A Church of England establishment, it is part of the deanery of Swindon in the Diocese of Bristol. Built to the Gothic Revival design of Victorian architect George Gilbert Scott, Christ Church is Grade II* listed on the National Heritage List for England.

== History and architecture ==
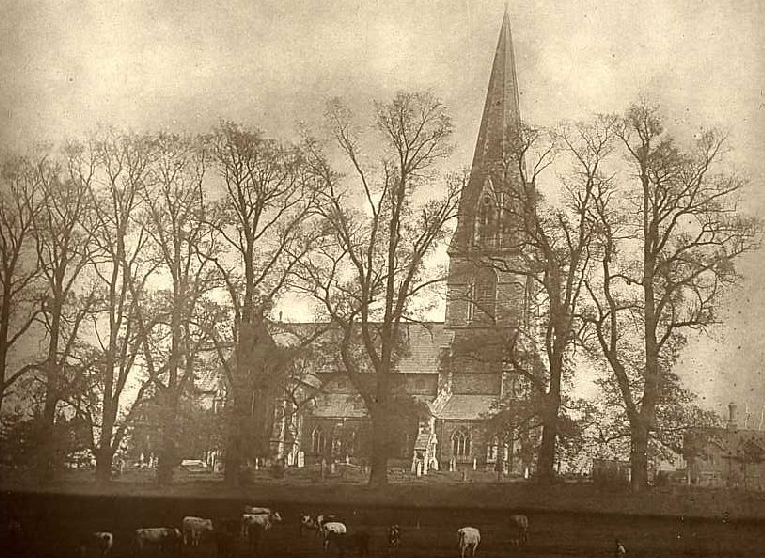
Christ Church in 1885

In 1843, the Great Western Railway opened its principal locomotive works in Swindon, transforming the small market settlement into a major industrial centre. By 1847 it was apparent that the medieval parish church of Holy Rood, which stood on the Lawn Manor estate, was unable to cater for the pastoral needs of Swindon's rapidly expanding population. That year, the architect George Gilbert Scott was asked to provide a design for a new church. Scott had already been engaged on the design of nearby St Mark's church, which was built between 1843 and 1845.

A new site on Cricklade Street, approximately 400m north-west of Holy Rood, was donated by Ambrose Goddard, Lord of Lawn Manor, for the purposes of erecting the new church. Construction began in June 1850 and took just over a year to bring to completion. The service of consecration took place on 7th November 1851, presided over by the Bishop of Llandaff Alfred Ollivant, when the church was dedicated to Christ. A clock made in 1843 was brought from Holy Rood and installed in the new church along with six bells. In 1852 the now redundant Holy Rood was partly demolished, with only the chancel preserved as a small chapel.

Scott's Early Decorated design for Christ Church comprises nave with aisles, transepts, chancel and a three-stage west tower with broach spire. Rising above the Old Town hill, the spire serves as a prominent landmark in Swindon and is visible for many miles around. Scott's design for the tower and spire was based on the 13th century church of All Saints in Buckworth, Cambridgeshire.

The stained glass installed in the five-light east window was made at the workshop of William Wailes in 1855 and depicts scenes and parables from Gospels of Matthew and Luke, with the Parable of the Prodigal Son shown to the centre. In total, Wailes's workshop provided seven windows for the church out to 1871, primarily individual memorial commissions. Five more stained-glass windows in the aisles are work of Francis Allcock Oldaker, installed between 1885 and 1902.

Christ Church was patronised by successive generations of the Goddard family of Lawn Manor. Fittings paid for by members of the family include the 1891 marble and alabaster reredos installed on the high altar, which is carved with scenes of the Expulsion from the Garden of Eden and the Annunciation, the 1905 alabaster baptismal font with wrought iron cover, and the 1906 pulpit, with carved figures of Jesus and the apostles. In the north transept is a stained glass window designed by Martin Travers and installed in 1931. It depicts the North Wessex Downs as seen through an array of hollyhocks and butterflies. It was given in memory of Fitzroy Pleydell Goddard. Opposite, also by Travers, is second window of the same date, depicting the Nativity.

The Lady Chapel, south of the chancel, was added to the building in 1935 to a design by architect Harold Brakspear. On the exterior of the chapel is a canopied carving of Jesus as the Good Shepherd. Inside is a 1957 stained-glass window by George Cooper-Abbs that shows Mary with Infant Christ, and a 1987 Annunciation window by John Hayward, which replaced one that had been vandalised.

Geoffrey Robinson's 1975 window in the south porch, which commemorates the Great Western Railway, depicts a steam engine belonging to the company in full motion.

The interior of Christ Church was remodelled in 2017 to provide better access, a gas heating system and LED lighting. The nave pews were retained and secured with a new fixing system that allows them to be removed to provide more space for large events.

== Notable burials ==
Christ Church Burial Ground contains the graves of 25 servicemen who died during the first and second world wars. Among them is the Irish jockey Tommy Cullinan (1906-1940). In 1930, Cullinan became the first jockey to win the unofficial Triple Crown of National Hunt racing in a single season, riding the winning horse in each of the Grand National, the Cheltenham Gold Cup and the Champion Hurdle.

== Gallery ==
Interior view of nave towards chancel

View of chancel and east window by William Wailes (1855)

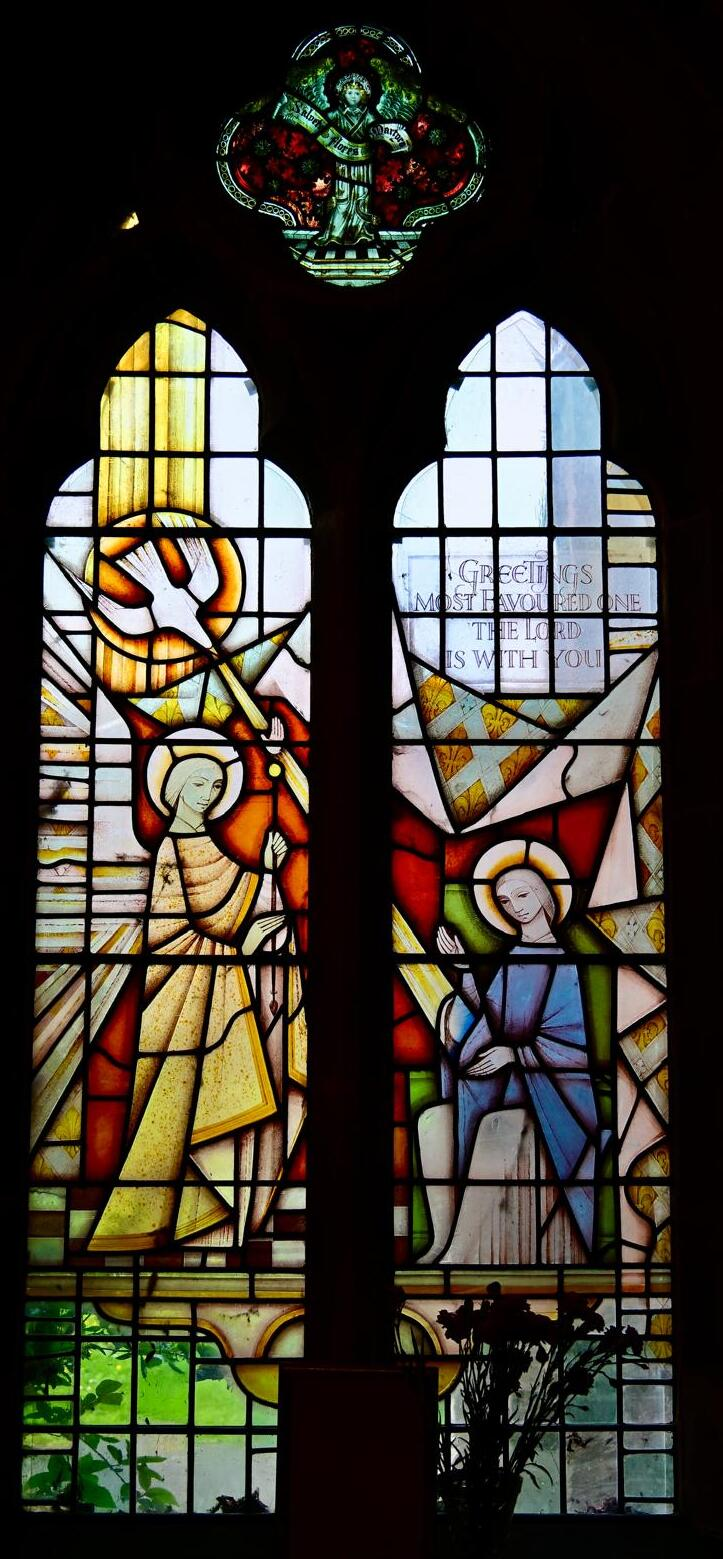
Lady chapel window by John Hayward (1987)

Great Western Railway window by Geoffrey Robinson (1975)
