= Ambrose Goddard (born 1779) =

British landowner, business director and politician (1779–1854)

Ambrose Goddard (9 October 1779 – 29 November 1854) was a British landowner, business director and politician.

The son of Ambrose Goddard, Member of Parliament for Wiltshire, Goddard became chair of the Wilts and Berks Canal Company, and served as a deputy lieutenant of Wiltshire. From 1819 to 1820, he was High Sheriff of Wiltshire.

At the 1837 general election, Goddard stood in Cricklade for the Conservative Party, winning a seat. He stood down at the 1841 general election.

Goddard's oldest son, Ambrose Goddard, also became a politician.

== See also ==
- Goddard family of Wiltshire, Hampshire and Berkshire

Civic offices
Preceded by John Long	High Sheriff of Wiltshire; 1819–1820	Succeeded by Ambrose Awdry
Parliament of the United Kingdom
Preceded by John Neeld; Robert Gordon	Member of Parliament for Cricklade; 1837 – 1841; With: John Neeld	Succeeded by John Neeld; Henry Thomas Howard
