= Sir Thomas Lethbridge, 2nd Baronet =

British politician and military officer (1778–1849)

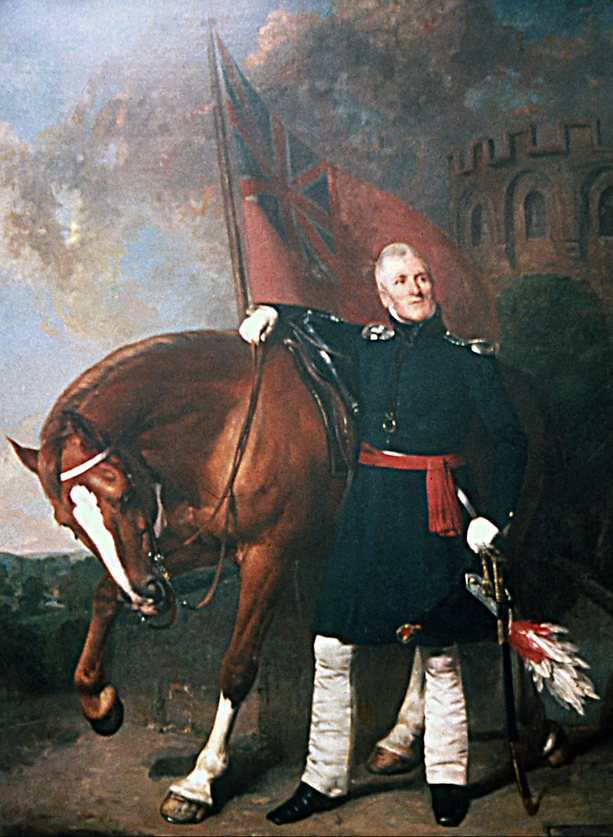
1839 portrait of Lethbridge by Thomas Mogford

Sir Thomas Buckler Lethbridge, 2nd Baronet (21 February 1778 – 17 October 1849) was a British politician and military officer.

== Origins ==
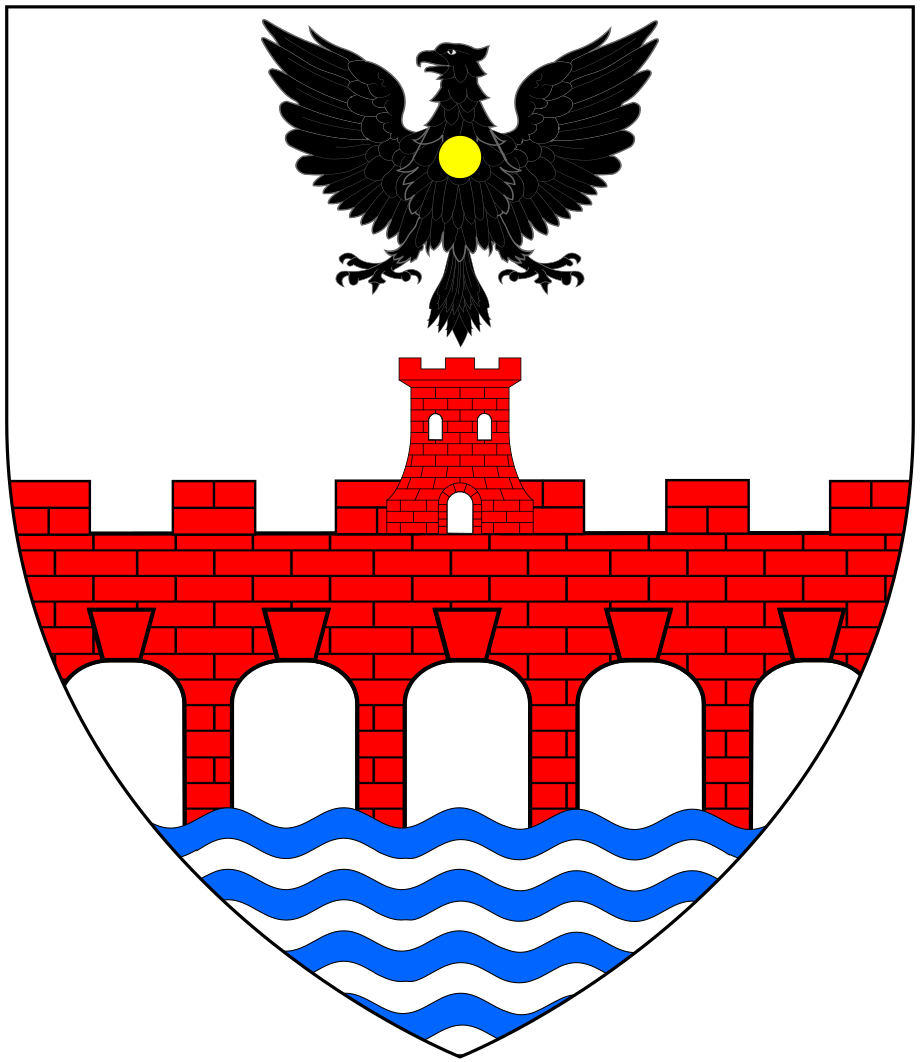
Canting arms of Lethbridge: Argent, over water proper, a bridge of five arches embattled gules and over the centre arch a turret in chief an eagle displayed sable charged on the breast with a bezant

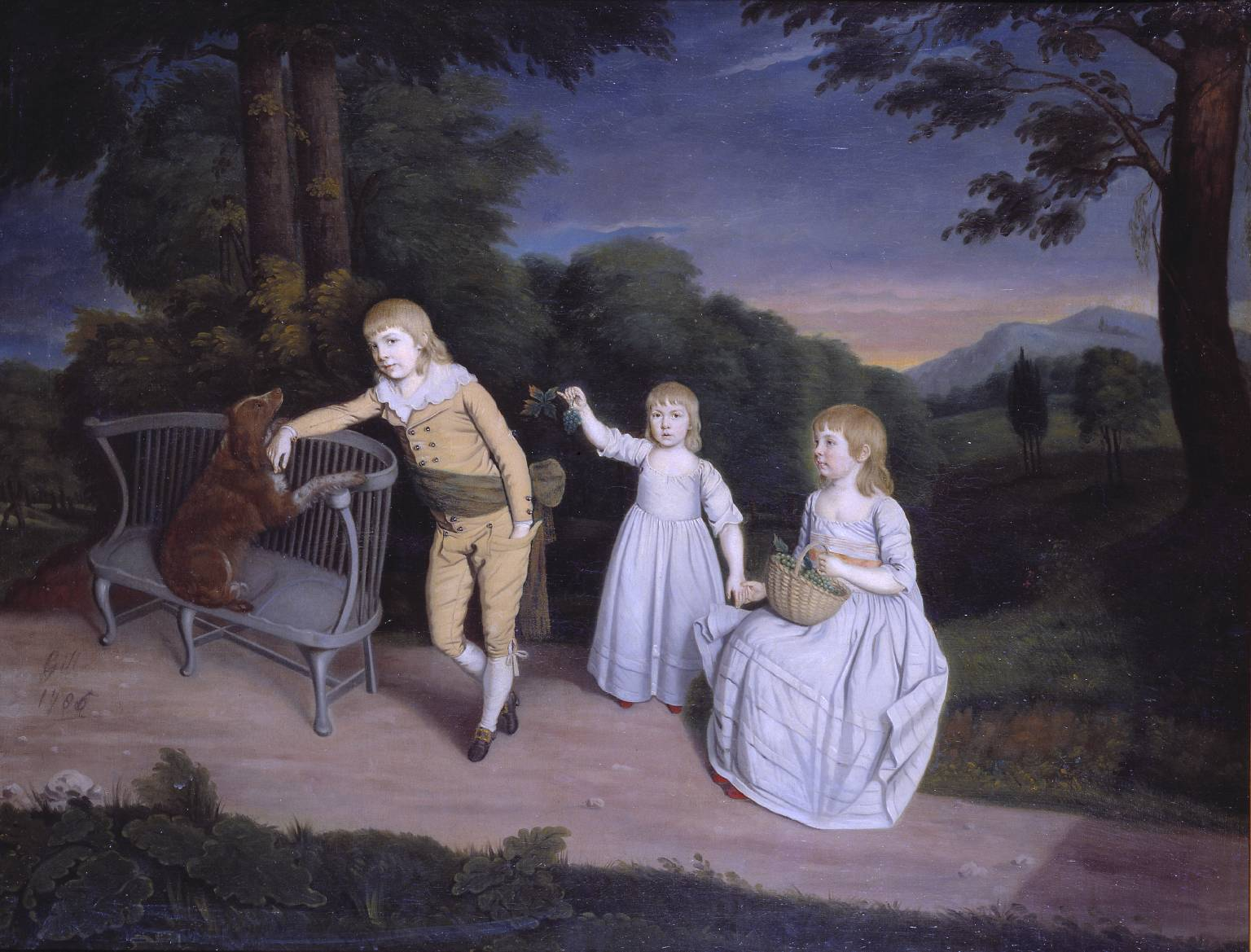
Thomas Lethbridge as a child, with his sisters Dorothea and Frances Maria, 1785 portrait by Charles Gill, Tate Gallery

He was born on 21 February 1778, the son and heir of Sir John Lethbridge, 1st Baronet (d.1815) of Sandhill Park, whose title had been created in 1804 for his help in paying the Prince Regent's gambling debts. He was disinherited by his father, but they were later reconciled, but the will was destroyed shortly before his father died in 1815. His mother Dorothy died in 1831. His sisters were Dorothea Lethbridge who in 1800 married Henry Powell Collins, a Member of Parliament for Taunton and Frances Lethbridge, who in 1804 married Sir Charles Henry Rich, 2nd Baronet. Through his father's affair with Mary Jane Clairmont, he had an unacknowledged half-sister, Claire Clairmont, mother of Lord Byron's daughter Allegra.

== Career ==
Lethbridge was educated at Oxford. In May 1806 Lethbridge became one of two MPs for Somerset. As a rural squire, he was a staunch defender of the Corn Laws in their last years before repeal and was opposed to the Anti-Corn Law League. Considered a High Tory, he resigned his seat in 1830, two years before the Great Reform Act.

=== Banking, finance and commerce ===
Lethbridge was the principal founder of the West Somerset Savings Bank at Taunton, on 6 September 1817. By 1821 the bank had deposits of almost £90,000, with over 2,500 depositors. Despite being regarded as a reliable banker, Lethbridge lost heavily on his own investments. These included speculative canals which remained unbuilt, long tramroads beyond the practical bounds of local technology and ventures in the iron industry. By 1840 he was practically bankrupt. (Note: This was a time of great expansion for iron-making in South Wales and great fortunes were being made by most other investors and ironfounding dynasties. Many though lost them in the crash of 1839.)

=== Iron industry ===
Lethbridge's involvement with the South Wales iron industry, across the Bristol Channel from Somerset, began in 1825 when he invested in the Hunt brothers' Pentwyn ironworks, in Abersychan, near Pontypool. In 1836 he was a principal shareholder for the newly formed Monmouthshire Iron and Coal Company on the greenfield 'Victoria' site south of Ebbw Vale. Despite the name, this company was based in Bath and drew most of its subscribers from Somerset, Dorset and Wiltshire. The ironworks progressed well at first and in 1838 produced 692 tons of bar iron. The year 1839 brought a collapse in the price of iron which caused widespread bankruptcies. In November this was compounded by the Newport Rising, encouraged by the ironmasters and coal owner's cutting of wages to save money. By 1840 Lethbridge was effectively bankrupt and sought other means to make money, looking to his estates in Somerset.

=== Iron ore mining ===
Iron ore mining on the Lethbridge estate was long established, albeit on a tiny scale. A number of shallow scrapes in the ground had existed since time immemorial; these were known as the 'Roman' workings, although they were more likely medieval. (Note: There was little evidence of Roman industry in the area this far West in Somerset.) Lethbridge played a major role in the Brendon Hills Iron Ore Company and the West Somerset Mineral Railway.

=== Military ===
Lethbridge was appointed Colonel of the 2nd Somerset Militia on 23 February 1819 and was also colonel-commandant of the West Somerset Yeomanry.

== Marriages and children ==
Lethbridge married twice:

- Firstly, in 1796, to Jacintha Catherine Hesketh (d.1801), a member of the Hesketh family of Rufford Hall in Lancashire, by whom he had two children, a son and a daughter:
  - John Hesketh Lethbridge, 3rd Baronet, eldest son and heir, who in 1817 married Harriet Rebecca Mytton, a daughter of John Mytton.
  - Jacinta ("Jessy") Dorothea Lethbridge, who in 1818 married Ambrose Goddard (1779–1854), MP, of Swindon in Wiltshire, and was the mother of Ambrose Lethbridge Goddard, and of Emma Caroline Goddard who married Greville Phillimore.
- Secondly, in 1803, he married Anne Goddard, a daughter Ambrose Goddard, of Swindon in Wiltshire, by whom he had two sons and four daughters:
  - Ambrose Goddard Lethbridge (died 1875), a barrister and Fellow of All Souls College, Oxford.
  - Thomas Prowse Lethbridge, who in 1834 married Isabella Escott, a daughter of Rev. Thomas Sweet Escott of Hartrow.
  - Anna Maria Lethbridge
  - Lucy Sarah Lethbridge, who in 1831 married Hugh Fitzroy, son of the Rev. Lord Henry Fitzroy.
  - Emma Dorothea Lethbridge, who in 1826 married Sir Francis Dugdale Astley, 2nd Baronet, the son of Sir John Astley, 1st Baronet, a Member of Parliament.
  - Frances Margaret Lethbridge.

== Death and succession ==
He died on 17 October 1849. An obituary notes the death of Sir Thomas Buckler Lethbridge, describing him as for many years a prominent Member of the House of Commons on the Conservative side. He was succeeded by his eldest son Sir John Hesketh Lethbridge, 3rd Baronet.

== Notes ==
Baronetage of the United Kingdom
Preceded by John Lethbridge	Baronet (of Westaway House and Winkley Court); 1815–1849	Succeeded by John Lethbridge
