= Henry Thomas Howard =

British soldier and politician

Hon. Henry Thomas Howard (16 January 1808 – 29 January 1851) was a British soldier and politician from the Howard family.

Howard was born at Charlton Park, Wiltshire, the second son of Thomas Howard, Viscount Andover, and his wife, Hon. Elizabeth Jane, daughter of James Dutton, 1st Baron Sherborne. In 1820, his father succeeded as the 16th Earl of Suffolk.

He was educated at Charterhouse School.

On 21 July 1825, he purchased a commission as an ensign in the 58th Regiment of Foot. He later became a lieutenant, and purchased an unattached captaincy on 9 November 1830. He was returned as member of parliament for Cricklade in 1841.

On 24 June 1845, he married Georgiana Maria, elder daughter of Sir John Guise, 3rd Baronet, at Rendcomb Park, Gloucestershire. They had three children:

- Thomas Bowes Howard (17 August 1847 – 25 February 1864), died young
- Elizabeth Frances Howard (14 October 1848 – 2 March 1898), married Richard William Selby-Lowndes
- Charles Henry Howard (July 1850 – 31 October 1874)

In 1851, he died following a six-day illness at Beauchamp near Gloucester, shortly after his 43rd birthday.

Parliament of the United Kingdom
Preceded by John Neeld; Ambrose Goddard	Member of Parliament for Cricklade; 1841–1847; With: John Neeld	Succeeded by John Neeld; Ambrose Lethbridge Goddard
