= James Clay (author) =

British politician (1804–1873)

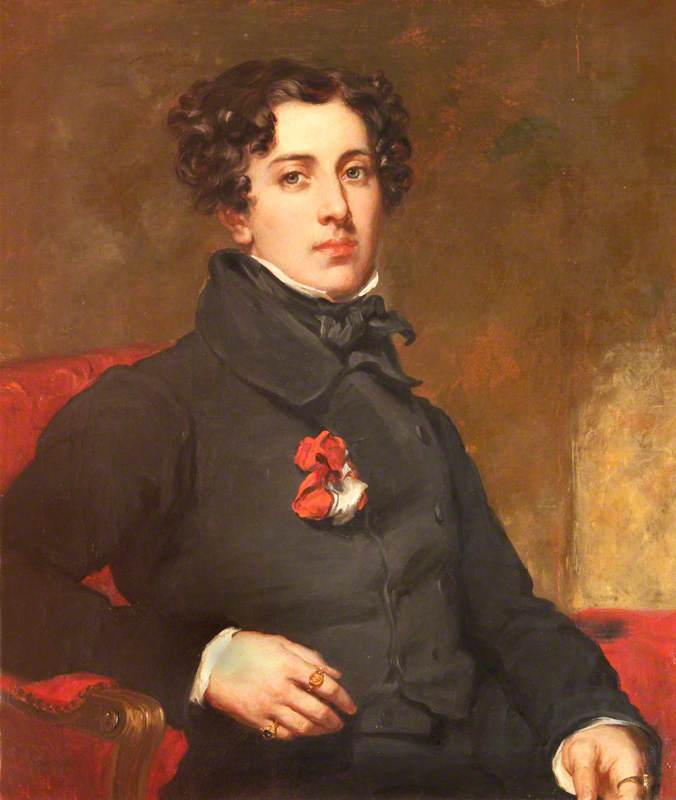
James Clay

James Clay (20 December 1804, London – 26 September 1873, Brighton) was an English politician and a leading whist authority.

== Early life and education ==
Clay was born in Bloomsbury, London, son of merchant James Clay (1764–1828) and Mary (1766/7–1840). He was educated at Winchester College, then went up to Balliol College, Oxford, where he took a "gentleman's third" in classics.

== Career ==
Clay was MP for Kingston upon Hull from July 1847 until 1853, when he was unseated after a bribery inquiry. He regained the seat at an 1857 by-election and held it until his death.

Clay played an important role in the development and passing of the Reform Act 1867. A radical who favoured greatly expanding the franchise, Clay entered into a pact with his old friend Benjamin Disraeli, who was responsible for the bill, to ensure it survived attacks and amendments from Gladstone. In return, Disraeli accepted Clay and his allies' amendments, which led to the enfranchisement of far more people than originally intended by the governing conservative party (Blake 1966, Disraeli).

According to an obituary in the Westminster papers: a monthly journal of chess, whist, games of skill and the drama Clay had been "the acknowledged head of the Whist world" for the last thirty years before his death, spending much of his time and attention on whist and piquet. In 1863 he became chairman of a committee for settling the laws of whist.

== Personal life ==
Clay married Eliza Camilla, daughter of General Josiah Allen Woolrych (1784-1849), of Weobley, Herefordshire, descendant of an ancient Shropshire family, at one time baronets. They had six children, including the musical composer Frederic Clay and Henry Clay (later Clay-Ker-Seymer), grandfather of the photographer Barbara Ker-Seymer.

Parliament of the United Kingdom
Preceded by Sir John Hanmer; Sir Walter James	Member of Parliament for Kingston upon Hull; 1847 – 1853; With: Matthew Talbot Baines to 1832; Viscount Goderich from 1852	Vacant Title next held by William Henry Watson; William Digby Seymour
Preceded by William Henry Watson; William Digby Seymour	Member of Parliament for Kingston upon Hull; 1857 – 1873; With: William Digby Seymour; Lord Ashley 1857–1859; Joseph Hoare 1859; Joseph Somes 1859–1865; Charles Morgan Norwood from 1865	Succeeded by Charles Morgan Norwood; Joseph Walker Pease
