= Neeld baronets =

Extinct baronetcy in the Baronetage of the United Kingdom

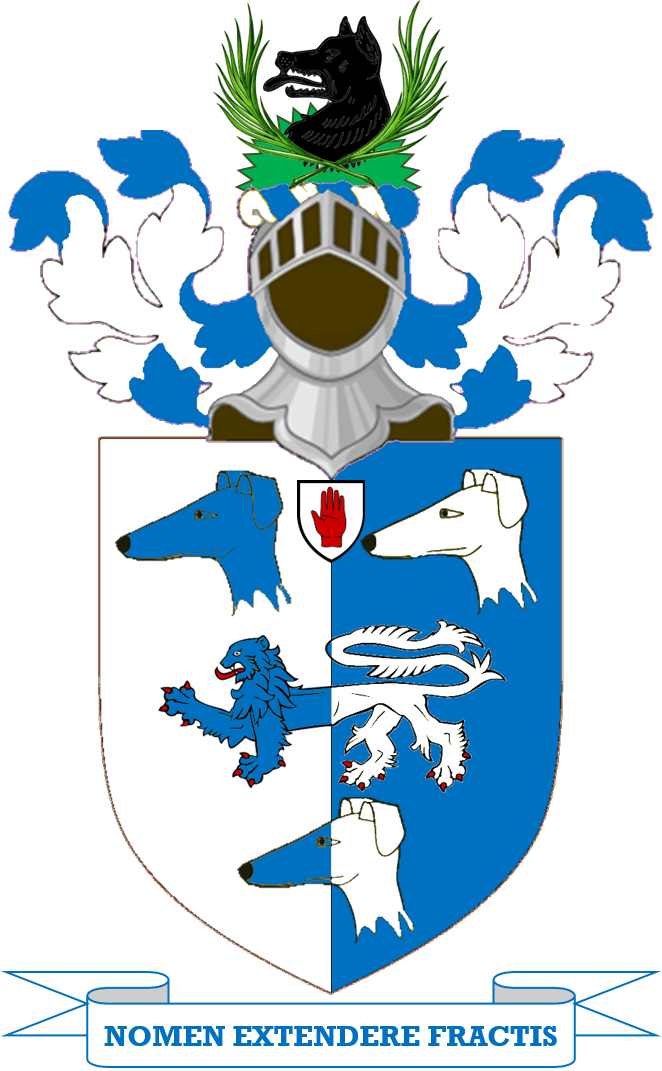
- Armorial achievement of the Neeld baronets of Grittleton
- Creation date: 1859
- Status: extinct
- Extinction date: 1941
- Motto: Nomen Extendere Factis (To perpetuate one's name by deeds)
- Arms: Per pale Argent and Azure a lion passant between three greyhounds' heads erased and Counterchanged.
- Crest: On a mount Vert a wolf’s head erased Sable between two branches of palm Proper

The Neeld Baronetcy, of Grittleton in the County of Wiltshire, was a title in the Baronetage of the United Kingdom. It was created on 20 April 1859 for John Neeld, a Conservative politician and Gentleman of the Privy Chamber to Queen Victoria. The title became extinct on the death of the third Baronet in 1941.

Joseph Neeld was the elder brother of the first Baronet.

== Neeld baronets, of Grittleton (1859) ==
- Sir John Neeld, 1st Baronet (1805–1891)
- Sir Algernon William, 2nd Baronet (1846–1900)
- Sir Audley Dallas Neeld, 3rd Baronet (1849–1941)
