= Joseph Walker Pease =

British politician

Joseph Walker Pease MP

Member of Parliament for Kingston upon Hull
- In office 24 October 1873 – 7 February 1874 Serving with Charles Morgan Norwood
- Preceded by: Charles Morgan Norwood; James Clay
- Succeeded by: Charles Morgan Norwood; Charles Wilson

Personal details
- Born: 1820
- Died: 22 November 1882 (aged 62)
- Party: Conservative

Joseph Walker Pease (1820 - 22 November 1882) was a Conservative Party politician.

Despite his Quaker beliefs, Pease was an enthusiast for the Volunteer movement and on 11 August 1860 was appointed Lieutenant-Colonel in command of the 1st (Consolidated) Battalion, East Yorkshire Rifle Volunteers. Until it built Londesborough Barracks in Kingston upon Hull as its drill hall in 1864, the battalion drilled at the Cyclops Foundry, in which Pease had a commercial interest.

He was elected Conservative MP for Kingston upon Hull at a by-election in 1873 but lost the seat very soon after at the 1874 general election.

Parliament of the United Kingdom
Preceded by Charles Morgan Norwood and James Clay	Member of Parliament for Kingston upon Hull; 1873 – 1874; With: Charles Morgan Norwood	Succeeded by Charles Morgan Norwood and Charles Wilson
