= William Henry Watson =

British politician and judge

Sir William Henry Watson QC (1 July 1796 – 13 March 1860), was a British politician and judge.

== Life ==
=== Early life ===
Watson was born at Nottingham, the son of John Watson, captain in the 76th Foot, by Elizabeth, daughter of Henry Grey of Bamburgh, Northumberland.

=== Career ===
He was educated at the Royal Military College, Marlow, and given a commission in the 1st Royal Dragoons by the Duke of York on 7 May 1812, serving with his regiment in the Spanish peninsula. When it was reduced in 1814 he exchanged into the 6th Dragoons on 13 April 1815, with whom he served in Belgium and France. He was present at the Battle of Waterloo and at the entry of the allied armies into Paris. He was placed on the half-pay list on 25 March 1816.

The next year Watson entered as a student at Lincoln's Inn, and by hard work soon became competent to practise as a special pleader, and continued to do so until 1832, when he was called to the bar in Lincoln's Inn. He joined the northern circuit, where he found work and became popular.

In 1841 he entered the House of Commons as liberal member for Kinsale, for which borough he sat till 1847. In 1843 he became a Q.C. and a bencher of his inn. He was an unsuccessful candidate for Newcastle-on-Tyne in the liberal interest, July 1852, but in 1854 he was elected member for Hull, and sat as such until on 3 November 1856 he was created Baron of the Exchequer, to succeed Sir Thomas Joshua Platt. He was knighted on 28 November of the same year.

In March 1857 he presided over the Cymmer Colliery explosion trial at the Glamorgan Spring Assizes held in Swansea when, on his direction, the jury acquitted the defendants.

Watson proved himself a judge possessed of clear head and strong mind, but his career on the bench was very short. On the conclusion of his charge to the grand jury of Montgomeryshire Spring Assizes at Welshpool, 13 March 1860, he was seized with apoplexy, and died, aged 63, at his lodging, fifteen to twenty minutes later. He was buried in the churchyard of Christ Church in the town on 17 March.

=== Personal life ===
Watson married, first, in 1826, a daughter of William Armstrong of Newcastle-on-Tyne, and sister of Lord Armstrong; secondly, in 1831, Mary, daughter of Anthony Hollist of Midhurst, Sussex. His grandson William Watson-Armstrong was ennobled as Baron Armstrong in 1903.

Coat of arms of William Henry Watson
Notes Displayed at the Great Hall of Lincoln's Inn Motto Deum Time Regem Honora

== Publications ==
He was distinguished as an advocate by honesty and earnestness rather than eloquence, but was a sound lawyer and the author of two (for a time) standard professional works:

- A Treatise on Arbitration and Award, London, 1825, 8vo; 3rd ed. 1846.
- A Treatise on the Law relating to the Office and Duty of Sheriff, 8vo, 1827; 2nd ed. 1848, by William Newland Welsby.

Parliament of the United Kingdom
Preceded by Henry Thomas	Member of Parliament for Kinsale; 1841 – 1847	Succeeded by Richard Samuel Guinness
Vacant writ suspended Title last held by Viscount Goderich; James Clay	Member of Parliament for Kingston upon Hull; 1854 – 1857; With: William Digby Seymour	Succeeded by James Clay; William Digby Seymour
