= Thomas Mogford (painter) =

English landscape painter

Thomas Mogford (1 May 1809 – 13 June 1868) was an English portrait painter and landscape painter.

== Life ==
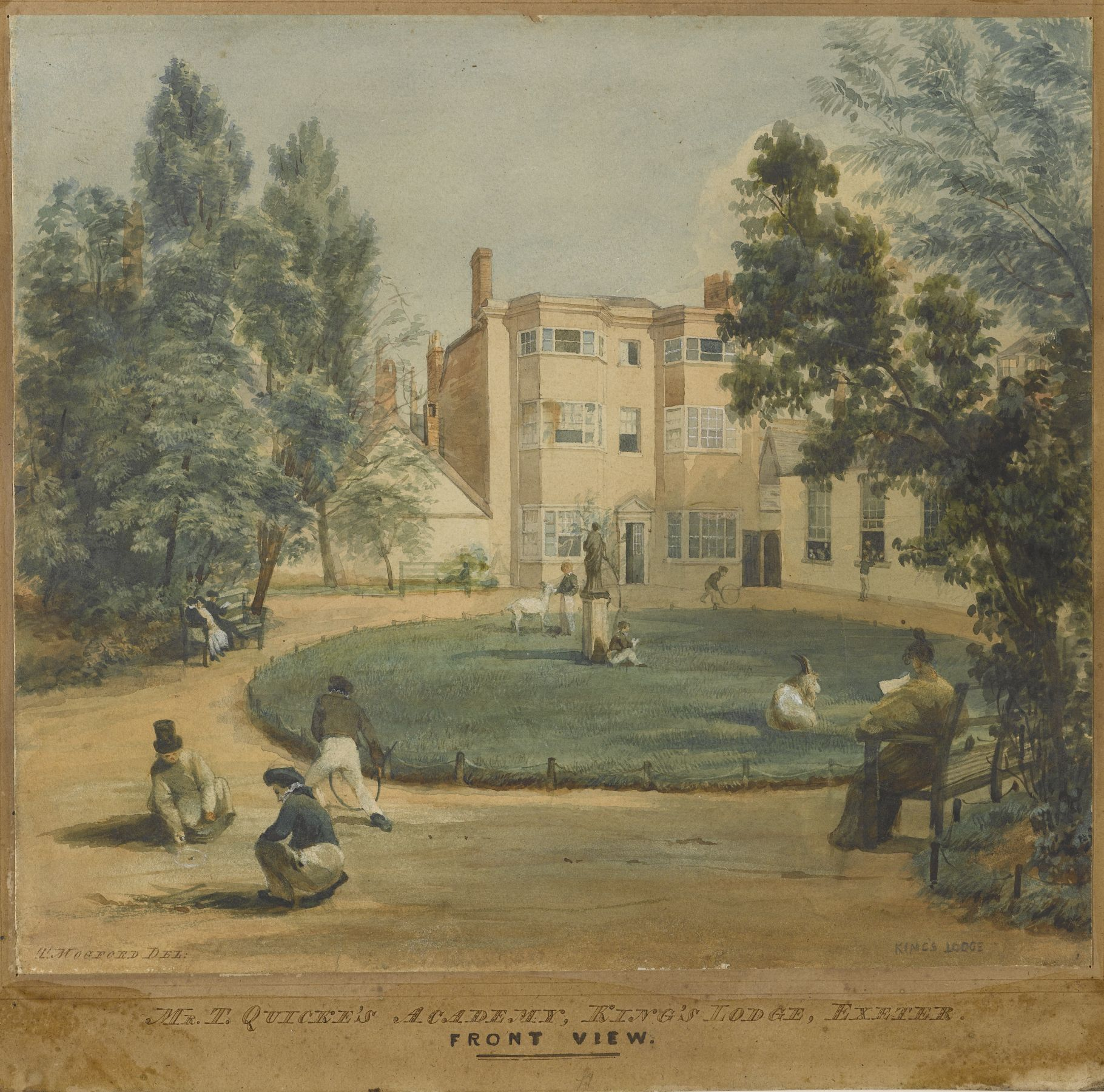
Mr Quicke’s Academy, between 1830 and 1840 painted by Thomas Mogford. The painting depicts an exterior view of Kings Lodge Exeter

Mogford was born in Exeter on 1 May 1809, son of a veterinary surgeon of Northlew, Devon. He showed an early talent for drawing, as well as mechanics and chemistry, but eventually decided on painting. He studied in Exeter under John Gendall, and was articled for some years to him and to Mr Cole. At the end of his apprenticeship he married Cole's eldest daughter, and settled in Exeter.

He sent three pictures to the Royal Academy of Arts in 1838, and three in 1839, including a full-length portrait of Sir Thomas Lethbridge, 2nd Baronet, with his horse and dog. About 1843 he moved to London, and subsequently exhibited at the Royal Academy portraits of the sculptor E. H. Baily, the engraver Samuel Cousins, the astronomer John Couch Adams for Cambridge University, the historian Henry Edward Napier and others. He also painted and exhibited The Sacrifice of Noah and The Loves of the Angels (Royal Academy 1846).

Subsequently he moved to Guernsey, where he practised almost entirely as a landscape painter; he also founded a school of painting on the island. He occasionally revisited England and Exeter to paint portraits. Though for some years crippled by palsy through the effects of lead poisoning, he continued to paint up to the day of his death. He died in Saint Martin in Guernsey in 1868.
