= George Michael Moser =

Swiss artist (1706–1783)

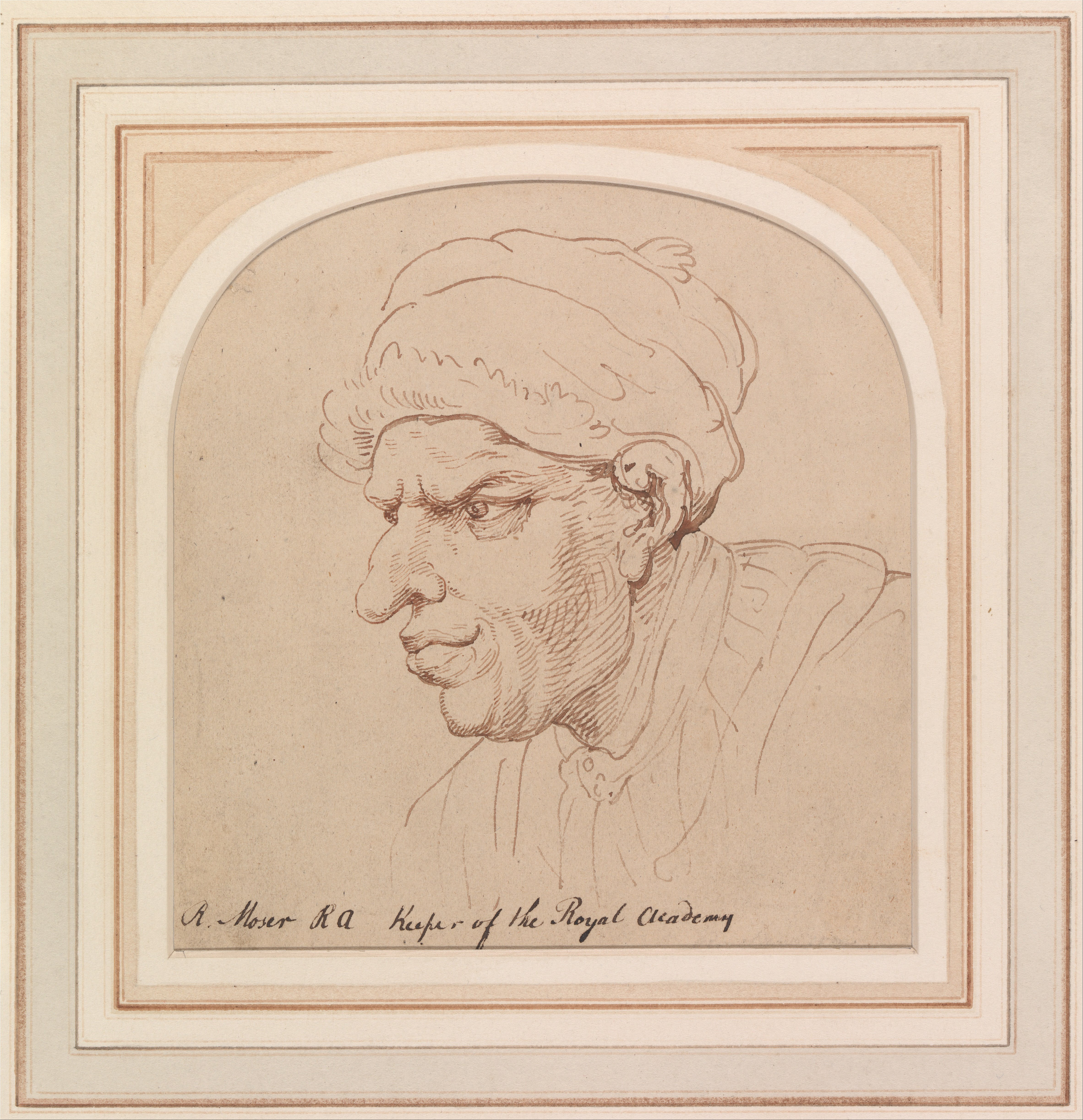
George Moser

George Michael Moser RA (17 January 1706 – 24 January 1783) was an artist and enameller of the 18th century, father of floral painter Mary Moser, and, with his daughter, among the founder members of the Royal Academy in 1768.

== Biography ==
He was the son of Michael Moser, an eminent Swiss engineer and worker in metal. Moser was born in Schaffhausen, Switzerland and trained initially as a coppersmith in Geneva. He later learnt additional skills as a chaser, goldsmith and engraver.

He moved to London during the 1720s and married Mary Guynier. Surviving metal works by him include elaborate gold snuffboxes and watch-cases (including movements by noted watchmakers George Philip Strigel and John Ellicott, among others), and silver candlesticks in the Rococo style.

He subsequently rose to be head of his profession as a gold-chaser, medallist, and enameller, and was particularly distinguished for the compositions in enamel with which he ornamented the backs of watches, bracelets, and other trinkets. A beautiful example of this work was a watch-case executed for Queen Charlotte, adorned with whole-length figures of her two eldest children, for which he received 'a hatful of guineas.' Moser was drawing-master to George III during his boyhood, and on his accession to the throne was employed to engrave his first great seal. When the art school afterwards known as the St. Martin's Lane Academy was established about 1736, in Greyhound Court, Strand, he became manager and treasurer, and continued in that position until the school was absorbed in the Royal Academy.

Moser was an original member, and afterwards a director, of the Incorporated Society of Artists, whose seal he designed and executed, and was one of the 21 directors whose retirement, in 1767, led to the establishment of the Royal Academy. To Moser's zeal and energy the latter event was largely due. In association with William Chambers, Benjamin West, and Francis Cotes, he framed the constitution of the new body, and on 28 November 1768, presented the memorial to the king asking for his patronage.

He became a foundation member, and was elected the first keeper, having rooms assigned to him in Somerset House. For this position he was well qualified by his powers as a draughtsman and knowledge of the human figure, while his ability and devotion as a teacher gained for him the strong affection of the pupils. He taught many notable artists including William Blake. Another student was his nephew Joseph Moser.

Moser was greatly esteemed in private life, and enjoyed the friendship of Samuel Johnson, Oliver Goldsmith, and other literary celebrities of his day. According to Boswell, he once greatly mortified Goldsmith by stopping him in the middle of a vivacious harangue with the exclamation, 'Stay, stay! Toctor Shonson's going to say something'.

He died at Somerset House on 24 January 1783, and was buried in the churchyard of St Paul's, Covent Garden, his funeral being attended by almost all his fellow-academicians and pupils. On the day after Moser's death a notice of him from the pen of Sir Joshua Reynolds was published, in which he was described as the first goldchaser in the kingdom, possessed of a universal knowledge of all branches of painting and sculpture, and 'in every sense the father of the present race of artists.'

== Family ==
He left an only daughter, Mary Moser.
