= Upper Upham =

Hamlet in Wiltshire, England

Coordinates: 51.493°N 1.675°W

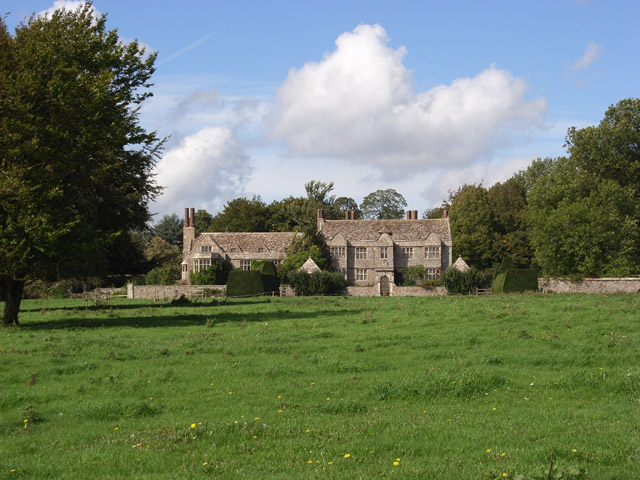
- Upham House

- Location within Wiltshire
- OS grid reference: SU226771
- Civil parish: Aldbourne
- Unitary authority: Wiltshire
- Ceremonial county: Wiltshire
- Region: South West
- Country: England
- Sovereign state: United Kingdom
- Post town: MARLBOROUGH
- Postcode district: SN8
- Dialling code: 01672
- Police: Wiltshire
- Fire: Dorset and Wiltshire
- Ambulance: South Western
- UK Parliament: East Wiltshire

Upper Upham is a hamlet and deserted medieval village in the civil parish of Aldbourne in the English county of Wiltshire. Its nearest town is Marlborough, which lies approximately 5.6 miles (9.0 km) to the south-west; the hamlet is reached by a narrow lane off the B4192 Aldbourne-Swindon road.

To the northwest of the hamlet are extensive remains of a medieval village, with a hollow way, house platforms and evidence of agriculture. The settlement is first documented as Upammere in a charter of 955, and by 1201 its name had become Upham. There were 40 taxpayers in 1377 but the population dwindled in the 15th and 16th centuries.

The manor was held by Lacock Abbey from around 1249 until the Dissolution. In 1540 it was purchased by John Goddard (died 1557), and remained in the Goddard family until sometime before the early 18th century. Aldbourne parish church has a memorial brass dated 1495 to an earlier Richard Goddard of Upham and his wife, and the church tower was erected in 1460 by either the same person or another of the same name.

Lower Upham is further west and has a farm and a pair of cottages; the lane between the two Uphams is now a farm track.

== Upham House ==
Upham House is a Grade II* listed country house with a five-bay southeast front, built in 1599 by the Goddards. The house was restored, altered and extended between 1909 and 1922 for Lady Currie; at the same time, formal gardens were laid out to the north of the house. The garden walls to the east of the house, and the gatehouse which led into the courtyard, are Grade II listed.

After 1965 the house was divided into three, and its outbuildings were sold for conversion into separate houses.
