= Ambrose Goddard (born 1819) =

British politician

Ambrose Goddard MP

Member of Parliament for Cricklade
- In office 4 February 1874 – 5 April 1880 Serving with Daniel Gooch
- Preceded by: Daniel Gooch; Frederick William Cadogan
- Succeeded by: Daniel Gooch; Nevil Story Maskelyne
- In office 30 July 1847 – 19 November 1868 Serving with Daniel Gooch (1865–1868); Anthony Ashley-Cooper (1859–1865); John Neeld (1847–1859)
- Preceded by: John Neeld; Henry Thomas Howard
- Succeeded by: Daniel Gooch; Frederick William Cadogan

Personal details
- Born: 9 December 1819
- Died: 15 November 1898 (aged 78)
- Party: Conservative
- Spouse: Charlotte Ayshford Sanford (m. 1847)
- Children: Five
- Parent(s): Ambrose Goddard; Jessy-Dorothea Lethbridge

Ambrose Lethbridge Goddard (9 December 1819 – 15 November 1898) was a British landowner and Conservative Party politician.

== Political career ==
Goddard was first elected MP for Cricklade in 1847 and held the seat until 1868. In 1874 he regained the seat before stepping down at the next election in 1880.

== Family ==
Goddard was the first son of former Cricklade MP Ambrose Goddard and Jessy-Dorothea Lethbridge, daughter of Somerset MP Thomas Lethbridge.

He married Charlotte Ayshford Sanford, daughter of former Somerset and West Somerset MP Edward Ayshford Sanford and Henrietta Langham, in 1847. Together they had five children:

- Ambrose Ayshford Goddard (1848–1885)
- Jessie Henrietta Goddard (1850–1920)
- Fitzroy Pleydell Goddard (1852–1927)
- Edward Hesketh Goddard (1855–1921)
- Charles Frederick Goddard (1863–)

== See also ==
- Goddard family of Wiltshire, Hampshire and Berkshire

Parliament of the United Kingdom
Preceded by Daniel Gooch; Frederick William Cadogan	Member of Parliament for Cricklade; 1874–1880; With: Daniel Gooch	Succeeded by Daniel Gooch; Nevil Story Maskelyne
Preceded by John Neeld; Henry Thomas Howard	Member of Parliament for Cricklade; 1847–1868; With: Daniel Gooch (1865–1868); Anthony Ashley-Cooper (1859–1865); John Neeld (1847–1859)	Succeeded by Daniel Gooch; Frederick William Cadogan
