= William Digby Seymour (1805–1872) =

William Digby Seymour (1805–1872) was a merchant in London and a Whig politician.

He was elected as Member of Parliament (MP) for Kingston upon Hull at a by-election in August 1854, after the constituency's writ had been suspended for a year following a void election in 1852. At the hustings he proclaimed himself a supporter of free trade, the secret ballot, an extension of the franchise, and of religious freedom and toleration.

He held the seat until the 1857 general election, when he did not stand again, and Hull was contested unsuccessfully by his namesake William Digby Seymour.

Parliament of the United Kingdom
| Vacant | Member of Parliament for Kingston upon Hull; 1854 – 1857; With: William Henry Watson to February 1857; James Clay from February 1857 | Succeeded by James Clay; Lord Ashley |
