= 1873 Kingston upon Hull by-election =

UK Parliamentary by-election

The 1873 Kingston upon Hull by-election was held on 22 October 1873. The by-election was fought due to the death of the incumbent Liberal MP, James Clay. It was won by the Conservative candidate Joseph Walker Pease.
