= Joseph Hoare (MP for Kingston upon Hull) =

Joseph Hoare MP

Member of Parliament for Kingston upon Hull
- In office 30 April 1859 – 12 August 1859 Serving with James Clay
- Preceded by: James Clay; Anthony Ashley-Cooper
- Succeeded by: James Clay; Joseph Somes

Personal details
- Born: 21 March 1814 Hampstead, London
- Died: 21 January 1886 (aged 71) Hampstead, London
- Party: Conservative
- Spouse(s): Rachel Juliana Barclay (m. 1847) Anne Amelia Buxton (m. 1836; died 1843)
- Parent(s): Samuel Hoare; Louisa Gurney
- Education: Trinity College, Cambridge

Joseph Hoare (21 March 1814 – 21 January 1886) was a British Conservative Party politician and banker.

== Early life and family ==
Born in 1814 at Child's Hill House in Hampstead, London, Hoare was the fourth son of Samuel Hoare and Louisa Gurney, daughter of John Gurney and Catherine Barclay.

Hoare was educated at Trinity College, Cambridge, before becoming a Partner in Hoare's Bank in Lombard Street, London, the UK's oldest and world's fourth oldest bank, which was founded by his ancestor Richard Hoare. He married Anne Amelia Buxton, daughter of Charles Buxton and Martha Henning, in 1836, but they had no children before her death in 1843.

In 1847, he remarried to Rachel Juliana Barclay, daughter of former MP Charles Barclay and Anna Maria Kett.

== Political career ==
He was elected MP for Kingston upon Hull in the 1859 general election but was unseated just under four months later, owing to corruption. In 1868 he stood for election at Manchester but failed to gain the seat.

== Other activities ==
Hoare was at some point the Deputy Lieutenant of Middlesex and president of the Hampstead Conservative Association.

Parliament of the United Kingdom
Preceded by James Clay; Anthony Ashley-Cooper	Member of Parliament for Kingston upon Hull; April 1859–August 1859; With: James Clay	Succeeded by James Clay; Joseph Somes
