= John Neeld =

British politician (1805–1891)

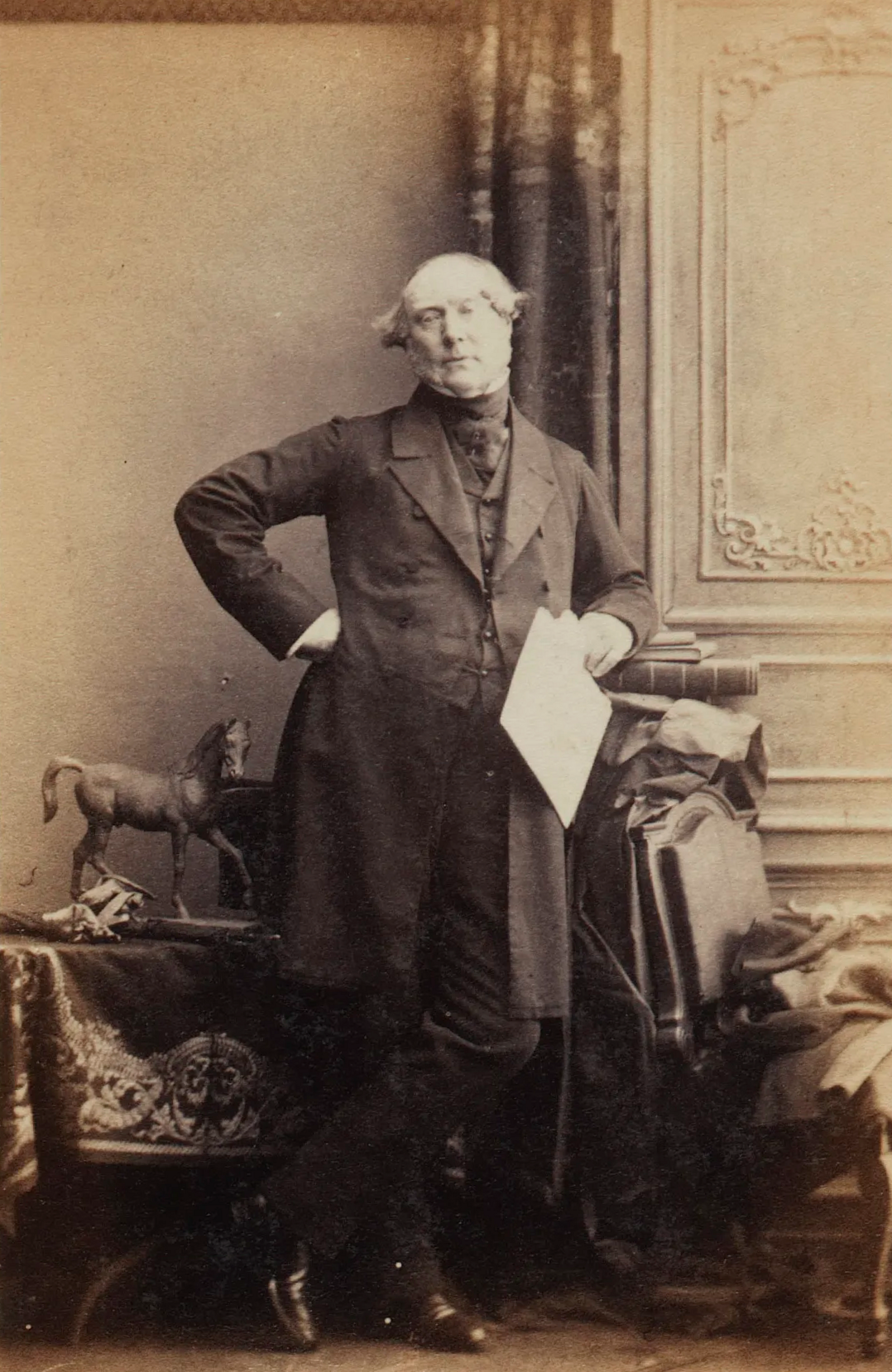
Portrait by Camille Silvy, 1861

Sir John Neeld, 1st Baronet (1805–1891) was a member of Parliament for Cricklade between 1835 and 1859, and Chippenham, Wiltshire, England, between 1865 and 1868.

== Early life and career ==
Neeld was one of five sons of Joseph Neeld (1754–1828) and his wife Mary (née Bond) (1765–1857), of Hendon, Middlesex. He was educated at Harrow School and Trinity College, Cambridge, where he took a B.A. in 1827 and an M.A. three years later.

In 1840 he was a founding member of the Conservative Club and in 1845 married Lady Eliza Harriet Dickson, setting up home in London. The same year he was appointed to the office of Gentleman of the Privy Chamber to Queen Victoria, for which service he was created 1st Baronet Neeld and became entitled to the style "Sir John Neeld" on 20 April 1859.

In 1852 he was offered the position of Junior Lord of the Treasury by Lord Derby, but refused.

Neeld became a major landowner in Wiltshire, having inherited from his brother Joseph in 1856; in 1872 he was High Sheriff of the county.

== Death and legacy ==
Neeld died on 3 September 1891 at Grittleton House, Wiltshire.

His eldest son Algernon William (11 June 1846 – 11 August 1900) succeeded as 2nd baronet; on his death, Neeld's second son, Audley Dallas Neeld (23 January 1849 – 1 May 1941) became the 3rd baronet and inherited Rembrandt's self-portrait of 1669, today in the Mauritshuis. On Audley's death the title became extinct.

Neeld's daughter Ada Mary (b. 11 June 1846), twin sister of Algernon, married General Sir George Harry Smith Willis, a British Army General who achieved high office in the 1880s, and they went on to have four sons. Lady Ada Mary Willis (née Neeld) opened the Southsea Railway on 1 July 1885, as her husband was the Lieutenant Governor of Portsmouth at the time.

== See also ==
- Neeld baronets

Parliament of the United Kingdom
Preceded by Thomas Calley; Robert Gordon	Member of Parliament for Cricklade; 1835 – 1859; With: Robert Gordon to 1837; Ambrose Goddard 1837–1841; Henry Thomas Howard 1841–1847; Ambrose Lethbridge Goddard from 1847	Succeeded by Lord Ashley; Ambrose Lethbridge Goddard
Preceded by Richard Penruddocke Long; William John Lysley	Member of Parliament for Chippenham; 1865 – 1868; With: Gabriel Goldney	Succeeded by Sir Gabriel Goldney
Baronetage of the United Kingdom
New creation	Baronet (of Grittleton House, Wiltshire); 1859 – 1891	Succeeded by Algernon William Neeld
