= Charles Morgan Norwood =

English steam ship owner and Liberal Party politician

Charles Morgan Norwood (1825 – 24 April 1891) was an English steam ship owner and Liberal Party politician who sat in the House of Commons from 1865 to 1885.

Morgan was the eldest son of Charles Norwood of Ashford Kent and his wife Catherine Morgan, daughter of Charles Morgan of Archangel Russia. He was a merchant and steamship owner, and was president of the Hull Chamber of Commerce in 1859 and 1860. He was also the first chairman of the Associated Chambers of Commerce of the United Kingdom. He was a Deputy Lieutenant for the East Riding of Yorkshire.

At the 1865 general election Norwood was elected as one of the two Members of Parliament (MPs) for Kingston upon Hull. He held the seat until 1885, when it was divided under the Redistribution of Seats Act 1885. He stood unsuccessfully for Bradford Central at the 1886 general election as a Liberal Unionist.

Norwood lived at Higham Hall, Woodford, Essex, with a townhouse at 11 Ennismore Gardens, Knightsbridge. He died at the age of 65.

Norwood married Anna Blakeney, daughter of John Henry Blakeney of Castleblakeney, Galway in 1855.

== Works ==
- Norwood, Charles Morgan (1882). "Suez Canal" . Great Britain and the Suez Canal. Vol. London. Chapman and Hall, Limited. pp. 11–15.

Parliament of the United Kingdom
Preceded by Joseph Somes; James Clay	Member of Parliament for Kingston upon Hull; 1865 – 1885; With: James Clay to 1873; Joseph Walker Pease 1873–1874; Charles Henry Wilson 1873–1885	Constituency divided
