= Frederick William Cadogan =

Frederick William Cadogan DL, JP (16 December 1821 – 30 November 1904), styled The Honourable from 1831, was a British barrister and Liberal politician.

He was the fourth son of George Cadogan, 3rd Earl Cadogan and his wife Honoria Louisa Blake, daughter of Joseph Blake and sister of Joseph Blake, 1st Baron Wallscourt. Cadogan was educated at Westminster School and then at Oriel College, Oxford. He was called to the bar by the Inner Temple in 1847 and practised in the Northern Circuit.

Having unsuccessfully stood for Bridgnorth in 1852 and for Stafford five years later, Cadogan entered the British House of Commons in 1868, sitting as member of parliament (MP) for Cricklade until 1874. He was a deputy lieutenant for Middlesex and represented the same county as well as Westminster as a justice of the peace.

On 29 November 1851, Cadogan married Lady Adelaide Paget, daughter of Henry Paget, 1st Marquess of Anglesey. They had three daughters and a son.

Parliament of the United Kingdom
Preceded by Sir Daniel Gooch; Ambrose Lethbridge Goddard	Member of Parliament for Cricklade; 1868 – 1874; With: Sir Daniel Gooch	Succeeded by Sir Daniel Gooch; Ambrose Lethbridge Goddard
