= Joseph Somes (Hull MP) =

Joseph Somes MP

Member of Parliament for Kingston upon Hull
- In office 20 August 1859 – 13 July 1865 Serving with James Clay
- Preceded by: James Clay; Joseph Hoare
- Succeeded by: James Clay; Charles Morgan Norwood

Personal details
- Born: 1819
- Died: 29 May 1871 (aged 52)
- Party: Conservative

Joseph Somes (1819 – 29 May 1871) was a British Conservative Party politician.

He was elected MP for Kingston upon Hull at a by-election in 1859 but lost the seat at the next election in 1865.

Parliament of the United Kingdom
Preceded by James Clay; Joseph Hoare	Member of Parliament for Kingston upon Hull; 1859–1865; With: James Clay	Succeeded by James Clay; Charles Morgan Norwood
