= Anthony Ashley-Cooper, 8th Earl of Shaftesbury =

British peer

The Right Honourable The Earl of Shaftesbury Bt DL
- Predecessor: The 7th Earl of Shaftesbury
- Successor: The 9th Earl of Shaftesbury
- Born: Anthony Ashley-Cooper; 27 June 1831; England
- Died: 13 April 1886 (aged 54); Regent Street, Westminster
- Cause of death: Suicide by revolver
- Spouse: Lady Harriet Chichester
- Issue: Six children (five girls and one boy)

Anthony Ashley-Cooper, 8th Earl of Shaftesbury Bt DL (27 June 1831 – 13 April 1886), styled Lord Ashley between 1851 and 1885, was a British peer. He was the son of The 7th Earl of Shaftesbury.

== Career ==
He was commissioned a cornet in the Dorsetshire Yeomanry on 26 July 1856 and was promoted Lieutenant on 21 January 1857. On 27 January 1857, he was appointed a deputy lieutenant of Dorset. He resigned his Yeomanry commission in April 1859. He was Member of Parliament for Kingston upon Hull from 1857 to 1859 and Cricklade from 1859 to 1865. He was a patron and member of the Society for the Suppression of the Opium Trade.

On 7 June 1858, he was commissioned a lieutenant in the Antrim Royal Rifle Regiment of Militia. On 16 March 1860, he was commissioned a lieutenant in the 2nd (South Middlesex) Rifle Volunteer Corps (RVC). He resigned his commission in the South Middlesex on 6 September 1860 to become a Captain in the 28th (London Irish) Middlesex RVC on 17 September.

On 7 September 1860, he was promoted to a captaincy in the Antrim Militia, which he resigned in early 1862. He resigned his commission in the London Irish Rifles on 1 April 1863. On 6 February 1862, he was promoted Lieutenant-Colonel of the Dorset Militia, a position he held until 1 June 1872.

On 12 May 1875, he was appointed Lieutenant-commanding of the London Corps of Royal Naval Artillery Volunteers (RNAV), and on 7 June 1880, he became honorary commander of the London Brigade, RNAV.

== Family ==
Lord Shaftesbury married Lady Harriet Augusta Anna Seymourina Chichester (d. 14 April 1898), only daughter (and only surviving child) of the 3rd Marquess of Donegall, on 22 August 1857. They had six children:

- Lady Margaret Emily Ashley-Cooper (1858–1931), married Captain Theophilus Levett, son of Theophilus John Levett MP.
- Lady Evelyn Harriet Ashley-Cooper (1865–1931), married firstly the 2nd Baron Magheramorne, and secondly Captain Hugo Baring (sixth son of the 1st Baron Revelstoke)
- Lady Mildred Georgiana Ashley-Cooper (1867–1958), married George Allsopp.
- Lady (Susan) Violet Ashley-Cooper (1868–1938), married the 12th Earl of Mar.
- Anthony Ashley-Cooper, 9th Earl of Shaftesbury (1869–1961), married Lady Constance Grosvenor, elder daughter of Earl Grosvenor, eldest son of the 1st Duke of Westminster.
- Lady Ethel Maud Ashley-Cooper (1870–1945), married Sir George Warrender – she was known as Lady Maud Warrender, a singer and patron of music, and a personal friend of the composer Sir Edward Elgar and his wife.

In his father's lifetime, as Lord Ashley, he was a disappointing heir apparent, constantly running up debts with his extravagant wife.

== Death ==
Lord Shaftesbury committed suicide, on 13 April 1886, six months after succeeding to the title. He shot himself with a revolver while in a cab in Regent Street, London.

Parliament of the United Kingdom
| Preceded by William Digby Seymour; James Clay | Member of Parliament for Kingston upon Hull; 1857–1859; With: James Clay | Succeeded by Joseph Hoare; James Clay |
| Preceded by John Neeld; John Neeld | Member of Parliament for Cricklade; 1859–1865; With: Ambrose Lethbridge Goddard | Succeeded by Sir Daniel Gooch; Ambrose Lethbridge Goddard |
Peerage of England
| Preceded by Anthony Ashley-Cooper | Earl of Shaftesbury; 1885–1886 | Succeeded by Anthony Ashley-Cooper |
