= Thomas Goddard (Cricklade MP) =

British soldier & politician (1777-1814)

Member of Parliament for Cricklade
- In office 1806–1812

Personal details
- Born: 9 August 1777
- Died: 3 January 1814 (aged 36)
- Parent: Ambrose Goddard (father)

Thomas Goddard (9 August 1777 – 3 January 1814) was the member of Parliament for Cricklade in England from 1806 to 1812.

He was a captain in the 2nd Wiltshire Militia in 1796, and a major in 1799. In 1800 he was a captain in the Swindon Yeomanry.

He was a member of the Goddard family associated with Wiltshire, Hampshire and Berkshire and the son of Ambrose Goddard.
