= Joseph Moser =

English artist, author and magistrate (1748–1819)

Joseph Moser (1748 – 22 May 1819) was an English artist, author, and magistrate. He was a nephew of George Michael Moser, enamel painter and drawing-master to George III. He exhibited at the Royal Academy from 1774 to 1782. He was made magistrate for Westminster in 1794 and published political pamphlets, dramas, and fiction.

== Life ==
Moser was of Swiss descent, the son of Hans Jacob Moser, an artist. He was born in Greek Street, Soho, Westminster. While still quite young he was placed with his uncle, George Moser, to train at the Royal Academy as an artist in enamel. Moser did not intend to follow this profession, though he remained in the Royal Academy until his marriage to Elizabeth Liege in 1780. From then on he devoted himself to literature.

He was made a magistrate in 1794. In 1808 he was presiding magistrate in the case of James Hardy Vaux following the latter's arrest for the theft of a silver snuff box, and a vivid account of the courtroom examination is preserved in Vaux's memoirs. Moser died in Romney Street, Westminster.

== Partial list of works ==
- Lucifer and Mammon 1793
- Turkish Tales 1794
- Anecdotes of Richard Brothers 1795
- The Hermit of Caucasus 1797
- Moral Tales 1797
