= Richard Goddard (died 1732) =

18th-century English politician

Richard Goddard (1676–1732), of Swindon, Wiltshire, was an English politician.

He was a member (MP) of the parliament of Great Britain for Wootton Bassett from 1710 to 1713 and for Wiltshire from 1722 to 1727.
