= Daniel Gooch =

English railway locomotive and transatlantic cable engineer

Sir Daniel Gooch Bt
- Born: 24 August 1816; Bedlington, Northumberland, England
- Died: 15 October 1889 (aged 73)
- Occupations: Railway locomotive engineer, transatlantic cable engineer
- Spouses: Margaret Tanner (m. 1838; died 1868); Emily Burder (m. 1870)
- Engineering career
- Projects: Great Western Railway; Transatlantic telegraph cable

Sir Daniel Gooch, 1st Baronet (24 August 1816 – 15 October 1889) was an English railway locomotive and transatlantic cable engineer. He was the first Superintendent of Locomotive Engines on the Great Western Railway from 1837 to 1864 and its chairman from 1865 until his death in 1889.

Between 1865 and 1885 Gooch was Conservative MP for Cricklade.

== Early life ==
Gooch was born in Bedlington, Northumberland, the son of John Gooch, an iron founder, and his wife, Anna Longridge. In 1831 his family moved to Tredegar Ironworks, Monmouthshire, South Wales, where his father had accepted a managerial post, and it was there that Daniel would begin training under Thomas Ellis senior, who together with Ironmaster Samuel Homfray and Richard Trevithick pioneered steam railway locomotion. Gooch wrote in his diaries "Large works of this kind are by far the best school for a young engineer to get a general knowledge of what he needs in after life." and "...I look back upon the time spent at Tredegar as by far the most important years of my life...".

He trained in engineering with a variety of companies, including a period with Robert Stephenson and Company, in Newcastle upon Tyne, as a draughtsman. At the age of 20 he was recruited by Isambard Kingdom Brunel for the Great Western Railway, under the title "Superintendent of Locomotive Engines", taking office on 18 August 1837.

While working in Newcastle he met his future wife, Margaret Tanner, the daughter of Henry Tanner, a Sunderland shipowner.

== Railway engineer ==
In Gooch's earliest days with the Great Western Railway, he struggled to keep the miscellaneous collection of 7 ft 1/4 in (2,140 mm) broad gauge steam locomotives previously ordered by Brunel in working order. When working at Robert Stephenson and Company, he had helped design two 5 ft 6 in (1,676 mm) gauge locomotives for the New Orleans Railway, which had never been delivered. Gooch persuaded Brunel to buy the two locomotives, North Star and Morning Star, and had Stephenson convert them to 7 ft 1/4 in (2,140 mm) gauge before delivery.

As the only reliable locomotives that the company had at that time, they were the basis of the GWR Star Class. He and Brunel improved the blastpipe arrangement of the North Star to improve its fuel efficiency. Eventually Gooch moved on from the Star class and designed the new GWR Firefly Class of 2-2-2 express passenger locomotives, introduced in 1840.

In comparative trials by the Gauge Commissioners, Ixion of this class proved capable of speeds greater than its 4 ft 8 1/2 in (1,435 mm) standard gauge challenger. In 1843 Gooch introduced a new form of locomotive valve gear.

In 1840, Gooch was responsible for identifying the site of Swindon Works and in 1846 for designing the first complete locomotive to be constructed there, Great Western, prototype of the GWR Iron Duke Class of 4-2-2 locomotives, which were able to achieve 70 miles per hour (110 km/h). Much renewed, they lasted to the end of the GWR broad gauge era.

Although Gooch's locomotives were principally for the broad gauge, between 1854 and 1864 he also had to design a number of standard gauge classes for the GWR's new Northern Division. At the end of September 1864, he resigned from his post of Locomotive Superintendent, though he continued as a member of the GWR Board.

== Cable engineer and other roles ==
From 1859, Gooch lived at Clewer Park in Windsor and was a Deputy Lieutenant for Berkshire.

In 1865, he was recalled to the Great Western Railway Company as chairman, replacing Richard Potter in November 1865; he remained chairman until his death in October 1889, when F.G. Saunders was elected to succeed him. He was also chief engineer of the Telegraph Construction and Maintenance Company.

In this role, he was instrumental in laying the first successful transatlantic telegraph cable, using the SS Great Eastern (1865/66). On completion of the cable, on 27 July 1866, Gooch, who was on the Great Eastern, sent a cable message to the Secretary of State for Foreign Affairs, Lord Stanley, saying "Perfect communication established between England and America; God grant it will be a lasting source of benefit to our country."

== Daniel Gooch and the Swindon Railway Village ==
Daniel Gooch played a key role in the foundation of the GWR Medical Fund Society (MFS) and in the building of the New Swindon Mechanics Institute (MI). These institutions played a key role in the life of the Swindon Railway Village (SRV) - the MFS from 1847 to 1947 and the MI from 1843 to 1986.

Daniel Gooch Statue GWR Park Swindon

In 1847, Daniel Gooch, prompted by workers in the Swindon Works, wrote to the secretary of the GWR company, about the state of affairs in the SRV - with an outbreak of smallpox, frequent industrial accidents and lay-offs of workers. As a result, the MFS was founded, funded from rail workers' pay packets. Comprehensive cradle to grave care was developed over the years. The Armoury was converted to be the GWR Hospital and the Baths and Dispensary (now the Health Hydro) were built in the SRV. The GWR Hospital was founded in 1871, to which Gooch donated £1,000.

On 1st September 1853, Daniel Gooch proposed to the GWR board that a Mechanics Institute building and a market building be built and the foundations were laid in 1854.

== Political career ==
In 1865, while out of the country laying the cable, Gooch was elected Conservative MP for Cricklade. He held the seat until 1885. During his time as MP, he never addressed Parliament; he noted this in his diary when Parliament was dissolved on 18 November 1885 with the comment "It would be a great advantage to business if there were a greater number who followed my example."

== Later business activities ==
In 1866 Gooch was created a baronet in recognition of his cable work.

In 1868, he became chairman of the Telegraph Construction & Maintenance Company after John Pender, the first chairman, resigned. He led the Great Western Railway out of near-bankruptcy and took a interest in construction of the Severn Tunnel. Abandonment of the last remaining sections of the broad gauge happened in May 1892, three years after his death in 1889 at the age of 73.

From 1850 on he was an active Freemason, holding office and founding a number of Lodges.

== Family ==
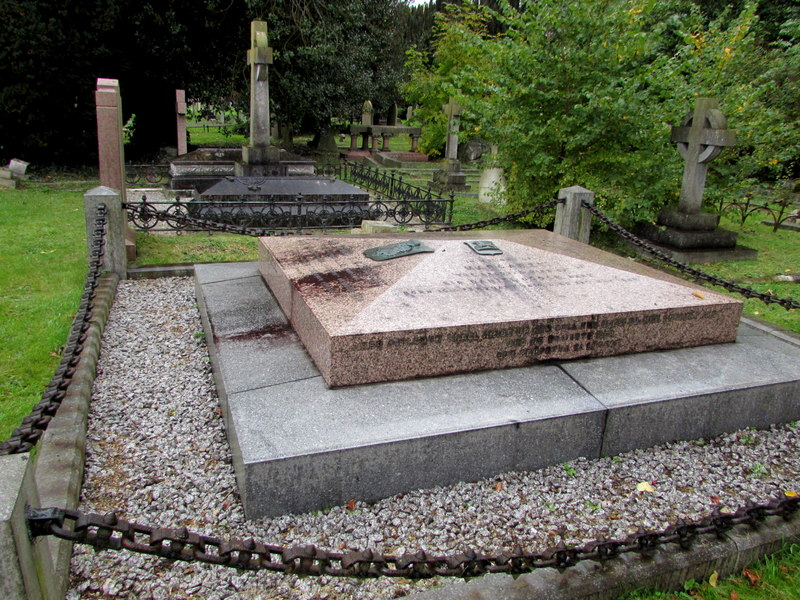
Gooch's grave at St Andrew's church in Clewer

Gooch married Margaret Tanner in 1838; they had six children: Anna (1839), Emily (1849), Henry (1841), Charles (1845), Alfred (1846) and Frank (1847). Following Margaret's death in 1868, he married Emily Burder in 1870; she died in 1901.

His elder brothers, Thomas, John, and younger brother William, were also railway engineers.

== Legacy ==
GWR Castle Class steam locomotive no. 5070 and British Rail Western Region class 47 diesel locomotive no. D1663 (later 47078, then 47628) were both named Sir Daniel Gooch. Continuing with this tradition, the present Great Western Railway company has named class 800 no. 800004 after Gooch; it runs on the line that Gooch helped to create.

A pub in Bayswater, London was named the Daniel Gooch; it closed in 2016. The Sir Daniel Arms, a Wetherspoons pub in Swindon, is also named after Gooch, as is Gooch Street in the same town, one of several streets built to house Great Western railway workers.

== See also ==
- GWR locomotives by Gooch
- Daniel Gooch standard gauge locomotives
- Gooch valve gear
- Gooch Baronets of Clewer Park

== Notes ==
Business positions
Preceded by None	Superintendent of Locomotive Engines on the Great Western Railway; 1837 – 1864	Succeeded by Joseph Armstrong
Preceded by Richard Potter	Chairman of the Great Western Railway; 1865 – 1889	Succeeded by Frederick Saunders
Parliament of the United Kingdom
Preceded by Ambrose Lethbridge Goddard; Lord Ashley	Member of Parliament for Cricklade; 1865 – 1885; With: Ambrose Lethbridge Goddard 1865–1868; Frederick William Cadogan 1868–1874; Ambrose Lethbridge Goddard 1874–1880; Nevil Story-Maskelyne 1880–1885 (representation reduced to one member 1885)	Succeeded by Nevil Story-Maskelyne
Baronetage of the United Kingdom
New creation	Baronet (of Clewer Park); 1866 – 1889	Succeeded by Henry Daniel Gooch
