= Ambrose Goddard =

English politician (died 1815)

Ambrose Goddard (c.1727–1815) was a British merchant and landowner who sat in the House of Commons from 1772 to 1806.

Goddard was the third son of Ambrose Goddard and his wife Elizabeth Awdry, daughter of Ambrose Awdry of Seend, Wiltshire. He was educated at Winchester College from 1743 to 1745. He settled in Lisbon where he was involved in merchant activities and was an agent for the Post Office there until 1772. On the death of his elder brother in 1770, he succeeded to the family inheritance and returned to Wiltshire. He married Sarah Williams, daughter of Rev. Thomas Williams of Pilrowth, Carmarthenshire on 16 August 1776.

Goddard was returned as Member of Parliament for Wiltshire at a by-election on 21 August 1772 after a hard-fought and expensive contest. He was returned unopposed in 1774 and 1780. In 1784 he was a member of the St. Alban's Tavern group who tried to bring Fox and Pitt together. He held the seat until 1806.

Goddard died on 19 June 1815. He and his wife Sarah had three sons and seven daughters; from 1788 they employed Agnes Porter as governess. His sons Thomas Goddard and Ambrose Goddard became MPs for Cricklade.

== See also ==
- Goddard family of Wiltshire, Hampshire and Berkshire
