= Reclaim Fund =

Company that donates funds from dormant assets

- Company type: Non-profit state-owned enterprise
- Industry: Financial services
- Founded: August 2010; 15 years ago
- Founder: UK Government
- Headquarters: London, United Kingdom
- Area served: United Kingdom
- Key people: Adrian Smith (CEO)
- Services: Dormant Assets Scheme, charitable giving
- Owner: HM Treasury
- Website: reclaimfund.co.uk

Reclaim Fund Limited (RFL) is a not-for-profit company that was incorporated in August 2010 and is wholly owned by the UK Government's HM Treasury. RFL's primary activity is to manage dormant assets: financial organisations can transfer funds to RFL from dormant accounts and assets, to be allocated to good causes. RFL invests some of the funds to ensure that the original owners can reclaim their money and assets. RFL is registered with the Financial Conduct Authority.

RFL is independent of the government, with its own board of directors, but works within a framework set by ministers. The framework outlines the governance arrangements and the roles and responsibilities of RFL, HM Treasury (the shareholder), UK Government Investments (the shareholder's representative) and the Department for Culture, Media and Sport.

== History ==
Historically, financial institutions would attempt to trace the owners of dormant accounts, with the funds in these used by the businesses, in the usual way, to generate profits for shareholders. In 2005 the government announced it wanted to consider changing this, so the funds would be used for the good of communities. Between 2005 and 2007, Sir Ronald Cohen chaired a Commission on Unclaimed Assets, which made recommendations on how dormant account funds could be used to improve society. This laid the foundations for the legislation required to use dormant account funds for the good of society, and the scheme being launched in 2008.

The Dormant Bank and Building Society Accounts Act 2008 was enacted on 26 November 2008 to "make provision for, and in connection with, using money from dormant bank and building society accounts for social or environmental purposes". At inception, the aim was to distribute assets generated to provide opportunities for young people, to improve financial capability and to support institutions involved in social lending; the money was to be distributed by the Big Lottery Fund.

Subsequently, from 2011, RFL began to manage money from bank and building society accounts that had not been claimed for a minimum of 15 years. Banks and building societies were expected to make reasonable efforts to trace account holders before transferring the funds to RFL. The scheme provided account holders with the ability to reclaim funds transferred to RFL. Between 2011 and 2021 the rightful owners of the monies in these accounts only claimed £93m after funds had been transferred to RFL – less than 7% of the £1.35bn collected.

It was announced in 2018 that £330m in dormant assets would be spent on good causes over the next four years, with the priority areas for fund distribution being financial exclusion, youth unemployment and problem debt schemes, and with about a third of the money being allocated to "provide accommodation for homeless people and those with mental health conditions in England". At this point more than 25 banks and building societies were participating in the voluntary scheme including Barclays, HSBC, Lloyds, Royal Bank of Scotland, Nationwide, TSB, Santander and the Co-operative Bank.

Originally operating as a wholly owned subsidiary of Angel Square Investments Limited (ASIL), within the Co-operative Group, the Office for National Statistics reclassified RFL to be consolidated in the HM Treasury accounts and in March 2021 the shares in RFL were transferred from ASIL to the shareholder.

Later in 2021, the Department for Digital, Culture, Media and Sport decided to expand the scheme after a four-year review, to include insurance and pensions, investment and wealth management, and the securities sectors. In the following year the Dormant Assets Act 2022 was introduced. Between 2011 and 2022, £745m had been made available to social and environmental initiatives through the scheme; in 2023 it was estimated that the scheme's expansion would raise £880m for good causes. As a result of the expansion, in 2023 Aviva – who had worked with the government and others to expand the scheme – became the first insurer and pension sector company to transfer dormant assets.

By 2025, £1 billion had been donated to charities around the UK and more than 45 banks and building societies had joined the scheme. Gordon Brown, who was prime minister when the scheme was introduced, commented that: "The unclaimed assets scheme, which I had the privilege to introduce and which now includes 50 financial services firms, has made possible £1bn of investment to tackle some of the UK's most challenging social problems". To celebrate this milestone, RFL employees visited a recipient of the scheme in Blackpool, the Youth Futures Foundation, which works to improve employment opportunities for young people from disadvantaged groups; an organisation established in 2019 with a £90m initial endowment from RFL.

Priority areas for the scheme announced in 2025 included youth support, financial inclusion, social investment and community wealth, with the National Lottery Community Fund, Fair4AllFinance and Access – The Foundation for Social Investment responsible for delivering within these priority areas. London Youth welcomed an announcement by member of parliament Lisa Nandy that £132.5 million from dormant accounts would be available for the youth sector.

JPMorgan, Schroders, Janus Henderson and Jupiter became the first companies within the investment and wealth management sector to join the dormant asset scheme, in October 2025, with RFL CEO Adrian Smith commenting that: "The early adoption by Jupiter, JPMorgan, Janus Henderson, and Schroders reflects their commitment to social impact and strong ESG practice, without compromising the rights of their clients".

== Leadership ==
The chief executive officer (CEO) is Adrian Smith, who was involved in the project that led to the formation of RFL and has been CEO since 2011. On 11 July 2023, Lawrence M. Weiss commenced his appointment as chair of RFL, succeeding Jane Hanson.

== See also ==
- Better Society Capital
- MissingMoney.com
- Unclaimed funds
