= Better Society Capital =

UK social investment organisation

Better Society Capital Limited (BSC), formerly Big Society Capital, is a social impact investor in the United Kingdom, with a mission to grow the amount of money invested in tackling social issues and inequalities in the UK. It invests its own capital into a range of social purpose organisations, as well as enabling others to invest. Much of BSC's money comes from the Reclaim Fund, which was created in 2012 to make use of money in dormant bank accounts.

== Overview ==
Social impact investment is about lending or investing money to achieve a social, as well as, financial return. BSC was the world's first social investment institution of its kind, conceived under Gordon Brown's Labour government, then established in April 2012 by the Cabinet Office of the Cameron-Clegg ministry. It launched as an independent organisation with a £600m investment fund. The investment fund comes from dormant bank accounts via an independent Reclaim Fund and four leading UK high street banks. The institution was set up as part of the Dormant Bank and Building Society Accounts Act 2008, which defined BSC as an organization that exists "to enable other bodies to give financial or other support to third sector organisations". A third sector or a social sector organisation is "a body that exists to assist wholly or mainly for society or the environment".

Better Society Capital is a "social investment wholesaler". This means that BSC does not directly invest in frontline organisations, but in intermediaries such as banks and fund managers which provide finance and support to social sector organisations.

By 2024, BSC had invested a total of £925 million by reinvesting returns from initiatives backed by its original endowment, and had attracted nearly £3 billion in co-invested private capital.

=== Reclaim Fund ===
Banks and building societies in the UK transfer money from dormant accounts to Reclaim Fund Limited. This body keeps sufficient funds to meet reclaims from account holders, and passes surplus funds to the National Lottery Community Fund (formerly the Big Lottery Fund). The latter releases the English portion of these funds to the Oversight Trust to invest in Better Society Capital. When BSC was launched in 2012, £425 million was available from dormant accounts, alongside £200 million from four of the main UK banks; Barclays, HSBC, Lloyds Banking Group and The Royal Bank of Scotland (later NatWest) each invested £50 million in BSC.

In 2022, the Department for Culture, Media and Sport launched a consultation on how to allocate a further £880m of dormant assets and in March 2023 it was announced that social investment would continue to be one of the causes to receive dormant asset funding.

== Mission ==
Better Society Capital's mission is to grow the amount of money invested in tackling social issues and inequalities in the UK. It aims to make a transformative impact on the social investment market by supporting intermediaries to be financially robust and effectively channel capital to the social sector. More widely, it aims to increase awareness of, and confidence in, social investment by promoting best practice and sharing information; improving links between the social investment and mainstream financial markets; and working with other investors to embed social impact measurement and management into the investment decision-making and portfolio management processes.

== History ==
In 2000, Labour Chancellor Gordon Brown set up the Social Investment Task Force (SITF) to look at ways to create wealth and promote enterprise to support economic regeneration and community cohesion. The first report of the SITF highlighted the need for "wholesale intermediaries" to provide new sources of capital to help the community finance sector grow.

In 2005, an independent body, the Commission on Unclaimed Assets, was set up to consider how money left unclaimed in dormant bank accounts for over 15 years could be used to benefit society.

In a consultation paper published in July 2006, the Government recommended the establishment of a Social Investment Wholesale Bank.

In March 2007 the Commission published its report "Social Investment Bank – its organisation and role in driving development of the third sector", which provided a blueprint for the institution's funding, goals and governance. The commission's final report concluded that: 'the third sector urgently needs greater investment and professional support and suitable capital should be available for organisations at all stages of development.'

In 2008, the UK Government introduced legislation to enable unclaimed money in dormant bank accounts to be used for youth facilities, financial inclusion and social investment. The Dormant Bank and Building Society Accounts Act 2008 passed with cross-party support. It stated that money from dormant accounts available for spending in England could be used for three specified purposes, one of which was creating a 'Social Investment Wholesaler'.

In July 2009, Office of the Third Sector in the Cabinet Office consulted on the functions and design of this organisation. The idea of a Social Investment Wholesale Bank generated significant interest from across the political spectrum.

In March 2010, the Labour Government's Budget announced up to £75 million from the dormant accounts would be committed to a social investment fund.

On 31 March 2010, David Cameron announced that a Conservative government would set up a "Big Society Bank" funded by unclaimed bank assets as part of a Big Society initiative. A Conservative policy document said the proposed Big Society Bank would not be restricted to lending but would also invest in innovative products such as social impact bonds.

In July the same year, as Prime Minister, Cameron said: "We will create a Big Society Bank to help finance social enterprises, charities and volunteering groups through intermediaries… using every penny of dormant bank and building society account money allocated to England."

In 2011, the Merlin Agreement between the Government and the major UK high street banks included a commitment for the four largest banks to put £200 million into setting up the Big Society Bank. After consulting with key social sector organisations, Ronald Cohen (BCS's founder chair) and Nick O’Donohoe (BSC's CEO from 2011 to 2015) offered the Government an outline proposal for the Big Society Bank. Caroline Mason was BSC's chief operating officer until 2013. The proposal was accepted by the Cabinet Office subject to certain conditions, including regulatory approvals from both the EU Commission and the Financial Services Authority. An interim "Big Society Investment Fund" was set up under the auspices of the Big Lottery Fund to make investments before the new institution was launched.

In April 2012, Big Society Capital was launched by the Prime Minister at an event hosted by the London Stock Exchange.

In April 2024, the organisation was renamed to Better Society Capital to more accurately articulate its mission.

=== Reactions ===
The principle of BSC has met with criticism from diverse groups including banks and charities. Giving evidence to the Public Administration Select Committee, Thomas Hughes-Hallett, chief executive of the Marie Curie Cancer Care charity said: "it is potentially setting up a system to encourage vulnerable charities to borrow money." In January 2011 Banco Santander, who have major retail banking interests in the UK, withdrew from Project Merlin negotiations with the Government and is expected not to make any direct payments to the BSB.

The FT suggested that it was "a tiny acorn from which it is far from certain that a giant oak will grow. But there are some very exciting ideas ...which could help society and government tackle issues that have always struggled to obtain funding in the past"

Management Today said that "There's nothing wrong with the idea, or the model, or even the pot. But this plan still seems to lack some hard-headed commercial nous".

A heavier involvement with front line social sector organisations is something that others agree Better Society Capital needs to focus on. Others are equally worried about the direction of the social investment market overall, as they say that a lot of the noise around social investment has been from the perspective of investors rather than front line social organisations. Others point out that social finance will never be applicable to all of the social sector and Big Society Capital was established to make loans and not grants, a type of finance that will not necessarily be suitable for all.

== Corporate governance ==
Better Society Capital is an independent financial institution authorised by the Financial Conduct Authority. Independence is ensured by a structure which involves The Oversight Trust on whose board one Government representative serves. Big Society Capital is accountable to The Oversight Trust whose responsibility it is to ensure that Better Society Capital fulfills its mission.

== The Oversight Trust ==
The Oversight Trust is the majority shareholder in Better Society Capital, controlling 80% of the voting rights at shareholders' meetings. Its role is to ensure that Better Society Capital remains true to its mission. For important issues such as a change to the company's objects or removal of a Big Society Capital director, the consent of at least 75% of the Oversight Trust board is required. Big Society Capital reports regularly to the Oversight Trust on its financial performance, its investments and board and senior manager appointments. The Better Society Capital CEO is invited to attend The Oversight Trust board meetings as an observer.

== Shareholder banks ==
Barclays, HSBC, Lloyds Banking Group and RBS are shareholder banks. Each shareholder bank has committed to subscribe to £50 million of Better Society Capital's shares; their individual shareholding will always be less than 10% of the outstanding paid-in capital. The banks can vote at shareholders' meetings. Their votes are in proportion to their shareholding, but each is capped at 5% of the overall voting rights. The banks are represented on the Better Society Capital board by a bank-nominated director. In addition to information provided to them by the BSC Director, the banks receive all Big Society Capital board papers and quarterly and half yearly reports. In certain circumstances the banks have the right to request a meeting with the senior management of Better Society Capital to discuss its performance.

== Investment categories ==
The investments made by Better Society Capital fall into these broad categories:

1. Specialised funds – These funds have "themes", for example, they might be for investing in specific social outcomes such as health and social care or a particular geographical area. Alternatively, they could invest in supporting specific types of contracts won by social sector organisations.
2. General funds – These funds increase the supply of capital available to a wide range of frontline organisations.
3. Social Impact Bonds (SIBs) – A way of raising finance to deliver payment-by-results (PbR) contracts. Big Society Capital can invest directly in entities that are set up to take responsibility for funding and the delivery of outcomes detailed by PbR contracts.
4. Operating intermediaries – These are organisations that provide support for the social sector, such as performance measurement and capital raising.

== Investment activity ==
Better Society Capital was set up to receive equity capital from dormant bank accounts of up to £400m and £200m from the shareholder banks (Barclays, HSBC, Lloyds Banking Group and RBS). During:

- 2012, £119.4 million of equity capital was received, £71.7 million from the dormant bank accounts via the Reclaim Fund Limited and £47.7 million from the shareholder banks.
- 2013, £106.0 million of equity capital was received, £63.7 million from the dormant bank accounts via the Reclaim Fund Limited and £42.3 million from the shareholder banks.
- 2014, £24.6 million equity capital was received, £14.8 million from the dormant bank accounts via the Reclaim Fund Limited and £9.8 million from the shareholder banks, taking total equity capital to £250.0 million. The balance of equity capital was due to be received over the next four years.

Better Society Capital has made allocations to charities and social enterprises.

- During 2016, £893 million was allocated by BSC and its co-investors, £340 million of which was funding from BSC.
- During 2017, £764 million of the £1.1 billion BSC and its co-investors allocated was drawn down. BSC made 19 investments with a combined value of £94 million and it made a net profit of £800,000, the first time it had recorded a surplus.
