= Caroline Mason (charity executive) =

British financial entrepreneur

Dame Caroline Louise Mason DBE has been the chief executive officer of the Esmée Fairbairn Foundation since 2013, a UK charity that supports improvement of life through strategic grants and investment.

== Career ==
Mason (married surname Cooper) studied Spanish and Portuguese at University of Bristol from 1982 to 1986 and after graduating she worked for the Reuters news agency until 1998. After leaving Reuters she worked until 2004 as a consultant, including with Pragmetrics and Tullett-Prebon.

In 2005 she was the co-founder, with Geoff Burnand, of an early UK community interest company called Investing for Good, a social investment finance intermediary. The objective was to bring together investors, social organisations and expertise so that investment loans could have social as well as financial benefits. In 2011 she was appointed as the chief operating officer of the Charity Bank and Big Society Capital Ltd. The latter was set up by the UK government for social investment using money that was dormant in UK bank accounts to provide loans via intermediaries for charities.

In 2013 she became the chief executive officer of the Esmée Fairbairn Foundation, which makes grants and loans to organisations aiming to improve the quality of life in the UK, especially when this does not fit within the remit of other funders. In 2020, the charity changed to only provide support for projects on the natural world, removing structural inequality and improving communities rather than simply responding to requests.

Mason is also a member of the boards that govern the UK government's Environment Agency and the Impact Investing Institute.

== Honours and awards ==
Mason was appointed Commander of the Order of the British Empire (CBE) in 2013 for services to social investment and Dame Commander of the Order of the British Empire (DBE) in the 2021 New Year Honours for services to the charity sector, particularly during the Covid-19 response.

In November 2020 she was included in the BBC Radio 4 Woman's Hour Power list 2020.
