= Chancellorship of John Healey =

John Healey's tenure at HM Treasury (2026-present)

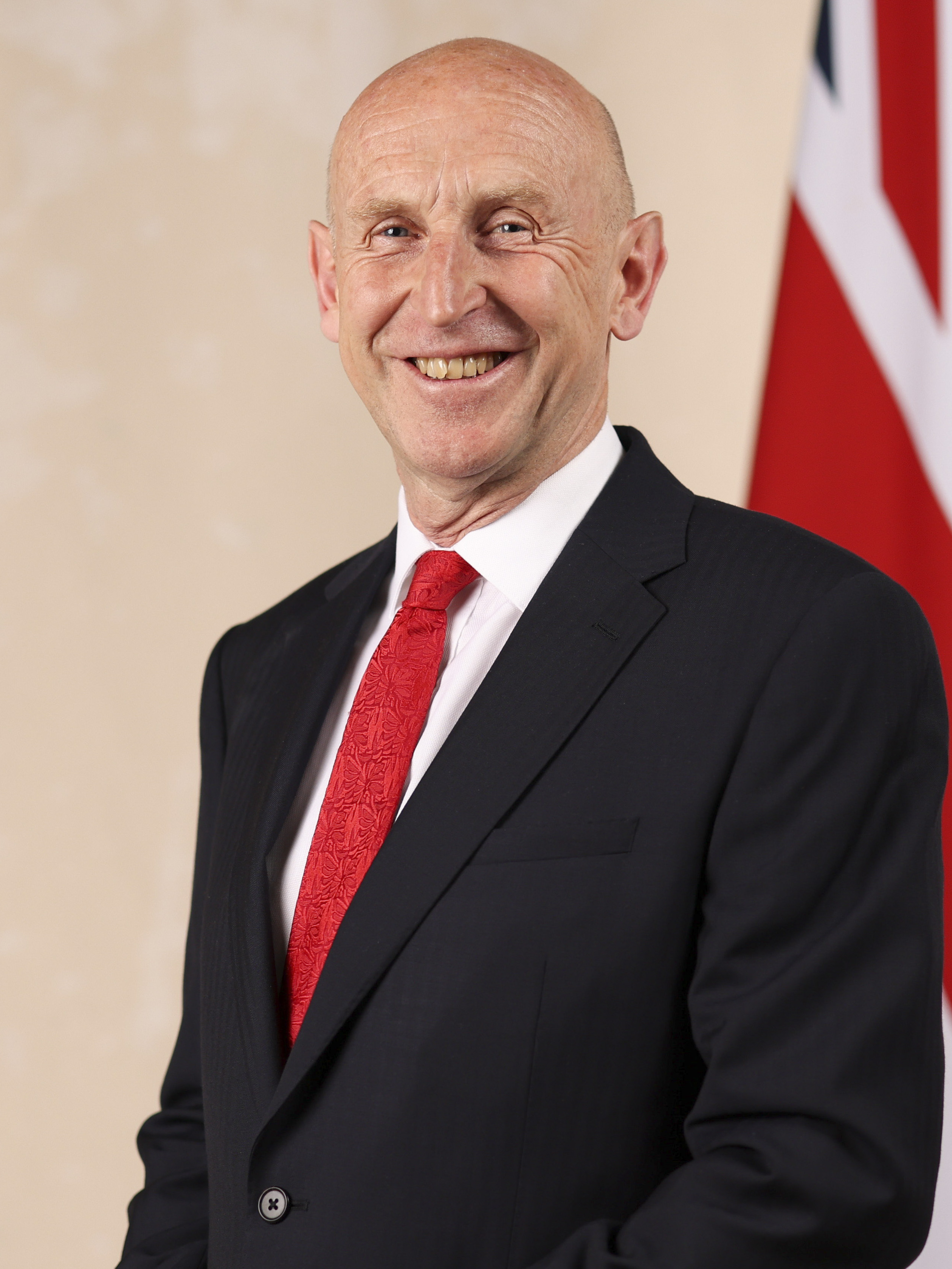
- Official portrait, July 2024
- Chancellorship of John Healey; 20 July 2026 – present
- Chancellor: John Healey
- Party: Labour
- Nominated by: Andy Burnham
- Appointed by: Charles III
- Seat: 11 Downing Street

John Healey became Chancellor of the Exchequer on 20 July 2026, upon his appointment by Prime Minister Andy Burnham, succeeding Rachel Reeves.

== Tenure ==
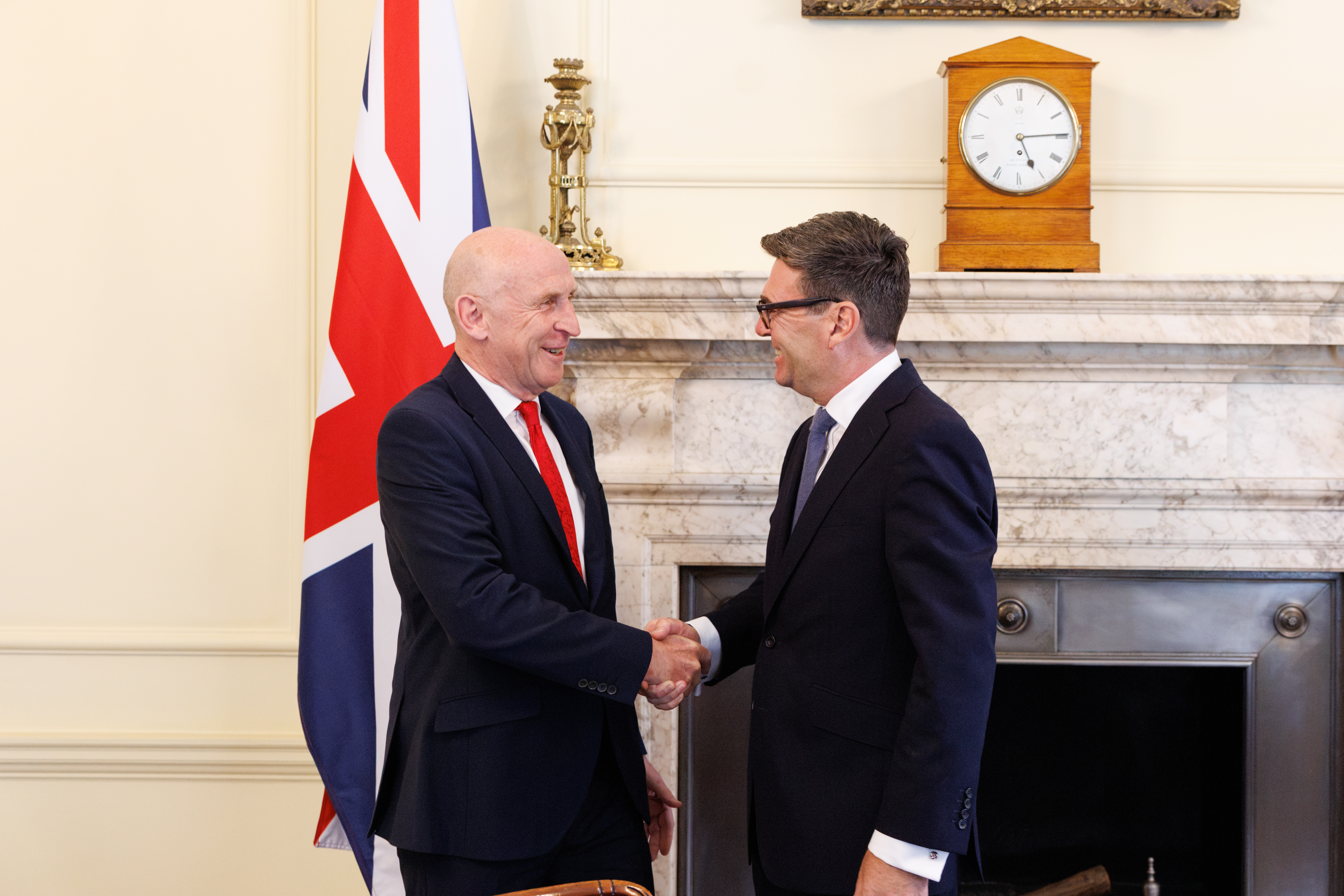
Healey being appointed as Chancellor of the Exchequer by Prime Minister Andy Burnham on 20 July 2026.

On 20 July 2026, Andy Burnham appointed Healey as Chancellor of the Exchequer, succeeding Rachel Reeves.

Burnham told NATO Secretary General Mark Rutte in a phone call that appointing a former Defence Secretary as Chancellor of the Exchequer was "a signal of [Burnham's] intent" to send a "strong signal of unity [...] to the world in such volatile times".

On 7 September 2026, Healey delivered his first major speech as Chancellor at the Manufacturing Technology Centre in Coventry. Healey argued that the government needed to remove what he described as unnecessary barriers to investment and development.

Before becoming Chancellor, Healey had been a prominent advocate of increased defence expenditure, while serving as Defence Secretary in Keir Starmer's government. However, reports indicate that Healey will delay his previous 3% of GDP defence-spending target for 2030, with the government instead maintaining its longer-term commitment to reach 3.5% of GDP by 2035.

In September 2026, Healey announced a new £150 million British Business Bank fund for high-growth companies in northern England. The fund is designed to provide larger-scale investment, with individual investments expected to range between £5 million and £15 million.

Healey presented his first budget to the House of the Commons in October 2026.
