= Chancellorship of Winston Churchill =

Winston Churchill's tenure at HM Treasury (1924–1929)

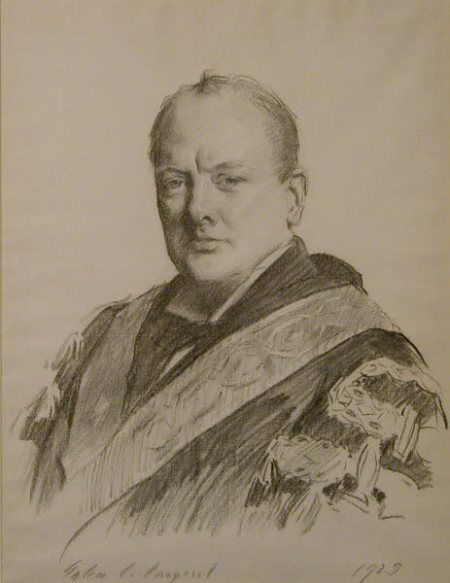
- Churchill in 1925
- Chancellorship of Winston Churchill; 6 November 1924 – 4 June 1929
- Party: Conservative
- Nominated by: Stanley Baldwin
- Appointed by: George V
- Seat: 11 Downing Street

Winston Churchill was appointed Chancellor of the Exchequer in 1924 and served until 1929. He presented five budgets during his chancellorship. He was initially sceptical about advice from the Bank of England and leading economists to implement a return to the gold standard. In April 1925, however, he agreed to include the measure in his first budget. It resulted in deflation and unemployment, and was a catalyst to the miners' strike that led to the General Strike of 1926. Churchill's other policies as Chancellor included free trade, a reduction in the rate of local taxation, lowering the pension age and support for coal miners and the mining industry.

== Appointment ==
Having been a Member of Parliament (MP) since October 1900, Winston Churchill lost his seat at the November 1922 general election and was out of Parliament for nearly two years until successfully standing at Epping in the October 1924 general election. He had been a member of the Liberal Party since May 1904 but he now agreed to rejoin the Conservative Party, who were victorious in the 1924 election, and was appointed Chancellor of the Exchequer by the new Prime Minister, Stanley Baldwin.

Churchill was actually second choice for the Treasury as Baldwin initially offered it to Neville Chamberlain, who declined because he wished to serve as Minister of Health, furthering his ambitions of reform in not only health but also housing, local government and the elimination of poverty. Roy Jenkins commented that, the appointment being a surprise, it should have inculcated in Churchill both a respect for Conservative Party ideals and a cautionary approach to a job that he knew little about. Churchill's self-confidence, however, was so pronounced that he showed no such respect or caution. In August 1925, Chamberlain sent a letter to Baldwin in which he described Churchill as "mercurial" and "(not) what he was expected to be". In addition, however, he praised Churchill's sense of humour, his vitality, his loyalty and greatest of all his oratory – "a tower of debating strength in the House of Commons".

Becoming Chancellor on 6 November 1924, Churchill moved into 11 Downing Street and formally rejoined the Conservative Party. He was due to present his first budget on 28 April 1925. He had always subscribed to economic liberalism and, as Chancellor, he intended to pursue his free trade principles. In January 1925, he negotiated a series of war repayments, both from the UK to the US, and from other countries to the UK.

== The gold standard ==
The Bank of England and others were calling for the UK to return to the gold standard, an idea Churchill initially opposed. He consulted various economists, the majority of whom endorsed the change; among the few who opposed it was John Maynard Keynes. Churchill ultimately relented and agreed to the measure, after which he became its supporter. In his first budget, he controversially announced the return to the gold standard at its 1914 parity of £4.25 to the ounce, the rate set by Isaac Newton in 1717, equivalent to £1 = $4.86. The principal opponent of the proposal was the economist John Maynard Keynes who argued that the measure would lead to a world depression. Keynes later wrote a pamphlet entitled The Economic Consequences of Mr Churchill. Jenkins has pointed out that, as Churchill was a reluctant convert to gold, it is unfair to blame him entirely for the consequences, but it was in the end his decision to implement the measure and he was the one person who could have refused to do so.

The return to gold at the 1914 parity is widely held to have caused deflation and resultant unemployment with a devastating impact on the coal industry in particular – the higher rate of the pound reduced the demand for already declining coal exports. The mineowners reacted by announcing a national lock-out from 31 July unless the miners accepted a substantial wage reduction. Neither Baldwin nor Churchill wanted a conflict and they agreed to initiate a royal commission on the industry's future. This was led by Herbert Samuel. Its report was not presented until 11 March 1926, six weeks before Churchill's second budget (on 26 April) and less than two months before the outbreak of the General Strike on 4 May.

While the commission deliberated, Baldwin asked Churchill to introduce a subsidy for the mining industry to prevent the reduction of wages as a result of lower income. Churchill agreed and the total subsidy paid was calculated to be £19 million. Samuel's commission made proposals which were mostly in favour of the miners, especially rejection of the mineowners' demand for longer hours at less pay. However, the commission held that retention of the seven-hour working day would entail some reduction in wages because of the prevailing economic crisis, in which the most serious issue was the falling price index.

== General Strike ==
During the General Strike, Churchill edited the British Gazette, the government's anti-strike propaganda newspaper. After the strike ended, he acted as an intermediary between the striking miners and the mine owners. He proposed that any lowering of wages should be paralleled by a reduction in the owners' profits but no compromise could be reached and Churchill became an advocate of the miners' calls for the introduction of a legally binding minimum wage.

== Visit to Rome ==
In January 1927, Churchill went to the Mediterranean for an extended holiday which included visits to Malta, Greece and Italy. In Rome, he twice met Mussolini for whom he was then full of admiration, given Mussolini's stand against Leninism. Roy Jenkins says that Churchill's statements about Mussolini were "much too friendly". Controversially, Churchill claimed that Mussolini's fascism had "rendered a service to the whole world", showing, as it had, "a way to combat subversive forces" – that is, he considered Mussolini's regime to be a bulwark against the perceived threat of Communist revolution and he even called the dictator a "Roman genius (who was) the greatest lawgiver among men".

== Later budgets ==
Churchill's second budget, presented in April 1926 before the strike, included taxes on petrol, heavy lorries and luxury car purchase. In April 1927, his third budget included new taxes on imported car tyres and wines, and increased taxation on matches and tobacco. Later, he proposed abolition of local rates to relieve taxation on British industry and agriculture; eventually, after Cabinet criticism, he agreed to a two-thirds reduction and the scheme was included in his April 1928 budget. In April 1929, he presented his fifth and final budget including abolition of duty on tea.

== Criticism of Churchill as Chancellor ==
It was not only the return to the gold standard that both contemporary and future economists criticised in Churchill's time at the Treasury. Greater emphasis was placed on his overall approach to budget measures because he was seen to be aiding the more prosperous banking and salaried classes, with whom the Conservative Party is expressly aligned, at the expense of manufacturers and exporters who were under pressure from buoyant import competition in what had been their traditional export markets. In Churchill's defence, however, he was constrained by party consensus at the time that budgets must ensure balance in the economy. As a result, his scope for economic initiative was restricted. Even so, the 1925 budget was well received by the public and enhanced Churchill's prestige.

== Bibliography ==
- Gilbert, Martin (1991). Churchill: A Life. London: Heinemann. ISBN 978-04-34291-83-0.
- Jenkins, Roy (2001). Churchill. London: Macmillan Press. ISBN 978-03-30488-05-1.
- Rhodes James, Robert (1970). Churchill: A Study in Failure 1900–1939. London: Weidenfeld & Nicolson. ISBN 978-02-97820-15-4.
