= Philip de Willoughby =

Sir Philip de Willoughby (died 12 October 1305), was lieutenant of the Treasurer, Baron of the Exchequer of England, Chancellor of the Exchequer between 1283-1305 and was the keeper of the wardrobe to The Lord Edward between 1269-1274 and Dean of Lincoln between 1288 and 1305.

== Life ==
Philip followed Lord Edward on the Ninth Crusade to the Holy Land in 1270, returning in 1274 and surrendered his office on 18 October 1274 after the coronation of King Edward I of England. On 22 September 1274, Edward I appointed Willoughby exchequer beyond Trent. By 1278, Willoughby was Baron of the Exchequer of England and was appointed on 11 April 1283, Chancellor of the Exchequer. Phillip died on 12 October 1305.
