= Harry Specters =

British chocolate company

Coordinates: 52°23′20″N 0°15′45″E

Harry Specters is a UK-based artisan chocolate company and social enterprise headquartered in Ely, Cambridgeshire. Founded in 2012 by Mona Shah MBE, and Shaz Shah, the company aims to provide employment and training opportunities for autistic individuals through the production of handcrafted chocolates.

The company combines commercial chocolate production with a social impact model focused on improving employment outcomes for neurodivergent people. It reports that for every £1 spent, approximately 69p of social value is generated through its activities (based on Cost Benefit Analysis).

Harry Specter's products received one Three-Star rating and two One-Star awards in the Guild of Fine Food's Great Taste Awards for 2014. As well, the Guardian ranked their chocolate Easter egg as the best chocolate made by a social enterprise in 2014.

As of 2026, the company has helped 350+ autistic people through paid work and free work experience. In addition the company has won the following awards:

- A total of 35 awards for their chocolates from Guild of Fine Food and Academy of Chocolate.
- Kings Award for Enterprise - Promoting Opportunity, 2024.
- Community Business of the Year Award - Ely, 2023.
- National Food & Drink Competition winner - ALDI & Channel 4, 2022
- Cambridgeshire Business Awards 2022 - Diversity & Inclusion Great British Entrepreneur Award - Regional Winner London & East of England, 2020
- Social Entrepreneur of the Year Award (UK) - Citi - 2017/18.

== History ==
Harry Specters was established in 2012 by Mona and Shaz Shah, inspired by their experiences as parents of an autistic son. The company was named by their son, who suggested the name “Harry Specters” at the age of 14.

Initially operating as a small artisan chocolatier from the back of Mona's house, the business continues to produce chocolates in small batches with a focus on craftsmanship and quality. Over time, it has expanded its product range and developed its direct-to-consumer and corporate gifting operations.

== Social Impact ==
A central objective of Harry Specters is to improve employment opportunities for autistic individuals, a group that faces significant barriers to entering the workforce.

As of 2025, the company reports that it has supported over 350 autistic individuals through a combination of paid employment and structured work experience programmes. Its model focuses on developing workplace skills, confidence, and independence.

The company states that 60% of its profits are reinvested into its social mission. It also reports that for every £1 spent with the business, approximately 69p of social value is created, based on cost–benefit analysis methodologies that consider employment outcomes and reduced reliance on public services.

== Products ==
Harry Specters produces a range of artisan chocolate products, including filled chocolates, bars, and seasonal collections. Its offerings include:

- Assorted chocolate selection boxes
- Seasonal products such as Easter eggs and advent calendars
- Bespoke corporate gifting products
- Subscription-based chocolate boxes - included in BBC GoodFood's list of 'Best Chocolate Subscriptions' for 2025.

The company emphasises small-batch production, flavour development, and handcrafted finishing techniques.

== Founder Recognition ==
In 2025, company founder Mona Shah was appointed a Member of the Order of the British Empire (MBE) for services to training and employment for autistic people.
