= Dormant Bank and Building Society Accounts Act 2008 =

Act of the Parliament of the United Kingdom

Dormant Bank and Building Society Accounts Act 2008 (Note: Section 32.)
- Act of Parliament
- Parliament of the United Kingdom
- Long title: An Act to make provision for, and in connection with, using money from dormant bank and building society accounts for social or environmental purposes.
- Citation: 2008 c. 31
- Introduced by: Angela Eagle (Commons); Lord Davies of Oldham (Lords)
- Territorial extent: England and Wales; Scotland; Northern Ireland; (Note: Section 30.)

Dates
- Royal assent: 26 November 2008
- Commencement: 26 November 2008 (except parts 1 and 2); 12 March 2009 (parts 1 and 2); (Note: Section 31. The Dormant Bank and Building Society Accounts Act 2008 (Commencement and Transitional Provisions) Order 2009)
Other legislation
| Amends | National Lottery etc. Act 1993; Financial Services and Markets Act 2000 |
| Amended by | Financial Services and Markets Act 2000 (Permissions, Transitional Provisions and Consequential Amendments) (Northern Ireland Credit Unions) Order 2011; Financial Services Act 2012; Transfer of Functions (Elections, Referendums, Third Sector and Information) Order 2016; EEA Passport Rights (Amendment, etc., and Transitional Provisions) (EU Exit) Regulations 2018; Dormant Assets Act 2022 |

Status: Amended

History of passage through Parliament

Text of statute as originally enacted

Revised text of statute as amended

The Dormant Bank and Building Society Accounts Act 2008 (c. 31) is an act of the Parliament of the United Kingdom.

== Provisions ==
It authorises the distribution, by the Big Lottery Fund, of assets from cash accounts that are considered dormant. A bank account is considered dormant if it has not been accessed in 15 years.

== Commencement ==
Parts 1 and 2 came into force on 12 March 2009. Part 3 came into force on 26 November 2008.

== Further developments ==
The legislation became part of the Big Society policy under the Cameron-Clegg coalition.

Charities to have received funding under the act include Age UK, Harrogate Skills 4 Living Centre and Harry Specters.

As of August 2024, the scheme has released £745,000,000.

== See also ==
- Building Societies Act
