= Lost, mislaid, and abandoned property =

Area of law dealing with personal property not possessed by anyone

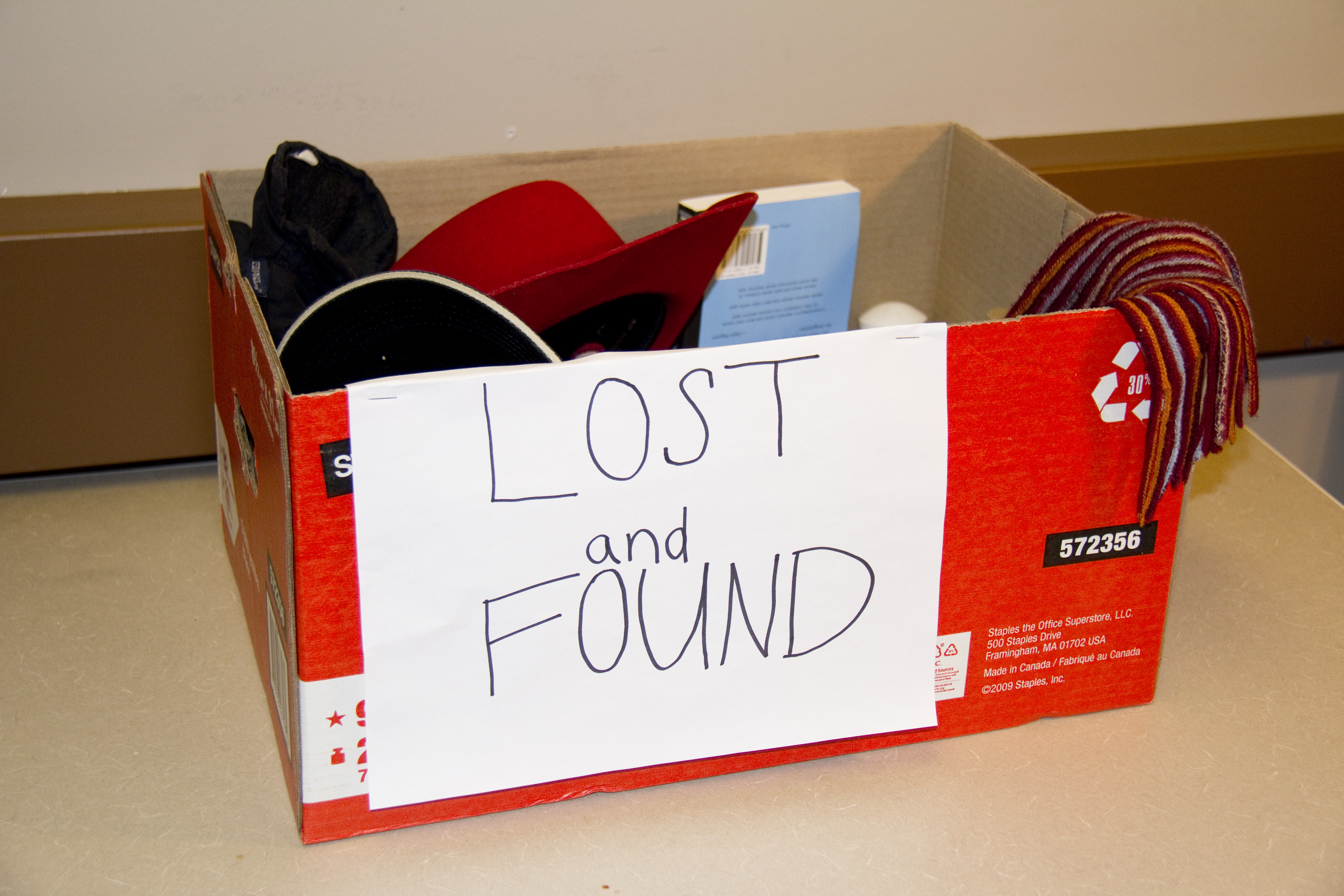
A "lost and found" box containing a book, a scarf, a hat, a spinning top and other items

In property law, lost, mislaid, and abandoned property are categories of the common law of property which deals with personal property or chattel which has left the possession of its rightful owner without having directly entered the possession of another person. Property can be considered lost, mislaid, or abandoned depending on the circumstances under which it is found by the next party who obtains its possession.

An old saying is that "possession is nine-tenths of the law", dating back centuries. This means that in most cases, the possessor of a piece of property is its rightful owner without evidence to the contrary. More colloquially, these may be called finders, keepers. The contradiction to this principle is theft by finding, which may occur if conversion occurs after finding someone else's property.

The rights of a finder of such property are determined in part by the status in which it is found. Because these classifications have developed under the common law of England, they turn on nuanced distinctions. The general rule attaching to the three types of property may be summarized as: "A finder of property acquires no rights in mislaid property, is entitled to possession of lost property against everyone except the true owner, and is entitled to keep abandoned property." This rule varies by jurisdiction.

== Lost property ==
Property is generally deemed to have been lost if it is found in a place where the true owner likely did not intend to set it down and where it is not likely to be found by the true owner. At common law, the finder of a lost item could claim the right to possess the item against any person except the true owner or any previous possessors.

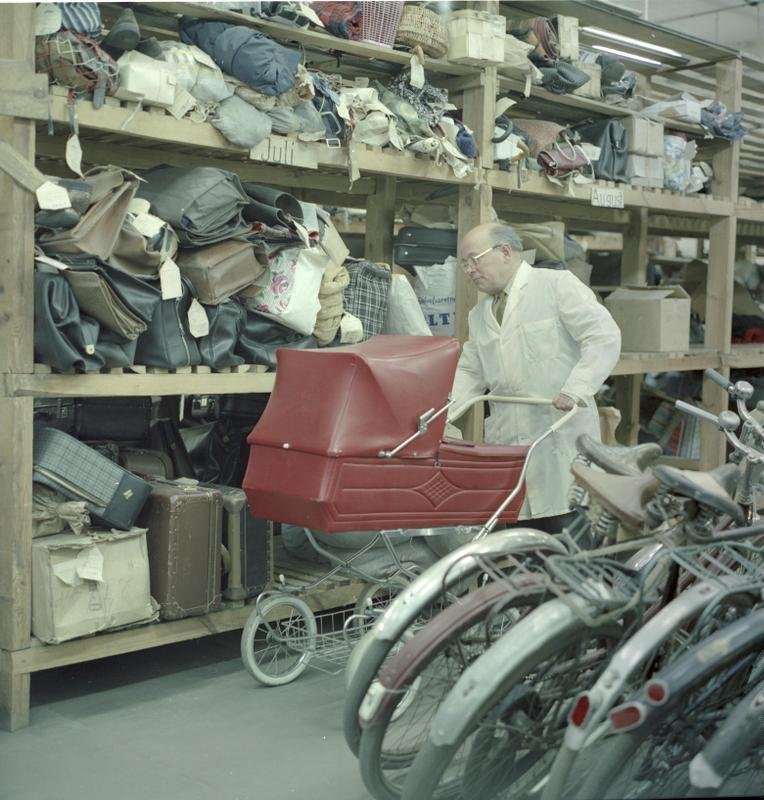
Objects stored in a lost and found office in Berlin, 1973

The underlying policy goals to these distinctions are to (hopefully) see that the property is returned to its true original owner, or "title owner". Most jurisdictions have now enacted statutes requiring that the finder of lost property turn it into the proper authorities; if the true owner does not arrive to claim the property within a certain period of time (for example, this is defined by the UK's Torts (Interference with Goods) Act 1977 as three months from the date of finding), the property is returned to the finder as their own or is disposed of. In Britain, many public businesses have a dedicated lost property office (LPO), which in the United States would be called a lost and found, where lost property can be reported and reclaimed free of charge.

The common law may apply many exceptions to the rule that the first finder of lost property has a superior claim of right over any other person except the previous owner. For example, a trespasser's claim to lost property which they find while trespassing is generally inferior to the claim of the respective landowner. As a corollary to this exception, a landowner has superior claim over a find made within the non-public areas of their property, so if a customer finds lost property in the public area of a store, the customer has superior claim to the lost property over that of the store-owner, but if the customer finds the lost property in the non-public area of that store (such as an area marked "Employees Only"), the store-owner will have superior claim, as the customer was trespassing when they found it.

The status of finders as employees or tenants of the landowner complicates matters because employees and tenants have legitimate access to non-public areas of a landowner's property that others would not, without trespassing. Employees and tenants, however, still usually lose superior claim over lost property to their employers or landlords if the property is found within the scope of their employment, or outside the actual leased area, respectively.

For example, if the lost property is found by a tenant inside the walls of their leasehold, or by an employee embedded within the soil of an estate owned by their employer, the landowner (as employer or landlord) of the property where it was found usually has a superior claim of right over that of the finder. However, this is not always the case, as a long-term tenant who finds lost property within the leased area of their leasehold may have a superior claim over that of their landlord (especially if the landlord has never been to the property). While employers usually have a superior claim over lost property found by their employees, exceptions to this exist as well, as modern law sometimes grants the employee superior claim if turning over lost property to their employer is not part of their job description (such as if the employee is an interior decorator).

=== Animals ===
Since animals are mobile and are thus capable of becoming lost on their own, the loss of property that is a valuable animal has its own set of rules. A valuable animal that becomes lost usually does so by leaving its owner's real property and arriving on another property owner's land; such an animal is legally termed an estray. Estrays are normally confined to domesticated animals, like livestock, and not wild animals. Since common pets are not considered valuable animals, dogs and cats are never considered estrays.

In many jurisdictions of the U.S., a person who discovers an estray will be required to file an affidavit of estray, along with its description, and potentially impound that animal in some way for a period of time. If the estray is branded, the owner can often be identified immediately. The owner of the estray will generally have a limited time frame in which to reclaim their property after a notice of estray is published, but on the expiration of such time another person or entity will be designated the new title owner of the property. Fees for impounding the estray will often accumulate which the property owner will be responsible for paying.

The status of a stray domestic animal (for example, a feral cat or a free-ranging dog) is highly dependent on local jurisdictions. Given the significant number of feral dogs and cats, the finder of a lost dog or cat may have little or no restrictions to claiming the animal as their own property.

=== Slaves ===
Like animals, fugitive slaves in the United States (runaway slaves) were a type of property that was capable of relocating to other places. Slave owners depended on others to identify and return their property; some slaves would be branded if a slave was known to run away. Numerous laws in the U.S., like the Fugitive Slave Clause of the Constitution of 1789, the Fugitive Slave Act of 1793, and the Fugitive Slave Act of 1850 all stipulated that the slaves be captured and returned to their owner. These laws, now superseded by Thirteenth Amendment to the Constitution of 1865, were demanded by the Southern States of the U.S. but were actively opposed in most Northern states. Activists against slavery and the fugitive slave laws, such as members of the Underground Railroad, routinely violated the laws and refused to return slaves to their owners.

Of the five laws agreed upon in the Compromise of 1850, the fugitive slave laws were by far the most contentious, although many of the issues were split along regional lines with Northerners and Southerners diametrically opposed. In Harriet Beecher Stowe's 1852 novel Uncle Tom's Cabin, the issue of runaway slaves was a central theme. These property and fugitive slave issues, along with other events related to slavery, would propel the U.S. into civil war.

=== Unclaimed property ===
Unclaimed property (sometimes referred to as abandoned property, residual assets, or remnant assets) consists of financial assets or, less commonly, tangible assets that have been left inactive or abandoned by their rightful owner for an extended period, known as the dormancy period. For individuals, this property often takes the form of forgotten bank accounts, uncashed payroll checks, unredeemed life insurance proceeds, uncollected dividends, or the contents of abandoned safe deposit boxes. For businesses, unclaimed property often involves dormant business-to-business transactions, such as uncollected accounts receivable, uncashed vendor checks, customer credit balances, overpayments, or forgotten utility and security deposits. When the rightful owner cannot be located by the financial institution or company holding the asset (the "holder"), the property becomes subject to government escheatment laws.

In the United States, the process of handling these assets is governed by state-specific laws that generally dictate annual reporting periods. Holders are required to report unclaimed property to the respective state's Unclaimed Property Office. The state acts as a custodian, holding the funds until the rightful owner makes a claim. The states sponsor public websites that report only a portion of the unclaimed property available in the United States. There are commercial sites as well that provide the same information or portions of the information for a fee.

In Australia, unclaimed money laws provide a one to two year reporting period each year whereby unclaimed bank accounts, superannuation, deceased estate inheritances, insurance, shares, dividends, utility deposits, unpresented cheques and other forms of "unclaimed money" are reported to the appropriate governing body under which the organization holding the money falls under. This can include states in Australia or the Commonwealth. Money is unclaimed money if it is money whose owners is not identifiable.

Owners of unclaimed money can apply to the governing body where the unclaimed money is being held, however, in some cases, the owner is required to go back to the organization who lodged the money as unclaimed. Unclaimed Money Professionals or Unclaimed Money Agents also can assist owners to claim back their unclaimed money. Due to the strict requirements to claim unclaimed money back in Australia, people may need the assistance of a professional or licensed private investigator to locate support documents for their claim of payment.

== Mislaid property ==
A wallet left on the counter in a bar would be considered mislaid rather than lost

Property is generally deemed to have been mislaid or misplaced if it is found in a place where the true owner likely did intend to set it, but then simply forgot to pick it up again. For example, a wallet found in a shop lying on a counter near a cash register will likely be deemed misplaced rather than lost.

Under common law principles, the finder of a misplaced object has a duty to turn it over to the owner of the premises, on the theory that the true owner is likely to return to that location to search for their misplaced item. If the true owner does not return within a reasonable time (which varies considerably depending on the circumstances), the property becomes that of the owner of the premises.

== Abandoned property ==
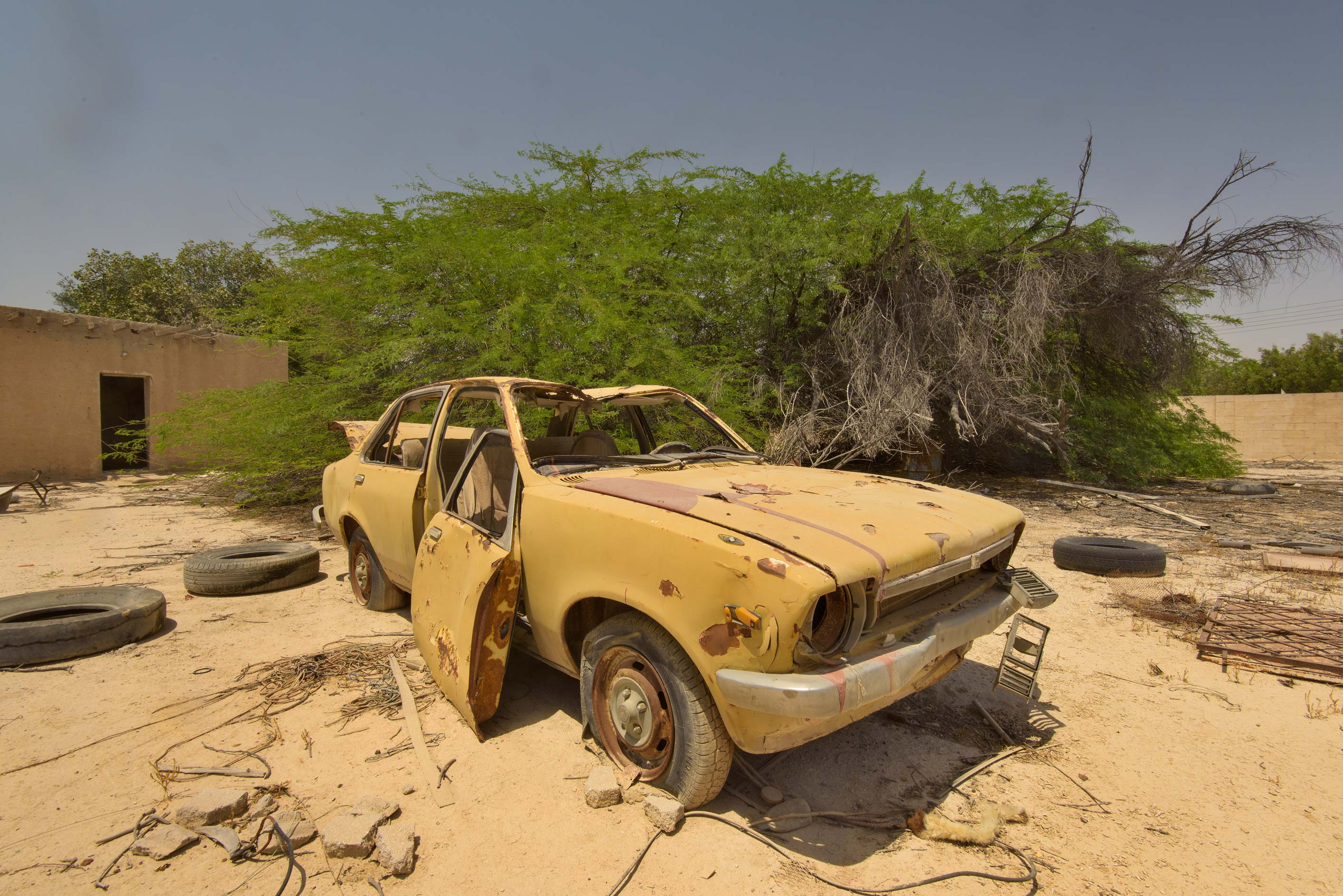
An abandoned car

Maui Police Department sticker, to be affixed to cars which are suspected of having been abandoned

Property is generally deemed to have been abandoned if it is found in a place where the current owner likely intended to leave it, but is in such a condition that it is apparent that he or she has no intention of returning to claim it. Abandoned property generally becomes the property of whoever should find it and take possession or title of it first, although some countries have enacted statutes under which certain kinds of abandoned property – usually cars, wrecked ships and wrecked aircraft – escheat, meaning that their ownership reverts or converts to the government.

In the United States, property left behind by a tenant is generally presumed abandoned after anywhere from 1 week to 1 year, and if unclaimed, may be disposed of or sold to recoup storage costs; in some states the difference may be kept by the landlord, in others returned to the tenant, and in others it must be turned over to the state or county. Virginia requires only 24 hour storage for evictions. Maryland allows individual counties to set required storage times. Colorado allows immediate disposal (but not sale), while Georgia and Texas allow it to be immediately placed outside and claimed by anyone, and Arkansas allows the landlord to immediately claim the property for themselves to do as they wish.

=== Treasure trove ===
Treasure trove is property that consists of coins or currency hidden by the owner. To be considered treasure trove and not mislaid property, the property must have been deliberately hidden or concealed, and sufficiently long ago that the original owner can be considered dead or not discoverable. For example, under historic English law, one hundred Roman coins found buried in a pot would have been treasure trove whilst one hundred Roman coins which were lost over time in a marketplace would not have been treasure trove, as they were not deliberately hidden as a single hoard. However, the law of treasure trove has now been replaced by the Treasure Act under which this distinction between lost and deposited items does not generally apply.

Under American common law, treasure trove belongs to the finder unless the original owner reclaims. Some states have rejected the American common law and hold that treasure trove belongs to the owner of the property in which the treasure trove was found. These courts reason that the American common law rule encourages trespass.

Under the traditional English common law, treasure trove belongs to the Crown, though the finder may be paid a reward.

== Legal issues ==
In the United States, the National Conference of Commissioners on Uniform State Laws sought to address the problems arising from these types of property through provisions of the Uniform Unclaimed Property Act. The act was first drafted and promulgated in 1981 and a revised version, the Revised Uniform Unclaimed Property Act was introduced in 1995. The act specifically focuses on the problem of unclaimed money in bank accounts and corporate coffers, and the corresponding escheatment.

In July 2016, the National Conference of Commissioners on Uniform State Laws revisited the 1995 version of the Uniform Act again and ultimately passed the Revised Uniform Unclaimed Property Act (RUUPA) of 2016. As of September 2020, only five states have enacted a version of a law inspired by the RUUPA: Tennessee, Kentucky, Utah, Colorado, and Vermont. Other states have adopted similar laws but with significant deviations from the RUUPA.

As a result of the Act, each state that has adopted the act operates an Unclaimed Property fund in which the proceeds from abandoned bank accounts, unpresented checks, etc. are to be turned over to the state after a specified period of time. Depending on state law, the money may be held either in perpetuity (i.e., the funds never escheat to the state; an example would be Texas), or after a long period of time (whereby it is presumed that the owner is deceased with no heirs) the funds will escheat to the state. Due to the increasing mobility of the population, 49 states have joined together to operate MissingMoney.com, a searchable database which lists unclaimed funds in these states. Another website at Unclaimed.org allows searches without charge for the remaining 11 states. Many commercial websites also offer this service at a charge. A searchable database for unclaimed money and property is available in Canada from the Bank of Canada.

A similar problem has developed with respect to orphan works, artistic or literary works for which a copyright is in effect, but for whom the copyright owner cannot be found.

== See also ==
- Adverse possession
- Bona vacantia – precedent of escheat
- Escheat – forfeit of property to the state
- Marine salvage
- Old field (ecology)
- Probate – settling an estate after death
- Squatting
- Trover
