= Project Merlin =

2011 agreement between British government and four banks

Project Merlin is an agreement between the British Government of David Cameron and four of the major high street banks in the United Kingdom. These banks are Barclays, Lloyds Banking Group, the Royal Bank of Scotland and HSBC. The agreement covers aspects of banking activity, notably lending, pay and bonuses with the intention of promoting lending to businesses, particularly small businesses, curbing the size of bankers' bonuses and promoting transparency with regard to executive pay. The agreement was finalised on 9 February 2011.

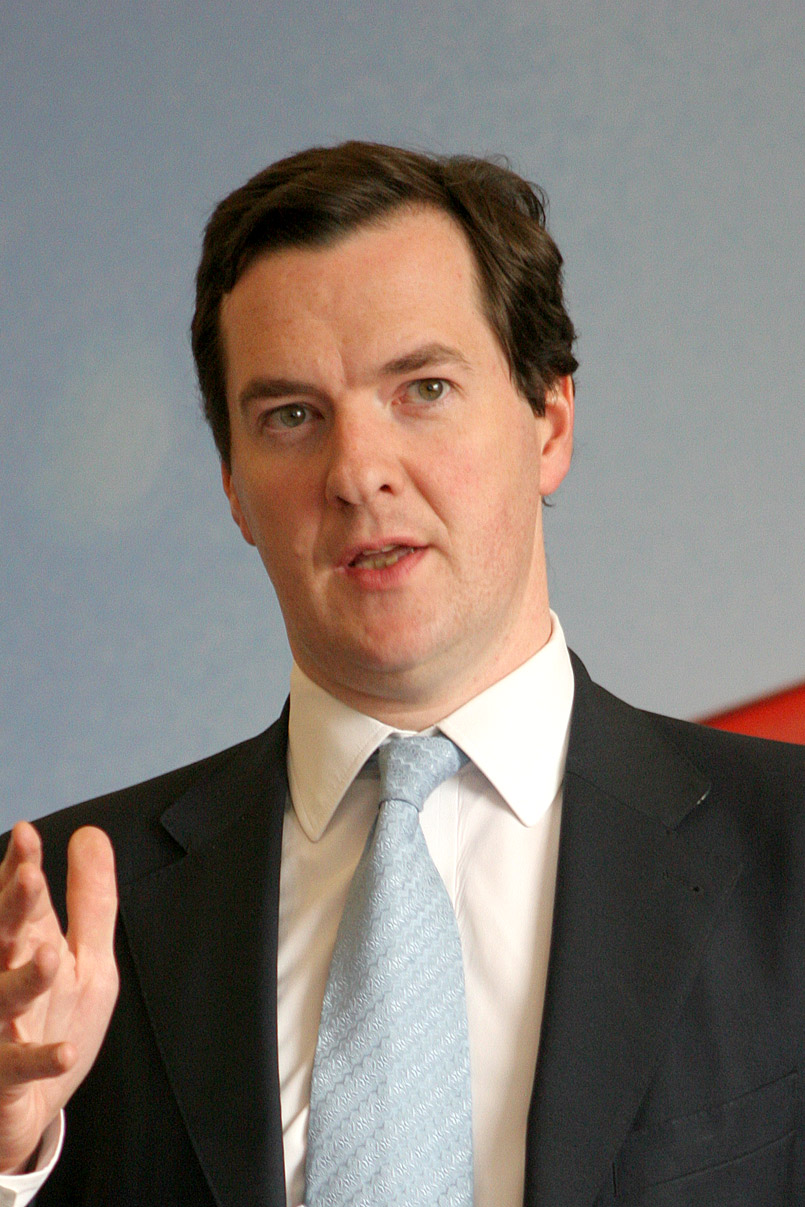
George Osborne, the Chancellor of the Exchequer who announced Project Merlin.

== Background ==
In October 2008, the Labour Government of the UK introduced a bank rescue package as a response to the 2008 financial crisis. The Northern Rock bank had already been nationalised following its collapse in 2007, the government subsequently part-nationalised Bradford & Bingley, Lloyds Banking Group and the Royal Bank of Scotland. The government had been concerned about low levels of bank lending during the recession that followed the banking crisis and had also been critical of high levels of pay and bonuses in the financial sector. In the 2009 Pre-Budget Report, the Labour Chancellor of the Exchequer, Alistair Darling announced a temporary tax on bankers' bonuses, which required banks to pay 50% of all bonuses above £25,000 as a tax. This tax was equivalent to a 33.3% income tax. This tax was temporary and lasted only for one year, but some, including Ed Miliband, the leader of the Labour Party called upon the coalition government to extend this tax as a response to predictions that UK banks would pay out high levels of bonuses in 2011.

== The Agreement ==
Project Merlin was announced on 9 February 2011 by Chancellor of the Exchequer George Osborne. Under the agreement banks will lend about £190bn to businesses during 2011 - including £76bn to small firms - curb bonuses and reveal some salary details of their top earners. The Bank of England will monitor whether loans targets are being met. This was in addition to the government increasing its levy on banks to £2.5bn in 2011 - raising an extra £800m. HSBC, Barclays, Royal Bank of Scotland (RBS) and Lloyds Banking Group have signed up to the Project Merlin agreement, while Santander has agreed to the lending parts of the deal. Other pledges include providing £200m of capital for David Cameron's Big Society Bank, which is intended to finance community projects.

== Reaction ==
Although there were some positive statements, initial overall reaction to the announcement of the deal was sceptical. One of those to welcome the deal was Angela Knight, chief executive of the British Bankers' Association, who said, "This is an unprecedented set of statements from Britain’s big four lending banks. There has been a determination to work together and that is shown by what we have seen here." But the Engineering Employers Federation, the trade body which represents manufacturers in the United Kingdom said, "Industry will feel today’s statement on Bank lending did not go nearly far enough. The new targets may lead to some increase in lending to SMEs, but the track record of previous agreements is not a good one. [...] Today's statement left untouched the key issues of lack of competition amongst the Banks, insufficient transparency in lending decisions and the lack of understanding of its customers. Until these issues are resolved, access to finance will remain the weak link in the government's strategy for growth."

Ed Balls, the Shadow Chancellor, criticised the deal as "toothless" and suggested that it contained a "clear get-out clause which allows the banks to do whatever they wish to enhance the interests of their shareholders.". Liberal Democrat peer Lord Oakeshott resigned as a Treasury spokesman in the House of Lords after making an outspoken attack on the agreement. He dismissed it as "pitiful", saying officials at the Treasury "couldn't negotiate their way out of a paper bag. [...] If this is robust action on bank bonuses then my name's Bob Diamond [the boss of Barclays Bank] and I’m going to claim my £9m bonus next week.". Danny Alexander, the Lib Dem Chief Secretary to the Treasury later said that Oakeshott had resigned "by mutual agreement".
