= MissingMoney.com =

American government website

- Website type: Government web portal
- Available in: English, Spanish, French
- Website: www.missingmoney.com
- Commercial: No
- Registration: No
- Launched: November 1, 1999; 26 years ago
- Current status: active

MissingMoney.com is a web portal created by participating U.S. states to allow individuals to search for unclaimed funds. It was established in November 1999, as a joint effort between the National Association of Unclaimed Property Administrators (NAUPA) and financial services provider CheckFree. By December of that year, 10 states had joined.

The website is now operated by Kelmar Associates, LLC on behalf of the NAUPA.

As of 2017, 39 states were participating in the program.

As of 2024, 49 states were participating in the program. The only state not using MissingMoney.com is Hawaii, but the website contains information on how to search for unclaimed property in each state. The province of Alberta in Canada and the US Territory of Puerto Rico are also participants.

Each unclaimed property department maintains their own website to search, but MissingMoney.com is the only website endorsed by NAUPA to help reunite owners with their missing funds.

As of 2022, when Kelmar Associates began operating the site, there are no advertisements found on MissingMoney.com, and there is no fee to search for property.
