= Chancellor of the Exchequer =

Lead minister of His Majesty's Treasury

Chancellor of the Exchequer Second Lord of the Treasury
- Royal Arms of His Majesty's Government

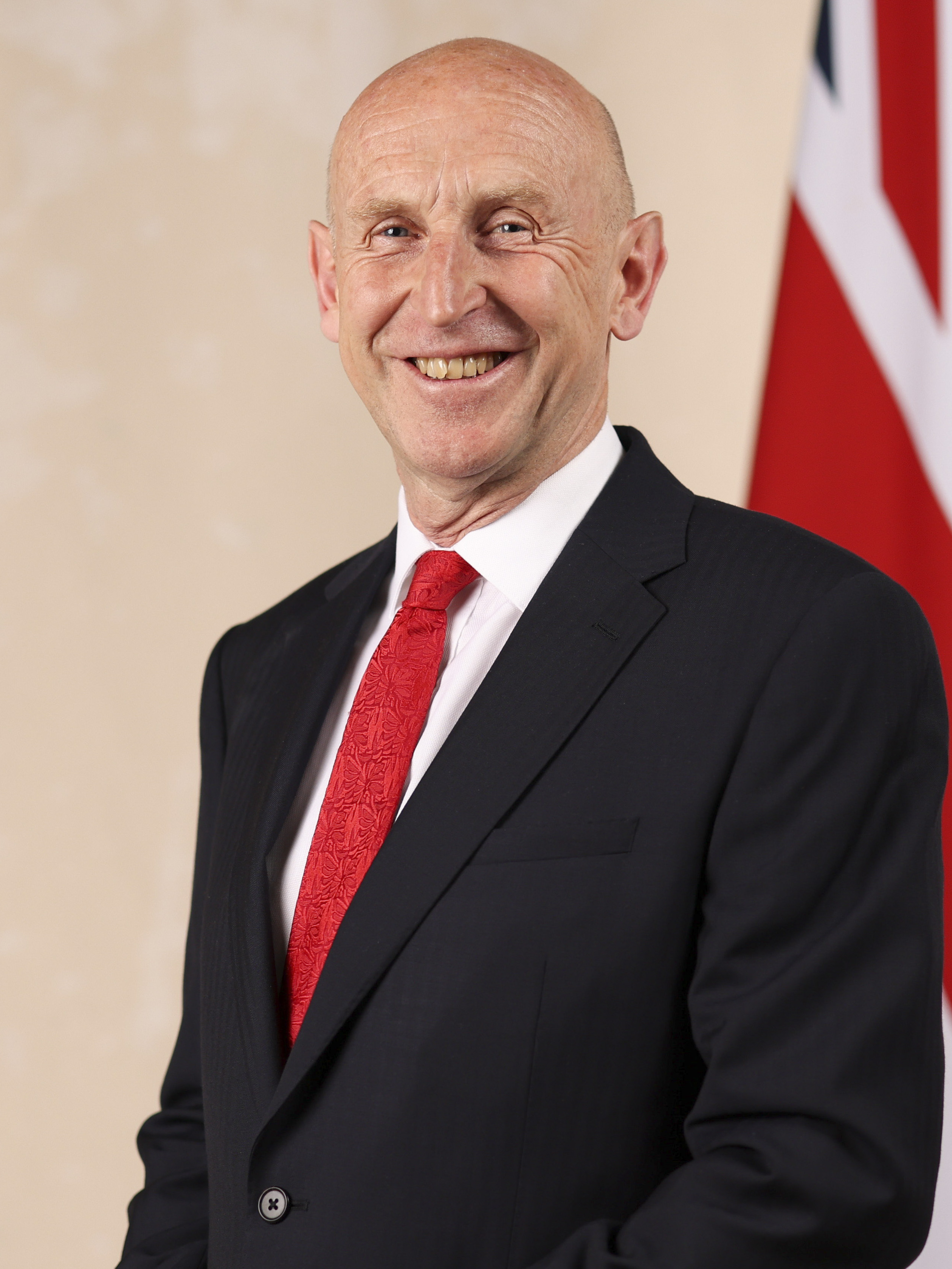
- Incumbent; John Healey since 20 July 2026
- His Majesty's Treasury
- Style: Chancellor (informal); The Right Honourable (within the UK and Commonwealth)
- Type: Minister of the Crown
- Status: Great Office of State
- Member of: Cabinet; Privy Council; National Security Council
- Reports to: First Lord of the Treasury (Prime Minister of the United Kingdom)
- Residence: 11 Downing Street
- Seat: Westminster
- Nominator: First Lord of the Treasury
- Appointer: The Monarch; (on the advice of the Prime Minister)
- Term length: At His Majesty's pleasure
- Formation: c. 1221
- First holder: Eustace of Fauconberg (in the Kingdom of England only)
- Deputy: Chief Secretary to the Treasury
- Salary: £163,891 per annum (2024) (including £91,346 MP salary)
- Website: www.gov.uk/government/ministers/chancellor-of-the-exchequer

The chancellor of the exchequer (formally chancellor and under treasurer of His Majesty’s exchequer), often abbreviated to chancellor, is a senior minister of the Crown within the Government of the United Kingdom, and the head of His Majesty's Treasury. As one of the four Great Offices of State, the chancellor is a high-ranking member of the British Cabinet.

Responsible for all economic and financial matters, the role is equivalent to that of a finance minister in other countries. The chancellor is now always the second lord of the treasury as one of at least six Lords Commissioners of the Treasury, responsible for executing the office of the Treasurer of the Exchequer – the others are the prime minister and Commons government whips. In the 18th and early 19th centuries, it was common for the prime minister also to serve as Chancellor of the Exchequer if he sat in the Commons; the last chancellor who was simultaneously prime minister and Chancellor of the Exchequer was Stanley Baldwin in 1923. Formerly, in cases when the chancellorship was vacant, the Lord Chief Justice of the King's Bench would act as chancellor pro tempore. The last lord chief justice to serve in this way was Lord Denman in 1834.

The chancellor is the third-oldest major state office in English and British history, and in recent times has come to be the most powerful office in British politics after the prime minister. It originally carried responsibility for the Exchequer, the medieval English institution for the collection and auditing of royal revenues. The earliest surviving records which are the results of the exchequer's audit date from 1129 to 1130 under King Henry I and show continuity from previous years. The chancellor has oversight of fiscal policy, therefore of taxation and public spending across government departments. It previously controlled monetary policy as well until 1997, when the Bank of England was granted independent control of its interest rates.

Since 1718, all chancellors of the exchequer, except at times the lord chief justice of England and Wales as interim holders, have been members of the House of Commons, with Lord Stanhope being the last chancellor from the House of Lords.

The office holder works alongside the other Treasury ministers and the permanent secretary to the Treasury. The corresponding shadow minister is the shadow chancellor of the exchequer, and the chancellor is also scrutinised by the Liberal Democrat Treasury spokesperson and the Treasury Select Committee.

== Second Lord of the Treasury ==
The holder of the office of chancellor of the exchequer is ex officio second lord of the Treasury as a member of the commission exercising the ancient office of Treasurer of the Exchequer. As second lord, their official residence is 11 Downing Street in London, next door to the residence of the first lord of the Treasury (a title that has for many years been held by the prime minister), who resides in 10 Downing Street. While in the past both houses were private residences, today they serve as interlinked offices, with the occupant living in an apartment made from attic rooms previously resided in by servants.

Since 1827, the chancellor has always simultaneously held the office of second lord of the Treasury when that person has not also been the prime minister.

== Roles and responsibilities ==
A previous chancellor, Robert Lowe, described the office in the following terms in the House of Commons, on 11 April 1870: "The Chancellor of the Exchequer is a man whose duties make him more or less of a taxing machine. He is entrusted with a certain amount of misery which it is his duty to distribute as fairly as he can."

=== Fiscal policy ===
The chancellor has considerable control over other departments as it is the Treasury that sets Departmental Expenditure Limits. The amount of power this gives to an individual chancellor depends on their personal forcefulness, their status within their party and their relationship with the prime minister. Gordon Brown, who became chancellor when Labour came into Government in 1997, had a large personal power base in the party. Perhaps as a result, Tony Blair chose to keep him in the same position throughout his ten years as prime minister; making Brown an unusually dominant figure and the longest-serving chancellor since the Reform Act 1832. This has strengthened a pre-existing trend towards the chancellor occupying a clear second position among government ministers, elevated above their traditional peers, the foreign secretary and home secretary.

One part of the chancellor's key roles involves the framing of the annual year budget. As of 2017, the first is the Autumn Budget, also known as Budget Day which forecasts government spending in the next financial year and also announces new financial measures. The second is a Spring Statement, also known as a "mini-Budget". Britain's tax year has retained the old Julian end of year: 24 March (Old Style) / 5 April (New Style, i.e. Gregorian). From 1993, the Budget was in spring, preceded by an annual autumn statement. This was then called Pre-Budget Report. The Autumn Statement usually took place in November or December. The 1997, 2001, 2002, 2003, 2006, 2007, 2008, 2012 and 2016 budgets were all delivered on a Wednesday, summarised in a speech to the House of Commons.

The budget is a state secret until the chancellor reveals it in the speech given to Parliament. Hugh Dalton, on his way to giving the budget speech in 1947, inadvertently blurted out key details to a newspaper reporter, and they appeared in print before he made his speech. Dalton was forced to resign.

=== Monetary policy ===
Although the Bank of England is responsible for setting interest rates, the chancellor also plays an important part in the monetary policy structure. They set the inflation target which the Bank must set interest rates to meet. Under the Bank of England Act 1998 the chancellor has the power of appointment of four out of nine members of the Bank's Monetary Policy Committee – the so-called 'external' members. They also have a high level of influence over the appointment of the Bank's Governor and Deputy Governors, and has the right of consultation over the appointment of the two remaining MPC members from within the Bank. The Act also provides that the Government has the power to give instructions to the Bank on interest rates for a limited period in extreme circumstances. This power has never been officially used.

=== Ministerial arrangements ===
At HM Treasury the chancellor is supported by a political team of four junior ministers and by permanent civil servants. The most important junior minister is the chief secretary to the Treasury, a member of the Cabinet, to whom the negotiations with other government departments on the details of government spending are delegated, followed by the paymaster general, the financial secretary to the Treasury and the economic secretary to the Treasury. Whilst not continuously in use, there can also be appointed a commercial secretary to the Treasury and an exchequer secretary to the Treasury. Two other officials are given the title of a secretary to the Treasury, although neither is a government minister in the Treasury: the parliamentary secretary to the Treasury is the Government chief whip in the House of Commons; the permanent secretary to the Treasury is not a minister but the senior civil servant in the Treasury.

The chancellor is obliged to be a member of the Privy Council, and thus is styled the Right Honourable (Rt. Hon.). Because the House of Lords is excluded from financial matters by tradition confirmed by the Parliament Acts 1911 and 1949, the office is effectively limited to members of the House of Commons; apart from the occasions when the lord chief justice of the King's Bench has acted as interim chancellor. The last peer to hold the office was Henry Booth, 2nd Baron Delamer (created Earl of Warrington shortly after leaving office) from 9 April 1689 to 18 March 1690. The chancellor holds the formerly independent office of Master of the Mint as a subsidiary office.

== Perquisites of the office ==
=== Official residence ===
The chancellor has no official London residence as such but since 1828 in their role as Second Lord of the Treasury they live in the second lord's official residence, No. 11 Downing Street. In 1997, the then first and second Lords, Tony Blair and Gordon Brown respectively, swapped apartments, as the chancellor's larger apartment in No. 11 better accommodated Blair's substantial family (besides himself and his wife, he had three children under 18 upon taking office, and a fourth was born in 2000); meanwhile, Brown was then unmarried and had no children.

=== Dorneywood ===
Dorneywood is the summer residence that is traditionally made available to the chancellor, though it is the prime minister who ultimately decides who may use it. Gordon Brown, on becoming chancellor in 1997, refused to use it and the house, which is set in 215 acres (87 ha) of parkland, was allocated to Deputy Prime Minister John Prescott. In 2007, it reverted to the then-chancellor, Alistair Darling.

=== Budget box ===
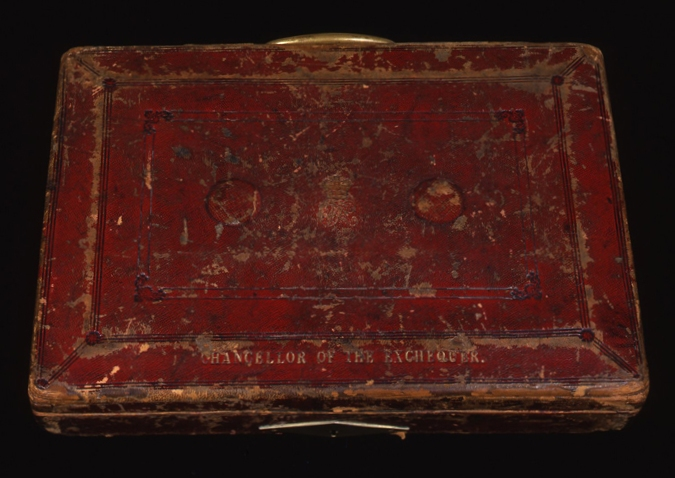
Budget box or Gladstone box, c. 1860

The chancellor traditionally carries their budget speech to the House of Commons in a particular red despatch box. The so-called 'Budget Box' is identical to the cases used by all other government ministers (known as ministerial boxes or "despatch boxes") to transport their official papers, but is better known because the chancellor traditionally displays the box, containing the budget speech, to the press before leaving 11 Downing Street for the House of Commons.

The original budget box was first used by William Ewart Gladstone in 1853 and continued in use until 1965 when James Callaghan was the first chancellor to break with tradition when he used a newer box. Prior to Gladstone, a generic red despatch box of varying design and specification was used. The practice is said to have begun in the late 16th century, when Queen Elizabeth I's representative Francis Throckmorton presented the Spanish Ambassador, Bernardino de Mendoza, with a specially constructed red briefcase filled with black puddings.

In July 1997, Gordon Brown became the second chancellor to use a new box for the Budget. Made by industrial trainees at Babcock Rosyth Defence Ltd ship and submarine dockyard in Fife, the new box is made of yellow pine, with a brass handle and lock, covered in scarlet leather and embossed with the Royal cypher and crest and the chancellor's title. In his first Budget, in March 2008, Alistair Darling reverted to using the original budget box and his successor, George Osborne, continued this tradition for his first budget, before announcing that it would be retired due to its fragile condition. The key to the original budget box has been lost.

=== Budget tipple ===
By tradition, the chancellor has been allowed to drink whatever they wish while making the annual budget speech to Parliament. This includes alcohol, which is otherwise banned under parliamentary rules.

Previous chancellors have opted for whisky (Kenneth Clarke), gin and tonic (Geoffrey Howe), brandy and water (Benjamin Disraeli and John Major), spritzer (Nigel Lawson) and sherry and beaten egg (William Gladstone).

The chancellors after Clarke — Gordon Brown, Alistair Darling, George Osborne and Philip Hammond — opted for water. In fact Darling drank what was named "Standard Water" in reference to, and support of, the London Evening Standard newspaper's campaign to have plain tap water available in restaurants at no charge to customers.

=== Robe of office ===
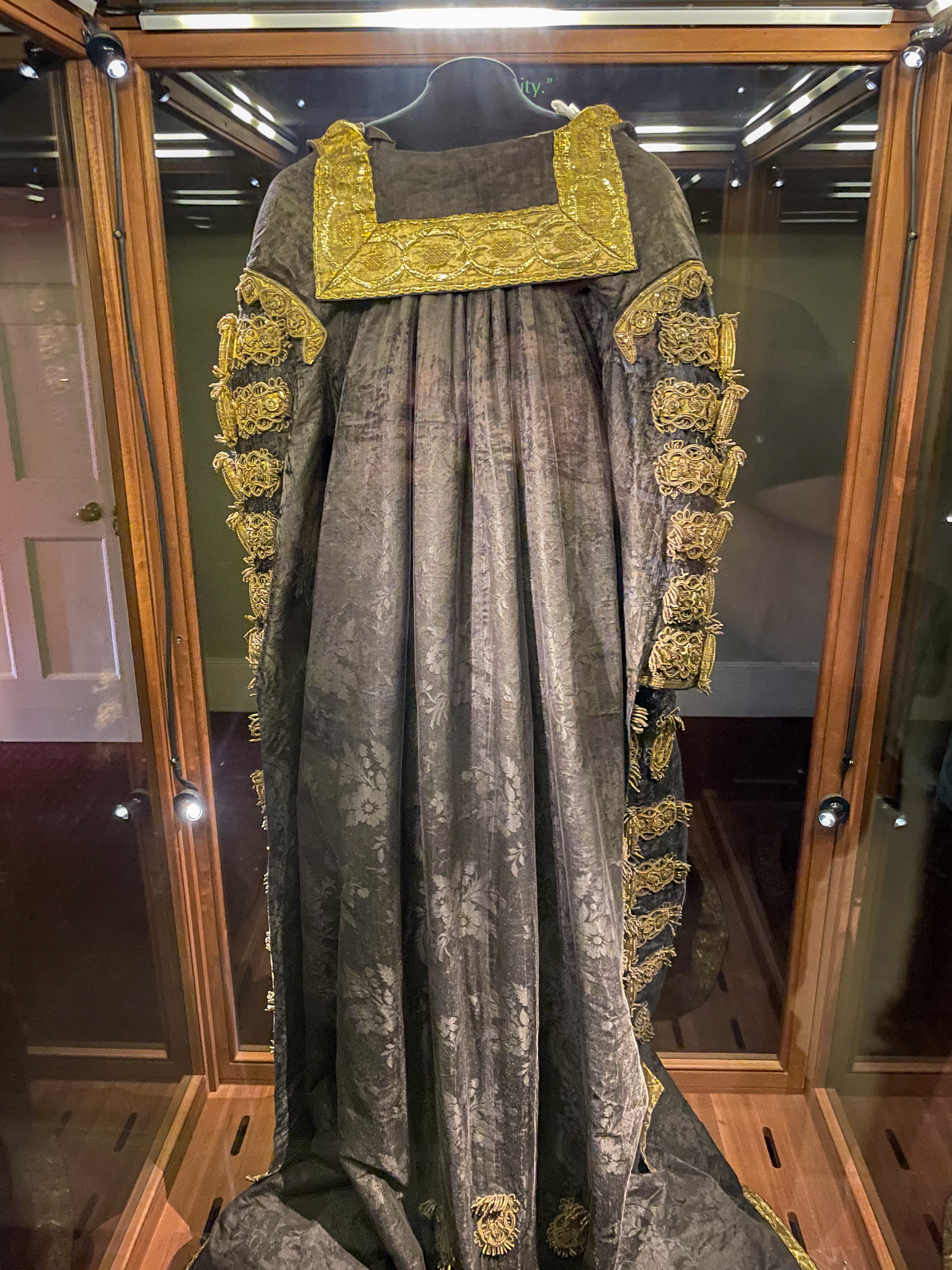
Chancellor of the Exchequer's robe now at Hughenden Manor. (Reputedly made for Pitt the Younger, it was handed down to each of his successors but kept by Disraeli, forcing Gladstone to purchase a replacement).

The chancellor has a robe of office, similar to that of the lord chancellor (as seen in several of the portraits depicted below), which was always worn by the chancellor when sitting in the Court of Exchequer (prior to the abolition of that Court in 1873). In recent times the robe was regularly worn at coronations; other than that it continued to be worn twice-yearly by the Chancellor: it was always worn by the Chancellor when presiding at the Nomination of Sheriffs (though the Chancellor has not attended 'in recent times'), and up until 1997 it was worn annually by the chancellor when attending the verdict of the Trial of the Pyx. According to George Osborne, the robe (dating from Gladstone's time in office, and worn by the likes of Lloyd George and Churchill) 'went missing' during Gordon Brown's time as chancellor.

== List of chancellors of the exchequer ==
=== England (c. 1221 – c. 1558) ===
Chancellor of the Exchequer	Term of office		Monarch (Reign)
Eustace of Fauconberg; Bishop of London	c. 1221	—N/a	Henry III (1216–1272)
John Mansel; Secretary of State	c. 1234	—N/a	Henry III (1216–1272)
Ralph de Leicester	before 1248		Henry III (1216–1272)
Edward of Westminster	1248	—N/a	Henry III (1216–1272)
Albric de Fiscamp	before 1263		Henry III (1216–1272)
John Chishull; Lord Chancellor (Note: Served until 1264.)	1263	1265	Henry III (1216–1272)
Walter Giffard; Bishop of Bath and Wells	1265	1266	Henry III (1216–1272)
Godfrey Giffard; Lord Chancellor	1266	1268	Henry III (1216–1272)
John Chishull; Lord Chancellor	1268	1269	Henry III (1216–1272)
Richard of Middleton; Archdeacon of Northumberland	1269	1272^{†}	Henry III (1216–1272)
Roger de la Leye	before 1283		Henry III (1216–1272)
Geoffrey de Neuband	before 1283		Edward I (1272–1307)
Philip de Willoughby	1283	1305	Edward I (1272–1307)
John Benstead; Secretary of State	1305	1306	Edward I (1272–1307)
John Sandale; Bishop of Winchester	c. July; 1307	1308	Edward II (1307–1327)
John of Markenfield	1309	1312	Edward II (1307–1327)
John Hotham; Bishop of Ely	1312	1316	Edward II (1307–1327)
Hervey de Stanton	1316	c. 1323	Edward II (1307–1327)
Walter Stapledon; Lord High Treasurer	1323	c. 1324	Edward II (1307–1327)
Hervey de Stanton; Chief Justice of the Common Pleas	1324	c. January; 1327	Edward II (1307–1327)
Adam de Harvington	c. January; 1327	1330	Edward III (1327–1377) (Note: Lord Lancaster served as Regent of England during the minority of Edward III.)
Robert Wodehouse	1330	1331	Edward III (1327–1377)
Robert de Stratford; Bishop of Chichester	1331	1334	Edward III (1327–1377)
John Hildesle	c. 1338	—N/a	Edward III (1327–1377)
William de Everdon	1341	—N/a	Edward III (1327–1377)
William Askeby; Archdeacon of Northampton	1363	—N/a	Edward III (1327–1377)
Robert de Ashton	1375	c. June; 1377	Edward III (1327–1377)
Sir Walter Barnham	c. June; 1377	c. September; 1399	Richard II (1377–1399)
Henry Somer; MP for Middlesex	1410	1437	Henry IV (1399–1413)
Henry Somer; MP for Middlesex	1410	1437	Henry V (1413–1422)
Henry Somer; MP for Middlesex	1410	1437	Henry VI (1422–1461) (Note: The Regency government led by the Regency Council governed England during the minority of Henry VI.)
John Somerset	1441	1447	Henry VI (1422–1461)
Thomas Browne; MP for Dover	1440?	1450?	Henry VI (1422–1461)
Thomas Witham	1454	—N/a	Henry VI (1422–1461)
Thomas Thwaites	c. March; 1461	—N/a	Edward IV (1461–1470)
Thomas Witham	1465	1469	Edward IV (1461–1470)
Richard Fowler	1469	c. April; 1471	Edward IV (1461–1470)
Richard Fowler	1469	c. April; 1471	Henry VI (1470–1471)
Thomas Thwaites; Chancellor of the Duchy of Lancaster	c. April; 1471	c. April; 1483	Edward IV (1471–1483)
William Catesby; Speaker of the House of Commons	c. April; 1483	c. 1484	Edward V (1483) (Note: The Duke of Gloucester served as Regent of England during the reign of Edward V.)
William Catesby; Speaker of the House of Commons	c. April; 1483	c. 1484	Richard III (1483–1485)
Thomas Lovell; Speaker of the House of Commons (Note: Served until 1488.)	c. August; 1485	1524	Henry VII (1485–1509)
Thomas Lovell; Speaker of the House of Commons	c. August; 1485	1524	Henry VIII (1509–1547) (Note: Margaret Beaufort served as Regent of England during the minority of Henry VIII.)
John Bourchier; 2nd Baron Berners	1524	1533?	Henry VIII (1509–1547)
Thomas Cromwell; 1st Earl of Essex; Secretary of State	12 April 1533	10 June 1540	Henry VIII (1509–1547)
John Baker; MP for Kent	1545	c. November; 1558	Henry VIII (1509–1547)
John Baker; MP for Kent	1545	c. November; 1558	Edward VI (1547–1553) (Note: The Duke of Somerset and Duke of Northumberland served as Regent of England successively during the reign of Edward VI.)
John Baker; MP for Kent	1545	c. November; 1558	Mary I (1553–1558)

^† Died in office.

=== England (c. 1558 – 1708) ===
Chancellor of the Exchequer (Note: Including constituencies for elected MPs.)	Term of office		Monarch (Reign)	
Richard Sackville; MP for Sussex	February; 1559	21 April 1566^{†}	Elizabeth I (1558–1603)	
Walter Mildmay; MP for Northamptonshire	1566	31 May 1589^{†}	Elizabeth I (1558–1603)	
John Fortescue MP for Buckinghamshire (Note: Served until 1589 during the 9th Parliament of Queen Elizabeth I.) →Middlesex (Note: Served from 1601 prior to the Golden Speech.)	1589	1603	Elizabeth I (1558–1603)	
George Home; 1st Earl of Dunbar	24 May 1603	April; 1606	James I (1603–1625)	
Julius Caesar; MP for Middlesex	11 April 1606	1614	James I (1603–1625)	
Fulke Greville; MP for Warwickshire (Note: Served during the 3rd Parliament of King James I in 1621.)	15 October 1614	1621	James I (1603–1625)	
Richard Weston; MP for 7 constituencies successively	29 January 1621	15 July 1628	James I (1603–1625)	
Richard Weston; MP for 7 constituencies successively	29 January 1621	15 July 1628	Charles I (1625–1649)	
Edward Barrett; 1st Lord Barrett of Newburgh	14 August 1628	1629	Charles I (1625–1649)	
Francis Cottington; 1st Baron Cottington	18 April 1629	6 January 1642	Charles I (1625–1649)	
John Colepeper; MP for Kent	6 January 1642	22 February 1643	Charles I (1625–1649)	
Edward Hyde	February; 1643	1646	Charles I (1625–1649)	
Vacancy during the Interregnum (1649–1660)
Chancellor of the Exchequer	Term of office		Ministry	Monarch (Reign)
Edward Hyde; 1st Baron Hyde	1660	13 May 1661	Clarendon	Charles II (1660–1685)
Anthony Ashley Cooper; 1st Baron Ashley	13 May 1661	22 November 1672	Clarendon	Charles II (1660–1685)
Anthony Ashley Cooper; 1st Baron Ashley	13 May 1661	22 November 1672	Cabal	Charles II (1660–1685)
John Duncombe; MP for Bury St Edmunds	22 November 1672	2 May 1676	Cabal	Charles II (1660–1685)
John Duncombe; MP for Bury St Edmunds	22 November 1672	2 May 1676	Danby I	Charles II (1660–1685)
John Ernle; MP for 4 constituencies successively	2 May 1676	9 April 1689	Danby I	Charles II (1660–1685)
John Ernle; MP for 4 constituencies successively	2 May 1676	9 April 1689	Privy Council	Charles II (1660–1685)
John Ernle; MP for 4 constituencies successively	2 May 1676	9 April 1689	Chits	Charles II (1660–1685)
John Ernle; MP for 4 constituencies successively	2 May 1676	9 April 1689	Chits	James II (1685–1688)
John Ernle; MP for 4 constituencies successively	2 May 1676	9 April 1689	Chits	William III & Mary II (1689–1694)
Henry Booth; 2nd Baron Delamer	9 April 1689	18 March 1690	Carmarthen–Halifax	William III & Mary II (1689–1694)
Richard Hampden; MP for Buckinghamshire	18 March 1690	10 May 1694	Carmarthen	William III & Mary II (1689–1694)
Charles Montagu MP for Maldon → Westminster (Note: Elected to a new constituency in the 1695 general election.)	10 May 1694	31 May 1699	Whig Junto I	William III & Mary II (1689–1694)
Charles Montagu MP for Maldon → Westminster	10 May 1694	31 May 1699	Whig Junto I	William III (1694–1702)
John Smith; MP for Andover	31 May 1699	23 March 1701	Junto Tory	William III (1694–1702)
Henry Boyle MP for Cambridge University → Westminster (Note: Elected to a new constituency in the 1705 general election.)	27 March 1701	22 April 1708	Junto Tory	William III (1694–1702)
Henry Boyle MP for Cambridge University → Westminster	27 March 1701	22 April 1708	Godolphin–Marlborough (Tory–Whig)	Anne (1702–1714)

=== Great Britain (1708–1817) ===
Chancellor of the Exchequer	Term of office		Party	Ministry	Monarch (Reign)
John Smith; MP for Andover	22 April 1708	11 August 1710	Whig	Godolphin–Marlborough (Tory–Whig)	Anne (1702–1714)
Robert Harley; MP for Radnor	11 August 1710	4 June 1711	Tory	Oxford–Bolingbroke	Anne (1702–1714)
Robert Benson; MP for York	4 June 1711	21 August 1713	Tory	Oxford–Bolingbroke	Anne (1702–1714)
William Wyndham; MP for Somerset	21 August 1713	13 October 1714	Tory	Oxford–Bolingbroke	Anne (1702–1714)
William Wyndham; MP for Somerset	21 August 1713	13 October 1714	Tory	Oxford–Bolingbroke	George I (1714–1727) (Note: Lord Parker served as Regent of Great Britain from 1 August to 18 September 1714.)
Richard Onslow; MP for Surrey	13 October 1714	12 October 1715	Whig	Townshend	George I (1714–1727)
Robert Walpole; MP for King's Lynn	12 October 1715	15 April 1717	Whig	Townshend	George I (1714–1727)
James Stanhope; 1st Earl Stanhope	15 April 1717	20 March 1718	Whig	Stanhope–Sunderland I	George I (1714–1727)
John Aislabie; MP for Ripon	20 March 1718	23 January 1721	Whig	Stanhope–Sunderland II	George I (1714–1727)
John Pratt; Lord Chief Justice (interim)	2 February 1721	3 April 1721	Whig	Stanhope–Sunderland II	George I (1714–1727)
Robert Walpole; 1st Earl of Orford; MP for King's Lynn (Note: Elevated to the Peerage of Great Britain on 6 February 1742.)	3 April 1721	12 February 1742	Whig	Walpole–Townshend	George I (1714–1727)
Robert Walpole; 1st Earl of Orford; MP for King's Lynn	3 April 1721	12 February 1742	Whig	Walpole–Townshend	George II (1727–1760)
Robert Walpole; 1st Earl of Orford; MP for King's Lynn	3 April 1721	12 February 1742	Whig	Walpole	George II (1727–1760)
Samuel Sandys; MP for Worcester	12 February 1742	12 December 1743	Whig	Carteret	George II (1727–1760)
Henry Pelham; MP for Sussex	12 December 1743	8 March 1754^{†}	Whig	Carteret	George II (1727–1760)
Henry Pelham; MP for Sussex	12 December 1743	8 March 1754^{†}	Whig	Broad Bottom (I & II)	George II (1727–1760)
William Lee; Lord Chief Justice (interim)	8 March 1754	6 April 1754	Whig	Newcastle I	George II (1727–1760)
Henry Bilson-Legge; MP for Orford	6 April 1754	25 November 1755	Whig	Newcastle I	George II (1727–1760)
George Lyttelton; MP for Okehampton	25 November 1755	16 November 1756	Whig	Newcastle I	George II (1727–1760)
Henry Bilson-Legge; MP for Orford	16 November 1756	13 April 1757	Whig	Pitt–Devonshire	George II (1727–1760)
William Murray; 1st Earl of Mansfield; Lord Chief Justice (interim)	13 April 1757	2 July 1757	Whig	Pitt–Devonshire	George II (1727–1760)
William Murray; 1st Earl of Mansfield; Lord Chief Justice (interim)	13 April 1757	2 July 1757	Whig	1757 Caretaker	George II (1727–1760)
Henry Bilson-Legge MP for Orford → Hampshire (Note: Elected to a new constituency in the Hampshire by-election.)	2 July 1757	19 March 1761	Whig	Pitt–Newcastle	George II (1727–1760)
Henry Bilson-Legge MP for Orford → Hampshire	2 July 1757	19 March 1761	Whig	Pitt–Newcastle	George III (1760–1820) (Note: The Prince of Wales served as prince regent from 5 February 1811.)
William Barrington; 2nd Viscount Barrington; MP for Plymouth	19 March 1761	29 May 1762	Whig	Pitt–Newcastle	George III (1760–1820)
Francis Dashwood; MP for Weymouth and Melcombe Regis	29 May 1762	16 April 1763	Tory	Bute (Tory–Whig)	George III (1760–1820)
George Grenville; MP for Buckingham	16 April 1763	16 July 1765	Whig	Grenville (Whig–Tory)	George III (1760–1820)
William Dowdeswell; MP for Worcestershire	16 July 1765	2 August 1766	Whig	Rockingham I	George III (1760–1820)
Charles Townshend; MP for Harwich	2 August 1766	4 September 1767^{†}	Whig	Chatham (Whig–Tory)	George III (1760–1820)
Frederick North; Lord North; MP for Banbury	11 September 1767	27 March 1782	Tory	Chatham (Whig–Tory)	George III (1760–1820)
Frederick North; Lord North; MP for Banbury	11 September 1767	27 March 1782	Tory	Grafton	George III (1760–1820)
Frederick North; Lord North; MP for Banbury	11 September 1767	27 March 1782	Tory	North	George III (1760–1820)
Lord John Cavendish; MP for York	27 March 1782	10 July 1782	Whig	Rockingham II	George III (1760–1820)
William Pitt the Younger; MP for Appleby	10 July 1782	31 March 1783	Whig	Shelburne (Whig–Tory)	George III (1760–1820)
Lord John Cavendish; MP for York	2 April 1783	19 December 1783	Whig	Fox–North	George III (1760–1820)
William Pitt the Younger MP for Appleby → Cambridge University (Note: Elected to a new constituency in the 1784 general election.)	19 December 1783	14 March 1801	Tory	Pitt I	George III (1760–1820)
Henry Addington; MP for Devizes	14 March 1801	10 May 1804	Tory	Addington	George III (1760–1820)
William Pitt the Younger; MP for Cambridge University	10 May 1804	23 January 1806^{†}	Tory	Pitt II	George III (1760–1820)
Edward Law; 1st Baron Ellenborough; Lord Chief Justice (interim)	23 January 1806	5 February 1806	Tory	All the Talents (Whig–Tory)	George III (1760–1820)
Lord Henry Petty-Fitzmaurice; MP for Cambridge University	5 February 1806	26 March 1807	Whig	All the Talents (Whig–Tory)	George III (1760–1820)
Spencer Perceval; MP for Northampton	26 March 1807	11 May 1812^{†}	Tory	Portland II	George III (1760–1820)
Spencer Perceval; MP for Northampton	26 March 1807	11 May 1812^{†}	Tory	Perceval	George III (1760–1820)
Nicholas Vansittart MP for East Grinstead → Harwich (Note: Elected to a new constituency in the 1812 general election.)	9 June 1812	12 July 1817	Tory	Liverpool	George III (1760–1820)

=== United Kingdom (1817–present) ===
Although the Kingdoms of Great Britain and Ireland had been united by the Acts of Union 1800, the Exchequers of the two Kingdoms were not consolidated until 1817 under the Consolidated Fund Act 1816 (56 Geo. 3. c. 98). For the holders of the Irish office before this date, see Chancellor of the Exchequer of Ireland.

Chancellor of the Exchequer		Term of office		Party	Ministry	Monarch (Reign)
	Nicholas Vansittart; MP for Harwich	12 July 1817	31 January 1823	Tory	Liverpool	George III (1760–1820) (Note: The Prince of Wales served as prince regent from 5 February 1811.)
	Nicholas Vansittart; MP for Harwich	12 July 1817	31 January 1823	Tory	Liverpool	George IV (1820–1830)
	Frederick John Robinson; MP for Ripon	31 January 1823	27 April 1827	Tory	Liverpool	George IV (1820–1830)
	George Canning; MP for Seaford	27 April 1827	8 August 1827^{†}	Tory	Canning (Canningite–Whig)	George IV (1820–1830)
	Charles Abbott; 1st Baron Tenterden; Lord Chief Justice (interim)	8 August 1827	5 September 1827	Tory	Goderich	George IV (1820–1830)
	John Charles Herries; MP for Harwich	5 September 1827	26 January 1828	Tory	Goderich	George IV (1820–1830)
	Henry Goulburn; MP for Armagh	26 January 1828	22 November 1830	Tory	Wellington–Peel	George IV (1820–1830)
	Henry Goulburn; MP for Armagh	26 January 1828	22 November 1830	Tory	Wellington–Peel	William IV (1830–1837)
	John Spencer; Viscount Althorp MP for Northamptonshire → South Northamptonshire (Note: Elected to a new constituency in the 1832 general election.)	22 November 1830	14 November 1834	Whig	Grey	William IV (1830–1837)
	John Spencer; Viscount Althorp MP for Northamptonshire → South Northamptonshire	22 November 1830	14 November 1834	Whig	Melbourne I	William IV (1830–1837)
	Thomas Denman; 1st Baron Denman; Lord Chief Justice (interim)	14 November 1834	15 December 1834	Whig	Wellington Caretaker	William IV (1830–1837)
	Robert Peel; MP for Tamworth	15 December 1834	8 April 1835	Conservative	Peel I	William IV (1830–1837)
	Thomas Spring Rice; MP for Cambridge	18 April 1835	26 August 1839	Whig	Melbourne II	William IV (1830–1837)
	Thomas Spring Rice; MP for Cambridge	18 April 1835	26 August 1839	Whig	Melbourne II	Victoria (1837–1901)
	Francis Baring; MP for Portsmouth	26 August 1839	30 August 1841	Whig	Melbourne II	Victoria (1837–1901)
	Henry Goulburn; MP for Cambridge University	3 September 1841	27 June 1846	Conservative	Peel II	Victoria (1837–1901)
	Charles Wood; MP for Halifax	6 July 1846	21 February 1852	Whig	Russell I	Victoria (1837–1901)
	Benjamin Disraeli; MP for Buckinghamshire	27 February 1852	17 December 1852	Conservative	Who? Who?	Victoria (1837–1901)
	William Ewart Gladstone; MP for Oxford University	28 December 1852	28 February 1855	Peelite	Aberdeen (Peelite–Whig)	Victoria (1837–1901)
	George Cornewall Lewis; MP for Radnor	28 February 1855	21 February 1858	Whig	Palmerston I	Victoria (1837–1901)
	Benjamin Disraeli; MP for Buckinghamshire	26 February 1858	11 June 1859	Conservative	Derby–Disraeli II	Victoria (1837–1901)
	William Ewart Gladstone MP for Oxford University → South Lancashire (Note: Elected to a new constituency in the 1865 general election.)	18 June 1859	26 June 1866	Liberal	Palmerston II	Victoria (1837–1901)
	William Ewart Gladstone MP for Oxford University → South Lancashire	18 June 1859	26 June 1866	Liberal	Russell II	Victoria (1837–1901)
	Benjamin Disraeli; MP for Buckinghamshire	6 July 1866	29 February 1868	Conservative	Derby–Disraeli III	Victoria (1837–1901)
	George Ward Hunt; MP for North Northamptonshire	29 February 1868	1 December 1868	Conservative	Derby–Disraeli III	Victoria (1837–1901)
	Robert Lowe; MP for London University	9 December 1868	11 August 1873	Liberal	Gladstone I	Victoria (1837–1901)
	William Ewart Gladstone; MP for Greenwich	11 August 1873	17 February 1874	Liberal	Gladstone I	Victoria (1837–1901)
	Stafford Northcote; MP for North Devonshire	21 February 1874	21 April 1880	Conservative	Disraeli II	Victoria (1837–1901)
	William Ewart Gladstone; MP for Midlothian	28 April 1880	16 December 1882	Liberal	Gladstone II	Victoria (1837–1901)
	Hugh Childers; MP for Pontefract	16 December 1882	9 June 1885	Liberal	Gladstone II	Victoria (1837–1901)
	Michael Hicks Beach; MP for Bristol West	24 June 1885	28 January 1886	Conservative	Salisbury I	Victoria (1837–1901)
	William Harcourt; MP for Derby	6 February 1886	20 July 1886	Liberal	Gladstone III	Victoria (1837–1901)
	Lord Randolph Churchill; MP for Paddington South	3 August 1886	22 December 1886	Conservative	Salisbury II	Victoria (1837–1901)
	George Goschen; MP for St George Hanover Square	14 January 1887	11 August 1892	Liberal Unionist	Salisbury II	Victoria (1837–1901)
	William Harcourt; MP for Derby	18 August 1892	21 June 1895	Liberal	Gladstone IV	Victoria (1837–1901)
	William Harcourt; MP for Derby	18 August 1892	21 June 1895	Liberal	Rosebery	Victoria (1837–1901)
	Michael Hicks Beach; MP for Bristol West	29 June 1895	11 August 1902	Conservative	Salisbury (III & IV) (Con.–Lib.U.)	Victoria (1837–1901)
	Michael Hicks Beach; MP for Bristol West	29 June 1895	11 August 1902	Conservative	Salisbury (III & IV) (Con.–Lib.U.)	Edward VII (1901–1910)
	Charles Ritchie; MP for Croydon	11 August 1902	9 October 1903	Conservative	Balfour	Edward VII (1901–1910)
	Austen Chamberlain; MP for East Worcestershire	9 October 1903	4 December 1905	Liberal Unionist	Balfour	Edward VII (1901–1910)
	Herbert Henry Asquith; MP for East Fife	10 December 1905	16 April 1908	Liberal	Campbell-Bannerman	Edward VII (1901–1910)
	David Lloyd George; MP for Caernarvon Boroughs	16 April 1908	25 May 1915	Liberal	Asquith (I–III)	Edward VII (1901–1910)
	David Lloyd George; MP for Caernarvon Boroughs	16 April 1908	25 May 1915	Liberal	Asquith (I–III)	George V (1910–1936)
	Reginald McKenna; MP for North Monmouthshire	25 May 1915	10 December 1916	Liberal	Asquith Coalition (Lib.–Con.–et al.)	George V (1910–1936)
	Bonar Law MP for Bootle → Glasgow Central (Note: Elected to a new constituency in the 1918 general election.)	10 December 1916	10 January 1919	Conservative	Lloyd George (I & II)	George V (1910–1936)
	Austen Chamberlain; MP for Birmingham West	10 January 1919	1 April 1921	Conservative	Lloyd George (I & II)	George V (1910–1936)
	Robert Horne; MP for Glasgow Hillhead	1 April 1921	19 October 1922	Conservative	Lloyd George (I & II)	George V (1910–1936)
	Stanley Baldwin; MP for Bewdley	27 October 1922	27 August 1923	Conservative	Law	George V (1910–1936)
	Stanley Baldwin; MP for Bewdley	27 October 1922	27 August 1923	Conservative	Baldwin I	George V (1910–1936)
	Neville Chamberlain; MP for Birmingham Ladywood	27 August 1923	22 January 1924	Conservative	Baldwin I	George V (1910–1936)
	Philip Snowden; MP for Colne Valley	22 January 1924	3 November 1924	Labour	MacDonald I	George V (1910–1936)
	Winston Churchill; MP for Epping Chancellorship	6 November 1924	4 June 1929	Conservative	Baldwin II	George V (1910–1936)
	Philip Snowden; MP for Colne Valley	7 June 1929	5 November 1931	Labour	MacDonald II	George V (1910–1936)
	Philip Snowden; MP for Colne Valley	7 June 1929	5 November 1931	National Labour	National I (N.Lab.–Con.–et al.)	George V (1910–1936)
	Neville Chamberlain; MP for Birmingham Edgbaston	5 November 1931	28 May 1937	Conservative	National II	George V (1910–1936)
	Neville Chamberlain; MP for Birmingham Edgbaston	5 November 1931	28 May 1937	Conservative	National III (Con.–N.Lab.–et al.)	George V (1910–1936)
	Neville Chamberlain; MP for Birmingham Edgbaston	5 November 1931	28 May 1937	Conservative	National III (Con.–N.Lab.–et al.)	Edward VIII (1936)
	Neville Chamberlain; MP for Birmingham Edgbaston	5 November 1931	28 May 1937	Conservative	National III (Con.–N.Lab.–et al.)	George VI (1936–1952)
	John Simon; MP for Spen Valley	28 May 1937	12 May 1940	Liberal National	National IV	George VI (1936–1952)
	John Simon; MP for Spen Valley	28 May 1937	12 May 1940	Liberal National	Chamberlain War	George VI (1936–1952)
	Kingsley Wood; MP for Woolwich West	12 May 1940	21 September 1943^{†}	Conservative	Churchill War (All parties)	George VI (1936–1952)
	John Anderson; MP for Combined Scottish Universities	24 September 1943	26 July 1945	Independent (National)	Churchill War (All parties)	George VI (1936–1952)
	John Anderson; MP for Combined Scottish Universities	24 September 1943	26 July 1945	Independent (National)	Churchill Caretaker (Con.–Lib.N.)	George VI (1936–1952)
	Hugh Dalton; MP for Bishop Auckland	27 July 1945	13 November 1947	Labour	Attlee (I & II)	George VI (1936–1952)
	Stafford Cripps MP for Bristol East → Bristol South East (Note: Elected to a new constituency in the 1950 general election.)	13 November 1947	19 October 1950	Labour	Attlee (I & II)	George VI (1936–1952)
	Hugh Gaitskell; MP for Leeds South	19 October 1950	26 October 1951	Labour	Attlee (I & II)	George VI (1936–1952)
	Richard Austen Butler; MP for Saffron Walden	26 October 1951	20 December 1955	Conservative	Churchill III	George VI (1936–1952)
	Richard Austen Butler; MP for Saffron Walden	26 October 1951	20 December 1955	Conservative	Churchill III	Elizabeth II (1952–2022)
	Richard Austen Butler; MP for Saffron Walden	26 October 1951	20 December 1955	Conservative	Eden	Elizabeth II (1952–2022)
	Harold Macmillan; MP for Bromley	20 December 1955	13 January 1957	Conservative	Eden	Elizabeth II (1952–2022)
	Peter Thorneycroft; MP for Monmouth	13 January 1957	6 January 1958	Conservative	Macmillan (I & II)	Elizabeth II (1952–2022)
	Derick Heathcoat-Amory; MP for Tiverton	6 January 1958	27 July 1960	Conservative	Macmillan (I & II)	Elizabeth II (1952–2022)
	Selwyn Lloyd; MP for Wirral	27 July 1960	13 July 1962	Conservative	Macmillan (I & II)	Elizabeth II (1952–2022)
	Reginald Maudling; MP for Barnet	16 July 1962	16 October 1964	Conservative	Macmillan (I & II)	Elizabeth II (1952–2022)
	Reginald Maudling; MP for Barnet	16 July 1962	16 October 1964	Conservative	Douglas-Home	Elizabeth II (1952–2022)
	James Callaghan; MP for Cardiff South East	17 October 1964	29 November 1967	Labour	Wilson (I & II)	Elizabeth II (1952–2022)
	Roy Jenkins; MP for Birmingham Stechford	29 November 1967	19 June 1970	Labour	Wilson (I & II)	Elizabeth II (1952–2022)
	Iain Macleod; MP for Enfield West	20 June 1970	20 July 1970^{†}	Conservative	Heath	Elizabeth II (1952–2022)
	Anthony Barber; MP for Altrincham and Sale	25 July 1970	4 March 1974	Conservative	Heath	Elizabeth II (1952–2022)
	Denis Healey; MP for Leeds East	5 March 1974	4 May 1979	Labour	Wilson (III & IV)	Elizabeth II (1952–2022)
	Denis Healey; MP for Leeds East	5 March 1974	4 May 1979	Labour	Callaghan	Elizabeth II (1952–2022)
	Geoffrey Howe; MP for East Surrey	4 May 1979	11 June 1983	Conservative	Thatcher I	Elizabeth II (1952–2022)
	Nigel Lawson; MP for Blaby	11 June 1983	26 October 1989	Conservative	Thatcher II	Elizabeth II (1952–2022)
	Nigel Lawson; MP for Blaby	11 June 1983	26 October 1989	Conservative	Thatcher III	Elizabeth II (1952–2022)
	John Major; MP for Huntingdon	26 October 1989	28 November 1990	Conservative	Thatcher III	Elizabeth II (1952–2022)
	Norman Lamont; MP for Kingston-upon-Thames	28 November 1990	27 May 1993	Conservative	Major I	Elizabeth II (1952–2022)
	Norman Lamont; MP for Kingston-upon-Thames	28 November 1990	27 May 1993	Conservative	Major II	Elizabeth II (1952–2022)
	Kenneth Clarke; MP for Rushcliffe	27 May 1993	2 May 1997	Conservative	Major II	Elizabeth II (1952–2022)
	Gordon Brown MP for Dunfermline East → Kirkcaldy and Cowdenbeath (Note: Elected to a new constituency in the 2005 general election.) Chancellorship	2 May 1997	28 June 2007	Labour	Blair (I, II & III)	Elizabeth II (1952–2022)
	Alistair Darling; MP for Edinburgh South West	28 June 2007	11 May 2010	Labour	Brown	Elizabeth II (1952–2022)
	George Osborne; MP for Tatton Chancellorship	11 May 2010	13 July 2016	Conservative	Cameron–Clegg (Con.–L.D.)	Elizabeth II (1952–2022)
	George Osborne; MP for Tatton Chancellorship	11 May 2010	13 July 2016	Conservative	Cameron II	Elizabeth II (1952–2022)
	Philip Hammond; MP for Runnymede and Weybridge	13 July 2016	24 July 2019	Conservative	May I	Elizabeth II (1952–2022)
	Philip Hammond; MP for Runnymede and Weybridge	13 July 2016	24 July 2019	Conservative	May II	Elizabeth II (1952–2022)
	Sajid Javid; MP for Bromsgrove	24 July 2019	13 February 2020	Conservative	Johnson I	Elizabeth II (1952–2022)
	Sajid Javid; MP for Bromsgrove	24 July 2019	13 February 2020	Conservative	Johnson II	Elizabeth II (1952–2022)
	Rishi Sunak; MP for Richmond (Yorks) Chancellorship	13 February 2020	5 July 2022	Conservative	Johnson II	Elizabeth II (1952–2022)
	Nadhim Zahawi; MP for Stratford-on-Avon	5 July 2022	6 September 2022	Conservative	Johnson II	Elizabeth II (1952–2022)
‍	Kwasi Kwarteng; MP for Spelthorne	6 September 2022	14 October 2022	Conservative	Truss	Elizabeth II (1952–2022)
	Kwasi Kwarteng; MP for Spelthorne	6 September 2022	14 October 2022	Conservative	Truss	Charles III (2022–present)
	Jeremy Hunt; MP for South West Surrey Chancellorship	14 October 2022	5 July 2024	Conservative	Truss	Charles III (2022–present)
	Jeremy Hunt; MP for South West Surrey Chancellorship	14 October 2022	5 July 2024	Conservative	Sunak	Charles III (2022–present)
	Rachel Reeves; MP for Leeds West and Pudsey Chancellorship	5 July 2024	20 July 2026	Labour	Starmer	Charles III (2022–present)
	John Healey; MP for Rawmarsh and Conisbrough Chancellorship	20 July 2026	present	Labour	Burnham	Charles III (2022–present)

== See also ==
- List of lord high treasurers of England and Great Britain
