= Gladstone ministry =

Gladstone ministry may refer to:

- First Gladstone ministry, the British majority government led by William Gladstone from 1868 to 1874
- Second Gladstone ministry, the British majority government led by Gladstone from 1880 to 1885
- Third Gladstone ministry, the British minority government led by Gladstone from February to July 1886
- Fourth Gladstone ministry, the British minority government led by Gladstone from 1892 to 1894

== See also ==
- Premierships of William Ewart Gladstone
