= Donald Southgate =

Donald Southgate may refer to:

- Donald W. Southgate (1887–1953), American architect
- Donald Southgate (historian) (1924–2005), British historian
