= List of prime ministers of the United Kingdom =

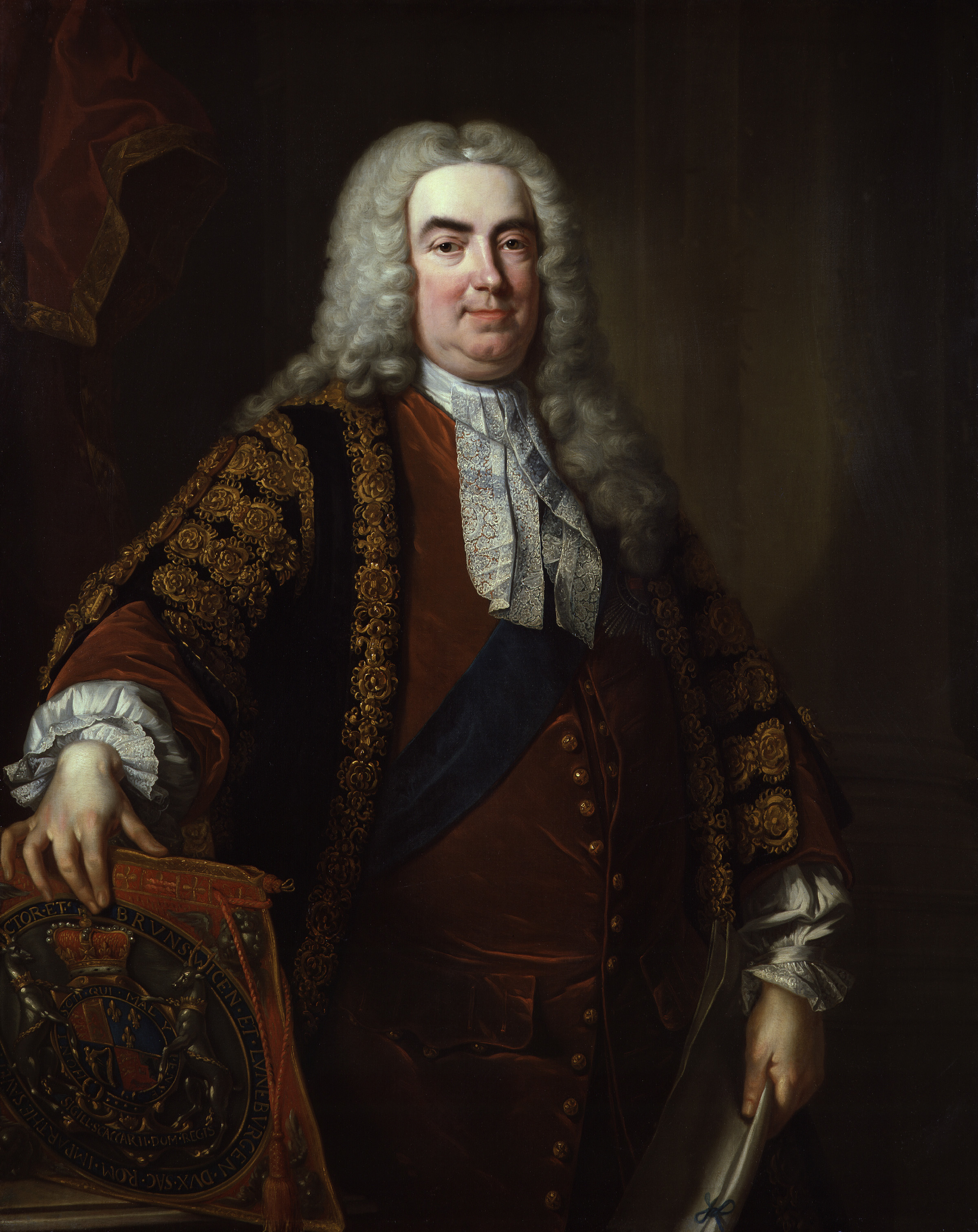
Robert Walpole is considered the first prime minister of Great Britain.

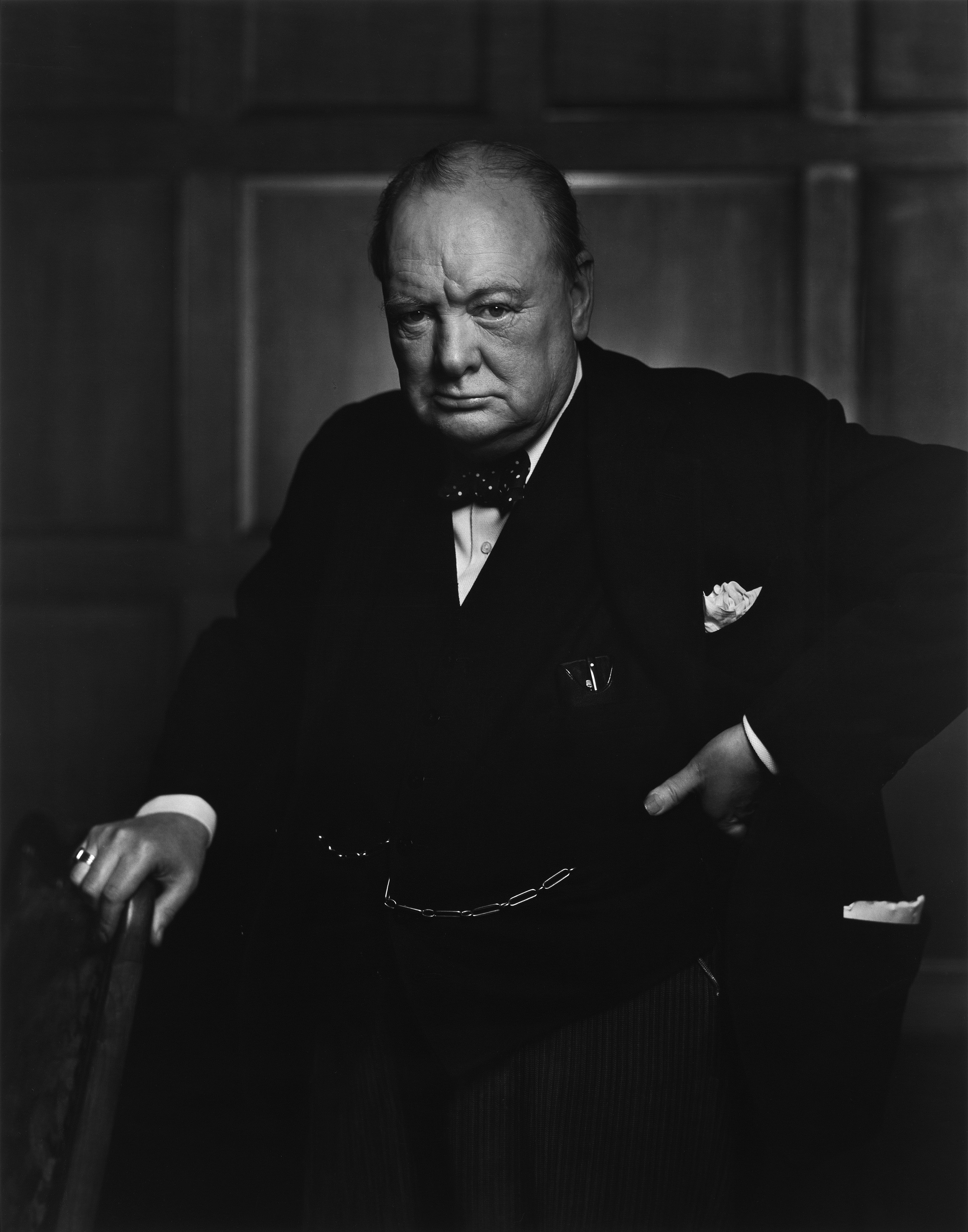
Winston Churchill, the prime minister during much of the Second World War

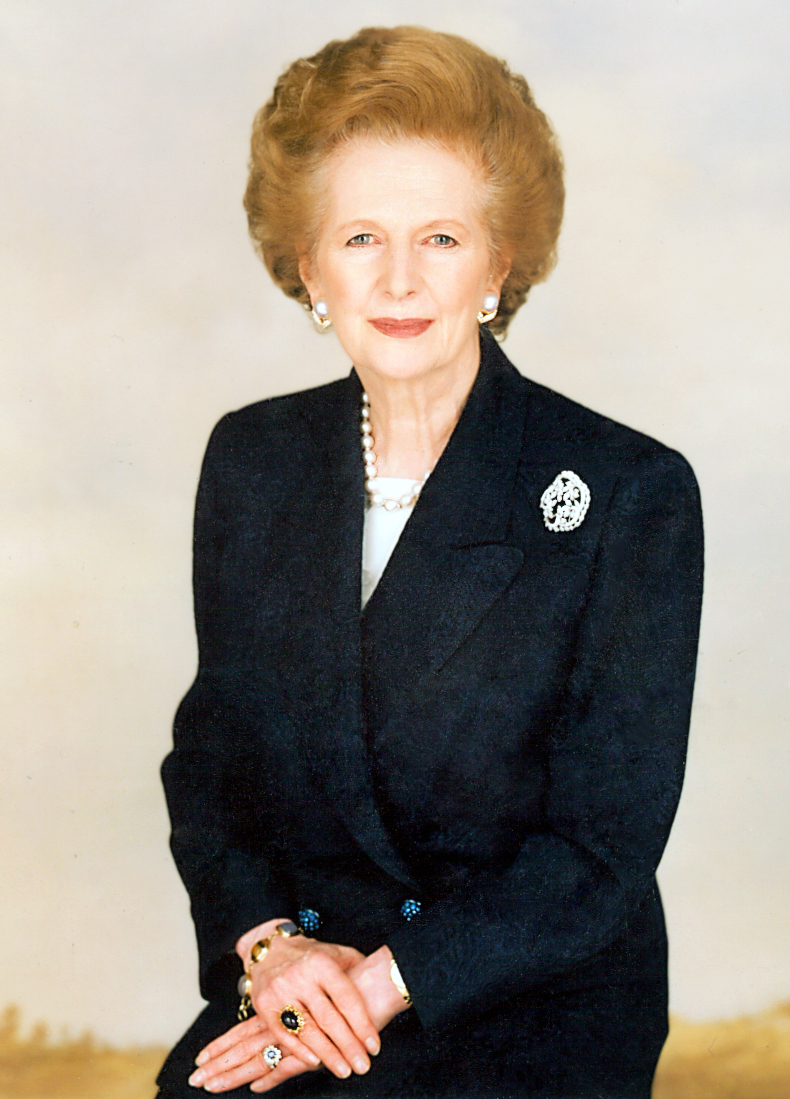
Margaret Thatcher, the first female prime minister

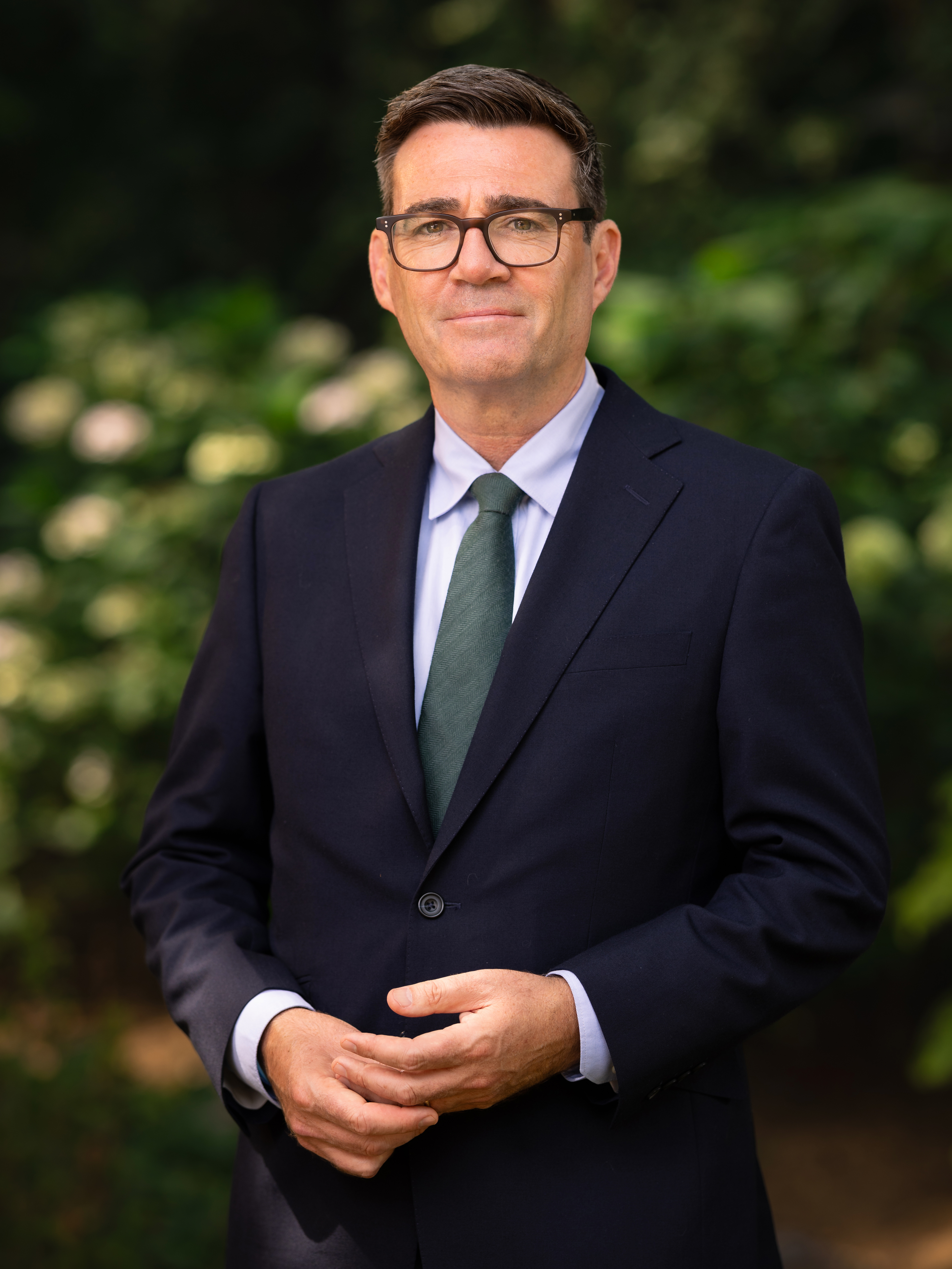
Andy Burnham, the current prime minister

The prime minister of the United Kingdom is the principal minister of the Crown of His Majesty's Government, and the head of the British Cabinet.

There is no specific date for when the office of prime minister first appeared, as the role was not created but rather evolved over time through a merger of duties. The term was regularly, if informally, used by Robert Walpole by the 1730s. It was used in the House of Commons as early as 1805, and it was certainly in parliamentary use by the 1880s, but did not become the official title until 1905, when Henry Campbell-Bannerman was prime minister.

Historians generally consider Robert Walpole, who led the government of the Kingdom of Great Britain for over twenty years from 1721, to be the first prime minister. Walpole is also the longest-serving British prime minister by this definition. The first prime minister of the United Kingdom of Great Britain and Ireland was William Pitt the Younger at its creation on 1 January 1801. The first to use the title in an official act was Benjamin Disraeli who signed the 1878 Treaty of Berlin as "Prime Minister of Her Britannic Majesty".

In 1905, the post of prime minister was officially given recognition in the order of precedence, with the incumbent Henry Campbell-Bannerman the first officially referred to as "prime minister". The first prime minister of the current United Kingdom of Great Britain and Northern Ireland upon its creation in 1922 (when 26 Irish counties seceded and created the Irish Free State) was Andrew Bonar Law, although the country was not renamed officially until 1927, when Stanley Baldwin was the serving prime minister.

== Before the Kingdom of Great Britain ==
=== Kingdom of England ===
Before the Union of England and Scotland in 1707, the Treasury of England was led by the Lord High Treasurer. By the late Tudor period, the Lord High Treasurer was regarded as one of the Great Officers of State, and was often (though not always) the dominant figure in government: Edward Seymour, 1st Duke of Somerset (lord high treasurer, 1547–1549), served as lord protector to his young nephew King Edward VI; William Cecil, 1st Baron Burghley (lord high treasurer, 1572–1598), was the dominant minister to Queen Elizabeth I; Burghley's son Robert Cecil, 1st Earl of Salisbury, succeeded his father as chief minister to Elizabeth (1598–1603) and was eventually appointed by King James I as lord high treasurer (1608–1612).

By the late Stuart period, the Treasury was often run not by a single individual (i.e., the lord high treasurer) but by a commission of lords of the Treasury, led by the first lord of the Treasury. The last lords high treasurer, Sidney Godolphin, 1st Earl of Godolphin (1702–1710) and Robert Harley, 1st Earl of Oxford (1711–1714), ran the government of Queen Anne.

=== Kingdom of Scotland ===
The Chancellor of Scotland was effectively the first minister of the kingdom. His department, the chancery, was responsible for the Great Seal, which was needed to process the inheritance of land titles and the confirmation of land transfers. His key responsibility was to preside at meetings of the privy council, and on those rare occasions he attended, at meetings of the court of session. The last Chancellor of Scotland, who ran the government during Queen Anne's reign, was James Ogilvy, 1st Earl of Seafield.

== From 1707 to 1721 ==
Following the succession of George I in 1714, the arrangement of a commission of lords of the Treasury (as opposed to a single lord high treasurer) became permanent. For the next three years, the government was headed by Charles Townshend, 2nd Viscount Townshend, who was appointed Secretary of State for the Northern Department. Subsequently, Lords Stanhope and Sunderland ran the government jointly, with Stanhope managing foreign affairs and Sunderland domestic. Stanhope died in February 1721 and Sunderland resigned two months later; Townshend and Robert Walpole were then invited to form the next government. From that point, the holder of the office of first lord also usually (albeit unofficially) held the status of prime minister. It was not until the Edwardian era that the title prime minister was constitutionally recognised. The prime minister still holds the office of first lord by constitutional convention, the only exceptions being the Earl of Chatham and the Marquess of Salisbury.

== Since 1721 ==
=== Prime ministers ===
  - 18th century
  - 19th century
  - 20th century
  - 21st century
  - George I
  - George II
  - George III
  - George IV
  - William IV
  - Victoria
  - Edward VII
  - George V
  - Edward VIII
  - George VI
  - Elizabeth II
  - Charles III
  - Conservative (20)
  - Whig (16)
  - Tory (10)
  - Labour (8)
  - Liberal (6)
  - Scottish Unionists (2)
  - National Labour (1)
  - National Liberal (1)
  - Peelite (1)

List of prime ministers of Great Britain or the United Kingdom since 1721
Portrait	Prime minister Office (Lifespan)	Term of office			Mandate (Note: Legend for the Mandate column: 1722 a year indicates a general election won by the government or that led to the formation of a government (the year links to the election's article); (1830) a parenthesised year indicates an election resulting in no single party winning a Commons majority (the year links to the election's article); — a dash indicates the formation of a majority government without an election; (—) a parenthesised dash indicates the formation of a minority or coalition government during a hung parliament.)	Ministerial offices held as prime minister	Party (Note: Party names in parentheses show a prime minister's party or faction when it differs from that of the government of which they are leader)	Government	Monarch Reign
Portrait	Prime minister Office (Lifespan)	Start	End	Duration	Mandate	Ministerial offices held as prime minister	Party	Government	Monarch Reign
Robert Walpole	Robert Walpole: MP for King's Lynn (to 1742); 1st Earl of Orford (from 1742) (Note: Walpole was made a peer five days before his resignation as Prime Minister (6 February) and thus relinquished his seat in the House of Commons.); (1676–1745)	3 April 1721	11 February 1742	20 years, 315 days	1722	Chancellor of the Exchequer; First Lord of the Treasury; Leader of the House of Commons	Whig	Walpole–Townshend	George I r. 1714–1727
Robert Walpole	Robert Walpole: MP for King's Lynn (to 1742); 1st Earl of Orford (from 1742); (1676–1745)	3 April 1721	11 February 1742	20 years, 315 days	1727	Chancellor of the Exchequer; First Lord of the Treasury; Leader of the House of Commons	Whig	Walpole–Townshend	George II r. 1727–1760
Robert Walpole	Robert Walpole: MP for King's Lynn (to 1742); 1st Earl of Orford (from 1742); (1676–1745)	3 April 1721	11 February 1742	20 years, 315 days	1734	Chancellor of the Exchequer; First Lord of the Treasury; Leader of the House of Commons	Whig	Walpole	George II r. 1727–1760
Robert Walpole	Robert Walpole: MP for King's Lynn (to 1742); 1st Earl of Orford (from 1742); (1676–1745)	3 April 1721	11 February 1742	20 years, 315 days	1741	Chancellor of the Exchequer; First Lord of the Treasury; Leader of the House of Commons	Whig	Walpole	George II r. 1727–1760
Spencer Compton	Spencer Compton: 1st Earl of Wilmington; (1673–1743)	16 February 1742	2 July 1743	1 year, 137 days (Note: Died in office)	—	First Lord of the Treasury	Whig	Carteret	George II r. 1727–1760
Henry Pelham	Henry Pelham: MP for Sussex; (1694–1754)	27 August 1743 (Note: Resigned on 10 February 1746, reappointed by George II on 12 February 1746.)	6 March 1754	10 years, 192 days	—	Chancellor of the Exchequer; First Lord of the Treasury; Leader of the House of Commons	Whig	Broad Bottom I	George II r. 1727–1760
Henry Pelham	Henry Pelham: MP for Sussex; (1694–1754)	27 August 1743	6 March 1754	10 years, 192 days	1747	Chancellor of the Exchequer; First Lord of the Treasury; Leader of the House of Commons	Whig	Broad Bottom II	George II r. 1727–1760
Thomas Pelham-Holles	Thomas Pelham-Holles: 1st Duke of Newcastle; (1693–1768)	16 March 1754	11 November 1756	2 years, 241 days	1754	First Lord of the Treasury; Leader of the House of Lords	Whig	Newcastle I	George II r. 1727–1760
William Cavendish	William Cavendish: 4th Duke of Devonshire; (1720–1764)	16 November 1756	29 June 1757	226 days	—	First Lord of the Treasury; Leader of the House of Lords; Lord Treasurer of Ireland	Whig	Pitt–Devonshire	George II r. 1727–1760
William Cavendish	William Cavendish: 4th Duke of Devonshire; (1720–1764)	16 November 1756	29 June 1757	226 days	—	First Lord of the Treasury; Leader of the House of Lords; Lord Treasurer of Ireland	Whig	1757 Caretaker	George II r. 1727–1760
Thomas Pelham-Holles	Thomas Pelham-Holles: 1st Duke of Newcastle; (1693–1768)	29 June 1757	26 May 1762	4 years, 332 days	1761	First Lord of the Treasury; Leader of the House of Lords	Whig	Pitt–Newcastle	George II r. 1727–1760
Thomas Pelham-Holles	Thomas Pelham-Holles: 1st Duke of Newcastle; (1693–1768)	29 June 1757	26 May 1762	4 years, 332 days	1761	First Lord of the Treasury; Leader of the House of Lords	Whig	Bute–Newcastle (Tory–Whig)	George III r. 1760–1820
John Stuart	John Stuart: 3rd Earl of Bute (Note: As a peer of Scotland, Lord Bute sat in the House of Lords as a Scottish representative peer.); (1713–1792)	26 May 1762	8 April 1763	318 days	—	First Lord of the Treasury; Leader of the House of Lords	Tory	Bute	George III r. 1760–1820
George Grenville	George Grenville: MP for Buckingham; (1712–1770)	16 April 1763	10 July 1765	2 years, 86 days	—	Chancellor of the Exchequer; First Lord of the Treasury; Leader of the House of Commons	Whig (Grenvillite)	Grenville (mainly Whig)	George III r. 1760–1820
Charles Watson-Wentworth	Charles Watson-Wentworth: 2nd Marquess of Rockingham; (1730–1782)	13 July 1765	30 July 1766	1 year, 18 days	—	First Lord of the Treasury; Leader of the House of Lords	Whig (Rockinghamite)	Rockingham I	George III r. 1760–1820
William Pitt the Elder	William Pitt the Elder: MP for Bath (to 1766); 1st Earl of Chatham (from 1766) (Note: Pitt served as a Member of Parliament for the first five days of his premiership (30 July – 4 August 1766). He relinquished his Commons seat in order to take the office of Lord Privy Seal, which required his elevation to the House of Lords.); (1708–1778)	30 July 1766	14 October 1768	2 years, 77 days	1768	Lord Privy Seal	Whig (Chathamite)	Chatham	George III r. 1760–1820
Augustus FitzRoy	Augustus FitzRoy: 3rd Duke of Grafton; (1735–1811)	14 October 1768	28 January 1770	1 year, 107 days	—	First Lord of the Treasury; Leader of the House of Lords	Whig (Chathamite)	Grafton	George III r. 1760–1820
Frederick North, Lord North	Frederick North: Lord North; MP for Banbury (Note: Lord North was the heir to an earldom and himself a commoner while using the courtesy title.); (1732–1792)	28 January 1770	27 March 1782	12 years, 59 days	1774	Chancellor of the Exchequer; First Lord of the Treasury; Leader of the House of Commons	Tory (Northite)	North	George III r. 1760–1820
Frederick North, Lord North	Frederick North: Lord North; MP for Banbury; (1732–1792)	28 January 1770	27 March 1782	12 years, 59 days	1780	Chancellor of the Exchequer; First Lord of the Treasury; Leader of the House of Commons	Tory (Northite)	North	George III r. 1760–1820
Charles Watson-Wentworth	Charles Watson-Wentworth: 2nd Marquess of Rockingham; (1730–1782)	27 March 1782	1 July 1782	97 days	—	First Lord of the Treasury	Whig (Rockinghamite)	Rockingham II	George III r. 1760–1820
William Petty	William Petty: 2nd Earl of Shelburne; (1737–1805)	4 July 1782	26 March 1783	266 days	—	First Lord of the Treasury; Leader of the House of Lords	Whig (Chathamite)	Shelburne	George III r. 1760–1820
William Cavendish-Bentinck	William Cavendish-Bentinck: 3rd Duke of Portland; (1738–1809)	2 April 1783	18 December 1783	261 days	—	First Lord of the Treasury; Leader of the House of Lords	Whig	Fox–North	George III r. 1760–1820
William Pitt the Younger	William Pitt the Younger: MP for Appleby, later Cambridge University (Note: Pitt was returned an MP for a different constituency in the 1784 British general election.); (1759–1806)	19 December 1783	14 March 1801	17 years, 86 days	1784	Chancellor of the Exchequer; First Lord of the Treasury; Leader of the House of Commons	Tory (Pittite)	Pitt I	George III r. 1760–1820
William Pitt the Younger	William Pitt the Younger: MP for Appleby, later Cambridge University; (1759–1806)	19 December 1783	14 March 1801	17 years, 86 days	1790	Chancellor of the Exchequer; First Lord of the Treasury; Leader of the House of Commons	Tory (Pittite)	Pitt I	George III r. 1760–1820
William Pitt the Younger	William Pitt the Younger: MP for Appleby, later Cambridge University; (1759–1806)	19 December 1783	14 March 1801	17 years, 86 days	1796	Chancellor of the Exchequer; First Lord of the Treasury; Leader of the House of Commons	Tory (Pittite)	Pitt I	George III r. 1760–1820
Henry Addington	Henry Addington: MP for Devizes; (1757–1844)	17 March 1801	10 May 1804	3 years, 55 days	1801	Chancellor of the Exchequer; First Lord of the Treasury; Leader of the House of Commons	Tory (Addingtonian)	Addington	George III r. 1760–1820
Henry Addington	Henry Addington: MP for Devizes; (1757–1844)	17 March 1801	10 May 1804	3 years, 55 days	1802	Chancellor of the Exchequer; First Lord of the Treasury; Leader of the House of Commons	Tory (Addingtonian)	Addington	George III r. 1760–1820
William Pitt the Younger	William Pitt the Younger: MP for Cambridge University; (1759–1806)	10 May 1804	23 January 1806	1 year, 259 days	—	Chancellor of the Exchequer; First Lord of the Treasury; Leader of the House of Commons	Tory (Pittite)	Pitt II	George III r. 1760–1820
William Grenville	William Grenville: 1st Baron Grenville; (1759–1834)	11 February 1806	25 March 1807	1 year, 43 days	1806	First Lord of the Treasury; Leader of the House of Lords	Whig	All the Talents (Whig–Tory)	George III r. 1760–1820
William Cavendish-Bentinck	William Cavendish-Bentinck: 3rd Duke of Portland; (1738–1809)	31 March 1807	4 October 1809	2 years, 188 days	1807	First Lord of the Treasury	Tory (Pittite)	Portland II	George III r. 1760–1820
Spencer Perceval	Spencer Perceval: MP for Northampton; (1762–1812)	4 October 1809	11 May 1812	2 years, 221 days	—	Chancellor of the Duchy of Lancaster; Chancellor of the Exchequer; Commissioner of the Treasury for Ireland (1810–1812); First Lord of the Treasury; Leader of the House of Commons	Tory (Pittite)	Perceval	George III r. 1760–1820
Robert Jenkinson	Robert Jenkinson: 2nd Earl of Liverpool; (1770–1828)	8 June 1812	9 April 1827	14 years, 306 days	1812	First Lord of the Treasury; Leader of the House of Lords	Tory (Pittite)	Liverpool	George III r. 1760–1820
Robert Jenkinson	Robert Jenkinson: 2nd Earl of Liverpool; (1770–1828)	8 June 1812	9 April 1827	14 years, 306 days	1818	First Lord of the Treasury; Leader of the House of Lords	Tory (Pittite)	Liverpool	George IV r. 1820–1830
Robert Jenkinson	Robert Jenkinson: 2nd Earl of Liverpool; (1770–1828)	8 June 1812	9 April 1827	14 years, 306 days	1820	First Lord of the Treasury; Leader of the House of Lords	Tory (Pittite)	Liverpool	George IV r. 1820–1830
Robert Jenkinson	Robert Jenkinson: 2nd Earl of Liverpool; (1770–1828)	8 June 1812	9 April 1827	14 years, 306 days	1826	First Lord of the Treasury; Leader of the House of Lords	Tory (Pittite)	Liverpool	George IV r. 1820–1830
George Canning	George Canning: MP for Seaford; (1770–1827)	12 April 1827	8 August 1827	119 days	—	Chancellor of the Exchequer; First Lord of the Treasury; Leader of the House of Commons	Tory (Canningite)	Canning (Canningite–Whig)	George IV r. 1820–1830
F. J. Robinson	Frederick John Robinson: 1st Viscount Goderich; (1782–1859)	31 August 1827	8 January 1828	131 days	—	First Lord of the Treasury; Leader of the House of Lords	Tory (Canningite)	Goderich	George IV r. 1820–1830
Arthur Wellesley, 1st Duke of Wellington	Arthur Wellesley: 1st Duke of Wellington; (1769–1852)	22 January 1828	16 November 1830	2 years, 299 days	—	First Lord of the Treasury; Leader of the House of Lords	Tory	Wellington–Peel	George IV r. 1820–1830
Arthur Wellesley, 1st Duke of Wellington	Arthur Wellesley: 1st Duke of Wellington; (1769–1852)	22 January 1828	16 November 1830	2 years, 299 days	(1830)	First Lord of the Treasury; Leader of the House of Lords	Tory	Wellington–Peel	William IV r. 1830–1837
Charles Grey, 2nd Earl Grey	Charles Grey: 2nd Earl Grey; (1764–1845)	22 November 1830	9 July 1834	3 years, 230 days	1831	First Lord of the Treasury; Leader of the House of Lords	Whig	Grey	William IV r. 1830–1837
Charles Grey, 2nd Earl Grey	Charles Grey: 2nd Earl Grey; (1764–1845)	22 November 1830	9 July 1834	3 years, 230 days	1832	First Lord of the Treasury; Leader of the House of Lords	Whig	Grey	William IV r. 1830–1837
William Lamb, 2nd Viscount Melbourne	William Lamb: 2nd Viscount Melbourne; (1779–1848)	16 July 1834	14 November 1834	122 days	—	First Lord of the Treasury; Leader of the House of Lords	Whig	Melbourne I	William IV r. 1830–1837
photograph	Arthur Wellesley: 1st Duke of Wellington; (1769–1852)	17 November 1834	9 December 1834	23 days	(—)	First Lord of the Treasury; Leader of the House of Lords; Sec. of State for Foreign Affairs; Sec. of State for the Home Dept; Sec. of State for War & Colonies	Tory	Wellington Caretaker	William IV r. 1830–1837
Robert Peel	Robert Peel: Baronet; MP for Tamworth; (1788–1850)	10 December 1834	8 April 1835	120 days	(—)	Chancellor of the Exchequer; First Lord of the Treasury; Leader of the House of Commons	Conservative	Peel I	William IV r. 1830–1837
William Lamb, 2nd Viscount Melbourne	William Lamb: 2nd Viscount Melbourne; (1779–1848)	18 April 1835	30 August 1841	6 years, 135 days	1835	First Lord of the Treasury; Leader of the House of Lords	Whig	Melbourne II	William IV r. 1830–1837
William Lamb, 2nd Viscount Melbourne	William Lamb: 2nd Viscount Melbourne; (1779–1848)	18 April 1835	30 August 1841	6 years, 135 days	1837	First Lord of the Treasury; Leader of the House of Lords	Whig	Melbourne II	Victoria r. 1837–1901
Robert Peel	Robert Peel: Baronet; MP for Tamworth; (1788–1850)	30 August 1841	29 June 1846	4 years, 304 days	1841	First Lord of the Treasury; Leader of the House of Commons	Conservative	Peel II	Victoria r. 1837–1901
photograph	Lord John Russell: MP for City of London; (1792–1878)	30 June 1846	21 February 1852	5 years, 237 days	(1847)	First Lord of the Treasury; Leader of the House of Commons	Whig	Russell I	Victoria r. 1837–1901
painting	Edward Smith-Stanley: 14th Earl of Derby; (1799–1869)	23 February 1852	17 December 1852	299 days	1852	First Lord of the Treasury; Leader of the House of Lords	Conservative	Who? Who?	Victoria r. 1837–1901
engraving	George Hamilton-Gordon: 4th Earl of Aberdeen; (1784–1860)	19 December 1852	30 January 1855	2 years, 43 days	(—)	First Lord of the Treasury; Leader of the House of Lords	Peelite	Aberdeen (Peelite–Whig–others)	Victoria r. 1837–1901
photograph	Henry John Temple: 3rd Viscount Palmerston; MP for Tiverton (Note: As a peer of Ireland, Lord Palmerston sat in the House of Commons as a Member of Parliament for an English constituency which was enabled by the Acts of Union 1800.); (1784–1865)	6 February 1855	19 February 1858	3 years, 14 days	1857	First Lord of the Treasury; Leader of the House of Commons	Whig	Palmerston I	Victoria r. 1837–1901
engraving	Edward Smith-Stanley: 14th Earl of Derby; (1799–1869)	20 February 1858	11 June 1859	1 year, 112 days	(—)	First Lord of the Treasury; Leader of the House of Lords	Conservative	Derby–Disraeli II	Victoria r. 1837–1901
photograph	Henry John Temple: 3rd Viscount Palmerston; MP for Tiverton; (1784–1865)	12 June 1859	18 October 1865	6 years, 129 days	1859	First Lord of the Treasury; Leader of the House of Commons	Liberal	Palmerston II	Victoria r. 1837–1901
photograph	Henry John Temple: 3rd Viscount Palmerston; MP for Tiverton; (1784–1865)	12 June 1859	18 October 1865	6 years, 129 days	1865	First Lord of the Treasury; Leader of the House of Commons	Liberal	Palmerston II	Victoria r. 1837–1901
photograph	John Russell: 1st Earl Russell; (1792–1878)	29 October 1865	26 June 1866	241 days	—	First Lord of the Treasury; Leader of the House of Lords	Liberal	Russell II	Victoria r. 1837–1901
engraving	Edward Smith-Stanley: 14th Earl of Derby; (1799–1869)	28 June 1866	25 February 1868	1 year, 243 days	(—)	First Lord of the Treasury; Leader of the House of Lords	Conservative	Derby–Disraeli III	Victoria r. 1837–1901
photograph	Benjamin Disraeli: MP for Buckinghamshire; (1804–1881); Premierships	27 February 1868	1 December 1868	279 days	(—)	First Lord of the Treasury; Leader of the House of Commons	Conservative	Derby–Disraeli III	Victoria r. 1837–1901
photograph	William Ewart Gladstone: MP for Greenwich; (1809–1898); Premierships	3 December 1868	17 February 1874	5 years, 77 days	1868	Chancellor of the Exchequer (1873–1874); First Lord of the Treasury; Leader of the House of Commons	Liberal	Gladstone I	Victoria r. 1837–1901
photograph	Benjamin Disraeli: MP for Buckinghamshire (to 1876); Earl of Beaconsfield (from 1876) (Note: Disraeli was elevated to the House of Lords in 1876, two years into his second premiership. Consequently, he relinquished his Commons seat as MP for Buckinghamshire.); (1804–1881); Premierships	20 February 1874	21 April 1880	6 years, 62 days	1874	First Lord of the Treasury; Leader of the House of Commons (1874–1876); Leader of the House of Lords (1876–1880); Lord Privy Seal (1876–1878)	Conservative	Disraeli II	Victoria r. 1837–1901
photograph	William Ewart Gladstone: MP for Midlothian; (1809–1898); Premierships	23 April 1880	9 June 1885	5 years, 48 days	1880	Chancellor of the Exchequer (1880–1882); First Lord of the Treasury; Leader of the House of Commons	Liberal	Gladstone II	Victoria r. 1837–1901
photograph	Robert Gascoyne-Cecil: 3rd Marquess of Salisbury; (1830–1903)	23 June 1885	28 January 1886	220 days	(—)	Leader of the House of Lords; Sec. of State for Foreign Affairs	Conservative	Salisbury I	Victoria r. 1837–1901
photograph	William Ewart Gladstone: MP for Midlothian; (1809–1898); Premierships	1 February 1886	20 July 1886	170 days	(1885)	First Lord of the Treasury; Leader of the House of Commons; Lord Privy Seal	Liberal	Gladstone III	Victoria r. 1837–1901
photograph	Robert Gascoyne-Cecil: 3rd Marquess of Salisbury; (1830–1903)	25 July 1886	11 August 1892	6 years, 18 days	(1886)	First Lord of the Treasury (1886–1887); Leader of the House of Lords; Sec. of State for Foreign Affairs (1887–1892)	Conservative	Salisbury II	Victoria r. 1837–1901
photograph	William Ewart Gladstone: MP for Midlothian; (1809–1898); Premierships	15 August 1892	2 March 1894	1 year, 200 days	(1892)	First Lord of the Treasury; Leader of the House of Commons; Lord Privy Seal	Liberal	Gladstone IV	Victoria r. 1837–1901
photograph	Archibald Primrose: 5th Earl of Rosebery; (1847–1929)	5 March 1894	22 June 1895	1 year, 110 days	(—)	First Lord of the Treasury; Leader of the House of Lords; Lord President of the Council	Liberal	Rosebery	Victoria r. 1837–1901
photograph	Robert Gascoyne-Cecil: 3rd Marquess of Salisbury; (1830–1903)	25 June 1895	11 July 1902	7 years, 17 days	1895	Leader of the House of Lords; Lord Privy Seal (1900–1902); Sec. of State for Foreign Affairs (1895–1900)	Conservative	Salisbury III (Con–Lib.U)	Victoria r. 1837–1901
photograph	Robert Gascoyne-Cecil: 3rd Marquess of Salisbury; (1830–1903)	25 June 1895	11 July 1902	7 years, 17 days	1900	Leader of the House of Lords; Lord Privy Seal (1900–1902); Sec. of State for Foreign Affairs (1895–1900)	Conservative	Salisbury IV (Con–Lib.U)	Victoria r. 1837–1901
photograph	Robert Gascoyne-Cecil: 3rd Marquess of Salisbury; (1830–1903)	25 June 1895	11 July 1902	7 years, 17 days	1900	Leader of the House of Lords; Lord Privy Seal (1900–1902); Sec. of State for Foreign Affairs (1895–1900)	Conservative	Salisbury IV (Con–Lib.U)	Edward VII r. 1901–1910
photograph	Arthur Balfour: MP for Manchester East; (1848–1930)	12 July 1902	4 December 1905	3 years, 146 days	—	First Lord of the Treasury; Leader of the House of Commons; Lord Privy Seal (1902–1903)	Conservative	Balfour (Con–Lib.U)	Edward VII r. 1901–1910
photograph	Henry Campbell-Bannerman: MP for Stirling Burghs; (1836–1908)	5 December 1905	3 April 1908	2 years, 121 days	1906	First Lord of the Treasury; Leader of the House of Commons	Liberal	Campbell-Bannerman	Edward VII r. 1901–1910
photograph	H. H. Asquith: MP for East Fife; (1852–1928)	8 April 1908	5 December 1916	8 years, 243 days	—	First Lord of the Treasury; Leader of the House of Commons; Sec. of State for War (1914)	Liberal	Asquith I	Edward VII r. 1901–1910
photograph	H. H. Asquith: MP for East Fife; (1852–1928)	8 April 1908	5 December 1916	8 years, 243 days	(Jan 1910)	First Lord of the Treasury; Leader of the House of Commons; Sec. of State for War (1914)	Liberal	Asquith II	George V r. 1910–1936
photograph	H. H. Asquith: MP for East Fife; (1852–1928)	8 April 1908	5 December 1916	8 years, 243 days	(Dec 1910)	First Lord of the Treasury; Leader of the House of Commons; Sec. of State for War (1914)	Liberal	Asquith III	George V r. 1910–1936
photograph	H. H. Asquith: MP for East Fife; (1852–1928)	8 April 1908	5 December 1916	8 years, 243 days	(—)	First Lord of the Treasury; Leader of the House of Commons; Sec. of State for War (1914)	Liberal	Asquith Coalition (Lib–Con–others)	George V r. 1910–1936
photograph	David Lloyd George: MP for Carnarvon Boroughs; (1863–1945)	6 December 1916	19 October 1922	5 years, 318 days	(—)	First Lord of the Treasury	Coalition Liberal (1916–1922); National Liberal (1922)	Lloyd George War	George V r. 1910–1936
photograph	David Lloyd George: MP for Carnarvon Boroughs; (1863–1945)	6 December 1916	19 October 1922	5 years, 318 days	1918	First Lord of the Treasury	Coalition Liberal (1916–1922); National Liberal (1922)	Lloyd George II (Nat Lib–Con)	George V r. 1910–1936
photograph	Bonar Law: MP for Glasgow Central; (1858–1923)	23 October 1922	20 May 1923	210 days	1922	First Lord of the Treasury; Leader of the House of Commons	Conservative (Scot.U.)	Law	George V r. 1910–1936
photograph	Stanley Baldwin: MP for Bewdley; (1867–1947)	22 May 1923	22 January 1924	246 days	—	Chancellor of the Exchequer (1923); First Lord of the Treasury; Leader of the House of Commons	Conservative	Baldwin I	George V r. 1910–1936
photograph	Ramsay MacDonald: MP for Aberavon; (1866–1937)	22 January 1924	4 November 1924	288 days	(1923)	First Lord of the Treasury; Leader of the House of Commons; Sec. of State for Foreign Affairs	Labour	MacDonald I	George V r. 1910–1936
photograph	Stanley Baldwin: MP for Bewdley; (1867–1947)	4 November 1924	4 June 1929	4 years, 213 days	1924	First Lord of the Treasury; Leader of the House of Commons	Conservative	Baldwin II	George V r. 1910–1936
photograph	Ramsay MacDonald: MP for Seaham; (1866–1937)	5 June 1929	7 June 1935	6 years, 3 days	(1929)	First Lord of the Treasury; Leader of the House of Commons	Labour	MacDonald II	George V r. 1910–1936
photograph	Ramsay MacDonald: MP for Seaham; (1866–1937)	5 June 1929	7 June 1935	6 years, 3 days	(—)	First Lord of the Treasury; Leader of the House of Commons	National Labour	National I (Nat.Lab–Con–others)	George V r. 1910–1936
photograph	Ramsay MacDonald: MP for Seaham; (1866–1937)	5 June 1929	7 June 1935	6 years, 3 days	1931	First Lord of the Treasury; Leader of the House of Commons	National Labour	National II	George V r. 1910–1936
photograph	Stanley Baldwin: MP for Bewdley; (1867–1947)	7 June 1935	28 May 1937	1 year, 356 days	1935	First Lord of the Treasury; Leader of the House of Commons	Conservative	National III	George V r. 1910–1936
photograph	Stanley Baldwin: MP for Bewdley; (1867–1947)	7 June 1935	28 May 1937	1 year, 356 days	1935	First Lord of the Treasury; Leader of the House of Commons	Conservative	National III	Edward VIII r. 1936
photograph	Stanley Baldwin: MP for Bewdley; (1867–1947)	7 June 1935	28 May 1937	1 year, 356 days	1935	First Lord of the Treasury; Leader of the House of Commons	Conservative	National III	George VI r. 1936–1952
photograph	Neville Chamberlain: MP for Birmingham Edgbaston; (1869–1940)	28 May 1937	10 May 1940	2 years, 349 days	—	First Lord of the Treasury; Leader of the House of Commons	Conservative	National IV	George VI r. 1936–1952
photograph	Neville Chamberlain: MP for Birmingham Edgbaston; (1869–1940)	28 May 1937	10 May 1940	2 years, 349 days	—	First Lord of the Treasury; Leader of the House of Commons	Conservative	Chamberlain War	George VI r. 1936–1952
photograph	Winston Churchill: MP for Epping; (1874–1965)	10 May 1940	26 July 1945	5 years, 78 days	—	First Lord of the Treasury; Leader of the House of Commons (1940–1942); Minister of Defence	Conservative	Churchill War	George VI r. 1936–1952
photograph	Winston Churchill: MP for Epping; (1874–1965)	10 May 1940	26 July 1945	5 years, 78 days	—	First Lord of the Treasury; Leader of the House of Commons (1940–1942); Minister of Defence	Conservative	Churchill Caretaker (Con–Nat.Lib)	George VI r. 1936–1952
photograph	Clement Attlee: MP for Limehouse; (1883–1967)	26 July 1945	26 October 1951	6 years, 93 days	1945	First Lord of the Treasury; Minister of Defence (1945–1946)	Labour	Attlee I	George VI r. 1936–1952
photograph	Clement Attlee: MP for Limehouse; (1883–1967)	26 July 1945	26 October 1951	6 years, 93 days	1950	First Lord of the Treasury; Minister of Defence (1945–1946)	Labour	Attlee II	George VI r. 1936–1952
photograph	Winston Churchill: MP for Woodford; (1874–1965)	26 October 1951	5 April 1955	3 years, 162 days	1951	First Lord of the Treasury; Minister of Defence (1951–1952)	Conservative	Churchill III	George VI r. 1936–1952
photograph	Winston Churchill: MP for Woodford; (1874–1965)	26 October 1951	5 April 1955	3 years, 162 days	1951	First Lord of the Treasury; Minister of Defence (1951–1952)	Conservative	Churchill III	Elizabeth II r. 1952–2022
photograph	Anthony Eden: MP for Warwick and Leamington; (1897–1977)	6 April 1955	9 January 1957	1 year, 279 days	1955	First Lord of the Treasury	Conservative	Eden	Elizabeth II r. 1952–2022
photograph	Harold Macmillan: MP for Bromley; (1894–1986)	10 January 1957	18 October 1963	6 years, 282 days	—	First Lord of the Treasury	Conservative	Macmillan I	Elizabeth II r. 1952–2022
photograph	Harold Macmillan: MP for Bromley; (1894–1986)	10 January 1957	18 October 1963	6 years, 282 days	1959	First Lord of the Treasury	Conservative	Macmillan II	Elizabeth II r. 1952–2022
photograph	Alec Douglas-Home: 14th Earl of Home (to 1963); MP for Kinross and Western Perthshire (from 1963) (Note: Douglas-Home disclaimed his peerage as the Earl of Home on 23 October 1963, 4 days after his appointment as Prime Minister. He was returned an MP and took his seat in the House of Commons on 12 November 1963. He had no seats in either of the Houses of Parliament between the two dates.); (1903–1995)	19 October 1963	16 October 1964	364 days	—	First Lord of the Treasury	Conservative (Scot.U.)	Douglas-Home	Elizabeth II r. 1952–2022
photograph	Harold Wilson: MP for Huyton; (1916–1995); Premiership	16 October 1964	19 June 1970	5 years, 247 days	1964	First Lord of the Treasury; Minister for the Civil Service (1968–1970)	Labour	Wilson I	Elizabeth II r. 1952–2022
photograph	Harold Wilson: MP for Huyton; (1916–1995); Premiership	16 October 1964	19 June 1970	5 years, 247 days	1966	First Lord of the Treasury; Minister for the Civil Service (1968–1970)	Labour	Wilson II	Elizabeth II r. 1952–2022
photograph	Edward Heath: MP for Bexley; (1916–2005)	19 June 1970	4 March 1974	3 years, 259 days	1970	First Lord of the Treasury; Minister for the Civil Service	Conservative	Heath	Elizabeth II r. 1952–2022
photograph	Harold Wilson: MP for Huyton; (1916–1995); Premiership	4 March 1974	5 April 1976	2 years, 33 days	(Feb 1974)	First Lord of the Treasury; Minister for the Civil Service	Labour	Wilson III	Elizabeth II r. 1952–2022
photograph	Harold Wilson: MP for Huyton; (1916–1995); Premiership	4 March 1974	5 April 1976	2 years, 33 days	Oct 1974	First Lord of the Treasury; Minister for the Civil Service	Labour	Wilson IV	Elizabeth II r. 1952–2022
photograph	James Callaghan: MP for Cardiff South East; (1912–2005)	5 April 1976	4 May 1979	3 years, 30 days	—	First Lord of the Treasury; Minister for the Civil Service	Labour	Callaghan	Elizabeth II r. 1952–2022
photograph	Margaret Thatcher: MP for Finchley; (1925–2013); Premiership	4 May 1979	28 November 1990	11 years, 209 days	1979	First Lord of the Treasury; Minister for the Civil Service	Conservative	Thatcher I	Elizabeth II r. 1952–2022
photograph	Margaret Thatcher: MP for Finchley; (1925–2013); Premiership	4 May 1979	28 November 1990	11 years, 209 days	1983	First Lord of the Treasury; Minister for the Civil Service	Conservative	Thatcher II	Elizabeth II r. 1952–2022
photograph	Margaret Thatcher: MP for Finchley; (1925–2013); Premiership	4 May 1979	28 November 1990	11 years, 209 days	1987	First Lord of the Treasury; Minister for the Civil Service	Conservative	Thatcher III	Elizabeth II r. 1952–2022
photograph	John Major: MP for Huntingdon; (born 1943); Premiership	28 November 1990	2 May 1997	6 years, 156 days	—	First Lord of the Treasury; Minister for the Civil Service	Conservative	Major I	Elizabeth II r. 1952–2022
photograph	John Major: MP for Huntingdon; (born 1943); Premiership	28 November 1990	2 May 1997	6 years, 156 days	1992	First Lord of the Treasury; Minister for the Civil Service	Conservative	Major II	Elizabeth II r. 1952–2022
photograph	Tony Blair: MP for Sedgefield; (born 1953); Premiership	2 May 1997	27 June 2007	10 years, 57 days	1997	First Lord of the Treasury; Minister for the Civil Service	Labour	Blair I	Elizabeth II r. 1952–2022
photograph	Tony Blair: MP for Sedgefield; (born 1953); Premiership	2 May 1997	27 June 2007	10 years, 57 days	2001	First Lord of the Treasury; Minister for the Civil Service	Labour	Blair II	Elizabeth II r. 1952–2022
photograph	Tony Blair: MP for Sedgefield; (born 1953); Premiership	2 May 1997	27 June 2007	10 years, 57 days	2005	First Lord of the Treasury; Minister for the Civil Service	Labour	Blair III	Elizabeth II r. 1952–2022
photograph	Gordon Brown: MP for Kirkcaldy and Cowdenbeath; (born 1951); Premiership	27 June 2007	11 May 2010	2 years, 319 days	—	First Lord of the Treasury; Minister for the Civil Service	Labour	Brown	Elizabeth II r. 1952–2022
photograph	David Cameron: MP for Witney; (born 1966); Premiership	11 May 2010	13 July 2016	6 years, 64 days	(2010)	First Lord of the Treasury; Minister for the Civil Service	Conservative	Cameron–Clegg (Con–Lib.Dem)	Elizabeth II r. 1952–2022
photograph	David Cameron: MP for Witney; (born 1966); Premiership	11 May 2010	13 July 2016	6 years, 64 days	2015	First Lord of the Treasury; Minister for the Civil Service	Conservative	Cameron II	Elizabeth II r. 1952–2022
photograph	Theresa May: MP for Maidenhead; (born 1956); Premiership	13 July 2016	24 July 2019	3 years, 12 days	—	First Lord of the Treasury; Minister for the Civil Service	Conservative	May I	Elizabeth II r. 1952–2022
photograph	Theresa May: MP for Maidenhead; (born 1956); Premiership	13 July 2016	24 July 2019	3 years, 12 days	(2017)	First Lord of the Treasury; Minister for the Civil Service	Conservative	May II (DUP confidence & supply)	Elizabeth II r. 1952–2022
photograph	Boris Johnson: MP for Uxbridge and South Ruislip; (born 1964); Premiership	24 July 2019	6 September 2022	3 years, 45 days	(—)	First Lord of the Treasury; Minister for the Civil Service; Minister for the Union	Conservative	Johnson I (DUP confidence & supply)	Elizabeth II r. 1952–2022
photograph	Boris Johnson: MP for Uxbridge and South Ruislip; (born 1964); Premiership	24 July 2019	6 September 2022	3 years, 45 days	2019	First Lord of the Treasury; Minister for the Civil Service; Minister for the Union	Conservative	Johnson II	Elizabeth II r. 1952–2022
photograph	Liz Truss: MP for South West Norfolk; (born 1975); Premiership	6 September 2022	25 October 2022	50 days	—	First Lord of the Treasury; Minister for the Civil Service; Minister for the Union	Conservative	Truss	Elizabeth II r. 1952–2022
photograph	Liz Truss: MP for South West Norfolk; (born 1975); Premiership	6 September 2022	25 October 2022	50 days	—	First Lord of the Treasury; Minister for the Civil Service; Minister for the Union	Conservative	Truss	Charles III r. 2022–present
photograph	Rishi Sunak: MP for Richmond (Yorks); (born 1980); Premiership	25 October 2022	5 July 2024	1 year, 255 days	—	First Lord of the Treasury; Minister for the Civil Service; Minister for the Union	Conservative	Sunak	Charles III r. 2022–present
photograph	Keir Starmer: MP for Holborn and St Pancras; (born 1962); Premiership	5 July 2024	20 July 2026	2 years, 16 days	2024	First Lord of the Treasury; Minister for the Civil Service; Minister for the Union	Labour	Starmer	Charles III r. 2022–present
photograph	Andy Burnham: MP for Makerfield; (born 1970); Premiership	20 July 2026	Incumbent	125 days	—	First Lord of the Treasury; Minister for the Civil Service; Minister for the Union	Labour (Lab Co-op)	Burnham	Charles III r. 2022–present

== Disputed prime ministers ==
Because of the gradual evolution of the post of prime minister, the title is applied to early prime ministers only retrospectively. This has sometimes given rise to academic dispute. William Pulteney, 1st Earl of Bath, and James Waldegrave, 2nd Earl Waldegrave, are sometimes listed as prime ministers. Bath was invited to form a ministry by George II when Henry Pelham resigned in 1746, as was Waldegrave in 1757 after the dismissal of William Pitt the Elder, who dominated the affairs of government during the Seven Years' War. Neither was able to command sufficient parliamentary support to form a government. Bath stepped down after two days and Waldegrave after four. Modern academic consensus does not consider either man to have held office as prime minister. They are therefore listed separately.

- Whig (2)

List of disputed prime ministers of the United Kingdom since 1721
Portrait	Prime minister Office (lifespan)	Term of office			Mandate	Ministerial offices held as prime minister	Party	Government	Monarch Reign
Portrait	Prime minister Office (lifespan)	Start	End	Duration	Mandate	Ministerial offices held as prime minister	Party	Government	Monarch Reign
William Pulteney	William Pulteney: 1st Earl of Bath; (1684–1764)	10 February 1746	12 February 1746	3 days	–	First Lord of the Treasury	Whig	Short-lived	George II r. 1727–1760
James Waldegrave, 2nd Earl Waldegrave	James Waldegrave: 2nd Earl Waldegrave; (1715–1763)	8 June 1757	12 June 1757	5 days	–	First Lord of the Treasury	Whig	Waldegrave	George II r. 1727–1760

== Timeline ==
Source: UK Government

== See also ==
- Category:British premierships
- List of prime ministers of the United Kingdom by length of tenure
- List of prime ministers of the United Kingdom by education
- Assassination of Spencer Perceval
- Downing Street
  - 10 Downing Street
- List of British governments
- List of current heads of government in the United Kingdom and dependencies
- List of prime ministers of Queen Victoria (for the United Kingdom of Great Britain and Ireland and the British Empire)
- Deputy Prime Minister of the United Kingdom
- List of United Kingdom general elections
- Royal prerogative in the United Kingdom
- List of government ministers of the United Kingdom
