= Premierships of William Ewart Gladstone =

Period of the Government of the United Kingdom during the late 19th century

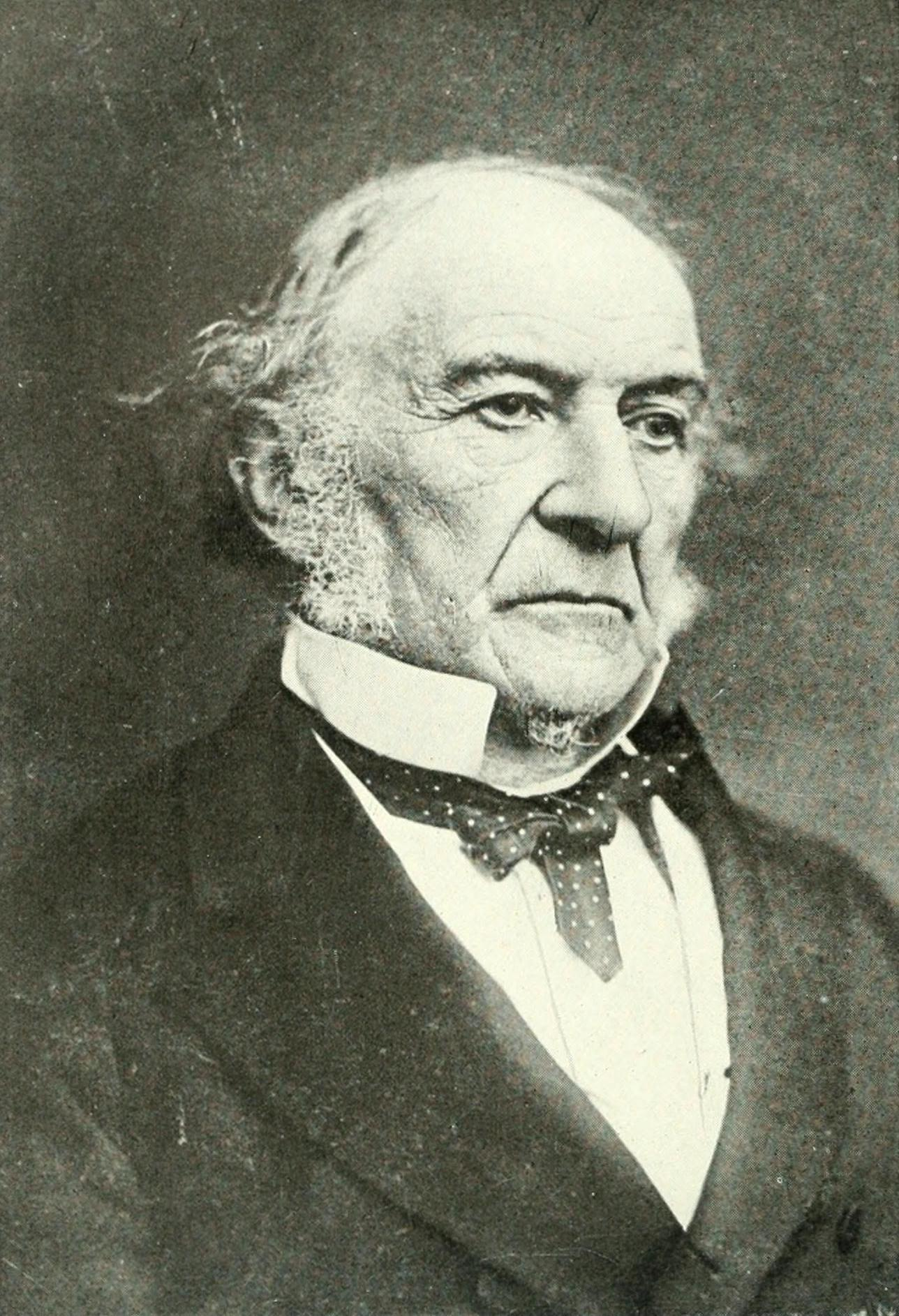
- Premierships of William Ewart Gladstone
- Monarch: Victoria
- Prime Minister: William Ewart Gladstone
- Party: Liberal
- Seat: 10 Downing Street
- First term 3 December 1868 – 17 February 1874
- Cabinet: First Gladstone ministry
- Election: 1868
- Second term 23 April 1880 – 9 June 1885
- Cabinet: Second Gladstone ministry
- Election: 1880
- Third term 1 February 1886 – 20 July 1886
- Cabinet: Third Gladstone ministry
- Election: 1885
- Fourth term 15 August 1892 – 2 March 1894
- Cabinet: Fourth Gladstone ministry
- Election: 1892
- Coat of arms of HM Government

William Ewart Gladstone was the Liberal prime minister of the United Kingdom of Great Britain and Ireland on four occasions between 1868 and 1894. He was noted for his moralistic leadership and his emphasis on world peace, economical budgets, political reform and efforts to resolve the Irish question. Gladstone saw himself as a national leader driven by a political and almost religious mission, which he tried to validate through elections and dramatic appeals to the public conscience. His approach sometimes divided the Liberal Party, which he dominated for three decades. Finally Gladstone split his party on the issue of Irish Home Rule, which he saw as mandated by the true public interest regardless of the political cost.

== First government (1868–1874) ==
During the Christmas of 1867 The Earl Russell announced that he would not lead the Liberal Party at the next general election and so Gladstone succeeded him as Liberal Party leader. The resulting general election of 1868 (the first under the extended franchise enacted in the Reform Act 1867) returned a Liberal majority of 112 seats in the House of Commons.

As prime minister 1868 to 1874 Gladstone headed a Liberal Party that was a coalition of Peelites like himself, Whigs and radicals; Gladstone was now a spokesman for "peace, economy and reform."

Between 1870 and 1874 religious disputes played a major part in destroying the broad Liberal Party coalition. Disputes over education, Irish disestablishment, and the Irish universities showed the divergence between, on the one hand, Whigs, who wanted state control of education and the propagation of a nondenominational, morally uplifting Christianity, and on the other hand Gladstone and his supporters, who sought to guard religion's independence from a modernising civil power. This division struck a lasting blow to prospects of agreement on future policy over education and Ireland.

=== Major legislation ===
The first major reform Gladstone undertook was the disestablishment of the Church of Ireland as embodied in the Irish Church Act 1869. This was followed by the Landlord and Tenant (Ireland) Act 1870 which attempted to protect Irish tenants from unfair treatment from landlords by lending public money to tenants to enable them to buy their holdings. The act limited landlords' powers to arbitrarily evict their tenants and established compensation for eviction, which varied according to the size of holdings and was not eligible for those evicted for failing to pay rents.

Gladstone's government also passed the Elementary Education Act 1870 (33 & 34 Vict. c. 75), which provided England with an adequate system of elementary schools for the first time. It established a system of elective school boards which were founded to provide education where there were no voluntary schools. These boards had the power to levy rates and from which construct schools, employ teachers, and the ability to force children to attend (if they thought fit) those who were receiving no other education. They were also able to pay certain children's fees for voluntary schools.

In 1871 Gladstone's government passed the Trade Union Act 1871 making membership of trade unions legal for the first time. However, picketing remained illegal, with the Criminal Law Amendment Act 1871 making it a specific criminal offence punishable by three months' hard labour in prison. The Ballot Act 1872 was also passed, which established secret ballots for general and local elections.

The Licensing Act 1872 restricted the opening hours in public houses; regulated the content of beer; gave local authorities the power to determine licensing hours and gave boroughs the option of banning all alcohol. These policies were enforced by the police. This act was generally unpopular and led to rioting in some towns. The liquor industry had Liberal leanings before the act but now this totally changed, and from "midsummer 1871 [when the first Licensing Bill was discussed] till the dissolution of 1874 nearly every public-house in the United Kingdom was an active committee-room for the Conservative Party". Gladstone blamed the act for the Conservative victory in the 1874 general election, writing: "We have been borne down in a torrent of gin and beer".

The Supreme Court of Judicature Act 1873 remodelled the English court system (establishing the High Court of Justice and the Court of Appeal). It also attempted to remove the House of Lords's role as a judicial body for England, but this provision was not implemented due to the Conservative victory of 1874.

As Gladstone's Secretary of State for War, Edward Cardwell enacted far-reaching reforms of the British Army in what would become known as the Cardwell Reforms.

==== Finance ====
In 1868 Gladstone appointed Robert Lowe (1811–92) Chancellor of the Exchequer, expecting him to hold down public spending. Public spending rose, and Gladstone pronounced Lowe "wretchedly deficient." Maloney notes that historians concur on that. Lowe systematically underestimated revenue, enabling him to resist the clamour for tax cuts, and to reduce the national debt instead. He insisted that the tax system be fair to all classes. By his own criterion of fairness—that the balance between direct and indirect taxation remain unchanged—he succeeded. Historians point out that this balance had never been a good measure of class incidence and was by that time thoroughly archaic.

Public expenditure on the military and the navy by 1871 was at its lowest level since 1858. Overall, national public expenditure was reduced from £71,000,000 in 1868 to £67,000,000 in 1870 and 1871. However, it rose to £74,604,000 in 1874. Nevertheless, Gladstone was able to produce five surpluses for each year amounting to £17,000,000. He was also able (he resumed the office of Chancellor of the Exchequer in August 1873 till the dissolution of Parliament in early 1874) to reduce the income tax to 3 pence in the pound in 1873, and the next year proposed to abolish it altogether if he won the next general election.

=== Foreign policy ===
In the aftermath of the Franco-Prussian War of 1870–71 Gladstone attempted to persuade the German Chancellor Otto von Bismarck to forbear from annexing Alsace and Lorraine from defeated France. Gladstone published an anonymous article in the Edinburgh Review in October 1870 espousing his views, but it did not remain anonymous for long. The Germans remained unconvinced by Gladstone's overtures, however. France would regain both provinces in 1919 and 1944—but only after two World Wars with Germany.

During the American Civil War (1861-1865), Gladstone as Chancellor of the Exchequer favoured British and French intervention on the side of the Confederacy. His advice was rejected by the Prime Minister and Britain remained uninvolved. However, British firms financed the purchasing of weapons and stored them in blockade runners where they would be smuggled through the Union blockade to the Confederacy in exchange for cotton. The Confederate ship CSS Alabama had been built in an English port and had subsequently damaged Union shipping. In 1872 Gladstone partly settled the Alabama Claims by giving the United States $15,500,000 as part of the Treaty of Washington only on part of damages committed by British-built Confederate raiders.

=== Army reform ===
Gladstone paid little attention to military affairs but in 1870 pushed through Parliament major changes in Army organisation. Germany's stunning triumph over France proved that the Prussian system of professional soldiers with up-to-date weapons was far superior to the traditional system of gentlemen-soldiers that Britain used. The reforms were designed to centralise the power of the War Office, abolish purchase of officers' commissions, and to create reserve forces stationed in Britain by establishing short terms of service for enlisted men.

Edward Cardwell (1813–1886) as Secretary of State for War (1868–1874) designed the reforms that Gladstone supported in the name of efficiency and democracy. In 1868 he abolished flogging, raising the private soldier status to more like an honourable career. In 1870 Cardwell abolished "bounty money" for recruits, discharged known bad characters from the ranks. He pulled 20,000 soldiers out of self-governing colonies, like Canada, which learned they had to help defend themselves. The most radical change, and one that required Gladstone's political muscle, was to abolish the system of officers obtaining commissions and promotions by purchase, rather than by merit. The system meant that the rich landholding families controlled all the middle and senior ranks in the army. Promotion depended on the family's wealth, not the officer's talents, and the middle class was shut out almost completely. British officers were expected to be gentlemen and sportsmen; there was no problem if they were entirely wanting in military knowledge or leadership skills. From the Tory perspective it was essential to keep the officer corps the domain of gentlemen, and not a trade for professional experts. They warned the latter might menace the oligarchy and threaten a military coup; they preferred an inefficient army to an authoritarian state. The rise of Bismarck's new Germany made this reactionary policy too dangerous for a great empire to risk. The bill, which would have compensated current owners for their cash investments, passed Commons in 1871 but was blocked by the House of Lords. Gladstone then moved to drop the system without any reimbursements, forcing the Lords to backtrack and approve the original bill. Liberals rallied to Gladstone's anti-elitism, pointing to the case of Lord Cardigan (1797–1868), who spent £40,000 for his commission and proved utterly incompetent in the Crimean war, where he ordered the disastrous "Charge of the Light Brigade" in 1854. Cardwell was not powerful enough to install a general staff system; that had to await the 20th century. He did rearrange the war department. He made the office of Secretary of State for War superior to the Army's commander in Chief; the commander was His Royal Highness The Duke of Cambridge (1819–1904), the Queen's first cousin, and an opponent of the reforms. The surveyor-general of the ordnance, and the financial secretary became key department heads reporting to the Secretary. The militia was reformed as well and integrated into the Army. The term of enlistment was reduced to 6 years, so there was more turnover and a larger pool of trained reservists. The territorial system of recruiting for regiments was standardised and adjusted to the current population. Cardwell reduced the Army budget yet increased its strength of the army by 25 battalions, 156 field guns, and abundant stores, while the reserves available for foreign service had been raised tenfold from 3,500 to 36,000 men.

== Second government (1880–1885) ==
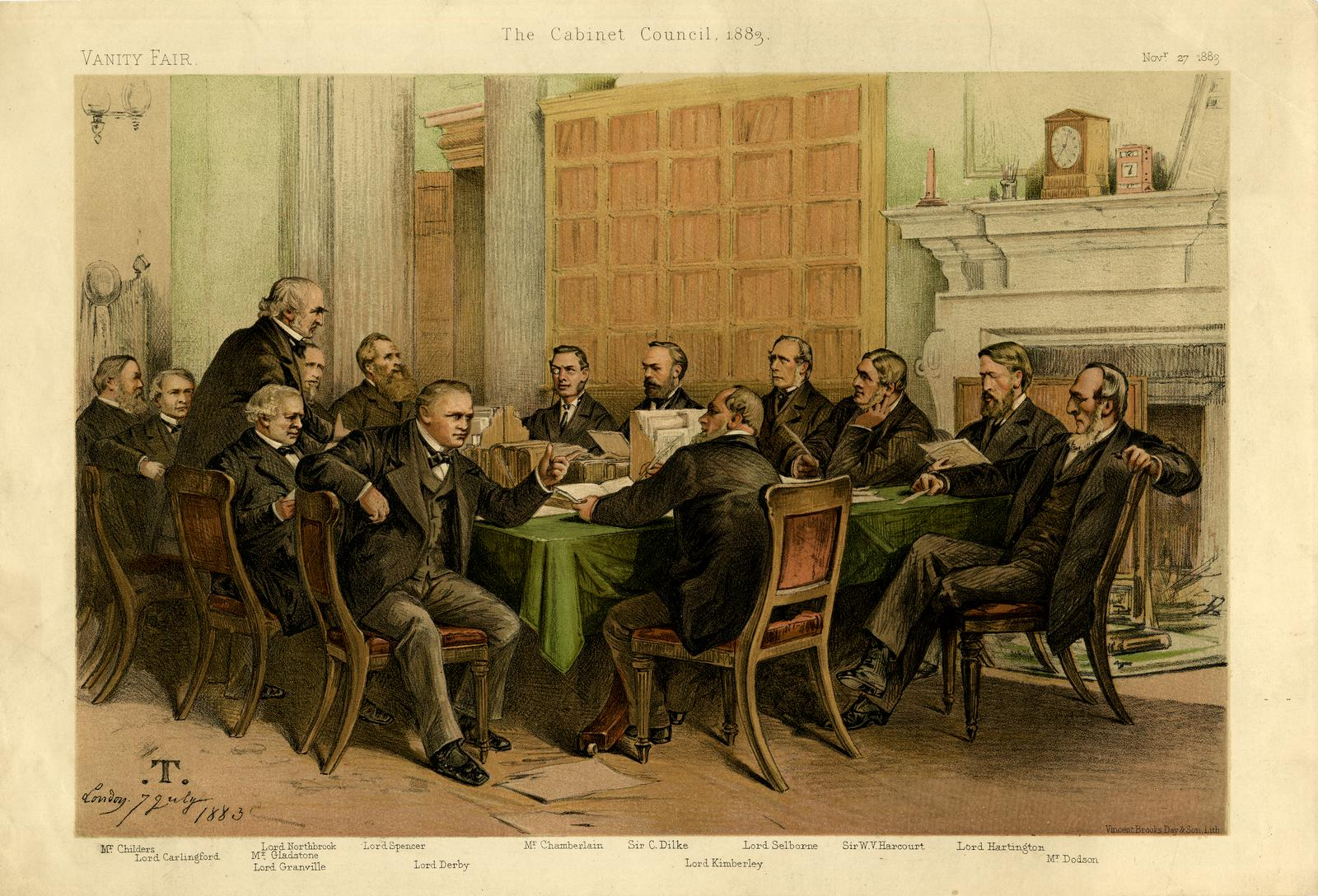
The Cabinet Council, 1883 by Théobald Chartran, published in Vanity Fair, 27 November 1883

In the 1880 general election Gladstone's Liberals won 352 seats, a gain of 110, against 237 for the Conservatives and 63 for the Irish Home Rule League. It was a comfortable margin, but defections always seemed to whittle down the lead and sometimes produced defeat. Despite his age Gladstone was an indefatigable leader and organiser, and the most brilliant speaker; however he wasted energy by serving as his own Chancellor of the Exchequer for a while. His Liberal party was increasingly factionalised between the smaller "radical" contingent and the larger "Whig" grouping. Gladstone selected a relatively weak cabinet that favoured the Whigs. Even so, some Whigs were alienated because of his imperial policy, while the radical leader, Joseph Chamberlain broke away in because they opposed his home rule plan for Ireland.

It has been argued that Gladstone mishandled the Bradlaugh affair, giving the opposition a religious cudgel which they used for years, with the result that his second ministry was not nearly as successful as the first.

=== Major legislation ===
One of the first major pieces of legislation introduced by the new government was the Elementary Education Act 1880, which enshrined the principle of compulsory education (for all children aged 5–10 years of age) into law for the first time.

In 1881 Gladstone was convinced that to pass a Land Bill for Ireland, law and order should be restored. In February 1881 the government therefore passed the Peace Preservation (Ireland) Act 1881 (44 & 45 Vict. c. 5) which gave the Viceroy of Ireland powers to suspend habeas corpus, and gave him in effect the power to lock up anyone he liked for as long as he liked. This was the act used to arrest Irish Nationalist leader Charles Stewart Parnell. In August that year Parliament passed the Land Law (Ireland) Act 1881 which gave Irish tenants "the three Fs"; fair rent, fixity (security) of tenure; and the right to freely sell their holdings. Gladstone's government also passed the Arrears of Rent (Ireland) Act 1882, which cancelled rent arrears for Irish tenants occupying land worth less than £30 per annum who were unable to pay.

The Employers' Liability Act 1880 restricted the doctrine of common employment while also allowing workmen (according to one study) “to avail themselves of; a special county court procedure for the recovery of their rights.” The Married Women's Property Act 1882 gave married women the same rights to buy, sell, and own property as unmarried women did and had the effect of women being legally recognised as individuals in their own right for the first time in history.

The Merchant Seamen (Payment of Wages and Rating) Act 1880 a law was introduced which forbade conditional advance notes in payment of sailors’ wages, together with the Merchant Shipping (Carriage of Grain) Act 1880 dictating certain arrangements for the safe carriage of grain-cargoes. Legislation introduced in 1881, the Sea Fisheries (Clam and Bait Beds) Act 1881 sought to prevent trawling over clam-beds and bait-beds. The following year, the Board of Trade was authorized by the Electric Lighting Act 1882 to grant licences to generate and sell electricity, and (as noted by one study) "municipal bodies were enabled to levy rates for electric-lighting." Additional exactions from ratepayers were authorized by the Baths and Wash Houses Act 1882 as a means of facilitating access to washhouses and baths, while local authorities were empowered by the Public Health (Fruit Pickers Lodgings) Act 1882, as noted by one observer, “to make bye-laws for securing the decent lodging of persons engaged in picking fruit and vegetables.” The Cheap Trains Act 1883 lowered the cost of travelling for workmen, with the Board of Trade empowered to ensure that there was sufficiently good and frequent accommodation available. Other acts forbade wages being paid to workmen at or within public-houses and provided for the inspection of white lead works and bake-houses; with times of employment regulated in both.

The Artizans Dwellings Act 1882 (45 & 46 Vict. c. 54) authorised local authorities (as noted by one study) “to order the demolition of buildings which obstructed other premises by stopping ventilation or otherwise.” The Bankruptcy Act 1883 provided (as noted by one journal) “against seizure of tools for small debts” while the Merchant Shipping (Fishing Boats) Act 1883 included safeguards for apprentices in the sea-fishing service. In 1884, a royal commission was appointed to study working-class housing conditions.

Gladstone's second government also saw a number of electoral reforms. The Corrupt and Illegal Practices Prevention Act 1883 aimed at eliminating corruption in elections and the Representation of the People Act 1884, which gave the counties the same franchise as the boroughs—adult male householders and £10 lodgers—and added about six million to the total number who could vote in parliamentary elections. Parliamentary reform continued with the Redistribution of Seats Act 1885.

Public expenditure was reduced to slightly under £81,000,000 in 1881 from the £83,000,000 inherited from the previous administration of 1879. However it rose to £89,000,000 in 1885. For nearly three years into his second government Gladstone resumed the office of Chancellor. He abolished the tax on malt for the farmers, funding this by adding one pence on income tax and introducing a duty on beer, in 1880. In 1881 he reduced the income tax to five pence in the pound, funding this by increasing the duty on spirits, probates and legacies. In his last Budget in 1882 Gladstone added to the income tax.

Gladstone's government was unexpectedly defeated on the Budget vote on 8 June 1885 and therefore Gladstone resigned the premiership the next day, with Lord Salisbury forming a minority Conservative administration.

=== Foreign policy ===
While in opposition Gladstone spoke out against Disraeli's aggressive imperialism. Especially in his Midlothian campaign speeches of 1880 he had expounded on his Liberal philosophy of government. The major concern of the campaign was with foreign affairs; with evangelical fervour he articulated his vision of a world community, governed by law, and protecting the weak. The basis was universalism and inclusiveness; his emotional appeals reached to the sense of concern for others, rising eventually to the larger picture of the unity of mankind. Gladstone intended to restore right conduct and right principles when he returned to office, but public opinion—especially among the rural gentry—forced his government to continue imperial defence and expansion, most notably in Egypt. At a time when France, Germany and others were rapidly expanding their empires, he opposed expanding the British Empire.

Gladstone won the 1880 election on the back of his Midlothian campaign against Disraeli's support for the Ottoman Empire. He proceeded to reverse Disraeli's foreign policy by withdrawing the British garrison in Kandahar in Afghanistan and wanted to cede Cyprus to Greece, although he was dissuaded from this by Lord Granville. Although he had denounced the annexation of the Transvaal in the election campaign, he announced in January 1881 that self-government was not going to happen. The Boers rebelled against this in February and drove the British out by force at the Battle of Majuba Hill. Gladstone implemented the Pretoria Convention later in August which ended the First Boer War. In October in a speech at Leeds, Gladstone proclaimed: "While we are opposed to imperialism, we are devoted to the empire".

However, in 1882 a nationalist revolt occurred in Egypt, headed by Colonel Urabi. There was a perceived danger to the Suez Canal, and therefore British communications with its to Indian empire, as well as to British holders of Egyptian bonds. At first, Gladstone appealed to the Concert of Europe to take collective action, although this was met by unenthusiastic responses. France initially sent warships to join the Royal Navy at Alexandria, but refused to send military forces in fear of weakening its defences against Germany. On 10 July Gladstone instructed that an ultimatum be given to Urabi to halt military fortifications of Alexandria within twelve hours. Urabi did not answer and so on 11 July the Royal Navy bombarded the city while the French withdrew. This resulted in rioting and Gladstone got from Parliament £2,300,000 and raised the income tax from 5d. to 6½d. to finance a military campaign. The decision to go to war met with opposition from within the Liberal Party, and the Radical MP John Bright resigned from the Cabinet in protest. On 19 August British troops commanded by Sir Garnet Wolseley landed at Port Said and on 13 September defeated Urabi's forces at the Battle of Tel-el-Kebir. On hearing news of the British victory Gladstone was ecstatic and ordered salutes of the guns in Hyde Park in their honour.

In January 1884 Gladstone consented to sending General Gordon to the Sudan to report on the best means of evacuating Egyptian garrisons there in the aftermath of the Mahdi Muhammad Ahmad's rebellion. When Gordon arrived in the Sudan he wanted to hold the capital, Khartoum. At first Gladstone refused to send a relief expedition but a few months later he consented and in October 1884 General Wolseley embarked from Cairo to Khartoum but arrived there too late to save Gordon, who had died when Khartoum fell to the Mahdi. "No single event in Gladstone's career made him more unpopular" and a vote of censure in the Commons reduced the government's majority to fourteen.

=== Religious issues ===
Enormous publicity was accorded the case of Charles Bradlaugh, who was elected as a Liberal to Parliament again and again but could not be seated because he was an atheist. Bradlaugh was a conventional Liberal on most issues, but he was also a highly controversial proponent of birth control. The technical issue was whether an atheist could "affirm" his loyalty rather than "swear to God." Gladstone fought to get Bradlaugh seated, but took a legalistic approach which allowed the Conservatives to attack the Liberals with an appeal to religious sentiment. The Liberals were split and their cause suffered. Bradlaugh was finally seated in 1886 and in 1888 Parliament passed a law that allowed affirmations instead of oaths.

With very little publicity Gladstone after 1880 was increasingly estranged from Queen Victoria on issues of Church of England patronage. Gladstone's policy was to nominate bishops and deans solely on the basis of merit and leadership ability. The Queen, encouraged by Disraeli, favoured moderates who would restrain the High Church party (which tended to support the Liberals).

== Third government (1886) ==
The general election in November/December 1885 saw the Liberals lose 33 seats but in January 1886 Salisbury resigned the premiership after losing a vote in the Commons and so Gladstone formed a government on 1 February. Historians point to his age as an explanation for his inflexibility. He minimized the Radical role in his cabinet, with only Joseph Chamberlain representing that faction. The result was internal feuding that so weakened the cabinet that solid achievements were lacking. The historian Donald Southgate argues:

Gladstone, age and ailing, had lost his effectiveness....The party was suffering because the desire to preserve it took precedence, even with the leading Radicals, over the desire to employ it for any particular purpose, such as the grant of local representative institutions to Ireland.

The historian Robert Ensor wrote:

Never in the modern era has a triumphant House of Commons majority achieved so little....The reason was not merely the continuing economic unrest outside, nor the new phenomena of two oppositions—an Irish as well as a conservative. It was that... there persisted a hidden [conflict] within the majority itself, which palsied the government's consuls and zigzagged its policy.... His own method of adjustment, which was to be radical in the open and whiggish behind the scenes, allowed neither side to feel secure. Now, too, that he was past 70, mere egotism grew on him; and within a habit of playing this mystery—man and puzzling his followers by unexpected moves.

Gladstone turned to Ireland. The First Home Rule Bill was introduced to Parliament on 8 April and the Land Purchase Bill on 16 April. Joseph Chamberlain and George Otto Trevelyan resigned from the Cabinet when Gladstone told them that he intended to introduce the bills.

The Land Purchase Bill enabled landlords in Ireland—mostly Protestants—to sell their land to their tenants for the price of 20 years' rent. The purchases were to be financed by government loans funded by £120,000,000 secured on British credit at 3%. The bill was a shock to Liberals and brought down Gladstone's government in a matter of months. Irish nationalist reaction was mixed, Unionist opinion was hostile, and the election addresses during the 1886 election revealed English radicals to be against the bill also. Among the Liberal rank and file, several Gladstonian candidates disowned the bill, reflecting fears at the constituency level that the interests of the working people were being sacrificed to finance a rescue operation for the landed elite. The Land Purchase Bill was criticised from all sides and was dropped. The Home Rule Bill was defeated by 343 votes to 313, with 93 Liberals voting against. Thus nothing was accomplished except the permanent disruption of the Liberal Party.

Men who left the Liberal Party now formed the Liberal Unionist Party. Gladstone dissolved Parliament and called a general election which resulted in a Unionist (Conservative and Liberal Unionist) landslide victory under Salisbury.

== Fourth government (1892–1894) ==
The general election of 1892 returned more Liberals than Unionists but without an overall majority. The Unionists stayed in office until they lost a motion of no confidence moved by H. H. Asquith on 11 August. Gladstone became Prime Minister for the last time at the age of 82, and was both the oldest ever person to be appointed to the office and when he resigned in 1894 aged 84 he was the oldest person ever to occupy the Premiership.

Gladstone was the first Prime Minister to make it a condition of ministers to resign directorships of public companies in 1892. This was abandoned by Salisbury in 1895 and Arthur Balfour after him but was restored by Liberal Henry Campbell-Bannerman in 1905 and was observed ever since.

Having to rely on Irish Nationalist votes, Gladstone introduced the Second Home Rule Bill in February 1893, passing second reading on 21 April by 43 votes and third reading on 1 September by 34 votes. However the House of Lords killed the Bill by voting against by 419 votes to 41 on 8 September. Gladstone wanted to call a general election to campaign against the Lords but his colleagues dissuaded him from doing so.

Public expenditure in the years 1892–93 was £80,000,000 with income tax at seven pence in the pound. In 1894 Britain's imports totalled £408,000,000, with total British-made exports at £216,000,000 (and the re-export of imports valued at £57,000,000).

In December 1893 an Opposition motion proposed by Lord George Hamilton called for an expansion of the Royal Navy. Gladstone opposed increasing public expenditure on the naval estimates, in the tradition of free trade liberalism of his earlier political career as Chancellor. Almost all his colleagues, however, believed in some expansion of the Royal Navy. Gladstone also opposed Sir William Harcourt's proposal to implement a graduated death duty, which Gladstone denounced as "the most radical measure of my lifetime".

Gladstone decided to resign the Premiership, ostensibly on health grounds, on 2 March 1894. The Queen did not ask Gladstone who should succeed him but sent for Lord Rosebery (Gladstone would have advised on Lord Spencer).

== Notes ==
British premierships
Preceded by Disraeli	1st Gladstone premiership 1868–1874	Succeeded by Disraeli
Preceded by Disraeli	2nd Gladstone premiership 1880–1885	Succeeded by Salisbury
Preceded by Salisbury	3rd Gladstone premiership 1886	Succeeded by Salisbury
Preceded by Salisbury	4th Gladstone premiership 1892–1894	Succeeded by Rosebery
