= Premierships of Benjamin Disraeli =

Periods of Government of the United Kingdom in 1868 and 1874 to 1880

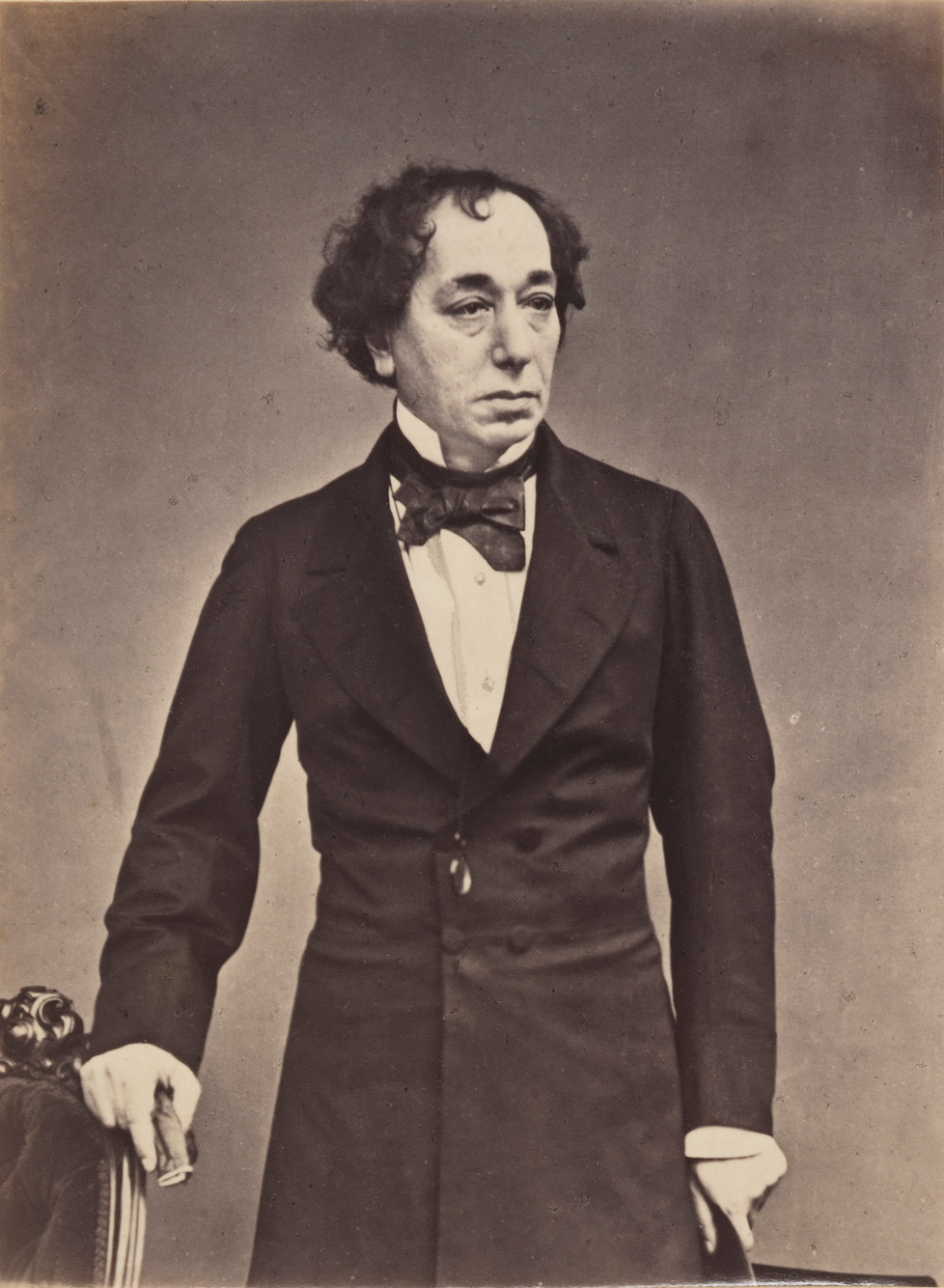
- Premierships of Benjamin Disraeli
- Monarch: Victoria
- Prime Minister: The Earl of Beaconsfield
- Party: Conservative
- Seat: 10 Downing Street
- First term 27 February 1868 – 1 December 1868
- Cabinet: Third Derby–Disraeli ministry
- Second term 20 February 1874 – 21 April 1880
- Cabinet: Second Disraeli ministry
- Election: 1874
- Coat of arms of HM Government

Benjamin Disraeli's tenure as prime minister of the United Kingdom of Great Britain and Ireland began when Queen Victoria first invited him to form a government in 1864. He was then the Conservative prime minister on two occasions, first in 1868 and then between 1874 and 1880.

== First government (1868) ==
In February 1868 the Prime Minister, The Earl of Derby, received medical advice which told him that he could not fully recover from his illness whilst Premier. He therefore asked Benjamin Disraeli (who was Chancellor of the Exchequer at the time) if he was ready to be Premier. Disraeli said yes, telling his friends, "I have climbed to the top of the greasy pole". However his political position was weak—a caretaker in the minority.

Disraeli inherited a minority Conservative administration but was able to pass some notable Acts of Parliament. The Public Schools Act 1868 established a board of governors for nine English public schools. The Telegraph Act 1868 gave the Post Office power to nationalise all telegraph companies. The Capital Punishment Amendment Act 1868 abolished public executions. Disraeli also appointed a Royal Commission on the Sanitary Laws chaired by Sir Charles Adderley.

The Parliamentary Elections Act 1868 transferred the power to try to punish electoral irregularities from the partisan Committee of the House of Commons to the impartial tribunal of judges. The judges objected to these new responsibilities imposed on them but their opposition was overcome and electoral irregularities were then tried in a legal tribunal rather than a committee of party politicians.

The main domestic issue was the status of the Anglican Church in Ireland, where it was officially established although enrolling a small minority. It became the main election issue as well.

=== Foreign policy ===
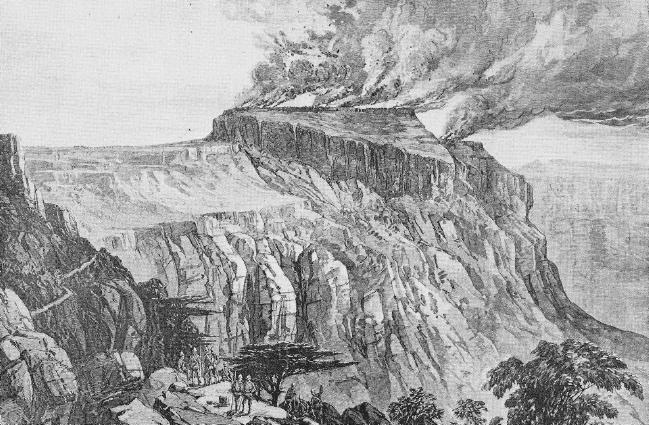
An illustration of the burning of Magdala, an event which took place during the British Expedition to Abyssinia in 1868. The expedition came about as a result of Tewodros II of Ethiopia's imprisonment of European missionaries and officials, and demonstrated the power projection capabilities of the British Empire.

On 26 April news came of the result of Sir Robert Napier's expedition to Abyssinia. Napier had defeated the forces of Theodore II of Abyssinia and released the British prisoners: the British envoy and the British consul. In moving a motion in Parliament thanking Napier and his forces, Disraeli paid to tribute to Napier, who led his army with "the elephants of Asia, bearing the artillery of Europe, over African passes which might have startled the trapper and appalled the hunter of the Alps". He went on to say that Napier's troops "had to scale a mountain fortress, of which the intrinsic strength was such that it may be fairly said it would have been impregnable to the whole world had it been defended by the man by whom it was assailed". Disraeli famously said that "the standard of St. George was hoisted on the mountains of Rasselas".

The cost of the expedition was originally estimated by Disraeli's Chancellor of the Exchequer, George Ward Hunt, to be £5m, raising the income tax from four pence to six pence to fund it. However, in 1869 the Liberal Chancellor had to meet a total of £9m. However Disraeli still defended the expedition, writing to a friend in 1875: "I do not look back to the Abyssinian [war] with regret: quite the reverse. It was a noble feat of arms, and highly raised our prestige in the East...Money is not to be considered in such matters: success alone is to be thought of".

== Second government (1874–1880) ==
The beginning of Disraeli's second premiership coincided with a growing demand for the Ritualistic controversy in the Church of England to be settled by legislation. The Public Worship Regulation Bill passed its first and second readings without a division in the House of Lords and, with amendment, passed its third reading without division. After Gladstone came out against the Bill, Disraeli came out for it, accusing Gladstone of challenging the whole Reformation settlement. Disraeli urged the Bill to be passed in order "to put down Ritualism" and that he was prepared to respect Roman Catholicism practised by Roman Catholics but that he objected to the "Mass in masquerade". The second reading in the House of Commons was passed without division and most clauses of the Bill passed with massive majorities. However the Bill nearly failed to become law when there was a major dispute over the clause which the Archbishops in the Lords had given the Bill: that Bishops should have a veto to prevent "frivolous and irresponsible prosecutions of devoted clergyman". There was in the Commons inserted a clause which gave the right to appeal against this veto to the Archbishop of the Province, which passed with a majority of 23. The High Church party took up the right of a Bishop to uncontrolled rule in his diocese and the Lords dropped their insistence on the appeal to the Archbishop of the Province. Disraeli was worried that the Commons would not pass the Bill without the Archbishop's veto but he managed to persuade the Commons to pass it without the clause by appealing to the need to put down a "small but pernicious sect".

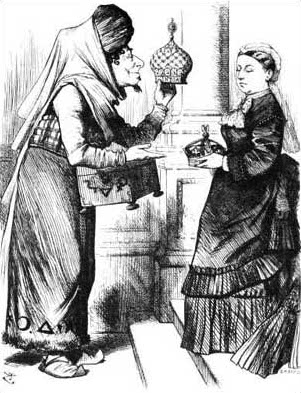
A cartoon that appeared in Punch with the caption: "New crowns for old ones!", showing Queen Victoria exchanging with Disraeli the British Crown for the imperial diadem

Disraeli and the Queen were close, and she wanted an imperial title (her daughter had one in Germany). The Royal Titles Bill, added the title Empress of India to the British monarch's official title. Despite Liberal opposition it passed into law with the assurance that the monarch would only use the Indian title externally; within the United Kingdom the monarch would still be King or Queen rather than Emperor or Empress in ordinary and official usage except when using the "I" after "R" in signature, "Emperor of India" in public proclamations and "Ind. Imp." on the coinage. Disraeli wanted the measure passed to let the world know that Britain would hold onto India: "It is only by the amplification of titles that you can often touch and satisfy the imagination of nations; and that is an element which Governments must not despise".

=== Social reform ===
The Disraeli government's programme of social reform began in the second session of Parliament, 1874–75. This government, chiefly under the influence of the Home Secretary Richard Cross and with the encouragement of Disraeli, addressed "the condition of the people" through major reforms in three areas: housing, savings and labour relations. Disraeli's watchword was "Sanitas sanitatum, omnia sanitas", which the Liberals decried as "a policy of sewage". Disraeli responded that sanitary reform included "most of the civilising influences of humanity".

The housing of the working classes was dealt with by the Artisans' and Labourers' Dwellings Improvement Act 1875 which for the first time gave local councils in large towns power to destroy slum buildings for sanitary reasons and replace them with new ones for artisans. Councils would compensate previous owners for this expropriation and when six years later it was seen that claims for compensation were impeding councils from embarking on housing reform an Amending Act was passed which provided that if overcrowding had created a nuisance, compensation should be given only at the value of the house after the nuisance had been remedied, so that "grasping and callous owners should not profit by their misdeeds". However the Act was criticised by the Radicals who believed in laissez-faire: Henry Fawcett MP scoffed at the Act and asked why Parliament should secure working-class housing and not that of dukes.

The savings of the working classes were secured with the passing of the Friendly Societies Act 1875 (38 & 39 Vict. c. 60). This act allowed friendly societies considerable self-management "but insured the adoption of sound rules, effective audit, and rates of payment sufficient to maintain solvency. It established the friendly societies, and with them the people's savings on a satisfactory basis".

Disraeli's government also passed two Acts which dealt with labour relations: the Employers and Workmen Act 1875 and the Conspiracy and Protection of Property Act 1875 (38 & 39 Vict. c. 86). Previously, a breach of contract by a worker was punished as a criminal act whilst an employer who breached a contract was only liable in a civil court. The Employers and Workmen Act made breaches of contract by a worker a civil offence and therefore made workers and employers equal before the law regarding labour contracts. The Conspiracy and Protection of Property Act amended the law of conspiracy in favour of trade unions and legalised peaceful picketing. Disraeli wrote to a friend that these acts "will gain and retain for the Conservatives the lasting affection of the working classes". The Trade Union Manual of Labour Laws called these two acts "the charter of the social and industrial freedom of the working classes" and in autumn 1875 the Labour Congress and one of the few labour members of Parliament, Alexander Macdonald, formally thanked the government for passing these measures. Macdonald told his constituents in 1879: "The Conservative party have done more for the working classes in five years than the Liberals have in fifty".

The Public Health Act 1875 (38 & 39 Vict. c. 55) consolidated previous measures of public health and the Factory and Workshop Act 1878 consolidated all previous Factory Acts, of which the veteran campaigner for Factory Acts, Lord Shaftesbury, spoke strongly in favour of in the House of Lords. Disraeli's government had previously passed the Factory Act 1874 (37 & 38 Vict. c. 44) which reduced the working day for women and children to ten hours on a weekday and six hours on a Saturday. This was opposed by those Radicals such as Fawcett and 79 Liberals voted against it. The Rivers Pollution Prevention Act 1876 (39 & 40 Vict. c. 75) outlawed the flow of solid matter into rivers and compelled manufacturers to make sure the liquid flowing from their factories into rivers was harmless. This was again opposed by the Radicals such as Sir Charles Dilke.

=== Foreign policy ===
Disraeli and his foreign minister Lord Derby scored a number of achievements. In 1875 came the purchase of the controlling shares in the Suez Canal company. By negotiations, Russia gave up substantial gains in the Balkans and a foothold in the Mediterranean. Britain gains control of Cyprus from the Ottomans as a naval base covering the Eastern Mediterranean. In exchange, Britain guaranteed the Asiatic territories of the Ottoman Empire. Britain did not do well in conflicts in Afghanistan and South Africa.

==== Suez Canal ====
In 1875, the Khedive of Egypt had gone bankrupt and needed to sell shares in the Suez Canal (of whose traffic four-fifths was British) to gain money. Disraeli purchased 176,602 shares, or 44% of the Canal's total. This did not give Britain ownership, but it did give a strong voice and protection against adverse policies. The investment, financed by the Rothschilds, was financially profitable. The market value of the shares rose from £4m in 1875 to £24m in 1898; by 1914 they were worth over £40m. Disraeli acted alone in a matter of hours, without consulting Parliament. The Liberals were opposed but largely kept quiet because the purchase was immensely popular. European governments were highly impressed, and saw it as evidence that Britain had finally abandoned her passivity and was embarking upon a "spirited foreign policy". Some historians have argued that ownership of the canal marked a new policy, that of an extended British commitment in Egypt, together with ensuring the imperial lifeline to India and Australia would not be controlled by France. Geoffrey Hicks replies that the commitment to Egypt was the unintended consequence of a pragmatic policy. Instead, the government's goal for the purchase was quite the opposite: to control the French risk and to otherwise minimize British entanglements in the east.

==== Eastern Question ====
The "Eastern Question" was how the major powers would deal with the military and economic decline of the Ottoman Empire, especially in the face of Russian efforts to break it up and seize the best parts, such as the Straits. Like British leaders before him, Disraeli believed that an integral Ottoman Empire would be barrier to Russian advance in the Mediterranean, a move that was feared as a threat to the British Empire in India. Disraeli wanted to halt possible Russian advance in the Balkans whilst avoiding war. Gladstone and the Liberals were rallying public support by denouncing Turkish atrocities against Christian communities in the Balkans, most notably in Bulgaria in 1876. Disraeli realized that his defense of the Ottomans was politically risky. Nevertheless, in public he robustly declared (in November 1875) that British interests in the East were as important as any other power's. He said in November 1876 that if war were forced on Britain by Russia, Britain "would not terminate till right was done".

When the Russo-Turkish War broke out in 1877 Disraeli's government declared Britain neutral as long as Britain's national interests were respected. These were the security of free communication with the East through the Suez Canal; Egyptian neutrality; and for Russia not to invade Constantinople. The Russian foreign minister, Alexander Mikhailovich Gorchakov, agreed to these proposals. The Ottoman victories under Osman Pasha and Suleiman Pasha roused traditional anti-Russian feeling in Britain. However, when Russia recovered from these setbacks and advanced into Adrianople, Disraeli's government (on 23 January 1878) ordered the Mediterranean fleet of the Royal Navy into the Dardanelles to Constantinople and Parliament voted to raise £6m for military purposes. One week later Russia granted the Ottomans an armistice. However the Foreign Secretary, Lord Derby, and the Colonial Secretary, Lord Carnarvon, resigned in protest (Derby returned when the order to send the fleet was rescinded). When it was rumoured a week later that the Russians were in Constantinople the government sent part of the fleet to the city "for the protection of life and property" and Parliament assented to the £6m without debate. In response the Russians advanced their army and an outbreak of war fever occurred in Britain and a popular music hall song gave rise to the word "jingoism" to describe bellicose patriotism. On 19 February Russia agreed not to occupy Gallipoli and Britain agreed not to land any soldiers in Turkey.

However, when the Russians and the Ottomans signed the Treaty of San Stefano on 3 March, Disraeli's government viewed it as unacceptable due to its Pan-Slavism. Disraeli insisted that any European conference between the great powers must include the possible revision of the treaty. On 27 March Disraeli got the Cabinet's assent to call up the reserves and send to the Mediterranean a large number of Indian soldiers. Lord Derby resigned in reaction to this and was replaced by Lord Salisbury. Salisbury's Circular Note convinced Bismarck to a conference which could discuss the treaty and the Congress of Berlin met from 13 June to 13 July 1878. It included the heads of government of the great powers of Europe to discuss the "Eastern Question". The British plenipotentiaries were Disraeli, Salisbury and Lord Odo Russell.

From the start Disraeli was "the lion of the Congress" and the centre of attention. He made his opening address to the Congress in English rather than French, which caused a sensation and offended the Russians. Disraeli achieved his goals regarding Bulgaria by intimating that he would leave the Congress if his demands were not met, and Russia gave way. During the Congress the Cyprus Convention (which ceded Cyprus to Britain from the Ottoman Empire in return for a defensive alliance) was announced: "a sensational stroke" which brought the plenipotentiaries attention back to Disraeli. At the end the plenipotentiaries signed the Treaty of Berlin.

When the British plenipotentiaries arrived back in England on 16 July they were met with popular acclaim. From Charing Cross to Downing Street there was an immense crowd singing patriotic songs. After arriving at Downing Street, Disraeli appeared at the window and declared that they had brought back from Berlin "Peace with Honour". In his speech to the House of Lords, Disraeli asserted that through the Congress and the Cyprus Convention the threat to the British Empire was averted and that the threat to European independence in the Treaty of San Stefano had been eliminated. The Cyprus Convention was necessary to protect Britain's route to India: "In taking Cyprus the movement is not Mediterranean, it is Indian". After Gladstone had denounced the Convention as adding to Britain's responsibilities and that it was an "insane convent" Disraeli, in a speech given on 27 July, defended it by claiming that a renewed Russia in "ten, fifteen, it might be twenty years" could invade the Ottoman Empire and march towards Constantinople. Disraeli claimed any party in power in Britain at that moment would wish to prevent Russian conquest of Asia Minor and that therefore the Convention was not adding to Britain's responsibilities but that the responsibility was already there. Disraeli then asked who would enter an insane convention: English gentlemen "honoured by the favour of their Sovereign and the confidence of their fellow-subjects" or "a sophistical rhetorician, inebriated with the exuberance of his own verbosity, and gifted with an egotistical imagination that can at all times command an interminable and inconsistent series of arguments to malign an opponent and to glorify himself?" The House of Commons endorsed the Treaty with a majority of 143; it passed without division in the House of Lords. Disraeli's biographer Robert Blake has concluded:

Judged by the criteria of tactical skill and achievement of objectives, Disraeli's foreign policy was an undoubted success. As for the Berlin settlement, of course it was not perfect. No treaty ever is. But it was followed by almost as long a period of peace between the European great powers as the interval separating the Crimean War from the Congress of Vienna. As one of the two principal plenipotentiaries at Berlin Disraeli must share with Bismarck some part of the credit.

== Landslide loss in the election of 1880 ==
Disraeli's preoccupation with foreign affairs and his long neglect of domestic issues cost him his prime ministership in the election in 1880. Gladstone vehemently attacked the foreign policy of Disraeli (now known as Lord Beaconsfield) as utterly immoral. Historian Paul Smith paraphrases the rhetorical tone which focused on attacking "Beaconsfieldism" as a:

Sinister system of policy, which not merely involved the country in immoral, vainglorious and expensive external adventures, inimical to peace and to the rights of small peoples, but aimed at nothing less than the subversion of parliamentary government in favour of some simulacrum of the oriental despotism its creator was alleged to admire.

Smith notes that there was indeed some substance to the allegations, but, "Most of this was partisan extravaganza, worthy of its target's own excursions against the Whigs."

Disraeli himself was now the Earl of Beaconsfield in the House of Lords, and custom did not allow peers to campaign. His party was unable to deal effectively with the rhetorical onslaught. Although he had improved the organization of the Conservative Party, Disraeli was firmly based in the rural gentry, and had little contact with or understanding of the urban middle class that was increasingly dominating his party. Besides issues of foreign policy, the even more important thing Conservatives were unable to effectively defend their economic record on the home front. The 1870s coincided with a long term global depression caused by the collapse of the worldwide railway boom of the 1870s which previously had been so profitable to Britain. The stress was growing by the late 1870s: prices fell, profits fell, employment fell, and there was downward pressure on wage rates that cause much hardship among the industrial working class. The free trade system supported by both parties made Britain defenseless against the flood of cheap wheat from North America, which was exacerbated by the worst harvest of the century in Britain in 1879. The party in power, of course, got the blame, and Liberals repeatedly emphasized the growing budget deficit as a measure of bad stewardship. In the election itself, Disraeli's party lost heavily up and down the line, especially in Scotland and Ireland, and in the urban boroughs. His Conservative strength fell from 351 to 238, while the Liberals jump from 250 to 353. Disraeli resigned on 21 April 1880.

== Bibliography ==
- Aldous, Richard. The Lion and the Unicorn: Gladstone vs. Disraeli (2007)
- Blake, Robert. Disraeli (1966), a standard scholarly biography
- Eldridge, C. C. Disraeli and the Rise of a New Imperialism (1996)
- Ensor, R. C. K. England, 1870–1914 (1936), pp 30–65. online
- Feuchtwanger, E. J. Disraeli, Democracy and the Tory party: Conservative leadership and organisation after the second Reform Bill (1968)
- Langer, William L. European Alliances and Alignments, 1871-1890 (2nd ed. 1950).
- Lee, Stephen J. 'Gladstone and Disraeli (2005)
- Leonard, Dick. The Great Rivalry: Gladstone and Disraeli: a Dual Biography (2013)
- Matthew, H.C.G. "Disraeli, Gladstone, and the Politics of Mid-Victorian Budgets". Historical journal (September 1979) 22#3 pp 615–643. doi:10.1017/S0018246X00017015.
- Millman, Richard. Britain and the Eastern question, 1875–1878 (1979)
- Monypenny, William Flavelle and George Earle Buckle, The Life of Benjamin Disraeli, Earl of Beaconsfield. Volume II. 1860–1881 (London: John Murray, 1929), a famous classic; contains vol 5-6 of the original edition Life of Benjamin Disraeli volume 1 1804-1837, Volume 2 1837-1846, Volume 3 1846-1855, Volume 4 1855-1868, Volume 5 1868-1876, Volume 6 1876-1881. Vol 1 to 6 are available free from Google books: vol 5; and vol 6
- Parry, Jonathan. "Disraeli, Benjamin, earl of Beaconsfield (1804–1881)", Oxford Dictionary of National Biography (2004); online edn, May 2011 accessed 23 February 2012 ] doi:10.1093/ref:odnb/7689
- Seton-Watson, R. W. (1935). Disraeli, Gladstone, and the Eastern Question: A Study in Diplomacy and Party Politics. Archived from the original on 14 November 2016 – via Questia.
- Shannon, Richard. The Age of Disraeli, 1868–1881: the rise of Tory democracy (1992) emphasis on developments inside the Conservative Party.
- Swartz, M. The politics of British foreign policy in the era of Disraeli and Gladstone (1985)
- Weintraub, Stanley. Disraeli: A Biography (1993), 736pp; emphasis on personal life

British premierships
Preceded by Derby	1st Disraeli premiership 1868	Succeeded by Gladstone
Preceded by Gladstone	2nd Disraeli premiership 1874–1880	Succeeded by Gladstone
