= Liberal government, 1892–1895 =

Government of Great Britain and Ireland

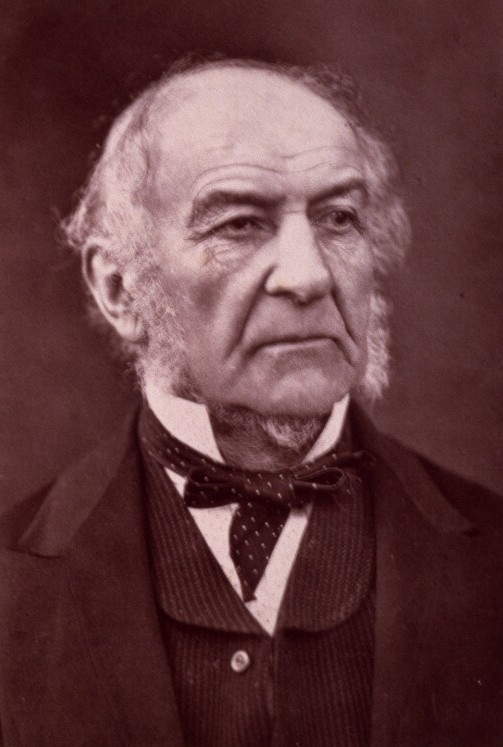
William Ewart Gladstone led the Government from 1892 to 1894 and was succeeded by Lord Rosebery.

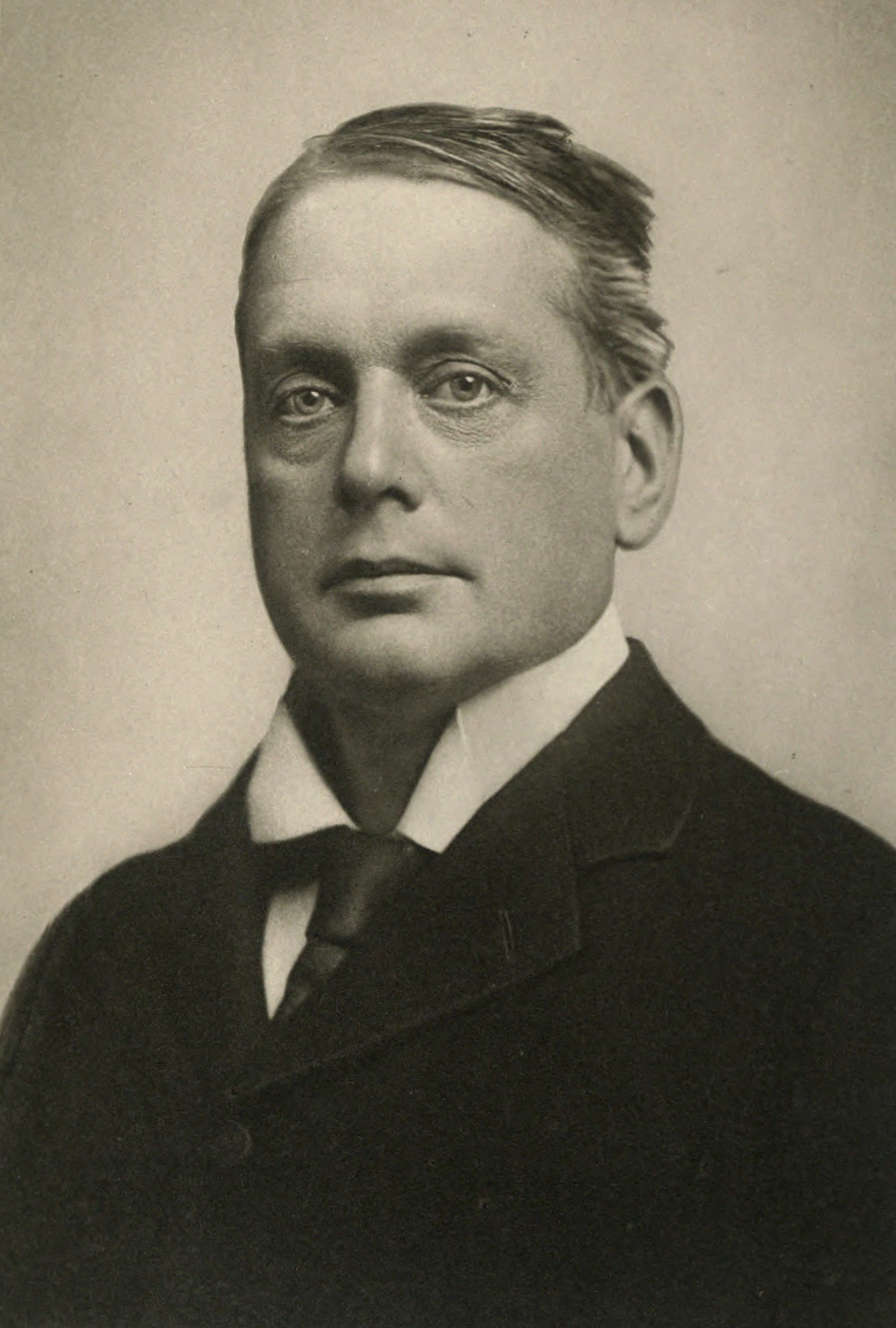
Rosebery led the Government from 1894. He was defeated in the 1895 general election.

In the 1892 general election, the Conservative Party, led by Robert Gascoyne-Cecil, 3rd Marquess of Salisbury, won the most seats but not an overall majority. As a result, William Ewart Gladstone's Liberal Party formed a minority government that relied upon Irish Nationalist support. On 3 March 1894, Gladstone resigned over the rejection of his Home Rule Bill and Archibald Primrose, 5th Earl of Rosebery succeeded him.

== Cabinets ==
=== Fourth Gladstone ministry ===
Fourth Gladstone ministry
- 1892–1894
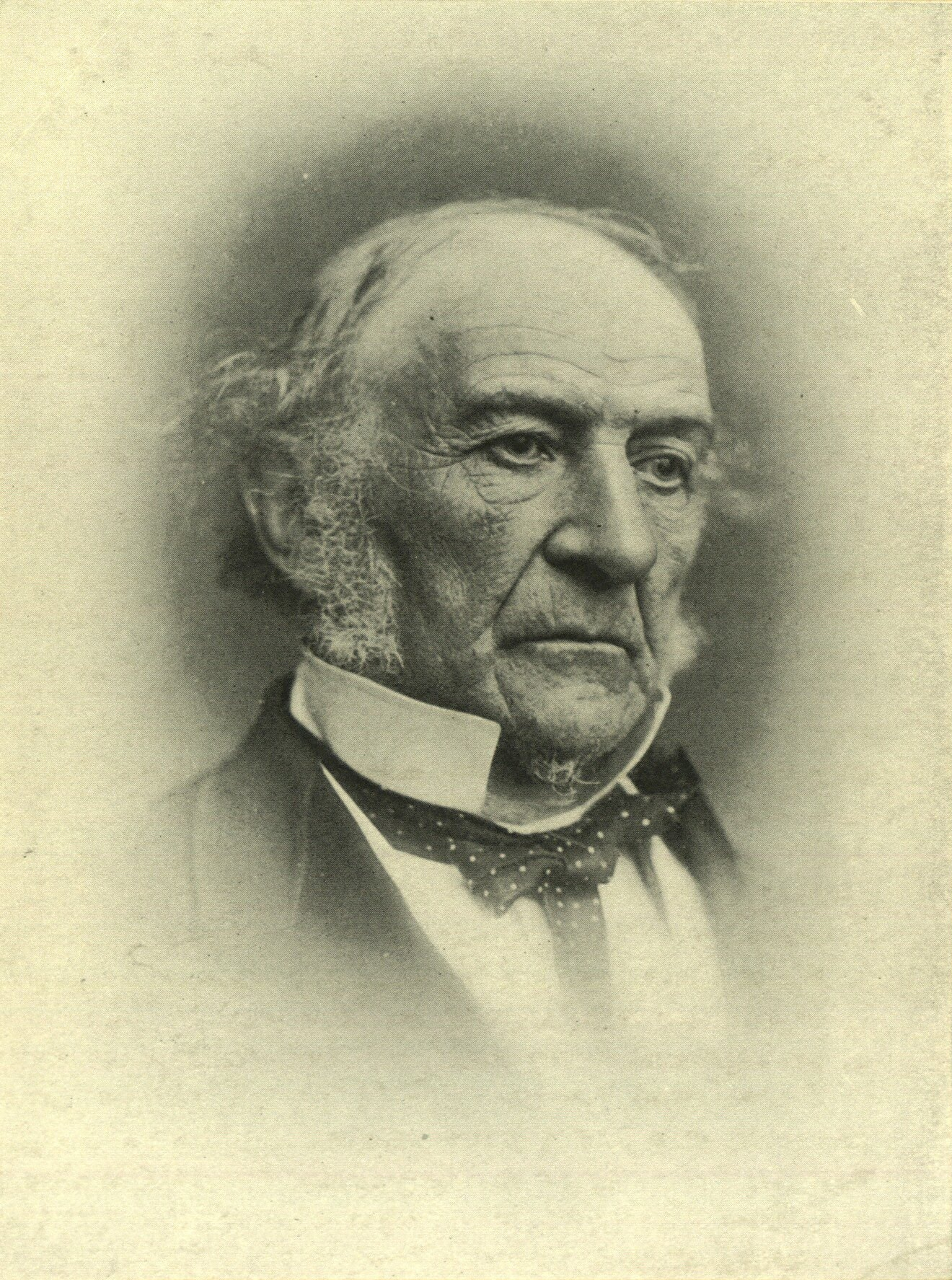
- Gladstone
- Date formed: 15 August 1892
- Date dissolved: 2 March 1894

People and organisations
- Monarch: Victoria
- Prime Minister: William Gladstone
- Member party: Liberal Party
- Status in legislature: Minority dependent on IPP support
- Opposition party: Conservative Party
- Opposition leaders: Arthur Balfour in the House of Commons; Lord Salisbury in the House of Lords

History
- Election: 1892 general election
- Legislature terms: 25th UK Parliament
- Predecessor: Second Salisbury ministry
- Successor: Rosebery ministry

Portfolio	Minister	Term
Cabinet ministers
Prime Minister; First Lord of the Treasury; Lord Privy Seal; Leader of the House of Commons	William Ewart Gladstone MP	1892–94
Lord Chancellor	Farrer Herschell, 1st Baron Herschell	1892–95
Lord President of the Council; Secretary of State for India; Leader of the House of Lords	John Wodehouse, 1st Earl of Kimberley	1892–94
Home Secretary	H. H. Asquith MP	1892–95
Foreign Secretary	Archibald Primrose, 5th Earl of Rosebery	1892–94
Secretary of State for the Colonies	George Robinson, 1st Marquess of Ripon	1892–95
Secretary of State for War	Sir Henry Campbell-Bannerman MP	1892–95
Chancellor of the Exchequer; Second Lord of the Treasury	Sir William Harcourt MP	1892–95
First Lord of the Admiralty	John Spencer, 5th Earl Spencer	1892–95
President of the Board of Trade	A. J. Mundella MP	1892–94
Postmaster General	Arnold Morley MP	1892–95
President of the Local Government Board	Henry Fowler MP	1892–94
Chancellor of the Duchy of Lancaster	James Bryce MP	1892–94
First Commissioner of Works	George Shaw-Lefevre MP	1892–94
Chief Secretary for Ireland	John Morley MP	1892–95
Secretary for Scotland	Sir George Trevelyan, 2nd Baronet MP	1892–95
Vice-President of the Committee of the Council on Education	Arthur Dyke Acland MP	1892–95

=== Rosebery ministry ===
Rosebery ministry
- 1894–1895
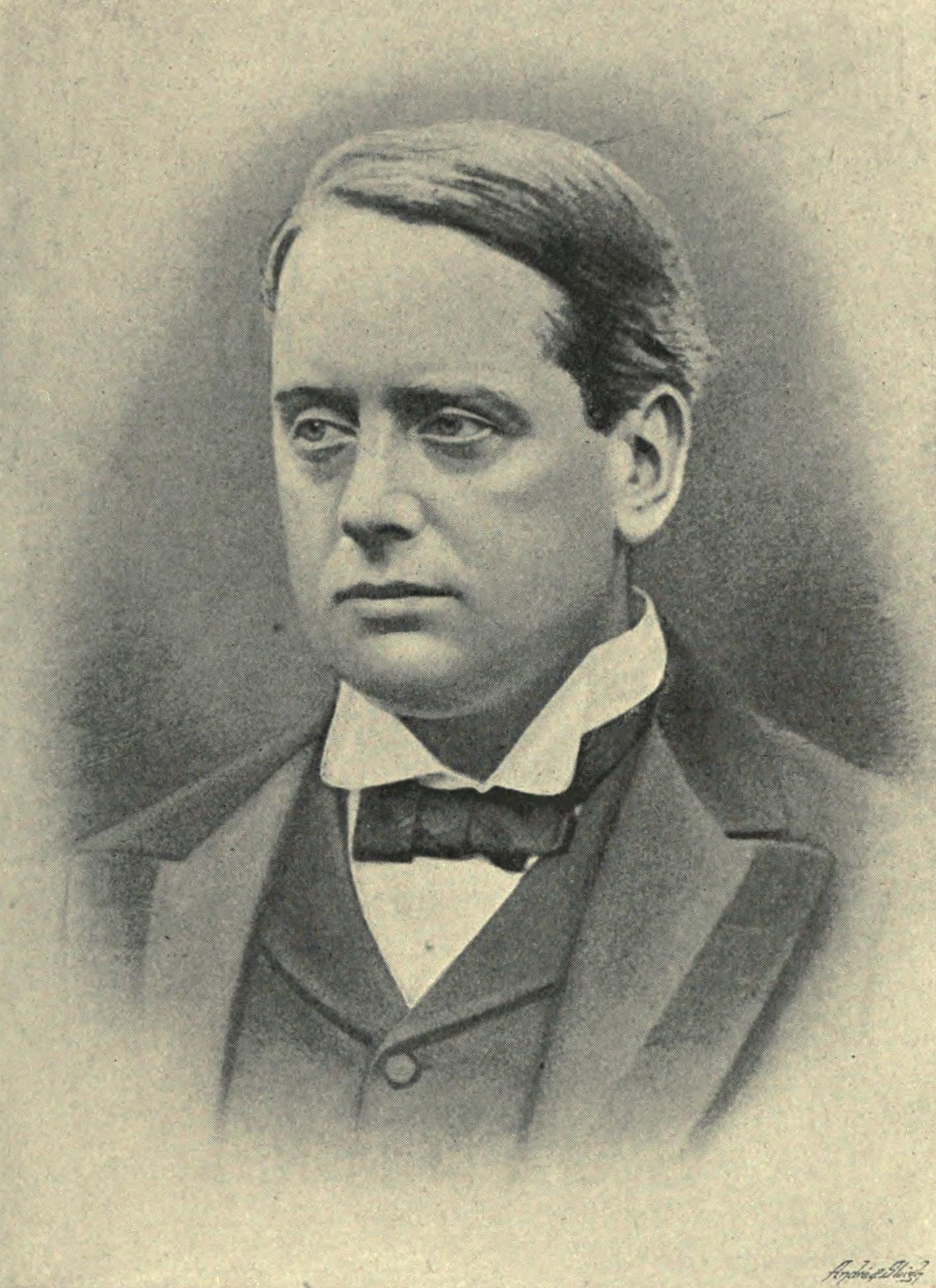
- Rosebery (c. 1895)
- Date formed: 5 March 1894
- Date dissolved: 22 June 1895

People and organisations
- Monarch: Victoria
- Prime Minister: Lord Rosebery
- Member party: Liberal Party
- Status in legislature: Minority dependent on IPP support
- Opposition party: Conservative Party
- Opposition leaders: Arthur Balfour in the House of Commons; Lord Salisbury in the House of Lords

History
- Legislature terms: 25th UK Parliament lost a vote of confidence
- Predecessor: Fourth Gladstone ministry
- Successor: Third Salisbury ministry

Portfolio	Minister	Term
Cabinet ministers
Prime Minister; First Lord of the Treasury; Lord President of the Council; Leader of the House of Lords	Archibald Primrose, 5th Earl of Rosebery	1894–95
Lord Chancellor	Farrer Herschell, 1st Baron Herschell	1892–95
Lord Privy Seal	Edward Marjoribanks, 2nd Baron Tweedmouth	1894–95
Home Secretary	H. H. Asquith MP	1892–95
Foreign secretary	John Wodehouse, 1st Earl of Kimberley	1894–95
Secretary of State for the Colonies	George Robinson, 1st Marquess of Ripon	1892–95
Secretary of State for War	Sir Henry Campbell-Bannerman MP	1892–95
Secretary of State for India	Henry Fowler MP	1894–95
Chancellor of the Exchequer; Second Lord of the Treasury; Leader of the House of Commons	Sir William Harcourt MP	1892–95
First Lord of the Admiralty	John Spencer, 5th Earl Spencer	1892–95
President of the Board of Trade	A. J. Mundella MP	1892–94
President of the Board of Trade	James Bryce MP	1894–95
Postmaster General	Arnold Morley MP	1892–95
President of the Local Government Board	George Shaw-Lefevre MP	1894–95
Chancellor of the Duchy of Lancaster	James Bryce MP	1892–94
Chancellor of the Duchy of Lancaster	Edward Marjoribanks, 2nd Baron Tweedmouth	1894–95
Chief Secretary for Ireland	John Morley MP	1892–95
Secretary for Scotland	Sir George Trevelyan, 2nd Baronet MP	1892–95
Vice-President of the Committee of the Council on Education	Arthur Dyke Acland MP	1892–95

==== Changes ====
- May 1894 – James Bryce succeeds A. J. Mundella at the Board of Trade. Lord Tweedmouth succeeds Bryce at the Duchy of Lancaster, remaining also Lord Privy Seal.

== List of ministers ==
Cabinet members are listed in bold face.

Office	Name	Date
Prime Minister First Lord of the Treasury	**William Ewart Gladstone** (Note: Also Leader of the House of Commons.)	15 August 1892 – 2 March 1894
Prime Minister First Lord of the Treasury	**Archibald Primrose, 5th Earl of Rosebery** (Note: Also Leader of the House of Lords.)	5 March 1894 – 21 June 1895
Chancellor of the Exchequer	**Sir William Vernon Harcourt** (Note: Also Leader of the House of Commons 1894–1895.)	18 August 1892
Parliamentary Secretary to the Treasury	Edward Marjoribanks (Note: Succeeded as 2nd Baron Tweedmouth 4 March 1894.)	18 August 1892
Parliamentary Secretary to the Treasury	T. E. Ellis	10 March 1894
Financial Secretary to the Treasury	Sir John Tomlinson Hibbert	18 August 1892
Junior Lords of the Treasury	T. E. Ellis	22 August 1892 – 21 June 1895
Junior Lords of the Treasury	Richard Causton	22 August 1892 – 21 June 1895
Junior Lords of the Treasury	William Alexander McArthur	22 August 1892 – 21 June 1895
Lord Chancellor	**Farrer Herschell, 1st Baron Herschell**	18 August 1892
Lord President of the Council	**John Wodehouse, 1st Earl of Kimberley** (Note: Also Leader of the House of Lords 18 August 1892 – 5 March 1894.)	18 August 1892
Lord President of the Council	**Archibald Primrose, 5th Earl of Rosebery**	10 March 1894
Lord Privy Seal	**William Ewart Gladstone**	20 August 1892
Lord Privy Seal	**Edward Marjoribanks, 2nd Baron Tweedmouth**	10 March 1894
Secretary of State for the Home Department	**H. H. Asquith**	18 August 1892
Under-Secretary of State for the Home Department	Herbert Gladstone	19 August 1892
Under-Secretary of State for the Home Department	George W. E. Russell	12 March 1894
Secretary of State for Foreign Affairs	**Archibald Primrose, 5th Earl of Rosebery**	18 August 1892
Secretary of State for Foreign Affairs	**John Wodehouse, 1st Earl of Kimberley**	11 March 1894
Parliamentary Under-Secretary of State for Foreign Affairs	Sir Edward Grey, 3rd Baronet	19 August 1892
Secretary of State for War	**Henry Campbell-Bannerman**	18 August 1892
Under-Secretary of State for War	William Mansfield, 2nd Baron Sandhurst	22 August 1892
Under-Secretary of State for War	Robert Collier, 2nd Baron Monkswell	5 January 1895
Financial Secretary to the War Office	William Woodall	22 August 1892
Secretary of State for the Colonies	**George Robinson, 1st Marquess of Ripon**	18 August 1892
Under-Secretary of State for the Colonies	Sydney Buxton	18 August 1892
Secretary of State for India	**John Wodehouse, 1st Earl of Kimberley**	18 August 1892
Secretary of State for India	**Henry Fowler**	10 March 1894
Under-Secretary of State for India	George W. E. Russell	19 August 1892
Under-Secretary of State for India	Donald Mackay, 11th Lord Reay	11 March 1894
First Lord of the Admiralty	**John Spencer, 5th Earl Spencer**	19 August 1892
Parliamentary and Financial Secretary to the Admiralty	Sir Ughtred Kay-Shuttleworth	19 August 1892
Civil Lord of the Admiralty	Edmund Robertson	25 August 1892
Vice-President of the Committee on Education	**Arthur Dyke Acland**	25 August 1892
Chief Secretary for Ireland	**John Morley**	22 August 1892
Lord Lieutenant of Ireland	Robert Offley Ashburton Milnes, 2nd Baron Houghton	18 August 1892
Chancellor of the Duchy of Lancaster	**James Bryce**	18 August 1892
Chancellor of the Duchy of Lancaster	**The Lord Tweedmouth**	28 May 1894
President of the Local Government Board	**Henry Fowler**	18 August 1892
President of the Local Government Board	**George Shaw-Lefevre**	1894
Postmaster-General	**Arnold Morley**	18 August 1892
Secretary for Scotland	**Sir George Trevelyan, 2nd Baronet**	18 August 1892
President of the Board of Trade	**A. J. Mundella**	18 August 1892
President of the Board of Trade	**James Bryce**	28 May 1894
Parliamentary Secretary to the Board of Trade	Thomas Burt	18 August 1892
First Commissioner of Works	**George Shaw-Lefevre**	18 August 1892
First Commissioner of Works	Herbert Gladstone	10 March 1894
President of the Board of Agriculture	Herbert Gardner	25 August 1892
Paymaster General	Charles Seale-Hayne	18 August 1892
Attorney General	Sir Charles Russell	20 August 1892
Attorney General	Sir John Rigby	3 May 1894
Attorney General	Sir Robert Threshie Reid	24 October 1894
Solicitor General	Sir John Rigby	20 August 1892
Solicitor General	Sir Robert Threshie Reid	3 May 1894
Solicitor General	Sir Frank Lockwood	28 October 1894
Judge Advocate General	Sir Francis Jeune	31 December 1892
Lord Advocate	John Balfour	20 August 1892
Solicitor General for Scotland	Alexander Asher	20 August 1892
Solicitor General for Scotland	Thomas Shaw	22 March 1894
Attorney-General for Ireland	Hugh Hyacinth O'Rorke MacDermot	August 1892
Solicitor-General for Ireland	Charles Hemphill	August 1892
Lord Steward of the Household	Gavin Campbell, 1st Marquess of Breadalbane	25 August 1892
Lord Chamberlain of the Household	Charles Wynn-Carrington, 3rd Baron Carrington	25 August 1892
Vice-Chamberlain of the Household	Charles Spencer	25 August 1892
Master of the Horse	William Monson, 1st Viscount Oxenbridge	25 August 1892
Master of the Horse	Richard Boyle, 9th Earl of Cork	19 March 1894
Treasurer of the Household	Edwyn Scudamore-Stanhope, 10th Earl of Chesterfield	25 August 1892
Treasurer of the Household	Arthur Brand	13 March 1894
Comptroller of the Household	George Leveson-Gower	25 August 1892
Captain of the Gentlemen-at-Arms	George Venables-Vernon, 7th Baron Vernon	25 August 1892
Captain of the Gentlemen-at-Arms	Edwyn Scudamore-Stanhope, 10th Earl of Chesterfield	13 March 1894
Captain of the Yeomen of the Guard	William Edwardes, 4th Baron Kensington	25 August 1892
Master of the Buckhounds	Thomas Lister, 4th Baron Ribblesdale	25 August 1892
Mistress of the Robes	Vacant	—
Lords-in-Waiting	John Dalberg-Acton, 1st Baron Acton	19 September 1892 – 21 June 1895
Lords-in-Waiting	Francis Stonor, 4th Baron Camoys	19 September 1892 – 21 June 1895
Lords-in-Waiting	John Hamilton, 1st Baron Hamilton of Dalzell	19 September 1892 – 1 May 1894
Lords-in-Waiting	Robert Collier, 2nd Baron Monkswell	19 September 1892 – 4 February 1895
Lords-in-Waiting	Frederick Glyn, 4th Baron Wolverton	19 September 1892 – 14 June 1893
Lords-in-Waiting	Lyon Playfair, 1st Baron Playfair	26 November 1892 – 21 June 1895
Lords-in-Waiting	Thomas Brassey, 1st Baron Brassey	14 June 1893 – 21 June 1895
Lords-in-Waiting	Francis Douglas, Viscount Drumlanrig	1 July 1893 – 18 October 1894
Lords-in-Waiting	Cecil Foljambe, 1st Baron Hawkesbury	1 May 1894 – 21 June 1895
Lords-in-Waiting	Sidney Hobart-Hampden-Mercer-Henderson, 7th Earl of Buckinghamshire	17 January 1895 – 21 June 1895
Lords-in-Waiting	Granville Leveson-Gower, 3rd Earl Granville	4 February 1895 – 21 June 1895

Notes

Preceded by Second Salisbury ministry	Government of the United Kingdom; 1892–1895	Succeeded by Third Salisbury ministry
