= Donald Southgate (historian) =

British historian (1924–2005)

Donald Southgate (31 October 1924 – 12 February 2005) was a British historian of nineteenth century British political history.

He studied for his DPhil at Christ Church, Oxford, where he was also president of the Conservative Association. He then taught at Exeter University, Rhodes University in South Africa, Glasgow University and Queen's College, Dundee which became the University of Dundee in 1967. He was appointed reader at Dundee in 1968 and was dean of the faculty of arts during 1976–77.

== Works ==
- The Passing of the Whigs, 1832–1886 (London: Macmillan, 1962).
- ‘The Most English Minister...’ The Policies and Politics of Palmerston (London: Macmillan, 1966).
- (editor), The Conservative Leadership, 1832–1932 (London: Macmillan, 1974).
- University Education in Dundee: A Centenary History (Edinburgh: Published for the University of Dundee by Edinburgh University Press, 1982). ISBN 0852244347
