= Bayning =

Bayning is a surname. Notable people with the surname include:

- Baron Bayning, of Foxley in the County of Berkshire, a title in the Peerage of Great Britain
- Charles Powlett, 2nd Baron Bayning (1785–1823), British peer and Tory Member of Parliament
- Charles Townshend, 1st Baron Bayning PC (1728–1810), British politician
- Henry Powlett, 3rd Baron Bayning (1797–1866), British peer and clergyman
- Viscount Bayning, of Sudbury, was a title created for the 1st Baron Bayning on 8 March 1628
- Viscountess Bayning, of Foxley, was a title in the Peerage of England
- Paul Bayning (disambiguation), multiple people
