= Paul Bayning =

Paul Bayning may refer to:

- Paul Bayning, 1st Viscount Bayning (1588–1629), Viscount Bayning
- Paul Bayning, 2nd Viscount Bayning (1616–1638), Viscount Bayning

== See also ==
- Bayning (surname)
