= Shelburne ministry =

Government of Great Britain

- 1782–1783
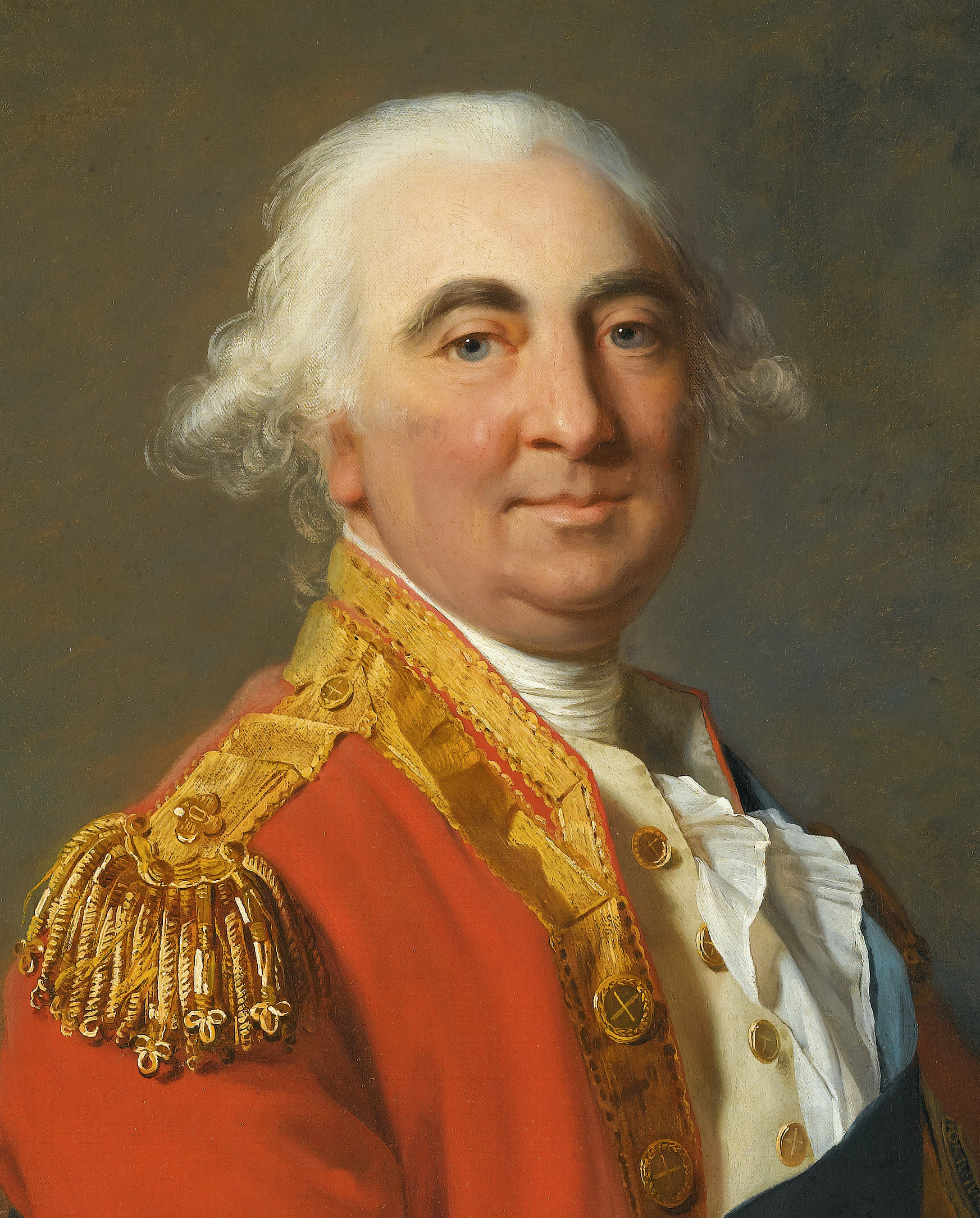
- Shelburne (1791)
- Date formed: 4 July 1782
- Date dissolved: 26 March 1783

People and organisations
- Monarch: George III
- Prime Minister: William Petty, 2nd Earl of Shelburne
- Total no. of members: 16 appointments
- Member parties: Chathamites; Rockingham Whigs
- Status in legislature: Majority (coalition)
- Opposition parties: Foxites; Grenvillites
- Opposition leaders: Charles James Fox; Frederick North, Lord North

History
- Legislature terms: 15th GB Parliament
- Predecessor: Second Rockingham ministry
- Successor: Fox–North coalition

This is a list of the principal holders of government office during the premiership of the Earl of Shelburne between July 1782 and April 1783.

== History ==
Upon the fall of the North ministry in March 1782, Whig Charles Watson-Wentworth, 2nd Marquess of Rockingham became prime minister for a second time. He died in office four months later, and Home Secretary Lord Shelburne was invited to form a government. However, Charles James Fox and several other former Rockinghamites (including Lord John Cavendish and Edmund Burke) refused to serve under Shelburne and went into opposition. The Foxites allied with the supporters of Lord North to bring down the government, and the Fox–North coalition came to power in April 1783. This government did not long survive the hostility of King George III, and many of Shelburne's ministers returned to office under the leadership of William Pitt the Younger in December 1783, though Shelburne himself was consoled with the title Marquess of Lansdowne.

== Cabinet ==
Cabinet
Portfolio	Minister	Took office	Left office	Party
First Lord of the Treasury	William Petty, 2nd Earl of Shelburne (head of ministry)	4 July 1782	26 March 1783	Whig
Lord Chancellor	Edward Thurlow, 1st Baron Thurlow	3 June 1778	7 April 1783	Independent
Lord President of the Council	Charles Pratt, 1st Baron Camden	27 March 1782	2 April 1783	Whig
Lord Privy Seal	Augustus FitzRoy, 3rd Duke of Grafton	1782	1783	Whig
Chancellor of the Exchequer	William Pitt the Younger	10 July 1782	31 March 1783	Whig
Secretary of State for the Home Department	Thomas Townshend	10 July 1782	2 April 1783	Whig
Secretary of State for Foreign Affairs; First Lord of Trade	Thomas Robinson, 2nd Baron Grantham	13 July 1782 / 9 December 1780	2 April 1783	Whig
First Lord of the Admiralty	Augustus Keppel, 1st Viscount Keppel	1782	1783	Whig
First Lord of the Admiralty	Richard Howe, 4th Viscount Howe	1783	1788	Independent
Chancellor of the Duchy of Lancaster	John Dunning, 1st Baron Ashburton	17 April 1782	29 August 1783	Independent
Master-General of the Ordnance	Charles Lennox, 3rd Duke of Richmond	1782	1783	Whig

=== Changes ===
- January 1783 – Lord Howe succeeds Lord Keppel at the Admiralty.

== Ministers not in Cabinet ==
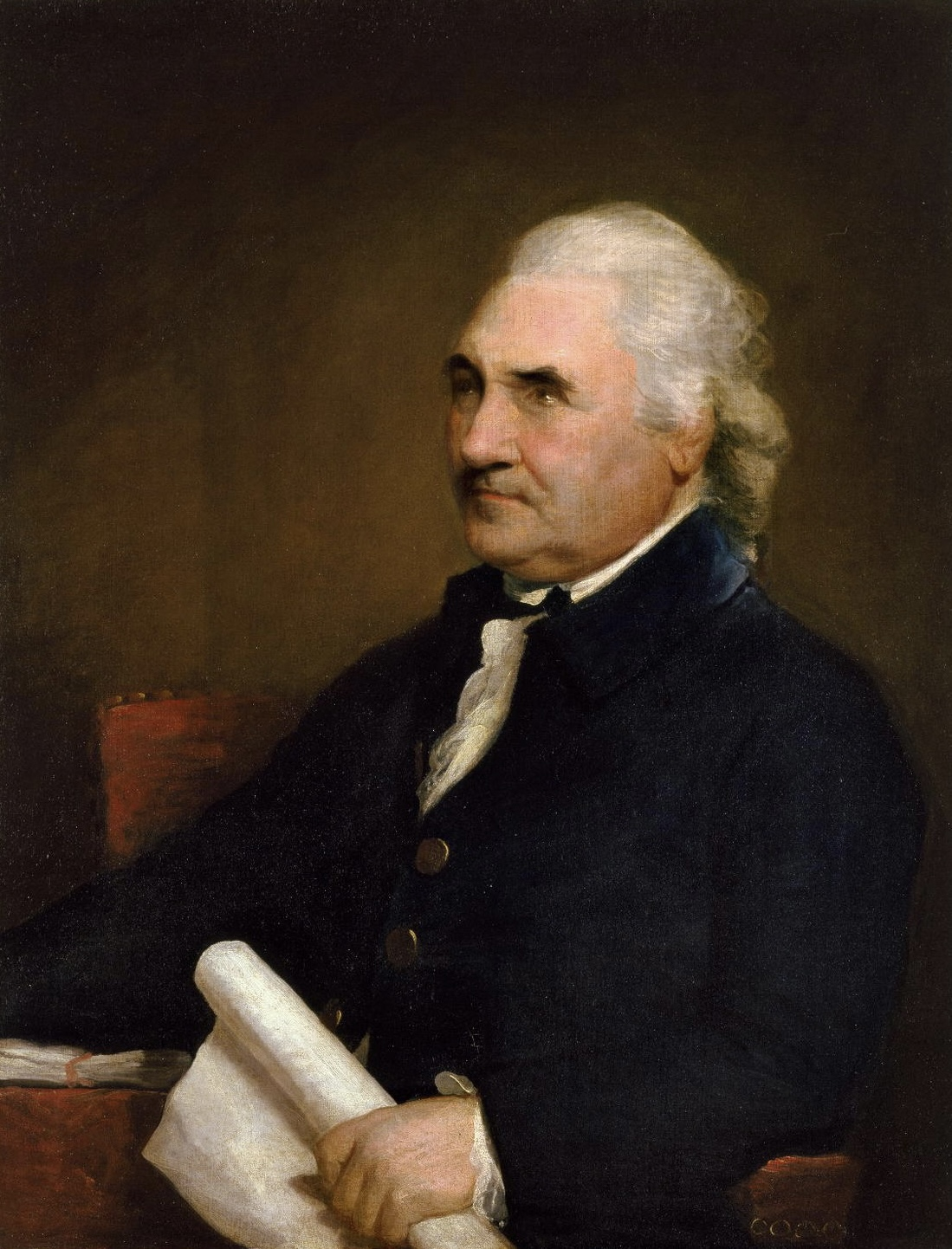
Portrait of Isaac Barré by Gilbert Stuart, 1785

- Henry Seymour Conway – Commander-in-Chief of the Forces
- Henry Dundas – Treasurer of the Navy
- Sir George Yonge, 5th Baronet – Secretary at War
- Isaac Barré – Paymaster of the Forces
- Charles Manners, 4th Duke of Rutland – Lord Steward of the Household

== Notes ==
Preceded by Second Rockingham ministry	Government of Great Britain; 1782–1783	Succeeded by Fox–North coalition
