= Second Rockingham ministry =

Government of Great Britain

- March–July 1782
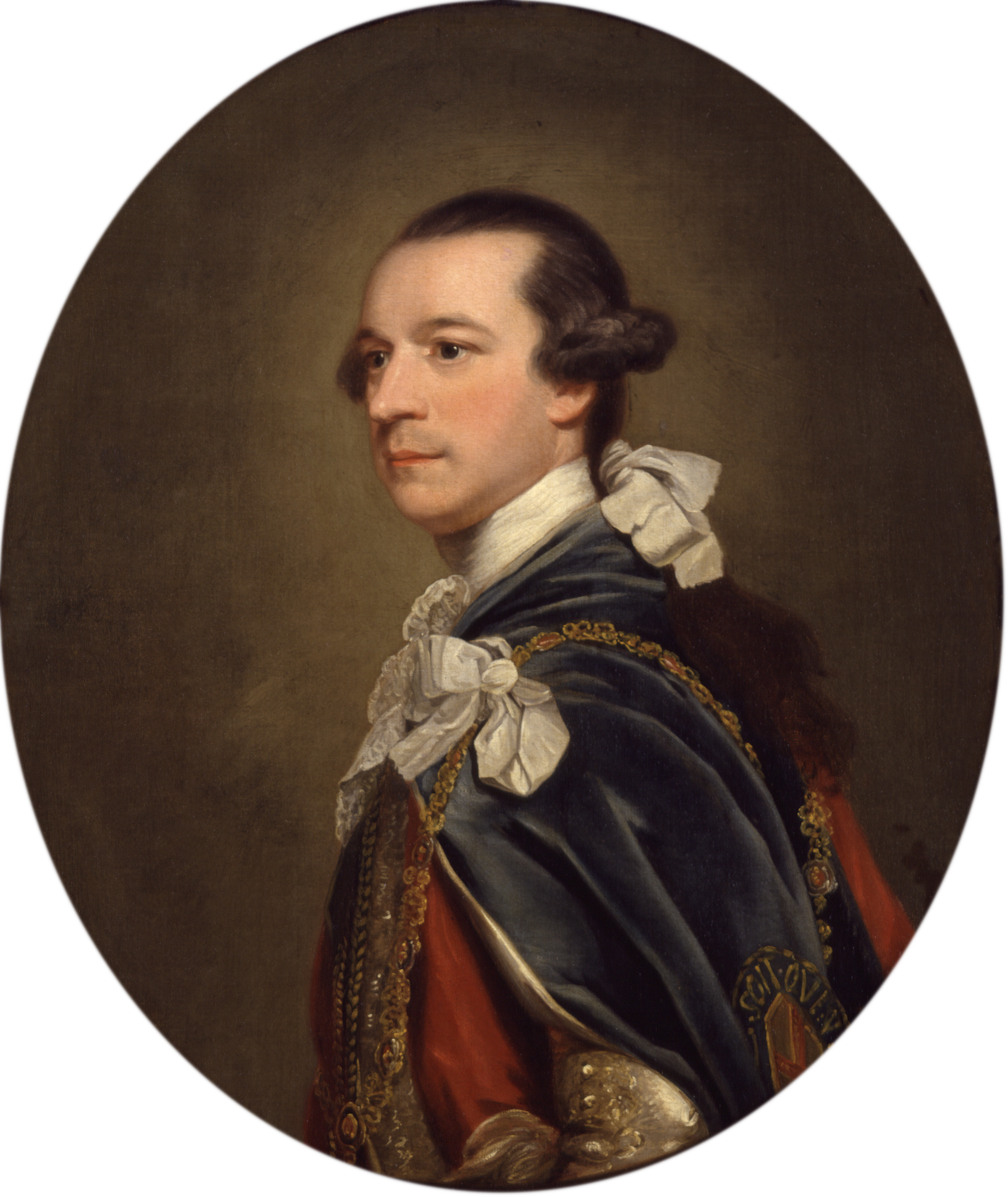
- Rockingham (after Joshua Reynolds)
- Date formed: 27 March 1782
- Date dissolved: 1 July 1782

People and organisations
- Monarch: George III
- Prime Minister: Charles Watson-Wentworth, 2nd Marquess of Rockingham
- Total no. of members: 16 appointments
- Member party: Rockingham Whigs
- Status in legislature: Majority
- Opposition party: Grenvillites

History
- Legislature terms: 15th GB Parliament
- Predecessor: North ministry
- Successor: Shelburne ministry

This is a list of the principal holders of government office during the second premiership of the Charles Watson-Wentworth, 2nd Marquess of Rockingham for four months in 1782.

== History ==
The North ministry resigned on 22 March 1782 after losing the confidence of Parliament following the British defeat at the siege of Yorktown during the American War of Independence. Whig Lord Rockingham, Prime Minister from 1765 to 1766, formed a government. The Rockingham Whigs had generally been sympathetic to the cause of the Colonists and under Rockingham the British government began the negotiations leading to the Peace of Paris that concluded the war.

The death of Rockingham on 1 July 1782 caused a split in the ministry. The Home Secretary Lord Shelburne was appointed to succeed him, but several members of the government refused to serve under him and resigned. These "Portland Whigs" (named after their nominal leader, William Cavendish-Bentinck, 3rd Duke of Portland, but in reality led by Charles James Fox) allied in opposition with Lord North and brought down the Shelburne ministry in 1783. The Portland Whigs came to power as the Fox–North coalition.

== Cabinet ==
Portfolio	Minister	Took office	Left office
First Lord of the Treasury	Charles Watson-Wentworth, 2nd Marquess of Rockingham (head of ministry)	27 March 1782	1 July 1782
Lord Chancellor	Edward Thurlow, 1st Baron Thurlow	3 June 1778	7 April 1783
Lord President of the Council	Charles Pratt, 1st Baron Camden	27 March 1782	2 April 1783
Lord Privy Seal	Augustus FitzRoy, 3rd Duke of Grafton	1782	1783
Chancellor of the Exchequer	Lord John Cavendish	27 March 1782	10 July 1782
Secretary of State for the Home Department; Leader of the House of Lords	William Petty, 2nd Earl of Shelburne	27 March 1782	10 July 1782
Secretary of State for Foreign Affairs; Leader of the House of Commons	Charles James Fox	27 March 1782	5 July 1782
First Lord of the Admiralty	Augustus Keppel, 1st Viscount Keppel	1782	1783
Chancellor of the Duchy of Lancaster	John Dunning, 1st Baron Ashburton	17 April 1782	29 August 1783
Master-General of the Ordnance	Charles Lennox, 3rd Duke of Richmond	1782	1783
Commander-in-Chief of the Forces	Henry Seymour Conway	1782	1783

== Ministers not in Cabinet ==
- Thomas Robinson, 2nd Baron Grantham – First Lord of Trade
- Isaac Barré – Treasurer of the Navy
- Thomas Townshend – Secretary at War
- Edmund Burke – Paymaster of the Forces
- William Cavendish-Bentinck, 3rd Duke of Portland – Lord Lieutenant of Ireland

Preceded by North ministry	Government of Great Britain; 1782	Succeeded by Shelburne ministry
