= Honingham =

Village in Norfolk, England

Coordinates: 52.66345°N 1.10838°E

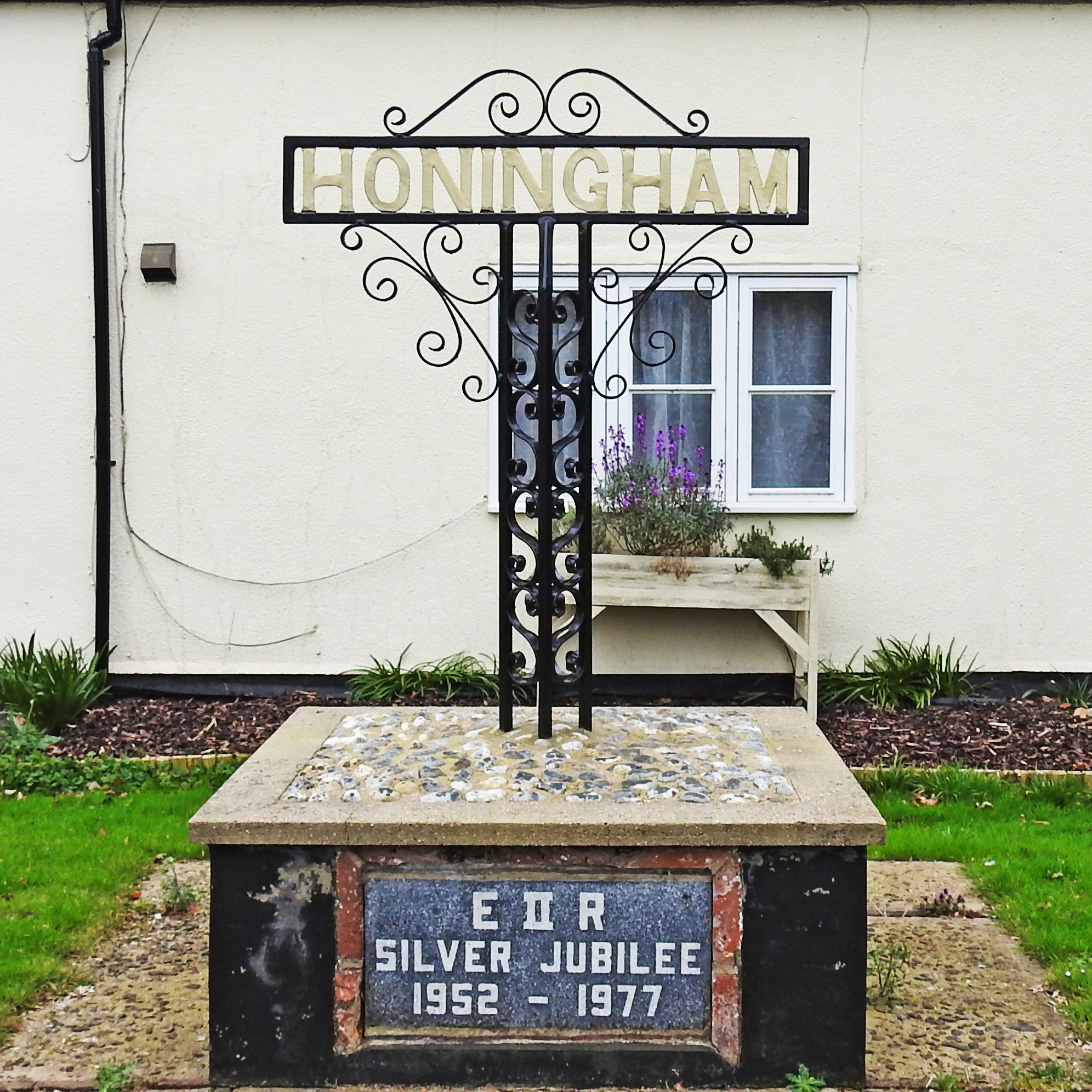
- Honingham Village Sign

- Location within Norfolk
- Area: 4.07 sq mi (10.5 km^{2})
- Population: 374 (2021 census)
  - Density: 92/sq mi (36/km^{2})
- OS grid reference: TG102118
- Civil parish: Honingham
- District: Broadland
- Shire county: Norfolk
- Region: East
- Country: England
- Sovereign state: United Kingdom
- Post town: NORWICH
- Postcode district: NR9
- Dialling code: 01603
- UK Parliament: Broadland and Fakenham

Honingham is a village and civil parish in the English county of Norfolk.

Honingham is located 7 miles (11 km) east of Dereham and 8 miles (13 km) west of Norwich along the A47 and the River Tud.

== Correct pronunciation ==
"Hunningham"; "Hunningum"

== History ==
A hoard of Iceni silver coins were found in the parish in 1954 which were likely buried during the Boudican Revolt of 60 AD.

Honingham's name is of Anglo-Saxon origin and derives from the Old English for the homestead of Huna's people.

In the Domesday Book, Honingham is listed as a settlement of 22 households hundred of Forehoe. In 1086, the village was part of the East Anglian estates of Alan, Count of Brittany.

During the Second World War, parts of the parish became RAF Attlebridge which was used by No. 2 Group RAF, the 319th Bombardment Group and the 466th Bombardment Group.

== Geography ==
According to the 2021 census, Honingham has a population of 374 people which shows an increase from the 358 people recorded in the 2011 census.

The River Tud passes through the village as does the A47, between Birmingham and Lowestoft.

== St. Andrew's Church ==
Honingham's parish church is dedicated to Saint Andrew and dates from the Fourteenth Century. St. Andrew's is located on Dereham Road and has been Grade II listed since 1961. The church is no longer open for Sunday service.

St. Andrew's was heavily restored during the Victorian era and features stained-glass windows designed by George W. Taylor.

== Honingham Hall ==
Honingham Hall was built in the Seventeenth Century and remained a private residence until it became a Barnardo's Home during the Second World War. The building was demolished in the 1960s.

== Windmill ==
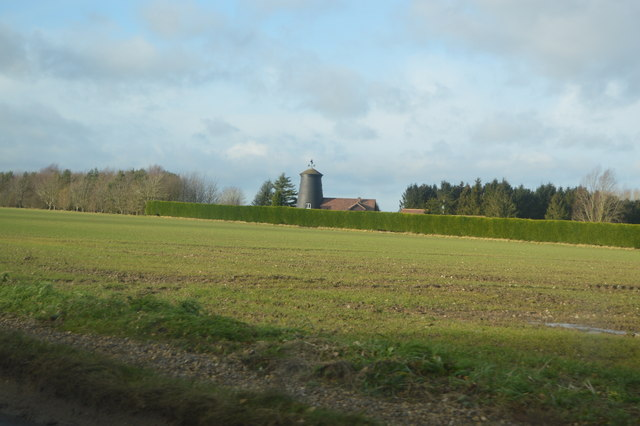
Honingham Windmill

A tower mill was built in Honingham between 1826 and 1834. It worked until the 1890s then became derelict. It was converted to residential accommodation in 1981.

== Notable residents ==
- Richard Catlyn MP- (1520–1556) politician, Lord of Honingham Hall.
- Sir Thomas Richardson MP- (1659–1635) judge & Speaker of the House of Commons, Lord of Honingham Hall.
- Richard Baylie- (1585–1667) University of Oxford administrator & clergyman, Lord of Honingham Hall.
- Paul Bayning, 1st Viscount Bayning- (1588–1629) peer, Lord of Honingham Hall.
- William Townshend MP- (1702–1738) politician, Lord of Honingham Hall.
- Charles Townshend, 1st Baron Bayning- (1728–1810) politician, Lord of Honinghall Hall.
- Charles Powlett MP, 2nd Baron Bayning- (1785–1823) peer & politician, Lord of Honingham Hall.
- Henry William-Powlett, 3rd Baron Bayning- (1797–1866) peer & clergyman, Lord of Honingham Hall.
- Clare Sewell Read MP- (1826–1905) agriculturalist and politician, lived in Honingham.
- Ailwyn Fellowes KCVO KBE, 1st Baron Ailwyn- (1855–1924) businessman, farmer & politician, Lord of Honingham Hall.
- Sir Eric Teichman- (1884–1944) diplomat & orientalist, Lord of Honingham Hall.

== Governance ==
Honingham is part of the electoral ward of Great Witchingham for local elections and is part of the district of Broadland.

The village's national constituency is Broadland and Fakenham which has been represented by the Conservative Party's Jerome Mayhew MP since 2019.

== War Memorial ==
Honingham War Memorial is a wooden triptych at the junction of The Street and Hall Drive which was erected by a committee led by Ailwyn Fellowes and dedicated in 1919 by Bertram Pollock, Bishop of Norwich. The memorial lists the following names for the First World War:

Rank	Name	Unit	Date of death	Burial/Commemoration
Capt.	Hedworth Fellowes MC	11th King Edward's Own Lancers	12 May 1917	Hervin Farm Cemetery
Sgt.	Edgar H. Fisher	5th Bn., Norfolk Regiment	19 Apr. 1917	Gaza War Cemetery
Sgt.	Joseph Fisher	5th Bn., Norfolk Regt.	19 Apr. 1917	Gaza War Cemetery
Cpl.	Albert G. Howard	8th Bn., Norfolk Regt.	11 Aug. 1917	Menin Gate
LCpl.	William Curson	5th Bn., Norfolk Regt.	20 Apr. 1917	Deir al-Balah Cemetery
Pte.	Edward E. Grief	1st Bn., Bedfordshire Regiment	12 May 1918	Thiennes Cemetery
Pte.	George E. Skipper	8th Bn., Border Regiment	8 Jul. 1916	Étaples Military Cemetery
Pte.	George E. Barker	12th Bn., East Surrey Regiment	22 Oct. 1918	Harelbeke Cemetery
Pte.	Wilfred C. Oswick	23rd Bn., Royal Fusiliers	21 Feb. 1917	Dernancourt Cemetery
Pte.	Walter Coleman	1st Bn., Norfolk Regiment	1 Jul. 1915	St. Sever Cemetery
Pte.	Arthur H. Hazell	1st Bn., Norfolk Regt.	6 May 1919	St. Andrew's Churchyard
Pte.	Wilfred S. Curtis	5th Bn., Norfolk Regt.	12 Aug. 1915	Helles Memorial
Pte.	Herbert T. Howard	5th Bn., Norfolk Regt.	1 Oct. 1915	Helles Memorial
Pte.	Reggie Stone	7th Bn., Norfolk Regt.	12 Oct. 1916	Cabaret-Rouge Cemetery
Pte.	William H. Jessup	5th Cavalry Reserve Regiment	11 Jul. 1918	St. Andrew's Churchyard
P2C	Frederick W. Grand	Royal Air Force	3 Oct. 1918	Deseronto Cemetery
