= Greisley =

Greisley is a surname. Notable people with the surname include:

- Roger Greisley (1799–1837), English author and politician
- Henry Greisley (1615?–1678), English translator
