= Honingham Windmill =

Windmill in Norfolk, England

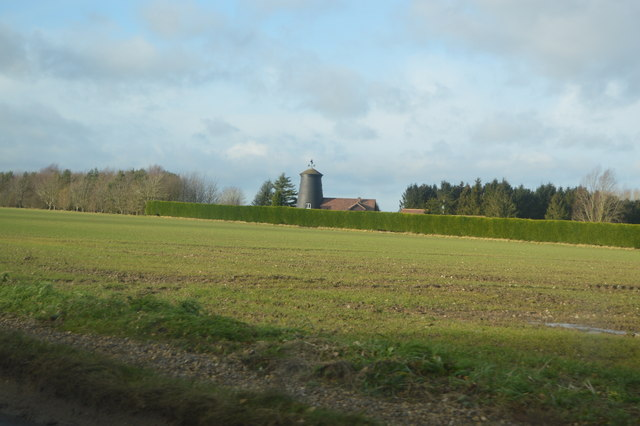
- Honingham Windmill, January 2015
- Interactive map of Honingham Windmill

Origin
- Mill name: Honingham Windmill
- Mill location: Honingham, Norfolk, United Kingdom
- Grid reference: TG 1015 1140
- Coordinates: 52°39′34″N 1°06′21″E

Information
- Purpose: Corn mill
- Type: Tower mill
- Storeys: Four storey tower
- No. of sails: Four
- Type of sails: Patent sails
- Windshaft: Cast iron
- Winding: Fantail
- No. of pairs of millstones: Two pairs

Honingham Windmill is a tower mill in Honingham, Norfolk, United Kingdom. It was built between 1826 and 1834 and worked by wind until the 1890s. The derelict mill was converted to residential accommodation in 1981.

== History ==
Honingham Windmill was not marked on Bryant's 1826 map of Norfolk. It was marked on Greenwood's 1834 map of Norfolk. The mill was worked with nearby Honingham Watermill. William Lewin was the miller from 1836–37. Later millers were Robert Johnson Neeve (1845–58), Edward Sendall (1863–68), Stephen Sendall in 1872, Stephen Millett (1878–87) Emma Millett and Frederick Cullum Millett (1887–1892). The Milletts were only working Honingham Watermill in 1896.

The mill was surveyed by Arthur C. Smith on 23 October 1970. It was described as a derelict tower with the base frame of the cap. The windshaft, brake wheel and some machinery remained. The mill was stripped of its machinery in 1975. Planning permission was granted in 1980 for the mill to be converted to residential use. The remains of the cap frame were removed in November 1980 by John Lawn, the Caston millwright. The conversion was completed in October 1981.

== Description ==
Honingham Windmill is a four storey tower mill. The tower is 23 feet 0 inches (7.01 m) diameter at the base and 38 feet 0 inches (11.58 m) tall. It had a boat shaped cap with a petticoat and gallery. A cast iron windshaft carried four Patent sails, and a 10 feet 0 inches (3.05 m) diameter cast iron brake wheel, which Rex Wailes described as the largest he had seen in an English windmill. The upright shaft was a composite one, cast iron at the top and wood at the bottom. It carried a cast iron wallower and a wooden clasp arm great spur wheel. Two pairs of millstones were driven underdrift. The lower sprattle beam, which carried the upright shaft, survives. It is marked "T Smithdale Norwich", indicating it was a replacement and cast between 1853 and 1879.
