= Harry Powlett =

(Lord) Harry Powlett may refer to:

- Harry Powlett, 4th Duke of Bolton (1691–1759), so called from 1691 until 1754
- Harry Powlett, 6th Duke of Bolton (1720–1794), so called from 1754 until 1765
- Harry Powlett, 4th Duke of Cleveland (1803–1859)

== See also ==
- Henry Powlett, 3rd Baron Bayning
