= Henry William-Powlett, 3rd Baron Bayning =

British peer and clergyman

Henry William-Powlett, 3rd Baron Bayning (8 June 1797 – 5 August 1866), styled The Honourable until 1823, was a British peer and clergyman.

== Background ==
Born Henry Townshend in London, he was the second son of Charles Townshend, 1st Baron Bayning, son of William Townshend and his wife Henrietta Powlett. His mother was Annabella Smith-Powlett, daughter of Reverend Richard Smith and Annabella Powlett. He was educated at Eton College and when then to St John's College, Cambridge, graduating with a Master of Arts in 1818.

== Career ==
He was appointed rector of Brome, Suffolk in 1821. Two years later, he succeeded his elder brother Charles in the barony and assumed by Royal licence the surnames of William Powlett in lieu of Townshend. He was nominated a rural dean of the diocese of Norwich in 1844 and three years thereafter resigned the rectory. Powlett was reappointed to his former post in Honingham in the county of Norfolk in 1851, becoming also vicar of East Tudenham. He lived at Honingham Hall in Norfolk.

== Family ==
Powlett married Emma, only daughter of William Henry Fellowes, in 1842. Their only son, Charles William Powlett, predeceased his parents in 1864, unmarried and aged only 19. Powlett died two years later, in August 1866, aged 69. Upon his death the barony became extinct. His wife survived Powlett until 1887. Part of his library was sold in 1826, upon giving up his London residence, by the auctioneers Stewart, Wheatley & Adlard, on 1 May 1826 (and five following days); a copy of the catalogue is held at Cambridge University Library (shelfmark Munby.c.151(11)). Emma Powlett was a keen amateur meteorologist and collected rainfall data for over 50 years.

== See also ==
- Marquess Townshend

== Notes ==
Peerage of Great Britain
Preceded by Charles Frederick Powlett	Baron Bayning; 1823–1866	Extinct
