= Henry Greisley =

English translator

Henry Greisley (c. 1615 – 8 June 1678) was an English translator.

Greisley was born about 1615, the son of John Greisley of Shrewsbury. In 1634 he was elected from Westminster School to a studentship at Christ Church, Oxford, as a member of which he proceeded B.A. 11 April 1638, M.A. 8 July 1641. For refusing to subscribe the engagement 'according to act of parliament' he was ejected from his studentship in March 1651. On 28 September 1661 he received institution to the rectory of Stoke-Severn, Worcestershire, and was installed a prebendary of Worcester on 19 April 1672. He was buried at Stoke-Severn, having died on 8 June 1678, at the age of sixty-three.

A memorial of him and of his wife Eleanor, daughter of Gervase Buck of Worcestershire, who died 17 January 1703, aged 64, is in Stoke-Severn Church. Greisley translated from the French of Balzac 'The Prince ... [by H. G.],’ 12mo, London, 1648; and from the French of Senault 'The Christian Man; or the Reparation of Nature by Grace' [anon.], 4to, London, 1650. 'Besides which translations,’ says Wood, 'he hath certain specimens of poetry extant, which have obtained him a place among those of that faculty.' He contributed a copy of English verses to the Christ Church collection entitled 'Death repeal'd' on the death of Paul Bayning, viscount Bayning of Sedbury, in June 1638; another in Latin is in the 'Horti Carolini Rosa Altera,’ after the queen had given birth to a son, Henry, in 1640.
