= 1774 British general election =

British Parliamentary election

- 5 October – 10 November 1774

All 558 seats in the House of Commons 280 seats needed for a majority
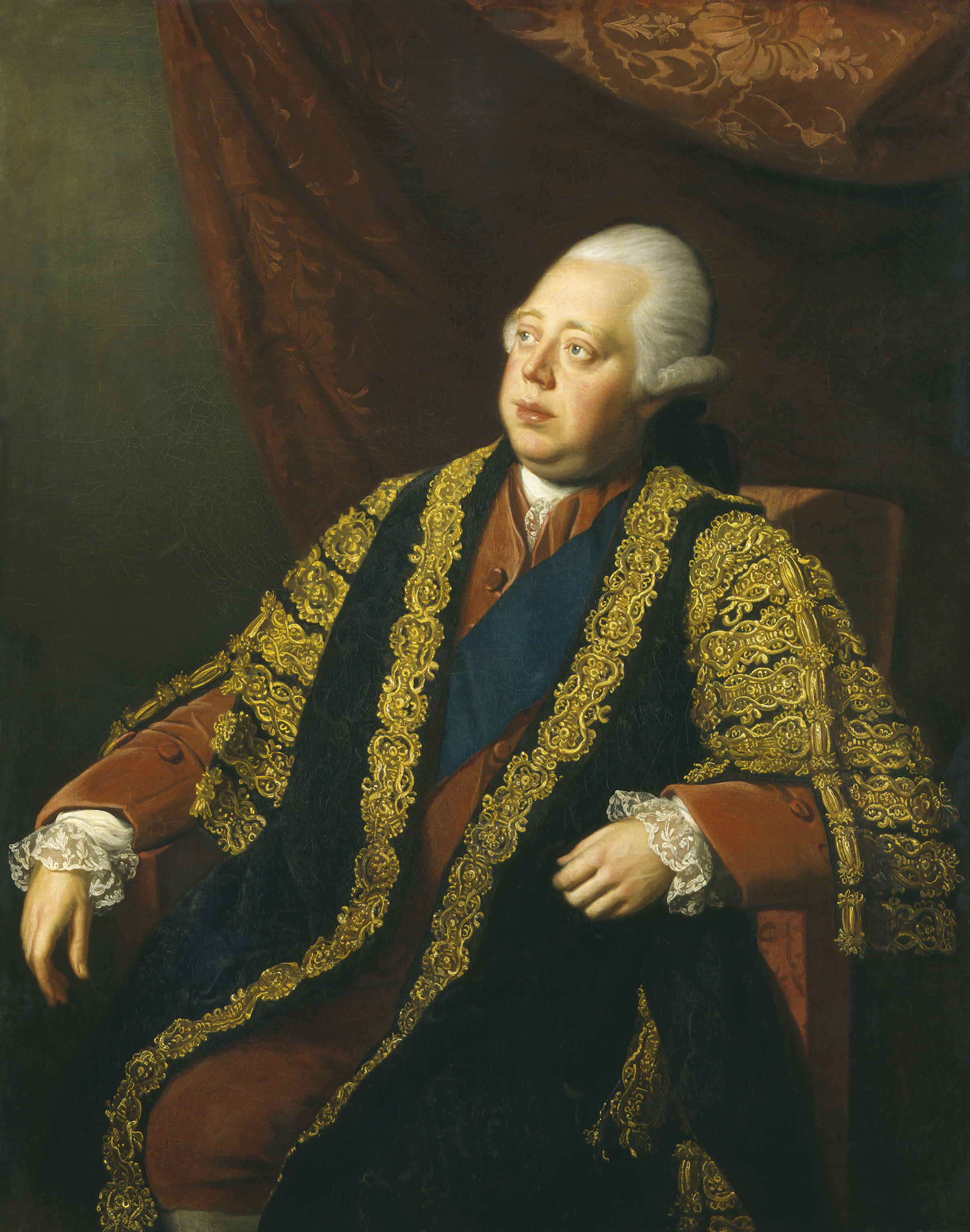

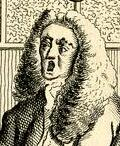
	First party	Second party
Leader	Lord North	William Dowdeswell
Party	Northite	Rockinghamite
Leader's seat	Banbury	Worcestershire
Seats won	343	215
- Composition of the House of Commons after the election
Prime Minister before election
Lord North
Northite
Prime Minister after
election
Lord North
Northite

The 1774 British general election returned members to serve in the House of Commons of the 14th Parliament of Great Britain to be held, after the merger of the Parliament of England and the Parliament of Scotland in 1707. Lord North's government was returned with a large majority. The opposition consisted of factions supporting the Marquess of Rockingham and William Pitt, 1st Earl of Chatham, both of whom referred to themselves as Whigs. North's opponents referred to his supporters as Tories, but no Tory party existed at the time and his supporters rejected the label.

== Summary of the constituencies ==
See 1796 British general election for details. The constituencies used were the same throughout the existence of the Parliament of Great Britain.

== Dates of election ==
The general election was held between 5 October 1774 and 10 November 1774. North's ministry pushed for elections to occur in 1774 (instead of the originally planned 1775) in part due to wanting to avoid having an election coincide with increasing tensions in the American colonies.

At this period elections did not take place at the same time in every constituency. The returning officer in each county or parliamentary borough fixed the precise date (see husting for details of the conduct of the elections).

== Results ==

=== Seats summary ===
Parliamentary seats
Tory	61.4%
Rockinghamite	38.5%

== See also ==
- List of parliaments of Great Britain
- List of MPs elected in the 1774 British general election
