= 1780 British general election =

Election in Great Britain

- 6 September – 18 October 1780

All 558 seats in the House of Commons 280 seats needed for a majority
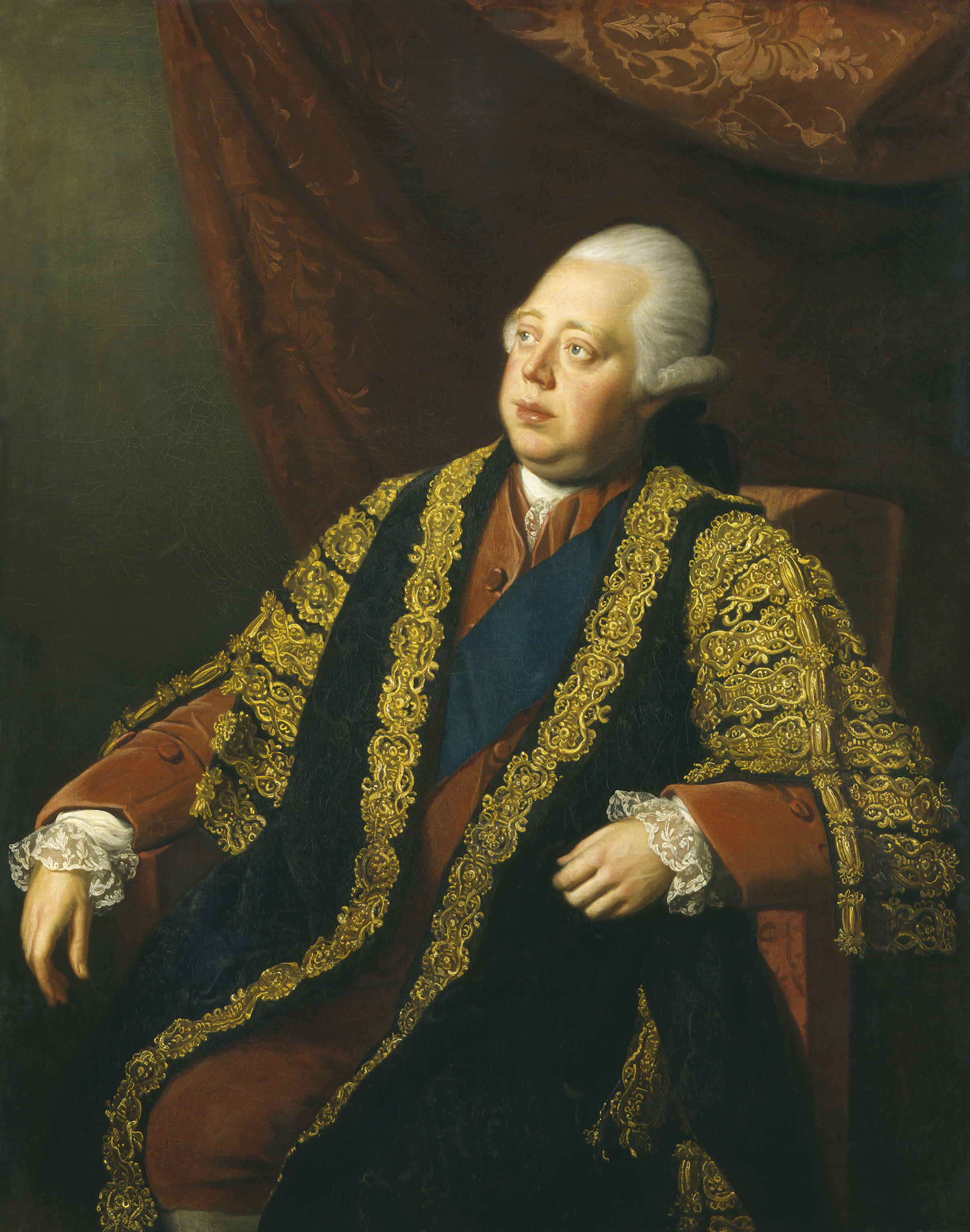

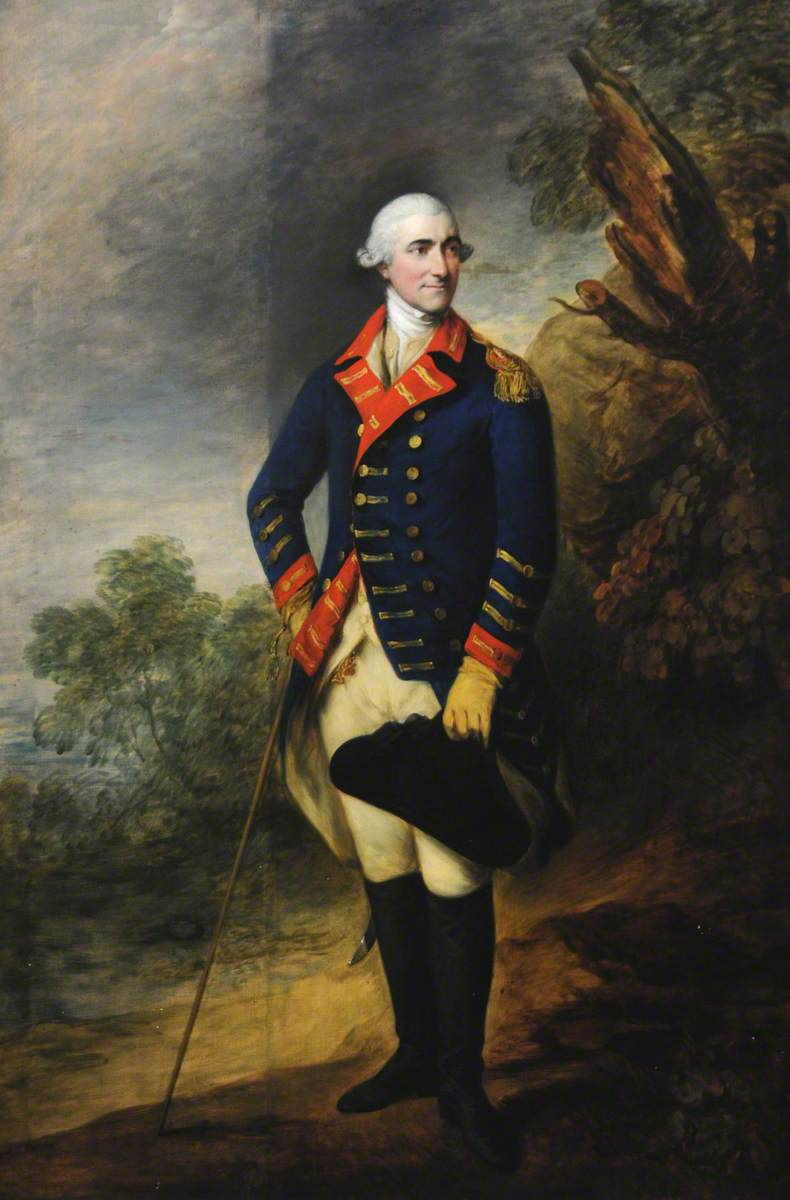
	First party	Second party
Leader	Lord North	Henry Seymour Conway
Party	Northite	Rockinghamite
Leader's seat	Banbury	Thetford
Seats won	260	254
Seat change	▼83	▲39
- Composition of the House of Commons after the election
Prime Minister before election
Lord North
Northite
Prime Minister after
election
Lord North
Northite

The 1780 British general election returned members to serve in the House of Commons of the 15th Parliament of Great Britain to be summoned after the merger of the Parliament of England and the Parliament of Scotland in 1707. The election was held during the American War of Independence and returned Lord North to form a new government with a small and rocky majority. The opposition consisted largely of the Rockingham Whigs, the Whig faction led by the Marquess of Rockingham. North's opponents referred to his supporters as Tories, but no Tory party existed at the time and his supporters rejected the label.

== Summary of the constituencies ==
See 1796 British general election for details. The constituencies used were the same throughout the existence of the Parliament of Great Britain.

== Dates of election ==
The general election was held between 6 September 1780 and 18 October 1780.

At this period elections did not take place at the same time in every constituency. The returning officer in each county or parliamentary borough fixed the precise date (see hustings for details of the conduct of the elections).

== Results ==

=== Seats summary ===
Parliamentary seats
Northite	50.6%
Rockinghamite	49.4%

== See also ==
- List of parliaments of Great Britain
- List of MPs elected in the British general election, 1780
