= Baron Bayning =

Barony in the Peerage of Great Britain

Barony of Bayning
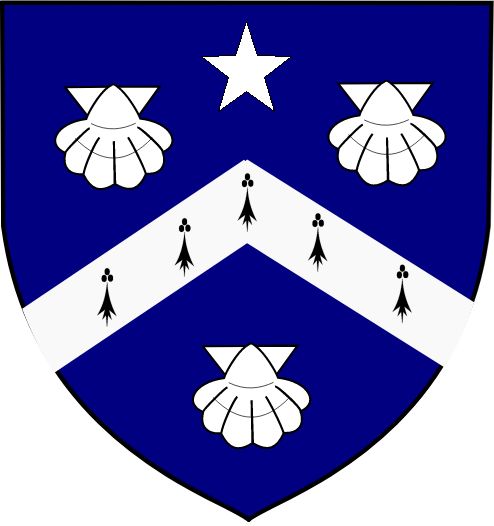
- Arms: Azure a Chevron Ermine between three Escallops Argent a Mullet for difference. Crest: A Buck statant Sable attired Or charged on the body with a Mullet Argent for difference. Supporters: Dexter: A Buck Sable attired collared and lined Or the Collar charged with three Mullets Azure; Sinister: A Leopard Argent pellettée ducally gorged and lined Or therefrom a Shield pendent Argent charged with two Bars Sable thereon four Escallops Gold (Bayning).
- Creation date: 20 October 1797
- Created by: George III
- Peerage: Peerage of Great Britain
- First holder: Charles Townshend, 1st Baron Bayning
- Last holder: Henry William-Powlett, 3rd Baron Bayning
- Remainder to: Heirs male of the first baron's body lawfully begotten
- Extinction date: 5 August 1866
- Seats: Honingham Hall, Honingham, Norfolk
- Motto: Stare Super Vias Antiquas ("To stand firm on the old ways")

Baron Bayning, of Foxley in the County of Berkshire, was a title in the Peerage of Great Britain.

It was created in 1797 for the politician Charles Townshend. He was the son of William Townshend, third son of Charles Townshend, 2nd Viscount Townshend (from whom the Marquesses Townshend descend) and the cousin of Thomas Townshend, 1st Viscount Sydney. Townshend descended through his mother from Anne Murray, Viscountess Bayning, and Paul Bayning, 1st Viscount Bayning, hence his choice of title. He was succeeded by his eldest son, the second Baron. He represented Truro in Parliament. In 1821, he assumed by Royal licence the surname of Powlett in lieu of Townshend. He died unmarried and was succeeded by his younger brother, the third Baron. He died without surviving male issue and the barony became extinct on his death in 1866.

== Barons Bayning (1797) ==
- Charles Townshend, 1st Baron Bayning (1728–1810)
- Charles Frederick Powlett, 2nd Baron Bayning (1785–1823)
- Henry William-Powlett, 3rd Baron Bayning (1797–1866)
  - Charles William Powlett (1844–1864)

== See also ==
- Marquess Townshend
- Viscount Sydney
- Viscount Bayning
