= Eric Teichman =

British diplomat

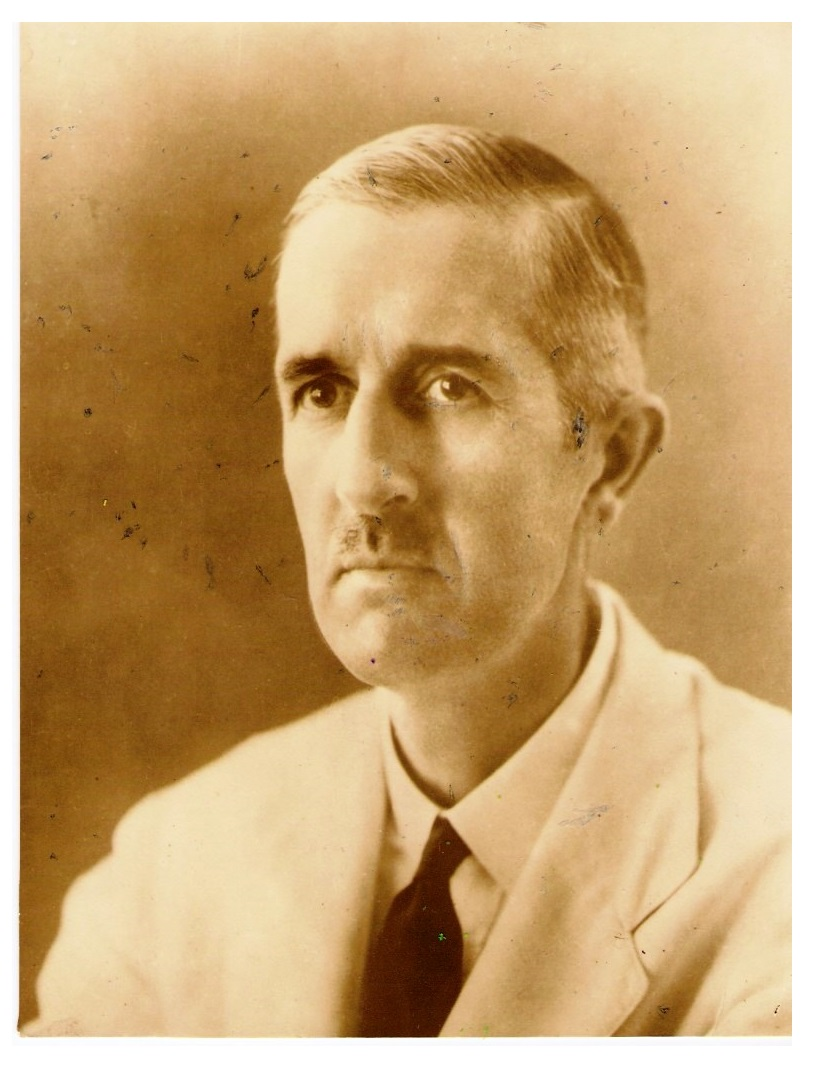
Eric Teichman

Sir Eric Teichman GCMG CIE (born Erik Teichmann; 16 January 1884 – 3 December 1944 in Norfolk, England) was a British diplomat, orientalist, travel writer and photographer.

== Personal life ==
He was a son of Emil Teichmann and Mary Lydia Schroeter, and younger brother of Max Teichmann (1876–1963) and Oskar Teichman (1880–1959), both of whom were born in Eltham. Eric Teichman was educated at Gonville and Caius College, Cambridge. At the time of his death, he had been serving as adviser to the British Embassy at Chongqing.

In 1924 he was appointed Chinese Secretary at His Majesty's Legation at Peking.

== Travels ==
Teichman has been described as "one of British diplomacy's dashing characters, [a] flamboyantly enigmatic explorer-cum-special agent. He went on a number of "special missions" and "fact-finding journeys" throughout Central Asia, as early as before World War I. In 1935 he travelled by truck across the Tarim Basin to Kashgar, and there by pony and on foot across the Pamir and Karakoram ranges to Gilgit, and then to New Delhi. In 1943 he began his final foreign journey from Chongqing. After caravanning as far as Lanzhou, his truck continued along the outer Silk Road, across the Tarim basin, and over the Pamir Mountains to New Delhi. From there he flew back to England, where a few days later, at the age of 60, he was killed.

== Murder ==
On 3 December 1944, whilst at home at Honingham Hall, his estate in Norfolk, England, Teichman heard the sound of gunfire nearby. He went out to confront two poachers (Private George E. Smith of Pittsburgh and Private Leonard S. Wijpacha of Detroit) who were trespassing in the grounds of his estate. Both intruders were American soldiers based at a nearby USAAF airfield and each was armed with an M1 carbine. Teichman was killed during the confrontation, receiving a fatal gunshot wound to the head.

On December 4, all of the soldiers in Smith and Wijpacha's section were ordered to turn in their arms as part of the investigation. Casts of footprints left by the two perpetrators were also made. Wijpacha was questioned by his superiors on 6 December and confronted with this evidence, at which point he confessed. Smith was arrested the next day and admitted to shooting Teichman.

Private Smith (army serial number: 33288266) was given a psychological examination in January 1945, subsequently court-martialled at RAF Attlebridge with a conviction of murder. He was executed by hanging on the gallows at HMP Shepton Mallet on 8 May 1945 (i.e. VE Day), despite appeals for clemency, including from Lady Ellen Teichman. His companion, Private Wijpacha was charged with being an accessory to murder, but was not sentenced to death. Smith's remains are buried in grave 52, row 3 in Oise-Aisne American Cemetery Plot E, France.

Teichman was buried in the churchyard of St Andrew's Church, Honingham. His grave is in the corner plot, directly in line with the now-demolished Honingham Hall. His widow was buried in the same grave in 1969.

== Honours ==
Teichman was appointed a Companion of the Order of the Indian Empire (CIE) in the 1919 Birthday Honours.

He was appointed a Companion of the Order of St Michael and St George (CMG) in the 1927 Birthday Honours, promoted to Knight Commander of the Order (KCMG) in the 1933 New Year Honours, and again to Knight Grand Cross of the Order (GCMG) in the 1944 Birthday Honours.

== Literary works ==
- Teichman, Eric. 1916. "Routes in Kan-su". The Geographical Journal. Wiley. 48 (6): 473–79. doi:10.2307/1779817.
- Travels of a Consular Officer in North-West China: With Original Maps of Shensi and Kansu and Illustrated by Photographs Taken by the Author, 1921.
- Travels of a Consular Officer in Eastern Tibet: Together with a History of the Relations between China, Tibet and India, 1922.
- Journey to Turkistan, 1937.
- Affairs of China: A Survey of the Recent History and Present Circumstances of the Republic of China, 1938.

== Sources ==
- Winchester, Simon The Man Who Loved China: The Fantastic Story of the Eccentric Scientist Who Unlocked the Mysteries of the Middle Kingdom (Joseph Needham), HarperCollins, 2008. ISBN 978-0060884611
