= Charles Powlett, 2nd Baron Bayning =

British peer and Tory Member of Parliament

Charles Powlett

2nd Baron Bayning
- In office 1810–1823
- Succeeded by: Henry Powlett, 3rd Baron Bayning

Member of the British Parliament for Truro
- In office 1808–1810

Personal details
- Born: 26 September 1785
- Died: 2 August 1823 (aged 37)
- Parents: Charles Townshend, 1st Baron Bayning (father); Annabella Smith-Powlett (mother)

Charles Frederick Powlett, 2nd Baron Bayning (26 September 1785 – 2 August 1823), known as the Honourable Charles Townshend from 1797 to 1810, was a British peer and Tory Member of Parliament.

Bayning was the eldest son of Charles Townshend, 1st Baron Bayning, son of William Townshend and Henrietta Powlett. His mother was Annabella Smith-Powlett, daughter of Reverend Richard Smith and Annabella Powlett. He was educated at Trinity College, Cambridge. In 1808, Bayning was elected to the House of Commons for Truro, a seat he held until 1810, when he succeeded his father in the barony and entered the House of Lords. In 1821, he assumed by Royal Licence the surname of Powlett in lieu of Townshend. He lived at Honingham Hall in Norfolk.

Lord Bayning died in August 1823, aged 37. He never married and was succeeded in the barony by his younger brother Henry.

== See also ==
- Marquess Townshend

== Notes ==
Parliament of the United Kingdom
Preceded by John Lemon; Edward Boscawen	Member of Parliament for Truro; 1808–1810; With: John Lemon	Succeeded by John Lemon; William John Bankes
Peerage of Great Britain
Preceded by Charles Townshend	Baron Bayning; 1810–1823	Succeeded by Henry William Powlett
