= Thomas Richardson (judge) =

English politician and judge (1569–1635)

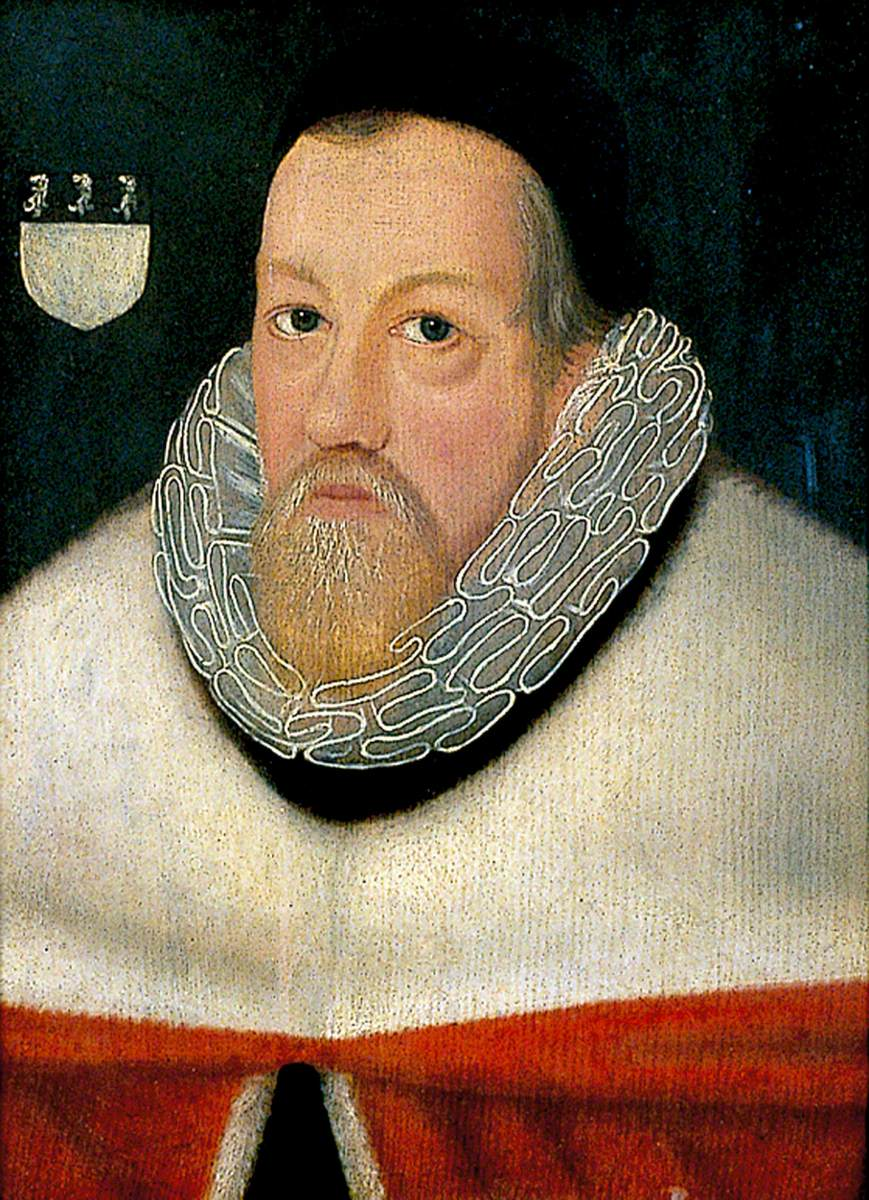
Sir Thomas Richardson, Norwich Civic Portrait Collection. Arms: Argent, on a chief sable three lion's heads erased of the first

Sir Thomas Richardson (1569 – 4 February 1635) of Honingham in Norfolk, was an English judge and politician who sat in the House of Commons from 1621 to 1622. He was Speaker of the House of Commons for this parliament. He was later Chief Justice of the Common Pleas and Chief Justice of the King's Bench.

== Background and early life ==
Richardson was born at Hardwick, Depwade Hundred, Norfolk, and was baptised there on 3 July 1569, the son of William Richardson whose family were said to be descended from the younger son of a Norman family, John, who moved to County Durham in about 1100. Other branches of the family included the Richardsons of the Briary in County Durham, and the Richardsons of Glanbrydan Park and Pantygwydr, Wales. However, the History of Parliament biography of his grandson states that he was "of Norfolk peasant stock". The coat of arms he used (Argent, on a chief sable three lion's heads erased of the first) was certainly that of the ancient gentry family of Richardson, of many branches.

He was educated at Norwich School, and matriculated at Christ's College, Cambridge in June 1584.

On 5 March 1587, he was admitted a student at Lincoln's Inn, where he was called to the bar on 28 January 1595. In about 1600 he purchased the estate of Honingham in Norfolk, which he made his seat.

In 1605 he was deputy steward to the dean and chapter of Norwich, around which time he built Honingham Hall. He was subsequently recorder of Bury St. Edmunds and then Norwich. In 1614, he was Lent Reader at Lincoln's Inn, and on 13 October of the same year became serjeant-at-law. At about the same time he was made chancellor to the queen.

== Speaker of the House of Commons ==
In 1621, Richardson was elected Member of Parliament for St Albans. When Parliament met on 30 January 1621, he was proposed Speaker of the House of Commons, having been prospectively selected by Sir Francis Bacon on Richardson's election. Tradition dictated a convention for protesting such proposals, however in this instance Richardson "seeing no excuse would serve his turn, he wept downright".

On 25 March 1621, he was knighted at Whitehall when he brought King James congratulations of the commons upon the recent censure of Sir Giles Mompesson. In the chair, he proved a veritable King Log and his term of office was marked by the degradation of Bacon. He was not re-elected to parliament in the next election.

== Judicial advancement ==
On 20 February 1625, Richardson was made king's serjeant. On 28 November 1626, he succeeded Sir Henry Hobart as Chief Justice of the Common Pleas, after a vacancy of nearly a year. His advancement was said to have cost him £7,000 and his second marriage (see infra). He judged on 13 November 1628, that it was illegal to use the rack to elicit confession from Felton, the murderer of Duke of Buckingham. His opinion had the concurrence of his colleagues and marks a significant point in the history of English criminal jurisprudence. In the following December he presided at the trial of three of the Jesuits arrested in Clerkenwell, and secured the acquittal of two of them by requiring proof, which was not forthcoming, of their orders.

In the same year he took part in the careful review of the law of constructive treason This arose from the case of Hugh Pine who was charged with that crime for speaking words that were derogatory to the king's majesty. The result of Richardsons's review was to limit the offence to cases of imagining the king's death. He concurred in the guarded and somewhat evasive opinion on the extent of privilege of parliament which the king elicited from the judges after the turbulent scenes which preceded the dissolution of parliament on 4 March 1629. He was as lenient as he could be when he imposed a fine of £500 without imprisonment in the case of Richard Chambers, and his agreement with harsh sentences passed upon Alexander Leighton and William Prynne may have been dictated by timidity, and there contrast strongly with the tenderness which he showed Henry Sherfield, the iconoclastic bencher of Lincoln's Inn.

== Chief Justice of the King’s Bench ==
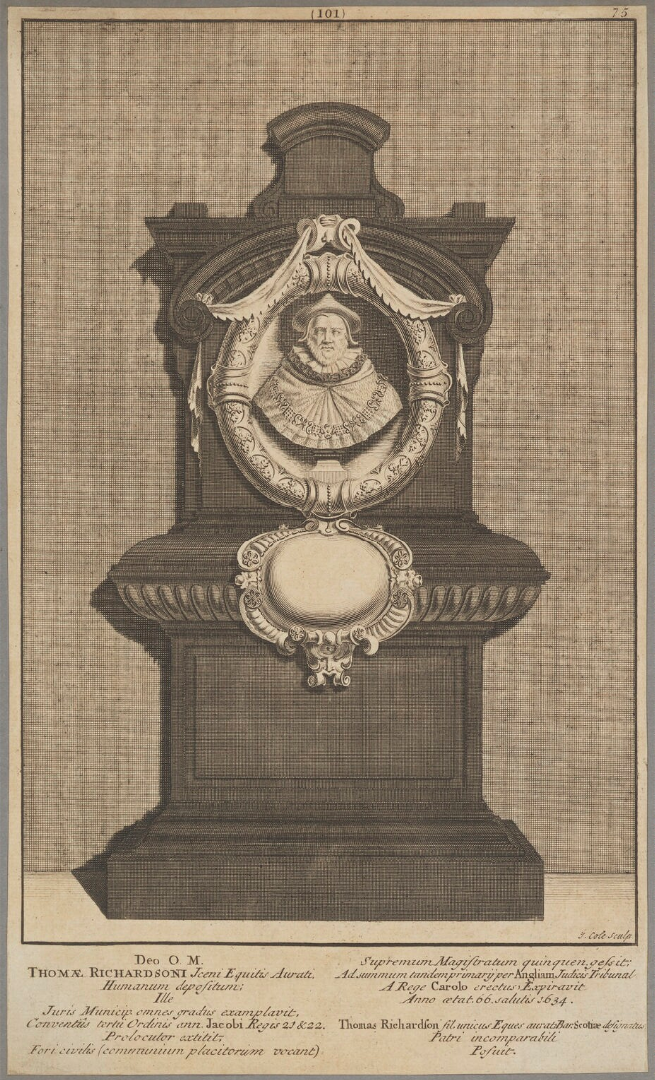
Memorial to Sir Thomas Richardson, Westminster Abbey.

Richardson was advanced to the chief justiceship of the Common Pleas on 24 October 1626. He was not a puritan but in Lent 1632 he made and order, at the instance of the Somerset magistrates, for suppressing the 'wakes' or Sunday revels, which were a fertile source of crime in the county.

He directed the order to be read in church and this brought him into conflict with Laud, who sent for him and told him it was the king's pleasure he should rescind the order. Richardson ignored this instruction until the king himself repeated it. He then, at the ensuing summer Assizes (1633), laid the matter fairly before the justices and grand jury, professing his inability to comply with the royal mandate on the ground that the order had been made by the joint consent of the whole bench, and was in fact a mere confirmation and enlargement of similar orders made in the county since the time of Queen Elizabeth, all which he substantiated from the county records. This caused him to be cited before the council, reprimanded, and transferred to the Essex circuit. 'I am like,' he muttered as he left the council board, 'to be choked with the archbishop's lawn sleeves.'

== Death ==
Richardson died at his house in Chancery Lane on 4 February 1635. He was buried in the South Choir aisle of Westminster Abbey. Near his grave is a bronze bust by Hubert Le Sueur, which was commissioned by his son, Thomas.

== Judicial reputation ==
Richardson was a capable lawyer and a weak man, much addicted to flouts and jeers. 'Let him have the Book of Martyrs' he said, when the question whether Prynne should be allowed the use of books was before the court; 'for the puritans do account him a martyr.' He could also make a caustic jest at his own expense. 'You see now’ he dryly remarked, as he avoided a missile aimed at him by a condemned felon by stooping low, 'if I had been an upright judge I had been slain.' He possessed some polite learning, which caused John Taylor, the water poet, to dedicate to him one of the impressions of his Superbiae Flagellum (1621).

== Marriages and issue ==
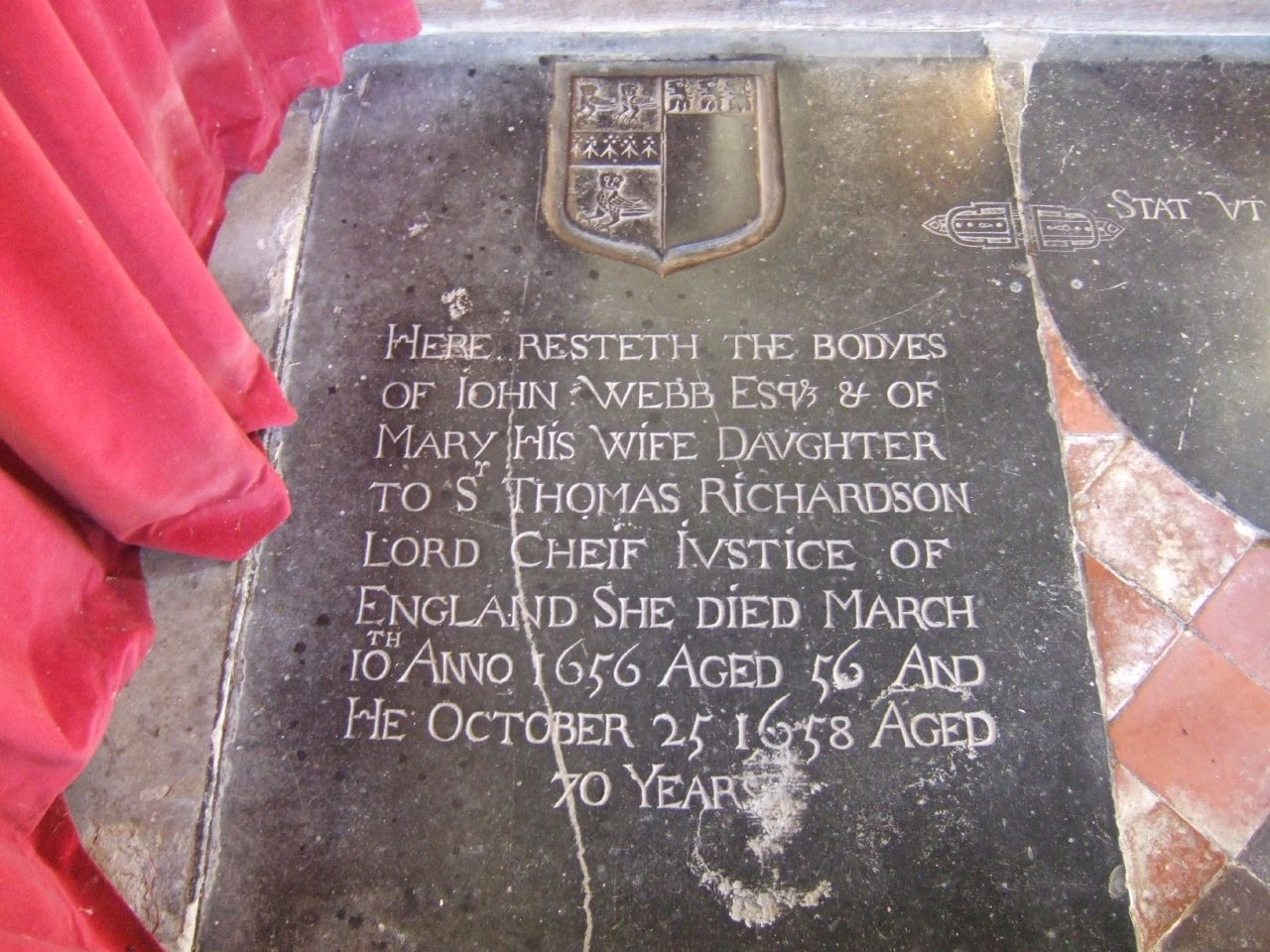
Ledger stone to Mary Richardson (1600–1656; a daughter of Sir Thomas Richardson) and her husband, John Webb (1588–1658). Arms of Webb impaling Richardson. Breckles Church, Norfolk

Richardson married twice:

- Firstly to Ursula Southwell (d.1624), the third daughter of John Southwell of Barham Hall in Suffolk. She was buried at St. Andrew's, Holborn, on 13 June 1624. By Ursula Southwell, he had twelve children, including:
  - Sir Thomas Richardson (d. 12 March 1645), K.B., Master of Cramond, who by special remainder became the heir apparent to the Scottish title of his step-mother Elizabeth, 1st Baroness Cramond (d.1651), but predeceased her. He married firstly Elizabeth Hewett, a daughter of Sir William Hewett of Pishiobury, Sawbridgeworth, Hertfordshire. The title was inherited by his son Thomas Richardson, 2nd Lord Cramond (1627–74), of Honingham. The title became extinct in 1735 on the death, without issue, of William Richardson, 5th Lord Cramond.
  - Mary Richardson (1600 – 10 March 1656/7) who married John Webb (1588 – 25 October 1658) of Breckles in Norfolk. The couple's inscribed ledger stone survives in Breckles Church.
  - Elizabeth Richardson (1607 – 13 July 1655), 3rd daughter, who married Robert Wood (4 August 1601 – 31 December 1680) of Braconash, the grandson of Sir Robert Wood of Norwich.
- Secondly, at St Giles in the Fields, Middlesex, on 14 December 1626, he married Elizabeth Beaumont (d.1651), widow of Sir John Ashburnham and a daughter of Sir Thomas Beaumont of Stoughton, Leicestershire. She was the maternal second cousin once removed of George Villiers, 1st Duke of Buckingham. Without issue. On 28 February 1629, Elizabeth was created Lady Cramond in the peerage of Scotland, for life, with special remainder to her stepson Sir Thomas Richardson, KB, who died in her lifetime on 12 March 1645, and thus his son Thomas Richardson succeeded to the peerage on her death in April 1651. The title became extinct by the death, without issue, of William Richardson, 5th Lord Cramond, in 1735.

== Bibliography ==
- Harries, R.; Cattermole, P.; Mackintosh, P. (1991). A History of Norwich School: King Edward VI's Grammar School at Norwich. Norwich: Friends of Norwich School. ISBN 978-0-9518561-1-6.

Parliament of England
Preceded by Thomas Perient; Henry Finch	Member of Parliament for St Albans; 1620–1622; With: Robert Shute 1620–1621; Henry Meautys 1621–1622	Succeeded by Sir Arthur Capell; Sir John Luke
Political offices
Preceded by Sir Randolph Crewe	Speaker of the House of Commons; 1621–1622	Succeeded by Sir Thomas Crewe
Legal offices
Preceded by Sir Henry Hobart	Chief Justice of the Common Pleas; 1626–1631	Succeeded by Sir Robert Heath
Preceded by Sir Nicholas Hyde	Lord Chief Justice; 1631–1635	Succeeded by Sir John Brampston
