= Fox–North coalition =

Coalition government in Great Britain 1783

- April–December 1783
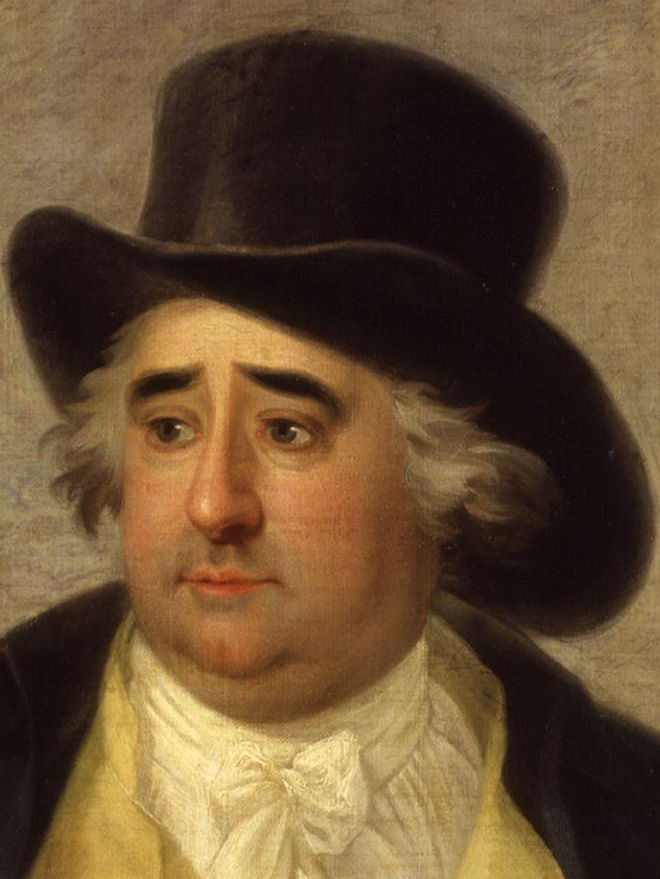
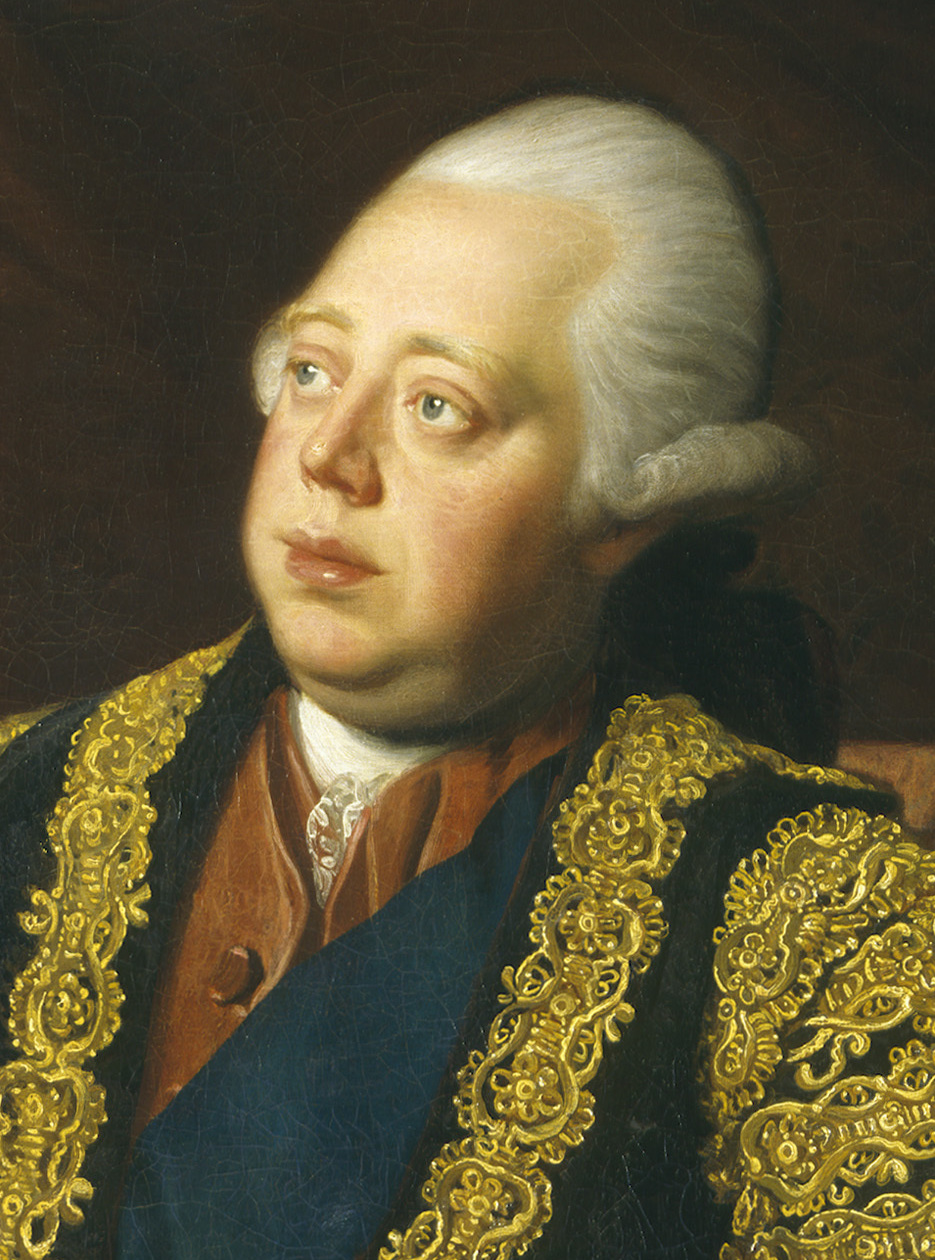
- Fox (left) and North (right)
- Date formed: 2 April 1783
- Date dissolved: 18 December 1783

People and organisations
- Monarch: George III
- Prime Minister: William Cavendish-Bentinck, 3rd Duke of Portland
- Secretaries of State: Charles James Fox; Frederick North, Lord North
- Total no. of members: 15 appointments
- Member parties: Foxites; Northites
- Status in legislature: Majority (coalition)
- Opposition party: Pittites
- Opposition leaders: William Pitt the Younger

History
- Legislature term: 15th GB Parliament
- Predecessor: Shelburne ministry
- Successor: First Pitt ministry

The Fox–North coalition was a government in Great Britain that held office during 1783. As the name suggests, the ministry was a coalition of the groups supporting Charles James Fox and Lord North. It was headed by William Cavendish-Bentinck, 3rd Duke of Portland, who became Prime Minister on 2 April 1783.

== History ==
Fox was a Whig by background, and North came from the nominal Tory Party; however, both had fallen out with the government of Lord Shelburne. They combined their forces in the House of Commons to throw out Shelburne's ministry and then form a government of their own.

King George III despised the government, and Fox in particular, but found that no other ministry could be formed at this stage despite several offers to William Pitt the Younger. Consequently, the King declined to provide the government with the normal tools of patronage, and it was forced to look elsewhere.

The Treaty of Paris was signed during this government on 3 September 1783, formally ending the American Revolutionary War. The government also came under strain when, from the opposition, Pitt introduced a proposal for electoral reform to tackle bribery and rotten boroughs. The proposal did not pass, but caused tensions within the coalition which contained both proponents and opponents of political reform.

The British East India Company was in trouble; Fox proposed nationalising it, thus providing the government with a new source of appointments so that it could reward and maintain support. The East India Bill was introduced and passed in the Commons, but the King remained deeply opposed. He informed the House of Lords that he would regard any peer who voted for the bill as his enemy. The bill was defeated on 17 December 1783 and the King immediately dismissed the coalition. It was succeeded by a government formed by William Pitt the Younger.

After being dismissed, Fox and North tried to force Pitt from power through defeat in the House of Commons, but he refused to resign. The response of opinion in the country, evidenced by petitions, resolutions of borough corporations and the actions of the London mobs, showed strong opposition to the coalition and support for Pitt. In March 1784 a general election was called in which Pitt's government made massive gains, especially in constituencies decided by popular votes.

== Principal members of the government ==
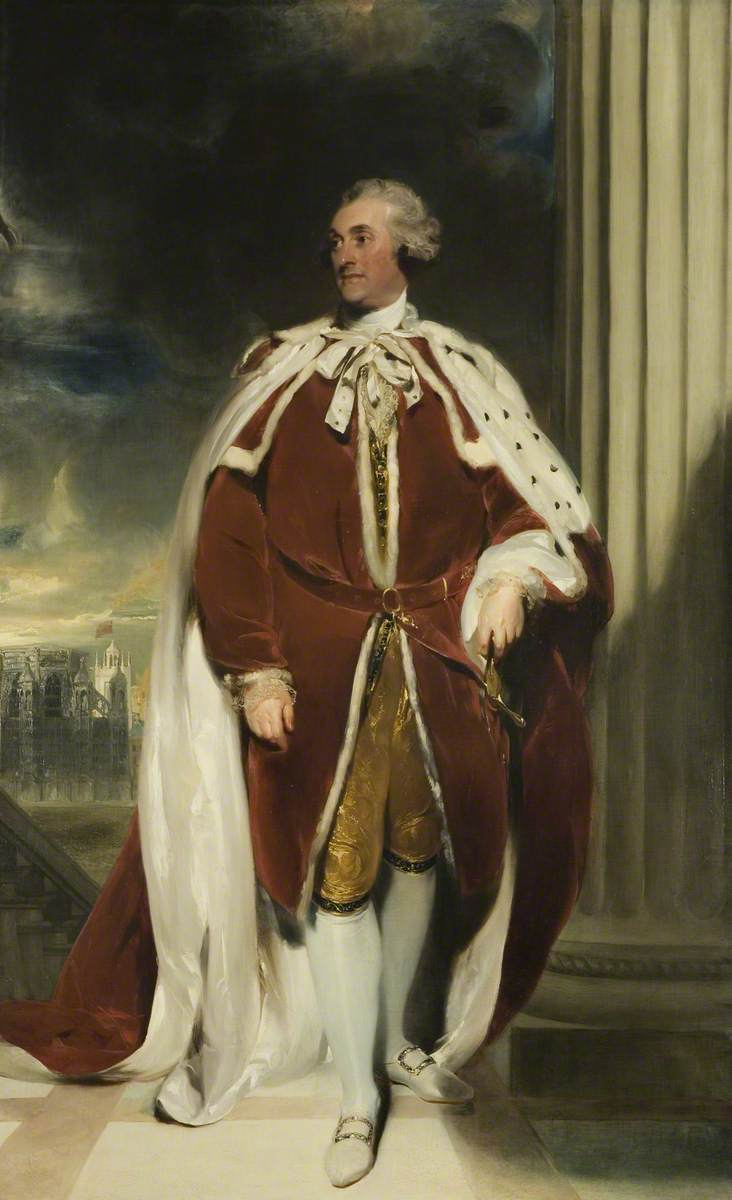
Portrait of the Duke of Portland by Thomas Lawrence, 1792

Office	Name	Date
First Lord of the Treasury	William Cavendish-Bentinck, 3rd Duke of Portland	2 April 1783
Secretary of State for the Home Department	Frederick North, Lord North	2 April 1783
Secretary of State for Foreign Affairs	Charles James Fox	2 April 1783
Lord President of the Council	David Murray, Viscount Stormont	2 April 1783
Lord Chancellor	In Commission	9 April 1783
Lord Privy Seal	Frederick Howard, 5th Earl of Carlisle	2 April 1783
First Lord of the Admiralty	Augustus Keppel, 1st Viscount Keppel	8 April 1783
Chancellor of the Exchequer	Lord John Cavendish	5 April 1783
Master-General of the Ordnance	George Townshend, 4th Viscount Townshend	28 April 1783
First Lord of Trade	Thomas Robinson, 2nd Baron Grantham	continued in office
Chancellor of the Duchy of Lancaster	John Dunning, 1st Baron Ashburton	continued in office
Chancellor of the Duchy of Lancaster	Edward Smith-Stanley, 12th Earl of Derby	29 April 1783
Treasurer of the Navy	Charles Townshend	11 April 1783
Secretary at War	Richard FitzPatrick	11 April 1783
Paymaster of the Forces	Edmund Burke	8 April 1783
Lord Lieutenant of Ireland	Robert Henley, 2nd Earl of Northington	1783

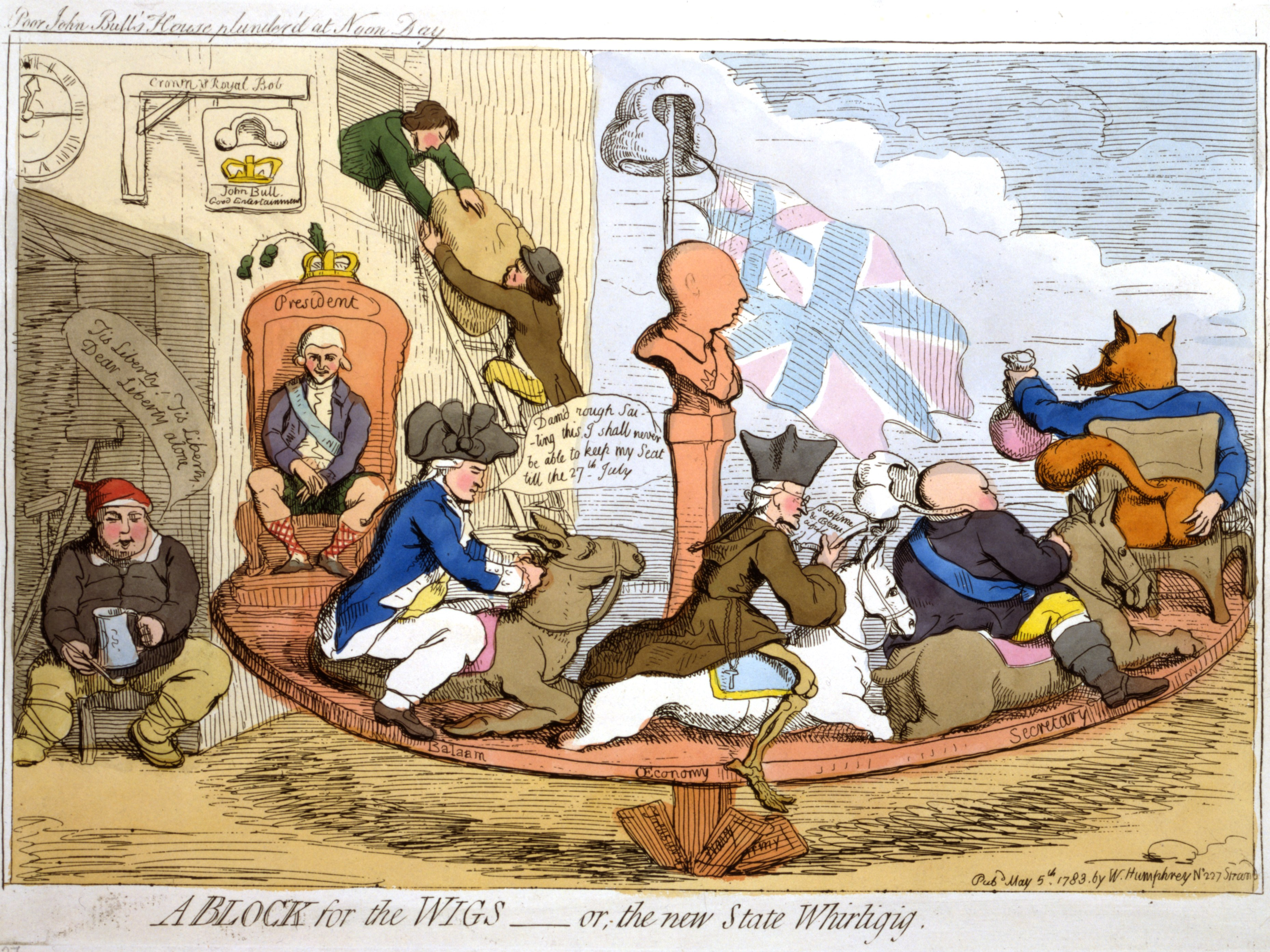
In A Block for the Wigs (1783), James Gillray caricatured the Fox–North coalition. Fox is pictured right; followed by North; and then by Edmund Burke, with a skeleton leg. George III is the blockhead in the centre.

== See also ==
- Cameron–Clegg coalition

== Bibliography ==
- Black, Jeremy (2006). George III: America's Last King. Yale University Press. ISBN 0300117329.
- Pares, Richard (1953). King George III and the Politicians. London. Archived from the original on 20 August 2011 – via Questia.
- Trevelyan, George Otto (1912). George the Third and Charles Fox: The Concluding Part of the American Revolution. Vol. 2 vols. Archived from the original on 20 August 2011 – via Questia. – Online edition v2 Archived 4 June 2011 at the Wayback Machine.
- Watson, J. Steven (1960). The Reign of George III, 1760–1815. – The standard scholarly history online edition Archived 22 August 2011 at the Wayback Machine.

Preceded by Shelburne ministry	Government of Great Britain; 1783	Succeeded by First Pitt ministry
