= Paul Bayning, 1st Viscount Bayning =

English noble (1588–1629)

Paul Bayning, 1st Viscount Bayning of Sudbury in Suffolk (1588 – 29 July 1629), previously known as Sir Paul Bayning and as Baron Bayning, was an English landed gentleman, created a peer in 1628.

== Life ==
Bayning was the son of another Paul Bayning, a merchant of Bentley Parva, in Essex, and of London, by his father's marriage to Susannah Norden, and his baptism was recorded at St Olave's, Southwark, on 28 April 1588. His father served as a Sheriff of London for the year 1593.

As a young man Bayning inherited large estates in Essex and Suffolk. He made his principal seat at Honingham Hall in Norfolk. He financed and organised James Lancaster's expedition to Recife in April 1595.

On an unknown date before 1613 Bayning married Anne, a daughter of Sir Henry Glemham and Lady Anne Sackville, and their surviving children were Paul (born 1616), Anne, Elizabeth, Mary (born 1623), and Cecilia.

On 24 September 1611 King James I created Bayning a baronet, and he served as Sheriff of Essex for 1617-1618. On 27 February 1628 he was created Baron Bayning of Horkesley in Essex, and a year later on 8 March 1628 received the higher title of Viscount Bayning of Sudbury in Suffolk. He died at Mark Lane in the City of London on 29 July 1629, and his large estates were left to his eldest son, also named Paul. In 1630 his widow married Dudley Carleton, 1st Viscount Dorchester.

== Posterity ==
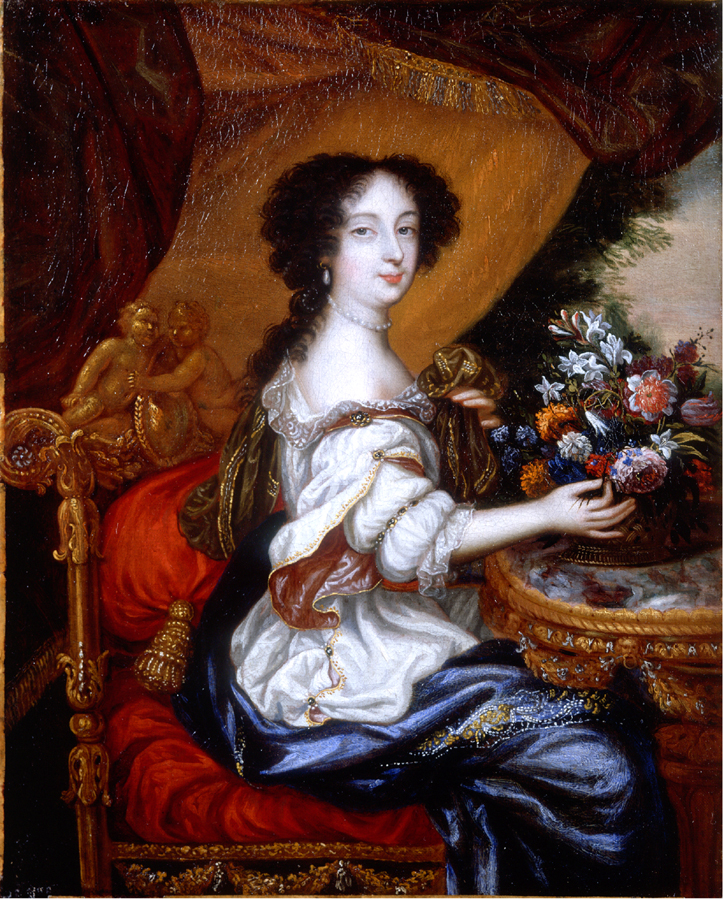
Bayning's granddaughter Barbara Villiers

After Bayning's death, his daughters made advantageous marriages: his eldest daughter, Anne Bayning, married Henry Murray, a Groom of the Bedchamber to King Charles I, and later Sir John Baber; his daughter Cecilia married Henry Pierrepont, 1st Marquess of Dorchester; his daughter Elizabeth married Francis Lennard, 14th Baron Dacre; and his daughter Mary married William Villiers, 2nd Viscount Grandison, and was the mother of Barbara Villiers, Duchess of Cleveland, a mistress of King Charles II.

On the death of the second Viscount Bayning in 1638, the Bayning titles became extinct, while the estates were inherited by Anne Baber. In 1674 she was created Viscountess Bayning for life, and on her death in 1678 that title also became extinct. Her younger sister Elizabeth Dacre was created Countess of Sheppey for life in 1680. In 1797 the great-great-grandson of Viscountess Bayning, Charles Townshend, was created Baron Bayning.

== Notes ==
Peerage of England
New creation	Viscount Bayning; 1628–1629	Succeeded by Paul Bayning
New creation	Baron Bayning; 1628–1629	Succeeded by Paul Bayning
Baronetage of England
New creation	Baronet (of Bentley Parva); 1611–1629	Succeeded by Paul Bayning
