= North ministry =

British premiership of Frederick North from 1770 to 1782

- 1770–1782
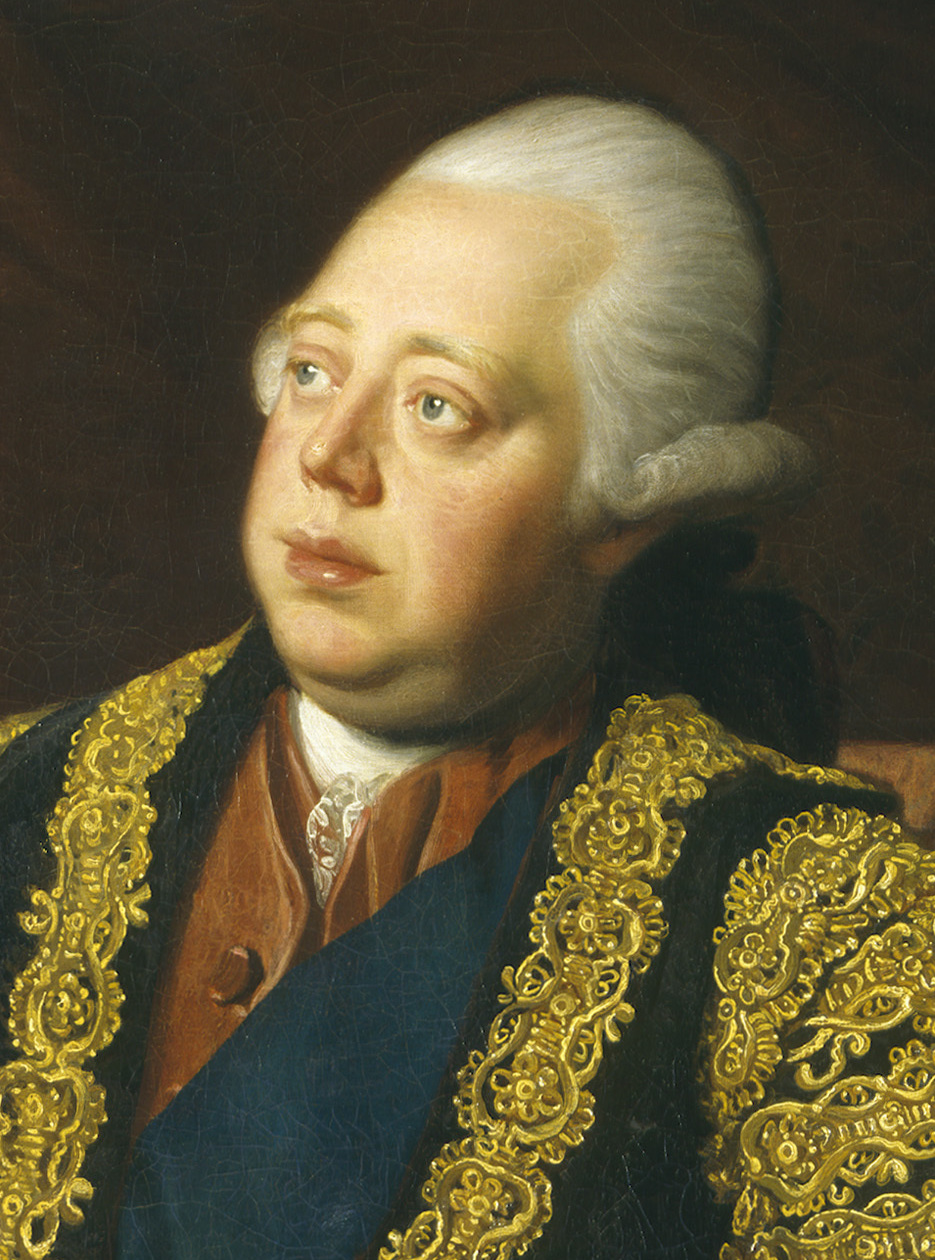
- North by Nathaniel Dance-Holland
- Date formed: 28 January 1770
- Date dissolved: 27 March 1782

People and organisations
- Monarch: George III
- Prime Minister: Frederick North, Lord North
- Total no. of members: 33 appointments
- Member parties: Bedfordites; Grenvillites; Tories
- Status in legislature: Majority (coalition) (1770–1774); Majority (1774–1782)
- Opposition party: Rockingham Whigs

History
- Elections: 1774 general election; 1780 general election
- Legislature terms: 14th GB Parliament; 15th GB Parliament lost a vote of confidence
- Predecessor: Grafton ministry
- Successor: Second Rockingham ministry

Frederick North, Lord North was appointed to lead the government of the Kingdom of Great Britain by King George III from 1770 to 1782. His ministry oversaw the Falklands Crisis of 1770, the 1780 Gordon Riots and the outbreak of the American War of Independence.

== Ministers ==
Portfolio	Minister	Took office	Left office	Party
First Lord of the Treasury; Chancellor of the Exchequer	Frederick North, Lord North (head of ministry)	28 January 1770	27 March 1782	Tory
Lord Chancellor	Henry Bathurst, 2nd Earl Bathurst	23 January 1771	3 June 1778	Tory
Lord Chancellor	Edward Thurlow, 1st Baron Thurlow	3 June 1778	7 April 1783	Tory
Lord President of the Council	Granville Leveson-Gower, 2nd Earl Gower	22 December 1767	24 November 1779	Tory
Lord President of the Council	Henry Bathurst, 2nd Earl Bathurst	24 November 1779	27 March 1782	Tory
Lord Privy Seal	George Montagu-Dunk, 2nd Earl of Halifax	26 February 1770	22 January 1771	Tory
Lord Privy Seal	Henry Howard, 12th Earl of Suffolk	22 January 1771	12 June 1771	Independent
Lord Privy Seal	Augustus FitzRoy, 3rd Duke of Grafton	12 June 1771	4 November 1775	Whig
Lord Privy Seal	William Legge, 2nd Earl of Dartmouth	4 November 1775	27 March 1782	Independent
Lord Steward	William Talbot, 1st Earl Talbot	1761	27 April 1782	Independent
Lord Chamberlain	Francis Seymour-Conway, 1st Earl of Hertford	1766	1782	Independent
Secretary of State for the Southern Department	Thomas Thynne, 3rd Viscount Weymouth	21 October 1768	12 December 1770	Tory
Secretary of State for the Southern Department	William Nassau de Zuylestein, 4th Earl of Rochford	19 December 1770	9 November 1775	Independent
Secretary of State for the Southern Department	Thomas Thynne, 3rd Viscount Weymouth	9 November 1775	24 November 1779	Tory
Secretary of State for the Southern Department	Wills Hill, 1st Earl of Hillsborough	24 November 1779	27 March 1782	Independent
Secretary of State for the Northern Department	William Nassau de Zuylestein, 4th Earl of Rochford	21 October 1768	19 December 1770	Independent
Secretary of State for the Northern Department	John Montagu, 4th Earl of Sandwich	19 December 1770	12 January 1771	Whig
Secretary of State for the Northern Department	George Montagu-Dunk, 2nd Earl of Halifax	22 January 1771	6 June 1771	Tory
Secretary of State for the Northern Department	Henry Howard, 12th Earl of Suffolk	12 June 1771	7 March 1779	Independent
Secretary of State for the Northern Department	David Murray, Viscount Stormont	27 October 1779	27 March 1782	Independent
Secretary of State for the Colonies	Wills Hill, 1st Earl of Hillsborough	27 February 1768	27 August 1772	Independent
Secretary of State for the Colonies	William Legge, 2nd Earl of Dartmouth	27 August 1772	10 November 1775	Independent
Secretary of State for the Colonies	Lord George Germain	10 November 1775	February 1782	Independent
Secretary of State for the Colonies	Welbore Ellis	February 1782	8 March 1782	Independent
Chancellor of the Duchy of Lancaster	James Smith-Stanley	13 December 1762	14 June 1771	Independent
Chancellor of the Duchy of Lancaster	Thomas Villiers, 1st Earl of Clarendon	14 June 1771	17 April 1782	Whig
First Lord of the Admiralty	Sir Edward Hawke	1766	1771	Independent
First Lord of the Admiralty	John Montagu, 4th Earl of Sandwich	1771	1782	Whig
Master-General of the Ordnance	George Townshend, 4th Viscount Townshend	October 1772	March 1782	Independent
Lord Lieutenant of Ireland	George Townshend, 4th Viscount Townshend	19 August 1767	29 October 1772	Independent
Lord Lieutenant of Ireland	Simon Harcourt, 1st Earl Harcourt	29 October 1772	7 December 1776	Independent
Lord Lieutenant of Ireland	John Hobart, 2nd Earl of Buckinghamshire	7 December 1776	29 November 1780	Independent
Lord Lieutenant of Ireland	Frederick Howard, 5th Earl of Carlisle	29 November 1780	8 April 1782	Independent

== Notes ==
Preceded by Grafton ministry	Government of Great Britain; 1770–1782	Succeeded by Second Rockingham ministry
