= Lord Cramond =

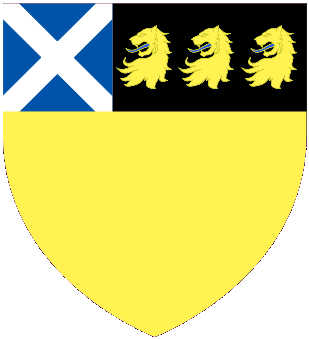
Arms of the Lords Cramond

The title of Lord (of) Cramond was a title in the nobility of Scotland. It was created on 23 February 1628 for Dame Elizabeth Richardson. She was married to Sir Thomas Richardson, the second marriage for both, and had no children together. The remainder for the title was to Sir Thomas's heirs (from his first marriage), rather than to her own children from her first marriage. Thus, Lady Cramond's eldest son John Ashburnham was not eligible to succeed his mother.

On the death of the fifth lord in 1735, it became extinct.

== Lords (and Ladies) (of) Cramond (1628) ==
- Elizabeth Richardson, 1st Lady Cramond (d. 1651)
- Thomas Richardson, 2nd Lord Cramond (1627–1674)
- Henry Richardson, 3rd Lord Cramond (1650–1701)
- William Richardson, 4th Lord Cramond (1654–1719)
- William Richardson, 5th Lord Cramond (1715–1735) (extinct)
