= Honingham Hall =

Country house in Norfolk, England

Coordinates: 52.6687°N 1.1224°E

Honingham Hall was a large country house at Honingham in Norfolk.

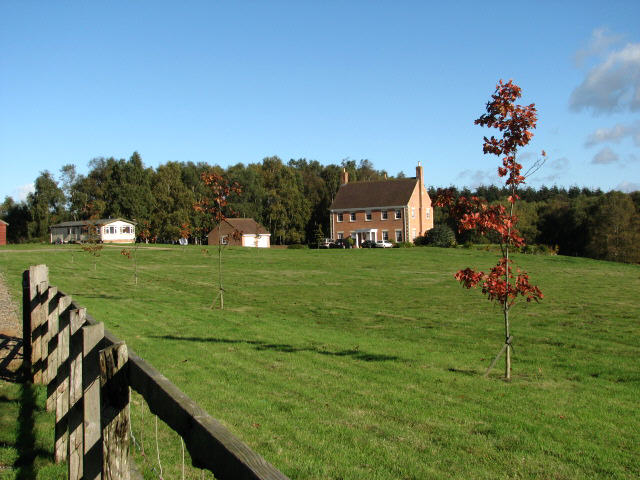
Honingham Park

== History ==
The house was commissioned by Sir Thomas Richardson, Chief Justice of the King’s Bench in 1605. After passing down the Richardson family, it was bought by Richard Baylie, President of St John's College, Oxford, in about 1650 and was then acquired by William Townsend, Member of Parliament for Great Yarmouth in about 1735, before passing down the Townsend family. In 1887, it was inherited by Ailwyn Fellowes, 1st Baron Ailwyn and in 1924 by Ronald Fellowes, 2nd Baron Ailwyn who sold it in 1935. It was then bought by Sir Eric Teichman, a diplomat, who allowed it to become a Barnardo's home in 1940 during World War II. Teichman was murdered in the grounds of the hall by a poacher one night in December 1944. The killer was Private George E. Smith of Pittsburgh who, with Private Leonard S. Wijpacha of Detroit, was trespassing in the grounds of the estate. Both intruders were American soldiers based at a nearby US airfield and each was armed with an M1 carbine. The house closed as a Barnardo's home December 1966 and was subsequently demolished.
