= Charles Townshend, 1st Baron Bayning =

British politician

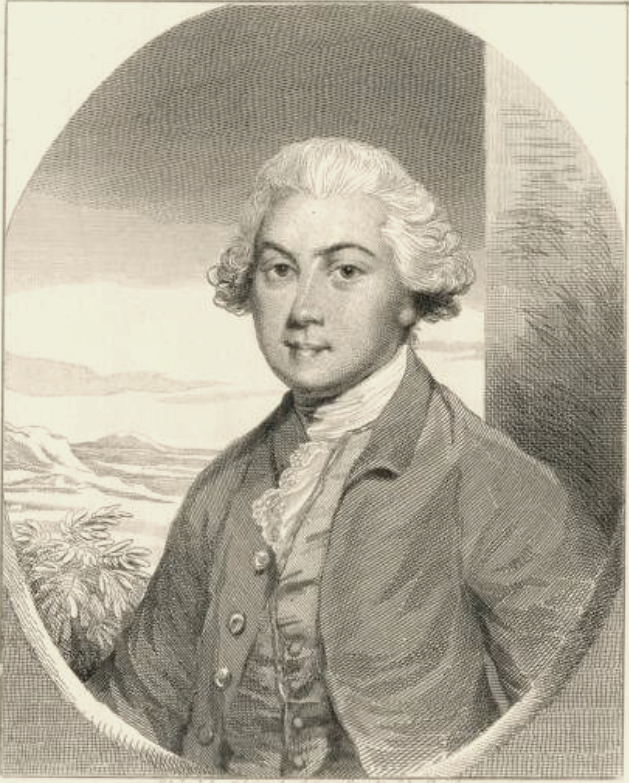
Charles Townshend, 1st Baron Bayning

Charles Townshend, 1st Baron Bayning PC (27 August 1728 – 19 May 1810) was a British politician.

== Background and education ==
Bayning was the only son of William Townshend, third son of Charles Townshend, 2nd Viscount Townshend. George Townshend, 1st Marquess Townshend, Charles Townshend and Thomas Townshend, 1st Viscount Sydney, were his first cousins. His mother was Henrietta Powlett, daughter of Lord William Powlett. On his mother's side he was a female-line great-great-grandson of Anne, Viscountess Bayning, daughter of Paul Bayning, 1st Viscount Bayning. Bayning was educated at Eton and Clare College, Cambridge.

== Political career ==
He was Secretary to the British Embassy in Madrid between 1751 and 1756 and became known as "Spanish Charles" to distinguish him from his first cousin and namesake. In 1756 he was elected to the House of Commons for Great Yarmouth, a seat he held until 1784, and served as a Lord of the Admiralty from 1765 to 1770, as a Lord of the Treasury from 1770 to 1777 and as Joint Vice-Treasurer for Ireland from 1777 to 1782. Between April and December 1783 he was Treasurer of the Navy in the Fox-North Coalition. In 1777 Bayning was admitted to the Privy Council. He returned as Member of Parliament for Great Yarmouth in 1790, and continued to represent this constituency until 1796. The following year he was raised to the peerage as Baron Bayning, of Foxley in the County of Berkshire.

In 1807 he served as High Steward of Great Yarmouth. He lived at Honingham Hall in Norfolk.

== Family ==
Lord Bayning married Annabella Smith-Powlett, daughter of Reverend Richard Smith and Annabella Powlett, in 1777. He died in May 1810, aged 81, and was succeeded in the barony by his eldest son Charles. Lady Bayning died in 1825.

== See also ==
- Marquess Townshend
- Viscount Bayning

== Notes ==
Parliament of Great Britain
Preceded by Sir Edward Walpole; Charles Townshend	Member of Parliament for Great Yarmouth; 1756–1784; With: Sir Edward Walpole 1756–1768; Richard Walpole 1768–1784	Succeeded by Sir John Jervis; Henry Beaufoy
Preceded by Sir John Jervis; Henry Beaufoy	Member of Parliament for Great Yarmouth; 1790–1796; With: Henry Beaufoy 1790–1795; Stephens Howe 1795–1796	Succeeded by Stephens Howe; Lord Charles Townshend
Political offices
Preceded by Henry Dundas	Treasurer of the Navy; 1783	Succeeded by Henry Dundas
Peerage of Great Britain
New creation	Baron Bayning; 1797–1810	Succeeded by Charles Powlett
