= Rockingham Whigs =

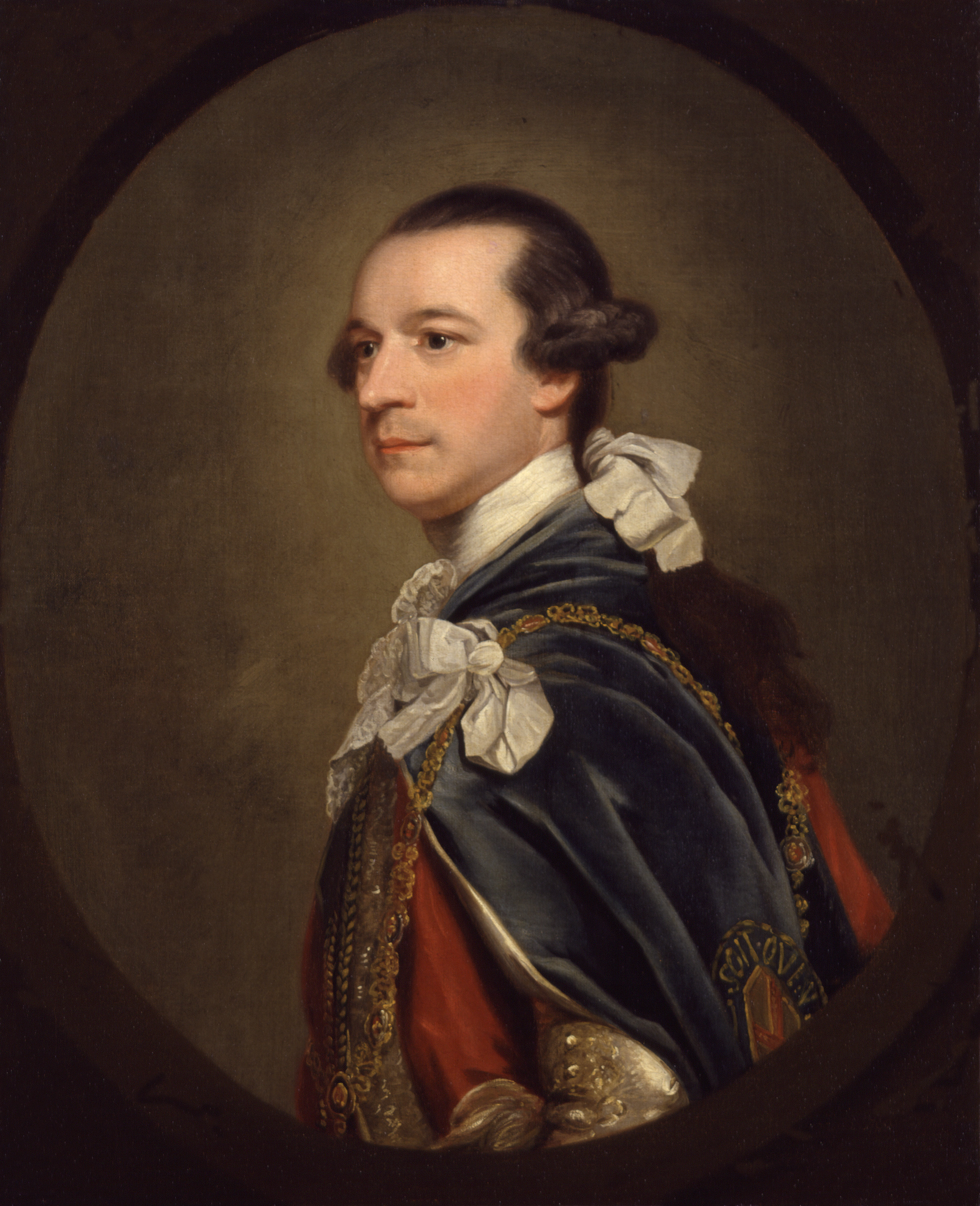
- Leader: Marquess of Rockingham
- Founded: 1765; 261 years ago
- Dissolved: 1784; 242 years ago
- Preceded by: Pittites
- Merged into: Portlandites
- Headquarters: Northamptonshire
- Ideology: Conservatism; Parliamentarism
- Political position: Centre-right
- National affiliation: Whig party

The Rockingham Whigs (or Rockinghamites) in 18th-century British politics were a faction of the Whigs led by Charles Watson-Wentworth, 2nd Marquess of Rockingham, from about 1762 until his death in 1782. The Rockingham Whigs briefly held power from 1765 to 1766 and again in 1782, and otherwise were usually in opposition to the various ministries of the period.

== History ==
The faction came into existence in 1762, following the dismissal of the Duke of Newcastle's government and the dismissal of many of Newcastle's supporters from their posts by his successor, Lord Bute, in the so-called "Massacre of the Pelhamite Innocents".

For many years Newcastle and his late brother Henry Pelham had dominated parliament and government through their mastery of patronage and the "old corruption", to the point where King George II had proved incapable of dispensing with their services even when he desired to. When the new king, George III, came to the throne in 1760, he was determined to reassert royal power and take the patronage mechanism away from Newcastle and his faction. After their fall from power Newcastle and his remaining loyalists came together to oppose Bute and assert what they believed to be Whig principles dating back to the political conflicts of the previous century. The faction was heavily dominated by wealthy aristocrats, and because of Newcastle's advanced age, effective leadership soon came into the hands of the very wealthy young aristocrat the Marquess of Rockingham, who soon gave his name to the group.

Although the Rockingham Whigs were briefly brought into power in 1765, following the fall of the ministry of George Grenville, this ministry was based on an always uneasy relationship with the crown and collapsed a year later.

In fact, the faction showed less interest in holding office than in preventing a reassertion of royal power. They were prepared to unite with reformers of all kinds to preserve the constitutional settlement of 1689. But their essentially aristocratic and oligarchic character prevented them from collaborating with "Country Party" reformers advocating radical or populistic measures. They also opposed the British position which led to the American Revolution and sought reconciliation after it.

The writer and philosopher Edmund Burke, who served as Rockingham's private secretary, was one of the faction's leading spokesmen in the House of Commons.

They did not favor Irish constitutional goals but when out of power they used Irish problems to embarrass the government. During Rockingham's government in 1765–66, his faction was generally hostile to the Irish Patriot Party, but during the administration of Lord North in 1770–82, it supported the Patriots' charges of mismanagement of Irish affairs. In power again in 1782, the Rockinghamites made concessions to the Patriots' demand for Irish legislative independence. They sought and failed to obtain a permanent solution that would have involved British control over external legislation and Irish control over internal affairs. They also failed to implement British party models in Ireland. Rockinghamites Charles James Fox and Burke were actively involved in Irish issues, says Powell, the former opportunistically and the latter with a genuine interest in reform.

In 1782 they joined forces with other members of the Opposition to bring down the North government which had overseen the American War since the beginning, and was blamed for the surrender of the British army at Yorktown. The new government was led by Rockingham and began to seek peace terms, laying the foundations for the Treaty of Paris agreed in 1783. Rockingham's unexpected death in July 1782 led to a split in the new government with some Rockingham Whigs remaining in office under the new government of Lord Shelburne, and others going into opposition led by Charles James Fox and Edmund Burke. After Rockingham's death, the Duke of Portland became the head of the Rockingham Whig party.

== Prominent members ==
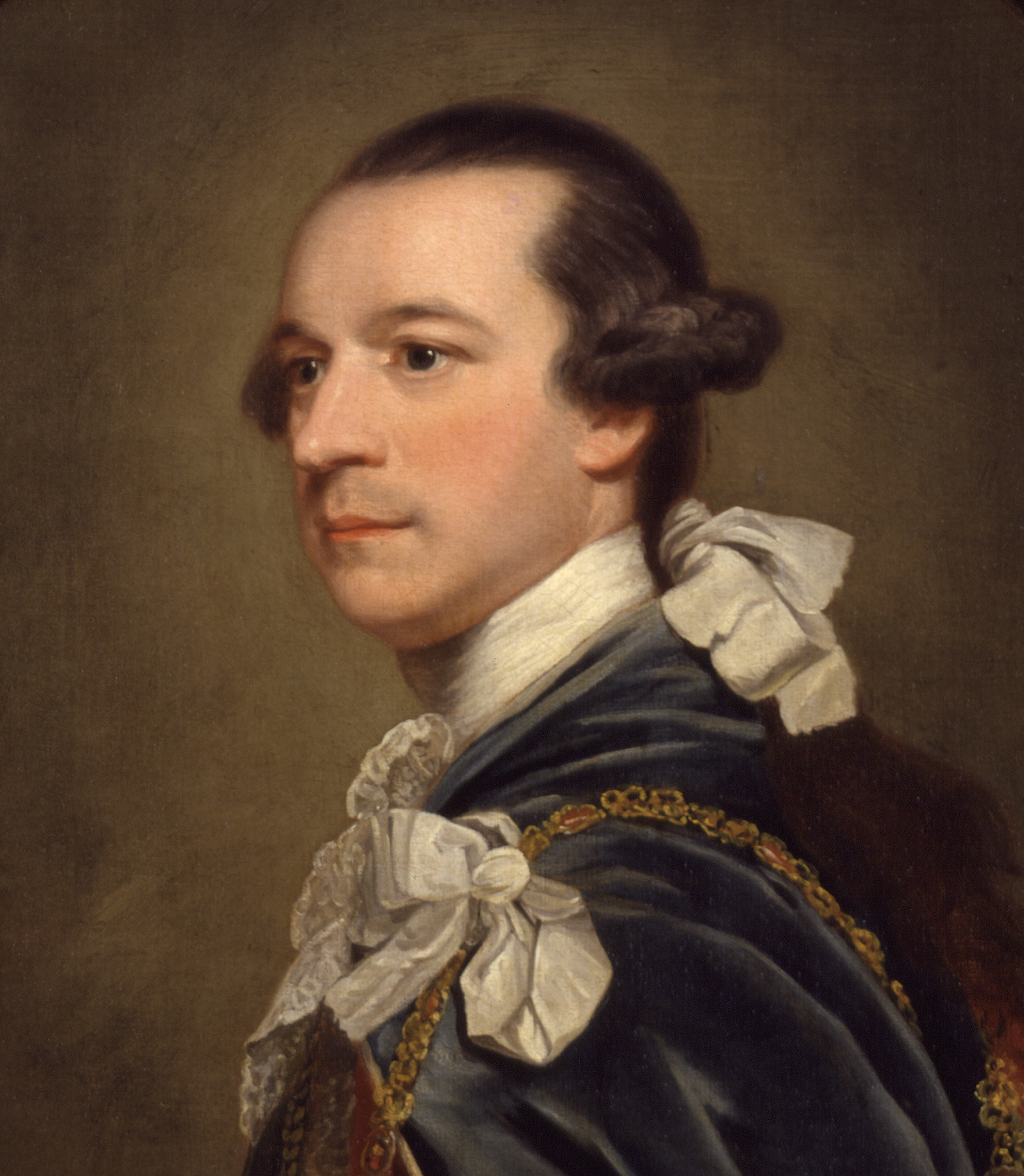
Lord Rockingham, who led the Rockingham Whigs

- Charles Watson-Wentworth, 2nd Marquess of Rockingham
- Thomas Pelham-Holles, 1st Duke of Newcastle
- Augustus FitzRoy, 3rd Duke of Grafton
- Charles Lennox, 3rd Duke of Richmond
- William Cavendish, 4th Duke of Devonshire
- William Cavendish-Bentinck, 3rd Duke of Portland
- George Keppel, 3rd Earl of Albemarle
- William Ponsonby, 2nd Earl of Bessborough
- Philip Yorke, 1st Earl of Hardwicke
- Philip Yorke, 2nd Earl of Hardwicke
- Lord John Cavendish
- Henry Seymour Conway
- William Dowdeswell
- Edmund Burke
- Augustus Keppel
- Charles James Fox
- Charles Yorke
- Sir Charles Saunders

== Electoral performances ==
Election	Leader	Seats	+/–	Position	Government
Split from united Whigs
1768	The Marquess of Rockingham	N/A		2nd	Minority
1774	The Marquess of Rockingham	215 / 558	N/A	2nd	Minority
1780	The Marquess of Rockingham	254 / 558	▲39	2nd	Minority
Succeeded by Pittites

== See also ==
- Peace of Paris (1783)
