= William Townshend (MP) =

British Member of Parliament

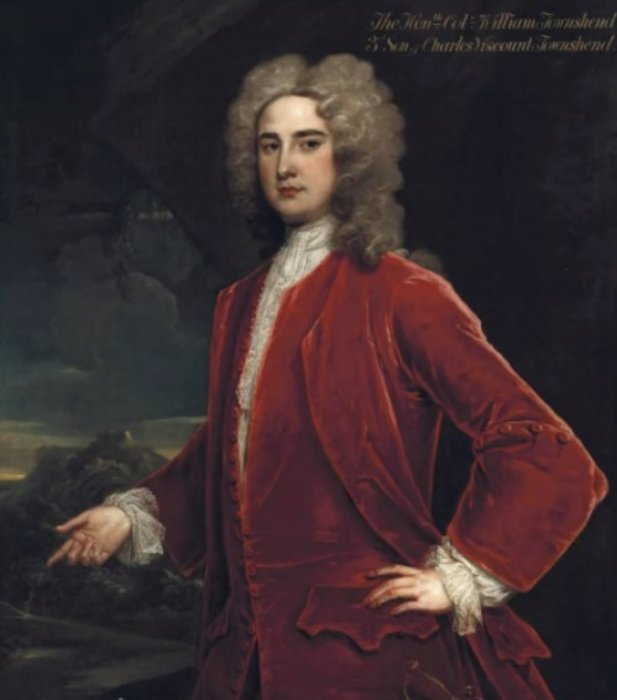

Member of the British Parliament for Great Yarmouth
- In office 1723–1738

Personal details
- Born: 9 June 1702
- Died: 29 January 1738 (aged 35)
- Spouse: Henrietta Powlett (or Paulet) (m. 1725)
- Children: 7, including Charles
- Parents: Charles Townshend, 2nd Viscount Townshend (father); Elizabeth Pelham (mother)

The Honourable William Townshend (9 June 1702 – 29 January 1738) was a British Member of Parliament.

Townshend was the third son of Charles Townshend, 2nd Viscount Townshend, and his first wife the Hon. Elizabeth Pelham. Charles Townshend, 3rd Viscount Townshend, Thomas Townshend and Roger Townshend were his brothers and George Townshend, 1st Marquess Townshend, and Charles Townshend his nephews. He was elected to the House of Commons for Great Yarmouth in 1723, a seat he held until his death. He lived at Honingham Hall in Norfolk.

Townshend married Henrietta, daughter of Lord William Powlett, in May 1725. Their son Charles was created Baron Bayning in 1797. Townshend died in January 1738, aged only 35. His wife died in 1755.

== See also ==
- Marquess Townshend
- Baron Bayning

Parliament of Great Britain
Preceded by Charles Townshend; Horatio Walpole	Member of Parliament for Great Yarmouth; 1723–1738; With: Horatio Walpole 1723–1734; Sir Edward Walpole 1734–1738	Succeeded by Sir Edward Walpole; Roger Townshend
