= Viscount Bayning =

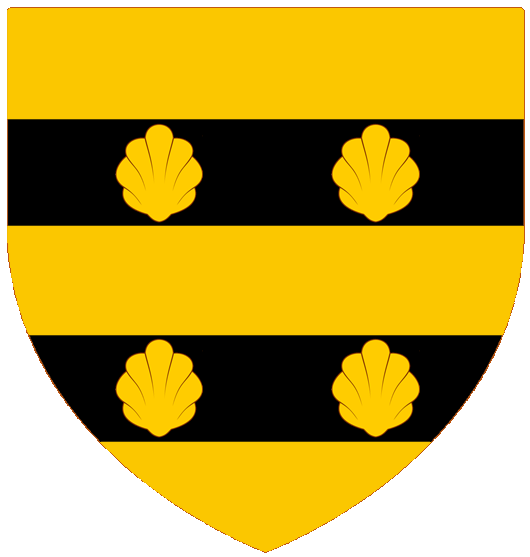
Or two Bars Sable on each as many Escallops of the first

Viscount Bayning, of Sudbury in the County of Suffolk, was a title in the Peerage of England. It was created on 8 March 1628 for Paul Bayning, 1st Baron Bayning. He had already been created a Baronet, of Bentley Parva in the County of Essex, in the Baronetage of England on 24 September 1611, and Baron Bayning, of Horkesley in the County of Essex, on 27 February 1628, also in the Peerage of England. He was succeeded by his son, the second Viscount. On his early death in 1638, the titles became extinct.

The substantial Bayning estates in Essex and Sussex devolved on the Honourable Anne Bayning, daughter of the first Viscount. In 1674, the viscountcy was revived in favour when she was made Viscountess Bayning, of Foxley in the County of Berkshire, for life, in the Peerage of England. She was the wife of firstly Henry Murray, Groom of the Bedchamber to Charles I, and secondly of Sir John Baber. The life peerage became extinct on her death in 1678. The Bayning title was revived once again in 1797 in favour of the Viscountess Bayning's great-great-grandson Charles Townshend, who was made Baron Bayning in the Peerage of Great Britain. See this title for more information.

The Honourable Elizabeth Bayning, daughter of the first Viscount, married Francis Lennard, 14th Baron Dacre, and was created Countess of Sheppey for life in 1680. The Honourable Mary Bayning, daughter of the first Viscount, married William Villiers, 2nd Viscount Grandison, and was the mother of Barbara, Duchess of Cleveland, mistress of Charles II.

== Viscount Bayning (1628) ==
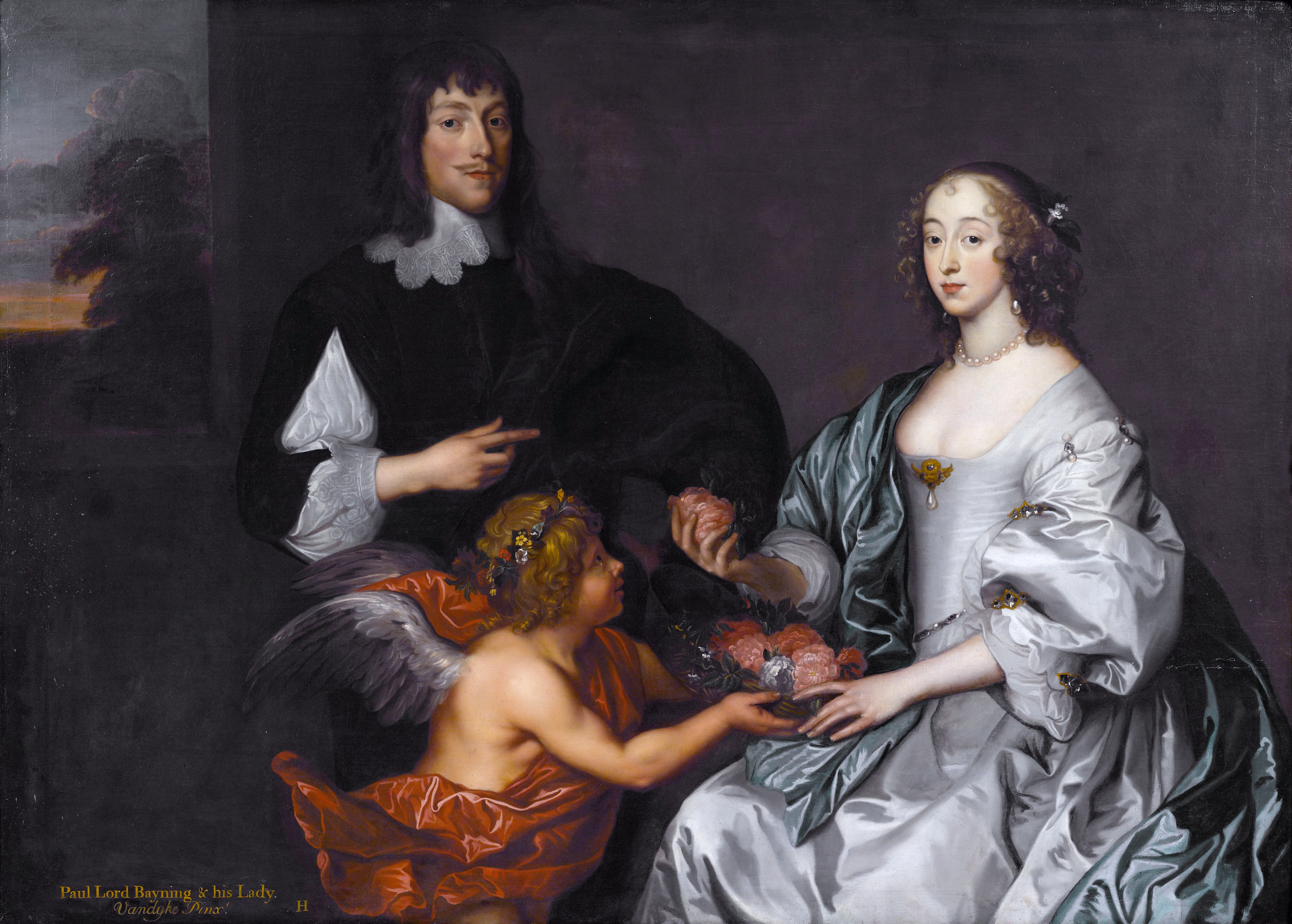
Paul Bayning, 2nd Viscount Bayning and his wife

- Paul Bayning, 1st Viscount Bayning (1588–1629)
- Paul Bayning, 2nd Viscount Bayning (1616–1638)

== Viscountess Bayning (1674) ==
- Anne Baber, Viscountess Bayning (1619–1678)

== See also ==
- Baron Bayning
- Duke of Cleveland

Baronetage of England
| Preceded by Napier Baronets | Bayning Baronets; 24 September 1611 | Succeeded by Temple Baronets |
