= 1768 British general election =

Election in Great Britain

- 16 March – 6 May 1768

All 558 seats in the House of Commons 280 seats needed for a majority
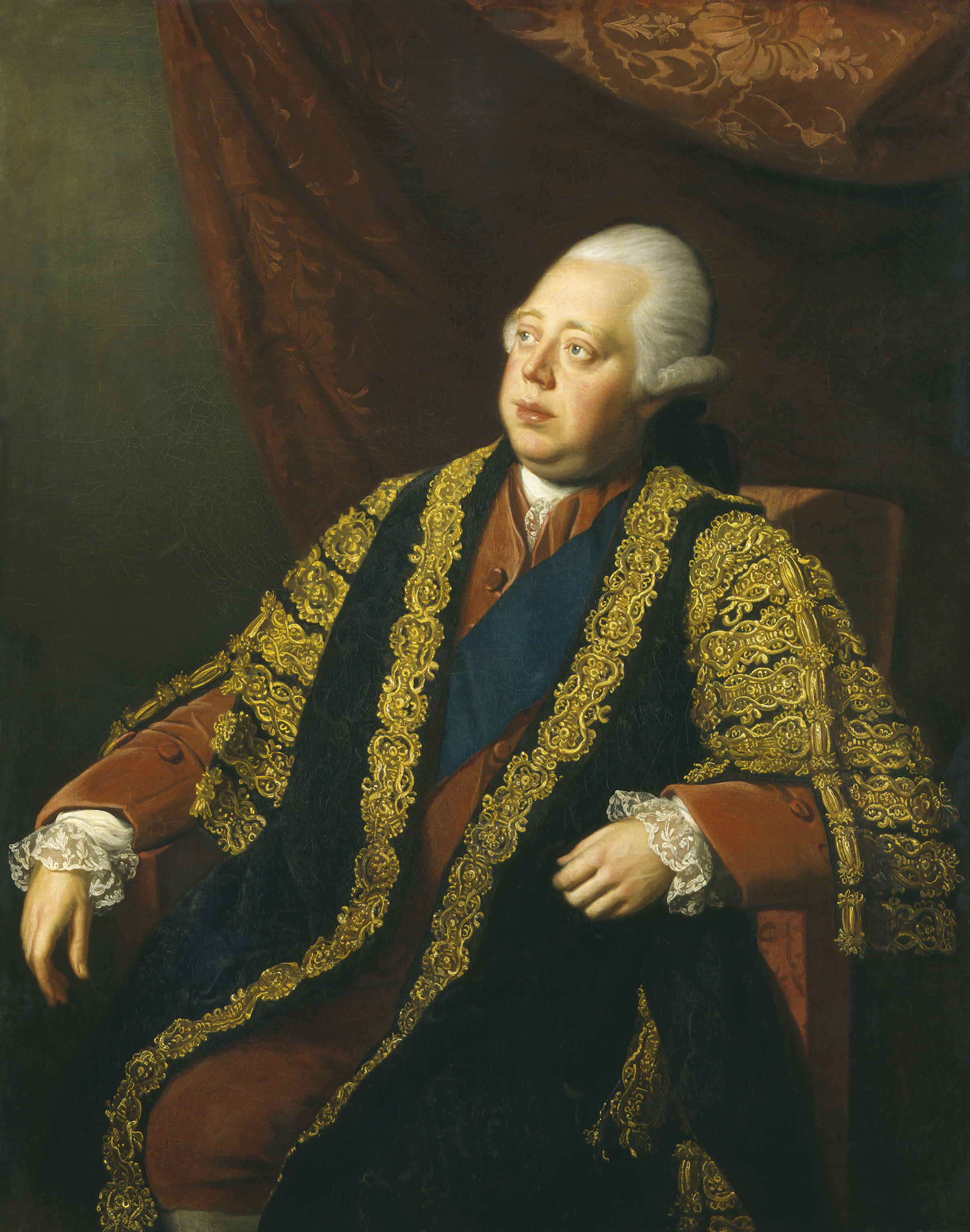

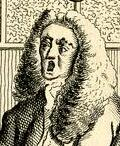

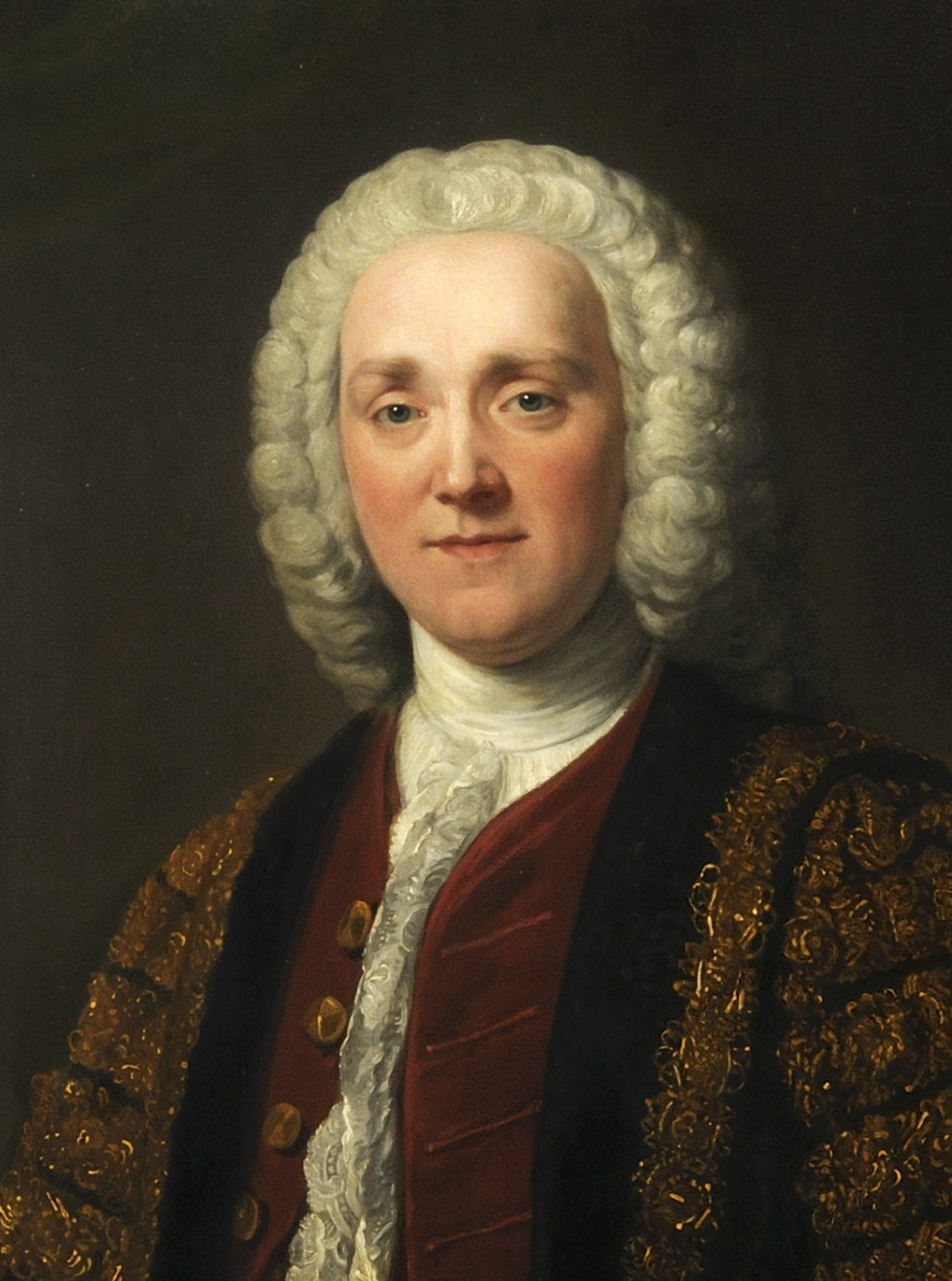

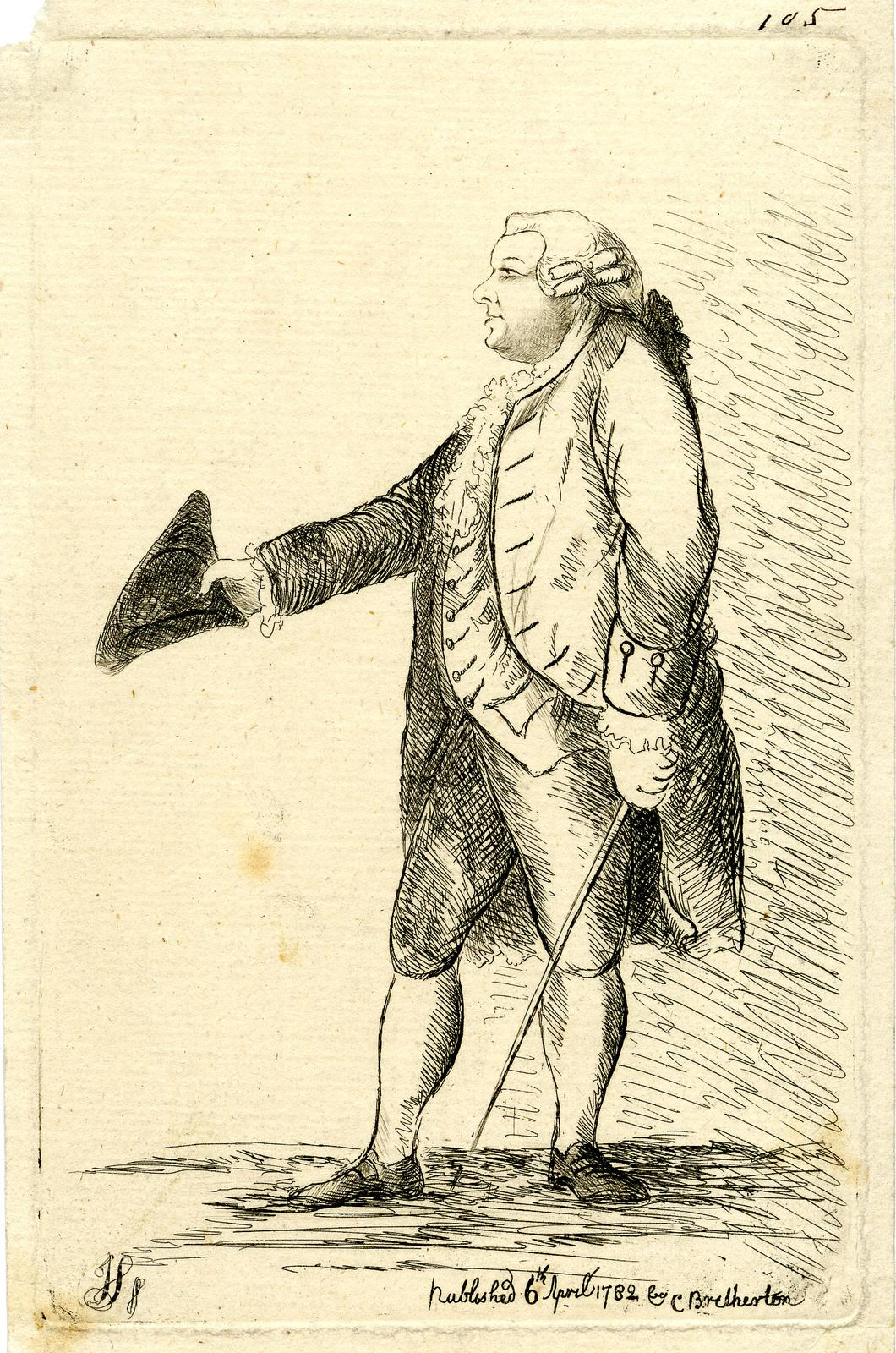
	First party	Second party
Leader	Lord North	William Dowdeswell
Party	Ministerialist	Rockinghamite
Leader's seat	Banbury	Worcestershire
Seats won	221	57
Seat change	▼4	▲3
	Third party	Fourth party
Leader	George Grenville	Richard Rigby
Party	Grenvillite	Bedfordite
Leader's seat	Buckingham	Tavistock
Seats won	31	20
Seat change	▼10	▼3
- Composition of the House of Commons after the election
Prime Minister before election
Earl of Chatham
Chathamite
Prime Minister after election
Earl of Chatham
Chathamite

The 1768 British general election returned members to serve in the House of Commons of the 13th Parliament of Great Britain to be held, after the merger of the Parliament of England and the Parliament of Scotland in 1707.

The election took place amid continuing shifts within politics which had occurred with the accession of George III in 1760. The Tories who had long been in parliamentary opposition having not won an election since 1713 had disintegrated with its former parliamentarians gravitating between the various Whig factions, the Ministry, or continued political independence as a Country Gentleman. No Tory party existed at this point, though the label of Tory was occasionally used as a political insult by opposition groups against the government. Since the last general election the Whigs had lost cohesion and had split into various factions aligned with leading political figures. The leading figures around the period of the prior election, namely the Earl of Bute, the Duke of Newcastle and the Earl of Chatham, were all retiring from political life for various reasons. While Chatham remained the nominal figurehead leader of the Ministry, the administration was centred on the First Lord of the Treasury; the Duke of Grafton, and his leader in the commons; Lord North.

The election took place during a lull in political conflict, with there being a lack of any real political debate over policy or principle between the main factions. The major opposition factions, the Rockingham Whigs under the Marquess of Rockingham and the Grenvillites under George Grenville owed their origins and strength to the periods when their respective leaders had led Ministries in the early-to-mid part of the decade. Owing to these conditions the exact makeup of the new House of Commons was unclear, though estimates suggest that the opposition gained slightly on the Ministry in the months immediately after the election. Potentially the most important part of the election was the election of the radical John Wilkes in the metropolitan constituency of Middlesex. Wilkes's election triggered a major political crisis, and marked the beginning of political radicalism in Britain.

== Background ==
During the lifetime of the 12th Parliament of Great Britain five men held office as Prime Minister leading to the description of the period as one of ministerial instability. By 1766 the successive ministries of Newcastle, Bute, Grenville and Rockingham had collapsed, resulting in the King, George III appointed William Pitt, subsequently created the Earl of Chatham as Prime Minister. George III in commissioning Chatham to form an administration had sought to find a stable Administration which would command the confidence of both the Crown and Parliament, something that Chatham appeared to possess unlike his two immediate predecessors. Despite enjoying the confidence of the Crown, Parliamentary goodwill, and genuine popularity for his role during the Seven Years' War, Chatham had squandered these opportunities amid poor health resulting in his First Lord, Grafton, taking on increasing responsibilities within government, despite his own reluctance to hold Ministerial power.

By 1767 Chatham had increasingly alienated the hitherto cordial Rockinghamites through his dismissal of Lord Edgcumbe as Treasurer of the Household. While some Rockinghamites, namely Henry Seymour Conway remained part of the Ministry, many others who did not hold cabinet-level offices resigned their positions in response. This, coupled with the replacement of these individuals by individuals formerly close to Bute assisted in increasing the unpopularity of the Ministry. To further complicate matters the Ministry was divided over what would become the Townshend Duties, proposed by Chancellor of the Exchequer Charles Townshend in relation to the American colonies. Chatham, who was sympathetic to the American colonists and their concerns, suffered a nervous breakdown in early 1767, prompting Grafton to assume increasing levels of authority within the government.

In response the opposition factions had moved to form a union among themselves which only further amplified the problems of the Ministry. After unsuccessful negotiations between the Ministry and the Rockinghamites, the Bedfordites joined the Ministry with several Bedfordites, namely Lord Gower, Viscount Weymouth and the Earl of Hillsborough becoming members of the cabinet. Over the course of the summer of 1767 Conway was gradually superseded as the government's Commons leader by Townshend who appeared in the political ascendant until his premature death in September 1767. He was ultimately replaced by Lord North who became increasingly prominent within the Ministry. By this point a general election was increasingly on the horizon resulting in numerous Independent Members of Parliament reducing their attendance, while affording opposition MPs the opportunity to raise popular political questions ahead of facing their electors. Parliament ultimately dissolved on 11 March 1768 ahead of the general election.

== Parties before election ==
The size and strength of Parliamentary factions during the lifetime of the 12th Parliament of Great Britain were rather fluid. The 1761 general election had returned a sizable Whig majority with the opposition formed by a cohort of over 100 Tories and a number of malcontent Independent Whigs notably including Francis Dashwood and Lord Strange. While the exact point of the demise of the Tory party is debated among historians of 18th-century politics, it is clear that by the end of the Parliamentary term no Tory party existed. While several dozen Tories did remain in the Commons even as late as the early 19th-century, their number gradually dwindled and no coherent unified Tory 'party' can be argued to have existed after the 1761 general election. By the time of the Chatham Administration it was clear that politics was formed along factional rather than party lines. An indication of the strength and state of parties in the period before the election is indicated in parliamentary lists created by Rockingham in November 1766, Townshend in January 1767, and Newcastle in March 1767. These lists differ greatly in various aspects especially among the classification of Independent Country Gentlemen ex-Tories, though the lists do demonstrate that the Ministry held around 220 seats, the Opposition factions around 150, while around 180 Members were Independents of varying degrees.

Faction	Rockingham List	Townshend List	Newcastle List
Ministerialist	225	212	232
Rockinghamite	121	65	101
Grenvillite	17	56	54 (Note: Includes Bedfordites)
Bedfordite	35	24	N/A
Tories/Country Gentlemen	86	34	91
Doubtful/Absent	69	69	69
Unclassified	5	98	11

== Course of the election ==
The general election was held over a period between 16 March 1768 and 6 May 1768. During this period elections did not take place at the same time in every constituency. The returning officer in each county or parliamentary borough fixed the precise date (see hustings for details of the conduct of the elections). Parliamentary oppositions during this period never had a significant chance of winning power outright at a general election where the government's patronage and ability to hand out sinecure appointments and pensions were enough to maintain power. Indeed during this period no government was ever defeated for re-election. Little material exists for the Ministry's activities with Grafton's papers being relatively bare, and no papers relating to the secret service accounts or those of the government's election agents have been found to date.

Despite the clear advantage afforded to the Ministry, the inertness of Grafton ensured that the election in various constituencies was far more competitive that it realistically should have been. This was seen in various constituencies where the Treasury nominally held significant influence but due to Grafton's inaction, Lord Newcastle was able to maintain a hold on these seats in favour of the Rockingham Whigs at the general election. The increasing competitiveness of the election was demonstrated by the fact that 83 constituencies went to the polls, an increase of 30 on the figure from 1761. 8 contests occurred in English county constituencies, 60 in English borough constituencies of varying sizes, 1 at Oxford University, 5 in Welsh constituencies, and 9 in Scottish seats. This was therefore among the most competitive general elections of the period with borough managers being seen to have increasingly difficult times managing smaller boroughs against the attacks of outsiders and insurgent candidates.

== Notable contests ==
=== Essex ===
The contest in Essex was still fought along nominal Tory and Whig partisan lines, as Edmund Burke noted 'on the business of a century ago'. Ancestral partisan alignments had persisted to the point of fossilization, though until a decade prior the constituency had been a Tory stronghold. At a by-election in 1759 the Essex Whigs had been so weak that they had resolved to run a Tory under the Whig label. The confusion of the period of Ministerial instability is reflected in a by-election in 1763 when the local Tories ran John Conyers and the Whigs ran John Luther who both professed themselves to be supporters of the Grenvillite faction. At the by-election Luther narrowly prevailed over Conyers by a margin of just over one-hundred votes. The contest in 1768 was confusing and featured a contest between supporters of the government, Luther and the ex-Tory Sir William Maynard who were opposed by the remnants of the local Tories, who ran Jacobin Houblon, Jr. and Eliab Harvey as their candidates for the by-election. At the poll the Tory candidates were soundly defeated with local landlord influences assisting the pro-government Essex Whigs in finally defeating the old Tory interest in the constituency.

=== City of London ===
The City of London was among the most politically conscious constituencies in the nation with a sizable franchise and its own elective local government system that enabled the constituency to be particularly susceptible to political movements. Politics had a class-element to an extent, with larger merchants leaning towards the government, while smaller merchants, artisans, crafters and shopkeepers who lacked government financial connections had traditionally supported local 'Patriot' Opposition Whigs and Tories. The constituency's four seats had been won by nominal Tories of varying stripes in 1761: the Pittite and increasingly prominent radical William Beckford, fellow Pitt supporter Richard Glyn, Ministerial-leaning Thomas Harley, and Robert Ladbroke, who appealed to all interests in the constituency out of a principle of 'independence'. Pitt had enjoyed considerable support in the City prior to his resignation from the government in 1761 and his failure to cultivate support. Opposition to government economic policies had enable the slow increase in anti-government and 'radical' political sympathies among voters.

The contest in 1768 saw all four incumbents run for re-election, joined by American merchant and Rockinghamite Barlow Trecothick, independent John Paterson, and the last minute bid by radical John Wilkes who had recently returned from exile in France. Wilkes had neither a programme nor a party and was unable to gain a foothold during the election. Ultimately Harley, Ladbroke and Beckford were easily returned, while Glyn was narrowly defeated by Trecothick. Wilkes polled just over a thousand votes in this constituency. Radicalism would increasingly become more prominent in the constituency with none of the four incumbents standing for re-election in 1774 (Beckford and Ladbroke were dead, Trecothick retired and Harley contested Herefordshire instead) paving the way for anti-government radicals to win all four seats.

=== Middlesex ===
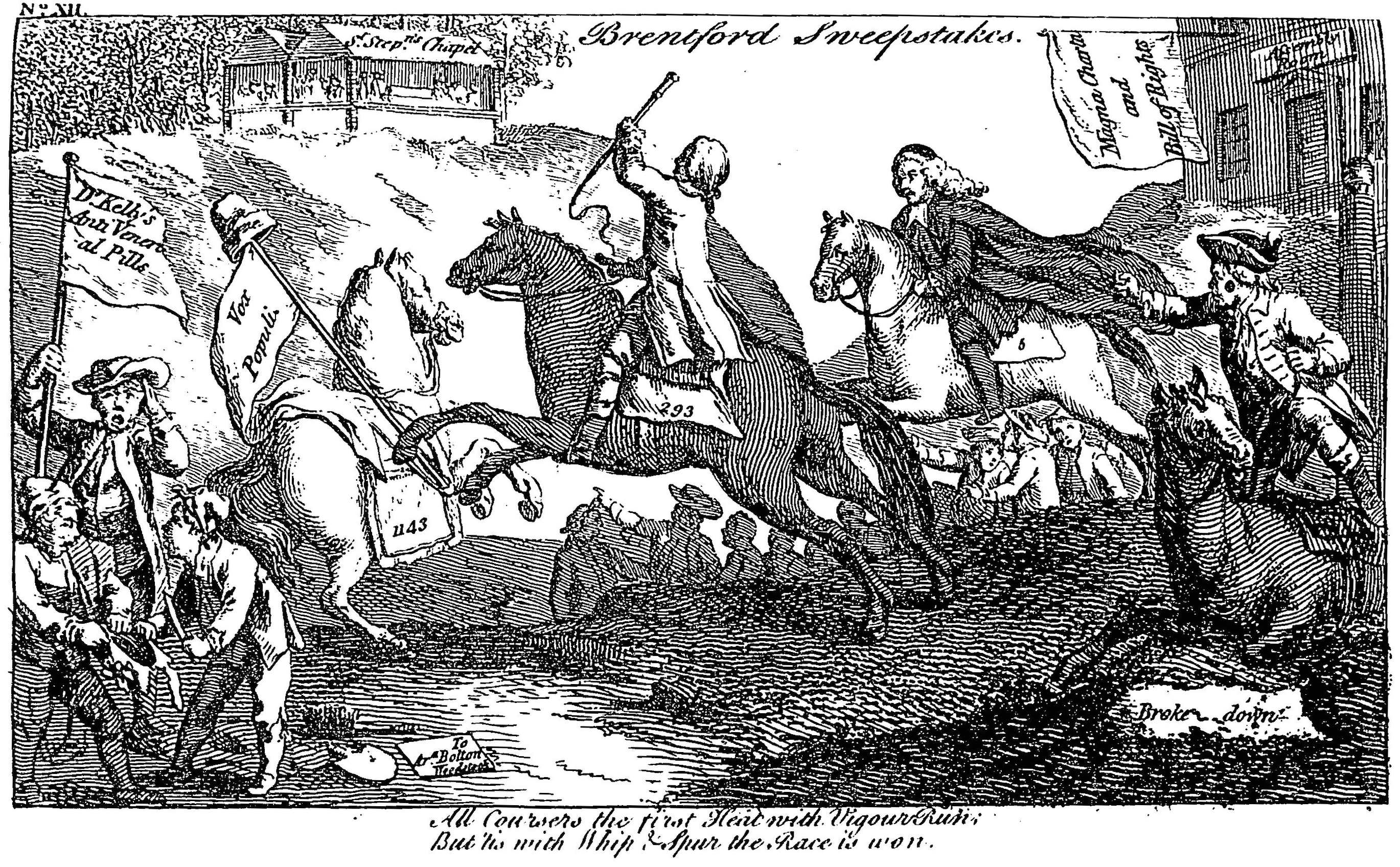
The Brentford Sweepstakes, drawing from Town and Country Magazine (13 April 1769) satirising the later 1769 by-election in Middlesex. Wilkes' riderless horse labelled "1143" indicating he got a majority of the vote, while his opponents founder.

The most prominent constituency contest of the election was that in Middlesex. The constituency had since a 1750 by-election been held as a compromise between the local Tories and Whigs by Whig William Beauchamp-Proctor and Tory George Cooke. The two had held their seats without a contest at the 1754 and 1761 general elections with the assumption that this tranquility would likely be maintained in the coming 1768 election. In February 1768 radical John Wilkes had returned from his self-imposed exile in France where he had remained for four years after being convinced for libel and blasphemy. Wilkes' financial situation had become desperate necessitating him to return to reclaim a seat at Westminster. Wilkes' attempt to win one of the four seats in the City of London had fallen considerably short several days prior. Undeterred he opted to campaign in the neighbouring Middlesex county seat, challenging the Courtier Whig Beauchamp-Proctor and the ailing, gout-ridden Chathamite Cooke. With around two-thousand electors turning out to vote, Wilkes topped the poll and unseated Beauchamp-Proctor, being returned with Cooke. Some residual Tory support may explain Wilkes' success with the St. James Chronicle noting that Wilkes and Cooke polled well in the Tory east of the constituency where small freeholders were prevalent. Wilkes' support from the old Tory Half Moon Club and the Independent Electors of Westminster, in addition to his employing of blue ribbons for his campaign, are telling. Regardless of the psephological points, Wilkes had polled strongly, much to the chagrin of prominent political figures. As the historian John Cannon noted:

"The main reason for Wilkes’s success in Middlesex is that he had, either by accident or design, hit on the one county in the kingdom where his campaign might produce a response. Middlesex was by far the most urbanised of all the counties, and Wilkes’s victory demonstrated the extent to which Middlesex was dominated by London. The voting strength of the hundred of Ossulstone, in which the urban development had taken place, was more than twice that of the other five hundreds combined. Moreover, a very large proportion of the freeholders of Middlesex were in business. The London voters included not only merchants, brewers, attorneys, distillers, and manufacturers, but also what contemporaries called ‘the little freeholders’—cheese-mongers, upholsterers, grocers, booksellers, weavers, ironmongers, undertakers, apothecaries, plumbers, drapers, watchmakers, turners, cashiers, and carpenters. These shopkeepers and small tradesmen provided the bulk of Wilkes’s following: they were less subject to intimidation and control than the tenant farmers in the other county constituencies."

Wilkes' election prompted the Ministry to unseat him only for Wilkes to win a series of three by-elections, until finally the Ministry controversially sat a rival, Henry Luttrell as the new Member of Parliament instead.

=== Oxford University ===
The constituency where the traditional party alignments persisted the longest and most strongly was Oxford University. The constituency had been resolutely Tory in its politics since before the Hanoverian succession and jealously guarded its political independence and Tory identity, leading Horace Walpole to brand Oxfordshire 'a little Kingdom of Jacobitism'. Since a 1762 by-election the representation of the constituency had been shared by two old Tories, William Bagot and Roger Newdigate, who both enjoyed prior Parliamentary experience before being returned by the University. The University Whigs were well aware that the stood little chance of wrestling control of the seat from the Tories except if the Tory interest was divided. An opportunity for a contest emerged after Bagot's death in spring 1768. The Whigs desired to run Charles Jenkinson, a former close ally of Bute as their candidate. Jenkinson hailed from a Tory family but had played a role in the infamous Oxfordshire election of 1754 which had soured Tories considerably towards him. The Tory meanwhile returned William Dolben as a stopgap MP until the general election, Dolben would meanwhile win office in the general election in Northamptonshire. At the general election the popular and respected Newdigate's position was secure, while there was a genuine contest for the second seat. The Tories were initially split between the candidacies of Amersham (UK Parliament constituency) MP William Drake, Sr. and squire Francis Page. Yet the fear of a split and the victory of Jenkinson resolved them to unify behind Page. The Tories were bolstered by a fear that a victory by a pro-government candidate, namely Jenkinson would result in the constituency losing its independence and become a government borough. Additional candidates included Thomas Fitzmaurice and the jurist George Hay whose quixotic bid mystified many and attracted little support. Fitzmaurice, shortly before polling, dropped out and backed Page after being assured of support at a future election. Ultimately the Tory interest would hold firm at the University with Newdigate and Page being easily returned over Jenkinson and Hay.

== Results ==
The overall result of the general election remains unclear to historians owing to the confused nature of politics and partisanship during the 1760s. Nevertheless some precise electoral facts are clear. 167 Members of Parliament were returned who had not formerly sat in Parliament. Of these Members during their first years in office, they tended to lean towards the Opposition as seen by their stances with relation to the Middlesex election affair. Yet over the course of the Parliamentary term this preference began to wear off resulting in the Ministry, especially after Lord North assumed its leadership in 1770; being assured of the confidence of the Commons on most matters. That Grafton's ineptitude cost the Ministry various winnable seats and extra support in Parliament is demonstrated by the clear fact that the Opposition, be it factional or Independent MPs, increased in size to some degree as a result of the 1768 general election. Figures for several of the factions and tendencies in the Commons are available. Around 140 factional MPs are estimated to have been returned. Of this figure it is known that the Rockinghamites increased their number of MPs from 54 to 57. The Grenvillites entered the election with 41 MPs and incurred nineteen loses and gained ten seats, winning them 31 seats. The Bedfordites according to an overview of their MPs held around 23 seats prior to the election and ultimately won around 20 seats. While no coherent Tory party remained of the Tories elected in 1761 or at by-elections during the Parliament, 53 were re-elected, though of these MPs, 28 became regular Opposition voters, 14 'pure' Independents, 26 government-leaning 'Hopeful' Independents, 4 Ministerialists, 2 Grenvillites, and 1 Bedfordite. With regards to the overall figure of MPs aligned with the Ministry this is generally unclear, though the May 1769 division to seat Luttrell as the Member for Middlesex, the Ministry mustered 221 votes, which should be judged as the core of the Ministry's support, not including the aforementioned 'Hopeful' Independents who could be expected to lean in the Ministry's favour.

== See also ==
- List of parliaments of Great Britain
- List of MPs elected in the British general election, 1768

== Bibliography ==
- Brooke, John (1956), The Chatham Administration, 1766-1768, London: Macmillan
- Colley, Linda (1982), In Defiance of Oligarchy: The Tory Party, 1714-60, Cambridge: Cambridge University Press
- Christie, Ian R. (1987), "Party in Politics in the Age of Lord North's Administration", Parliamentary History, 6 (1): 47–68, doi:10.1111/j.1750-0206.1987.tb00411.x
- Jensen, Merrill (1968). The Founding of a Nation. New York: Oxford University Press.
- Namier, Lewis; Brooke, John (1964), The History of Parliament: The House of Commons, 1754–1790, vol. 3, London: HMSO
- Peters, Marie (1980), Pitt and Popularity: The Patriot Minister and London opinion during the Seven Years War, Oxford: Clarendon Press
- Rallings, Colin; Thrasher, Michael (2000), British Electoral Facts 1832–1999, Farnham: Ashgate Publishing Ltd
- Rudé, George (1980), Wilkes and Liberty: A Social Study of 1763 to 1774, Oxford: Oxford University Press
- Sack, James (1993), From Jacobite to Conservative: Reaction and orthodox in Britain, c. 1760-1832, Cambridge: Cambridge University Press
- Szechi, Daniel; Holmes, Geoffrey (2014), The Age of Oligarchy: Pre-Industrial Britain 1722-1783, London: Taylor & Francis
- Thomas, P.D.G. (2002), George III: King and Politicians, 1760-1770, Manchester: Manchester University Press
- Ward, W.R. (1958), Georgian Oxford: University Politics in the Eighteenth Century, Oxford: Clarendon Press
