= Chatham ministry =

Government of Great Britain

- 1766–1768
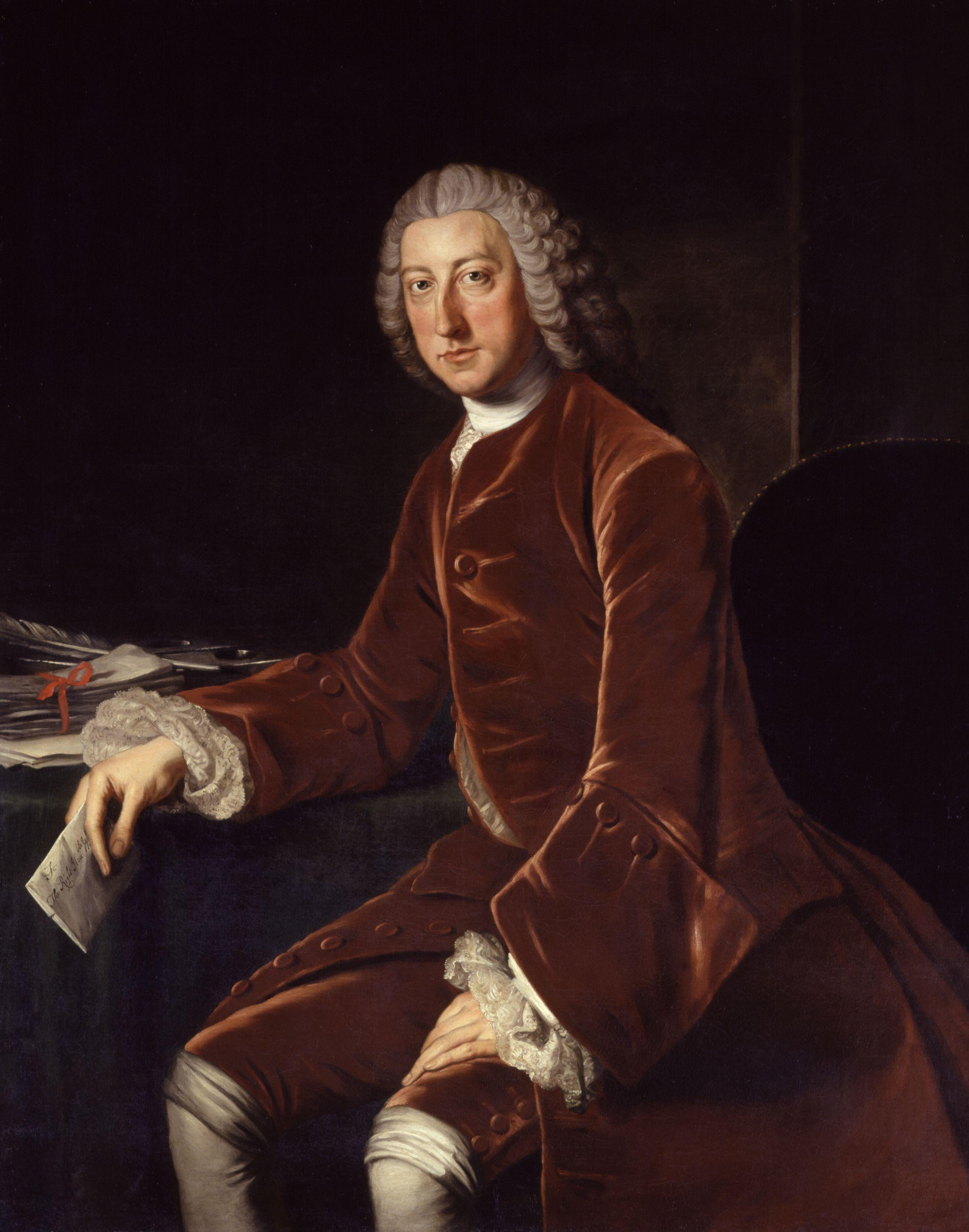
- William Pitt, 1st Earl of Chatham, was prime minister and led the ministry.
- Date formed: 30 July 1766
- Date dissolved: 14 October 1768

People and organisations
- Monarch: George III
- Prime Minister: William Pitt, 1st Earl of Chatham
- Member parties: Chathamites; Rockingham Whigs; Bedfordites (from late 1767)
- Status in legislature: Majority (coalition)
- Opposition party: Grenvillites

History
- Legislature terms: 13th GB Parliament
- Predecessor: First Rockingham ministry
- Successor: Grafton ministry

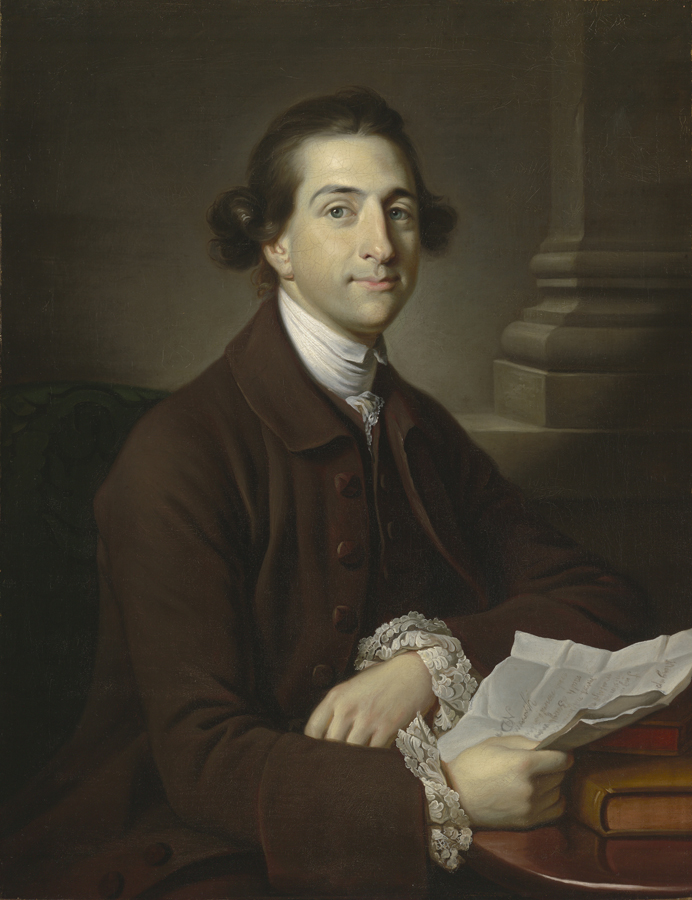
The Duke of Grafton served as First Lord of the Treasury and succeeded Chatham as Prime Minister in 1768.

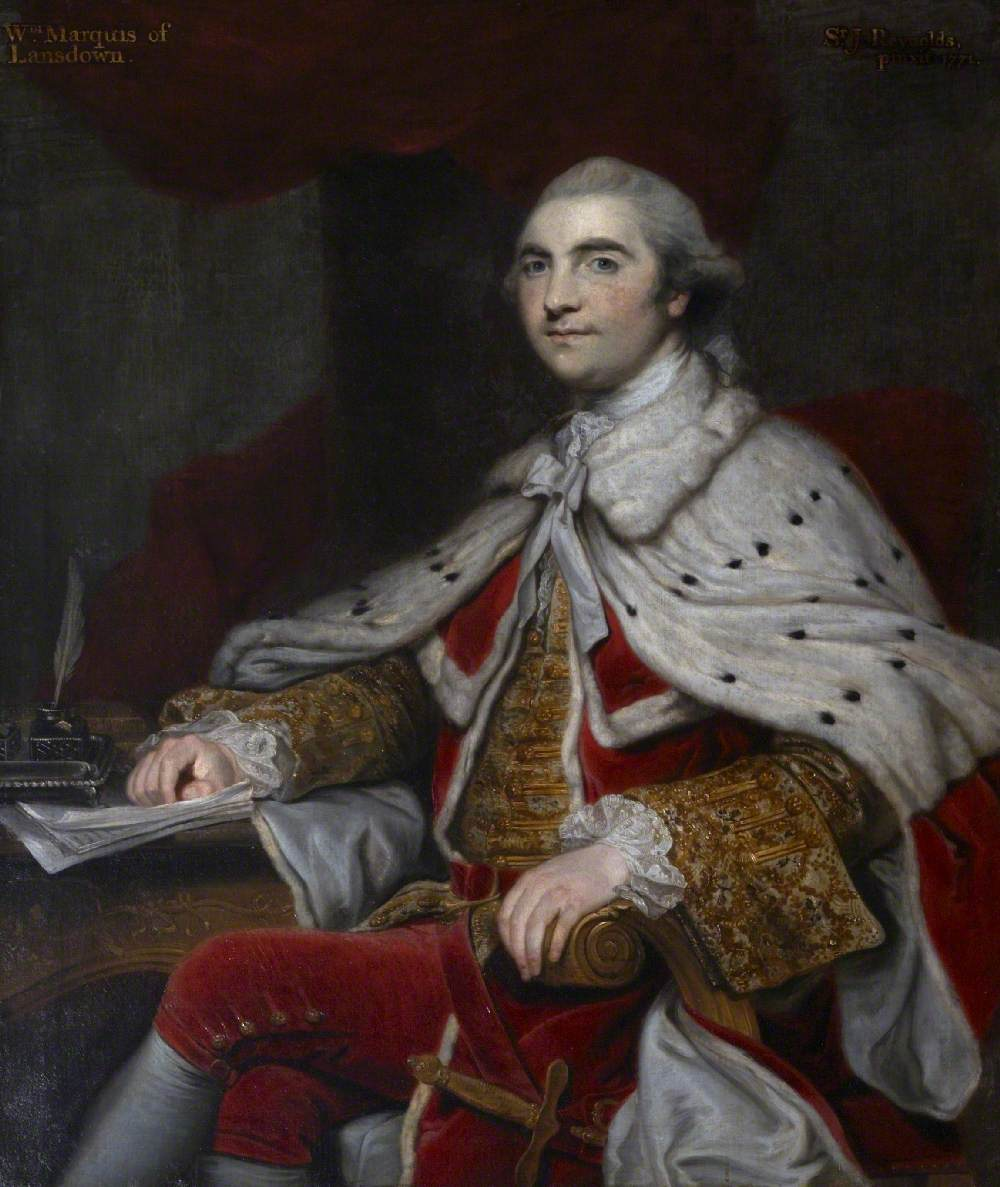
Anglo-Irish politician and future Prime Minister Lord Shelburne, a close ally of Chatham, served as Southern Secretary.

The Chatham ministry was a British government led by William Pitt, 1st Earl of Chatham that ruled between 1766 and 1768. Because of Pitt's former prominence before his title, it is sometimes referred to as the Pitt ministry. Unusually for a politician considered to be prime minister, Pitt was not the First Lord of the Treasury during the administration, but instead held the post of the Lord Privy Seal.

== History ==
Pitt had been in opposition since his 1761 resignation as Secretary of State. In July 1766, George III summoned Pitt from his Burton Pynsent country estate in Somerset. He travelled hastily to the capital and met the King at Richmond Lodge who invited him to form a government. It took several weeks of negotiations before he could settle the membership of the new administration.

Pitt, who moved to the House of Lords as Earl of Chatham upon his accession to the ministry, was determined to form a ministry of "measures, not men" that would give office to the most competent men without regard to faction. Thus, the ministry kept on Secretary of State Henry Seymour Conway from the previous, Rockingham Whig, ministry, and, after Chatham's brother-in-law Lord Temple refused the Treasury and decided to continue in opposition with his brother, former prime minister George Grenville, he promoted Conway's fellow Rockingham Whig the Duke of Grafton to that position. Chatham's own close associates Lord Camden and Lord Shelburne became Lord Chancellor and Southern Secretary of State, respectively, and the ministry was filled out with other politicians of unclear factional allegiance – keeping on Lord Egmont at the Admiralty and Lord Granby at the Board of Ordnance, moving the former Lord Chancellor, Lord Northington to the sinecure position of Lord President of the Council, and appointing the slippery Charles Townshend to the Exchequer.

Chatham was ill with gout for long periods, and his government struggled to fulfill its various goals. Almost immediately its "measures, not men" philosophy began to come apart when Lord Egmont resigned the Admiralty due to his opposition to Chatham's foreign policy and was replaced by the Rockingham Whig Sir Charles Saunders. Its major foreign policy objective – to secure Britain a major alliance partner in Europe that would end its diplomatic isolation – failed when Frederick the Great of Prussia rejected an offer to reform the Anglo-Prussian Alliance.

Soon after, Chatham managed to largely alienate the heretofore cautiously friendly Rockingham faction by dismissing their ally Lord Edgcumbe, the Treasurer of the Household. Though both Grafton, who had already been moving away from the Rockinghams due to his strong admiration for Pitt, and Conway remained in the ministry, Saunders and a large number of non-cabinet officeholders from the Rockingham faction resigned their positions. Though Saunders was replaced by the competent Admiral Sir Edward Hawke, most of the other positions were given to former supporters of the royal favourite Lord Bute, increasing the unpopularity of the ministry and strengthening the opposition. At around the same time, and with Chatham absent from the capital, the ministry was further riven by Chancellor Townshend's introduction of the idea of what was to become the Townshend Duties on the American colonies, which strongly divided the ministry.

In the midst of this crisis in early 1767 Chatham apparently had a nervous breakdown and withdrew entirely from the conduct of affairs. Grafton attempted to maintain the ministry in his absence, but with difficulty due to the alliance between the three opposition factions of the Rockingham Whigs, Bedford Whigs, and Grenvillites and to conflicts within the ministry itself. After an unsuccessful attempt to bring his former allies in the Rockingham faction to support the government, Grafton instead turned to the Bedfords, leading to a major reconstruction of the ministry in late 1767 and early 1768, with Bedford's followers Lord Gower and Lord Weymouth as Lord President and Northern Secretary (Conway became a minister without portfolio), and the like-minded Lord Hillsborough given the new office of Secretary of State for the Colonies – taking responsibility for the American colonies from the more conciliatory Shelburne, whose differences with the rest of the cabinet had led him to cease attendance at cabinet meetings. The death of Charles Townshend had also led to his replacement at the Exchequer by Lord North, who also took leadership of the commons over from Conway, who was increasingly uncomfortable with the direction of the ministry.

The adhesion of the Bedfords ultimately gave them a dominant role in the ministry, which they used to pursue a more hardline policy towards the American colonies than Chatham had originally intended, or than several of the remaining were comfortable with. In October 1768, the Bedfords persuaded Grafton that it would be necessary to remove Shelburne from the ministry. This threatened dismissal roused Chatham, who resigned his post alongside Shelburne. Although Chatham's close friend Camden remained in the government, it was clear that the ministry was now dominated by the Bedfords, and the Duke of Grafton formally took over as prime minister and led the Grafton ministry, which lasted for slightly over a year until January 1770.

== Ministry ==
Portfolio	Minister	Took office	Left office	Party
First Lord of the Treasury	Augustus FitzRoy, 3rd Duke of Grafton	30 July 1766	14 October 1768	Whig
Lord Chancellor	Charles Pratt, 1st Baron Camden	30 July 1766	14 October 1768	Whig
Lord President of the Council	Robert Henley, 1st Earl of Northington	30 July 1766	22 December 1767	Whig
Lord President of the Council	Granville Leveson-Gower, 2nd Earl Gower	22 December 1767	14 October 1768	Tory
Lord Privy Seal	William Pitt, 1st Earl of Chatham (head of ministry)	30 July 1766	14 October 1768	Whig
Chancellor of the Exchequer	Charles Townshend	30 July 1766	4 September 1767	Whig
Chancellor of the Exchequer	Frederick North, Lord North	4 September 1767	14 October 1768	Tory
Secretary of State for the Northern Department	Henry Seymour Conway	30 July 1766	20 January 1768	Whig
Secretary of State for the Northern Department	Thomas Thynne, 3rd Viscount Weymouth	20 January 1768	14 October 1768	Tory
Secretary of State for the Southern Department	William Petty, 2nd Earl of Shelburne	30 July 1766	14 October 1768	Whig
Secretary of State for the Colonies	Wills Hill, 1st Earl of Hillsborough	27 February 1768	14 October 1768	Independent
First Lord of the Admiralty	John Perceval, 2nd Earl of Egmont	30 July 1766	September 1766	Tory
First Lord of the Admiralty	Sir Charles Saunders	September 1766	December 1766	Independent
First Lord of the Admiralty	Sir Edward Hawke	December 1766	14 October 1768	Independent
Master-General of the Ordnance	John Manners, Marquess of Granby	30 July 1766	14 October 1768	Whig
Leader of the House of Commons	Henry Seymour Conway	30 July 1766	20 January 1768	Whig
Leader of the House of Commons	Frederick North, Lord North	20 January 1768	14 October 1768	Tory
Minister without Portfolio	Henry Seymour Conway	20 January 1768	14 October 1768	Whig

== Notes ==
=== References ===
Bibliography

- Black, Jeremy (1992). William Pitt. Cambridge University Press.
- Brown, Peter Douglas. William Pitt, Earl of Chatham: The Great Commoner. George Allen & Unwin, 1978.
- Jensen, Merrill (1968). The Founding of a Nation. New York: Oxford University Press. ISBN 0872207056.
- Winstanley, D. A. Lord Chatham and the Whig Opposition. Cambridge: Cambridge University Press, 1912.

Preceded by First Rockingham ministry	Government of Great Britain; 1766–1768	Succeeded by Grafton ministry
