= Grafton ministry =

Government of Great Britain

- 1768–1770
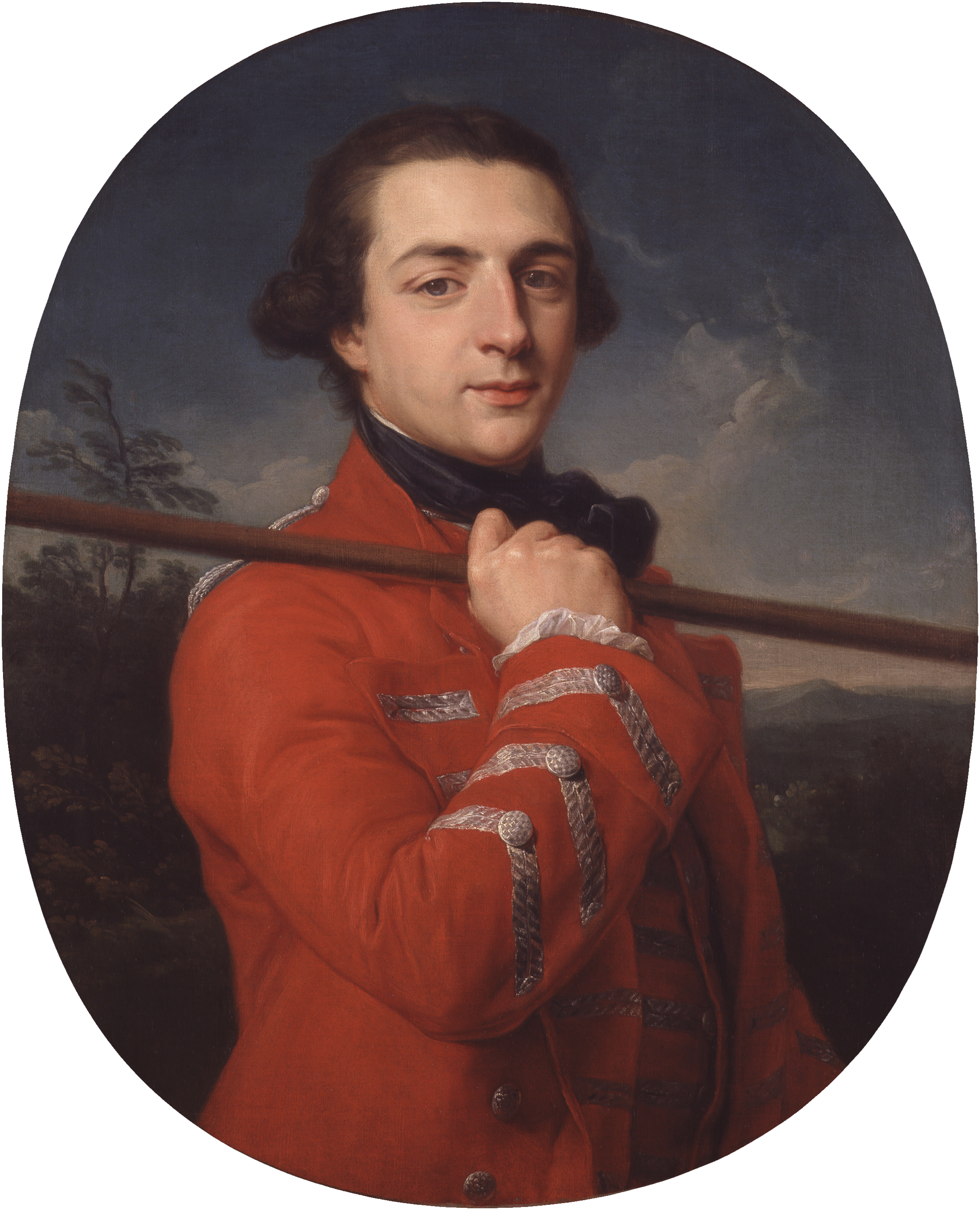
- Grafton by Pompeo Batoni
- Date formed: 14 October 1768
- Date dissolved: 28 January 1770

People and organisations
- Monarch: George III
- Prime Minister: Augustus FitzRoy, 3rd Duke of Grafton
- Total no. of members: 12 appointments
- Member parties: Bedfordites; Rockingham Whigs
- Status in legislature: Majority (coalition)
- Opposition party: Grenvillites

History
- Legislature terms: 13th GB Parliament
- Predecessor: Chatham ministry
- Successor: North ministry

The Grafton ministry was the British government headed by Prime Minister Augustus FitzRoy, 3rd Duke of Grafton, in government from October 1768 to January 1770.

== History ==
The Grafton ministry arose from the gradual decay of its predecessor, the Chatham ministry, which Grafton had effectively been leading for some time due to the illness and withdrawal from public affairs of its nominal head Lord Chatham. In order to maintain a comfortable parliamentary majority, Grafton had drawn the Bedford Whigs (Earl Gower, Viscount Weymouth, and the Earl of Hillsborough) into the ministry at the end of 1767. Although Grafton himself and many of the previous members of the government (including Chatham) supported a conciliatory policy towards Britain's restless American colonies, the Bedfords favoured stronger, more coercive measures, and the ministry, in spite of Grafton's own views, drifted towards the Bedford position. When this led to an attempt to replace the conciliatory Southern Secretary, Lord Shelburne, Chatham finally roused himself enough to resign from his position as Lord Privy Seal, leaving Grafton as the nominal as well as real head of a ministry in which the Bedford faction was now stronger than ever.

The government was widely criticised for its handling of foreign affairs, particularly for allowing the Republic of Corsica, a British ally, to fall to the French during the Corsican Crisis. It was subject to a series of attacks in what became known as the Junius Letters. With the resignation in January 1770 of Grafton himself, Lord Camden, and Lord Granby, Chatham's remaining adherents in the cabinet, the Grafton ministry was replaced by the North ministry under the Chancellor of the Exchequer, Lord North, which was to last until 1782.

== Cabinet ==
Portfolio	Minister	Took office	Left office	Party
First Lord of the Treasury	Augustus FitzRoy, 3rd Duke of Grafton (head of ministry)	14 October 1768	28 January 1770	Whig
Lord Chancellor	Charles Pratt, 1st Baron Camden	30 July 1766	17 January 1770	Whig
Lord Chancellor	Charles Yorke	17 January 1770	20 January 1770	Independent
Lord President of the Council	Granville Leveson-Gower, 2nd Earl Gower	22 December 1767	24 November 1779	Tory
Lord Privy Seal	George Hervey, 2nd Earl of Bristol	1768	1770	Independent
Chancellor of the Exchequer; Leader of the House of Commons	Frederick North, Lord North	11 September 1767	27 March 1782	Tory
Secretary of State for the Northern Department	Thomas Thynne, 3rd Viscount Weymouth	20 January 1768	21 October 1768	Tory
Secretary of State for the Northern Department	William Nassau de Zuylestein, 4th Earl of Rochford	21 October 1768	19 December 1770	Independent
Secretary of State for the Southern Department	William Petty, 2nd Earl of Shelburne	30 July 1766	20 October 1768	Whig
Secretary of State for the Southern Department	Thomas Thynne, 3rd Viscount Weymouth	21 October 1768	12 December 1770	Tory
Secretary of State for the Colonies	Wills Hill, 1st Earl of Hillsborough	27 February 1768	27 August 1772	Independent
First Lord of the Admiralty	Sir Edward Hawke	1766	1771	Independent
Master-General of the Ordnance	John Manners, Marquess of Granby	14 May 1763	18 October 1770	Independent
Minister without Portfolio	Henry Seymour Conway	1768	1770	Whig

=== Changes ===
- October 1768 – Lord Weymouth is succeeded by Lord Rochford as Northern Secretary. Lord Shelburne is succeeded by Weymouth as Southern Secretary.
- January 1770 – Lord Camden is succeeded by Charles Yorke as Lord Chancellor. Yorke dies on 20 January and the position is left in commission.

Preceded by Chatham ministry	Government of Great Britain; 1768–1770	Succeeded by North ministry
