= Anna Chamber =

English noblewoman and poet

Anne Chamber
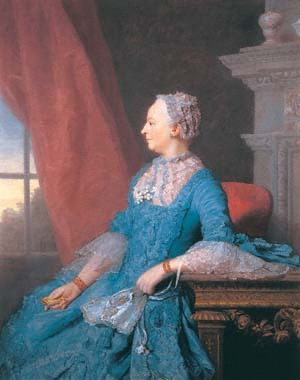
- Died: 7 April 1777; Stowe
- Spouse(s): Richard, second Earl Temple
- Children: One

Anne Chamber (married name Anna Grenville-Temple, Countess Temple) (died 7 April 1777) was an English noblewoman and poet.

== Life ==
Chamber and her elder sister Mary were co-heiresses to their late parents' estate. On 7 May 1737, Chamber married Richard Grenville-Temple, 2nd Earl Temple. In 1742, their only child, Elizabeth, died at age four. The couple reportedly had a large income. Anne's dowry was reportedly £50,000, and Richard was erroneously referred to as the richest man in England.

Chamber is known for her poetry, which she took up as an adult. Horace Walpole's company published 100 of her poems in 1764 under the name "Poems" by "Anna Chamber".

Chamber died in Stowe in Buckinghamshire in 1777 just after her 40th wedding anniversary.

In 1818, the verses she had sent to Lady Charles Spencer were published.
