= First Rockingham ministry =

Government of Great Britain

- 1765–1766
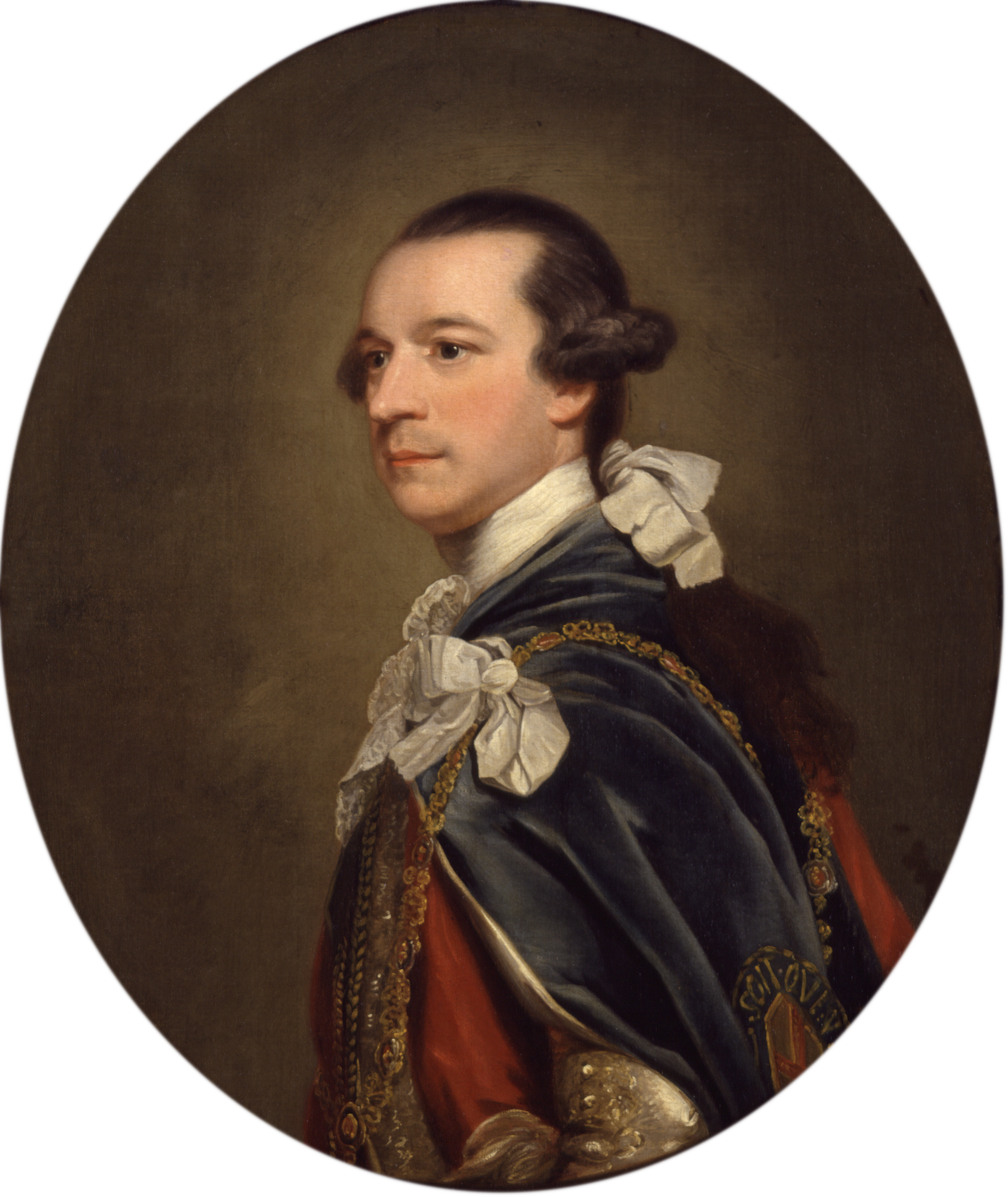
- Rockingham (after Joshua Reynolds)
- Date formed: 13 July 1765
- Date dissolved: 30 July 1766

People and organisations
- Monarch: George III
- Prime Minister: Lord Rockingham
- Total no. of members: 12 appointments
- Member party: Rockingham Whigs
- Status in legislature: Majority
- Opposition party: Grenvillites

History
- Legislature terms: 12th GB Parliament
- Predecessor: Grenville ministry
- Successor: Chatham ministry

The first Rockingham ministry was a British ministry headed by Charles Watson-Wentworth, 2nd Marquess of Rockingham from 1765 to 1766 during the reign of King George III. The government was made up mainly of his followers known as the Rockingham Whigs. The most influential member of the government was Thomas Pelham-Holles, 1st Duke of Newcastle, a former prime minister, who served as Lord Privy Seal. It is often referred to as the only government ever to have been made up almost entirely of members of the Jockey Club, with Rockingham himself being a prominent patron and follower of the turf. Rockingham was noted for his ignorance of foreign affairs, and his ministry failed to reverse the growing isolation of Britain within Europe (Simms 2008, p. 520).

The Rockingham ministry fell in 1766 and was replaced by one headed by William Pitt, later the Earl of Chatham.

== Cabinet ==
Portfolio	Minister	Took office	Left office
First Lord of the Treasury; Leader of the House of Lords	Charles Watson-Wentworth, 2nd Marquess of Rockingham (head of ministry)	13 July 1765	30 July 1766
Lord Chancellor	Robert Henley, 1st Earl of Northington	16 January 1761	30 July 1766
Lord President of the Council	Daniel Finch, 8th Earl of Winchilsea	12 July 1765	30 July 1766
Lord Privy Seal	Thomas Pelham-Holles, 1st Duke of Newcastle	30 July 1765	30 July 1766
Chancellor of the Exchequer	William Dowdeswell	16 July 1765	2 August 1766
Secretary of State for the Northern Department	Augustus FitzRoy, 3rd Duke of Grafton	12 July 1765	14 May 1766
Secretary of State for the Northern Department	Henry Seymour Conway	23 May 1766	20 January 1768
Secretary of State for the Southern Department; Leader of the House of Commons	Henry Seymour Conway	12 July 1765	23 May 1766
Secretary of State for the Southern Department	Charles Lennox, 3rd Duke of Richmond	23 May 1766	29 July 1766
First Lord of the Admiralty	John Perceval, 2nd Earl of Egmont	1763	1766
Master-General of the Ordnance	John Manners, Marquess of Granby	1763	1770
Minister without Portfolio	Prince William, Duke of Cumberland	1765	31 October 1765

=== Changes ===
- October 1765 – The Duke of Cumberland (also the uncle of King George III) dies.
- May 1766 – The Duke of Grafton resigns from the cabinet. Henry Seymour Conway succeeds him as Northern Secretary, and the Duke of Richmond succeeds Conway as Southern Secretary.

== Ministers not in Cabinet ==
- Lord Chamberlain – William Cavendish-Bentinck, 3rd Duke of Portland

Preceded by Grenville ministry	Government of Great Britain; 1765–1766	Succeeded by Chatham ministry
