= Richard Grenville-Temple, 2nd Earl Temple =

British politician and peer

The Right Honourable The Earl Temple KG PC
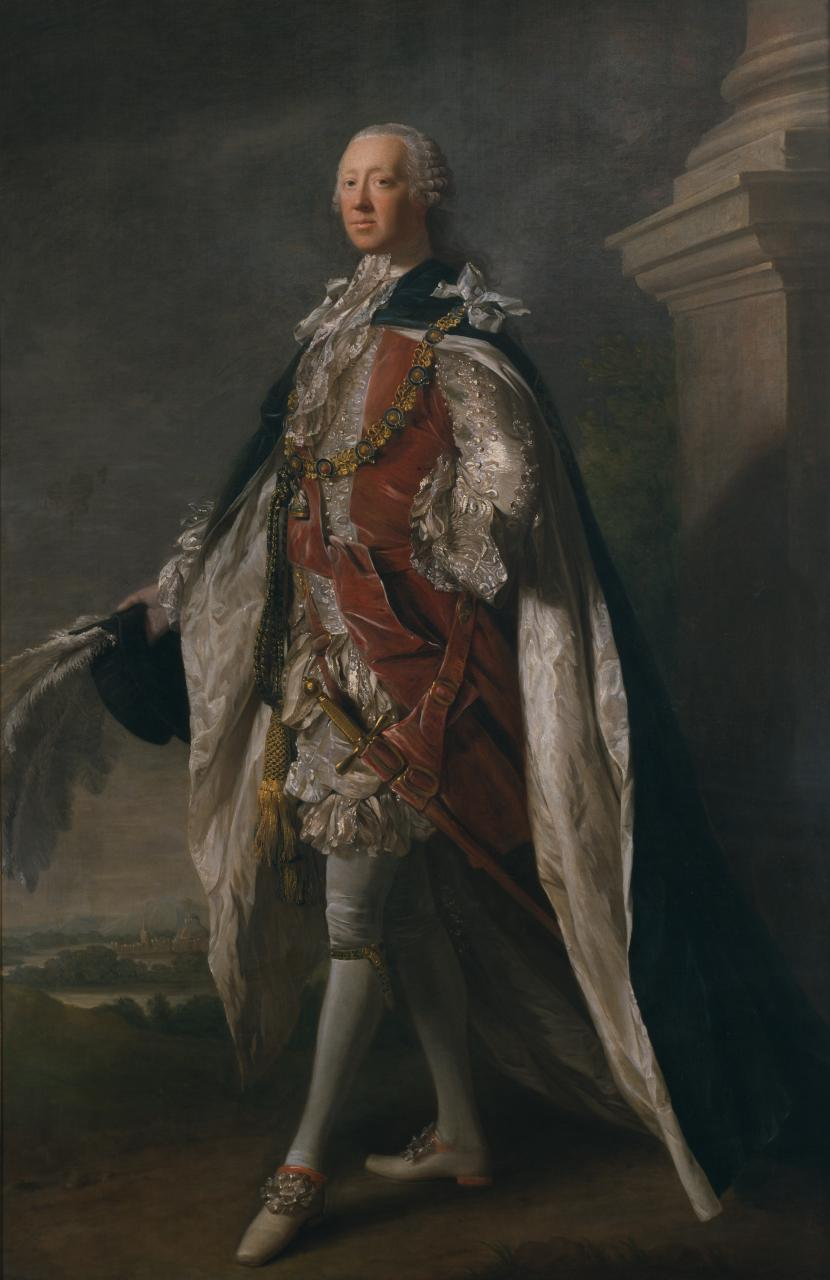
- c. 1762 portrait of Temple by Allan Ramsay

Lord Privy Seal
- In office 30 June 1757 – 5 October 1761
- Monarchs: George II; George III
- Prime Minister: The Duke of Newcastle
- Preceded by: The Earl Gower
- Succeeded by: The Duke of Bedford

First Lord of the Admiralty
- In office 1756–1757
- Monarch: George II
- Prime Minister: The Duke of Devonshire
- Preceded by: The Lord Anson
- Succeeded by: The Earl of Winchilsea

Personal details
- Born: 26 September 1711 Buckinghamshire, England
- Died: 12 September 1779 (aged 67)
- Spouse: Anna Chamber
- Parent(s): Richard Grenville; Hester Grenville, 1st Countess Temple

Richard Grenville-Temple, 2nd Earl Temple, KG, PC (26 September 1711 – 12 September 1779) was a British politician and peer who served as Lord Privy Seal from 1757 to 1761. He is best known for his association with his brother-in-law William Pitt, serving with him in the Pitt–Newcastle ministry during Britain's participation in the Seven Years' War from 1756 to 1761. He resigned, along with Pitt, in 1761 in protest over the ministry's refusal to declare war on Spain.

== Early life ==
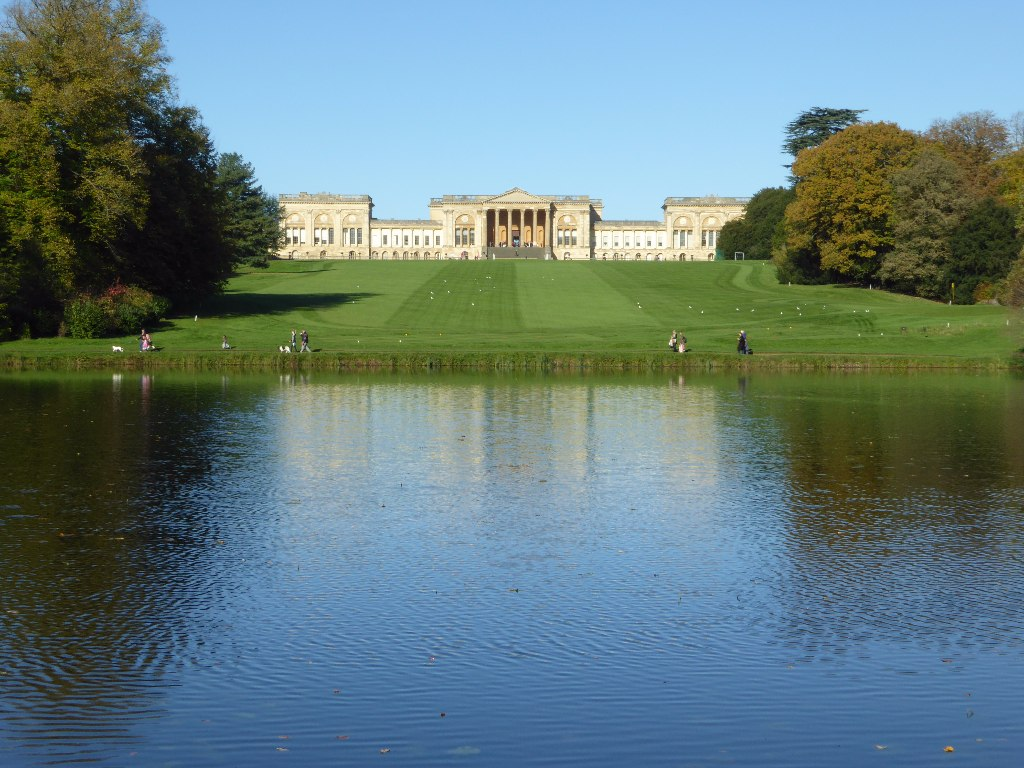
Stowe House, Buckinghamshire.

The eldest son of Richard Grenville (1678–1727) of Wotton Underwood, Buckinghamshire, and of Hester, later Countess Temple, he was educated at Eton College, and in 1734 was returned to Parliament as member for the borough of Buckingham. In 1752, on the death of his mother, he inherited her titles together with the rich estates of Stowe House and Wotton; and he then took the name of Temple in addition to his original surname of Grenville.

On 7 May 1737 he married Anna Chamber, an heiress.

== Seven Years War ==
His most notable political contribution during the Pelham ministry was at the time of the controversy around the Jewish Naturalisation Act 1753. Earl Temple unsuccessfully argued against repealing the act, in the face of significant public hostility towards Jews, and delivered what historian Ioannes Chountis de Fabbri has called “one of the finest speeches of the debate, calling upon the peers to stand as a bulwark against the prejudices of the mob”.

The turning point in his political fortunes was the marriage of his sister Hester in 1754 to William Pitt, later Earl of Chatham. Although Lord Temple had no outstanding qualities, his political career became linked with that of his brother-in-law. In November 1756 Temple became First Lord of the Admiralty in the ministry of Devonshire and Pitt. He was intensely disliked by George II, who dismissed both him and Pitt from office in April 1757. But when the coalition cabinet of Newcastle and Pitt was formed in June of the same year, Temple received the office of privy seal. He was the only member of the cabinet who supported Pitt's proposal to declare war with Spain in 1761, and they resigned together on 5 October.

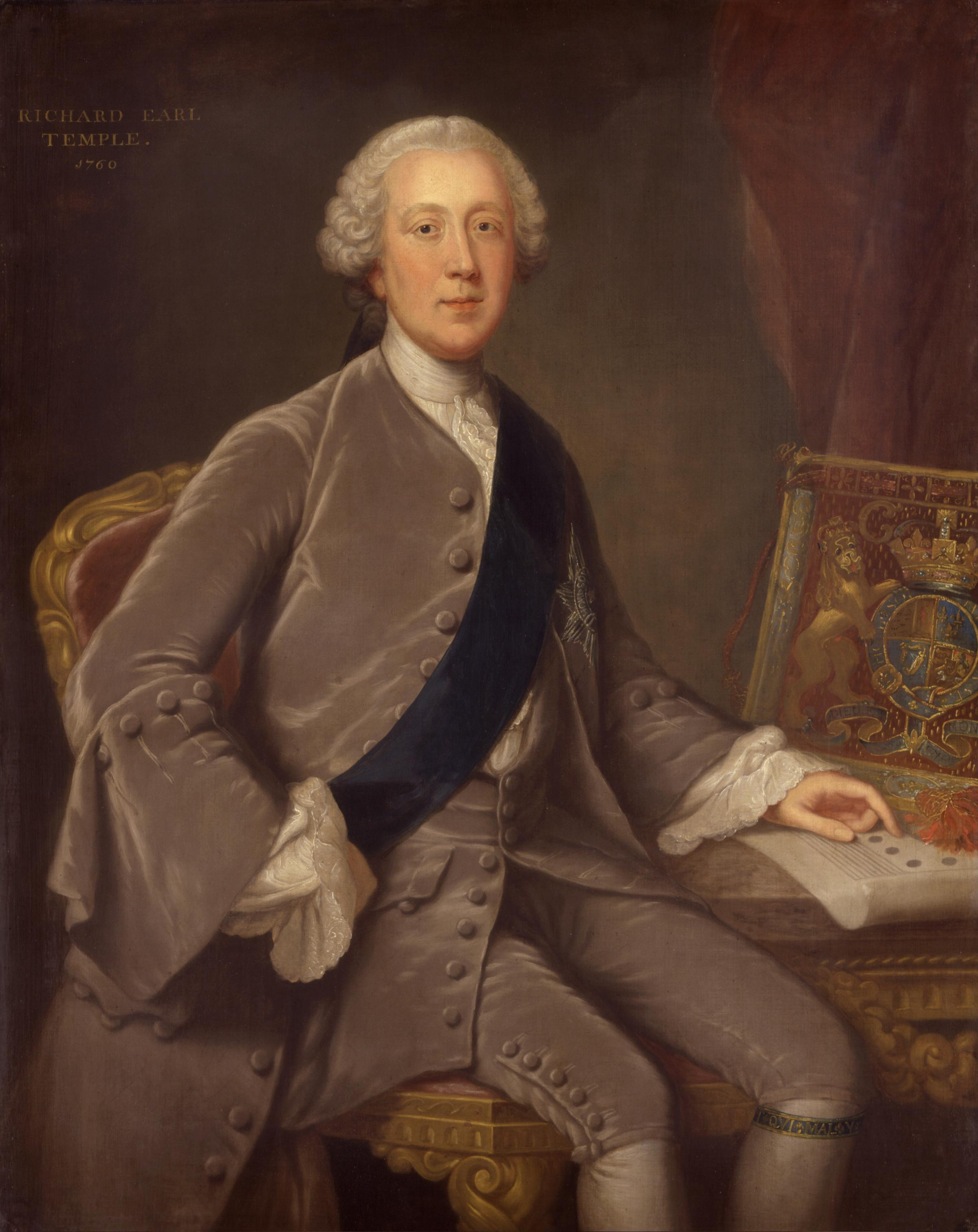
Portrait by William Hoare, c. 1757-60

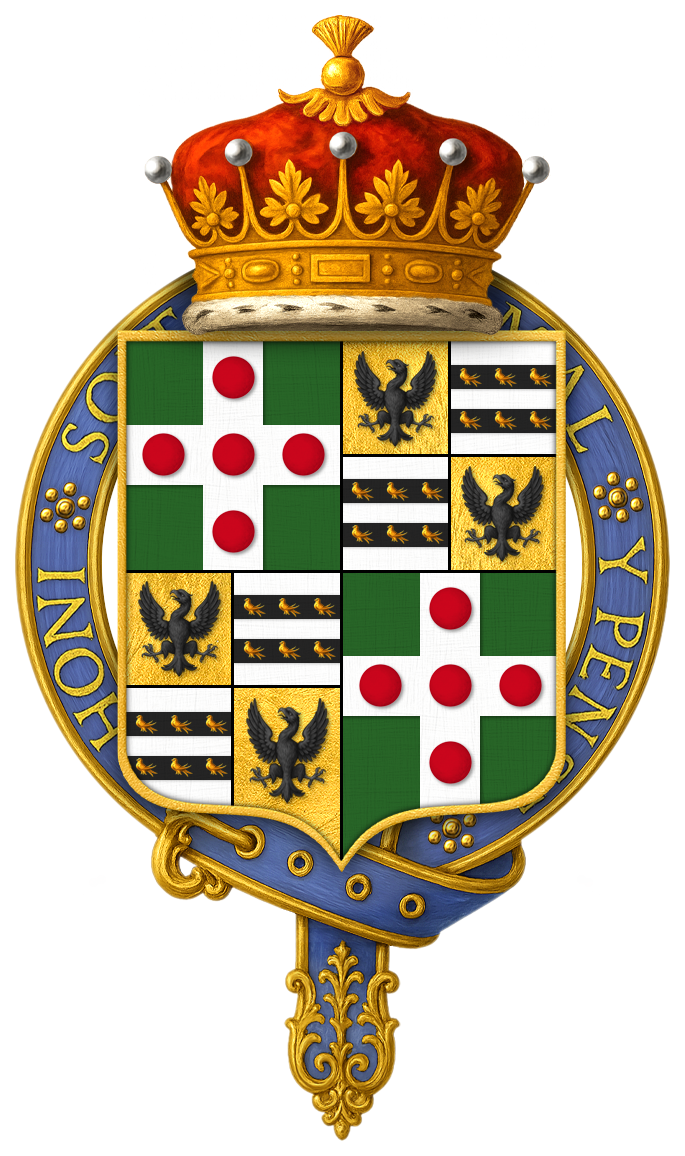
Quartered coat of arms of Richard Grenville-Temple, 2nd Earl Temple, KG

== Later career ==
From this time Temple became one of the most factious of politicians; he himself is said to have avowed that "he loved faction, and had a great deal of money to spare." He was on bad terms with his younger brother, George Grenville, when the latter became first lord of the treasury in April 1763, and he had no place in that ministry; but the brothers were reconciled before 1765, when Temple refused to join the government and persuaded Pitt to refuse likewise. A few weeks later the king offered terms to induce Pitt to form or join an administration; "a ministry directed by that great statesman," wrote William Edward Hartpole Lecky

"would have been beyond all comparison the most advantageous to the country; it had no serious difficulty to encounter, and Pitt himself was now ready to undertake the task, but the evil genius of Lord Temple again prevailed. Without his co-operation Pitt could not, or would not proceed, and Temple absolutely refused to take office even in the foremost place."

Pitt's continued refusal to join the first Rockingham ministry may have been partly due to Temple, but before the end of 1765 the old friendship between the brothers-in-law was dissolving; and when at last in July 1766 Pitt agreed to form a government, Temple refused to join, offended because, although offered the Treasury, he was not to be allowed an equal share with Pitt in nominating to other offices. Temple then began to libel Pitt; and in conjunction with his brother George he concentrated the whole Grenville connection in hostility to the government. After George Grenville's death in 1770 Lord Temple retired almost completely from public life.

Lord Temple was said to have been the author of several anonymous libels, and the inspirer of many more. Macaulay's comparison of him with a mole working below "in some foul, crooked labyrinth whenever a heap of dirt was flung up," from Horace Walpole, was partisan; but his character was rated very low by his contemporaries. In private life he used his wealth with generosity to his relations, friends and dependents. Pitt owed money to him. He was the principal backer behind The North Briton weekly newspaper, and he paid the costs incurred by John Wilkes in litigation. He also provided Wilkes with the freehold qualification which enabled him to stand for Middlesex in the election of 1768.

Although known as a man given to confrontation and strife, Earl Temple did get involved with one of London's most fashionable charities of his time. He served as a vice president for the Foundling Hospital from 1760 to 1768, which was dedicated to the salvation of the large number of children abandoned by their parents in London each day. It cannot be ruled out that his involvement in this charity was motivated purely by compassion. However, it is possible that it also had to do with the achievement of status and access to other notable supporters, such as the Duke of Bedford, Lord Vere Beauclerk, and the Earl of Dartmouth, among others.

In addition to the estates he inherited, Temple gained a considerable fortune by his marriage in 1737 with Anne, daughter and co-heiress of Thomas Chambers of Hanworth, Middlesex; a volume of poems by her was printed at the Strawberry Hill Press in 1764.

== Cricket ==
Like his friend George Montagu-Dunk, 2nd Earl of Halifax, Grenville was keen on cricket. The earliest surviving record of his involvement in the sport comes from August 1741 when, as the patron and captain of the Buckinghamshire county team, he and Halifax organised the Northamptonshire v Buckinghamshire match at Cow Meadow, Northampton.

== Death ==
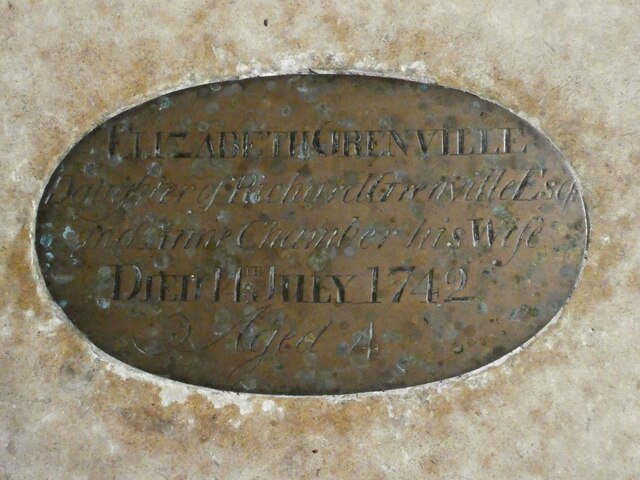
Memorial to Temple's daughter Elizabeth

Earl Temple died early in September 1779, aged 67, after a fall from his phaeton. The only issue of his marriage being a daughter who died in infancy, Temple was succeeded in the earldom by his nephew George Nugent-Temple-Grenville, later 1st Marquess of Buckingham.

== See also ==
- Grenvillite

== Bibliography ==
- Bellot, Leland J. "Grenville, Richard, second Earl Temple (1711–1779)". Oxford Dictionary of National Biography (online ed.). Oxford University Press. doi:10.1093/ref:odnb/11495. (Subscription, Wikipedia Library access or UK public library membership required.)
- Maun, Ian (2009). From Commons to Lord's, Volume One: 1700 to 1750. Roger Heavens. ISBN 978-1-900592-52-9.
- Waghorn, H. T. (1899). Cricket Scores, Notes, etc. (1730–1773). Blackwood.

Attribution

- Endnotes:
  - The Grenville Papers (London, 1852), a considerable portion of which consists of Earl Temple's correspondence;
  - Horace Walpole, Memoirs of the Reign of George II., 3 vols. (London, 1847); Memoirs of the Reign of George III., 4 vols. (London, 1845 and 1894);
  - Earl Waldegrave, Memoirs 1754-8 (London, 1821);
  - Nathaniel William Wraxall, Historical Memoirs, edited by H. B. Wheatley, 5 vols. (London, 1884);
  - Correspondence of Chatham, edited by W. S. Taylor and J. H. Pringle, 4 vols. (London, 1838–40);
  - W. E. H. Lecky, History of England in the Eighteenth Century, vols. ii. and iii. (7 vols., London, 1892).

Parliament of Great Britain
Preceded by John Fane; George Chamberlayne	Member for Buckingham; 1734–1741; With: George Chamberlayne	Succeeded by George Chamberlayne; George Grenville
Preceded by Sir William Stanhope; Sir Thomas Lee, 3rd Bt.	Member for Buckinghamshire; 1741–1747; With: Richard Lowndes	Succeeded by Richard Lowndes; Sir William Stanhope
Preceded by George Chamberlayne; George Grenville	Member for Buckingham; 1747–1752; With: George Grenville	Succeeded by George Grenville; Temple West
Political offices
Preceded by The Lord Anson	First Lord of the Admiralty; 1756–1757	Succeeded by The Earl of Winchilsea and Nottingham
Preceded by The Earl Gower	Lord Privy Seal; 1757–1761	Succeeded by The Duke of Bedford
Honorary titles
Preceded by The Duke of Marlborough	Lord Lieutenant of Buckinghamshire; 1759–1763	Succeeded by The Lord le Despencer
Peerage of Great Britain
Preceded by Hester Temple	Earl Temple; 1752–1779	Succeeded by George Nugent-Temple-Grenville
