= George Chamberlayne =

18th-century British politician

Member of Parliament for Buckingham
- In office 1728–1747

Personal details
- Born: c. 1703
- Died: 14 May 1757 (aged 53–54)
- Party: Whig
- Spouse: Constance Hardy
- Relatives: Alexander Denton (uncle); Thomas Hardy (father-in-law); Wenman Coke (son-in-law)
- Education: St Edmund Hall, Oxford

George Chamberlayne (c. 1703 – 14 May 1757), of Wardington Manor, Oxfordshire and Hillesden, Buckinghamshire, was a British politician who sat in the House of Commons from 1728 to 1747.

== Biography ==
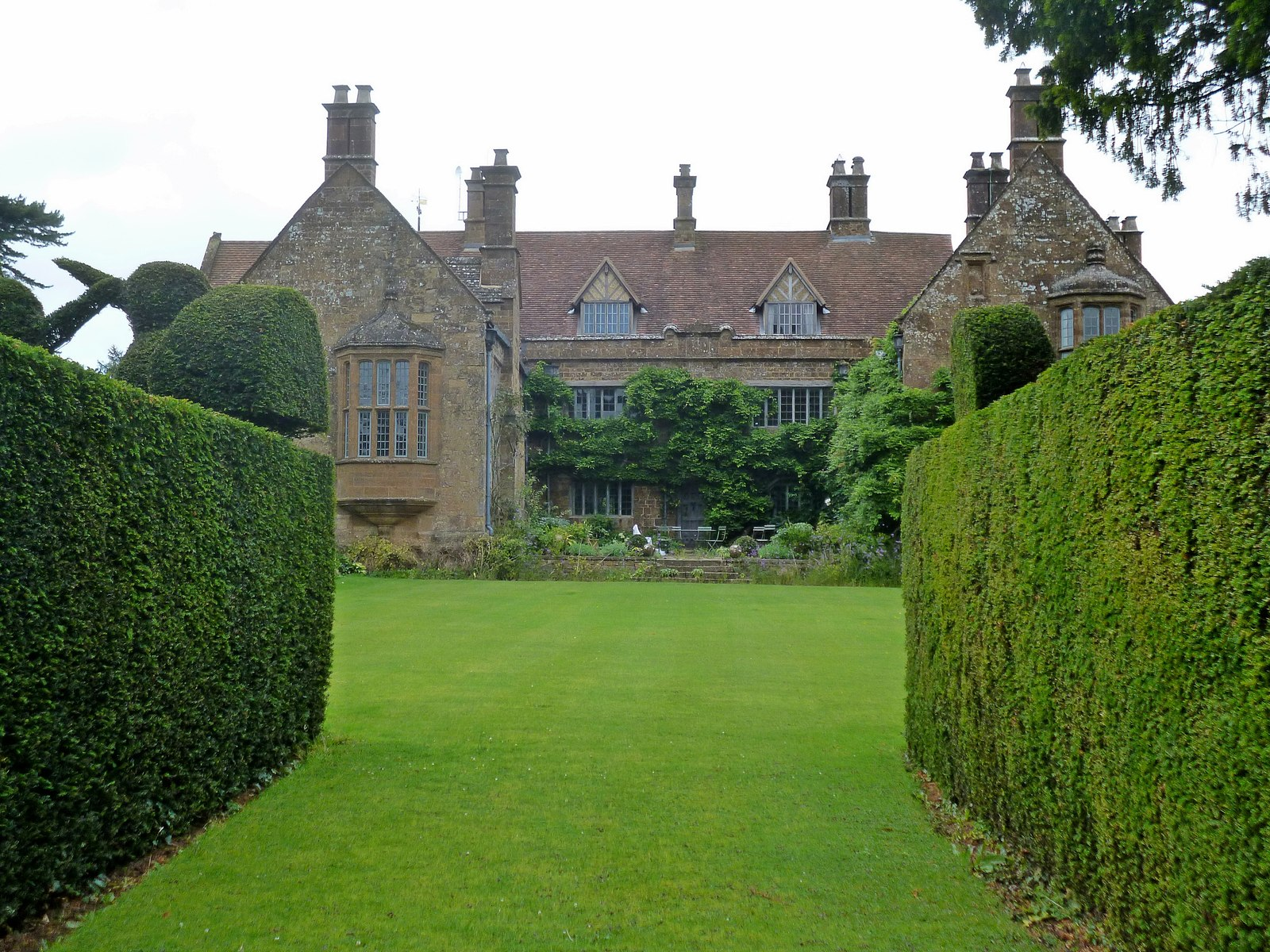
Wardington Manor, 2015

Chamberlayne was the only son of George Chamberlayne of Wardington and his wife Elizabeth Denton, daughter of Alexander Denton, MP of Hillesden. He matriculated at St Edmund Hall, Oxford on 24 March 1721, aged 17. He married Constance Hardy, daughter of Rear-Admiral Sir Thomas Hardy, MP on 27 May 1732.

Chamberlayne was returned as a Whig Member of Parliament for Buckingham at a by-election on 20 February 1728 on the interest of his uncle, Alexander Denton. In Parliament he voted with the Administration on the army 1732 and on the Excise Bill in 1733. He was returned unopposed for Buckingham at the 1734 British general election and went into opposition, probably under Lord Cobham and the Grenvilles. He voted against the Government on the Spanish convention in 1739 and on the chairman of the elections committee in 1741. He was returned again at the 1741 British general election. After Walpole's fall in 1742, there is no record of his voting. He seems to have broken with the Grenvilles, who went over to the Government, and remained in opposition. He was not put forward for Buckingham in 1747 and he never stood again.

Chamberlayne succeeded his uncle Alexander Denton at Hillesden 1740 and took name of Denton. He died on 14 May 1757 leaving one daughter, Elizabeth, who married Wenman Coke.

Parliament of Great Britain
Preceded by Thomas Lewis; John Fane	Member of Parliament for Buckingham; 1728–1747; With: John Fane 1728-1734; Richard Grenville 1734-1741; George Grenville 1741-1747	Succeeded by Richard Grenville; George Grenville
