= Grenvillite =

British political faction

Grenville Whigs
- Leader(s): 2nd Earl Temple; George Grenville; 1st Marquess of Buckingham
- Founded: 1760s; 264 years ago
- Dissolved: 1817; 208 years ago
- Headquarters: Buckinghamshire
- Ideology: Whiggism; Conservatism; Anti-radicalism; Abolitionism; Parliamentarism
- Political position: Right-wing
- National affiliation: Whigs

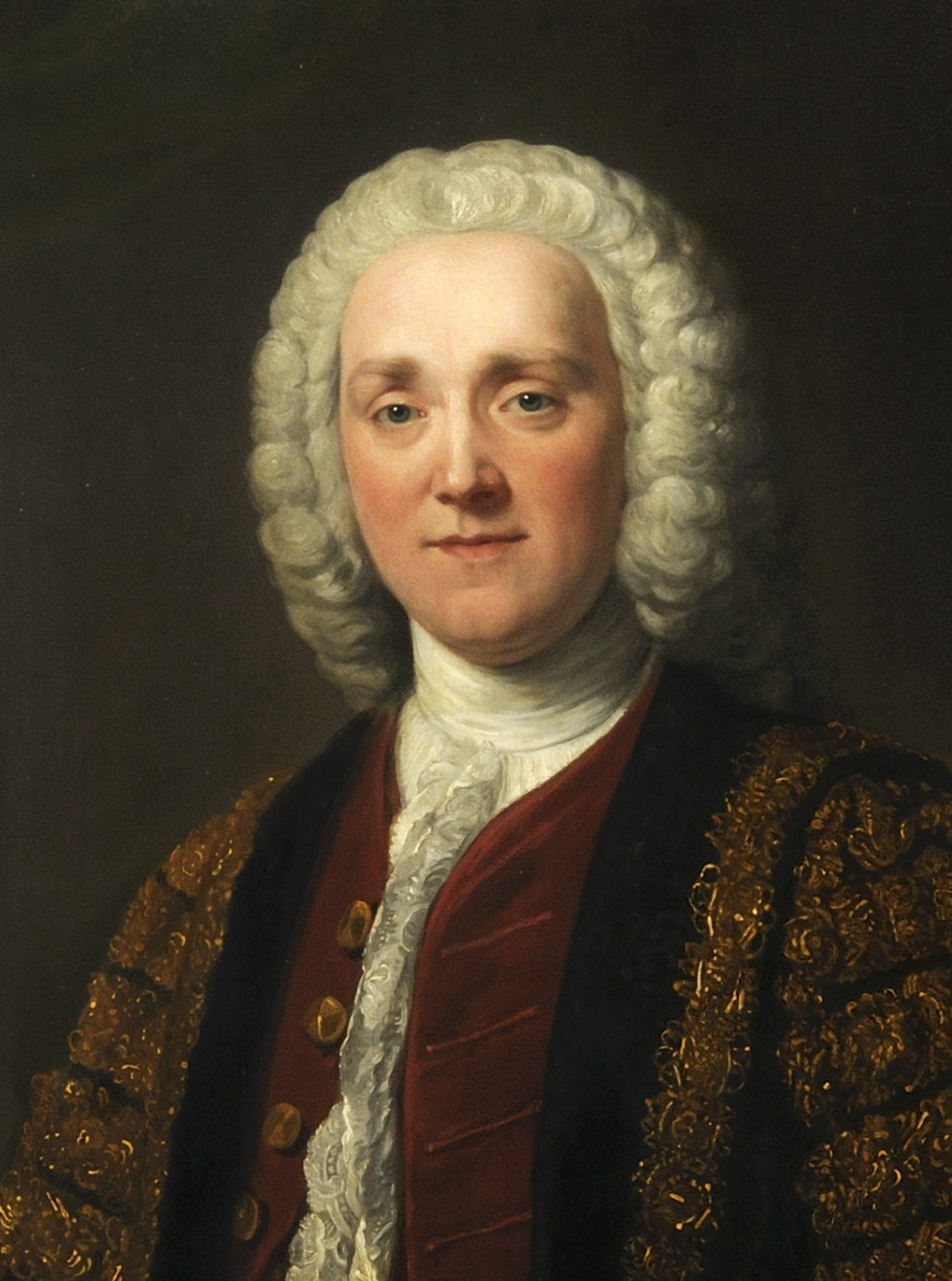
George Grenville painted by William Hoare

The Grenville Whigs (or Grenvillites) were a name given to several British political factions of the 18th and the early 19th centuries, all of which were associated with the important Grenville family of Buckinghamshire.

== Background ==
The Grenville family interest, led by Richard Grenville-Temple, 2nd Earl Temple, which dominated local politics in Buckinghamshire, was prominent in the mid-18th century politics as close allies of Temple's brother-in-law, William Pitt the Elder, 1st Earl Chatham. They had earlier been members of the group of Cobham's Cubs.

However, in the early 1760s, a split occurred in the family as a result of Pitt's dismissal from the government in October 1761. Temple quit the government in protest, but his younger brother, George Grenville, remained in the government, which was now dominated by King George III's favourite, Lord Bute, who served as Leader of the House of Commons.

The followers of the younger Grenville became known as Grenvillites or Grenville Whigs.

== George Grenville ==
George Grenville fully came into his own as a politician in 1763, when he was made Prime Minister, but his own following was not sufficient to form a government. Grenville was forced to rely largely on the Bedford Whigs, supporters of the Duke of Bedford, to staff his ministry.

After Grenville himself was ousted from power in 1765 as a result of conflicts with the King, Grenville moved into opposition and for a time from 1766 to 1767 was the leader of one of three separate opposition factions (the other two were led by the Duke of Bedford and Lord Rockingham).

After Grenville's own death in 1770, the Earl of Suffolk took over the official leadership of Grenville's faction and negotiated Grenvillite entrance into the Lord North ministry in early 1771, but many of Grenville's former supporters refused to follow him and remained in opposition with Chatham and Temple.

== Marquess of Buckingham ==
After Lord Temple's death in 1779, George Grenville's sons, George Nugent-Temple-Grenville, 3rd Earl Temple (from 1784 the Marquess of Buckingham), and William Wyndham Grenville, became the principal figures in the Grenville family. Temple played a key role in bringing down the Fox-North coalition in December 1783 and in bringing his cousin William Pitt the Younger to power as Prime Minister, but he was snubbed for major office. Nevertheless, he and his supporters backed the new ministry, and William Grenville soon became one of Pitt's closest advisors and served for ten years (1791–1801) as Foreign Secretary during the difficult period of the French Revolutionary Wars.

== Lord Grenville ==
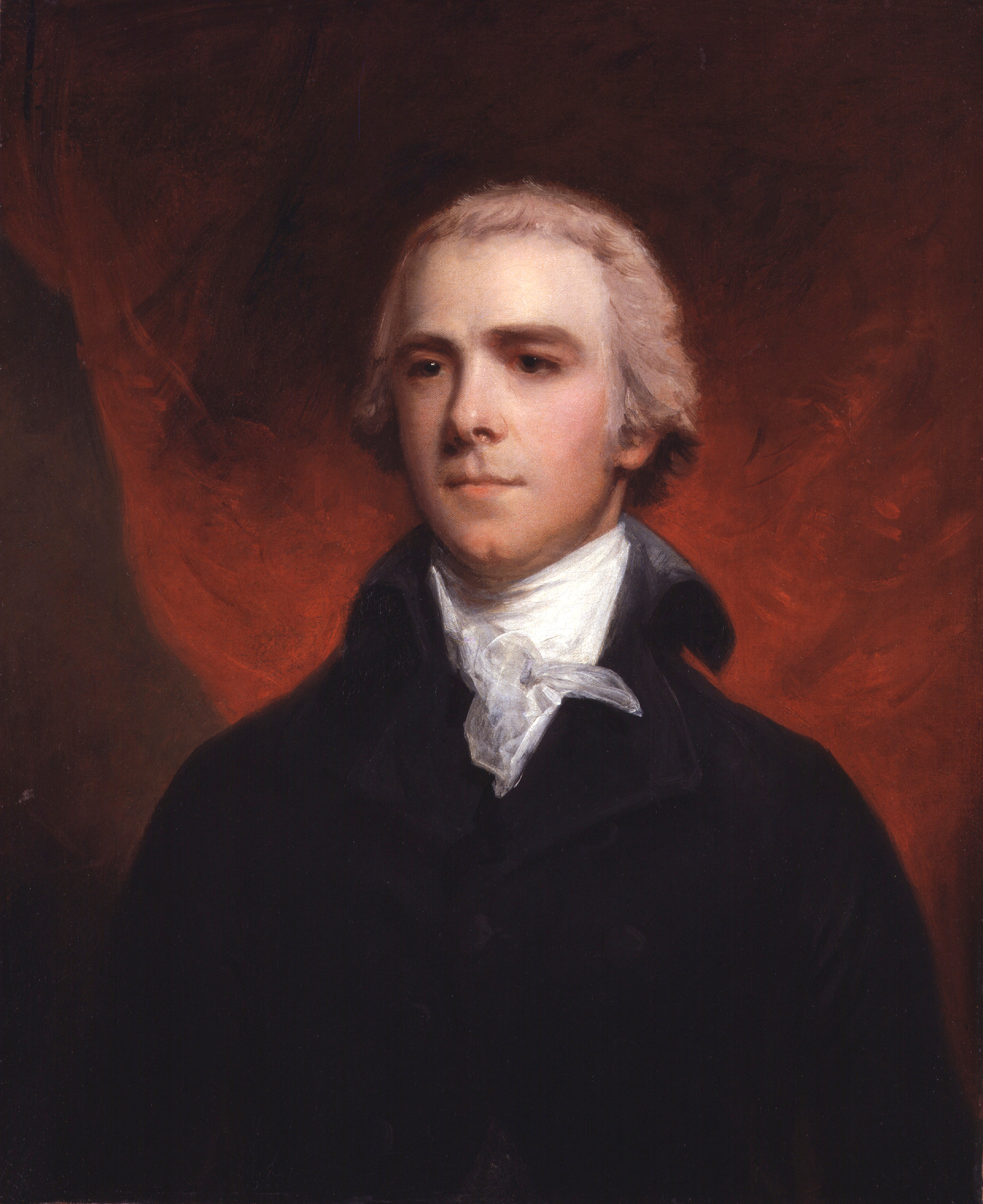
Lord Grenville

The resignation of Pitt's government in 1801 brought about a separation between Pitt and his cousin, William Wyndham Grenville (now Lord Grenville), which was encouraged by Buckingham and his followers, who had always resented Pitt for preventing him from receiving major office. During the Addington government from 1801 to 1804, a number of former supporters of the Pitt government declared their dissatisfaction with the new ministry, came to consider Grenville as their leader and called calling themselves "Grenvilles" or "Grenvillite". Although Grenville himself initially kept his distance from his supposed followers, he had by 1803 acknowledged himself as their leader.

Other than dependents of Lord Buckingham, the group was largely former Portland Whigs who had joined the Pitt government in 1794 and opposed the Addington government's policy of peace with France. Notable members of the group included Lord Spencer, Lord Fitzwilliam, William Windham and Buckingham and Grenville's brother, Thomas Grenville. The new group, aptly nicknamed the "New Opposition", gradually made a tentative alliance with Charles James Fox's "Old Opposition". Their disagreements were many, most apparently on the topic of war with France, wherein the Grenvillites wished to prosecute it more aggressively, but Fox desired peace by negotiation.

When Addington's government fell in 1804, Grenville hoped to form a coalition government that included supporters of himself, Pitt, and Fox, but he was stymied by the King's refusal to countenance a government that included Fox. Unwilling to go into government without his new ally, Grenville chose to remain in opposition when Pitt formed his second government in May of that year.

When Pitt died two years later, however, the King had little choice but to appoint a government including both the "New" and "Old" Opposition, and Grenville became Prime Minister in the Ministry of All the Talents. Although the coalition partners agreed about little besides the abolition of the slave trade, it was really the King's opposition to the ministry that destroyed it in early 1807.

Thereafter, Grenville acted as nominal Leader of the Opposition although Lord Grey, the leader of the Foxites, was essentially equal with him.

== Dissipation ==
After Buckingham's death in 1813 and Grenville's withdrawal from politics in 1817, the Grenvillites remained a distinct political grouping in opposition, but they were by now little more than a pawn of the ambitions of Buckingham's son, the 2nd Marquess of Buckingham. The former Portland Whigs who remained active in politics had by now largely returned to their former Whig allegiances. In 1822, Prime Minister Lord Liverpool bought the group's support for the government by creating Buckingham as Duke of Buckingham and Chandos and bringing in several of his supporters, notably Charles Williams-Wynn, who became President of the Board of Control, into the government. In the years that followed, the Grenvillites disappeared as a distinct political faction.
