= Canningite government, 1827–1828 =

Government of the United Kingdom

- Cabinets of the United Kingdom
- 1827–1828
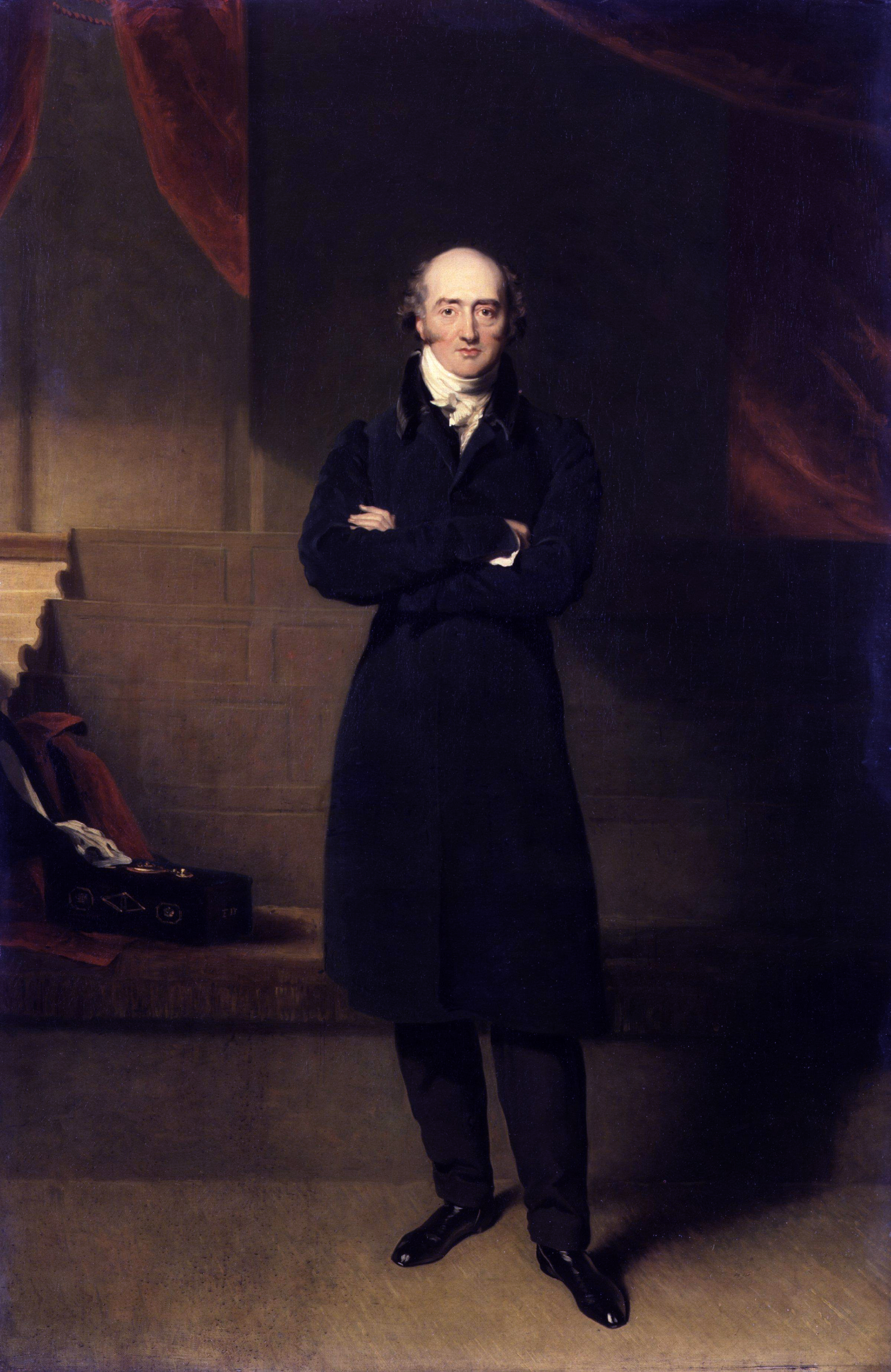
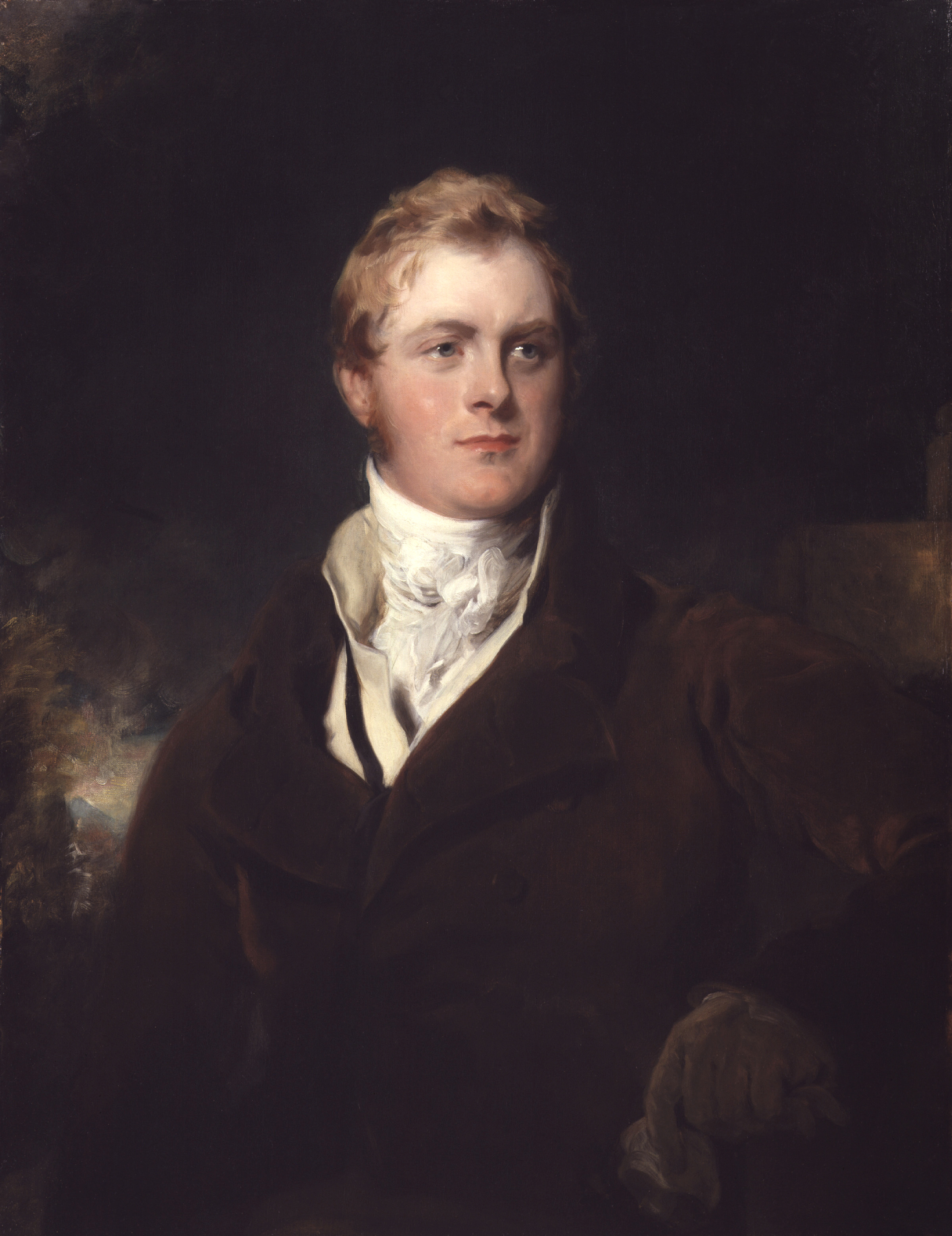
- George Canning (left) led the Government from April 1827. He was succeeded by Lord Goderich (right) upon Canning's death in August.
- Date formed: 9 April 1827
- Date dissolved: 22 January 1828

People and organisations
- Monarch: George IV
- Prime Minister: George Canning (until 8 August 1827); F. J. Robinson, 1st Viscount Goderich
- Member party: Tories
- Status in legislature: Majority government
- Opposition party: Whigs
- Opposition leader: Marquess of Lansdowne

History
- Legislature term: 1826–1830
- Predecessor: Liverpool ministry
- Successor: Wellington–Peel ministry

The Canningites, led by George Canning and then the Viscount Goderich as First Lord of the Treasury, governed the United Kingdom of Great Britain and Ireland from 1827 until 1828.

== Formation ==
On 9 April 1827 the Tory Prime Minister of the United Kingdom, Robert Banks Jenkinson, 2nd Earl of Liverpool, suffered a cerebral haemorrhage. He had been prime minister nearly fifteen years, ever since the assassination of his predecessor Spencer Perceval in May 1812. The man chosen to succeed him was the Foreign Secretary and Leader of the House of Commons, George Canning. Canning was very much on the moderate wing of the Tory Party, and many of the more hard-line members of Liverpool's government, including the Home Secretary, Sir Robert Peel, and national hero Arthur Wellesley, 1st Duke of Wellington (Master-General of the Ordnance), refused to serve under him. Canning's government was therefore recruited from the moderate wing of the Tory Party, known as the Canningites, with the support of several members of the Whig Party.

== Fate ==
Canning, who was in poor health at the time of his appointment, died in office on 8 August 1827, and the Leader of the House of Lords Frederick Robinson, 1st Viscount Goderich succeeded him as prime minister. However, Goderich's government never even met in a session of Parliament, and was replaced by a High Tory government under the Duke of Wellington on 22 January 1828.

== Cabinets ==
=== George Canning's Cabinet, April 1827 – August 1827 ===
- George Canning – First Lord of the Treasury, Chancellor of the Exchequer and Leader of the House of Commons
- John Copley, 1st Baron Lyndhurst – Lord Chancellor
- Dudley Ryder, 1st Earl of Harrowby – Lord President of the Council
- William Bentinck, 4th Duke of Portland – Lord Privy Seal
- William Sturges Bourne – Secretary of State for the Home Department
- John William Ward, 1st Earl of Dudley – Secretary of State for Foreign Affairs
- Frederick John Robinson, 1st Viscount Goderich – Secretary of State for War and the Colonies and Leader of the House of Lords
- William Huskisson – President of the Board of Trade and Treasurer of the Navy
- Charles Williams-Wynn – President of the Board of Control
- Nicholas Vansittart, 1st Baron Bexley – Chancellor of the Duchy of Lancaster
- Henry John Temple, 3rd Viscount Palmerston – Secretary at War
- Henry Petty-Fitzmaurice, 3rd Marquess of Lansdowne – Minister without Portfolio

==== Changes ====
- May 1827 – George Howard, 6th Earl of Carlisle, the First Commissioner of Woods and Forests, enters the Cabinet
- July 1827 – The Duke of Portland becomes a minister without portfolio. Lord Carlisle succeeds him as Lord Privy Seal. W. S. Bourne succeeds Carlisle as First Commissioner of Woods and Forests. Lord Lansdowne succeeds Bourne as Home Secretary. George Tierney, the Master of the Mint, enters the cabinet

=== The Viscount Goderich's Cabinet, September 1827 – January 1828 ===
- Lord Goderich – First Lord of the Treasury and Leader of the House of Lords
- John Copley, 1st Baron Lyndhurst – Lord Chancellor
- William Cavendish-Scott-Bentinck, 4th Duke of Portland – Lord President of the Council
- George Howard, 6th Earl of Carlisle – Lord Privy Seal
- Henry Petty-Fitzmaurice, 3rd Marquess of Lansdowne – Secretary of State for the Home Department
- John William Ward, 1st Earl of Dudley – Secretary of State for Foreign Affairs
- William Huskisson – Secretary of State for War and the Colonies and Leader of the House of Commons
- J. C. Herries – Chancellor of the Exchequer
- Henry Paget, 1st Marquess of Anglesey – Master-General of the Ordnance
- Charles Grant – President of the Board of Trade and Treasurer of the Navy
- Charles Williams-Wynn – President of the Board of Control
- William Sturges Bourne – First Commissioner of Woods and Forests
- Nicholas Vansittart, 1st Baron Bexley – Chancellor of the Duchy of Lancaster
- Henry John Temple, 3rd Viscount Palmerston – Secretary at War

== Full list of ministers ==
This is a list of the members of the government. Members of the Cabinet are indicated by bold typeface.

Office	Name	Date
First Lord of the Treasury	George Canning	10 April 1827 – 8 August 1827
First Lord of the Treasury	Frederick John Robinson, 1st Viscount Goderich	31 August 1827 – 21 January 1828
Chancellor of the Exchequer	George Canning	20 April 1827
Chancellor of the Exchequer	John Charles Herries	3 September 1827
Parliamentary Secretary to the Treasury	Joseph Planta	19 April 1827
Financial Secretary to the Treasury	John Charles Herries	Continued in office
Financial Secretary to the Treasury	Thomas Frankland Lewis	4 September 1827
Junior Lords of the Treasury	Francis Conyngham, Earl of Mount Charles	30 April 1827 – 26 January 1828
Junior Lords of the Treasury	Lord Francis Leveson-Gower	30 April 1827 – 8 September 1827
Junior Lords of the Treasury	Edward Eliot, Baron Eliot	30 April 1827 – 26 January 1828
Junior Lords of the Treasury	Edmund Alexander Macnaghten	30 April 1827 – 26 January 1828
Junior Lords of the Treasury	Maurice FitzGerald	31 July 1827 – 26 January 1828
Lord President of the Council	Dudley Ryder, 1st Earl of Harrowby	Continued in office
Lord President of the Council	William Bentinck, 4th Duke of Portland	17 August 1827
Lord Chancellor	John Copley, 1st Baron Lyndhurst	2 May 1827
Home Secretary	William Sturges Bourne	20 April 1827
Home Secretary	Henry Petty-Fitzmaurice, 3rd Marquess of Lansdowne	16 July 1827
Under-Secretary of State for the Home Department	Spencer Perceval	30 April 1827
Under-Secretary of State for the Home Department	Thomas Spring Rice	16 July 1827
Foreign Secretary	John Ward, 4th Viscount Dudley and Ward (Note: Created Earl of Dudley on 5 October 1827.)	30 April 1827
Under-Secretary of State for Foreign Affairs	Charles Ellis, 6th Baron Howard de Walden	Continued in office
Under-Secretary of State for Foreign Affairs	Ulick John de Burgh, 1st Marquess of Clanricarde	Continued in office until 17 August 1827
Secretary of State for War and the Colonies	Frederick John Robinson, 1st Viscount Goderich	30 April 1827
Secretary of State for War and the Colonies	William Huskisson	3 September 1827
Under-Secretary of State for War and the Colonies	Robert Wilmot Horton	Continued in office
President of the Board of Trade	William Huskisson	Continued in office
President of the Board of Trade	Charles Grant	3 September 1827
Vice-President of the Board of Trade	Charles Grant	Continued in office
President of the Board of Control	Charles Williams-Wynn	Continued in office
Secretary to the Board of Control	Thomas Courtenay	Continued in office
Lord High Admiral	Prince William, Duke of Clarence	17 April 1827
First Secretary to the Admiralty	John Wilson Croker	Continued in office
Lord Privy Seal	William Bentinck, 4th Duke of Portland	30 April 1827
Lord Privy Seal	George Howard, 6th Earl of Carlisle	16 July 1827
Chancellor of the Duchy of Lancaster	Nicholas Vansittart, 1st Baron Bexley	Continued in office
Master-General of the Ordnance	Henry Paget, 1st Marquess of Anglesey	30 April 1827
Lieutenant-General of the Ordnance	Sir William Henry Clinton	Continued in office
Treasurer of the Ordnance	William Holmes	Continued in office
Surveyor-General of the Ordnance	Sir Edward Owen	14 May 1827
Clerk of the Ordnance	Sir George Clerk, 6th Baronet	4 May 1827
Clerk of the Deliveries of the Ordnance	Edmund Phipps	Continued in office
Storekeeper of the Ordnance	Mark Singleton	Continued in office
Treasurer of the Navy	William Huskisson	Continued in office
Treasurer of the Navy	Charles Grant	10 September 1827
Secretary at War	Henry John Temple, 3rd Viscount Palmerston	Continued in office
Master of the Mint	George Tierney	29 May 1827
Paymaster of the Forces	William Vesey-FitzGerald	Continued in office
First Commissioner of Woods and Forests	George Howard, 6th Earl of Carlisle	30 May 1827
First Commissioner of Woods and Forests	William Sturges Bourne	23 July 1827
Ministers without Portfolio	Henry Petty-Fitzmaurice, 3rd Marquess of Lansdowne (Note: Appointed Home Secretary July 1827.)	May 1827
Ministers without Portfolio	William Bentinck, 4th Duke of Portland (Note: Appointed Lord President August 1827.)	May 1827
Lord Lieutenant of Ireland	Richard Wellesley, 1st Marquess Wellesley	Continued in office
Chief Secretary for Ireland	William Lamb	29 April 1827
Attorney General	Sir James Scarlett	27 April 1827
Solicitor General	Nicolas Conyngham Tindal	Continued in office
Judge Advocate General	James Abercromby	12 May 1827
Lord Advocate	Sir William Rae, 3rd Baronet	Continued in office
Solicitor General for Scotland	John Hope	Continued in office
Attorney General for Ireland	Henry Joy	18 June 1827
Solicitor General for Ireland	John Doherty	18 June 1827
Lord Steward of the Household	Henry Conyngham, 1st Marquess Conyngham	Continued in office
Lord Chamberlain of the Household	William Cavendish, 6th Duke of Devonshire	5 May 1827
Vice-Chamberlain of the Household	Sir Samuel Hulse	5 May 1827
Master of the Horse	George Osborne, 6th Duke of Leeds	4 May 1827
Treasurer of the Household	Sir William Henry Fremantle	Continued in office
Comptroller of the Household	Lord George Beresford	Continued in office
Captain of the Gentlemen Pensioners	Henry Devereux, 14th Viscount Hereford	1827
Captain of the Yeomen of the Guard	George Parker, 4th Earl of Macclesfield	Continued in office
Master of the Buckhounds	William Wellesley-Pole, 1st Baron Maryborough	Continued in office

Notes

Preceded by Liverpool ministry	Government of the United Kingdom; 1827–1828	Succeeded by Wellington–Peel ministry
