= Wellington–Peel ministry =

- 1828–1830
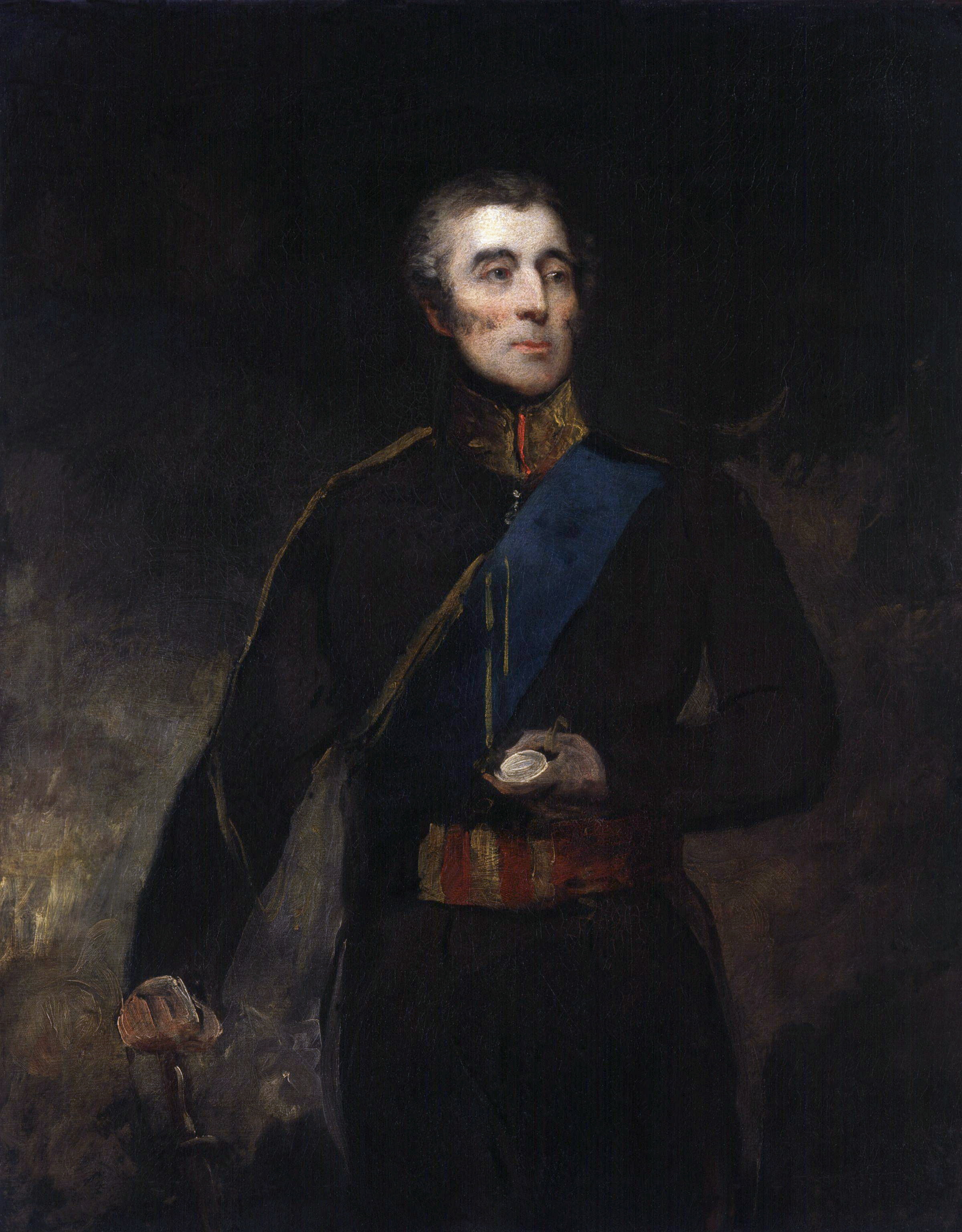
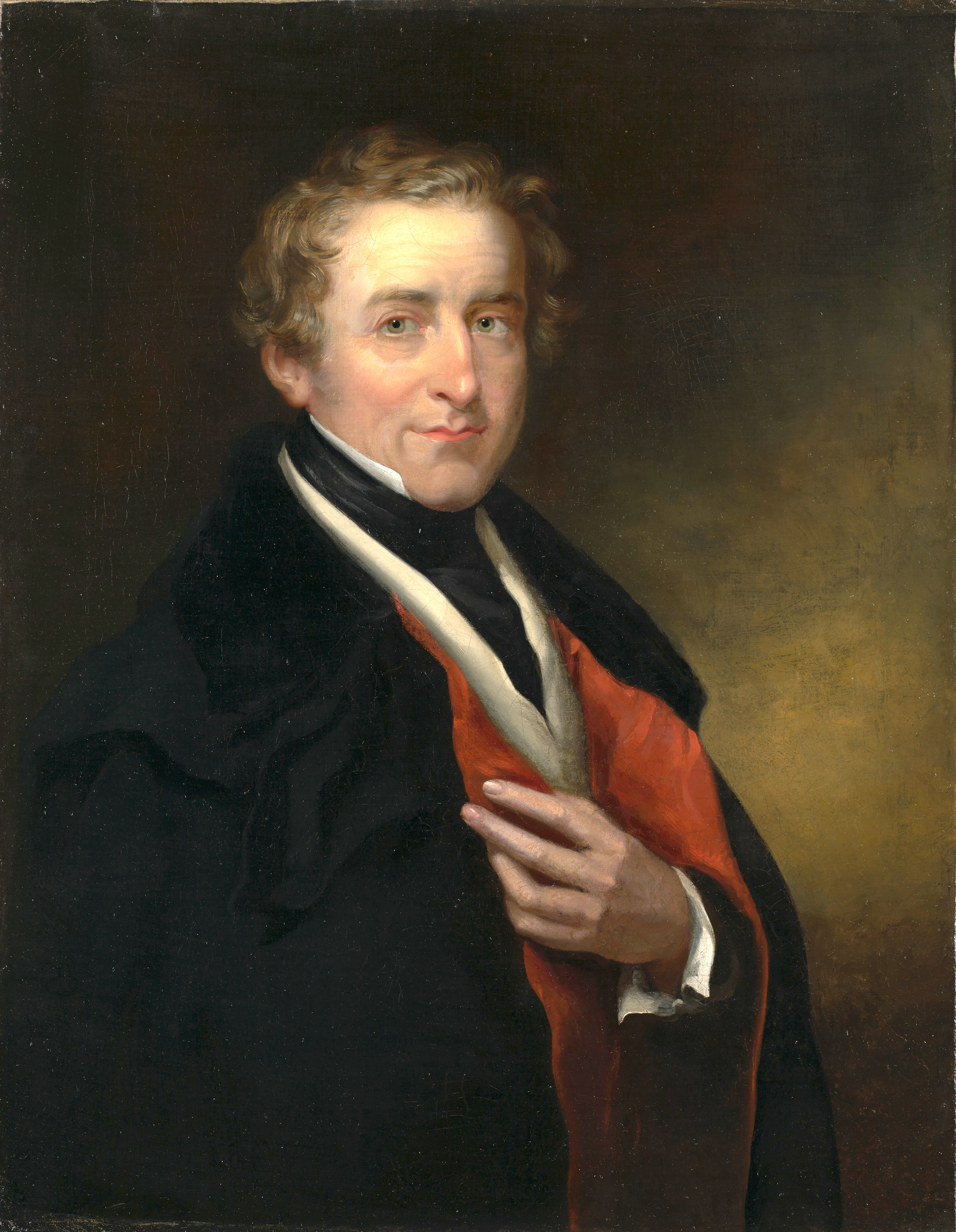
- Date formed: 22 January 1828
- Date dissolved: 16 November 1830

People and organisations
- Monarch: George IV (1828–1830); William IV (1830)
- Prime Minister: Duke of Wellington
- Home Secretary: Sir Robert Peel
- Total no. of members: 92 appointments
- Member party: Tories
- Status in legislature: Majority (1828–1830); Minority (1830)
- Opposition party: Whigs
- Opposition leaders: Vacant (1828–1830); Lord Althorp (1830) in the House of Commons; Lord Lansdowne in the House of Lords

History
- Outgoing election: 1830 general election
- Legislature terms: 8th UK Parliament lost a vote of confidence
- Predecessor: Goderich ministry
- Successor: Grey ministry

The Conservative government of the United Kingdom of Great Britain and Ireland that began in 1828 and ended in 1830 was led by Arthur Wellesley, 1st Duke of Wellington in the House of Lords and Robert Peel in the House of Commons.

== History ==
=== Formation ===
The Duke of Wellington finally came to power after the abortive attempt at a Canningite-Whig coalition government came to an end with Viscount Goderich's resignation in January 1828. The government included several men from the previous administration, but four of the most important, Lords Dudley and Palmerston and Messrs Huskisson and Grant, resigned in May 1828.

=== Fate ===
The Duke oversaw the introduction of Catholic Emancipation, but remained resolutely opposed to parliamentary reform, and as a result lost a vote of no confidence on 15 November 1830. The Whigs under Lord Grey then formed the government which was to pass the Great Reform Act.

== Cabinet ==
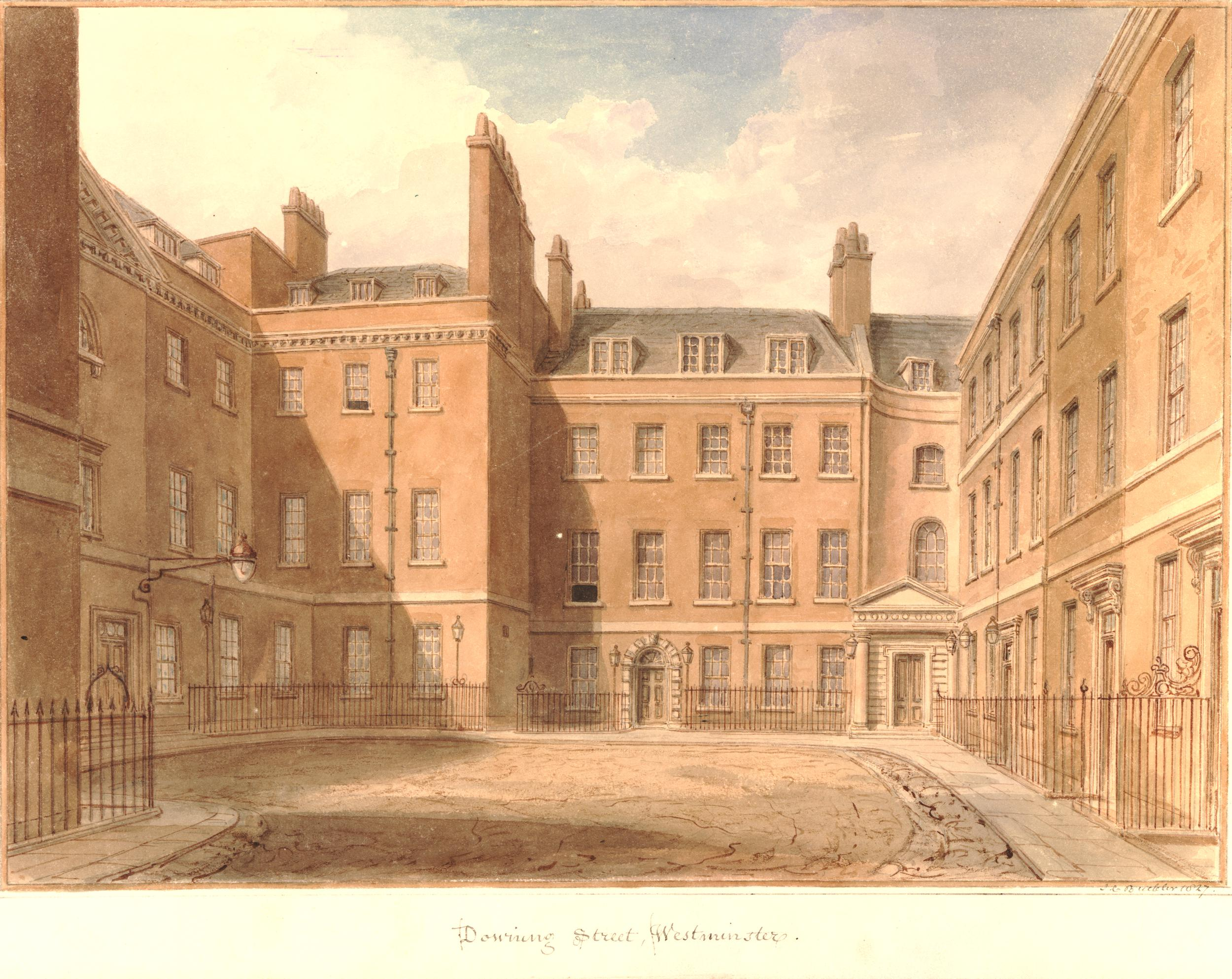
During his first seven months as prime minister, the Duke chose not to live in the official residence at 10 Downing Street, finding it too small. He moved in only because his own home, Apsley House, required extensive renovations

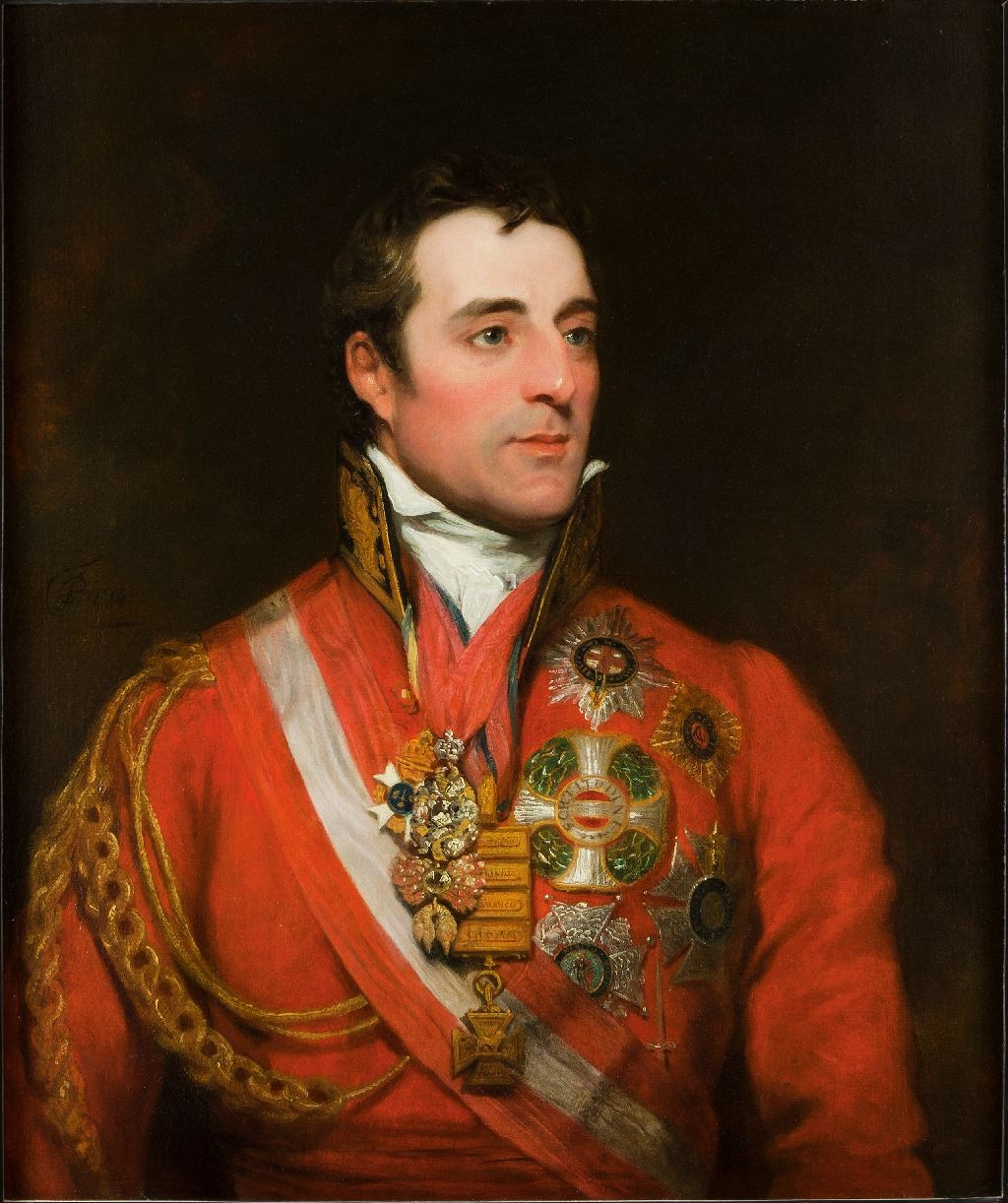
Portrait of the Duke of Wellington by Thomas Phillips

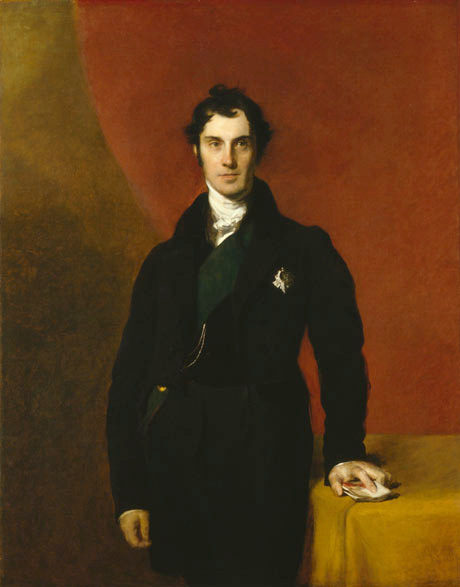
Portrait of Lord Aberdeen by Thomas Lawrence, 1830. Lord Aberdeen served as Foreign Secretary.

=== January 1828 – November 1830 ===
Office	Name	Term
First Lord of the Treasury; Leader of the House of Lords	Arthur Wellesley, 1st Duke of Wellington	January 1828 – November 1830
Lord Chancellor	John Copley, 1st Baron Lyndhurst	January 1828 – November 1830
Lord President of the Council	Henry Bathurst, 3rd Earl Bathurst	January 1828 – November 1830
Lord Privy Seal	Edward Law, 2nd Baron Ellenborough	January 1828 – June 1829
Lord Privy Seal	James St Clair-Erskine, 2nd Earl of Rosslyn	June 1829 – November 1830
Chancellor of the Exchequer	Henry Goulburn	January 1828 – November 1830
Home Secretary; Leader of the House of Commons	Robert Peel	January 1828 – November 1830
Foreign Secretary	John Ward, 1st Earl of Dudley	January 1828 – June 1828
Foreign Secretary	George Hamilton-Gordon, 4th Earl of Aberdeen	June 1828 – November 1830
Secretary of State for War and the Colonies	William Huskisson	January 1828 – May 1828
Secretary of State for War and the Colonies	Sir George Murray	May 1828 – November 1830
First Lord of the Admiralty	Robert Dundas, 2nd Viscount Melville	September 1828 – November 1830
Master-General of the Ordnance	Henry Paget, 1st Marquess of Anglesey	January 1828 – April 1828
Master-General of the Ordnance	William Carr Beresford, 1st Viscount Beresford	April 1828 – November 1830
President of the Board of Trade	Charles Grant	January 1828 – June 1828
President of the Board of Trade	William Vesey-Fitzgerald	June 1828 – February 1830
President of the Board of Trade	John Charles Herries	February 1830 – November 1830
President of the Board of Control	Charles Williams-Wynn	January 1828 – July 1828
President of the Board of Control	Robert Dundas, 2nd Viscount Melville	July 1828 – September 1828
President of the Board of Control	Edward Law, 2nd Baron Ellenborough	September 1828 – November 1830
Master of the Mint	John Charles Herries	January 1828 – November 1830
Chancellor of the Duchy of Lancaster	George Hamilton-Gordon, 4th Earl of Aberdeen	January 1828 – June 1828
Chancellor of the Duchy of Lancaster	Charles Arbuthnot	June 1828 – November 1830
First Commissioner of Woods and Forests	Charles Arbuthnot	February 1828 – June 1828
First Commissioner of Woods and Forests	William Lowther, Viscount Lowther	June 1828 – November 1830
Paymaster of the Forces	William Vesey-Fitzgerald	January 1828 – July 1828
Paymaster of the Forces	John Calcraft	July 1828 – November 1830
Secretary at War	Henry Temple, 3rd Viscount Palmerston	January 1828 – May 1828
Secretary at War	Sir Henry Hardinge	May 1828 – July 1830
Secretary at War	Lord Francis Leveson-Gower	July 1830 – November 1830

== Full list of ministers ==
Members of the Cabinet are indicated by bold face.

Office	Name	Date
Prime Minister First Lord of the Treasury Leader of the House of Lords	Arthur Wellesley, 1st Duke of Wellington	22 January 1828
Chancellor of the Exchequer	Henry Goulburn	22 January 1828
Parliamentary Secretary to the Treasury	Joseph Planta	Continued in office
Financial Secretary to the Treasury	George Robert Dawson	28 January 1828
Junior Lords of the Treasury	Lord Granville Somerset	26 January 1828 – 24 November 1830
Junior Lords of the Treasury	Francis Conyngham, Earl of Mount Charles	26 January 1828 – 24 April 1830
Junior Lords of the Treasury	Edward Eliot, Baron Eliot	26 January 1828 – 24 November 1830
Junior Lords of the Treasury	Edmund Alexander Macnaghten	26 January 1828 – 24 July 1830
Junior Lords of the Treasury	George Bankes	24 April 1830 – 24 November 1830
Junior Lords of the Treasury	William Yates Peel	24 July 1830 – 24 November 1830
Lord President of the Council	Henry Bathurst, 3rd Earl Bathurst	26 January 1828
Lord Chancellor	John Copley, 1st Baron Lyndhurst	Continued in office
Secretary of State for the Home Department Leader of the House of Commons	Robert Peel	26 January 1828
Under-Secretary of State for the Home Department	Thomas Spring Rice	Continued in office
Under-Secretary of State for the Home Department	William Yates Peel	5 April 1828
Under-Secretary of State for the Home Department	Sir George Clerk, 6th Baronet	5 August 1830
Secretary of State for Foreign Affairs	John Ward, 1st Earl of Dudley	Continued in office
Secretary of State for Foreign Affairs	George Hamilton-Gordon, 4th Earl of Aberdeen	2 June 1828
Parliamentary Under-Secretary of State for Foreign Affairs	Charles Ellis, 6th Baron Howard de Walden	Continued in office
Parliamentary Under-Secretary of State for Foreign Affairs	Cospatrick Douglas-Home, Lord Dunglass	28 June 1828
Secretary of State for War and the Colonies	William Huskisson	Continued in office
Secretary of State for War and the Colonies	Sir George Murray	30 May 1828
Under-Secretary of State for War and the Colonies	Lord Francis Leveson-Gower	26 January 1828
Under-Secretary of State for War and the Colonies	Horace Twiss	30 May 1828
President of the Board of Trade	Charles Grant	Continued in office
President of the Board of Trade	William Vesey-Fitzgerald	11 June 1828
President of the Board of Trade	John Charles Herries	2 February 1830
Vice-President of the Board of Trade	Thomas Frankland Lewis	5 February 1828
Vice-President of the Board of Trade	Thomas Peregrine Courtenay	30 May 1828
President of the Board of Control	Charles Williams-Wynn	Continued in office
President of the Board of Control	Robert Dundas, 2nd Viscount Melville	31 July 1828
President of the Board of Control	Edward Law, 2nd Baron Ellenborough	24 September 1828
Secretary to the Board of Control	Thomas Peregrine Courtenay	Continued in office
Secretary to the Board of Control	George Bankes	2 May 1828
Secretary to the Board of Control	John Stuart-Wortley	16 February 1830
Lord High Admiral	The Duke of Clarence	Continued in office (Note: Office of Lord High Admiral put into commission from 19 September 1828.)
First Lord of the Admiralty	Robert Dundas, 2nd Viscount Melville	17 September 1828
First Secretary to the Admiralty	John Wilson Croker	Continued in office
Civil Lords of the Admiralty	Sir George Clerk, 6th Baronet	19 September 1828 – 31 July 1830
Civil Lords of the Admiralty	George Pratt, Earl of Brecknock	19 September 1828 – 15 July 1829
Civil Lords of the Admiralty	Francis Stewart, Viscount Castlereagh	15 July 1829 – 25 November 1830
Civil Lords of the Admiralty	Charles Ross	31 July 1830 – 25 November 1830
Lord Privy Seal	Edward Law, 2nd Baron Ellenborough	26 January 1828
Lord Privy Seal	James St Clair-Erskine, 2nd Earl of Rosslyn	10 June 1829
Chancellor of the Duchy of Lancaster	George Hamilton-Gordon, 4th Earl of Aberdeen	26 January 1828
Chancellor of the Duchy of Lancaster	Charles Arbuthnot	2 June 1828
Master-General of the Ordnance	Henry Paget, 1st Marquess of Anglesey	Continued in office
Master-General of the Ordnance	William Carr Beresford, 1st Viscount Beresford	28 April 1828
Lieutenant-General of the Ordnance	Sir William Henry Clinton	Continued in office
Lieutenant-General of the Ordnance	Lord Edward Somerset	8 July 1829 (Note: Office of Lieutenant-General of the Ordnance vacant after 1830.)
Treasurer of the Ordnance	William Holmes	Continued in office
Surveyor-General of the Ordnance	Sir Herbert Taylor	24 March 1828
Surveyor-General of the Ordnance	Sir Henry Fane	3 April 1829
Clerk of the Ordnance	Sir George Clerk, 6th Baronet	Continued in office
Clerk of the Ordnance	Spencer Perceval	4 August 1828
Clerk of the Deliveries of the Ordnance	Edmund Phipps	Continued in office (Note: Office of Clerk of the Deliveries of the Ordnance abolished in 1830.)
Storekeeper of the Ordnance	Mark Singleton	Continued in office
Storekeeper of the Ordnance	Frederick William Trench	4 June 1829
Treasurer of the Navy	William Vesey-Fitzgerald	25 February 1828
Secretary at War	Henry John Temple, 3rd Viscount Palmerston	Continued in office
Secretary at War	Sir Henry Hardinge	31 May 1828
Secretary at War	Lord Francis Leveson-Gower	30 July 1830
Master of the Mint	John Charles Herries	12 February 1828
Chief Secretary for Ireland	William Lamb	Continued in office
Chief Secretary for Ireland	Lord Francis Leveson-Gower	21 June 1828
Chief Secretary for Ireland	Sir Henry Hardinge	30 July 1830
Lord Lieutenant of Ireland	Henry Paget, 1st Marquess of Anglesey	1 March 1828
Lord Lieutenant of Ireland	Hugh Percy, 3rd Duke of Northumberland	6 March 1829
Paymaster of the Forces	William Vesey-Fitzgerald	Continued in office
Paymaster of the Forces	John Calcraft	15 July 1828
Postmaster General	William Montagu, 5th Duke of Manchester	Continued in office
First Commissioner of Woods and Forests	Charles Arbuthnot	11 February 1828
First Commissioner of Woods and Forests	William Lowther, Viscount Lowther	14 June 1828
Attorney General	Sir Charles Wetherell	19 February 1828
Attorney General	Sir James Scarlett	27 April 1829
Solicitor General	Sir Nicholas Conyngham Tindal	Continued in office
Solicitor General	Sir Edward Burtenshaw Sugden	29 June 1829
Judge Advocate General	Sir John Beckett, 2nd Baronet	2 February 1828
Lord Advocate	Sir William Rae, 3rd Baronet	Continued in office
Solicitor General for Scotland	John Hope	Continued in office
Attorney General for Ireland	Henry Joy	Continued in office
Solicitor General for Ireland	John Doherty	Continued in office
Lord Steward of the Household	Henry Conyngham, 1st Marquess Conyngham	Continued in office
Lord Chamberlain of the Household	James Graham, 3rd Duke of Montrose	18 February 1828
Vice-Chamberlain of the Household	Sir Samuel Hulse	Continued in office
Vice-Chamberlain of the Household	George Chichester, Earl of Belfast	24 July 1830
Master of the Horse	George Osborne, 6th Duke of Leeds	Continued in office
Treasurer of the Household	Sir William Henry Fremantle	Continued in office
Comptroller of the Household	Lord George Thomas Beresford	Continued in office
Captain of the Yeomen of the Guard	George Parker, 4th Earl of Macclesfield	Continued in office
Captain of the Gentlemen Pensioners	Henry Devereux, 14th Viscount Hereford	Continued in office
Master of the Buckhounds	William Wellesley-Pole, 1st Baron Maryborough	Continued in office

Notes

Preceded by Goderich ministry	Government of the United Kingdom; 1828–1830	Succeeded by Grey ministry
