= Whig government, 1830–1834 =

Government of the United Kingdom

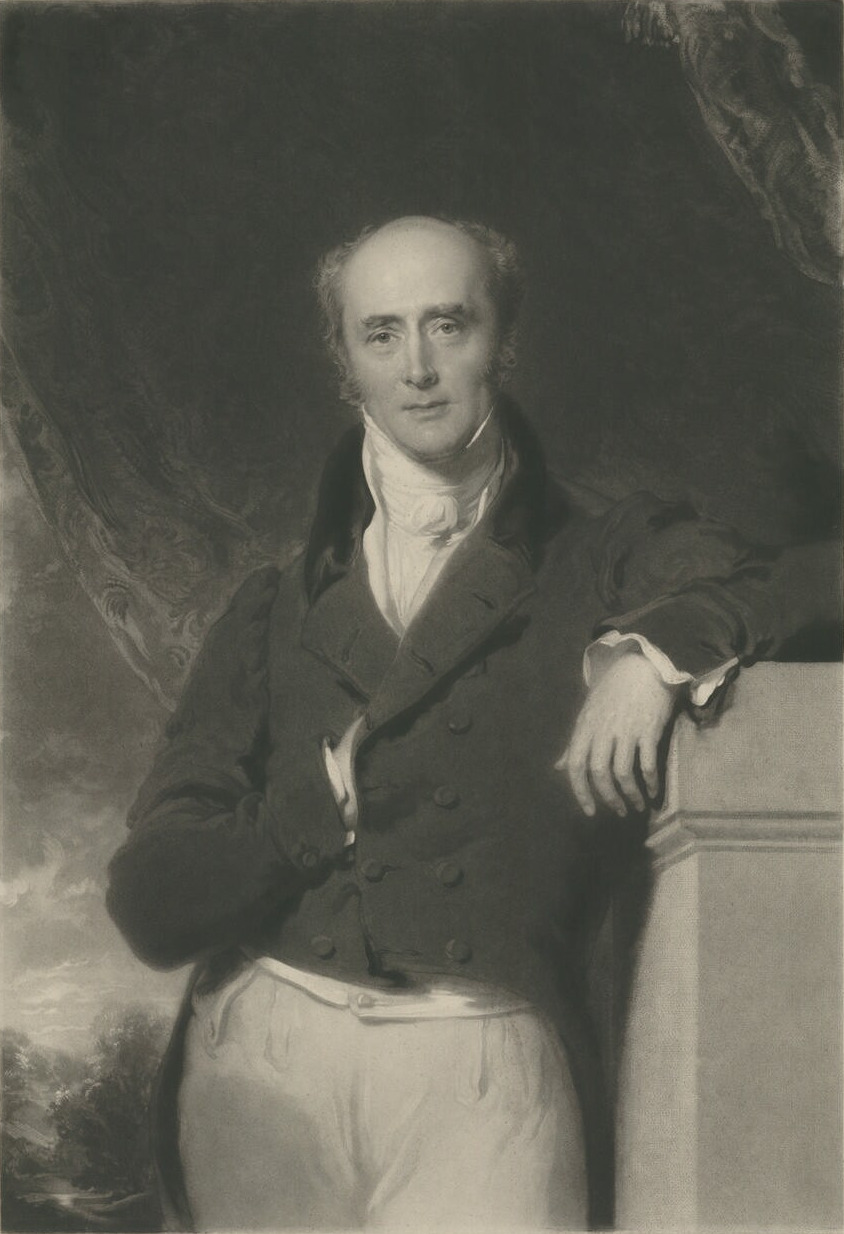
Lord Grey led the Government from 1830 to 1834. He was succeeded by Lord Melbourne upon his resignation.

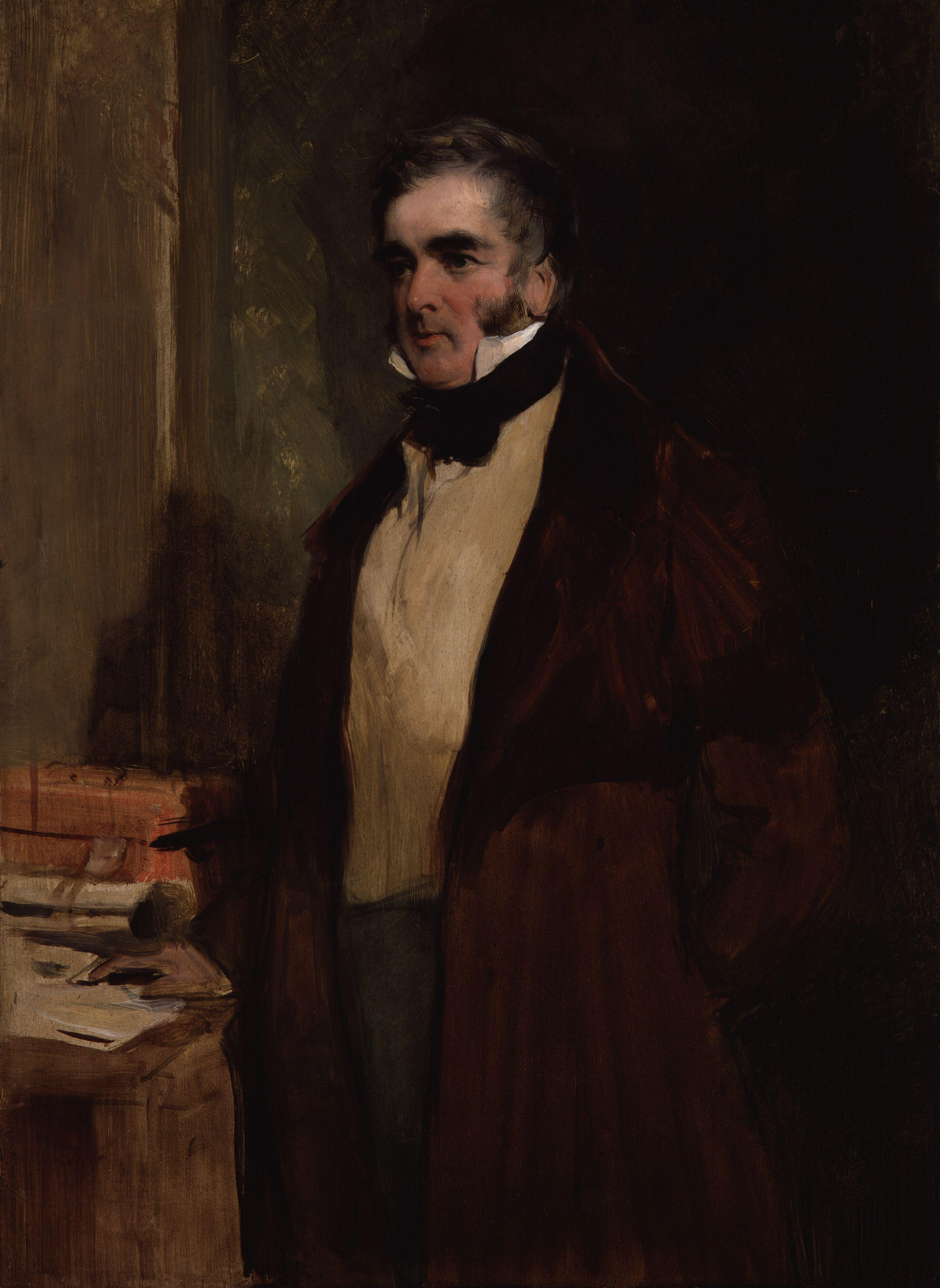
Melbourne led the Government following the resignation of his predecessor in July 1834. He was dismissed in November.

The Whig government of the United Kingdom of Great Britain and Ireland that began in November 1830 and ended in November 1834 consisted of two ministries: the Grey ministry (from 1830 to July 1834) and then the first Melbourne ministry.

== History ==
The first wholly Whig government since 1783 came to power after the Duke of Wellington's Tory government lost a vote of no confidence on 15 November 1830. The government, led by the Charles Grey, 2nd Earl Grey, passed the Great Reform Act in 1832, which brought about parliamentary reform, and enacted the Slavery Abolition Act 1833, bringing about the abolition of slavery in most of the British Empire.

However, King William IV dismissed Grey's successor William Lamb, 2nd Viscount Melbourne in 1834 and asked Sir Robert Peel to form a government. Peel was out of the country at the time, so the Duke of Wellington formed a caretaker government.

== Cabinets ==
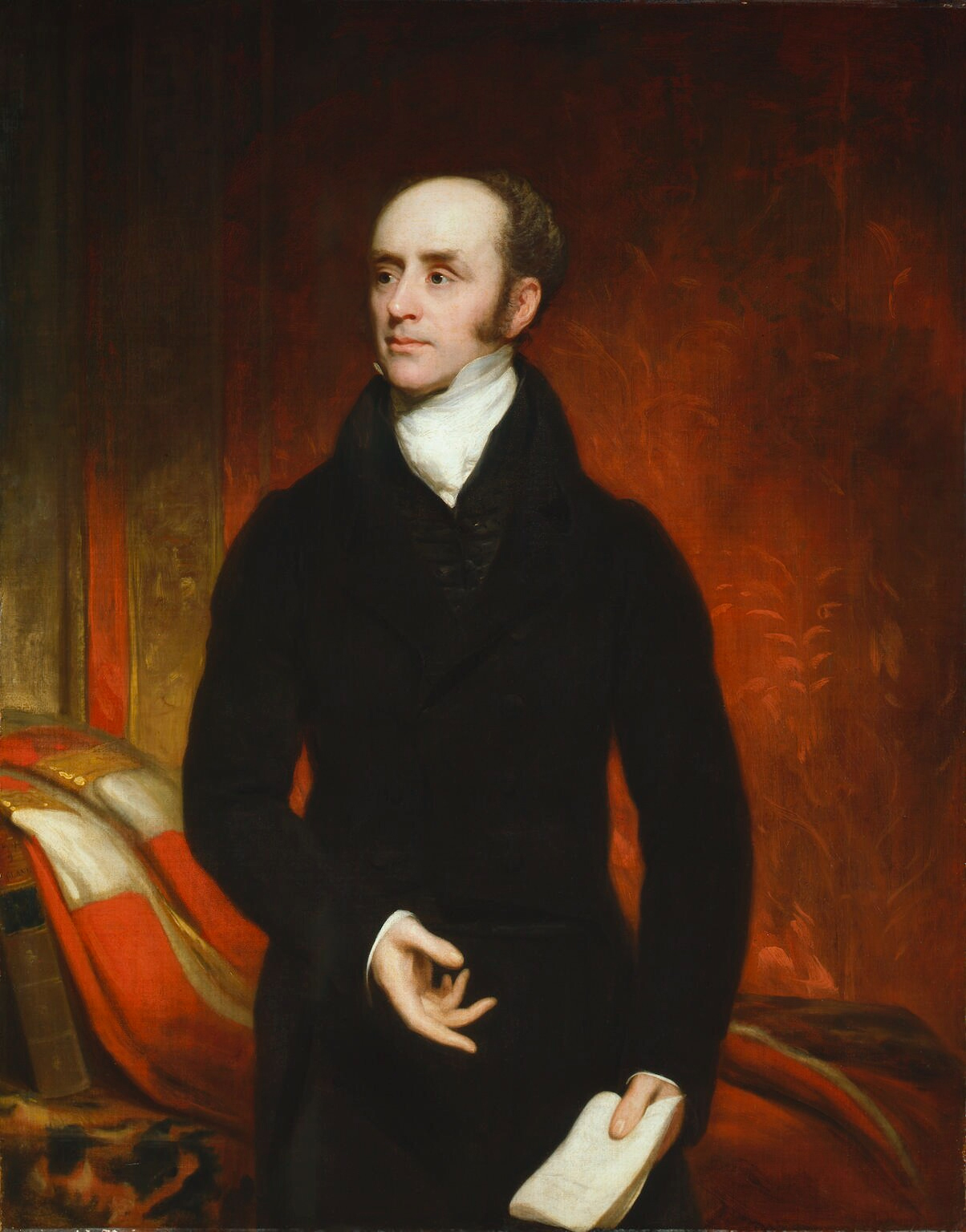
Portrait of Earl Grey by Thomas Phillips, 1820

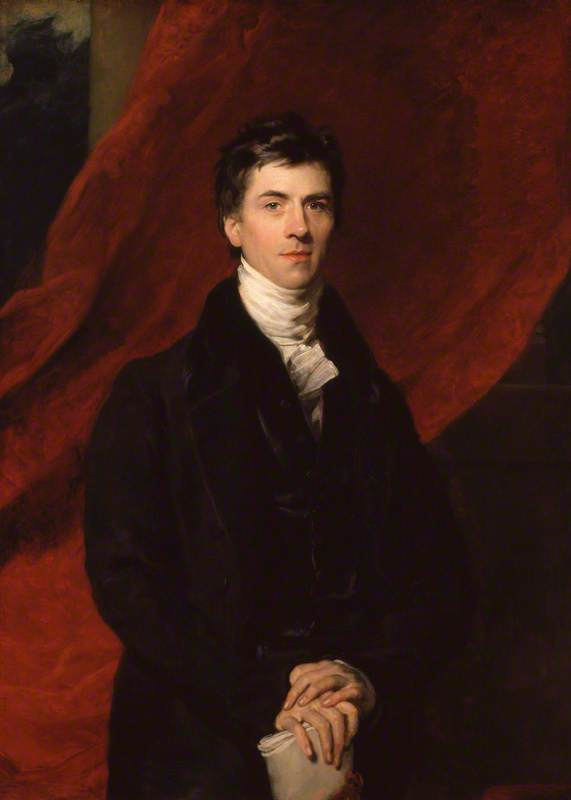
Portrait of Henry Brougham by Thomas Lawrence, 1825

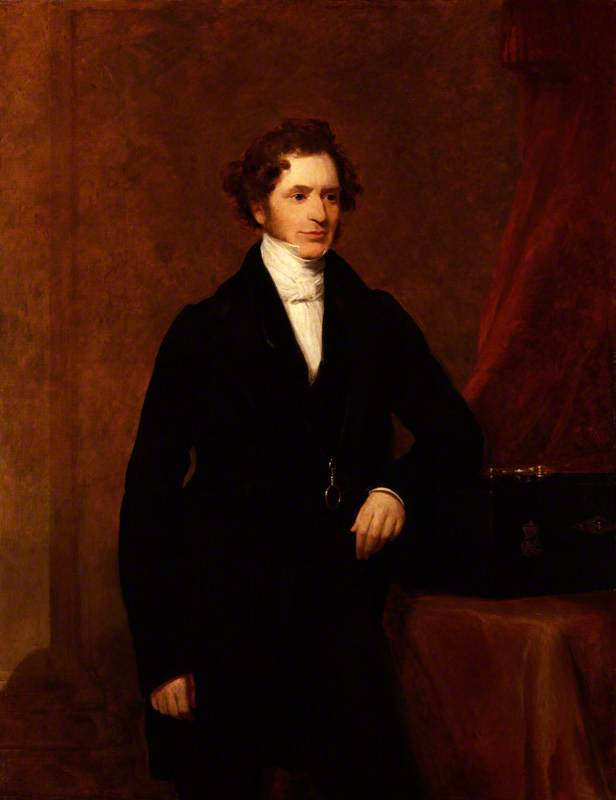
Portrait of the Earl of Derby by Frederick Richard Say, 1844

=== The Earl Grey's Cabinet, November 1830 – July 1834 ===
Office	Name	Term
First Lord of the Treasury; Leader of the House of Lords	Charles Grey, 2nd Earl Grey	November 1830 – July 1834
Lord Chancellor	Henry Peter Brougham, 1st Baron Brougham and Vaux	November 1830 – July 1834
Lord President of the Council	Henry Petty-FitzMaurice, 3rd Marquess of Lansdowne	November 1830 – July 1834
Lord Privy Seal	John Lambton, 1st Baron Durham	November 1830 – April 1833
Lord Privy Seal	Frederick Robinson, 1st Earl of Ripon	April 1833 – June 1834
Lord Privy Seal	George Howard, 6th Earl of Carlisle	June 1834 – July 1834
Home Secretary	William Lamb, 2nd Viscount Melbourne	November 1830 – July 1834
Foreign Secretary	Henry John Temple, 3rd Viscount Palmerston	November 1830 – July 1834
Secretary of State for War and the Colonies	Frederick Robinson, 1st Viscount Goderich	November 1830 – April 1833
Secretary of State for War and the Colonies	Edward Smith-Stanley	April 1833 – June 1834
Secretary of State for War and the Colonies	Thomas Spring Rice	June 1834 – July 1834
First Lord of the Admiralty	Sir James Graham, 2nd Baronet	November 1830 – June 1834
First Lord of the Admiralty	George Eden, 2nd Baron Auckland	June – July 1834
Chancellor of the Exchequer; Leader of the House of Commons	John Spencer, Viscount Althorp	November 1830 – July 1834
President of the Board of Control	Charles Grant	November 1830 – July 1834
Chief Secretary for Ireland	Edward Smith-Stanley	June 1831 – March 1833
Postmaster-General	Charles Gordon-Lennox, 5th Duke of Richmond	December 1830 – July 1834
Chancellor of the Duchy of Lancaster	Henry Richard Vassall-Fox, 3rd Baron Holland	November 1830 – July 1834
Paymaster of the Forces	Lord John Russell	June 1831 – July 1834
Secretary at War	Edward Ellice	June – July 1834
Minister without Portfolio	George Howard, 6th Earl of Carlisle	November 1830 – June 1834

=== Viscount Melbourne's Cabinet, July 1834 – November 1834 ===
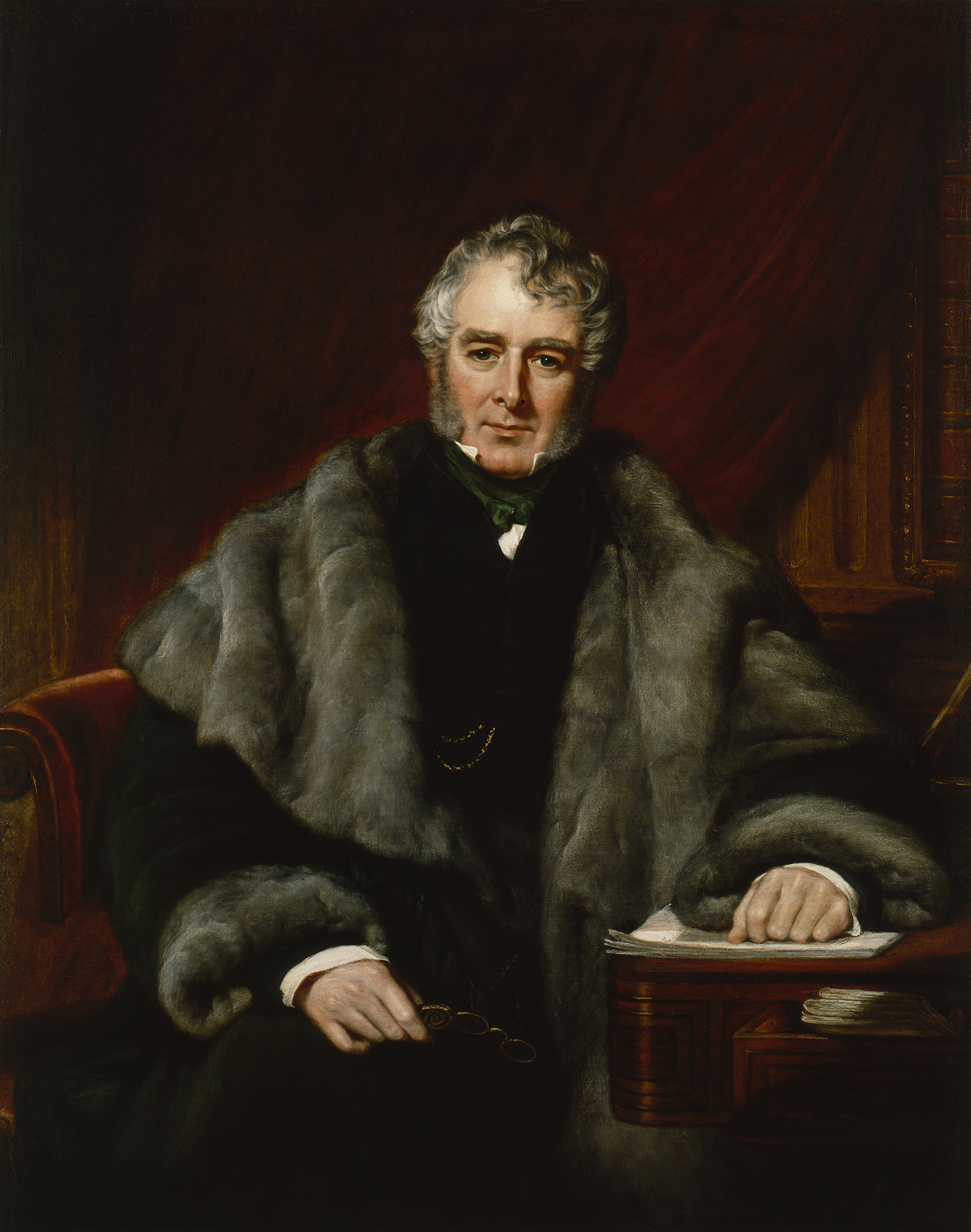
Portrait of Lord Melbourne by John Partridge, 1844

Office	Name	Term
First Lord of the Treasury; Leader of the House of Lords	William Lamb, 2nd Viscount Melbourne	July–November 1834
Lord Chancellor	Henry Peter Brougham, 1st Baron Brougham and Vaux	July–November 1834
Lord President of the Council	Henry Petty-FitzMaurice, 3rd Marquess of Lansdowne	July–November 1834
Lord Privy Seal	Constantine Phipps, 2nd Earl of Mulgrave	July–November 1834
Home Secretary	John Ponsonby, Viscount Duncannon	July–November 1834
Foreign Secretary	Henry John Temple, 3rd Viscount Palmerston	July–November 1834
Secretary of State for War and the Colonies	Thomas Spring Rice	July–November 1834
First Lord of the Admiralty	George Eden, 2nd Baron Auckland	July–November 1834
Chancellor of the Exchequer; Leader of the House of Commons	John Spencer, Viscount Althorp	July–November 1834
President of the Board of Trade; Treasurer of the Navy	Charles Poulett Thomson	July–November 1834
President of the Board of Control	Charles Grant	July–November 1834
Master of the Mint	James Abercromby	July–November 1834
First Commissioner of Woods and Forests	Sir John Hobhouse, 2nd Baronet	July–November 1834
Chancellor of the Duchy of Lancaster	Henry Richard Vassall-Fox, 3rd Baron Holland	July–November 1834
Paymaster of the Forces	Lord John Russell	July–November 1834
Secretary at War	Edward Ellice	July–November 1834

== List of ministers ==
Members of the Cabinet are indicated by bold face.

Office	Name	Date
Prime Minister First Lord of the Treasury Leader of the House of Lords	Charles Grey, 2nd Earl Grey	22 November 1830 – 9 July 1834 (Note: The government resigned 8 May 1832 and resumed 17 May 1832.)
Prime Minister First Lord of the Treasury Leader of the House of Lords	William Lamb, 2nd Viscount Melbourne	16 July 1834 – 14 November 1834
Chancellor of the Exchequer	John Spencer, Viscount Althorp (Note: Also Leader of the House of Commons until 1834.)	22 November 1830
Financial Secretary to the Treasury	Thomas Spring-Rice	26 November 1830
Financial Secretary to the Treasury	Francis Baring	6 June 1834
Parliamentary Secretary to the Treasury	Edward Ellice	26 November 1830
Parliamentary Secretary to the Treasury	Charles Wood	10 August 1832
Junior Lords of the Treasury	George Nugent-Grenville, 2nd Baron Nugent	22 November 1830 – 22 November 1832
Junior Lords of the Treasury	Robert Vernon Smith	22 November 1830 – 14 November 1834
Junior Lords of the Treasury	Francis Baring	22 November 1830 – 6 June 1834
Junior Lords of the Treasury	George Ponsonby	22 November 1830 – 14 November 1834
Junior Lords of the Treasury	Thomas Francis Kennedy	22 November 1832 – 9 April 1834
Junior Lords of the Treasury	Robert Graham	9 April 1834 – 14 November 1834
Junior Lords of the Treasury	George Byng	20 June 1834 – 14 November 1834
Lord Chancellor	Henry Brougham, 1st Baron Brougham and Vaux	22 November 1830
Lord President of the Council	Henry Petty-Fitzmaurice, 3rd Marquess of Lansdowne	22 November 1830
Lord Privy Seal	John Lambton, 1st Earl of Durham (Note: Created Earl of Durham 23 March 1833.)	22 November 1830
Lord Privy Seal	Frederick Robinson, 1st Earl of Ripon	3 April 1833
Lord Privy Seal	George Howard, 6th Earl of Carlisle	5 June 1834
Lord Privy Seal	Constantine Phipps, 2nd Earl of Mulgrave	30 July 1834
Secretary of State for the Home Department	William Lamb, 2nd Viscount Melbourne	22 November 1830
Secretary of State for the Home Department	John Ponsonby, Viscount Duncannon	19 July 1834
Under-Secretary of State for the Home Department	George Lamb	22 November 1830
Under-Secretary of State for the Home Department	Henry Grey, Viscount Howick	13 January 1834
Under-Secretary of State for the Home Department	Edward Stanley	23 July 1834
Secretary of State for Foreign Affairs	Henry John Temple, 3rd Viscount Palmerston	22 November 1830
Under-Secretary of State for Foreign Affairs	Sir George Shee, 2nd Baronet	26 November 1830
Under-Secretary of State for Foreign Affairs	George Cowper, Viscount Fordwich	13 November 1834
Secretary of State for War and the Colonies	Frederick Robinson, 1st Viscount Goderich	22 November 1830
Secretary of State for War and the Colonies	Edward Smith-Stanley	3 April 1833
Secretary of State for War and the Colonies	Thomas Spring Rice	5 June 1834
Under-Secretary of State for War and the Colonies	Henry Grey, Viscount Howick	23 November 1830
Under-Secretary of State for War and the Colonies	Sir John Shaw-Lefevre	13 January 1834
Under-Secretary of State for War and the Colonies	Sir George Grey, 2nd Baronet	16 July 1834
First Lord of the Admiralty	Sir James Graham, 2nd Baronet	22 November 1830
First Lord of the Admiralty	George Eden, 2nd Baron Auckland	7 June 1834
First Secretary to the Admiralty	George Elliot	29 November 1830
Civil Lord of the Admiralty	Henry Labouchere	8 June 1832
President of the Board of Control	Charles Grant	1 December 1830
Secretary to the Board of Control	Dudley Ryder, Viscount Sandon	18 December 1830
Secretary to the Board of Control	Thomas Hyde Villiers	18 May 1831
Secretary to the Board of Control	Thomas Babington Macaulay	19 December 1832
Secretary to the Board of Control	Robert Gordon (Note: Joint Secretary from 22 April 1834.)	26 December 1833 – 14 November 1834
Secretary to the Board of Control	James Alexander Stewart-Mackenzie	22 April 1834 – 14 November 1834
Chancellor of the Duchy of Lancaster	Henry Vassall-Fox, 3rd Baron Holland	25 November 1830
Chief Secretary for Ireland	Edward Smith-Stanley (Note: Entered the Cabinet 16 June 1831.)	29 November 1830
Chief Secretary for Ireland	Sir John Hobhouse, 2nd Baronet	29 March 1833
Chief Secretary for Ireland	Edward Littleton	18 May 1833
Lord Lieutenant of Ireland	Henry Paget, 1st Marquess of Anglesey	4 December 1830
Lord Lieutenant of Ireland	Richard Wellesley, 1st Marquess Wellesley	12 September 1833
Master of the Mint	George Eden, 2nd Baron Auckland	14 December 1830
Master of the Mint	James Abercromby	13 June 1834
Paymaster of the Forces	Lord John Russell (Note: Entered the Cabinet 16 June 1831; also Leader of the House of Commons 1834.)	16 December 1830
Minister without Portfolio	George Howard, 6th Earl of Carlisle	22 November 1830 – 5 June 1834
Postmaster-General	Charles Lennox, 5th Duke of Richmond	11 December 1830
Postmaster-General	Francis Conyngham, 2nd Marquess Conyngham	5 July 1834
President of the Board of Trade	George Eden, 2nd Baron Auckland	22 November 1830
President of the Board of Trade	Charles Poulett Thomson	5 June 1834
Vice-President of the Board of Trade	Charles Poulett Thomson	22 November 1830
Vice-President of the Board of Trade	Henry Labouchere	5 June 1834
Secretary at War	Charles Williams-Wynn	30 November 1830
Secretary at War	Sir Henry Parnell	4 April 1831
Secretary at War	Sir John Hobhouse, 2nd Baronet	1 February 1832
Secretary at War	Edward Ellice (Note: entered the Cabinet 20 June 1834.)	6 April 1833
First Commissioner of Woods and Forests	George Agar-Ellis	2 December 1830
First Commissioner of Woods and Forests	John Ponsonby, Viscount Duncannon	7 February 1831
First Commissioner of Woods and Forests	Sir John Hobhouse, 2nd Baronet	22 July 1834
Treasurer of the Navy	Charles Poulett Thomson	30 November 1830
Master-General of the Ordnance	Sir James Kempt	11 December 1830
Treasurer of the Ordnance	Thomas Creevey	31 January 1831
Surveyor-General of the Ordnance	William Leader Maberly	12 January 1831
Surveyor-General of the Ordnance	Charles Richard Fox	30 November 1832
Clerk of the Ordnance	Charles Tennyson	30 December 1830
Clerk of the Ordnance	Thomas Francis Kennedy	8 February 1832
Clerk of the Ordnance	William Leader Maberly	30 November 1832
Clerk of the Ordnance	Andrew Leith Hay	19 June 1834
Storekeeper of the Ordnance	Henry Duncan	30 December 1830
Attorney General	Sir Thomas Denman	24 November 1830
Attorney General	Sir William Horne	26 November 1832
Attorney General	Sir John Campbell	1 March 1834
Solicitor General	Sir William Horne	24 November 1830
Solicitor General	Sir John Campbell	26 November 1832
Solicitor General	Sir Charles Pepys	25 February 1834
Solicitor General	Sir Robert Rolfe	6 November 1834
Judge Advocate General	Sir Robert Grant	24 November 1830
Judge Advocate General	Robert Cutlar Fergusson	19 June 1834
Lord Advocate	Francis Jeffrey	3 December 1830
Lord Advocate	John Murray	17 May 1834
Solicitor General for Scotland	Henry Cockburn	3 December 1830
Solicitor General for Scotland	Andrew Skene	5 November 1834
Attorney General for Ireland	Edward Pennefather	23 December 1830
Attorney General for Ireland	Francis Blackburne	11 January 1831
Solicitor General for Ireland	Philip Cecil Crampton	23 December 1830
Solicitor General for Ireland	Michael O'Loghlen	21 October 1834
Lord Steward of the Household	Richard Wellesley, 1st Marquess Wellesley	23 November 1830
Lord Steward of the Household	George Campbell, 6th Duke of Argyll	11 September 1833
Lord Chamberlain of the Household	William Cavendish, 6th Duke of Devonshire	22 November 1830
Vice-Chamberlain of the Household	George Chichester, Earl of Belfast	24 July 1830
Master of the Horse	William Keppel, 4th Earl of Albemarle	24 November 1830
Treasurer of the Household	Sir William Henry Fremantle	27 May 1826 – Continued in office
Comptroller of the Household	Lord Robert Grosvenor	23 November 1830
Captain of the Gentlemen Pensioners (Note: Office renamed Captain of the Gentlemen-at-Arms 17 March 1834.)	Thomas Foley, 3rd Baron Foley	8 December 1830
Captain of the Gentlemen Pensioners	Thomas Henry Foley, 4th Baron Foley	1 May 1833
Captain of the Yeomen of the Guard	Ulick de Burgh, 1st Marquess of Clanricarde	1 December 1830
Captain of the Yeomen of the Guard	Archibald Acheson, 2nd Earl of Gosford	16 July 1834
Master of the Buckhounds	Thomas Anson, 2nd Viscount Anson (Note: Created Earl of Lichfield 15 September 1831.)	24 November 1830

Notes

Preceded by Wellington–Peel ministry	Government of the United Kingdom; 1830–1834	Succeeded by Wellington caretaker ministry
