= Liverpool ministry =

UK cabinet

- 1812–1827
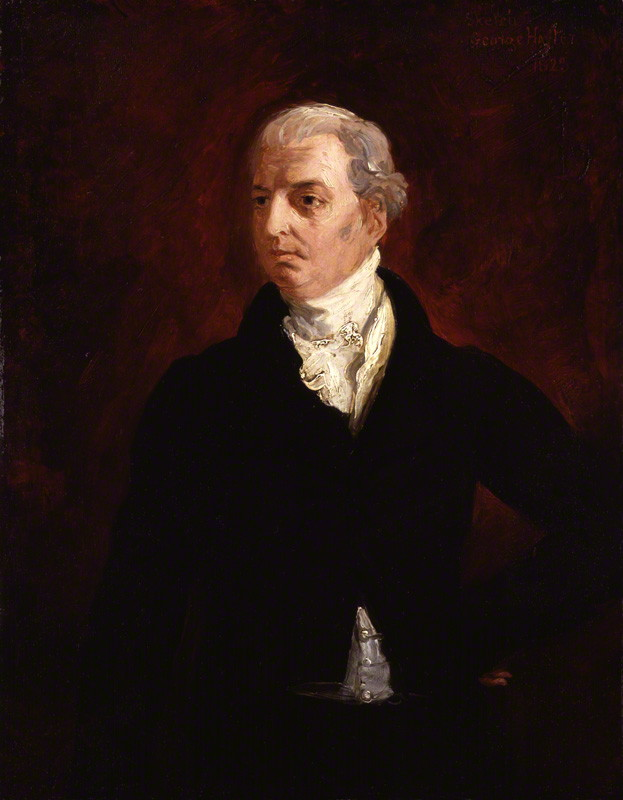
- Liverpool in 1823 by George Hayter
- Date formed: 8 June 1812
- Date dissolved: 9 April 1827

People and organisations
- Monarch: George III (1812–1820); George IV (1820–1827)
- Represented by: Prince Regent (1812–1820)
- Prime Minister: Robert Jenkinson, 2nd Earl of Liverpool
- Member party: Tory Party
- Status in legislature: Majority
- Opposition party: Whig Party
- Opposition leaders: George Ponsonby (1812–1818); George Tierney (1818–1821); Vacant (1821–1827) in the House of Commons; Lord Grenville (1812–1817); Lord Grey (1817–1827) in the House of Lords

History
- Elections: 1812 general election; 1818 general election; 1820 general election; 1826 general election
- Legislature terms: 5th UK Parliament; 6th UK Parliament; 7th UK Parliament; 8th UK Parliament
- Predecessor: Perceval ministry
- Successor: Canning ministry

Robert Jenkinson, 2nd Earl of Liverpool was invited by the Prince Regent to form a government on 8 June 1812. This is a list of members of the government of the United Kingdom in office under the leadership of Lord Liverpool from 1812 to 1827. He was appointed Prime Minister of the United Kingdom by the Prince Regent after the assassination of Spencer Perceval.

== Cabinet ==
=== 1812–1827 ===
- Robert Jenkinson, 2nd Earl of Liverpool – First Lord of the Treasury and Leader of the House of Lords
- John Scott, 1st Earl of Eldon – Lord Chancellor
- Dudley Ryder, 1st Earl of Harrowby – Lord President of the Council
- John Fane, 10th Earl of Westmorland – Lord Privy Seal
- Henry Addington, 1st Viscount Sidmouth – Secretary of State for the Home Department
- Robert Stewart, Viscount Castlereagh (Lord Londonderry after 1821) – Secretary of State for Foreign Affairs and Leader of the House of Commons
- Henry Bathurst, 3rd Earl Bathurst – Secretary of State for War and the Colonies
- Robert Dundas, 2nd Viscount Melville – First Lord of the Admiralty
- Nicholas Vansittart – Chancellor of the Exchequer
- Henry Phipps, 1st Earl of Mulgrave – Master-General of the Ordnance
- Robert Hobart, 4th Earl of Buckinghamshire – President of the Board of Control
- Charles Bathurst – Chancellor of the Duchy of Lancaster
- John Jeffreys Pratt, 1st Marquess Camden – minister without portfolio

==== Changes ====
- Late 1812 – Lord Camden leaves the Cabinet
- September 1814 – William Wellesley-Pole (Lord Maryborough from 1821), the Master of the Mint, enters the Cabinet
- February 1816 – George Canning succeeds Lord Buckinghamshire at the Board of Control
- January 1818 – Frederick John Robinson, the President of the Board of Trade, enters the Cabinet
- January 1819 – Arthur Wellesley, 1st Duke of Wellington succeeds Lord Mulgrave as Master-General of the Ordnance. Lord Mulgrave becomes minister without portfolio
- 1820 – Lord Mulgrave leaves the cabinet
- January 1821 – Charles Bathurst succeeds Canning as President of the Board of Control, remaining also at the Duchy of Lancaster
- January 1822 – Robert Peel succeeds Lord Sidmouth as Home Secretary
- February 1822 – Charles Williams-Wynn succeeds Charles Bathurst at the Board of Control. Bathurst remains at the Duchy of Lancaster and in the Cabinet
- September 1822 – Following the suicide of Lord Londonderry, George Canning becomes Foreign Secretary and Leader of the House of Commons
- January 1823 – Vansittart, elevated to the peerage as Lord Bexley, succeeds Charles Bathurst as Chancellor of the Duchy of Lancaster. F.J. Robinson succeeds Vansittart as Chancellor of the Exchequer. He is succeeded at the Board of Trade by William Huskisson
- 1823 – Lord Maryborough, the Master of the Mint, leaves the Cabinet. His successor in the office is not a Cabinet member

== Full list of ministers ==
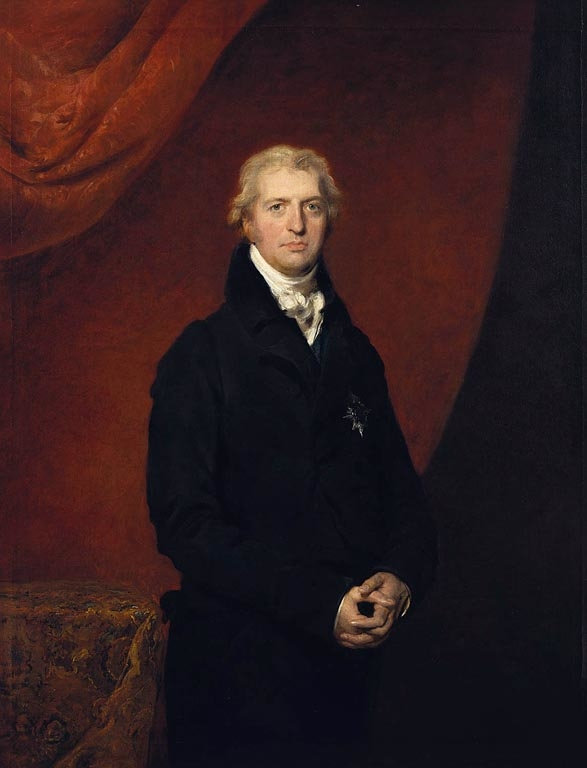
Portrait of Lord Liverpool by Thomas Lawrence, c. 1820

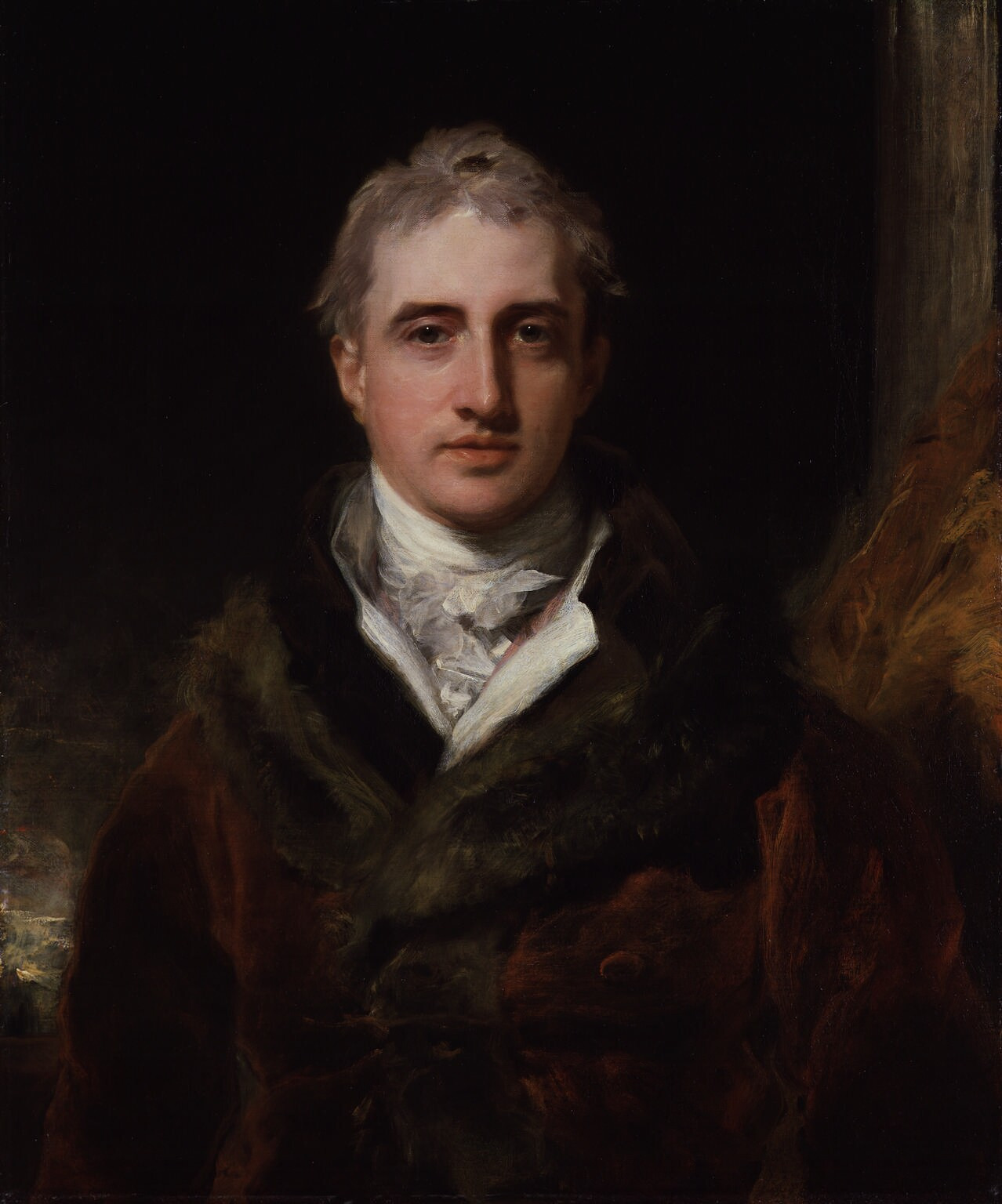
Portrait of Lord Castlereagh, 1809.

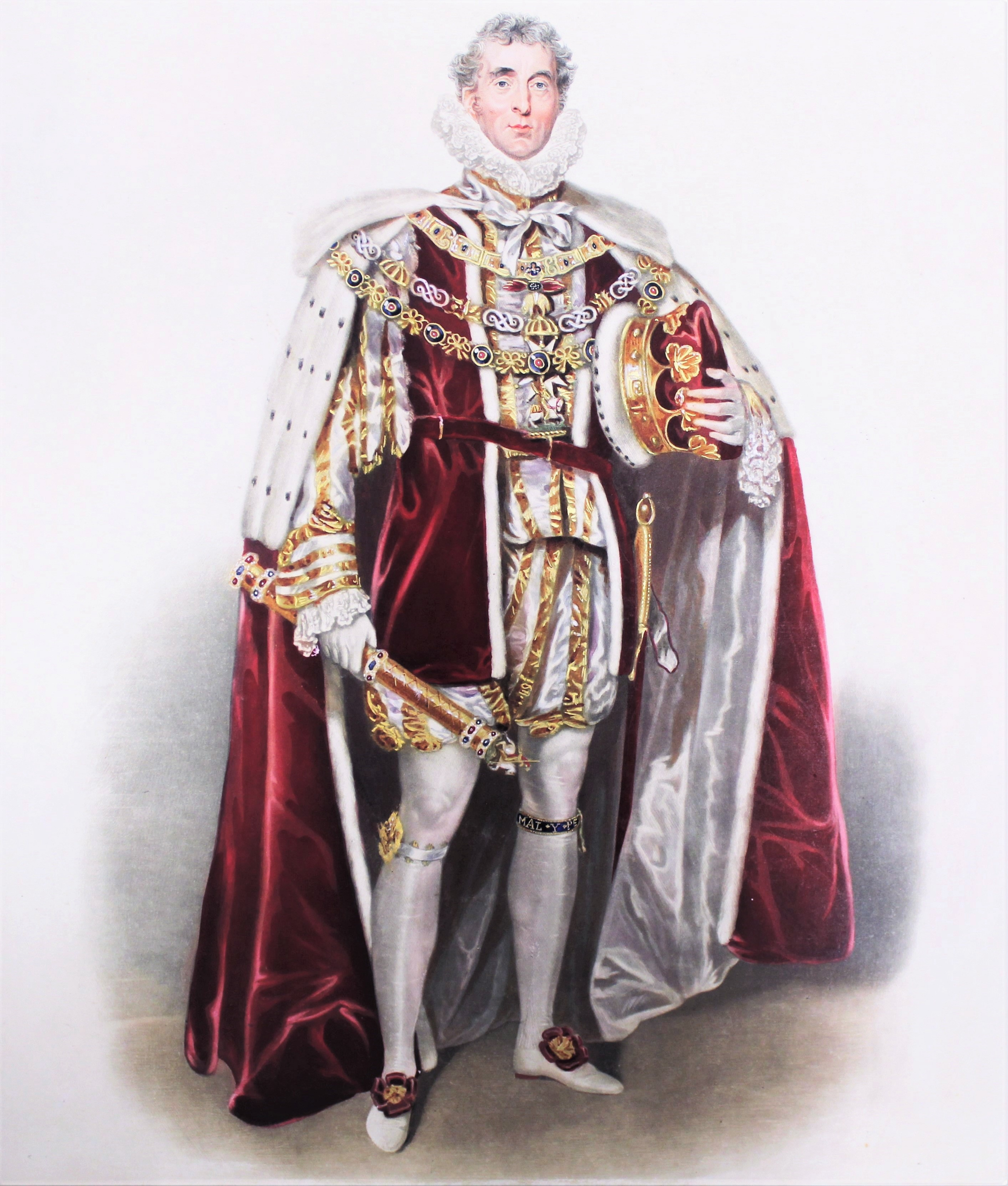
Duke of Wellington around the time he became Master-General of the Ordnance, 1820.

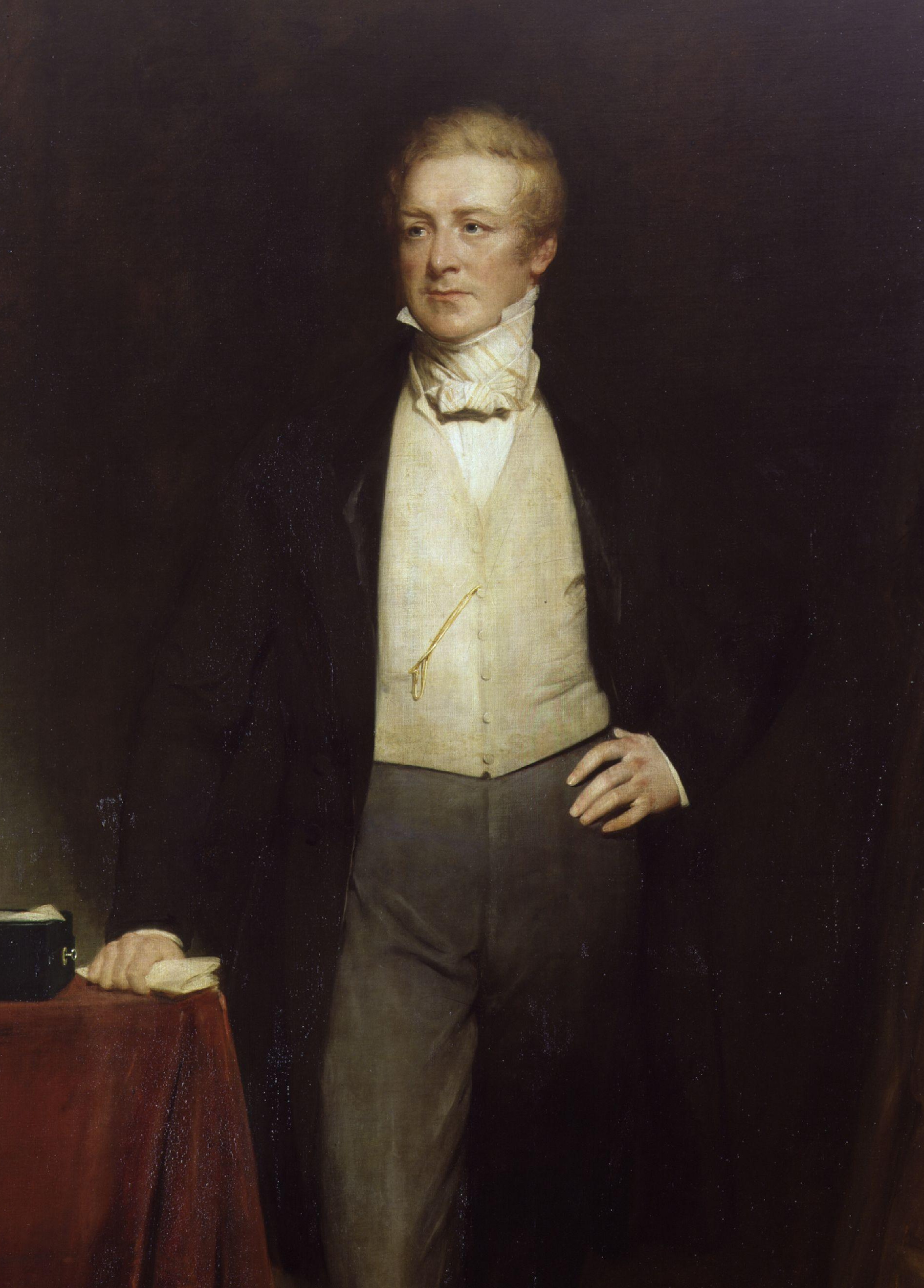
Sir Robert Peel, 2nd Bt by Henry William Pickersgill, date unknown

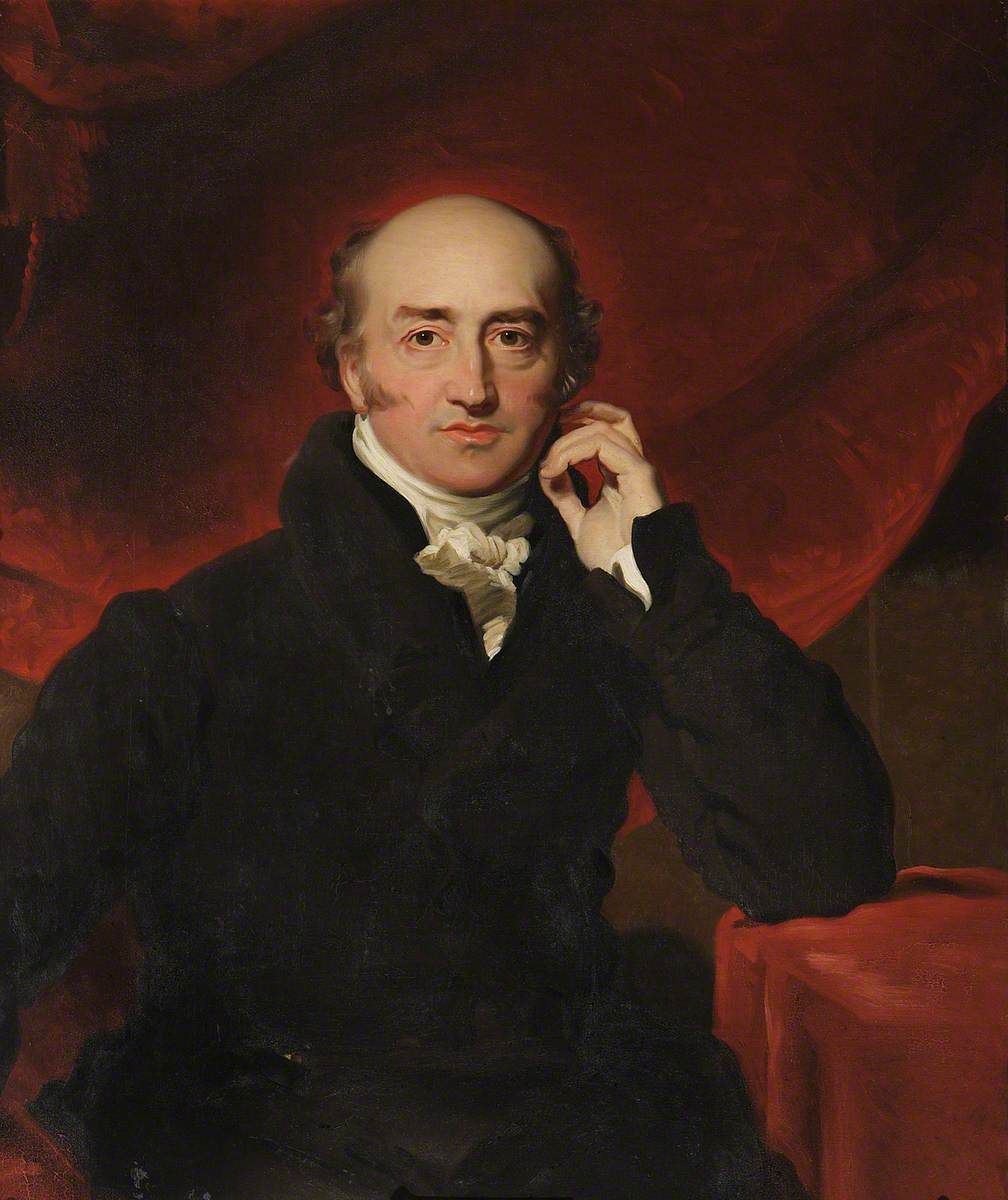
Portrait of George Canning, 1822

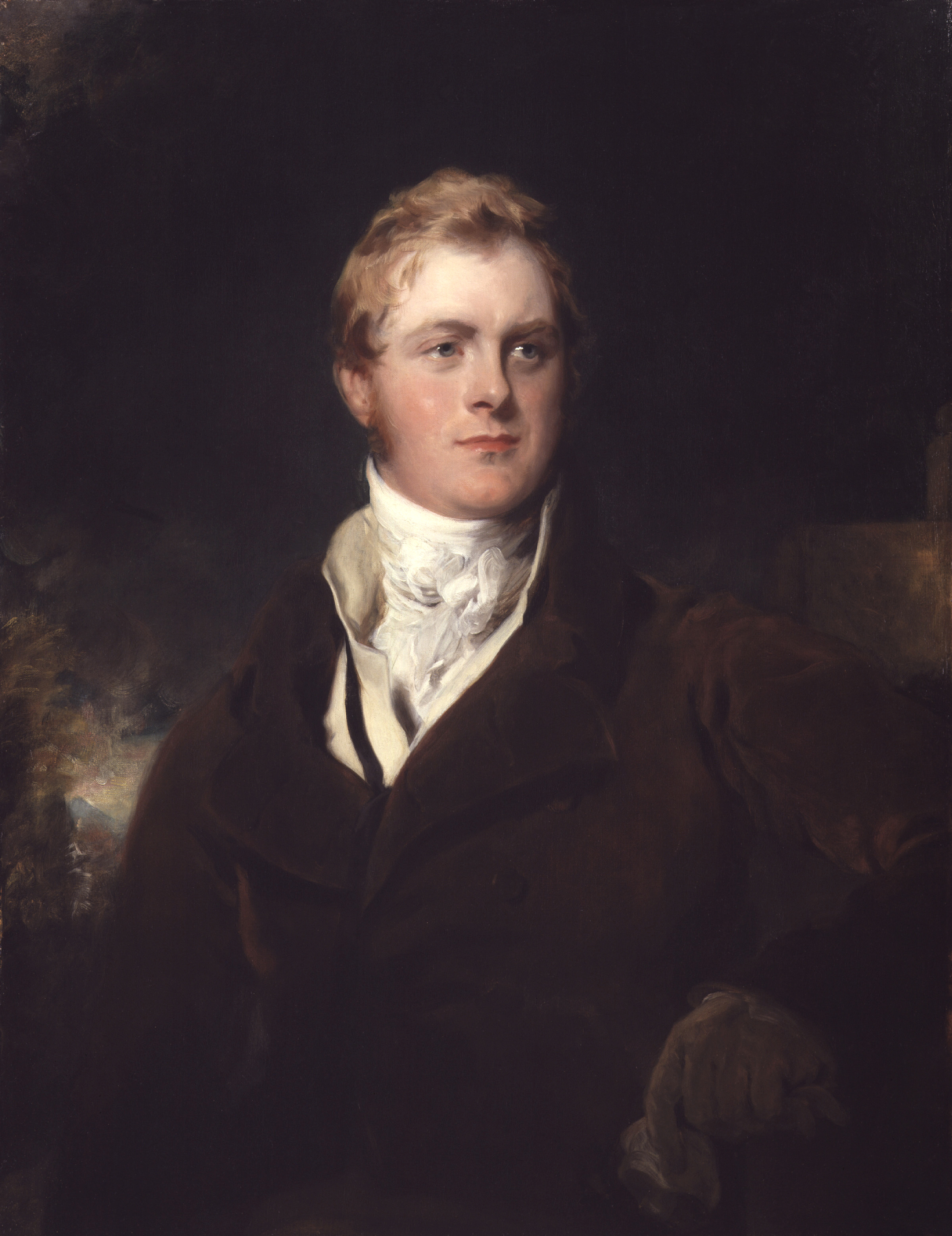
Portrait of Frederick Robinson, c. 1824

Members of the Cabinet are in bold face.

Office	Name	Date
First Lord of the Treasury Leader of the House of Lords	**Robert Jenkinson, 2nd Earl of Liverpool**	8 June 1812 – 9 April 1827
Chancellor of the Exchequer	**Nicholas Vansittart**	9 June 1812
Chancellor of the Exchequer	**Frederick Robinson**	21 January 1823
Secretaries to the Treasury	Richard Wharton	Continued in office – 1814
Secretaries to the Treasury	Charles Arbuthnot	Continued in office – 1823
Secretaries to the Treasury	Stephen Rumbold Lushington	1814–1827
Secretaries to the Treasury	John Charles Herries	1823–1827
Junior Lords of the Treasury	William Vesey-FitzGerald	16 June 1812 – 7 January 1817
Junior Lords of the Treasury	Berkeley Paget	16 June 1812 – 13 June 1826
Junior Lords of the Treasury	Frederick Robinson	16 June 1812 – 25 November 1813
Junior Lords of the Treasury	James Brogden	16 June 1812 – 20 December 1813
Junior Lords of the Treasury	William Lowther, Viscount Lowther	25 November 1813 – 30 April 1827
Junior Lords of the Treasury	Charles Grant	20 December 1813 – 25 March 1819
Junior Lords of the Treasury	John Maxwell-Barry	7 January 1817 – 3 May 1823
Junior Lords of the Treasury	William Odell	7 January 1817 – 25 March 1819
Junior Lords of the Treasury	Lord Granville Somerset	25 March 1819 – 30 April 1827
Junior Lords of the Treasury	Edmond Alexander Macnaghten	25 March 1819 – 30 April 1827
Junior Lords of the Treasury	Francis Conyngham, Earl of Mount Charles	13 June 1826 – 30 April 1827
Lord Chancellor	**John Scott, 1st Baron Eldon** (Note: Created Earl of Eldon in July 1821.)	Continued in office
Lord President of the Council	**Dudley Ryder, 1st Earl of Harrowby**	11 June 1812
Lord Privy Seal	**John Fane, 10th Earl of Westmorland**	Continued in office
Home Secretary	**Henry Addington, 1st Viscount Sidmouth**	11 June 1812
Home Secretary	**Robert Peel**	17 January 1822
Under-Secretary of State for the Home Department	Henry Goulburn	Continued in office
Under-Secretary of State for the Home Department	John Hiley Addington	August 1812
Under-Secretary of State for the Home Department	Henry Clive	April 1818
Under-Secretary of State for the Home Department	George Robert Dawson	January 1822
Secretary of State for Foreign Affairs Leader of the House of Commons	**Robert Stewart, Viscount Castlereagh** (Note: Succeeded as Marquess of Londonderry, 6 April 1821.)	Continued in office
Secretary of State for Foreign Affairs Leader of the House of Commons	**George Canning**	16 September 1822
Under-Secretary of State for Foreign Affairs	Edward Cooke	Continued in office
Under-Secretary of State for Foreign Affairs	Joseph Planta	25 July 1817
Under-Secretary of State for Foreign Affairs	Richard Meade, 3rd Earl of Clanwilliam	22 January 1822
Under-Secretary of State for Foreign Affairs	Lord Francis Conyngham (Note: Styled as Earl of Mount Charles after 1824.)	January 1823 – January 1826
Under-Secretary of State for Foreign Affairs	Charles Ellis, 6th Baron Howard de Walden	July 1824 – April 1827
Under-Secretary of State for Foreign Affairs	Ulick de Burgh, 1st Marquess of Clanricarde	January 1826 – April 1827
Secretary of State for War and the Colonies	**Henry Bathurst, 3rd Earl Bathurst**	11 June 1812
Under-Secretary of State for War and the Colonies	Henry Bunbury	Continued in office – 1816
Under-Secretary of State for War and the Colonies	Robert Peel	Continued in office – 1812
Under-Secretary of State for War and the Colonies	Henry Goulburn	1812–1821
Under-Secretary of State for War and the Colonies	Robert Wilmot Horton	1821
First Lord of the Admiralty	**Robert Dundas, 2nd Viscount Melville**	Continued in office
First Secretary to the Admiralty	John Wilson Croker	Continued in office
Civil Lords of the Admiralty	Frederick Robinson	Continued in office – 5 October 1812
Civil Lords of the Admiralty	Horatio Walpole, Baron Walpole	Continued in office – 5 October 1812
Civil Lords of the Admiralty	William Dundas	Continued in office – 23 August 1814
Civil Lords of the Admiralty	Sir George Warrender, 4th Baronet	5 October 1812 – 8 February 1822
Civil Lords of the Admiralty	John Osborn (Note: Became Sir John Osborn, Bt, in 1818.)	5 October 1812 – 16 February 1824
Civil Lords of the Admiralty	Henry Somerset, Marquess of Worcester	24 May 1816 – 15 March 1819
Civil Lords of the Admiralty	Sir George Clerk, 6th Baronet	15 March 1819 – 2 May 1827
Civil Lords of the Admiralty	Lord William Douglas	8 February – 23 March 1822; 16 February 1824 – 2 May 1827
President of the Board of Trade	**Henry Bathurst, 3rd Earl Bathurst**	Continued in office
President of the Board of Trade	Richard Le Poer Trench, 2nd Earl of Clancarty	29 September 1812
President of the Board of Trade	**Frederick Robinson**	24 January 1818
President of the Board of Trade	**William Huskisson**	31 January 1823
Vice-President of the Board of Trade	George Rose	Continued in office
Vice-President of the Board of Trade	Frederick Robinson	29 September 1812
Vice-President of the Board of Trade	Thomas Wallace	24 January 1818
Vice-President of the Board of Trade	Charles Grant	3 April 1823
President of the Board of Control	**Robert Hobart, 4th Earl of Buckinghamshire**	Continued in office
President of the Board of Control	**George Canning**	20 June 1816
President of the Board of Control	**Charles Bragge Bathurst**	16 January 1821
President of the Board of Control	**Charles Williams-Wynn**	8 February 1822
Secretary to the Board of Control	John Bruce	Continued in office
Secretary to the Board of Control	Thomas Courtenay	20 August 1812
Chancellor of the Duchy of Lancaster	**Robert Hobart, 4th Earl of Buckinghamshire**	23 June 1812
Chancellor of the Duchy of Lancaster	**Charles Bathurst**	23 August 1812
Chancellor of the Duchy of Lancaster	**Nicholas Vansittart** (Note: Created Baron Bexley 1 March 1823.)	13 February 1823
Master-General of the Ordnance	**Henry Phipps, 1st Earl of Mulgrave**	Continued in office
Master-General of the Ordnance	**Arthur Wellesley, 1st Duke of Wellington**	1 January 1819
Lieutenant-General of the Ordnance	Sir Thomas Trigge	Continued in office – 11 January 1814
Lieutenant-General of the Ordnance	Sir Hildebrand Oakes, 1st Baronet	9 March 1814 – 9 September 1822
Lieutenant-General of the Ordnance	William Beresford, 1st Viscount Beresford	18 February 1823
Lieutenant-General of the Ordnance	Sir George Murray	22 March 1824
Lieutenant-General of the Ordnance	Sir William Henry Clinton	30 April 1825
Treasurer of the Ordnance	Thomas Alcock	Continued in office
Treasurer of the Ordnance	William Holmes	20 June 1818
Surveyor-General of the Ordnance	Robert Moorsom	Continued in office
Surveyor-General of the Ordnance	Sir Ulysses Burgh (Note: Succeeded as Baron Downes, 3 March 1826.)	16 March 1820
Clerk of the Ordnance	Robert Plumer Ward	Continued in office
Clerk of the Ordnance	Sir Henry Hardinge	29 April 1823
Clerk of the Deliveries of the Ordnance	Thomas Thoroton	Continued in office
Clerk of the Deliveries of the Ordnance	Edmund Phipps	31 October 1812
Storekeeper of the Ordnance	Mark Singleton	Continued in office
Treasurer of the Navy	George Rose	Continued in office
Treasurer of the Navy	**Frederick Robinson**	12 February 1818
Treasurer of the Navy	**William Huskisson**	8 February 1823
Secretary at War	Henry John Temple, 3rd Viscount Palmerston	Continued in office
Master of the Mint	**Henry Bathurst, 3rd Earl Bathurst**	Continued in office
Master of the Mint	Richard Le Poer Trench, 2nd Earl of Clancarty	30 October 1812
Master of the Mint	**William Wellesley-Pole** (Note: Created Baron Maryborough 17 July 1821.)	28 September 1814
Master of the Mint	Thomas Wallace	9 October 1823
Paymaster of the Forces	Charles Long	Continued in office – 1826
Paymaster of the Forces	Lord Charles Henry Somerset	Continued in office – 1813
Paymaster of the Forces	Frederick Robinson	9 November 1813 – 1817
Paymaster of the Forces	William Vesey-FitzGerald	1826
Postmaster General	Thomas Pelham, 2nd Earl of Chichester	Continued in office – 1826
Postmaster General	John Montagu, 5th Earl of Sandwich	Continued in office – 1814
Postmaster General	Richard Trench, 2nd Earl of Clancarty	1814–1816
Postmaster General	James Cecil, 1st Marquess of Salisbury	1816–1823
Postmaster General	Lord Frederick Montagu	1826–1827
First Commissioner of Woods and Forests	Sylvester Douglas, 1st Baron Glenbervie	Continued in office
First Commissioner of Woods and Forests	William Huskisson	1814
First Commissioner of Woods and Forests	Charles Arbuthnot	1823
Minister without Portfolio	**John Pratt, 1st Earl Camden** (Note: Created Marquess Camden in September 1812.)	June 1812 – December 1812
Minister without Portfolio	**Henry Phipps, 1st Earl of Mulgrave**	January 1819 – May 1820
Lord Lieutenant of Ireland	Charles Lennox, 4th Duke of Richmond	Continued in office
Lord Lieutenant of Ireland	Charles Whitworth, 1st Earl Whitworth	June 1813
Lord Lieutenant of Ireland	Charles Chetwynd-Talbot, 2nd Earl Talbot	October 1817
Lord Lieutenant of Ireland	Richard Wellesley, 1st Marquess Wellesley	December 1821
Chief Secretary for Ireland	William Wellesley-Pole	Continued in office
Chief Secretary for Ireland	Robert Peel	August 1812
Chief Secretary for Ireland	Charles Grant	August 1818
Chief Secretary for Ireland	Henry Goulburn	December 1821
Attorney General	Sir Thomas Plumer	26 June 1812
Attorney General	Sir William Garrow	4 May 1813
Attorney General	Sir Samuel Shepherd	7 May 1817
Attorney General	Sir Robert Gifford	24 July 1819
Attorney General	Sir John Copley	9 January 1824
Attorney General	Sir Charles Wetherell	20 September 1826
Solicitor General	Sir William Garrow	26 June 1812
Solicitor General	Sir Robert Dallas	4 May 1813
Solicitor General	Sir Samuel Shepherd	22 December 1813
Solicitor General	Sir Robert Gifford	7 May 1817
Solicitor General	Sir John Copley	24 July 1819
Solicitor General	Sir Charles Wetherell	9 January 1824
Solicitor General	Sir Nicholas Conyngham Tindal	20 September 1826
Judge Advocate General	Charles Manners-Sutton	Continued in office
Judge Advocate General	Sir John Beckett, 2nd Baronet	25 June 1817
Lord Advocate	Archibald Colquhoun	Continued in office
Lord Advocate	Alexander Maconochie	1816
Lord Advocate	Sir William Rae, 3rd Baronet	1819
Solicitor General for Scotland	David Monypenny	Continued in office
Solicitor General for Scotland	Alexander Maconochie	1813
Solicitor General for Scotland	James Wedderburn	1816
Solicitor General for Scotland	John Hope	1822
Attorney General for Ireland	William Conyngham Plunket	1822
Solicitor General for Ireland	Charles Kendal Bushe	Continued in office
Solicitor General for Ireland	Henry Joy	20 February 1822
Lord Steward of the Household	George Cholmondeley, 4th Earl of Cholmondeley	Continued in office
Lord Steward of the Household	Henry Conyngham, 1st Marquess Conyngham	11 December 1821
Treasurer of the Household	Robert Jocelyn, Viscount Jocelyn	Continued in office
Treasurer of the Household	Lord Charles Bentinck	29 July 1812
Treasurer of the Household	William Henry Fremantle	27 May 1826
Comptroller of the Household	Lord George Thynne	Continued in office
Comptroller of the Household	Lord George Beresford	29 July 1812
Lord Chamberlain of the Household	Francis Ingram-Seymour-Conway, 2nd Marquess of Hertford	Continued in office
Lord Chamberlain of the Household	James Graham, 3rd Duke of Montrose	14 December 1821
Vice-Chamberlain of the Household	Francis Seymour-Conway, Earl of Yarmouth	Continued in office
Vice-Chamberlain of the Household	Robert Jocelyn, Viscount Jocelyn	28 July 1812
Vice-Chamberlain of the Household	James Graham, Marquess of Graham	7 February 1821
Master of the Horse	James Graham, 3rd Duke of Montrose	Continued in office
Master of the Horse	Charles Sackville-Germain, 5th Duke of Dorset	12 December 1821
Master of the Buckhounds	Charles Cornwallis, 2nd Marquess Cornwallis	Continued in office
Master of the Buckhounds	William Wellesley-Pole, 1st Baron Maryborough	22 August 1823
Captain of the Gentlemen Pensioners	James Stopford, 3rd Earl of Courtown	Continued in office
Captain of the Yeomen of the Guard	George Parker, 4th Earl of Macclesfield	Continued in office

Notes

Preceded by Perceval ministry	Government of the United Kingdom; 1812–1827	Succeeded by Canning ministry
