= Secretary of State for War and the Colonies =

British cabinet position (1801–1854)

- Royal Arms used by His Majesty's Government
- Style: The Right Honourable (Note: Typical style for members of the Privy Council and peers ranked below Marquess. For peers of the rank Marquess The Most Honourable; for peers of the rank Duke His Grace.)
- Member of: Cabinet · Privy Council · Parliament
- Appointer: Monarch of the United Kingdom based on advice of the Prime Minister
- Term length: At His Majesty's pleasure
- Formation: 17 March 1801
- First holder: The Lord Hobart
- Final holder: The Duke of Newcastle
- Abolished: 10 June 1854
- Succession: Secretary of State for War · Secretary of State for the Colonies
- Deputy: Under-Secretary of State for War and the Colonies

The Secretary of State for War and the Colonies was a British cabinet-level position responsible for the army and the British colonies (other than India). The secretary was supported by an Under-Secretary of State for War and the Colonies.

== History ==
The department was created in 1801. In 1854 it was split into the separate offices of Secretary of State for War and Secretary of State for the Colonies.

Principal political leaders of the English/British Armed Forces:
	Royal Navy	British Army	Royal Air Force	Co-ordination
1628	First Lord of the Admiralty (1628–1964)			
1794	First Lord of the Admiralty (1628–1964)	Secretary of State for War (1794–1801)		
1801	First Lord of the Admiralty (1628–1964)	Secretary of State for War and the Colonies (1801–1854)		
1854	First Lord of the Admiralty (1628–1964)	Secretary of State for War (1854–1964)		
1919	First Lord of the Admiralty (1628–1964)	Secretary of State for War (1854–1964)	Secretary of State for Air (1919–1964)	
1936	First Lord of the Admiralty (1628–1964)	Secretary of State for War (1854–1964)	Secretary of State for Air (1919–1964)	Minister for Co-ordination of Defence (1936–1940)
1940	First Lord of the Admiralty (1628–1964)	Secretary of State for War (1854–1964)	Secretary of State for Air (1919–1964)	Minister of Defence (1940–1964)
1964	Secretary of State for Defence (1964–present)			

== List of secretaries of state (1801–1854) ==
Secretary of State for War and the Colonies
Secretary	Term of office		Party	Ministry	Monarch (Reign)
Robert Hobart; Baron Hobart	17 March 1801	12 May 1804	Tory	Addington	George III (1760–1820) (Note: The Prince of Wales served as prince regent from 5 February 1811.)
John Pratt; 2nd Earl Camden	14 May 1804	10 July 1805	Tory	Pitt II	George III (1760–1820)
Robert Stewart; Viscount Castlereagh; MP for Boroughbridge	10 July 1805	5 February 1806	Tory	Pitt II	George III (1760–1820)
William Windham; MP for New Romney	5 February 1806	25 March 1807	Whig	All the Talents (Whig–Tory)	George III (1760–1820)
Robert Stewart; Viscount Castlereagh; MP for Plympton Erle	25 March 1807	1 November 1809	Tory	Portland II	George III (1760–1820)
Robert Jenkinson; 2nd Earl of Liverpool	1 November 1809	11 June 1812	Tory	Perceval	George III (1760–1820)
Henry Bathurst; 3rd Earl Bathurst	11 June 1812	30 April 1827	Tory	Liverpool	George III (1760–1820)
Henry Bathurst; 3rd Earl Bathurst	11 June 1812	30 April 1827	Tory	Liverpool	George IV
F. J. Robinson; 1st Viscount Goderich	30 April 1827	3 September 1827	Tory	Canning (Canningite–Whig)	George IV
William Huskisson; MP for Liverpool	3 September 1827	30 May 1828	Tory	Goderich (Canningite–Whig)	George IV
Sir George Murray; MP for Perthshire	30 May 1828	22 November 1830	Tory	Wellington–Peel	George IV
Sir George Murray; MP for Perthshire	30 May 1828	22 November 1830	Tory	Wellington–Peel	William IV
F. J. Robinson; 1st Viscount Goderich	22 November 1830	3 April 1833	Whig	Grey	William IV
Edward Smith-Stanley; MP for North Lancashire	3 April 1833	5 June 1834	Whig	Grey	William IV
Thomas Spring Rice; MP for Cambridge	5 June 1834	14 November 1834	Whig	Melbourne I	William IV
Arthur Wellesley; 1st Duke of Wellington	17 November 1834	9 December 1834	Tory	Wellington Caretaker	William IV
George Hamilton-Gordon; 4th Earl of Aberdeen	20 December 1834	8 April 1835	Conservative	Peel I	William IV
Charles Grant; 1st Baron Glenelg	18 April 1835	20 February 1839	Whig	Melbourne II	William IV
Charles Grant; 1st Baron Glenelg	18 April 1835	20 February 1839	Whig	Melbourne II	Victoria
Constantine Phipps; 1st Marquess of Normanby	20 February 1839	30 August 1839	Whig	Melbourne II	Victoria
Lord John Russell; MP for Stroud	30 August 1839	30 August 1841	Whig	Melbourne II	Victoria
Edward Smith-Stanley; Baron Stanley of Bickerstaffe (Note: MP for North Lancashire until 1844; thereafter summoned to Parliament through a writ in acceleration in respect of his father's title, Baron Stanley of Bickerstaffe.)	3 September 1841	23 December 1845	Conservative	Peel II	Victoria
William Ewart Gladstone (Note: On appointment to office a ministerial by-election was triggered in the Newark-upon-Trent constituency that Gladstone had represented since 1832. Gladstone did not contest the seat, and was not returned to Parliament until the 1847 general election.)	23 December 1845	27 June 1846	Conservative	Peel II	Victoria
Henry Grey; 3rd Earl Grey	6 July 1846	21 February 1852	Whig	Russell I	Victoria
Sir John Pakington, 1st Baronet; MP for Droitwich	27 February 1852	17 December 1852	Conservative	Who? Who?	Victoria
Henry Pelham-Clinton; 5th Duke of Newcastle	28 December 1852	10 June 1854	Peelite	Aberdeen (Peelite–Whig)	Victoria

== UK History of the Foreign and Commonwealth Office ==
History of English and British government departments with responsibility for foreign affairs and those with responsibility for the colonies, dominions and the Commonwealth
Northern Department; 1660–1782; Secretaries — Undersecretaries	Southern Department; 1660–1768; Secretaries — Undersecretaries		—
Northern Department; 1660–1782; Secretaries — Undersecretaries	Southern Department; 1768–1782; Secretaries — Undersecretaries; 1782: diplomatic responsibilities transferred to new Foreign Office	Colonial Office; 1768–1782; Secretaries — Undersecretaries	—
Foreign Office; 1782–1968; Secretaries — Ministers — Undersecretaries	Home Office; 1782–1794; Secretaries — Undersecretaries		—
Foreign Office; 1782–1968; Secretaries — Ministers — Undersecretaries	War Office; 1794–1801; Secretaries — Undersecretaries		—
Foreign Office; 1782–1968; Secretaries — Ministers — Undersecretaries	War and Colonial Office; 1801–1854; Secretaries — Undersecretaries		—
Foreign Office; 1782–1968; Secretaries — Ministers — Undersecretaries	Colonial Office; 1854–1925; Secretaries — Undersecretaries		India Office; 1858–1937; Secretaries — Undersecretaries
Foreign Office; 1782–1968; Secretaries — Ministers — Undersecretaries	Colonial Office; 1925–1966; Secretaries — Ministers — Undersecretaries	Dominions Office; 1925–1947; Secretaries — Undersecretaries	India Office; 1858–1937; Secretaries — Undersecretaries
Foreign Office; 1782–1968; Secretaries — Ministers — Undersecretaries	Colonial Office; 1925–1966; Secretaries — Ministers — Undersecretaries	Dominions Office; 1925–1947; Secretaries — Undersecretaries	India Office and Burma Office; 1937–1947; Secretaries — Undersecretaries
Foreign Office; 1782–1968; Secretaries — Ministers — Undersecretaries	Colonial Office; 1925–1966; Secretaries — Ministers — Undersecretaries	Commonwealth Relations Office; 1947–1966; Secretaries — Ministers — Undersecretaries	
Foreign Office; 1782–1968; Secretaries — Ministers — Undersecretaries	Commonwealth Office; 1966–1968; Secretaries — Ministers — Undersecretaries		
Foreign and Commonwealth Office; 1968–2020; Secretaries — Ministers — Undersecretaries
Foreign, Commonwealth and Development Office; Since 2020; Secretaries — Ministers — Undersecretaries
