= President of the Board of Control =

Former British government post

- Royal Arms as used by His Majesty's Government
- India Board
- Member of: British Cabinet; Privy Council
- Seat: Westminster, London
- Appointer: The British Monarch (on advice of the Prime Minister)
- Term length: No fixed term
- Constituting instrument: East India Company Act 1784
- Formation: 4 September 1784
- First holder: Thomas Townshend, 1st Viscount Sydney
- Final holder: Edward Stanley, Lord Stanley
- Abolished: 2 August 1858

The President of the Board of Control was a British government official in the late 18th and early 19th centuries responsible for overseeing the British East India Company and generally serving as the chief official in London responsible for Indian affairs. The position was frequently a cabinet level one. The position was abolished in 1858 with the abolition of the East India Company. It was succeeded by the new position of Secretary of State for India.

== List of presidents of the Board of Control ==
President of the Board of Control
Whig Tory Conservative
Portrait	Name Honorifics and constituency	Term of office		Party	Ministry
	Thomas Townshend, 1st Baron Sydney before 1789; Viscount Sydney after 1789	4 September 1784	6 March 1790	Whig	Pitt I
	William Grenville, 1st Baron Grenville	6 March 1790	22 June 1793	Tory (Pittite)	Pitt I
	Henry Dundas; MP for Edinburgh	22 June 1793	25 April 1801	Tory	Pitt I
	George Legge, 3rd Earl of Dartmouth	25 April 1801	2 July 1802	Tory	Addington
‍	Robert Stewart, Viscount Castlereagh; MP for Down before 1805; MP for Boroughbridge after 1806	2 July 1802	11 February 1806	Tory	Addington
	Robert Stewart, Viscount Castlereagh; MP for Down before 1805; MP for Boroughbridge after 1806	2 July 1802	11 February 1806	Tory	Pitt II
	Gilbert Elliot-Murray-Kynynmound, 1st Baron Minto	11 February 1806	15 July 1806	Whig	All the Talents (Whig–Tory)
	Thomas Grenville; MP for Buckingham	15 July 1806	30 September 1806	Whig	All the Talents (Whig–Tory)
	George Tierney; MP for Athlone	30 September 1806	6 April 1807	Whig	All the Talents (Whig–Tory)
	Robert Dundas, 2nd Viscount Melville; MP for Midlothian	6 April 1807	11 July 1809	Tory	Portland II
	Dudley Ryder, 1st Earl of Harrowby	11 July 1809	November; 1809	Tory	Portland II
	Dudley Ryder, 1st Earl of Harrowby	11 July 1809	November; 1809	Tory	Perceval
	Robert Dundas, 2nd Viscount Melville; MP for Midlothian before 1811; Viscount Melville after 1811	November; 1809	4 April 1812	Tory	Perceval
	Robert Hobart, 4th Earl of Buckinghamshire	4 April 1812	4 June 1816	Tory	Perceval
	Robert Hobart, 4th Earl of Buckinghamshire	4 April 1812	4 June 1816	Tory	Liverpool
	George Canning; MP for Liverpool	4 June 1816	June; 1821	Tory	Liverpool
	Charles Bathurst; MP for Harwich	June; 1821	4 February 1822		Liverpool
	Charles Williams-Wynn (1775–1850); MP for Montgomeryshire	4 February 1822	4 February 1828	Tory	Liverpool
	Charles Williams-Wynn (1775–1850); MP for Montgomeryshire	4 February 1822	4 February 1828	Tory	Canning (Canningite–Whig)
	Charles Williams-Wynn (1775–1850); MP for Montgomeryshire	4 February 1822	4 February 1828	Tory	Goderich (Canningite–Whig)
	Charles Williams-Wynn (1775–1850); MP for Montgomeryshire	4 February 1822	4 February 1828	Tory	Wellington–Peel
	Robert Dundas, 2nd Viscount Melville	4 February 1828	17 September 1828	Tory	Wellington–Peel
	Edward Law, 2nd Baron Ellenborough	17 September 1828	1 December 1830	Tory	Wellington–Peel
	Charles Grant; MP for Inverness-shire	1 December 1830	18 September 1834	Whig	Grey
	Charles Grant; MP for Inverness-shire	1 December 1830	18 September 1834	Whig	Melbourne I
	Edward Law, 2nd Baron Ellenborough	18 September 1834	23 April 1835	Conservative	Peel I
	Sir John Hobhouse, 2nd Baronet; MP for Nottingham	23 April 1835	30 August 1841	Whig	Melbourne II
	Edward Law, 2nd Baron Ellenborough	4 September 1841	23 October 1841	Conservative	Peel II
	William Vesey-FitzGerald, 2nd Baron FitzGerald and Vesey	23 October 1841	17 May 1843	Conservative	Peel II
	F. J. Robinson, 1st Earl of Ripon	17 May 1843	30 June 1846	Conservative	Peel II
	John Hobhouse, 1st Baron Broughton; MP for Nottingham before 1847; MP for Harwich after 1848	8 July 1846	5 February 1852	Whig	Russell
	Fox Maule; MP for Perth	5 February 1852	21 February 1852	Whig	Russell
	John Charles Herries; MP for Stamford	28 February 1852	17 December 1852	Conservative	Who? Who?
	Sir Charles Wood, 3rd Baronet; MP for Halifax	30 December 1852	3 March 1855	Whig	Aberdeen (Peelite–Whig)
	Robert Vernon Smith; MP for Northampton	3 March 1855	21 February 1858	Whig	Palmerston I
	Edward Law, 1st Earl of Ellenborough	6 March 1858	5 June 1858	Conservative	Derby–Disraeli II
	Edward Stanley, Lord Stanley; MP for King's Lynn	5 June 1858	2 August 1858	Conservative	Derby–Disraeli II

Lord Stanley took up the new post of Secretary of State for India on 2 August 1858, upon the establishment of the British Raj.
