= Canningite =

Faction of the British Whigs

- Leader: George Canning (before 1827); William Huskisson (1827–30)
- Founded: 1820s
- Dissolved: November 1830; 195 years ago
- Merged into: Whigs
- Ideology: Whiggism; Conservatism; Catholic emancipation Free trade
- Political position: Centre to Centre-right
- National affiliation: Tories

Canningites were a faction of Conservative British Whigs in the first decade of the 19th century through the 1820s who were led by George Canning. The Canningites were distinct within the Tory party because they favoured Catholic emancipation and free trade.

After the incapacity of Lord Liverpool in 1827, Canning was asked to form a government. Because Canning did not have the full support of the Tory party, which was split between Canningites and Ultra-Tories, he created a coalition government with his Canningites allying themselves with the Whigs. Canning died in August 1827 and the Canningite Lord Goderich became Prime Minister, but his government collapsed in January 1828. The Canningites then allied themselves with the Tories, led by the Duke of Wellington. They resigned in May 1828, though, on the issue of allocating seats from disenfranchised corrupt boroughs to the new growing cities of England.

Now usually known as the 'Huskissonites' (after their new leader, William Huskisson) the group numbered a bare dozen or so in the House of Commons, with greater support in the House of Lords. For the next year and half they acted as a separate group between the two main parties, and were courted by both. After Huskisson died in 1830 (in a railway accident, the first recorded casualty of this new form of transport), the remainder of the group decided to join the Whigs and voted against the Tory government in a parliament in favour of electoral reform. Wellington resigned as prime minister and the surviving Canningite/Huskissonites joined the new Whig cabinet of Earl Grey in November 1830. Very soon after, they ceased to act as a recognisable separate political grouping.

In addition to Goderich and Huskisson, prominent Canningites included:

- Granville Leveson-Gower
- Edward John Littleton
- Viscount Palmerston
- William Sturges Bourne
- Robert John Wilmot-Horton
- Charles Grant

== See also ==
- Peelites, another eponymous group of early 19th-century centrist Tories that supported free trade
