= Charles Grant, 1st Baron Glenelg =

Scottish colonial administrator (1778–1866)

The Right Honourable The Lord Glenelg PC FRS
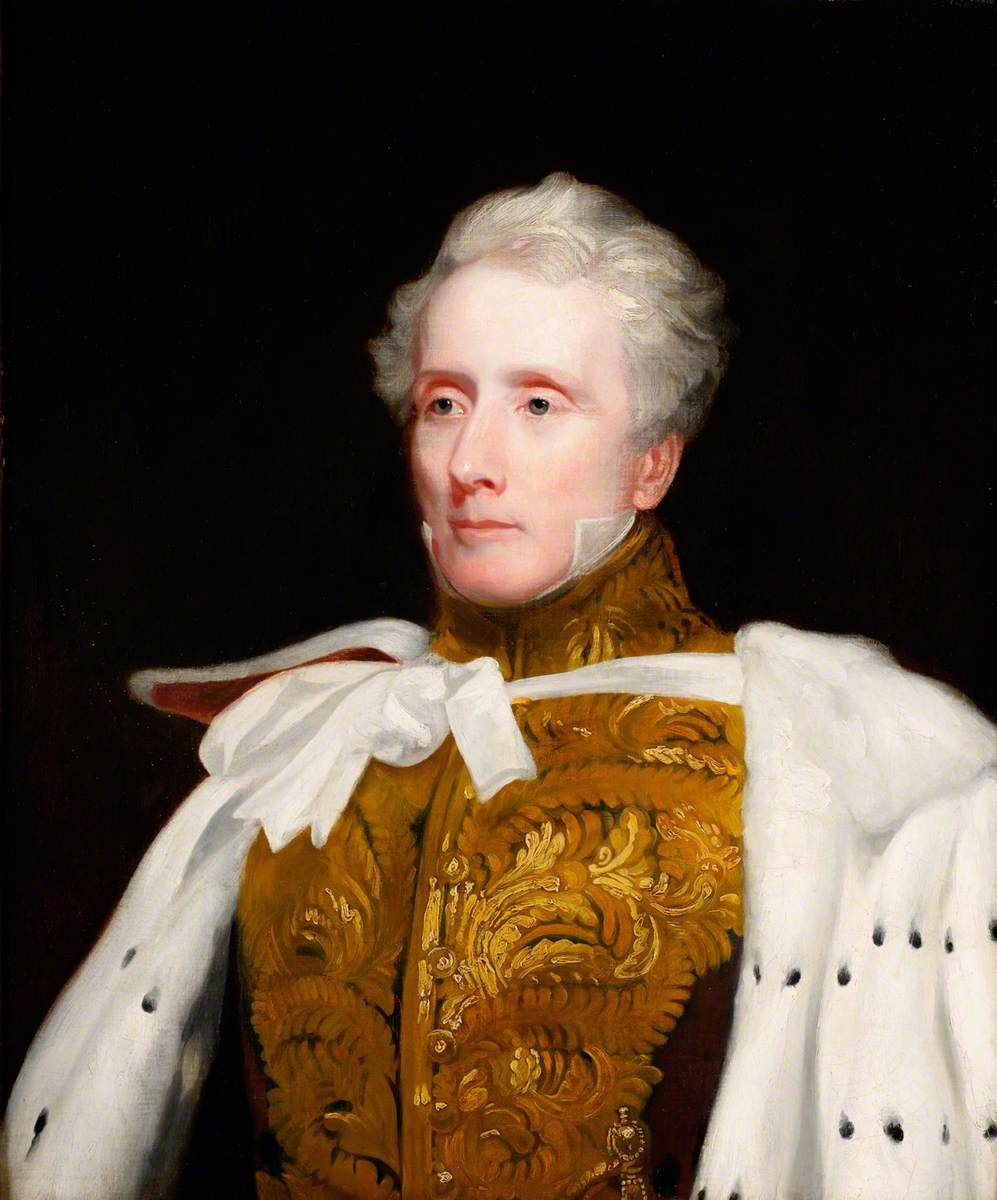
- 1837 portrait by Henry Perronet Briggs

President of the Board of Trade
- In office 4 September 1827 – 11 June 1828
- Monarch: George IV
- Prime Minister: The Viscount Goderich; The Duke of Wellington
- Preceded by: William Huskisson
- Succeeded by: William Vesey-FitzGerald

Secretary of State for War and the Colonies
- In office 18 April 1835 – 20 February 1839
- Monarchs: William IV; Victoria
- Prime Minister: The Viscount Melbourne
- Preceded by: The Earl of Aberdeen
- Succeeded by: The Marquess of Normanby

Personal details
- Born: 26 October 1778 Kidderpore, Calcutta, Company rule in India
- Died: 23 April 1866 (aged 87) Cannes, Second French Empire
- Party: Tory; Whig
- Education: Magdalene College, Cambridge

Charles Grant, 1st Baron Glenelg, PC, FRS (26 October 1778 – 23 April 1866) was a Scottish politician and colonial administrator who served as Secretary of State for War and the Colonies.

== Background and education ==
Grant was born in Kidderpore, Bengal Presidency, British India, the eldest son of Charles Grant, chairman of the directors of the British East India Company. His brother, Sir Robert Grant, was also an MP as well as Governor of Bombay. He was educated at Magdalene College, Cambridge, and became a fellow in 1802. He was called to the bar in 1807.

== Political career ==
Mr. Grant's Indemnity Act 1814
- Act of Parliament
- Parliament of the United Kingdom
- Long title: An Act for indemnify Charles Grant Junior, Esquire, from certain Penalties which he has incurred by sitting and voting in the House of Commons without having taken the Oaths required by Law to be taken before the Lord Steward, or his Deputy or Deputies.
- Citation: 54 Geo. 3. c. 3 Pr.

Dates
- Royal assent: 29 March 1814

In 1811 Grant was elected to the British House of Commons as Member of Parliament for Inverness Burghs. He held that seat until 1818, when he was returned for Inverness-shire. He was a Lord of the Treasury from December 1813, and when retaking his seat after the requisite ministerial by-election he neglected to retake the parliamentary oaths in the prescribed manner; a private act of Parliament, Mr. Grant's Indemnity Act 1814 (54 Geo. 3. c. 3 Pr.) indemnified him against the penalties due for the breach. In August 1819 he became Chief Secretary for Ireland and a Privy Counsellor. In 1823 he was appointed Vice-President of the Board of Trade; from September 1827 to June 1828 he was President of the Board of Trade and Treasurer of the Navy.

Grant broke with the Tories over Reform and joined the Whigs (via the Canningite Tory splinter group). He was President of the Board of Control under Lord Grey and Lord Melbourne from November 1830 to November 1834. At the Board of Control Grant was primarily responsible for the Government of India Act 1833 that altered the constitution of the Government of India. In April 1835 he became Secretary of State for War and the Colonies, and was created Baron Glenelg, of Glenelg in the County of Inverness. His term of office was a stormy one. His differences with Sir Benjamin d'Urban, Governor of Cape Colony, were serious; but more so were those with King William IV and others over the administration of Canada. Lord Glenelg was still Secretary when the Canadian rebellion broke out in 1837; his policy was fiercely attacked in Parliament; he became involved in disputes with Lord Durham, and the movement for his supersession found supporters even among his colleagues in the cabinet. In February 1839 Lord Glenelg resigned. He has been called the last of the Canningites.

== Personal life ==
Lord Glenelg died in Cannes, France in April 1866, aged 87. The barony became extinct on his death.

== Legacy ==
A ship, the Lord Glenelg was named after him which voyaged from Britain to Australia in 1841.

== Notes ==
Parliament of the United Kingdom
Preceded by Peter Baillie	Member of Parliament for Inverness Burghs; 1811–1818	Succeeded by George Cumming
Preceded by Charles Grant	Member of Parliament for Inverness-shire; 1818–1835	Succeeded by Alexander William Chisholm
Political offices
Preceded by Robert Peel	Chief Secretary for Ireland; 1818–1821	Succeeded by Henry Goulburn
Preceded by Thomas Wallace	Vice-President of the Board of Trade; 1823–1828	Succeeded by Thomas Frankland Lewis
Preceded by William Huskisson	President of the Board of Trade; 1827–1828	Succeeded by William Vesey-FitzGerald
Preceded by William Huskisson	Treasurer of the Navy; 1827–1828	Succeeded by William Vesey-FitzGerald
Preceded by The Lord Ellenborough	President of the Board of Control; 1830–1834	Succeeded by The Lord Ellenborough
Preceded by The Earl of Aberdeen	Secretary of State for War and the Colonies; 1835–1839	Succeeded by The Marquess of Normanby
Peerage of the United Kingdom
New creation	Baron Glenelg; 1835–1866	Extinct
