= Deputy President of the Board of Trade =

Ministerial Position in the United Kingdom

United Kingdom Vice-President of the Board of Trade
- Royal Arms as used by Her Majesty's Government
- Board of Trade; UK Export Finance
- Style: The Right Honourable (Formal prefix); Vice-President of the Board of Trade
- Member of: Privy Council
- Reports to: The President of the Board of Trade
- Appointer: The British Monarch (on advice of the Prime Minister)
- Term length: No fixed term

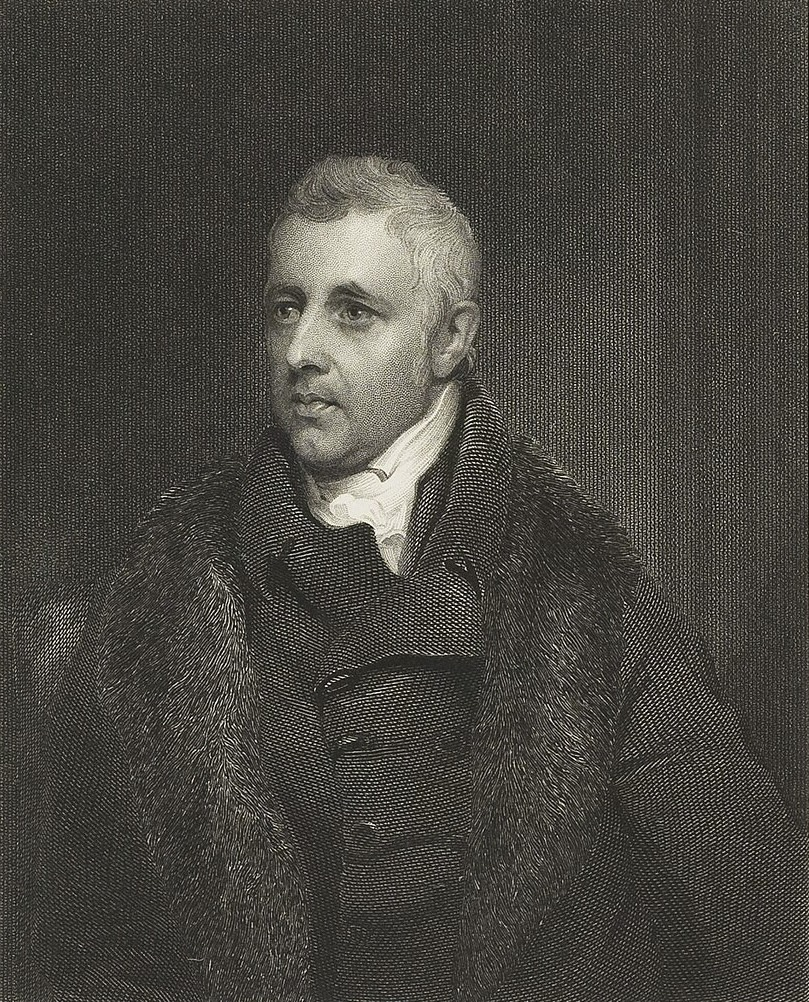
The Hon. Dudley Ryder, later 1st Earl of Harrowby, who served as vice-president of the Board of Trade from 1790 to 1801.

The office of Vice-president of the Board of Trade was a junior ministerial position in the government of the United Kingdom at the Board of Trade, within the Department for Business and Trade. The office of Vice-president was created in 1786 but fell into abeyance in 1867. From 1848 onwards, the office was held concurrently with that of Paymaster General. The office of vice-president itself was effectively succeeded by that of Parliamentary Secretary to the Board of Trade but the role is extant.

Notable holders of the office of vice-president include Lord Grenville, William Gladstone, Lord Goderich and the Earl Granville.

In 2020, there was an unusual appointment of a Deputy President of the Board of Trade to assist the President, but the holder remained only an adviser to the Board. This appears to have been a one-off appointment, and this role no longer exists.

== Vice-Presidents of the Board of Trade, 1786–1867 (currently in abeyance) ==
Name	Entered office	Left office
William Grenville	23 August 1786	8 August 1789
James Graham, Marquess of Graham (Duke of Montrose from 23 September 1790)	8 August 1789	20 October 1790
Dudley Ryder	20 October 1790	18 November 1801
Sylvester Douglas, 1st Baron Glenbervie	18 November 1801	8 February 1804
Nathaniel Bond	8 February 1804	6 June 1804
George Rose	6 June 1804	5 February 1806
Richard Temple-Grenville, Earl Temple	5 February 1806	30 March 1807
George Rose	30 March 1807	29 September 1812
Frederick John Robinson	29 September 1812	24 January 1818
Thomas Wallace	24 January 1818	3 April 1823
Charles Grant	3 April 1823	5 February 1828
Thomas Frankland Lewis	5 February 1828	30 May 1828
Thomas Courtenay	30 May 1828	22 November 1830
Charles Poulett Thomson	22 November 1830	20 December 1834
William Lowther, Viscount Lowther	20 December 1834	6 May 1835
Henry Labouchere	6 May 1835	29 August 1839
Richard Lalor Sheil	29 August 1839	28 June 1841
Fox Maule	28 June 1841	3 September 1841
William Gladstone	3 September 1841	10 June 1843
James Broun-Ramsay, 10th Earl of Dalhousie	10 June 1843	5 February 1845
Sir George Clerk, 6th Baronet	5 February 1845	8 July 1846
Thomas Milner Gibson	8 July 1846	8 May 1848
Granville Leveson-Gower, 2nd Earl Granville	8 May 1848	11 February 1852
Edward Stanley, 2nd Baron Stanley of Alderley	11 February 1852	27 February 1852
Charles Abbot, 2nd Baron Colchester	27 February 1852	4 January 1853
Edward Stanley, 2nd Baron Stanley of Alderley	4 January 1853	31 March 1855
Edward Pleydell-Bouverie	31 March 1855	13 August 1855
Robert Lowe	13 August 1855	6 April 1858
Richard Hely-Hutchinson, 4th Earl of Donoughmore	6 April 1858	3 March 1859
Algernon Percy, Baron Lovaine	3 March 1859	18 June 1859
James Wilson	18 June 1859	12 August 1859
William Francis Cowper	12 August 1859	22 February 1860
William Hutt	22 February 1860	29 November 1865
George Goschen	29 November 1865	12 March 1866
William Monsell	12 March 1866	10 July 1866
Stephen Cave	10 July 1866	12 August 1867
Vacant		

== Deputy President of the Board of Trade, 2020 ==
At some point on or before 8 June 2020, when it was mentioned in answer to a written parliamentary question, the Board of Trade had begun to be served by a Deputy President, in the person of the backbencher Marcus Fysh MP. This was later mentioned in a press release about updated membership.

Name	Entered office	Left office
Marcus Fysh	On or before 8 June 2020	October 2020
