= Stanhope–Sunderland ministry =

Stanhope–Sunderland ministry may refer to two ministries of the Kingdom of Great Britain:

- First Stanhope–Sunderland ministry, the British government under Lord Stanhope and Lord Sunderland (1717–1718)
- Second Stanhope–Sunderland ministry, the British government under Lord Stanhope and Lord Sunderland (1718–1721)
