= Lord President of the Council =

United Kingdom official position

United Kingdom Lord President of the Council
- Arms used by the Privy Council Office

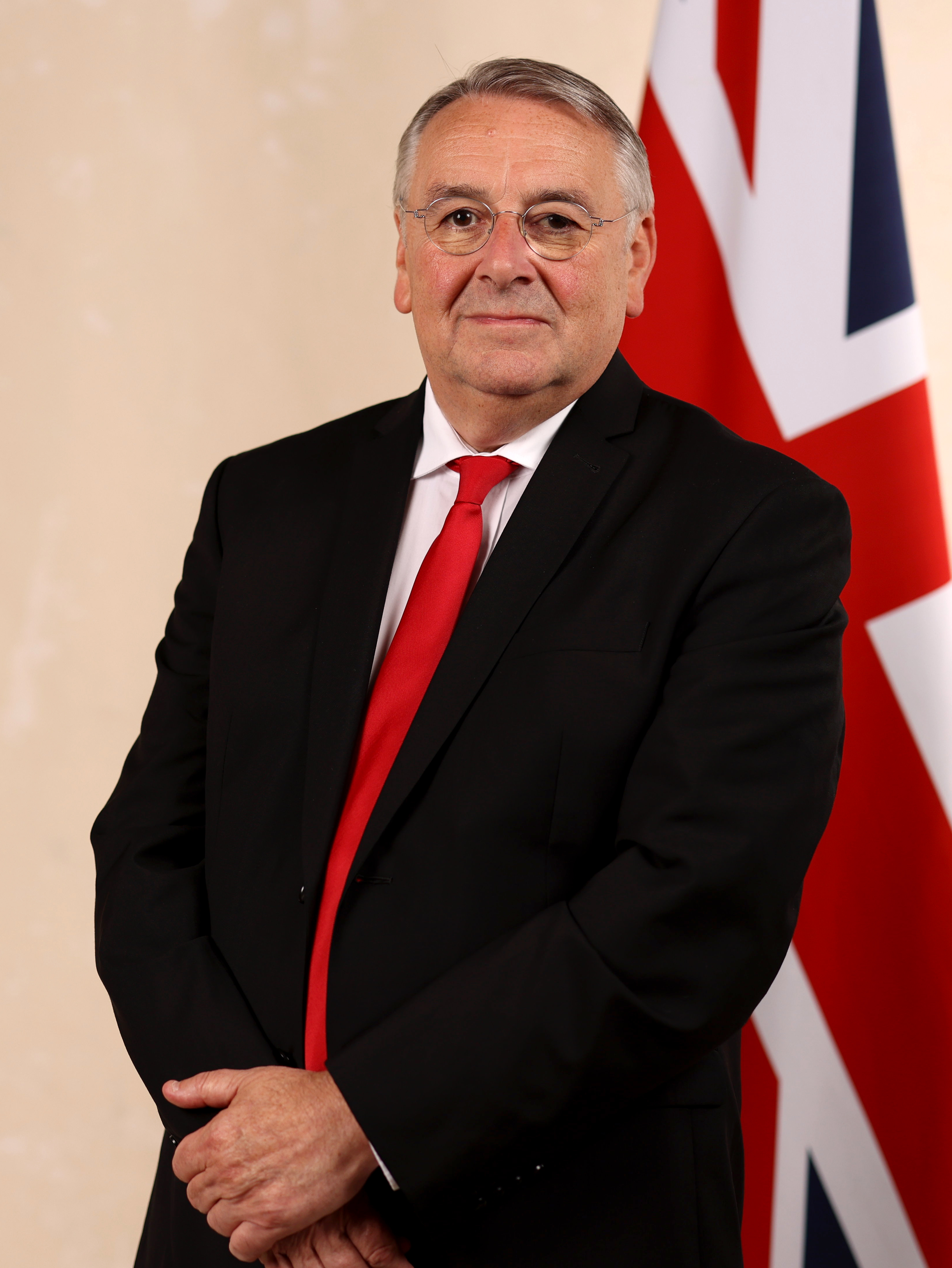
- Incumbent; Alan Campbell since 5 September 2025
- Privy Council of the United Kingdom; Privy Council Office
- Style: The Right Honourable
- Type: Great Officer of State
- Appointer: The Sovereign on advice of the Prime Minister
- Term length: At His Majesty's pleasure
- Formation: 1530
- First holder: The 1st Duke of Suffolk
- Salary: £159,038 per annum (2022) (including £86,584 MP salary)
- Website: privycouncil.independent.gov.uk

The lord president of the Council is the presiding officer of the Privy Council of the United Kingdom and the fourth of the Great Officers of State, ranking above the lord keeper of the privy seal. The lord president usually attends and is responsible for chairing the meetings of the Privy Council, presenting business for the approval of the sovereign.

== The office and its history ==
The Privy Council meets once a month, wherever the sovereign may be residing at the time, to give formal approval to Orders in Council. Only a few privy counsellors need attend such meetings, and only when invited to do so at the government's request. As the duties of the Lord President are not onerous, the post has often been given to a government minister whose responsibilities are not department-specific. In recent years it has been most typical for the Lord President also to serve as Leader of the House of Commons or Leader of the House of Lords. The Lord President has no role in the Judicial Committee of the Privy Council.

President of the Council Act 1529
- Act of Parliament
- Parliament of England
- Long title: An Act that the President of the King's Counsel shall be associate with the Chancellor and Treasurer of England, and the Keeper of the King's Privy Seal.
- Citation: 21 Hen. 8. c. 20
- Territorial extent: England and Wales

Dates
- Royal assent: 17 December 1529
- Commencement: 3 November 1529 (Note: Start of session.)
- Repealed: 30 July 1948
Other legislation
Amended by	Statute Law Revision Act 1863
Repealed by	Statute Law Revision Act 1948

Status: Repealed

Text of statute as originally enacted

In the history of British government, the President of the Council is a relatively recent creation. The first certain appointment to the office was that of the Duke of Suffolk in 1529. Although there is a reference to Edmund Dudley serving as 'president of the council' in 1497, it was only in 1529 that the role was given the style and precedence of a Great Officer of State by the President of the Council Act 1529 (21 Hen. 8. c. 20). Prior to 1679 there were several periods in which the office was left vacant. During coronations of the monarch, the Lord President carries the Sword of State.

In the 19th century, the Lord President was generally the cabinet member responsible for the education system, amongst his other duties. This role was gradually scaled back in the late 19th and early 20th centuries but remnants of it remain, such as the oversight of the governance of various universities.

During times of National or coalition government the office of Lord President has sometimes been held by the leader of a minority party (e.g. Baldwin 1931–1935, MacDonald 1935–1937, Attlee 1943–1945, Clegg 2010–2015). It has been suggested that the office has been intermittently used for Prime Ministerial deputies in the past.

A particularly important role was played by the Lord President of the Council during the Second World War. At this time the Lord President served as chairman of the Lord President's Committee. This committee acted as a central clearing house which dealt with the country's economic problems. This was vital to the smooth running of the British war economy and consequently the entire British war effort.

Winston Churchill, clearly believing that this wartime co-ordinating role was beneficial, introduced a similar but expanded system in the first few years of his post-war premiership. The so-called 'overlord ministers' included Frederick Leathers as Secretary of State for the Co-ordination of Transport, Fuel and Power and Lord Woolton as Lord President. Woolton's job was to co-ordinate the then separate ministries of agriculture and food. A thesis by Michael Kandiah called Woolton was "arguably the most successful of the Overlords" partly because his ministries were quite closely related; indeed, they were merged in 1955 as the Ministry of Agriculture, Fisheries and Food.

On several occasions since 1954, non-British Ministers have served briefly as acting Lords President of the Council, solely to preside over a meeting of the Privy Council held in a Commonwealth realm. Examples of this practice are the meetings in New Zealand in 1990 and 1995, when Geoffrey Palmer and James Bolger respectively were acting Lords President.

Andrea Leadsom's appointment in June 2017 was the first in some time where the post holder was not a full Cabinet member.

== Role and responsibilities ==
=== Routine functions ===
"The Privy Council is the mechanism through which interdepartmental agreement is reached on those items of Government business which, for historical or other reasons, fall to Ministers as Privy Counsellors rather than as Departmental Ministers."

The routine functions of the lord president are as follows:

1. Preside at Privy Council meetings, including any emergency meetings, and attend to both ministerial correspondence and parliamentary questions relating to Privy Council business.
2. Consider for approval prerogative and statutory Orders in Council. Prerogative orders deal with the basic functioning of the British state and are thus applicable under a number of circumstances, including but not limited to the prorogation of Parliament, the granting, amendment, and revocation of royal charters, the appointment of high sheriffs, or the governance of British Overseas Territories. On the other hand, statutory orders are a form of delegated legislation conferred on His Majesty's Government by Parliament for the purposes of creating detailed regulations through rulemaking. Unlike prerogative orders, statutory Orders in Council are subject to parliamentary scrutiny. As a consequence, most Orders in Council operate on statutory footing as opposed to the common law authorities conferred by the royal prerogative.
3. Consider for approval Orders of Council concerning various matters of state, namely appointments to and regulation of professional bodies and institutions of higher education. Unlike Orders in Council which are enacted by the sovereign on the advice of the Privy Council, Orders of Council are enacted by the Privy Council itself pursuant to statutory authority conferred by Parliament.
4. As a member of the Privy Council's Committee for the Affairs of Jersey and Guernsey, review laws passed by the bailiwicks of Jersey and Guernsey, and make recommendations to the sovereign concerning their approval.

=== Visitorial functions ===
In addition to his or her routine functions, the lord president also serves as the visitor for several English universities, including:

- University of Birmingham
- University of Bristol
- University of Hull
- Imperial College London
- Keele University
- University of Leeds
- University of Leicester
- University of Liverpool
- University of London (but not King's College London or University College London)
- University of Nottingham
- University of Reading
- University of Sheffield (but not Sheffield Hallam University)
- University of Southampton
- University of Sussex
- University of Wales

== Partial list of Lords President of the Council ==
=== Lords President of the Council (c. 1530–1702) ===
Lord President of the Council
Lord President	Term of office	
Charles Brandon; 1st Duke of Suffolk	1530	14 August 1545
William Paulet; 1st Marquess of Winchester	January; 1546	February; 1550
John Dudley; 1st Duke of Northumberland	February; 1550	July; 1553
Henry Montagu; 1st Earl of Manchester	September; 1621	July; 1628
James Ley; 1st Earl of Marlborough	July; 1628	14 December 1628
Edward Conway; 1st Viscount Conway	14 December 1628	3 January 1631
Anthony Ashley-Cooper; 1st Earl of Shaftesbury	21 April 1679	15 October 1679
John Robartes; 1st Earl of Radnor	24 October 1679	24 August 1684
Laurence Hyde; 1st Earl of Rochester	24 August 1684	18 February 1685
George Savile; 1st Marquess of Halifax	18 February 1685	4 December 1685
Robert Spencer; 2nd Earl of Sunderland	4 December 1685	October; 1688
Richard Graham; 1st Viscount Preston	October; 1688	December; 1688
Thomas Osborne; 1st Duke of Leeds (Note: Marquess of Carmarthen from 1689, created Duke of Leeds in 1694)	14 February 1689	18 May 1699
Thomas Herbert; 8th Earl of Pembroke	18 May 1699	29 January 1702
Charles Seymour; 6th Duke of Somerset	29 January 1702	13 July 1702

=== Lords President of the Council (1702–present) ===
Lord President		Term of office		Other ministerial portfolios held during tenure	Party	Ministry	Monarch
	Thomas Herbert; 8th Earl of Pembroke	13 July 1702	25 November 1708		—	Godolphin–Marlborough (Tory–Whig)	Anne
	John Somers; 1st Baron Somers	25 November 1708	21 September 1710		Whig	Godolphin–Marlborough (Tory–Whig)	Anne
	Laurence Hyde; 1st Earl of Rochester	21 September 1710	13 June 1711		Tory	Oxford–Bolingbroke	Anne
	John Sheffield; 1st Duke of Buckingham and Normanby	13 June 1711	23 September 1714		—	Oxford–Bolingbroke	Anne
	John Sheffield; 1st Duke of Buckingham and Normanby	13 June 1711	23 September 1714		—	Oxford–Bolingbroke	George I
	Daniel Finch; 2nd Earl of Nottingham	23 September 1714	6 July 1716		Tory	Townshend	George I
	William Cavendish; 2nd Duke of Devonshire	6 July 1716	16 March 1718		Whig	Townshend	George I
	William Cavendish; 2nd Duke of Devonshire	6 July 1716	16 March 1718		Whig	Stanhope–Sunderland I	George I
	Charles Spencer; 3rd Earl of Sunderland	16 March 1718	6 February 1719	First Lord of the Treasury	Whig	Stanhope–Sunderland II	George I
	Evelyn Pierrepont; 1st Duke of Kingston-upon-Hull	6 February 1719	11 June 1720		Whig	Stanhope–Sunderland II	George I
	Charles Townshend; 2nd Viscount Townshend	11 June 1720	25 June 1721	Secretary of State for the Northern Department (Note: Served as Secretary of State for the Northern Department from February 1721)	Whig	Stanhope–Sunderland II	George I
	Charles Townshend; 2nd Viscount Townshend	11 June 1720	25 June 1721	Secretary of State for the Northern Department	Whig	Walpole–Townshend	George I
	Henry Boyle; 1st Baron Carleton	25 June 1721	27 March 1725		Whig	Walpole–Townshend	George I
	William Cavendish; 2nd Duke of Devonshire	27 March 1725	4 June 1729		Whig	Walpole–Townshend	George I
	William Cavendish; 2nd Duke of Devonshire	27 March 1725	4 June 1729		Whig	Walpole–Townshend	George II
	Thomas Trevor; 1st Baron Trevor	8 May 1730	19 June 1730		Tory	Walpole–Townshend	George II
	Spencer Compton; 1st Earl of Wilmington	31 December 1730	13 February 1742		Whig	Walpole	George II
	William Stanhope; 1st Earl of Harrington	13 February 1742	3 January 1745	Secretary of State for the Northern Department (Note: Served as Secretary of State for the Northern Department from November 1744)	Whig	Carteret	George II
	William Stanhope; 1st Earl of Harrington	13 February 1742	3 January 1745	Secretary of State for the Northern Department	Whig	Broad Bottom (I & II)	George II
	Lionel Sackville; 1st Duke of Dorset	3 January 1745	17 June 1751	Lord Lieutenant of Ireland (Note: Lord Lieutenant of Ireland from December 1750)	Whig	Broad Bottom (I & II)	George II
	John Carteret; 2nd Earl Granville	17 June 1751	2 January 1763		Whig	Broad Bottom (I & II)	George II
	John Carteret; 2nd Earl Granville	17 June 1751	2 January 1763		Whig	Newcastle I	George II
	John Carteret; 2nd Earl Granville	17 June 1751	2 January 1763		Whig	Pitt–Devonshire	George II
	John Carteret; 2nd Earl Granville	17 June 1751	2 January 1763		Whig	1757 Caretaker	George II
	John Carteret; 2nd Earl Granville	17 June 1751	2 January 1763		Whig	Pitt–Newcastle	George II
	John Carteret; 2nd Earl Granville	17 June 1751	2 January 1763		Whig	Pitt–Newcastle	George III
	John Carteret; 2nd Earl Granville	17 June 1751	2 January 1763		Whig	Bute	George III
	John Russell; 4th Duke of Bedford	9 September 1763	12 July 1765		Whig	Grenville (Whig–Tory)	George III
	Daniel Finch; 8th Earl of Winchilsea	12 July 1765	30 July 1766		Whig	Rockingham I	George III
	Robert Henley; 1st Earl of Northington	30 July 1766	22 December 1767		Whig	Chatham (Whig–Tory)	George III
	Granville Leveson-Gower; 2nd Earl Gower	22 December 1767	24 November 1779		Tory	Chatham (Whig–Tory)	George III
	Granville Leveson-Gower; 2nd Earl Gower	22 December 1767	24 November 1779		Tory	Grafton (Whig–Tory)	George III
	Granville Leveson-Gower; 2nd Earl Gower	22 December 1767	24 November 1779		Tory	North	George III
	Henry Bathurst; 2nd Earl Bathurst	24 November 1779	27 March 1782		Tory	North	George III
	Charles Pratt; 1st Baron Camden	27 March 1782	2 April 1783		Whig	Rockingham II	George III
	Charles Pratt; 1st Baron Camden	27 March 1782	2 April 1783		Whig	Shelburne (Whig–Tory)	George III
	David Murray; 7th Viscount Stormont	2 April 1783	19 December 1783		Tory	Fox–North (Whig–Tory)	George III
	Granville Leveson-Gower; 2nd Earl Gower	19 December 1783	1 December 1784		Tory	Pitt I	George III
	Charles Pratt; 1st Earl Camden (Note: Baron Camden from 1765; created Earl Camden and Viscount Bayham in 1786)	1 December 1784	18 April 1794		Tory	Pitt I	George III
	William Wentworth-Fitzwilliam; 4th Earl Fitzwilliam	1 July 1794	17 December 1794		Whig	Pitt I	George III
	David Murray; 2nd Earl of Mansfield	17 December 1794	1 September 1796		Tory	Pitt I	George III
	John Pitt; 2nd Earl of Chatham	21 September 1796	30 July 1801	Lord Privy Seal (Note: Lord Privy Seal until February 1798)	—	Pitt I	George III
	John Pitt; 2nd Earl of Chatham	21 September 1796	30 July 1801	Lord Privy Seal	—	Addington	George III
	William Cavendish-Bentinck; 3rd Duke of Portland	30 July 1801	14 January 1805		Tory	Addington	George III
	William Cavendish-Bentinck; 3rd Duke of Portland	30 July 1801	14 January 1805		Tory	Pitt II	George III
	Henry Addington; 1st Viscount Sidmouth	14 January 1805	10 July 1805		Tory	Pitt II	George III
	John Pratt; 2nd Earl Camden	10 July 1805	19 February 1806		Tory	Pitt II	George III
	William Wentworth-Fitzwilliam; 4th Earl Fitzwilliam	19 February 1806	8 October 1806		Whig	All the Talents (Whig–Tory)	George III
	Henry Addington; 1st Viscount Sidmouth	8 October 1806	26 March 1807		Tory	All the Talents (Whig–Tory)	George III
	John Pratt; 2nd Earl Camden	26 March 1807	8 April 1812		Tory	Portland II	George III
	John Pratt; 2nd Earl Camden	26 March 1807	8 April 1812		Tory	Perceval	George III
	Henry Addington; 1st Viscount Sidmouth	8 April 1812	11 June 1812		Tory	Perceval	George III
	Dudley Ryder; 1st Earl of Harrowby	11 June 1812	17 August 1827		Tory	Liverpool	George III
	Dudley Ryder; 1st Earl of Harrowby	11 June 1812	17 August 1827		Tory	Liverpool	George IV
	Dudley Ryder; 1st Earl of Harrowby	11 June 1812	17 August 1827		Tory	Canning (Canningite–Whig)	George IV
	William Cavendish-Scott-Bentinck; 4th Duke of Portland DCL	17 August 1827	28 January 1828		Tory	Goderich (Canningite–Whig)	George IV
	Henry Bathurst; 3rd Earl Bathurst	28 January 1828	22 November 1830		Tory	Wellington–Peel	George IV
	Henry Bathurst; 3rd Earl Bathurst	28 January 1828	22 November 1830		Tory	Wellington–Peel	William IV
	Henry Petty-Fitzmaurice; 3rd Marquess of Lansdowne	22 November 1830	15 November 1834		Whig	Grey	William IV
	Henry Petty-Fitzmaurice; 3rd Marquess of Lansdowne	22 November 1830	15 November 1834		Whig	Melbourne I	William IV
	James St Clair-Erskine; 2nd Earl of Rosslyn	15 December 1834	18 April 1835		Conservative	Peel I	William IV
	Henry Petty-Fitzmaurice; 3rd Marquess of Lansdowne	18 April 1835	3 September 1841		Whig	Melbourne II	William IV
	Henry Petty-Fitzmaurice; 3rd Marquess of Lansdowne	18 April 1835	3 September 1841		Whig	Melbourne II	Victoria
	James Stuart-Wortley; 1st Baron Wharncliffe	3 September 1841	19 December 1845		Conservative	Peel II	Victoria
	Walter Montagu Douglas Scott; 5th Duke of Buccleuch	21 January 1846	6 July 1846		Conservative	Peel II	Victoria
	Henry Petty-Fitzmaurice; 3rd Marquess of Lansdowne	6 July 1846	27 February 1852	Leader of the House of Lords	Whig	Russell I	Victoria
	William Lowther; 2nd Earl of Lonsdale	27 February 1852	28 December 1852		Conservative	Who? Who?	Victoria
	Granville Leveson-Gower; 2nd Earl Granville	28 December 1852	12 June 1854		Whig	Aberdeen (Peelite–Whig)	Victoria
	Lord John Russell; MP for City of London	12 June 1854	8 February 1855	Leader of the House of Commons	Whig	Aberdeen (Peelite–Whig)	Victoria
	Granville Leveson-Gower; 2nd Earl Granville	8 February 1855	26 February 1858	Leader of the House of Lords	Whig	Palmerston I	Victoria
	James Gascoyne-Cecil; 2nd Marquess of Salisbury	26 February 1858	18 June 1859		Conservative	Derby–Disraeli II	Victoria
	Granville Leveson-Gower; 2nd Earl Granville	18 June 1859	6 July 1866	Leader of the House of Lords	Liberal	Palmerston II	Victoria
	Granville Leveson-Gower; 2nd Earl Granville	18 June 1859	6 July 1866	Leader of the House of Lords	Liberal	Russell II	Victoria
	Richard Temple-Nugent-Brydges-Chandos-Grenville; 3rd Duke of Buckingham and Chandos	6 July 1866	8 March 1867		Conservative	Derby–Disraeli III	Victoria
	John Spencer-Churchill; 7th Duke of Marlborough	8 March 1867	9 December 1868		Conservative	Derby–Disraeli III	Victoria
	George Robinson; 1st Marquess of Ripon (Note: Earl of Ripon and Earl de Grey from 1859; created Marquess of Ripon in 1871)	9 December 1868	9 August 1873		Liberal	Gladstone I	Victoria
	Henry Bruce; 1st Baron Aberdare	9 August 1873	21 February 1874		Liberal	Gladstone I	Victoria
	Charles Gordon-Lennox; 6th Duke of Richmond	21 February 1874	28 April 1880	Leader of the House of Lords (Note: Served Leader of the House of Lords until August 1876)	Conservative	Disraeli II	Victoria
	John Spencer; 5th Earl Spencer	28 April 1880	19 March 1883	Lord Lieutenant of Ireland (Note: Served as Lord Lieutenant of Ireland from May 1882)	Liberal	Gladstone II	Victoria
	Chichester Parkinson-Fortescue; 1st Baron Carlingford	19 March 1883	24 June 1885	Lord Privy Seal (Note: Served as Lord Privy Seal until March 1885)	Liberal	Gladstone II	Victoria
	Gathorne Gathorne-Hardy; 1st Viscount Cranbrook	24 June 1885	6 February 1886	Secretary of State for War (Note: Served as Secretary of State for War from January 1886)	Conservative	Salisbury I	Victoria
	John Spencer; 5th Earl Spencer	6 February 1886	3 August 1886		Liberal	Gladstone III	Victoria
	Gathorne Gathorne-Hardy; 1st Viscount Cranbrook	3 August 1886	18 August 1892		Conservative	Salisbury II	Victoria
	John Wodehouse; 1st Earl of Kimberley	18 August 1892	10 March 1894	Secretary of State for India	Liberal	Gladstone IV	Victoria
	Archibald Primrose; 5th Earl of Rosebery	10 March 1894	29 June 1895	Prime Minister; First Lord of the Treasury; Leader of the House of Lords	Liberal	Rosebery	Victoria
	Spencer Cavendish; 8th Duke of Devonshire	29 June 1895	19 October 1903	President of the Board of Education (Note: Served as President of the Board of Education March 1900 – July 1902); Leader of the House of Lords (Note: Served as Leader of the House of Lords from July 1902)	Liberal Unionist	Salisbury (III & IV) (Con.–Lib.U.)	Victoria
	Spencer Cavendish; 8th Duke of Devonshire	29 June 1895	19 October 1903	President of the Board of Education; Leader of the House of Lords	Liberal Unionist	Salisbury (III & IV) (Con.–Lib.U.)	Edward VII
	Spencer Cavendish; 8th Duke of Devonshire	29 June 1895	19 October 1903	President of the Board of Education; Leader of the House of Lords	Liberal Unionist	Balfour (Con.–Lib.U.)	Edward VII
	Charles Vane-Tempest-Stewart; 6th Marquess of Londonderry	19 October 1903	11 December 1905	President of the Board of Education	Conservative	Balfour (Con.–Lib.U.)	Edward VII
	Robert Crewe-Milnes; 1st Earl of Crewe	11 December 1905	16 April 1908		Liberal	Campbell-Bannerman	Edward VII
	Edward Marjoribanks; 2nd Baron Tweedmouth	16 April 1908	19 October 1908		Liberal	Asquith (I–III)	Edward VII
	Henry Fowler; 1st Viscount Wolverhampton	19 October 1908	21 June 1910		Liberal	Asquith (I–III)	Edward VII
	Henry Fowler; 1st Viscount Wolverhampton	19 October 1908	21 June 1910		Liberal	Asquith (I–III)	George V
	William Lygon; 7th Earl Beauchamp	21 June 1910	7 November 1910		Liberal	Asquith (I–III)	George V
	John Morley; 1st Viscount Morley of Blackburn	7 November 1910	5 August 1914	Secretary of State for India (Note: Served as Secretary of State for India March 1911– May 1911)	Liberal	Asquith (I–III)	George V
	William Lygon; 7th Earl Beauchamp	5 August 1914	25 May 1915		Liberal	Asquith (I–III)	George V
	Robert Crewe-Milnes; 1st Marquess of Crewe	25 May 1915	10 December 1916	Leader of the House of Lords; President of the Board of Trade (Note: Served as President of the Board of Trade from August 1916)	Liberal	Asquith Coalition (Lib.–Con.–Lab.)	George V
	George Curzon; 1st Earl Curzon of Kedleston	10 December 1916	23 October 1919	Leader of the House of Lords	Conservative	Lloyd George (I & II) (Lib.–Con.–Lab.)	George V
	Arthur Balfour; 1st Earl of Balfour (Note: MP for City of London until 1922; thereafter created Earl of Balfour and Viscount Traprain and joined the House of Lords)	23 October 1919	19 October 1922		Conservative	Lloyd George (I & II) (Lib.–Con.–Lab.)	George V
	James Gascoyne-Cecil; 4th Marquess of Salisbury	24 October 1922	22 January 1924	Chancellor of the Duchy of Lancaster (Note: Served as Chancellor of the Duchy of Lancaster until May 1923)	Conservative	Law	George V
	James Gascoyne-Cecil; 4th Marquess of Salisbury	24 October 1922	22 January 1924	Chancellor of the Duchy of Lancaster	Conservative	Baldwin I	George V
	Charles Cripps; 1st Baron Parmoor	22 January 1924	3 November 1924		Labour	MacDonald I	George V
	George Curzon; 1st Marquess Curzon of Kedleston	6 November 1924	27 April 1925	Leader of the House of Lords	Conservative	Baldwin II	George V
	Arthur Balfour; 1st Earl of Balfour	27 April 1925	4 June 1929		Conservative	Baldwin II	George V
	Charles Cripps; 1st Baron Parmoor	7 June 1929	24 August 1931	Leader of the House of Lords	Labour	MacDonald II	George V
	Stanley Baldwin; MP for Bewdley	25 August 1931	7 June 1935	Lord Privy Seal (Note: Served as Lord Privy Seal September 1932 – December 1933)	Conservative	National I (N.Lab.–Con.–Lib.N. –Lib.	George V
	Stanley Baldwin; MP for Bewdley	25 August 1931	7 June 1935	Lord Privy Seal	Conservative	National II (N.Lab.–Con.–Lib.N. –Lib. until 1932)	George V
‍	Ramsay MacDonald; MP for Combined Scottish Universities (Note: MP for Seaham until 1935; returned to Parliament as MP for Combined Scottish Universities in 1936)	7 June 1935	28 May 1937		National Labour	National III (Con.–N.Lab.–Lib.N.)	George V
	Ramsay MacDonald; MP for Combined Scottish Universities	7 June 1935	28 May 1937		National Labour	National III (Con.–N.Lab.–Lib.N.)	Edward VIII
	Ramsay MacDonald; MP for Combined Scottish Universities	7 June 1935	28 May 1937		National Labour	National III (Con.–N.Lab.–Lib.N.)	George VI
	Edward Wood; 3rd Viscount Halifax	28 May 1937	9 March 1938	Leader of the House of Lords; Secretary of State for Foreign Affairs (Note: Served as Secretary of State for Foreign Affairs from February 1938)	Conservative	National IV (Con.–N.Lab.–Lib.N.)	George VI
	Douglas Hogg; 1st Viscount Hailsham	9 March 1938	31 October 1938		Conservative	National IV (Con.–N.Lab.–Lib.N.)	George VI
	Walter Runciman; 1st Viscount Runciman of Doxford	31 October 1938	3 September 1939		National Liberal	National IV (Con.–N.Lab.–Lib.N.)	George VI
	James Stanhope; 7th Earl Stanhope	3 September 1939	11 May 1940	Leader of the House of Lords	Conservative	Chamberlain War (Con.–N.Lab.–Lib.N.)	George VI
	Neville Chamberlain; MP for Birmingham Edgbaston	11 May 1940	3 October 1940		Conservative	Churchill War (All parties)	George VI
	John Anderson; MP for Combined Scottish Universities	3 October 1940	24 September 1943		National	Churchill War (All parties)	George VI
	Clement Attlee; MP for Limehouse	24 September 1943	23 May 1945	Deputy Prime Minister	Labour	Churchill War (All parties)	George VI
	Frederick Marquis; 1st Baron Woolton	25 May 1945	26 July 1945		National	Churchill Caretaker (Con.–Lib.N.)	George VI
	Herbert Morrison; MP for Lewisham South (Note: MP for Lewisham East until 1950; MP for Lewisham South thereafter.)	27 July 1945	9 March 1951	Deputy Prime Minister; Leader of the House of Commons	Labour	Attlee (I & II)	George VI
	Christopher Addison; 1st Viscount Addison	9 March 1951	26 October 1951	Leader of the House of Lords	Labour	Attlee (I & II)	George VI
	Frederick Marquis; 1st Baron Woolton	28 October 1951	25 November 1952		Conservative	Churchill III	George VI
	Frederick Marquis; 1st Baron Woolton	28 October 1951	25 November 1952		Conservative	Churchill III	Elizabeth II
	Robert Gascoyne-Cecil; 5th Marquess of Salisbury	25 November 1952	29 March 1957	Leader of the House of Lords	Conservative	Churchill III	Elizabeth II
	Robert Gascoyne-Cecil; 5th Marquess of Salisbury	25 November 1952	29 March 1957	Leader of the House of Lords	Conservative	Eden	Elizabeth II
	Robert Gascoyne-Cecil; 5th Marquess of Salisbury	25 November 1952	29 March 1957	Leader of the House of Lords	Conservative	Macmillan (I & II)	Elizabeth II
	Alec Douglas-Home; 14th Earl of Home	29 March 1957	17 September 1957	Leader of the House of Lords	Conservative	Macmillan (I & II)	Elizabeth II
	Quintin Hogg; 2nd Viscount Hailsham	17 September 1957	14 October 1959		Conservative	Macmillan (I & II)	Elizabeth II
	Alec Douglas-Home; 14th Earl of Home	14 October 1959	27 July 1960	Leader of the House of Lords	Conservative	Macmillan (I & II)	Elizabeth II
	Quintin Hogg; MP for St Marylebone (Note: Viscount Hailsham until 1963 when disclaimed under the Peerage Act 1963; returned to Parliament as MP for St. Marylebone in 1963)	27 July 1960	16 October 1964	Leader of the House of Lords (Note: Served as Leader of the House of Lords until October 1963); Minister for Science (Note: Served as Minister for Science from November 1959 – April 1964); Secretary of State for Education and Science (Note: Served as Secretary of State for Education and Science from April 1964)	Conservative	Macmillan (I & II)	Elizabeth II
	Quintin Hogg; MP for St Marylebone	27 July 1960	16 October 1964	Leader of the House of Lords; Minister for Science; Secretary of State for Education and Science	Conservative	Douglas-Home	Elizabeth II
	Herbert Bowden; MP for Leicester South West	16 October 1964	11 August 1966	Leader of the House of Commons	Labour	Wilson (I & II)	Elizabeth II
	Richard Crossman; MP for Coventry East	11 August 1966	18 October 1968	Leader of the House of Commons	Labour	Wilson (I & II)	Elizabeth II
	Fred Peart; MP for Workington	18 October 1968	19 June 1970	Leader of the House of Commons	Labour	Wilson (I & II)	Elizabeth II
	William Whitelaw; MP for Penrith and The Border	20 June 1970	7 April 1972	Leader of the House of Commons	Conservative	Heath	Elizabeth II
	Robert Carr; MP for Mitcham	7 April 1972	5 November 1972	Leader of the House of Commons	Conservative	Heath	Elizabeth II
	Jim Prior; MP for Lowestoft	5 November 1972	4 March 1974	Leader of the House of Commons	Conservative	Heath	Elizabeth II
	Edward Short; MP for Newcastle upon Tyne Central	5 March 1974	8 April 1976	Leader of the House of Commons	Labour	Wilson (III & IV)	Elizabeth II
	Michael Foot; MP for Ebbw Vale	8 April 1976	4 May 1979	Leader of the House of Commons	Labour	Callaghan	Elizabeth II
	Christopher Soames; Baron Soames	5 May 1979	14 September 1981	Leader of the House of Lords	Conservative	Thatcher I	Elizabeth II
	Francis Pym; MP for Cambridgeshire	14 September 1981	7 April 1982	Leader of the House of Commons	Conservative	Thatcher I	Elizabeth II
	John Biffen; MP for Oswestry	7 April 1982	11 June 1983	Leader of the House of Commons	Conservative	Thatcher I	Elizabeth II
	William Whitelaw; 1st Viscount Whitelaw	11 June 1983	10 January 1988	Leader of the House of Lords	Conservative	Thatcher II	Elizabeth II
	William Whitelaw; 1st Viscount Whitelaw	11 June 1983	10 January 1988	Leader of the House of Lords	Conservative	Thatcher III	Elizabeth II
	John Wakeham; MP for South Colchester and Maldon	10 January 1988	24 July 1989	Leader of the House of Commons	Conservative	Thatcher III	Elizabeth II
	Geoffrey Howe; MP for East Surrey	24 July 1989	1 November 1990	Deputy Prime Minister; Leader of the House of Commons	Conservative	Thatcher III	Elizabeth II
	John MacGregor; MP for South Norfolk	2 November 1990	10 April 1992	Leader of the House of Commons	Conservative	Thatcher III	Elizabeth II
	John MacGregor; MP for South Norfolk	2 November 1990	10 April 1992	Leader of the House of Commons	Conservative	Major I	Elizabeth II
	Tony Newton; MP for Braintree	10 April 1992	2 May 1997	Leader of the House of Commons	Conservative	Major II	Elizabeth II
	Ann Taylor; MP for Dewsbury	2 May 1997	27 July 1998	Leader of the House of Commons	Labour	Blair I	Elizabeth II
	Margaret Beckett; MP for Derby South	27 July 1998	8 June 2001	Leader of the House of Commons	Labour	Blair I	Elizabeth II
	Robin Cook; MP for Livingston	8 June 2001	18 March 2003	Leader of the House of Commons	Labour	Blair II	Elizabeth II
	John Reid; MP for Hamilton North and Bellshill	4 April 2003	13 June 2003	Leader of the House of Commons	Labour	Blair II	Elizabeth II
	Gareth Williams; Baron Williams of Mostyn	13 June 2003	20 September 2003	Leader of the House of Lords	Labour	Blair II	Elizabeth II
	Valerie Amos; Baroness Amos	6 October 2003	28 June 2007	Leader of the House of Lords	Labour	Blair II	Elizabeth II
	Valerie Amos; Baroness Amos	6 October 2003	28 June 2007	Leader of the House of Lords	Labour	Blair III	Elizabeth II
	Catherine Ashton; Baroness Ashton of Upholland	28 June 2007	3 October 2008	Leader of the House of Lords	Labour	Brown	Elizabeth II
	Janet Royall; Baroness Royall of Blaisdon	3 October 2008	5 June 2009	Leader of the House of Lords	Labour	Brown	Elizabeth II
	Peter Mandelson; Baron Mandelson	5 June 2009	11 May 2010	First Secretary of State; Secretary of State for Business, Innovation and Skills	Labour	Brown	Elizabeth II
	Nick Clegg; MP for Sheffield Hallam	12 May 2010	8 May 2015	Deputy Prime Minister (Note: With special responsibility for political and constitutional reform)	Liberal Democrat	Cameron–Clegg (Con.–Lib.Dem.)	Elizabeth II
	Chris Grayling; MP for Epsom and Ewell	9 May 2015	14 July 2016	Leader of the House of Commons	Conservative	Cameron II	Elizabeth II
	David Lidington; MP for Aylesbury	14 July 2016	11 June 2017	Leader of the House of Commons	Conservative	May I	Elizabeth II
	Andrea Leadsom; MP for South Northamptonshire	11 June 2017	22 May 2019	Leader of the House of Commons	Conservative	May II	Elizabeth II
	Mel Stride; MP for Central Devon	23 May 2019	24 July 2019	Leader of the House of Commons	Conservative	May II	Elizabeth II
	Jacob Rees-Mogg; MP for North East Somerset	24 July 2019	8 February 2022	Leader of the House of Commons	Conservative	Johnson I	Elizabeth II
	Jacob Rees-Mogg; MP for North East Somerset	24 July 2019	8 February 2022	Leader of the House of Commons	Conservative	Johnson II	Elizabeth II
	Mark Spencer; MP for Sherwood	8 February 2022	6 September 2022	Leader of the House of Commons	Conservative	Johnson II	Elizabeth II
‍	Penny Mordaunt; MP for Portsmouth North	6 September 2022	5 July 2024	Leader of the House of Commons	Conservative	Truss	Elizabeth II
	Penny Mordaunt; MP for Portsmouth North	6 September 2022	5 July 2024	Leader of the House of Commons	Conservative	Truss	Charles III
	Penny Mordaunt; MP for Portsmouth North	6 September 2022	5 July 2024	Leader of the House of Commons	Conservative	Sunak	Charles III
‍	Lucy Powell; MP for Manchester Central	5 July 2024	5 September 2025	Leader of the House of Commons	Labour	Starmer	Charles III
‍	Alan Campbell; MP for Tynemouth	5 September 2025	Incumbent	Leader of the House of Commons	Labour	Starmer	Charles III
‍	Alan Campbell; MP for Tynemouth	5 September 2025	Incumbent	Leader of the House of Commons	Labour	Burnham	Charles III

== See also ==
- Privy Council Office
- Vice-President of the Executive Council
- President of the King's Privy Council for Canada
- Sinecure

== Sources ==
- Chisholm, Hugh, ed. (1911). "Lord President of the Council". Encyclopædia Britannica (11th ed.). Cambridge University Press.
