= List of British governments =

This article lists successive British governments, also referred to as ministries, from the creation of the Kingdom of Great Britain in 1707, continuing through the duration of the United Kingdom of Great Britain and Ireland from 1801 to 1922, and since then dealing with those of the present-day United Kingdom of Great Britain and Northern Ireland.

== Guide to the list ==
"Ministry" refers collectively to all the ministers of a government, including Cabinet members and junior ministers alike. Only the Civil Service is considered outside of the ministry. While the term was in common parlance in the 19th and early 20th centuries, it has become rarer, except in official and academic uses. Both Australia and Canada have inherited the term and continue to use it. It is perhaps in more common use in those countries, which both have official catalogues of their respective ministries, whereas Britain has no such catalogue.

Articles listed by ministry contain information on the term(s) of one prime minister. Articles listed by political party contain information on the ministries of multiple consecutive prime ministers of the same political party. Prior to the 20th century, the leader of the British government held the title of First Lord of the Treasury, and not that of Prime Minister of the United Kingdom. Therefore, the list below refers to the "Head of Government" and not the "Prime Minister". Even so, the leader of a government was often colloquially referred to as the "prime minister", beginning in the 18th century. Since 1902, prime ministers have always held the office of First Lord of the Treasury.

== Ministries ==
Colour key
- Whig
- Tory
- Conservative
- Peelite
- Liberal
- Labour
- National Labour
- Liberal Democrats

Start date		Government	Event (Note: General elections, successful votes of no confidence, etc.)	Head	Governing party		Monarch
1707		Godolphin–Marlborough ministry	Acts of Union	Duke of Marlborough	Tory	Whig	Anne
1708		Godolphin–Marlborough ministry	General election	Duke of Marlborough	Tory	Whig	Anne
Aug	1710	Godolphin–Marlborough ministry	Dismissal	Marlborough dismissed	Tory	Whig	Anne
Nov	1710	Harley ministry	General election	Robert Harley (Note: From 1711 Harley was Earl of Oxford and Earl Mortimer.)	Tory		Anne
1713		Harley ministry	General election	Robert Harley	Tory		Anne
Aug	1714	Harley ministry	Accession	Robert Harley	Tory		George I
Sep	1714	Townshend ministry	—N/a	Viscount Townshend (Note: De facto leader as Northern Secretary.)	Whig		George I
1715		Townshend ministry	General election	Viscount Townshend	Whig		George I
1717		First Stanhope–Sunderland ministry	—N/a	Earl Stanhope	Whig		George I
1718		Second Stanhope–Sunderland ministry	—N/a	Earl Stanhope	Whig		George I
Feb	1721	Second Stanhope–Sunderland ministry	Death	Stanhope dies	Whig		George I
Apr	1721	Walpole–Townshend ministry	—N/a	Robert Walpole (Note: From 1742 Walpole was Earl of Orford.)	Whig		George I
1722		Walpole–Townshend ministry	General election	Robert Walpole	Whig		George I
Jun	1727	Walpole–Townshend ministry	Accession	Robert Walpole	Whig		George II
Aug	1727	Walpole–Townshend ministry	General election	Robert Walpole	Whig		George II
1730		Walpole ministry	Townshend resigns	Robert Walpole	Whig		George II
1734		Walpole ministry	General election	Robert Walpole	Whig		George II
1741		Walpole ministry	General election	Robert Walpole	Whig		George II
11 Feb	1742	Walpole ministry	No confidence	Walpole resigns	Whig		George II
12 Feb	1742	Carteret ministry	—N/a	Lord Carteret (acting)	Whig		George II
16 Feb	1742	Carteret ministry	—N/a	Earl of Wilmington	Whig		George II
Jul	1743	Carteret ministry	Death	Wilmington dies	Whig		George II
Aug	1743	Carteret ministry	—N/a	Henry Pelham	Whig		George II
1744		First Broad Bottom ministry	—N/a	Henry Pelham	Whig		George II
10 Feb	1746	First Broad Bottom ministry	Dismissal (Note: In 1746 William Pulteney, 1st Earl of Bath, formed a short-lived ministry. He was ultimately unsuccessful and is not generally included in lists of British prime ministers.)	Pelham dismissed	Whig		George II
14 Feb	1746	Second Broad Bottom ministry	—N/a	Henry Pelham	Whig		George II
1747		Second Broad Bottom ministry	General election	Henry Pelham	Whig		George II
6 Mar	1754	Second Broad Bottom ministry	Death	Pelham dies	Whig		George II
16 Mar	1754	First Newcastle ministry	—N/a	Duke of Newcastle	Whig		George II
Apr	1754	First Newcastle ministry	General election	Duke of Newcastle	Whig		George II
11 Nov	1756	First Newcastle ministry	Resignation	Newcastle resigns	Whig		George II
16 Nov	1756	Pitt–Devonshire ministry	—N/a	Duke of Devonshire	Whig		George II
Apr	1757	1757 caretaker ministry	Pitt dismissed	Duke of Devonshire	Whig (caretaker)		George II
Jun	1757	Pitt–Newcastle ministry	—N/a	Duke of Newcastle	Whig		George II
1760		Pitt–Newcastle ministry	Accession	Duke of Newcastle	Whig		George III
Mar	1761	Pitt–Newcastle ministry	General election	Duke of Newcastle	Whig		George III
Oct	1761	Pitt–Newcastle ministry	Pitt resigns	Duke of Newcastle	Whig		George III
Oct	1761	Bute–Newcastle coalition	—N/a	Duke of Newcastle	Tory	Whig	George III
1762		Bute–Newcastle coalition	Dismissal	Newcastle dismissed	Tory	Whig	George III
1762		Bute ministry	—N/a	Earl of Bute	Tory	Whig	George III
8 Apr	1763	Bute ministry	Resignation	Bute resigns	Tory	Whig	George III
16 Apr	1763	Grenville ministry	—N/a	George Grenville	Tory	Grenville; Whig	George III
10 Jul	1765	Grenville ministry	Dismissal	Grenville dismissed	Tory	Grenville; Whig	George III
13 Jul	1765	First Rockingham ministry	—N/a	Marquess of Rockingham	Rockingham Whig		George III
1766		Chatham ministry	—N/a	Earl of Chatham	Chathamite; Whig	Tory	George III
Mar	1768	Chatham ministry	General election	Earl of Chatham	Chathamite; Whig	Tory	George III
Oct	1768	Grafton ministry	—N/a	Duke of Grafton	Chathamite; Whig	Tory	George III
1770		North ministry	—N/a	Lord North	Northite Tory	Whig	George III
1774		North ministry	General election	Lord North	Northite Tory		George III
1780		North ministry	General election	Lord North	Northite Tory		George III
Mar	1782	North ministry	No confidence	Lord North	Northite Tory		George III
Mar	1782	Second Rockingham ministry	—N/a	Marquess of Rockingham	Rockingham Whig		George III
1 Jul	1782	Second Rockingham ministry	Death	Rockingham dies	Rockingham Whig		George III
4 Jul	1782	Shelburne ministry	—N/a	Earl of Shelburne	Chathamite; Whig	Tory	George III
Mar	1783	Shelburne ministry	Resignation	Shelburne resigns	Chathamite; Whig	Tory	George III
Apr	1783	Fox–North coalition	—N/a	Duke of Portland	Whig	Tory	George III
18 Dec	1783	Fox–North coalition	Dismissal	Portland dismissed	Whig	Tory	George III
19 Dec	1783	First Pitt ministry	—N/a	William Pitt	Pittite Tory (minority)		George III
Feb	1784	First Pitt ministry	No confidence	William Pitt	Pittite Tory (minority)		George III
Mar	1784	First Pitt ministry	General election	William Pitt	Pittite Tory		George III
1790		First Pitt ministry	General election	William Pitt	Pittite Tory		George III
1796		First Pitt ministry	General election	William Pitt	Pittite Tory	Whig	George III
14 Mar	1801	First Pitt ministry	Resignation	Pitt resigns	Pittite Tory	Whig	George III
17 Mar	1801	Addington ministry	—N/a	Henry Addington	Addingtonian Tory		George III
1802		Addington ministry	General election	Henry Addington	Addingtonian Tory		George III
1804		Second Pitt ministry	—N/a	William Pitt	Pittite Tory		George III
Jan	1806	Second Pitt ministry	Death	Pitt dies	Pittite Tory		George III
Feb	1806	Ministry of All the Talents	—N/a	Lord Grenville	Whig	Tory	George III
Oct	1806	Ministry of All the Talents	General election	Lord Grenville	Whig	Tory	George III
Mar	1807	Second Portland ministry	—N/a	Duke of Portland	Pittite Tory (minority)		George III
May	1807	Second Portland ministry	General election	Duke of Portland	Pittite Tory		George III
1809		Perceval ministry	—N/a	Spencer Perceval	Pittite Tory		George III
May	1812	Perceval ministry	Assassination	Perceval assassinated	Pittite Tory		George III
Jun	1812	Liverpool ministry	—N/a	Earl of Liverpool	Pittite Tory		George III
Oct	1812	Liverpool ministry	General election	Earl of Liverpool	Pittite Tory		George III
1818		Liverpool ministry	General election	Earl of Liverpool	Pittite Tory		George III
Jan	1820	Liverpool ministry	Accession	Earl of Liverpool	Pittite Tory		George IV
Mar	1820	Liverpool ministry	General election	Earl of Liverpool	Pittite Tory		George IV
1826		Liverpool ministry	General election	Earl of Liverpool	Pittite Tory		George IV
9 Apr	1827	Liverpool ministry	Resignation	Liverpool resigns	Pittite Tory		George IV
12 Apr	1827	Canning ministry	—N/a	George Canning	Canningite; Tory	Whig	George IV
8 Aug	1827	Canning ministry	Death	Canning dies	Canningite; Tory	Whig	George IV
31 Aug	1827	Goderich ministry	—N/a	Viscount Goderich	Canningite; Tory	Whig	George IV
8 Jan	1828	Goderich ministry	Resignation	Goderich resigns	Canningite; Tory	Whig	George IV
22 Jan	1828	Wellington–Peel ministry	—N/a	Duke of Wellington	Tory		George IV
Jun	1830	Wellington–Peel ministry	Accession	Duke of Wellington	Tory		William IV
Jul	1830	Wellington–Peel ministry	General election	Duke of Wellington	Tory (minority)		William IV
16 Nov	1830	Wellington–Peel ministry	No confidence	Wellington resigns	Tory (minority)		William IV
22 Nov	1830	Grey ministry	—N/a	Earl Grey	Whig (minority)		William IV
1831		Grey ministry	General election	Earl Grey	Whig		William IV
1832		Grey ministry	General election	Earl Grey	Whig		William IV
9 Jul	1834	Grey ministry	Resignation	Grey resigns	Whig		William IV
16 Jul	1834	First Melbourne ministry	—N/a	Viscount Melbourne	Whig		William IV
14 Nov	1834	First Melbourne ministry	Dismissal	Melbourne dismissed	Whig		William IV
17 Nov	1834	Wellington caretaker ministry	—N/a	Duke of Wellington	Tory (caretaker)		William IV
9 Dec	1834	Wellington caretaker ministry	Resignation	Wellington resigns	Tory (caretaker)		William IV
10 Dec	1834	First Peel ministry	—N/a	Robert Peel	Conservative (minority)		William IV
Jan	1835	First Peel ministry	General election	Robert Peel	Conservative (minority)		William IV
8 Apr	1835	First Peel ministry	No confidence	Peel resigns	Conservative (minority)		William IV
18 Apr	1835	Second Melbourne ministry	—N/a	Viscount Melbourne	Whig		William IV
Jun	1837	Second Melbourne ministry	Accession	Viscount Melbourne	Whig		Victoria
Jul	1837	Second Melbourne ministry	General election	Viscount Melbourne	Whig		Victoria
4 Jun	1841	Second Melbourne ministry	No confidence	Viscount Melbourne	Whig		Victoria
29 Jun	1841	Second Melbourne ministry	General election	Viscount Melbourne	Whig		Victoria
Aug	1841	Second Melbourne ministry	No confidence	Viscount Melbourne	Whig		Victoria
Aug	1841	Second Peel ministry	—N/a	Robert Peel	Conservative		Victoria
29 Jun	1846	Second Peel ministry	No confidence	Peel resigns	Conservative		Victoria
30 Jun	1846	First Russell ministry	—N/a	Lord John Russell	Whig (minority)		Victoria
1847		First Russell ministry	General election	Lord John Russell	Whig (minority)		Victoria
1851		First Russell ministry	No confidence	Lord John Russell	Whig (minority)		Victoria
21 Feb	1852	First Russell ministry	No confidence	Russell resigns	Whig (minority)		Victoria
23 Feb	1852	Who? Who? ministry	—N/a	Earl of Derby	Conservative (minority)		Victoria
Jul	1852	Who? Who? ministry	General election	Earl of Derby	Conservative		Victoria
17 Dec	1852	Who? Who? ministry	No confidence	Derby resigns	Conservative		Victoria
19 Dec	1852	Aberdeen ministry	—N/a	Earl of Aberdeen	Coalition (minority)		Victoria
Jan	1855	Aberdeen ministry	No confidence	Aberdeen resigns	Coalition (minority)		Victoria
Feb	1855	First Palmerston ministry	—N/a	Viscount Palmerston	Whig (minority)		Victoria
3 Mar	1857	First Palmerston ministry	No confidence	Viscount Palmerston	Whig (minority)		Victoria
27 Mar	1857	First Palmerston ministry	General election	Viscount Palmerston	Whig		Victoria
19 Feb	1858	First Palmerston ministry	No confidence	Palmerston resigns	Whig		Victoria
20 Feb	1858	Second Derby–Disraeli ministry	—N/a	Earl of Derby	Conservative (minority)		Victoria
Apr	1859	Second Derby–Disraeli ministry	General election	Earl of Derby	Conservative (minority)		Victoria
11 Jun	1859	Second Derby–Disraeli ministry	No confidence	Derby resigns	Conservative (minority)		Victoria
12 Jun	1859	Second Palmerston ministry	—N/a	Viscount Palmerston	Liberal		Victoria
Jul	1865	Second Palmerston ministry	General election	Viscount Palmerston	Liberal		Victoria
18 Oct	1865	Second Palmerston ministry	Death	Palmerston dies	Liberal		Victoria
29 Oct	1865	Second Russell ministry	—N/a	Earl Russell	Liberal		Victoria
26 Jun	1866	Second Russell ministry	No confidence	Russell resigns	Liberal		Victoria
28 Jun	1866	Third Derby–Disraeli ministry	—N/a	Earl of Derby	Conservative (minority)		Victoria
25 Feb	1868	Third Derby–Disraeli ministry	Resignation	Derby resigns	Conservative (minority)		Victoria
27 Feb	1868	Third Derby–Disraeli ministry	—N/a	Benjamin Disraeli	Conservative (minority)		Victoria
1 Dec	1868	Third Derby–Disraeli ministry	Resignation	Disraeli resigns	Conservative (minority)		Victoria
3 Dec	1868	First Gladstone ministry	General election	William Ewart Gladstone	Liberal		Victoria
1873		First Gladstone ministry	No confidence	William Ewart Gladstone	Liberal		Victoria
17 Feb	1874	First Gladstone ministry	Resignation	Gladstone resigns	Liberal		Victoria
20 Feb	1874	Second Disraeli ministry	General election	Benjamin Disraeli (Note: From 1876 Disraeli was Earl of Beaconsfield.)	Conservative		Victoria
21 Apr	1880	Second Disraeli ministry	Resignation	Disraeli resigns	Conservative		Victoria
23 Apr	1880	Second Gladstone ministry	General election	William Ewart Gladstone	Liberal		Victoria
9 Jun	1885	Second Gladstone ministry	No confidence	Gladstone resigns	Liberal		Victoria
23 Jun	1885	First Salisbury ministry	—N/a	Marquess of Salisbury	Conservative (minority)		Victoria
Nov	1885	First Salisbury ministry	General election	Marquess of Salisbury	Conservative (caretaker) (Note: Typically, as in these instances when an election produces a hung parliament, an incumbent government briefly continues in an acting capacity.)		Victoria
Jan	1886	First Salisbury ministry	No confidence	Salisbury resigns	Conservative (caretaker)		Victoria
Feb	1886	Third Gladstone ministry	—N/a	William Ewart Gladstone	Liberal (minority)		Victoria
20 Jul	1886	Third Gladstone ministry	No confidence	Gladstone resigns	Liberal (minority)		Victoria
25 Jul	1886	Second Salisbury ministry	General election	Marquess of Salisbury	Conservative (minority)		Victoria
Jul	1892	Second Salisbury ministry	General election	Marquess of Salisbury	Conservative (caretaker)		Victoria
11 Aug	1892	Second Salisbury ministry	No confidence	Salisbury resigns	Conservative (caretaker)		Victoria
15 Aug	1892	Fourth Gladstone ministry	—N/a	William Ewart Gladstone	Liberal (minority)		Victoria
2 Mar	1894	Fourth Gladstone ministry	Resignation	Gladstone resigns	Liberal (minority)		Victoria
5 Mar	1894	Rosebery ministry	—N/a	Earl of Rosebery	Liberal (minority)		Victoria
22 Jun	1895	Rosebery ministry	No confidence	Rosebery resigns	Liberal (minority)		Victoria
25 Jun	1895	Third Salisbury ministry	—N/a	Marquess of Salisbury	Conservative (minority)		Victoria
Jul	1895	Third Salisbury ministry	General election	Marquess of Salisbury	Conservative	Liberal; Unionist	Victoria
1900		Fourth Salisbury ministry	General election	Marquess of Salisbury	Conservative	Liberal; Unionist	Victoria
1901		Fourth Salisbury ministry	Accession	Marquess of Salisbury	Conservative	Liberal; Unionist	Edward VII
11 Jul	1902	Fourth Salisbury ministry	Resignation	Salisbury resigns	Conservative	Liberal; Unionist	Edward VII
12 Jul	1902	Balfour ministry	—N/a	Arthur Balfour	Conservative	Liberal; Unionist	Edward VII
4 Dec	1905	Balfour ministry	Resignation	Balfour resigns	Conservative	Liberal; Unionist	Edward VII
5 Dec	1905	Campbell-Bannerman ministry	—N/a	Henry Campbell-Bannerman	Liberal (minority)		Edward VII
1906		Campbell-Bannerman ministry	General election	Henry Campbell-Bannerman	Liberal		Edward VII
1908		First Asquith ministry	—N/a	H. H. Asquith	Liberal		Edward VII
Feb	1910	Second Asquith ministry	General election	H. H. Asquith	Liberal (minority)		Edward VII
May	1910	Second Asquith ministry	Accession	H. H. Asquith	Liberal (minority)		George V
Dec	1910	Third Asquith ministry	General election	H. H. Asquith	Liberal (minority)		George V
1915		Asquith coalition ministry	—N/a	H. H. Asquith	Coalition		George V
5 Dec	1916	Asquith coalition ministry	Resignation	Asquith resigns	Coalition		George V
6 Dec	1916	Lloyd George war ministry	—N/a	David Lloyd George	Coalition		George V
1918		Second Lloyd George ministry	General election	David Lloyd George	Coalition		George V
19 Oct	1922	Second Lloyd George ministry	Carlton Club meeting	Lloyd George resigns	Coalition		George V
23 Oct	1922	Law ministry	—N/a	Bonar Law	Conservative		George V
Nov	1922	Law ministry	General election	Bonar Law	Conservative		George V
20 May	1923	Law ministry	Resignation	Law resigns	Conservative		George V
22 May	1923	First Baldwin ministry	—N/a	Stanley Baldwin	Conservative		George V
Dec	1923	First Baldwin ministry	General election	Stanley Baldwin	Conservative (caretaker)		George V
Jan	1924	First Baldwin ministry	No confidence	Stanley Baldwin	Conservative (caretaker)		George V
Jan	1924	First MacDonald ministry	—N/a	Ramsay MacDonald	Labour (minority)		George V
Nov	1924	First MacDonald ministry	No confidence	Ramsay MacDonald	Labour (minority)		George V
Nov	1924	Second Baldwin ministry	General election	Stanley Baldwin	Conservative		George V
May	1929	Second Baldwin ministry	General election	Stanley Baldwin	Conservative (caretaker)		George V
4 Jun	1929	Second Baldwin ministry	Resignation	Baldwin resigns	Conservative (caretaker)		George V
5 Jun	1929	Second MacDonald ministry	Lib–Lab pact	Ramsay MacDonald	Labour (minority)		George V
Aug	1931	First National Government	—N/a	Ramsay MacDonald	National		George V
Oct	1931	Second National Government	General election	Ramsay MacDonald	National		George V
1935		Third National Government	General election	Stanley Baldwin	National		George V
Jan	1936	Third National Government	Accession	Stanley Baldwin	National		Edward VIII
Dec	1936	Third National Government	Abdication	Stanley Baldwin	National		Edward VIII
Dec	1936	Third National Government	Accession	Stanley Baldwin	National		George VI
1937		Fourth National Government	—N/a	Neville Chamberlain	National		George VI
1939		Chamberlain war ministry	—N/a	Neville Chamberlain	National		George VI
1940		Churchill war ministry	Norway Debate	Winston Churchill	Coalition		George VI
May	1945	Churchill caretaker ministry	Coalition resigns	Winston Churchill	Coalition (caretaker)		George VI
Jul	1945	First Attlee ministry	General election	Clement Attlee	Labour		George VI
1950		Second Attlee ministry	General election	Clement Attlee	Labour		George VI
1951		Third Churchill ministry	General election	Winston Churchill	Conservative		George VI
1952		Third Churchill ministry	Accession	Winston Churchill	Conservative		Elizabeth II
5 Apr	1955	Third Churchill ministry	Resignation	Churchill resigns	Conservative		Elizabeth II
6 Apr	1955	Eden ministry	—N/a	Anthony Eden	Conservative		Elizabeth II
May	1955	Eden ministry	General election	Anthony Eden	Conservative		Elizabeth II
1957		First Macmillan ministry	—N/a	Harold Macmillan	Conservative		Elizabeth II
1959		Second Macmillan ministry	General election	Harold Macmillan	Conservative		Elizabeth II
18 Oct	1963	Second Macmillan ministry	Resignation	Macmillan resigns	Conservative		Elizabeth II
19 Oct	1963	Douglas-Home ministry	—N/a	Alec Douglas-Home (Note: For the first five days of his ministry, until he had renounced his peerage, Douglas-Home was known as the Earl of Home.)	Conservative		Elizabeth II
1964		First Wilson ministry	General election	Harold Wilson	Labour		Elizabeth II
1966		Second Wilson ministry	General election	Harold Wilson	Labour		Elizabeth II
1970		Heath ministry	General election	Edward Heath	Conservative		Elizabeth II
Feb	1974	Heath ministry	General election	Edward Heath	Conservative (caretaker)		Elizabeth II
Mar	1974	Third Wilson ministry	General election	Harold Wilson	Labour (minority)		Elizabeth II
Oct	1974	Fourth Wilson ministry	General election	Harold Wilson	Labour		Elizabeth II
1976		Callaghan ministry	Leadership election	James Callaghan	Labour		Elizabeth II
1977		Callaghan ministry	Lib–Lab pact	James Callaghan	Labour (minority)		Elizabeth II
Mar	1979	Callaghan ministry	No confidence	James Callaghan	Labour (minority)		Elizabeth II
May	1979	First Thatcher ministry	General election	Margaret Thatcher	Conservative		Elizabeth II
1983		Second Thatcher ministry	General election	Margaret Thatcher	Conservative		Elizabeth II
1987		Third Thatcher ministry	General election	Margaret Thatcher	Conservative		Elizabeth II
1990		First Major ministry	Leadership election	John Major	Conservative		Elizabeth II
1992		Second Major ministry	General election	John Major	Conservative		Elizabeth II
1996		Second Major ministry	By-election	John Major	Conservative (minority)		Elizabeth II
1997		First Blair ministry	General election	Tony Blair	Labour		Elizabeth II
2001		Second Blair ministry	General election	Tony Blair	Labour		Elizabeth II
2005		Third Blair ministry	General election	Tony Blair	Labour		Elizabeth II
2007		Brown ministry	Leadership election	Gordon Brown	Labour		Elizabeth II
6 May	2010	Brown ministry	General election	Gordon Brown	Labour (caretaker)		Elizabeth II
11 May	2010	Cameron–Clegg coalition	Formation	David Cameron	Conservative	Liberal; Democrat	Elizabeth II
2015		Second Cameron ministry	General election	David Cameron	Conservative		Elizabeth II
2016		First May ministry	Leadership election	Theresa May	Conservative		Elizabeth II
8 Jun	2017	First May ministry	General election	Theresa May	Conservative (caretaker)		Elizabeth II
11 Jun	2017	Second May ministry	DUP agreement	Theresa May	Conservative (minority)		Elizabeth II
Jul	2019	First Johnson ministry	Leadership election	Boris Johnson	Conservative (minority)		Elizabeth II
Dec	2019	Second Johnson ministry	General election	Boris Johnson	Conservative		Elizabeth II
6 Sep	2022	Truss ministry	Leadership election	Liz Truss	Conservative		Elizabeth II
8 Sep	2022	Truss ministry	Accession	Liz Truss	Conservative		Charles III
Oct	2022	Sunak ministry	Leadership election	Rishi Sunak	Conservative		Charles III
2024		Starmer ministry	General election	Keir Starmer	Labour		Charles III
2026		Burnham ministry	Leadership election	Andy Burnham	Labour		Charles III

== See also ==
- List of English ministries, for ministries of the Kingdom of England
- List of Scottish governments, for ministries of the modern Scottish Government
- List of Northern Ireland Executives, for ministries of the Northern Ireland Executive
- List of Welsh Governments, for ministries of the modern Welsh Government
- List of British shadow cabinets, for a list of shadow cabinets
