= Walpole ministry =

Government of Great Britain

- Cabinet of Great Britain
- 1730 – 1742
- Date established: 15 May 1730
- Date dissolved: 11 February 1742

Leadership and composition
- Monarch: George II
- Prime Minister: Robert Walpole
- Member party: Whigs
- Status in legislature: Majority
- Opposition party: Tories
- Opposition leader: Viscount Bolingbroke; Sir Watkin Williams-Wynn

Formation and history
- Election: 1727 general election 1734 general election 1741 general election
- Legislature terms: 1727–1734 1734–1741 1741–1747
- Predecessor: Walpole–Townshend ministry
- Successor: Carteret ministry

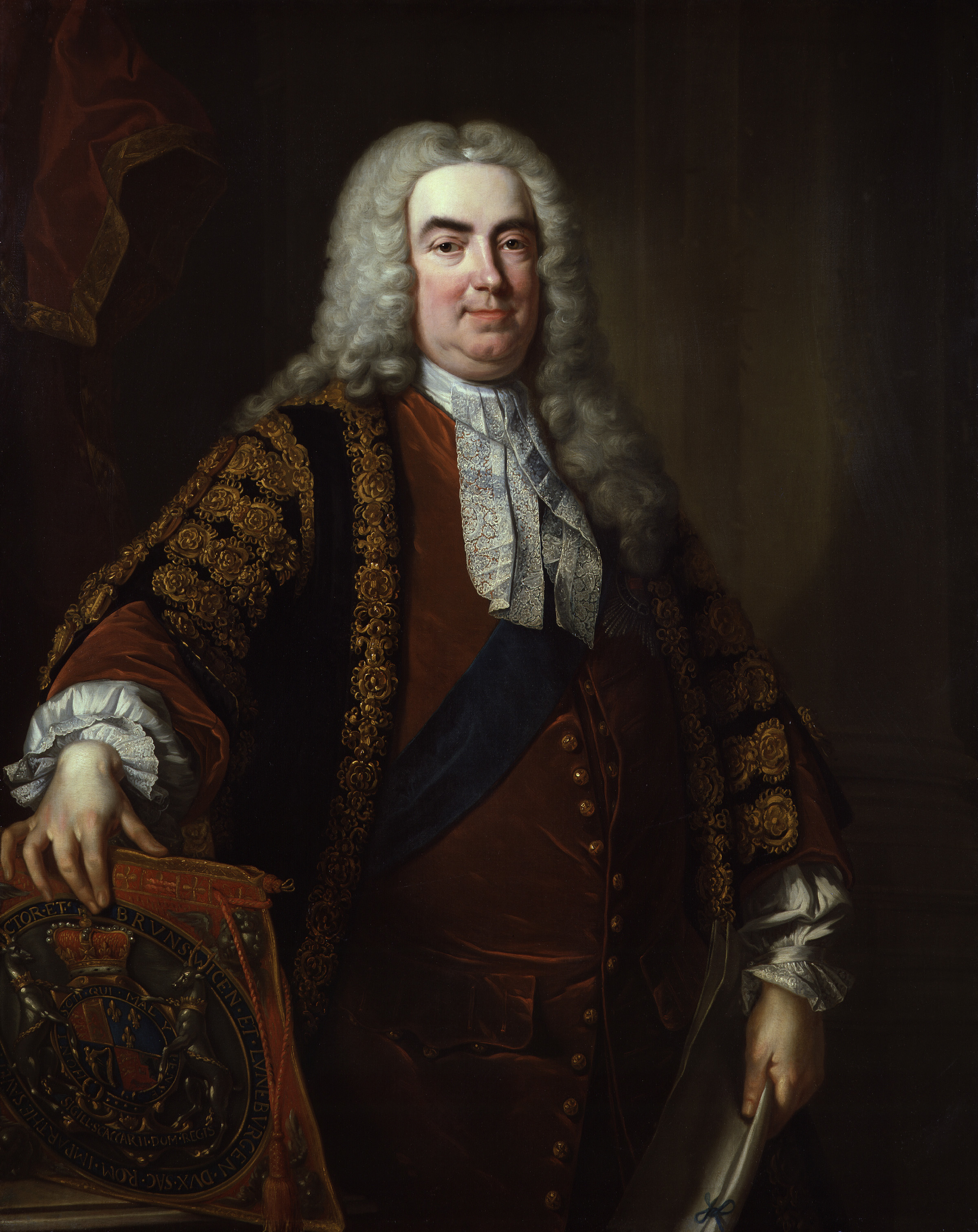
Walpole

The Walpole ministry was led by Whig Prime Minister Robert Walpole, 1st Earl of Orford, from 1730 to 1742—when Walpole left the government.

== Ministry ==
Portfolio	Minister	Took office	Left office
First Lord of the Treasury; Chancellor of the Exchequer; Leader of the House of Commons	Sir Robert Walpole (head of ministry)	Continued	1742
Secretary of State for the Southern Department	Thomas Pelham-Holles, 1st Duke of Newcastle	Continued	Continued
Secretary of State for the Northern Department	William Stanhope, 1st Baron Harrington	1730	1742
Lord Chancellor	Peter King, 1st Baron King	Continued	1733
Lord Chancellor	Charles Talbot, 1st Baron Talbot	1733	1737
Lord Chancellor	Philip Yorke, 1st Baron Hardwicke	1737	Continued
Lord President of the Council	Thomas Trevor, 1st Baron Trevor	Continued	1730
Lord President of the Council	Spencer Compton, 1st Earl of Wilmington	1730	1742
Lord Privy Seal	Spencer Compton, 1st Earl of Wilmington	1730	1730
Lord Privy Seal	In commission	1730	1731
Lord Privy Seal	William Cavendish, 3rd Duke of Devonshire	1731	1733
Lord Privy Seal	Henry Lowther, 3rd Viscount Lonsdale	1733	1735
Lord Privy Seal	Francis Godolphin, 2nd Earl of Godolphin	1735	1740
Lord Privy Seal	John Hervey, 2nd Baron Hervey	1740	1742
Secretary at War	Thomas Winnington	1741	Continued
First Lord of the Admiralty	George Byng, 1st Viscount Torrington	Continued	1733
First Lord of the Admiralty	Sir Charles Wager	1733	1742
Master-General of the Ordnance	John Campbell, 2nd Duke of Argyll	Continued	1740
Master-General of the Ordnance	John Montagu, 2nd Duke of Montagu	1740	1742
Paymaster of the Forces	Henry Pelham	1730	1742
Lord Steward	Philip Stanhope, 4th Earl of Chesterfield	1730	1733
Lord Steward	William Cavendish, 3rd Duke of Devonshire	1733	1737
Lord Steward	Lionel Sackville, 1st Duke of Dorset	1737	1742
Lord Chamberlain	Charles FitzRoy, 2nd Duke of Grafton	Continued	1742

== See also ==
- 1734 British general election
- 1741 British general election
- 1742 vote of no confidence in the Walpole ministry

== Notes ==
Preceded by Walpole–Townshend ministry	Government of Great Britain; 16 May 1730 – 11 February 1742	Succeeded by Carteret ministry
