= Harley ministry =

British government

- Cabinet of Great Britain
- 1710 – 1714
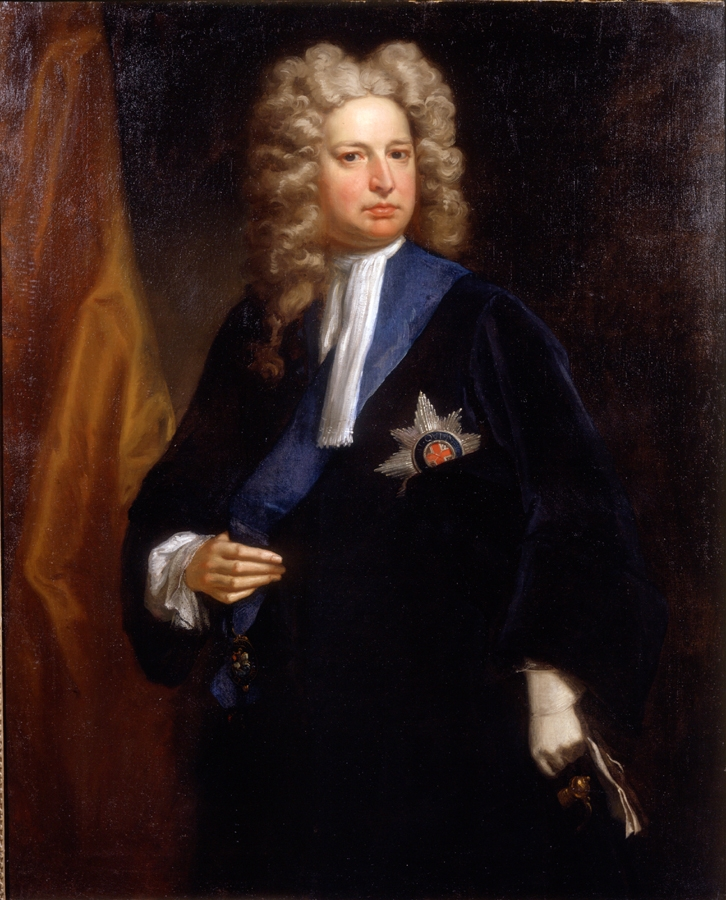
- Robert Harley headed the government and has been described as Britain's first Prime Minister.
- Date formed: 9 August 1710
- Date dissolved: 27 July 1714

People and organisations
- Monarch: Anne
- Chief Minister: Robert Harley
- Member party: Tories
- Status in legislature: Majority
- Opposition party: Whigs
- Opposition leader: Whig Junto

History
- Elections: 1710 general election 1713 general election
- Legislature terms: 1710–1713; 1713–1715
- Predecessor: Godolphin–Marlborough ministry
- Successor: Townshend ministry

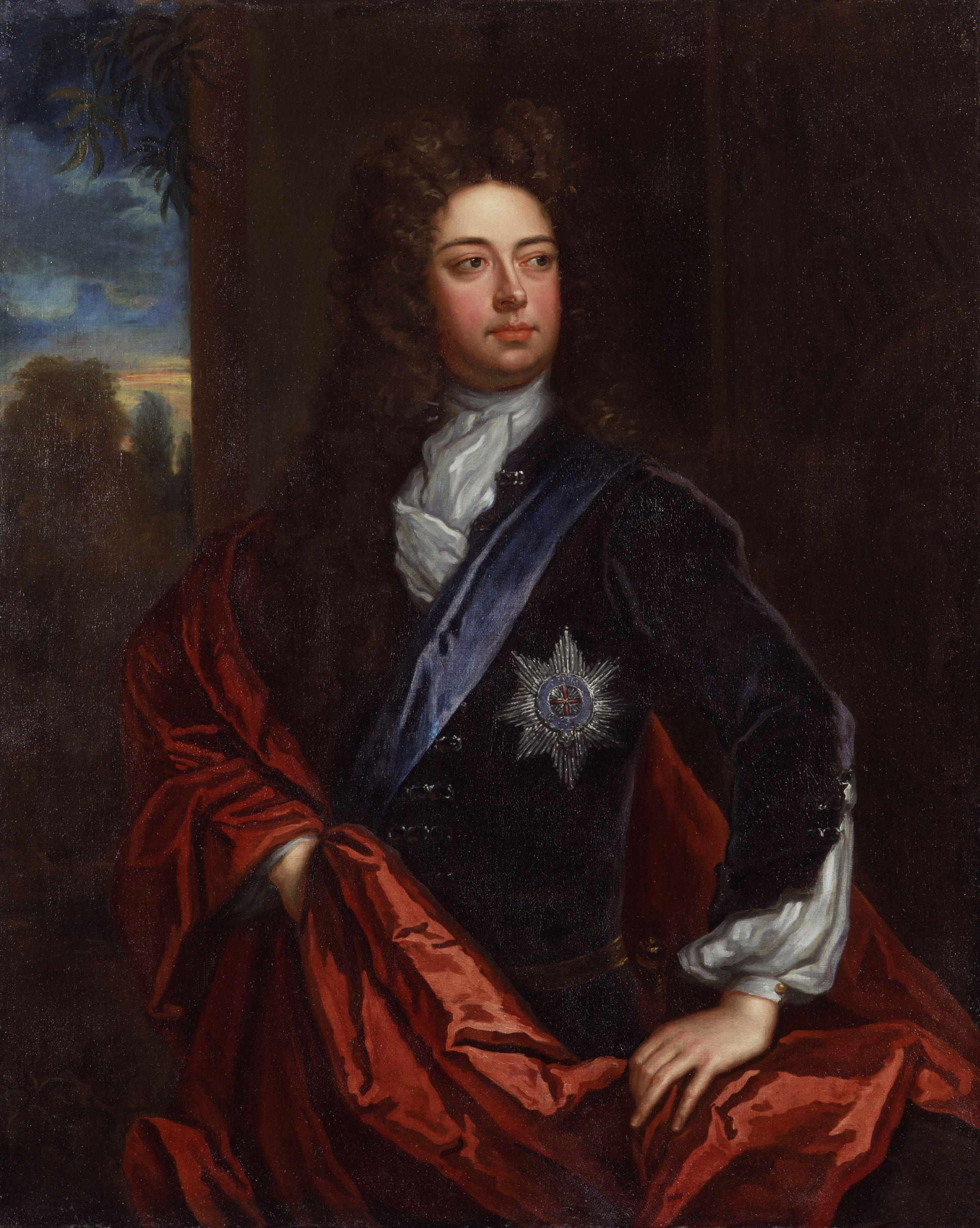
As well as commanding Allied forces as Captain General the Duke of Marlborough, served in the cabinet as Master-General of the Ordnance until his controversial dismissal.

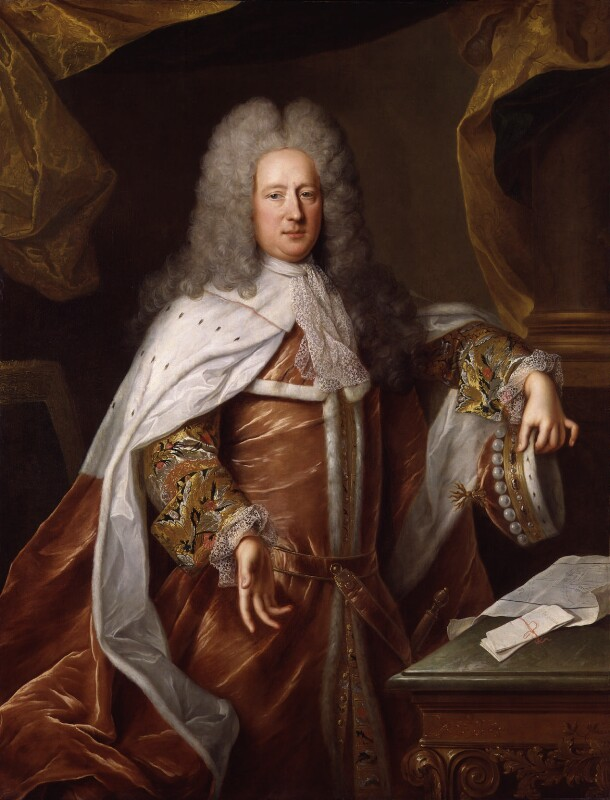
Bolingbroke served as Northern and then Southern Secretary and oversaw the negotiations that led to the Peace of Utrecht. He unsuccessfully tried to secure a Jacobite succession of Queen Anne's death.

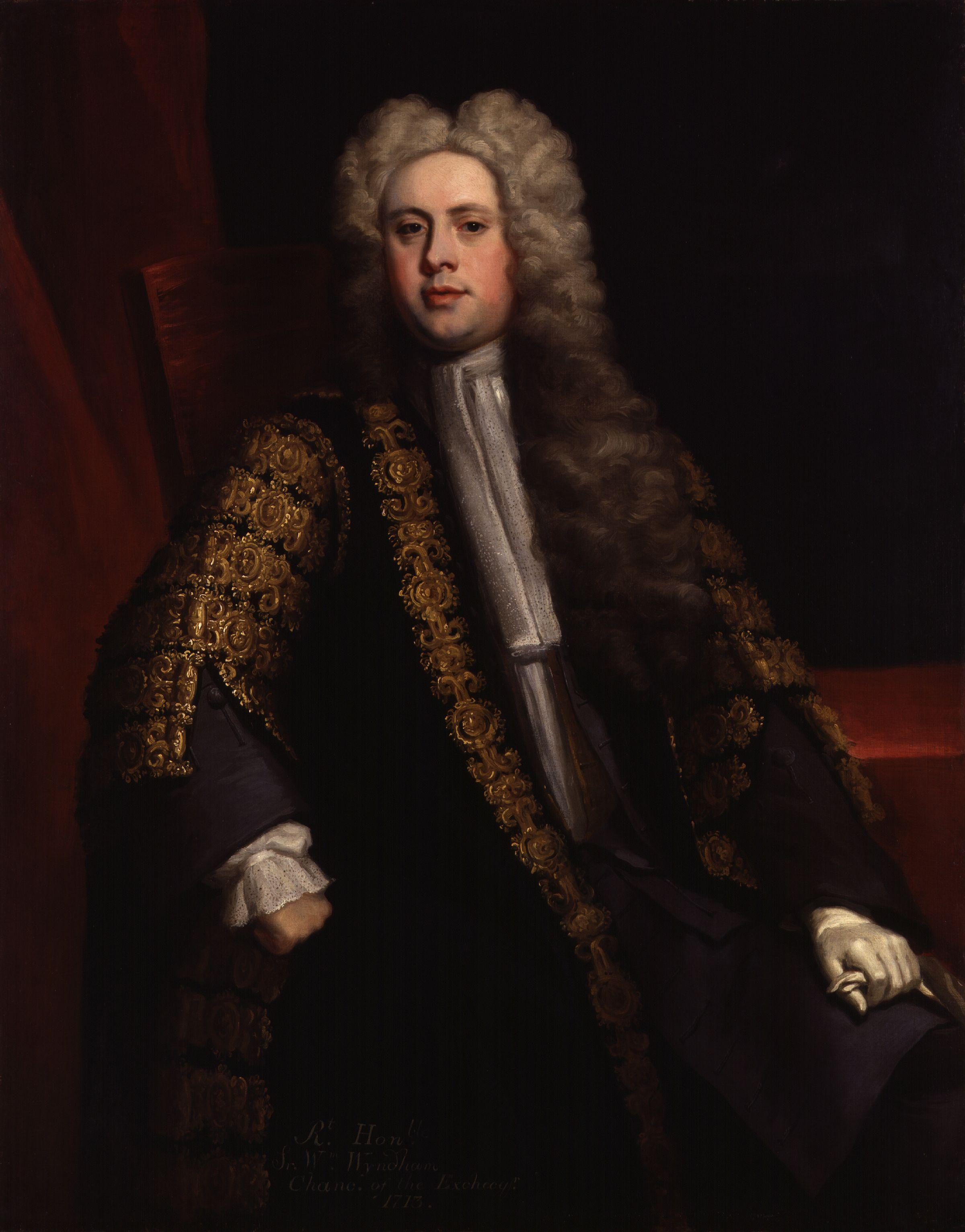
The youngest member of the government William Wyndham served briefly as Secretary at War. He then led the Tories in opposition in the House of Commons for many years after 1714.

The Harley (or Oxford–Bolingbroke) ministry was the British government that existed between 1710 and 1714 in the reign of Queen Anne. It was headed by Robert Harley (from 1711, Earl of Oxford) and composed largely of Tories. Harley was a former Whig who had changed sides, bringing down the seemingly powerful Whig Junto and their moderate Tory ally Lord Godolphin. It came during the Rage of Party when divisions between the two factions were at their height, and a "paper war" broke out between their supporters. Amongst those writers supportive of Harley's government were Jonathan Swift, Daniel Defoe, Delarivier Manley, John Arbuthnot and Alexander Pope who clashed with members of the rival Kit-Kat Club. The ministry was formed on 9 August 1710, when Harley was appointed as Chancellor of the Exchequer, and was dissolved upon Harley's dismissal as Lord High Treasurer.

== Peace treaty ==
The ministry vigorously pushed for a peace to end the War of the Spanish Succession, leading to the Treaty of Utrecht. Foreign affairs were largely conducted by Henry St John, 1st Viscount Bolingbroke. They were fiercely pressed by the Whig opposition, who used the rallying cry of No Peace Without Spain. In order to secure his peace treaty through the hostile Whig-dominated House of Lords, Harley created twelve new peerages known as Harley's Dozen in a single day to tip the balance. The ministry successfully prosecuted Robert Walpole over charges of profiteering and had him imprisoned in the Tower of London for a period.

In December 1711 the government controversially dismissed John Churchill, 1st Duke of Marlborough, a notional Tory but long supported by the Whigs, as Captain General and replaced him with the staunchly Tory Irish general James Butler, 1st Duke of Ormond. Ormond took the field as commander of the British forces in Flanders in 1712, but received "restraining orders" from Harley forbidding him from committing troops to fight the French. Ormond marched his troops away from the Allies, now commanded by Eugene of Savoy, who suffered a major defeat at the Battle of Denain without the assistance of the British. Marlborough was also dismissed from his post in the cabinet Master General of the Ordnance, a position that was handed to the Scottish Tory James Hamilton, 4th Duke of Hamilton. Hamilton was also appointed as the first British Ambassador to France following the war, but before he left for France he was killed in a notorious duel in Hyde Park with the Whig politician Charles Mohun, 4th Baron Mohun of Okehampton.

== Fall and aftermath ==
The government fell following Anne's death in 1714. The new king, George I, was not comfortable with Harley or Bolingbroke, who he believed had opposed the Hanoverian Succession and instead supported the Jacobite pretenders. They were replaced by the Townshend ministry, beginning the Whig Ascendancy, and it would be nearly fifty years before a Tory ministry gained office again in 1762. Bolingbroke was forced into exile, along with many of his followers after being accused of treason. Harley was impeached by Parliament, and remained in the Tower of London until 1717. Matthew Prior who had played an important part in the negotiating the Utrecht treaty was also imprisoned.

Several former members of the government were involved or caught up in the 1715 Jacobite rebellion. Bolingbroke in Paris served as Secretary of State for the claimant James Francis Edward Stuart, the former Scottish Secretary John Erskine, Earl of Mar led the uprising in Scotland while Sir William Wyndham, 3rd Baronet was arrested as a potential leader of the revolt in England.

== Principal ministers ==
Office	Name	Term
Lord Treasurer	John Poulett, 1st Earl Poulett (First Lord of commission)	1710–1711
Lord Treasurer	Robert Harley, 1st Earl of Oxford and Earl Mortimer	1711–1714
Lord Treasurer	Charles Talbot, 1st Duke of Shrewsbury	1714–1714
Chancellor of the Exchequer	Robert Harley	1710–1711
Chancellor of the Exchequer	Robert Benson	1711–1714
Lord President of the Council	Laurence Hyde, 1st Earl of Rochester	1710–1711
Lord President of the Council	John Sheffield, 1st Duke of Buckingham and Normanby	1711–1714
Chancellor of the Duchy of Lancaster	William Berkeley, 4th Baron Berkeley of Stratton	1710–1714
Master-General of the Ordnance	John Churchill, 1st Duke of Marlborough	1702–1712
Master-General of the Ordnance	Richard Savage, 4th Earl Rivers	1712–1712
Master-General of the Ordnance	James Hamilton, 4th Duke of Hamilton	1712–1712
Master-General of the Ordnance	Vacant	1712–1714
Secretary of State for the Southern Department	William Legge, 2nd Baron Dartmouth (Earl of Dartmouth from 1711)	1710–1713
Secretary of State for the Southern Department	Henry St John, 1st Viscount Bolingbroke	1713–1714
Secretary of State for the Northern Department	Henry St John, 1st Viscount Bolingbroke	1710–1713
Secretary of State for the Northern Department	William Bromley	1713–1714
Lord Privy Seal	John Holles, 1st Duke of Newcastle	1705–1711
Lord Privy Seal	John Robinson, Bishop of Bristol	1711–1713
Lord Privy Seal	William Legge, 1st Earl of Dartmouth	1713–1714
First Lord of Trade	Thomas Grey, 2nd Earl of Stamford	1707–1711
First Lord of Trade	Charles Finch, 4th Earl of Winchilsea	1711–1713
First Lord of Trade	Francis North, 2nd Baron Guilford	1713–1714
First Lord of the Admiralty	Edward Russell, 1st Earl of Orford	1709–1710
First Lord of the Admiralty	Sir John Leake	1710–1712
First Lord of the Admiralty	Thomas Wentworth, 1st Earl of Strafford	1712–1714
Secretary at War	George Granville	1710–1712
Secretary at War	Sir William Wyndham, 3rd Baronet	1712–1713
Secretary at War	Francis Gwyn	1713–1714
Treasurer of the Navy	Robert Walpole	1710–1711
Treasurer of the Navy	Charles Caesar	1711–1714
Paymaster-General of the Forces (Note: Cook and Stevenson also list Edward Nicholas as Paymaster-General in 1713, but his office was that of Paymaster of Pensions.)	James Brydges	1707–1713
Paymaster-General of the Forces	Thomas Moore	1713–1714
Lord Lieutenant of Ireland	James Butler, 2nd Duke of Ormonde	1710–1713
Lord Lieutenant of Ireland	Charles Talbot, 1st Duke of Shrewsbury	1713–1714
Secretary of State for Scotland	James Douglas, 2nd Duke of Queensberry	1710–1711
Secretary of State for Scotland	John Erskine, Earl of Mar	1713–1714

== See also ==
- 3rd Parliament of Great Britain
- 4th Parliament of Great Britain

Preceded by Godolphin–Marlborough ministry	Government of Great Britain; 1710–1714	Succeeded by Townshend ministry
