= Townshend ministry =

18th-century British ministry

- Cabinet of Great Britain
- 1714 – 1717
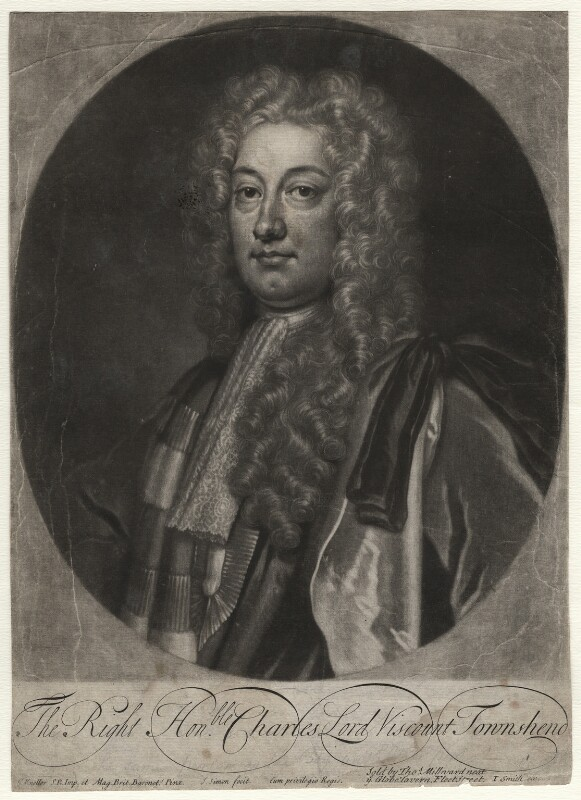
- Charles Townshend, 2nd Viscount Townshend headed the government.
- Date formed: 13 October 1714
- Date dissolved: 1717

People and organisations
- Monarch: George I
- Chief Minister: Charles Townshend, 2nd Viscount Townshend
- Member party: Whigs
- Status in legislature: Majority
- Opposition party: Tories
- Opposition leader: Viscount Bolingbroke

History
- Election: 1715 general election
- Legislature terms: 1713–1715; 1715–1722
- Predecessor: Harley ministry
- Successor: First Stanhope–Sunderland ministry

Charles Townshend, 2nd Viscount Townshend, was appointed Secretary of State for the Northern Department by George I of Great Britain in September 1714. Until 1717, he held the position of Northern Secretary and was the de facto leader of the Whig administration. However, he was later demoted to Lord Lieutenant of Ireland when he was outmanoeuvred by his rival Whigs, who formed the first Stanhope-Sunderland ministry. This led to a split within the Whig party that lasted until 1720.

== The Cabinet ==
Office	Name	Term
Northern Secretary	Charles Townshend, 2nd Viscount Townshend	1714–1716
Lord Lieutenant of Ireland	Charles Townshend, 2nd Viscount Townshend	1717
Lord Chancellor	William Cowper, 1st Earl Cowper	1714–1717
First Lord of the Treasury	Charles Montagu, 1st Earl of Halifax	1714–1715
First Lord of the Treasury	Charles Howard, 3rd Earl of Carlisle	1715
First Lord of the Treasury	Robert Walpole	1715–1717
Lord Privy Seal	Thomas Wharton, 1st Marquess of Wharton	1714–1715
Lord Privy Seal	In commission	1715
Lord Privy Seal	Charles Spencer, 3rd Earl of Sunderland	1715–1716
Lord Privy Seal	Evelyn Pierrepont, 1st Duke of Kingston-upon-Hull	1716–1717
Lord President of the Council	Daniel Finch, 2nd Earl of Nottingham	1714–1716
Lord President of the Council	William Cavendish, 2nd Duke of Devonshire	1716–1717
Southern Secretary	James Stanhope	1714–1716
Southern Secretary	Paul Methuen	1716–1717
Northern Secretary	James Stanhope	1716–1717
First Lord of the Admiralty	Edward Russell, 1st Earl of Orford	1714–1717
Chancellor of the Exchequer	Sir Richard Onslow	1714–1715
Chancellor of the Exchequer	Robert Walpole	1715–1717
Master-General of the Ordnance	John Churchill, 1st Duke of Marlborough	1714–1717
Paymaster of the Forces	Robert Walpole	1714–1715
Paymaster of the Forces	Henry Clinton, 7th Earl of Lincoln	1715–1717
Lord Lieutenant of Ireland	Charles Spencer, 3rd Earl of Sunderland	1714–1717
Lord Steward	William Cavendish, 2nd Duke of Devonshiree	1714–1716
Lord Steward	Henry Grey, 1st Duke of Kent	1716–1717
Secretary of State for Scotland	John Erskine, Earl of Mar	1714
Secretary of State for Scotland	James Graham, 1st Duke of Montrose	1714–1715
Secretary of State for Scotland	John Ker, 1st Duke of Roxburghe	1716–1717
Lord Chamberlain	Charles Talbot, 1st Duke of Shrewsbury	1714–1715
Lord Chamberlain	Charles Paulet, 2nd Duke of Bolton	1715–1717
Master of the Horse	Charles Seymour, 6th Duke of Somerset	1714–1715
Minister without Portfolio	John Somers, 1st Baron Somers	1714–1716

- Robert Walpole served as both First Lord of the Treasury and Chancellor of the Exchequer between 1715 and 1717.
- While serving as Lord Lieutenant of Ireland (1714–1717), Lord Sunderland additionally served as Lord Privy Seal between 1715 and 1716.

== See also ==
- 5th Parliament of Great Britain

Preceded by Harley ministry	Government of Great Britain; 1714–1717	Succeeded by First Stanhope–Sunderland ministry
