= First Lord of the Admiralty =

Political head of the Royal Navy (1628–1964)

- Royal Arms of HM Government
- Department of the Admiralty
- Status: Abolished
- Member of: Board of Admiralty; Cabinet
- Reports to: Prime Minister
- Nominator: Prime Minister
- Appointer: Prime Minister; Subject to formal approval by the King-in-Council
- Term length: Not fixed; typically 3–7 years
- Formation: 1628
- First holder: The 1st Earl of Portland
- Final holder: The 2nd Earl Jellicoe
- Abolished: 1964
- Superseded by: Secretary of State for Defence

First Lord of the Admiralty, formally the Office of the First Lord of the Admiralty, was the title of the political head of the Naval Service from 1628 to 1964, when the Admiralty, Air Ministry, Ministry of Defence and War Office were merged to form the Ministry of Defence. The holder was the government's senior adviser on all naval affairs, responsible for the direction and control of the Admiralty (them being the pre-eminent member of the Board of Admiralty), the Royal Navy, and the Royal Marines. It was one of the earliest known permanent government posts. The modern-day equivalent of the office is the Secretary of State for Defence.

== History ==
In 1628, during the reign of Charles I, George Villiers, 1st Duke of Buckingham, Lord High Admiral of England, was assassinated and the office was placed in commission, under the control of a Board of Commissioners.

The first such First Lord of the Admiralty was Richard Weston, 1st Earl of Portland, who was appointed in 1628. The First Lord was not always a permanent member of the board until the Admiralty Department was established as an official government department in 1709 with the First Lord as its head; it replaced the earlier Office of the Admiralty and Marine Affairs. During most of the 17th century and the early 18th century, it was not invariable for the Admiralty to be in commission, so there are gaps in the list of First Lords, and a small number of First Lords were for a time Lord High Admiral.

After the Glorious Revolution, during the reign of William and Mary, Parliament passed the Admiralty Act 1690 (2 Will. & Mar. Sess. 2. c. 2), vesting in the commissioners the powers formerly held by the Lord High Admiral of England. At this point the Admiralty became a permanent Cabinet position.

The office has been held in commission from that time onwards, except for two short periods when Prince George of Denmark (1701–1709) and the Duke of Clarence (1827–1828) served as Lord High Admiral. The Board of the Admiralty comprised a number of "Lords Commissioners" headed by a First Lord.

From the early 1800s the post was always held by a civilian (previously flag officers of the Royal Navy also held the post). In 1832 First Lord Sir James Graham instituted reforms and amalgamated the Board of Admiralty and the Navy Board. By the provisions of the Admiralty Act 1832 (2 & 3 Will. 4. c. 40), two lords in committee could legalise any action of the board.

In 1868 Prime Minister, William Gladstone appointed Hugh Childers First Lord, who would introduce a new system at the Admiralty. However these changes restricted communication between the board members who were affected by these new regulations, and the sittings of the Board were discontinued altogether. This situation described was further exacerbated by the disaster of HMS Captain in 1870, a poorly-designed new vessel for the navy.

The responsibility and powers of the First Lord of the Admiralty were laid down by an Order in Council dated 14 January 1869, and a later Order (19 March 1872) made the First Lord responsible to the Sovereign and to Parliament for all the business of the Admiralty. However, by describing the Lords of the Admiralty as the "assistants" of the First Lord, and by specifically defining their duties, this had, in fact, partially disabled the collective power of the Board.

In 1931, for the first time since 1709, the First Lord was not a member of the cabinet.

In 1946, the three posts of Secretary of State for War, First Lord of the Admiralty, and Secretary of State for Air became formally subordinated to that of Minister of Defence, which had itself been created in 1940 for the co-ordination of defence and security issues.

In 1964, the office of First Lord of the Admiralty was abolished, the last holder being George Jellicoe, 2nd Earl Jellicoe, whose father, Admiral of the Fleet John Jellicoe, 1st Earl Jellicoe, had served as First Sea Lord nearly 50 years earlier. The functions of the Lords Commissioners were then transferred to an Admiralty Board, which forms part of the tri-service Defence Council of the United Kingdom.

Principal political leaders of the English/British Armed Forces:
	Royal Navy	British Army	Royal Air Force	Co-ordination
1628	First Lord of the Admiralty (1628–1964)			
1794	First Lord of the Admiralty (1628–1964)	Secretary of State for War (1794–1801)		
1801	First Lord of the Admiralty (1628–1964)	Secretary of State for War and the Colonies (1801–1854)		
1854	First Lord of the Admiralty (1628–1964)	Secretary of State for War (1854–1964)		
1919	First Lord of the Admiralty (1628–1964)	Secretary of State for War (1854–1964)	Secretary of State for Air (1919–1964)	
1936	First Lord of the Admiralty (1628–1964)	Secretary of State for War (1854–1964)	Secretary of State for Air (1919–1964)	Minister for Co-ordination of Defence (1936–1940)
1940	First Lord of the Admiralty (1628–1964)	Secretary of State for War (1854–1964)	Secretary of State for Air (1919–1964)	Minister of Defence (1940–1964)
1964	Secretary of State for Defence (1964–present)			

== List of First Lords of the Admiralty ==
=== First Lords of the Admiralty of England (1628–1701) ===
First Lord of the Admiralty	Term of office	
Richard Weston; 1st Earl of Portland (Note: Baron Weston from 1628, created Earl of Portland in 1633.)	1628	1635
Robert Bertie; 1st Earl of Lindsey	1635	1636
William Juxon; Bishop of London (1582–1663)	1636	1638
Algernon Percy; 10th Earl of Northumberland (Note: Lord High Admiral 1638–1642.)	1642	1643
Francis Cottington; 1st Baron Cottington	1643	1646
Prince Rupert of the Rhine	1673	1679
Sir Henry Capell; MP for Tewkesbury	1679	1681
Daniel Finch; 2nd Earl of Nottingham	1681	1684
Arthur Herbert; 1st Earl of Torrington (Note: Lord High Admiral 1689.)	1689	1690
Thomas Herbert; 8th Earl of Pembroke	1690	1692
Charles Cornwallis; 3rd Baron Cornwallis	1692	1693
Anthony Cary; 5th Viscount Falkland	1693	1694
Edward Russell; 1st Earl of Orford	1694	1699
John Egerton; 3rd Earl of Bridgewater	1699	1701
Thomas Herbert; 8th Earl of Pembroke	1701	1702

=== Senior Members of the Lord High Admiral's Council (1702–1709) ===
Senior Member	Term of office	
Sir George Rooke	1702	1705
Sir David Mitchell	1705	1708
David Wemyss; 4th Earl of Wemyss	1708	1709

=== First Lords of the Admiralty of Great Britain (1709–1801) ===
First Lord of the Admiralty	Term of office		Ministry	Monarch
Edward Russell; 1st Earl of Orford	1709	1710	Godolphin–Marlborough (Tory–Whig)	Anne
Admiral of the Fleet; John Leake; MP for Rochester	1710	1712	Oxford–Bolingbroke	Anne
Thomas Wentworth; 1st Earl of Strafford	1712	1714	Oxford–Bolingbroke	Anne
Thomas Wentworth; 1st Earl of Strafford	1712	1714	Oxford–Bolingbroke	George I
Edward Russell; 1st Earl of Orford	1714	1716	Townshend	George I
James Berkeley; 3rd Earl of Berkeley	1717	1727	Stanhope–Sunderland I	George I
James Berkeley; 3rd Earl of Berkeley	1717	1727	Stanhope–Sunderland II	George I
James Berkeley; 3rd Earl of Berkeley	1717	1727	Walpole–Townshend	George I
James Berkeley; 3rd Earl of Berkeley	1717	1727	Walpole–Townshend	George II
George Byng; 1st Viscount Torrington	1727	1733	Walpole–Townshend	George II
George Byng; 1st Viscount Torrington	1727	1733	Walpole	George II
Charles Wager; MP for Westminster (Note: MP for Portsmouth until 1734; MP for Westminster from 1734.)	1733	1741	Walpole	George II
Daniel Finch; 8th Earl of Winchilsea	1741	1744	Walpole	George II
Daniel Finch; 8th Earl of Winchilsea	1741	1744	Carteret	George II
John Russell; 4th Duke of Bedford	1744	1748	Broad Bottom (I & II)	George II
John Montagu; 4th Earl of Sandwich	1748	1751	Broad Bottom (I & II)	George II
George Anson; 1st Baron Anson	1751	1756	Broad Bottom (I & II)	George II
George Anson; 1st Baron Anson	1751	1756	Newcastle I	George II
Richard Grenville-Temple; 2nd Earl Temple	1756	1757	Pitt–Devonshire	George II
Daniel Finch; 8th Earl of Winchilsea	1757	1757	1757 Caretaker	George II
George Anson; 1st Baron Anson	1757	1762	Pitt–Newcastle	George II
George Anson; 1st Baron Anson	1757	1762	Pitt–Newcastle	George III
George Montague-Dunk; 2nd Earl of Halifax	1762	1762	Bute (Tory–Whig)	George III
George Grenville; MP for Buckingham	1762	1763	Bute (Tory–Whig)	George III
John Montagu; 4th Earl of Sandwich	1763	1763	Grenville	George III
John Perceval; 2nd Earl of Egmont	1763	1766	Grenville	George III
John Perceval; 2nd Earl of Egmont	1763	1766	Rockingham I	George III
John Perceval; 2nd Earl of Egmont	1763	1766	Chatham (Whig–Tory)	George III
Charles Saunders; MP for Hedon	1766	1766	Chatham (Whig–Tory)	George III
Edward Hawke; MP for Portsmouth	1766	1771	Chatham (Whig–Tory)	George III
Edward Hawke; MP for Portsmouth	1766	1771	Grafton	George III
Edward Hawke; MP for Portsmouth	1766	1771	North	George III
John Montagu; 4th Earl of Sandwich	1771	1782	North	George III
Augustus Keppel; 1st Viscount Keppel	1782	1783	Rockingham II	George III
Augustus Keppel; 1st Viscount Keppel	1782	1783	Shelburne (Whig–Tory)	George III
Richard Howe; 5th Viscount Howe	1783	1783	Shelburne (Whig–Tory)	George III
Augustus Keppel; 1st Viscount Keppel	1783	1783	Fox–North	George III
Richard Howe; 5th Viscount Howe	1783	1788	Pitt I	George III
John Pitt; 2nd Earl of Chatham	1788	1794	Pitt I	George III
George Spencer; 2nd Earl Spencer	1794	1801	Pitt I	George III

=== First Lords of the Admiralty of the United Kingdom (1801–1964) ===
First Lord of the Admiralty	Term of office		Party	Ministry	Monarch (Reign)
John Jervis; 1st Earl of St Vincent	1801	1804	Whig	Pitt I	George III
John Jervis; 1st Earl of St Vincent	1801	1804	Whig	Addington	George III
Henry Dundas; 1st Viscount Melville	1804	1805	Tory	Pitt II	George III
Charles Middleton; 1st Baron Barham	1805	1806	Tory	Pitt II	George III
Charles Grey; Viscount Howick; MP for Northumberland	1806	1806	Whig	All the Talents (Whig–Tory)	George III
Thomas Grenville; MP for Buckingham	1806	1807	Whig	All the Talents (Whig–Tory)	George III
Henry Phipps; 3rd Baron Mulgrave	1807	1810	Tory	Portland II	George III
Henry Phipps; 3rd Baron Mulgrave	1807	1810	Tory	Perceval	George III
Charles Philip Yorke; MP for St Germans	1810	1812	Tory	Perceval	George III
Robert Dundas; 2nd Viscount Melville	1812	1827	Tory	Liverpool	George III
Robert Dundas; 2nd Viscount Melville	1812	1827	Tory	Liverpool	George IV
Prince William Henry; Duke of Clarence; Lord High Admiral (Note: As Lord High Admiral .)	1827	1828	—	Canning (Canningite–Whig)	George IV
Prince William Henry; Duke of Clarence; Lord High Admiral	1827	1828	—	Goderich	George IV
Robert Dundas; 2nd Viscount Melville	1828	1830	Tory	Wellington–Peel	George IV
Robert Dundas; 2nd Viscount Melville	1828	1830	Tory	Wellington–Peel	William IV
James Graham; MP for East Cumberland (Note: MP for Cumberland until 1832; MP for East Cumberland from 1832)	1830	1834	Whig	Grey	William IV
George Eden; 2nd Baron Auckland	1834	1834	Whig	Grey	William IV
George Eden; 2nd Baron Auckland	1834	1834	Whig	Melbourne I	William IV
George Eden; 2nd Baron Auckland	1834	1834	Whig	Wellington Caretaker	William IV
Thomas Robinson; 2nd Earl de Grey	1834	1835	Conservative	Peel I	William IV
George Eden; 2nd Baron Auckland	1835	1835	Whig	Melbourne II	William IV
Gilbert Elliot-Murray-Kynynmound; 2nd Earl of Minto	1835	1841	Whig	Melbourne II	William IV
Gilbert Elliot-Murray-Kynynmound; 2nd Earl of Minto	1835	1841	Whig	Melbourne II	Victoria
Thomas Hamilton; 9th Earl of Haddington	1841	1846	Conservative	Peel II	Victoria
Edward Law; 1st Earl of Ellenborough	1846	1846	Conservative	Peel II	Victoria
George Eden; 1st Earl of Auckland	1846	1849	Whig	Russell I	Victoria
Francis Baring; MP for Portsmouth	1849	1852	Whig	Russell I	Victoria
Algernon Percy; 4th Duke of Northumberland	1852	1852	Conservative	Derby–Disraeli I	Victoria
James Graham; MP for Carlisle	1852	1855	Peelite	Aberdeen (Peelite–Whig)	Victoria
James Graham; MP for Carlisle	1852	1855	Peelite	Palmerston I	Victoria
Sir Charles Wood; 3rd Baronet; MP for Halifax	1855	1858	Whig	Palmerston I	Victoria
John Pakington; MP for Droitwich	1858	1859	Conservative	Derby–Disraeli II	Victoria
His Grace; Edward Seymour; 12th Duke of Somerset	1859	1866	Liberal	Palmerston II	Victoria
His Grace; Edward Seymour; 12th Duke of Somerset	1859	1866	Liberal	Russell II	Victoria
John Pakington; MP for Droitwich	1866	1867	Conservative	Derby–Disraeli III	Victoria
Henry Lowry-Corry; MP for County Tyrone	1867	1868	Conservative	Derby–Disraeli III	Victoria
Hugh Childers; MP for Pontefract	1868	1871	Liberal	Gladstone I	Victoria
George Goschen; MP for City of London	1871	1874	Liberal	Gladstone I	Victoria
George Ward Hunt; MP for Northamptonshire North	1874	1877	Conservative	Disraeli II	Victoria
William Henry Smith; MP for Westminster	1877	1880	Conservative	Disraeli II	Victoria
Thomas Baring; 1st Earl of Northbrook	1880	1885	Liberal	Gladstone II	Victoria
Lord George Hamilton; MP for Ealing	1885	1886	Conservative	Salisbury I	Victoria
George Robinson; 1st Marquess of Ripon	1886	1886	Liberal	Gladstone III	Victoria
Lord George Hamilton; MP for Ealing	1886	1892	Conservative	Salisbury II	Victoria
John Spencer; 5th Earl Spencer	1892	1895	Liberal	Gladstone IV	Victoria
John Spencer; 5th Earl Spencer	1892	1895	Liberal	Rosebery	Victoria
George Goschen; MP for St George Hanover Square	1895	1900	Conservative	Salisbury (III & IV) (Con.–Lib.U.)	Victoria
William Palmer; 2nd Earl of Selborne	1900	1905	Liberal Unionist	Salisbury (III & IV) (Con.–Lib.U.)	Victoria
William Palmer; 2nd Earl of Selborne	1900	1905	Liberal Unionist	Salisbury (III & IV) (Con.–Lib.U.)	Edward VII
William Palmer; 2nd Earl of Selborne	1900	1905	Liberal Unionist	Balfour	Edward VII
Frederick Campbell; 3rd Earl Cawdor	1905	1905	Conservative	Balfour	Edward VII
Edward Marjoribanks; 2nd Lord Tweedmouth	1905	1908	Liberal	Campbell-Bannerman	Edward VII
Reginald McKenna; MP for North Monmouthshire	1908	1911	Liberal	Asquith (I–III)	Edward VII
Reginald McKenna; MP for North Monmouthshire	1908	1911	Liberal	Asquith (I–III)	George V
Winston Churchill; MP for Dundee	1911	1915	Liberal	Asquith (I–III)	George V
Arthur Balfour; MP for City of London	1915	1916	Conservative	Asquith Coalition (Lib.–Con.–et al.)	George V
Edward Carson; MP for Dublin University	1916	1917	Conservative	Lloyd George (I & II)	George V
Eric Geddes; MP for Cambridge	1917	1919	Conservative	Lloyd George (I & II)	George V
Walter Long; MP for Westminster St George's	1919	1921	Conservative	Lloyd George (I & II)	George V
Arthur Lee; 1st Baron Lee of Fareham	1921	1922	Conservative	Lloyd George (I & II)	George V
Leo Amery; MP for Birmingham Sparkbrook	1922	1924	Conservative	Law	George V
Leo Amery; MP for Birmingham Sparkbrook	1922	1924	Conservative	Baldwin I	George V
Frederic Thesiger; 1st Viscount Chelmsford	1924	1924	Independent	MacDonald I	George V
William Clive Bridgeman (Note: MP for Oswestry)	1924	1929	Conservative	Baldwin II	George V
A. V. Alexander; MP for Sheffield Hillsborough	1929	1931	Labour (Co-op)	MacDonald II	George V
Austen Chamberlain; MP for Birmingham West	1931	1931	Conservative	National I (N.Lab.–Con.–et al.)	George V
Bolton Eyres-Monsell; 1st Viscount Monsell (Note: MP for Evesham until 1935; thereafter created Viscount Monsell.)	1931	1936	Conservative	National II	George V
Bolton Eyres-Monsell; 1st Viscount Monsell	1931	1936	Conservative	National III (Con.–N.Lab.–et al.)	George V
Bolton Eyres-Monsell; 1st Viscount Monsell	1931	1936	Conservative	National III (Con.–N.Lab.–et al.)	Edward VIII
Samuel Hoare; MP for Chelsea	1936	1937	Conservative	National III (Con.–N.Lab.–et al.)	Edward VIII
Samuel Hoare; MP for Chelsea	1936	1937	Conservative	National III (Con.–N.Lab.–et al.)	George VI
Duff Cooper; MP for Westminster St George's	1937	1938	Conservative	National IV	George VI
James Stanhope; 7th Earl Stanhope	1938	1939	Conservative	National IV	George VI
Winston Churchill; MP for Epping	1939	1940	Conservative	Chamberlain War	George VI
A. V. Alexander; MP for Sheffield Hillsborough	1940	1945	Labour (Co-op)	Churchill War (All parties)	George VI
Brendan Bracken; MP for Paddington North	1945	1945	Conservative	Churchill Caretaker (Con.–N.Lib.)	George VI
A. V. Alexander; MP for Sheffield Hillsborough	1945	1946	Labour (Co-op)	Attlee (I & II)	George VI
George Hall; 1st Viscount Hall	1946	1951	Labour	Attlee (I & II)	George VI
Frank Pakenham; 1st Baron Pakenham	1951	1951	Labour	Attlee (I & II)	George VI
James Thomas; 1st Viscount Cilcennin (Note: MP for Hereford until 1955; thereafter created Viscount Cilcennin.)	1951	1956	Conservative	Churchill III	George VI
James Thomas; 1st Viscount Cilcennin	1951	1956	Conservative	Churchill III	Elizabeth II
James Thomas; 1st Viscount Cilcennin	1951	1956	Conservative	Eden	Elizabeth II
Quintin Hogg; 2nd Viscount Hailsham	1956	1957	Conservative	Eden	Elizabeth II
George Douglas-Hamilton; 10th Earl of Selkirk	1957	1959	Conservative	Macmillan (I & II)	Elizabeth II
Peter Carington; 6th Baron Carrington	1959	1963	Conservative	Macmillan (I & II)	Elizabeth II
George Jellicoe; 2nd Earl Jellicoe	1963	1964	Conservative	Douglas-Home	Elizabeth II

From 1 April 1964, Queen Elizabeth II assumed the title of Lord High Admiral. Ministerial responsibility for the Royal Navy was transferred to the newly created Secretary of State for Defence.

== Boards, departments and offices under the First Lord ==
- Admiralty and Marine Affairs Office (1628–1709)
- Admiralty Department (1709–1964)
- Board of Admiralty (1628–1964)
- Navy Board (1628–1832)
- Sick and Hurt Board (1653–1806)
- Transport Board (1690–1724, 1794–1817)
- Victualling Board (1683–1832)
- Office of the Civil Lord of the Admiralty
- Office of the Senior Naval Lord (1689–1771)
- Office of the First Naval Lord (1771–1904)
- Office of the First Sea Lord (1904–1917)
- Office of the First Sea Lord and Chief of Naval Staff (1917–1964)
- Office of the Private Secretary to the First Lord of the Admiralty (1800–1910)
- Office of the Naval Secretary (1910–1964)
- Office of the Secretary to the Admiralty (1660–1763)
- Office of the First Secretary to the Admiralty (1763–1871)
- Office of the Parliamentary Secretary to the Admiralty (1871–1886)
- Office of the Parliamentary and Financial Secretary to the Admiralty (1886–1959)
- Office of the Permanent Secretary to the Admiralty (1882–1964)

== Fictional First Lords ==
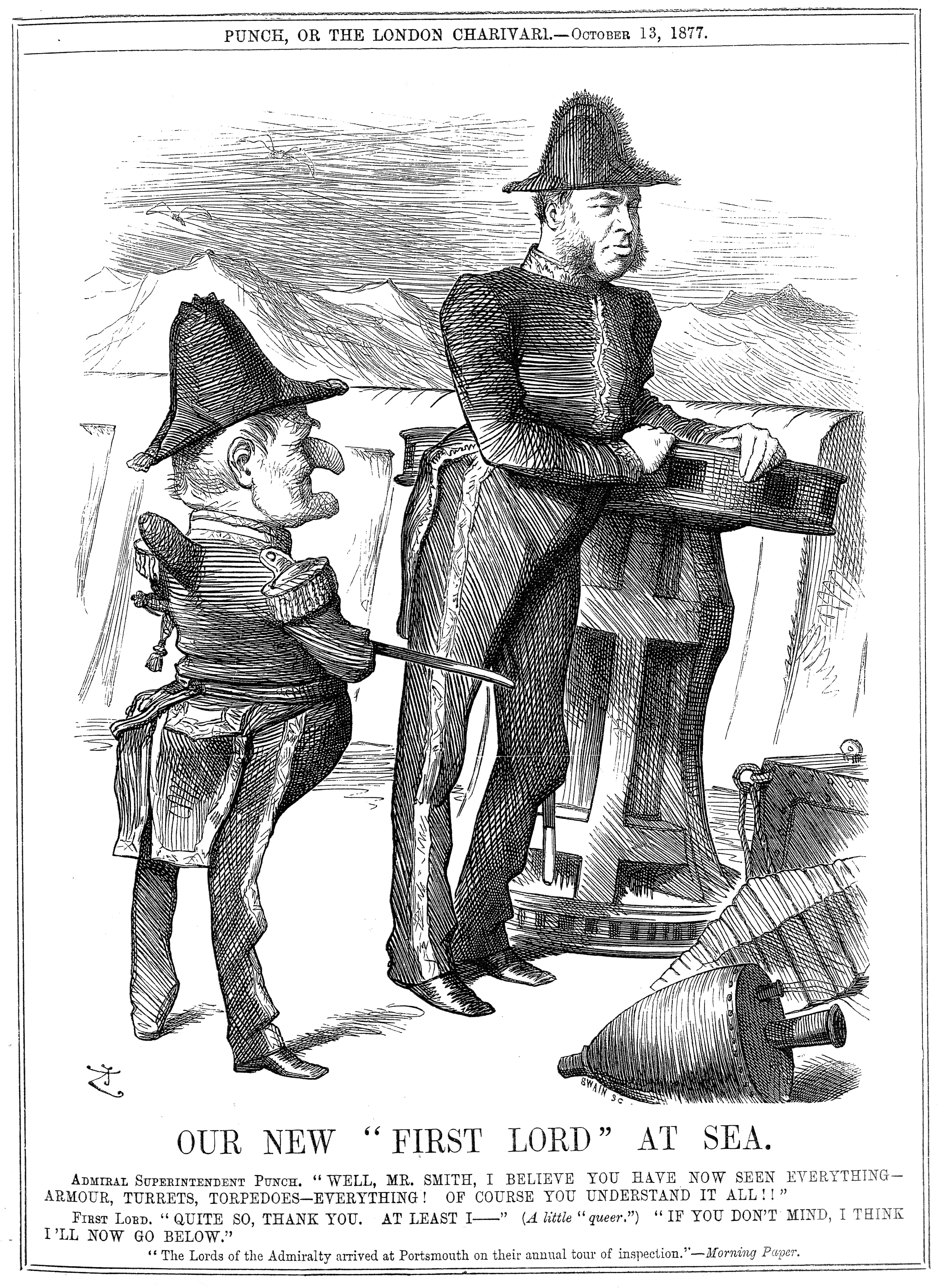
W. H. Smith portrayed in a Punch cartoon from 13 October 1877 when First Lord, saying: "I think I'll now go below." In H.M.S. Pinafore, Sir Joseph Porter similarly sings: "When the breezes blow / I generally go below".

The "Radical" First Lord, and a major character, in Gilbert and Sullivan's comic opera H.M.S. Pinafore (1878), is Sir Joseph Porter. W. S. Gilbert wrote to Arthur Sullivan he did not intend to portray the real-life then First Lord, the bookseller and newsagent W. H. Smith, a Conservative, although some of the public, including Prime Minister Benjamin Disraeli (who later referred to Smith as "Pinafore Smith"), identified Porter with him. The counterparts shared a known lack of naval background. It has been suggested the character was drawn on Smith's actual "Radical" predecessor of 1868–71, Hugh Childers.

== Sources ==
- Bell, Christopher M. "Sir John Fisher's Naval Revolution Reconsidered: Winston Churchill at the Admiralty, 1911–1914." War in History 18.3 (2011): 333–356. online
- Hamilton, C. I. (2011). The Making of the Modern Admiralty: British Naval Policy-Making, 1805–1927. Cambridge: Cambridge University Press. ISBN 9780521765183.
- Rodger, N. A. M., The Admiralty (Lavenham, 1979)
- Sainty, J. C. Admiralty Officials, 1660–1870 (London, 1975)
