= Walpole–Townshend ministry =

Government of Great Britain

- Cabinet of Great Britain
- 1721 – 1730
- Date formed: February 1721
- Date dissolved: 15 May 1730

People and organisations
- Monarch: George I George II
- Prime Minister: Robert Walpole
- Deputy Prime Minister: Charles Townshend (de facto)
- Member party: Whigs
- Status in legislature: Majority
- Opposition party: Tories
- Opposition leader: Viscount Bolingbroke

History
- Elections: 1722 general election 1727 general election
- Legislature terms: 1722–1727; 1727–1730
- Predecessor: Stanhope–Sunderland ministry II
- Successor: Walpole ministry

Walpole–Townshend ministry
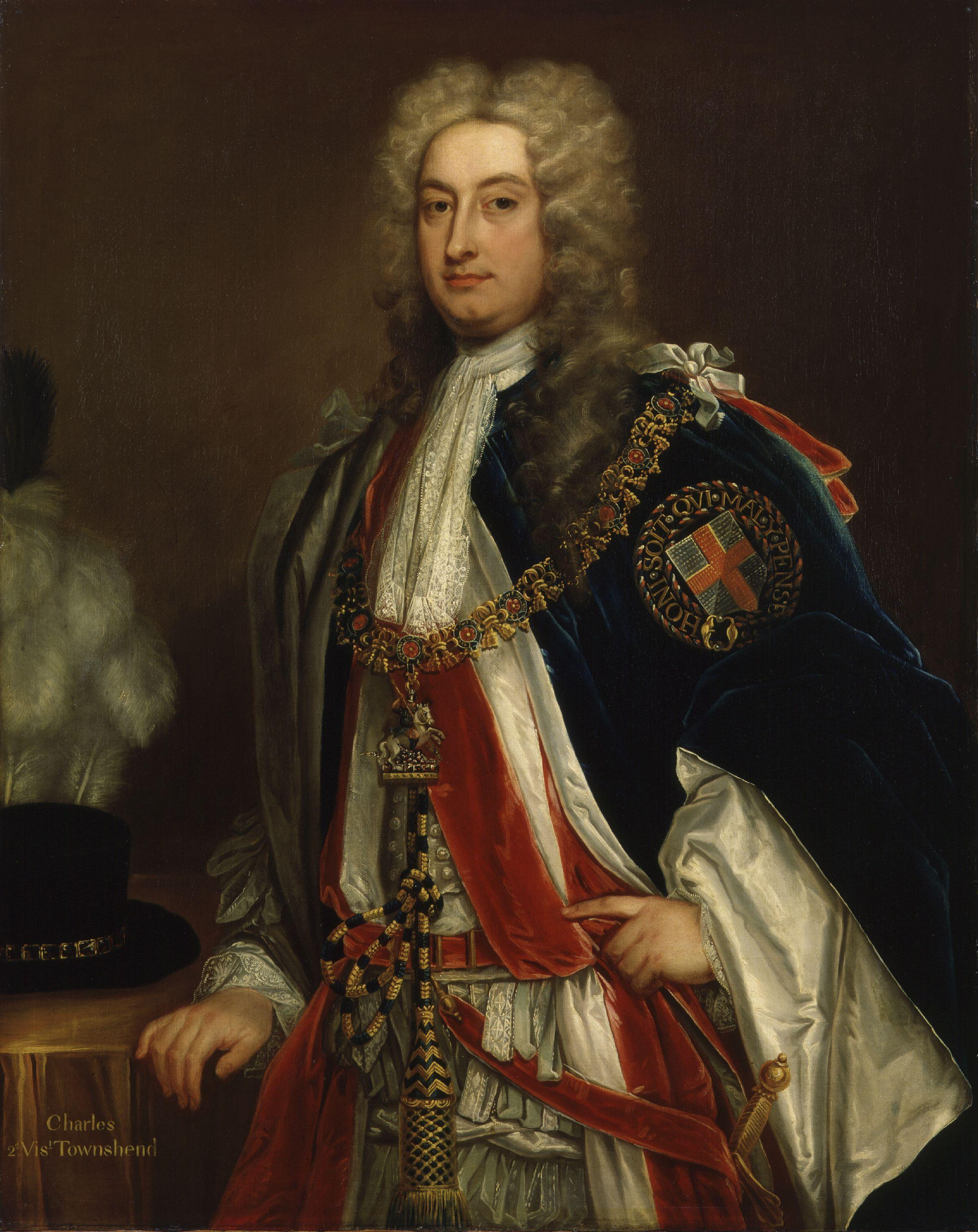
Walpole (top) and Townshend (bott.)

The government of Great Britain was under the joint leadership of Prime Minister Robert Walpole (in the House of Commons) and Charles Townshend, 2nd Viscount Townshend (in the House of Lords), from 1721 until Townshend departed from the government in 1730.

== Cabinet ==
Portfolio	Minister	Took office	Left office
First Lord of the Treasury; Chancellor of the Exchequer; Leader of the House of Commons	Robert Walpole (head of ministry)	1721	Continued to next
Secretary of State for the Northern Department	Charles Townshend, 2nd Viscount Townshend (head of ministry)	1721	1730
Secretary of State for the Southern Department	John Carteret, Lord Carteret	Continued from previous	1724
Secretary of State for the Southern Department	Thomas Pelham-Holles, Duke of Newcastle	1724	Continued to next
Lord Chancellor	Thomas Parker, 1st Earl of Macclesfield	Continued from previous	1725
Lord Chancellor	Peter King, 1st Baron King	1725	Continued to next
Lord Privy Seal	Evelyn Pierrepont, 1st Duke of Kingston-upon-Hull	Continued from previous	1726
Lord Privy Seal	Thomas Trevor, 1st Baron Trevor	1726	Continued to next
Lord President of the Council	Charles Townshend, 2nd Viscount Townshend (head of ministry)	Continued from previous	1721
Lord President of the Council	Henry Boyle, 1st Baron Carleton	1721	1725
Lord President of the Council	William Cavendish, 2nd Duke of Devonshire	1725	1730
Lord President of the Council	Thomas Trevor, 1st Baron Trevor	1730	Continued to next
First Lord of the Admiralty	James Berkeley, 3rd Earl of Berkeley	Continued from previous	1727
First Lord of the Admiralty	George Byng, 1st Viscount Torrington	1727	Continued to next
Master-General of the Ordnance	John Churchill, 1st Duke of Marlborough	Continued from previous	1722
Master-General of the Ordnance	William Cadogan, 1st Earl Cadogan	1722	1725
Master-General of the Ordnance	John Campbell, 2nd Duke of Argyll	1725	Continued to next
Paymaster of the Forces	Charles Cornwallis, 4th Baron Cornwallis	1721	1722
Paymaster of the Forces	Spencer Compton, 1st Baron Wilmington	1722	1730
Lord Steward	John Campbell, 2nd Duke of Argyll	Continued from previous	1725
Lord Steward	Lionel Sackville, 1st Duke of Dorset	1725	1730
Lord Chamberlain	Thomas Pelham-Holles, 1st Duke of Newcastle	Continued from previous	1724
Lord Chamberlain	Charles FitzRoy, 2nd Duke of Grafton	1724	Continued to next
Master of the Horse	Richard Lumley, 2nd Earl of Scarbrough	1727	Continued to next
Secretary of State for Scotland	John Ker, 1st Duke of Roxburghe	Continued from previous	1726

== See also ==
- 1722 British general election
- 1727 British general election
- 5th Parliament of Great Britain
- Whigs (British political party)

== Notes ==
Preceded by Second Stanhope–Sunderland ministry	Government of Great Britain; 3 April 1721 – 16 May 1730	Succeeded by Walpole ministry
