= First Stanhope–Sunderland ministry =

- Cabinet of Great Britain
- 1717 – 1718
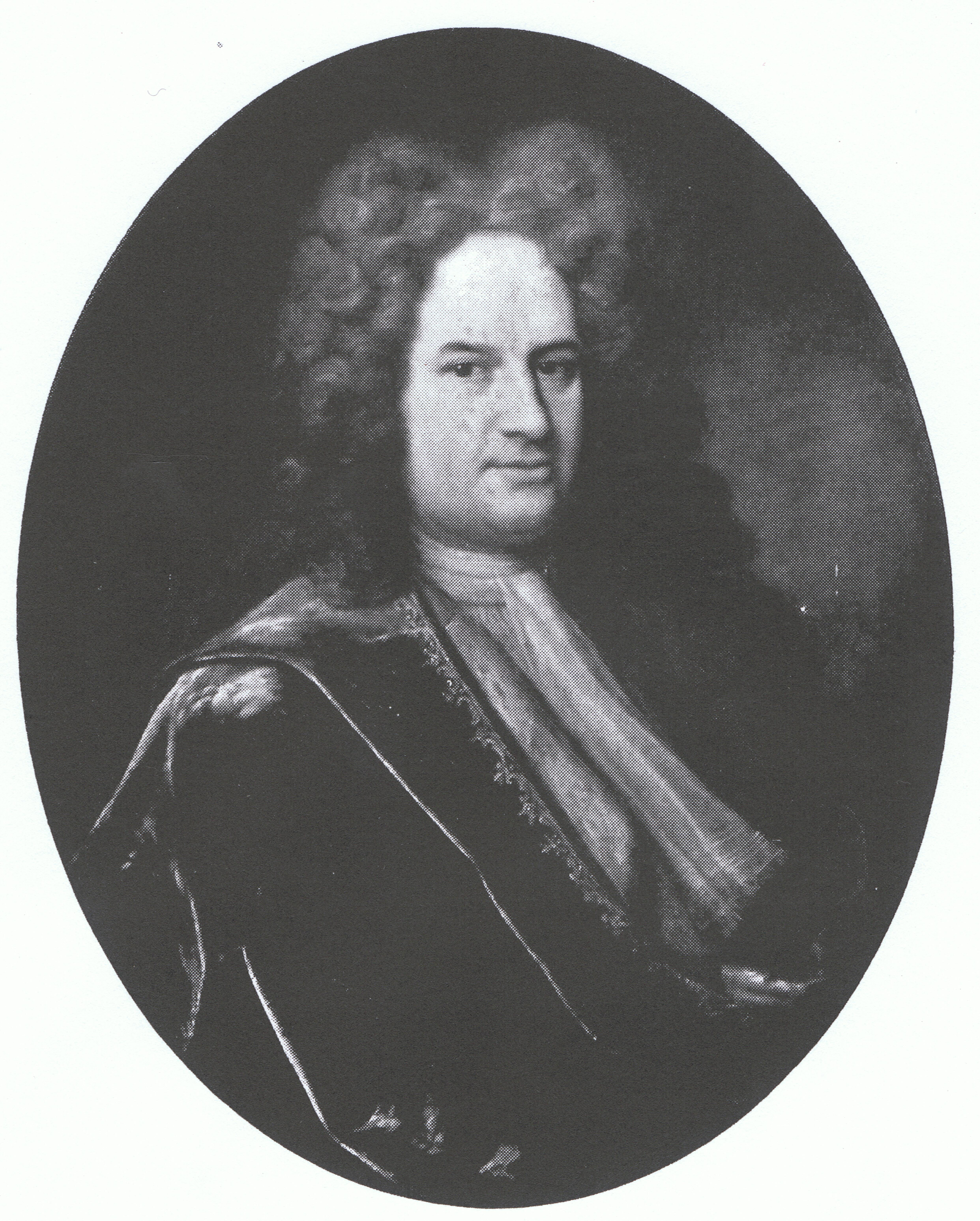
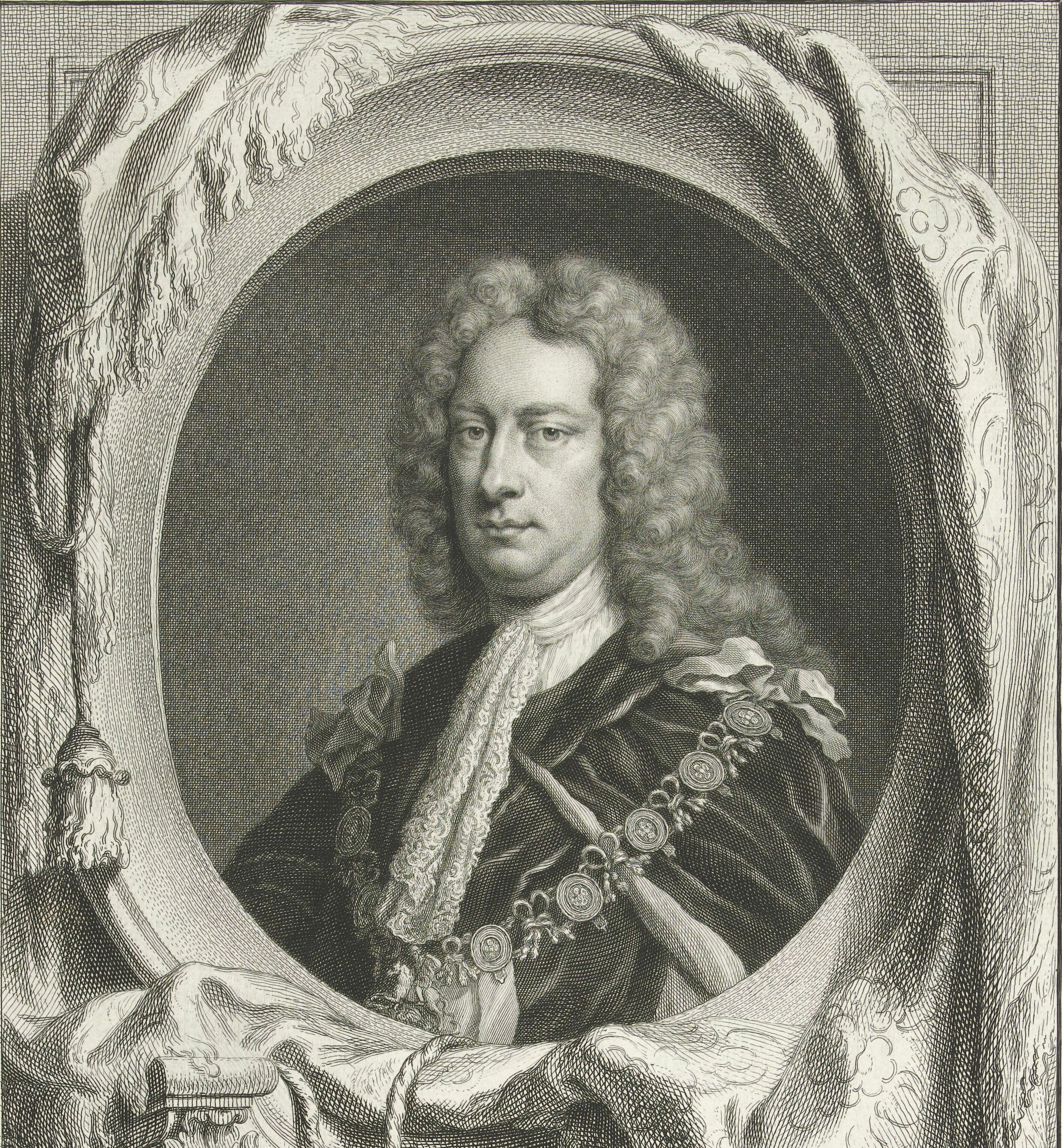
- Stanhope (left) and Sunderland (right)
- Date established: 1717
- Date dissolved: 1718

Leadership and composition
- Monarch: George I
- Chief Ministers: Charles Spencer, 3rd Earl of Sunderland; James Stanhope, 1st Earl Stanhope
- Member party: Whigs
- Status in legislature: Majority
- Opposition party: Tories
- Opposition leader: Viscount Bolingbroke

Formation and history
- Election: 1715 general election
- Legislature terms: 1715–1722
- Predecessor: Townshend ministry
- Successor: Second Stanhope–Sunderland ministry

Robert Walpole and Charles Townshend, 2nd Viscount Townshend were removed from their positions in the government (the latter having already previously been demoted to Lord Lieutenant of Ireland), and were replaced by James Stanhope, 1st Viscount Stanhope of Mahon and Charles Spencer, 3rd Earl of Sunderland, who cooperatively led the first Stanhope–Sunderland ministry. The two Whigs remained in power from 1717 to 1721, although in 1718, Lord Stanhope exchanged positions with Lord Sunderland to form the second Stanhope–Sunderland ministry. Upon Lord Stanhope's death, Robert Walpole, widely considered the first true Prime Minister of Great Britain, returned to head the government.

== The Ministry ==
Office	Holder	Tenure
First Lord of the Treasury; Chancellor of the Exchequer	James Stanhope, 1st Viscount Stanhope of Mahon	1717–1718
Secretary of State for the Northern Department	Charles Spencer, 3rd Earl of Sunderland	1717–1718
Secretary of State for the Southern Department	Joseph Addison	1717–1718
Lord Chancellor	William Cowper, 1st Baron Cowper	1717–1718
Lord President of the Council	William Cavendish, 2nd Duke of Devonshire	1717–1718
Lord Privy Seal	Evelyn Pierrepont, 1st Duke of Kingston-upon-Hull	1717–1718
First Lord of the Admiralty	James Berkeley, 3rd Earl of Berkeley	1717–1718
Master-General of the Ordnance	John Churchill, 1st Duke of Marlborough	1717–1718
Paymaster of the Forces	Henry Clinton, 7th Earl of Lincoln	1717–1718
Lord Lieutenant of Ireland	Charles Paulet, 2nd Duke of Bolton	1717–1718
Lord Steward	Henry Grey, 1st Duke of Kent	1717–1718
Lord Chamberlain	Thomas Pelham-Holles, 1st Duke of Newcastle	1717–1718
Secretary of State for Scotland	John Ker, 1st Duke of Roxburghe	1717–1718

Preceded by Townshend ministry	Government of Great Britain; 1717–1718	Succeeded by Second Stanhope–Sunderland ministry
