= Overlord system =

The Overlord system was a popular name given to a short lived structure of government in British Prime Minister Winston Churchill's 1951 administration.

Ministers with no departmental responsibilities were appointed to co-ordinate action by groups of Cabinet ministers. Lord Leathers was given the title of Minister for Coordination of Transport, Fuel and Power. Lord Woolton was also given wide ranging responsibilities over agriculture and food.

Viscount Waverley was offered a role overseeing the Treasury, Board of Trade and the Ministry of Supply, but Waverley rejected this offer, thinking the position "wrong in principle".

Churchill himself returned to his wartime practice of acting as Defence Secretary in addition to holding the office of Prime Minister.

Churchill called the system "a valuable aid to efficiency" but it was criticised by the Labour opposition.

The system was ended in Churchill's Cabinet reshuffle of September 1953.
