= Second Stanhope–Sunderland ministry =

- Cabinet of Great Britain
- 1718 – 1721
- Date formed: 1718
- Date dissolved: February 1721

People and organisations
- Monarch: George I
- Chief Ministers: Charles Spencer, 3rd Earl of Sunderland; James Stanhope, 1st Earl Stanhope
- Member party: Whigs
- Status in legislature: Majority
- Opposition party: Tories
- Opposition leader: Viscount Bolingbroke

History
- Election: 1715 general election
- Legislature terms: 1715–1722
- Predecessor: Stanhope–Sunderland ministry I
- Successor: Walpole–Townshend ministry

The second Stanhope–Sunderland ministry (1718–1721) was a continuation of the British Whig government headed by Charles Spencer, 3rd Earl of Sunderland and James Stanhope, 1st Earl Stanhope. These had taken power in 1717 to form the first Stanhope–Sunderland ministry, and in 1718 they interchanged positions, with Sunderland becoming First Lord of the Treasury. The ministry terminated upon Stanhope's death in February 1721.

== Ministry ==
Office	Name	Term
First Lord of the Treasury	Charles Spencer, 3rd Earl of Sunderland (head of ministry)	1718–1721
Northern Secretary	James Stanhope, 1st Earl Stanhope (head of ministry)	1718–1721
Lord Chancellor	Thomas Parker, 1st Earl of Macclesfield	1718–1721
Lord President of the Council	Charles Spencer, 3rd Earl of Sunderland	1718–1719
Lord President of the Council	Evelyn Pierrepont, 1st Duke of Kingston-upon-Hull	1719–1720
Lord President of the Council	Charles Townshend, 2nd Viscount Townshend	1720–1721
Lord Privy Seal	Evelyn Pierrepont, 1st Duke of Kingston-upon-Hull	1718–1719
Lord Privy Seal	Henry Grey, 1st Duke of Kent	1719–1720
Lord Privy Seal	Evelyn Pierrepont, 1st Duke of Kingston-upon-Hull	1720–1721
Southern Secretary	James Craggs the Younger	1718–1721
Southern Secretary	John Carteret, Baron Carteret	1721
First Lord of the Admiralty	James Berkeley, 3rd Earl of Berkeley	1718–1721
Chancellor of the Exchequer	John Aislabie	1718–1721
Master-General of the Ordnance	John Churchill, 1st Duke of Marlborough	1718–1721
Paymaster of the Forces	Henry Clinton, 7th Earl of Lincoln	1718–1720
Paymaster of the Forces	Robert Walpole	1720–1721
Lord Lieutenant of Ireland	Charles Paulet, 2nd Duke of Bolton	1718–1720
Lord Lieutenant of Ireland	Charles Fitzroy, 2nd Duke of Grafton	1720–1721
Lord Steward	John Campbell, 2nd Duke of Argyll	1718–1721
Lord Chamberlain	Thomas Pelham-Holles, 1st Duke of Newcastle	1718–1721
Secretary of State for Scotland	John Ker, 1st Duke of Roxburghe	1718–1721

Preceded by First Stanhope–Sunderland ministry	Government of Great Britain; 1718–1721	Succeeded by Walpole–Townshend ministry
