= Castlereagh–Canning duel =

1809 pistol duel in England

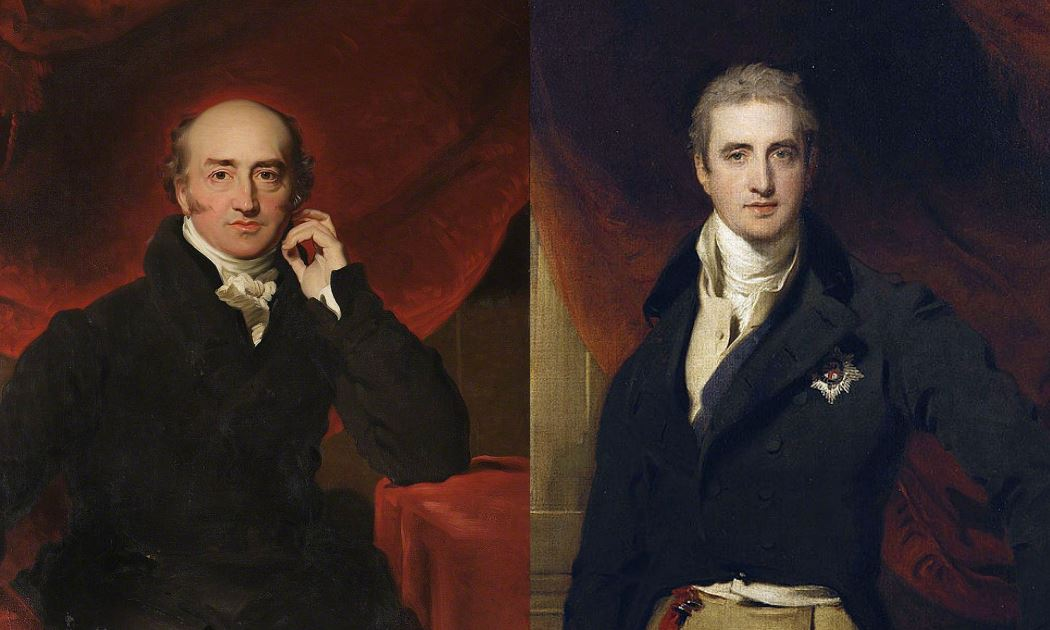
Later portraits of Canning and Castlereagh

The Castlereagh–Canning duel was a pistol duel between the British Minister of War Viscount Castlereagh and Foreign Secretary George Canning, which took place on 21 September 1809 at Putney Heath. The reasons for the duel were the rivalry between the two politicians and numerous disagreements between them over the conduct of the war against Napoleonic France in 1808 and 1809. These differing opinions ultimately led to Canning's demand for a new appointment to the War Office in the spring of 1809, accompanied by a threat of his own resignation. The incumbent Prime Minister, the Duke of Portland, was reluctant to lose either Canning or Castlereagh and delayed a decision for an extended period. Instead, the matter was discussed with various members of the Cabinet and also King George III without the knowledge of Castlereagh, who only became aware of the discussions in the late summer of 1809 and responded by challenging Canning to a duel a few days later. The duel, in which Canning was wounded in the leg by Castlereagh, resulted in the final collapse of the Portland government and the advancement of Spencer Perceval as the new Prime Minister. Castlereagh and Canning, meanwhile, spent several years on the backbenches, absent from any government responsibility.

== The origins and rise of Castlereagh and Canning ==
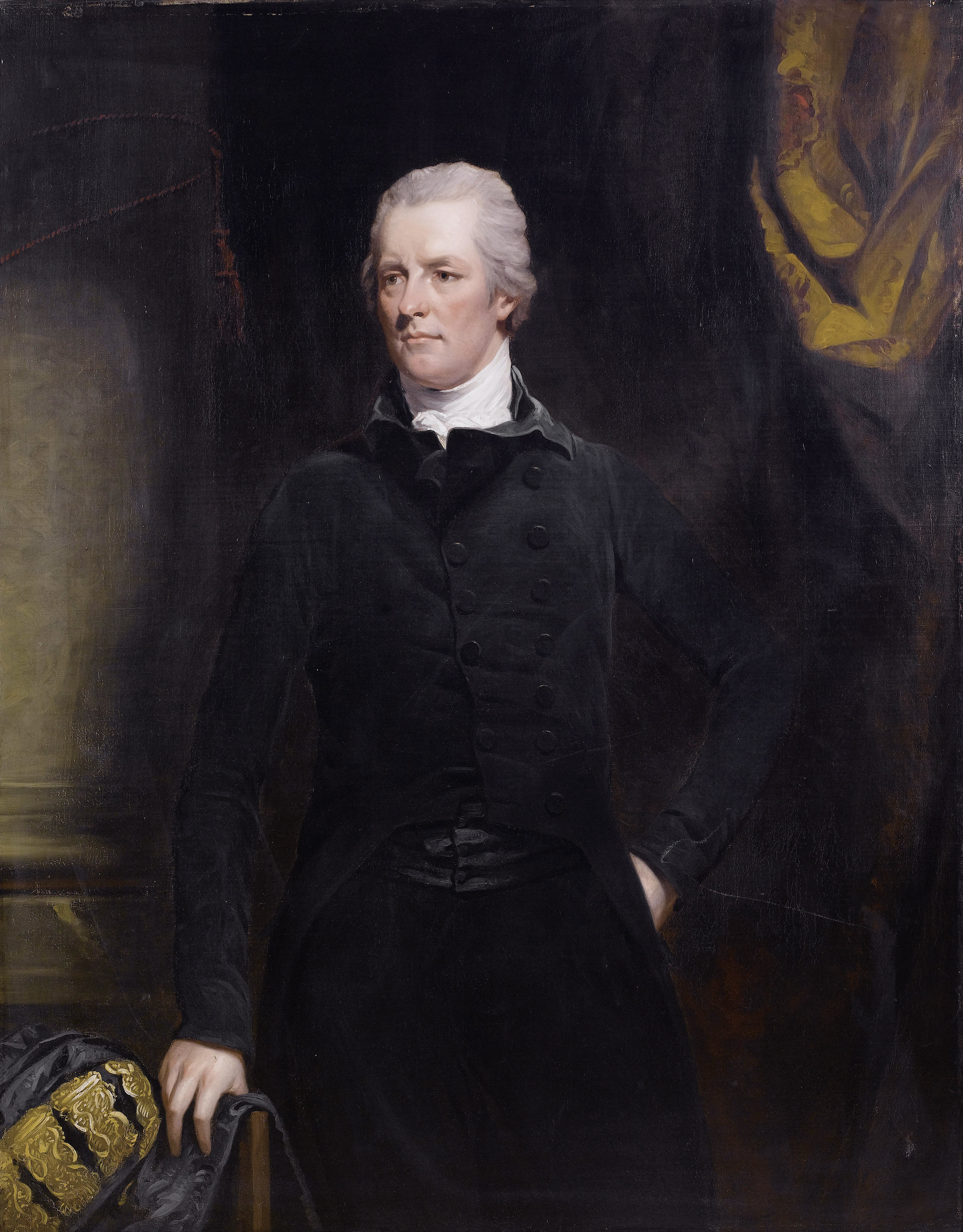
Portrait of William Pitt by John Hoppner, 1804. Political patron of both duellists

Both Castlereagh and Canning had similar roots in the Irish Ascendancy. While Castlereagh was the son of an aristocratic family with Irish-Scottish roots, George Canning was the son of a disinherited Irish landowner and an actress. He spent his early years in poverty before, thanks to the generosity of a relative, he received a privileged education at Eton and Oxford, where he excelled intellectually and was quickly regarded as a promising politician for what were considered his outstanding talents. A celebrated orator and unashamedly ambitious, he was nevertheless regarded as an outsider by his more privileged political contemporaries, who viewed him with a mixture of snobbery and suspicion because of his humble origins. By contrast, Castlereagh was perceived as the archetypal representative of a privileged group of insiders. Although widely regarded as a poor speaker, he had a knack for holding ministerial offices at key moments.

Both began their political careers as supporters of the Whigs around Charles James Fox. As the increasingly bloody French Revolution unfolded, both underwent a shift in their political orientation and joined William Pitt the Younger, who promptly recognised their political talent and supported them. Nearly of the same age, the two rapidly became rivals for promotions and government posts in Pitt's cabinet. Upon Pitt's resignation in 1801, both followed Pitt's example and returned to the backbenches. Pitt encouraged numerous of his closest political associates to join the newly constituted government under the leadership of Henry Addington (whom he had previously proposed for the role). Castlereagh followed Pitt's advice and became President of the Board of Control. However, the rhetorically adept Canning thought Pitt was wrong to resign and remained on the opposition benches, deriding Addington and ardently advocating for Pitt's cause. This angered Pitt, who had not only proposed Addington himself as his successor but regarded him as his temporary replacement and supported him in the House of Commons.

Upon Pitt's return to the office of Prime Minister in 1804, Castlereagh retained his previous office and assumed the additional role of Leader of the House of Commons, thereby relieving Pitt, whose health was already failing, of the burden of attending to the House of Commons. Apart from Pitt, he was the only Cabinet member in the House of Commons. He also became Secretary of State for War and the Colonies. Castlereagh, who had already established a reputation as a reliable and capable administrator during his tenure as a Cabinet minister, thus ascended to become an indispensable figure within the government. In contrast, the ambitious Canning was compelled to accept a relatively insignificant post outside the Cabinet and was also overlooked for subsequent Cabinet vacancies. Canning felt humiliated by these slights and considered resignation. In a candid talk with Pitt, Canning poured out his grievances. He complained about the preferment of Castlereagh ahead of himself, yet at the same time claiming he had no animus against Castlereagh. Pitt promised him the next open Cabinet post, but died in January 1806, whereupon William Grenville and Charles James Fox formed the Ministry of All the Talents.

Canning and Castlereagh were not involved in the formation of the government. In accordance with an arrangement with other young "Pittites", including Spencer Perceval and Lord Hawkesbury, the group collectively went to the opposition benches. After the death of Fox, Grenville tried to strengthen his government and split the group by making overtures to Canning and possibly Perceval, while ignoring the other two. Grenville's scheme came to nothing, as Canning declined his offer. But in a letter to his wife, he listed the other colleagues he might have been able to bring over with him and marked them according to various criteria. Castlereagh alone was awarded no positive scores at all. For the biographer John Campbell, this is an indication that Castlereagh had already become Canning's bête noire.

== Castlereagh and Canning in Portland's wartime government ==
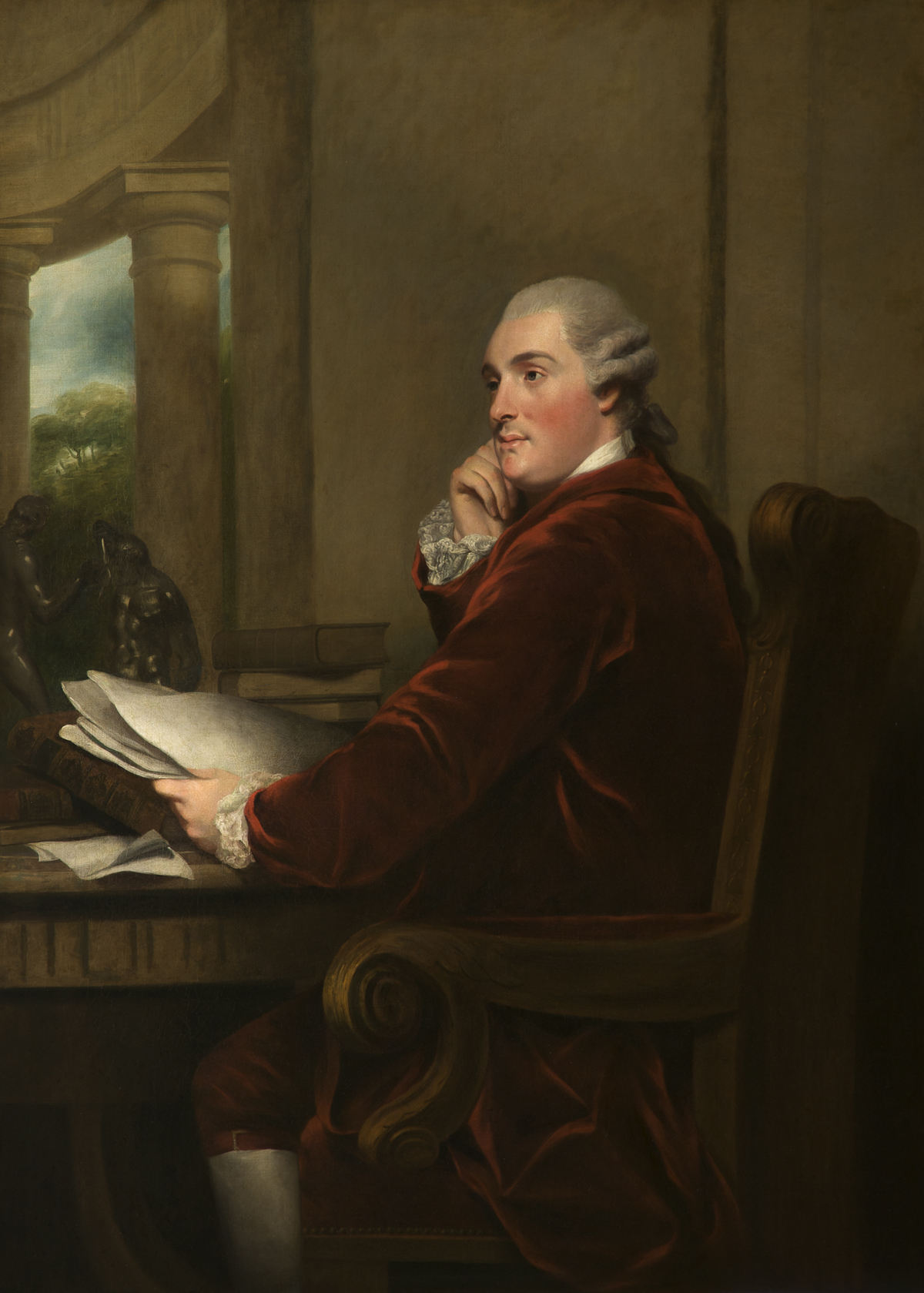
The Duke of Portland in 1782

Following the collapse of the short-lived administration of all the talents, George III turned once again to the elderly Duke of Portland to lead a new government of Pitt's followers in the spring of 1807. As in his first term as prime minister, when Charles James Fox had been the dominant figure in the government, Portland was once again more of a figurehead than the head of government. In practice, Portland proved to be weak in leadership, sluggish, and conflict-averse. He never spoke in the House of Lords and rarely attended the Treasury and the Cabinet meetings. As a result of Portland's weakness, the departments were left to themselves while the government was without a higher authority to smooth down differences between departments and arbitrate disagreements between ministers. The real figures of importance were a foursome of Pittites, consisting of Castlereagh, Canning, Spencer Perceval and Lord Hawkesbury.

In the new cabinet, Castlereagh was given his former office, the War Office. Canning leapfrogged into the government and was awarded the Foreign Office following the Marquess of Wellesley's refusal. Despite the substantial promotion, Canning also claimed the post of Leader of the House of Commons, which Castlereagh had held. Castlereagh was prepared to relinquish this office (which he felt was a burden), but refused to give it to Canning. As a compromise solution, the position was assumed by Spencer Perceval, who also became Chancellor of the Exchequer. Lord Hawkesbury (who inherited the title Earl of Liverpool in 1808 after the death of his father) was given the Home Office. Additionally, the Cabinet included Castlereagh's uncle, Lord Camden, who held the position of Lord President of the Council.

== Conflicts over warfare ==
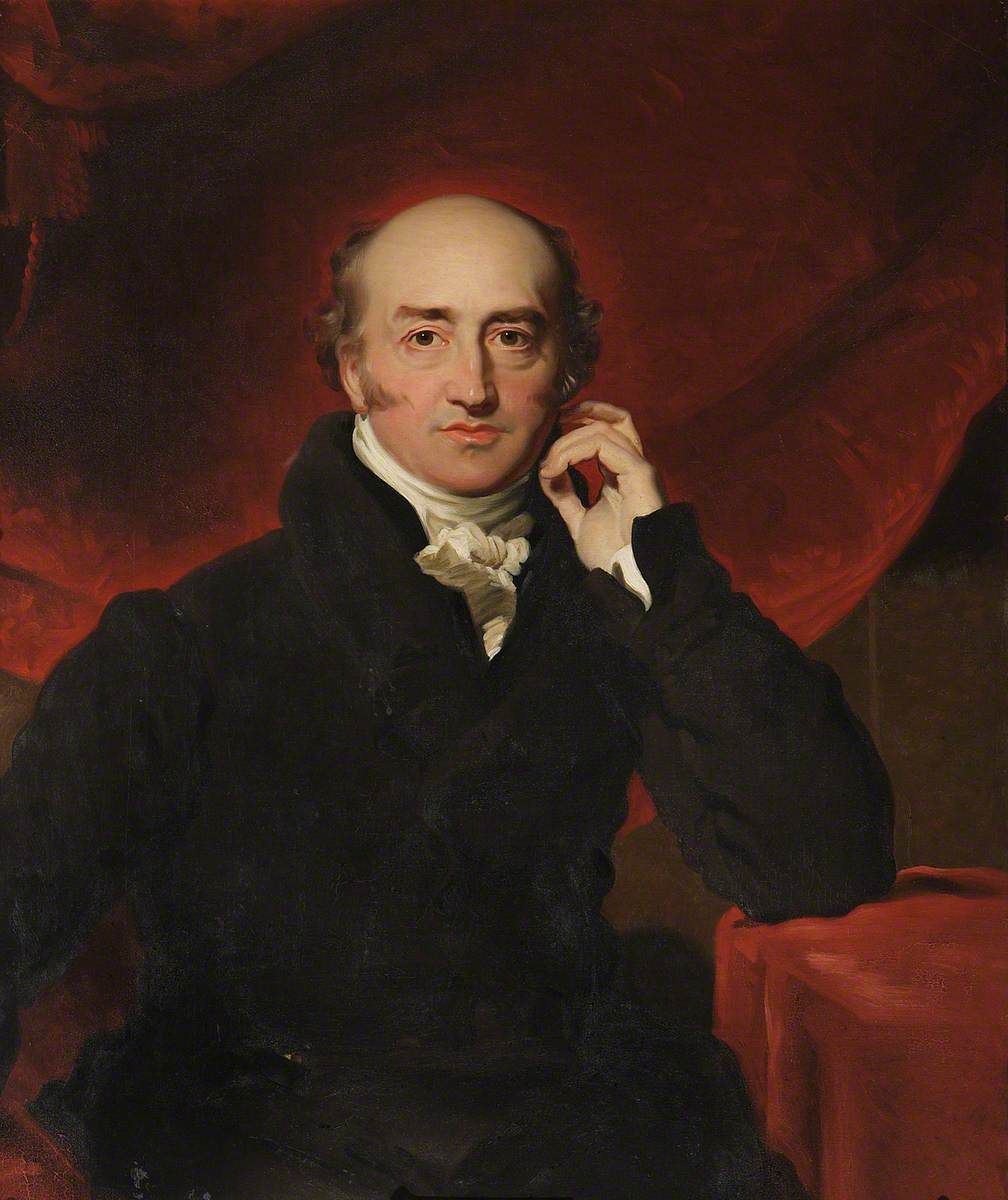
George Canning, portrait by Thomas Lawrence (around 1822)

In 1807 the real issue of importance was the war against Napoleonic France. As in the preceding governments, Portland's Cabinet was right from the start torn between different choices of strategy. Numerous disagreements arose within the Cabinet, which increasingly impeded the government's ability to function. In contrast, George Canning had increasingly established himself as the driving force of the government. To secure the maritime superiority of the Royal Navy, Canning successfully proposed neutralising the fleet of neutral Denmark either through diplomatic overtures or, if necessary, by force, to remove it from Napoleon's grasp. At the same time, he persuaded the Portuguese royal family to flee to Brazil to protect the Portuguese fleet from Napoleon's grasp.

Castlereagh supported both measures. When Napoleon's intervention in Spain presented the opportunity to open up a new theatre of war, Canning was once again the driving force behind the prompt decision to dispatch troops under the command of Arthur Wellesley (later Duke of Wellington) to the Iberian Peninsula to support the uprising against Napoleon. Castlereagh was indisposed for several months during 1808 with an unspecified illness. As a consequence, he became a liability to Canning. The two frequently disagreed in the Cabinet over the question of a suitable commander-in-chief. Canning regarded the previous commander Wellesley as a suitable choice, while Castlereagh supported George III's demands in the Cabinet for a formally higher-ranking officer and ultimately prevailed.

Wellesley's forces were victorious over the French at the Battle of Vimeiro in August 1808, but were subsequently placed under the command of the two generals Burrard and Dalrymple. In the Convention of Cintra, both generals renounced the advantages the British army had gained under Wellington before the armistice had been negotiated with France. John Moore, who was subsequently dispatched to replace the two recalled generals, and who was once again viewed with scepticism by Canning, did not fare much better in the eyes of the British Cabinet. He was compelled to withdraw his army after Napoleon intervened. Moore was killed in a rearguard action in January 1809, thereby reinstating Wellesley as commander-in-chief. The army was initially evacuated and sent to Portugal in the spring.

Despite repeatedly voicing his misgivings within the Cabinet, Canning defended Moore's campaign in the House of Commons against the opposition's intense criticism in a compelling and unanimously endorsed speech, preventing the government from suffering a setback in the subsequent close vote. Canning and Castlereagh also increasingly disagreed about the best strategic approach. Canning advocated for a concentration of the limited military forces on the Iberian theatre of war. Castlereagh, on the other hand, was preparing a British invasion of the Netherlands or northern France in parallel with the Iberian campaign to support and relieve the military pressure from France on the British ally Austria. This led to the planning of the Walcheren Expedition. Canning perceived this as a potential threat to the success of the Iberian campaign, yet he ultimately acquiesced to the majority decision of the Cabinet.

Canning initiated a discussion with Portland and conveyed his opinion that the government was not adequately equipped to fulfill its duties. He also alluded to the possibility of his resignation. Portland invited Canning to his country estate in Buckinghamshire during the Easter recess, where Canning reiterated his comments. He advised Portland to resign for health reasons, suggested to Portland that the Earl of Chatham (brother of William Pitt the Younger) might be a suitable successor and also demanded a new appointment to the War Office. Portland, who was reluctant to lose either Canning or Castlereagh, attempted to pacify Canning by agreeing in principle, although he initially took no further action. Instead, he initially informed Lord Bathurst (the President of the Board of Trade), but not Castlereagh, who was left in the dark. On 10 May he met the King, who refused to accept the resignation of his Prime Minister. Over the summer, other ministers were involved in discussions about the Cabinet reshuffle and how to deal with Castlereagh. Castlereagh's uncle Lord Camden was also involved in May 1809, but could not bring himself to report openly to his nephew about what was happening. Portland and Canning initially assumed the opposite. In mid-July Canning learned with some consternation that Camden had remained inactive.

George III was unwilling to accept Canning's resignation and simultaneously prohibited Portland from informing Castlereagh of the events. Giles Hunt interprets the King's actions as an attempt to prevent the ambitious Canning from becoming the next Prime Minister. He did not trust Canning as Canning had earlier supported Catholic emancipation. Furthermore, Canning — who was the only man in the Cabinet who was neither a lord nor the son of a lord — was widely seen as a man who needed to be kept in his place. Canning, who observed the country in a state of imminent peril in a life-and-death struggle with a superior opponent, became increasingly restless and regularly renewed his demands to Portland, threatening to resign. While he dutifully defended the government and the war effort in the House of Commons, he harshly denounced what he saw as intolerable conditions to acquaintances. For Giles Hunt, Canning's actions were not a blow against a political rival, but rather an expression of mounting despair throughout the war. From an insider's perspective, Canning had observed that the Cabinet was unable to effectively manage the various crises and that the war was on the verge of going badly.

John Campbell, however, notes that Canning was not only the dominant figure in the cabinet at this time, but was also increasingly acting like it. He was already openly strategising for the foreseeable succession to the Prime Minister, in which he and Spencer Perceval were considered the two most promising candidates. He prepared a memorandum for the King in which he argued against having the next Prime Minister from the House of Lords, insisting that the Prime Minister must be in the House of Commons. This would have limited the succession to him and Spencer Perceval. He also stated in the memorandum that he did not want to serve under Perceval, which would have influenced the election in his favour as an indispensable member of the cabinet. Additionally, he pledged to Lord Wellesley (Arthur Wellesley's brother) the position of Minister of War as soon as Castlereagh had been removed from office, despite lacking the requisite credentials. In his book Choose your Weapons. The British Foreign Secretary Douglas Hurd also perceived Canning's actions as presumptuous and his demand for dismissal as an act that transgressed the boundaries of normal political competition.

== Castlereagh's challenge ==
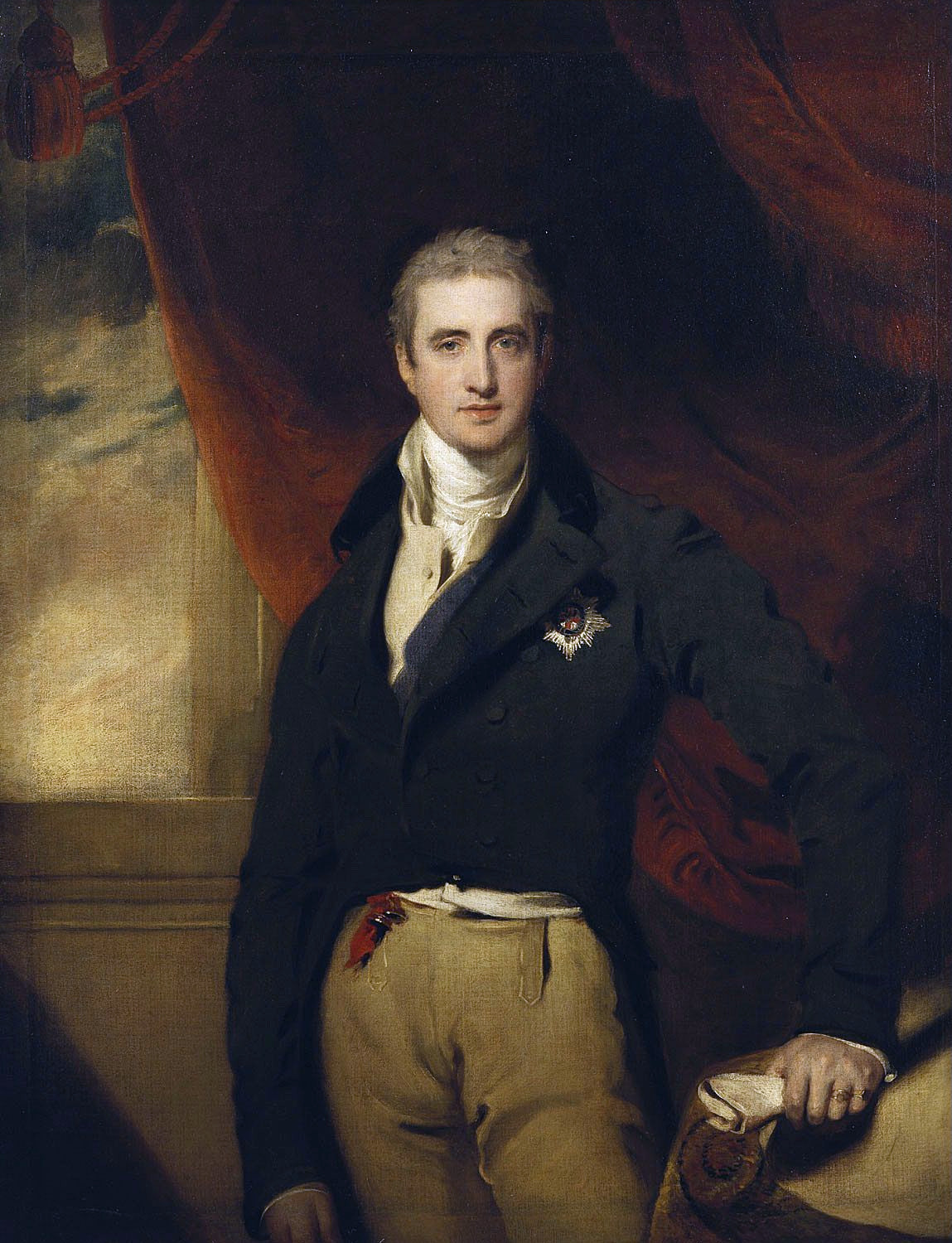
Viscount Castlereagh, portrait by Thomas Lawrence (c. 1817)

The Walcheren Campaign soon failed to reach its goals and swiftly deteriorated into a military disaster during the summer of 1809, ultimately proving to be a complete failure. For Canning, this was the last straw, as it confirmed his previous worries about the campaign. Within days, he ultimately demanded Castlereagh's immediate dismissal. Perceval and Lord Liverpool, however, thought otherwise, as they devised a scheme in which a Cabinet overhaul was the means used to remove the unsuspecting Castlereagh from the War Office without exposing him (and ultimately the government) in public. Portland, having suffered a stroke in August 1809, accepted the scheme and announced his resignation on 6 September 1809, as soon as there was agreement on his successor. He also informed Canning at the same time that Castlereagh could not simply be dismissed. Canning then renewed his resignation and absented himself from the Cabinet meeting the following day. He probably anticipated being able to secure his appointment as prime minister through this means.

Castlereagh, oblivious until now, then became suspicious and demanded an explanation from his uncle, who unveiled all the machinations behind Castlereagh's back. In turn, Castlereagh also tendered his resignation and ceased attending cabinet meetings. Castlereagh spent the next 12 days brooding over past events. Then he sent Canning a letter, some nine pages long, on 19 September 1809, in which he accused him of violating the principle of good faith, both privately and publicly. While he admitted Canning's right on public grounds to demand his removal, he strongly objected to the deception and felt that his honour had been violated. He also accused Canning of conspiring behind his back. The stiffly worded letter was tantamount to an invitation to a duel. Castlereagh named Lord Yarmouth as his second, while Canning named Charles Ellis. Ellis attempted to mediate and sent Yarmouth copies of several letters in which Canning had warned the Prime Minister not to conceal the ongoing discussions. Nevertheless, Castlereagh, who felt humiliated and betrayed, remained adamant and indicated that Canning could have resigned himself instead of being a party to the deceit. Canning was thus compelled to acquiesce to the demand for a duel.

== Background: Duels as a social practice ==
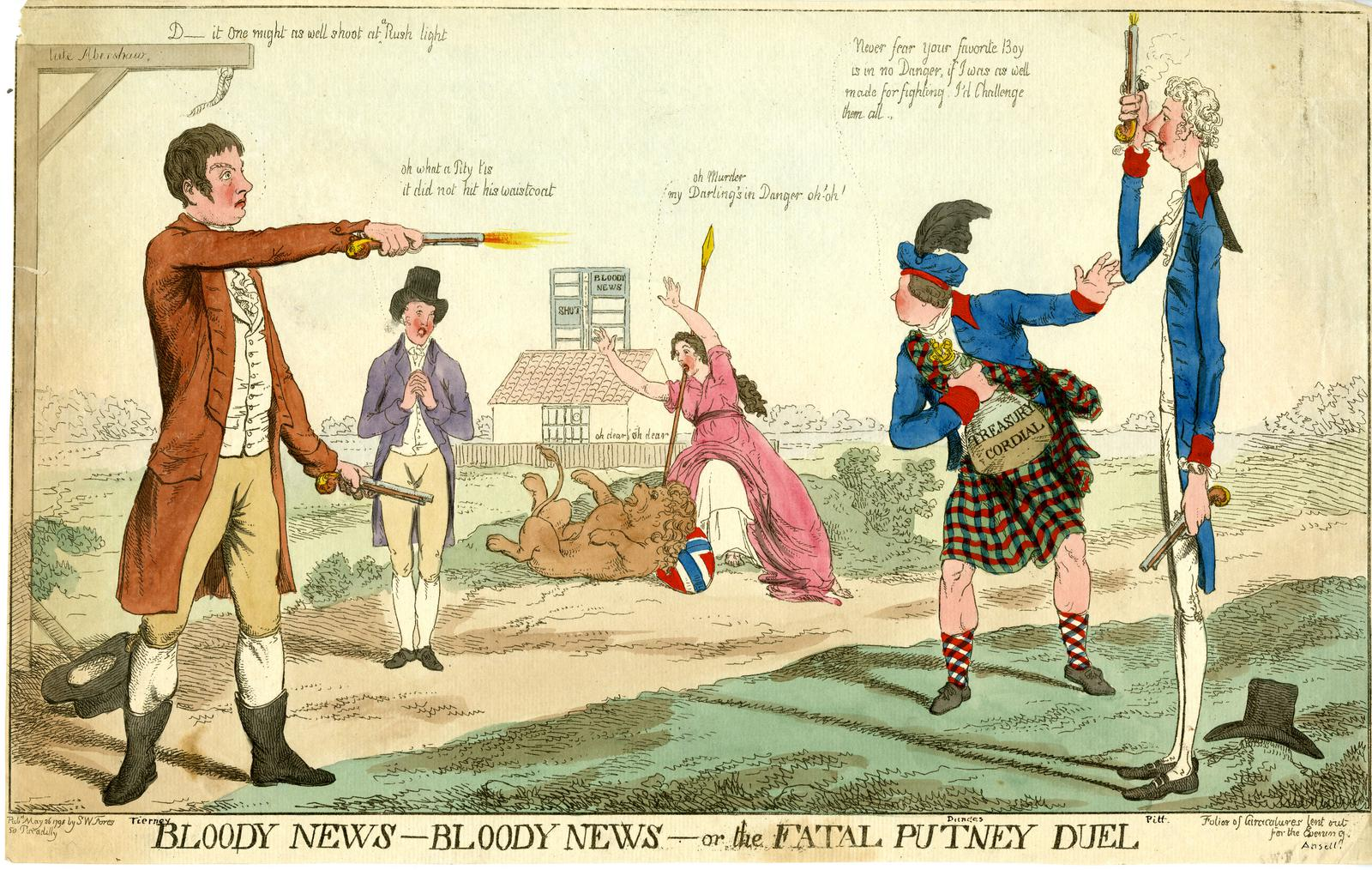
Caricature of the duel between Pitt the Younger and his opponent George Tierney (1798)

While supposedly illegal, by the dawn of the 19th century duels still occurred fairly regularly and continued to be a common practice in the upper echelons of society. To avoid social ostracism, those who were challenged had few options but to accept the duel challenge.

While in previous centuries thrusting weapons were the favourite choice for a duel, in the late 18th century pistols had become the usual choice of weapon. Eighteenth century weapons were highly inaccurate; duellists were often not sufficiently familiar with these weapons and sometimes deliberately shot wild. All of this caused the great majority of duels to end without a fatal outcome or injuries. If both were content that honour had been met, the business was ended after the first round.

The practice of duelling was not uncommon among high-ranking politicians. For example, Charles James Fox was injured in a duel in 1779. His political nemesis, William Pitt the Younger, had fought a duel with George Tierney in May 1798 following a slight in the House of Commons. Both combatants emerged unscathed from the initial exchange of fire at twelve paces. Pitt discharged his weapon into the air during the second encounter, and both parties subsequently agreed that further action was unnecessary. George III was enraged and dismayed upon learning of the incident and reminded Pitt that as Prime Minister, he should have prioritised the interests of the nation over personal considerations. Nevertheless, the practice of duelling persisted.

== The duel ==
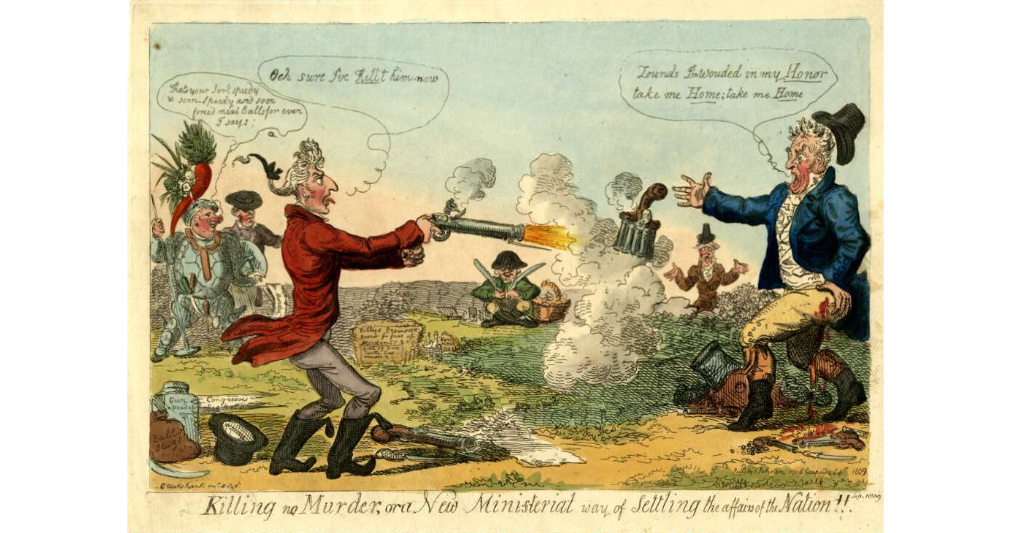
Satirical depiction of the duel between Castlereagh and Canning by Isaac Cruikshank

The duel took place at 6 a.m. on 21 September 1809 at Putney Heath on Lord Yarmouth's estate — within sight of the house where Pitt the Younger had died three years earlier. Both duellists were accompanied by their seconds. According to the report of his second, Castlereagh was in a relaxed and cheerful mood during the carriage ride to the duel site and calmly talking in a lively discussion about a fashionable opera singer. Castlereagh was an accomplished marksman; in his youth in Ireland, a political opponent had withdrawn his challenge when he learned of Castlereagh's skill with a gun. By contrast, Canning had made his will and written a farewell note to his wife before the duel. Canning had never fired a gun and had never fought a duel. Therefore, his second and Yarmouth had to load and cock the gun for Canning. After a final attempt at mediation by the seconds failed, the duel took place.

The first duel, fought at a distance of twelve paces, was inconclusive. After a brief exchange between the seconds, Castlereagh declared that he was still not satisfied, so a second engagement was necessary. During the second duel, Castlereagh's shot pierced Canning's thigh. It is unconfirmed that Canning's second shot grazed Castlereagh and shot off a button. Canning, who was hit, asked if a third round was necessary, which was immediately stopped by the two seconds who declared the matter closed. His second and Castlereagh helped Canning to Lord Yarmouth's nearby cottage, where a surgeon was already waiting to treat Canning's wound. Because the bullet had passed through the flesh of the thigh and not an artery, there was little blood loss and Canning's wound healed completely within a few weeks.

== Public reaction after the duel ==
Details of the duel quickly emerged in the press. The next day, the Morning Chronicle published a detailed account of the duel, as well as an editorial by its editor, a scathing attack on the two protagonists who had behaved irresponsibly at a time of national crisis. Other newspapers picked up on the story and satirised the duel between "Mr. Canting" and "Lord Castaway". The Courier, which unlike the Morning Chronicle was closer to the government than to the Whig opposition, revealed a few days later that the reason for the duel had been the demand for Castlereagh's dismissal. While the government initially tried to portray the duel as the result of a misunderstanding, William Wilberforce called the duel disgraceful and demanded that both men never hold office again. Spencer Perceval privately said that Castlereagh had acted out of a complete misunderstanding, while Lord Holland (the nephew of Charles James Fox) said that Castlereagh's behaviour was more a sign of a thirst for revenge than a sense of wounded honour. The leading Whig Charles Grey saw Castlereagh as being in the right and said that it was impossible to defend Canning's conduct.

The majority of public opinion initially thought Canning was right. Castlereagh first justified himself to his closest relatives in the form of a letter. He sent a letter to the King in which he apologised for demanding a duel, but at the same time denied that Canning had any reason to complain about his actions as Minister of War. On 3 October 1809 he also published a vindication, which caused a shift in opinion as Castlereagh was now seen as the victim of a conspiracy by his Cabinet colleagues who had secretly plotted against him. A friend and Castlereagh loyalist leaked details of the duel and the events leading up to it to the leading British newspaper The Times in early October. Canning responded, also in The Times, with his version in an open letter to Lord Camden, placing some of the blame on Camden. In the aftermath of the duel George III was shocked that "two persons still in possession of the seals of office violate the laws". A few days later however, George III was visited by Canning, who noted afterwards that to his surprise the King immediately began to ask about the particulars of the duel and took some enjoyment by hearing Canning's account.

== Impact ==
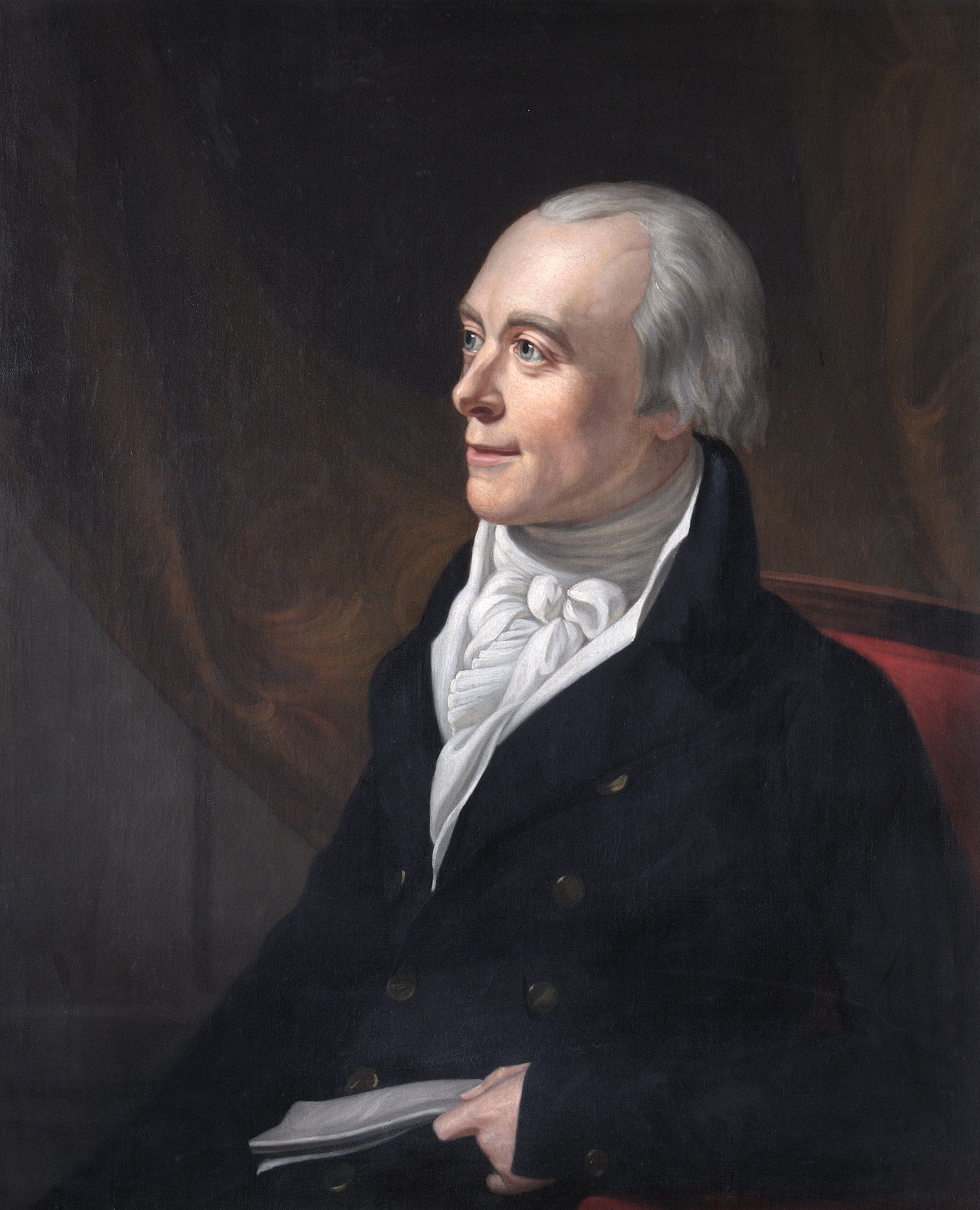
Spencer Perceval (1812)

The duel had lasting consequences both for the two protagonists and for British politics. Just two days before the duel, Spencer Perceval and several Cabinet members had come to an understanding that the only choices left for the government were to bring in the leading masterminds of the opposition (Grenville and Grey) into the government or recommend Canning to the King as Portland's successor. With Canning and Castlereagh now on the backbenches, two of the leading politicians had fallen far in public esteem and were outside any discussion of succession. The attempt to include the opposition failed, whereupon Spencer Perceval became the new Prime Minister, forming a new government mainly based around Lord Liverpool as Secretary of State for War and Colonies and Lord Wellesley as Foreign Secretary.

Castlereagh and Canning spent the next few years out of government; Castlereagh, less driven than Canning, was not unhappy with his exile and enjoyed the idleness. The restless Canning, on the other hand, found it difficult to come to terms with the frustrating role of backbencher. After a year, Perceval attempted to bring back both duellists into his government. The attempt came to nothing when Castlereagh refused and Perceval wanted either both or neither back in the Cabinet. Another attempt, after Wellesley's resignation, failed due to Canning's unreasonably high demands; Liverpool, the successor to the assassinated Perceval, then ignored Canning. He and Castlereagh quickly came to an agreement that Castlereagh would serve as the new Foreign Secretary. Castlereagh held the post until 1822 and played a key role in the political reorganisation of Europe after Napoleon's defeat.

== Research history ==
Between 1929 and 1931, the duel was the subject of a discussion between two Cambridge historians, Harold Temperley and Charles Webster, in the Cambridge Historical Journal. Webster, who had published a study of Castlereagh's foreign policy, defended Castlereagh. Temperley, Canning's biographer, justified Canning's conduct; he saw the influence of George III as decisive and the King as the one really responsible. He cited as evidence George III's letter to Portland in which George III swore Portland to secrecy and forbade everyone to inform Castlereagh about the ongoing discussion.

The duel between the two was the subject of a separate book by Giles Hunt in 2008 (The Duel: Castlereagh, Canning and Deadly Cabinet Rivalry). In his conclusion, Hunt noted that the duel ultimately had a positive effect on Castlereagh's political career, citing a ruling by Thomas Creevey in 1818 and explaining that Castlereagh's career was effectively over before the duel, but that the duel rehabilitated him in the eyes of the majority of the public. He also saw Castlereagh's demand for a duel as a hot-blooded act.

In 2009, John Campbell published his book Pistols at Dawn: Two Hundred Years of Political Rivalry from Pitt and Fox to Blair and Brown. He devoted the second chapter to the Castlereagh–Canning rivalry (Viscount Castlereagh and George Canning), describing the duel as the culmination of a political rivalry that spanned the entire political careers of both men. While political duels and political rivalries were and are nothing unusual, he saw the attempt by the two duellists to kill each other against the backdrop of the greatest war in British history to that point as unprecedented. He also referred to Thomas Creevey's judgment and saw Castlereagh as the beneficiary of the duel.

In 2010, the complex interaction between Canning and Castlereagh was taken up by Douglas Hurd in a study of the foreign policy of successive British Foreign Secretaries; he saw the duel as the result of intense rivalry and ambition. He also noted that the tragedy of the duel was that although Pitt the Younger taught his two talented protégés much about the art of politics, he was never able to bring them together and get them to work together.

== See also ==
- Wellington–Winchilsea duel, an 1829 duel involving the Duke of Wellington

== Bibliography ==
- Bew, John (2012), Castlereagh. A Life., Oxford: Oxford University Press, ISBN 978-0-19-993159-0
- Campbell, John (2009), "Viscount Castlereagh and George Canning", Pistols at Dawn: Two Hundred Years of Political Rivalry from Pitt and Fox to Blair and Brown., London: Vintage Books, pp. 57–89, ISBN 978-1-84595-091-0
- Hunt, Giles (2008), The Duel: Castlereagh, Canning and Deadly Cabinet Rivalry., London: I.B. Tauris, ISBN 978-1-84511-593-7
- Hurd, Douglas (2010), "Castlereagh and Canning", Choose your Weapons. The British Foreign Secretary., London: Weidenfeld & Nicolson, pp. 1–68, ISBN 978-0-297-85334-3
