= Wellington–Winchilsea duel =

1829 duel in the United Kingdom

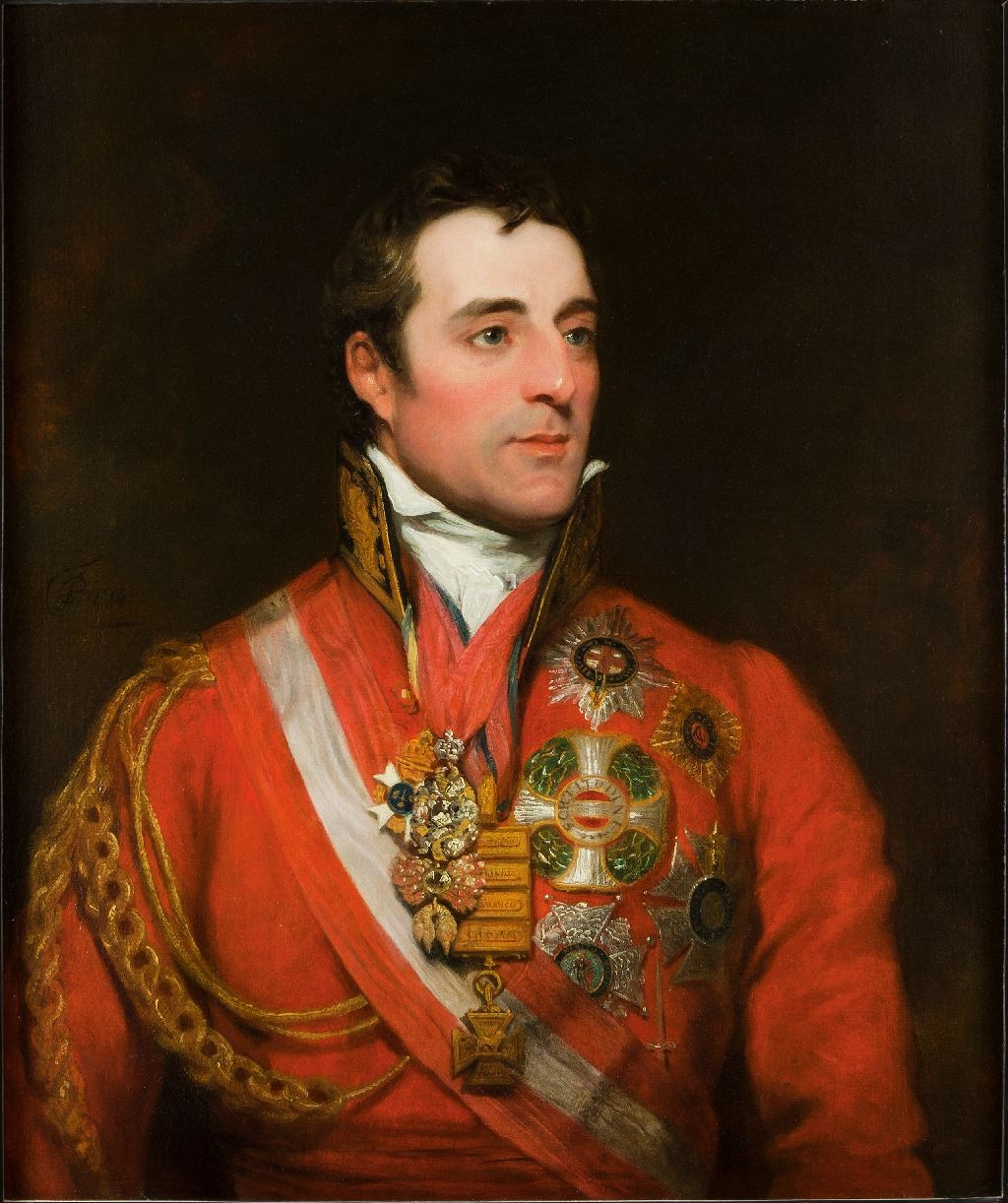
Portrait of the Duke of Wellington c.1814

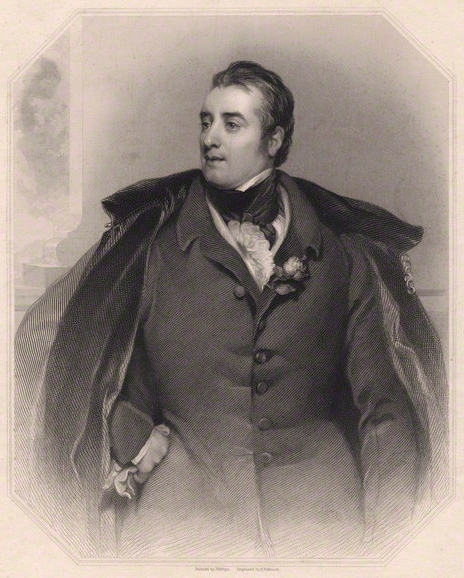
The Earl of Winchilsea, c.1839

The Wellington-Winchilsea Duel took place on 21 March 1829 at Battersea, then in Surrey on the outskirts of London. It was a bloodless duel fought between the British prime minister Arthur Wellesley, 1st Duke of Wellington and George Finch-Hatton, 10th Earl of Winchilsea.

It was the second and last duel fought by a sitting prime minister following the 1798 Pitt–Tierney duel on Putney Heath.

== Background ==
The duel was sparked by the Wellington Government's introduction of Catholic Emancipation the same year. This marked a shift in Wellington's position. Although not unsympathetic to Catholics (having served alongside many during his military career), Wellington had previously opposed the proposed measures. However his pragmatic move to accept them angered many of his former supporters, who formed the Ultra-Tory movement.

Winchilsea, an aristocrat more than 20 years Wellington's junior, was opposed to Catholic relief. He attacked the Duke verbally and accused him in a letter to The Standard on 14 March 1829 of "an insidious design for the infringement of our liberties and the introduction of Popery into every department of the State". Wellington wrote to him demanding a formal apology but Winchilsea, while privately admitting he had gone too far, felt he could not back down without losing his honour. Wellington then challenged him to a duel. He was likely irritated to find himself in such a situation, having avoided and opposed duels throughout his military career.

== Duel ==
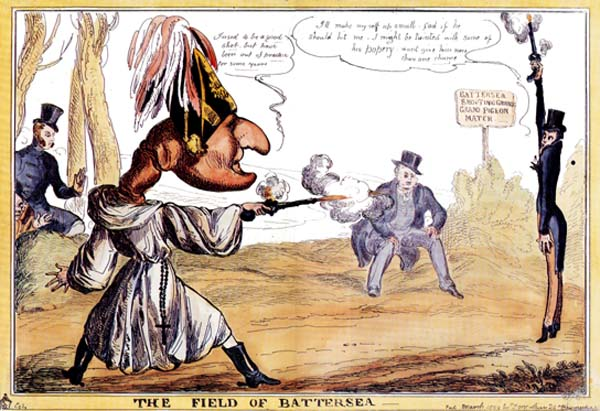
A print caricaturing the duel by William Heath

The Duke appointed his old comrade Sir Henry Hardinge as his second while Lord Falmouth acted for Winchilsea. John Robert Hume, the military surgeon who had served with Wellington in the Peninsular War and at the Battle of Waterloo, was in attendance. He produced a detailed account of the exchange.

The two participants met early in the day at Battersea Fields, with Wellington's party having crossed Battersea Bridge on horseback while Winchilsea's took a more roundabout route via Putney Bridge, their coachman having mistakenly driven them to Putney instead of Battersea. By common practice of the era, the combatants were to use duelling pistols rather than swords. The seconds exchanged conversation and it was clear that Falmouth was alarmed in case Wellington was killed or wounded and he should be blamed.

Once the pistols were loaded, the two men took up position twelve paces from each other. Wellington remained silent and aloof during the build-up. Once the command was given to fire Wellington raised his pistol and fired, missing Winchilsea. His opponent, having remained motionless, now raised his pistol and fired at the sky (an act known as deloping).

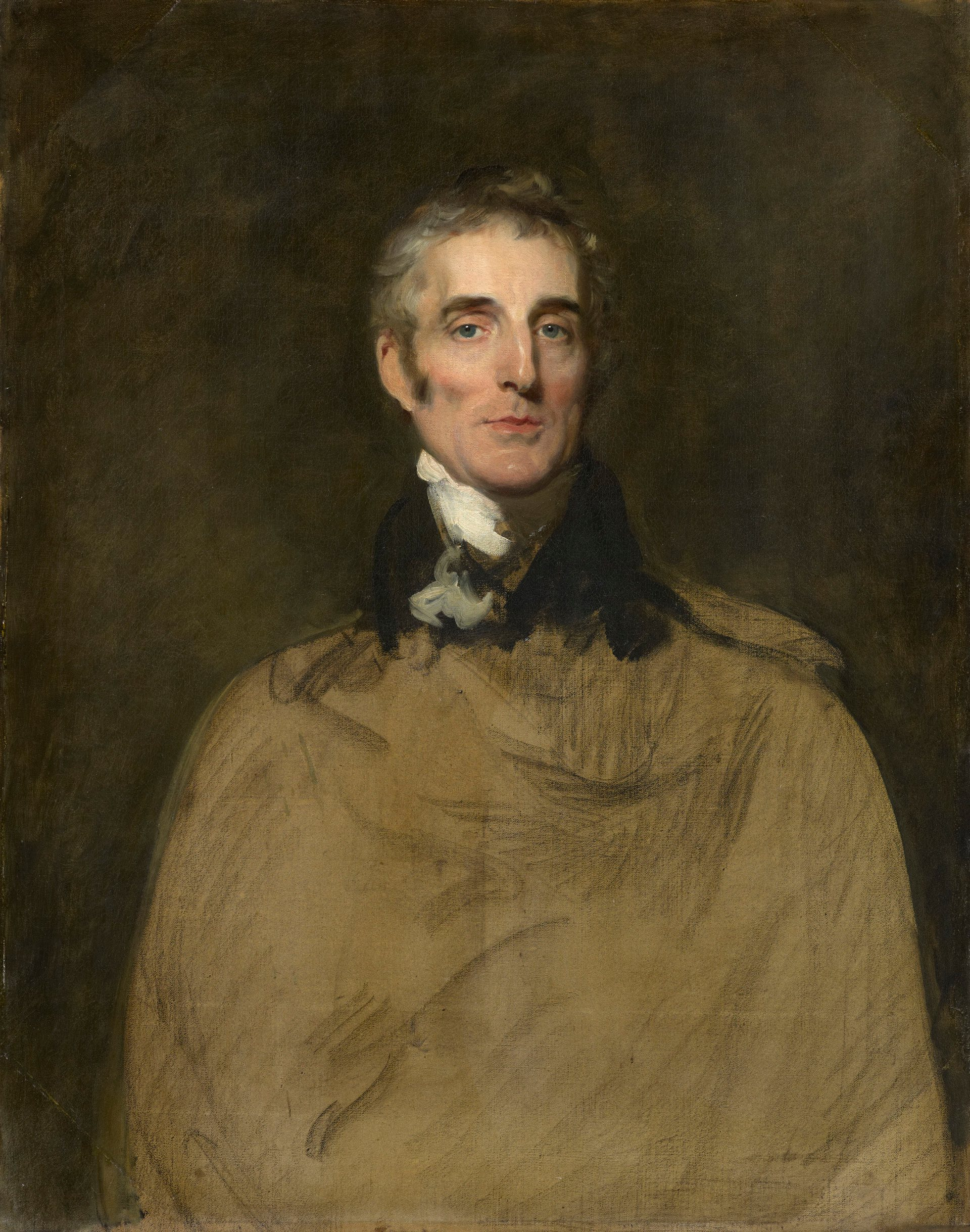
Unfinished portrait of Duke of Wellington c.1829 by Thomas Lawrence.

Having faced Wellington's shot there was no longer any allegation of cowardice that could be thrown at Winchilsea. His second, Falmouth, eagerly accepted that Winchilsea had been in the wrong and was now able to apologise unconditionally.

=== Aftermath ===
Newspapers, political commentators, and popular opinion were scandalised by news of the duel. The Morning Post, for example, talked of the potential loss of the "first warrior of England", saying it was "too monstrous" that Wellington should risk his life "in compliance with this social superstition." However, Wellington's reputation was enhanced, and he was seen to have outflanked his political opponents by impressing public opinion and stopping slanders undermining his government. He said: "The atmosphere of calumny in which I had been for some time living cleared away."

The Old King's Club, an alumni association of King's College School, holds an annual dinner marking 'Duel Day', and the university King's College, London (founded by Wellington) says that its "alumni all over the world have since commemorated Wellington’s role in the founding of King’s by gathering for social occasions on Duel Day and sometimes even re-enacting the duel itself."

The duel was the second and last fought by a sitting prime minister following the 1798 Pitt–Tierney duel on Putney Heath.

=== Relationship afterwards ===
Wellington and Winchilsea subsequently remained on most friendly terms. Wellington frequently invited Winchilsea, a fellow Tory, to various dinners or parties. In 1834, Wellington even specifically came up to London from his country estate to witness Winchilsea's second wedding, to Wellington's great-niece, Emily Bagot (daughter of Lady Anne Wellesley). After the wedding he went back to his country estate, Stratfield Saye House.

== See also ==
- Castlereagh-Canning duel, an 1809 duel between two government ministers that ended with the latter wounded in the leg

== Bibliography ==
- Banks, Stephen. A Polite Exchange of Bullets: The Duel and the English Gentleman, 1750-1850. Boydell & Brewer, 2010.
- Muir, Rory. Wellington: Waterloo and the Fortunes of Peace 1814–1852. Yale University Press, 2015.
- Steinmetz, Andrew (1868). The Romance of Duelling. London: Chapman and Hall. pp. 336–343.
