= Portland ministry =

Portland ministry may refer to:

- First Portland ministry, the British government led by the Duke of Portland from April to December 1783
- Second Portland ministry, the British government led by the Duke of Portland from 1807 to 1809
