= Unfinished Wellington =

1829 painting by Thomas Lawrence

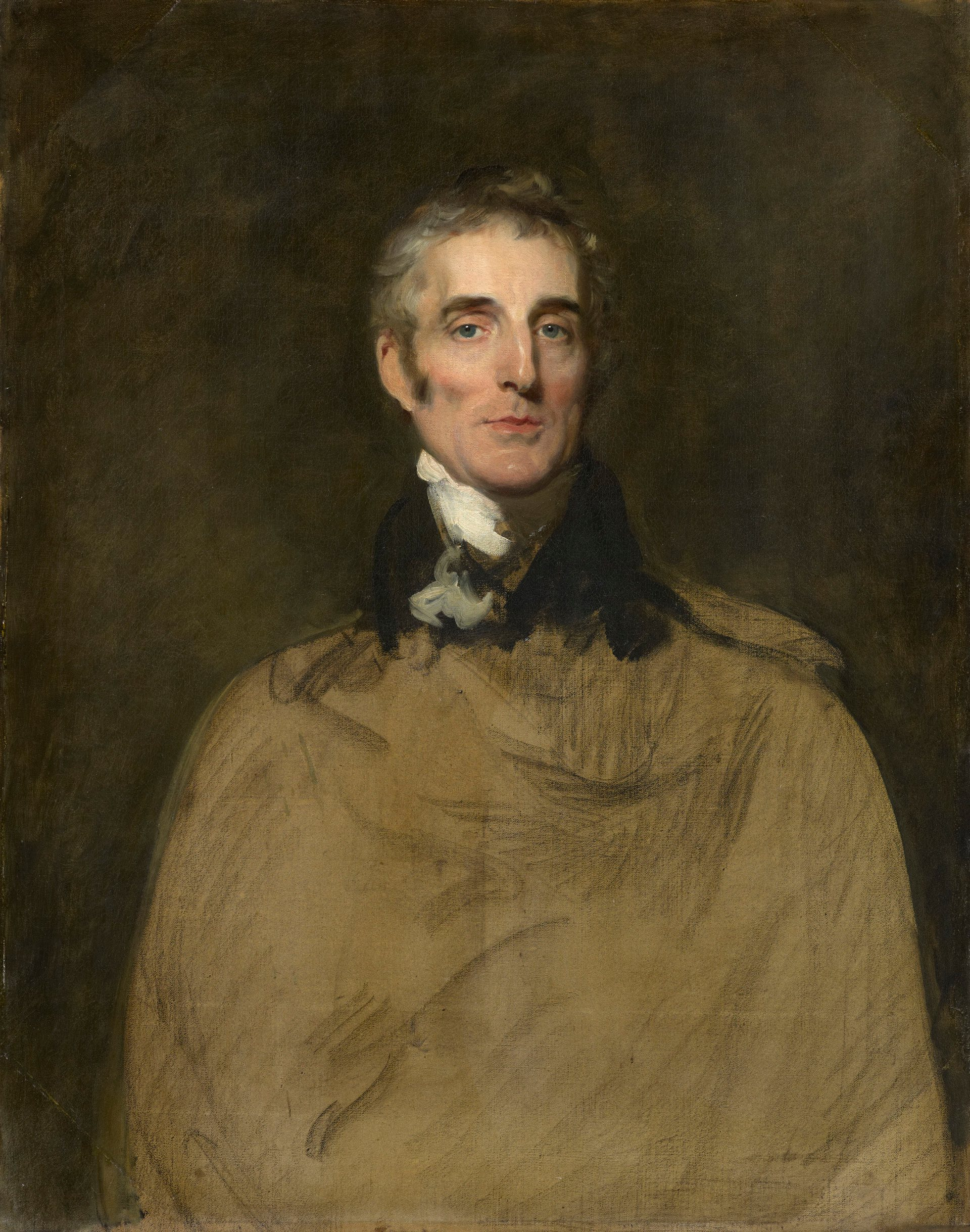
- Artist: Thomas Lawrence
- Year: 1829
- Type: Oil on canvas, portrait painting
- Dimensions: 96.5 cm × 76.2 cm (38.0 in × 30.0 in)
- Location: National Portrait Gallery; London

The Unfinished Wellington is an 1829 portrait painting by the British artist Thomas Lawrence. It is an unfinished depiction of the Anglo-Irish general and politician the Duke of Wellington, known in particular for his role in the defeat of Napoleon. It is also known as the Jersey Portrait.

Lawrence had painted Wellington a number of times. These works included the Portrait of the Duke of Wellington at Apsley House and his entry into the Waterloo Chamber at Windsor Castle. He was widely regarded as the leading portraitist of the Regency era. The work was commissioned by Wellington's friend and admirer the Countess of Jersey. At the time he sat for this portrait, Wellington was serving as Prime Minister. The same year he steered through the controversial Catholic Emancipation measure and fought a duel over it. However the painting remained unfinished when Lawrence died suddenly in January 1830. While many of Lawrence's unfinished works were completed by his protege and assistant Richard Evans, Lady Jersey insisted this should remain in its original form.

In 2017 the painting came onto the market. A fundraising campaign was launched by the National Portrait Gallery to purchase the painting. It was ultimately acquired for £1.3 million.

== Bibliography ==
- Cox, Paul. Wellington: Triumphs, Politics and Passions. National Portrait Gallery, 2015.
- Wellesley, Charles. Wellington Portrayed. Unicorn Press, 2014
