= Perceval ministry =

- 1809–1812
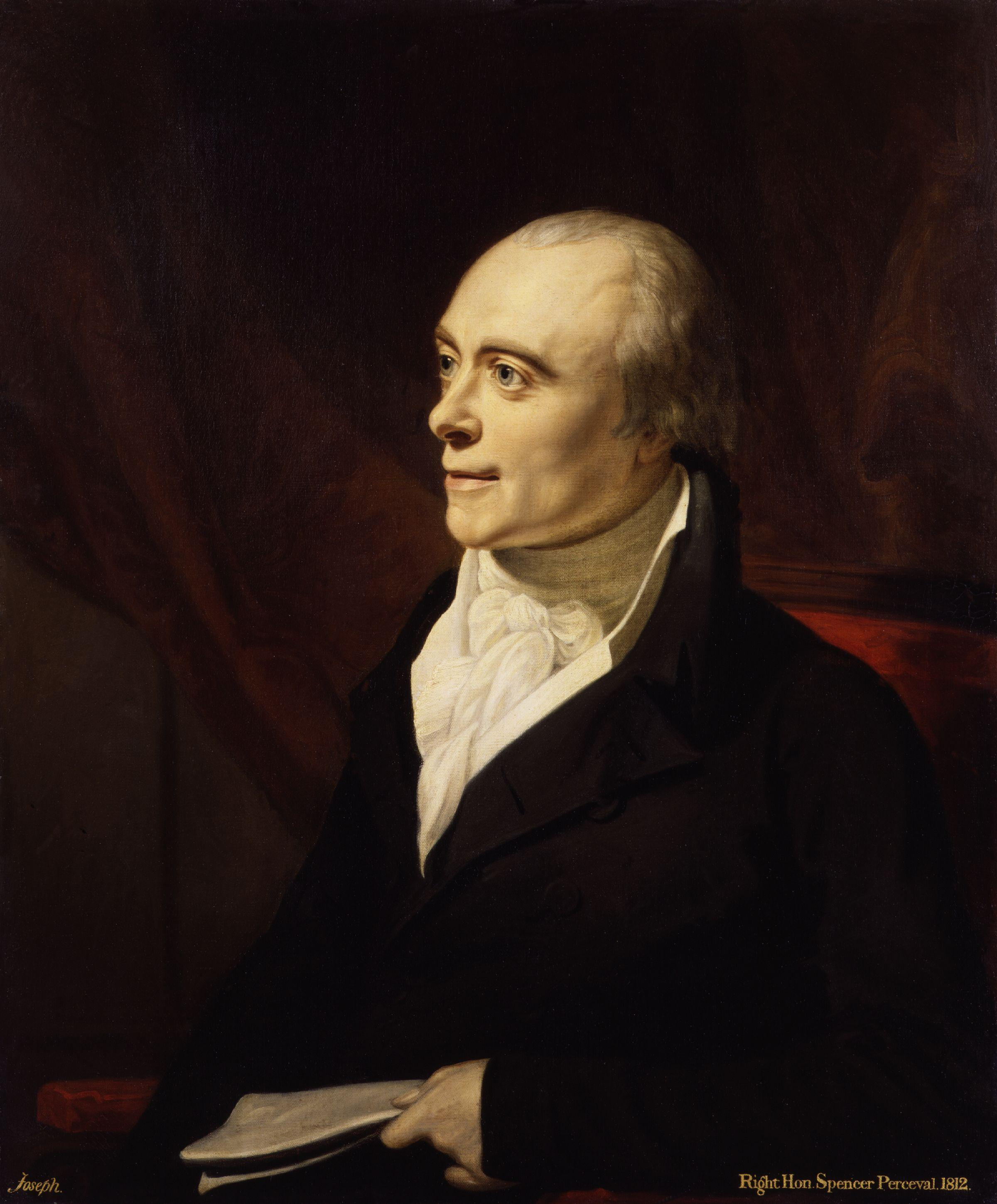
- Perceval (1812)
- Date formed: 4 October 1809
- Date dissolved: 11 May 1812

People and organisations
- Monarch: George III
- Represented by: Prince Regent (1811–12)
- Prime Minister: Spencer Perceval
- Total no. of members: 95 appointments
- Member party: Tory Party
- Status in legislature: Majority
- Opposition party: Whig Party
- Opposition leaders: George Ponsonby in the House of Commons; Lord Grenville in the House of Lords

History
- Legislature terms: 4th UK Parliament
- Predecessor: Second Portland ministry
- Successor: Liverpool ministry

This is a list of members of the government of the United Kingdom in office under the leadership of Spencer Perceval from 1809 to 1812. (Note: The Perceval ministry coincided with the start of the Regency era, when George III was formally deemed unfit to reign while his son ruled in his stead as prince regent. It dissolved with the assassination of Perceval in May 1812—the first and only assassination of a British prime minister.)

== Cabinet ==
Portfolio	Minister	Took office	Left office
First Lord of the Treasury; Leader of the House of Commons; Chancellor of the Exchequer; Chancellor of the Duchy of Lancaster	Spencer Perceval (head of ministry)	4 October 1809	11 May 1812
Lord Chancellor	John Scott, 1st Earl of Eldon	1807	1827
Lord President of the Council	John Pratt, 1st Earl Camden	26 March 1807	8 April 1812
Lord President of the Council	Henry Addington, 1st Viscount Sidmouth	8 April 1812	11 June 1812
Lord Privy Seal	John Fane, 10th Earl of Westmorland	1807	1827
Secretary of State for the Home Department	Richard Ryder	1 November 1809	8 June 1812
Secretary of State for Foreign Affairs	Henry Bathurst, 3rd Earl Bathurst	1 November 1809	6 December 1809
Secretary of State for Foreign Affairs	Richard Wellesley, 1st Marquess Wellesley	6 December 1809	4 March 1812
Secretary of State for Foreign Affairs	Robert Stewart, Viscount Castlereagh	4 March 1812	12 August 1822
President of the Board of Trade	Henry Bathurst, 3rd Earl Bathurst	31 March 1807	29 September 1812
Secretary of State for War and the Colonies; Leader of the House of Lords	Robert Jenkinson, 2nd Earl of Liverpool	1 November 1809	11 June 1812
First Lord of the Admiralty	Henry Phipps, 1st Earl of Mulgrave	1807	1810
First Lord of the Admiralty	Charles Philip Yorke	1810	1812
Master-General of the Ordnance	John Pitt, 2nd Earl of Chatham	1807	1810
Master-General of the Ordnance	Henry Phipps, 1st Earl of Mulgrave	1810	1819
Minister without Portfolio	Dudley Ryder, 1st Earl of Harrowby	November 1809	June 1812
Minister without Portfolio	John Pratt, 1st Earl Camden	8 April 1812	December 1812

=== Changes ===
- December 1809 – Lord Wellesley succeeds Lord Bathurst as Foreign Secretary. Bathurst continues at the Board of Trade.
- May 1810 – Lord Mulgrave succeeds Lord Chatham as Master-General of the Ordnance. Charles Philip Yorke succeeds Mulgrave as First Lord of the Admiralty.
- March 1812 – Lord Castlereagh succeeds Wellesley as Foreign Secretary.
- April 1812 – Lord Sidmouth succeeds Lord Camden as Lord President. Camden remains in the cabinet as a minister without portfolio.
- May 1812 – Perceval is shot and killed in the lobby of the House of Commons.

== List of ministers ==
Office	Name	Date
First Lord of the Treasury; Leader of the House of Commons; Chancellor of the Exchequer; Chancellor of the Duchy of Lancaster	Spencer Perceval	4 Oct 1809 – 11 May 1812
Secretaries to the Treasury	Charles Arbuthnot (Note: Arbuthnot served as Senior Secretary.)	continued in office
Secretaries to the Treasury	Richard Wharton (Note: Wharton served as Junior Secretary.)	8 Dec 1809
Junior Lords of the Treasury	John Foster	6 Dec 1809 – 6 Jan 1812
Junior Lords of the Treasury	William Brodrick	6 Dec 1809 – 16 Jun 1812
Junior Lords of the Treasury	William Eliot	6 Dec 1809 – 6 Jan 1812
Junior Lords of the Treasury	John Otway Cuffe, 2nd Earl of Desart	6 Dec 1809 – 23 Jun 1810
Junior Lords of the Treasury	Snowdon Barne	6 Dec 1809 – 16 Jun 1812
Junior Lords of the Treasury	Berkeley Paget	23 Jun 1810 – 16 Jun 1812
Junior Lords of the Treasury	William Wellesley-Pole	6 Jan 1812 – 16 Jun 1812
Junior Lords of the Treasury	Richard Wellesley, 1st Marquess Wellesley	6 Jan 1812 – 16 Jun 1812
Lord Chancellor	John Scott, 1st Baron Eldon	continued in office
Lord President of the Council	John Pratt, 1st Earl Camden	continued in office
Lord President of the Council	Henry Addington, 1st Viscount Sidmouth	8 Apr 1812
Lord Privy Seal	John Fane, 10th Earl of Westmorland	continued in office
Home Secretary	Richard Ryder	1 Nov 1809
Under-Secretary of State for the Home Department	Charles Jenkinson	continued in office
Under-Secretary of State for the Home Department	Henry Goulburn	Feb 1810
Secretary of State for Foreign Affairs	Henry Bathurst, 3rd Earl Bathurst	11 Oct 1809
Secretary of State for Foreign Affairs	Richard Wellesley, 1st Marquess Wellesley	6 Dec 1809
Under-Secretary of State for Foreign Affairs	Charles Bagot	continued in office – Dec 1809
Under-Secretary of State for Foreign Affairs	Charles Culling Smith	Dec 1809 – Feb 1812
Under-Secretary of State for Foreign Affairs	Edward Cooke	Feb 1812 – Jun 1812
Secretary of State for War and the Colonies	Robert Jenkinson, 2nd Earl of Liverpool	1 Nov 1809
Under-Secretary of State for the Colonies	Edward Cooke	continued in office
Under-Secretary of State for the Colonies	Charles Jenkinson	2 Nov 1809
Under-Secretary of State for the Colonies	Robert Peel	10 Jun 1810
Under-Secretary of State for War	Frederick Robinson	continued in office
Under-Secretary of State for War	Henry Bunbury	2 Nov 1809
First Lord of the Admiralty	Henry Phipps, 3rd Baron Mulgrave	continued in office
First Lord of the Admiralty	Charles Philip Yorke	4 May 1810
First Lord of the Admiralty	The Viscount Melville	25 Mar 1812
First Secretary to the Admiralty	John Wilson Croker	12 Oct 1809
Civil Lords of the Admiralty	Robert Plumer Ward	continued in office – 17 Jun 1811
Civil Lords of the Admiralty	The Viscount Palmerston	continued in office – 24 Nov 1809
Civil Lords of the Admiralty	James Buller	continued in office – 25 Mar 1812
Civil Lords of the Admiralty	Viscount Lowther	24 Nov 1809 – 3 Jul 1810
Civil Lords of the Admiralty	Hon. F. J. Robinson	3 Jul 1810 – 16 Jun 1812
Civil Lords of the Admiralty	Lord Walpole	17 Jun 1811 – 16 Jun 1812
Civil Lords of the Admiralty	William Dundas	25 Mar 1812 – 16 Jun 1812
President of the Board of Trade	The Earl Bathurst	continued in office
Master of the Mint	The Earl Bathurst	continued in office
Vice-President of the Board of Trade	George Rose	continued in office
President of the Board of Control	The Earl of Harrowby	continued in office
President of the Board of Control	Hon. Robert Dundas (Note: Dundas succeeded as the 2nd Viscount Melville on 28 May 1811.)	13 Nov 1809
President of the Board of Control	The Earl of Buckinghamshire	7 Apr 1812
Secretary to the Board of Control	George Peter Holford	continued in office
Secretary to the Board of Control	Sir Patrick Murray	Jan 1810
Secretary to the Board of Control	John Bruce	Mar 1812
Master-General of the Ordnance	The Earl of Chatham	continued in office
Master-General of the Ordnance	Henry Phipps, 3rd Baron Mulgrave	5 May 1810
Lieutenant-General of the Ordnance	Sir Thomas Trigge	continued in office
Treasurer of the Ordnance	Joseph Hunt	continued in office
Treasurer of the Ordnance	Thomas Alcock	30 Jan 1810
Surveyor-General of the Ordnance	James Murray Hadden	continued in office
Surveyor-General of the Ordnance	Robert Moorsom	20 Jul 1810
Clerk of the Ordnance	Cropley Ashley-Cooper	continued in office
Clerk of the Ordnance	Robert Plumer Ward	14 Jun 1811
Clerk of the Deliveries of the Ordnance	Thomas Thoroton	continued in office
Storekeeper of the Ordnance	Mark Singleton	continued in office
Treasurer of the Navy	George Rose	continued in office
Secretary at War	Henry John Temple, 3rd Viscount Palmerston	continued in office
Paymaster of the Forces	Charles Long	continued in office
Paymaster of the Forces	Lord Charles Somerset	continued in office
Postmaster General	Thomas Pelham, 2nd Earl of Chichester	continued in office
Postmaster General	John Montagu, 5th Earl of Sandwich	continued in office
Surveyor General of Woods, Forests, Parks, and Chases (Note: Merged to form the Commissioners of Woods, Forests and Land Revenues.)	Sylvester Douglas, 1st Baron Glenbervie	continued in office – Jul 1810
First Commissioner of Woods and Forests	Sylvester Douglas, 1st Baron Glenbervie	Jul 1810
Ministers without Portfolio	William Cavendish-Bentinck, 3rd Duke of Portland	4 Oct 1809 – 30 Oct 1809
Ministers without Portfolio	Dudley Ryder, 1st Earl of Harrowby	Nov 1809 – Jun 1812
Ministers without Portfolio	John Pratt, 1st Earl Camden	8 Apr 1812 – Jun 1812
Lord Lieutenant of Ireland	Charles Lennox, 4th Duke of Richmond	continued in office
Chief Secretary for Ireland	William Wellesley-Pole	Oct 1809
Attorney General	Sir Vicary Gibbs	continued in office
Solicitor General	Sir Thomas Plumer	continued in office
Judge Advocate General	Charles Manners-Sutton	8 Nov 1809
Lord Advocate	Archibald Colquhoun	continued in office
Solicitor General for Scotland	David Boyle	continued in office
Solicitor General for Scotland	David Monypenny	22 Feb 1811
Attorney-General for Ireland	William Saurin	continued in office
Solicitor-General for Ireland	Charles Kendal Bushe	continued in office
Lord Steward of the Household	Heneage Finch, 4th Earl of Aylesford	continued in office
Lord Steward of the Household	George Cholmondeley, 4th Earl of Cholmondeley	19 Feb 1812
Treasurer of the Household	James Stopford, Viscount Stopford (Note: Stopford succeeded as the 3rd Earl of Courtown on 30 March 1810.)	continued in office
Treasurer of the Household	Robert Jocelyn, Viscount Jocelyn	8 May 1812
Comptroller of the Household	Lord George Thynne	continued in office
Lord Chamberlain of the Household	George Legge, 3rd Earl of Dartmouth	continued in office
Lord Chamberlain of the Household	vacant (Note: Upon the death of Dartmouth.)	10 Nov 1810
Lord Chamberlain of the Household	Francis Ingram-Seymour-Conway, 2nd Marquess of Hertford	7 Mar 1812
Vice-Chamberlain of the Household	Lord John Thynne	continued in office
Vice-Chamberlain of the Household	Francis Seymour-Conway, Earl of Yarmouth	14 Mar 1812
Master of the Horse	James Graham, 3rd Duke of Montrose	continued in office
Master of the Buckhounds	Charles Cornwallis, 2nd Marquess Cornwallis	continued in office
Captain of the Gentlemen Pensioners	Richard Edgcumbe, 2nd Earl of Mount Edgcumbe	continued in office
Captain of the Gentlemen Pensioners	James Stopford, 3rd Earl of Courtown	26 Mar 1812
Captain of the Yeomen of the Guard	George Parker, 4th Earl of Macclesfield	continued in office

== Notes ==
Preceded by Second Portland ministry	Government of the United Kingdom; 1809–1812	Succeeded by Liverpool ministry
