= Second Portland ministry =

Members of the government of the United Kingdom from 1807–1809

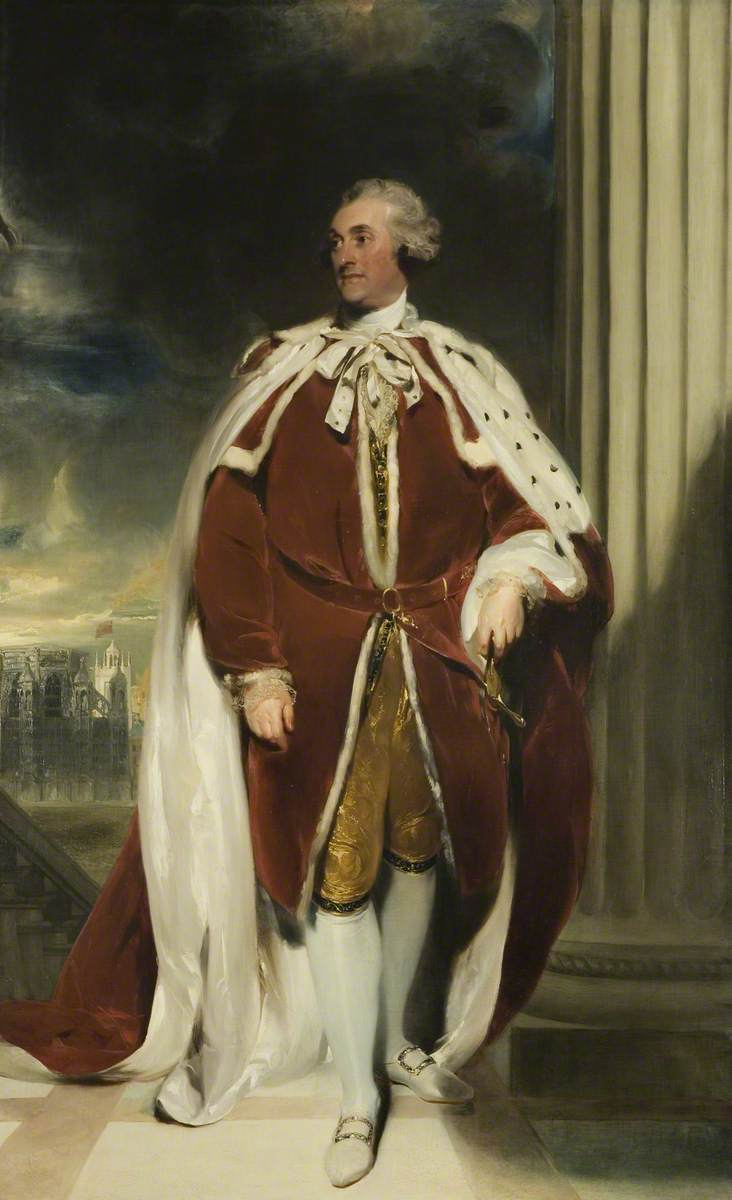
Portrait of the Duke of Portland by Thomas Lawrence, 1792. The Duke of Portland was the figurehead of the government, but exercised comparatively little power over his colleagues.

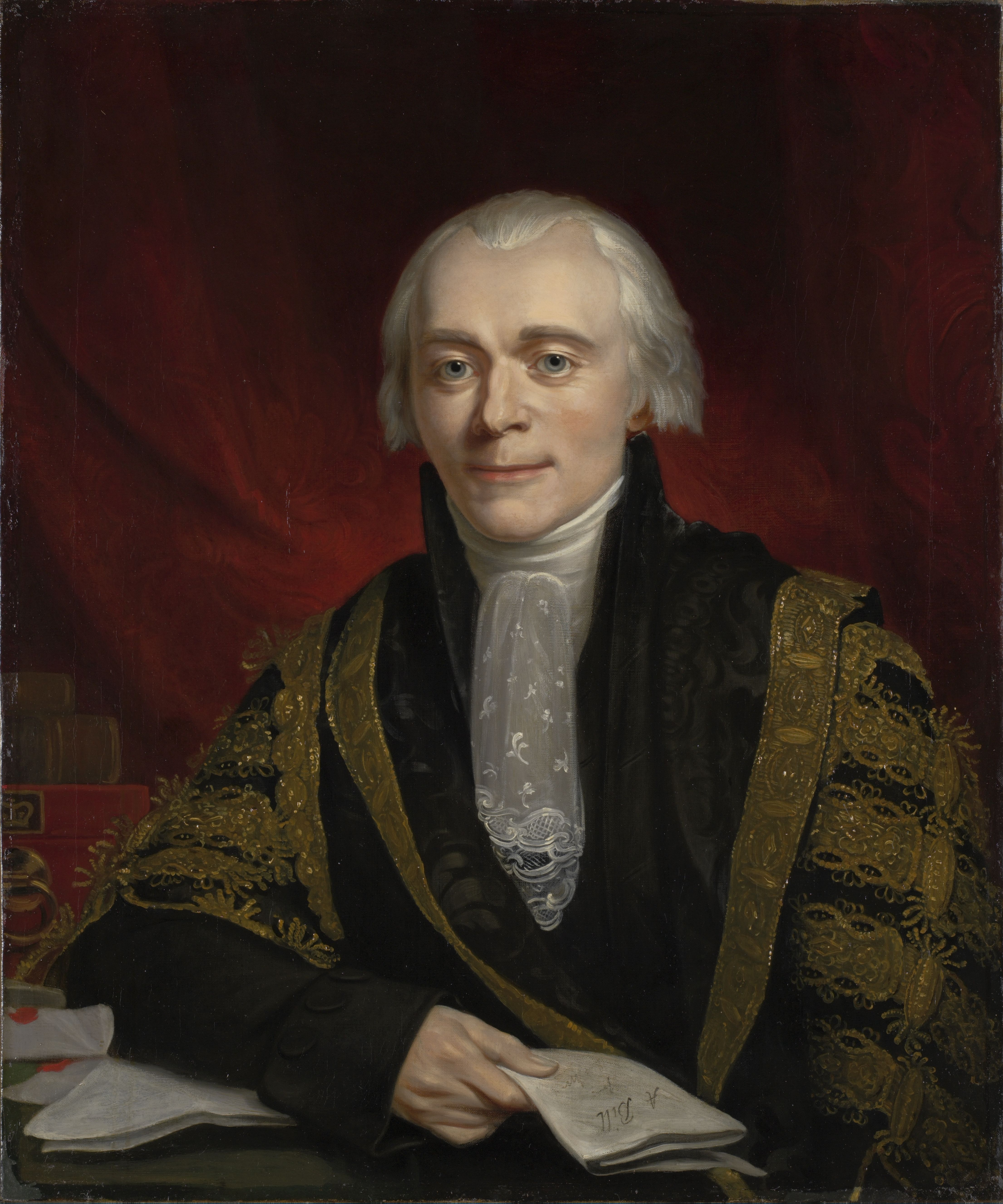
Spencer Perceval served as Chancellor of the Exchequer and succeeded Portland in 1809. He was subsequently assassinated in 1812, the only British Prime Minister to be killed in office.

This is a list of members of the Tory government of the United Kingdom in office under the leadership of William Cavendish-Bentinck, 3rd Duke of Portland from 1807 to 1809.

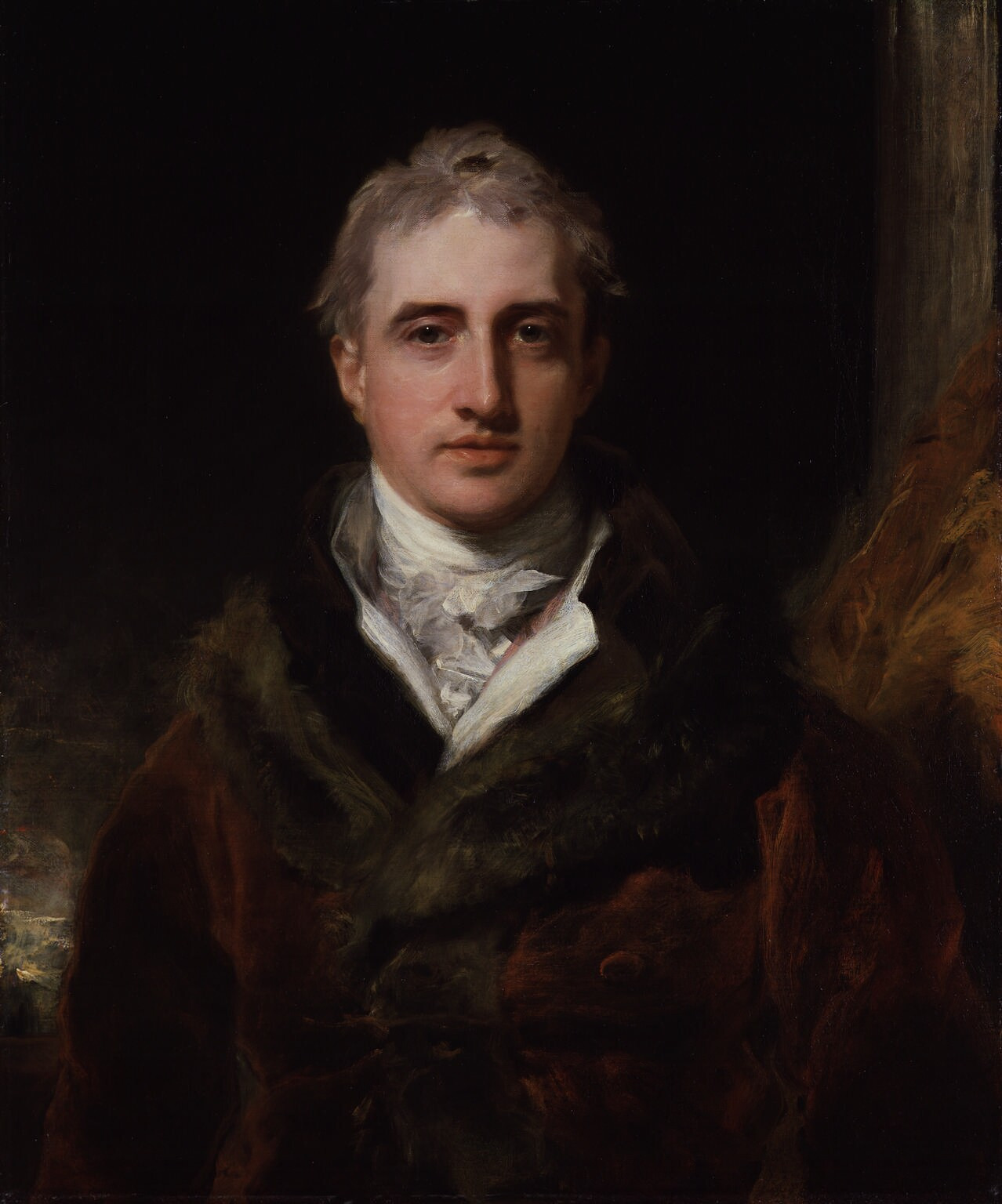
Portrait of Lord Castlereagh by Thomas Lawrence 1809. Viscount Castlereagh served as Secretary for War until his resignation and duel with his colleague George Canning.

Members of the Cabinet are in bold face.

Office	Name		Date
First Lord of the Treasury	**William Cavendish-Bentinck, 3rd Duke of Portland**		31 March 1807 – 4 October 1809
Chancellor of the Exchequer; Chancellor of the Duchy of Lancaster	**Spencer Perceval**		26 March 1807; 30 March 1807 –
Secretaries to the Treasury	Senior Secretary	Hon. Henry Wellesley	1 April 1807 – 21 March 1809
Secretaries to the Treasury	Senior Secretary	Charles Arbuthnot	5 April 1809
Secretaries to the Treasury	Junior Secretary	William Huskisson	1 April 1807
Junior Lords of the Treasury	William Cavendish-Scott-Bentinck, Marquess of Titchfield		31 March 1807 – 16 September 1807
Junior Lords of the Treasury	Hon. William Eliot		31 March 1807
Junior Lords of the Treasury	William Sturges Bourne		31 March 1807 – 16 September 1807
Junior Lords of the Treasury	John Foster		16 September 1807
Junior Lords of the Treasury	Hon. Richard Ryder		16 September 1807 – 2 December 1807
Junior Lords of the Treasury	Hon. William Brodrick		2 December 1807
Junior Lords of the Treasury	Snowdon Barne		2 December 1807
Lord President of the Council	**John Pratt, 1st Earl Camden**		26 March 1807
Lord Chancellor	**John Scott, 1st Baron Eldon**		1 April 1807
Home Secretary	**Robert Jenkinson, Baron Hawkesbury**		25 March 1807
Under-Secretary of State for the Home Department	Charles Watkin Williams-Wynn		continued in office
Under-Secretary of State for the Home Department	Charles Jenkinson		November 1807
Secretary of State for Foreign Affairs	**George Canning**		25 March 1807
Under-Secretary of State for Foreign Affairs	James Harris, Viscount FitzHarris		March 1807
Under-Secretary of State for Foreign Affairs	Charles Bagot		August 1807
President of the Board of Trade; Master of the Mint	**Henry Bathurst, 3rd Earl Bathurst**		26 March 1807; 25 April 1807
Vice-President of the Board of Trade	George Rose		March 1807
Secretary of State for War and the Colonies	**Robert Stewart, Viscount Castlereagh**		25 March 1807
Under-Secretary of State for War and the Colonies	Edward Cooke		1807
Under-Secretary of State for War and the Colonies	Charles Stewart		1807
Under-Secretary of State for War and the Colonies	Frederick Robinson		1809
President of the Board of Control	Robert Saunders-Dundas		6 April 1807
President of the Board of Control	**Dudley Ryder, 1st Earl of Harrowby**		17 July 1809
Secretary to the Board of Control	George Peter Holford		continued in office
First Lord of the Admiralty	**Henry Phipps, 2nd Baron Mulgrave**		4 April 1807
First Secretary to the Admiralty	William Wellesley-Pole		1807
Civil Lords of the Admiralty	Robert Plumer Ward		6 April 1807
Civil Lords of the Admiralty	Henry John Temple, 3rd Viscount Palmerston		6 April 1807
Civil Lords of the Admiralty	James Buller		6 April 1807
Lord Privy Seal	**John Fane, 10th Earl of Westmorland**		25 March 1807
Master-General of the Ordnance	**John Pitt, 2nd Earl of Chatham**		4 April 1807
Lieutenant-General of the Ordnance	Sir Thomas Trigge		continued in office
Treasurer of the Ordnance	Joseph Hunt		continued in office
Surveyor-General of the Ordnance	James Murray Hadden		continued in office
Clerk of the Ordnance	William Wellesley-Pole		7 April 1807
Clerk of the Ordnance	Cropley Ashley-Cooper		29 July 1807
Clerk of the Deliveries of the Ordnance	Cropley Ashley-Cooper		7 April 1807
Clerk of the Deliveries of the Ordnance	Thomas Thoroton		29 July 1807
Storekeeper of the Ordnance	Mark Singleton		7 April 1807
Treasurer of the Navy	George Rose		15 April 1807
Secretary at War	Sir James Pulteney, 7th Baronet		30 March 1807
Secretary at War	**Lord Granville Leveson-Gower**		27 June 1809
Paymaster of the Forces	Charles Long		April 1807
Paymaster of the Forces	Lord Charles Henry Somerset		April 1807
Postmaster General	Thomas Pelham, 2nd Earl of Chichester		1807
Postmaster General	John Montagu, 5th Earl of Sandwich		1807
Surveyor General of Woods, Forests, Parks, and Chases	Sylvester Douglas, 1st Baron Glenbervie		1807
Ministers without Portfolio	**William Cavendish-Bentinck, 3rd Duke of Portland**		4 October 1809 – 30 October 1809
Ministers without Portfolio	**Dudley Ryder, 1st Earl of Harrowby**		November 1809 – June 1812
Ministers without Portfolio	**John Pratt, 1st Earl Camden**		8 April 1812 – June 1812
Lord Lieutenant of Ireland	Charles Lennox, 4th Duke of Richmond		April 1807
Chief Secretary for Ireland	Sir Arthur Wellesley		April 1807
Chief Secretary for Ireland	Robert Saunders-Dundas		April 1809
Attorney General	Sir Vicary Gibbs		April 1807
Solicitor General	Sir Thomas Plumer		April 1807
Judge Advocate General	Nathaniel Bond		8 March 1806
Judge Advocate General	Richard Ryder		4 December 1807
Lord Advocate	Archibald Colquhoun		1807
Solicitor General for Scotland	David Boyle		1807
Attorney General for Ireland	William Saurin		15 May 1807
Solicitor General for Ireland	Charles Kendal Bushe		continued in office
Lord Steward of the Household	Heneage Finch, 4th Earl of Aylesford		continued in office
Treasurer of the Household	James Stopford, Viscount Stopford		1807
Comptroller of the Household	Lord George Thynne		continued in office
Lord Chamberlain of the Household	George Legge, 3rd Earl of Dartmouth		continued in office
Vice-Chamberlain of the Household	Lord John Thynne		continued in office
Master of the Horse	James Graham, 3rd Duke of Montrose		1807
Master of the Buckhounds	Charles Cornwallis, 2nd Marquess Cornwallis		continued in office
Captain of the Gentlemen Pensioners	St Andrew St John, 14th Baron St John of Bletso		continued in office
Captain of the Gentlemen Pensioners	Richard Edgcumbe, 2nd Earl of Mount Edgcumbe		2 March 1808
Captain of the Yeomen of the Guard	George Parker, 4th Earl of Macclesfield		continued in office

Preceded by Ministry of All the Talents	Government of the United Kingdom; 1807–1809	Succeeded by Perceval ministry
