= Pitt–Tierney duel =

1798 duel in England

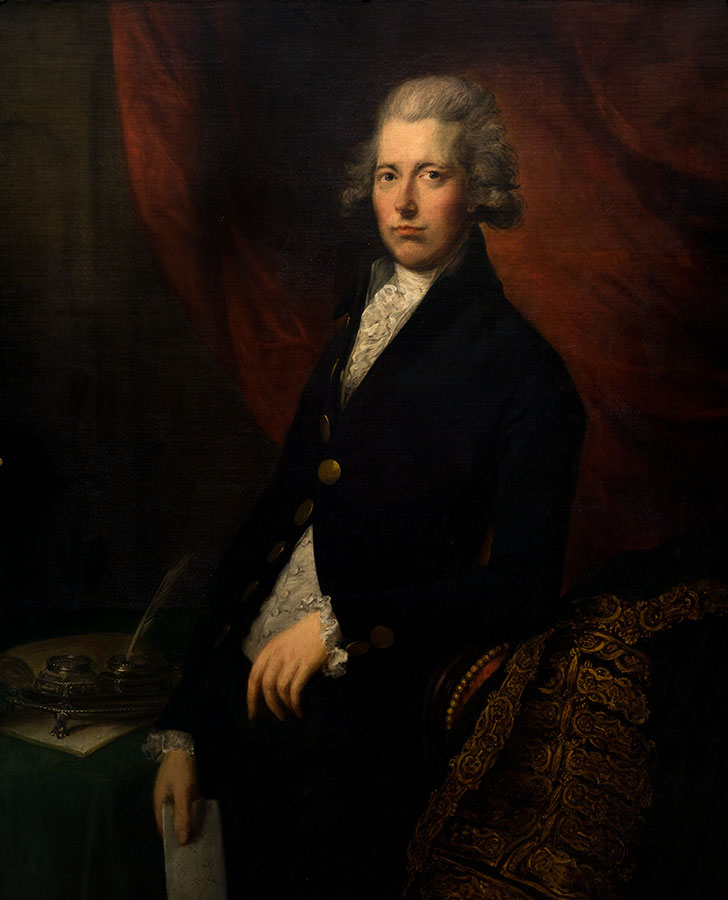
William Pitt the Younger, the prime minister since 1783.

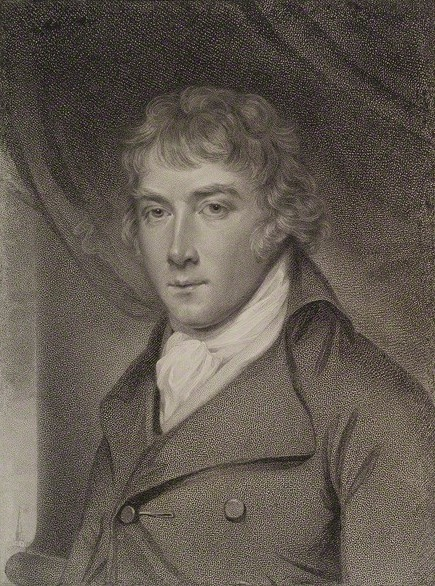
George Tierney, a prominent member of the Whig opposition.

The Pitt–Tierney Duel took place on 27 May 1798 when the prime minister of Great Britain William Pitt the Younger met his political opponent George Tierney in a duel with pistols on Putney Heath outside London.

== Background ==
Pitt had been prime minister since 1783 and from 1793 had led the country during the French Revolutionary War. Tierney was a Whig opposition figure associated with Charles James Fox and the radical wing of the opposition Whig Party. During a debate in the House of Commons, Pitt had been proposing a new measure to increase the manpower of the Royal Navy. Tierney, in the absence of Fox acting as the resident leader of the Foxite Whigs, suggested a longer consideration of the bill. Pitt, frustrated by this move, had suggested Tierney's attitude came from a "desire to obstruct the defence of the country". When Tierney protested and appealed to the Speaker, who asked Pitt to explain himself, Pitt refused to withdraw this remark. The next day Pitt received a call from Major-General George Walpole, acting in his capacity as Tierney's second, with a challenge to a duel. Pitt accepted at once. Pitt asked the Speaker, Henry Addington, to be his second but he refused. He next sought Thomas Steele to be his second, but, when Steele could not be contacted, Dudley Ryder agreed to act.

== Duel ==
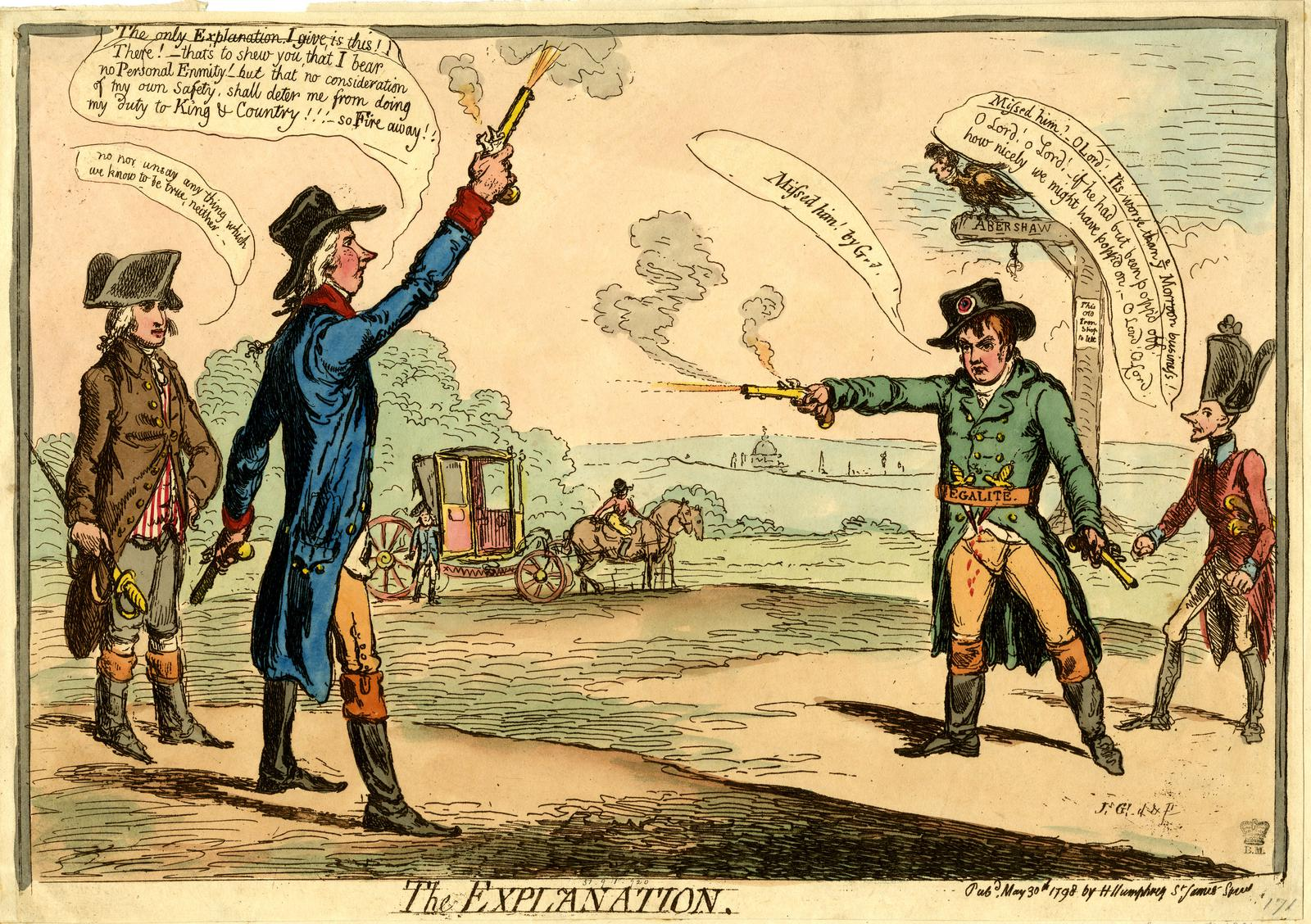
A print by James Gillray caricaturing the participants in the duel.

The two politicians met by arrangement on Putney Heath, then in Surrey several miles outside London. Armed with pistols, both men took aim at twelve paces and missed. When it came to take a second shot, Pitt deliberately aimed in the air. The Times reported "the seconds then jointly interfered, and insisted the matter should go no further, it being their decided opinion that sufficient satisfaction had been given, and that the business was ended with perfect honour to both parties.

== Aftermath ==
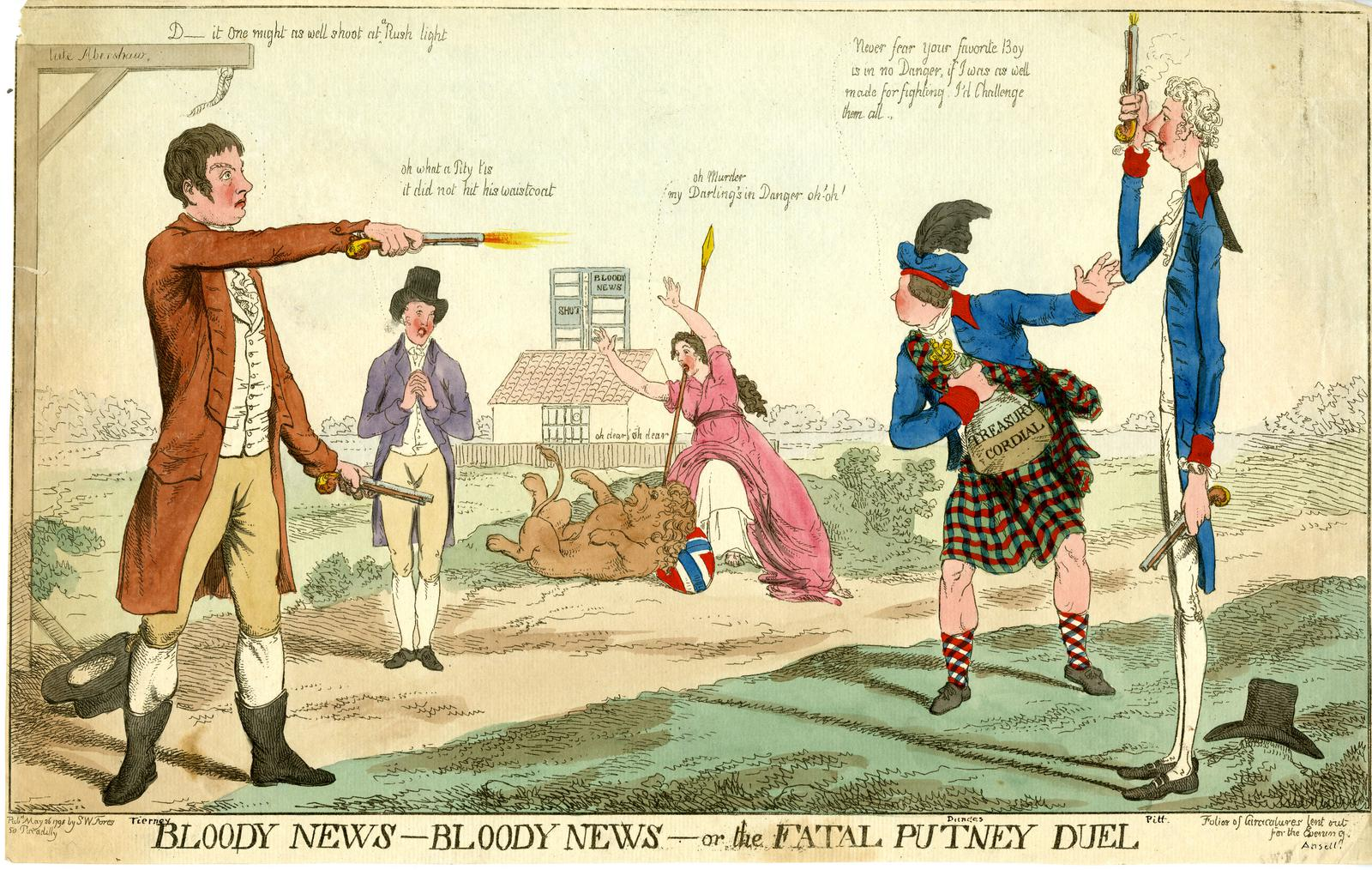
A satirical print of the duel by Charles Williams.

The reaction to the duel was mixed. A general attitude was of amusement, with one commentator suggesting "never did two men meet more ignorant of the use of their weapons". Notable amongst this was a cartoon by the satirist James Gillray. Others took the bloodless duel more seriously. Pitt's friend and political ally William Wilberforce was upset both because Pitt might have lost his life but also because he strongly opposed duelling. He had to be persuaded not to move a motion in the House of Commons condemning duelling. King George III was enraged and dismayed upon learning of the incident and reminded Pitt that as prime minister, he should have prioritized the interests of the nation over personal considerations.

== See also ==
- Castlereagh–Canning duel, an 1809 duel between two of Pitt's protégées also fought on Putney Heath

== Biography ==
- Alter, J-M (2024). A New Biography of William Pitt the Younger-Volume 1- Years of Establishment 1759-1798. Independent}. ISBN 979-8333204790.
- Banks, Stephen. A Polite Exchange of Bullets: The Duel and the English Gentleman, 1750-1850. Boydell & Brewer, 2010.
- John Ehrman. The Younger Pitt. The Consuming Struggle. Constable, 1996.
- Hague, William. William Pitt the Younger: A Biography. HarperCollins UK, 2012.
- Hochschild, Adam. Bury the Chains: Prophets and Rebels in the Fight to Free an Empire's Slaves. Houghton Mifflin Harcourt, 2006.
- Jarrett, Nathaniel. The Lion at Dawn: Forging British Strategy in the Age of the French Revolution, 1783–1797'. University of Oklahoma Press, 2022.
- Shoemaker, Robert. The London Mob: Violence and Disorder in Eighteenth-Century England. A&C Black, 2007.
