= First Pitt ministry =

Government from 1783 to 1801 led by William Pitt the Younger

- 1783–1801
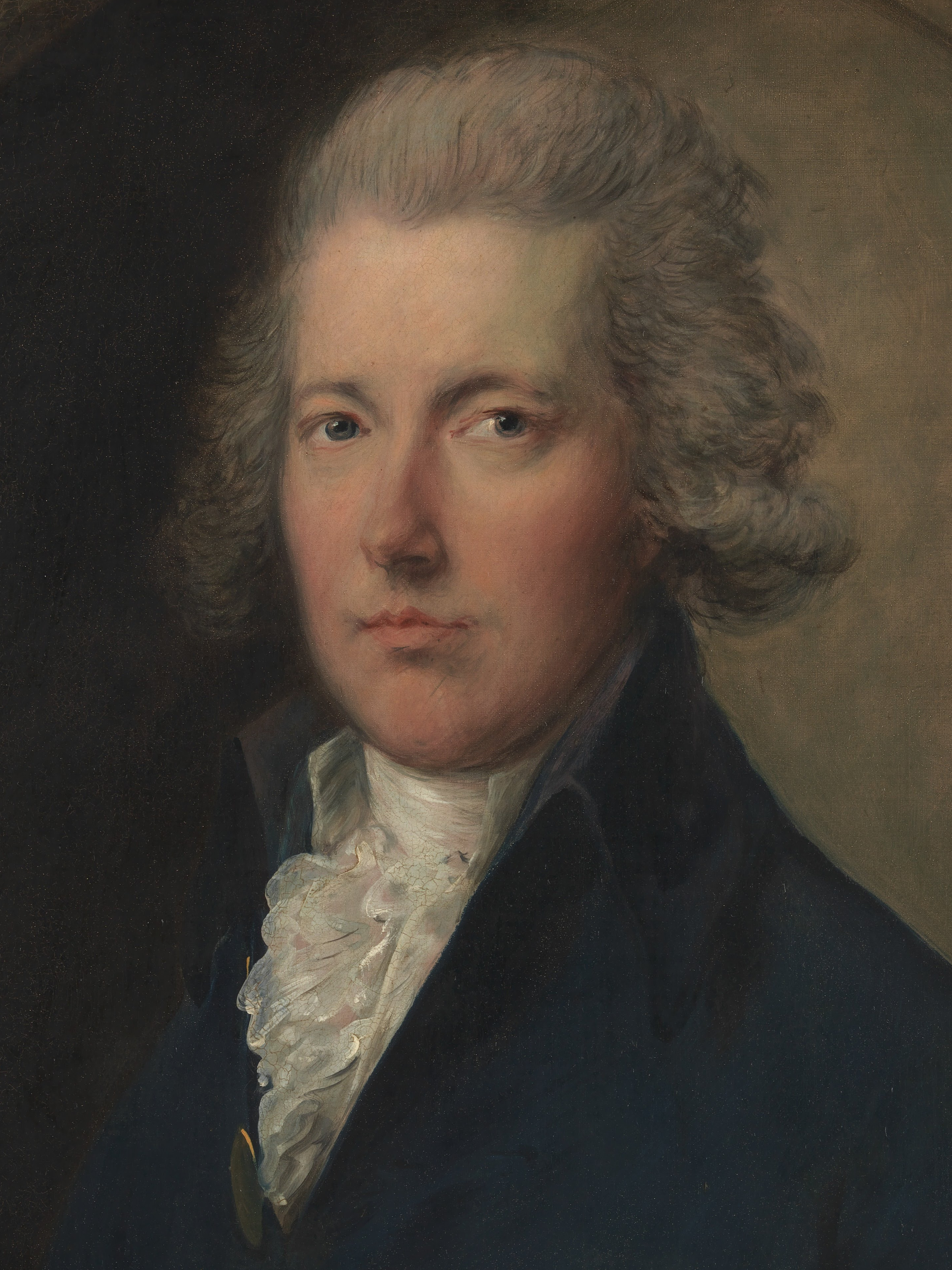
- Pitt by Thomas Gainsborough
- Date formed: 19 December 1783
- Date dissolved: 14 March 1801

People and organisations
- Monarch: George III
- Prime Minister: William Pitt the Younger
- Total no. of members: 38 appointments
- Member parties: Tory Party; Whig Party (1794–1801)
- Status in legislature: Minority (1783–1784); Majority (1784–1794); Majority (coalition) (1794–1801)
- Opposition party: Whig Party (1783–1794); Foxites (1794–1801)
- Opposition leaders: Charles James Fox; George Tierney (1797–1801)

History
- Elections: 1784 general election; 1790 general election; 1796 general election
- Outgoing election: 1801 co-option
- Legislature terms: 15th GB Parliament lost a vote of confidence; 16th GB Parliament; 17th GB Parliament; 18th GB Parliament; 1st UK Parliament
- Predecessor: Fox–North coalition
- Successor: Addington ministry

The First Pitt Ministry was the term of office from 1783–1801 during which William Pitt the Younger served as the last prime minister of Great Britain from 1783 until the Acts of Union 1800, and the first official prime minister of the United Kingdom from January 1801 until he left office in March 1801. He was also Chancellor of the Exchequer for all his time as prime minister. His 1783-1801 term is known as the First Pitt Ministry because he would serve again as Prime Minister from 1804 until his death in 1806. He is known as "Pitt the Younger" to distinguish him from his father, William Pitt the Elder, who had also previously served as prime minister from 1766-1768.

In 1800, the Acts of Union between Great Britain and Ireland were accepted by their respective parliaments, creating the new United Kingdom of Great Britain and Ireland (UK), which would be governed by the former Parliament of Great Britain (now the UK Parliament). Pitt governed this new state for the first month of its existence, until he resigned due to differences with King George III over Catholic emancipation, which Pitt had come to favor but the King vehemently opposed.

== Rise to power ==
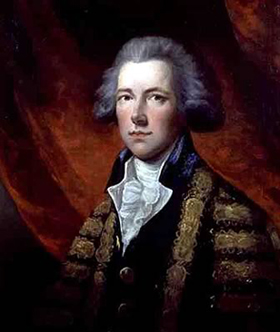
- First premiership of Pitt the Younger; 19 December 1783 – 14 March 1801
- Monarch: George III
- Cabinet: First Pitt ministry
- Party: Tory
- Seat: 10 Downing Street
- Coat of arms of HM Government

The Fox–North Coalition fell in December 1783, after Fox had introduced Edmund Burke's bill to reform the East India Company to gain the patronage he so greatly lacked while the King refused to support him. Fox stated the bill was necessary to save the company from bankruptcy. Pitt responded that: "Necessity is the plea for every infringement of human freedom. It is the argument of tyrants; it is the creed of slaves." The king was opposed to the bill; when it passed in the House of Commons, he secured its defeat in the House of Lords by threatening to regard anyone who voted for it as his enemy. Following the bill's failure in the Upper House, George III dismissed the coalition government and finally entrusted the premiership to William Pitt, after having offered the position to him three times previously.

=== Appointment ===
A constitutional crisis arose when the king dismissed the Fox–North coalition government and named Pitt to replace it. Though faced with a hostile majority in Parliament, Pitt was able to solidify his position within a few months. Some historians argue that his success was inevitable given the decisive importance of monarchical power; others argue that the king gambled on Pitt and that both would have failed but for a run of good fortune.

Pitt, at the age of 24, became Great Britain's youngest prime minister ever. The contemporary satire The Rolliad ridiculed him for his youth:

Above the rest, majestically great,
Behold the infant Atlas of the state,
The matchless miracle of modern days,
In whom Britannia to the world displays
A sight to make surrounding nations stare;
A kingdom trusted to a school-boy's care.

Many saw Pitt as a stop-gap appointment until some more senior statesman took on the role. However, although it was widely predicted that the new "mince-pie administration" would not outlast the Christmas season, it survived for seventeen years.

So as to reduce the power of the Opposition, Pitt offered Charles James Fox and his allies posts in the Cabinet; Pitt's refusal to include Lord North, however, thwarted his efforts. The new government was immediately on the defensive and in January 1784 was defeated on a motion of no confidence. Pitt, however, took the unprecedented step of refusing to resign, despite this defeat. He retained the support of the king, who would not entrust the reins of power to the Fox–North Coalition. He also received the support of the House of Lords, which passed supportive motions, and many messages of support from the country at large, in the form of petitions approving of his appointment which influenced some MPs to switch their support to Pitt. At the same time, he was granted the Freedom of the City of London. When he returned from the ceremony to mark this, men of the City pulled Pitt's coach home themselves, as a sign of respect. When passing a Whig club, the coach came under attack from a group of men who tried to assault Pitt. When news of this spread, it was assumed Fox and his associates had tried to bring down Pitt by any means.

=== Electoral victory ===
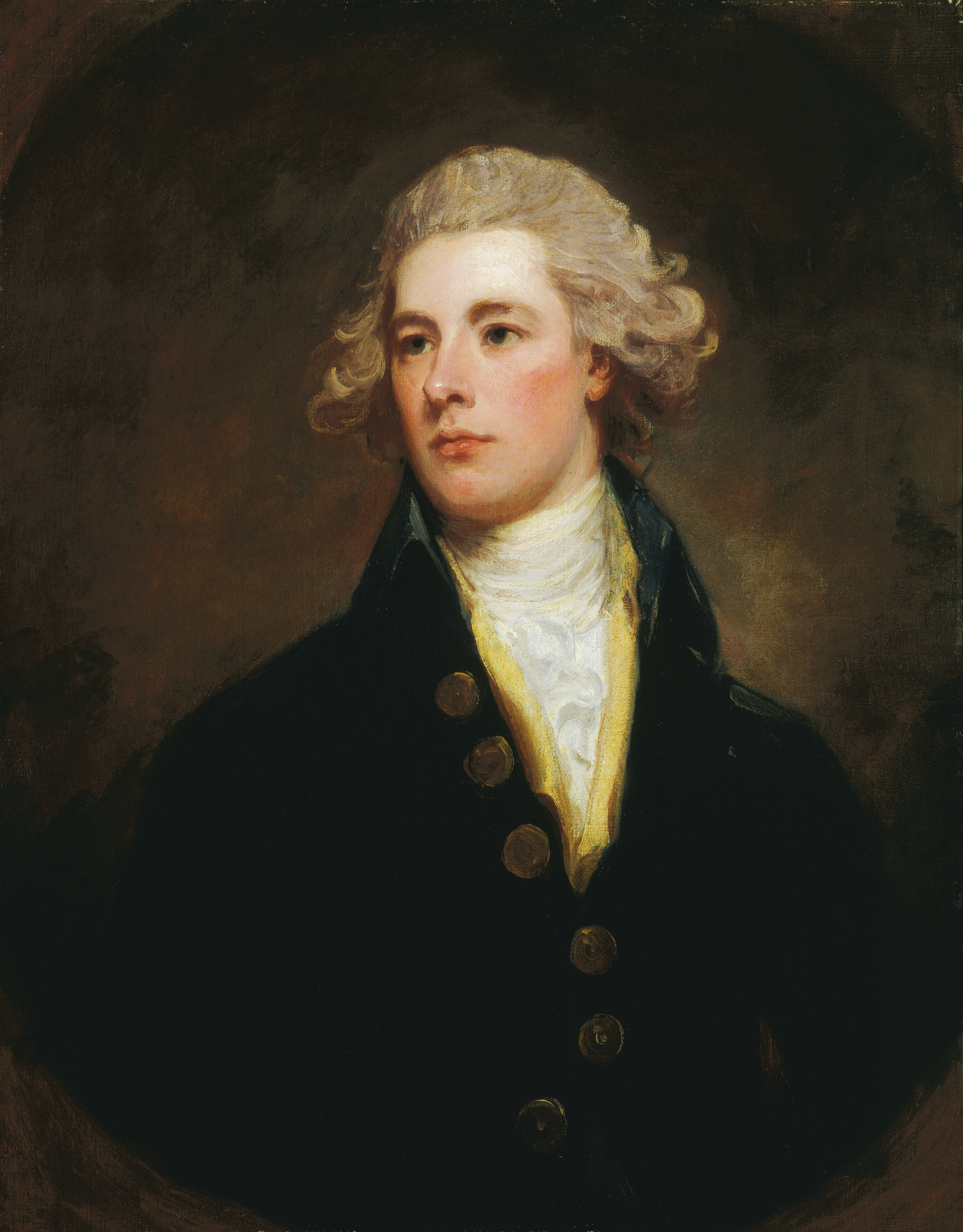
William Pitt in 1783, by George Romney

Pitt gained great popularity with the public at large as "Honest Billy" who was seen as a refreshing change from the dishonesty, corruption and lack of principles widely associated with both Fox and North. Despite a series of defeats in the House of Commons, Pitt defiantly remained in office, watching the Coalition's majority shrink as some Members of Parliament left the Opposition to abstain.

In March 1784 Parliament was dissolved, and a general election ensued. An electoral defeat for the government was out of the question because Pitt enjoyed the support of George III. Patronage and bribes paid by HM Treasury were normally expected to be enough to secure the government a comfortable majority in the House of Commons, but on this occasion, the government reaped much popular support as well. In most popular constituencies, the election was fought between candidates clearly representing either Pitt or Fox and North. Early returns showed a massive swing to Pitt with the result that many Opposition Members who still had not faced election either defected, stood down, or made deals with their opponents to avoid expensive defeats.

A notable exception came in Fox's own constituency of Westminster, which contained one of the largest electorates in the country. In a contest estimated to have cost a quarter of the total spending in the entire country, Fox bitterly fought against two Pittite candidates to secure one of the two seats for the constituency. Great legal wranglings ensued, including the examination of every single vote cast, which dragged on for more than a year. Meanwhile, Fox sat for the Scottish pocket borough of Tain Burghs. Many saw the dragging out of the result as being unduly vindictive on the part of Pitt and eventually the examinations were abandoned with Fox declared elected. Elsewhere, Pitt won a personal triumph when he was elected a member for Cambridge University, a constituency he had long coveted and which he would continue to represent for the remainder of his life. Pitt's new constituency suited him perfectly as he was able to act independently. Sir James Lowther's pocket borough of Appleby, which had been Pitt's previous constituency, had strings attached. Now Pitt could really be the 'independent Whig' he identified as.

== First government ==
In domestic politics, Pitt concerned himself with the cause of parliamentary reform. In 1785 he introduced a bill to remove the representation of thirty-six rotten and pocket boroughs, and to extend, in a small way, the electoral franchise to more individuals. Pitt's support for the bill, however, was not strong enough to prevent its defeat in the Commons. The bill of 1785 was the last parliamentary reform proposal introduced by Pitt to British legislators.

=== Colonial reform ===
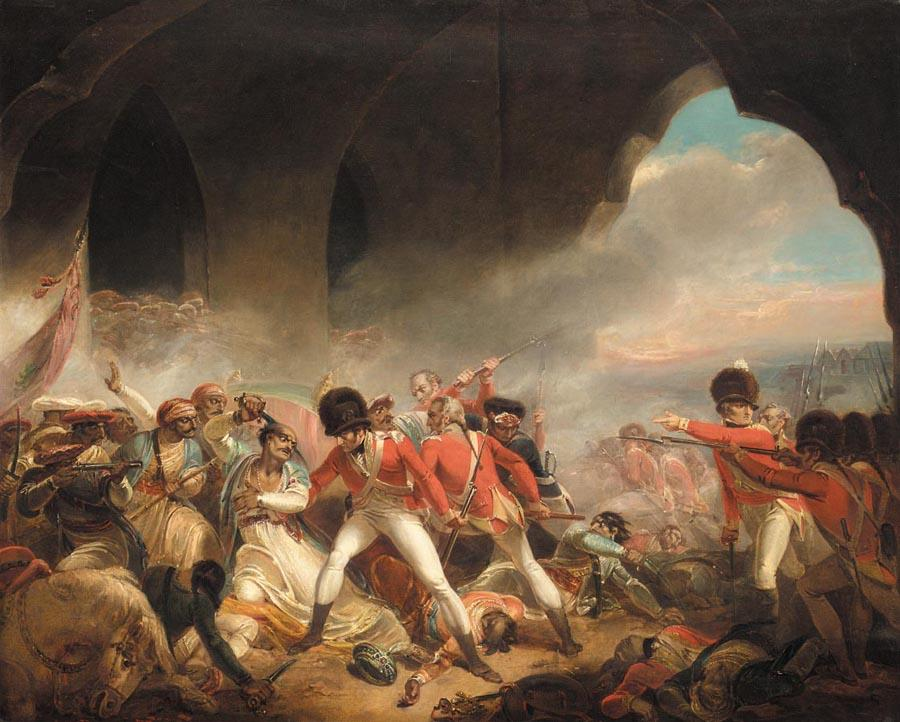
The Last Effort and Fall of Tippoo Sultaun by Henry Singleton. The defeat of Tipu Sultan and the Sultanate of Mysore in 1799

His administration secure, Pitt could begin to enact his agenda. His first major piece of legislation as prime minister was the India Act 1784, which re-organised the British East India Company and kept a watch over corruption. The India Act created a new Board of Control to oversee the affairs of the East India Company. It differed from Fox's failed India Bill 1783 and specified that the board would be appointed by the King. Pitt was appointed, along with Lord Sydney, who was appointed president. The act centralised British rule in India by reducing the power of the governors of Bombay and Madras and by increasing that of Governor-General Charles Cornwallis. Further augmentations and clarifications of the governor-general's authority were made in 1786, presumably by Lord Sydney, and presumably as a result of the company's setting up of Penang with their own superintendent (governor), Captain Francis Light, in 1786.

Convicts were originally transported to the Thirteen Colonies in North America, but after the American War of Independence ended in 1783, the newly formed United States refused to accept further convicts. Pitt's government took the decision to settle what is now Australia and found the penal colony in August 1786. The First Fleet of 11 vessels carried over a thousand settlers, including 778 convicts. The Colony of New South Wales was formally proclaimed by Governor Arthur Phillip on 7 February 1788 at Sydney.

=== Finances ===
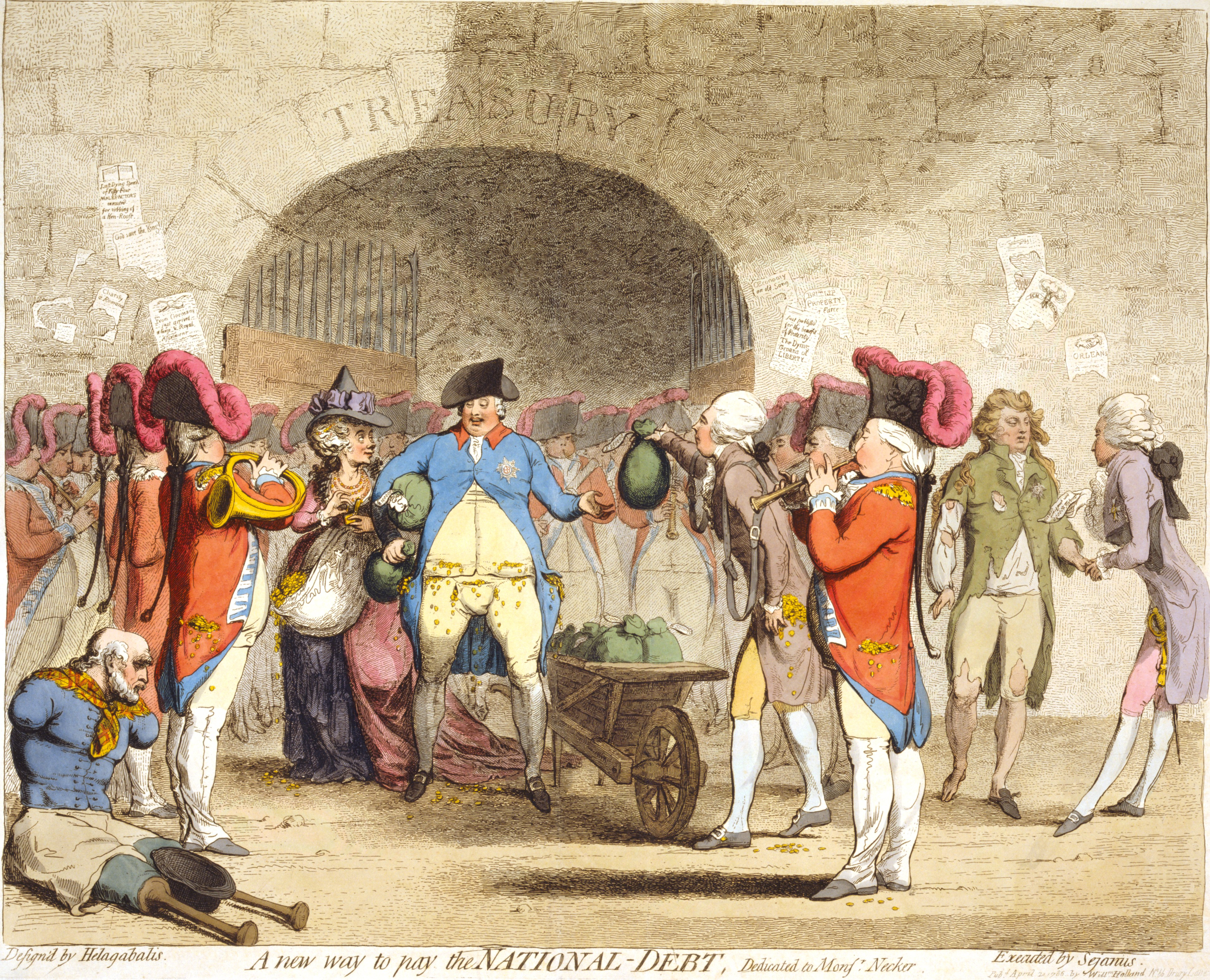
In "A new way to pay the National Debt" (1786), James Gillray caricatured Queen Charlotte and George III awash with treasury funds to cover royal debts, with Pitt handing them another moneybag.

Another important domestic issue with which Pitt had to concern himself was the national debt, which had doubled to £243 million during the American war. (Note: about £45 billion today) Every year, a third of the budget of £24 million went to pay interest. Pitt sought to reduce the national debt by imposing new taxes. In 1786, he instituted a sinking fund so that £1 million a year was added to a fund so that it could accumulate interest; eventually, the money in the fund was to be used to pay off the national debt. Pitt had learned of the idea of the 'Sinking Fund' from his father in 1772. Earl Chatham had been informed of the Welshman, Sir Richard Price's idea, Pitt approved of the idea and adopted it when he was in office. By 1792, the debt had fallen to £170 million. (Note: about £24 billion today)

Pitt always paid careful attention to financial issues. A fifth of Britain's imports were smuggled in without paying taxes. He made it easier for honest merchants to import goods by lowering tariffs on easily smuggled items such as tea, wine, spirits, and tobacco. This policy raised customs revenues by nearly £2 million a year. (Note: about £261 million today)

In 1797 Pitt was forced to protect the kingdom's gold reserves by preventing individuals from exchanging banknotes for gold. Great Britain would continue to use paper money for over two decades. Pitt also introduced Great Britain's first-ever income tax. The new tax helped offset losses in indirect tax revenue, which had been caused by a decline in trade. Pitt's two policies of suspending cash payments and introducing Income Tax were later cited by the French Minister of Finance as being 'genius', as they had stopped the French from destroying Britain's economy.

=== Foreign affairs ===
Pitt sought European alliances to restrict French influence, forming the Triple Alliance with Prussia and the Dutch Republic in 1788. During the Nootka Sound Controversy in 1790, Pitt took advantage of the alliance to force Spain to give up its claim to exclusive control over the western coast of North and South America. The Alliance, however, failed to produce any other important benefits for Great Britain.

Pitt was alarmed at Russian expansion in the 1780s at the expense of the Ottoman Empire. The relations between Russia and Britain were disturbed during the Russo-Turkish War of 1787–1792 by Pitt's subscription to the view of the Prussian government that the Triple Alliance could not with impunity allow the balance of power in Eastern Europe to be disturbed. In peace talks with the Ottomans, Russia refused to return the key Ochakov fortress. Pitt wanted to threaten military retaliation. However Russia's ambassador Semyon Vorontsov organised Pitt's enemies and launched a public opinion campaign. Pitt had become alarmed at the opposition to his Russian policy in Parliament, Edmund Burke and Fox both uttering powerful speeches against the restoration of Ochakov to the Turks. Pitt won the vote so narrowly that he gave up. The outbreak of the French Revolution and its attendant wars temporarily united Britain and Russia in an ideological alliance against French republicanism.

=== The King's condition ===
In 1788 Pitt faced a major crisis when George III fell victim to a mysterious illness, (Note: The consensus view among historians is that the king was suffering from the blood disorder porphyria, which was unknown at this time. If protracted and untreated, it has serious mentally debilitating effects.) a form of mental disorder that incapacitated him. If the sovereign was incapable of fulfilling his constitutional duties, Parliament would need to appoint a regent to rule in his place. All factions agreed that the only viable candidate was the king's eldest son and heir apparent, George, Prince of Wales. The Prince, however, was a supporter of Fox. Had the Prince come to power, he would almost surely have dismissed Pitt. He did not have such an opportunity, however, as Parliament spent months debating legal technicalities relating to the regency. Fortunately for Pitt, the King recovered in February 1789, just after a Regency Bill had been introduced and passed in the Commons.

The general elections of 1790 resulted in a majority for the government, and Pitt continued as prime minister. In 1791, he proceeded to address one of the problems facing the growing British Empire: the future of British Canada. By the Constitutional Act of 1791, the province of Quebec was divided into two separate provinces: the predominantly French Lower Canada and the predominantly English Upper Canada. In August 1792, coincident with the capture of Louis XVI by the French revolutionaries, George III appointed Pitt as Lord Warden of the Cinque Ports, a position whose incumbent was responsible for the coastal defences of the realm. The King had in 1791 offered him a Knighthood of the Garter, but he suggested the honour should go to his elder brother, the second Earl of Chatham.

=== French Revolution ===
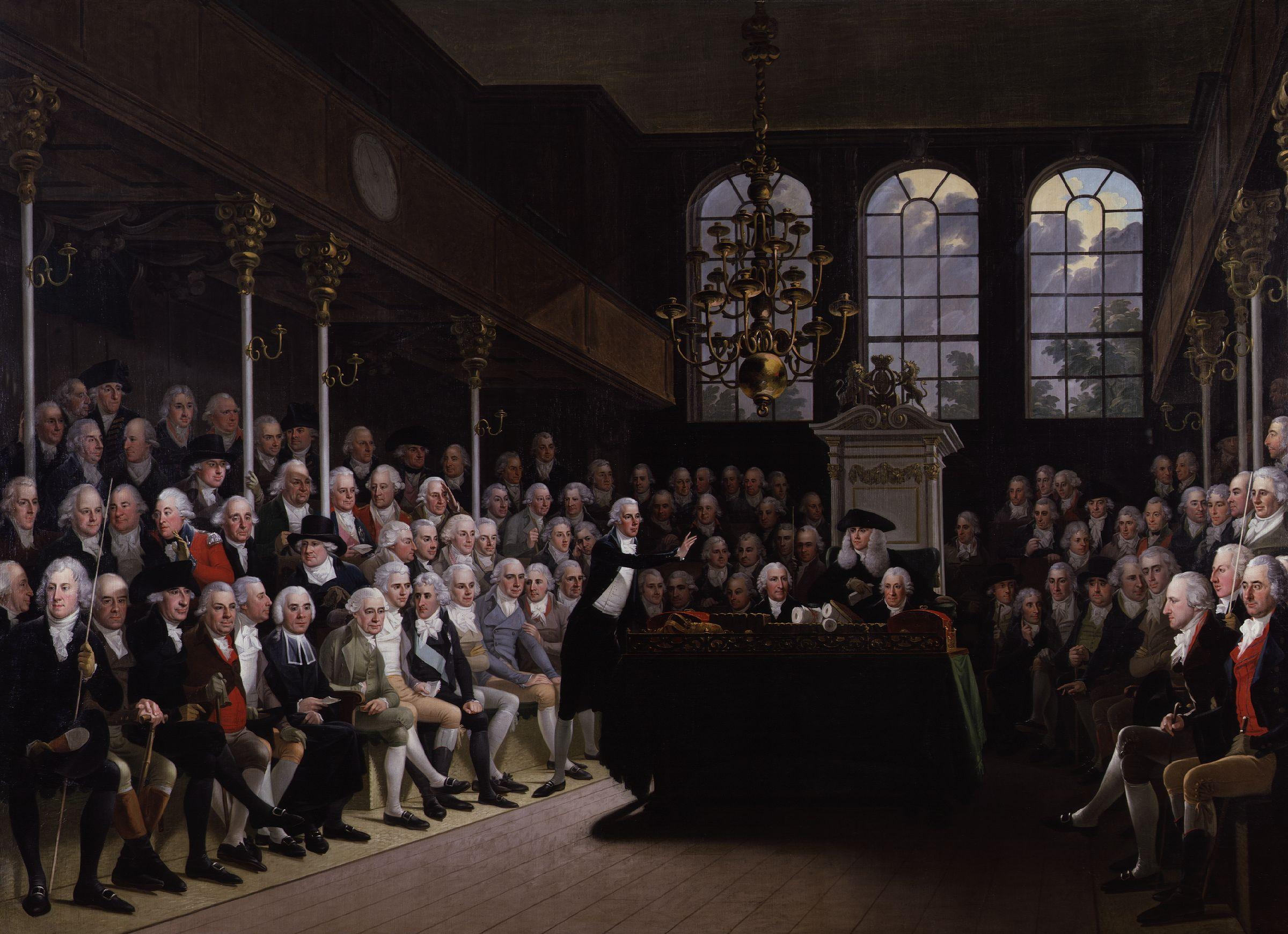
Pitt (standing centre) addressing the Commons on the outbreak of the war with France (1793); The House of Commons, 1793–94 by Anton Hickel

An early favourable response to the French Revolution encouraged many in Great Britain to reopen the issue of parliamentary reform, which had been dormant since Pitt's reform bill was defeated in 1785. The reformers, however, were quickly labelled as radicals and associates of the French revolutionaries. Pitt, due to economic reasons, wanted to remain aloof from War with France. However, this option was taken away from him by an ultimatum from George III. Pitt could either resign or go to war. Committed to making Britain financially stable Pitt agreed, albeit very reluctantly, to go to war against the French Revolutionaries. Though France's declaration of hostilities against Britain meant that Britain was forced into war. Subsequently, in 1794, Pitt's administration tried three of them for treason but lost. Parliament began to enact repressive legislation in order to silence the reformers. Individuals who published seditious material were punished, and, in 1794, the writ of habeas corpus was suspended. Other repressive measures included the Seditious Meetings Act 1795, which restricted the right of individuals to assemble publicly, and the Combination Acts, which restricted the formation of societies or organisations that favoured political reforms. Problems manning the Royal Navy also led to Pitt to introduce the Quota System in 1795 in addition to the existing system of impressment.

The war with France was extremely expensive, straining Great Britain's finances. Unlike in the latter stages of the Napoleonic Wars, at this point Britain had only a very small standing army, and thus contributed to the war effort mainly through sea power and by supplying funds to other coalition members facing France.

=== Ideological struggle ===
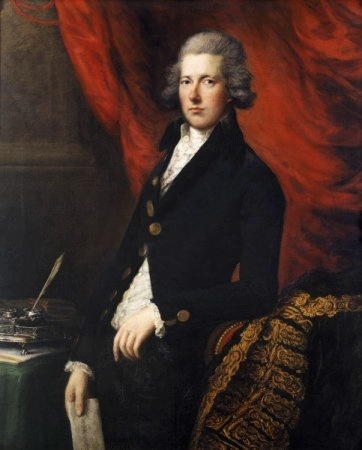
William Pitt by Gainsborough Dupont in the Burrell Collection, Glasgow

Throughout the 1790s, the war against France was presented as an ideological struggle between French republicanism and British monarchism with the British government seeking to mobilise public opinion in support of the war. The Pitt government waged a vigorous propaganda campaign contrasting the ordered society of Britain dominated by the aristocracy and the gentry vs. the "anarchy" of the French Revolution and always sought to associate British "radicals" with the revolution in France. Some of the writers the British government subsidized (often from Secret Service funds) included Edmund Burke, William Cobbett, William Playfair, John Reeves, and Samuel Johnson (the last through the pension granted him in 1762).

Though the Pitt government did drastically reduce civil liberties and created a nationwide spy network with ordinary people being encouraged to denounce any "radicals" that might be in their midst, the historian Eric J. Evans argued the picture of Pitt's "reign of terror" as portrayed by the Marxist historian E. P. Thompson is incorrect, stating there is much evidence of a "popular conservative movement" that rallied in defence of King and country. Evans wrote that there were about 200 prosecutions of "radicals" suspected of sympathy with the French revolution in British courts in the 1790s, which was much less than the prosecutions of suspected Jacobites after the rebellions of 1715 and 1745.

However, the spy network maintained by the government was efficient. In Jane Austen's novel Northanger Abbey, which was written in the 1790s, but not published until 1817, one of the characters remarks that it is not possible for a family to keep secrets in these modern times when spies for the government were lurking everywhere. This comment captures well the tense, paranoid atmosphere of the 1790s, when people were being encouraged to report "radicals" to the authorities.

=== Saint-Domingue ===
In 1793, Pitt approved plans to capture the French colony of Saint-Domingue, which had been in a state of unrest since a 1791 slave rebellion. Its capture would provide a bargaining chip for future negotiations with France and prevent similar unrest in the British West Indies. Planters in the British West Indies were greatly disturbed by events in Saint-Domingue, and many pressured the Pitt ministry to invade the colony. On 20 September 1793, a British invasion force sent from Jamaica landed in Jérémie, where they were greeted with cheers by the city's white population. Two days later, another British force under Commodore John Ford took Môle-Saint-Nicolas without a fight. However, British attempts to expand into the rest of the colony were frustrated by a lack of troops and yellow fever. As commissioners sent by the French Republic to Saint-Domingue had abolished slavery, an institution legal in areas of the colony under British occupation, most of Saint-Domingue's Black inhabitants rallied to the Republican cause. An undeterred Pitt launched what he called the "great push" in 1795, sending out an even larger expedition.

In November 1795 some 218 ships left Portsmouth for Saint-Domingue. After the failure of the Quiberon expedition earlier in 1795, when the British landed a force of French royalists on the coast of France who were annihilated by the French Revolutionary Army, Pitt had decided it was crucial for Britain to take Saint-Domingue, no matter what the cost in lives and money, to improve Britain's negotiating hand when it came time to make peace with the French Republic. The historian Michael Duffy argued that since Pitt committed far more manpower and money to the Caribbean expeditions, especially the one to Saint-Domingue, than he ever did to Europe in the years 1793–1798, it is proper to view the West Indies as Britain's main theatre of war and Europe as more of a sideshow. By 1795 half the British Army was in the West Indies (with the largest contingent in Saint-Domingue), with the rest being divided among Europe, India and North America.

As the British death toll, largely caused by yellow fever, continued to climb, Pitt was criticised in the House of Commons. Several MPs suggested it might be better to abandon the expedition, but Pitt insisted that Britain had given its word of honour that it would protect allied French colonists in Saint-Domingue. In 1797 Colonel Thomas Maitland arrived in Saint-Domingue and quickly realised the British position there was untenable. He negotiated a withdrawal with Governor-General Toussaint Louverture and the last British troops left the colony on 31 August 1798. The invasion had cost HM Treasury 4 million pounds (roughly £500 million in 2024) and resulted in the deaths of roughly 50,000 soldiers and sailors in British service, mostly through disease, with another 50,000 no longer fit for service. The military historian Sir John Fortescue wrote that Pitt and his cabinet had tried to destroy French power "in these pestilent islands ... only to discover, when it was too late, that they practically destroyed the British army". Fortescue wrote that the British troops who served in Saint-Domingue were "victims of imbecility".

=== Ireland ===
Pitt maintained close control over Ireland. The Lord Lieutenants were to follow his policy of Protestant control and very little reform for the Catholic majority. When the opposition Portland group joined Pitt's ministry, splitting the Foxite opposition, Pitt was put in a difficult situation. He wanted to replace his friend Westmorland, who was Lord Lieutenant, with Lord Camden, whom he could trust. However, one of Portland's group, Earl Fitzwilliam, wanted the position. Pitt, to keep Portland on side, appointed Fitzwilliam but allowed the new Lord Lieutenant to believe that he had free range to reform the government in Ireland. Thus, when Fitzwilliam's reforms became public in London he was quickly recalled and Camden replaced him. This ensured Pitt had his man in Dublin Castle, whilst also retaining Portland and his group. The unfortunate effect was to produce optimism amongst Irish Catholics who wanted political reform. In May 1798, the long-simmering unrest in Ireland exploded into outright rebellion with the United Irishmen Society launching a revolt to win independence for Ireland. Pitt took an extremely repressive approach to the United Irishmen with the Crown executing about 1,500 United Irishmen after the revolt. The revolt of 1798 destroyed Pitt's faith in the governing competence of the Dublin parliament (dominated by Protestant Ascendancy families). Thinking a less sectarian and more conciliatory approach would have avoided the uprising, Pitt sought an Act of Union that would make Ireland an official part of the United Kingdom and end the "Irish Question". The French expeditions to Ireland in 1796 and 1798 (to support the United Irishmen) were regarded by Pitt as near-misses that might have provided an Irish base for French attacks on Britain, thus making the "Irish Question" a national security matter. As the Dublin parliament did not wish to disband, Pitt made generous use of what would now be called "pork barrel politics" to bribe Irish MPs to vote for the Act of Union.

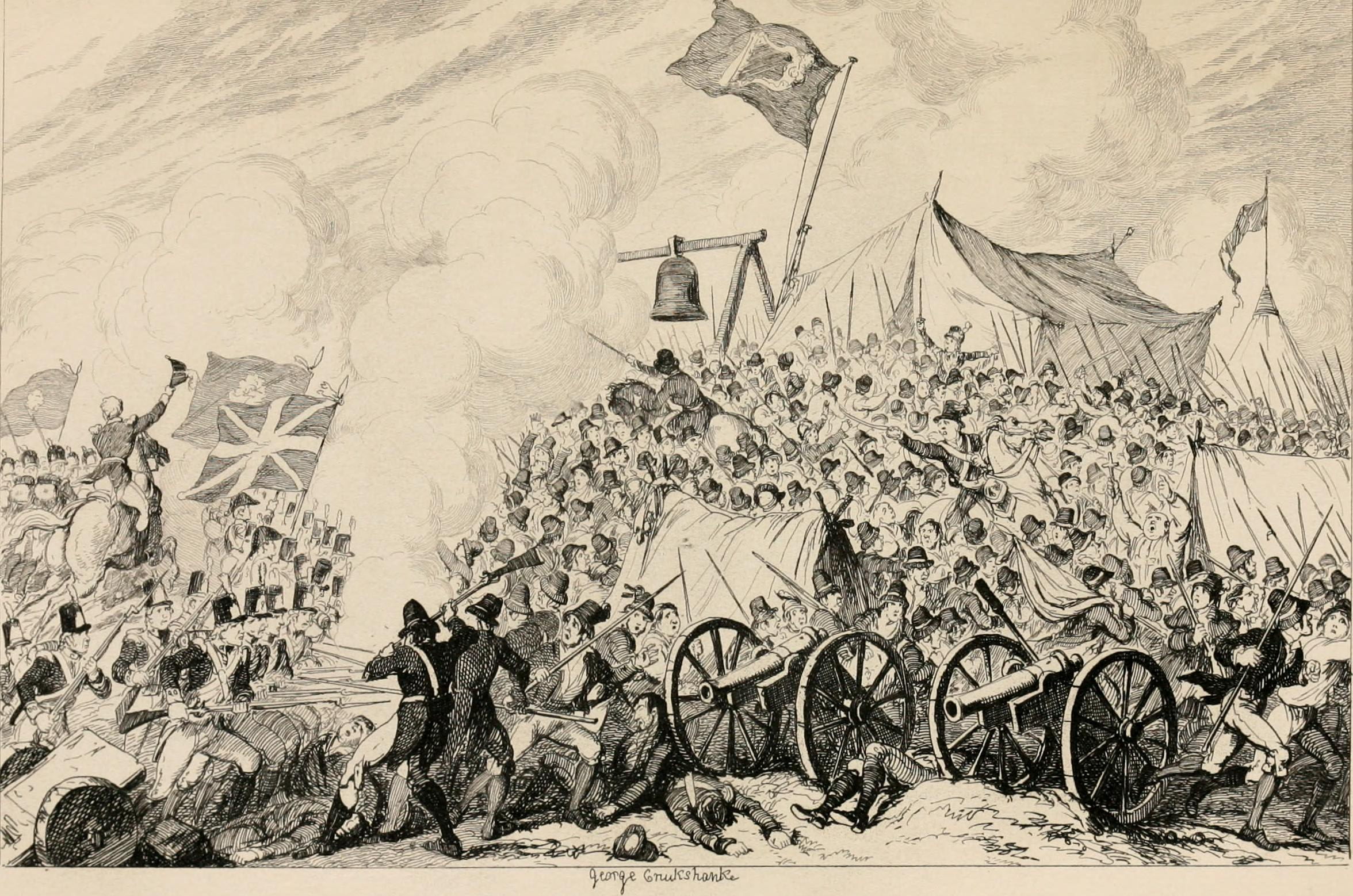
Irish Rebellion of 1798

Throughout the 1790s, the popularity of the Society of United Irishmen grew. Influenced by the American and French revolutions, this movement demanded independence and republicanism for Ireland. The United Irishmen Society was very anti-clerical, being equally opposed to the "superstitions" promoted by both the Church of England and the Roman Catholic church, which caused the latter to support the Crown. Realising that the Catholic church was an ally in the struggle against the French Revolution, Pitt had tried fruitlessly to persuade the Dublin parliament to loosen the anti-Catholic laws to "keep things quiet in Ireland". Pitt's efforts to soften the anti-Catholic laws failed in the face of determined resistance from the families of the Protestant Ascendancy in Ireland, who forced Pitt to recall the Earl Fitzwilliam as Lord Lieutenant of Ireland in 1795, when the latter had indicated he would support a bill for Catholic relief. In fact, the actions of Fitzwilliam had been encouraged by Pitt who wanted an excuse to remove Fitzwilliam and replace him with the Earl of Camden, however, Pitt had managed this feat without witnesses. Pitt was very much opposed to Catholic relief and the repeal of their political disabilities which were contained in the Test and Corporation Laws. In much of rural Ireland, law and order had broken down as an economic crisis further impoverished the already poor Irish peasantry, and a sectarian war with many atrocities on both sides had begun in 1793 between Catholic "Defenders" and Protestant "Peep o' Day Boys". A section of the Peep o'Day Boys who had renamed themselves the Loyal Orange Order in September 1795 were fanatically committed to upholding Protestant supremacy in Ireland at "almost any cost". In December 1796, a French invasion of Ireland led by General Lazare Hoche (scheduled to coordinate with a rising of the United Irishmen) was only thwarted by bad weather. To crush the United Irishmen, Pitt sent General Gerard Lake to Ulster in 1797 to call out Protestant Irish militiamen and organised an intelligence network of spies and informers.

=== Spithead mutiny ===
In April 1797 the mutiny of the entire Spithead fleet shook the government (sailors demanded a pay increase to match inflation). This mutiny occurred at the same moment that the Franco-Dutch alliance were preparing an invasion of Britain. To regain control of the fleet, Pitt agreed to navy pay increases and had George III pardon the mutineers. By contrast, the more political "floating republic" naval mutiny at the Nore in June 1797 led by Richard Parker was handled more repressively. Pitt refused to negotiate with Parker, whom he wanted to see hanged as a mutineer. In response to the 1797 mutinies, Pitt passed the Incitement to Mutiny Act 1797 making it unlawful to advocate breaking oaths to the Crown. In 1798, he passed the Defence of the Realm act, which further restricted civil liberties. Despite the major concerns to Britain's defences when the navy mutinied Pitt remained calm and in control. He was confident that the matter would be resolved. Lord Spencer, the First Lord of the Admiralty recalled how calm Pitt was. Very late one evening after visiting the Minister with desperate news of the fleet, as Spencer proceeded away from Downing Street, he remembered he had some more information to give to Pitt. He immediately returned to Number 10 only to be informed that Pitt was fast asleep. Henry Dundas, who was President of the Board of Control, Treasurer of the Navy, Secretary at War and a close friend of Pitt, envied the First Minister for his ability to sleep well in all circumstances.

=== Failure ===
Despite Pitt's efforts, the French continued to defeat the First Coalition, which collapsed in 1798. A Second Coalition, consisting of Great Britain, Austria, Russia, and the Ottoman Empire, was formed, but it, too, failed to overcome the French. The fall of the Second Coalition with the defeat of the Austrians at the Battle of Marengo (14 June 1800) and at the Battle of Hohenlinden (3 December 1800) left Great Britain facing France alone.

== Duel ==
In May 1798, Pitt fought a duel against George Tierney. Their dispute began when Pitt proposed a measure to increase the manpower of the Royal Navy. Tierney called for more time to consider the bill, which frustrated Pitt, who then accused Tierney of obstructing national defense. When Tierney protested against the remark, Pitt refused to withdraw his comment. The next day, Pitt received a challenge to a duel from Major-General George Walpole, acting as Tierney's second. Pitt accepted immediately and asked the Speaker of the House of Commons, Henry Addington, to be his second, but Addington refused. He then sought Thomas Steele, but when Steele could not be contacted, Dudley Ryder agreed to act as his second.

The two met by arrangement at Putney Heath on 27 May 1798. Armed with dueling pistols, both men took aim at twelve paces and missed. When it came time to take a second shot, Pitt deliberately aimed into the air. The seconds then jointly intervened and insisted the duel end, having decided that sufficient satisfaction had been given and that both parties had retained their honor.

== Resignation ==
Following the Acts of Union 1800, Pitt sought to inaugurate the new United Kingdom of Great Britain and Ireland by granting concessions to Roman Catholics, who formed a 75% majority of the population in Ireland, by abolishing various political restrictions under which they suffered. The king was strongly opposed to Catholic emancipation; he argued that to grant additional liberty would violate his coronation oath, in which he had promised to protect the established Church of England. Pitt, unable to change the king's strong views, resigned on 16 February 1801 so as to allow Henry Addington, his political friend, to form a new administration. At about the same time, however, the king suffered a renewed bout of madness, with the consequence that Addington could not receive his formal appointment. Though he had resigned, Pitt temporarily continued to discharge his duties; on 18 February 1801, he brought forward the annual budget. Power was transferred from Pitt to Addington on 14 March, when the king recovered.

== Cabinet ==
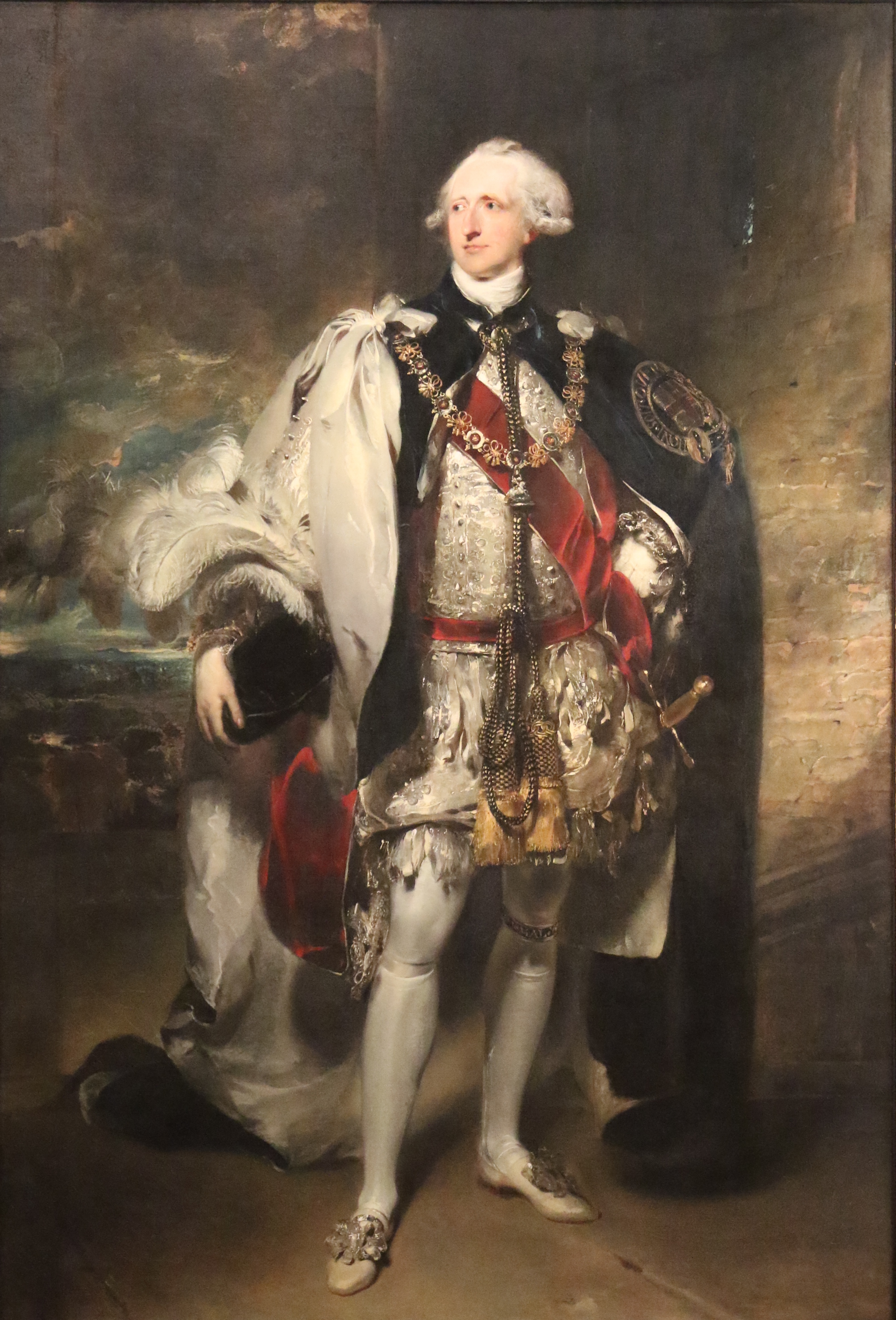
Portrait of the Duke of Leeds by Thomas Lawrence. Appointed as Foreign Secretary while still Lord Carmarthen, he held the post from 1783 to 1791.

Portfolio	Minister	Took office	Left office	Party
First Lord of the Treasury; Chancellor of the Exchequer	William Pitt the Younger (head of ministry)	19 December 1783	14 March 1801	Tory
Lord Chancellor	Edward Thurlow, 1st Baron Thurlow	23 December 1783	June 1792	Tory
Lord Chancellor	Alexander Wedderburn, 1st Baron Loughborough	28 January 1793	14 April 1801	Independent
Lord President of the Council	Granville Leveson-Gower, 2nd Earl Gower	19 December 1783	1 December 1784	Tory
Lord President of the Council	Charles Pratt, 1st Earl Camden	1 December 1784	18 April 1794	Tory
Lord President of the Council	William Fitzwilliam, 4th Earl Fitzwilliam	1 July 1794	17 December 1794	Whig
Lord President of the Council	David Murray, 2nd Earl of Mansfield	17 December 1794	1 September 1796	Tory
Lord President of the Council	John Pitt, 2nd Earl of Chatham	21 September 1796	Continued	Independent
Lord Privy Seal	Charles Manners, 4th Duke of Rutland	23 December 1783	27 November 1784	Independent
Lord Privy Seal	Granville Leveson-Gower, 2nd Earl Gower	27 November 1784	1794	Tory
Lord Privy Seal	George Spencer, 2nd Earl Spencer	1794	16 July 1794	Whig
Lord Privy Seal	John Pitt, 2nd Earl of Chatham	16 July 1794	14 February 1798	Independent
Lord Privy Seal	John Fane, 10th Earl of Westmorland	14 February 1798	Continued	Tory
Secretary of State for Foreign Affairs	George Nugent-Temple-Grenville, 3rd Earl Temple	19 December 1783	23 December 1783	Tory
Secretary of State for Foreign Affairs	Francis Osborne, 5th Duke of Leeds	23 December 1783	May 1791	Tory
Secretary of State for Foreign Affairs	William Grenville, 1st Baron Grenville	8 June 1791	20 February 1801	Tory
Secretary of State for Foreign Affairs	Robert Jenkinson, Baron Hawkesbury	20 February 1801	Continued	Tory
Secretary of State for War	Henry Dundas	11 July 1794	17 March 1801	Tory
Secretary at War	William Windham	1794	1801	Whig
Secretary of State for the Home Department	George Nugent-Temple-Grenville, 3rd Earl Temple	19 December 1783	23 December 1783	Tory
Secretary of State for the Home Department	Thomas Townshend, 1st Viscount Sydney	23 December 1783	5 June 1789	Whig
Secretary of State for the Home Department	William Grenville, 1st Baron Grenville	5 June 1789	8 June 1791	Tory
Secretary of State for the Home Department	Henry Dundas	8 June 1791	11 July 1794	Tory
Secretary of State for the Home Department	William Cavendish-Bentinck, 3rd Duke of Portland	11 July 1794	Continued	Whig
First Lord of the Admiralty	Richard Howe, 1st Viscount Howe	1783	1788	Independent
First Lord of the Admiralty	John Pitt, 2nd Earl of Chatham	1788	1794	Independent
First Lord of the Admiralty	George Spencer, 2nd Earl Spencer	1794	1801	Whig
First Lord of the Admiralty	John Jervis, 1st Earl of St Vincent	1801	Continued	Whig
Master-General of the Ordnance	Charles Lennox, 3rd Duke of Richmond	1784	1795	Tory
Master-General of the Ordnance	Charles Cornwallis, 1st Marquess Cornwallis	1795	1801	Independent
President of the Board of Trade	Charles Jenkinson, 1st Earl of Liverpool	23 August 1786	Continued	Tory
Lord Lieutenant of Ireland	Robert Henley, 2nd Earl of Northington	3 May 1783	12 February 1784	Independent
Lord Lieutenant of Ireland	Charles Manners, 4th Duke of Rutland	12 February 1784	27 October 1787	Independent
Lord Lieutenant of Ireland	George Nugent-Temple-Grenville, 1st Marquess of Buckingham	27 October 1787	24 October 1789	Tory
Lord Lieutenant of Ireland	John Fane, 10th Earl of Westmorland	24 October 1789	13 December 1794	Tory
Lord Lieutenant of Ireland	William Fitzwilliam, 4th Earl Fitzwilliam	13 December 1794	13 March 1795	Whig
Lord Lieutenant of Ireland	John Pratt, 2nd Earl Camden	13 March 1795	14 June 1798	Tory
Lord Lieutenant of Ireland	Charles Cornwallis, 1st Marquess Cornwallis	14 June 1798	27 April 1801	Independent

=== Changes ===
- March 1784 – The Duke of Rutland becomes Lord Lieutenant of Ireland, remaining also Lord Privy Seal.
- December 1784 – Lord Gower (Lord Stafford from 1786) succeeds Rutland as Lord Privy Seal (Rutland remains Viceroy of Ireland). Lord Camden succeeds Gower as Lord President.
- November 1787 – Lord Buckingham succeeds Rutland as Lord Lieutenant of Ireland.
- July 1788 – Lord Chatham, Pitt's elder brother, succeeds Lord Howe as First Lord of the Admiralty.
- June 1789 – William Grenville (Lord Grenville from 1790) succeeds Lord Sydney as Home Secretary.
- October 1789 – Lord Westmorland succeeds Buckingham as Lord Lieutenant of Ireland.
- June 1791 –
  - Grenville succeeds the Duke of Leeds (Lord Carmarthen before 1789) as Foreign Secretary.
  - Henry Dundas succeeds Grenville as Home Secretary.
  - Lord Hawkesbury (from 1796 Earl of Liverpool), the President of the Board of Trade, joins the Cabinet.
- June 1792 – Lord Thurlow resigns as Lord Chancellor. The Great Seal goes into commission.
- January 1793 – Lord Loughborough becomes Lord Chancellor.
- July 1794 –
  - Lord Fitzwilliam succeeds Camden as Lord President.
  - Dundas takes the new Secretaryship of State for War, while the Duke of Portland succeeds him as Home Secretary.
  - Lord Spencer succeeds Stafford as Lord Privy Seal.
  - William Windham enters the Cabinet as Secretary at War.
- December 1794 –
  - Chatham succeeds Spencer as Lord Privy Seal.
  - Spencer succeeds Chatham as First Lord of the Admiralty.
  - Fitzwilliam succeeds Westmorland as Viceroy of Ireland.
  - Lord Mansfield succeeds Fitzwilliam as Lord President.
- February 1795 – Lord Cornwallis succeeds the Duke of Richmond as Master-General of the Ordnance.
- March 1795 – Camden succeeds Fitzwilliam as Lord Lieutenant of Ireland.
- September 1796 – Chatham succeeds Mansfield as Lord President. Chatham remains Lord Privy Seal.
- February 1798 – Westmorland succeeds Chatham as Lord Privy Seal. Chatham remains Lord President.
- June 1798 – Cornwallis succeeds Camden as Lord Lieutenant of Ireland, remaining also Master-General of the Ordnance.
- February 1801 – Grenville, Spencer, and Windham resign from the Cabinet. The first two are succeeded by Lord Hawkesbury and Lord St Vincent, while Windham's successor is not in the Cabinet.

== Bibliography ==
- Black, Jeremy (1994). British Foreign Policy in an Age of Revolutions, 1783-1793. Cambridge University Press. ISBN 9780521466844.
- Duffy, Michael (1987). Soldiers, Sugar, and Seapower: The British Expeditions to the West Indies and the War Against Revolutionary France. Oxford: Clarendon Press.
- Ehrman, John (1969). The Younger Pitt, Vol. 1: The Years of Acclaim. Constable. ISBN 978-0-09455720-8.
- Ennis, Daniel (2002). Enter the press-gang: naval impressment in eighteenth-century British literature. University of Delaware Press. ISBN 978-0-87413-755-2.
- Evans, Eric (2002). William Pitt the Younger. London: Routledge.
- Geggus, David (1982). Slavery, War and Revolution: The British Occupation of Saint Domingue, 1793–1798. New York: Clarendon Press.
- Hague, William (2005). William Pitt the Younger. HarperPerennial. ISBN 978-0-00-714720-5.
- Irvine, Robert (2005). Jane Austen. London: Routledge.
- James, C.L.R. (1938). Black Jacobins. London: Penguin.
- Perry, James (2005). Arrogant Armies: Great Military Disasters and the Generals Behind Them. Edison: Castle Books.
- Porritt, Edward (1909). "The Evolution of the Non-partisan Speaker". The Unreformed House of Commons. CUP Archive. p. 461.
- Short, D., ed. (1785). Criticisms on the Rolliad: Part the First (2nd ed.). London: James Ridgway. OCLC 5203303.
- Turner, Michael J. (2003). Pitt the Younger: A Life. Continuum International Publishing Group. ISBN 978-1-85285-377-8.
- Wakeman, Henry Offley (1909). Charles James Fox (3rd ed.). London: Gibbings. OL 7116684M.

Preceded by Fox–North coalition	Government of Great Britain; 1783–1801	Acts of Union
First Acts of Union	Government of the United Kingdom; 1801	Succeeded by Addington ministry
