= Quota system =

Quota System can refer to:

- Quota System (Royal Navy), a system in place from 1791 to 1815 for manning British naval ships
- Reservation in India, quota systems in India favoring lower castes, women, religious minorities, indigenous peoples, and others
- Quota Borda system
- Racial quota, in hiring minorities
- Quotaism
- Import quota, in trade regulations
- Ticket quota, in police departments

== See also ==
- Diversity, equity, and inclusion
