= President of the Board of Trade =

Head of the Board of Trade, a committee of the Privy Council of the United Kingdom

United Kingdom President of the Board of Trade
- Royal Arms as used by His Majesty's Government

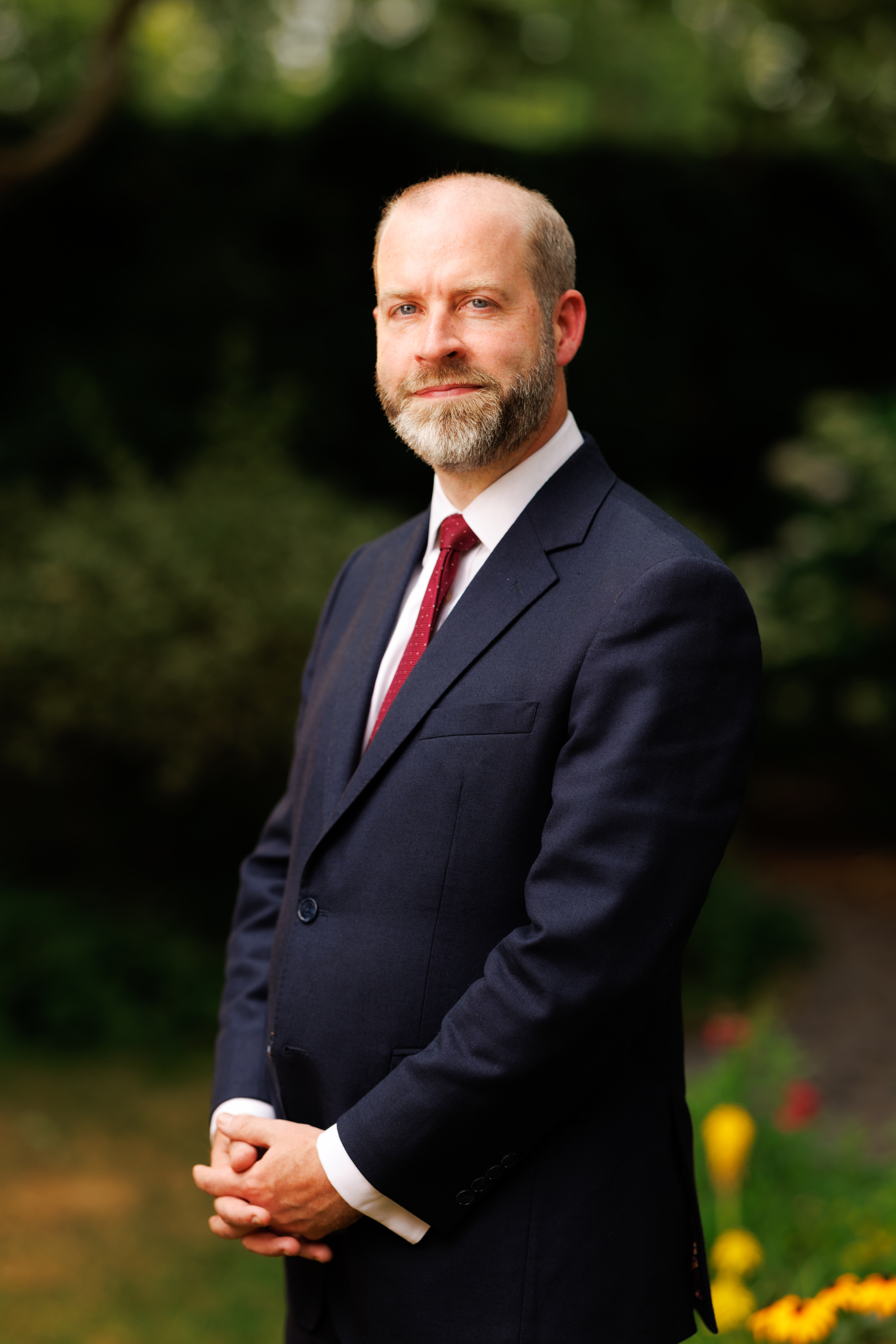
- Incumbent; Jonathan Reynolds since 20 July 2026
- Board of Trade; UK Export Finance
- Style: The Right Honourable (formal prefix); President of the Board of Trade
- Member of: Cabinet; Privy Council
- Reports to: The Prime Minister
- Seat: Westminster, London
- Appointer: The Sovereign on advice of the Prime Minister
- Term length: No fixed term
- Website: gov.uk/government/ministers/president-of-the-board-of-trade

The president of the Board of Trade is head of the Board of Trade. A committee of the Privy Council of the United Kingdom, it was first established as a temporary committee of inquiry in the 17th century that evolved gradually into a government department with diverse functions. The current holder of the post is Jonathan Reynolds, who is concurrently the secretary of state for business, innovation, science and trade.

== History ==
The idea of a Board of Trade was first translated into action by Oliver Cromwell in 1655 when he appointed his son Richard Cromwell to head a body of Lords of the Privy Council, judges and merchants to consider measures to promote trade. Charles II established a Council of Trade on 7 November 1660, followed by a Council of Foreign Plantations on 1 December that year. The two were united on 16 September 1672 as the Board of Trade and Plantations.

After the Board was re-established in 1696, there were 15 (and later 16) members of the Board – the 7 (later 8) great officers of state, and eight unofficial members, who did the majority of the work. The senior unofficial board member was the board president, commonly known as the first lord of trade. The board was abolished on 11 July 1782, but a Committee of the Privy Council was established on 5 March 1784 for the same purposes. On 23 August 1786, a new committee was set up, more strongly focused on commercial functions than the previous boards of trade. At first, the president of the Board of Trade only occasionally sat in the Cabinet. Still, from the early 19th century, it was usually a cabinet-level position.

In 2020, there was an unusual appointment of a deputy president to assist the president. Still, the holder remained only an adviser to the board. This appears to have been a one-off appointment, and this role no longer exists. However, the president was previously assisted by the vice president.

== List of presidents of the Board of Trade ==
=== First Lord of Trade (1672–1782) ===
First Lord	Term of office		Monarch
Anthony Ashley Cooper; 1st Earl of Shaftesbury	16 September 1672	1676	Charles II (1660–1685)
John Egerton; 3rd Earl of Bridgewater	16 December 1695	9 June 1699	William III (1689–1702)
Thomas Grey; 2nd Earl of Stamford	9 June 1699	19 June 1702	William III (1689–1702)
Thomas Grey; 2nd Earl of Stamford	9 June 1699	19 June 1702	Anne (1702–1714
Thomas Thynne; 1st Viscount Weymouth	19 June 1702	1705	Anne (1702–1714
Thomas Grey; 2nd Earl of Stamford	1705	12 June 1711	Anne (1702–1714
Charles Finch; 4th Earl of Winchilsea	12 June 1711	15 September 1713	Anne (1702–1714
Francis North; 2nd Baron Guilford	15 September 1713	September; 1714	Anne (1702–1714
Francis North; 2nd Baron Guilford	15 September 1713	September; 1714	George I (1714–1727
William Berkeley; 4th Baron Berkeley of Stratton	September; 1714	12 May 1715	George I (1714–1727
Henry Howard; 6th Earl of Suffolk	12 May 1715	31 January 1718	George I (1714–1727
Robert Darcy; 3rd Earl of Holderness	31 January 1718	11 May 1719	George I (1714–1727
Thomas Fane; 6th Earl of Westmorland	11 May 1719	May; 1735	George I (1714–1727
Thomas Fane; 6th Earl of Westmorland	11 May 1719	May; 1735	George II (1727–1760
Benjamin Mildmay; 1st Earl FitzWalter	May; 1735	June; 1737	George II (1727–1760
John Monson; 1st Baron Monson	June; 1737	1 November 1748	George II (1727–1760
George Montagu-Dunk; 2nd Earl of Halifax	1 November 1748	21 March 1761	George II (1727–1760
George Montagu-Dunk; 2nd Earl of Halifax	1 November 1748	21 March 1761	George III (1760–1820)
Samuel Sandys; 1st Baron Sandys	21 March 1761	1 March 1763	George III (1760–1820)
Charles Townshend	1 March 1763	20 April 1763	George III (1760–1820)
William Petty; 2nd Earl of Shelburne	20 April 1763	9 September 1763	George III (1760–1820)
Wills Hill; 1st Earl of Hillsborough	9 September 1763	20 July 1765	George III (1760–1820)
William Legge; 2nd Earl of Dartmouth	20 July 1765	16 August 1766	George III (1760–1820)
Wills Hill; 1st Earl of Hillsborough	16 August 1766	December; 1766	George III (1760–1820)
Robert Nugent; 1st Viscount Clare	19 January 1767	20 January 1768	George III (1760–1820)
Wills Hill; 1st Earl of Hillsborough	20 January 1768	31 August 1772	George III (1760–1820)
William Legge; 2nd Earl of Dartmouth	31 August 1772	10 November 1775	George III (1760–1820)
George Germain; 1st Viscount Sackville	10 November 1775	6 November 1779	George III (1760–1820)
Frederick Howard; 5th Earl of Carlisle	6 November 1779	9 December 1780	George III (1760–1820)
Thomas Robinson; 2nd Baron Grantham	9 December 1780	11 July 1782	George III (1760–1820)

=== President of the Committee on Trade and Foreign Plantations (1784–1786) ===
President of the Committee	Term of office		Party	Ministry	Monarch
Thomas Townshend; 1st Baron Sydney	5 March 1784	23 August 1786	Whig	Pitt I	George III (1760–1820)

=== President of the Board of Trade (1786–1963) ===
President of the Board Constituency	Term of office		Party	Ministry	Monarch
Charles Jenkinson; 1st Earl of Liverpool	23 August 1786	7 June 1804	Tory	Pitt I	George III (1760–1820)
Charles Jenkinson; 1st Earl of Liverpool	23 August 1786	7 June 1804	Tory	Addington	George III (1760–1820)
James Graham; 3rd Duke of Montrose	7 June 1804	5 February 1806	Tory	Pitt II	George III (1760–1820)
William Eden; 1st Baron Auckland	5 February 1806	31 March 1807	Independent	All the Talents	George III (1760–1820)
Henry Bathurst; 3rd Earl Bathurst	31 March 1807	29 September 1812	Tory	Portland II	George III (1760–1820)
Henry Bathurst; 3rd Earl Bathurst	31 March 1807	29 September 1812	Tory	Perceval	George III (1760–1820)
Henry Bathurst; 3rd Earl Bathurst	31 March 1807	29 September 1812	Tory	Liverpool	George III (1760–1820)
Richard Trench; 2nd Earl of Clancarty	29 September 1812	24 January 1818	Tory	Liverpool	George III (1760–1820)
F. J. Robinson; MP for Ripon	24 January 1818	21 February 1823	Tory	Liverpool	George III (1760–1820)
F. J. Robinson; MP for Ripon	24 January 1818	21 February 1823	Tory	Liverpool	George IV (1820–1830)
William Huskisson; MP for Liverpool	21 February 1823	4 September 1827	Tory	Liverpool	George IV (1820–1830)
William Huskisson; MP for Liverpool	21 February 1823	4 September 1827	Tory	Canning	George IV (1820–1830)
Charles Grant; MP for Inverness-shire	4 September 1827	11 June 1828	Tory	Goderich	George IV (1820–1830)
Charles Grant; MP for Inverness-shire	4 September 1827	11 June 1828	Tory	Wellington–Peel	George IV (1820–1830)
William Vesey-FitzGerald; MP for Newport (Cornwall) (Note: Formerly MP for County Clare, William Vesey-FitzGerald was briefly not sitting as an MP after the defeat in by-election of Clare and before the by-election of Newport (Cornwall).)	11 June 1828	2 February 1830	Tory	Wellington–Peel	George IV (1820–1830)
John Charles Herries; MP for Harwich	2 February 1830	22 November 1830	Tory	Wellington–Peel	George IV (1820–1830)
John Charles Herries; MP for Harwich	2 February 1830	22 November 1830	Tory	Wellington–Peel	William IV (1830–1837)
George Eden; 1st Baron Auckland	22 November 1830	5 June 1834	Whig	Grey	William IV (1830–1837)
George Eden; 1st Baron Auckland	22 November 1830	5 June 1834	Whig	Melbourne I	William IV (1830–1837)
Charles Poulett Thomson; MP for Manchester	5 June 1834	14 November 1834	Whig	Melbourne I	William IV (1830–1837)
Alexander Baring; MP for North Essex	15 December 1834	8 April 1835	Tory	Wellington Caretaker	William IV (1830–1837)
Alexander Baring; MP for North Essex	15 December 1834	8 April 1835	Tory	Peel I	William IV (1830–1837)
Charles Poulett Thomson; MP for Manchester	8 April 1835	29 August 1839	Whig	Melbourne II	William IV (1830–1837)
Charles Poulett Thomson; MP for Manchester	8 April 1835	29 August 1839	Whig	Melbourne II	Victoria (1837–1901)
Henry Labouchere; MP for Taunton	29 August 1839	30 August 1841	Whig	Melbourne II	Victoria (1837–1901)
F. J. Robinson; 1st Earl of Ripon	3 September 1841	15 May 1843	Conservative	Peel II	Victoria (1837–1901)
William Ewart Gladstone; MP for Newark	15 May 1843	5 February 1845	Conservative	Peel II	Victoria (1837–1901)
James Broun-Ramsay; 10th Earl of Dalhousie	5 February 1845	27 June 1846	Conservative	Peel II	Victoria (1837–1901)
George Villiers; 4th Earl of Clarendon	6 July 1846	22 July 1847	Whig	Russell I	Victoria (1837–1901)
Henry Labouchere; MP for Taunton	22 July 1847	21 February 1852	Whig	Russell I	Victoria (1837–1901)
J. W. Henley; MP for Oxfordshire	27 February 1852	17 December 1852	Conservative	Derby–Disraeli I	Victoria (1837–1901)
Edward Cardwell; MP for Oxford	28 December 1852	31 March 1855	Peelite	Aberdeen	Victoria (1837–1901)
Edward Stanley; 2nd Baron Stanley of Alderley	31 March 1855	21 February 1858	Whig	Palmerston	Victoria (1837–1901)
J. W. Henley; MP for Oxfordshire	26 February 1858	3 March 1859	Conservative	Derby–Disraeli II	Victoria (1837–1901)
Richard Hely-Hutchinson; 4th Earl of Donoughmore	3 March 1859	11 June 1859	Conservative	Derby–Disraeli II	Victoria (1837–1901)
Thomas Milner Gibson; MP for Ashton-under-Lyne	6 July 1859	26 June 1866	Liberal	Palmerston II	Victoria (1837–1901)
Thomas Milner Gibson; MP for Ashton-under-Lyne	6 July 1859	26 June 1866	Liberal	Russell III	Victoria (1837–1901)
Sir Stafford Northcote, 8th Baronet; MP for Devonshire North	6 July 1866	8 March 1867	Conservative	Derby–Disraeli III	Victoria (1837–1901)
Charles Gordon-Lennox; 6th Duke of Richmond	8 March 1867	1 December 1868	Conservative	Derby–Disraeli III	Victoria (1837–1901)
John Bright; MP for Birmingham	9 December 1868	14 January 1871	Liberal	Gladstone I	Victoria (1837–1901)
Chichester Parkinson-Fortescue; MP for County Louth	14 January 1871	17 February 1874	Liberal	Gladstone I	Victoria (1837–1901)
Sir Charles Adderley MP for Staffordshire North	21 February 1874	4 April 1878	Conservative	Disraeli II	Victoria (1837–1901)
Dudley Ryder; Viscount Sandon; MP for Liverpool	4 April 1878	21 April 1880	Conservative	Disraeli II	Victoria (1837–1901)
Joseph Chamberlain; MP for Birmingham	3 May 1880	9 June 1885	Liberal	Gladstone II	Victoria (1837–1901)
Charles Gordon-Lennox; 6th Duke of Richmond	24 June 1885	19 August 1885	Conservative	Salisbury I	Victoria (1837–1901)
Edward Stanhope; MP for Horncastle	19 August 1885	28 January 1886	Conservative	Salisbury I	Victoria (1837–1901)
A. J. Mundella; MP for Sheffield Brightside	17 February 1886	20 July 1886	Liberal	Gladstone III	Victoria (1837–1901)
Frederick Stanley; 1st Baron Stanley of Preston	3 August 1886	21 February 1888	Conservative	Salisbury II	Victoria (1837–1901)
Sir Michael Hicks Beach, 9th Baronet; MP for Bristol West	21 February 1888	11 August 1892	Conservative	Salisbury II	Victoria (1837–1901)
A. J. Mundella; MP for Sheffield Brightside	18 August 1892	28 May 1894	Liberal	Gladstone IV	Victoria (1837–1901)
James Bryce; MP for Aberdeen South	28 May 1894	21 June 1895	Liberal	Rosebery	Victoria (1837–1901)
Charles Ritchie; MP for Croydon	29 June 1895	7 November 1900	Conservative	Salisbury III	Victoria (1837–1901)
Gerald Balfour; MP for Leeds Central	7 November 1900	12 March 1905	Conservative	Salisbury IV	Victoria (1837–1901)
Gerald Balfour; MP for Leeds Central	7 November 1900	12 March 1905	Conservative	Salisbury IV	Edward VII (1901–1910)
Gerald Balfour; MP for Leeds Central	7 November 1900	12 March 1905	Conservative	Balfour	Edward VII (1901–1910)
James Gascoyne-Cecil; 4th Marquess of Salisbury	12 March 1905	4 December 1905	Conservative	Balfour	Edward VII (1901–1910)
David Lloyd George; MP for Carnarvon Boroughs	10 December 1905	12 April 1908	Liberal	Campbell-Bannerman	Edward VII (1901–1910)
Winston Churchill; MP for Dundee	12 April 1908	14 February 1910	Liberal	Asquith I	Edward VII (1901–1910)
Sydney Buxton; MP for Poplar	14 February 1910	11 February 1914	Liberal	Asquith II	Edward VII (1901–1910)
Sydney Buxton; MP for Poplar	14 February 1910	11 February 1914	Liberal	Asquith II	George V (1910–1936)
Sydney Buxton; MP for Poplar	14 February 1910	11 February 1914	Liberal	Asquith III	George V (1910–1936)
John Burns; MP for Battersea	11 February 1914	5 August 1914	Liberal	Asquith III	George V (1910–1936)
Walter Runciman; MP for Dewsbury	5 August 1914	5 December 1916	Liberal	Asquith III	George V (1910–1936)
Walter Runciman; MP for Dewsbury	5 August 1914	5 December 1916	Liberal	Asquith Coalition	George V (1910–1936)
Sir Albert Stanley; MP for Ashton-under-Lyne	10 December 1916	26 May 1919	Conservative	Lloyd George I	George V (1910–1936)
Sir Albert Stanley; MP for Ashton-under-Lyne	10 December 1916	26 May 1919	Conservative	Lloyd George II	George V (1910–1936)
Sir Auckland Geddes; MP for Basingstoke	26 May 1919	19 March 1920	Conservative	Lloyd George II	George V (1910–1936)
Sir Robert Horne; MP for Glasgow Hillhead	19 March 1920	1 April 1921	Conservative	Lloyd George II	George V (1910–1936)
Stanley Baldwin; MP for Bewdley	1 April 1921	19 October 1922	Conservative	Lloyd George II	George V (1910–1936)
Sir Philip Lloyd-Greame; MP for Hendon	24 October 1922	22 January 1924	Conservative	Law	George V (1910–1936)
Sir Philip Lloyd-Greame; MP for Hendon	24 October 1922	22 January 1924	Conservative	Baldwin I	George V (1910–1936)
Sidney Webb; MP for Seaham	22 January 1924	3 November 1924	Labour	MacDonald I	George V (1910–1936)
Sir Philip Cunliffe-Lister; MP for Hendon	6 November 1924	4 June 1929	Conservative	Baldwin II	George V (1910–1936)
William Graham; MP for Edinburgh Central	7 June 1929	24 August 1931	Labour	MacDonald II	George V (1910–1936)
Sir Philip Cunliffe-Lister; MP for Hendon	25 August 1931	5 November 1931	Conservative	National I	George V (1910–1936)
Walter Runciman; MP for St Ives	5 November 1931	28 May 1937	Liberal National	National II	George V (1910–1936)
Walter Runciman; MP for St Ives	5 November 1931	28 May 1937	Liberal National	National II	Edward VIII (1936)
Walter Runciman; MP for St Ives	5 November 1931	28 May 1937	Liberal National	National II	George VI (1936–1952)
Walter Runciman; MP for St Ives	5 November 1931	28 May 1937	Liberal National	National III	George VI (1936–1952)
Oliver Stanley; MP for Westmorland	28 May 1937	5 January 1940	Conservative	National IV	George VI (1936–1952)
Oliver Stanley; MP for Westmorland	28 May 1937	5 January 1940	Conservative	Chamberlain War	George VI (1936–1952)
Sir Andrew Rae Duncan; MP for City of London	5 January 1940	3 October 1940	Independent	Chamberlain War	George VI (1936–1952)
Sir Andrew Rae Duncan; MP for City of London	5 January 1940	3 October 1940	Independent	Churchill War	George VI (1936–1952)
Oliver Lyttelton; MP for Aldershot	3 October 1940	29 June 1941	Conservative	Churchill War	George VI (1936–1952)
Sir Andrew Rae Duncan; MP for City of London	29 June 1941	4 February 1942	Independent	Churchill War	George VI (1936–1952)
John Jestyn Llewellin; MP for Uxbridge	4 February 1942	22 February 1942	Conservative	Churchill War	George VI (1936–1952)
Hugh Dalton; MP for Peckham	22 February 1942	23 May 1945	Labour	Churchill War	George VI (1936–1952)
Oliver Lyttelton; MP for Aldershot	25 May 1945	26 July 1945	Conservative	Churchill Caretaker	George VI (1936–1952)
Sir Stafford Cripps; MP for Bristol East	27 July 1945	29 September 1947	Labour	Attlee I	George VI (1936–1952)
Harold Wilson; MP for Ormskirk → Huyton	29 September 1947	23 April 1951	Labour	Attlee I	George VI (1936–1952)
Harold Wilson; MP for Ormskirk → Huyton	29 September 1947	23 April 1951	Labour	Attlee II	George VI (1936–1952)
Sir Hartley Shawcross; MP for St Helens	24 April 1951	26 October 1951	Labour	Attlee II	George VI (1936–1952)
Peter Thorneycroft; MP for Monmouth	30 October 1951	13 January 1957	Conservative	Churchill III	George VI (1936–1952)
Peter Thorneycroft; MP for Monmouth	30 October 1951	13 January 1957	Conservative	Churchill III	Elizabeth II (1952–2022)
Peter Thorneycroft; MP for Monmouth	30 October 1951	13 January 1957	Conservative	Eden	Elizabeth II (1952–2022)
David Eccles; MP for Chippenham	13 January 1957	14 October 1959	Conservative	Macmillan I	Elizabeth II (1952–2022)
Reginald Maudling; MP for Barnet	14 October 1959	9 October 1961	Conservative	Macmillan II	Elizabeth II (1952–2022)
Frederick Erroll; MP for Altrincham and Sale	9 October 1961	20 October 1963	Conservative	Macmillan II	Elizabeth II (1952–2022)

=== President of the Board of Trade (1963–present) ===
President of the Board Constituency	Term of office		Concurrent office(s)	Party	Ministry	Monarch
Edward Heath; MP for Bexley	20 October 1963	16 October 1964	Secretary of State for Industry, Trade and Regional Development	Conservative	Douglas-Home	Elizabeth II (1952–2022)
Douglas Jay; MP for Battersea North	18 October 1964	29 August 1967	None	Labour	Wilson I	Elizabeth II (1952–2022)
Douglas Jay; MP for Battersea North	18 October 1964	29 August 1967	None	Labour	Wilson II	Elizabeth II (1952–2022)
Anthony Crosland; MP for Great Grimsby	29 August 1967	6 October 1969	None	Labour	Wilson II	Elizabeth II (1952–2022)
Roy Mason; MP for Barnsley Central	6 October 1969	19 June 1970	None	Labour	Wilson II	Elizabeth II (1952–2022)
Michael Noble; MP for Argyll	20 June 1970	15 October 1970	None	Conservative	Heath	Elizabeth II (1952–2022)
John Davies; MP for Knutsford	15 October 1970	5 November 1972	Secretary of State for Trade and Industry	Conservative	Heath	Elizabeth II (1952–2022)
Peter Walker; MP for Worcester	5 November 1972	4 March 1974	Secretary of State for Trade and Industry	Conservative	Heath	Elizabeth II (1952–2022)
Peter Shore; MP for Stepney and Poplar	5 March 1974	8 April 1976	Secretary of State for Trade	Labour	Wilson III	Elizabeth II (1952–2022)
Peter Shore; MP for Stepney and Poplar	5 March 1974	8 April 1976	Secretary of State for Trade	Labour	Wilson IV	Elizabeth II (1952–2022)
Edmund Dell; MP for Birkenhead	8 April 1976	11 November 1978	Secretary of State for Trade	Labour	Callaghan	Elizabeth II (1952–2022)
John Smith; MP for North Lanarkshire	11 November 1978	4 May 1979	Secretary of State for Trade	Labour	Callaghan	Elizabeth II (1952–2022)
John Nott; MP for St Ives	5 May 1979	5 January 1981	Secretary of State for Trade	Conservative	Thatcher I	Elizabeth II (1952–2022)
John Biffen; MP for Oswestry	5 January 1981	6 April 1982	Secretary of State for Trade	Conservative	Thatcher I	Elizabeth II (1952–2022)
Arthur Cockfield; Baron Cockfield	6 April 1982	12 June 1983	Secretary of State for Trade	Conservative	Thatcher I	Elizabeth II (1952–2022)
Cecil Parkinson; MP for Hertsmere	12 June 1983	11 October 1983	Secretary of State for Trade and Industry	Conservative	Thatcher II	Elizabeth II (1952–2022)
Norman Tebbit; MP for Chingford	16 October 1983	2 September 1985	Secretary of State for Trade and Industry	Conservative	Thatcher II	Elizabeth II (1952–2022)
Leon Brittan; MP for Richmond (Yorks)	2 September 1985	22 January 1986	Secretary of State for Trade and Industry	Conservative	Thatcher II	Elizabeth II (1952–2022)
Paul Channon; MP for Southend West	24 January 1986	13 June 1987	Secretary of State for Trade and Industry	Conservative	Thatcher II	Elizabeth II (1952–2022)
David Young; Baron Young of Graffham	13 June 1987	24 July 1989	Secretary of State for Trade and Industry	Conservative	Thatcher III	Elizabeth II (1952–2022)
Nicholas Ridley; MP for Cirencester and Tewkesbury	24 July 1989	13 July 1990	Secretary of State for Trade and Industry	Conservative	Thatcher III	Elizabeth II (1952–2022)
Peter Lilley; MP for St Albans	14 July 1990	10 April 1992	Secretary of State for Trade and Industry	Conservative	Thatcher III	Elizabeth II (1952–2022)
Peter Lilley; MP for St Albans	14 July 1990	10 April 1992	Secretary of State for Trade and Industry	Conservative	Major I	Elizabeth II (1952–2022)
Michael Heseltine; MP for Henley	10 April 1992	5 July 1995	Secretary of State for Trade and Industry	Conservative	Major II	Elizabeth II (1952–2022)
Ian Lang; MP for Galloway and Upper Nithsdale	5 July 1995	2 May 1997	Secretary of State for Trade and Industry	Conservative	Major II	Elizabeth II (1952–2022)
Margaret Beckett; MP for Derby South	2 May 1997	27 July 1998	Secretary of State for Trade and Industry	Labour	Blair I	Elizabeth II (1952–2022)
Peter Mandelson; MP for Hartlepool	27 July 1998	23 December 1998	Secretary of State for Trade and Industry	Labour	Blair I	Elizabeth II (1952–2022)
Stephen Byers; MP for North Tyneside	23 December 1998	8 June 2001	Secretary of State for Trade and Industry	Labour	Blair I	Elizabeth II (1952–2022)
Patricia Hewitt; MP for Leicester West	8 June 2001	6 May 2005	Secretary of State for Trade and Industry	Labour	Blair II	Elizabeth II (1952–2022)
Alan Johnson; MP for Kingston upon Hull West and Hessle	6 May 2005	5 May 2006	Secretary of State for Trade and Industry	Labour	Blair III	Elizabeth II (1952–2022)
Alistair Darling; MP for Edinburgh South West	5 May 2006	28 June 2007	Secretary of State for Trade and Industry	Labour	Blair III	Elizabeth II (1952–2022)
John Hutton; MP for Barrow and Furness	28 June 2007	3 October 2008	Secretary of State for Business, Enterprise and Regulatory Reform	Labour	Brown	Elizabeth II (1952–2022)
Peter Mandelson; Baron Mandelson	3 October 2008	12 May 2010	Secretary of State for Business, Enterprise and Regulatory Reform	Labour	Brown	Elizabeth II (1952–2022)
Peter Mandelson; Baron Mandelson	3 October 2008	12 May 2010	Secretary of State for Business, Innovation and Skills	Labour	Brown	Elizabeth II (1952–2022)
Vince Cable; MP for Twickenham	12 May 2010	8 May 2015	Secretary of State for Business, Innovation and Skills	Liberal Democrats	Cameron–Clegg	Elizabeth II (1952–2022)
Sajid Javid; MP for Bromsgrove	11 May 2015	15 July 2016	Secretary of State for Business, Innovation and Skills	Conservative	Cameron II	Elizabeth II (1952–2022)
Greg Clark (Note: Appointed by the Privy Council in error, and held the post for four days before the mistake was rectified.); MP for Tunbridge Wells	15 July 2016	19 July 2016	Secretary of State for Business, Energy and Industrial Strategy	Conservative	May I	Elizabeth II (1952–2022)
Liam Fox; MP for North Somerset	19 July 2016	24 July 2019	Secretary of State for International Trade		May I	Elizabeth II (1952–2022)
Liam Fox; MP for North Somerset	19 July 2016	24 July 2019	Secretary of State for International Trade	Conservative	May I	Elizabeth II (1952–2022)
Liam Fox; MP for North Somerset	19 July 2016	24 July 2019	Secretary of State for International Trade	Conservative	May II	Elizabeth II (1952–2022)
Liz Truss; MP for South West Norfolk	24 July 2019	15 September 2021	Secretary of State for International Trade	Conservative	Johnson I	Elizabeth II (1952–2022)
Liz Truss; MP for South West Norfolk	24 July 2019	15 September 2021	Secretary of State for International Trade	Conservative	Johnson II	Elizabeth II (1952–2022)
Anne-Marie Trevelyan; MP for Berwick-upon-Tweed	15 September 2021	6 September 2022	Secretary of State for International Trade	Conservative	Johnson II	Elizabeth II (1952–2022)
Kemi Badenoch; MP for Saffron Walden	6 September 2022	5 July 2024	Secretary of State for International Trade	Conservative	Truss	Elizabeth II (1952–2022)
Kemi Badenoch; MP for Saffron Walden	6 September 2022	5 July 2024	Secretary of State for International Trade	Conservative	Truss	Charles III (2022–)
Kemi Badenoch; MP for Saffron Walden	6 September 2022	5 July 2024	Secretary of State for International Trade	Conservative	Sunak	Charles III (2022–)
Kemi Badenoch; MP for Saffron Walden	6 September 2022	5 July 2024	Secretary of State for Business and Trade	Conservative	Sunak	Charles III (2022–)
Jonathan Reynolds; MP for Stalybridge and Hyde	5 July 2024	5 September 2025	Secretary of State for Business and Trade	Labour	Starmer	Charles III (2022–)
Peter Kyle; MP for Hove and Portslade	5 September 2025	20 July 2026	Secretary of State for Business and Trade	Labour	Starmer	Charles III (2022–)
Jonathan Reynolds; MP for Stalybridge and Hyde	20 July 2026	Incumbent	Secretary of State for Business, Innovation, Science and Trade	Labour	Burnham	Charles III (2022–)
