= Addington ministry =

Government of the United Kingdom

- 1801–1804
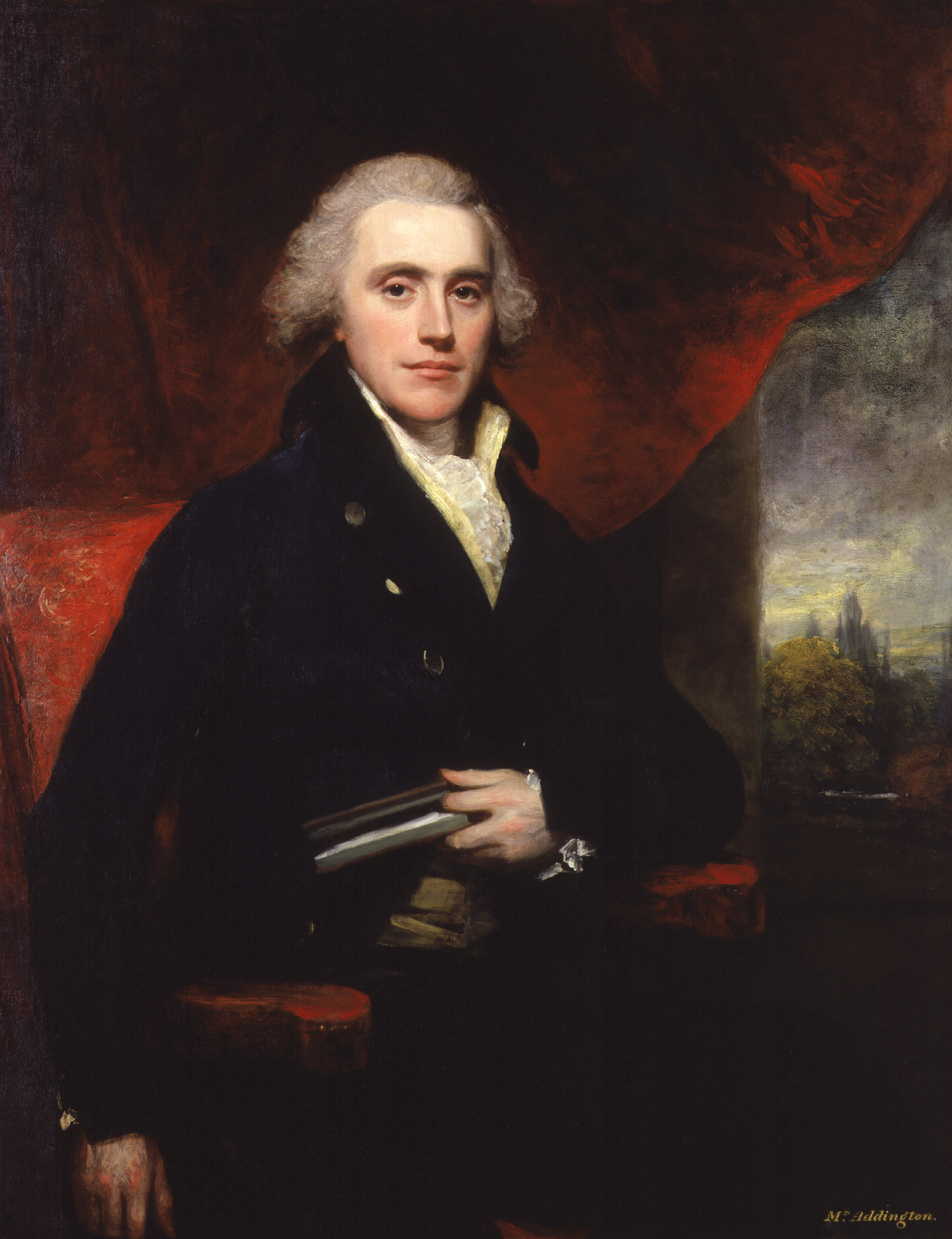
- Portrait of Henry Addington by William Beechey (1803)
- Date formed: 17 March 1801
- Date dissolved: 10 May 1804

People and organisations
- Monarch: George III
- Prime Minister: Henry Addington
- Total no. of members: 11 appointments
- Member party: Tory Party
- Status in legislature: Majority
- Opposition party: Whig Party
- Opposition leaders: Charles James Fox; Lord Grenville; William Pitt the Younger

History
- Elections: 1801 co-option; 1802 general election
- Legislature terms: 1st UK Parliament; 2nd UK Parliament
- Predecessor: First Pitt ministry
- Successor: Second Pitt ministry

Henry Addington, a member of the Tories, was appointed by King George III to lead the government of the United Kingdom of Great Britain and Ireland from 1801 to 1804 and served as an interlude between the Pitt ministries. Addington's ministry is most notable for negotiating the Treaty of Amiens, which marked a brief cessation of the Napoleonic Wars.

== Cabinet ==
| Portfolio | Minister | Took office | Left office | Party |
|---|---|---|---|---|
| First Lord of the Treasury; Chancellor of the Exchequer | Henry Addington (head of ministry) | 17 March 1801 | 10 May 1804 | Tory |
| Lord Chancellor | Alexander Wedderburn, 1st Baron Loughborough | Continued | 14 April 1801 | Independent |
| Lord Chancellor | John Scott, 1st Baron Eldon | 14 April 1801 | Continued | Tory |
| Lord President of the Council | John Pitt, 2nd Earl of Chatham | Continued | 30 July 1801 | Independent |
| Lord President of the Council | William Cavendish-Bentinck, 3rd Duke of Portland | 30 July 1801 | Continued | Tory |
| Lord Privy Seal | John Fane, 10th Earl of Westmorland | Continued | Continued | Tory |
| Secretary of State for the Home Department | William Cavendish-Bentinck, 3rd Duke of Portland | Continued | 30 July 1801 | Tory |
| Secretary of State for the Home Department | Thomas Pelham, Baron Pelham of Stanmer | 30 July 1801 | 17 August 1803 | Tory |
| Secretary of State for the Home Department | Charles Philip Yorke | 17 August 1803 | 12 May 1804 | Tory |
| Secretary of State for Foreign Affairs | Robert Jenkinson, Baron Hawkesbury | Continued | 14 May 1804 | Tory |
| Secretary of State for War and the Colonies | Robert Hobart, Baron Hobart | 17 March 1801 | 12 May 1804 | Tory |
| First Lord of the Admiralty | John Jervis, 1st Earl of St Vincent | Continued | 1804 | Whig |
| Master-General of the Ordnance | John Pitt, 2nd Earl of Chatham | June 1801 | Continued | Independent |
| President of the Board of Trade | Charles Jenkinson, 1st Earl of Liverpool | Continued | 7 June 1804 | Independent |
| President of the Board of Control | George Legge, 3rd Earl of Dartmouth | May 1801 | July 1802 | Tory |
| President of the Board of Control | Robert Stewart, Viscount Castlereagh | July 1802 | Continued | Tory |

=== Changes ===
- May 1801 – George Legge, Lord Lewisham (from July Earl of Dartmouth) enters the Cabinet as President of the Board of Control.
- July 1801 – The William Cavendish-Bentinck, Duke of Portland succeeds John Pitt, Earl of Chatham as Lord President (Chatham remains Master of the Ordnance). Thomas Pelham, Lord Pelham of Stanmer succeeds Portland as Home Secretary.
- July 1802 – Robert Stewart, Lord Castlereagh succeeds Dartmouth at the Board of Control.
- August 1803 – Charles Philip Yorke succeeds Pelham as Home Secretary.

== Work cited ==
- Evans, Eric J. (2002). William Pitt the Younger. Routledge. ISBN 978-1-1347-8677-0.

| Preceded by First Pitt ministry | Government of the United Kingdom; 1801–1804 | Succeeded by Second Pitt ministry |
