= Second Pitt ministry =

Members of the government of the United Kingdom from 1804–1806

- 1804–1806
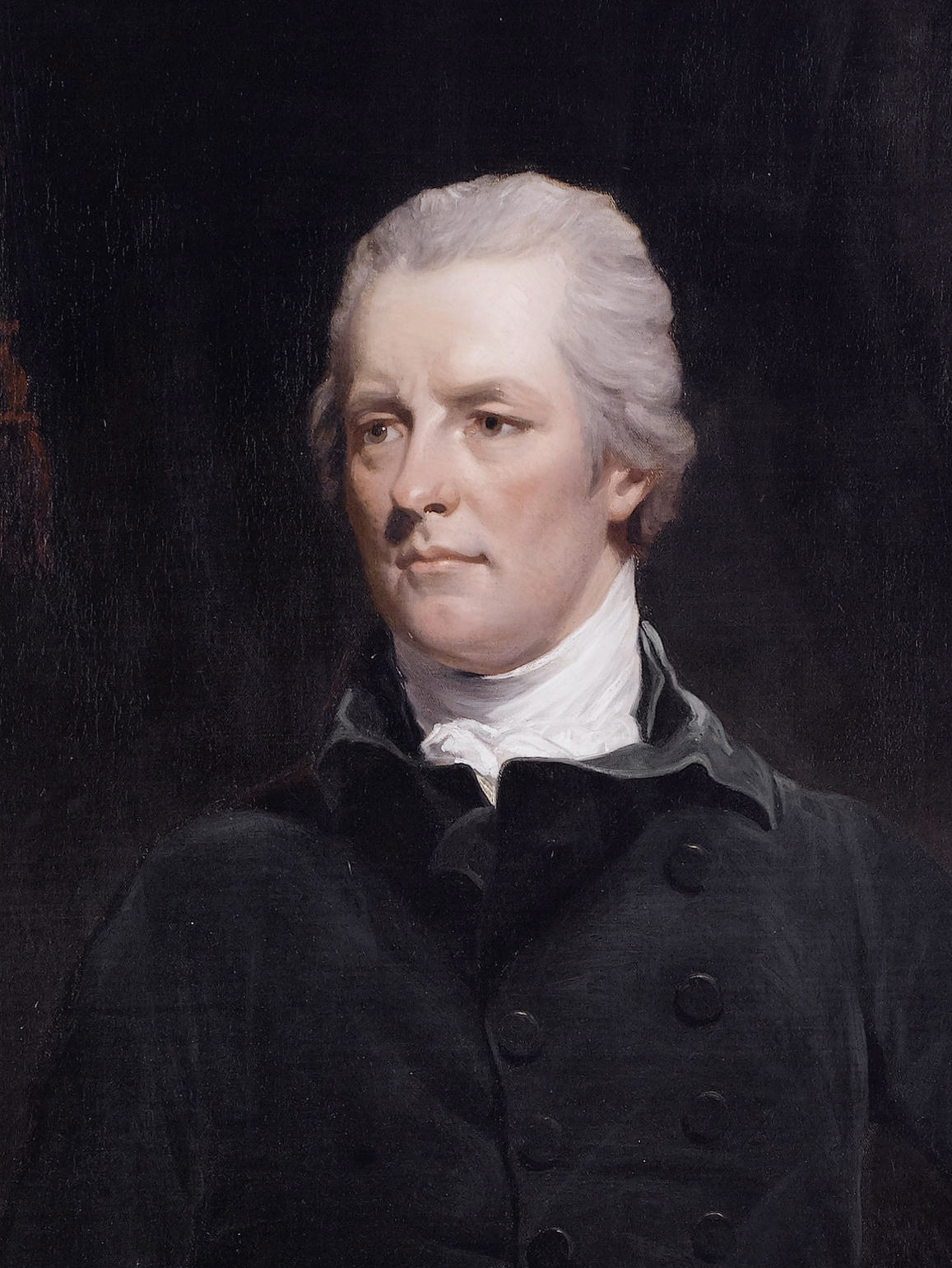
- Pitt by John Hoppner
- Date formed: 10 May 1804
- Date dissolved: 23 January 1806

People and organisations
- Monarch: George III
- Prime Minister: William Pitt the Younger
- Total no. of members: 19 appointments
- Member parties: Tory Party
- Status in legislature: Majority
- Opposition party: Whig Party
- Opposition leaders: Charles James Fox; Lord Grenville

History
- Legislature terms: 2nd UK Parliament
- Predecessor: Addington ministry
- Successor: Ministry of All the Talents

Former prime minister William Pitt the Younger reassumed the premiership of the United Kingdom of Great Britain and Ireland in 1804, succeeding Henry Addington as First Lord of the Treasury and Chancellor of the Exchequer. This second ministry was cut short by Pitt's 1806 death.

== Cabinet ==
Cabinet members
Portfolio	Minister	Took office	Left office	Party
First Lord of the Treasury; Chancellor of the Exchequer	William Pitt the Younger (head of ministry)	10 May 1804	23 January 1806	Tory
Lord Chancellor	John Scott, 1st Baron Eldon	Continued	7 February 1806	Tory
Lord President of the Council	William Cavendish-Bentinck, 3rd Duke of Portland	Continued	14 January 1805	Tory
Lord President of the Council	Henry Addington, 1st Viscount Sidmouth	14 January 1805	10 July 1805	Tory
Lord President of the Council	John Pratt, 2nd Earl Camden	10 July 1805	19 February 1806	Tory
Lord Privy Seal	John Fane, 10th Earl of Westmorland	Continued	5 February 1806	Tory
Secretary of State for Foreign Affairs	Dudley Ryder, 2nd Baron Harrowby	14 May 1804	11 January 1805	Tory
Secretary of State for Foreign Affairs	Henry Phipps, 3rd Baron Mulgrave	11 January 1805	7 February 1806	Tory
Secretary of State for the Home Department	Robert Jenkinson, Baron Hawkesbury	12 May 1804	5 February 1806	Tory
Secretary of State for War and the Colonies	John Pratt, 2nd Earl Camden	14 May 1804	10 July 1805	Tory
Secretary of State for War and the Colonies	Robert Stewart, Viscount Castlereagh	10 July 1805	5 February 1806	Tory
First Lord of the Admiralty	Henry Dundas, 1st Viscount Melville	1804	1805	Tory
First Lord of the Admiralty	Charles Middleton, 1st Baron Barham	1805	1806	Tory
Master-General of the Ordnance	John Pitt, 2nd Earl of Chatham	Continued	1806	Independent
President of the Board of Trade	James Graham, 3rd Duke of Montrose	7 June 1804	5 February 1806	Tory
President of the Board of Control	Robert Stewart, Viscount Castlereagh	Continued	11 February 1806	Tory
Chancellor of the Duchy of Lancaster	Henry Phipps, 3rd Baron Mulgrave	6 June 1804	14 January 1805	Tory
Chancellor of the Duchy of Lancaster	Robert Hobart, 4th Earl of Buckinghamshire	14 January 1805	10 July 1805	Tory
Chancellor of the Duchy of Lancaster	Dudley Ryder, 2nd Baron Harrowby	10 July 1805	12 February 1806	Tory
Minister without Portfolio	William Cavendish-Bentinck, 3rd Duke of Portland	January 1805	February 1806	Tory

=== Changes ===
- January 1805 –
  - Lord Mulgrave succeeds Lord Harrowby as Foreign Secretary.
  - Lord Buckinghamshire (Lord Hobart before November 1804) succeeds Mulgrave at the Duchy of Lancaster.
  - Lord Sidmouth succeeds the Duke of Portland as Lord President. Portland becomes a minister without portfolio.
- April 1805 – Lord Barham succeeds Lord Melville as First Lord of the Admiralty.
- July 1805 –
  - Lord Harrowby succeeds Lord Buckinghamshire as Chancellor of the Duchy of Lancaster.
  - Lord Camden succeeds Lord Sidmouth as Lord President.
  - Lord Castlereagh succeeds Camden as Colonial Secretary. He remains at the Board of Control.

Preceded by Addington ministry	Government of the United Kingdom; 1804–1806	Succeeded by Ministry of All the Talents
