= Quota System (Royal Navy) =

The Quota System (also known as The Quod), introduced by Prime Minister William Pitt the Younger in 1795, required each British county to provide a quota of men for the Royal Navy, based on its population and the number of its seaports: London, for example, had to provide 5,704 quotamen while Yorkshire had to provide 1,081.

The counties found it difficult to meet the quotas. Some offered high cash bounties to inexperienced volunteers (mostly inexperienced landsmen) and created resentment among the regular seamen, who, despite their experience, had received only a small fraction of that bounty on their own volunteering (and none if they were pressed). Sometimes, the counties resorted to sending convicted criminals in lieu of punishment, further creating ill feeling among ships' companies and sometimes introducing typhus (otherwise known as gaol fever).

Britain ended using the quota system, along with impressment, in 1815, at the close of the Napoleonic Wars, when much of the fleet was decommissioned, and the supply of unemployed seamen was more than adequate to man the remaining ships.
