= Thomas Clarges (disambiguation) =

Thomas Clarges (c. 1618–1695) was an English politician.

Thomas Clarges may also refer to:

- Sir Thomas Clarges, 2nd Baronet (1688–1759), MP for Lostwithiel
- Thomas Clarges (c. 1721–1753), of the Clarges baronets
- Sir Thomas Clarges, 3rd Baronet (1751–1782), MP for Lincoln
- Sir Thomas Clarges, 4th Baronet (c. 1780–1834)

== See also ==
- Clarges (disambiguation)
