= Gethin =

Gethin (Welsh pronunciation: [ˈɡɛθɨ̞n] or [ˈɡɛθɪn]) is a Welsh name with two possible origins. It may mean "dark-skinned, swarthy". In other cases it may originate as a familiar form of the Old Welsh name Grippiud (strong lord, from "cryf", strong, and "udd", lord or ruler), modern Gruffydd and Griffith. It may refer to:

== First name ==
- Gethin Davies, (born 1992), Welsh drummer of British Rock Band The Struts
- Gethin Jenkins (born 1980), Welsh rugby union player
- Gethin Jones (born 1978), Welsh television presenter
- Gethin Robinson (born 1982), Welsh rugby union player
- Gethin Roberts, activist, member of Lesbian and Gays Support the Miners

== Surname ==
- Ieuan Gethin (fl. c. 1350), Welsh-language poet
- Jessica Gethin, Australian conductor
- Martin Gethin (born 1983), English boxer
- Peter Gethin (1940–2011), English racing driver
- Rhys Gethin (died 1405), Welsh supporter of rebel Owain Glyndwr
- Sir Richard Gethin, 1st Baronet (born 1615), progenitor of the Gethin baronets
- Rupert Gethin (born 1957), British professor in Buddhist studies, president of the Pali Text Society
- Stanley Gethin (1875–1950), English cricketer, brother of William
- William Gethin (1877–1939), English cricketer

== See also ==
- Gethin baronets, a title in the peerage of Ireland
- Gething
- Vaughan Gething, a Welsh politician
- Gethins
