= Clarges =

Clarges may refer to:

== People ==
- Clarges baronets, extant from 1674 to 1834
- Robert Clarges (fl. 1713–1716), English Tory MP for Reading
- Thomas Clarges (disambiguation), multiple people, including:
  - Thomas Clarges (died 1695), English politician
  - Sir Thomas Clarges, 2nd Baronet (1688–1759), MP for Lostwithiel
  - Sir Thomas Clarges, 3rd Baronet (1751–1782), MP for Lincoln
- Verner Clarges (1846–1911), American actor of the silent era
- Sir Walter Clarges, 1st Baronet (1653–1705/6), English Tory politician

== Other uses ==
- Clarges Street, street in the City of Westminster, London
- To Live Forever (novel), 1956 science-fiction novel retitled Clarges
