= Richard Gethin =

Richard Gethin may refer to:

- Sir Richard Gethin, 1st Baronet (c. 1615-c. 1685), of the Gethin baronets, Privy Counsellor of Ireland
- Sir Richard Gethin, 2nd Baronet (1674–1709), of the Gethin baronets
- Sir Richard Gethin, 3rd Baronet (1698-c. 1765), of the Gethin baronets, High Sheriff of Sligo
- Sir Richard Gethin, 4th Baronet (c. 1725-c. 1778), of the Gethin baronets
- Sir Richard Gethin, 6th Baronet (1823–1885), of the Gethin baronets
- Sir Richard Charles Percy Gethin, 7th Baronet (1847–1921), of the Gethin baronets
- Sir Richard Walter St Lawrence Gethin, 8th Baronet (1878–1946), of the Gethin baronets
- Sir Richard Patrick St Lawrence Gethin, 9th Baronet (1911–1988), of the Gethin baronets
- Major Sir Richard Gethin, Sir Richard Joseph St Lawrence Gethin, 10th Baronet (born 1949), of the Gethin baronets

== See also ==
- Gethin
