= William Chaloner =

English counterfeiter and confidence trickster

- Born: 1650; Warwickshire, England
- Died: 22 March 1699 (aged 48–49); Tyburn, Middlesex, England
- Cause of death: Hung, drawn and quartered
- Occupations: Counterfeiter, coin clipper, confidence trickster, quack doctor
- Years active: 1690-1699
- Known for: Being proven guilty of high treason by Sir Isaac Newton, Warden of the Royal Mint, for counterfeiting currency
- Status: Dead
- Conviction: High treason
- Penalty: Death penalty and disembowelment
- Accomplices: Patrick Coffey, Thomas Taylor, Joseph Gravener, Thomas Holloway (and his wife), Thomas Carter, Aubrey Price

Details
- Victims: Royal Mint

William Chaloner (1650 – 22 March 1699) was a serial counterfeit coiner and confidence trickster, who was imprisoned in Newgate Prison several times and eventually proven guilty of high treason by Sir Isaac Newton, Warden of the Royal Mint. He was hanged on the gallows at Tyburn on 22 March 1699. The historian John Craig described Chaloner as "the most accomplished counterfeiter in the kingdom", remarking that he was "so nice an artist of dies that it galled him to spoil their perfection by use".

Chaloner grew up in a poor family in Warwickshire, but through a career in counterfeiting and con artistry attained great wealth, including a house in Knightsbridge. He started by forging "Birmingham Groats", then moved on to Guineas, French Pistoles, crowns and half-crowns, Banknotes and lottery tickets. At various times he also made and sold dildos and worked as a quack doctor, soothsayer, and sham anti-Jacobite "agent provocateur" to collect government rewards. In Guzman Redivivus, a posthumous biography published anonymously in 1699, it was stated that "scorning the 'petty Rogueries of Tricking single Men', he aimed rather at 'imposing upon a whole Kingdom'.

== Early life and scams ==
Chaloner was born in Warwickshire in 1650, the son of a weaver. His parents had great difficulty controlling him, so he was apprenticed to a nail maker in Birmingham, a town notorious for coining. At this time groats (worth four pennies) were in short supply, so the forged "Birmingham groat" constituted a significant proportion of the national coinage. Chaloner, a quick learner, became skilled in their production.

He soon demonstrated his ambition and, sometime in the 1680s, walked to London. The Craftsmens' Guild system prevented him finding gainful work, so he established himself by manufacturing and hawking "tin watches" [sic] containing dildos (Tin Watches, with D-does &c in 'em.) to cater for the sexually adventurous age. Thomas Levenson stated in Newton and the Counterfeiter that as early as 1660, two years after Oliver Cromwell’s death, "there were reports of imported Italian dildos being sold on St James's Street". (Note: In this period, "dildo" may also have referred to a decorative curlicue, although there is no obvious market-worthy opportunity for street sales of such items.))

Next he became a quack doctor and soothsayer. According to the anonymous, posthumous 1699 biography Guzman Redivivus:

having the best knack at Tongue-pudding", he established himself as a quack doctor and soothsayer, "pretending to tell sill' Wenches what sort of Husbands they should have, discovering Stol'n Goods &c

— Guzman Redivivus.

According to the Oxford National Dictionary of Biography "He may have been the 'William Chaloner' who on 31 March 1684 married Katharine Atkinson at St Katharine's by the Tower, and he had several children. This relatively respectable period of Chaloner's life ended when he was suspected of robbery and forced to flee his lodgings." His "trick" for recovering stolen property was "to steal it in the first place". As a result, he made his first appearance in the public record in 1690, as a suspect in a burglary case. But the "tongue-pudding" and the knack for playing two sides against each other were established as hallmarks of his increasingly large-scale criminal enterprises.

By early 1690 he was working as a japanner where he probably learned and practised the gilding process.

== Coining scams ==
English currency was in disarray in the late 17th century. Hand-struck silver coins from prior to 1662 had been clipped around the edges and thus their value (weight) reduced so that they were no longer a viable tender, especially abroad. The machine-struck silver coins produced by the Royal Mint in the Tower of London after 1662 were protected from clipping by an engraved, decorated and milled edge, but were instead forged, both by casting from counterfeit moulds and by die stamping from counterfeit dies. By 1696 forged coins constituted about 10% of the nation's currency.

The currency had a third problem: its value as silver bullion in Paris and Amsterdam was greater than the face value in London. Vast quantities of coins were melted and shipped abroad — an arbitrage market. New Acts of Parliament were passed in order to create the Bank of England and protect national military security. This situation prompted William Lowndes of the Treasury to ask Isaac Newton for help.

Chaloner was part of one of the many coining gangs that existed. He was taught the subtle techniques of moulding "milled edges" and counterfeiting coins by Patrick Coffey, a goldsmith. Thomas Taylor, a master engraver and printer, made the dies. In 1691, Chaloner produced French Pistoles worth about 17 shillings each, using an alloy of silver. Then he produced English guineas that were gilded by Patrick Coffey and Chaloner's own brother-in-law Joseph Gravener. The chain was completed by Thomas Holloway and his wife who passed the coins to petty crooks for circulation.

Chaloner was renowned in the coining community for the quality of his work and his prolific success. He purchased a large house in the semi-rural suburb of Knightsbridge, rode in a carriage, bought plate and dressed like a gentleman.

Isaac Newton noted that Chaloner was:

A Jappaner in clothes threadbare, ragged and daubed with colours, turned coiner and in a short time put on the habit of a gentleman.

Chaloner now abandoned his family and had affairs with female coiners, among them Joan Porter (fl. 1692–1699). It was in the guise of a knowledgeable but respectable citizen that he became able to "offer his services" to Parliament and the Royal Mint.

In mid-1692 William Blackford was condemned for passing out counterfeit guineas and denounced Chaloner, so he absconded until after Blackford was hanged.

His next scheme was for forgeries of the mint's "machine-struck" coins. He recruited Thomas Holloway and bought a house in Egham, Surrey, where the noise of coining and hot moulding machines would not be suspicious. It was also outside the legal boundary of London. Among the group was John Peers, a molten metal and moulding specialist. On 18 May 1697 he appeared before magistrates on an unrelated charge, and denounced Chaloner's Egham operation as part of his plea. Newton heard about this by accident three months later, so arrested Peers for questioning and then recruited him as an agent. Peers rejoined Holloway in Egham and produced 18 forged shillings, enabling Newton to arrest Holloway for coining.

An inventive coiner, Chaloner taught Thomas Holloway a new method of coining, using small, easily concealed stamps.

By the 1690s Chaloner had become:

... the most accomplished counterfeiter in the kingdom, .... so nice an artist of dies that it galled him to spoil their perfection by use.

— (Sir John Craig - Newton at the mint. (1946))

== Royal Mint scams ==
In December 1692 (or 1694) Chaloner increased his ambition and targeted the Royal Mint. He issued pamphlets describing a "solution"' to currency problems such as restrict/licence access to tools needed for coining; the coinage should be struck with an impression far deeper than coiners' tools or presses would allow; use a deep groove along the edge; extend the treason law; and adjust the silver value.

This attracted the interest of Charles Mordaunt, Earl of Peterborough, Earl of Monmouth ex-Lord of the Treasury, ex-king's confidant, who had fallen out of favour with William III of England in the 1690s. Mordaunt wanted an opportunity to attack what he saw as a weak Chancellor of the Exchequer, Charles Montagu, 1st Earl of Halifax. In 1695 Mordaunt arranged for Chaloner to address His Majesty's Most Honourable Privy Council about corrupt practices. This caused the Royal Mint to instigate its own investigations, which thwarted Chaloner's ambition to become its overseer.

In January 1696 Chaloner was in Newgate prison on suspicion of felony. Following his testimony to the Privy Council in 1695 and the Royal Mint's investigations, they had taken evidence from many petty criminals that incriminated him. On 13 January 1696 he petitioned Charles Montagu, Chancellor of the Exchequer, with details of a conspiracy at the Royal Mint. He was released from Newgate and on 3 February (or by May) testified to an investigative committee of Lord Justices in Whitehall about the crimes of the "moneyers" within the Mint. He claimed that they coined false guineas, struck debased blanks sent in from outside, and sent out stamps for coining (he boasted privately to have benefited from both), and regularly produced underweight coin. He named other coiners, Thomas Carter, John Abbot, and Patrick Coffee, including his own alias, "Chandler".

Chaloner testified that:

I never made a Guinea in my Life

—.

He claimed that the die stamps of the crypto-Jacobite chief engraver, John Roettiers the elder, were loaned out of the Tower, at a time during Newton's "complete recoining" of the nation's currency, an exercise that took until 1699, when £7 million of coins had been minted. He also claimed that many mint employees were corrupt and all were too specialised to spot security flaws in other people's areas. What the mint needed was an officer who understood smithing and coining work, but Parliament made him no offer. On 26 March a committee of council reported that Chaloner was himself involved in coining and should remain a prisoner.

At Parliament, by chance, he was recognised by Newton, leading to his arrest relating to the Egham coining operation and he was sent to Newgate. In order to bring a prosecution, Thomas Holloway was needed as a witness. From inside Newgate, Chaloner used a publican called Michael Gilligan to pay Holloway £20 to disappear to Scotland until the case collapsed. He was released seven weeks later.

== Anti-Jacobite scams ==
In 1693 he was tempted by Government rewards to act as an "agent provocateur", providing information about Jacobite activities, plots and printing presses. He paid four Jacobites to print a fresh edition of James II's declaration of May 1693. When Chaloner entertained them on 1 June, they were arrested while in possession of copies of the declaration and their press seized. His reward was £1,000.

In August 1693, accompanied by Aubrey Price, he unsuccessfully approached the government about a sham Jacobite plot to attack Dover Castle, offering to infiltrate the network as couriers so that they could read all the mail.

In 1697 Chaloner advised Aubrey Price that:

If [Price] would be ruled by [Chaloner] they would bubble the government, who were the easiest to be cheated of any men in the world.

— (Vernon, 1.366)

They approached the Government, via Sir Henry Colt, with a fabricated list of Jacobites in various countries. In June they were authorised to investigate further, despite erroneously including Williamites in the list. In August they accused Charles Talbot, 1st Duke of Shrewsbury, Secretary of State of helping Sir John Fenwick's escape in 1696 by providing a false pass. Shrewsbury forestalled this blackmail attempt by declaring it to the 'Lord Justices'.

Chaloner claimed an extensive anti-Jacobite role, including the capture of another press and the seizure of thirty-six different titles. He claimed to have discovered that a merchant, John Comyns, was remitting money to France. Chaloner spent five weeks in gaol spying on Jacobite prisoners, and allegedly spent £400 on bribes. However the prosecutions often failed.

Next, Chaloner proposed that Thomas Coppinger, or Matthew Coppinger, an unscrupulous thief-taker specializing in coining offences, should write a treasonable satire, and he would find a Jacobite printer whom they would jointly denounce to the authorities. In May 1694 Coppinger denounced Chaloner for coining and Lord Mayor Sir Thomas Stampe (Note: Caveat - The 'Oxford Dictionary of National Biography' states that Sir Thomas Stampe was responsible in 1694, but according to Wiki 'List of Lord Mayors of London' Sir Thomas Stampe was Lord Mayor of London in 1691, Sir Thomas Lant was Lord Mayor in 1694 and Sir John Houblon held the position in 1695) sent him to Newgate. Chaloner then turned the tables and testified against Coppinger, who was executed on 27 February 1695, or 22 February 1695.

he brought more Pupils [in coining] to the Gallows than all his Predecessors’, gaining some informal immunity for his own activities.

— Guzman Redivivus, 6–7.

== Bank of England scams ==
Chaloner's next target was the Bank of England which started trading in 1694 by taking deposits from the wealthy to lend to the government. (Note: Depositors could also manage their deposits via 3 transaction types: paper or passbooks to access accounts, promises of complete payment (bank cheques) to transfer payments to specific parties, and "bank-notes" to create running cash for partial payment among third parties. (the start of Fractional-reserve banking).) It introduced new £100 'bank notes' in May 1695, printed on partially marbled paper to prevent counterfeiting. After Chaloner learned of these notes, he ordered similar stock delivered to his Knightsbridge home, with which he printed £100 counterfeits, an act which, surprisingly, would not become a felony until 1697. The bank then discovered a forged note on 14 August 1695, and ceased their circulation within two months of their introduction. They traced the paper to a printer who unwittingly marbled the paper for Chaloner.

Chaloner immediately turned "King's evidence", surrendered his unused stock, named other conspirators to give him credibility, and exposed a major fraud against the bank, one presumably in which he was himself involved. He testified that blank bills on the "City orphans' fund" were cut from the cheque book in the "Chamber of London" by Aubrey Price, and the bank paid out amounts up to £1,000. (Note: John Gibbons, a porter of Whitehall Palace and a 'pursuer of coiners', arrested the swindlers in the Bank of England/City orphan fund scam. John Gibbons was known privately to Chaloner as an extortioner and operator of protection rackets.) For his 'efforts' Chaloner received formal thanks from the Bank of England, received a reward of £200 from the bank, and kept all of his profits from the counterfeiting.

An inventive counterfeiter, Chaloner had taught Aubrey Price how to counterfeit the new exchequer bills by altering the denominations after removing the old ink using a liquid that Chaloner had invented. Price was named by Chaloner, tried at the Old Bailey, and condemned to death for 'counterfeiting an excheque'. He was hanged at Tyburn on 22 June 1698.

In 1699 Chaloner allegedly told a prisoner in Newgate that:

... he had coined over 30,000 guineas and that there was no man in England better able to engrave forged plates for bills of exchange

— 1

== Lottery ticket scam ==
In 1698, Chaloner engraved a copperplate of tickets for the lottery on the "malt duty". Though this was not a felony, he covered his tracks and hid the plate between printing sessions. In August, another coiner, David Davis, betrayed the affair to James Vernon, under-secretary to Charles Talbot, 1st Duke of Shrewsbury, Secretary of State, whom he had attempted to blackmail in 1697, and a warrant/(bounty) was issued for Chaloner on 6 October.

In late October he was again arrested and imprisoned in Newgate, while Newton continued to gather evidence for his final trial. Chaloner immediately accused Thomas Carter, a longtime colleague, of engraving the plate and offered to surrender it in exchange for immunity.

== Trial and death ==
By January 1699 Newton was devoted to a complete investigation of Chaloner that would be water-tight. He used a comprehensive network of spies and informants, taking many statements from all his old contacts. The trial was held at the Old Bailey on 3 March. The Judge was Sir Salathiel Lovell, who had a reputation as a "hanging judge". Chaloner had to conduct his own defence without prior knowledge of Newton's case, evidence or witnesses, and no "presumption of innocence". He faced two indictments for treason—coining French pistoles in 1692, and coining crowns and half-crowns in 1698.

Newton fielded eight witnesses that spanned Chaloner's career. Catherine Coffey, wife of goldsmith Patrick Coffey, declared that she had seen him coin French Pistoles. Elizabeth Holloway declared how Chaloner had bribed her husband, the coiner Thomas Holloway, to flee to Scotland and avoid giving evidence at the 1697 trial. Thomas Taylor, the engraver in the major coining conspiracy. Catherine Carter, wife of Thomas Carter who had twice previously been named and blamed by Chaloner, testified to Chaloner's skill as a forger and his role in the lottery scam.

While in Newgate waiting for the trial, Chaloner had pretended to go mad. Newton noted that at first, ... Chaloner hath feigned himself mad. In court he resorted to insulting all parties and claiming they were committing perjury to save their own necks, and that anyway, the charges related to acts in the City and Surrey, outside the jurisdiction of the Middlesex sessions.

The jury needed only a few minutes to reach a verdict, and he was sentenced the next day. Over the following fortnight he wrote a series of letters to both Newton and Justice Railton, the Supervising Magistrate, that were in turn aggressive, blame shifting, begging, accusatory and rambling. None received a reply.

Chaloner's final letter to Newton concluded:

O Dear Sr do this mercifull deed O my offending you has brought this upon me O for Gods sake if not mine Keep me from being murdered O dear Sr nobody can save me but you O God my God I shall be murdered unless you save me O I hope God will move your heart with mercy pitty to do this thing for me I am Your near murdered humble Servant

—

Chaloner was hanged on the gallows at Tyburn on 22 March 1699, twitching and writhing for several minutes of the 'hangman's dance', whilst "stinking, wet, cold and mercilessly sober". Then, he was publicly disemboweled.

a Man, who had he squar'd his Talents by the Rules of Justice and Integrity, might have been useful to the Commonwealth; But as he follow'd only the Dictates of Vice, was as a rotten member cut off

— Guzman Redivivus. 1699.

== See also ==
- Catherine Murphy (counterfeiter) (died 1789) the last woman to be executed by burning.

== Sources ==
Sources listed by the Oxford Dictionary of National Biography, Oxford University Press, September 2004; Paul Hopkins and Stuart Handley.

- Guzman redivivus: a short view of the life of Will. Chaloner, the notorious coyner, who was executed at Tyburn on Wednesday the 22d of March 1698/9 (1699)
- The correspondence of Isaac Newton, ed. H. W. Turnbull and others, 7 vols. (1959–77), vol. 4
- Mint depositions, TNA: PRO, MINT 15/17
- Newton papers, TNA: PRO, MINT 19/1–3
- CSP dom.
- Letters illustrative of the reign of William III from 1696 to 1708 addressed to the duke of Shrewsbury by James Vernon, ed. G. P. R. James, 3 vols. (1841)
- Shrewsbury papers, Northants. RO, Buccleuch papers, vols. 46–7, 63 · JHC, 12–13 (1697–1702)
- Chaloner's petitions to William III, 1695, BL, Add. MS 72568, fols. 47–54
- E. Southwell's privy council minutes, BL, Add. MS 35107 · papers of the first earl of Portland, Nottingham UL, PwA
- William Arthur Shaw, ed., Calendar of treasury books, [33 vols. in 64], PRO (1904–69), vols. 10–14
- Bank of England Archives, London, F2/160, G4/2, G4/4
- Middlesex sessions rolls, gaol delivery, LMA, MJ/SR/1821–1925 (1693–9)
- Sessions rolls and minute books, 1694–9, CLRO, City of London, SF402–39; SM 65–7
- F. E. Manuel, A portrait of Isaac Newton (1968)
- R. S. Westfall, Never at rest: a biography of Isaac Newton (1980)
- N. Luttrell, A brief historical relation of state affairs from September 1678 to April 1714, 6 vols. (1857)
- W. Chaloner, To the honourable, the knights, citizens and burgesses in parliament assembled: proposals humby offered, for passing, an act to prevent clipping and counterfeiting of money (1695)
- W. Chaloner, The defects in the present constitution of the mint, humbly offered to the consideration of the present House of Commons [1697]
- W. Chaloner, To the honourable the knights, citizens and burgesses in parliament assembled. Reasons humbly offered against passing an act for raising ten hundred thousand pounds, to make good the deficiency of the clipt-money [1694]
- H. Haynes, ‘Brief memoires relating to the silver and gold coins of England’, 1700, BL, Lansdowne MS. 801
- Report on the manuscripts of the marquis of Downshire, 6 vols. in 7, HMC, 75 (1924–95), vol. 1
- Sir W. Trumbull's diary, BL, Add. MS 72571
- J. M. Beattie, Policing and punishment in London, 1660–1750 (2001)
- [H. Fitzgerald's examination], 1699, BL, Add. MS 21136, fols. 71–2
- C. E. Challis, ed., A new history of the royal mint (1992)
- J. Craig, Newton at the mint (1946)
- Middlesex sessions papers, Feb. 1695, LMA, MJ/SP/1695/02/028–035, 02/006
- J. Redington, ed., Calendar of Treasury papers, 1–2, PRO (1868–71)
- T. Wales, ‘Thief-takers and their clients in later Stuart London’, Londinopolis: essays in the social and cultural history of early modern London, ed. P. Griffiths and N. G. R. Jenner (2000), 67–84

== Further listening ==
- BBC Radio 4, Book of the Week, September 2009, Newton and the Counterfeiter by Thomas Levenson
- BBC Radio 4 - The King's Coiner: The True Story of Isaac Newton, Detective. A radio drama by Philip Palmer. BBC Radio Afternoon Theatre. Producer: Toby Swift.
