= James Hammond (author) =

English poet and politician (1710–1742)

James Hammond (22 May 1710 – 7 June 1742) was an English poet and politician.

== Life ==
Born on 22 May 1710, he was the second son of Anthony Hammond of Somersham Place, Huntingdonshire, who married Jane, only daughter of Sir Walter Clarges. His mother was famous for her wit; the father was a wit, politician, and spendthrift. Hammond was educated at Westminster School; at about the age of 18 Noel Broxholme, his future brother-in-law, introduced him to Lord Chesterfield. He soon became a member of the clique around Frederick, Prince of Wales: Cobham, Lyttelton, and Pitt.

In 1733 his relative Nicholas Hammond left Hammond £400 a year, and he became attached to the prince's court as an equerry. Through the prince's influence, as Duke of Cornwall, Hammond was returned to parliament on 13 May 1741 as member for Truro. Hammond then fell into bad health, and died at Stowe House in Buckinghamshire on 7 June 1742, while on a visit to Lord Cobham.

Erasmus Lewis was left sole executor, but he declined to act, and Hammond's mother administered the estate.

== Works ==
Hammond wrote elegies, avowed imitations of Tibullus. By popular tradition, which has been doubted, he was in love with Kitty Dashwood, later a bedchamber woman to Queen Charlotte. The volume of poems was entitled Love Elegies by Mr. H——nd. Written in the year 1732. With Preface by the E. of C——d., 1743, in which Chesterfield wrote a tribute. The elegies were included in Samuel Johnson's, Robert Anderson's, and Alexander Chalmers's collections of English poets; and were often republished, for example by Thomas Park in 1805 and George Dyer in 1818.

The poems were mostly inscribed to Neæra or to Delia, but one was in praise of George Grenville, and another was pointedly addressed to Kitty Dashwood, and to this Lady Mary Wortley Montagu wrote an answer, printed in Dodsley's collection, iv. 73–8.

In 1740 Hammond had written a prologue for George Lillo's posthumous tragedy of Elmerick, which was acted at Drury Lane Theatre, and some additional poems by him and references to his compositions were in the Gentleman's Magazine for 1779, 1781, 1786, and 1787.

== Notes ==
Attribution

This article incorporates text from a publication now in the public domain: Courtney, William Prideaux (1890). "Hammond, James". Dictionary of National Biography. Vol. 24. pp. 246–247.
