= Henry Colt =

Henry Colt may refer to:

- Harry Colt, Henry Colt, golf course architect
- Sir Henry Colt, 1st Baronet, MP for Newport (Isle of Wight) and Westminster
- Sir Henry Archer Colt, 9th Baronet (1882–1951), of the Colt baronets

== See also ==
- Colt (surname)
