= Anthony Hammond (politician) =

English official and Tory politician

Anthony Hammond (1668–1738), of Somersham Place, Somersham, Huntingdonshire and Lidlington, Bedfordshire, was an English official and Tory politician who sat in the English and British House of Commons between 1695 and 1708. He was also known as a poet and pamphleteer.

== Early life ==
Hammond was born on 1 September 1668, the eldest son of Anthony Hammond, D.L., of Somersham Place, Somersham, Huntingdonshire, who was the third son of Anthony Hammond (1608–1661) of St Alban's Court, Nonington, Kent. His mother was Amy Browne (died 1693), daughter of Henry Browne of Hasfield House, Gloucestershire. He was educated at home under Mr Kay from 1675 to 1676, at Willingham, Cambridgeshire under Samuel Saywell from 1676 to 1683 and at St Paul's School from 1684 to 1685. He succeeded his father, who died in 1680 and has a monument in Somersham church.

He was admitted at Gray's Inn in 1684 and at St John's College, Cambridge in 1685. It was told that he smuggled the actress and playwright Susanna Centlivre into his college, where she was disguised as a male cousin, "Jack". There (by this report) she remained hidden for some months studying grammar. He made many and varied friendships with political and literary figures. He entered the company of radical Whig theorists, including Walter Moyle. Through Moyle he probably came into the circle of Tory and Whig ideologues and virtuosi who gathered at the Grecian Coffee House in the Strand, in London.

When he came of age in 1689, Hammond was appointed to the Huntingdonshire lieutenancy and was made a colonel in the county militia. He was probably included on the commission of the peace. He was elected a Conservator to the Board of the Bedford Level Corporation, becoming a Bailiff of that company (in the place of Roger Jenyns, Surveyor General of the Fens, deceased) in 1693: he surrendered his bailiwick to James Fortrey in 1704, but resumed his place as a Conservator until 1712, when his duties of service in Spain prevented his further active participation upon the committee.

In 1690, he travelled abroad in the Low Countries. From February to September 1694, he was captain of foot in Thomas Farrington's regiment. He married Jane Clarges, daughter of Sir Walter Clarges, 1st Baronet, at Tunbridge Wells, Kent, on 14 August 1694. That was a family prominent in politics, which included leading members of the Tory party. Hammond was a regular guest at the Surrey home of Sir Walter Clarges, who was similarly acquainted with the Grecian Tavern set.

== Parliamentary career ==
At the 1695 English general election, Hammond was returned as Tory Member of Parliament for Huntingdonshire in a hard-fought contest. He voted in March 1696 against fixing the price of guineas at 22 shillings, and refused to subscribe the Association which lost him his position on the commission of peace. He was active in opposing the attainder of Sir John Fenwick.

After a quarrel that arose during a debate in the committee of privileges over the Cambridgeshire election, he fought a duel with Lord William Powlett on 27 January 1697/98, and was wounded in the thigh. In parliament he spoke principally on financial questions. At the 1698 English general election, Hammond was returned as MP for the University of Cambridge, and was made M.A. as a member of St John's College. Shortly afterward, he published anonymously Considerations upon the choice of a Speaker of the House of Commons in the approaching Session, in which he tacitly recommended Robert Harley for the office of Speaker against Sir Edward Seymour and Sir Thomas Littleton. Littleton was elected Speaker on 6 December 1698. This tract has been often reprinted.

Hammond was elected a Fellow of the Royal Society 30 November 1698 and admitted 30 October 1700, but had withdrawn by 1718. He was returned again as MP for Cambridge University at the first general election of 1701. In September, however, when dining in a Haymarket tavern with Tory friends Charles Davenant and John Tredenham, he was compromised when they were unexpectedly joined by the French chargé d'affaires Chevalier Jean-Baptiste de Poussin, upon which the Whigs built great political capital against him. At the November general election of 1701, he was defeated by Isaac Newton, although Edward Villiers, 1st Earl of Jersey, Lord Chamberlain, had written to the university in his favour. He found consolation in penning some Considerations upon Corrupt Elections of Members to serve in Parliament in 1701.

On 17 June 1701, he had been appointed a commissioner for stating the public accounts. Under Godolphin's administration he was made a Commissioner of the Navy in May 1702, and again entered parliament as member for Huntingdon at the 1702 English general election. At the 1708 British general election, he was returned for New Shoreham, Sussex, but on the ensuing 7 December the House decided by a majority of eighteen that, as commissioner of the navy and employed in the out ports, he was incapable of being elected or of voting as a member of the house, and therefore a new writ was ordered the next day.

== From paymaster to debtor ==
In 1711, Hammond left England to take up his appointment as deputy-paymaster or treasurer of the British forces in Spain. The Duke of Argyll, commander-in-chief, complained of him for irregularity. Paymaster Hon. James Brydges, however, upheld Hammond in a report to Lord Treasurer Dartmouth, dated 11 November 1712, justifying the payments made by him to Portuguese troops.

Following his arrest for debt in 1714 his affairs became hopelessly involved. According to Thomas Hearne, Hammond attempted to assassinate the Old Pretender in 1715. He was frequently in debtors' prison during his later life, where he occupied himself with literary pursuits. Retiring to the Fleet Prison, he was able to preserve the remains of his estate for his eldest son. Hearne wrote of him, "...at present a prisoner for debt in the King's Bench, and prostitutor of his pen for bread..." Thomas Cooke, translator of Hesiod, who made Hammond's acquaintance in 1722, wrote of him:

"He was a well-bred man, had but a small portion of solid understanding, and was a great flatterer. He was a pleasant story-teller, and seldom sad. He courted men of letters and genius, and was fond of being taken notice of by them in their writings. He would ask them to mention him in their works: he asked it of me."

=== Later works ===
In 1720, Hammond edited A New Miscellany of Original Poems, Translations, and Imitations, by the Most Eminent Hands, viz. Mr. Prior, Mr. Pope, Mr. Hughes, Mr. Harcourt, Lady M[ary] W[ortley] M[ontagu], Mrs. Manley, &c., now first published from their respective manuscripts. With some Familiar Letters, by the late Earl of Rochester, never before printed: in the 'Preface' he claimed as his own some pieces which had been ascribed to others, including the Ode on Solitude attributed to the Earl of Roscommon.

In 1721, he permitted the publication of his Solitudinis Munus: or, Hints for Thinking. He also wrote a reasoned retrospect of the South Sea Bubble year, entitled A Modest Apology. He remarked that he had made a list of 107 bubbles with a nominal stock of £93,600,000, involving a loss of £14,040,000.

Hammond prefixed to Walter Moyle's Works (1727) a memoir (signed 'A.H.'): they had been intimate friends from 1690. Hammond contributed a 'character' of Edward Russell, 1st Earl of Orford to The Present State of the Republick of Letters for October 1730, from which Robert Samber drew his information for a verse eulogy on Orford in 1731: also he wrote another financial pamphlet entitled The National Debt as it stood at Michaelmas 1730, stated and explained.

His Collections and Extracts relating to the Affairs of the Nation, with an Autobiographical Diary, extending from 1660 to 1730, is preserved in the Bodleian Library. There are numerous Hammond manuscripts among the Rawlinson Collection at the Bodleian, and others among the Portland, Cowper and Stuart papers in the Historical Manuscripts Commission.

== Death and issue ==
Hammond died in the Fleet in 1738, but his estate was not administered until 8 April 1749. His wife died in 1749. They had two surviving sons:

- Thomas Hammond, who died childless about 1758. His father's estate was settled on Thomas in 1725, and he and his mother Amy purchased several estates dependant on Somersham formerly held by copyhold. He received a grant of the manor of Somersham in 1741, and sold it in 1743 in trust to Robert, Duke of Manchester.
- James Hammond (1710–1742), poet and politician,

and three surviving daughters including

- Amy Hammond, who married first, in 1719, William Dowdeswell of Pull Court, Worcestershire; and secondly, on 7 May 1730 at Knightsbridge, Noel Broxholme, M.D. Amy Broxolme died in 1754 making bequests to her sons William Dowdeswell and George Dowdeswell.

He wrote a short character-sketch of himself which was published in 1809.

Parliament of England
Preceded by John Proby; John Dryden	Member of Parliament for Huntingdonshire; 1695–1698; With: Heneage Montagu; Robert Apreece	Succeeded by John Proby; Robert Throckmorton
Preceded by Henry Boyle; George Oxenden	Member of Parliament for Cambridge University; 1698–1701; With: Henry Boyle	Succeeded by Henry Boyle; Isaac Newton
Preceded by Francis Wortley-Montagu; The Earl of Orrery	Member of Parliament for Huntingdon; 1702–1705; With: The Earl of Orrery	Succeeded by Edward Wortley Montagu; Sir John Cotton, 4th Bt
Parliament of Great Britain
Preceded by John Wicker; Nathaniel Gould	Member of Parliament for New Shoreham; 1708; With: Richard Lloyd	Succeeded by Sir Gregory Page; Richard Lloyd
