= Henry Boyle, 1st Baron Carleton =

Irish politician

The Right Honourable The Lord Carleton PC
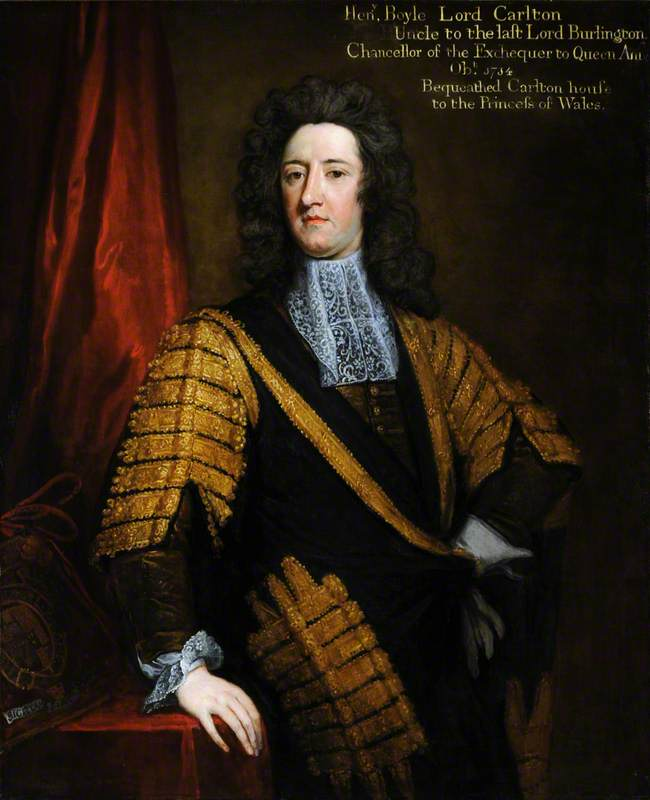
- Portrait by Godfrey Kneller

Lord President of the Council
- In office 25 June 1721 – 27 March 1725
- Monarch: George I
- Preceded by: Viscount Townshend
- Succeeded by: The Duke of Devonshire

Personal details
- Born: 12 July 1669
- Died: 14 March 1725 (aged 55)
- Education: Westminster School
- Alma mater: Trinity College, Cambridge

Henry Boyle, 1st Baron Carleton, PC (12 July 1669 – 14 March 1725) was an Anglo-Irish Whig politician who sat in the Irish House of Commons from 1692 to 1695 and in the English and British House of Commons between 1689 and 1710. He served as Chancellor of the Exchequer and Secretary of State, and after he was raised to the peerage as Baron Carleton, served as Lord President of the council.

== Biography ==
Boyle was the son of Charles Boyle, 3rd Viscount Dungarvan, and his first wife Lady Jane Seymour, daughter of William Seymour. He was educated at Westminster School and travelled abroad from 1685 to 1688, attending Padua University in 1685. He entered the army under the auspices of his uncle, the Tory politician Lord Rochester. However, Boyle himself became a Whig, and in 1688 deserted the army of James II in favour of the Prince of Orange.

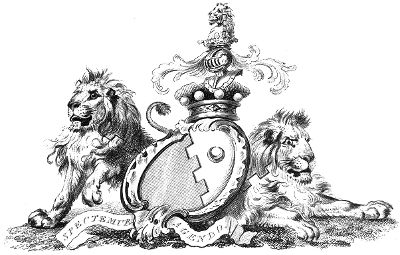
Arms of Baron Carleton.

In 1689, he was elected Member of Parliament for Tamworth, but was defeated the next year. He spent the next two years in Ireland managing the family estates and represented County Cork in the Irish House of Commons in 1692. Also in 1692, he was returned as MP for Cambridge University at a by election on 21 November 1692, having been admitted at Trinity College, Cambridge on 9 November, and was awarded MA in 1693. He became a prominent spokesman of the "country" opposition, but in 1697 he switched to the court party. Here he advanced quickly, becoming a Lord of the Treasury in 1699 and Chancellor of the Exchequer of England in 1701.

Boyle picked up other offices during his career, becoming Lord Lieutenant of the West Riding of Yorkshire and Lord Treasurer of Ireland in 1704, and was elected member for Westminster at the 1705 English general election. With the departure of Harley and his followers from the government, Boyle became Secretary of State for the Northern Department and Lord Treasurer Godolphin's principal lieutenant in the Commons. His and Godolphin's dominance in the ministry was increasingly overshadowed by the power of the Junto of Whig aristocrats, however, and in 1710 he retired from office and withdrew from politics with the arrival of Harley's new Tory ministry.

== Baron Carleton ==
With the Hanoverian succession in 1714, Boyle was raised to the peerage as Baron Carleton, and became Lord President in 1721, an office in which he continued until his death in 1725.

Carlton Way, a road in north Cambridge that follows the path of the Roman Akeman Street, and the public house The Carlton Arms on the same road, are named after him.

Parliament of Ireland
Unknown	Member of Parliament for County Cork; 1692–1695; With: St John Brodrick	Succeeded by Sir St John Brodrick; Thomas Brodrick
Parliament of England
Preceded by Sir Robert Sawyer; Edward Finch	Member of Parliament for Cambridge University; 1692–1705; With: Edward Finch 1692–1695; George Oxenden 1695–1698; Anthony Hammond 1698–1701; Isaac Newton 1701–1702; Arthur Annesley 1702–1705	Succeeded by Arthur Annesley; Dixie Windsor
Preceded by Sir Walter Clarges, Bt; Sir Thomas Crosse	Member of Parliament for Westminster; 1705 – 1707; With: Sir Henry Dutton Colt, Bt	Parliament of England abolished
Parliament of Great Britain
New parliament	Member of Parliament for Westminster; 1707 – 1710; With: Sir Henry Dutton Colt, Bt 1707–1708; Thomas Medlycott 1708–1710	Succeeded by Thomas Medlycott; Sir Thomas Crosse
Political offices
Preceded by The 2nd Earl of Burlington	Lord Treasurer of Ireland; 1704–1715	Succeeded by The 3rd Earl of Burlington
Preceded by John Smith	Chancellor of the Exchequer; 1701–1708	Succeeded by John Smith
Preceded by Robert Harley	Northern Secretary; 1708–1710	Succeeded by Henry St John
Preceded by The Viscount Townshend	Lord President of the Council; 1721–1725	Succeeded by The Duke of Devonshire
Honorary titles
Preceded by The 2nd Earl of Burlington	Lord Lieutenant of the West Riding of Yorkshire; 1704–1715	Succeeded by The 3rd Earl of Burlington
Preceded by The 2nd Earl of Burlington	Vice-Admiral of Yorkshire; 1704–1715	Succeeded by The 3rd Earl of Burlington
Preceded by The 2nd Earl of Burlington	Custos Rotulorum of the North Riding of Yorkshire; 1704–1715	Succeeded by The 3rd Earl of Burlington
Peerage of Great Britain
New creation	Baron Carleton; 1714–1725	Extinct
