= Gething =

Gething is a surname, and may refer to:

- Amelia Gething (born 1999), English actress and writer
- David Gething, Australian ultramarathoner based in Hong Kong
- Glyn Gething (1892–1977), Welsh rugby union player
- Michael Gething (born 1967), Australian judge
- Richard Gething (c.1585–c.1652), English calligrapher
- Vaughan Gething (born 1974), Zambia-born Welsh politician

== See also ==
- Gething Caulton (1895–1976), British bishop in Oceania
- Gething coalfield in Alberta, Canada
- Gething Formation in western Canada
- Gethin
