= Edward Colt =

Edward Colt may refer to:

- Edward Colt, of the Colt baronets
- Edward Colt, character in Wimbledon (film)
