= John Colt =

John Colt may refer to:

== Baronets ==
- Sir John Dutton Colt, 2nd Baronet (1725–1809), of the Colt baronets
- Sir John Dutton Colt, 3rd Baronet (c. 1750–1810), of the Colt baronets
- Sir John Dutton Colt, 4th Baronet (1774–1845), of the Colt baronets

== Others ==
- Johnny Colt, American musician
- John Dutton Colt, MP for Leominster (UK Parliament constituency)
- John C. Colt, fur-trader, book keeper, law clerk, teacher and Marine

== See also ==
- Colt (surname)
