= John Smith (Chancellor of the Exchequer) =

English politician (1656–1723)

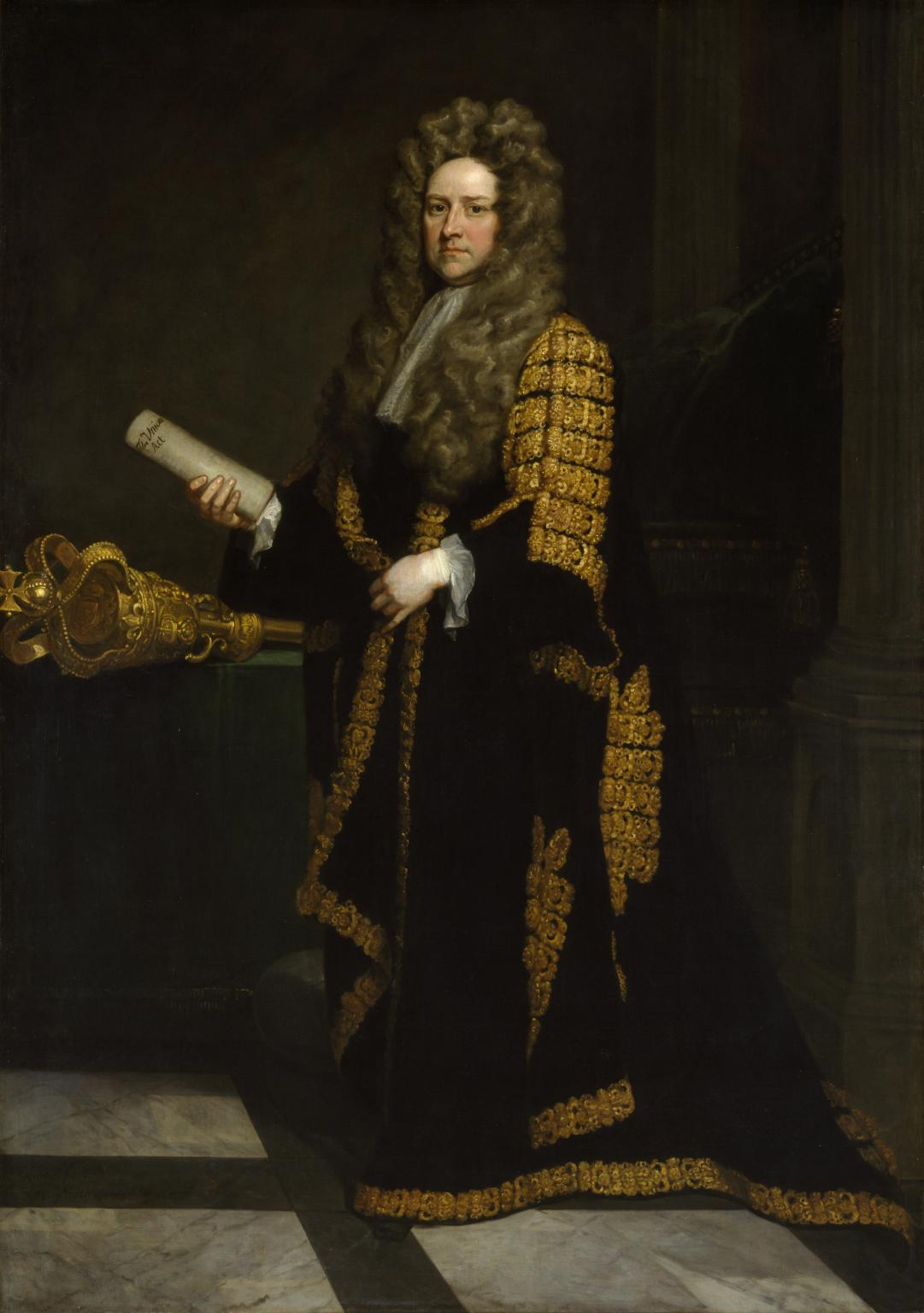
- Portrait of John Smith by Godfrey Kneller, 1708

Chancellor of the Exchequer
- In office 2 June 1699 – 27 March 1701
- Monarch: William III
- Preceded by: Charles Montagu
- Succeeded by: Henry Boyle
- In office 22 April 1708 – 11 August 1710
- Monarch: Anne
- Preceded by: Henry Boyle
- Succeeded by: Robert Harley

Speaker of the House of Commons of Great Britain
- In office 23 October 1705 – 1708
- Monarch: Anne
- Preceded by: Robert Harley
- Succeeded by: Richard Onslow
Parliamentary offices
Member of the Habeas Corpus Parliament for Ludgershall
In office 1679–1679 Serving with Thomas Neale
| Preceded by | William Ashburnham; George Legge |
| Succeeded by | Thomas Neale; John Garrard |
In office 1689–1690 Serving with John Deane
| Preceded by | Henry Clerke; Thomas Neale |
| Succeeded by | Thomas Neale; John Deane |
Member of Parliament for Bere Alston
In office 1691–1695 Serving with: John Swinfen 1691–1694; Henry Hobart 1694–1695
| Preceded by | Francis Drake; John Swinfen |
| Succeeded by | John Elwill; Henry Hobart |
Member of Parliament for Andover
In office 1695–1707 Serving with: Robert Smyth 1695–1698; Anthony Henley 1698–1701; Francis Shepheard 1701–1708; William Guidott 1708–1713
| Preceded by | Francis Powlett; John Pollen |
| Succeeded by | William Guidott; Ambrose Crowley |
Member of Parliament for East Looe
In office 1715–1724 Serving with: James Bateman 1715–1718; Horatio Walpole 1718–1722; William Lowndes 1722–1724
| Preceded by | Charles Hedges; Edward Jennings |
| Succeeded by | George Cholmondeley; William Lowndes |

John Smith (1656–1723) of Tedworth House, Hampshire, was an English politician who sat in the English and British House of Commons between 1678 and 1723. He served as Speaker and twice as Chancellor of the Exchequer.

== Early life ==
Smith was the fourth, but only surviving, son of John Smith of Tedworth House, South Tidworth, Hampshire and his wife Mary Wright, daughter of Sir Edmund Wright, alderman, of London. His sister Anne married Sir Samuel Dashwood, MP and Lord Mayor of London. He matriculated at St John's College, Oxford, on 18 May 1672, aged 16, and was admitted at the Middle Temple in 1674. His father died in 1690. He succeeded to his estate, and then to the estate of his uncle Thomas Smith in 1692.

== Career ==
Smith was a moderate Whig. He was first elected as Member of Parliament for Ludgershall at a contest in February 1679, but was defeated in the second election of the year in August. He stood again in 1681, and there was a double return, which was only resolved after the end of that Parliament. In 1689 he was returned unopposed as MP for Ludgershall.

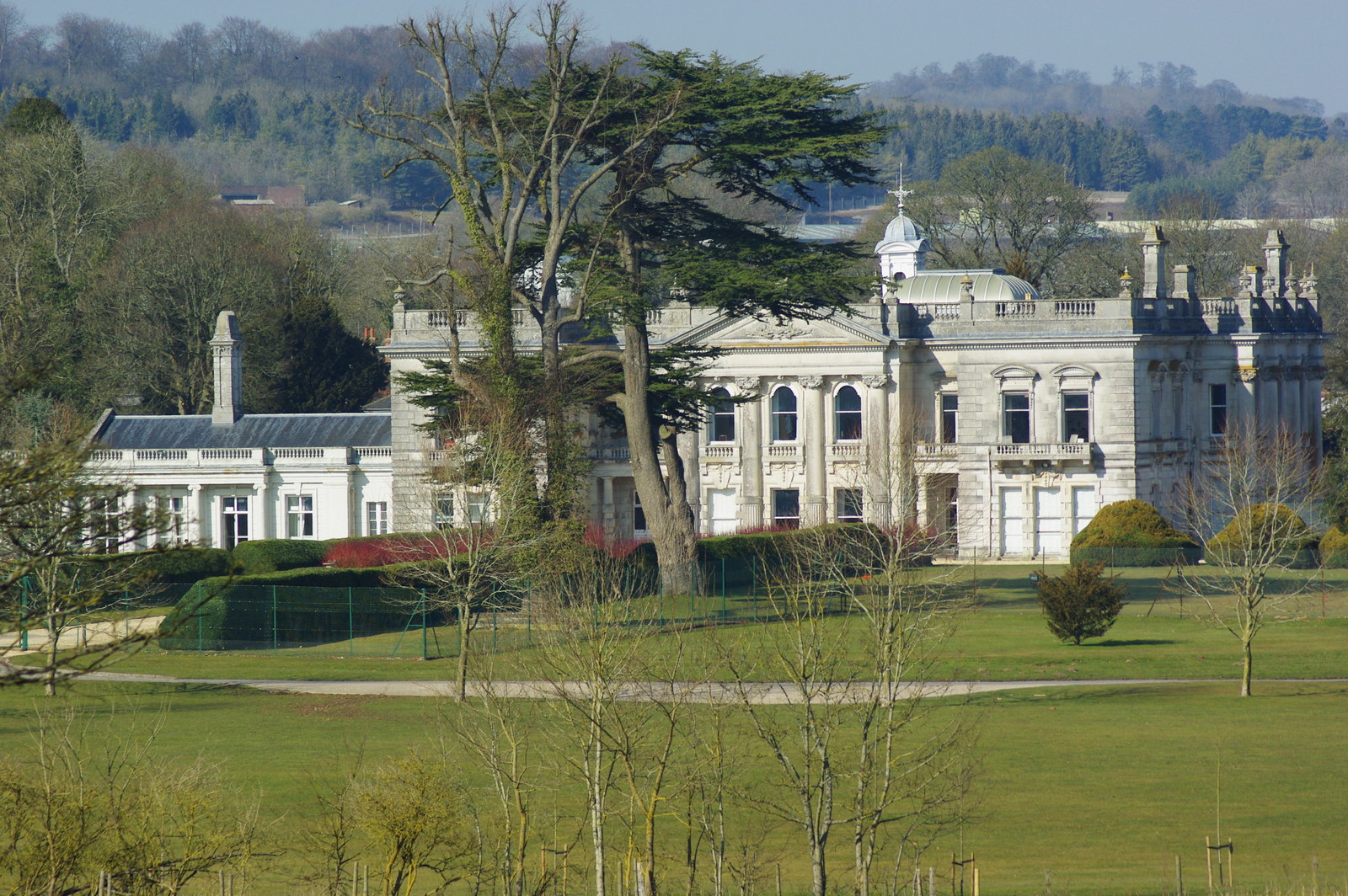
Tedworth House, as rebuilt in the 19th century

Smith was returned as MP for Bere Alston at a by-election on 15 December 1691. In 1694 he was appointed as a Lord of the Treasury and became a Privy Councillor on 23 May 1695. At the 1695 general election he was returned unopposed as MP for Andover. From 1695 to 1697 he was a Commissioner for Prize Appeals. He was returned unopposed again as MP for Andover at the 1698 general election. On 2 June 1699 he became Chancellor of the Exchequer. He was elected as MP for Andover again at the first general election of 1701, but although he was asked to continue as Chancellor, felt uncomfortable in a changed Parliament and resigned on 27 March 1701. In the second general election of 1701 and in that of 1702 he was re-elected MP for Andover. He was returned unopposed for Andover at the 1705 general election and was chosen as Speaker of the House of Commons in 1705. In 1706 he was a Commissioner for the Union with Scotland, and was the last Speaker of the House of Commons of England. After the Acts of Union 1707, he became the first Speaker of the new House of Commons of Great Britain. He was proposed for this position by his joint partner in the Company of Scotland, Francis Montgomerie of Giffen.

At the 1708 general election Smith was returned unopposed as MP for Andover, and subsequently gave up his position as Speaker when he was appointed Chancellor of the Exchequer again on 22 April 1708. He ceased to be Chancellor at the dissolution of Parliament on 11 August 1710, and was returned unopposed for Andover at the 1710 election. He was then appointed to the lucrative post of Teller of the Exchequer. He refused to stand for Parliament at the 1713 election, offended by suggestions that the ministry had him under control. His post of Teller was renewed in 1714 and he held it for the rest of his life.

Smith was returned as Member of Parliament for East Looe at the general elections in 1715 and 1722.

== Personal life ==
He married Anne Steward, daughter of Sir Nicholas Steward, 1st Baronet, of Hartley Mauditt, Hampshire on 1 September 1679. Anne died in 1680 and he married secondly Anne Strickland, daughter of Sir Thomas Strickland of Boynton, Yorkshire by licence dated 7 November 1683.

Smith died on 2 October 1723 and was buried in the old church at South Tidworth. He and his second wife had four sons and three daughters, including Mary Smith and Anne Smith, Lady Grant. His son Thomas was also a Whig Member of Parliament.

Coat of arms of John Smith
| Escutcheon Quarterly: 1st & 4th: azure, two bars between three pheons or (for Smith) 2nd & 3rd: Argent, a mullet pierced sable (for Assheton) |

Political offices
| Preceded by Charles Montagu | Chancellor of the Exchequer of England; 1699–1701 | Succeeded by Hon. Henry Boyle |
| Preceded by Robert Harley | Speaker of the House of Commons of England; 1705–1706 | Parliament of England abolished |
| New post | Speaker of the House of Commons of Great Britain; 1707–1708 | Succeeded by Richard Onslow |
| Preceded by Hon. Henry Boyle | Chancellor of the Exchequer of Great Britain; 1708–1710 | Succeeded by Robert Harley |
| Preceded by James Vernon | Teller of the Exchequer; 1710–1712 | Succeeded by The Lord Mansel |
| Preceded by The Lord Mansel | Teller of the Exchequer; 1714–1723 | Vacant Title next held by George Treby |
Parliament of England
| Preceded by William Ashburnham; George Legge | Member of Parliament for Ludgershall; 1679; With: Thomas Neale | Succeeded by Thomas Neale; John Garrard |
| Preceded by Henry Clerke; Thomas Neale | Member of Parliament for Ludgershall; 1689–1690; With: John Deane | Succeeded by John Deane; Thomas Neale |
| Preceded by Sir Francis Drake; John Swinfen | Member of Parliament for Bere Alston; 1691–1695; With: John Swinfen 1691–1694; Sir Henry Hobart 1694–1695 | Succeeded by John Elwill; Sir Henry Hobart |
| Preceded by Francis Powlett; John Pollen | Member of Parliament for Andover; 1695–1707; With: Sir Robert Smyth 1695–1698; Anthony Henley 1698–1701; Francis Shepheard 1701–1707 | Succeeded by Parliament of Great Britain |
Parliament of Great Britain
| Preceded by Parliament of England | Member of Parliament for Andover; 1707–1713; With: Francis Shepheard 1707–1708; William Guidott 1708–1713 | Succeeded by William Guidott; Sir Ambrose Crowley |
| Preceded by Sir Charles Hedges; Edward Jennings | Member of Parliament for East Looe; 1715–1724; With: Sir James Bateman 1715–1718; Horatio Walpole 1718–1722; William Lowndes 1722–1724 | Succeeded by Viscount Malpas; William Lowndes |
