= Gethins =

Gethins is a surname. Notable people with the surname include:

- Conor Gethins (born 1983), Irish footballer
- Stephen Gethins (born 1976), Scottish politician

== See also ==
- Gethin
