= Sir John Crosse, 2nd Baronet =

British Whig politician

Sir John Crosse, 2nd Baronet (c. 1700 – 12 March 1762), of Millbank, Westminster, and Rainham, Essex, was a British Whig politician who sat in the House of Commons between 1727 and 1754.

== Biography ==
Crosse was the second and younger of the two sons of Sir Thomas Crosse, 1st Baronet and his wife Jane Lambe, daughter of Patrick Lambe, of Stoke Poges, Buckinghamshire. He entered Westminster School on 10 January 1715, aged 14 and matriculated at Christ Church, Oxford, on 21 February 1717, aged 16.

Crosse was returned as Member of Parliament for Wootton Basset as an administration candidate at the 1727 British general election. He voted for the Government in all recorded divisions. At the 1734 British general election, he stood for Great Marlow, and was defeated. He was returned unopposed for Lostwithiel at a by-election on 19 May 1735. He succeeded his father to the baronetcy on 27 May 1738, his elder brother, Thomas, having died before him. He was returned again for Lostwithiel at the 1741 British general election, when he also used his influence to support the government candidates at Westminster, rescuing one of them, Lord Sundon, from the mob in his coach. After the fall of Walpole in 1742, he was absent from the division on the Hanoverian troops in December 1742, and voted against them in December 1743 and January 1744. He returned to supporting the Administration, and voted for the Hanoverians in 1746 when he was classed as Old Whig. He did not stand at the 1747 British general election.

Crosse had been active in local affairs at Westminster since 1727, and the constituency had been represented by his father. Henry Pelham asked him to stand for Westminster at the 1754 British general election to which he agreed on condition he put up no more than £500 to the costs. He was returned as MP for Westminster, but there is no record of any speeches or votes by him. He declined to stand at the 1761 British general election on grounds of ill health.

Crosse married Mary Godfrey on 15 July 1746 at St John's, Westminster. They had no children and on his death at Millbank on 12 March 1762 the baronetcy became extinct. He was buried on 2 April 1762, at St Margaret's, Westminster. His widow was buried in the same church on 25 September 1770.

Parliament of Great Britain
Preceded by Colonel Robert Murray; William Chetwynd	Member of Parliament for Wootton Basset; 1727–1734; With: John St John	Succeeded by Sir Robert Long; Captain Nicholas Robinson
Preceded by Richard Edgcumbe; Matthew Ducie Moreton	Member of Parliament for Lostwithiel; 1735–1747; With: Richard Edgcumbe 1735-1741; Sir Robert Salusbury Cotton 1741-1747	Succeeded by Richard Edgcumbe; James Edward Colleton
Preceded by Granville Leveson-Gower; Edward Cornwallis	Member of Parliament for Westminster; 1754–1761; With: Edward Cornwallis	Succeeded by William Pulteney; Edward Cornwallis
Baronetage of Great Britain
Preceded by Thomas Crosse	Baronet (of Westminster); 1738–1762	Extinct
