= Sir Thomas Crosse, 1st Baronet =

English brewer and Tory politician

Sir Thomas Crosse, 1st Baronet (29 November 1663 – 27 May 1738) was an English brewer and Tory politician who sat in the English House of Commons and British House of Commons between 1701 and 1722.

Crosse was the eldest son of Thomas Crosse (died 1682), brewer of St Margaret's, Westminster, and his wife Mary Lockwood. He was educated at Westminster School underRichard Busby. In about 1688, he married Jane Lambe, daughter of Patrick Lambe, of Stoke Poges, Buckinghamshire.

Crosse was elected Member of Parliament for Westminster at the January 1701 general election, but lost the seat in the December 1701 election. He was elected MP for Westminster again in the 1702 general election and was defeated in 1705. He regained his seat at the 1710 general election and was returned unopposed in 1713. He was created a baronet on 11 or 13 July 1713.

Crosse was returned unopposed again for Westminster at the 1715 general election. In 1721 he was made a director of the South Sea Company. He was defeated at the 1722 general election and although the election was declared void, did not stand again.

Crosse died aged 74 on 27 May 1738. He had two sons of whom the eldest, Thomas, died before him in August 1732. He was succeeded by his younger son, John. He was buried at St Margaret's, Westminster, on 1 June 1738.

Parliament of England
Preceded by James Vernon; Charles Montagu	Member of Parliament for Westminster; 1701–1701; With: James Vernon	Succeeded by James Vernon; Sir Henry Colt
Preceded by James Vernon; Sir Henry Colt	Member of Parliament for Westminster; 1702–1705; With: Sir Walter Clarges, Bt	Succeeded by Henry Boyle; Sir Henry Colt
Parliament of Great Britain
Preceded by Henry Boyle; Thomas Medlycott	Member of Parliament for Westminster; 1710–1722; With: Thomas Medlycott; Edward Wortley Montagu	Succeeded by John Cotton; Archibald Hutcheson
Baronetage of Great Britain
New title	Baronet (of Westminster); 1713–1738	Succeeded by John Crosse
