= Robert Sibthorp =

Anglican bishop

Robert Sibthorp(e) was an Anglican bishop in Ireland during the first half of the seventeenth century.

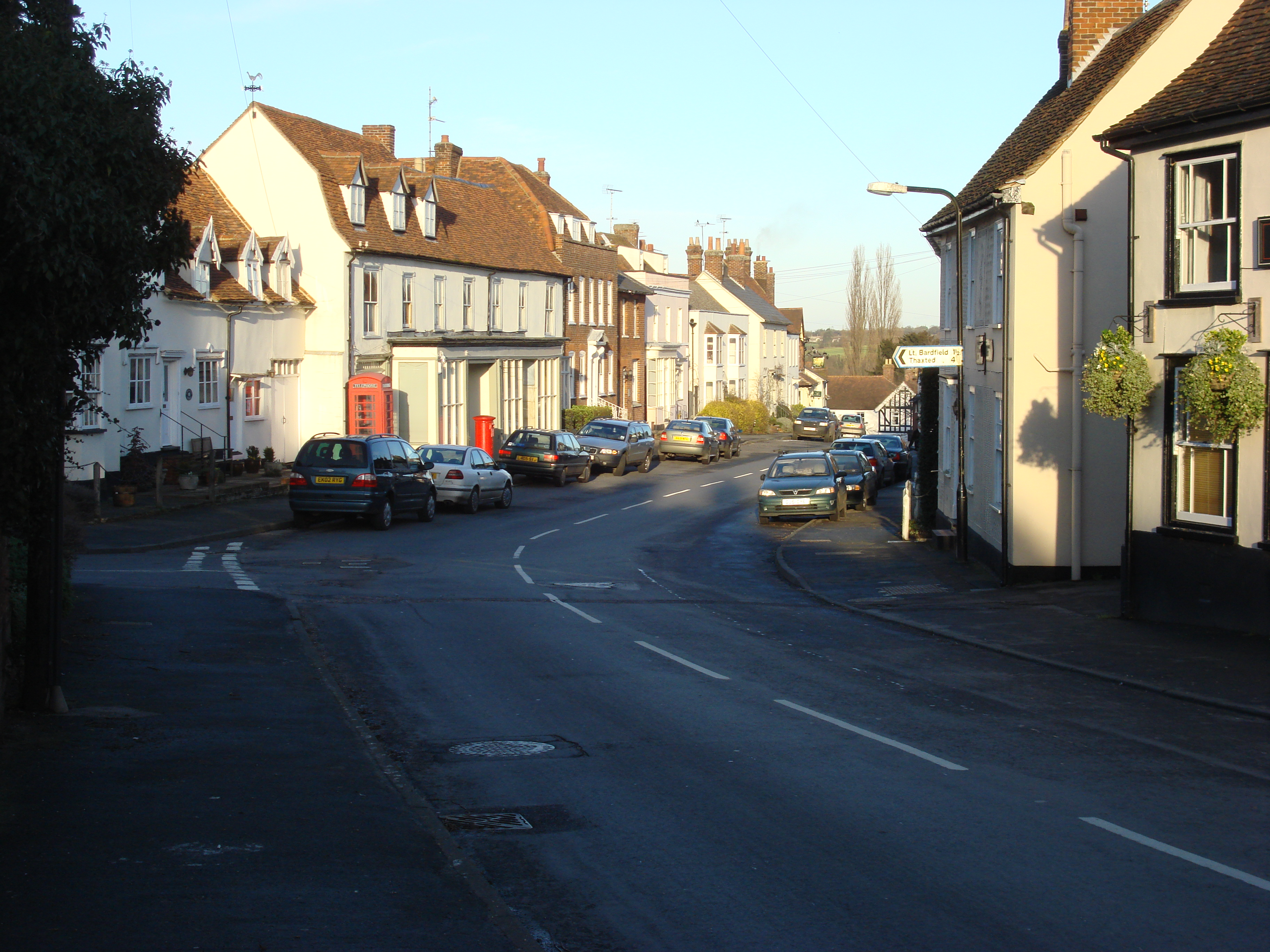
Great Bardfield, Essex, the Bishop's birthplace

He was born at Great Bardfield, Essex, one of the three sons of John Sibthorpe. His mother may have been called Jane Berners, but this is uncertain. Sir Christopher Sibthorpe (died 1632), justice of the Court of King's Bench (Ireland), was one of his brothers. Robert graduated from Lincoln College, Oxford.

Christopher, as well as being a judge, was a noted religious polemicist. Both brothers were friends of James Ussher, appointed Archbishop of Armagh in 1625, who encouraged Christopher to write more. This friendship no doubt fostered the career of Robert, who presumably shared his brother's Puritan and Anti-Catholic beliefs, (as did Ussher). Thomas Wentworth, 1st Earl of Strafford, Lord Lieutenant of Ireland, also praised Robert as an "honest and able man", and he has the respect of his fellow Bishops, who in 1640 recommended him for the vacant See of Ossory.

Formerly Treasurer of Killaloe and Prebendary of Maynooth in St Patrick's Cathedral, Dublin, he was nominated Bishop of Kilfenora on 19 June 1638 and consecrated on 11 November that year. In 1643 he was translated to Limerick, where he found that the Diocese had been so utterly wasted by the ravages of the Civil War that he was unable to derive any revenue from his bishopric. He died in April 1649 and was buried in St. Werburgh's Church, Dublin.

Neither he nor Christopher had any children, and their property passed to the children of their brother William Sibthorpe of Dunany, of whom we know most of their niece, Lucy. Lucy married Henry Bellingham of Gernonstown, County Louth, ancestor of the Bellingham Baronets of Castlebellingham. John Sibthorpe, a barrister of the King's Inns in the 1620s, was no doubt another family member.

== Notes ==
Church of Ireland titles
Preceded by James Heygate; Bishop of Limerick (in commendam)	Bishop of Kilfenora; 1638–1643	Succeeded by See vacant
Preceded by George Webb	Bishop of Limerick; 1643–1649	Succeeded by See vacant
