= Sir Thomas Clarges, 4th Baronet =

Sir Thomas Clarges (c. 1780 – 17 February 1834) was the son of Sir Thomas Clarges, 3rd Baronet and Louisa Skrine. He was a pupil at Eton College, matriculated at Christ Church, Oxford in 1799, and graduated from Oxford University in 1802. He succeeded as the 4th Baronet Clarges, of St. Martin's in the Fields in the County of Middlesex, on 23 December 1782. From 1803 until his death, he was Constable of Durham Castle in the County Palatine. In addition to his landed estates (including Bitchfield and Norton Disney in Lincolnshire, and Sutton-on-Derwent, near York), he also owned a half-share in the Theatre Royal, Brighton, which he had purchased in 1807. He died on 17 February 1834 at Brighton, unmarried. On his death, his baronetcy became extinct. His will was proven (by probate) in March 1834.

== Bibliography ==
- "Clarges." 1844. In: A Genealogical and Heraldic History of the Extinct and Dormant Baronetcies in England, Ireland and Scotland, compiled by J. Burke and J.B. Burke, 2nd edition: 116–117. London, UK: John Russell Smith.
- "Clarges." 1904. In: Complete Baronetage, edited by G.E. Cokayne, volume 4, 1665-1707: 65–66. Exeter, UK: William Pollard. 5 volumes.
- Dale, A. 1980.The Theatre Royal, Brighton. Stocksfield, UK: Oriel Press.
- Patent of Appointment of Sir Thomas Clarges, Bart, as Constable of Durham Castle and confirmation by Dean and Chapter, 31st March 1803. Durham University Library, Archives and Special Collections: CCB B/172/67 (57232).

Baronetage of England
Preceded by Thomas Clarges	Baronet (of St Martin's in the Fields); 1782–1834	Extinct

p
