= Christopher Sibthorpe =

English-Irish lawyer (died 1632)

Sir Christopher Sibthorpe (died 1632) was an English-born lawyer who had a distinguished career in Ireland as a judge and politician, and was also a religious writer of some note.

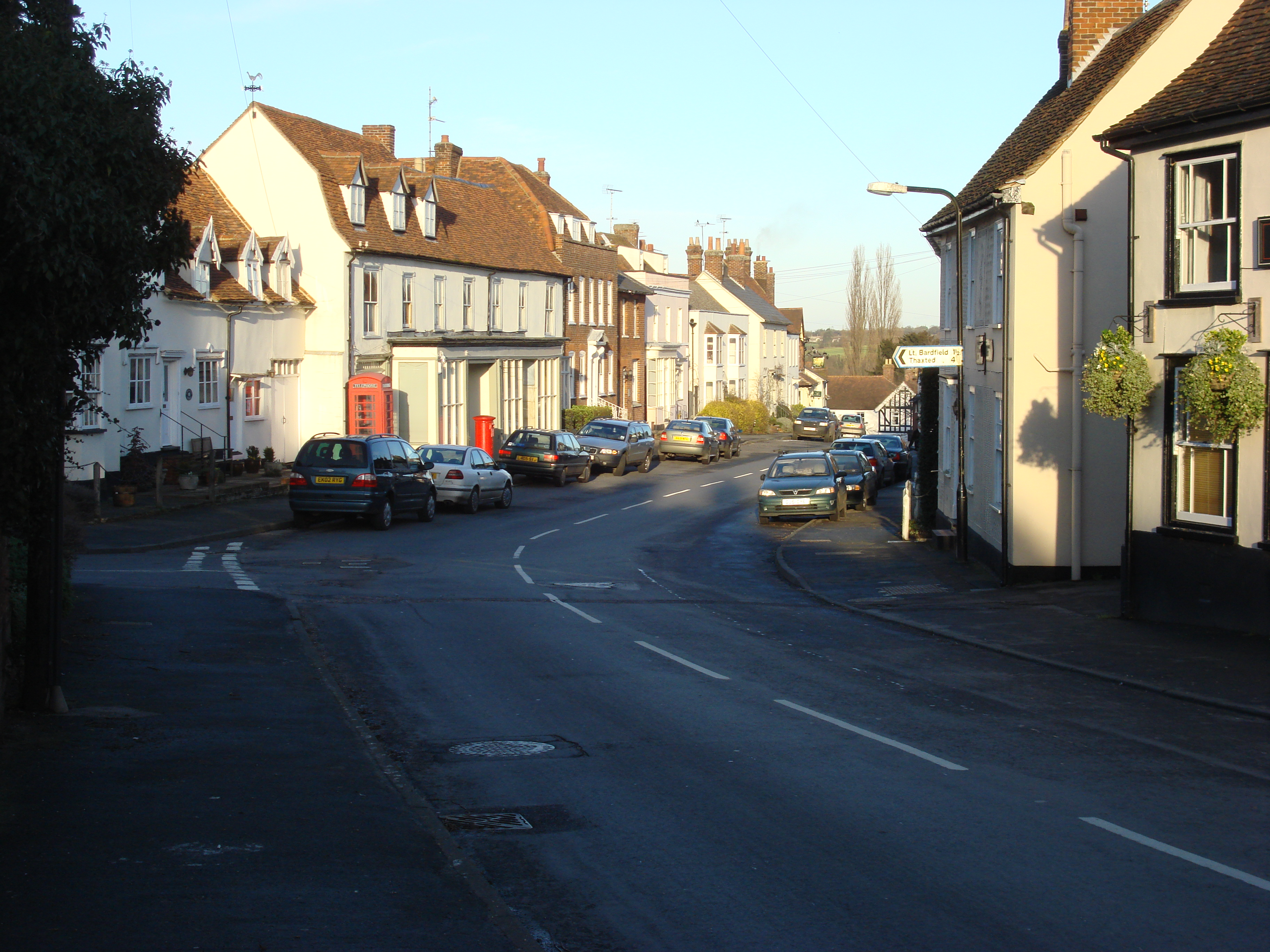
Great Bardfield, Essex, where the Sibthorpe brothers were born

== Early life ==
He was born in Great Bardfield, Essex, third son of John Sibthorpe. His mother had been tentatively identified as Jane Berners of Finchingfield, Essex. Robert Sibthorp, Bishop of Limerick from 1642 until his death in 1649, was his brother. Another brother, William, also moved to Ireland and settled at Dunany, County Louth. There were still Sibthorpes at Dunany in the late eighteenth century.

Christopher matriculated from the University of Cambridge and entered the Middle Temple in 1584, but was expelled in 1588 for "unorthodox" i.e. Puritan, beliefs. He never wavered in these beliefs, which brought him both fame and controversy as a writer.

== Barrister ==
He was called to the Bar in 1594. How good a lawyer he was is debatable. Hostile critics said that his move to Ireland was due to the fact that could not make his living in Westminster Hall, and that his opposition to the admission of Roman Catholics to the Irish Bar was not due to his religious convictions, but a desire to remove competitors for business. This was probably an unfair judgement, as his move to Ireland was apparently not his own choice, but was due to the Crown's desire to make use of his services, which they valued highly.

== A judge in Ireland ==
He was appointed third justice of the Court of King's Bench (Ireland) in 1607. Shortly afterwards he was one of the judges sent to Ulster to indict Hugh O'Neill, 2nd Earl of Tyrone and Rory O'Donnell, 1st Earl of Tyrconnell, for rebellion, although the indictment was rendered academic by the Flight of the Earls. He was sent to Ulster as a judge of assize almost every year and acquired a great knowledge of the political workings of the province. As a result of the burden of extra work, and the long journeys, he asked for a raise in salary.

He was frequently asked to arbitrate in disputes between settlers and the original inhabitants of the province during the Plantation of Ulster. He was one of the Undertakers who was granted lands during the settlement of County Fermanagh in 1612.

== Writer ==
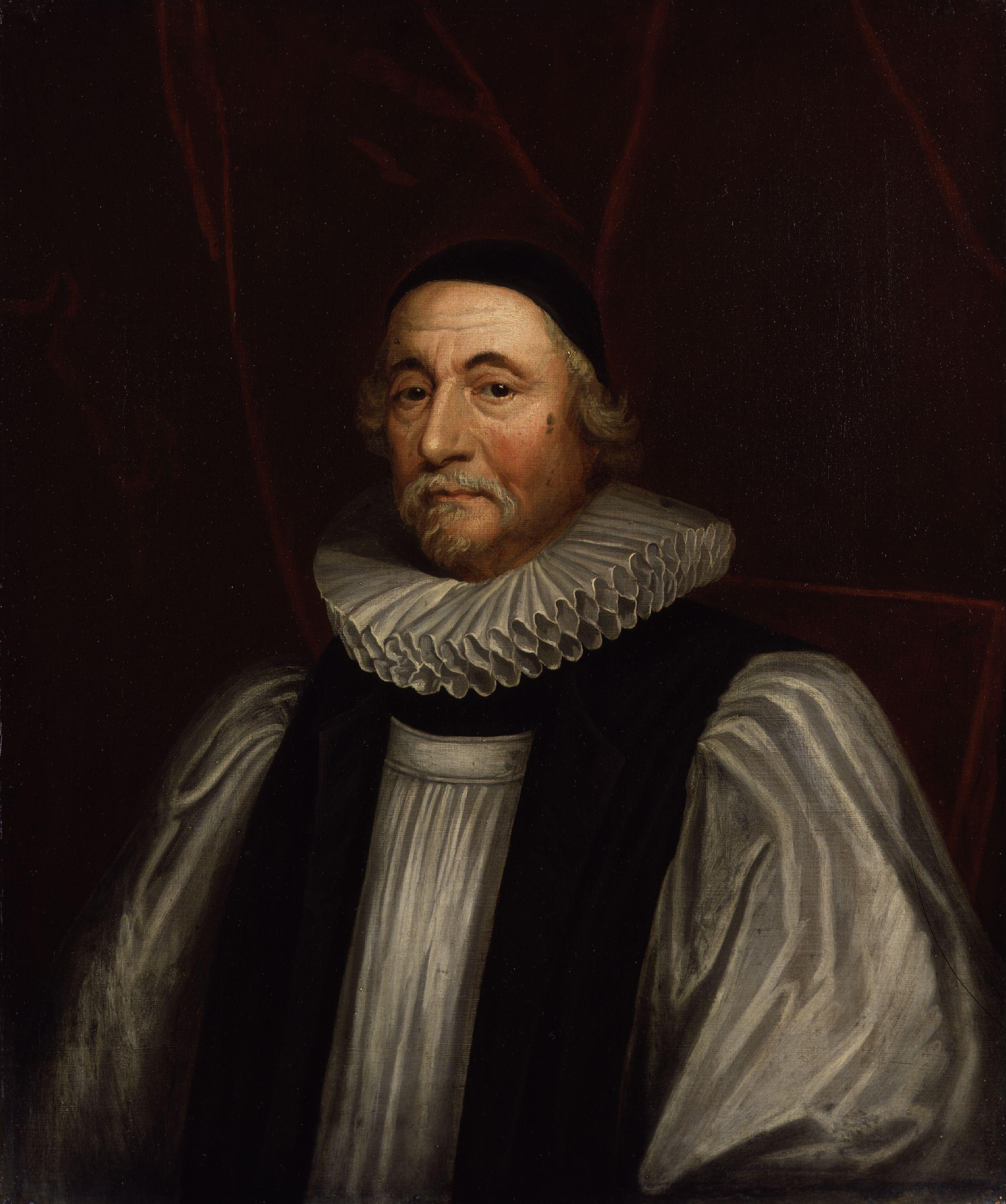
James Ussher, Archbishop of Armagh, Sibthorpe's friend and patron

He was described as "an honest man" and "very well-liked". Although he had not been on the best of terms with the Church of England hierarchy, he was a friend of James Ussher, appointed Bishop of Meath in 1621 and Archbishop of Armagh in 1625, who shared his Puritan leanings, and praised his anti-Catholic tract A Friendly Advertisement to the pretended Catholickes of Ireland, which was written about 1612 and published in 1622.

Ussher encouraged him to publish more works of religious controversy. Though admired, at least by the Puritan faction of the Church, in his own time, his writings have recently been described as crude anti-Catholic polemics, consisting largely of standard insults such as describing the Pope as the Antichrist.

== Member of Parliament ==
His services were so highly regarded by the Crown that when the only Irish Parliament in the reign of King James I of England was called in 1613, Sibthorpe was elected as a Government nominee to the Irish House of Commons as MP for Limavady. While grossly improper by modern standards, the election of judges to the Irish Parliament was not unusual at this time (there were three High Court judges in the Parliament of 1613–15).

Sibthorpe, an eloquent speaker, played a leading role in the debates. He witnessed the undignified scene which followed the failure of the Catholic Sir John Everard to secure his election as Speaker (Everard refused to leave the chair until his rival for the Speakership literally sat on him), and their relations were never good. Sibthorpe was knighted in 1618.

He joined the King's Inns in 1608 and served as Treasurer in 1629. His attitude to Catholic barristers like Everard (whose admission to the Inns he opposed) remained uncompromising, especially where they managed to evade taking the Oath of Supremacy, "which they so greatly dislike and refuse" as he noted, and he continued to oppose the admission of Catholics to the Irish Bar.

== Family ==
He died in 1632. He was married, but little is known of his wife. They had no children. His property passed to his brother Robert and then to the children of their brother, William Sibthorpe of Dunany. Of these, we know most of Lucy, who married Henry Bellingham of Gernonstown, County Louth, ancestor of the Bellingham Baronets of Castle Bellingham. The John Sibthorpe who is listed as a member of the King's Inns in 1622 was no doubt a relative of Christopher and Robert, possibly a brother of Lucy.

== Sources ==
- Ball, F. Elrington The Judges in Ireland 1221–1921 London John Murray 1926
- Clavin, Terry "Sibthorpe, Sir Christopher" Cambridge Dictionary of Irish Biography 2009
- Foster, Joseph Baronetage and Knightage of Ireland Westminster Nichols and Sons 1881
- Kenny, Colum King's Inns and the Kingdom of Ireland Dublin Irish Academic Press 1992
