= James Vernon (politician, born 1646) =

English politician (c. 1646 – c. 1727)

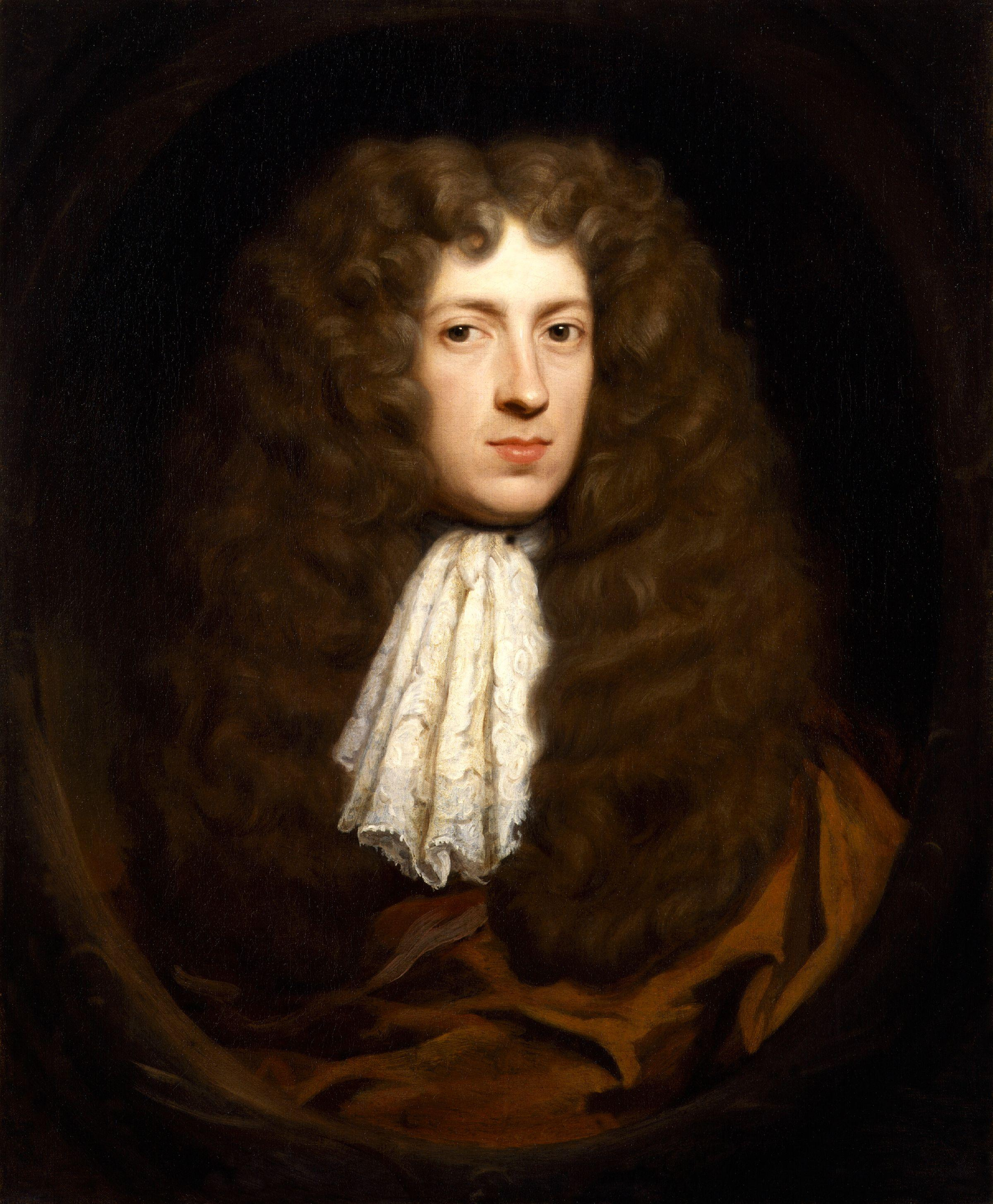
A portrait of Vernon

James Vernon (c. 1646 – c. 1727) was an English Whig politician who sat in the English and British House of Commons between 1679 and 1710. He was Secretary of State for both the Northern and the Southern Departments during the reign of William III.

== Early life ==
Vernon was a younger son of Francis Vernon of London (a scion of the Vernons of Haslington, Cheshire, and Hanbury, Worcestershire), and his wife, Anne Welby, widow, daughter of George Smithes, a London goldsmith. Like his elder brother Francis, he was educated at Charterhouse School, and matriculated at Christ Church, Oxford on 19 July 1662, aged 16. He graduated BA in 1666, and proceeded MA in 1669 (incorporated MA at Cambridge in 1676).

He married, by licence dated 6 April 1675, Mary Buck, daughter of Sir John Buck, 1st Baronet, of Hamby Grange, Lincolnshire.

== Rise to prominence ==
Vernon was employed by Sir Joseph Williamson to collect news in Holland in March 1672, and in the following June attended Lord Halifax on his mission to Louis XIV. On his return he became secretary to the Duke of Monmouth. He is said to have removed the words 'natural son' from the patent conferring the command-in-chief upon the duke in 1674 but left his service in 1678. Having been admitted to St John's College, Cambridge the previous month, he was returned at the general election of March 1679 as Member of Parliament for Cambridge University. He then entered the secretary of state's office as clerk and gazetteer, i.e. editor of the London Gazette. These duties he exchanged on the revolution for the post of private secretary to Lord Shrewsbury. On Shrewsbury's resignation, Vernon served in the same capacity Sir John Trenchard, by whom he was employed in Flanders in the summer of 1692 to furnish reports of the movements of the army to Sir William Dutton Colt, British minister at Celle. In 1693 he was appointed to a commissionership of prizes, which he held until 1705.

At the 1695 English general election, Vernon was returned to parliament as MP for Penryn, Cornwall. On Shrewsbury's return to power (March 1693–4) Vernon resumed in name his former relations with him. Shrewsbury's ill-health, however, and the course of events soon thrust Vernon into prominence, and during the king's absences on the continent he acted as secretary to the lords justices. On him fell the main burden of investigating the assassination plot, and of hushing up the charges brought by Sir John Fenwick (1645–1697) against Godolphin, Shrewsbury, Marlborough, and Russell. In support of the bill for Fenwick's attainder he made on 25 November 1696 the only important speech which he is recorded to have delivered throughout his parliamentary career. The dexterity which he displayed in this affair, and Shrewsbury's virtual retirement, enhanced his consequence, and at Sunderland's suggestion he received the seals on the resignation of Sir William Trumbull, and was sworn of the privy council (5 December 1697). Though he did not formally succeed to Shrewsbury's department on his resignation, 12 December 1698, he was thenceforth virtually secretary for both departments until the delivery of the southern seals to the Earl of Jersey, 14 May 1699. At the 1698 English general election, he was returned as MP for Westminster.

== Secretary of State ==
By the king Vernon was treated rather as a clerk than as a minister. He was hardly more than cognisant of the negotiations for the peace of Ryswick, and of the partition treaty he knew nothing until the draft was placed in his hands for transmission to Lord Somers. He went down to Tunbridge Wells with a mind made up against the treaty, and, though he drafted the blank commission and transmitted it to Holland, he fully approved, if he did not inspire, the letter with which Somers accompanied it (28 August 1698). When the treaty was signed he drafted the necessary forms of ratification and procured their authentication by Somers under the great seal. With Somers alone of the ministers in England, he shared the secret of the separate articles. When the treaty came before the notice of parliament, Portland, who bore the first brunt of the attack, sought to share his responsibility with Vernon, whom he represented as cognisant of and concurring in the negotiation from the outset. Vernon cleared himself from this charge by producing with the king's leave the relevant correspondence, and, though no less responsible than Somers for the course taken at Tunbridge Wells, he was omitted from the articles of impeachment and was continued in office. He was, in fact, sole secretary during the interval, 2 May – 5 November 1700, between Jersey's resignation and the appointment of Sir Charles Hedges, and retained the seals when Hedges gave place to the Duke of Manchester on 1 January 1701–2.

== Dismissal and later career ==
A staunch Whig, Vernon viewed with undisguised alarm the death of the Duke of Gloucester on 30 July 1700, and proposed that the king should again marry and the succession be settled, in default of issue, in the Hanoverian line, thus passing over Anne. This proposition rendered him so odious to the Tories that, soon after the accession of Anne, he was dismissed and replaced by the Earl of Nottingham. He was re-elected MP for Westminster in the two general elections of 1701. He did not stand at the 1702 English general election. By way of pension, he was provided on 29 June 1702, with the sinecure office of Teller of the Receipt of the Exchequer. He was again returned as MP for Penryn at the 1705 English general election and then at the 1708 British general election. He lost his tellership in September 1710 on the decisive victory of the Tories, but was subsequently rewarded with a bounty of £700 and an annual pension of £600. He did not stand at the 1710 British general election. He was one of the commissioners to whom, on 28 August 1716, the Privy Seal was entrusted during Sunderland's absence on the continent, but held no other office during the reign of George I.

== Later life and legacy ==
Vernon's wife Mary died on 12 October 1715. His last days were spent in retirement at Watford, Hertfordshire, where he died on 31 January 1727. His remains were interred in Watford parish church. He, and his wife Mary, had two sons and two daughters, one of whom Mary married Michael Harrison, M.P. for Lisburn, Co. Antrim. His eldest son, James (died 1756), was ambassador to Copenhagen. His younger son, Edward Vernon (1684–1757), became an admiral, who was famous for his victory at Porto Bello, and was the eponym of George Washington's estate Mount Vernon. Vernon's grandson, son of his eldest son James and Arethusa Boyle, Francis, was created Earl of Shipbrook in 1777.

== See also ==
- William Chaloner

Parliament of England
| Preceded by Sir Richard Fanshawe; Sir Charles Wheler | Member of Parliament for Cambridge University; 1679–1681; With: Sir Thomas Exton | Succeeded by Robert Brady; Sir Thomas Exton |
| Preceded by Sidney Godolphin; Alexander Pendarves | Member of Parliament for Penryn; 1695–1699; With: Alexander Pendarves 1695–1698; Samuel Trefusis 1698–1699 | Succeeded by Samuel Trefusis; Alexander Pendarves |
| Preceded by Sir Stephen Fox; Charles Montagu | Member of Parliament for Westminster; 1698–1702; With: Charles Montagu 1698–1701; Sir Thomas Crosse 1701; Sir Henry Colt 1701–1702 | Succeeded by Sir Walter Clarges, Bt; Sir Thomas Crosse |
| Preceded by Samuel Trefusis; Alexander Pendarves | MP for Penryn; 1705–1707; With: Samuel Trefusis | Succeeded by Parliament of Great Britain |
Parliament of Great Britain
| Preceded by Parliament of England | MP for Penryn; 1707–1710; With: Samuel Trefusis | Succeeded by Samuel Trefusis; Alexander Pendarves |
Political offices
| Preceded by William Trumbull | Secretary of State for the Northern Department; 1697–1700 | Succeeded by Charles Hedges |
| Preceded by The Duke of Shrewsbury | Secretary of State for the Southern Department; 1698–1699 | Succeeded by The Earl of Jersey |
| Preceded by The Earl of Jersey | Secretary of State for the Southern Department; 1700–1702 | Succeeded by The Earl of Manchester |
| Preceded by Charles Hedges | Secretary of State for the Northern Department; 1702 | Succeeded by Charles Hedges |
| Preceded by Sir John Stanley | Teller of the Receipt of the Exchequer; 1702–1706 | Succeeded by John Smith |
