= Crosse baronets =

Extinct baronetcy of Great Britain

Escutcheon of the Crosse baronets of Westminster

The Crosse baronetcy, of Westminster, was a title in the Baronetage of Great Britain. It was created on 11 or 13 July 1713, for Thomas Crosse, Member of Parliament for Westminster.

The 2nd Baronet represented Wootton Bassett, Lostwithiel and Westminster in Parliament. The title became extinct on his death in 1762.

== Crosse baronets, of Westminster (1713) ==
- Sir Thomas Crosse, 1st Baronet (1664–1738)
- Sir John Crosse, 2nd Baronet (c. 1700–1762)

Baronetage of Great Britain
| Preceded by Freke baronets | Crosse baronets of Westminster; 11 or 13 July 1713 | Succeeded by Evelyn baronets |
