= Newtown Limavady (Parliament of Ireland constituency) =

Pre-1801 Irish constituency

- Former borough constituency for the Irish House of Commons
- County: County Londonderry
- Borough: Limavady

–1801
- Replaced by: Disfranchised

Newtown Limavady was a constituency represented in the Irish House of Commons until 1800.

== Members of Parliament ==
- 1613-1615 Sir Christopher Sibthorpe and Roger Downton
- 1634–1635 Arthur Newcome and George Downing
- 1639–1649 Dudley Philips and John Usher
- 1661–1666 George Philips and Sir Richard Gethin, 1st Baronet

=== 1692–1801 ===
Election	First MP		Second MP
1692	Hugh Rowley		Sir John Topham
1695	William Porter		Richard Stone
1703	William Conolly	Whig	William Cairnes
September 1703	George Macartney		Thomas Carr
1713	William Conolly	Whig	Hugh Henry
1714	Benjamin Parry		William Ussher
1715	Isaac Manley		Joseph Henry
1717	Isaac Manley		Thomas Marlay
1727	Isaac Manley		Thomas Medlycott
1736	Alexander Nesbitt		Thomas Medlycott
1739	Alexander Nesbitt		Edward Riggs
1742	Alexander Nesbitt		Edmond Leslie-Corry
1761	William Burton		Edmond Leslie-Corry
November 1765	William Burton		Arthur Magan
1765	William Burton		John Staples
1768	William Burton		Richard Jones
1776	William Burton		Alexander Murray
1777	William Colvill		Alexander Murray
1783	John Staples		John Richardson
1795	John Staples		Hugh Carncross
1796	Richard Trench		Hugh Carncross
January 1798	Viscount Castlereagh		Hugh Carncross
1798	John Maxwell		Hugh Carncross
1798	John Maxwell		Eyre Power Trench
1799	John Maxwell		Charles Trench
1801	Constituency disenfranchised		
