= Stanley Gethin =

English cricketer

Cricket information
- Batting: Right-handed
- Bowling: Right arm medium

Career statistics
Competition	First-class
Matches	4
Runs scored	86
Batting average	12.28
100s/50s	0/0
Top score	41
Balls bowled	78
Wickets	1
Bowling average	49.00
5 wickets in innings	0
10 wickets in match	0
Best bowling	1/25
Catches/stumpings	0/–
- Source: Cricinfo, 7 November 2022

Stanley John Gethin (16 February 1875 – 17 February 1950) was an English first-class cricketer who played in four matches for Worcestershire. His highest score of 41 was against London County, while his only first-class wicket, that of future Test player Len Braund, came in the same match.

Gethin was born in Kidderminster, Worcestershire and also died there one day after his 75th birthday.

Gethin's younger brother William played one match for Worcestershire in 1921.
