= Noel Broxholme =

English physician

Noel Broxholme, M.D. (1686–1748), was an English physician.

== Early life ==
Broxholme was, according to William Stukeley, a native of Stamford, Lincolnshire, of humble origin, the son of Robert Broxholme of Oakham, Rutland. He was admitted on the foundation at Westminster School in 1700, and, in 1704, was elected to Trinity College, Cambridge. He proceeded, however, to Christ Church, Oxford, where he was nominated student 23 July 1705, and graduated B.A. on 20 May 1709 and M.A. on 18 April 1711.

In 1709, he had commenced his medical studies, under Richard Mead, at St. Thomas's Hospital, and, in 1715, was elected to one of the first of the Radcliffe travelling fellowships. Upon his return, he removed to University College, Oxford, as a member of which he took his degrees in physic by accumulation, proceeding M.D. 8 July 1723.

== Medical career ==
Broxholme then began practice in London. He was admitted a Candidate of the College of Physicians on 23 December 1723, a Fellow on 22 March 1724–5, and served as Censor for 1726. He delivered the Harveian Oration in 1731: it was printed the same year in quarto, and is remarkable for its elegant yet unaffected Latinity.

He was one of the six physicians appointed to St. George's Hospital, Lanesborough House, at the first general board held 19 Oct. 1733, and in the following year was made first physician to the Prince of Wales, 'with salary annexed,' an office which he resigned in 1739. At Lord Hervey's suggestion he was the first physician summoned to assist Dr. George Lewis Teissier in Queen Caroline's last illness.

== Personal life ==
On 7 May 1730 at Trinity Chapel, Knightsbridge, he married Amy Hammond, widow of the politician William Dowdeswell, of Pull Court at Bushley in Worcestershire, and daughter of the poet Anthony Hammond. Her sons William Dowdeswell (1721-1775) and George Dowdeswell became significant beneficiaries in Broxholme's will.

Dr. Stukeley, his countryman and fellow-student at St. Thomas's Hospital, reported that Broxholme "was a man of wit and gayety, lov'd poetry, was a good classic, … got much money in the Misisipi project in France. At length he came over and practised, but never had a great liking to it, tho' he had good encouragem[en]t." "He was always nervous and vapoured," wrote Horace Walpole, "and so good-natured that he left off his practice from not being able to bear seeing so many melancholy objects. I remember him with as much wit as ever I knew." In 1755 Robert Taylor (1710-1762), royal physician, speaking of his exceptional intellectual and personal qualities, described Broxholme as an ornament to the Radcliffe award.

== Legacy ==
He died in his country home at Hampton, Middlesex, by his own hand, on 8 July 1748 and was buried on the 13th at Hampton. In his will he bequeathed £500 for the benefit of the king's scholars at Westminster 'in such manner as the two upper masters of the said school shall think fit,' and a similar amount to Christ Church 'to be applied towards finishing the library.' His widow survived him by six years, dying in 1754.

In 1754 there appeared A Collection of Receipts in Physic, purporting to be Dr Broxholme's remedies.
