= Jean-Baptiste de Poussin =

French diplomat

Jean-Baptiste de Poussin (died 1749) was a French diplomat and a Knight of Order of Saints Maurice and Lazarus.

De Poussin was sent by the French Crown as a secret envoy to London, before postings to Copenhagen (from 1702) and Hamburg (from 1714).
