= Michael Gething =

Australian judge (born 1967)

Michael John Gething (born 12 August 1967) is an Australian judge of the District Court of Western Australia since 12 February 2016. In 2014, Gething served as the Principal Registrar and Acting Master of the Supreme Court of Western Australia. Prior to this he served as the Principal Registrar of the District Court of Western Australia.

== Early life ==
Gething read law at the University of Western Australia. He gained admittance to practice law in 1991.
