= Gethin Robinson =

- Born: 5 October 1982 (age 44) Cardiff, Wales
- Height: 183 cm (6 ft 0 in)
- Weight: 113 kg (17 st 11 lb)

Rugby union career
- Current team: Newport Gwent Dragons
Senior career
| Years | Team | Apps | (Points) |
| 2003–12 | Newport GD | 47 | (0) |

Gethin Robinson (born 5 October 1982, Cardiff) is a Welsh rugby union player. A prop forward, he played his club rugby for Newport Gwent Dragons. He was released by Newport Gwent Dragons at the end of the 2011–12 season and joined Newport RFC
