= Edward Finch (composer) =

English composer

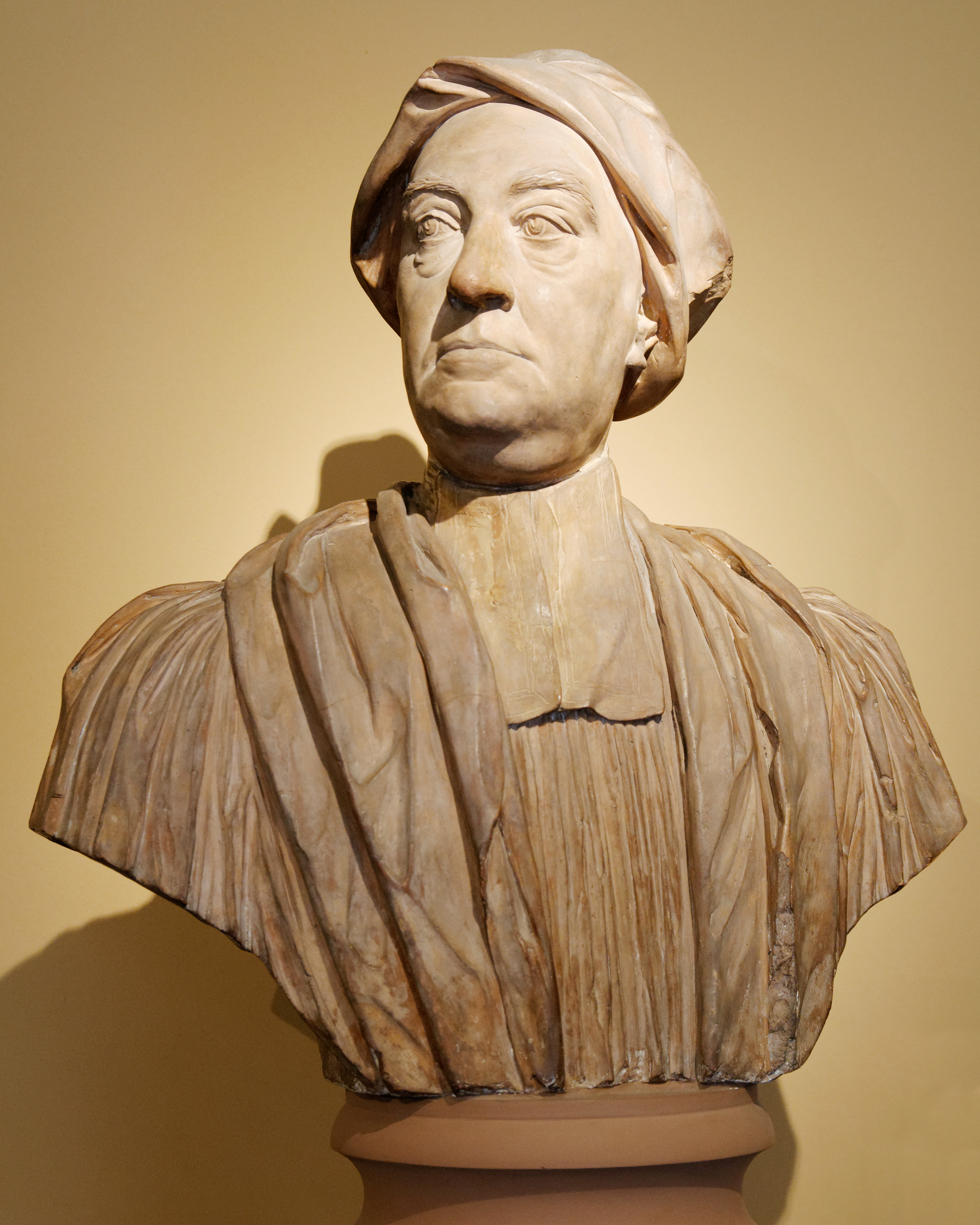
Edward Finch, bust by John Michael Rysbrack

Edward Finch (1664–1738) was an English composer.

== Life ==
He was the fifth son of Heneage Finch, 1st Earl of Nottingham, and was educated at Christ's College, Cambridge, proceeding M.A. in 1679, and becoming a fellow of Christ's. He represented the University of Cambridge in the parliament of 1689–90. He was ordained deacon at York in 1700, became rector of Wigan, was appointed prebendary of York 26 April 1704, and resided in the north end of the treasurer's house in the Close, taking an active interest in musical matters, as appears from the family correspondence. Finch was installed prebendary of Canterbury 8 Feb. 1710. He died 14 February 1738, aged 75, at York, where a monument erected by him in the minster to his wife and brother (Henry, dean of York) bore a bust and inscription to his memory.

== Works ==
Finch's "Te Deum" and anthem "Grant, we beseech Thee", both written in five parts, were included in Thomas Tudway's Collection of Services (Harleian MSS. 7337–42); "A Grammar of Thorough Bass", with examples, a manuscript of 66 pages, went to the Euing Library at Glasgow. In Finch's manuscript letters is one addressed to his brother Daniel Finch, 2nd Earl of Nottingham, and dated Winwick, 12 July 1702; he there enunciated his views on sinecures and discusses other questions of preferment.
