= Sir Henry Colt, 1st Baronet =

English politician

Sir Henry Dutton Colt, 1st Baronet (c. 1646–1731), of St. James's, Westminster, was an English politician.

He was a member of Parliament for Newport, Isle of Wight in the period 2 December 1695 – 1698 and for Westminster in December 1701 – 1702 and 1705–1708. He was the first of the Colt baronets.

Parliament of England
Preceded by Sir Robert Cotton; The Lord Cutts	Member of Parliament for Newport, Isle of Wight; 1695 – 1698; With: Sir Robert Cotton	Succeeded by Sir Robert Cotton; The Lord Cutts
Preceded by James Vernon; Sir Thomas Crosse	Member of Parliament for Westminster; 1701 – 1702; With: James Vernon	Succeeded by Sir Walter Clarges, Bt; Sir Thomas Crosse
Preceded by Sir Walter Clarges, Bt; Sir Thomas Crosse	Member of Parliament for Westminster; 1705 – 1707; With: Henry Boyle	Succeeded by Parliament of Great Britain
Parliament of Great Britain
Preceded by Parliament of England	Member of Parliament for Westminster; 1707 – 1708; With: Henry Boyle	Succeeded by Henry Boyle; Thomas Medlycott
Baronetage of England
New title	Baronet (of St James's-in-the-Fields); 1694 – 1731	Succeeded by John Dutton Colt
