= Gethin baronets =

Baronetcy in the Baronetage of Ireland

The Gethin Baronetcy, of Gethinsgrott in Cork, is a title in the Baronetage of Ireland. It was created on 1 August 1665 for Richard Gethin, who represented Clonmel and Newtown Limavady in the Irish House of Commons. The eighth Baronet was a Colonel in the British Army. Later generations added the name St. Lawrence, to indicate their connection to the Earl of Howth.

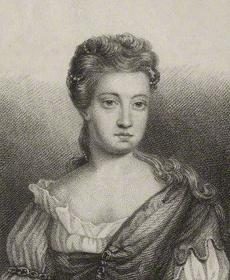
Grace, Lady Gethin, first wife of the second Baronet and a noted essayist

Grace Norton, Lady Gethin, the first wife of the second Baronet, was an essayist and woman of learning. She died when she was only 21.

== Gethin baronets, of Gethinsgrott (1665) ==
- Sir Richard Gethin, 1st Baronet (c. 1615 – c. 1685)
- Sir Richard Gethin, 2nd Baronet (1674–1709), married firstly Grace Norton and secondly Sarah Farnham
- Sir Richard Gethin, 3rd Baronet (1698–c. 1765)
- Sir Richard Gethin, 4th Baronet (c. 1725–c. 1778), married Mary St. Lawrence, daughter of William St Lawrence, 12th Baron Howth
- Sir Percy Gethin, 5th Baronet (died 1837)
- Sir Richard Gethin, 6th Baronet (1823–1885)
- Sir Richard Charles Percy Gethin, 7th Baronet (1847–1921)
- Sir Richard Walter St Lawrence Gethin, 8th Baronet (1878–1946)
- Sir Richard Patrick St Lawrence Gethin, 9th Baronet (1911–1988)
- Sir Richard Joseph St Lawrence Gethin, 10th Baronet (born 1949)

The heir presumptive is the present holder's first cousin Anthony Michael Gethin (born 1939). His heir apparent is his son Nicholas Richard Tristram Gethin (born 1965), followed by his son Alistair Richard Tristram Gethin (born 1999).
