= William Gethin =

English cricketer

Personal information
- Full name: William George Gethin
- Born: 4 May 1877; Kidderminster, Worcestershire, England
- Died: 4 November 1939 (aged 62); Kidderminster, Worcestershire, England
- Batting: Right-handed
- Bowling: Right-arm medium
- Relatives: SJ Gethin (brother)

Career statistics
Competition	FC
Matches	1
Runs scored	20
Batting average	10.60
100s/50s	0/0
Top score	19
Balls bowled	72
Wickets	0
Bowling average	-
5 wickets in innings	0
10 wickets in match	0
Best bowling	-
Catches/stumpings	2/0
- Source: CricketArchive, 24 September 2009

William George Gethin (4 May 1877 – 4 November 1939) was an English cricketer, who played a single first-class game for Worcestershire in 1921, when already aged 44. He scored 19 and 1, and held two catches.

Gethin had earlier played for Kidderminster Cricket Club in the Birmingham Premier League. In August 1900 he took 8/33 against West Bromwich Dartmouth.

His elder brother Stanley played four times for Worcestershire at the turn of the twentieth century.
