= Charles Montagu, 1st Earl of Halifax =

British politician and poet (1661–1715)

The Right Honourable The Earl of Halifax KG PC FRS
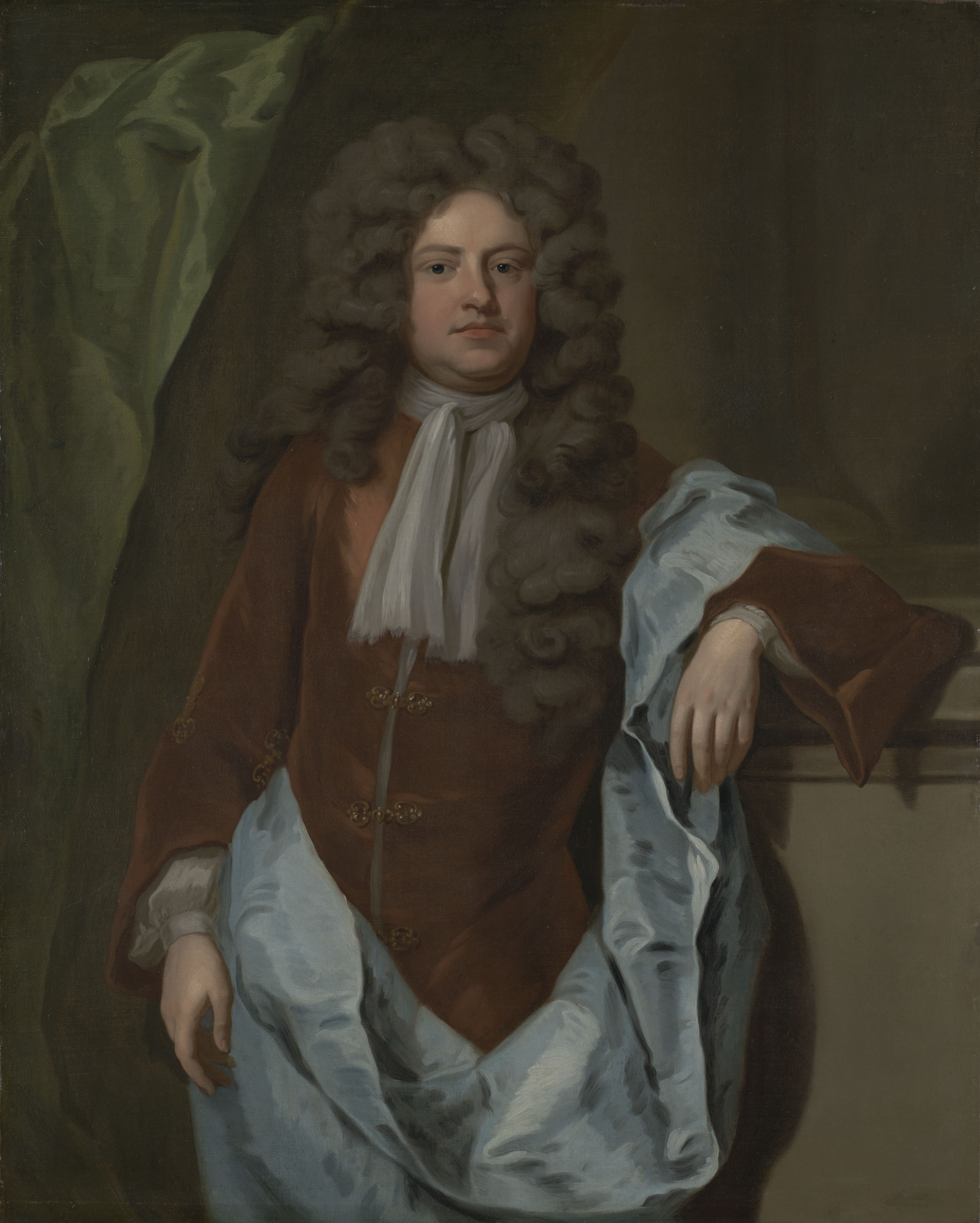
- Portrait attributed to Michael Dahl

Chief Minister of Great Britain First Lord of the Treasury
- In office 13 October 1714 – 19 May 1715
- Monarch: George I
- Preceded by: The Duke of Shrewsbury as Lord High Treasurer
- Succeeded by: The Earl of Carlisle
- In office 1 May 1697 – 15 November 1699
- Monarch: William III
- Preceded by: The Lord Godolphin
- Succeeded by: The Earl of Tankerville

10th President of the Royal Society
- In office 1695–1698
- Preceded by: Sir Robert Southwell
- Succeeded by: John Somers

Chancellor of the Exchequer
- In office 3 May 1694 – 31 May 1699
- Monarchs: William III and Mary II
- Preceded by: Richard Hampden
- Succeeded by: John Smith

Commissioner of the Treasury
- In office 21 March 1692 – 3 May 1694
- Monarchs: William III and Mary II
- Preceded by: Thomas Pelham
- Succeeded by: John Smith and William Trumbull

Personal details
- Born: 16 April 1661 Horton, Northamptonshire; Kingdom of England
- Died: 19 May 1715 (aged 54)
- Spouse(s): The Dowager Countess of Manchester, née Anne Yelverton
- Relations: Henry Montagu, 1st Earl of Manchester, paternal grandfather
- Parent: George Montagu (father)
- Profession: Politician, poet

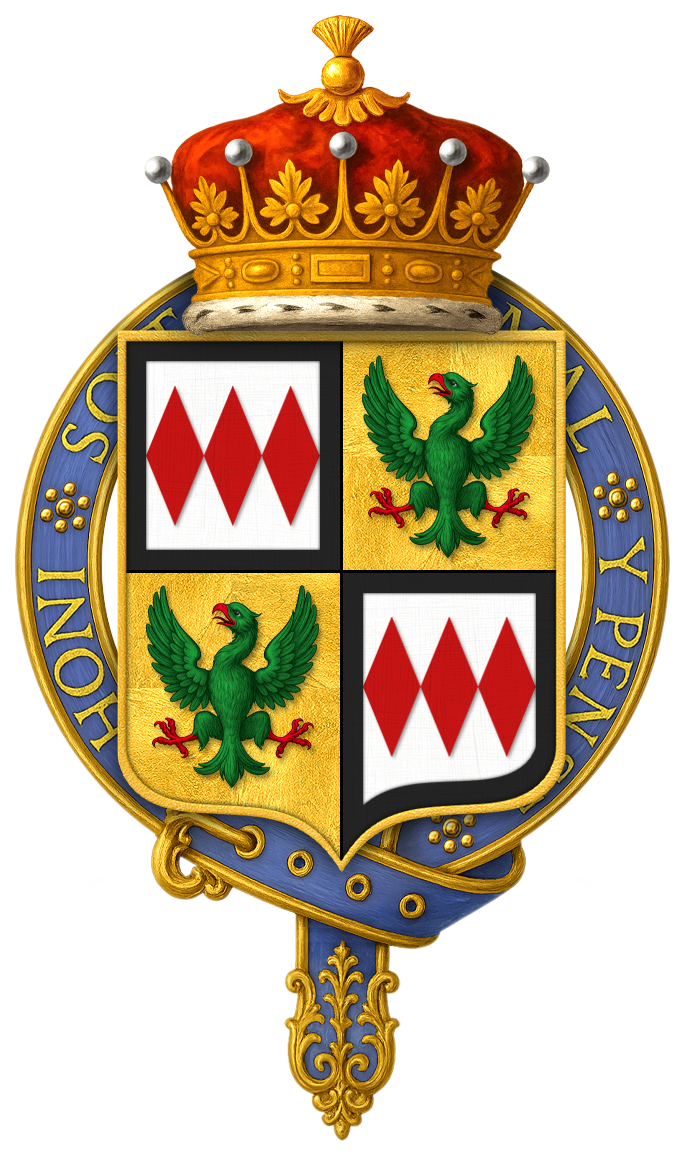
Quartered arms of Charles Montagu, 1st Earl of Halifax, KG, PC, FRS

Charles Montagu, 1st Earl of Halifax (16 April 1661 – 19 May 1715) was a British politician and poet. He was the grandson of the 1st Earl of Manchester and was eventually ennobled himself, first as Baron Halifax in 1700 and later as Earl of Halifax in 1714. As one of the four members of the so-called Whig Junto, Montagu played a major role in English politics under the reigns of King William III and Queen Anne. He served as Chancellor of the Exchequer from 1694 to 1699 and as First Lord of the Treasury from 1714 until his death the following year. He was also president of the Royal Society and a patron of the scientist Isaac Newton.

== Early life ==
Charles Montagu was born in Horton, Northamptonshire, to Elizabeth Irby and George Montagu, fifth son of the 1st Earl of Manchester. He was educated first in the country, and then at Westminster School, where he was chosen as a Queen's Scholar in 1677, and entered into close friendship with George Stepney.

In 1679 Montagu was admitted to Trinity College, Cambridge. At the time his relation, Dr. John Montagu, was Master of Trinity College and took him under his wing. While studying at Cambridge Montagu began a lasting association with Isaac Newton. He graduated with an MA in 1682 and became a Fellow of Trinity in 1683.

Two portraits of Montagu by Godfrey Kneller are in the college collection.

In 1685, Montagu's verses on the death of King Charles II made such an impression on the Earl of Dorset that he was invited to town and introduced to other entertainments. In 1687, Montagu joined with Matthew Prior in The City Mouse and the Country Mouse, a burlesque of John Dryden's The Hind and the Panther. Shortly before the Glorious Revolution, he married his cousin's widow, the Dowager Countess of Manchester. In the 1689 election, with the support of the Earl of Dorset and the Lord Lieutenant of Essex, the Earl of Oxford, he successfully contested the Maldon constituency against the Tory Sir John Bramston. Montagu sat for Maldon in the Convention Parliament of 1689. He also purchased for £1,500 a position as Clerk of the Council, to which he was appointed on 21 February 1689. He was returned for Maldon again without a contest at the 1690 election.

== Political office ==
In 1691, having become a member of the House of Commons, he argued in favour of a law to grant the assistance of counsel in trials for high treason. He became flustered in the middle of his speech, and upon recovering himself, observed "how reasonable it was to allow counsel to men called as criminals before a court of justice, when it appeared how much the presence of that assembly could disconcert one of their own body".

After the House of Commons he rose quickly, becoming one of the Commissioners of the Treasury and a member of the Privy Council. In 1694 he became Chancellor of the Exchequer, in reward for devising the establishment of the Bank of England, the plan which had been proposed by William Paterson three years before but not acted upon. After an unsuccessful attempt to supplant the Earl of Sunderland's leadership with the Whigs, he was compelled to reconcile with him in August 1695. With the support of Sunderland and the Court, Montagu was returned to Parliament for the Westminster constituency in October 1695. In the same year he was involved in the successful recoinage project. In 1698, having been appointed to the first Commission of the Treasury, he was also one of the regency in the King's absence. The next year he was made Auditor of the Exchequer, and the year after was created Baron Halifax, of Halifax in the County of Yorkshire, with remainder to his nephew George Montagu. His impeachment by the Commons failed, when the Articles were dismissed by the House of Lords.

John Macky relates a short description of the circumstances leading up to Charles, Lord Halifax's impeachment, in the Secret Service Papers published by his son in 1733.

...But as all courtiers, who rise too quick, as he did, are envied, so his great Favour with the King, and powerful Interest in the House, raised a great Party against him, which he strengthened, by seeming to despise them. The Deficiency of Parliamentary Funds, and the growing Debts of the Nation, by the great Interest of Paper Credit, laid him but too much open to these Attacks, he having the whole Administration of the Revenue. When he saw the Party growing too strong for him in the House of Commons, he prudently got himself made a Lord; and as a Screen from all Objections against his Administration, quitted his Management of Commissioner, to serve as Auditor: But his Enemies did not quit him so, they followed him into the House of Peers with an Impeachment, and so left no Stone unturned, to get him out of his Employ, bespattering him every Day with Pamphlets.

—Memoirs of the Secret Services of John Macky Esq., pp. 51–54.

On the accession of Queen Anne, Montagu was dismissed from the Council, and in the first Parliament of her reign was again attacked by the Commons, and again escaped by the protection of the Lords. In 1704 he wrote an answer to Bromley's speech against occasional conformity. He headed the inquiry into the danger of the Church. In 1706 he proposed and negotiated the Union with Scotland and when the Elector of Hanover received the Garter, after the Act had passed for securing the Protestant Succession, he was appointed to carry the ensigns of the Order to the Electoral Court. He sat as one of the judges of Henry Sacheverell, but voted for a mild sentence. Being now no longer in favour, he obtained a writ for summoning the Electoral Prince to Parliament as Duke of Cambridge.

== Earl of Halifax ==
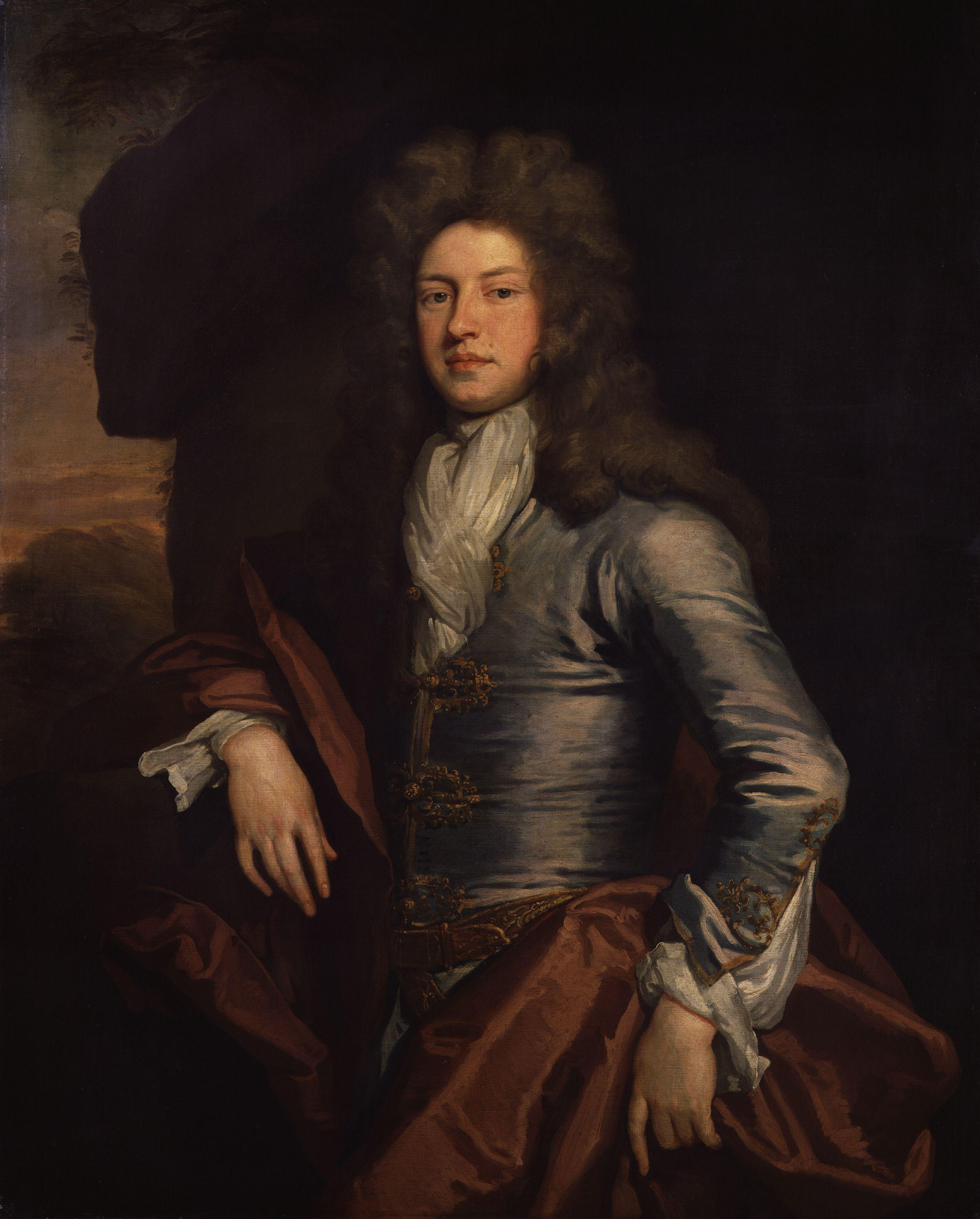
Charles Montagu was made Viscount Sunbury and Earl of Halifax at the accession of George I.

At the Queen's death Montagu was again appointed one of the regents. At the accession of George I, he was made Viscount Sunbury and Earl of Halifax, with remainder to heirs male, a Knight of the Garter, and First Lord of the Treasury, with a grant to his nephew of the reversion of the Auditorship of the Exchequer. Shortly afterwards he died of an inflammation of his lungs. The viscountcy and earldom became extinct on his death as he had no sons while he was succeeded in the barony according to the special remainder by his nephew George Montagu.

Halifax is reported to have left Catherine Barton, Newton's niece, a sizable inheritance for "her excellent conversation", as John Flamsteed wryly reported at the time. Many of his possessions were auctioned by Christopher Cock on 25 March 1740 at his room in the Great Piazza, Covent Garden.

Alexander Pope commemorated the Earl's death in his unpublished poem "Farewell to London in the Year 1715":

The love of arts lies cold and dead
In Halifax's urn,
And not one Muse of all he fed
Has yet the grace to mourn.

== See also ==
- Whig Junto
- List of presidents of the Royal Society

== Bibliography ==
- Cooper, C. H. (1861). Memoirs of Cambridge. Macmillan.
- Johnson, Samuel (2006). The Lives of the Most Eminent English Poets. Roger Lonsdale, editor. Oxford University Press.
- Thomson, A. T. (1871). The Wits and Beaux of Society. Routledge.
- Handley, Stuart (2004). "Charles Montagu, Earl of Halifax." Oxford Dictionary of National Biography. Oxford University Press online edn, Oct 2005.

Parliament of England
Preceded by Sir John Bramston; Sir Thomas Darcy	Member of Parliament for Maldon; 1689–1695; With: Sir John Bramston 1689–1693; Sir Eliab Harvey 1693–1695	Succeeded by Irby Montagu; Sir Eliab Harvey
Preceded by Sir Walter Clarges, Bt; Sir Stephen Fox	Member of Parliament for Westminster; 1695–1701; With: Sir Stephen Fox 1695–1698; James Vernon 1698–1701	Succeeded by Sir Thomas Crosse; James Vernon
Political offices
Preceded by Richard Hampden	Chancellor of the Exchequer; 1694–1699	Succeeded by John Smith
Preceded by The Lord Godolphin	First Lord of the Treasury; 1697–1699	Succeeded by The Earl of Tankerville
Preceded by Christopher Montagu	Auditor of the Exchequer; 1699–1714	Succeeded by George Montagu
Preceded by The Duke of Shrewsbury as Lord High Treasurer	First Lord of the Treasury; 1714–1715	Succeeded by The Earl of Carlisle
Honorary titles
Preceded by The Duke of Northumberland	Lord Lieutenant of Surrey; 1714–1715	Succeeded by The Duke of Argyll
Peerage of Great Britain
New creation	Earl of Halifax; 2nd creation 1714–1715	Extinct
Peerage of England
New creation	Baron Halifax; 1700–1715	Succeeded by George Montagu
Professional and academic associations
Preceded by Sir Robert Southwell	10th President of the Royal Society; 1695–1698	Succeeded by The Lord Somers
