= Sir Thomas Clarges, 2nd Baronet =

English politician

Sir Thomas Clarges, 2nd Baronet (25 July 1688 – 19 February 1759), of Aston, near Stevenage, Hertfordshire, was an English politician who sat in the House of Commons from 1713 to 1715.

Clarges was the eldest surviving son of Sir Walter Clarges, 1st Baronet, whom he succeeded circa 31 March 1706 and was educated at St Paul's School.

Clarges was a Member of Parliament for Lostwithiel from 1713 to 1715.

Clarges was appointed a Gentleman of the privy chamber by 1734 until his death. He married twice; firstly Katherine, the daughter and coheiress of John Berkeley, 4th Viscount Fitzhardinge and secondly Frances, with whom he had a son Thomas, who predeased him. He was succeeded by his grandson Thomas.

Parliament of Great Britain
| Preceded by Hugh Fortescue; John Hill | Member of Parliament for Lostwithiel; 1713 – 1715; With: Erasmus Lewis | Succeeded by Thomas Liddell; Galfridus Walpole |
Baronetage of England
| Preceded by Walter Clarges | Baronet (of St Martin's in the Fields); 1706-1751 | Succeeded by Thomas Clarges |
