= Sir Richard Gethin, 1st Baronet =

Sir Richard Gethin, 1st Baronet (c. 1615 – 1679) was an Anglo-Irish politician.

Gethin was the Member of Parliament for Clonmel in the Irish House of Commons from 1639 to 1649. Following the Stuart Restoration, he was granted land in Fermoy, County Cork on the condition that he establish an English colony there; he subsequently named the manor Gethinsgrott. Between 1661 and 1666 he represented Newtown Limavady in the Irish Commons. On 1 August 1665 Gethin was created a baronet, of Gethinsgrott in the Baronetage of Ireland, by Charles II of England. In 1675 he was made a member of the Privy Council of Ireland.

He was succeeded in his title by his grandson, also called Richard.

Parliament of Ireland
Preceded by Geoffrey Barron; Henry fitz Nicholas White	Member of Parliament for Clonmel; 1639–1649; With: William Smythe	Succeeded by Sir Thomas Stanley; Sir Francis Foulke
Preceded by Dudley Philips; John Usher	Member of Parliament for Newtown Limavady; 1661–1666; With: George Philips	Succeeded by Hugh Rowley; Sir John Topham
Baronetage of Ireland
New creation	Baronet (of Gethinsgrott); 1665–1679	Succeeded by Richard Gethin
