= Sir Thomas Clarges, 3rd Baronet =

English politician

Annuity (Heirs of Sir Thomas Clarges) Act 1799
- Act of Parliament
- Parliament of Great Britain
- Long title: An act to enable the lords commissioners of the treasury to contract with the most noble Charles duke of Richmond, for the absolute purchase of the property of the said duke, and all others interested in a certain duty of twelve pence per chaldron on coals shipped in the river Tyne to be consumed in England, and to grant a compensation for the same, by way of annuity payable out of the consolidated fund.
- Citation: 39 Geo. 3. c. 84
- Territorial extent: Great Britain

Dates
- Royal assent: 12 July 1799
- Commencement: 12 July 1799 (Note: The Acts of Parliament (Commencement) Act 1793.)
- Repealed: 22 September 1893
Other legislation
Repealed by	Statute Law Revision (No. 2) Act 1893

Status: Repealed

Text of statute as originally enacted

Sir Thomas Clarges, 3rd Baronet (1751–1782) was an English politician who sat in the House of Commons from 1780 to 1782.

Clarges was the son of Thomas Clarges of Aston, Hertfordshire and his wife Anne Shute of John Shute, 1st Viscount Barrington and was born on 4 October 1751. He succeeded his grandfather Sir Thomas Clarges, 2nd Baronet in the baronetcy on 19 February 1759. He was educated Eton College in 1765 and matriculated at Christ Church, Oxford in 1770. He married Louisa Skrine, daughter of William Skrine on 20 October 1777.

Clarges was elected Member of Parliament for Lincoln at the 1780 general election and held the seat until his death on 23 December 1782.

== Notes ==
Parliament of Great Britain
Preceded by Robert Vyner; Viscount Lumley	Member of Parliament for Lincoln; 1780 – 1783; With: Robert Vyner	Succeeded by Robert Vyner; John Fenton-Cawthorne
Baronetage of England
Preceded by Thomas Clarges	Baronet (of St Martin's in the Fields); 1751-1782	Succeeded by Thomas Clarges
