= Clarges baronets =

Extinct baronetcy in the Baronetage of England

The Clarges Baronetcy, of St Martin's in the Fields in the County of Middlesex, was a title in the Baronetage of England. It was created on 30 October 1674 for Walter Clarges, subsequently Member of Parliament for Colchester and Westminster. He was the son of Sir Thomas Clarges. Sir Walter was succeeded by his son, Thomas, the second Baronet. He represented Lostwithiel in Parliament. He was succeeded by his grandson, Thomas, the third Baronet, the son of Thomas Clarges. The third Baronet sat as member of parliament for Lincoln. The title became extinct on the death of his son, Thomas, the fourth Baronet, in 1834.

== Clarges baronets, of St Martin's in the Fields (1674) ==
- Sir Walter Clarges, 1st Baronet (1653–1706)
- Sir Thomas Clarges, 2nd Baronet (1688–1759)
  - Thomas Clarges (c. 1721–1753)
- Sir Thomas Clarges, 3rd Baronet (1751–1782)
- Sir Thomas Clarges, 4th Baronet (c. 1780–1834)
