= Sir Walter Clarges, 1st Baronet =

English politician

Sir Walter Clarges, 1st Baronet (4 July 1653 – March 1705/6) was an English Tory politician who served four separate terms in Parliament. An early ally of William of Orange, he inherited large holdings of land but no great ability from his father, Sir Thomas Clarges, and largely used his Parliamentary seat to advance his own business and financial interests.

== Early career ==
Clarges matriculated at Merton College, Oxford on 3 February 1670/1. On 30 October 1674 he was created a baronet, an honour which his father had sought for him; Clarges' father was one of the oldest and most respected of the Country Party. As soon as he had come of age in 1674, his father sought for him a seat in Parliament, intending him to stand for Clitheroe; however he was ordered to make way for a nominee of the Duke of Albemarle, his cousin.

== Exclusion Parliament ==
Appointed a captain in the Duke of Monmouth's Regiment of Foot in 1678, Clarges transferred to the Royal Dragoons the next year, the same year as he was elected Member of Parliament for Colchester in the general election. He was made a Freeman of Maldon. In Parliament he was with his father in opposition to the efforts to remove the (Catholic) Duke of York from the line of succession to the throne. These efforts were unsuccessful and Clarges lost his seat at the 1681 election when Titus Oates told the electors that he was a Papist. Also in 1681 he became a Major in the 1st Troop of Horse Guards.

== Dueling ==
When the Duke of Albemarle fought a duel with Lord Grey of Warke in 1682, he chose Clarges to act as his second. Albemarle and Clarges both survived but came off worst in the duel, with Clarges being wounded and disarmed by Grey's second, Charles Godfrey.

== Opposing James II ==
Re-elected in 1685 after the Duke ascended the throne as James II, Clarges made his mark in Parliament as an opponent of the King's religious policies. Starting out as a conciliator, James II progressively moved to increase the involvement of the Roman Catholic Church in official life; Clarges drew attention to, and denounced each change. He resigned his commission in the army in October 1685, probably as a protest against the employment of Roman Catholic officers. He became a Freeman of Oxford in 1687. When William of Orange landed, Clarges was sent by his father (said to be 'at great expense') to attend upon him at Exeter in November 1688.

== Election for Westminster ==
In the 1690 general election, Clarges had the assistance of his fathers' resources and personal influence in seeking election in Westminster as a Tory. Running with Sir William Pulteney (who was a business partner of his father), they beat the two Whig candidates so easily that their opponents withdrew two days before the close of the poll. Clarges suspected the motives and patriotism of the Whigs, who had fought for the exclusion of the Duke of York; he described them as "now making excuses for those, who most people think guilty of the basest and most dishonourable action that was ever done in this nation".

Clarges was largely inactive in the Parliament, his only major action being to supervise the later House of Commons stages of a Private bill to clarify the law on the new parish of St Anne which had been carved out of the parish of St Martin-in-the-Fields in 1686. The Bill had been initiated by his father, who owned a large amount of land in the parish.

== Election difficulties ==
At the 1695 general election, Clarges (who had just recovered from a serious illness) had a more difficult fight. His father died on 4 October just as the fight was at its height. Despite the support of the Bishop of London and the Duke of Leeds, Clarges was clearly behind on the show of hands on 24 October (on which he distributed £2,000 in bribes). He demanded a poll but finished some 700 votes behind.

His new inheritance brought him land worth £5,000 a year, and it added to the wealth he had gained by marrying his third wife Elizabeth Gould in December 1690; Mrs Gould was the coheiress of a wealthy City draper. He declined to fight Westminster in the 1698 general election, but in 1701 found himself in need of a position in Parliament after granting a lease over land in Piccadilly to Thomas Neale. Under the terms of the lease, Neale was to spend £10,000 developing the land, and then pay rent to Clarges; however, Neale became insolvent and defaulted. Clarges could be sure of repossessing the land by passing a Private Bill, and stood in the January general election of 1701. The Court interest was against him and he finished fourth with 1,177 votes; the winners had more than twice as many.

== Return to favour ==
Notwithstanding his exclusion from Parliament, Clarges petitioned for his Bill but saw it defeated at second reading by Neale's friends on 2 May 1701. Fortunately for Clarges, he recovered the property by some other means and developed it himself. At the general election in 1702 he stood again in Westminster, after the accession of Queen Anne; the new Queen was a Tory supporter and so the Court interest was now on the side. The contest went to a poll and was very close, and a scrutiny of the votes was ordered, but at the end Clarges was elected with a small majority.

== Parliamentary activity ==
His first action in Parliament was to use Parliamentary privilege to commit a business enemy, William Sherwin, to jail. Sherwin had been involved in a long-running inheritance dispute over Clarges' estate in Yorkshire at Sutton upon Derwent, which the Clarges had inherited from Clarges' cousin the Duke of Albemarle. Sherwin contended that the Duke's mother's first husband, who had disappeared, was still alive making their marriage null and him the rightful owner of the property; he had failed to persuade several courts to support him, but nevertheless started to run the estate as his own. On 8 December, the House of Commons ordered Sherwin imprisoned.

Clarges also held a £500 pension granted originally to his father which came from the product of a 12d duty on coal shipped from Newcastle upon Tyne. He was appointed to report from a committee that the Newcastle coalowners were deliberately profiteering, and introduced a Bill to regulate coal shipments, although he did not pursue the matter.

== Retirement ==
In poor health in 1704, Clarges decided not to defend his seat at the 1705 general election. He died in March 1706, being survived by his eight sons and four daughters (one daughter had predeceased him), from three marriages.

Parliament of England
Preceded by John Shaw	Member of Parliament for Colchester; 1679–1681; With: Sir Harbottle Grimston	Succeeded by Samuel Reynolds
Preceded by Sir Harbottle Grimston; Samuel Reynolds	Member of Parliament for Colchester; 1685–1687; With: Nathanial Lawrence	Succeeded by Samuel Reynolds; Isaac Rebow
Preceded by Sir William Pulteney; Philip Howard	Member of Parliament for Westminster; 1690–1695; With: Sir William Pulteney 1690–1691; Sir Stephen Fox 1691–1695	Succeeded by Sir Stephen Fox; Charles Montagu
Preceded by James Vernon; Sir Henry Dutton Colt	Member of Parliament for Westminster; 1702–1705; With: Thomas Crosse	Succeeded by Hon. Henry Boyle; Sir Henry Dutton Colt
Baronetage of the United Kingdom
New title Granted by King Charles II	Baronet (of St Martin in the Fields); 1674–1706	Succeeded by Thomas Clarges
Notes and references
1. "Return of Members of Parliament", 1878, 69-I
