= Colt baronets =

Title in the Baronetage of England

The Colt Baronetcy, of St James's-in-the-Fields in the Liberty of Westminster in the County of Middlesex, is a title in the Baronetage of England. It was created on 2 March 1694 for Henry Colt, Adjutant to Prince Rupert of the Rhine and member of parliament for Newport and Westminster. The title was created with remainder to his younger brother John Dutton Colt, Member of Parliament for Leominster. Sir Henry died childless and was succeeded according to the special remainder by his great-nephew, the second Baronet. He was the grandson of John Colt.

The Colt family descended from Thomas Colt, of Essex and Suffolk, Keeper of the Rolls of Chancery in Ireland and a member of Edward IV's Privy Council. George Colt, great-grandfather of the first Baronet, was High Sheriff of Suffolk in 1586. Sir William Dutton Colt, brother of the first Baronet, was Master of the Horse to Prince Rupert of the Rhine and Envoy to the courts of Hanover and Saxony.

== Colt baronets, of St James's-in-the-Fields (1694) ==
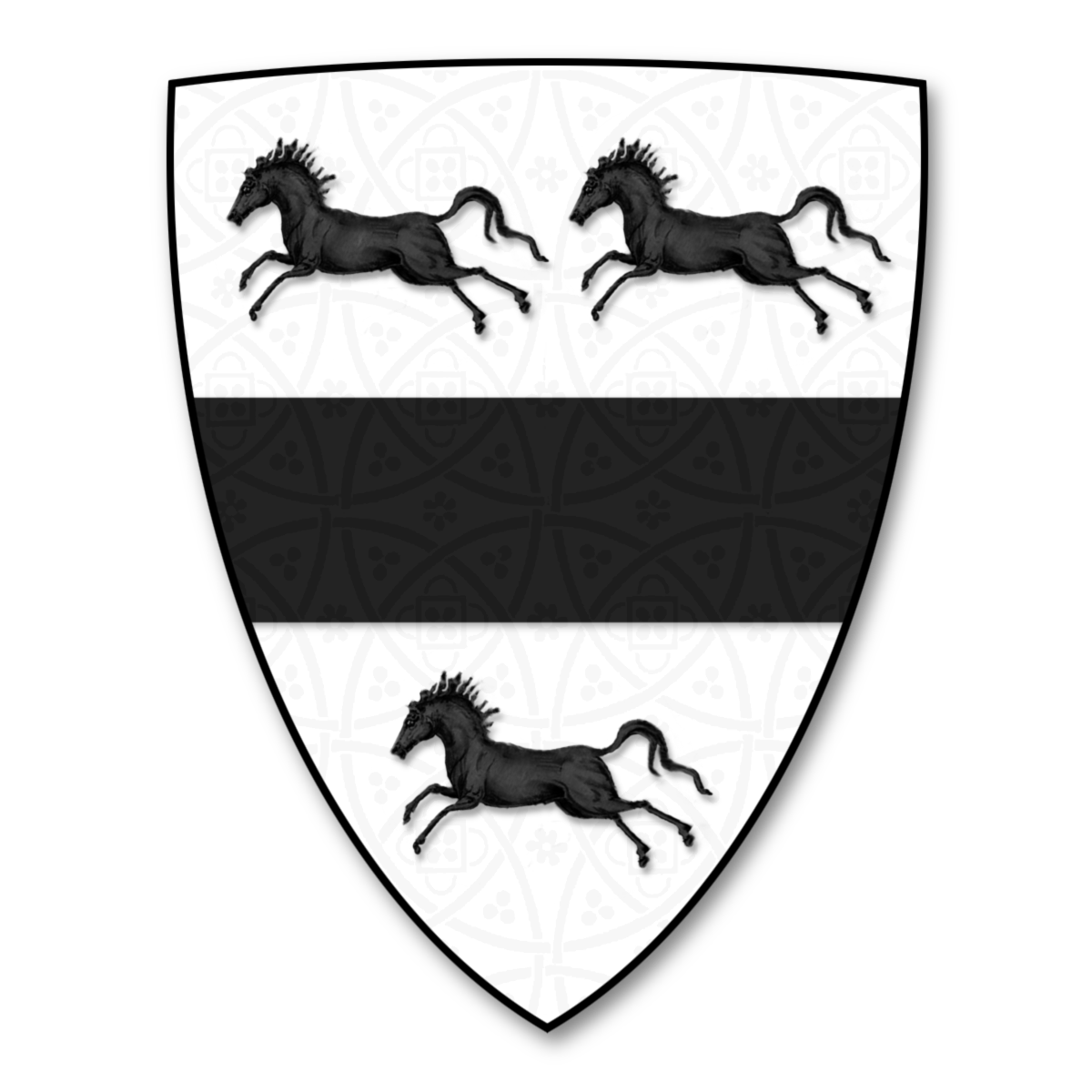
Escutcheon of the Colt baronets of St James's-in-the-Fields

- Sir Henry Dutton Colt, 1st Baronet (c. 1646–1731)
- Sir John Dutton Colt, 2nd Baronet (1725–1809)
- Sir John Dutton Colt, 3rd Baronet (c. 1750–1810)
- Sir John Dutton Colt, 4th Baronet (1774–1845)
- Sir Edward Vaughan Colt, 5th Baronet (c. 1781–1849)
- Sir Edward Harry Vaughan Colt, 6th Baronet (1808–1882)
- Sir Thomas Archer Colt, 7th Baronet (1815–1893)
- Sir Edward Harry Dutton Colt, 8th Baronet (1850–1931)
- Sir Henry Archer Colt, 9th Baronet (1882–1951)
- Sir Edward William Dutton Colt, 10th Baronet (born 1936)

There is no heir to the baronetcy.
