= Charlotte Hussey =

Charlotte Hussey may refer to:

- Charlotte Hussey (poet), Canadian poet, literary critic and English professor
- Charlotte Hussey (researcher) (1864–1956), Irish researcher and administrator for the Garden Tomb association
