= Garden Tomb =

Ancient tomb in Jerusalem of possible Biblical significance

- بستان قبر المسيح (Arabic) גן הקבר (Hebrew)
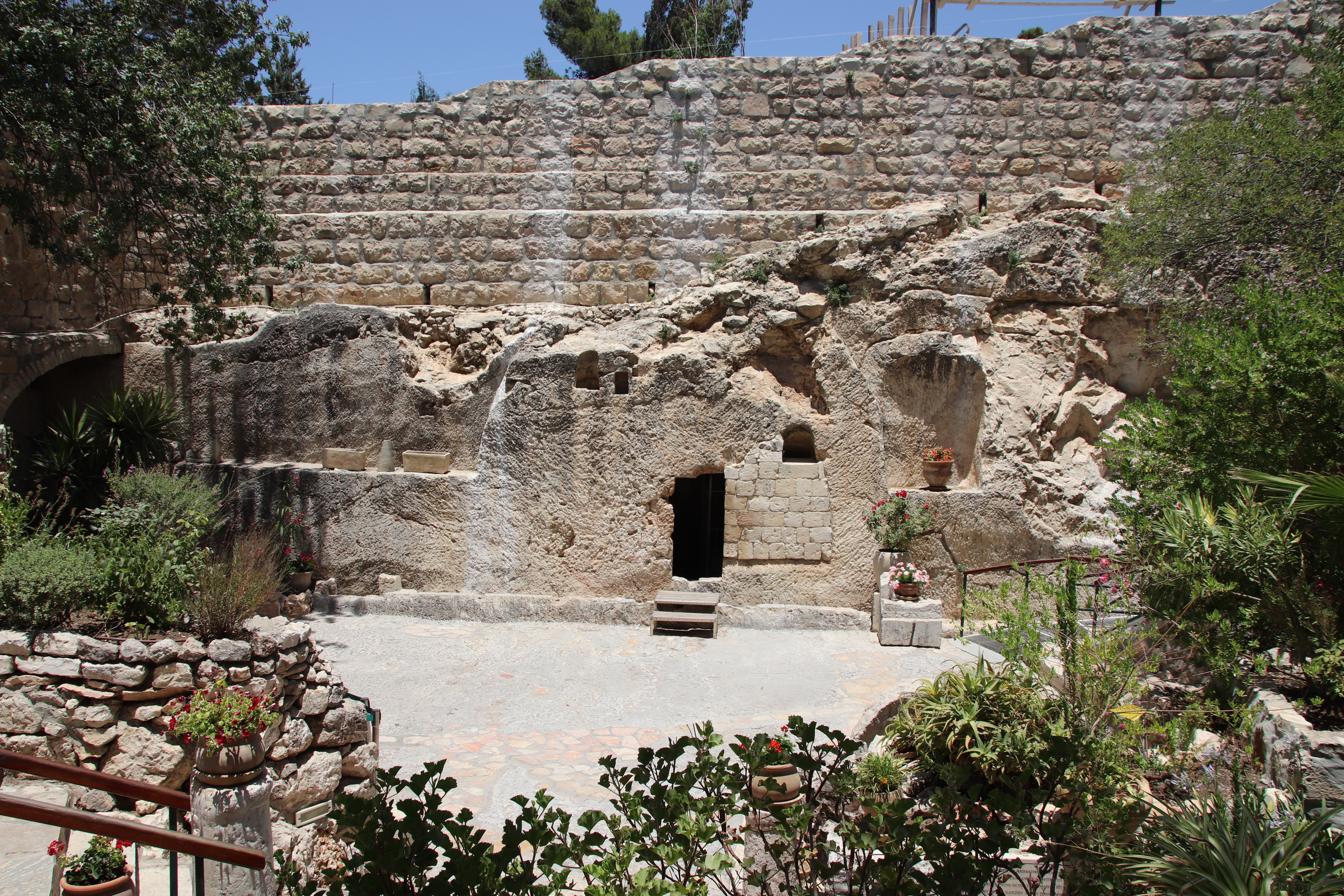
- The entrance to the rock-cut tomb
- Interactive map of Garden Tomb
- 31°47′1.87″N 35°13′47.92″E
- Type: Rock-cut tomb
- Periods: Iron Age II
- Cultures: Kingdom of Judah
- Location: Jerusalem

History
- Built: 8th–7th century BC

Site notes
- Owner: Garden Tomb (Jerusalem) Association
- Public access: Yes
- Website: gardentomb.com

The Garden Tomb (Arabic: بستان قبر المسيح, romanized: Bustān Qabr al-Masīḥ, lit. 'the Garden of the Tomb of Christ'; Hebrew: גן הקבר, romanized: Gan ha-Kéver, lit. 'Garden of the Tomb') is an ancient rock-cut tomb surrounded by a garden, right outside the walls of ancient Jerusalem, that functions as a site of Christian pilgrimage attracting hundreds of thousands of annual visitors, especially Evangelicals and other Protestants, as some Protestant Christians consider it to be the empty tomb where Jesus of Nazareth resurrected. This is in contrast to an older tradition that locates the death, burial, and resurrection of Jesus at a site roughly 600 metres (0.37 mi) to the south known as Golgotha and located within the Church of the Holy Sepulchre.

The Garden Tomb and its surrounding gardens are adjacent to a rocky outcrop known as Skull Hill (Arabic: تلة الجمجمة, romanized: Tallat al-Jumjumah; Hebrew: גבעת הגולגולת, romanized: Giv'át ha-Gulgólet). In the mid-nineteenth century, some Christian scholars proposed that Skull Hill is Golgotha, where the Romans crucified Jesus. A few decades later, in 1867, the Garden Tomb was discovered and later proposed to be the tomb of Jesus.

More recently, the Israeli archaeologist Gabriel Barkay points out that the tomb does not contain any features indicative of the 1st century CE, when Jesus was buried, and argues that the tomb is likely to have been created in the 8th–7th centuries BCE. The Italian archeologist Riccardo Lufrani argues instead that it should be dated to the Hellenistic era, the 4th–2nd centuries BCE. The re-use of old tombs was not an uncommon practice in ancient times, but this would seem to contradict the biblical text that speaks of a newly hewn tomb which Joseph of Arimathea made for himself (Matthew 27:57–60, John 19:41).

The organization that owns and maintains the Garden Tomb is a non-denominational charitable trust based in the United Kingdom named The Garden Tomb (Jerusalem) Association, a member of the Evangelical Alliance of Israel and the World Evangelical Alliance. It was formed by a number of evangelical Anglicans from the Church of England in 1885. The association refrains from claiming that the Garden Tomb is the authentic tomb of Jesus, and instead emphasizes the site's utility as a visual aid for the gospel accounts and its function as a place of Christian worship. The site draws hundreds of thousands of annual pilgrims, especially evangelicals and other Protestants.

== History of debate over the tomb's location ==
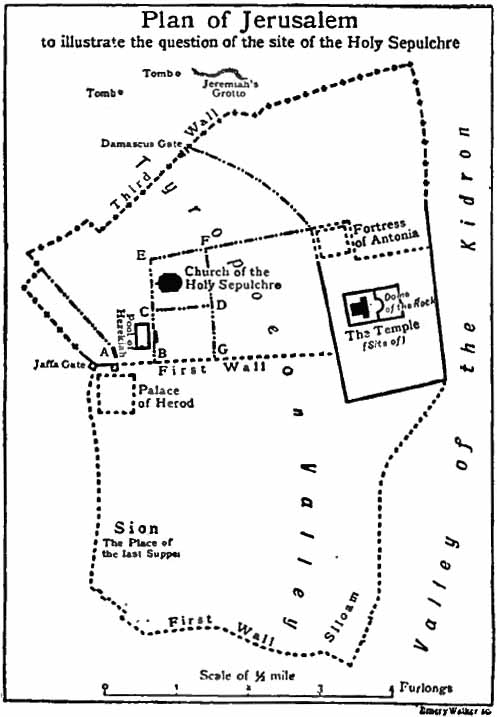
A 1911 map showing a reconstruction of the city walls of Jerusalem in the late Second Temple period. The tomb just to the left of Jeremiah's Grotto in the north is the Garden Tomb. Contemporary scholars no longer accept this reconstruction of the city walls.

According to the Bible, Jesus was crucified near the city of Jerusalem, outside its walls. The location of the Holy Sepulchre being inside the city walls of Jerusalem – which have changed and been expanded throughout history – has resulted in debate regarding the location of the tomb of Jesus, mostly following the Protestant Reformation in the 16th century.

=== Early medieval views ===
Early accounts of the discovery and location of the tomb of Jesus differ.

Emperor Hadrian had built during the 130s a temple to Venus over the supposed site of Jesus' tomb near Calvary, and renamed the city Aelia Capitolina and Judaea was renamed Syria Palaestina. Accounts differ concerning whether the temple was dedicated to Venus or Jupiter. According to Eusebius, Constantine destroyed the temple of Venus and discovered the burial site of Jesus in the spot. Later legends had Helena destroying the temple.

According to tradition, Helena ordered the temple torn down and, according to the legend that arose at the end of the 4th century, chose a site to begin excavating, which led to the recovery of three different crosses. The legend is recounted in Ambrose, On the Death of Theodosius (died 395) and at length in Rufinus' chapters appended to his translation into Latin of Eusebius's Ecclesiastical History, the main body of which does not mention the event. (Note: Noted in Stephenson 2010:253f, who observes "None of this is true", noting Rufinus' source in a lost work of Gelasius of Caesarea.) Then, Rufinus relates, the empress refused to be swayed by anything short of solid proof and performed a test. Possibly through Bishop Macarius of Jerusalem, she had a woman who was near death brought from the city. When the woman touched the first and second crosses, her condition did not change, but when she touched the third and final cross she suddenly recovered, and Helena declared the cross with which the woman had been touched to be the True Cross. On the site of discovery, Constantine ordered the building of the Church of the Holy Sepulchre.

Saewulf (c. 1108 CE), likely the earliest English pilgrim to Jerusalem and writing nearly three centuries later, maintained that it was Hadrian who enclosed the traditional Golgotha and Tomb of Christ within the city limits when he rebuilt the city during the second century CE, though they were previously outside the city. The two explanations contradict each other, since Hadrian's rebuilding of Jerusalem as Aelia Capitolina predated Helena's pilgrimage there by close to two centuries.

=== Doubts after Reformation ===
After the Protestant Reformation in the 16th century, doubts regarding places regarded as holy in the Catholic tradition grew. In 1639, Quaresmius wrote of "western heretics" who argued that the traditional site could not possibly be the true tomb of Christ. The first extant publication which argued a case against the traditional location was written by the German pilgrim Jonas Korte in 1741, a few years after his pilgrimage to Jerusalem. His book contained a chapter titled "On Mount Calvary, which now lies in the middle of the town and cannot therefore be the true Calvary".

=== 19th-century Protestant doubts ===
In 1812, Edward D. Clarke also rejected the traditional location as a "mere delusion, a monkish juggle", and suggested instead that the crucifixion took place just outside Zion Gate, which was built in 1540. During the 19th century travel from Europe to the Ottoman Empire became easier and therefore more common, especially in the late 1830s due to the reforms of the Egyptian ruler, Muhammad Ali. The subsequent influx of Christian pilgrims to Jerusalem included more Protestants who doubted the authenticity of the traditional holy sites, which were exacerbated by the fact that Protestants had no territorial claims at the Church of the Holy Sepulchre and by the feeling of Protestant pilgrims that it was an unnatural setting for contemplation and prayer.

In 1841, Dr. Edward Robinson's Biblical Researches in Palestine, at that time considered the standard work on the topography and archaeology of the Holy Land, argued against the authenticity of the traditional location, concluding: "Golgotha and the Tomb shown in the Church of the Holy Sepulchre are not upon the real places of the Crucifixion and Resurrection". Robinson argued that the traditional location would have been within the city walls also during the Herodian era, primarily due to topographical considerations. Robinson was careful not to propose an alternative site and had concluded that it would be impossible to identify the true location of the holy places. However, he did suggest that the crucifixion would have taken place somewhere on the road to Jaffa or the road to Damascus. Skull Hill and the Garden Tomb are located in close proximity to the Damascus road, about 200 m (660 ft) from Damascus Gate.

=== Contemporary scholarship ===
Contemporary scholars, such as Professor Dan Bahat, one of Israel's leading archaeologists, have concluded that the Church of the Holy Sepulchre is located in an area which was outside the city walls in the days of Jesus and therefore indeed constitutes a plausible location for the crucifixion and burial of Jesus.

== Discovery ==
=== Skull Hill identified as Calvary ===
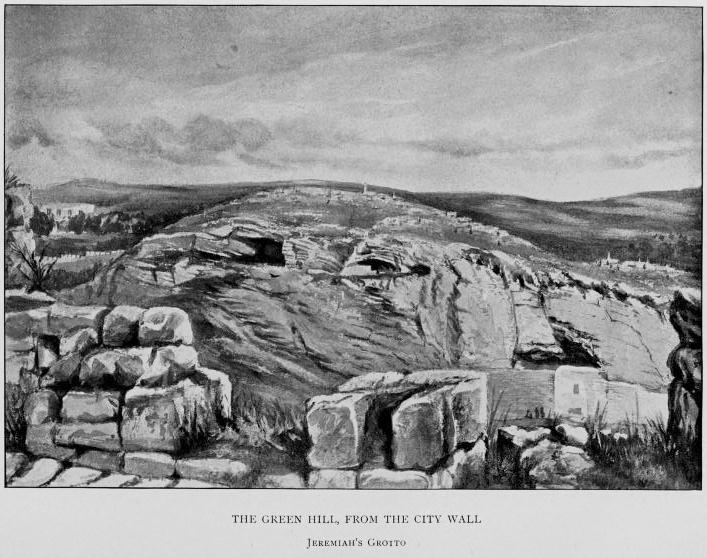
A sketch of Skull Hill created in 1889 by B. H. Harris. The caption below it reads: THE GREEN HILL, FROM THE CITY WALL; Jeremiah's Grotto.

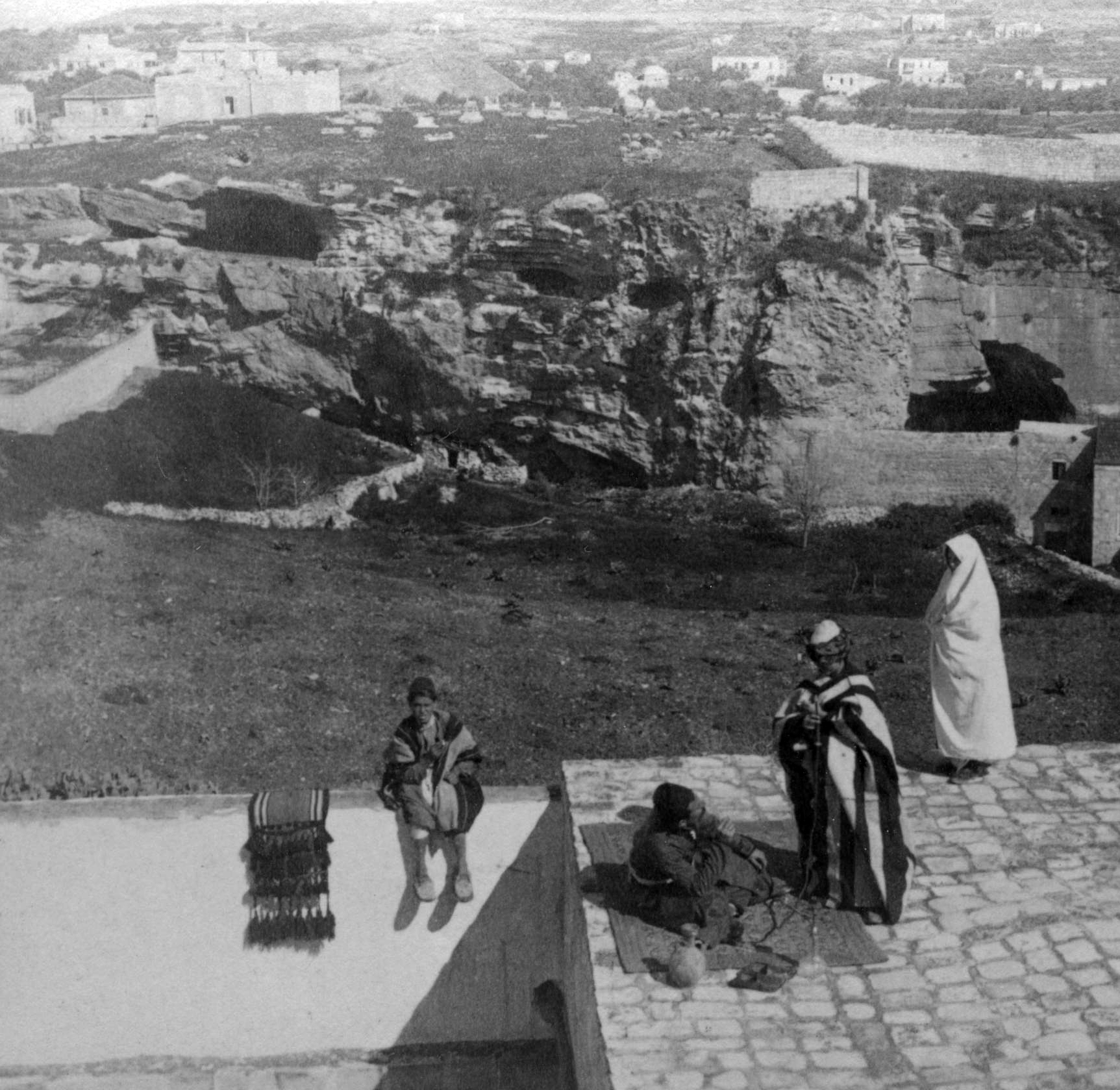
Skull Hill as seen in 1901 from the northern walls of Jerusalem's Old City.

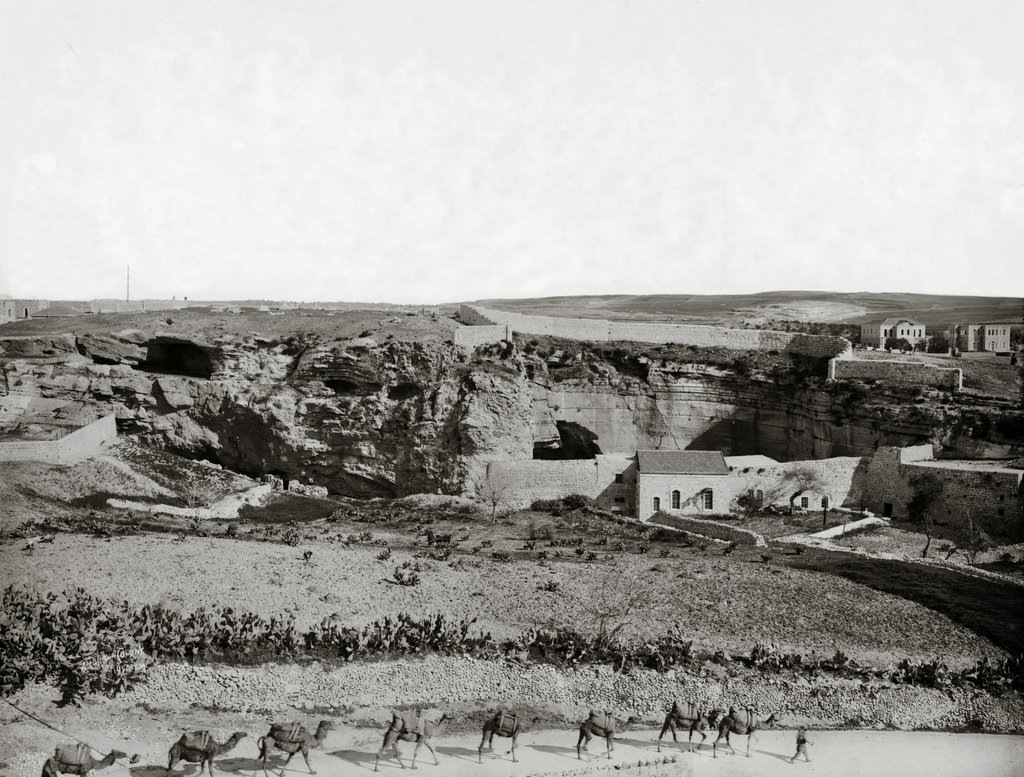
A view of Jeremiah's Grotto and Skull Hill from the south c. 1900

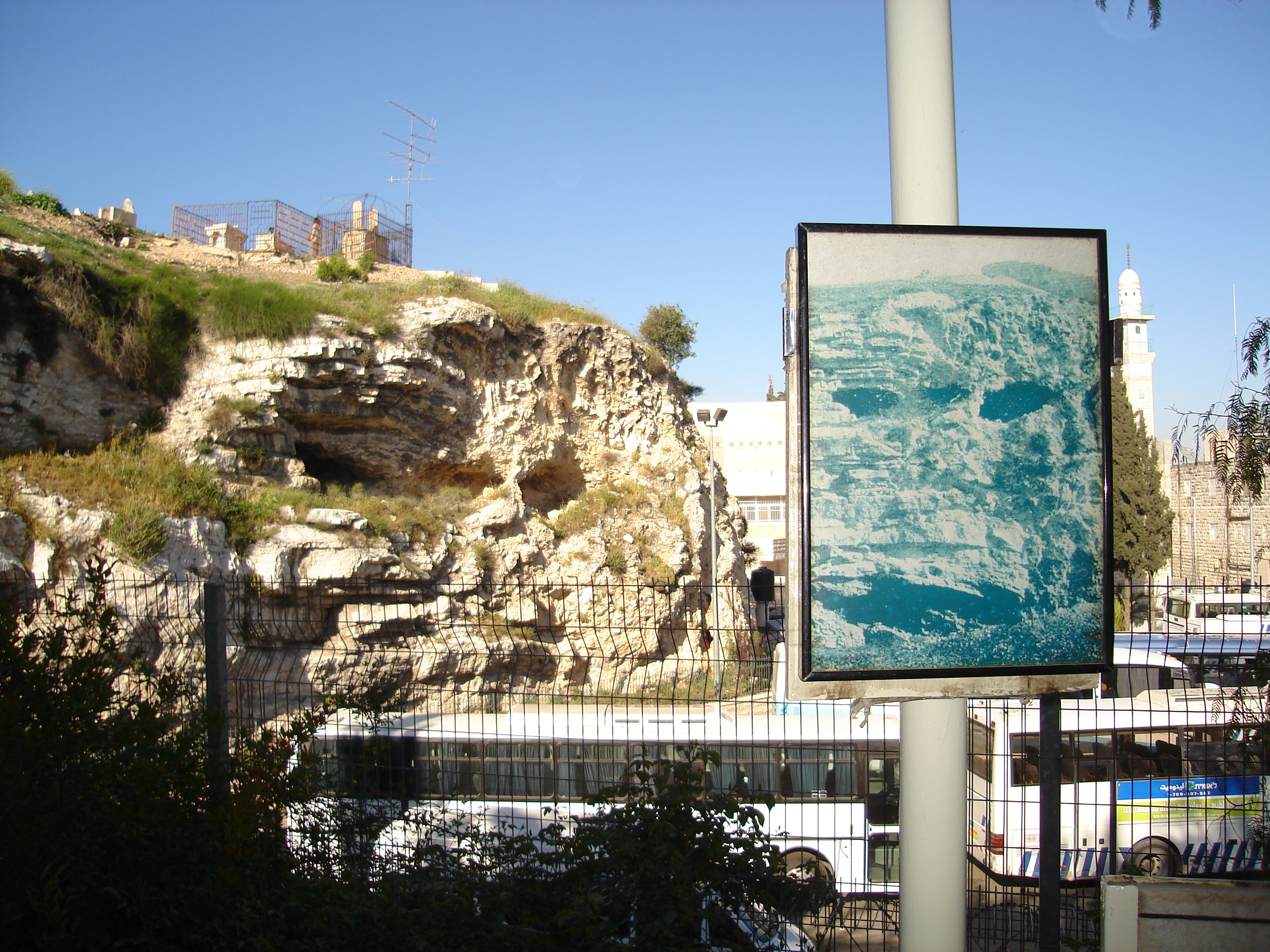
Wide view of the escarpment as seen from the Garden Tomb viewing platform. The picture in the foreground is a historical photograph (c. 1880) of the same rock face.

In the 19th century, many Protestants who felt that the Church of the Holy Sepulchre could not be the site of Jesus' tomb looked elsewhere in the attempt to locate the site of Jesus' crucifixion, burial and resurrection.

==== Otto Thenius ====
In 1842, heavily relying on Robinson's research, Otto Thenius, a German theologian and bible scholar from Dresden, was the first to publish a proposal that the rocky knoll north of Damascus Gate, which, as Thenius noticed, resembled a skull, was the biblical Golgotha. The site he suggested contains a few natural cavities as well as a man-made cave, which Christians call Jeremiah's Grotto. Thenius went so far as to suggest that Jeremiah's Grotto was in fact the tomb of Christ. Though his proposal for the tomb of Christ did not have a lasting influence, his proposal for Golgotha was endorsed by several other Protestant scholars and pilgrims. Since Golgotha is the Aramaic word for 'skull', and may perhaps refer to the shape of the place, Thenius concluded that the rocky escarpment was likely to have been Golgotha.

==== Fisher Howe ====
A few years later the same identification was endorsed by the American industrialist Fisher Howe, who was also one of the founding members of the board of directors of Union Theological Seminary in New York. In 1850, Howe visited the Holy Land, and endorsed the view that the Church of the Holy Sepulchre could not be the true site of Christ's death and resurrection. Instead, he pointed to the hill containing Jeremiah's Grotto as the true Calvary, though he had only argued this view in length in an essay published in 1871, just after his death. In that essay Howe described the hill in these terms: "[The] hill is left steeply rounded on its west, north, and east sides forming the back and sides of the kranion, or skull. The skull-like front, or face, on the south side is formed by the deep perpendicular cutting and removal of the ledge. To the observer, at a distance, the eyeless socket of the skull would be suggested at once by the yawning cavern, hewn within its face, beneath the hill." Howe claimed that he developed his theory completely independently of Otto Thenius, and that he stumbled upon Thenius' claims only in the course of researching for his essay.

==== H. B. Tristram ====
Another early proponent of the theory that Skull Hill is Golgotha was the English scholar and clergyman Canon Henry Baker Tristram, who suggested that identification in 1858 during his first visit to the Holy Land, chiefly because of its proximity to the northern gate, and hence also to the Antonia Fortress, the traditional site of Christ's trial. (Canon Tristram was also one of the advocates of purchasing the nearby Garden Tomb in 1893.)

==== Claude R. Conder ====
Another prominent proponent of the "new Calvary" was Claude R. Conder, a lieutenant in the Royal Engineers, who was appointed in 1872 by the Palestine Exploration Fund to conduct a mapping survey of Western Palestine. Conder was repulsed by the Church of the Holy Sepulchre, and especially by the annual "miracle of the Holy Fire", as believed in by Greek Orthodox, Armenian Apostolical and Coptic Christians.

There are those who would willingly look upon it as the real place of the Saviour's Tomb, but I confess that, for myself, having twice witnessed the annual orgy which disgraces its walls, the annual imposture which is countenanced by its priests, and the fierce emotions of sectarian hate and blind fanaticism which are called forth by the supposed miracle, and remembering the tale of blood connected with the history of the Church, I should be loth to think that the Sacred Tomb had been a witness for so many years of so much human ignorance, folly, and crime.

— Claude R. Conder, Tent Work in Palestine: A Record of Discovery and Adventure, Vol. I (London, 1878), p. 327

Based on topographical and textual considerations, Conder argued that it would be dangerous and unlikely, from a town-defense point of view, for the walls to have previously been east of the Church of the Holy Sepulchre, concluding that the Church would have been inside the city walls and thus not the authentic tomb of Christ. He instead proposed that the true Calvary was the "rounded knoll" above Jeremiah's Grotto (i.e. Skull Hill). He based this identification on several arguments; firstly, as the Gospel of John places Golgotha in the near vicinity of a garden and a tomb, Conder argued that Golgotha must be close to the necropolis found just north of Jerusalem, near the main road to Nablus, "among the olive-gardens and vineyards of Wady el-Joz". Secondly, Conder proposed that Calvary was the public place of execution and especially noted that Sephardic Jews had regarded the site next to Jeremiah's Grotto as traditionally being a place of stoning, which he saw as corroborative evidence that it was indeed Golgotha. He also pointed to a Christian tradition which associated that general area with the martyrdom of St. Stephen as additional evidence that it was a public place of execution during the New Testament era.

Conder downplayed the supposed resemblance to a skull which he viewed as immaterial, remarking: "I should not like to base an argument on so slight a resemblance". In his writings Conder refers to Skull Hill by the Arabic name El-Heidhemiyeh which he interpreted as "the rent", and which he proposed was a corruption of El-Heiremiyeh – "the place of Jeremiah". However, later research has shown that the name is actually a corruption of El-Adhamiyeh, named after a zawiya which according to Muslim tradition was founded by the celebrated Sufi saint Ibrahim ibn Adham. Charles Wilson spelled the name as El Edhemîyeh.

==== Proponents in the 1870s ====
Additionally, in the 1870s the site of Skull Hill was strongly promoted by several notable figures in Jerusalem, including the American consul to Jerusalem, Selah Merril, who was also a Congregationalist minister and a member of the American Palestine Exploration Society, the Protestant Bishop of Jerusalem Samuel Gobat, who presided over the joint bishopric for Anglicans, Lutherans and Calvinists in the Holy Land, as well as Conrad Schick, a prominent Jerusalem-based architect, city planner, and proto-archaeologist of Swiss origins who penned hundreds of articles for the Palestine Exploration Fund.

In 1879 the French scholar Ernest Renan, author of the influential and controversial Life of Jesus also considered this view as a possibility in one of the later editions of his book.

==== General Gordon ====
However, the most famous proponent of the view that Skull Hill is the biblical Golgotha was Major-General Charles Gordon, who visited Jerusalem in 1883. His name has become so entwined with Skull Hill that many contemporary news articles and guide books erroneously state that Gordon was the first to discover the site. In reality Gordon was very much influenced by the arguments of Conder and by his conversations and correspondence with Schick.

Gordon went beyond Howe and Conder to passionately propose additional arguments, which he himself confessed were "more fanciful" and imaginative. Gordon proposed a typological reading of Leviticus 1:11: "[The sheep for a burnt-offering] shall be slaughtered on the north side of the altar before the LORD". Gordon interpreted this verse to mean that Christ, the prototype, must also have been slain north of the "altar" (Skull Hill being north of Jerusalem and of the Temple Mount). This typological interpretation is obviously theological and not scientific in nature, which leads to a very skeptical mention by a prominent detractors of "Gordon's Calvary", the researcher and Army officer Charles W. Wilson. Gordon also commented on the appropriateness of the location in a letter he sent to his sister on January 17, 1883, his second day in Jerusalem:

I feel, for myself, convinced that the Hill near the Damascus Gate is Golgotha [...] From it, you can see the Temple, the Mount of Olives and the bulk of Jerusalem. His stretched out arms would, as it were, embrace it: "all day long have I stretched out my arms" [cf. Isaiah 65:2]. Close to it is the slaughter-house of Jerusalem; quite pools of blood are lying there. It is covered with tombs of Muslim; There are many rock-hewn caves; and gardens surround it. Now, the place of execution in our Lord's time must have been, and continued to be, an unclean place [...] so, to me, this hill is left bare ever since it was first used as a place of execution [...] It is very nice to see it so plain and simple, instead of having a huge church built on it.

— Charles George Gordon, Letters of General C. G. Gordon to his Sister M. A. Gordon(London: Macmillan 1888), pp. 289–290

=== Garden Tomb identified by Gordon as Jesus' tomb ===
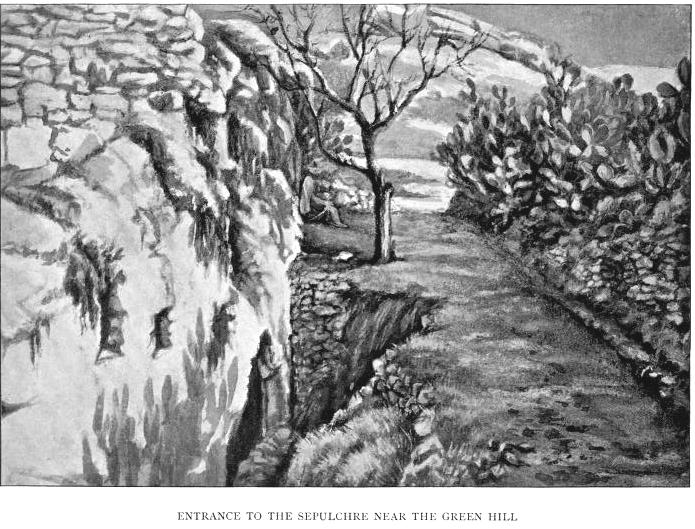
A sketch of the Garden Tomb created by B. H. Harris in 1889

The Church of the Holy Sepulchre has the tomb just a few yards away from Golgotha, corresponding with the account of the Gospel of John: "Now in the place where he was crucified there was a garden; and in the garden a new sepulchre, wherein was never man yet laid." In the latter half of the 19th century a number of tombs had also been found near Gordon's Golgotha, and Gordon concluded that one of them must have been the tomb of Jesus. The author of John also specifies that Jesus' tomb was located in a garden (John 19:41); consequently, an ancient wine press and cistern have been cited as evidence that the area had once been a garden, and the somewhat isolated tomb adjacent to the cistern has become identified as the Garden Tomb of Jesus. This particular tomb also has a stone groove running along the ground outside it, which Gordon argued to be a slot that once housed a stone, corresponding to the biblical account of a stone being rolled over the tomb entrance to close it.

Evangelicals and other Protestants consider the site to be the tomb of Jesus.

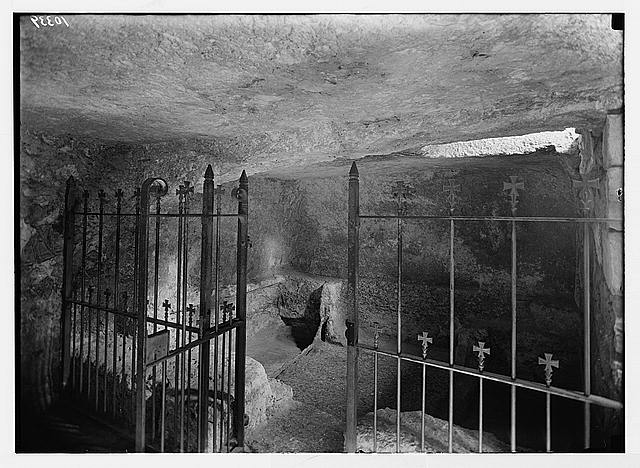
A view of the Garden Tomb from the 1930s

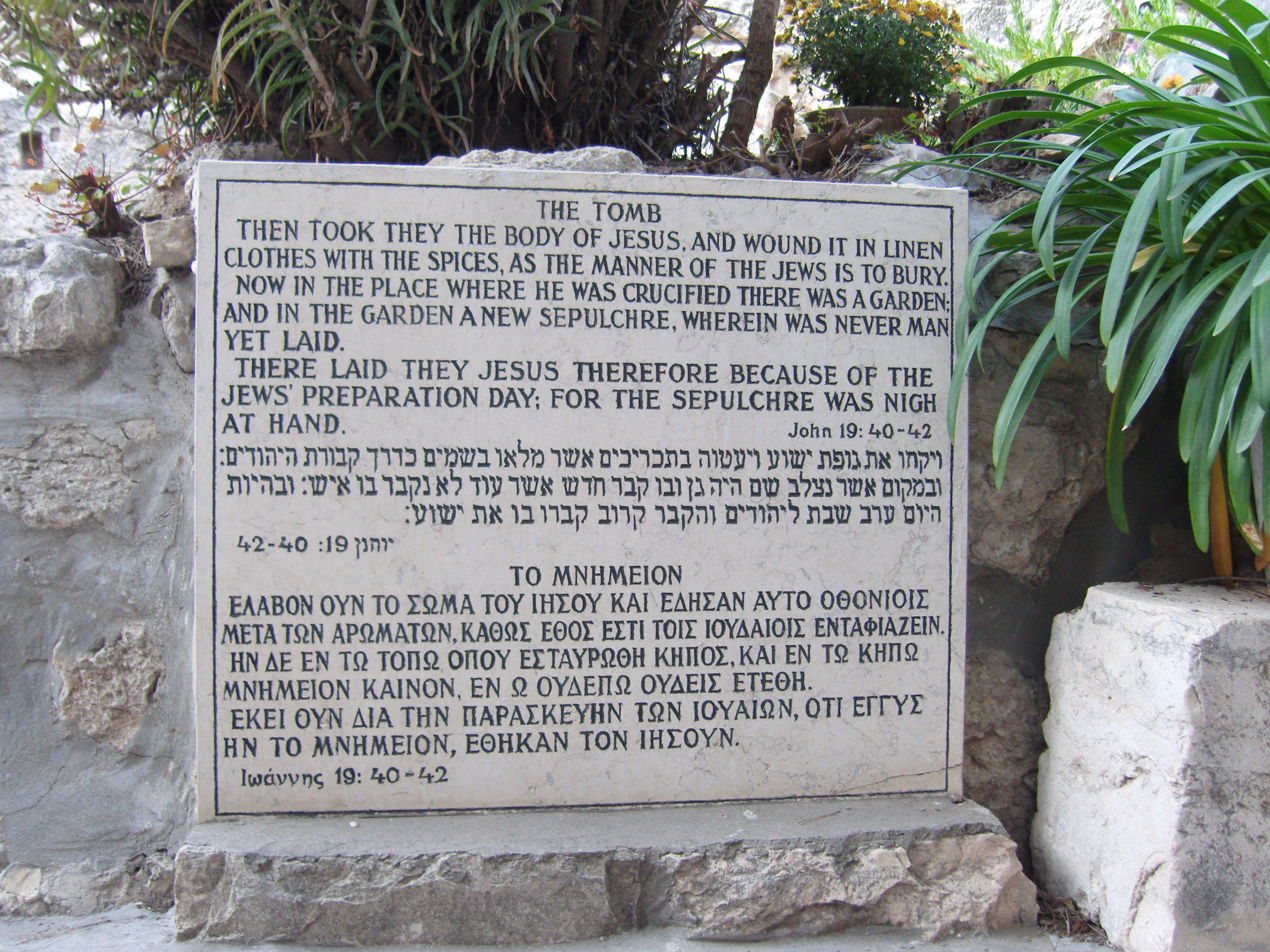
Panel near the tomb

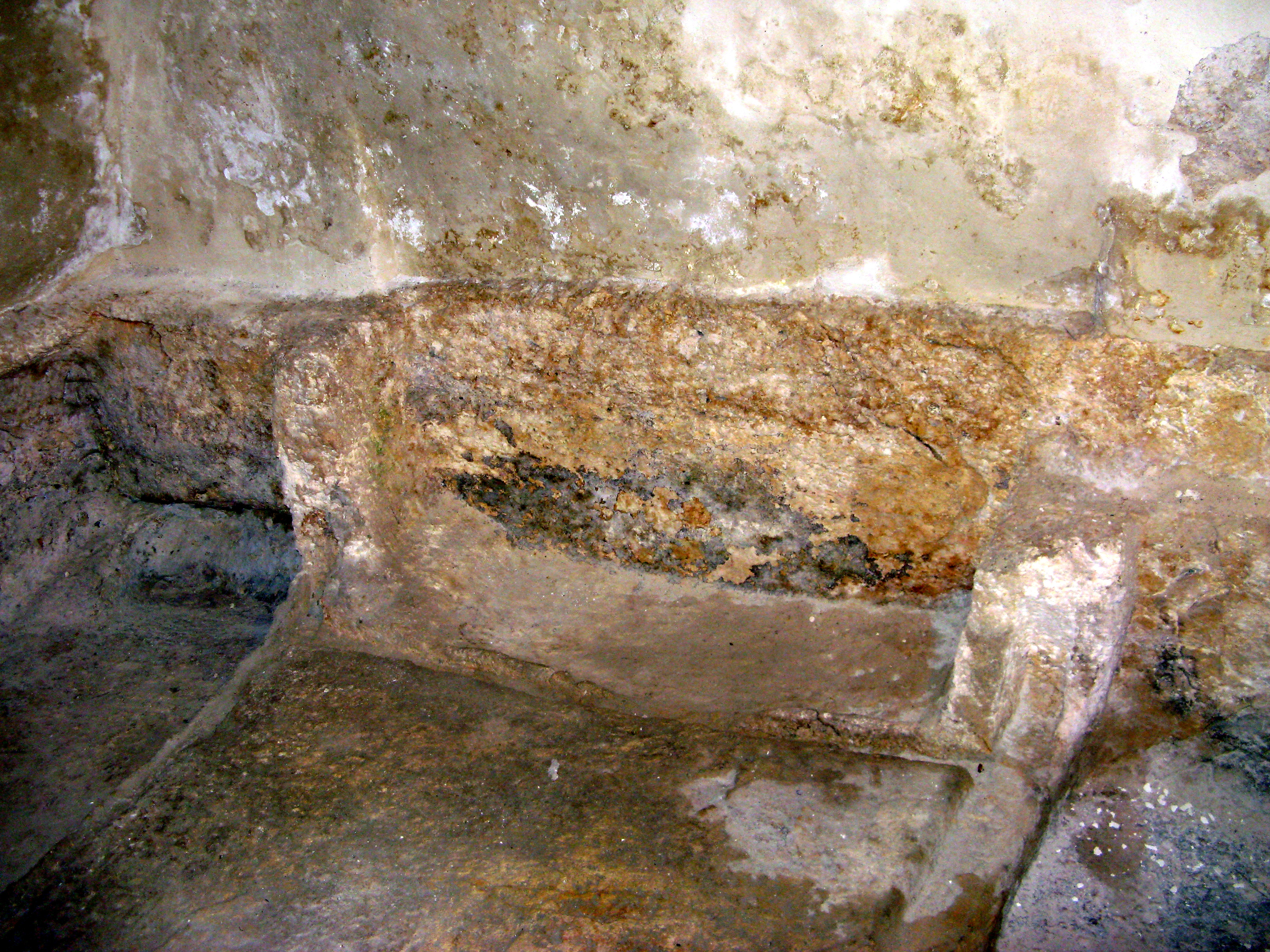
Inside the tomb

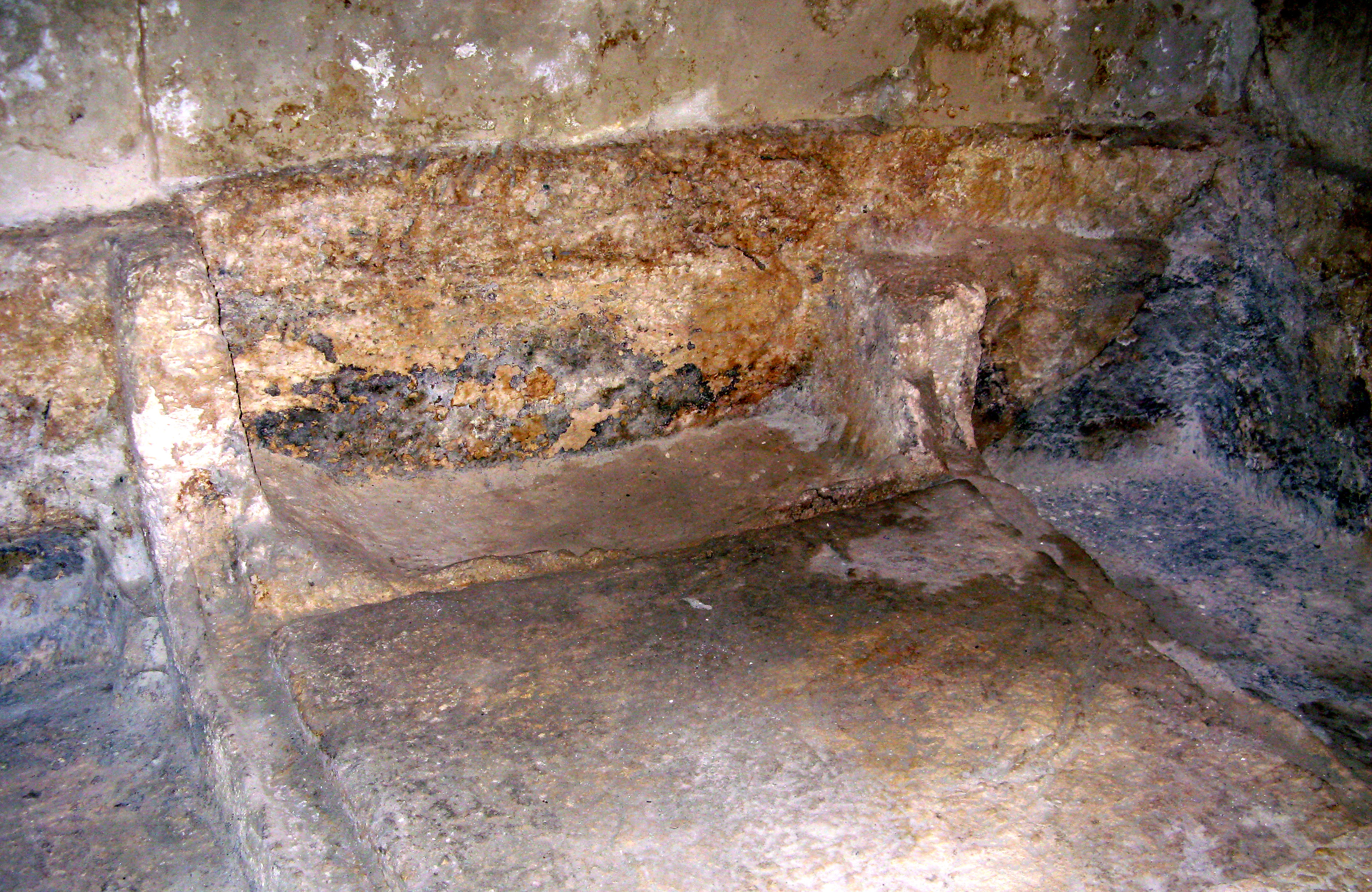
Inside the tomb

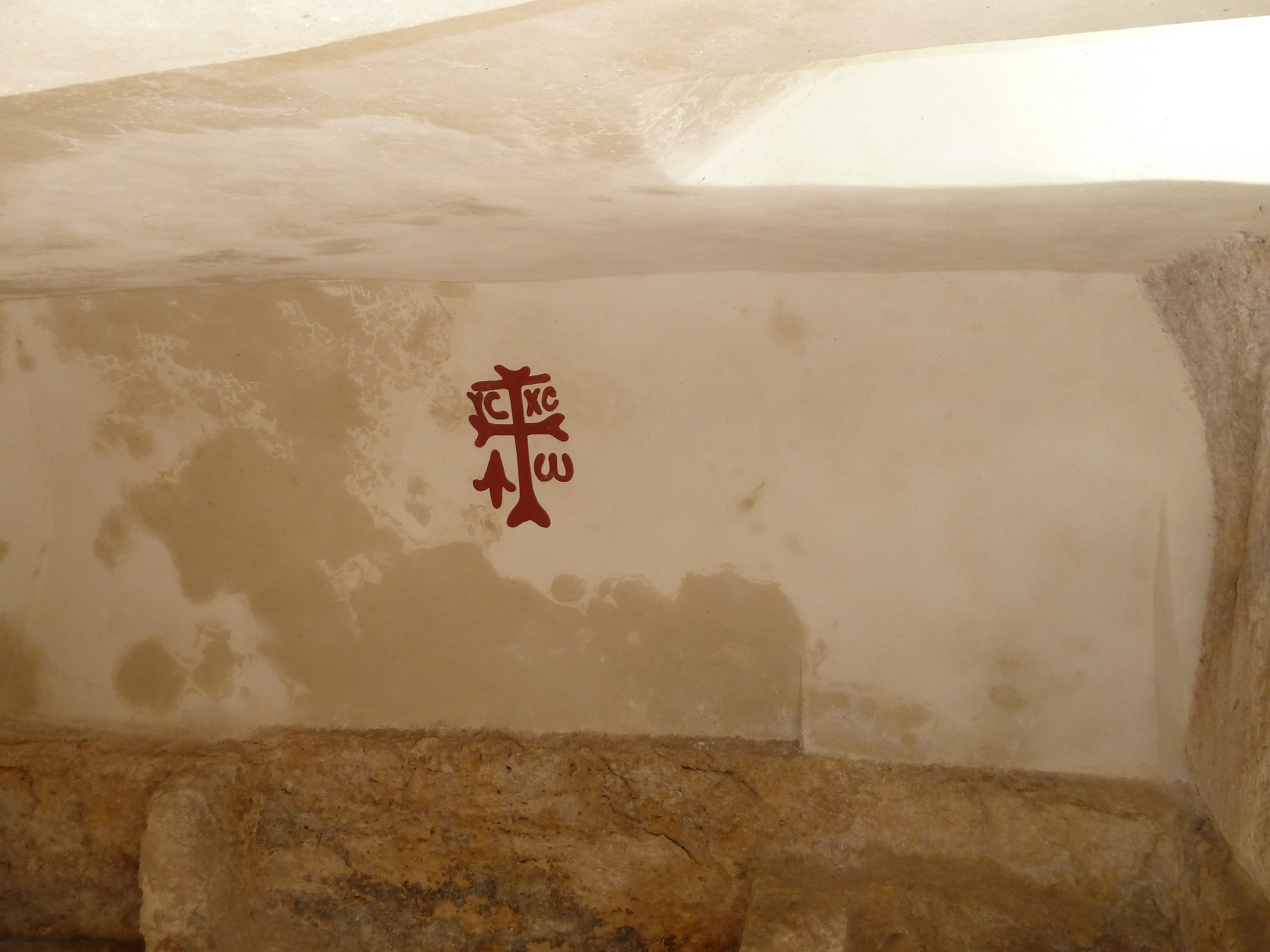
Inside the tomb

== Affiliation ==
The garden is administered by the Garden Tomb Association, a member of the Evangelical Alliance of Israel and the World Evangelical Alliance.

The Garden Tomb Association was founded in 1893 “for the preservation of the Tomb and Garden outside the walls of Jerusalem, believed to be the true Holy Sepulchre and Garden of Joseph of Arimathea” by a group of evangelical Anglicans from the Church of England that had come together since the year 1880. They were mostly composed of Anglican clergymen like Henry Baker Tristram, Maurice Day and Lewis Dibdin as well as the publisher John Murray. A driving force and main organizer was however Louisa A. C. Hope, who enlisted 52 women and 47 men as donors and supporters for the association's founding purchase and collected 400£ of the over 1000£ by herself.

After its founding, the new society began the purchase of the land of the Garden Tomb in 1894, thanks to their local contacts in Palestine. Among them were Charlotte Hussey and Caroline Hope, the sister of Louisa Hope. The Swiss banker-missionary Johannes Frutiger estimated the whole property that included the tomb to be worth around 3000£ worth. By purchasing the land and reselling the parts that the association was uninterested in, Frutiger facilitated the purchase of Garden Tomb for merely 1,869£; the deed to the property was then held by the missionary Charles T. Wilson, himself not a member of the association. Additional paperwork took until 1899 to finalize the purchase under Ottoman law.

Instead of building a church on the property, the Garden Tomb Association had intended from the start to keep the property a garden, and hired a caretaker and a watchman for the property. Charlotte Hussey moved her permanent residence to Palestine in 1895 and would then oversee the Garden Tomb. In 1923, she made archaelogical discoveries in the grounds; she left Jerusalem at a later point.

== Archaeological investigation and critical analysis ==
=== Golgotha ===
==== In the church ====
In the 20th century, archaeological findings enhanced the discussion concerning the authenticity of the traditional site at the Church of the Holy Sepulchre:

- Prior to Constantine's time (r. 306–337), the site was a temple to Venus, built by Hadrian some time after 130.
  - Archaeology suggests that the traditional tomb would have been within Hadrian's temple, or likely to have been destroyed under the temple's heavy retaining wall.
  - The temple's location complies with the typical layout of Roman cities (i.e. adjacent to the forum, at the intersection of the main north-south road with the main east-west road), rather than necessarily being a deliberate act of contempt for Christianity, as claimed in the past.
- A spur would be required for the rockface to have included both the alleged site of the tomb and the tombs beyond the western end of the church.
- The tombs west of the traditional site are dated to the first century, indicating that the site was outside the city at that time.

==== Knoll next to Garden Tomb ====
Besides the skull-like appearance (a modern-day argument), there are a few other details put forward in favour of the identification of Skull Hill as Golgotha. The location of the site would have made executions carried out there a highly visible sight to people using the main road leading north from the city; the presence of the skull-featured knoll in the background would have added to the deterrent effect.

==== Ancient views ====
Eusebius (260s – c. 340) comments that Golgotha was in his day pointed out "north of Mount Zion". Both the Garden Tomb's Golgotha and the Church of the Holy Sepulcher are north of the hill currently referred to as Mount Zion. Although in the Hebrew Bible the term Mount Zion referred to the Temple Mount or the spur south of it, which both lay east of Jerusalem's Central Valley. Mount Zion had been identified as Jerusalem's western hill, both by Josephus in the first century CE, and in the Byzantine period by Christian sources. Josephus did not use the name Mount Zion in his writing, but identified it by describing what was incorrectly believed to have been the location of the "Citadel" of King David in his time.

==== Christian traditions ====
An extra-biblical Christian legend maintains that Golgotha (lit. "the skull") is Adam's burial site, while Talmudic-period Judaism held that Adam is buried in the cave of Machpelah in Hebron, and the name Golgotha is absent from Talmudic literature. The 1906 Jewish Encyclopedia states that the Talmudic-period rabbis created the concept that "Adam was created from the dust of the place where the sanctuary was to rise for the atonement of all human sin", i.e. the Jerusalem Temple's Holy of Holies, so that sin should not constitute a constant or characteristic attribute of human nature; Christians adapted this thought and relocated Adam's grave to what they considered to be the new place of atonement, Jesus' crucifixion site at Golgotha.

=== The Garden Tomb ===
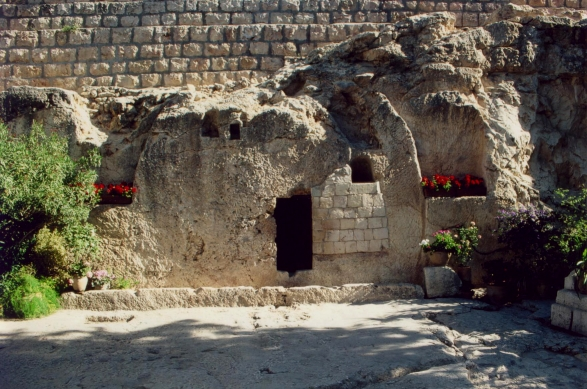
The Garden Tomb in 2008

The earliest detailed investigation of the tomb itself was a brief report prepared in 1874 by Conrad Schick, a German architect, archaeologist and Protestant missionary, but the fullest archaeological study of the area has been the seminal investigation by Gabriel Barkay, professor of Biblical archaeology at the Hebrew University of Jerusalem and at Bar-Ilan University, during the late twentieth century.

The tomb has two chambers, the second to the right of the first, with stone benches along the back wall of the first chamber, and along the sides of each wall in the second chamber, except the wall joining it to the first chamber; the benches have been heavily damaged but are still discernible. The edge of the groove outside the tomb has a diagonal edge, which would be unable to hold a stone slab in place (the slab would just fall out); additionally, known tombs of the rolling-stone type use vertical walls on either side of the entrance to hold the stone, not a groove on the ground.

Barkay concluded that:

- The tomb is far too old to be the tomb of Jesus, as it is typical of the 8th–7th centuries BCE, showing a configuration which fell out of use after that period. It fits well into a wider necropolis dating to the First Temple period which also includes the nearby tombs on the grounds of the Basilica of St Stephen.
- The groove was a water trough, built by the 11th-century Crusaders for donkeys/mules.
- The cistern was built as part of the same stable complex as the groove.
- The waterproofing on the cistern is of the type used by the Crusaders, and the cistern must date to that era.

In 1986, Barkay criticized defenders of the location of the garden and the Church of the Holy Sepulchre for making more theological and apologetic than scientific arguments.

In 2010, the director of the garden, Richard Meryon, claimed in an interview with The Jerusalem Post that each camp had academic and archaeological evidence in favor of the actual location, and that only one of the two could be right, but that the important thing was the symbolism of the place and especially the history of Jesus and not a guarantee of the exact site. In the same interview, Steve Bridge, a retired pastor volunteering in the garden, claimed that Catholic groups came to the site regularly, and that the guides did not play politics, with the emphasis on the crucifixion and the resurrection of Jesus.

In 2005 an Iron Age II cylinder seal was excavated, thought to be debris from nearby tombs.

== Reception by Christian denominations ==
Due to the archaeological issues the Garden Tomb site raises, several scholars have rejected its claim to be Jesus' tomb. Author and explorer Paul Backholer concludes the emphasis on feelings in evangelical circles, has encouraged many to ‘feel’ the Garden Tomb is the location, despite evidence to the contrary. However, despite the archaeological discoveries, the Garden Tomb has become a popular place of pilgrimage among Protestants including, Anglicans. As such, St. George's Anglican Cathedral was built 180 metres (200 yards) away from the Garden Tomb.

The Garden Tomb has been the most favoured candidate site among leaders of the Church of Jesus Christ of Latter-day Saints.

Major Christian denominations, including the Roman Catholic, Evangelical-Lutheran, and Eastern Orthodox Churches, do not accept the Garden Tomb as being the tomb of Jesus and hold fast to the traditional location at the Church of the Holy Sepulchre. Directly adjacent to the Church of the Holy Sepulchre is the Church of the Redeemer, marking a Lutheran presence at the site.

The British author, barrister and civil servant, Arthur William Crawley Boevey (1845–1913) produced for the Committee of the Garden Tomb Maintenance Fund in Jerusalem an introduction and guidebook to the site in 1894. The booklet has subsequently been revised and enlarged on several occasions, including by Mabel Bent in the early 1920s.

== See also ==
- Zedekiah's Cave, part of the same ancient quarries

== Bibliography ==
- Bahat, Dan. "Does the Holy Sepulchre Church Mark the Burial of Jesus?". Biblical Archaeology Review (May/June 1986). BAS.
- Barkay, Gabriel (24 August 2015). "The Garden Tomb". Biblical Archaeology Review (March/April 1986). BAS.
- Kochav, Sarah (April 1995). "The Search for a Protestant Holy Sepulchre: The Garden Tomb in Nineteenth-Century Jerusalem". The Journal of Ecclesiastical History. 46 (2). Cambridge University Press: 278–301. doi:10.1017/S0022046900011374. S2CID 162859328.
- Kochav, Sarah (1999). Church of the Holy Sepulchre. Holy Land Revealed guides. Ben-Zvi Institute. p. 29. ISBN 9789652171634. "The Garden Tomb Society, supported by many prominent Evangelicals in the Church of England was formed to purchase the tomb and the surrounding land in 1885." Access to cited text currently not allowed (August 2021).
- Schaff, Philip (1878). Through Bible Lands: Notes of Travel in Egypt, the Desert, and Palestine. New York: American Tract Society. pp. 268–269. ISBN 9780790503257.
- Wilson, Charles W. (1906). "Chapter X: Theories with Regard to the Position of Golgotha and the Tomb". Golgotha and The Holy Sepulchre. London: The Committee of the Palestine Exploration Fund. pp. 103–120. Good text scan, but with blurred illustrations and captions; or here, a darker scan, but with fully visible illustrations.
