= Mabel Bent =

Anglo-Irish explorer, writer and photographer

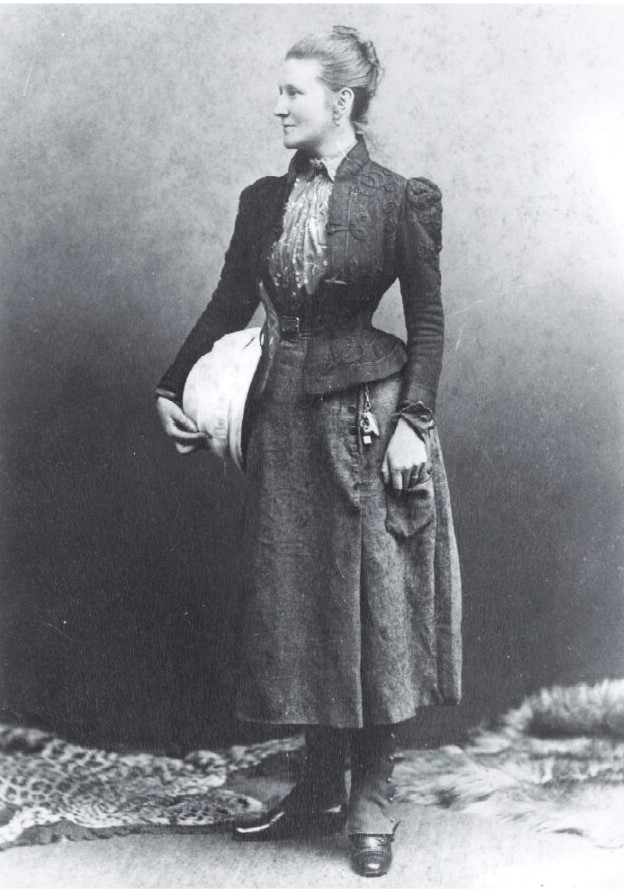
- Bent in 1891
- Born: Mabel Virginia Anna Hall-Dare; 28 January 1847; County Meath, Ireland
- Died: 3 July 1929 (aged 82); London, England
- Occupations: Explorer; excavator; writer; photographer
- Spouse: James Theodore Bent (m. 1877; died 1897)

Mabel Virginia Anna Bent (née Hall-Dare, a.k.a. Mrs James Theodore Bent) (28 January 1847 – 3 July 1929), was an Anglo-Irish explorer, excavator, writer and photographer. With her husband, James Theodore Bent, she spent two decades (1877–1897) travelling, collecting and researching in remote regions of the Eastern Mediterranean, Asia Minor, Africa, and Arabia.

== Early life ==
Hall-Dare was born on 28 January 1847. Her birthplace was her grandfather's estate, Beauparc, on the River Boyne in County Meath, Ireland. Via her mother, Frances Anna Catherine Lambart, she descends from Oliver Lambart, 1st Lord Lambart, Baron of Cavan (died June 1618), English MP for Southampton (1597), Governor of Connaught (1601), Irish Privy Counsellor (1603). He is buried in Westminster Abbey. Shortly after her birth the Hall-Dares moved to Temple House, County Sligo, before re-locating in the early 1860s to County Wexford, acquiring the property that was later to become Newtownbarry House, in Newtownbarry (now the village of Bunclody). While young, Hall-Dare suffered several bereavements, losing both her parents and her two brothers.

Hall-Dare and her sisters received education at home with private governesses and tutors.

Distant cousins (via the Lambarts), and having met in Norway, Hall-Dare married J. Theodore Bent on 2 August 1877 in the church of Staplestown, County Carlow, not far from Mabel's Irish home. There was wealth on both sides, and the Bents set up home first at 43 Great Cumberland Place, near Marble Arch, in London, later moving closer to the Arch at number 13; Mabel remained in that same rented townhouse for 30 years after Theodore's death in 1897, until her own death in 1929.

== Bent's Journeys 1877–1897 ==
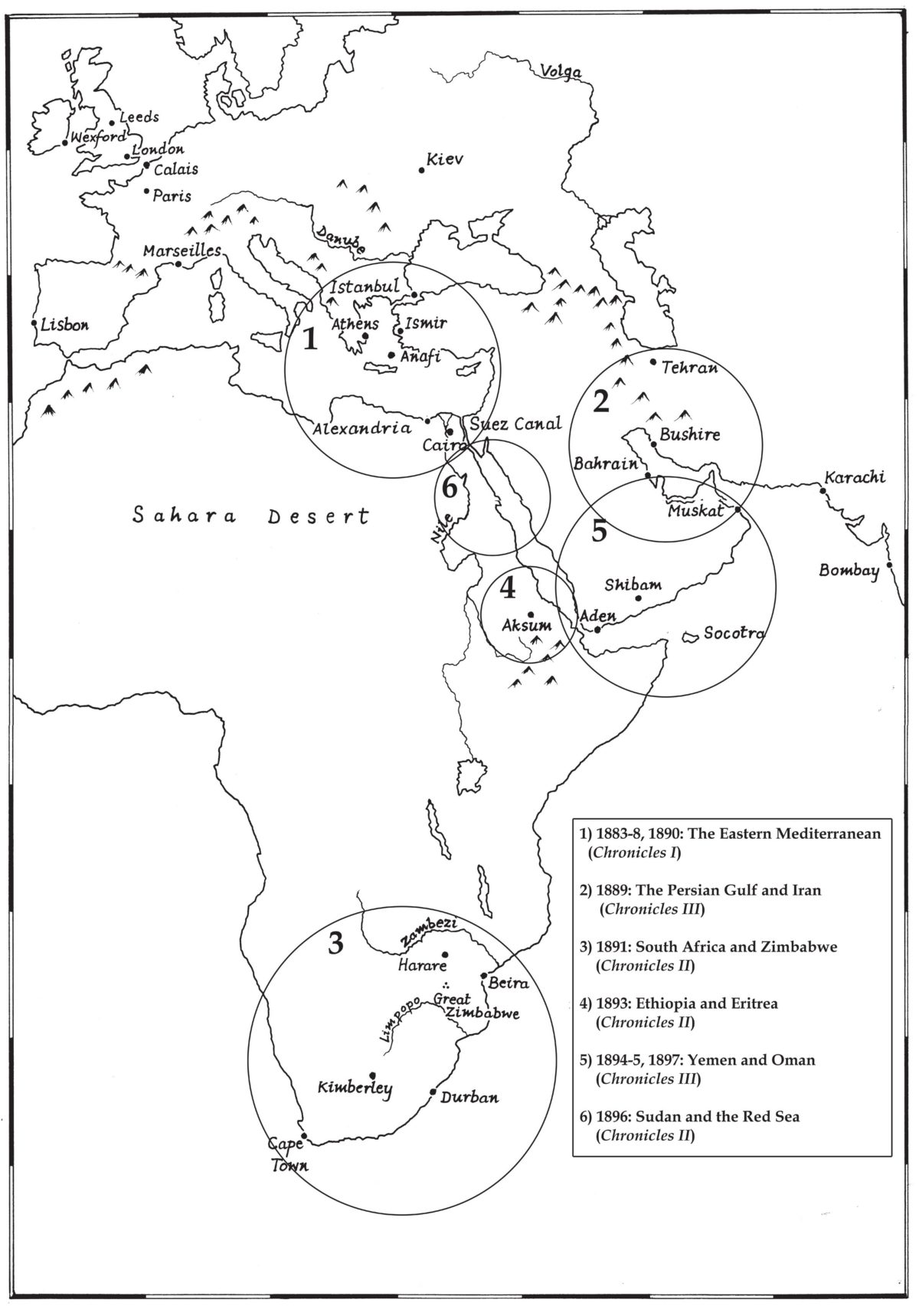
The expeditions of Theodore & Mabel Bent, 1883-1897

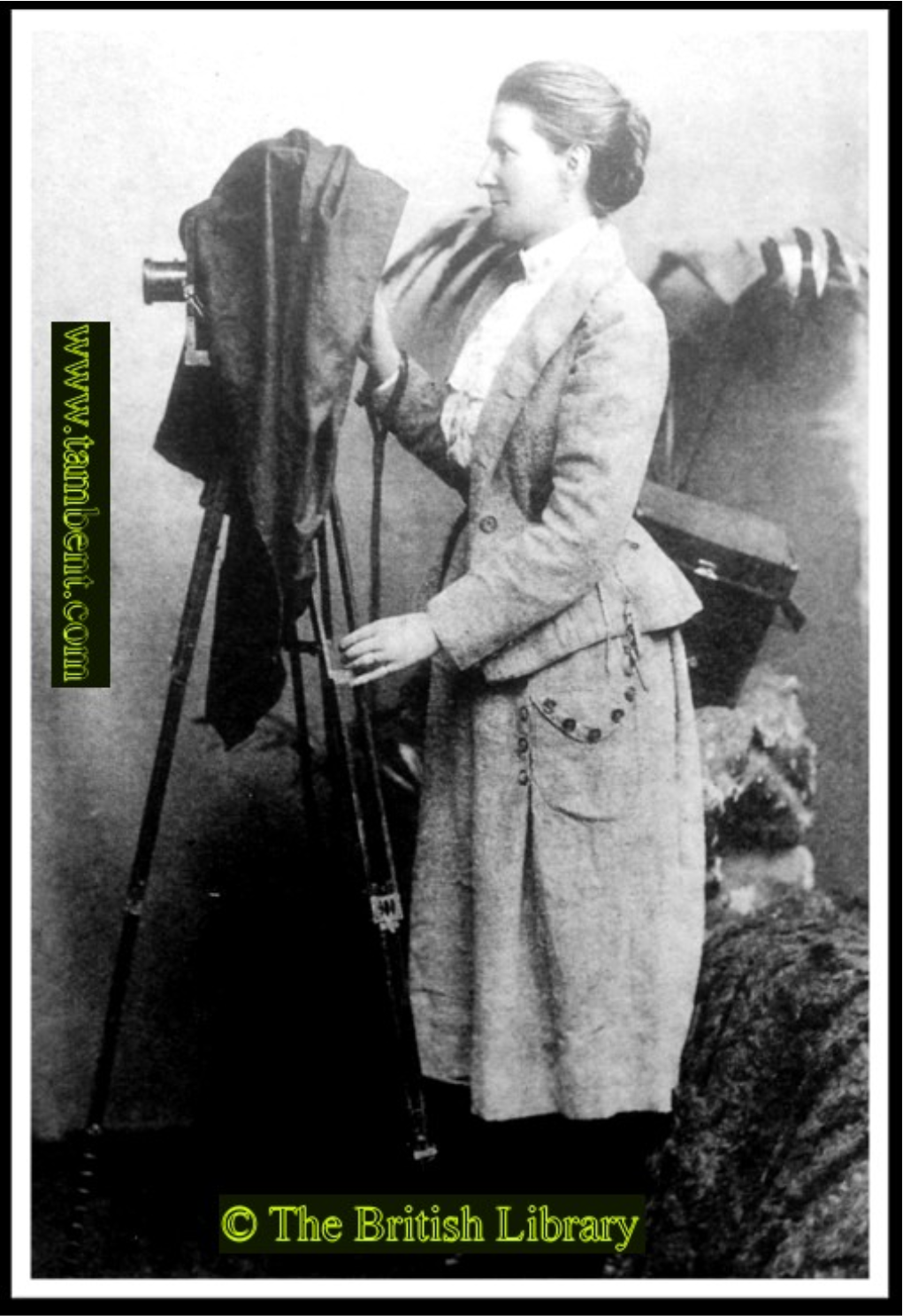
Mrs. Bent and her camera, pre-1895

Mabel and Theodore Bent’s first journeys took them to Italy at the end of the 1870s, Theodore, who history at Oxford University, being interested in Garibaldi and Italian unification. From there, Theodore decided to pursue a career as a historian and amateur archaeologist. For the next twenty-seven years, the couple would embark on annual travels across the Mediterranean, Africa, and Arabia.

The Bents chose to spend the winter and spring months of every year traveling, using summers and autumns to write up their findings and prepare for their next campaigns. Their main geographical fields of interest can be roughly grouped into three primary areas: Greece and the Eastern Mediterranean (the 1880s); Africa (the early 1890s); and Southern Arabia (the mid 1890s).

Mabel documented her travels with a series of diaries or ‘Chronicles’. These contained her travel notes, findings, and observations. Her husband used her notebooks as aides memoires in his own writings. Her collection of notebooks is now in the archives of the Hellenic and Roman Library, Senate House, London. Several of her letters home from Africa and Arabia are held in the Royal Geographical Society in London.

Starting in 1885, Bent travelled with her photographic equipment and, from then on, became expedition photographer. She often travelled with a large quantity of equipment, including two to three cameras, chemicals, glass plates, film, and a portable darkroom. Few of her original photographs have survived, but many were used to produce the illustrations that feature in her husband's books and articles, and the lantern slides that enhanced his lectures at the Royal Geographical Society in London and elsewhere.

=== The Greek and Eastern Mediterranean Travels ===
- 1882-1883: The Greek Mainland
- 1883-1884: The Cyclades
- 1885: The Greek Dodecanese
- 1886: Istanbul and along the Turkish Coast
- 1887: Thásos and Northern Aegean
- 1888: Asia Minor Littoral

==== Greek Mainland ====
In the Winter of 1882-1883, the Bents explored the archeological sites of Tiryans, Mycenae, and Delphi. On their way home, they stopped at the Cycladic islands of Tinos and Amorgos to witness the Easter celebrations, leading the pair to embark on more in depth expeditions to the region in the Spring of 1884.

==== The Cyclades ====
On the Cycladic island of Antiparos in early 1884, the Bents were shown some prehistoric graves by local mining engineers, Robert and John Swan. Theodore Bent undertook amateur archaeological investigations at two sites on the island and returned to London with skeletal remnants which are now in the Natural History Museum, and many ceramic, stone and obsidian finds that now form a significant part of the British Museum's Cycladic collection; within a few months he had published the material and his career as an archaeologist/ethnographer, and in which his wife was to be central, was launched. These expeditions culminated in Theodore’s most popular work, (1885) The Cyclades, or Life Among the Insular Greeks.

It was during this trip that Mabel Bent began her 'Chronicles'.

==== The Greek Dodecanese ====
In 1885, the Bents explored the islands currently known as the Greek Dodescanese. In 1885, the region belonged to the Ottoman Empire. Their main internist was Kárpathos, where the Bents acquired a Limestone statue which is housed in the British Museum. They also stopped at Rhodes, Nisyros, and Tilos, searching for antiquities, textiles, and ceramics.

It is within this chronicle that Mabel first references her role as expedition photographer, which she continued to hold throughout all the Bents’ expeditions. Mabel was particularly interested in the traditions and customs of the Dodecanese, which she captured with her photography and writings.

==== Istanbul and the Turkish Coast ====
Using a grant from the Hellenic Society, the Bents led a journey down the Turkish island of Sámos and Chíos. However, in Sámos, they encountered some problems with the local authorities, due to not having permission to dig in the island. Mabel mentioned in her diaries about the schemes the crew employed to avoid local “pirates” along the Turkish coast. The Bents were accompanied by their dragoman Manthaios Símos from the Cycladic island of Anafi. He was invited on most of their journeys until their final one in 1897.

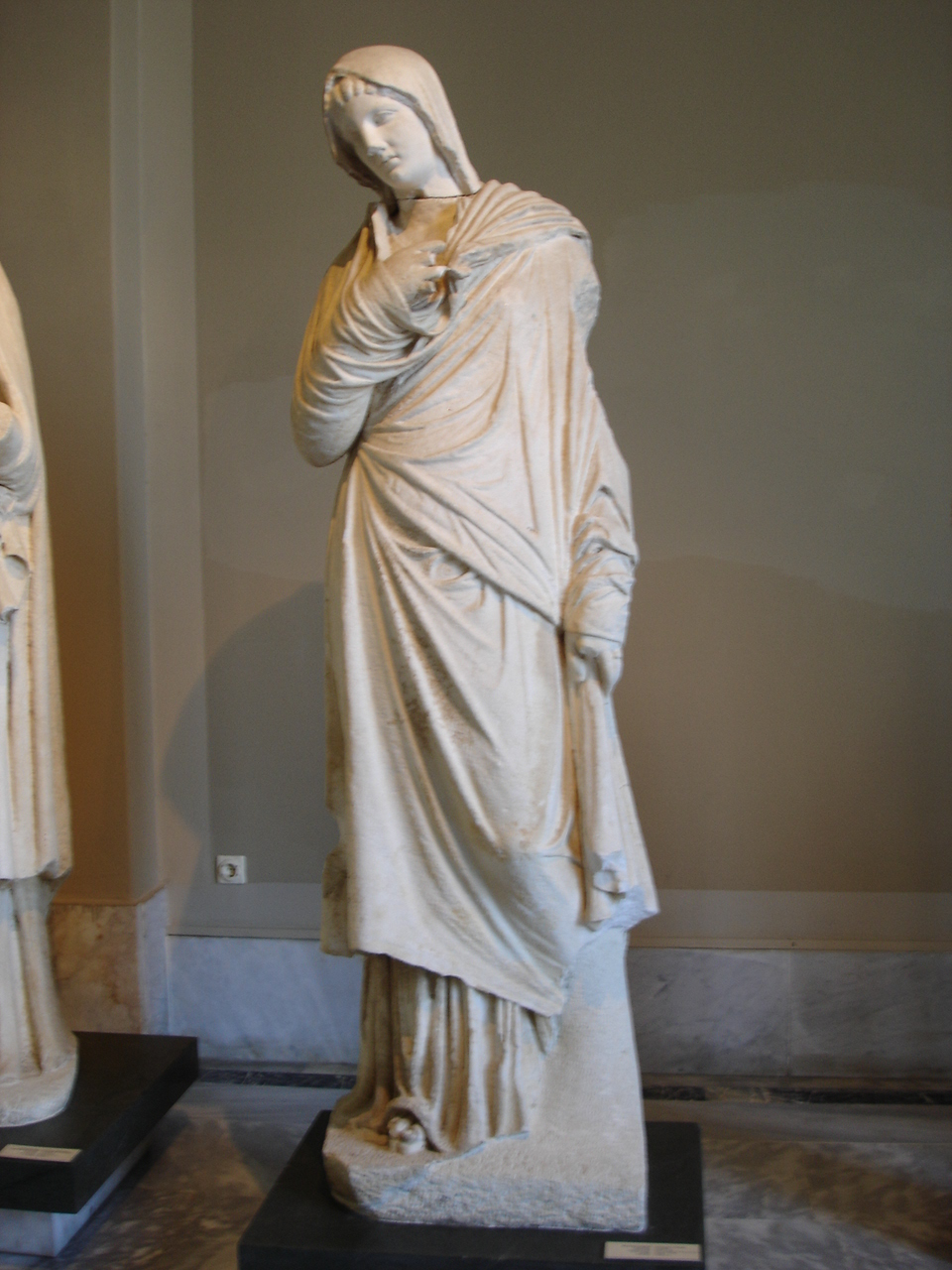
The statue of Vibia Sabina that Bent uncovered in Thásos (Istanbul Archaeological Museum)

The Bents travelled across the Northern Aegean in 1887, working their way up the Turkish coast. They stopped along Metéora, Vólos, and Thessaloníki before reaching their intended destination of Thásos. Theodore’s main discoveries centered on the remains of the Arch of Caracalla. The Bents also evacuated a number of marble statues. It was also on this island that Mabel acquired her pet tortoise, ‘Thraki’.

The marble items from Thásos were taken to an archaeological museum in Istanbul, despite the Bents’ efforts. The couple in turn spent much of the summer and autumn of 1887 trying to build support to “rescue” the artifacts from the Ottoman authorities and bring them to London. In 1888, the Director of Antiquities in Turkey, Hamdi Bey, restricted the Bents from further expedition on Turkish lands.

Despite Ottoman restrictions, in 1888, the Bents led an expedition along the Asia Minor littoral, going as far as Kastellórizo. Mabel wrote in her diary, “Everyone says it is better to dig first and let them say Kismet after, than to ask leave of the Turks and have them spying there”. The Hellenic society funded the Bents evacuations of sites in ancient Loryma, Lydae, and Myra. Thedore entitled his article on this journey, ‘A Piratical F.S.A.”.

=== The African Journeys ===
- January 1885 - February 1885: Cairo, Egypt
- January 1891 - March 1892: ‘Mashonaland’ (modern Zimbabwe) on behalf of Cecil Rhodes to explore the site of Great Zimbabwe
- January 1893- March 1893: Ethiopia (Askum)
- December 1895 - April 1896: Sudan

==== Zimbabwe ====
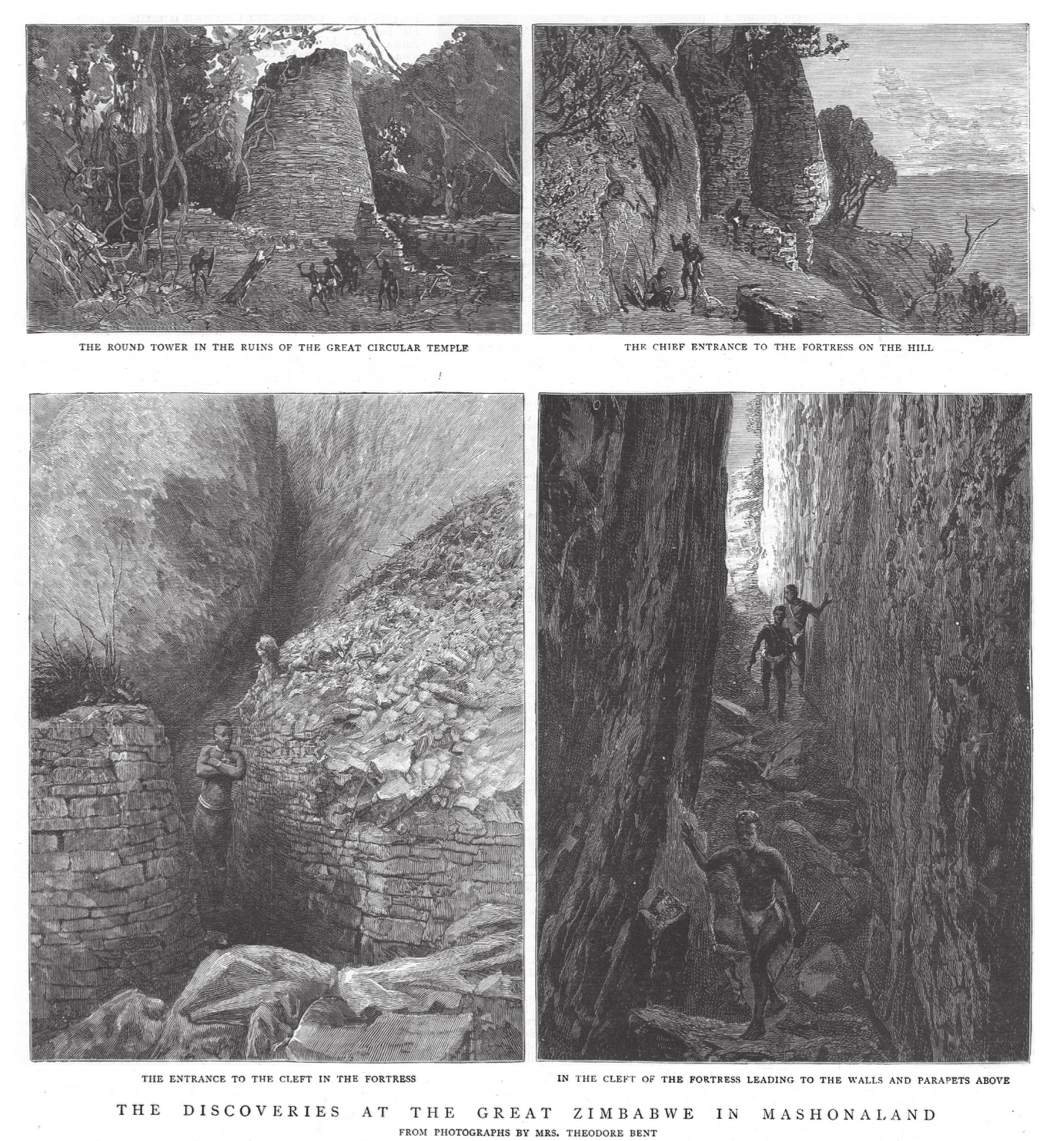
Four scenes from Great Zimbabwe, based on Mabel’s photographs (photo: The Bent Archive)

In 1891, Mabel Bent accompanied Theodore on an excavation he led on the ruins of Mashonaland. The expedition was funded by the Royal Geographical Society (RSG), the British South Africa Company, and the British Association of Science. Cecil Rhodes, founder of the BSAC, chose Bent because of his prior archaeological work on the Phoenicians. Rhodes had plans to develop a British colony in Zimbabwe and evidence of the "foreign origin” of Great Zimbabwe’ would justify European colonization of the region.

Theodore supported the theories of Cecil Rhodes, claiming “that the ruins and the things in them are not in any way connected with any known African race”. Theodore originally concluded that the ruins were of Persian origin, but later changed his theory claiming that the former civilization was in fact related to the Phoenicians. Bent theorized that the builders of the ruins came from the Arabian Peninsula. He further theorized this prehistoric race was then absorbed into the Phoenician and Egyptian races.

Theodores’s resulting book, “The Ruined Cities of Mashonaland,” was one of his most popular. The book included many illustrations derived from Mabel’s photography.

==== Ethiopia ====
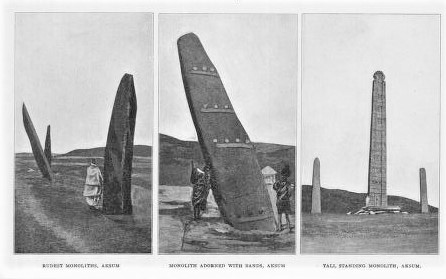
Mabel’s own photos of some of the monoliths of Aksum, 1893

In January of 1893, the Bents travelled to the ancient capital of the Abyssinian empire, Aksum. Theodore sought to support his Great Zimbabwe findings by identifying archaeological similarities between the interior of Ethiopia and the ruins of Mashonaland. The expedition was funded by the British Museum, the RGS, and the British Association of Science. Theodore published their findings in The Sacred City of the Ethiopians. Many reviews praised Mabel’s photographs of the ruins, especially those of the monument of Axum.

==== Sudan ====
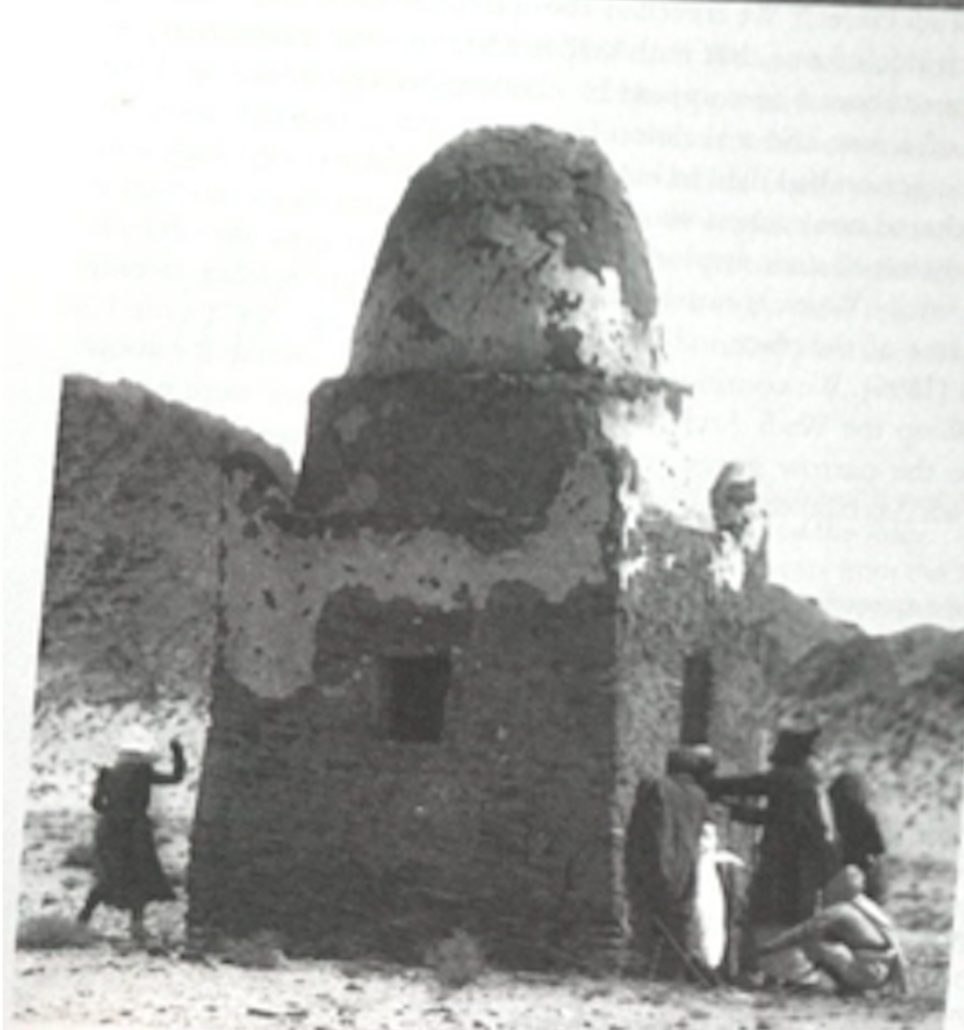
Mabel Bent pictured at a tower near Mohammad Gul, Sudan

In December of 1885, after political instability postponed the Bents’ tour of Hadhramout. The Bents embarked on an impromptu expedition along the west coast of the Red Sea. Their boat tour led the Bents’ to set their eyes on the Sudanese interior. However, The Bents were restricted by British officials in occupied Egypt from entering the interior of Sudan due to the rise of the nationalist Mahdist Sudan. The Bents deliberately disobeyed orders and ventured inland.

The Bents’ observations of gold-mining activity in the Sudanese interior of Wadi Gabeit attracted much media attention. Theodore presented his findings to the Royal Geography Society in June of 1896, but the archeological items he collected were the leanest from any of his travels. Mabel incorporated her Chronicles on Sudan into her book, Southern Arabia (1900) in a popular chapter entitled “African Interlude, "The Eastern Soudan”.

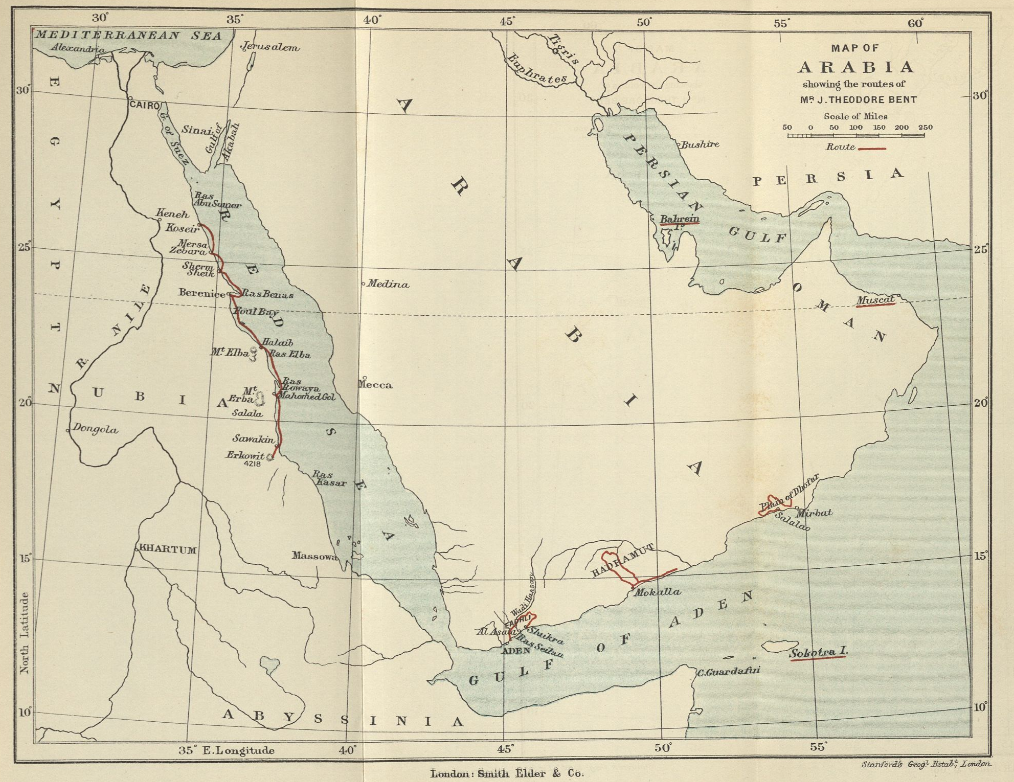
Map of Arabia Showing the Routes of Mr. J. Theodore Bent

=== The Arabian Journeys ===
- December 1888 - 1889: Bahrain, to excavate the Dilmun Burial Mounds, via India and, south-north, the length of Iran on horseback
- 1890: Along the Turkish coast and into Armenia
- December 1894 - March 1895: Yemen (Wadi Hadramaut)
- November 1894 - April 1895: Muscat, Oman and Dhofar, during which they identify the remains at Khor Rori
- November 1896 - April 1897: Socotra and Yemen

==== Bahrain ====
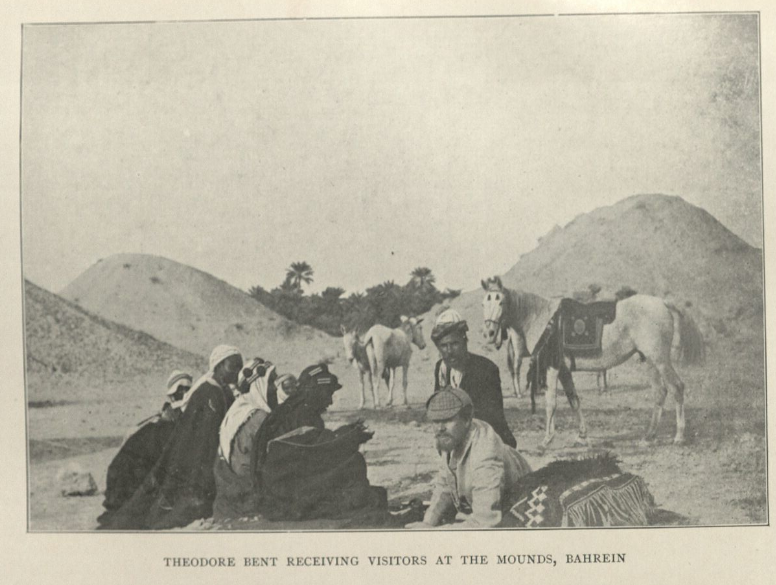
Theodore Bent Receiving Visitors at the Mounds, Bahrien

The Bents travelled to the island of Bahrain in December 1888, to investigate and excavate burial mounds. Theodore theorized that the site was Phoenician based on classical sources, and he and Bent believed the objects they unearthed confirmed the theory. They found pottery, utensils, and some faunal remains, which they believed were horse bones, although one of the mounds they attempted to investigate caved in when they opened it. Their findings from this excavation are now in the British Museum. The Bents travelled with a portable dark room and Mabel records taking a number of photographs during the expedition.

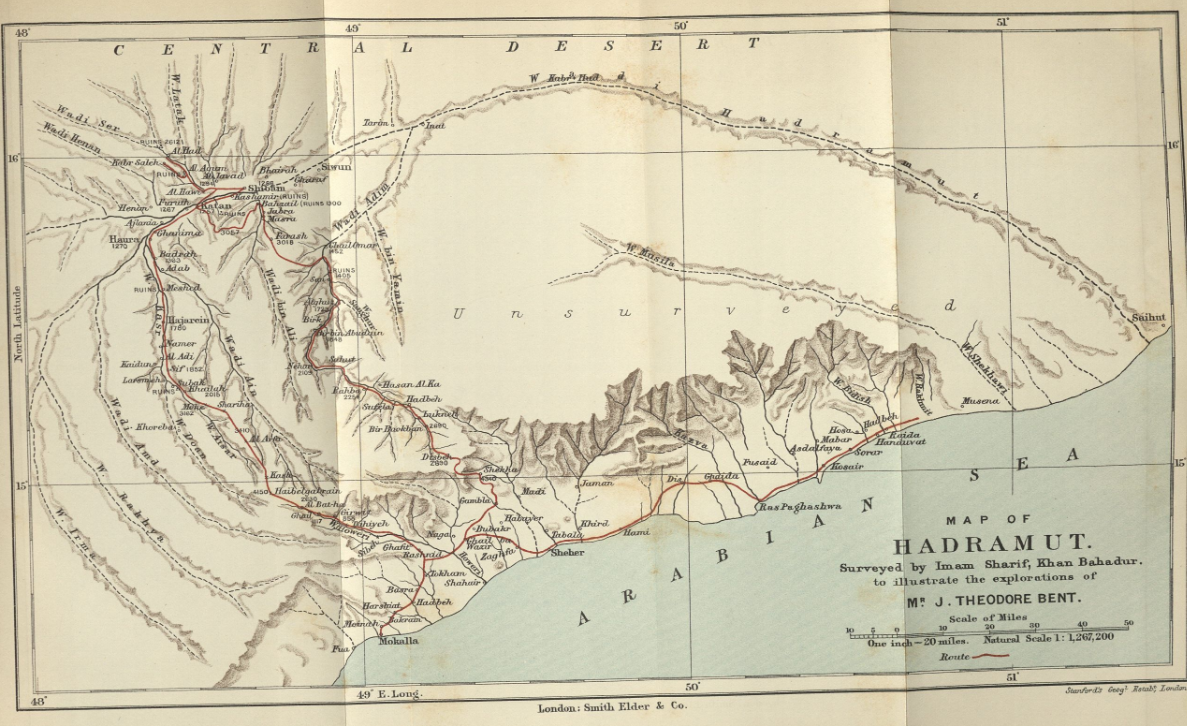
Map of the Bents' route in the Hadramut

==== The Hadhramout ====
In December 1893, Mabel and Theodore travelled to Hadramaut in Yemen, making them the only documented Europeans to have ventured so far inland at the time. Their party was larger than in their previous expeditions and included English botanist William Lunt, Egyptian naturalist Mahmoud Bayoumi, and Indian cartographer Imam Sharif. After difficulties with their translator, Theodore ended the exhibition early, returning to London with less material than planned, although Mabel praises Imam Sharif’s map in Southern Arabia.

The extended journeys made by the Bents in remote places called for them to carry with them adequate medical supplies. Mabel Bent tried to alleviate where possible ailments presented by the people they travelled among, for example in the Wadi Khonab (Hadramaut, Yemen) in January 1894, as recorded in her diary: 'Among the patients was brought a baby… such an awful object of thinness and sores… No cure had we, and though we did consult over ¼ drop of chlorodine, in much water, we felt it was really dangerous to meddle with the poor thing… Theodore told them it could not live long and it died that evening or next day.'

The Bethel Seal: Some writers think that Bent may have been involved in an archaeological puzzle known as the 'Bethel Seal' controversy. Some 15 km north of Jerusalem, in the village of Bethel (modern Beytin/Baytin/Beitin), a small clay stamp/seal was found in 1957 that looked identical to one obtained by Theodore Bent on their trip into the Wadi Hadramaut (Yemen) in 1894. Some researchers have suggested that Bent had deposited the artefact in archaeological remains in Bethel as a token to her husband, to bolster his theories about early trade links in the wider region, at a time when Theodore Bent's findings were being criticized and his academic reputation questioned, especially his interpretation of the Great Zimbabwe monuments.

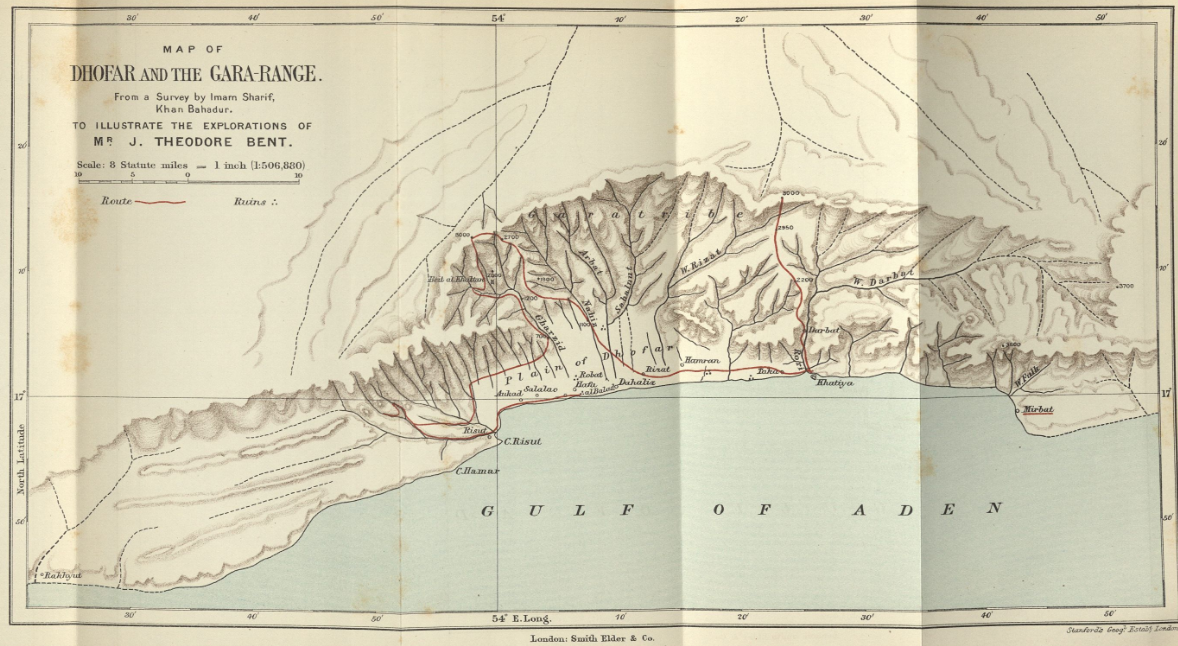
Map of Dhofar and the Gara-Range showing the Bents' routes

==== Dhofar ====
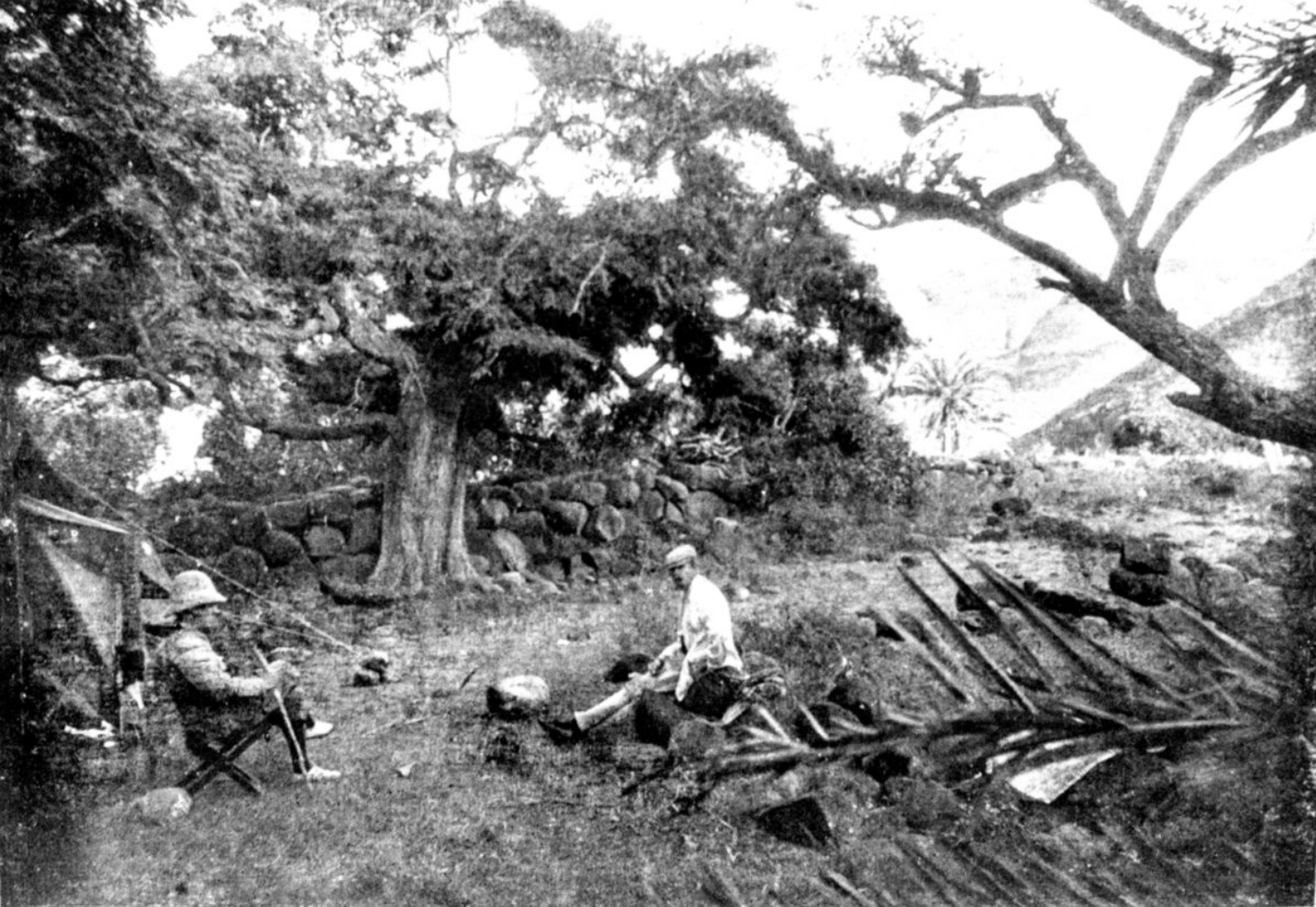
Theodore Bent and Ernest Bennett (seated left) at the ‘breakwater’ at ‘Feréghe’, SocotraPhoto taken by Mabel Bent

In November 1894 Mabel and Theodore Bent left London and travelled to India before leaving for what is now western Oman. Hoping for more success, they planned to cover a smaller area, and this expedition had a special focus on the regional spice industry. Although they planned a second attempt to explore the Hadhramout, difficult terrain prevented them from travelling as far as they had hoped. Once again, Imam Sharif accompanied the pair. Mabel photographed one of the cities (Al Balad and Robat) which they investigated in Mirbat.

==== Socotra ====
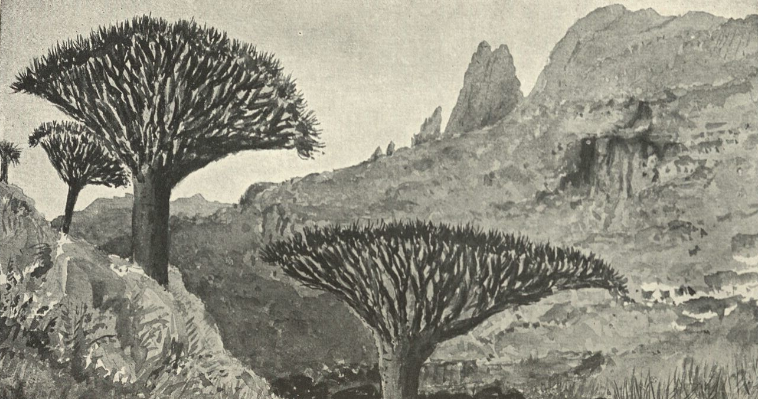
Dragon’s-blood Trees at Yehazahaz

The Bents travelled to the island of Socotra in the Arabian sea in the winter of 1896, accompanied by their assistant Manthaios Simos and Ernest N. Bennett, ‘Fellow of Hertford College, Oxford’, who would be contributing to the costs. The party studied evidence of Christianity in the Eriosh plain on the island, and investigated some ruins. Mabel wrote about the local Socotra dragon tree and aloe plants.

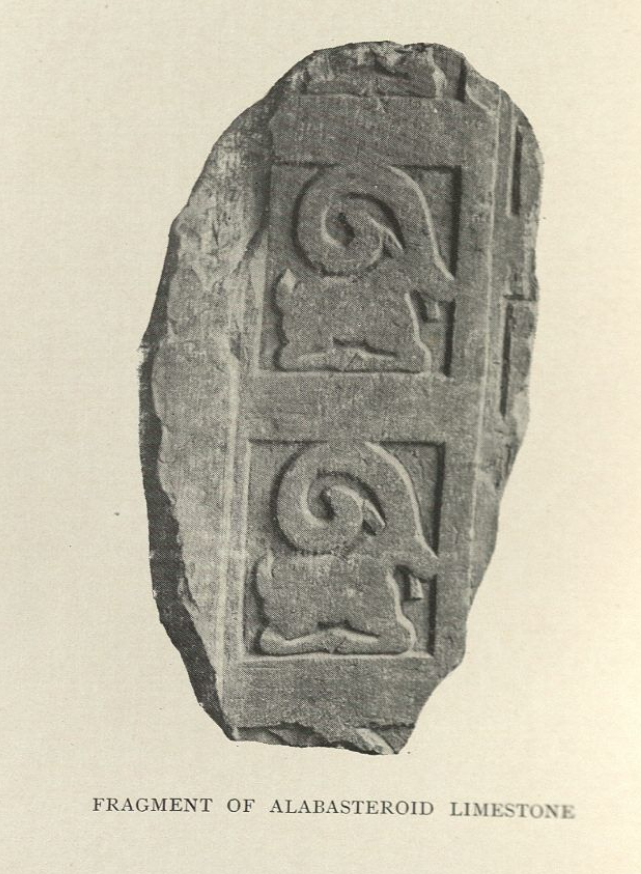
Fragment of Alabasteroid Limestone from Southern Arabia

==== Beled Fadhli and Beled Fafei ====
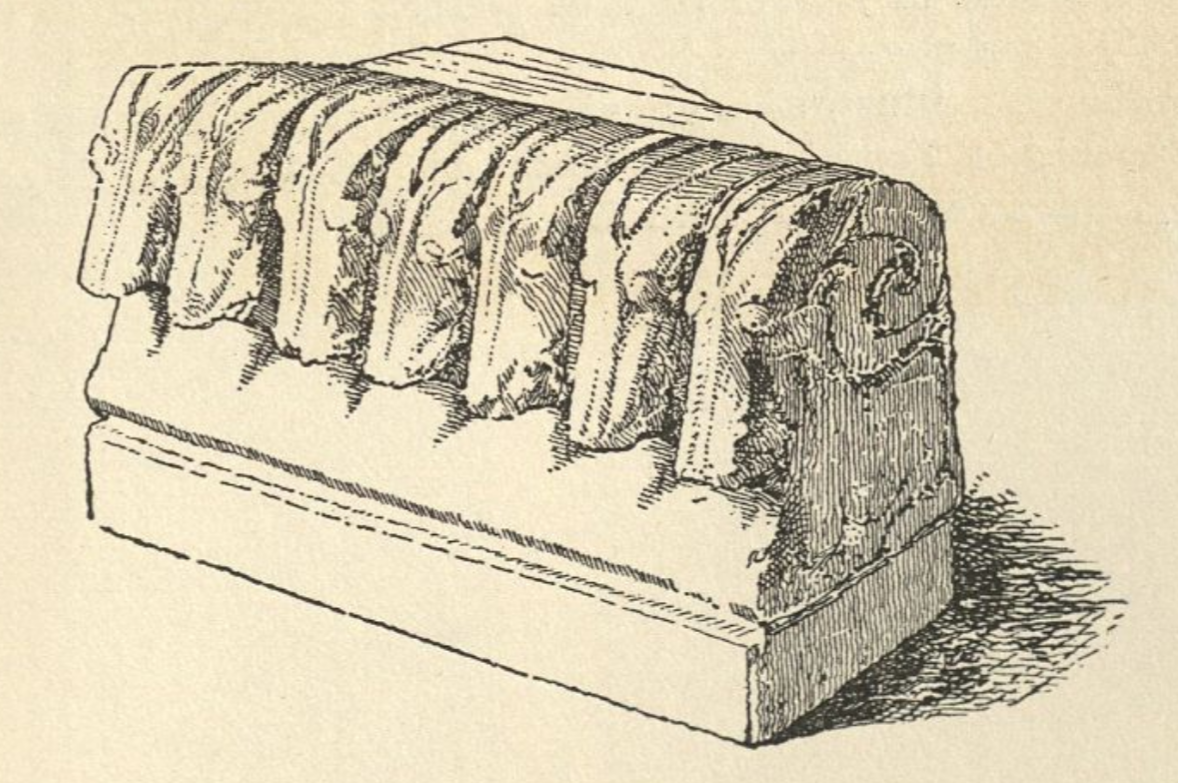
Goats ornamental feature illustrated in Southern Arabia.

In February 1897, after touring Socotra, the Bents returned to Aden and proceeded east to explore the Yafei and Fadhli districts. Before long, the couple were stricken with malarial fever and had to be rushed back to Aden by boat. Bent records her husband’s sickness in early March, and by March 26, the couple were hospitalized. Having recovered somewhat they returned to London in May, but Theodore suffered a sudden relapse and died within a few days. This ill-fated expedition did not repeat the archaeological successes of their previous journeys to the region, which included artefacts such as the illustrated limestone fragment with two carved goats and an ornamental feature with a row of six carved goats.

== Solo-Travels and Later Life ==
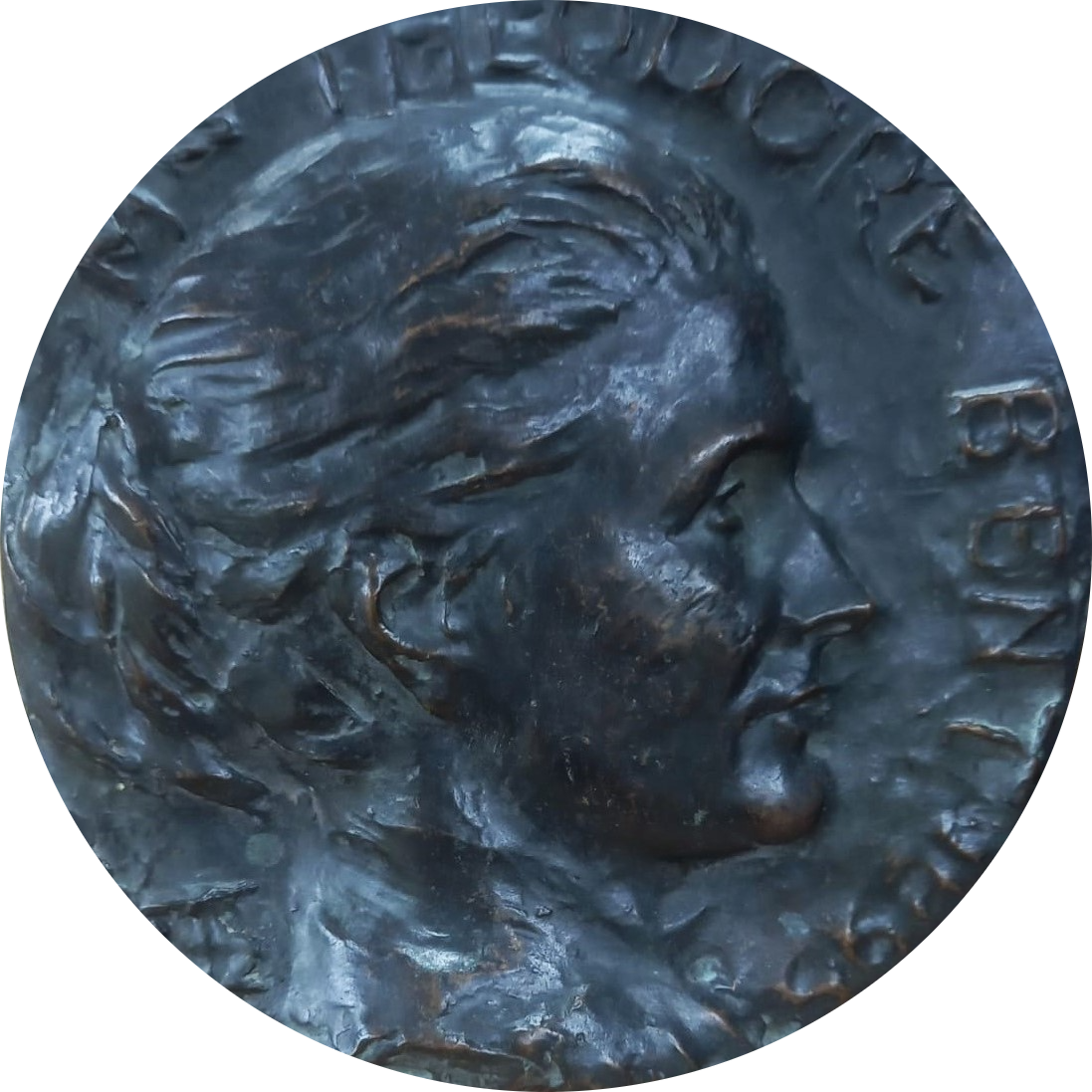
Mabel Bent, a bronze portrait relief (c. 25 cm, 2 kg) by Thomas Stirling Lee, dated 1895 (Bent Archive collection)

Theodore Bent died in May 1897 of malarial complications after a hurried return to London from Aden, where the couple were both hospitalized at the end of their last journey together.

The year after her husband's death, Bent made a ‘Cook’s’ Tour’ visit to Egypt and the Nile. She attempted a last diary, which she headed 'A lonely useless journey'. It is the last of her travel notebooks in the archives of the Hellenic and Roman Library, Senate House, London.

Until 1914, Mabel Bent was a regular visitor to the Holy Land. In Jerusalem, Bent joined the 'Garden Tomb Association', whose members were dedicated to preserving the Garden Tomb, a tomb-site just outside the Damascus Gate, which they believed to be Jesus' tomb. Bent was made London secretary and later co-edited an update of the guidebook, with Charlotte Hussey, a fellow Irishwoman, who was the official custodian of the tomb in Jerusalem. Bent and Hussey fell out with the local consular official, John Dickson, which resulted ultimately in questions to the House of Commons and an enquiry. Documents in Bent's Foreign Office files contain comments such as: 'A most tiresome and persistent woman'; 'Could not the F.O. cause these women to be ejected from the place?'; 'It would be an excellent thing if Mrs. Bent could be prosecuted for libel'; 'She is a very vindictive and obnoxious person, and has given the unfortunate Consul for a long time past a great deal of trouble by her vicious proceedings'.

In 1900 Mabel met with Moses B. Cotsworth and George Frederick Wright and travelled with them. Unfortunately, she decided to ride with the caravan while the rest of the party hurried to Bethlehem. At some point around Jebel Usdum, south of Jerusalem, her horse rolled on her, breaking her leg. She sent a guide to find the gentlemen who returned and, with the help of the guides, carried her to the hospital in Jerusalem. Her sister Ethel was required to travel from Ireland to nurse her.

=== Recognition ===
Mabel Bent became a member of the Hellenic Society in 1885. In the late 1920s, her niece transferred Mabel’s Chronicles and some notebooks of her husband to the Hellenic Society, London.

Bent was suggested as a possible inclusion among the first women Fellows of the Royal Geographical Society. The suggestion began from an article in the Observer (April 1893), on the eve of the debate as to whether more women Fellows should be appointed in the future, after the first group the previous year. This article concludes: '... the battle of the ladies promises to become historic in the annals of the Society… On the original question of the eligibility of women as Fellows of the Society it is scarcely possible that there can be two opinions. Mrs. Bishop (Miss Isabella Bird) and Miss Gordon Cumming are ladies who are surely as much entitled to membership of the Royal Geographical Society as are the great majority of the gentlemen who write F.R.G.S. after their names, and Mrs. Theodore Bent, Mrs. St. George Littledale, Mrs. Archibald Little, and a host of others might be named who have shared their husbands' travels in little known lands, and may fairly claim such privileges as Fellowship of the Royal Geographical Society confers.' However, by the end of July 1893, the then RGS president, Sir Mountstuart Elphinstone Grant Duff, had resigned over the failed vote to continue admitting women Fellows and no more women were admitted again until 1913.

== Publications and Academic Contributions ==
Bent published four books.

Southern Arabia (1900): a travel book she prepared from her notebooks and those of her husband covering all their journeys in the region.

A Patience Pocket Book (1903): a small anthology of card games for travellers. The pocket-sized book was just three by two inches.

Anglo-Saxons from Palestine; or, The imperial mystery of the lost tribes (1908): based on her interests in British Israelism. Based on Biblical genealogies, folklore, and British accomplishments, she argued that the English descended from the Hebrews and that the British fulfilled Biblical prophecies about Israel.

Garden Tomb, Golgotha and the Garden of Resurrection (1920): Her final publication was a revised edition of a guide to the Garden Tomb in Jerusalem.

All of Bent's original diaries held in the archive of the Hellenic Society, London, except for those covering the couple's trip to Ethiopia in 1893, have now been digitized and are available on open access.

Many of the finds and acquisitions the couple collected on their travels are in the British Museum and the Pitt Rivers Museum, Oxford. Some examples of Greek island costumes Mabel Bent brought home from Greece are now in the Victoria and Albert Museum in London and the Benaki Museum, Athens. Many of Bent's acquisitions from overseas remained with her until her final years. In 1926 she presented a large amount to the British Museum. She was also in the habit of opening her home for charitable events to display her collection – described as 'more interesting than many museums'.

== Death ==
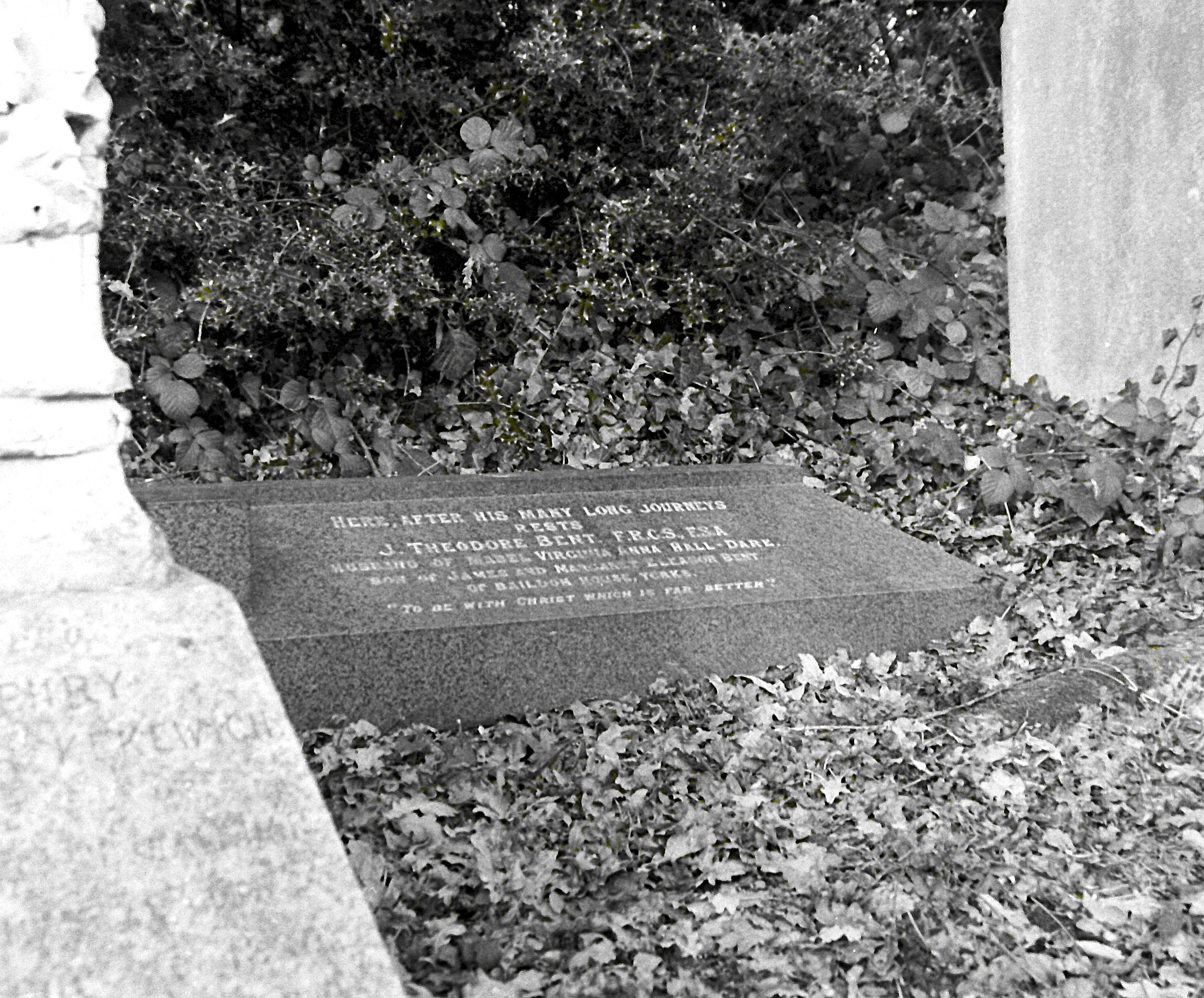
Theodore and Mabel Bent share a grave and memorial (centre) in the churchyard of St Mary’s, Theydon Bois, Essex, UK.

Mabel Bent died in her London home on 3 July 1929, her death certificate citing 'myocardial failure' and 'rheumatoid arthritis (chronic)'.

Theodore and Mabel Bent share a grave and memorial (right) in the churchyard of St Mary’s, Theydon Bois, Essex, UK. The inscription reads: ‘Here, after his many long journeys rests J. Theodore Bent, FRGS, FSA, husband of Mabel Virginia Anna Hall-Dare, son of James and Margaret Eleanor Bent of Baildon House, Yorks. “To be with Christ which is far better.”’ The red granite memorial has been moved from its original location within the Hall Dare section of the cemetery.
