= Charlotte Hussey (poet) =

Canadian poet

Charlotte Hussey is Montreal-based poet, literary critic and English professor at Dawson College. She completed her MA '79 at Concordia University, MFA '91 at Warren Wilson College, and PhD '99 at McGill University. Her doctorate thesis was on the twentieth-century poet H.D. She also teaches creative and academic writing at McGill University and has taught on Northern Quebec Aboriginal reserves. Outside her writing life, she is also a yoga instructor and Creativity Coach.

She participated in Dial-A-Poem Montreal 1985–1987.

== Publications ==
=== Poetry ===
- Rue Sainte Famille. Montreal, QC: Véhicule Press, 1990.
- The Head Will Continue to Sing. Montreal, QC: Over The Moon, 2000.
- Glossing the Spoils. Stroud, Glos: Awen Publications, May 2012.
