= Charlotte Hussey (researcher) =

Irish woman researcher

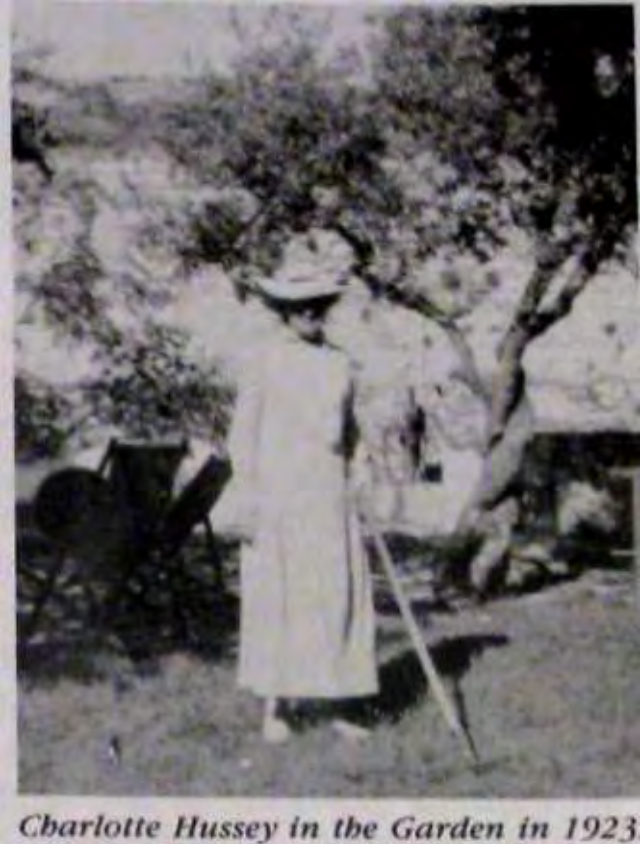
- Born: 24 March 1864; Rathpeacon, County Cork
- Died: 1956
- Organization: Garden Tomb Association
- Father: Samuel Murray Hussey

Charlotte Hussey was an Irish researcher and administrator for the Garden Tomb association in the early twentieth century.

== Early life ==
Hussey was born in Rathpeacon, County Cork in 1864. She was one of seven children born to Julia Agnes Hussey (née Hickson) and land agent Samuel Murray Hussey. Her father wrote about his work in his book, The Reminiscences of an Irish Land Agent. He was politically active and, on 28 November 1884, a dynamite explosion happened in their home, after he spoke critically about the Irish National Land League. Fearing for their safety, the family moved to London, where he attempted a run for parliament in 1888.

== Involvement with the Garden Tomb Association ==
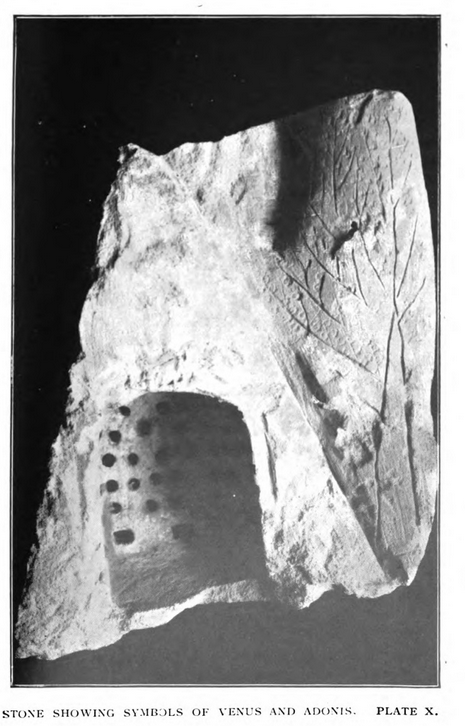
Stone showing symbols of Venus and Adonis, found by Charlotte Hussey in the Garden Tomb site.

In the 1890s, Hussey moved to Palestine. In 1893, Hussey and Louisa Hope worked to found the Garden Tomb Association. There, she was a significant donor to the association's purchase of a tomb, which was completed in 1894. Hussey acted as a custodian and researcher at the site. In 1923, she unearthed a temple to Venus at the tomb site, and she and Mabel Bent (widow of the explorer James Theodore Bent), another woman involved with the tomb, edited Arthur William Crawley Boevey's book on the site, The Garden Tomb, Golgotha and the Garden of the Resurrection.

== Personal life ==
While in Jerusalem, Hussey faced some controversy after a falling out with a member of the London Jews Society named William Dunn. Hussey claimed that Dunn spurned her at the request of Consul John Dickson’s wife. The drama divided the British community in Jerusalem, leading to accusations of adultery and calls for the consul to be dismissed. Hussey went so far as to open a bookshop with Mabel Bent to spy on the consul, although the matter died down after Dickson's death in 1906.

Charlotte Hussey was later the editor and secretary of the Kerry Archaeological Society and edited their magazine in 1908 until it ceased being printed in 1920 due to the Irish War of Independence. Hussey lived in Jerusalem as late as 1923. She died in London in 1956, at 92 years old.
