= List of speakers of the House of Commons of England =

This is a list of the speakers of the House of Commons of England, up to 1707.

For speakers of the House of Commons of Great Britain from 1707 to 1800 and of the House of Commons of the United Kingdom from 1801, see List of speakers of the British House of Commons.

== List of parlours or prolocutors before 1377 ==
Before 1377, the Speaker was referred to by terms such as the parlour and the prolocutor. Some of them presided, and Peter de Montfort and Peter de la Mare were certainly presiding officers of the Commons. The others named in this section were spokesmen. Some of them held judicial offices. It is not certain that they presided over the Commons.

The date given is that of the first meeting of the Parliament in question. Only Parliaments for which a presiding officer is known or supposed are included in the table.

Parliament	Presiding officer	Constituency	Notes
First English Parliament, 11 June 1258	Peter de Montfort		First identified presiding officer of the English House of Commons, styled prolocutor
27th of Edward II, 7 January 1327	William Trussell		Joint spokesman of Lords and Commons, styled procurator
10th of Edward III, 16 March 1332	Henry de Beaumont		...
11th of Edward III, 9 September 1332	Geoffrey le Scrope		...
26th of Edward III, 29 March 1340	William Trussell		...
30th of Edward III, 28 April 1343	William Trussell		Spokesman for the Commons alone
33rd of Edward III, 1347	William de Thorpe		...
34th of Edward III, 1348	William de Thorpe		...
36th of Edward III, 9 February 1351	William de Shareshull		...
55th of Edward III, 28 April 1376	Sir Peter de la Mare	Herefordshire	First term (second after 1377)

- Source: Laundy The Office of Speaker

== Speakers of the House of Commons of England from 1377 to 1707 ==
From	Until	Speaker	Constituency	Notes
January 1377	2 March 1377	Sir Thomas Hungerforde	Wiltshire	First presiding officer styled Speaker. 56th Parliament of Edward III.
October 1377	28 November 1377	Sir Peter de la Mare	Herefordshire	Second term (first before 1377). 1st of Richard II.
22 October 1378	16 November 1378	Sir James Pickering	Westmorland	First term. 2nd of Richard II.
January 1380	6 December 1380	Sir John Guildesborough	Essex	4th and 5th of Richard II
18 November 1381	25 February 1382	Sir Richard Waldegrave	Suffolk	6th of Richard II and possibly in the next two Parliaments
23 February 1383	10 March 1383	Sir James Pickering	Yorkshire	Second term. 9th of Richard II and possibly in several other Parliaments.
1383	1389	unknown	unknown	10th to 21st of Richard II
28 January 1394	1398	Sir John Bussy	Lincolnshire	Styled Commune Parlour. 22nd, 23rd (probably), 24th and 25th of Richard II
1398	1398	none	none	25th of Richard II adjourned to Shrewsbury on 28 January 1398. Its authority was transferred to a Committee of 12 peers and 6 commoners (including Bussy, who was executed in 1399)
14 October 1399	15 October 1399	Sir John Cheney (or Cheyne)	Gloucestershire	Resigned after two days as Speaker, 1st of Henry IV.
15 October 1399	19 November 1399	John Doreward	Essex	First term. 1st of Henry IV.
21 January 1401	1402	Sir Arnold Savage	Kent	First term. 2nd of Henry IV and possibly 3rd.
3 October 1402	25 November 1402	Sir Henry Redford	Lincolnshire	4th of Henry IV
15 January 1404	10 April 1404	Sir Arnold Savage	Kent	Second term. 5th of Henry IV.
7 October 1404	14 November 1404	Sir William Esturmy (or Sturmy)	Devon	6th of Henry IV
2 March 1406	22 December 1406	Sir John Tiptoft	Huntingdonshire	7th of Henry IV. First Speaker created a peer (1st Baron Tiptoft, 1426).
25 October 1407	19 December 1411	Thomas Chaucer	Oxfordshire	First term. 8th-10th of Henry IV.
1412	1413	unknown	unknown	
8 May 1413	3 June 1413	William Stourton	Dorset	Styled parlour. 1st of Henry V.
3 June 1413	9 June 1413	John Doreward	Essex	Second term. 1st of Henry V.
1 May 1414	29 May 1414	Sir Walter Hungerford	Wiltshire	2nd of Henry V. Created 1st Baron Hungerford, 1426.
19 November 1414	1415	Thomas Chaucer	Oxfordshire	Second term. 3rd of Henry V.
5 November 1415	1415	Sir Richard Redman (or Redmayne)	Yorkshire	4th of Henry V
18 March 1416	May 1416	Sir Walter Beauchamp	Wiltshire	Styled Prolocutor. 5th of Henry V.
October 1416	November 1419	Roger Flower	Rutland	First term. 6th-8th of Henry V.
1420	1421	Roger Hunt	Bedfordshire	First term. 9th of Henry V.
1421	1421	Thomas Chaucer	Oxfordshire	Third term. 10th of Henry V.
3 December 1421	1422	Richard Baynard	Essex	11th of Henry V
11 November 1422	18 December 1422	Roger Flower	Rutland	Second term. 1st of Henry VI.
21 October 1423	28 February 1424	Sir John Russell	Herefordshire	First term. 2nd of Henry VI.
2 May 1425	14 July 1425	Sir Thomas Walton (or Wauton)	Bedfordshire	3rd of Henry VI
28 February 1426	1 June 1426	Sir Richard Vernon	Derbyshire	4th of Henry VI
15 October 1427	25 March 1428	Sir John Tyrrell	Hertfordshire	First term. 5th of Henry VI.
23 September 1429	23 February 1430	Sir William Alington	Cambridgeshire	6th of Henry VI
13 January 1431	20 March 1431	Sir John Tyrrell	Essex	Second term. 7th of Henry VI.
14 May 1432	17 July 1432	Sir John Russell	Herefordshire	Second term. 8th of Henry VI.
10 July 1433	21 December 1433	Roger Hunt	Huntingdonshire	Second term. 9th of Henry VI.
12 October 1435	23 December 1435	John Bowes	Nottinghamshire	10th of Henry VI
23 January 1437	March 1437	Sir John Tyrrell	Essex	Third term. 11th of Henry VI.
19 March 1437	27 March 1437	William Burley (or Boerley)	Shropshire	First term. 11th of Henry VI.
13 November 1439	27 May 1442	William Tresham	Northamptonshire	First term. 12th and 13th of Henry VI.
26 February 1445	9 April 1445	William Burley (or Boerley)	Shropshire	Second term. Styled Prolocutor. 14th of Henry VI.
11 February 1447	3 March 1447	William Tresham	Northamptonshire	Second term. 15th of Henry VI.
13 February 1449	16 July 1449	Sir John Say	Cambridgeshire	First term. 16th of Henry VI.
8 November 1449	8 November 1449	Sir John Popham	Hampshire	Excused due to ill health. 17th of Henry VI.
8 November 1449	1450	William Tresham	Northamptonshire	Third term. 17th of Henry VI.
7 November 1450	May 1451	Sir William Oldhall	Hertfordshire	18th of Henry VI
8 March 1453	16 February 1454	Thomas Thorpe	Essex	19th of Henry VI. Left chair when imprisoned.
16 February 1454	April 1454	Sir Thomas Charlton	Middlesex	19th of Henry VI
10 July 1455	January 1456	Sir John Wenlock	Bedfordshire	Styled Prolocutor. 20th of Henry VI. Created 1st Baron Wenlock, 1461.
21 November 1459	20 December 1459	Sir Thomas Tresham	Northamptonshire	Styled Prolocutor. 21st of Henry VI.
8 October 1460	1460	John Green	Essex	22nd of Henry VI
5 November 1461	6 May 1462	Sir James Strangeways	Yorkshire	Styled Prolocutor. 1st of Edward IV.
30 April 1463	1468	Sir John Say	Hertfordshire	Second term. 2nd-3rd of Edward IV.
1469	1470	unknown	unknown	4th-5th of Edward IV
7 October 1472	1478	William Allington (of Bottisham)	Cambridgeshire	Grandson of the previous Speaker William Alington. 6th-7th of Edward IV.
21 January 1483	February 1483	John Wood (or Wode)	Surrey	Styled Prolocutor. 8th of Edward IV.
24 January 1484	20 February 1484	William Catesby	Northamptonshire	1st of Richard III
8 November 1485	1486	Sir Thomas Lovell	Northamptonshire	Styled Prolocutor. 1st of Henry VII.
10 November 1487	1488	Sir John Mordaunt	Bedfordshire	Styled Prolocutor. 2nd of Henry VII.
14 January 1489	27 February 1490	Sir Thomas Fitzwilliam	Lincolnshire	Styled Prolocutor. 3rd of Henry VII.
18 October 1491	March 1492	Sir Richard Empson	Northamptonshire	Styled Prolocutor. 4th of Henry VII.
15 October 1495	1495	Sir Robert Drury	Suffolk	5th of Henry VII
19 January 1497	1497	Sir Thomas Englefield	Berkshire	First term. 6th of Henry VII.
25 January 1504	1504	Edmond Dudley	Staffordshire	Styled Prolocutor. 8th of Henry VII.
23 January 1510	23 February 1510	Sir Thomas Englefield	Berkshire	Second term. Styled Prolocutor. 1st of Henry VIII.
5 February 1512	December 1513	Sir Robert Sheffield	Lincolnshire	Styled Prolocutor. 2nd of Henry VIII.
6 February 1515	22 December 1515	Sir Thomas Nevill	Kent	Styled Prolocutor. 3rd of Henry VIII.
16 April 1523	13 August 1523	Sir Thomas More	Middlesex	Styled Prolocutor. 4th of Henry VIII.
5 November 1529	26 January 1533	Sir Thomas Audley	Essex	Styled Prolocutor. 5th of Henry VIII. Created 1st Baron Audley, 1538.
9 February 1533	4 April 1536	Sir Humphrey Wingfield	Great Yarmouth	5th of Henry VIII. First Borough member to be Speaker.
9 June 1536	18 July 1536	Sir Richard Rich	Colchester	6th of Henry VIII. Created 1st Baron Rich, 1547.
28 April 1539	24 July 1540	Sir Nicholas Hare	Norfolk	7th of Henry VIII
19 January 1542	28 March 1544	Sir Thomas Moyle	Peterborough	8th of Henry VIII
November 1545	15 April 1552	Sir John Baker	Huntingdonshire	9th of Henry VIII and 1st of Edward VI
2 March 1553	31 March 1553	Sir James Dyer	Cambridgeshire	2nd of Edward VI
5 October 1553	5 December 1553	John Pollard	Oxfordshire	1st of Mary I
2 April 1554	5 May 1554	Sir Robert Broke	City of London	2nd of Mary I
12 November 1554	16 January 1555	Sir Clement Higham	West Looe	3rd of Mary I
21 October 1555	9 December 1555	John Pollard	Chippenham	4th of Mary I
20 January 1558	17 November 1558	Sir William Cordell	Suffolk	5th of Mary I
25 January 1559	8 May 1559	Sir Thomas Gargrave	Yorkshire	1st of Elizabeth I
12 January 1563	10 April 1563	Thomas Williams	Exeter	2nd of Elizabeth I
1 October 1566	2 January 1567	Richard Onslow	Steyning	2nd of Elizabeth I
2 April 1571	29 May 1571	Sir Christopher Wray	Ludgershall	3rd of Elizabeth I
8 May 1572	1576	Sir Robert Bell	Lyme Regis	4th of Elizabeth I
18 January 1581	19 April 1583	Sir John Popham	Bristol	4th of Elizabeth I
23 November 1584	14 September 1586	Sir John Puckering	Bedford	5th of Elizabeth I
29 October 1586	23 March 1587	Sir John Puckering	Gatton	6th of Elizabeth I

Source: Laundy The Office of Speaker

From	Until	Speaker	Constituency	Notes
1588	1589	Sir Thomas Snagge	(Bedford)	
1592	1593	Sir Edward Coke	(Norfolk)	Solicitor General for England and Wales
1597	1598	Sir Christopher Yelverton	(Northamptonshire)	
1601		Sir John Croke	(City of London)	
1603	1611	Sir Edward Phelips	(Somerset)	
1614		Sir Randolph Crewe	(Saltash)	
1621	1622	Sir Thomas Richardson	(St Albans)	
1623	1625	Sir Thomas Crewe	(Aylesbury)	
1625	1626	Sir Heneage Finch	(City of London)	
1628	1629	Sir John Finch	(Canterbury)	(Impeached by the Long Parliament, October 1640, and fled to Holland, but returned at the Restoration)
1640		Sir John Glanville	(Bristol)	
1640	1647	William Lenthall	(Woodstock)	
1644	1645	Sir Sampson Eure	(Leominster)	Speaker in the Oxford Parliament (1644)
1647		Henry Pelham	(Grantham)	(temporary during Lenthall's abandonment of the Speakership)
1647	1653	William Lenthall	(Woodstock)	(Lenthall was restored to the Chair by the Army and remained in office until Oliver Cromwell's dismissal of the Rump)
1653		Francis Rous	(Devon)	
1654	1655	William Lenthall	(Oxfordshire)	
1656	1658	Sir Thomas Widdrington	(Northumberland)	
1657	1657	Bulstrode Whitelocke	(Buckinghamshire)	(temporary during Widdrington illness)
1658	1659	Chaloner Chute	(Middlesex)	
1659		Sir Lislebone Long	(Wells)	(temporary during Chute's illness, but was himself taken ill after only five days in office}
14 April 1659	22 April 1659	Thomas Bampfylde	(Exeter)	
1659	1660	William Lenthall	(Oxfordshire)	
1660		William Say	(Camelford)	(temporary during Lenthall illness)
1660		Sir Harbottle Grimston, 2nd Baronet	(Colchester)	
1661	1671	Sir Edward Turnour	(Hertford)	
1672		Sir Job Charlton	(Ludlow)	
1673		Sir Edward Seymour	(Totnes)	
1678		Sir Robert Sawyer	(Wycombe)	((Temporary during Seymour's illness)
1678	1679	Sir Edward Seymour	(Totnes)	
1679		Sir William Gregory	(Weobley)	
1680	1681	Sir William Williams	(Chester)	
1685	1687	Sir John Trevor	(Denbigh)	
1688	1689	Henry Powle	(Windsor)	
1689	1695	Sir John Trevor	(Yarmouth, IoW)	(expelled for corruption)
1695	1698	Paul Foley	(Hereford)	
1698	1700	Sir Thomas Littleton, 3rd Baronet	(Woodstock)	
1701	1705	Robert Harley	(New Radnor)	
1705	1707	John Smith	(Andover)	

For speakers of the House of Commons of Great Britain from 1707 to 1800 and of the House of Commons of the United Kingdom from 1801, see List of speakers of the British House of Commons.
