= Edmund Brokesbourne =

Member of the Parliament of England

Edmund Brokesbourne (c. 1340 – 1396/97), of Bradfield, Essex, was an English politician.

Brokesbourne was a member of parliament for Essex in 1386.

Parliament of England
Preceded by John Guildesborough with ?	Member of Parliament for Essex; 1386; With: Sir Robert Marney	Succeeded by Sir John Guildesborough with Thomas Coggeshall
