= High Sheriff of Essex =

Ceremonial officer of the English county of Essex

The High Sheriff of Essex was an ancient sheriff title originating in the time of the Angles, not long after the invasion of the Kingdom of England, which was in existence for around a thousand years. On 1 April 1974, under the provisions of the Local Government Act 1972, the title of Sheriff of Essex was retitled High Sheriff of Essex. The high shrievalties are the oldest secular titles under the Crown in England and Wales, their purpose being to represent the monarch at a local level, historically in the shires.

The office was a powerful position in earlier times, as sheriffs were responsible for the maintenance of law and order and various other roles. It was only in 1908 under Edward VII that the lord-lieutenant became more senior than the high sheriff. Since then the position of high sheriff has become more ceremonial, with many of its previous responsibilities transferred to High Court judges, magistrates, coroners, local authorities and the police.

This is a list of sheriffs and high sheriffs of Essex. Prior to 1567 the Sheriff of Essex was also the Sheriff of Hertfordshire.

== List of joint sheriffs ==
- 939 AD: Hugh De Lytton, Sheriff of Litton Parish
- c.1042–1049: Leofeild
- 1067–1070: Jacque de Buckland
- Robert FitzWimarc
- Swein
- Ralph Baignard
- ?-1072 Ilbert
- 1072–c.1086 Peter de Valognes
- Edward de Saresburg
- Stephen
- 1129 William of Eynesford
- 1130 Richard Basset
- 1139 Alberie de Vere II, and Richard Basset, Justices of England
- 1140-1142 Geoffrey de Mandeville
- 1147 Maurice
- 1155 Richard Basset, Alberie de Vere

== List of sheriffs of Essex and Hertfordshire ==
=== Henry II ===
- 1156-57 Richard de Luci
- 1158-63 Maurice de Tiretie
- 1164 Fuelle de Bovilla
- 1165-68 Nicolas the Dean
- 1169 Nicolas the Clerk
- 1170-81 Robert de Mancell
- 1182-88 Otho, the son of William

=== Richard I ===
- 1189-90 Otho, the son of William
- 1191 Geoffrey, the son of Peter
- 1192-93 Geoffrey, the son of Peter & Richard Heriet
- 1193 Simon of Pattishall
- 1194 Geoffrey, the son of Peter & Simon of Pattishall
- 1195 William Longchamp
- 1196 William Pointell
- 1197-98 Hugh de Neville

=== John ===
- 1199-1200 Hugh de Nevill
- 1201-1203 Richard de Montfichet
- 1204 Hugh de Nevill
- 1205-1208 Matthew Mancel
- 1209-1213 Earl Alberie
- 1214 Matthew Mancel
- 1215 Robert Mancel

=== Henry III ===
- 1216 Robert Mancel
- 1217-18 William Mancel
- 1219-20 Walter de Verdon
- 1221-22 Stephen de Segne
- 1223 Richard d’Argenton
- 1224-27 William de Cultwarden
- 1228-31 William de Coleworth
- 1232 Robert de Waltham
- 1233 William de Holewell
- 1234-35 William de Coleworth
- 1236-37 Peter de Thany
- 1238 Peter de Thany
- Richard de Gray
- 1239 Bertram de Criol
- 1240 John de Watton
- 1241 John de Watton
- 1242-44 Richard de Montfichet
- 1245 Richard de Montfichet
- 1246-49 William son of Reynald
- 1250 Richard de Whitland
- 1251-53 Hery de Helegeton
- 1254-55 Ralph de Arderne
- 1256 Thomas Rameden
- Robert Delval
- 1257-58 Hubert de Montecampo
- 1259-60 Richard de Thany
- 1261-62 Mathias Delamar
- William Delamar
- 1263 Mathias Delamar
- William Delamar
- John Bocking
- 1264 Nicholas de Espigornel
- 1265-66 Richard de Suchirch
- 1267 Richard de Suchirch
- Richard de Herlawe
- 1268 John de Canimill
- 1269 Walter de Blummil
- 1270-71 Walter de Essex

=== Edward I ===
- 1272-1273 Walter de Essex
- 1274 Thomas de Sandwie
- 1275-1277 Lawrence de Scaccario
- 1278 William de Sancto-Claro
- 1279-1283 Reginald de Ginge
- 1284 Reginald de Ginge
- 1285 William de Lambourn
- 1286 Hugh le Blunt
- 1287 Hugh le Blunt
- 1288-1289 Ralph Boxted
- 1290 Henry Grapinel
- 1291 Henry Grapinel
- 1292 (May–Dec) John Grapinel (Carbonel)
- 1292 (Dec)-1293 William de Grosse
- 1294-1296 William de Sutton
- 1297-1298 Simon de Bradenham
- 1299-1300 John de Lee
- 1301 William de Harpenden
- 1302 John de Wenegrave
- 1303 John de Bassingbourne
- 1304 John de la Lee
- 1305 John de la Lee
- John de Bassingbourne
- 1306 John de Harpesfeld

=== Edward II ===
- 1307 Edward de Baud
- 1308-09 Alan de Goldingham
- 1310 Geoffrey de la Lee
- 1311 John de la Lee
- 1312 John Aygnel
- 1313 John Ward
- 1314-17 Richard de Perrers
- 1318 John de Doure
- 1319 Ralph de Gifford
- 1320 John de Doure
- 1321 Nicholas Engain
- 1322-23 Thomas Gobyn
- 1324-26 Richard de Perrers

=== Edward III ===
- 1327 William Baud
- 1328-29 Richard de Perrers
- 1330–31 John de Wanton
- 1332 John de Hay
- 1333–1334 Adam Bloy
- William Boyd
- 1334-39 Sir John de Coggeshall
- 1340 William Atemore
- 1341 Richard de Monte Caviso
- 1342 Henry Garnet
- 1343-46 Sir John de Coggeshall
- 1347 Sir John de Coggeshall
- Peter de Boxted
- 1348 William Bret
- Humphrey de Walden
- 1349 Peter de Boxted
- 1350 Thomas Lacy
- 1351-53 Sir John de Coggeshall
- 1354 Hugh Fitz-Simon
- 1355 William de Enefeld
- 1356-57 Thomas de Chabham
- 1358-59 Roger de Louth
- 1360 Hugh Blount
- 1361 William de Lyre
- 1362 Guy de Boys
- 1363 Thomas Fitling
- 1364 John Gernon
- 1365 Thomas de Helpeston
- 1366 John Oliver
- 1367 John Oliver
- John Shardelon
- 1368 John Henxtworth
- 1369 John Henxtworth
- Roger Keterich
- 1370 Thomas de Bassingbourn
- 1371 William Baud
- 1372 John de Bampton
- 1373 John Filiol
- 1374 Edward Fitz-Simons
- 1375 John Battaile
- 1376 Robert Fitz-William

=== Richard II ===
- 1377 Robert Goldington
- 1378 Sir John Fitz-Symond of North Shoebury, Essex
- 1379 Edward Benstede of Bennington, Hertfordshire
- 1380 John Sewale
- 1381 Walter Godmaston
- 1382 Geoffrey de Dersham
- 1383 Thomas Bataill of Otes in High Laver, Essex
- 1384 John Walton
- 1385 Geoffrey Brockhole
- 1386-87 John Ruggewyn of Standon, Hertfordshire
- 1388 Henry English of Wood Ditton, Cambridgeshire
- 1388 (Dec to Jan) Sir Robert Swinburne of Little Horkesley and Matching, Essex
- 1389 Sir Walter Attelee of Albury, Hertfordshire
- 1390 Geoffrey Michale
- 1391 Sir William Coggleshall of Codham Hall and Coggeshall, Essex (1st term)
- 1392 Adam Frances
- 1393 Thomas Coggeshall
- 1394 Thomas Sampkin
- 1395-97 William Bateman
- 1398 Sir Robert Turk of Hitchin, Hertfordshire

=== Henry IV ===
- 1399 (Aug–Sep) John Doreward of Bocking, Essex
- 1399 (Sep-Nov) Robert Tey of Marks Tey, Essex
- 1399 Edward Benstede of Bennington, Hertfordshire
- 1400 Sir John Howard of Stansted Mountfichet (1st term)
- 1401 Sir William Marney of Layer Marney, Essex
- 1402 Helming Leget of Black Notley, Essex
- 1403 Sir Thomas Swinbourn of Little Horkesley and East Mersea, Essex
- 1404 Sir William Coggleshall of Codham Hall and Coggeshall, Essex (2nd term)
- 1405 Edward Benstede of Bennington, Hertfordshire
- 1406 Sir Gerard Braybrooke of Danbury, Essex
- 1407 Helming Leget of Black Notley, Essex
- 1408 William Loveney
- 1409 John Walden
- 1410 Thomas Aston
- 1411 Sir William Coggleshall of Codham Hall and Coggeshall, Essex (3rd term)

=== Henry V ===
- 1412 Philip Englefield
- 1413 Sir John Tyrell of Heron (1st term)
- 1414 Sir John Howard of Stansted Mountfichet (2nd term)
- 1415 Sir Thomas de la Barre of Ayot St. Lawrence
- 1416 Lewis John of West Horndon
- 1417 Reginald Malyns
- 1418 Sir John Howard of Stansted Mountfichet (3rd term)
- 1419 Robert Darcy of Maldon, Essex

=== Henry VI ===
- 1420-21 Lewis John of West Horndon
- 1422 Sir John Tyrrell of Heron (2nd term)
- 1423 Sir Maurice Brewyn of South Okington (1st term)
- 1424 John Barley of Albury, Hertfordshire
- 1425 John Doreward of Bocking
- 1426 Conand Aske
- 1427 Thomas Tyrell of Heron
- 1428 John Hotoft of Knebworth
- 1429 Nicholas Richbull
- 1430 Henry Langley of Rickling
- 1431 Sir Nicholas Thorley
- 1432 John Durward
- 1433 Robert Whytingham of Pendley
- 1434 Geoffrey Rockyll
- 1435 Sir Maurice Brewyn of South Okington (2nd term)
- 1436 Edward Tyrell
- 1437 Richard Alrede
- 1438 Robert Whytingham
- 1439 Richard Witherton
- 1440 Thomas Tyrell
- 1441 Ralph Asteley
- 1442 Nicholas Morley of Hallingbury
- 1443 John Hende, the elder (d.1461)
- 1444 Thomas Tyrell of Heron
- 1445 Thomas Pigott
- 1446 Thomas Baud of Hadham Hall
- 1447 John Hende, the elder (d.1461)
- 1448 George Langham
- 1449 Geoffrey Rockhill
- 1450 Philip Boteler of Watton
- 1451 Thomas Barrington
- 1452 John Godmanston
- 1453 Sir Thomas Cobham
- 1454 Humphrey Bohun
- 1455 Ralph Bothe
- 1456 John Hende, the younger (d.1464)
- 1457 Lewis John
- 1458 Robert Darcy of Danbury
- 1459 Thomas Tyrell of Heron

=== Edward IV ===
- 1460 Thomas Ince
- 1461-62 Thomas Langley
- 1463 Sir John Clay
- 1464 Roger Ree
- 1465 Sir Lawrence Raynsford
- 1466 Henry Barley
- 1467 Sir William Pirton
- 1468 Walter Writell
- 1469 Ralph Baud – Hadham Hall
- 1470 Walter Writell
- 1471 Sir Roger Ree
- 1472 Alured Cornburgh
- 1473 John Sturgeon – Hitchin
- 1474 Richard Flance
- 1475 Henry Langley
- 1476 William Green
- 1477 Alured Cornburgh
- 1478 John Wode
- 1479 John Sturgeon – Hitchin
- 1480 Thomas Tyrell – Heron
- 1481 John Fortescue
- 1482 William Say – Broxbourne

=== Edward V ===
- 1483 William Say – Broxbourne

=== Richard III ===
- 1483-84 Sir William Say – Broxbourne
- 1485 John Sturgeon Esq of Hitchin

=== Henry VII ===
- 1486 (half the year) Sir Robert Percy
- 1486 Sir John Fortescue, Kt of Hatfield
- 1487 Henry Marney
- 1488 Sir William Pyrton
- 1489 Henry Tey
- 1490 John Boteler of Watton
- 1491 Robert Turbeville
- 1492 John Berfeild
- 1493 Henry Marney (2nd term)
- 1494 Sir Richard Fitz-Lewis of West Horndon
- 1495 Richard Plomer
- 1496 William Pulter of Hitchin
- 1497 Robert Newport of Pelham
- 1498 Thomas Peryent of Digswell
- 1499 Sir John Verney of Pendley
- 1500 Sir Roger Wentworth of Codham Hall
- 1501 Sir Henry Tye
- 1502 William Pyrton
- 1503 Humphrey Tyrell of Heron
- 1504-05 William Skipworth of St Albans
- 1506 Roger Darcy
- 1507-08 John Brocket of Hatfield
- 1509 Humphrey Tyrell of Heron

=== Henry VIII ===
- 1510 John Leventhorpe – Shingey Hall
- 1511 William Lytton – Knebworth
- 1512 Anthony Darcy – Danbury
- 1513 Edward Tyrell – Heron
- 1514 John Seyntclere
- 1515 William Fitz-William
- 1516 Sir John Vere
- 1517 Thomas Bonham
- 1518 Sir Thomas Tyrell – Heron
- 1519 Sir John Cutts
- 1520 Sir John Vere
- 1521 Thomas Bonham of Stanway, Essex
- 1522 Sir Thomas Tey
- 1523 John Christmas
- 1524 Henry Barley of Albury, Hertfordshire
- 1525 Sir John Vere
- 1526 Thomas Leventhorpe – Shingey Hall
- 1527 Thomas Bonham of Stanway, Essex
- 1528 Edward Tyrell – Heron
- 1529 Sir Giles Capel – Hadham Hall
- 1530 John Bowles – Wellington
- 1531 John Brocket – Hatfield
- 1532 John Smith
- 1533 Sir Philip Boteler – Watton
- 1534 Sir Brian Tuke – Hatfield
- 1535 Sir William West
- 1536 Thomas Peryent – Digswell
- 1537 Sir Henry Parker of Furneux Pelham, Hertfordshire
- 1538 Sir John Raynsford of Bradfield, Essex
- 1539 John Smith
- 1540 Sir Philip Boteler – Watton
- 1541 Sir John Mordaunt of West Horndon, Essex
- 1542 Ralph Rowlet – St Albans
- 1543 John Bowles – Wellington
- John Sewster
- 1544 John Wentworth
- 1545 Anthony Cooke of Gidea Hall, Essex
- 1546 Robert Lytton – Knebworth
- 1547 John Conyngsby – North Mimms

=== Edward VI ===
- 1547 Edward Brocket of Hatfield
- 1548 John Cock of Broxbourne, Hertfordshire
- 1549 Sir John Gates – Cheshunt
- 1550 Sir George Norton
- 1551 Sir Henry Tyrell – Heron
- 1552 Sir Thomas Pope – Tittenhanger

=== Mary ===
- 1553 Sir John Wentworth

=== Philip & Mary ===
- 1554 Edward Brocket of Hatfield
- 1555 William Harris of Cricksea
- 1556 Sir John Boteler of Watton-at-Stone
- 1557 Sir Thomas Pope of Tittenhanger
- 1558 Thomas Mildmay of Moulsham

=== Elizabeth ===
- 1559 Ralph Rowlett of Holywell House, St Albans, Hertfordshire
- 1560 Edward Capel – Hadham Hall
- 1561 Sir Thomas Golding
- 1562 Sir Thomas Barrington
- 1563 Henry Fortescue of Faulkbourne
- 1564 William Ayloffe
- 1565 Robert Chester – Royston
- 1566 John Brocket of Brocket Hall, Hatfield, Hertfordshire

== Sheriffs of Essex ==
From 1567 Sheriffs were Sheriffs of Essex only.

=== 1567–1600 ===
- 1568: Thomas Lucas of Colchester
- 1569: Sir Thomas Golding
- 1570: James Altham of Mark Hall, Latton
- 1571: Edmund Barrett of Belhus, Aveley
- 1572: Sir Thomas Mildmay of Moulsham, Essex
- 1573: Arthur Harrys of Creeksea
- 1573: Henry Hunt(e) at time he married Jane Vere in Burke's Landed Gentry of Ireland, 1912 page 342
- 1574: Edmund Pyrton
- 1575: John Petre, 1st Baron Petre of Ingatestone Hall
- 1576: Wistan (Winstan) Browne of South Weald and West Roding
- 1577: Gabriel (later Sir Gabriel) Poyntz of North Ockendon
- 1578: Edmund Huddleston (Hodleston) of Newport Pond (i.e. Newport)
- 1579: Henry Capell of Little Hadham
- 1580: Sir Thomas Barrington
- 1581 (Feb): Thomas Darcy of Tolleshunt Darcy
- 1581 (Nov): John Wentworth of Gosfield
- 1582: Thomas Taye or Teye
- 1583: Thomas Lucas of Colchester
- 1584: Henry Appleton
- 1585: Brian Darcy of Tiptree Priory
- 1586: Arthur Harris
- 1587: Robert Wroth of Loughton Hall
- 1588: Edmund Huddleston (Hodleston)
- 1589: Gabriel (later Sir Gabriel) Poyntz of North Ockendon
- 1590: Sir Ralph Wiseman
- 1591: Richard Warren of Claybury
- 1592: John Wentworth of Gosfield Hall
- 1593: Humphrey Mildmay of Danbury
- 1594: William Ayloffe of Brittains, Hornchurch (son of William, HS 1564)
- 1595: Edward Sulyard of Flemings
- 1596: George Harvey of Marks Hall, Dagenham
- 1597: Thomas Mildmay of Barnes in Springfield
- 1598: William Harris of Creeksea
- 1599: Jerome Weston of Roxwell
- 1600: Sir Thomas Meade of Wendon Lofts

=== 1601–1700 ===
- 1601: Henry Smith (alias Nevill)
- 1602: Richard Francke (Franke) of Beeleigh Abbey, Maldon
- 1603: Henry Maynard of St. Albans, Hertfordshire and later of Little Easton, Essex
- 1604: Thomas Rawlins
- 1605:
- 1606 (Jan-Nov): Sir John Sammes of Langford Hall, Wickham Bishops
- 1606: Sir Gamaliel Capell of Rookwood Hall, Abbess Roding
- 1607: Sir Henry Maxey of Great Saling
- 1608: Sir Roger Appleton, 1st Baronet, of South Benfleet
- 1609: Sir Thomas Mildmay
- 1610: Sir John Deane of Dynes Hall, Great Maplestead
- 1611: Sir Thomas Wiseman
- 1612: Sir Henry Lee (Leigh)
- 1613: Sir Robert Wroth of Loughton Hall died in office and replaced by Edward Elrington of Theydon Bois
- 1614: Sir Harbottle Grimston, 1st Baronet
- 1615: Sir William Smith, of Hill Hall
- 1616: Sir Thomas Lucas of St John's, nr Colchester
- 1617: Sir Paul Bayning
- 1618: Sir Thomas Bendish, 1st Baronet of Steeple Bumstead
- 1619: William Smith of Mounthall, Theydon, Essex.
- 1620: William Pearte (Pert) of Mountnessing
- 1621: Sir Stephen Soame of Heydon
- 1622: Sir Thomas Gourney (Gournay)
- 1623: Charles Pratt
- 1624: Sir Edward Boteler
- 1625: Sir Arthur Harris of Creeksea Place and Woodham Mortimer
- 1626: Hugh Everard
- 1627: Sir Thomas Nightingale, 1st Baronet
- 1628: Sir Henry Mildmay of Graces
- 1629: Edward Alleyn
- 1630: Sir Thomas Bendish, 1st Baronet
- 1631: Sir John Meade
- 1632: Henry Smith
- 1633: Sir Richard Saltonstall (Staltonstall) of South Ockendon
- 1634: Cranmer Harris of Cricksea
- 1635: Sir Humphrey Mildmay of Danbury
- 1636: Sir John Lucas
- 1637: Sir William Luckyn
- 1638: Sir William Wiseman, 1st Baronet of Great Canfield
- 1639: Martin Lumley
- 1640: Richard Luckaine (Luckyn) of Chignall Smealey
- 1641: Robert Smith of Upton, Stratford
- 1642: Sir Benjamin Ayloffe, 2nd Baronet of Great Braxsted
- 1643: Timothy Myddleton of Stansted
- 1644: Sir Richard Everard, 1st Baronet of Much Waltham
- 1645: Richard Harlackonden (Harlackenden) of Earls Colne
- 1646: John Pyett of Low Layton
- 1647: Hennamell Chabburn of Messing Died in office and replaced by Robert Bourne of Bovinger (Bobbingworth)
- 1648: George Pike of Baythorn
- 1649: Sir Samuel Tryon, 2nd Baronet of Halstead
- 1650: John Trafford
- 1651: Sir Thomas Abdy, 1st Baronet of Felix Hall
- 1652: Thomas Cambell of Clay Hall, Ilford
- 1653: Cuthbert Martin of Netteswell (or possibly Sir William Marten)
- 1654: Sir John Barrington, 3rd Baronet of Barrington Hall, Hatfield Broad Oak
- 1655: John Sparrowe (Sparrow) of Great Maplestead
- 1657: Thomas Middleton of Stansted Mountfitchet
- 1658: Sir Thomas Wiseman of Rivenhall (died in office and replaced by son Sir William Wiseman, 1st Baronet)
- 1659: Sir William Wiseman, 1st Baronet of Rivenhall
- 1660: Sir Robert Abdy or Abdye Bt of Stapleford
- 1661: Sir Benjamin Wright, Bt
- 1662: Sir Martin Lumley, Bt of Great Bardfield
- 1663: Sir Thomas Smith, 1st Baronet of Hill Hall
- 1664: Sir William Lucky (Luckyn) Bt of Messing
- 12 November 1665: Sir Heneage Fetherston, 1st Baronet
- 7 November 1666: Stephen Somes
- 6 November 1667: John Birch, of Giddy Hall
- 6 November 1668: Sir Thomas Garrard, 2nd Baronet
- 25 November 1668: Sir John James
- 11 November 1669: Sir Thomas Garrard, 2nd Baronet
- 4 November 1670: Edward Lewin
- 9 November 1671: Thomas Turner
- 11 November 1672: Henry Osbaldeston (John Howland rendered accounts for the whole year)
- 12 November 1673: Sir Thomas Chambers
- 5 November 1674: Sir Stephen White
- 15 November 1675: Sir Mark Guyon, of Dynes Hall, Great Maplestead
- 10 November 1676: John Morecroft
- 15 November 1677: Francis Osbaldeston
- 14 November 1678: Sir William Adams, 2nd Baronet
- 1 December 1678: William Palmer, of Stifford
- 13 November 1679: Sir Edward Smyth, 2nd Baronet, of Hill Hall, Theydon Mount
- 1682: Thomas Dawtry
- 1683: Sir William Glascock of Farnham (died in office)
- 1684: Sir William Hicks
- 1685: Joseph Smart
- 1686: Sir Cane James, 1st Baronet
- 1687: William Peeke
- 1688: Sir Thomas Manby
- 1689: Sir Thomas Middleton replaced by Sir John Marshall
- 1688: Sir Josiah Child, 1st Baronet
- 1690: John Lamotte Honywood of Marks Hall, Essex
- 1691: John Cooke
- 1692: George Ford
- 1693: John Austin
- 1693: Edward Ball
- 1693: Timothy Felton of Ovington
- 1694: John Locky
- 1694: John Little
- 1695: Edward Bullock
- 1696: Edward Bullock
- 1697: Edmund Godwin
- 1698: John Brand
- 1698: Sir Samuel Moyer, 1st Baronet
- 1699: Samuel Wake alias Jones
- 1700: George Pochin

=== 1701–1800 ===
- 1701: John Luther
- 1702: Robert Breedon
- 1703: Peter Whitcomb
- 1703: Edward Bullock
- 1703: Sir Thomas Webster, 1st Baronet of Copped Hall
- 1704: Erasmus Smith
- 1705: William Peck
- 1706: Dacre Barrets
- 1707: Herman (or John) Olmius
- 1708: Sir Daniel Wray of Little Britain
- 1709: Thomas Millington of Gosfield Hall, Essex
- 1710: Sir Henry Bendish, 4th Baronet
- 1711: Fisher Tench of The Great House, Low Leyton
- 1712: Carew Hervey Mildmay of Marks, Essex (died 1743)
- 1714: Sir Henry Fetherston, 2nd Baronet of Blakesware, Herts
- 1715: William Blackbourne
- 1716: William Cole
- 1717: David Gansell
- 1718: Robert Dennett
- 1719: William Lockey
- 1720: Hugh Raymond
- 1721: Timothy Brand of the Hide
- 1722: Richard Chamberlayne
- 1723: Josias Kinsman
- 1724: James Braine
- 1725: John Turner
- 1726: Edward Pearson
- 1727: Philip Hall, of Upton
- 1728: William Ashurst
- 1729: Catlin Thorogood
- 1730: John How of Stonedon
- 1731: William Peck
- 1732: Edward Holloway, of Walthamstow
- 1733: William Harvey of Chigwell
- 1734: Champion Branfill
- 1735: Samuel Symons Pepys of Great Yeldham
- 1736: William Dawtrey of Dodenhurst
- 1737: Herbert Trist of Cranham
- 1738: Hugh Smith of Weald
- 1739: Thomas Bowes of Upton
- 1740: Mark Wynne, of Warley
- 1740: Sir Thomas Drury, 1st Baronet of Wickham Hall, near Maldon
- 1741: Joshua Baker of Woodford replaced by James Hennat of Woodfordbridge
- 1742: Osmond Beavoir of Downham
- 1743: Edward Stephenson, of Barnfeild
- 1744: Thomas Ashurst of Henningham Castle
- 1745: Peter Du Cane of Coggeshall
- 1746: John Olmius of New Hall
- 1747: Nicholas Corsellis of Wivenhoe
- 1748: Bailey Heath of Stansted
- 1749: John Fishpool of Billericay
- 1750: Sir John Terril, Bt of Hernegate
- 1751: Peter Lessebure of Walthamstow
- 1752: Sir Edmund Allen of Little Leighs, Bt.
- 1753: William Hunt, of Woodford
- 1754: Richard Benion, of Giddy Hall
- 1755: Richard Chiswell, of Pebden
- 1756: Edward Emmet, of Alborough Hatch
- 1757: Humphry Bellamy, of Walthamstow
- 1758: Smart Lethieullier, of Little Illford
- 1758: Sir John Henniker, 2nd Baronet of Newton Hall
- 1759: James Kingsman of Stifford
- 1760: Thomas Tower of Weald House
- 1761: Sir Charles Smyth, 5th Baronet of Theydon Mount
- 1762: Richard Newman of West Ham
- 1763: William Sheldon of Walthamstow
- 1764: John Wilks of Wendon Lofts
- 1765: William Mildmay of Moulsham Hall
- 1766: Joseph Keeling of Fingringhoe
- 1767: Thomas Fitch, of Danbury
- 1768: Richard Lomas of Loughton
- 1769: Daniel Mathew of Felix Hall
- 1770: John Tyrell of Boreham
- 1771: Sir Charles Raymond, 1st Baronet of Valentine House, Barking
- 1772: Samuel Bosanquet of Walthamstow
- 1773: John Archer of Coopersale
- 1774: Henry Lovibond Collins of Boreham
- 1775: John Pardoe of Low Layton
- 1776: Richard Muilman Trench of Debden Hall
- 1777: Henry Sperling of Dines Hall
- 1778: William Lushington of Latton
- 1779: William Godfrey of Woodford
- 1780: Henry Hinde Pelley of Upton
- 1781: Richard Wyatt of Hornchurch
- 1782: William Dalby of Walthamstow
- 1783: John Godslave of Crosse, Baddow
- 1784: Robert Preston of Woodford
- 1785: George Bowles, of Wanstead
- 1786: John Jolliffe Tufnall of Great Waltham
- 1787: John Judd of Chelmsford
- 1788: Thomas Theophilus Cock of Messing
- 1789: Henry Merttins Bird, of Dagenham replaced by Thomas Fowell Buxton of Earls Colne
- 1790: Thomas Nottage of Bocking
- 1791: Donald Cameron of Ilford
- 1792: Zachariah Button of Stifford
- 1793: Staines Chamberlayne of Hatfield Broad Oak
- 1794: Richard Neave, later Sir Richard Neave, 1st Baronet of Dagnams Park replaced by James Hatch of Claybury
- 1795: John Hanson of Great Bromley
- 1796: Jackson Barwise of Marshalls
- 1797: William Manbey of Stratford
- 1798: John Perry of Moor Hall, Harlow
- 1799: Capel Cure of Blake Hall
- 1800: George Lee, of Great Ilford

=== 1801–1900 ===
- 12 February 1801: John Archer-Houblon, of Hallingbury Place
- 3 February 1802: Robert Raikes, of Great Ilford
- 3 February 1803: Stephen Fryer Gillum, of Shenfield
- 1 February 1804: William Palmer, of Nazeing
- 6 February 1805: James Reed, of Warleys
- 1 February 1806: James Urmston, of Chigwell
- 4 February 1807: William Mathew Raikes, of Walthamstow
- 3 February 1808: John Coggan, of Wanstead
- 6 February 1809: John Rutherford Abdy, of Albyns
- 31 January 1810: John Rigg, of Walthamstow
- 8 February 1811: Charles Smith, of Suttons
- 24 January 1812: Sir Robert Wigram, 1st Baronet, of Walthamstow House
- 10 February 1813: Richard John Brassey, of Great Ilford
- 4 February 1814: Robert Wilson, of Woodhouse
- 13 February 1815: Luke William Walford, of Little Bardfield
- 1816: Nicholas Pearce of Loughton
- 1817: John Hall of Woodford
- 1818: John Theophilus Danbur of Layton
- 1819: John Wilkes of Wendon Lofts
- 1820: Sir Thomas Neave, 2nd Baronet of Dagnam
- 1821: Robert Westley Hall the younger of Great Ilford
- 1822: Sir George Henry Smyth, 6th Baronet of Berechurch Hall
- 1823: John Jolliffe Tuffnell of Langleys
- 1824: Nathaniel Garland of Michaelstow Hall
- 1825: Peter Du Cane of Braxted Lodge
- 1826: Frederick Nassau of St Osyth
- 1827: Fiske Goodeve Fiske-Harrison of Copford Hall in Copford
- 1827: Sir John Tyrell, 1st Baronet
- 1828: Sir Charles Joshua Smith of Suttons
- 1829: Brice Pearse of Monkham in Woodford
- 1830: Capel Cure, of Blake Hall in Bobbingworth
- 1831: William Davis of Leyton
- 1832: John Thomas Selwin, of Down Hall in Hatfield Broad Oak
- 1833: Richard Birch Wolfe of Woodhall in Arksden
- 1834: John Round of Danbury Place
- 1835: George William Gent of Moyns Park, Steeple Bumstead
- 1836: William Whitaker Maitland of Loughton Hall
- 1837: Jonathan Bullock of Faulkborne Hall
- 1838: William Cotton, of Wallwood in Leyton
- 1839: John Fletcher Mills, of Lexden Park
- 1840: Christopher Thomas Tower, of Weald Hall
- 1841: John Archer Houblon, of Great Hallingbury Place
- 1842: John Faithful Fortescue, of Writtle Lodge
- 1843: Henry John Conyers, of Copped Hall
- 1844: Stanes Brocket Brocket, of Spains Hall
- 1845: George Round, of Colchester
- 1846: John Clarmont Whiteman, of the Grove, Theydon Garnon, Epping
- 1847: William Coxhead Marsh, of Park Hall, Theydon Garnon, Epping
- 1848: Beale Blackwell Colvin, of Monkham's Hall, Waltham Holy Cross
- 1849: Onley Savill Onley, of Stisted Hall
- 1850: Thomas Burch Western, of Felix Hall
- 1851: William Philip Honywood, of Marks Hall
- 1852: Sir Charles Smith, 3rd Baronet, of Suttons
- 1853: John Gurdon Rebow, of Wivenhoe Park
- 1854: Thomas White, of Weathersfield
- 1855: John Watlington Perry Watlington, of Moor Hall
- 1856: Robert Hills, of Colne Engaine
- 1857: John Francis Wright, of Kelvedon Hall
- 1858: Osgood Hanbury, of Holfield Grange, Coggeshall
- 1859: Champion Russell, of Upminster
- 1860: George Henry Errington, of Lexden Park, near Colchester
- 1861: George Alan Lowndes, of Barrington Hall, Hatfield Broad Oak
- 1862: Joseph Samuel Lescher, of Boyles Court, Brentwood
- 1863: George Palmer, of Nazeing
- 1864: Edgar Disney, of The Hyde, Ingatestone
- 1865: Sir Thomas Barrett-Lennard, 2nd Baronet, of Belhus
- 1866: Arthur Pryor of Hylands House
- 1867: Richard Wingfield-Baker, of Orsett Hall
- 1868: William Charles Smith, of Shortgrove, Saffron Walden
- 1869: John Wright, of Hatfield Priory, Hatfield
- 1870: John Jolliffe Tufnell, of Langleys, Great Waltham
- 1871: Robert Gosling, junior, of Hassobury, Farnham
- 1872: Thomas Kemble, of The Hall, Runwell
- 1873: Robert John Bagshaw, of Dovercourt
- 1874: Thomas George Graham White, of Wethersfield
- 1875: Sir Thomas Neville Abdy, 1st Baronet, of Albyns, Romford
- 1876: Christopher John Hume Tower, of Weald Hall, South Weald
- 1877: John-Robert Vaizey, of Attwoods, Halstead
- 1878: Philip John Budworth, of Greensted Hall, Ongar
- 1879: Edward Ind, of Coombe Lodge, Great Warley
- 1880: Andrew Johnston, of Woodford
- 1881: Thomas Jenner Spitty, of Billericayf
- 1882: Hector John Gurdon Rebow, of Wivenboe Park, Wivenhoe
- 1883: John Oxley Parker, of Woodham Mortimer Place, Woodham Mortimer
- 1884: Sir William Neville Abdy, 2nd Baronet
- 1885: Joseph Francis Lescher, of Hutton Park, near Brentwood
- 1886: Henry Ford Barclay, of Monkhams, Woodford
- 1887: John Lionel Tufnell-Tyrell, of Boreham House, Boreham
- 1888: Edward North Buxton, of Knighton, Woodford
- 1889: Sir William Bowyer-Smijth, 12th Baronet, of Hill Hall, Theydon Mount
- 1890: Richard Beale Colvin, of Felix Hall, Kelvedon
- 1891: Thomas Courtenay Theydon Warner, of Highams, Woodford Green
- 1892: William Swaine Chisenhale Marsh, of Gaynes Park, Epping
- 1893: Arthur Janison Evans, of Beech Hill Park, Waltham Abbey
- 1894: Horace George Egerton-Green, of King's Ford, Colchester
- 1895: Henry Joslin, of Gaynes Park, Upminster
- 1896: George Courtauld, of Cut Hedge, Halstead
- 1897: Edward Murray Ind, of Coombe Lodge, Great Warley
- 1898: Col. George Bramston Archer Houblon, of Hallingbury Place, Great Hallingbury
- 1899: Edward Kensit Norman, of Mistley Lodge, Manningtree
- 1900: Henry Collings Wells, of Broomfield Lodge, Broomfield

=== 1901–1973 ===
- 1901: Ernest James Wythes, of Copped Hall, Epping
- 1902: R. Cunliffe Gosling, of Hassobury, Farnham
- 1903: Col. Richard Percival Davis, of New House Farm, Walton-on-the-Naze
- 1904: James Noah Paxman, of Stisted Hall, Braintree
- 1905: Sir Thomas Buxton, Bt
- 1906: Christopher William Parker of Faulkbourne Hall, Faulkbourne, Witham
- 1907: Charles Ernest Ridley, of The Elms, Chelmsford
- 1908: William Nocton of Langham Hall, near Colchester
- 1909: John Henry Horton, of Mascalls, South Weald, Brentwood
- 1910: Ralph Frederic Bury, of St Leonards, Nazeing
- 1911: Reginald Duke Hill, of Holfield Grange, Coggeshall
- 1912: James Tabor, of The Lawn, Rochford
- 1913: Charles James Round, of Birch Hall, Colchester
- 1914: Henry Basham Dickinson, of "Le Mote," Pebmarsh
- 1915: Sir Drummond Cunliffe Smith, 4th Baronet of Buttons, Stapleford Tawney, Romford.
- 1916: Samuel Augustine Courtauld, of The Howe, Halstead
- 1917: Charles Edmund Gooch, of Wivenhoe Park, Colchester,
- 1918: Sir Frederick Green, of Hainault Lodge, Chigwell Row
- 1919: John James Dumville Botterell, of Colne Park, Earls Colne,
- 1920: Montagu Edward Hughes-Hughes, of Leez Priory, Hartford End, Chelmsford,
- 1921: William Julien Courtauld, of Penny Pot, Halstead,
- 1922: Lieut-Col. Francis Henry Douglas Charlton Whitmore, of Orsett Hall, Orsett
- 1923: Major Guy Gilbey Gold, of Abbots Hall, Shalford, Braintree.
- 1924: Lt.-Col. Sir Frederic Carne–Rasch, of Ingatestone Hall, Ingatestone
- 1925: Major Richard King Magor of Springfield Lyons, Springfield
- 1926: Lt.-Col. Eustace Hill, of Berwicks, Hatfield Peverel
- 1927: Major William Sullivan Gosling, of Hassobury, Bishop's Stortford.
- 1928: Sir Thomas Buxton, 5th Baronet, of Woodredon, Waltham Abbey
- 1929: Brigadier-General Kenneth John Kincaid-Smith, of St.Osyth's Priory, Clacton-on-Sea
- 1930: Brigadier-General John Tyson Wigan, of Danbury Park, Danbury, Chelmsford
- 1931: Major Nevill Arthur Charles de Hirzel Tufnell, of Langleys, Great Waltham, Essex.
- 1932: Harold McCorquodale, of Forest Hall, Ongar, Essex
- 1933: Major Herbert Leslie Melville Tritton, of Lyons Hall, GreatLeighs.
- 1934: Lt.-Col. Edward North Buxton, of Wallsgrave House, Loughton
- 1935: Lt.-Col. Frank Hilder, of Huskards, Ingatestone.
- 1936: Capt. Gerald Murray Strutt, of New House, Terling, Chelmsford.
- 1937: Major Forrester Colvin Watson, of Colne Ford House, White Colne
- 1938: Sir James Adam, of Colne Park, Earls Colne
- 1939: Col. Stuart Sidney Mallinson, of The White House, Woodford Green
- 1940: Major Wyndham Birch, of Beaumont Hall, Beaumont-cum-Moze, Thorpe-le-Soken, Essex
- 1941: Capt. John Kidston Swire, of Hubbards Hall, Harlow.
- 1942: Col. Richard Cecil Oxley Parker, of Houghton Lodge, Stockbridge, Hampshire
- 1943: Major Hubert Ashton, of Wealdside, South Weald, Brentwood
- 1944: Wing-Commander Denis Alfred Jex Buxton, of Wilderness House, Ongar
- 1945: Sir Adam Beattie Ritchie, of Boreham Manor, Boreham.
- 1946: William Whitmore Otter-Barry of Horkesley Hall, Little Horkesley, near Colchester.
- 1947: Brig.-General Claud Edward Charles Graham Charlton, of Great Canfield Park, Takeley.
- 1948: Lt.-Col. John Oxley Parker, of Queen's Road, Colchester
- 1949: Lt.-Col. Victor Alexander Gascoyne-Cecil of Downham House, Billericay.
- 1950: Lt.-Col. Vernon Stewart Laurie, of Old Vicarage, South Weald, Brentwood.
- 1951: Major George Nigel Capel-Cure, of Blake Hall, Ongar.
- 1952: Col. F. Collingwood Drake
- 1953: Augustine Courtauld of Spencers, Great Yeldham
- 1954: Lt.-Col. Philip Valentine Upton, of Park Lodge, Margaretting.
- 1955: Samuel Ranulph Allsopp, of Alsa Lodge, Stansted Mountfitchet
- 1956: Lt.-Col. James Gray Round, of Birch Hall, Colchester.
- 1957: Norman Selwyn Pryor of Manuden House, Bishop's Stortford.
- 1958: Lt.-Col. William Douglas Gosling, of Thrimley House, Farnham.
- 1959: Major Geoffrey Benyon Hoare, of Colville Hall, White Roding, Dunmow.
- 1960: Charles Hubert Archibald Butler of Shortgrove, Newport, Saffron Walden.
- 1961: Christopher William Oxley Parker
- 1962: Douglas Gurney Pelly
- 1963: Col. Hugh Edward Hunter Jones
- 1964: Brig. Edward Joseph Todhunter (Note: Brigadier Edward Joseph Todhunter (High Sheriff 1964-65), and Captain Guy Edward Ruggles-Brise (High Sheriff 1967-68), both served in the Second World War in the Army. They found themselves captured at different times during the ebb and flow of campaigns in North Africa. They ended up in the same Italian prisoner of war camp Vincigliata PG 12 a medieval castle near Florence. After the Italian armistice in September 1943 they both spent time with the Partisans in the Apennines and after many months together escaped reaching Allied lines in a leaking fishing boat in May 1944.)
- 1965: Andrew Hunter Carnwath
- 1966: Sir Nigel Edward Strutt
- 1967: Guy Ruggles-Brise
- 1968: Major N. N. Norman-Butler
- 1969: Richard Clive Butler
- 1970: Lt.-Col. Mark Frederic Strutt
- 1971: Allan James Vincent Arthur
- 1972: Aubrey Leland Oakes Buxton
- 1973: Gerald Colville Seymour Curtis

== List of high sheriffs ==
=== 1974–1999 ===
- 1974: Col. Richard George Judd
- 1975: Ronald Edward Tritton
- 1976: Lt.-Col. R. Wingate Collins-Charlton
- 1977: Edmund Hoyle Vestey
- 1978: Robert Peter Laurie
- 1979: Alastair Brian Clarke Harrison
- 1980: John Edward Tabor of Bovingdon Hall
- 1981: Gerald Anthony Charrington
- 1982: Col. Richard Bennett Gosling of Canterburys Lodge, Margaretting
- 1983: Hubert Gaitskell Ashton
- 1984: Peter Buchanan Lake
- 1985: David William Rushbrooke Evans
- 1986: Murray David Maitland Keddie
- 1987: Julius Arthur Sheffield Neave of Mill Green Park, Ingatestone
- 1988: Leonard F. Ratcliff of Pitchards, Halstead
- 1989: Leslie Alan Jordan of the Great Lodge, Great Bardfield, Chelmsford
- 1990: Peter Gavin Lee of Fanners, Great Waltham
- 1991: Michael William Clark of Braxted Park, Witham
- 1992: Alan George Tritton of Lyons Hall, Great Leighs, Chelmsford (Note: Alan George Tritton was formerly director of Barclays Bank. CBE June 1999 for services to Anglo-Indian relations & preservation of the cultural heritage. Married Clare McLaren-Throckmorton of Coughton Court, Warks., divorced.)
- 1993: Christopher Spencer Gosling
- 1994: Evelyn Bridgett Patricia Ward-Thomas of Horham Hall, Thaxted (Note: Evelyn Bridgett Patricia Ward-Thomas (High Sheriff 1994-95), the first female High Sheriff of Essex, is better known as the novelist Evelyn Anthony.)
- 1995: Christopher Ferens Pertwee
- 1996: Peter Thomas Thistlethwayte of East Donyland Hall, Colchester
- 1997: Robert Felix Erith of Shrubs Farm, Lamarsh, Bures
- 1998: Robin George Newman of Panfield Hall, Braintree
- 1999: George Ronald Capel-Cure of Blake Hall, Ongar

=== 2000–present ===
- 2000–2001: John Giles Selby Coode-Adams of Feeringbury Manor, Feering, Colchester
- 2001–2002: George Courtauld of Knights Farm, Earls Colne, Colchester
- 2002–2003: David Thomas Alan Boyle of Fairstead Hall, Terling, Chelmsford
- 2003–2004: Mark Treanor Thomasin-Foster of Moulsham Hall, Great Leighs, Chelmsford
- 2004–2005: Andrew Charles Streeter of Beggars Hall, Great Hallingbury, Bishops Stortford
- 2005–2006: Jennifer Mary Tolhurst
- 2006–2007: Christopher Dudley Stewart-Smith
- 2007–2008: Lady Diana Elisabeth Kemp-Welch
- 2008–2009: Sarah Francesca Courage of Brentwood
- 2009–2010: Rupert Seymour Gosling of Bush End, Takeley, Bishops Stortford
- 2010–2011: Michael William Hindmarch of Danbury
- 2011–2012: Lady Rosemary Elizabeth Ruggles-Brise of Finchingfield
- 2012-2013: Christopher David Palmer-Tomkinson of Colchester
- 2013-2014: Julia Mary Seton Abel Smith of Little Leighs
- 2014-2015: Nicholas S. Charrington of Layer Marney Tower, Colchester
- 2015-2016: Gerald Vincent Bodenham Thompson of Little Easton, Great Dunmow
- 2016–2017: Loma Jane Rolfe of Wearns Folly, Carmen Street, Great Chesterford, Saffron Walden
- 2017-2018: Simon Andrew Dalton Hall of Colchester
- 2018–2019: Bryan Robert Hardy Burrough of Ulting Wick
- 2019–2020: Dr Francis James Archibald Bettley of Great Totham, Maldon
- 2020–2021: Julie Ann Fosh of Chelmsford
- 2021–2022: Simon Robert Brice of Witham
- 2022–2023: Nicholas Kenneth Alston
- 2023–2024: Charles Richard Maurice Bishop
- 2024–2025: David Trevelyan Hurst of Great Wakering
- 2025–2026: Julie Ann Fosh, Chelmsford
- 2026–2027: Susannah Dutton, Hatfield Broad Oak

== Bibliography ==
- Hughes, A. (1898). List of Sheriffs for England and Wales from the Earliest Times to A.D. 1831. London: Eyre & Spottiswoode. (with amendments of 1963, Public Record Office)
