= Thomas Barrington (1530–1581) =

English politician (1530–1581)

Sir Thomas Barrington (1530–1581) was an English politician. He was knighted in 1571 and sat as member of the Parliament of England for Essex in 1572.

== Family and education ==
He was the only son of John Barrington of Hatfield Broad Oak by Elizabeth, daughter of Thomas Bonham, and succeeded his father in 1537. He was admitted to Gray's Inn in 1554. He married first Alice, daughter of Sir Henry Parker, Lord Morley (probably the 10th); they had a son, who predeceased him, and a daughter. In c. 1559 he married Winifred, daughter of Sir Henry Pole, Lord Montagu and widow of Sir Thomas Hastings; they had two sons, Francis and Henry, and a daughter.

== Offices held ==
Barrington was chief forester of Hatfield Forest, captain of levies in Hertfordshire in 1562, and sheriff of Essex and Hertfordshire in the same year. In Essex he was a commissioner of musters in 1563, for raising a benevolence in 1564, for the restraint of victuals in 1573 and for grain in 1579; he was a justice of the peace from 1564 and sheriff from 1580 to 1581.
