= William Swinburne =

William Swinburne may refer to:

- William Swinburne (locomotive builder) (1805–1883), American builder of steam locomotives
- Sir William Swinburne (died 1404), English member of parliament for Northumberland in 1395
- William Swinburne (Essex MP) (died 1422), English member of parliament for Essex in 1414
- William T. Swinburne (1847–1928), United States Navy admiral
