= FitzSymond =

FitzSymond is a surname. Notable people with the surname include:

- John FitzSymond (c. 1342–c. 1392), English politician
- James FitzSymond, List of Lord Mayors of Dublin

== See also ==
- Fitzsimmons
