= Gerald Curtis (disambiguation) =

Gerald Curtis may refer to:

- Gerald Curtis (born 1940), American academic and political scientist
- Gerald Curtis (sheriff), High sheriff of Essex
- Gerald Curtis (actor) (fl. 1961–1963), see The Daleks
