= John Lamotte Honywood =

English Member of Parliament and High Sheriff of Essex

John Lamotte Honywood (1647–1694) of Marks Hall, Essex was an English Member of Parliament and High Sheriff of Essex.

He was born the 2nd surviving son of Sir Thomas Honywood of Marks Hall, who had been a leading Parliamentary soldier during the Civil War, and educated at Christ's College, Cambridge (1665) and the Inner Temple (1668). He succeeded his brother in 1672.

He was elected as Member of Parliament for Essex in 1679, sitting until 1681. He was selected High Sheriff of Essex for 1679–80 and in the same year became a Gentleman of the Privy Chamber until his premature death. He also represented Essex in Parliament a second time from 1693 until his death.

He died by suicide in 1694 after several unsuccessful previous attempts. He had married Elizabeth, the daughter and heiress of Sir William Wiseman, 1st Baronet, of Rivenhall, Essex, but left no children. His widow remarried Sir Isaac Rebow, after which Marks Hall passed to John's cousin Robert Honywood, MP of Charing, Kent.
