= Robert Rochester =

Member of the Parliament of England (c. 1494–1557)

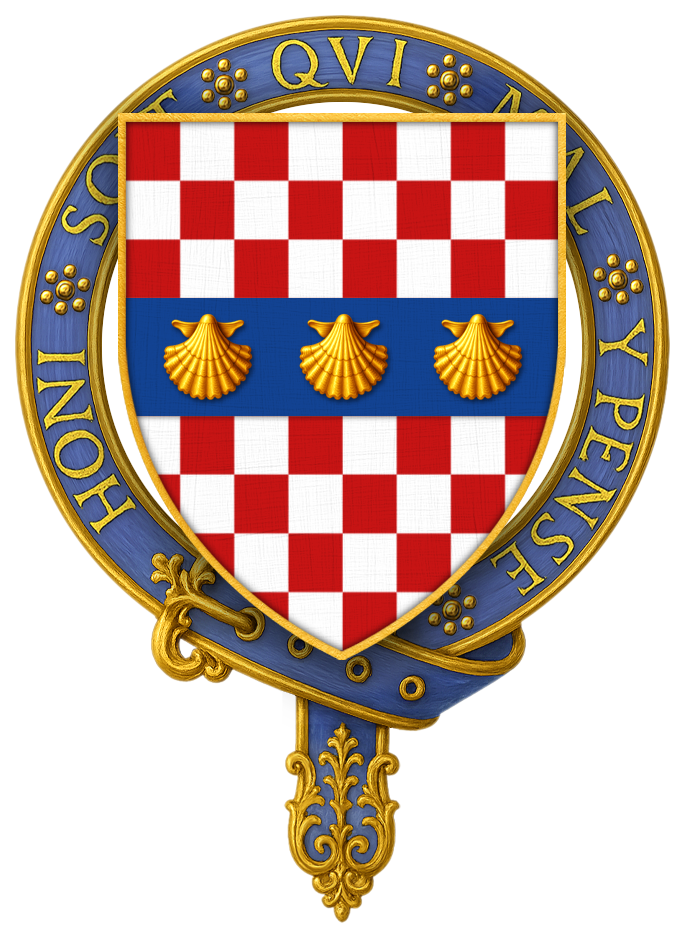
Arms of Robert Rochester

Robert Rochester (c. 1494 – 28 November 1557) was an English Catholic and Comptroller of the Household and a member of the Privy Council in the reign of Mary I.

== Family ==
Rochester's family were "minor Essex gentry" associated with the Earls of Oxford. According to Ross, Robert Rochester was Comptroller of the Household to John de Vere, 13th Earl of Oxford, at a fee of £10 per year, from about 1495 until his death in 1508.

Robert Rochester was born at Terling, Essex, the third son of John Rochester and Grisold Writtle, daughter of Walter Writtle of Bobbingworth. Grisold Writtle's sister, Eleanor, married James Walsingham, and was the mother of Edmund Walsingham, Lieutenant of the Tower of London.

Rochester's younger brother, John Rochester, was a Carthusian priest and martyr who was executed in York in May 1537, and beatified in 1888.

== Career ==
According to Hughes, by 1542 Rochester had been appointed receiver to John de Vere, 16th Earl of Oxford, and was also appointed bailiff of the Earl's manor of Lavenham in Suffolk. By 1551, Rochester had been appointed Comptroller of the Household to Mary Tudor, Henry VIII's elder daughter by Catherine of Aragon. In that year, the Privy Council ordered Rochester to stop any priest from saying Mass in the Princess's household; Rochester refused, and was imprisoned in the Tower (according to the National Archives he was imprisoned in the Fleet).

Mary complained in August 1551 that she had been required to account the household expenses, but her parents had not "brought her up with baking and brewing". She also insisted that she would appoint any successor to Rochester rather than the Privy Council. Mary wanted Rochester to be re-instated. The replacement Comptroller was Anthony Wingfield. The next year, Rochester was released to retire due to his health. He was soon allowed to resume his post as Comptroller.

When the Princess assumed the throne as Mary I, she rewarded Rochester for his faithful service, making him Chancellor of the Duchy of Lancaster and appointing him to the inner circle of the Privy Council. He served as a Member of Parliament for Essex from 1553 to 1555.

Rochester was appointed to the Order of the Garter, but died before he could be installed as a member.

== Death ==
Rochester died, unmarried, on 28 November 1557. William Rochester, Robert's older brother, received a third of his lands.

Robert Rochester was buried on 4 December at the Charterhouse at Sheen, the house reconstituted by the remnant of the English Carthusians under Maurice Chauncy. He was succeeded in his post as Chancellor of the Duchy of Lancaster by his nephew, Edward Waldegrave (died 1 September 1561), son of John Waldegrave (died 1543) and Rochester's sister Lora (died c. 1545).
