= John Deane (MP) =

English politician

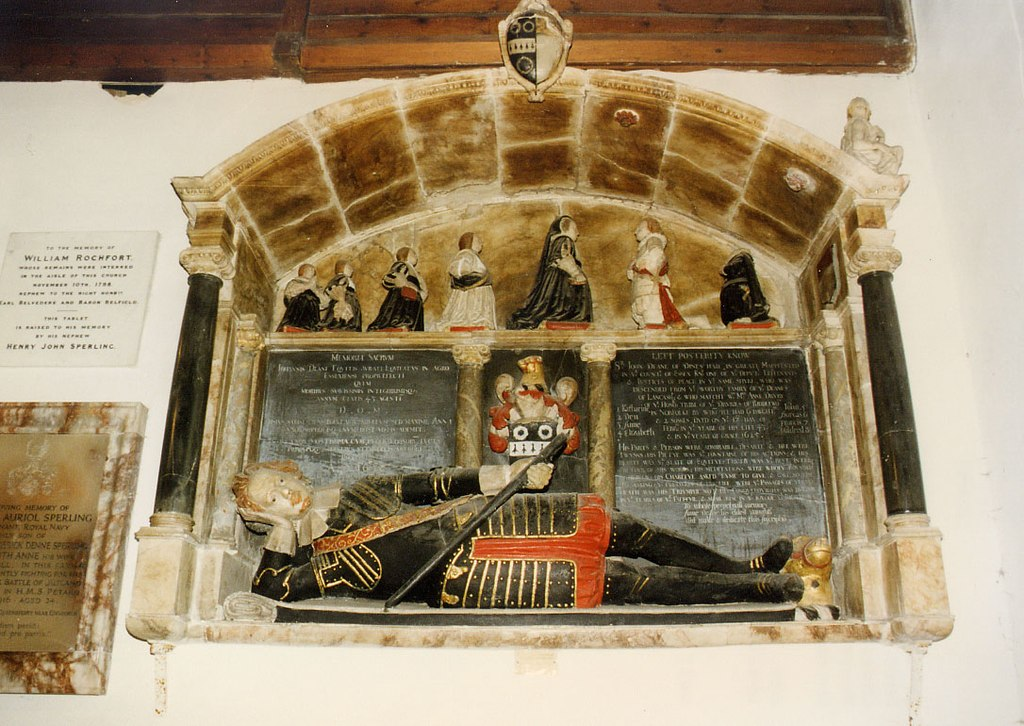
Monument with semi-recumbent effigy of Sir John Deane in Great Maplestead Church, Essex

Deane of Dyne's Hall arms: Sable a Fess Ermine between three Chaplets Argent

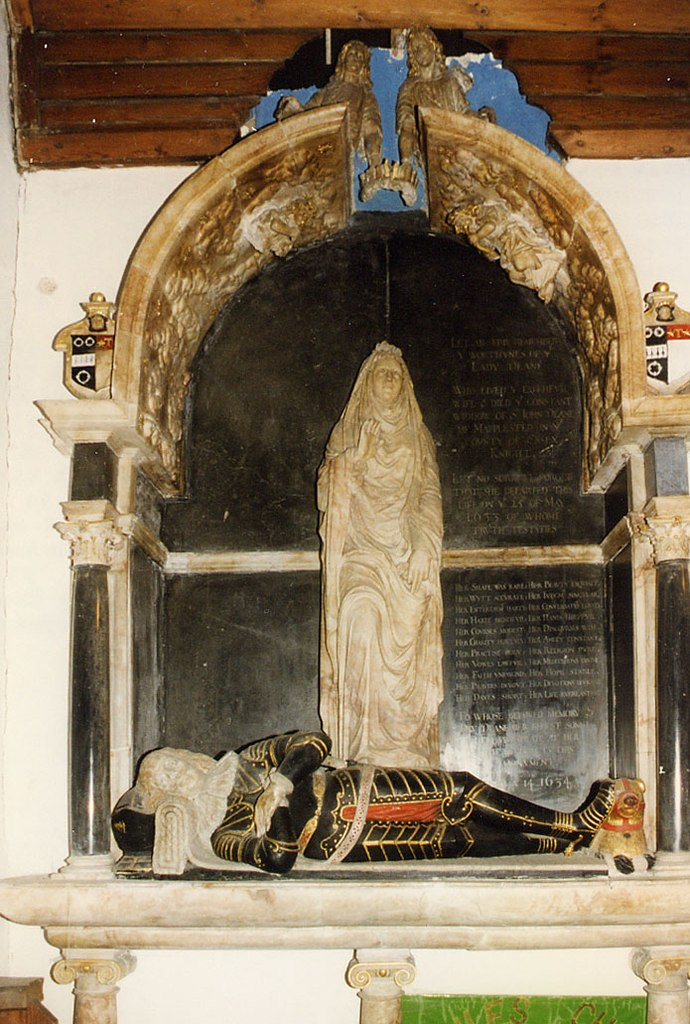
Monument in Great Maplestead Church, of Anne Drury (wife of Sir John Deane), with her standing effigy dressed in a burial shroud. Erected by her son, Sir Dru Deane, who as the inscription states, lies "prostrate at her feete"

Sir John Deane (1583 – 17 February 1626) of Dyne's Hall in the parish of Great Maplestead in Essex, was an English politician who sat in the House of Commons from 1621 to 1622.

== Origins ==
Deane was the only son of William Deane (d. 1585) of Dyne's Hall, Great Maplestead, Essex, by his second wife Anne Egerton, a daughter of Thomas Egerton of London, merchant, and widow of George Blyth, MP (d. 1581), Secretary to the Council of the North.

William Deane, "a younger son of Lancashire stock", had been the steward and third husband of Anne Wentworth (1537–1580) (Lady Maltravers), one of the three daughters and co-heiresses of Sir John Wentworth of Gosfield Hall in Essex, and the widow successively of Sir Hugh Rich (a son of Richard Rich, 1st Baron Rich) and then of Henry FitzAlan, Lord Maltravers (1538–1556), son and heir apparent of Henry FitzAlan, 12th Earl of Arundel. In 1575 William Deane acquired and rebuilt Dyne's Hall (Called "Deane Hall" on the monument of his son's father-in-law), near Gosfield Hall, and lived there after his first wife's death, when he remarried to Anne Egerton, the widow of George Blythe, Clerk of the Council of the North in 1572, and a younger daughter of Thomas Egerton, Citizen and Mercer of the City of London, who "claimed to be descended from the Egertons of Wrinehill in Cheshire". Her brother was Stephen Egerton, the Puritan preacher of St Anne’s in the Blackfriars.

== Career ==
Deane matriculated at Brasenose College, Oxford on 24 October 1595, aged 12 and was awarded BA on 8 November 1600. In 1600, he became a law student at Lincoln's Inn. Knighted on 11 May 1603, he was a Justice of the Peace for Essex from 1607 until his death being appointed High Sheriff of Essex for 1610/11. In 1621, he was elected as a Member of Parliament for Essex. Deane died at the age of about 42 and was interred in Great Maplestead Church, where survives his mural monument with recumbent effigy dressed in full armour.

== Marriage and issue ==
Deane married Anne Drury (d. 1633), second daughter of Sir Drue Drury (c. 1531 – 1617), of Riddlesworth Hall in Norfolk, a courtier and Member of Parliament, by whom he had 2 sons and 6 daughters. He is mentioned on the inscribed monument of Sir Drue Drury in Riddlesworth Church, marshalled with Deane. His wife's monument with standing effigy survives in Great Maplestead Church, inscribed as follows:

Lady Deane, who lived ye faithful wife and dyed ye constant widow of Sir John Deane, of Gt Maplestead, in ye County of Essex, Knight. Let no sorrowe forget that she departed this life on ye 25th May, 1633. Her Shape w as rare, her Beauty exquisite, Her Wytte accurate, Her Judgment singular. Her Entertainment hearty, Her Conversation lovely, Her Heart merciful, Her Hand helpful, Her courses modest, Her discourses wise, Her Charity heavenly, Her Amity constant, Her Practise holy, Her Religion pure, Her vowes Laweful, Her Meditations divine, Her faythe unfeigned, Her Hope stable, Her Prayers devout, Her Devotion diurnal, Her dayes short, Her Life eternal. To whose beloved memory Sir Dru Deane, her eldest son, Here prostrate at her feet, erects This Monument April 14, 1634.

Parliament of England
Preceded by Sir Robert Rich; Sir Richard Weston	Member of Parliament for Essex; 1621; With: Sir Francis Barrington, 1st Baronet	Succeeded by Sir Francis Barrington, 1st Baronet; Sir Thomas Cheek
