= Thomas Tresham (speaker) =

English politician, soldier and administrator (died 1471)

Sir Thomas Tresham (died 6 May 1471) was an English politician, soldier and administrator. He was the son of Sir William Tresham and his wife Isabel de Vaux, daughter of Sir William Vaux of Harrowden. Thomas's early advancement was due to his father's influence. In 1443 he and his father were appointed as stewards to the Duchy of Lancaster's estates in Northamptonshire, Buckinghamshire, Bedfordshire and Huntingdonshire, and by 1446 Thomas was serving as an esquire for Henry VI, being made an usher of the king's chamber in 1455. He was appointed a Justice of the Peace for Huntingdonshire in 1446, a position he held until 1459, and was returned to Parliament for Buckinghamshire in 1447 and Huntingdonshire in 1449. Despite the Tresham family's close links with the royal court they were also on good terms with Richard Plantagenet, 3rd Duke of York, and when he returned from Ireland in 1450 Tresham and his father went to greet him. Shortly after leaving home on 23 September they were attacked by a group of men involved in a property dispute with his father; William Tresham was killed, and Thomas was injured.

After recovering from his injuries he again began to take government appointments; he was High Sheriff of Cambridgeshire and Huntingdonshire between 1451 and 1452, a justice of the peace between 1452 and 1460 for Northamptonshire and a Member of Parliament in 1453 for Northamptonshire. Tresham stayed in favour throughout the disturbances of 1456, and was again made High Sheriff of Cambridgeshire and Huntingdonshire between 1457 and 1458, and for Sussex and Surrey between 1458 and 1459. He was returned to parliament in 1459 for Northamptonshire again, and the parliament, packed with anti-Yorkists, chose him to act as Speaker of the House of Commons. After the Parliament ended he was appointed to various anti-Yorkist commissions of Oyer and terminer, followed by an appointment as Comptroller of the Household in 1460.

He fought at the Battle of Northampton in 1460, but denied having been at the Battle of Wakefield, an odd thing for a Lancastrian. He joined up with Margaret of Anjou in January 1461 and fought at the Second Battle of St Albans, where he was knighted. He fought at the Battle of Towton and was captured; despite being one of the lords on whom Edward IV had placed a £100 bounty, he only suffered forfeiture. He secured a pardon in 1464 and again represented Northamptonshire in Parliament in 1467, but failed to regain his lands and possessions. As a result, he took part in the plots of John de Vere, 13th Earl of Oxford, and was imprisoned in the Tower of London from 1468 until Henry VI regained the throne in 1470. He was rewarded for his services and loyalty with various grants, including that of Huntingdon Castle, to be held for seven years.

After the Battle of Barnet he fled to meet Margaret of Anjou but was captured and executed on 6 May 1471.

His children by Mary, daughter of William, Lord Zouche of Harringworth, included a son, John, who was born in 1462. John was restored to his father's estates after the reversal of the attainder by Henry VII in 1485. John's son was Sir Thomas Tresham (d.1559). A daughter, Isabella, was born in 1460 and married Sir Henry de Vere of Addington, thus establishing a long line of descendants.

== Bibliography ==
Lock, Julian. "Tresham, Thomas". Oxford Dictionary of National Biography (online ed.). Oxford University Press. doi:10.1093/ref:odnb/27710. (Subscription, Wikipedia Library access or UK public library membership required.)

Parliament of England
Preceded by Unknown	Member for Buckinghamshire; 1447	Succeeded by Unknown
Preceded by Unknown	Member for Huntingdonshire; 1449	Succeeded by Unknown
Preceded by Unknown	Member for Northamptonshire; 1453	Succeeded by Unknown
Preceded by Unknown	Member for Northamptonshire; 1459	Succeeded by Unknown
Honorary titles
Preceded by Unknown	High Sheriff of Cambridgeshire and Huntingdonshire; 1451–1452	Succeeded by Unknown
Preceded by Unknown	High Sheriff of Cambridgeshire and Huntingdonshire; 1457–1458	Succeeded by Unknown
Preceded by Unknown	High Sheriff of Sussex; 1458–1459	Succeeded by Unknown
Preceded by Unknown	High Sheriff of Surrey; 1458–1459	Succeeded by Unknown
Political offices
Preceded by Sir John Wenlock	Speaker of the House of Commons; 1459	Succeeded by John Green
