= Tryon baronets =

Extinct baronetcy in the Baronetage of England

The Tryon Baronetcy, of Layer Marney in the County of Essex, was a title in the Baronetage of England. It was created on 28 March 1620 for Samuel Tryon. He was the grandson of Peter Tryon, who had emigrated to England from the Low Countries and whose son had bought Layer Marney and Bois Hall, near Brentwood. The second baronet was High Sheriff of Essex for 1649, who was briefly succeeded by his son of the same name, who was in turn succeeded by his half-brother Samuel John. The title became extinct on the death of the latter in 1724. The family seat was Bois Hall.

== Tryon baronets, of Layer Marney (1620) ==
Escutcheon of the Tryon baronets of Layer Marney

- Sir Samuel Tryon, 1st Baronet (died 1627)
- Sir Samuel Tryon, 2nd Baronet (1615–1665)
- Sir Samuel Tryon, 3rd Baronet (died 1672)
- Sir Samuel John Tryon, 4th Baronet (died 1724)
