= Vernon Stewart Laurie =

- Born: 23 February 1896; Chelsea, London, England
- Died: 29 January 1981 (aged 84); Brentwood, England
- Occupations: Stockbroker and Territorial Army Officer
- Awards: CBE; TD

Colonel Vernon Stewart Laurie CBE TD DL (23 February 1896 – 29 January 1981) was an English stockbroker who also served as a territorial army officer in both World Wars. He was also Deputy Lieutenant of Essex in 1946 and High Sheriff of Essex in 1950.

== Early life ==
Laurie was born on 23 February 1896 in the Chelsea area of London, the son of Ronald Laurie and his wife Florence. He was educated at Eton College and Christ Church, Oxford.

== Territorial Army ==
Laurie was a Royal Artillery officer in the Territorial Army serving in France, Egypt and Palestine during the First World War. During the Second World War he was officer commanding 147th (Essex Yeomanry) Regiment, Royal Horse Artillery, 107th Light Anti-Aircraft Regiment, RA and 22nd Light Anti-Aircraft Regiment, RA serving in North Africa, Malta and Italy. After his war service he became an Honorary Colonel of the Essex Yeomanry.

== Stockbroker ==
Laurie had been a member of the Stock Exchange since 1921. He later became Chairman of the British Empire Securities & General Trust; Laurie was also Master of the Worshipful Company of Saddlers in the 1950s. On 29 June 1946 Laurie was appointed a Deputy Lieutenant for Essex. He was also appointed High Sheriff of Essex in 1950.

== Honours and awards ==
- 21 September 1944 awarded the Territorial Army Efficiency Decoration (TD).
- 28 June 1945 was appointed an Officer of the Order of the British Empire (OBE) in recognition of gallant and distinguished services in Italy.
- 12 May 1951 awarded a 2nd Clasp to the Territorial Army Efficiency Decoration.
- 31 December 1963 Laurie was promoted to a Commander of the Order of the British Empire (CBE) for political services in Essex.
