= Richard Baynard =

English politician (died 1434)

Arms of Baynard: Sable, a fess between two chevrons, or

Richard Baynard (c. 1371 – 7 January 1434) was an English administrator, MP and Speaker of the House of Commons of England in 1421.

He was the fourth son and heir of Thomas Baynard of Messing in Essex by his wife Katherine.

He was elected Knight of the shire (MP) for Essex six times (1406, Nov 1414, Dec 1421, 1423, 1427 and 1433). and elected Speaker of the House in Dec 1421.

He was Controller, customs and subsidies Ipswich, Suffolk (1407–1408) and Keeper of Colchester gaol, Essex before March 1417.

He died in 1434. He had married four times. Firstly Joan, secondly Joyce, daughter and heiress of John Vyne, a London draper thirdly another Joan, daughter and heiress of John Sandherst, a London chandler, and fourthly Grace, daughter of John Burgoyne, and widow of John Peyton of Easthorpe, Essex with whom he had two sons and four daughters.

By his fourth wife, Grace Burgoyne, he had the two sons Richard Baynard, Esq., and Lewis Baynard, and two daughters who survived him, Elizabeth, the wife of Thomas Bray, and Margaret, the wife of John Knyvet, Esquire. He also had a natural son, John Baynard. His widow Grace died on 6 May 1439.

His son and heir Richard Baynard had two children: Richard Baynard, who died young, and Grace (d. 1508), who became his sole heiress and married twice. Firstly to Thomas Langley, before her father's decease, and secondly to Edmund Danyell, Esq., son of Sir Thomas Danyell, 'baron of Rathwire, in Ireland, and lord deputy there,' under King Edward IV, by Margaret, his wife, sister to John Howard, Duke of Norfolk.

Political offices
Preceded by Thomas Chaucer	Speaker of the House of Commons; 1421–1422	Succeeded by Roger Flower
