= William Coggeshall =

English politician

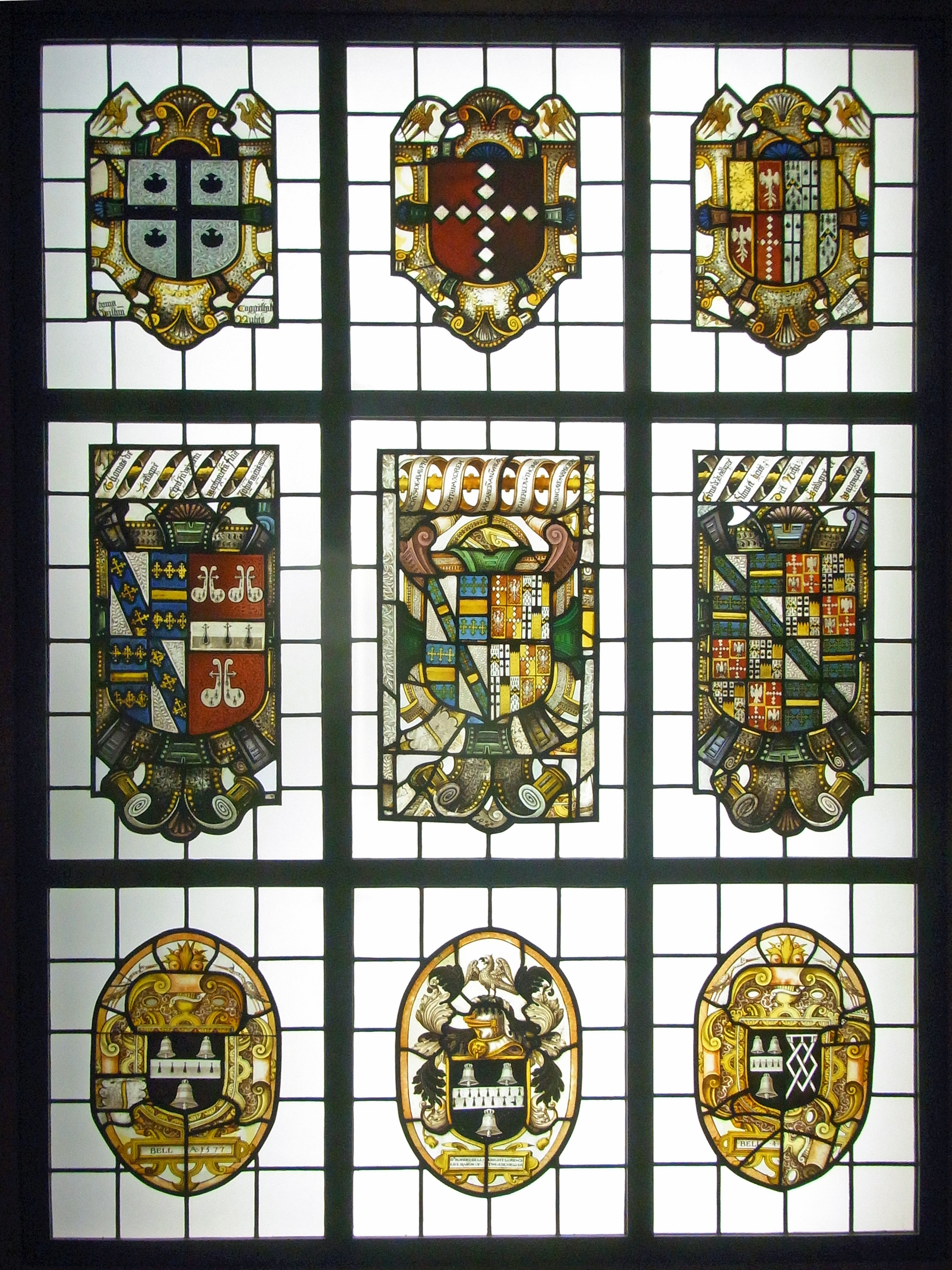
- Beaupré Hall heraldic stained glass, c.1570, Victoria and Albert Museum, showing (top left and quartered) the arms of Sir William Coggeshall Argent, a cross between four escallops sable, inscribed in Latin: Arma Willi(el)m(i) Coggeshall Militis ("arms of William Coggeshall, Knight")

Parliament of England

Personal details
- Born: 1358
- Died: 1426 (aged 67–68)
- Occupation: politician

Sir William Coggeshall (1358–1426), of Codham Hall and Coggeshall, Essex, was an English politician.

== Life ==
Coggeshall was born in Codham Hall on 20 July 1358. He was the son of Sir Henry Coggeshall (d. 1375) and Joan Welle, the daughter and heiress of Sir William Welle of Great Sampford, Essex and Well Hall in Exning, Suffolk. Coggeshall was the nephew of the MP, Thomas Coggeshall.

Coggeshall married, before March 1379 in Milan, Antiocha Hawkwood, a daughter of Sir John Hawkwood of Sible Hedingham, Essex by his first wife. They had one son and four daughters.

His second wife was Ricarda Inkpen (died September 1390), daughter and heiress of John Inkpen of Inkpen, Berkshire. She was the widow of William Huish of Huish, Devon and of Sir Thomas Fichet of Spaxton, Somerset. Before May 1394, he married for a third time, to a woman named Margaret.

== Career ==
Coggeshall was knighted by March 1379. He was elected a Member of Parliament for Essex 1391, January 1397, 1401, 1402, October 1404, 1411, April 1414, 1420, December 1421 and 1422.

He was appointed Sheriff of Essex for 1392, 1405 and 1412. In 1381 he was one of the commissioners appointed to suppress the Peasants' Revolt. He was a Justice of the Peace for Essex in 1401–1407, 1417–1419 and 1422–1426.
