= John Doreward =

English politician (died 1420)

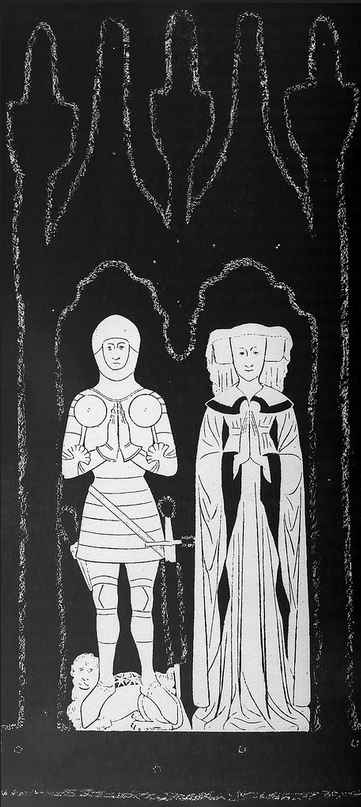
Monumental brass to John Doreward and his third wife Isabella Baynard, St Mary's Church, Bocking, Essex

John Doreward (died 1420) was a Serjeant-at-law and Speaker of the House of Commons of England.

== Early life ==
Outside the affairs of parliament, little is known of Doreward. He was apparently the son of William Doreward of Bocking, Essex who was a member of parliament for Essex in the eighteenth and twentieth parliaments of Edward III. According to James Alexander Manning, he was "of Dorewood Hall", and the name survives in 'Durward's', at Bocking in Essex and in 'Durward's Hall', between Witham and Kelvedon. At Bocking, he founded a chantry in 1397.

== Marriages ==
He married Blanche Coggeshall, daughter and heiress of William Coggeshall (1358–1426), High Sheriff of Essex. His second wife was Isabella Baynard of Messing, as named "Isabella" on his monument in St Mary's Church, Bocking, a daughter of Richard Baynard. He had at least one son, John Doreward, who in 1440 founded an almshouse to be called the Maison Dieu of the town of Bocking, and later known as the Hospital of Bocking. Among its purposes was to pray for the soul of John Doreward, the founder's father.

== Political life ==
Doreward was appointed High Sheriff of Essex and Hertfordshire for 1399 and elected knight of the shire (MP) six times for Essex (1395, Jan 1397, 1399, Jan 1404, May 1413 and April 1414). He was elected Speaker of the House in 1399 and 1413.

The Constitutional History of England in its Origin and Development, vol. III, p. 18 ... In the case of Sir John Cheyne, the Speaker elected in 1399, the excuse of ill-health was accepted by the king as valid; the clergy had in fact objected to the nomination; Sir John Cheyne withdrew, and John Doreward was chosen in his place.

The chronicler Robert Fabyan, writing about a hundred years after Doreward's first election as Speaker, gives a more obscure version of events:

Than this feest with all honoure endyd, upon the morn beyinge Tuysday, the Parlyament was agayne begunne, and upon Wedneysdaye Syr John Cheyney, yt. before that tyme had occupyed as Speker of that Parlyament, by his owne laboure, for cause of such infyrmyties as he tha had, was dyschargyd, and a Squyer named Wyllyam Durwarde was electe to that roume for hym.

The Parliament was almost identical in makeup to the previous parliament held under Richard II, where thanks to the political manoeuvring of Sir John Bussy many of Parliament's powers had been stripped from them and given instead to a committee. The summoning of this parliament showed good political judgement on the part of the de facto king, Henry IV; in the words of Manning "[Henry] could not have hoped to assemble a body of legislators less favourable to the captive monarch"

The Commons voted a large subsidy to pay for the war against Scotland and the defence of Ireland and Calais in the hopes that their requests for additional powers would be granted. The commons also voted for the arrest of William Scrope and Henry Green, both councillors of Richard II.

Doreward was again made Speaker of the House of Commons for the parliament of 1413; this was the first of Henry V, and he was appointed again apparently after his predecessor had resigned from ill-health. The parliament of 1413 granted Henry V a subsidy for four years; an unusually long period, this is understood to be explained by the new king's popularity.

Some historians have assumed that the John Doreward (or Dorewood) in the parliaments of 1399 and 1413 were father and son, but they are evidently the same person; the Speaker of the House of Commons in both cases was a serjeant-at-law, which was not an appointment held by either of Dorewood's sons.

He was appointed a member of Henry IV's council from Nov 1399 to May 1406.

== Monument ==
Doreward is commemorated by a monumental brass in St Mary's Church, Bocking, on the floor before the South Chapel. This gives the year of his death as 1420 and names his second wife as Isabella. Inscribed in Latin: Exoretur mia(?) Dei p(ro) a(n)i(m)a(e) Joh(ann)is Doreward Armig(e)r(i) filii Will(ielm)i Doreward qui obi(i)t xii die mensis Novem(bris) An(no) D(omi)ni MCCCCXX et pro a(n)i(m)a Isabell(a)e ux(or)is eius quor(um) a(n)i(m)ab(us)z p(ro)pi(t)et(ur) Deus ("Pray to God for the soul of John Doreward, Esquire, son of William Doreward who died on the 12 day of November AD 1420 and for the soul of Isabella his wife on the sould of whom may God look with favour")

== Arms ==
Coat of arms of John Doreward
Escutcheon Ermine on a chevron Sable three crescents Or.

Political offices
Preceded by Sir John Cheney	Speaker of the House of Commons; 1399	Succeeded by Sir Arnold Savage
Preceded by William Stourton	Speaker of the House of Commons; 1413	Succeeded by Sir Walter Hungerford
