= Robert Honywood (Essex MP) =

English politician

Member of Parliament for Essex
- In office 1716–1727 Serving with Richard Child, 3rd Baronet (1716–1722); William Harvey (1722–1727)
- Preceded by: William Harvey
- Succeeded by: Richard Child, Viscount Castlemaine; Sir Robert Abdy, 3rd Baronet

Vice-admiral of Essex
- In office 1716–1735
- Preceded by: Thomas Middleton
- Succeeded by: James Waldegrave, 1st Earl Waldegrave

Personal details
- Born: Bef. 1676
- Died: January 1735
- Party: Whigs
- Spouse: Mary Sandford
- Children: Richard, Charles, John, Philip, Mary
- Relatives: Sir Philip Honywood (brother); Sir Robert Honywood (grandfather)

Robert Honywood (bef. 1676 – January 1735) was an English politician who sat in the House of Commons as Member of Parliament (MP) for Essex between 1716 and 1727. He served as vice-admiral of Essex from 1715 until his death in 1735.

Honywood was the first son of Charles Ludovic Honywood and Mary Clement; his brother was Sir Philip Honywood. He was also the grandson of Sir Robert Honywood, MP for New Romney, and a direct descendant of Mary Honywood.

A Whig, Honywood was elected Member of Parliament (MP) for Essex in 1716 after the result of the by-election in 1715 was reversed on petition, and held the seat until 1727.

Honywood married Mary Sandford, daughter of Sir Richard Sandford, 2nd Baronet, and sister of Sir Richard Sandford, 3rd Baronet. He inherited the Marks Hall estate from his distant cousin John Lamotte Honywood upon the remarriage of his widow. He had several children, including Richard, who inherited the estate, and Philip, who inherited the estate following the death of Richard's son, Richard.

== See also ==
- Honywood
