= John Green (speaker) =

English politician (1400–1473)

John Green (c. 1400–1 May 1473) was Speaker of the House of Commons of England in October 1460.

He was the son of John Green of Widdington, Essex and was trained as a lawyer in Gray's Inn.

He married Agnes, daughter of John Duke of Widdington Hall, Essex. They later made the hall their own home.

He was elected to Parliament in 1455 as knight of the shire for Essex. He was retained as a lawyer by the Duchy of Lancaster but, following the lead of his patron, Viscount Bourchier, he went over to the Yorkist side. In the autumn of 1460 he was elected to Parliament for Essex for the second time and elected Speaker of the House.

In early 1462 Green and his brother were granted the stewardship of the estates in Essex, Cambridgeshire and Suffolk which had belonged to the John de Vere, 12th Earl of Oxford, recently executed for treason. In 1467, he attended a meeting of the king's council, and in 1469 he was appointed deputy to Richard Neville, 16th Earl of Warwick, the chief steward of the duchy of Lancaster.

On his death in 1473 he was buried at Gosfield, Essex. His heirs were his daughters Agnes and Margaret; a third daughter became abbess of Dartford Priory.

Political offices
| Preceded by Thomas Tresham | Speaker of the House of Commons; 1460 | Succeeded by James Strangeways |
