= John Wood (speaker) =

English politician (died 1484)

Sir John Wood (died 20 August 1484) was Speaker of the House of Commons of England between January 1483 and February 1483.

He was probably born in Sussex, the son of another John Wood.

In 1444, he began a long career in the Treasury, holding the offices of under-treasurer of the exchequer (1452–1453 and 1480–1483), Keeper of the Great Wardrobe of the Household (c. 1458–1460), and Treasurer of the Exchequer (1483–1484).

He was appointed High Sheriff of Sussex and Surrey for 1475 and was elected knight of the shire for Sussex in 1449-50, for Surrey in 1460-61, Sussex in 1472-75, Surrey in 1478 and January 1483. During the latter Parliament, he was elected speaker of the house for a brief period in 1483, after which he was knighted. He may also have served in the 1484 Parliament.

He died in 1484. He had married twice: firstly Elizabeth, daughter and coheir of John Michell, Lord Mayor of London, and widow of the former royal physician Thomas Morstede, and secondly Margery, daughter of Sir Roger Lewkenor of Trotton in Sussex. He had no children.

Political offices
Preceded by James Strangeways	Speaker of the House of Commons; 1483	Succeeded by William Catesby
Preceded by Henry Bourchier	Lord High Treasurer; 1483–1484	Succeeded by John Tuchet
