= John Gates (courtier) =

English courtier, soldier and politician

Sir John Gates KB
- Born: 1504
- Died: 22 August 1553 (aged 48–49); Tower Hill, London
- Cause of death: Decapitation
- Resting place: St Peter ad Vincula, London
- Known for: Soldier and courtier
- Spouse: Mary Denny
- Parent(s): Sir Geoffrey Gates; Elizabeth Clopton

Sir John Gates KB (1504 – 22 August 1553) was an English courtier, soldier and politician, holding influential household positions in the reigns of Henry VIII and Edward VI. As one of the Chief Gentlemen of the Privy Chamber under Edward VI, he became a follower of John Dudley, 1st Duke of Northumberland and was a principal participant in the attempt to establish Lady Jane Grey on the English throne. Because of this, he was executed for high treason under Mary I.

== Serving Henry VIII and Edward VI ==
Originating from an ancient Essex gentry family going back to King Edward III, John Gates had a thorough training as a lawyer at Lincoln's Inn. He married Mary Denny, sister of Sir Anthony Denny and Joyce Denny, and served Queen Catherine Parr from 1543 to 1545. He was first a member of King Henry VIII's Privy Chamber as a groom in 1542. From 1546 he was in charge, with his brother-in-law, of the King's personal finances and his "dry stamp", a substitute, for the King's convenience, for Henry's "sign manual" or personal signature. These positions of trust implied considerable influence.

In December 1546, Gates was one of three commissioners (along with Sir Richard Southwell and Wymond Carew) sent to confiscate and make an inventory in the houses of Henry Howard, Earl of Surrey, and Thomas Howard, 3rd Duke of Norfolk, following their arrests on suspicion of challenging the succession of Prince Edward. Gates and Southwell produced detailed inventories of Kenninghall, the duke's mansion, Castle Rising, and Surrey's house at St. Leonard's, Norwich, while Carew visited and inventoried the house of Elizabeth Holland, the duke's mistress, at Mendham, Suffolk.

Under King Edward VI Gates became a Chief Gentleman of the Privy Chamber after the fall of Protector Somerset in the autumn of 1549. He rose to Vice-Chamberlain of the Royal Household on 8 April 1551; a few days later he was admitted to the Privy Council under the leadership of John Dudley, 1st Duke of Northumberland. In these positions Gates was a significant channel of communications between the Duke and the young King and was granted custody of the King's signet in December 1551. In July 1552 he was appointed Chancellor of the Duchy of Lancaster.

He was a justice of the peace for Essex from 1532 until his execution and served as High Sheriff of Essex for 1549–50. Gates was also a soldier and as Sheriff went several times into Essex to arrest rioters and carry through the official destruction of "superstitious altars". He was also Captain of the Gentlemen Pensioners (the royal guard) from April 1551.

== Parliamentary career ==
Gates was elected MP for Wycombe in 1542, for New Shoreham in 1545, for Southwark in 1547 and for Essex in 1547 and 1553.

== 1553 succession crisis ==
John Gates was deeply involved in the succession crisis of 1553, and Lady Jane Grey claimed that he had confessed to have been the first to have induced King Edward to name her his successor. Notwithstanding Gates's commitment to Edward's will, his putative role in its conception has been questioned by Narasingha P. Sil on the grounds that he probably was not as close to the young King as traditionally believed. On 14 July 1553, Gates led the troops of the royal household to East Anglia in the campaign against Mary I.

He was arrested with Northumberland at Cambridge and tried at Westminster Hall on 19 August 1553. On 22 August 1553, he took the Catholic communion, recanting his Protestant faith in a ceremony at St Peter ad Vincula in the Tower precincts. Immediately afterward, he was executed, together with the Duke of Northumberland and Sir Thomas Palmer on Tower Hill. He was buried in St Peter ad Vincula.

According to one chronicle the following scene had taken place shortly before at the Lieutenant of the Tower's garden gate:

"Sir John," sayeth the duke, "God have mercy upon us, for this day shall end both our lives. And I pray you forgive me whatsoever I have offended; and I forgive you with all my heart, although you and your counsel was a great occasion hereof." "Well, my lord," sayeth Sir John Gates, "I forgive you as I would be forgiven; and yet you and your authority was the only original cause of all together; but the Lord pardon you, and I pray you forgive me." So, either making obeisance to [each] other, the duke proceeded [towards the scaffold].

His Essex estates at Rivenhall and Shalford were confiscated by the Crown.

== See also ==
- Attainder of Duke of Northumberland and others Act 1553

== Notes ==
Political offices
Preceded by Sir Thomas Darcy	Vice-Chamberlain of the Household; 1551–1553	Succeeded by Sir Henry Jerningham
Preceded by Sir Thomas Darcy	Captain of the Yeomen of the Guard; 1551–1553	Succeeded by Sir Henry Jerningham
