= John Cheyne (speaker) =

English politician (died 1414)

Sir John Cheyne or Cheney (died 1414) was a Member of Parliament and briefly the initial Speaker of the House of Commons of England in the Parliament of October 1399, summoned by the newly acclaimed Henry IV.

In 1372, he married Margaret, daughter of William, Lord Deincourt and the widow of Robert, Lord Tiptoft which brought him wealth and status. He became an esquire in the king's household and was knighted in 1378. He took part in a number of diplomatic missions and became MP for Gloucestershire in 1390, 1393, 1394 and 1399.

On the last occasion he was elected Speaker, but stood down on the ostensible grounds of ill-health, but may have been persuaded to do so by the influence of Thomas Arundel, archbishop of Canterbury, who was appalled by his election and warned the clergy that Cheyne was an inveterate enemy of the contemporary church. The revolution of 1399 made for strange bedfellows. Under Henry IV, he continued to be employed on diplomatic missions, including a two-year trip to Rome in 1407.

He acquired property in Beckford, Gloucestershire as his principal estate. Being near to death, he was not implicated in the Oldcastle Rising of 1413/14, which involved a few, but far from all, of the sect, but the Cheynes of Drayton Beauchamp, Buckinghamshire, were, and they seem to have been his eventual heirs after the deaths of his sons.

== Death ==
He died in 1414 and was buried in Beckford churchyard. He had been married a second time to Margaret, daughter and heir of Sir Edward Lovetot of Southoe, Huntingdonshire with whom he had a son, John.

== Sources ==
- Saul, Nigel. "Cheyne, Sir John". Oxford Dictionary of National Biography (online ed.). Oxford University Press. doi:10.1093/ref:odnb/41195. (Subscription, Wikipedia Library access or UK public library membership required.)

Political offices
Preceded by Sir John Bussy	Speaker of the House of Commons; 1399	Succeeded by John Doreward
