= Helming Leget =

English politician

Helming Leget (died 1412), of Tottenham, Middlesex and Black Notley, Essex, was an English courtier and politician.

== Life ==
Leget was the son and heir of Helming Leget of Hadleigh, Suffolk, and London, who died in 1391. His mother was Leget's second wife, Margery Malwayn, a daughter of John Malwayn of West Grafton, Wiltshire. Leget married Alice Mandeville before September 1400, also of Black Notley, Essex. Alice lived from c.1378 to 1 April 1420, outliving her husband. They had one son.

== Career ==
Like his father, Leget was employed by the royal household, in roles including usher of the King's chamber (from at least 1405) and keeper of the King's ships (from 1411). He was appointed High Sheriff of Essex and Hertfordshire for 1403 and 1408, and elected a Member of Parliament for Essex in 1406 and 1407.
