= Thomas Bataill =

14th-century English politician

Thomas Bataill (died c. 1396), of Otes in High Laver and Matching, Essex, was a sheriff and member of parliament in late 14th-century England.

== Life ==
Bataill was a younger son of John Bataill. He married Elizabeth Enfield, the daughter and heiress of Richard Enfield of Otes. They had one son and two daughters. He also had two illegitimate children, one son and one daughter.

== Career ==
Bataill was appointed Sheriff of Essex and Hertfordshire for 1384 and elected member of parliament for Essex in November 1390 and 1394.
