= Henry Barrington (MP for St Germans) =

English politician

Henry Barrington (fl. 1589) was an English politician. He sat as MP for St Germans in 1589.

He was the second surviving son of Sir Thomas Barrington by his second wife. He was the brother of Francis Barrington. He was admitted into Lincoln's Inn in 1583.
