= Robert Swinburne (c. 1327 – 1391) =

English politician

Sir Robert Swinburne (c. 1327 – 6 October 1391), of Swinburn and Gunnerton, Northumberland and Little Horkesley, Essex, was an English politician.

== Life ==
Swinburne was the heir of Thomas Swinburne of Gunnerton, who had died before 1332, when Robert was around five years old.

Before August 1357, he married Agnes Felton, the daughter of the MP, William Felton. They had one daughter and one son, Thomas Swinburne. His second wife was Joan Boutourt, and they had four sons, including William Swinburne, and two daughters.

On his death he was buried at Little Horkesley church, where there are brasses of him and his son Thomas.

== Career ==
Swinburne was knighted by April 1356. He was a Member of Parliament for Essex in January 1377, 1379, October 1382, November 1384 and January 1390.

He served as Sheriff of Essex and Hertfordshire from 1 December 1388 to 30 January 1389.
