= Alexander Walden =

English politician

Sir Alexander Walden (died 1401), of Matching and Rickling, Essex, was an English politician.

== Life ==
Walden was the son of Alexander Walden and the nephew of the MP, Humphrey Walden. He married Elizabeth Somery, the daughter and heiress of John Somery of Bygrave, Hertfordshire. His second wife was Juliana.

== Career ==
Walden was knighted by 1372. He was a member of parliament for Essex in September 1388 and November 1390.
