= Robert Marney =

English gentry

Sir Robert Marney (ca. 1319 – 1400), of Layer Marney, Essex, and Kingsey, Buckinghamshire, was a 14th-century English politician. He was the son of Sir William Marney and his wife Katherine Venables. He has been described as "disreputable local gentry" by one 21st-century historian and was accompanied John Fitzwalter, 2nd Baron FitzWalter on various violent and criminal acts in the Colchester area.

Marney was a Member of Parliament for Essex in 1369, 1371, 1376, October 1377, 1379, November 1380, October 1382, October 1383, November 1384, 1386, and January 1390. He was a justice of the peace for Essex and involved in the suppression of the Peasants' Revolt in 1381.

== See also ==
- Robert de Marny
