= Albyns =

Jacobean country house (1620–1954)

Coordinates: 51.6497°N 0.1778°E

Albyns or Albyns Manor is a former Jacobean country house near Stapleford Abbotts, Essex, built largely about 1620 and demolished about 1954. Its former service range, coach house, and remaining walls and garden pavilion are Grade II listed buildings.

== History and architecture ==
The house was built around an earlier, late 16th-century building in its Eastern and Southern ranges. This building likely had the Great Hall in the South range, however during or by the grand Jacobean rebuilding, the Hall was moved to the North range. The house contained several valuable rooms and was considered "an unusually complete example" of its period. The house was purchased by Sir Robert Abdy in 1654 and was sold by his family in the 1920s. At that time many of the rooms were transported to the USA.

=== Notable rooms ===
==== Great Hall ====
The hall was reportedly greatly updated aside from its fireplace of dark marble.

==== Main staircase ====
The main staircase was early 17th century in date and had newels with "square moulded pendants and terminals surmounted by carved female figures, probably representing the Arts and Virtues."

==== Dining Room ====
The Dining Room contained a 17th-century plaster ceiling and a carved chimneypiece.

==== Long Gallery ====
The Long Gallery occupied the west side of the house. It had a 17th-century plaster ceiling, 17th-century panelling, 18th-century doors, and a black marble fireplace. After the demolition, the room made its way to the now closed Jack's Bar, San Francisco.

There was a suite of rooms above the Long Gallery with many original features.

==== Other rooms ====
Several other rooms retained 16th century fireplaces, several had decorative plaster ceilings and freizes, and many were panelled, many with 17th-century panelling. Some original doors remained, and in the South turrets there remained original 17th-century staircases.
