= John Tyrrell (died 1437) =

English politician (c.1382–1437)

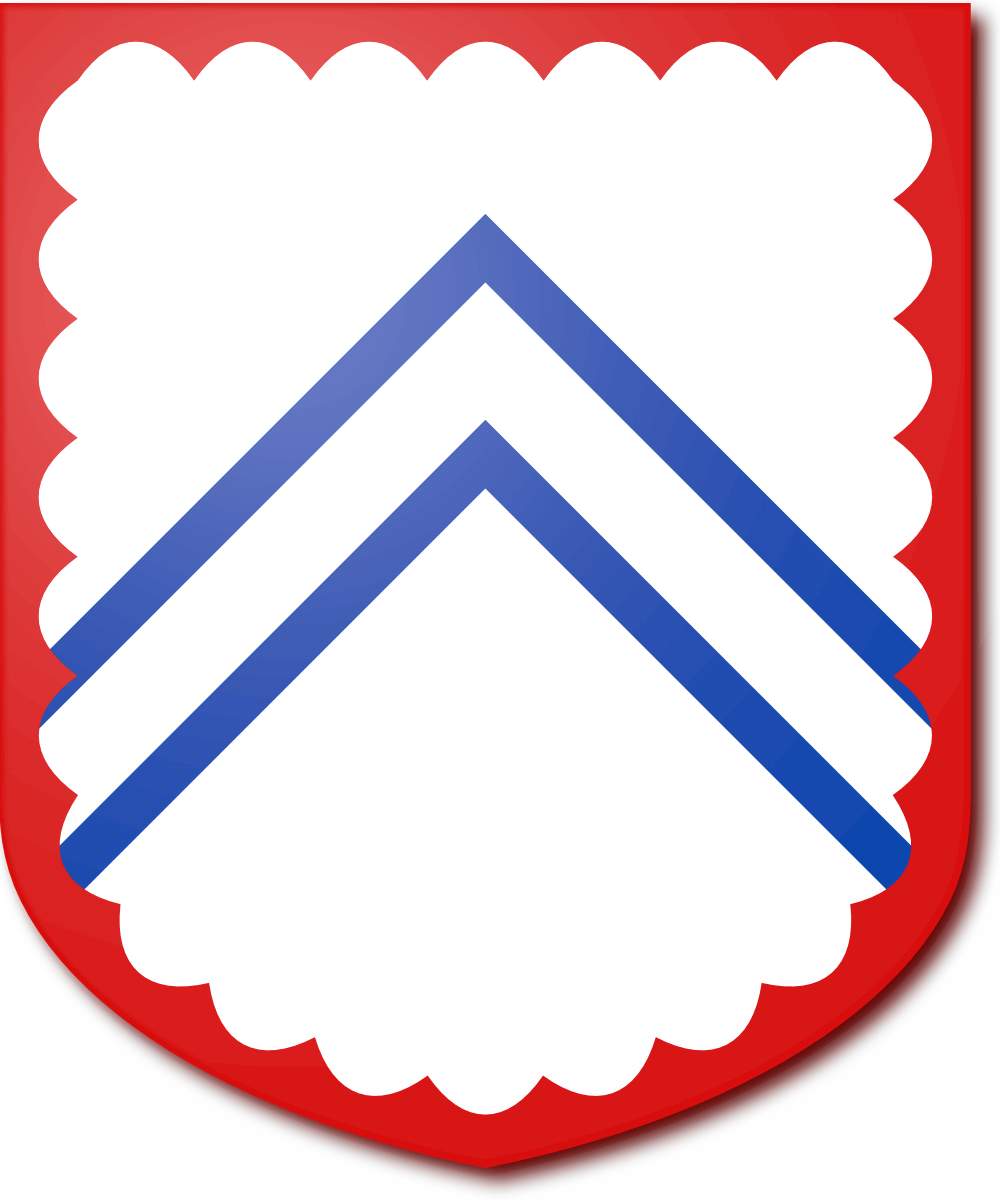
The Tyrrell arms are blazoned Argent, two chevronels azure, a bordure engrailed gules. The family motto is Sans crainte.

Sir John Tyrrell (c.1382 – 2 April 1437), of Heron in the Essex parish of East Horndon, was a prominent English landowner, lawyer, administrator, and politician during the reigns of Henry V and Henry VI. A trusted royal servant, he was elected three times as Speaker of the House of Commons, served repeatedly as knight of the shire for Essex and Hertfordshire, and held senior offices including Treasurer of the Royal Household.

== Origins ==
John Tyrrell was the eldest son of Walter Tyrrell of Avon Tyrrell, Hampshire, by his wife Eleanor Flambard (died 29 March 1422), daughter and heiress of Edmund Flambard of Shepreth, Cambridgeshire, by his wife Elizabeth FitzRalph, daughter of Richard FitzRalph. After the death of Walter Tyrrell, Eleanor remarried to Sir Nicholas Haute (1357–c. 1415), MP, of Wadden Hall in Waltham, Kent.

John was the grandson and heir of Sir Thomas Tyrrell (died 1382) who was buried at Downham, Essex, in 1382, and was survived by his wife, Alice.

=== Brothers ===
Tyrrell had the following four brothers:

- Edward Tyrrell (died 17 December 1442), Esquire, of Downham, who married Anne Pashley, widow of John Bassingbourne and daughter of Sir Robert Pashley by his wife Philippe Sergeaux (sister-in-law of Richard de Vere, 11th Earl of Oxford). By his wife Anne, Edward Tyrrell had the following progeny:
  - Edward Tyrrell, who died without issue.
  - Philippe Tyrrell, daughter, who married, before 1446–7, Thomas Cornwallis (died 26 May 1484) of Brome, Suffolk, by whom she had four sons and a daughter.
  - Margaret Tyrrell, who married Robert Mounteney.
- He also had
  - John Tyrrell, illegitimate son.
- Richard Tyrrell;
- Thomas Tyrrell;
- William Tyrrell, who died before 1442.

=== Sisters ===
He probably also had a sister:

- Elizabeth Tyrrell, who married, as his second wife, Sir William Lisle (died 1442), an illegitimate son of Robert Lisle, 3rd Baron Lisle (died 1399).

== Career ==
John Tyrrell was appointed High Sheriff of Essex and Hertfordshire in 1413 and again in 1423. He was elected knight of the shire for Essex 12 times between 1411 and 1437 and once for Hertfordshire in 1427.

John Tyrrell was elected Speaker of the House of Commons on three occasions, in 1421, 1429, and again in 1437, a distinction achieved by only a small number of fifteenth-century parliamentarians. His repeated election reflects both his legal expertise and his standing among the political community of the Commons.

Tyrrell’s speakerships occurred during periods of political sensitivity, including the minority of Henry VI and debates over royal finance and administration. Contemporary and later sources portray him as a reliable intermediary between the Commons and the Crown, a role consistent with his broader career in royal service.

In 1427 he was appointed steward of Clare in Suffolk and Thaxted in Essex, during the minority of Richard of York, 3rd Duke of York, and chief steward of the Duchy of Lancaster north of Trent. He was a member of King Henry VI's council in France in 1431. He was knighted in 1431 and in May of that year was appointed Treasurer of the Royal Household, a post he held until his death.

== Marriages and issue ==
=== First marriage ===
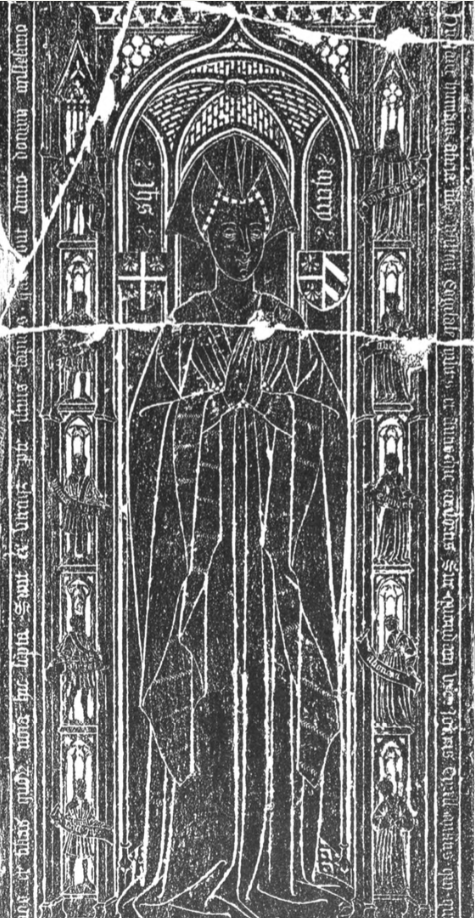
Funerary monument of Alice Tyrrell (née Coggeshall), East Horndon

Tyrrell married firstly, at some time before 1411, Alice Coggeshall, daughter and co-heiress of Sir William Coggeshall by his wife Antiocha Hawkwood, daughter and heiress of Sir John Hawkwood, by whom he had five surviving sons and four daughters, including:

- Sir Thomas Tyrrell (c. 1411 – 28 March 1477) of Heron, eldest son and heir not only to his father but also to his uncle Edward Tyrrell (died 1442). He married Anne Marney, daughter of Sir William Marney (died 21 or 24 August 1414) by his wife Elizabeth Sergeaux, by whom he had four sons and two daughters:
  - Sir William Tyrrell, slain at the Battle of Barnet in 1471, who married firstly Eleanor Darcy, by whom he had a son, Sir Thomas Tyrrell (c. 1453–1512). He married secondly to Eleanor Hungerford;
  - Humphrey Tyrrell (died c. 1507), Esquire, who married firstly Isabel Helion, and secondly Elizabeth Walwin;
  - Sir Robert Tyrrell (died 1508), who married firstly Christian Hartshorn, and secondly to a certain Elizabeth, whose surname is unknown.
  - Thomas Tyrrell (died 26 March 1476), esquire, who married Elizabeth Bruyn (died March 1494), who later remarried to Sir William Brandon (d.1485), by whom she was the mother of Charles Brandon, 1st Duke of Suffolk.
  - Anne Tyrrell, who married John Darcy
  - Elizabeth Tyrrell (died after 1487), who married firstly Sir Robert Darcy (died 2 November 1469), and secondly, Richard Haute (died 8 April 1487), Esquire.
- William Tyrrell of Gipping, Suffolk, beheaded on Tower Hill 23 February 1462, who married Margaret Darcy, by whom he was the father of Sir James Tyrrell.
- William Tyrrell (died c. 1471) of Beeches in Rawreth, Essex, who married firstly Anne Fitz Simon, the daughter of Robert Fitz Simon, and secondly Philippa Thornbury, the daughter of John Thornbury.
- Alice Tyrrell (died 1460), who married firstly Hamo Strange, secondly William Skrene the younger (died 1431), eldest son of William Skrene, Chief Baron of the Irish Exchequer, and thirdly Thomas Pigot, and had a son, John Skrene (died 1452), by her second husband.

=== Second marriage ===
He married secondly, at some time before 1427, Katherine Burgate (died after 1436), the widow successively of Robert Stonham (died 1397), of Stonham Aspal, Suffolk, and John Spencer (died 1417), of Banham, Norfolk, and daughter and co-heiress of Sir William Burgate (died 24 July 1409) of Burgate, Suffolk, by his wife Eleanor Visdelou, daughter of Sir Thomas Visdelou, by whom he had a daughter.

== Sources ==
- Roskell, J.S.; Woodger, L.S. (1993). Roskell, J.S.; Clark, L.; Rawcliffe, C. (eds.). "Biography of Tyrell, John (c.1382-1437), of Heron in East Horndon, Essex". The History of Parliament: House of Commons 1386-1421.
- Burke, John (1834). A Genealogical and Heraldic History of the Commoners of Great Britain and Ireland. Vol. I. London: Henry Colburn. p. 205.
- Fleming, Peter (2004). "Haute family (per. c.1350–1530)". Oxford Dictionary of National Biography (online ed.). Oxford University Press. doi:10.1093/ref:odnb/52786. (Subscription, Wikipedia Library access or UK public library membership required.)
- Gunn, S.J. (1988). Charles Brandon, Duke of Suffolk c.1484–1545. Oxford: Basil Blackwell. pp. 46–7.
- Horrox, Rosemary (2004). "Tyrell family (per. c.1304–c.1510)". Oxford Dictionary of National Biography (online ed.). Oxford University Press. doi:10.1093/ref:odnb/52799. (Subscription, Wikipedia Library access or UK public library membership required.)
- Jacob, E.F., ed. (1938). The Register of Henry Chichele, Archbishop of Canterbury 1414–1443. Vol. II. Oxford: Clarendon Press. pp. 628–36.
- King, H.W. (1865). "Ancient Wills". Transactions of the Essex Archaeological Society. III. Colchester: Essex and West Suffolk Gazette: 75–94.
- King, H.W. (1865). "Ancient Wills". Transactions of the Essex Archaeological Society. III, Part IV. Colchester: Essex and West Suffolk Gazette: 167–97.
- Knighton, C.S., ed. (2003). Calendar of Inquisitions Miscellaneous 1422–1485. Vol. VIII. Woodbridge, Suffolk: The Boydell Press. pp. 107–9.
- Leader, Scott, trans. (1889). Sir John Hawkwood (L. Acuto), Story of A Condottiere, Translated From The Italian of John Temple-Leader, Esq. & Sig. Giuseppe Marcotti. London: T. Fisher Unwin. p. 307.
- Metcalfe, Walter C., ed. (1878). The Visitations of Essex. Vol. XIII. London: Harleian Society. pp. 111, 300–301.
- Moriarty, G. Andrews (1955). "The Early Tyrrels of Heron in East Herndon". New England Historical and Genealogical Register. CIX: 17–31.
- Richardson, Douglas (2011). Everingham, Kimball G. (ed.). Magna Carta Ancestry: A Study in Colonial and Medieval Families. Vol. I (2nd ed.). Salt Lake City. pp. 14, 298. ISBN 978-1449966379.
- Richardson, Douglas (2011). Everingham, Kimball G. (ed.). Magna Carta Ancestry: A Study in Colonial and Medieval Families. Vol. II (2nd ed.). Salt Lake City. pp. 19, 360, 502. ISBN 978-1449966386.
- Richardson, Douglas (2011). Everingham, Kimball G. (ed.). Plantagenet Ancestry: A Study in Colonial and Medieval Families. Vol. III (2nd ed.). Salt Lake City. ISBN 978-1449966355.
- Richardson, Douglas (2011). Everingham, Kimball G. (ed.). Magna Carta Ancestry: A Study in Colonial and Medieval Families. Vol. IV (2nd ed.). Salt Lake City. p. 271. ISBN 978-1460992708.
- Ross, James (2011). John de Vere, Thirteenth Earl of Oxford (1442–1513); 'The Foremost Man of the Kingdom'. Woodbridge, Suffolk: The Boydell Press. ISBN 978-1-84383-614-8.
- Wedgwood's History of Parliament vol. 1 (1936).
- Frederick Chancellor, The Ancient Sepulchral Monuments of Essex, London: Phillimore & Co., 1890, plate L1, pp. 163–164.

Political offices
Preceded by Richard Vernon	Speaker of the House of Commons; 1427-1428	Succeeded by William Alington
Preceded by William Alington	Speaker of the House of Commons; 1431	Succeeded by John Russell
Preceded by John Bowes	Speaker of the House of Commons; 1437	Succeeded by William Burley
