= Gerald Curtis (sheriff) =

Gerald Colville Seymour Curtis, OBE was High Sheriff of Essex from 1973 to 1974.

The son of Sir George Curtis, KCSI he was an administrator in the Indian Civil Service. In 1935 he married Decima Pryor at Bishops Stortford.
