= John Guildesborough =

English politician (died 1389)

Sir John Guildesborough or Gildesburgh (c. 1331 – 1389) was Knight of the Shire for Essex and Speaker of the House of Commons of England in 1380. He was knighted on 14 August 1378.

He was born circa 1331 and educated at Oxford University. He was elected a Knight of the Shire to represent Essex five times between 1380 and 1388 and elected speaker of the house for both parliaments in 1380.

== Marriages ==
He married, firstly, Margery, daughter and coheir of Sir Henry Garnet of Wennington and secondly, Elizabeth, daughter and eventual heiress of William Pembridge. He had no surviving children.

== See also ==
- List of speakers of the House of Commons of England

Political offices
Preceded by Sir James Pickering	Speaker of the House of Commons; 1379–1380	Succeeded by Sir Richard Waldegrave
