= Richard FitzLewis =

English politician

Sir Richard FitzLewis or FitzLowys (by 1453 – 1528), of Bardwell, Suffolk and West Horndon, Essex, was an English politician.

He was a member (MP) of the parliament of England for Maldon in 1487 and 1510, and for Essex in 1495.
