= William Stourton (speaker) =

Member of the Parliament of England

Arms of Stourton: Sable, a bend or between six fountains

William Stourton (died 1413) of Stourton, Wiltshire, was Speaker of the House of Commons from May 1413 to June 1413 when he was serving as MP for Dorset.

== Biography ==
He was the son and heir of John Stourton of Stourton, Wiltshire. His younger half-brother was John Stourton (died 1438) of Preston Plucknett in Somerset, 7 times MP for Somerset, in 1419, 1420, December 1421, 1423, 1426, 1429 and 1435.

He was knight of the shire in Parliament for Somerset in 1401, 1402 and January 1404, for Wiltshire in 1407 and for Dorset in 1410 and again in May 1413, when he was elected Speaker of the House of Commons (United Kingdom).

Stourton married Elizabeth Moigne, daughter and co-heiress of Sir John Moigne of Owermoigne, Dorset, by whom he had a son, John Stourton, 1st Baron Stourton (1400–1462), elevated to the peerage in 1448, and a daughter.

He died in 1413 and was buried in Witham Priory.

Political offices
| Preceded by Thomas Chaucer | Speaker of the House of Commons (United Kingdom); 1413 | Succeeded by John Doreward |
