= John FitzSymond =

14th-century English politician

Sir John FitzSymond (c. 1342 – c. 1392), of North Shoebury, Essex, was an English politician.

He was the son and heir of Sir Edmund Fitzsymond of North Shoebury, Essex

FitzSymond was appointed High Sheriff of Essex and High Sheriff of Hertfordshire for 1378–1379 and was elected a member of parliament for Essex in April 1384, 1385 and September 1388.
