= Thomas Bonham (died 1532) =

English politician (died 1532)

Thomas Bonham (by 1482 – 1532) was an English politician. He sat as MP for Essex in 1529.

== Family and education ==
He was educated at the Inner Temple. In 1508/9, he married Catherine, the daughter of Henry Marney, 1st Baron Marney, the widow of Edward Knyvet and they had five sons (including William Bonham) and two daughters.

== Offices held ==
He served as receiver-general of the Duchy of Lancaster from 1509 till his death, and steward of Savoy manor from 1523 till his death; justice of the peace for Essex from 1510 till possibly his death; recorder of Colchester from 1511 till 1529; commissioner of subsidy in Essex in 1512, 1514, 1515, 1523, 1524, and in Colchester in 1523, and 1524; he served in other commissions from 1512 till 1530; as keeper of writs and rolls, captain of common pleas in 1520; Sheriff of Essex and Hertfordshire from 1520 till February 1522, 1526 till 1527; and bencher of the Inner Temple in 1530.
