= William Swinburne (Essex MP) =

English politician

William Swinburne (died 1422), of Gestingthorpe and Little Horkesley, Essex, was an English politician.

== Family ==
Swinubrne was a younger son of Sir Robert Swinburne and his second wife. He was the half-brother of Sir Thomas Swinburne. Around February 1407, he married Philippa Cergeaux, a daughter of Sir Richard Cergeaux of Cornwall.

== Career ==
Swinburne was a Member of Parliament for Essex in November 1414.
