= Thomas Coggeshall =

English politician

Thomas Coggeshall (died 1402), of New Hall in Boreham, Great Baddow and Sandon, Essex, was an English politician.

== Life ==
Coggeshall was the son of the MP Sir John Coggeshall of Codham Hall and Coggeshall, Essex. The Coggeshalls were influential in Essex

He married a widow named Margaret, who had previously been married to the MP Sir Hugh Baddow. She died 28 Feb 1419, outliving her second husband.

He died in 1402 and was succeeded by their only son Thomas.

== Career ==
Coggeshall was elected a Member of Parliament for Essex in February 1388, 1395 and 1399 and appointed Sheriff of Essex for 1394.
