= Essex (constituency) =

Parliamentary constituency in the United Kingdom, 1801–1832

- Former county constituency for the House of Commons
- County: Essex

1290–1832
- Seats: Two
- Replaced by: Essex North and Essex South

Essex was a constituency represented in the House of Commons of the Parliament of England from 1290 to 1707, then of the Parliament of Great Britain from 1707 to 1800 and of the Parliament of the United Kingdom from 1801 to 1832. It elected two MPs, traditionally referred to as Knights of the Shire, to the House of Commons. Under the Great Reform Act 1832, it was divided into two two-member constituencies (Essex North and Essex South).

== Area covered (current authorities) ==
East of England

- Essex (ceremonial county)
  - Essex (administrative county)
  - Southend-on-Sea
  - Thurrock

Greater London

- Barking and Dagenham
- Havering
- Newham
- Redbridge
- Waltham Forest

== Members of Parliament ==
=== 1290-1640 ===
Parliament	First member	Second member
1290	John le Breton	John Fillol; Henry Grapinel; John de Beauchamp of Fifield
1295	John Fillol	Ralph de Arderne
1297	John Fillol	Henry Grapinel
1298	Hugh le Blount	Jollan de Duresem
1300	John Fillol	Hugh le Blount
1301	John Fillol	Hugh le Blount
1302	Ralph de Arderne	Jollan de Dureseme
1305	John de Tany	William de Wauton
1306	John de Sutton	Ralph le Bigod
1307	John de Tany	John de la Lee
1309	Sir Nicholas Barrington	
1313	Sir Nicholas Barrington	
1322	Thomas Gobion	Simon de Kynardesle
1330	Sir John Barrington	
1334	Sir John de Coggeshall	
1335	Sir John de Coggeshall	
1336	Sir John de Coggeshall	
1339	Sir John de Coggeshall	
1343	Sir John de Coggeshall	
c1355	Sir Thomas Tyrell (7 times)	
1358	Sir John de Coggeshall	
1377	Sir Robert Swinburne	
1379	Sir Robert Swinburne	
1380 (Jan)	Sir John Guildesborough	Richard Lyons
1380 (Nov)	Sir John Guildesborough	
1382	Sir Robert Swinburne	
1383 (Feb)	Sir John Guildesborough	
1384	Sir Robert Swinburne	
1385	Sir John Guildesborough	
1386	Sir Robert Marney	Edmund Brokesbourne
1388 (Feb)	Sir John Guildesborough	Thomas Coggeshall
1388 (Sep)	Sir Alexander Walden	Sir John FitzSymond
1390 (Jan)	Sir Robert Swinburne	Sir Robert Marney
1390 (Nov)	Sir Alexander Walden	Thomas Bataill
1391	Sir William Coggleshall	Sir Walter Lee
1393	Sir Thomas Swinburne	Sir Walter Lee
1394	Thomas Bataill	Sir Walter Lee
1395	Thomas Coggeshall	John Doreward
1397 (Jan)	Sir William Coggleshall	John Doreward
1397 (Sep)	Sir John Howard	Robert Tey
1399	Thomas Coggeshall	John Doreward
1401	Sir William Coggleshall	Robert Tey
1402	Sir William Coggleshall	Sir Gerard Braybrooke
1404 (Jan)	Sir William Bourchier	John Doreward
1404 (Oct)	Sir William Coggleshall	Sir Robert Litton
1406	Helming Leget	Richard Baynard
1407	Helming Leget	Sir William Marney
1410		
1411	Sir William Coggleshall	John Tyrell
1413 (Feb)		
1413 (May)	John Doreward	John Tyrell
1414 (Apr)	Sir William Coggleshall	John Doreward
1414 (Nov)	William Swinburne	Richard Baynard
1415		
1416 (Mar)	Robert Darcy	John Tyrell
1416 (Oct)		
1417	Sir Gerard Braybrooke	John Tyrell
1419	Robert Darcy	John Tyrell
1420	Sir William Coggleshall	Lewis John
1421 (May)	Robert Darcy	John Tyrell
1421 (Dec)	Sir William Coggleshall	Richard Baynard
1422	John Tyrell	Sir William Coggleshall
1423	Robert Darcy	
1425	John Tyrell	Robert Darcy
1426	Lewis John	Robert Darcy
1429	John Tyrell	
1431	Sir John Tyrell	Lewis John
1432	Robert Darcy	
1433	Sir John Tyrell	
1437	Sir John Tyrell	Lewis John
1439	Lewis John	Robert Darcy
1442	Thomas Tyrell	
1445	Thomas Tyrell	Robert Darcy
1447	Thomas Tyrell	
1449	Thomas Tyrell	
1453	Thomas Thorpe	
1455	John Green	
1459	Thomas Tyrell	
1460	John Green	
1495	Richard FitzLewis	
1510–1515	No names known	
1523	Sir John Marney	?
1529	Thomas Bonham	Thomas Audley
1536	?Richard Rich	?
1539	Sir Richard Rich	Sir Thomas Darcy
1542	?Sir Richard Rich	?
1545	Sir Richard Rich	Sir Thomas Darcy
1547	Sir William Petre	Sir Thomas Darcy, ennobled and replaced by Jan 1552 by John Gates
1553 (Mar)	Sir John Gates	?Sir William Petre
1553 (Oct)	Sir Robert Rochester	Sir William Petre
1554 (Apr)	Sir Robert Rochester	Sir William Petre
1554 (Nov)	Sir Robert Rochester	Sir William Petre
1555	Sir Robert Rochester	Sir William Petre
1558	Sir William Petre	Sir Edward Waldegrave
1559 (Jan)	Sir William Petre	Sir Anthony Cooke
1562–3	Sir William Petre	Sir Anthony Cooke
1571	Sir Thomas Smith	Sir Thomas Mildmay
1572 (Apr)	Sir Thomas Smith, died and replaced Feb 1581 by Robert Rich	Sir Thomas Barrington
1584 (Nov)	Sir Thomas Heneage	John Petre, 1st Baron Petre
1586	Sir Thomas Heneage	John Petre, 1st Baron Petre
1588 (Nov)	Sir Thomas Heneage	Sir Henry Grey
1593	Sir Thomas Heneage	Richard Warren
1597 (Sep)	William Petre	John Wentworth
1601 (Sep)	Henry Maynard	Sir Francis Barrington
1604	Sir Edward Denny ennobled and replaced 1605 by Sir Gamaliel Capell	Sir Francis Barrington, 1st Baronet
1614	Sir Robert Rich	Sir Richard Weston
1621-1622	Sir Francis Barrington, 1st Baronet	Sir John Deane
1624	Sir Francis Barrington, 1st Baronet	Sir Thomas Cheek
1625	Sir Francis Barrington, 1st Baronet	Sir Arthur Harris
1626	Sir Francis Barrington, 1st Baronet	Sir Harbottle Grimston
1628	Sir Francis Barrington, 1st Baronet	Sir Harbottle Grimston
1629	Robert Rich, Lord Rich	Sir Harbottle Grimston
1629–1640	No Parliaments convened	

=== 1640-1832 ===
- Apr 1640: Sir Thomas Barrington, Sir Harbottle Grimston
- Nov 1640: Lord Rich; Sir William Masham
- 1641: Rich elevated to the House of Lords - replaced by Sir Martin Lumley
- 1648: Lumley excluded under Pride's Purge
- 1653: Joachim Matthews; Henry Barrington; John Brewster; Christopher Earl; Dudley Templer
- 1654: Sir William Masham Bt; Sir Richard Everard, 1st Baronet of Much Waltham; Sir Thomas Honywood; Sir Thomas Bowes; Henry Mildmay (of Graces); Thomas Coke (of Pebmarsh); Carew Mildmay; Dionysius Wakering; Edward Turnor; Richard Cutts; Oliver Raymond; Herbert Pelham
- 1656-1658: Sir Harbottle Grimston; Sir Richard Everard, 1st Baronet of Much Waltham; Sir Thomas Honywood; Sir Thomas Bowes; Henry Mildmay (of Graces); Robert Barrington; Carew Mildmay; Dionysius Wakering; Edward Turnor; Dudley Temple; Oliver Raymond; Hezekiah Haynes; John Archer

Year	First member	First party	Second member	Second party
1659	Lord Rich		Edward Turnor	
April 1660	John Bramston		Edward Turnor	
1661	John Bramston		Sir Benjamin Ayloffe	
1663	John Bramston		Banastre Maynard	
February 1679	Sir Eliab Harvey		Henry Mildmay	
August 1679	John Lamotte Honywood		Henry Mildmay	
1685	Sir William Maynard		Sir Thomas Fanshawe	
1689	Henry Mildmay		John Wroth	
1690	Henry Mildmay		Sir Francis Masham	Whig
1693	John Lamotte Honywood		Sir Francis Masham	Whig
1694	Sir Charles Barrington	Tory	Sir Francis Masham	Whig
1698	Sir Charles Barrington	Tory	Edward Bullock	
1701	Sir Charles Barrington	Tory	Sir Francis Masham	Whig
1705	Lord Walden	Whig	Sir Francis Masham	Whig
1707	Thomas Middleton		Sir Francis Masham	Whig
1710	Thomas Middleton		Sir Richard Child	Tory
1713	Sir Charles Barrington	Tory	Sir Richard Child	Tory
February 1715	Thomas Middleton		Sir Richard Child	Tory
May 1715	William Harvey		Sir Richard Child	Tory
1716	Robert Honywood		Sir Richard Child	Tory
1722	Robert Honywood		William Harvey	
1727	The Viscount Castlemaine	Whig	Sir Robert Abdy	Tory
1734	Thomas Bramston	Tory	Sir Robert Abdy	Tory
1747	William Harvey		Sir Robert Abdy	Tory
1748	William Harvey		Sir John Abdy	Tory
1759	William Harvey		Sir William Maynard	
1763	John Luther		Sir William Maynard	
1772	John Luther		John Conyers	
1775	John Luther		William Harvey	
1779	John Luther		Thomas Berney Bramston	
1784	Colonel John Bullock		Thomas Berney Bramston	
1802	Colonel John Bullock		Eliab Harvey	
1810	John Archer-Houblon		Eliab Harvey	
1812	John Archer-Houblon		Charles Callis Western	
1820	Sir Eliab Harvey		Charles Callis Western	
March 1830	Thomas Gardiner Bramston		Charles Callis Western	
August 1830	Sir John Tyssen Tyrell		Charles Callis Western	
1831	William Pole-Tylney-Long-Wellesley		Charles Callis Western	
1832	Constituency abolished: see Northern Essex, Southern Essex			

New constituency	UK Parliament constituency 1660 – 1832	Succeeded by Essex North
New constituency	UK Parliament constituency 1660 – 1832	Succeeded by Essex South
