= Sir Thomas Smyth, 1st Baronet =

Sir Thomas Smyth, Bt

High Sheriff of Essex
- In office 1663–1664
- Preceded by: Sir Martin Lumley, Bt
- Succeeded by: Sir William Luckyn, Bt

Personal details
- Born: c. 1602
- Died: 5 May 1668 (aged 65–66)
- Spouse(s): Joan Altham (m. 1632; died 1658) Hon. Beatrice, Lady Lloyd (m. 1664; died 1668)
- Relations: Sir Thomas Smith (granduncle); Thomas Fleetwood (grandfather)
- Parent(s): Sir William Smith; Bridget Fleetwood

Sir Thomas Smyth, 1st Baronet (c. 1602 – 5 May 1668) was an English landowner who served as Sheriff of Essex.

== Early life ==
Smyth was born inc. 1602. He was the third, and youngest, son of Col. Sir William Smith, of Hill Hall, Essex, and the former Bridget Fleetwood. His father was a Colonel in the Army in Ireland, and was later sent by King James I to Spain with the Ambassador.

Smyth's paternal grandfather was George Smith, a London draper, who inherited the estate (which Thomas eventually inherited) of his brother, Sir Thomas Smith, the Secretary of State during the reigns of King Edward VI and Queen Elizabeth I, three-time Ambassador to France and Chancellor of the Order of the Garter. Smyth's maternal grandfather was Thomas Fleetwood, Master of the Mint.

He was admitted to study law at Gray's Inn in 1619/20, and inherited the family estate of Hill Hall from his nephew, Edward Smith.

== Career ==
He was created a baronet, of Hill Hall in the County of Essex, 28 November 1661, and served as High Sheriff of Essex from 1663 to 1664. He was Lord of the manor of Thaxted, and owned Horham Hall there (which had been acquired by his father in 1617). (Note: Horham Hall remained in the possession of the Smith family until the death of the Reverend Sir Edward Bowyer-Smijth, 10th Baronet, in 1850. The Smiths were seldom resident, and the architect Charles Buckler wrote in 1843: "The mansion has been uninhabited for about 40 years but it is kept in good repair. The walls, roof, parapet and chimneys are quite entire and not one of the rooms, tho' all are unfurnished, is made ye resceptical of rubbish, even dust is denied a resting place.")

== Personal life ==
In 1632, he married Joan Altham, daughter of Sir Edward Altham of Mark Hall, Essex, and Joan Leventhorpe. Before her death in July 1658, they were the parents of:

- Edward Smyth (1637–1713), who married Jane Vandeput, daughter of Peter Vandeput and sister of Sir Peter Vandeput, 1st Baronet, in 1674.
- James Smith (1640–1711), who married Elizabeth Parkhurst, daughter of Sir Robert Parkhurst.
- Ven. Charles Smith (d. 1680), who served as Archdeacon of Colchester from 1675 until his death in 1680.

After her death, he married the former Hon. Beatrice Annesley in 1664. The daughter of Francis Annesley, 1st Viscount Valentia and Dorothea Philipps (a daughter of Sir John Philipps, 1st Baronet of Picton Castle), she was a widow of both James Zouche and Sir John Lloyd, 1st Baronet. Her son from her second marriage, John, became the 2nd Baronet.

He died 5 May 1668 and was buried at Theydon Mount, near Epping, Essex, his monument bearing the 'Smyth' spelling used for the next several generations by his descendants. He was succeeded by his second but first surviving son Edward. Edward was succeeded by his only son, another Sir Edward Smyth, who died in 1744, to be followed by three sons in succession: Sir Edward (died 1760; Sir Charles, died 1773; and Sir William, died 1777, who had attended Trinity College, Cambridge and was rector of Stapleford Tawney and Theydon Mount before succeeding to the baronetcy.

Baronetage of England
New creation	Baronet (of Hill Hall); 1661–1668	Succeeded by Edward Smyth
