= Sir Edward Smyth, 2nd Baronet =

English landowner (1637–1713)

Sir Edward Smyth, Bt

High Sheriff of Essex
- In office 1680–1681
- Preceded by: William Palmer
- Succeeded by: Thomas Dawtry

Personal details
- Born: 28 September 1637
- Died: 24 June 1713 (aged 75)
- Spouse: Jane Vandeput (m. 1674; died 1658)
- Relations: Charles Smith (brother); Sir William Smyth, 6th Baronet (grandson)
- Children: Sir Edward Smyth, 3rd Baronet
- Parent(s): Sir Thomas Smyth, 1st Baronet; Joan Altham

Sir Edward Smyth, 2nd Baronet (28 September 1637 – 24 June 1713) was an English landowner who served as Sheriff of Essex.

== Early life ==
Smyth was baptised on 28 September 1637 at Thaxted, Essex. He was the second, but first surviving, son of Sir Thomas Smyth, 1st Baronet, of Hill Hall, Essex, and Joan Altham, a daughter of Sir Edward Altham of Mark Hall, Essex, and Joan (née Leventhorpe) Altham. After his mother's death in 1658, his father married the former Hon. Beatrice Annesley, the daughter of Francis Annesley, 1st Viscount Valentia and Dorothea Philipps (a daughter of Sir John Philipps, 1st Baronet of Picton Castle), widow of both James Zouche and Sir John Lloyd, 1st Baronet.

Among his siblings were James Smith (who married Elizabeth Parkhurst, daughter of Sir Robert Parkhurst), and Ven. Charles Smith, Archdeacon of Colchester. Smyth's maternal grandparents were the former Bridget Fleetwood (daughter of Thomas Fleetwood, Master of the Mint) and Col. Sir William Smith, the nephew, and eventual heir, of Sir Thomas Smith, the Secretary of State during the reigns of King Edward VI and Queen Elizabeth I, three-time Ambassador to France and Chancellor of the Order of the Garter.

Smyth was admitted to Gray's Inn in c. 1656.

== Career ==
Edward succeeded his father, becoming second Baronet of Hill Hall on 5 May 1668. He was Lord of the manor of Thaxted, and owned Horham Hall there (which had been acquired by his grandfather in 1617). (Note: Horham Hall remained in the possession of the Smith family until the death of the Reverend Sir Edward Bowyer-Smijth, 10th Baronet, in 1850. The Smiths were seldom resident, and the architect Charles Buckler wrote in 1843: "The mansion has been uninhabited for about 40 years but it is kept in good repair. The walls, roof, parapet and chimneys are quite entire and not one of the rooms, tho' all are unfurnished, is made ye resceptical of rubbish, even dust is denied a resting place.") He served as High Sheriff of Essex from 1680 to 1681.

== Personal life ==
On 6 May 1674, Smyth was married to Jane Vandeput, daughter of Peter Vandeput and Jane (née Hoste) Vandeput. She was a sister of Sir Peter Vandeput, 1st Baronet. Together, they were the parents of:

- Sir Edward Smyth, 3rd Baronet (1686–1744), who married Anne Hedges, daughter of Rt. Hon. Sir Charles Hedges and Eleanor Smith, in c. 1709. After her death, he married Elizabeth Wood, daughter of John Wood.

Sir Edward died on 24 June 1713 and was buried at Theydon Mount, near Epping, Essex. He was succeeded in the baronetcy by his only son, another Sir Edward Smyth, who died 16 August 1744, to be followed by three sons in succession: Sir Edward, died 1760; Sir Charles, died 1773; and Sir William, died 1777.

=== Descendants ===
Through his only son Edward, he was a grandfather of Sir Edward Smyth, 4th Baronet (1710–1760), Sir Charles Smyth, 5th Baronet (1711–1773), and Sir William Smyth, 6th Baronet (c. 1719–1777), who attended Trinity College, Cambridge and was rector of Stapleford Tawney and Theydon Mount.

Honorary titles
Preceded by William Palmer	High Sheriff of Essex; 1680–1681	Succeeded by Thomas Dawtry
Baronetage of England
Preceded by Thomas Smyth	Baronet (of Hill Hall); 1668–1713	Succeeded by Edward Smyth
