= Charles Smith (priest) =

English Anglican priest

The Venerable Charles Smith (died 1680) was an English Anglican priest in the 17th century.

== Early life ==
He was a younger son of Sir Thomas Smyth, 1st Baronet, of Hill Hall, Essex, and Joan Altham, a daughter of Sir Edward Altham of Mark Hall, Essex, and Joan (née Leventhorpe) Altham. After his mother's death in 1658, his father married the former Hon. Beatrice Annesley, the daughter of Francis Annesley, 1st Viscount Valentia and Dorothea Philipps (a daughter of Sir John Philipps, 1st Baronet of Picton Castle), widow of both James Zouche and Sir John Lloyd, 1st Baronet.

Among his siblings were Sir Edward Smyth, 2nd Baronet and James Smith (who married Elizabeth Parkhurst, daughter of Sir Robert Parkhurst). Smyth's maternal grandparents were the former Bridget Fleetwood (daughter of Thomas Fleetwood, Master of the Mint) and Col. Sir William Smith, the nephew, and eventual heir, of Sir Thomas Smith, the Secretary of State during the reigns of King Edward VI and Queen Elizabeth I, three-time Ambassador to France and Chancellor of the Order of the Garter.

== Career ==
Smith was a Fellow of The Queen's College, Oxford. He held the living at St Mary, Sompting and St Martin, Ludgate in the City of London. He was a Canon of st Paul's Cathedral. He was Archdeacon of Colchester from 1675 until his death in 1680.
