= Sir William Smyth, 6th Baronet =

The Reverend Sir Edward Smyth, Bt
- Born: c. 1719
- Died: 25 January 1777 (aged 57–58)
- Education: Trinity Hall, Cambridge
- Spouse: Abigail Wood
- Parent(s): Sir Edward Smyth, 3rd Baronet; Anne Hedges
- Relatives: Sir Edward Smyth, 2nd Baronet (grandfather); Charles Hedges (grandfather); Sir Edward Bowyer-Smijth, 10th Baronet (grandson)

Sir William Smyth, 6th Baronet (c. 1719 – 25 January 1777) was an English landowner and clergyman.

== Early life ==
He was a younger son of Sir Edward Smyth, 3rd Baronet and the former Anne Hedges, who received £10,000 from her father on her marriage to Smyth in January 1710. Among his elder brothers were Sir Edward Smyth, 4th Baronet and Sir Charles Smyth, 5th Baronet.

His paternal grandparents were Sir Edward Smyth, 2nd Baronet and the former Jane Vandeput (a daughter of Peter Vandeput). His maternal grandparents were the former Eleanor Smith and Rt. Hon. Sir Charles Hedges, a Judge of the High Court of Admiralty from 1689 to 1714 who later served as one of Queen Anne's Secretaries of State.

He graduated from Trinity Hall, Cambridge in 1754 with a Bachelor of Laws.

== Career ==
He served as Rector at Theydon Mount, between 1754 and 1755 and Rector at Stapleford Tawney, Essex, between 1754 and 1755.

Upon the death of his elder brother on 24 March 1773, he succeeded as the 6th Baronet Smith, of Hill Hall. He also became Lord of the manor of Thaxted, and owned Horham Hall there (which had been acquired by his family in 1617). (Note: Horham Hall remained in the possession of the Smith family until the death of the Reverend Sir Edward Bowyer-Smijth, 10th Baronet, in 1850. The Smiths were seldom resident, and the architect Charles Buckler wrote in 1843: "The mansion has been uninhabited for about 40 years but it is kept in good repair. The walls, roof, parapet and chimneys are quite entire and not one of the rooms, tho' all are unfurnished, is made ye resceptical of rubbish, even dust is denied a resting place.")

== Personal life ==
Before 1746, Smyth was married to Abigail Wood (c. 1716–1787), a daughter of Andrew Wood. Together, they were the parents of:

- Elizabeth Smyth, who married Capt. George Handfield of Serlby Hall, Nottinghamshire, in 1776.
- Sir William Smijth, 7th Baronet (1746–1823), who married Anne Windham, daughter and eventual heiress of John Windham (later Windham-Bowyer) and Mary Windham, in 1779.
- Charles Smyth (1752–1792), who married Philadelphia Vandeput, daughter of Sir George Vandeput, 2nd Baronet, in 1779.
- Reverend Richard Smyth (1756–1811), Rector at Great Warley, Essex; he married Charlotte Montagu, daughter of James Montagu and sister to George Montagu. (Note: Charlotte's father, James Montagu (1713–1790), was a great-great-grandson of Lord James Montagu (d. 1665), a younger son of Henry Montagu, 1st Earl of Manchester.)

Smyth died on 25 January 1777 and was buried on 8 February 1777 at Theydon Mount, near Epping, Essex. Like his grandfather, he was succeeded in the baronetcy by his eldest son, William (who changed the spelling of their surname from Smyth to Smijth by 1799) after which the baronetcy would be inherited by three sons in succession, Sir Thomas, who died unmarried in 1833, Sir John, a Commander in the Royal Navy, who likewise died unmarried in 1838, and Sir Edward, who attended Trinity College, becoming vicar of Camberwell, and Chaplain to King George IV.

=== Descendants ===
Through his daughter Elizabeth, he was posthumously grandfather of Catherine Elizabeth Handfield (1783–1862), who married William Monckton-Arundell, 5th Viscount Galway, son of Robert Monckton-Arundell, 4th Viscount Galway, in 1804.

Baronetage of England
Preceded by Charles Smyth	Baronet (of Hill Hall); 1773–1777	Succeeded by William Smijth
