= Relic (disambiguation) =

A relic, in religion, is the preserved physical remains or personal effects of a saint or venerated person. By extension, it may mean a preserved remainder of a previous time.

Relic, Relics or The Relic may also refer to:

== Film and television ==
- The Relic (film), a 1997 horror film based on the 1995 novel Relic by Preston and Child
- Relic (2020 film), an Australian horror film
- Relics: Einstein's Brain, a 1994 documentary
- "The Relic" (Silo), a 2023 television episode
- "Relics" (Star Trek: The Next Generation), a TV episode
- "Relic", an episode of Smallville (season 3)
- "Relic", a fictional character in The Beachcombers

== Gaming ==
- Relic Entertainment, a Canadian video game developer
  - Relic Online, a former online gaming system
- Relic (Dungeons & Dragons), a fictional magical item
- Relic, a collectible item in the video game series Crash Bandicoot
- Relic, an objective in video game Age of Empires II: The Age of Kings

== Literature ==
- Relic (Foster novel), a 2018 novel by Alan Dean Foster
- Relic (Preston and Child novel), a 1995 novel by Douglas Preston and Lincoln Child
- The Relic (Anthony novel), a 1991 novel by Evelyn Anthony
- The Relic (Queiroz novel), an 1887 novel by José Maria de Eça de Queirós
- Relic, a 2001 novel by Tom Egeland
- Relic, a comic book enemy of Green Lantern
- Relic the Pika, a character in the Post-Super Genesis Wave timeline of the Sonic the Hedgehog Archie comics

== Music ==
- Relics (album), by Pink Floyd, 1971
- "The Relic", a song by Iced Earth from the 2017 album Incorruptible
- "The Relic", a song by Rings of Saturn from the 2017 album Ultu Ulla
- "The Relic", a song by Symphony X from the 1998 album Twilight in Olympus

== Science and technology ==
- Relic, used as an adjective denoting that this source is directly from the Big Bang as predicted by theory
- Relic radiation, constituting the earliest light scattering from recombination and the furthest we can look back in time using electromagnetic observation
- Relic neutrinos, from the hypothetical last scattering of neutrinos one second after the Big Bang
- Relic gravitational waves, the component of the gravitational wave background originating directly from cosmic inflation

== See also ==
- Relict, a surviving remnant of a natural phenomenon
- Relix, a magazine that focuses on live and improvisational music
- Residue (disambiguation)
