= Sir William Bowyer-Smijth, 12th Baronet =

English diplomat (1840–1916)

Sir William Bowyer-Smijth, Bt

High Sheriff of Essex
- In office 1889–1889
- Preceded by: Edward North Buxton
- Succeeded by: Richard Beale Colvin

Personal details
- Born: 1 September 1840
- Died: 22 July 1916 (aged 75); Tunbridge Wells
- Relations: Sir Henry Bruce Meux, 3rd Baronet (cousin); George Capell, 7th Earl of Essex (cousin)
- Parent(s): Sir William Bowyer-Smijth, Bt; Marianne Frances Meux
- Education: Eton College

Sir William Bowyer-Smijth, 12th Baronet (1 September 1840 – 22 July 1916) was an English diplomat.

== Early life ==
Bowyer-Smijth was born on 1 September 1840 and baptised on 21 September 1840 at 13 Lower Grosvenor Street in London. He was the son of Sir William Bowyer-Smijth, 11th Baronet and Marianne Frances Meux. While still married to his mother, his father left her and, pretending to be a widower, courted and then married sixteen year old Eliza Fechnie Malcolm. They had twelve children, six sons and seven daughters while his mother was still alive. A week after his mother's death in 1875, his father remarried Eliza. Although legitimised under Scottish law by petition in 1918, the baronetcy and estates could not pass to the children of his father's second marriage.

His paternal grandfather was the Rev. Sir Edward Bowyer-Smijth, 10th Baronet of Hill Hall, in 1839. His maternal grandparents were Sir Henry Meux, 1st Baronet and the former Elizabeth-Mary Smith. Among his extended family were first cousins, Sir Henry Bruce Meux, 3rd Baronet (who married socialite Valerie Langdon) and George Capell, 7th Earl of Essex, who married American heiress Adele Beach Grant.

Bowyer-Smijth was educated at Eton College.

== Career ==
He joined the Diplomatic Service in 1858 and by 1863 was Third Secretary in 1863. He was Second Secretary to Constantinople between 1874 and 1881 Secretary of the British Legation to Yeddo (the former name of Tokyo) between 1881 and 1883 until his resignation.

Upon the death of his father on 20 November 1883, he succeeded as the 12th Baronet Smith, of Hill Hall and was appointed High Sheriff of Essex in 1889.

== Personal life ==
Sir William died, unmarried, on 22 July 1916 at Arundel House on Clarence Road in Tunbridge Wells. The baronetcy then reverted to his first cousin, Alfred John Bowyer-Smyth, eldest son of the Rev. Alfred John Edward Bowyer-Smijth, younger son of his grandfather, who thus became the 13th Baronet who changed the spelling of the family surname to Bowyer-Smyth. He also died childless in 1927 and was succeeded by his nephew, Philip, the son of Clement Weyland Bowyer-Smijth.

Baronetage of England
Preceded by William Bowyer-Smijth	Baronet (of Hill Hall); 1883–1916	Succeeded by Alfred John Bowyer-Smyth
