= Jones Law Office =

Historic building in Appomattox, Virginia

- U.S. Historic district – Contributing property
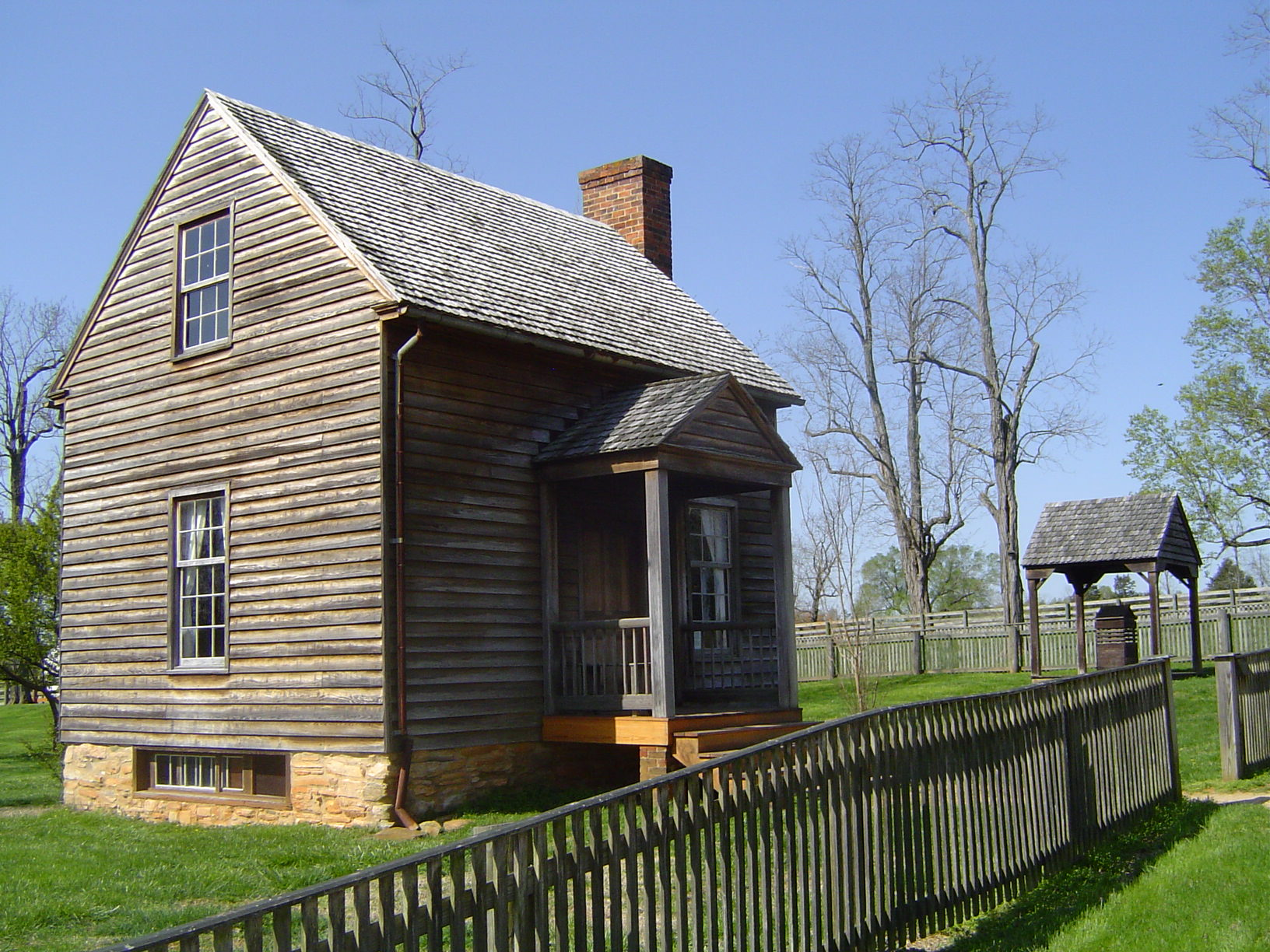
- Jones Law Office

- Location within Virginia Location within the United States
- Location: Appomattox County, Virginia
- Nearest city: Appomattox, Virginia
- Coordinates: 37°22′43″N 78°47′47″W
- Visitation: 185,443 (2009)
- Part of: Appomattox Court House National Historical Park (ID66000827)
- Added to NRHP: October 15, 1966

The Jones Law Office, also known as the Lorenzo D. Kelly House, is a structure within the Appomattox Court House National Historical Park. In the nineteenth century the structure was owned by Kelly and used as a single-family house. The original law office was also used as a dwelling by John Robinson for his large family in the nineteenth century after Kelly.

The one room structure is historically significant to the Appomattox Court House National Historical Park and was registered in the National Park Service's database of Official Structures on June 26, 1989.

== Historical significance ==
The Appomattox Court House National Historical Park declares there are three of the National Register Criteria that make the structure historically significant.

- Criteria A - It has meaningful value because of its association with the site of the surrender of the Confederacy's supreme military commander and its principal army, which represented the conclusion of the American Civil War.
- Criteria B - It has meaningful value because of its association with the site of the surrender of Gen. Robert E. Lee and his subordinate commanders to Lt. Gen. Ulysses S. Grant, future President of the United States.
- Criteria C - It preserves the distinctive characteristics of embodying the period and method of construction typical in Piedmont Virginia in the mid-nineteenth century. It is considered typical of a county government seat and of a typical farming community in mid-nineteenth century Virginia.

== Description ==
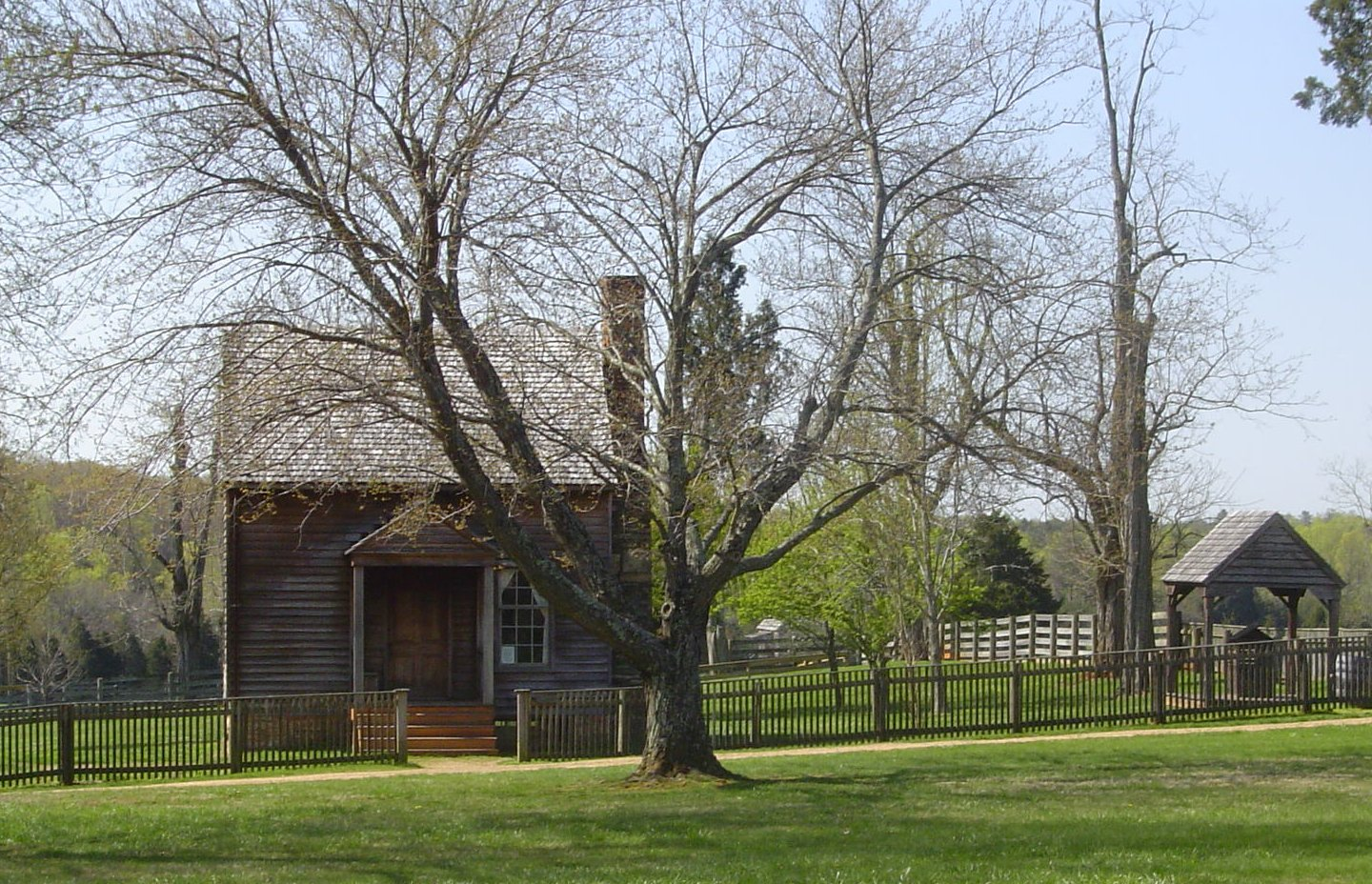
Jones Law Office (front)

The Jones Law Office is a single story structure furnished on the first floor as a simple home of a mid-nineteenth century craftsman. It has a centered entry door with a single window on the side. The hall house is one room deep and is of post and beam construction. The house comes with a full attic and a raised cellar. It is about twenty one and a half feet wide and seventeen and a half feet deep. The west side elevation is centered with an end gable exterior sandstone chimney. It has an enclosed cellar entry with a shed roof.

The typical single residence one story pedimented house has an entry porch at the center entry. It is sheathed in unpainted weatherboards with five to five and a half inch exposure. The gable roof is covered with round-butt wood shingles with box cornice and crown moulding at the eaves and simple rake with ogee moulding at the gable ends. The first floor windows are 6/6 double hung sashes without shutters. A similar 6/9 double hung sash window is on the principal floor. The attic story on the gable ends has four-light upward-swinging casement sashes. The basement sashes are four-light hoppers.

The rear door on the south side has a centered four-paneled door providing to the first floor and another pair of cellar casements of three light. The front entrance on the north side has a porch with facing pediment covered in clapboards with two six-inch square posts and two six foot by three inch pilasters, simple one foot by three-quarter inch balusters. It has a heavy rounded rail on the side only and four riser steps. Flanking the porch to the west is a 6/9 sash window. No windows have shutters. The interior has been restored, however due to its age it has little integrity. The structure exterior was restored in 1963.

== Interior ==
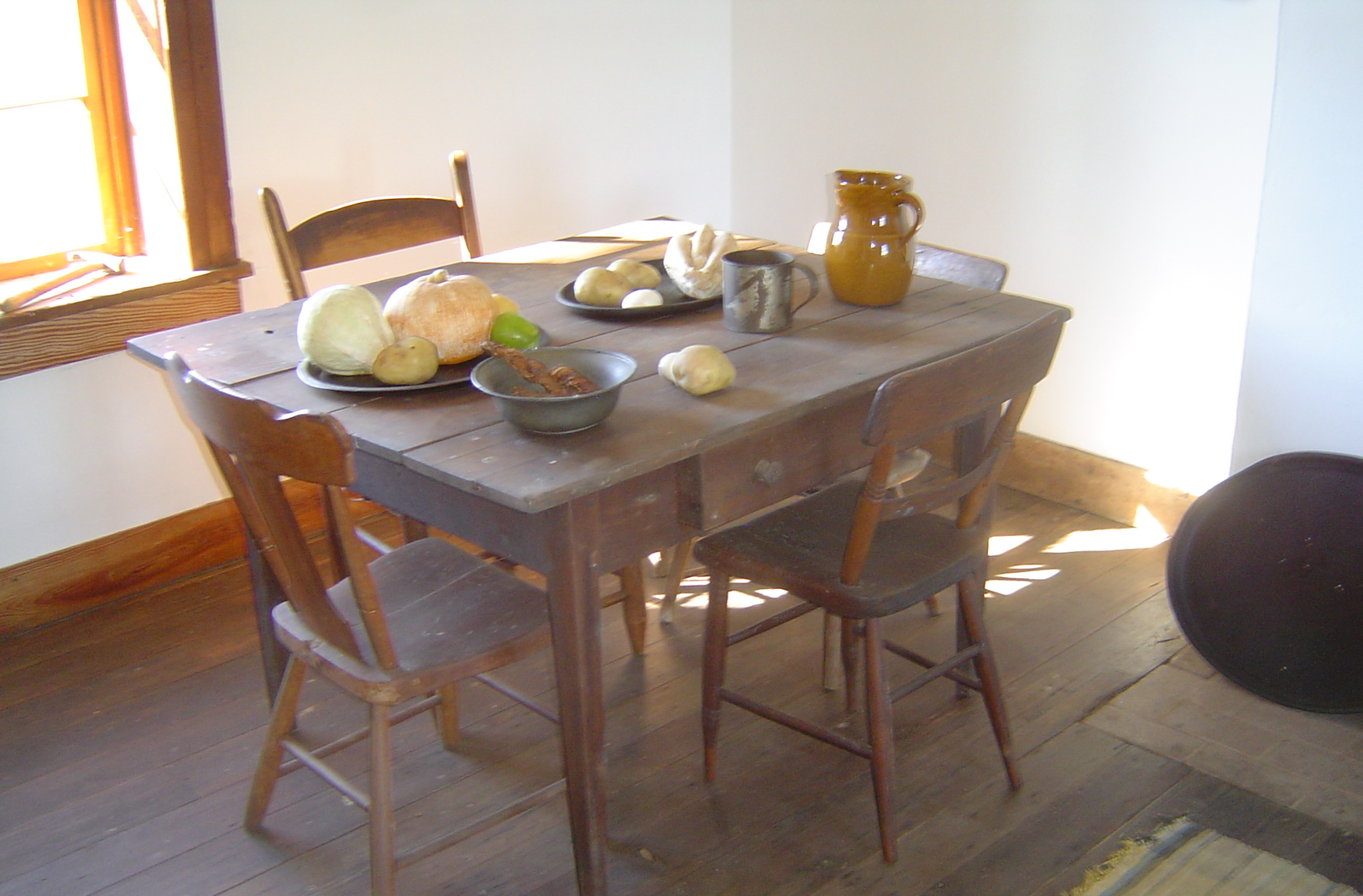
Eating area

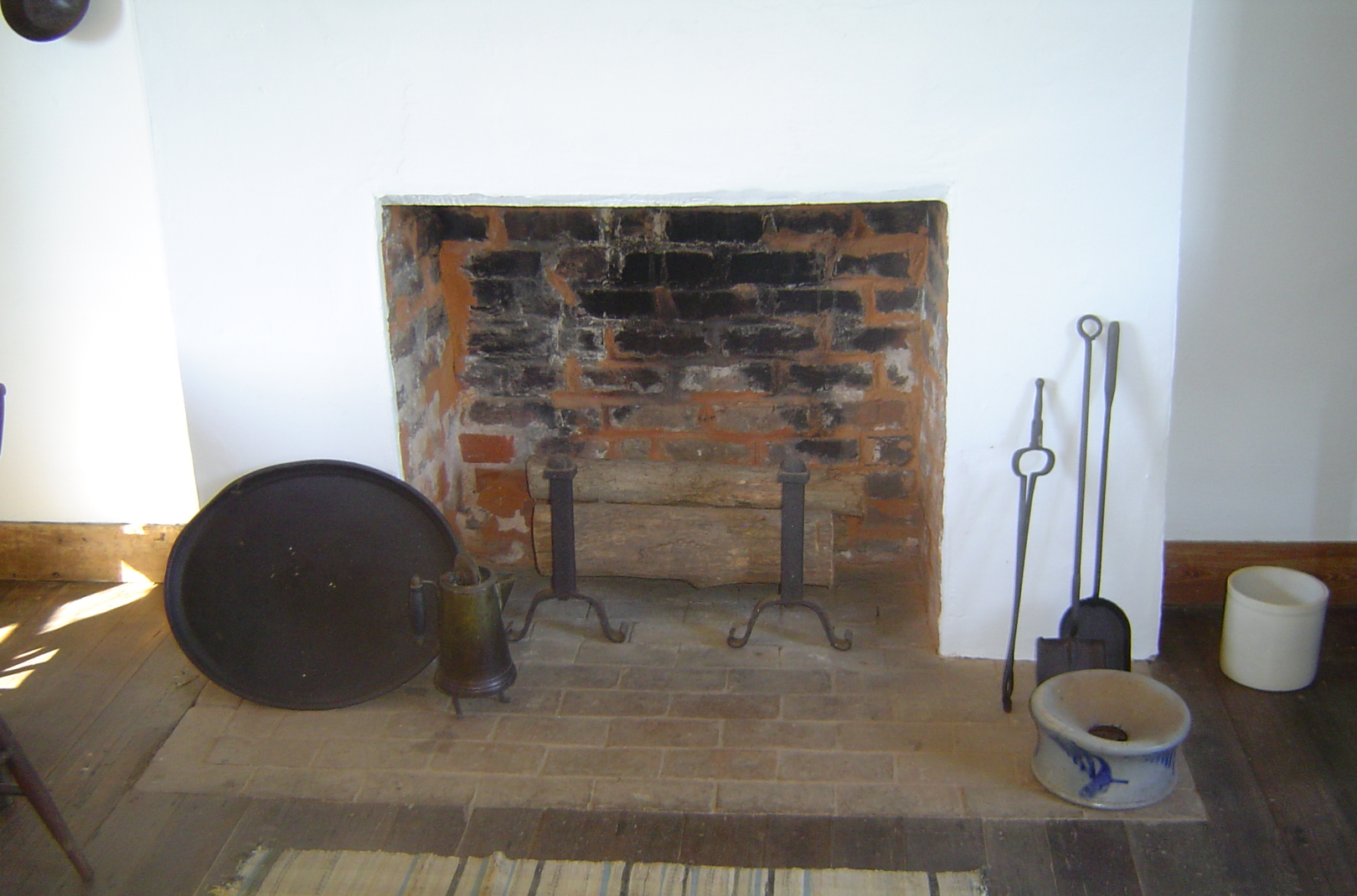
Fireplace central heating

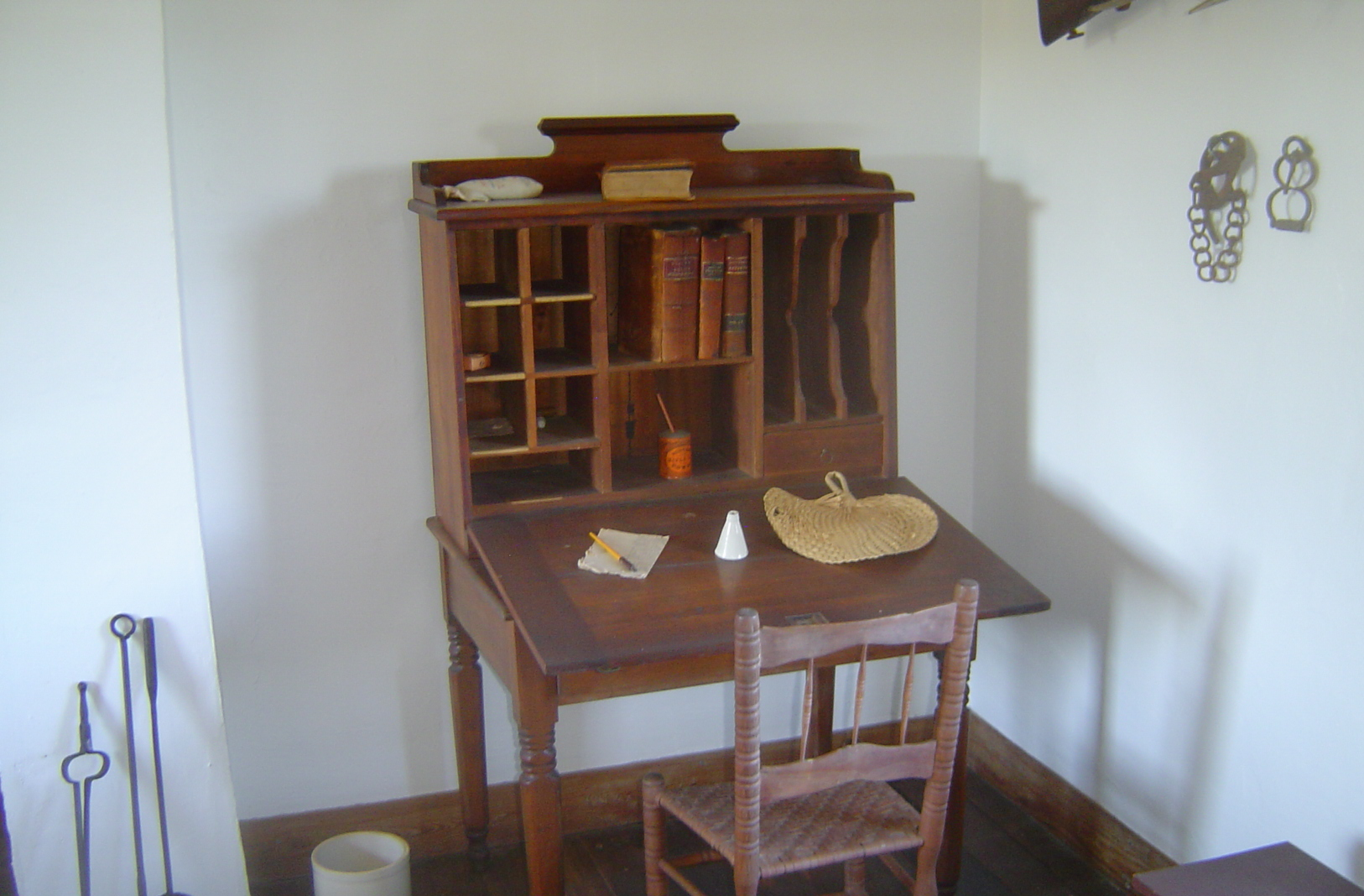
Attorney's desk

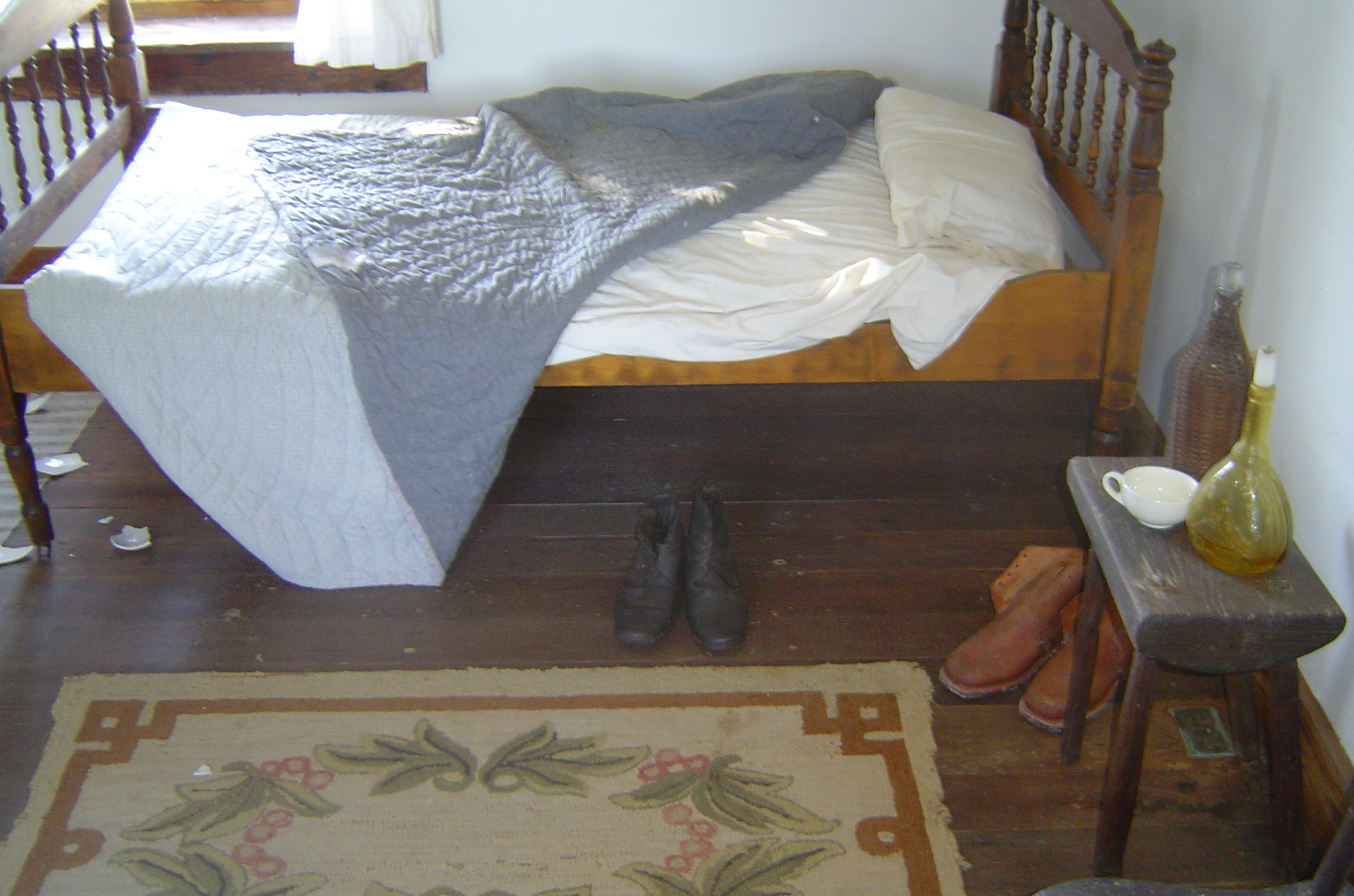
Sleeping quarters

== Sources ==
- Bradford, Ned, Battles and Leaders of the Civil War, Plume, 1989
- Catton, Bruce, A Stillness at Appomattox, Doubleday 1953, Library of Congress # 53-9982, ISBN 0-385-04451-8
- Catton, Bruce, This Hallowed Ground, Doubleday 1953, Library of Congress # 56-5960
- Chaffin, Tom, 2006. Sea of Gray: The Around-the-World Odyssey of the Confederate Raider Shenandoah, Hill and Wang/Farrar, Straus and Giroux,.
- Davis, Burke, The Civil War: Strange & Fascinating Facts, Wings Books, 1960 & 1982, ISBN 0-517-37151-0
- Davis, Burke, To Appomattox - Nine April Days, 1865, Eastern Acorn Press, 1992, ISBN 0-915992-17-5
- Featherston, Nathaniel Ragland, Appomattox County History and Genealogy, Genealogical Publishing Company, 1998, ISBN 0-8063-4760-0
- Gutek, Patricia, Plantations and Outdoor Museums in America's Historic South, University of South Carolina Press, 1996, ISBN 1-57003-071-5
- Hosmer, Charles Bridgham, Preservation Comes of Age: From Williamsburg to the National Trust, 1926-1949, Preservation Press, National Trust for Historic Preservation in the United States by the University Press of Virginia, 1981
- Kaiser, Harvey H., The National Park Architecture Sourcebook, Princeton Architectural Press, 2008, ISBN 1-56898-742-0
- Kennedy, Frances H., The Civil War Battlefield Guide, Houghton Mifflin Company, 1990, ISBN 0-395-52282-X
- Korn, Jerry et al., The Civil War, Pursuit to Appomattox, The Last Battles, Time-Life Books, 1987, ISBN 0-8094-4788-6
- Marvel, William, A Place Called Appomattox, UNC Press, 2000, ISBN 0-8078-2568-9
- Marvel, William, Lee's Last Retreat, UNC Press, 2006, ISBN 0-8078-5703-3
- McPherson, James M., Battle Cry of Freedom, Oxford University Press, 1988,
- National Park Service, Appomattox Court House: Appomattox Court House National Historical Park, Virginia, U.S. Dept. of the Interior, 2002, ISBN 0-912627-70-0
- Tidwell, William A., April '65: Confederate Covert Action in the American Civil War, Kent State University Press, 1995, ISBN 0-87338-515-2
- Weigley, Russel F., A Great Civil War: A Military and Political History, 1861-1865, Indiana University Press, 2000, ISBN 0-253-33738-0
