= Arc-length method =

Numerical method for structural analysis

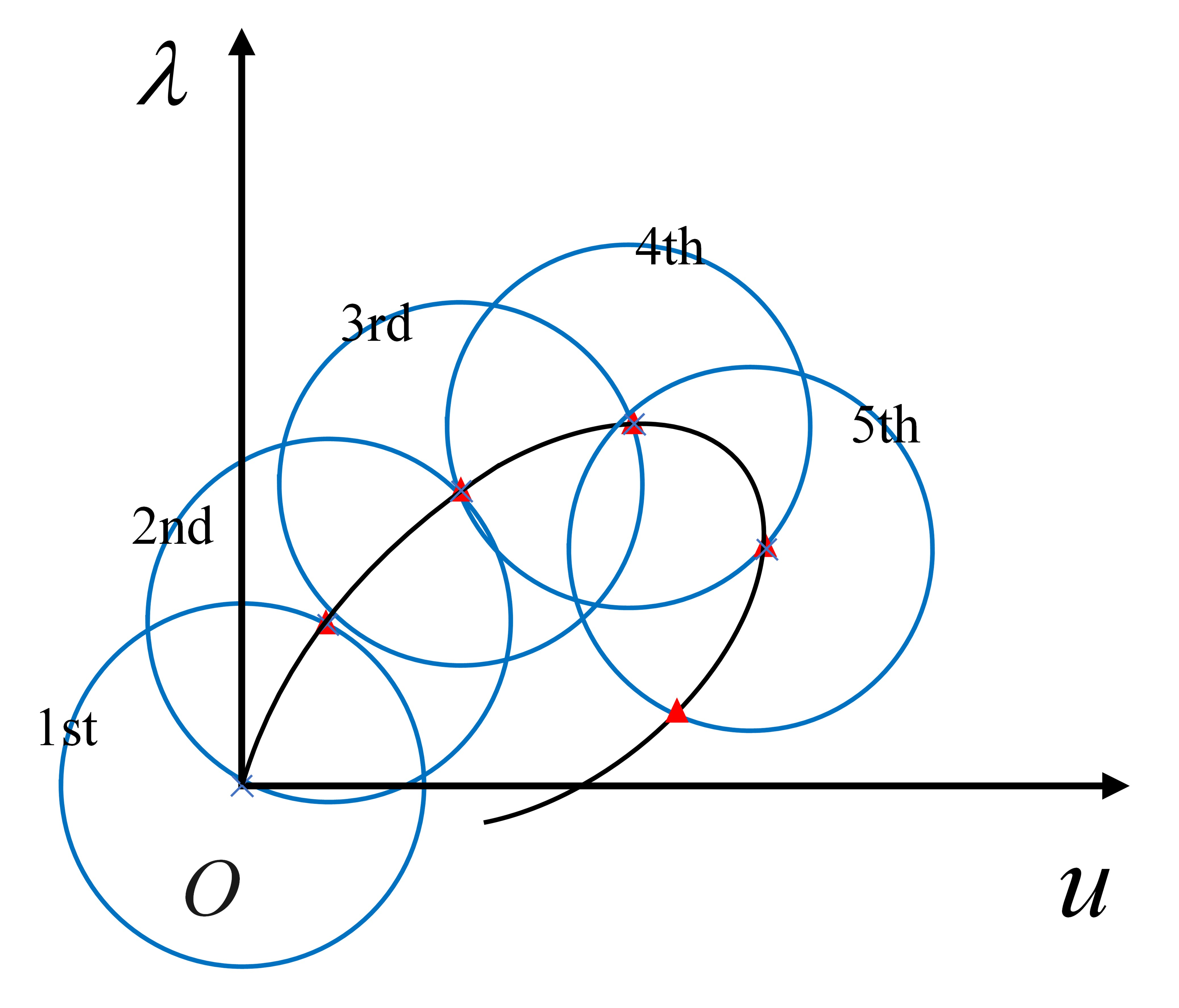
Illustration of arc-length method to trace a nonlinear equilibrium path

In numerical analysis and computational mechanics, the arc-length method, also known as the Riks method, is a numerical method for nonlinear structural analysis in which the structural response does not necessarily increase as the applied load increases, and may instead decrease. By treating both the structural response and the applied load as unknowns, the method enables equilibrium solutions to be continued beyond limit points, at which the applied load changes from increasing to decreasing or vice versa.

The arc-length method was developed independently by Wempner and Riks in the 1970s and was later reformulated by Crisfield. This method has been implemented in finite element software packages for nonlinear structural analysis such as post-buckling, strain softening, and fracture. Step-length control, root selection criteria, and branch-switching techniques for tracing multiple equilibrium solutions are important aspects of improving the numerical performance of the method.

== Basic theory ==
In the arc-length method, an equilibrium state is described by the displacement vector $\mathbf{u}$ and the load parameter $\lambda$. The displacement vector contains one or more displacement variables. The load parameter $\lambda$ is a scalar multiplier that scales the reference load to represent the actual applied load level. The objective of the arc-length method is to find the equilibrium states at which the internal and external forces are balanced. When the equilibrium condition is not satisfied, the imbalance is represented by the following residual equation
$$\mathbf{R}(\mathbf{u},\lambda)
=
\mathbf{R}^{\mathrm{int}}(\mathbf{u})
-
\lambda \mathbf{R}^{\mathrm{ext}}
=
\mathbf{R}^{\mathrm{int}}(\mathbf{u})
-
\lambda \mathbf{F}
=
\mathbf{0}.$$
In this equation, the residual vector $\mathbf{R}(\mathbf{u},\lambda)$ measures the imbalance between the internal and external forces. The vector $\mathbf{R}^{\mathrm{int}}(\mathbf{u})$ denotes the internal force vector. The external reference load vector is $\mathbf{R}^{\mathrm{ext}}$, which is written as $\mathbf{F}$ because it remains a constant throughout the analysis. An equilibrium point is obtained when the residual vector is zero.

In conventional load-control methods, the load parameter $\lambda$ is prescribed and Newton's method may be used to solve the residual equation for the displacement vector $\mathbf{u}$. Such procedures may encounter convergence difficulties when the solution contains limit points. In the arc-length method, the displacement vector $\mathbf{u}$ and the load parameter $\lambda$ are instead both treated as unknowns. Consequently, an arc-length constraint equation is introduced in addition to the residual equation, where one form of the constraint equation is
$$\Delta\mathbf{u}^{\mathrm{T}}\Delta\mathbf{u}
+
\Phi\Delta\lambda^{2}
\left(\mathbf{F}^{\mathrm{T}}\mathbf{F}\right)
=
\Delta s^{2}.$$
In this equation, the displacement increment $\Delta\mathbf{u}$ and the load increment $\Delta\lambda$ are measured within a solution step, and the arc-length increment, also known as the step length, is $\Delta s$. The values $\Phi=0$ and $\Phi=1$ correspond to the cylindrical and spherical forms of the constraint, respectively. An alternative form omits the scaling by the reference load vector
$$\Delta\mathbf{u}^{\mathrm{T}}\Delta\mathbf{u}
+
\Phi\Delta\lambda^{2}
=
\Delta s^{2}.$$
Geometrically, the arc-length constraint defines a hypersurface in the combined displacement–load space spanned by the displacement vector $\mathbf{u}$ and the load parameter $\lambda$. At each solution step, the equilibrium point is obtained from the intersection of this hypersurface with the equilibrium path, which consists of a continuous set of equilibrium points. Because the load parameter is allowed to increase or decrease during the solution process, the method can continue tracing the equilibrium path beyond limit points.

== Predictor-corrector procedure ==
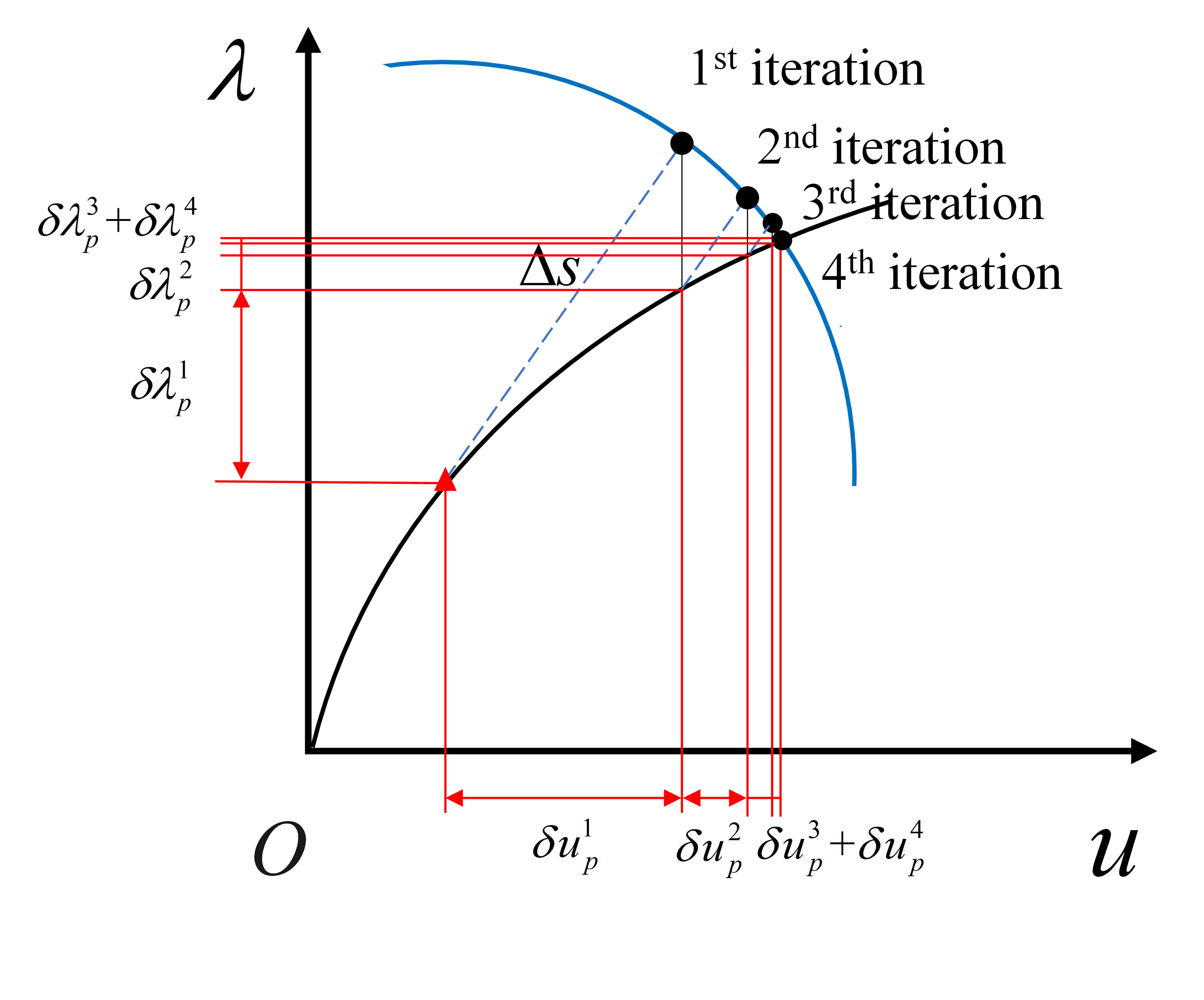
Incremental-iterative procedure of the arc-length method using a Quasi-Newton's method

In the arc-length method, each solution step consists of a predictor stage followed by a corrector stage, where one or more iterations are performed. Starting from a known equilibrium point $(\mathbf{u}_p,\lambda_p)$ of the $p$-th solution step, the predictor provides an initial estimate of the next equilibrium point, after which the corrector iteratively refines the estimate until a user-defined convergence criterion is achieved. Newton's method is used to solve the augmented nonlinear system formed by the residual equation and the arc-length constraint equation during each iteration.

Using a first-order Taylor series expansion about the current iteration point $(\mathbf{u}_p^{i},\lambda_p^{i})$, the residual equation evaluated at $(\mathbf{u}_p^{i+1},\lambda_p^{i+1})$ is approximated as
$$\mathbf{R}\!\left(\mathbf{u}_{p}^{\,i+1},\,\lambda_{p}^{\,i+1}\right)
\approx
\mathbf{R}^{\mathrm{int}}\!\left(\mathbf{u}_{p}^{\,i}\right)
+
\left[\mathbf{K}_{\mathrm{T}}\right]_{\mathbf{u}_{p}^{\,i}}
\,
\delta\mathbf{u}_{p}^{\,i+1}
-
\left(\lambda_{p}^{\,i}
+
\delta\lambda_{p}^{\,i+1}\right)
\mathbf{F}
=
\mathbf{0}.$$
In this equation, the tangent stiffness matrix evaluated at the current iteration point is $\left[\mathbf{K}_{\mathrm{T}}\right]_{\mathbf{u}_{p}^{\,i}}$. The displacement correction $\delta\mathbf{u}_{p}^{\,i+1}$ and the load correction $\delta\lambda_{p}^{\,i+1}$ are determined during the current iteration.

Following Crisfield's reformulation, the above linearized equilibrium equation is rewritten as
$$\delta\mathbf{u}_{p}^{\,i+1}
=
-
\left[\mathbf{K}_{\mathrm{T}}\right]_{\mathbf{u}_{p}^{\,i}}^{-1}
\left[
\mathbf{R}^{\mathrm{int}}\!\left(\mathbf{u}_{p}^{\,i}\right)
-
\lambda_{p}^{\,i}\mathbf{F}
\right]
+
\delta\lambda_{p}^{\,i+1}
\left[\mathbf{K}_{\mathrm{T}}\right]_{\mathbf{u}_{p}^{\,i}}^{-1}
\mathbf{F}.$$
Substituting the above equation into the arc-length constraint equation yields a quadratic equation in $\delta\lambda_p^{i+1}$
$$a(\delta\lambda_{p}^{\,i+1})^{2}
+
2b(\delta\lambda_{p}^{\,i+1})
+
c
=
0,$$
where $a$, $b$, and $c$ are the coefficients of the quadratic equation.

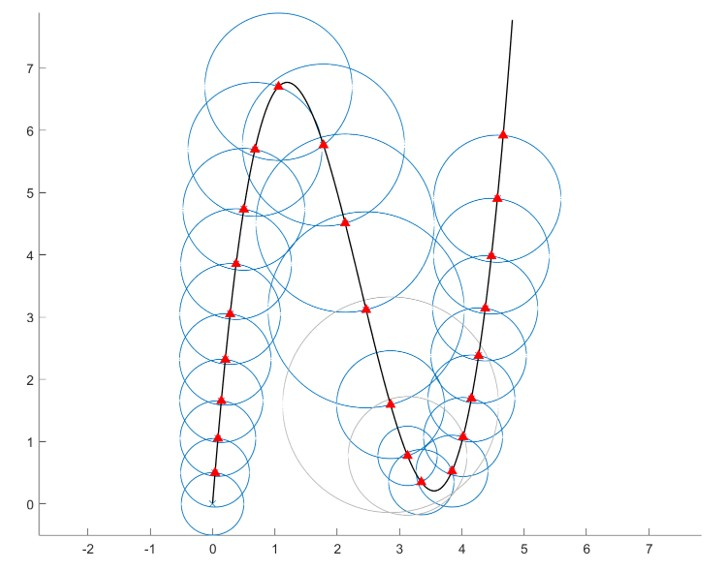
Arc-Length Method Code Demonstration for Tracing the Equilibrium Path with Two Limit Points

The roots of the quadratic equation are given by the quadratic formula
$$\delta\lambda_{p}^{\,i+1}
=
\frac{
-b
\pm
\sqrt{b^{2}-ac}
}{a},
\qquad
\text{when }
b^{2}-ac>0.$$
The quadratic equation has two roots. The root corresponding to the forward search direction is selected using one of several root-selection criteria. Substituting the selected value of $\delta\lambda_{p}^{i+1}$ into the linearized equilibrium equation gives the displacement correction for the current iteration.

Repeating the procedure for successive solution steps produces a sequence of equilibrium points
$$(\mathbf{u}_1,\lambda_1),
(\mathbf{u}_2,\lambda_2),
(\mathbf{u}_3,\lambda_3),\ldots$$
along the equilibrium path.

== Limitations ==
Although the arc-length method enables equilibrium paths to be traced beyond limit points, several numerical issues remain in practical applications. These include initialization of the first solution step, where the initial step length and predictor direction must be specified; selection of the step length, which influences both convergence and computational cost; root selection for the arc-length constraint equation, which generally produces two candidate roots; branch switching at bifurcation points, since the method follows a single equilibrium branch by default; and convergence of the iterative solution, which depends on the predictor, the tangent stiffness matrix, and the characteristics of the nonlinear problem.

== Variants and extensions ==
Several variants of the arc-length method have been developed to improve numerical performance in nonlinear analysis.

Various root-selection criteria have been proposed to select the root corresponding to the forward search direction rather than the previously traced path segment. Adaptive step-length strategies adjust the arc-length increment according to the convergence behaviour of previous solution steps in order to improve computational efficiency and robustness. To trace multiple equilibrium branches, the arc-length method can be combined with branch-switching techniques based on eigenvalue analysis or perturbation methods.

Despite these developments, most variants are based on the same underlying idea and mainly differ in the formulation of the constraint equation, predictor strategy, root-selection criterion, and step-length control.

== Applications ==
The arc-length method is used in nonlinear structural and solid mechanics problems in which the displacement does not always increase as the applied load increases. In these problems, the applied load may decrease while the displacement continues to increase, or the response may pass through snap-through or snap-back regions, where the structural response changes rapidly after a limit point is reached, or the applied load decreases while the displacement continues to increase.

One common application is the post-buckling analysis of structural components such as plates, shells, and cylindrical panels. After the critical buckling load is reached, the structure may continue to deform along a post-buckling equilibrium path. The arc-length method is used in this context to compute the post-buckling response beyond the critical load.

The method is also used in snap-through analysis of shallow arches, shells, and other structures with geometrically nonlinear behaviour. In snap-through problems, the structure may rapidly move from one equilibrium configuration to another. Because the load–displacement curve can contain limit points, the arc-length method is used to trace the equilibrium path through these regions.

Variants of the arc-length method have also been applied to material nonlinearities, including strain softening, damage, and fracture problems. In these applications, loss of stiffness or crack growth can produce snap-back behaviour on the equilibrium solution. The method is therefore used to continue the numerical solution after the peak load, when the structure or material continues to deform under a decreasing load.

In finite element software, arc-length procedures are implemented under names such as Static Riks, Riks , or arc-length control. These procedures are used mainly for quasi-static nonlinear analyses involving instability, large deformation, material softening, or fracture.

== See also ==
- Newton's method
- Nonlinear finite element analysis
- Structural stability
- Numerical continuation
- Post-buckling analysis
