= Bowyer-Smyth baronets =

Baronetcy in the Baronetage of England

- Escutcheon of the Bowyer-Smyth baronets of Hill Hall
- Creation date: 1661
- Created by: Charles II
- Peerage: Peerage of England
- First holder: Sir Thomas Smyth, 1st Baronet
- Present holder: Sir Thomas Weyland Bowyer-Smyth, 15th Baronet
- Former seat: Hill Hall
- Motto: Qua potet lucet, He shines whenever possible

The Smith, later Smyth, Smijth, Bowyer-Smijth and Bowyer-Smyth, baronetcy, of Hill Hall in the County of Essex, was created on 28 November 1661 for Thomas Smith. The current holder is the fifteenth Baronet, who doesn't use the title.

== History ==
Thomas Smith, the 1st baronet, was the grand-nephew and eventual heir to Sir Thomas Smith, the Secretary of State during the reigns of King Edward VI and Queen Elizabeth I, three-time Ambassador to France and Chancellor of the Order of the Garter. On the secretary's death without a direct, legitimate heir, his estate was inherited by his brother George Smith, a London draper. George's son Sir William Smith, of Hill Hall, the baronet's father, was a colonel in the Army in Ireland, and was later sent by King James I to Spain with the Ambassador. He also served as Sheriff of Essex, and . He married in 1590 Bridget, the daughter of Thomas Fleetwood, Master of the Mint.

Thomas Smith, third and youngest son of Sir William Smith, was admitted to study law at Gray's Inn in 1619/20, and inherited the family estates on the death of a nephew. He was created a baronet 28 November 1661, and served as Sheriff of Essex in 1663–1664. He died 5 May 1668 and was buried at Theydon Mount, Essex, his monument bearing the 'Smyth' spelling used for the next several generations by his descendants.

Sir Edward Smyth, second but first surviving son of Thomas, was admitted to Gray's Inn in 1656/7 and succeeded his father, becoming second Baronet in 1668. He was High Sheriff of Essex, 1680–1, dying 24 June 1713. He was succeeded by his only son, another Sir Edward Smyth, who died 16 August 1744, to be followed by three sons in succession: Sir Edward (died 1760; Sir Charles, Sheriff of Essex 1760–1, died 1773; and Sir William, died 1777, who had attended Trinity College, Cambridge and was rector of Stapleford Tawney and Theydon Mount before succeeding to the baronetcy.

Sir William Smyth, son of the last, became seventh Baronet on the death of his father, and adopted the affected spelling of 'Smijth' by 1799. He married Anne Windham, daughter and eventual heiress of John Windham, later Windham-Bowyer, dying in 1823. Again, the baronetcy would be inherited by three sons in succession, Sir Thomas, who died unmarried in 1833, Sir John, a Commander in the Royal Navy, who likewise died unmarried in 1838, and Sir Edward. Sir Edward, the tenth Baronet, attended Trinity College, becoming vicar of Camberwell, and Chaplain to King George IV. Having inherited his mother's Windham and Bowyer inheritances, in 1839 he adopted by Royal licence the surname of Bowyer-Smijth, dying 1850.

His son Sir William Bowyer-Smith, the eleventh Baronet, sat as member of parliament for South Essex from 1852 to 1857. He died in 1883 and was succeeded by his son, Sir William, the twelfth Baronet, who was in the Diplomatic Service and also served as Sheriff of Essex in 1889, dying childless in 1916. The baronetcy then reverted to a first cousin, Alfred Bowyer-Smijth, eldest son of Reverend Alfred John Edward Bowyer-Smijth, younger son of the tenth Baronet, who thus became the thirteenth Baronet. In 1916 he abandoned the affected spelling of his family surname, adopting Bowyer-Smyth. He died childless in 1927 and was succeeded by his nephew, Philip, the son of Clement Weyland Bowyer-Smijth.

Sir Philip Bowyer-Smyth, the fourteenth Baronet, was born in Sydney, Australia in 1894. He joined the Royal Navy in 1906, five years before the creation of an Australian navy, and served in World War I and World War II. He was the Naval Attache at Rome from 1938 to 1940, and he commanded the Australian warship HMAS Perth from 1940 to 1941. He was Director of radio equipment for the Admiralty from 1943 to 1944, and then Commodore of East Africa from 1945 until 1946 when he became Aide-de-Camp to King George VI. He died in November 1978.

The current Baronet, Sir Thomas Weyland Bowyer-Smyth, is married to director Mary "Coky" Giedroyc, sister of TV personality Mel Giedroyc.

== Smith (later Smyth, Smijth, Bowyer-Smijth and Bowyer-Smyth) baronets, of Hill Hall (1661) ==
- Sir Thomas Smyth, 1st Baronet (c. 1602–1668)
- Sir Edward Smyth, 2nd Baronet (1637–1713)
- Sir Edward Smyth, 3rd Baronet (1686–1744)
- Sir Edward Smyth, 4th Baronet (1710–1760)
- Sir Charles Smyth, 5th Baronet (1711–1773)
- Sir William Smyth, 6th Baronet (c. 1719–1777)
- Sir William Smijth, 7th Baronet (1746–1823)
- Sir Thomas Smijth, 8th Baronet (1781–1833)
- Sir John Smijth, 9th Baronet (1782–1838)
- Sir Edward Bowyer-Smijth, 10th Baronet (1785–1850)
- Sir William Bowyer-Smijth, 11th Baronet (1814–1883)
- Sir William Bowyer-Smijth, 12th Baronet (1840–1916)
- Sir Alfred John Bowyer-Smyth, 13th Baronet (1850–1927)
- Sir Philip Weyland Bowyer-Smyth, 14th Baronet (1894–1978)
- Sir Thomas Weyland Bowyer-Smyth, 15th Baronet (born 1960)

== See also ==
- Smith baronets
