= Horham Hall =

Manor house in Essex, England

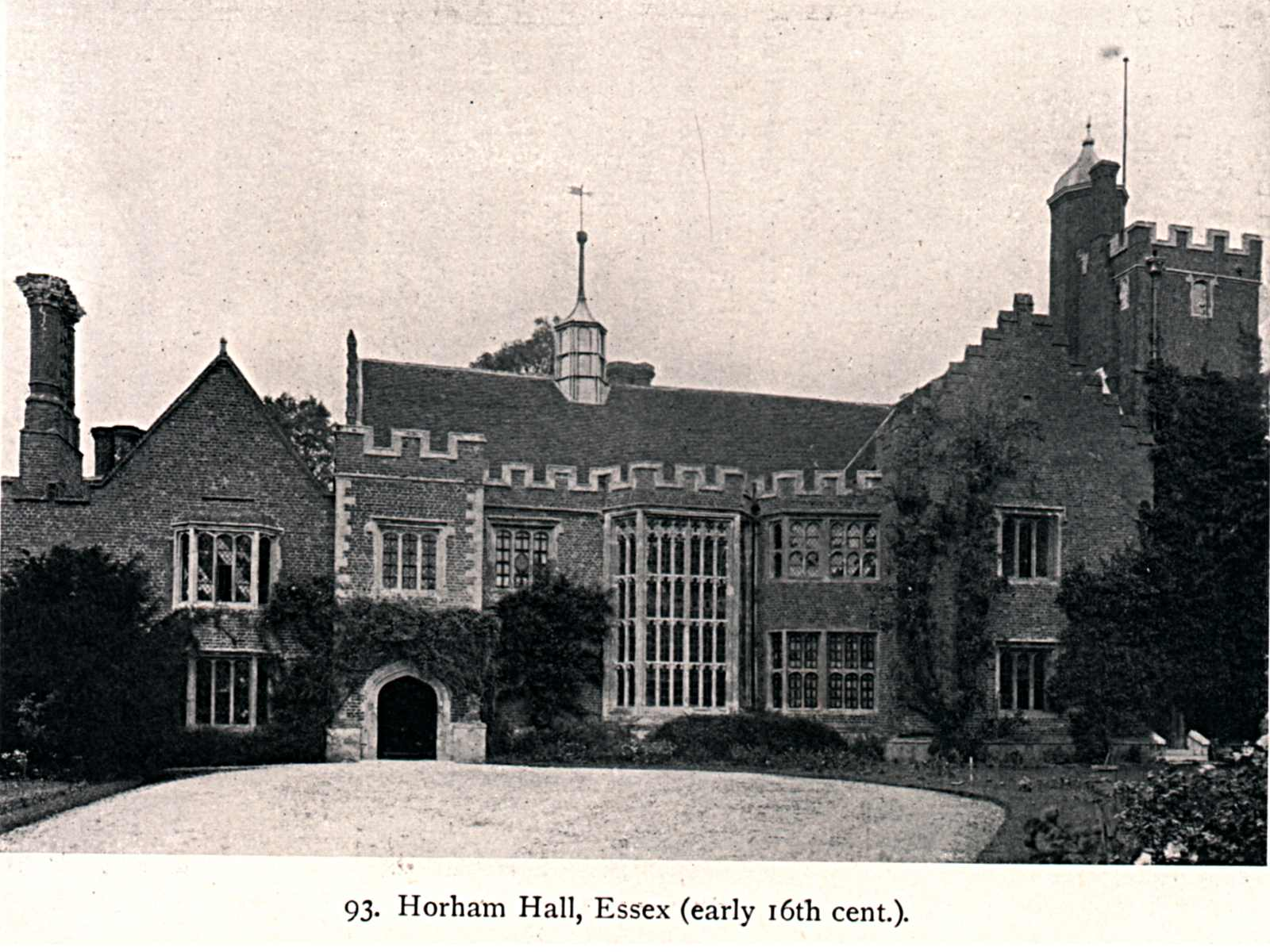
- Photograph of Horham Hall from The Growth of the English House by John Alfred Gotch, 1909

Additional information
Location within Essex
51°56′26″N 0°18′34″E
Type	Manor house
Location	On the boundary between Thaxted and Broxted in Essex
Site notes
Area	51,000 square feet (4,700 m^{2})
Architectural styles	Tudor and Jacobean
Listed Building – Grade I
Official name	Horham Hall
Designated	7 February 1952
Reference no.	1322572
Listed Building – Grade I
Official name	Horham Hall
Designated	7 February 1952
Reference no.	1165290

Horham Hall may refer to the timber-framed late medieval hall in Thaxted, England, or to the brick hall built in its place by Sir John Cutte (died 1520) in the early 16th century.

The original hall was a timber-framed moated manor house circa 1470 but it was largely demolished by Cutte, who built the present house between 1510 and 1515. Cutte was under-treasurer in the households of Henry VII and Henry VIII. The mansion was built in brick in two storeys in a quadrilateral layout with a gatehouse and incorporated some elements of the former building.

The house was visited by Elizabeth I, both as a princess and twice as queen (1571 and 1578) as the guest of Sir John Cutte (1545–1615). It is believed that the Tower was built for her to watch the local hunt. It was while staying at Horham in 1578 that the Queen received the envoy of the Duke of Alençon proposing marriage. She responded by inviting her to court her in person. During her 1571 visit, the court was agitated by the discovery of a plot to place Mary, Queen of Scots, on the throne.

At its height, Horham Hall was a much larger building than the present structure. Parts of the complex, including the chapel, were demolished in succeeding centuries, but the remaining building was restored in 1840–1850.

The estate was sold by Sir John Cutte (c. 1581 – 1646) in 1609 to Andrew Huddleston, who rapidly sold it to John Wiseman. In 1617, it passed to Sir William Smith, nephew and heir of the learned scholar and statesman Sir Thomas Smith of Hill Hall, Theydon Mount, who was born in Saffron Walden. Horham remained in the possession of the Smith family until the death of the Reverend Sir Edward Bowyer-Smith, 10th Baronet, in 1850. The Smiths were seldom resident, and the architect Charles Buckler wrote in 1843: "The mansion has been uninhabited for about 40 years but it is kept in good repair. The walls, roof, parapet and chimneys are quite entire and not one of the rooms, tho' all are unfurnished, is made ye resceptical of rubbish, even dust is denied a resting place."

The house was sold to Francis George West Esq in 1854. His son, Reverend George West, is commemorated by a tall cross in Thaxted churchyard. In 1905, the house was again sold to Alfred Paget Humphry, a barrister and famous rifle sharpshooter. His daughter married the then vicar of Thaxted, Revd. Leonard Sedgwick Westall, in 1909. Humphry's widow lived in the house until the war.

During the Second World War, the house was used as a Barnardo's evacuation centre for girls and young children. After the war, the house was acquired by Arctic explorer and war hero, Sir George Binney DSO (1900–1972).

In 1968 the estate land, which consisted of several farms, was sold off and the hall itself purchased by Michael Ward-Thomas and his wife, the novelist Evelyn Anthony. Ward-Thomas sold the house in 1976, due to the excessive maintenance costs. Very extensive major work and entirely contemporary repairs on the house and facilities were carried out by Mr Sandy Shand prior to the Ward-Thomas family returning to Horham Hall in 1982. Evelyn Anthony remained at the Hall until her death in 2018.

The Hall is a Grade I listed building.

== Features ==
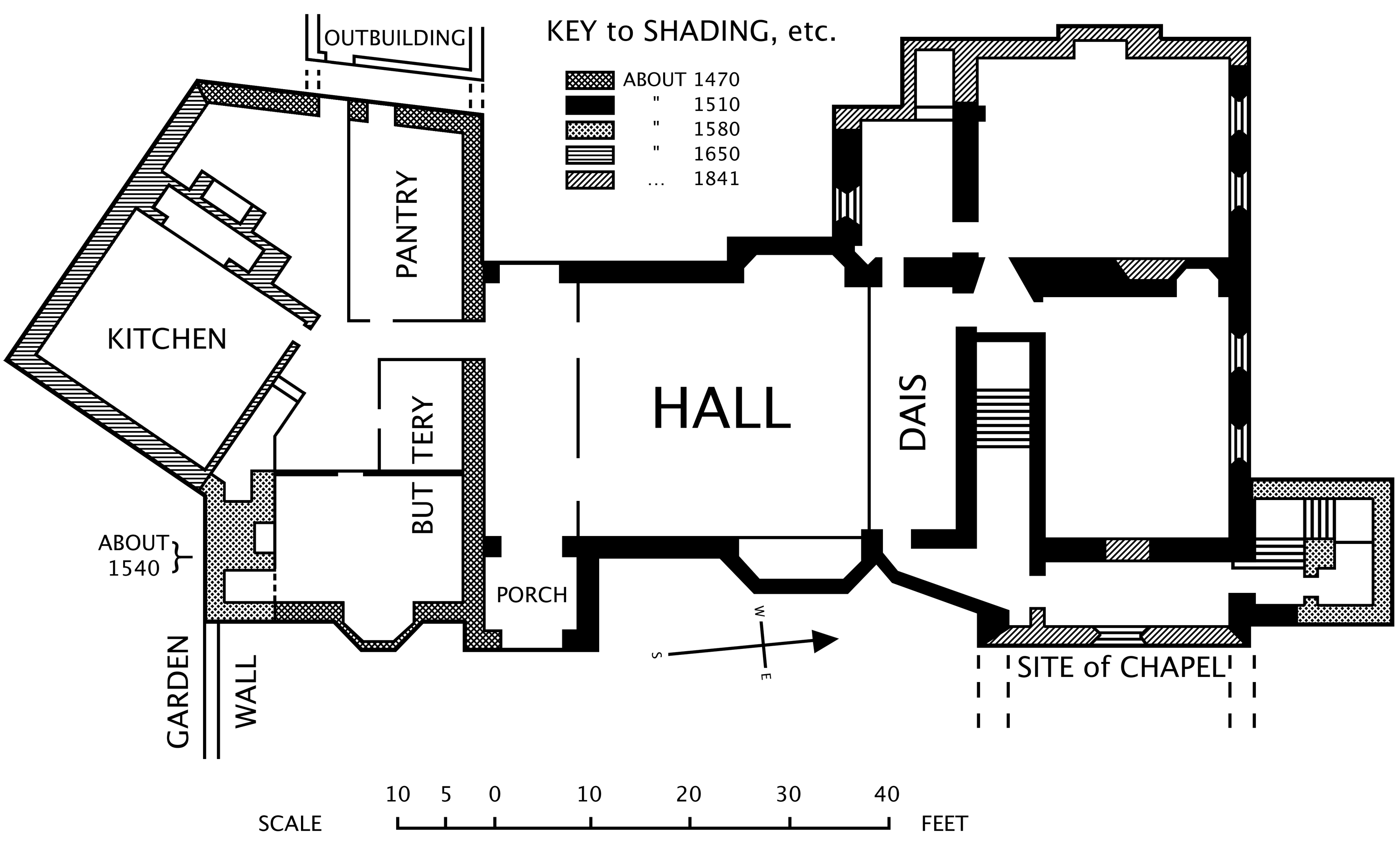

All of the typical features of a hall house are still present: a screens passage, above the porch in the plan; a dais; a buttery and a pantry; a bay window (not essential, but very common). The main staircase is at the dais end, and the Great Hall rises to the full height of the house, which otherwise has two storeys. The Great Hall has a fine oriel window and there is a staircase tower on the north side.
