= Mount End =

Hamlet in Epping Forest, Essex, England

Coordinates: 51.6873°N 0.1516°E

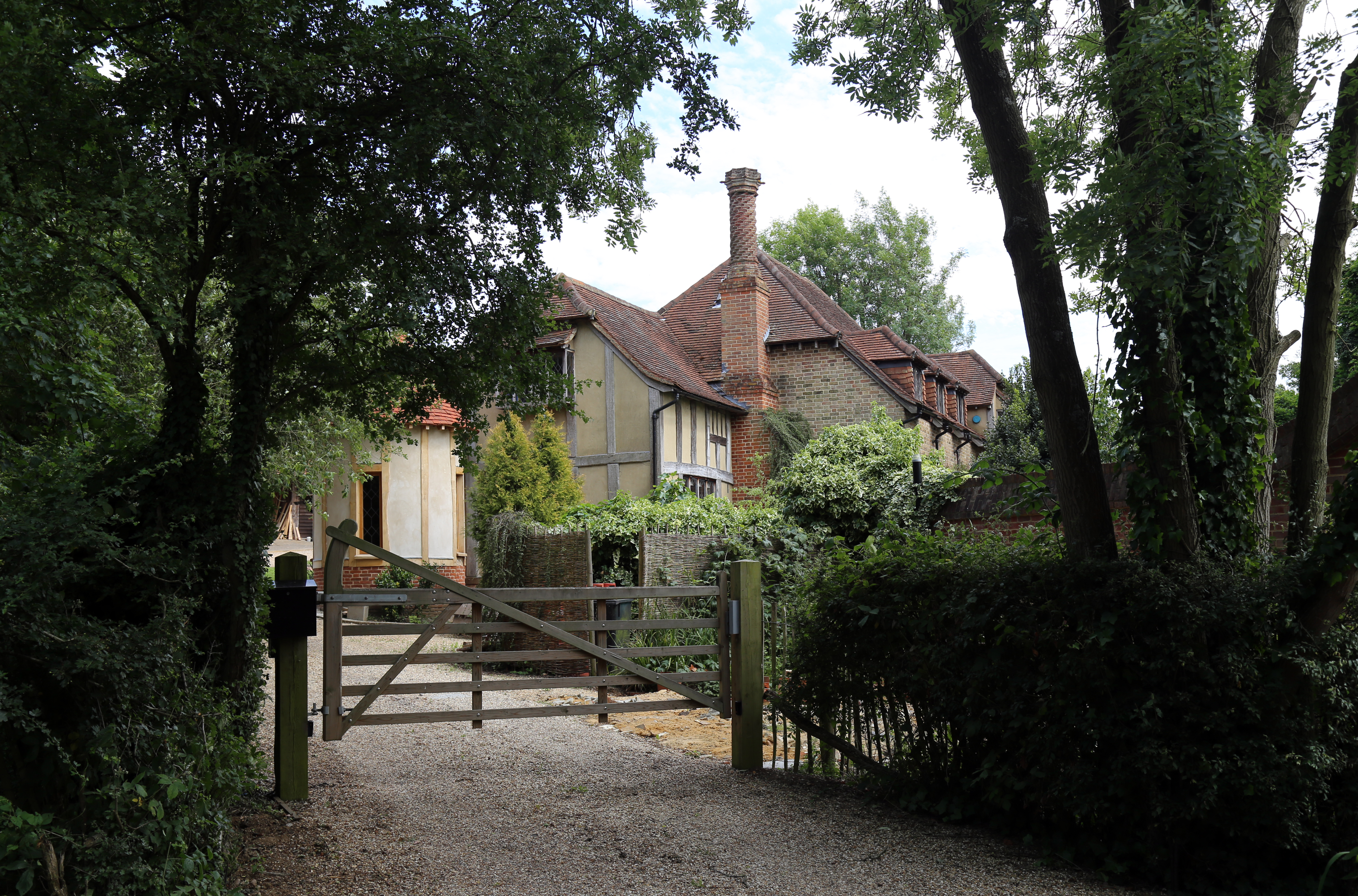

- Location within Essex
- Civil parish: Theydon Mount
- District: Epping Forest
- Shire county: Essex
- Region: East
- Country: England
- Sovereign state: United Kingdom

Mount End is a hamlet in the civil parish of Theydon Mount, in the Epping Forest district, in the county of Essex, England.

== Transport ==
Mount End is near the M25 and M11 motorways. Nearby settlements include the town of Epping, the village of Theydon Mount, and the hamlets of Colliers Hatch and Fiddlers Hamlet. Mount End is on a Roman Road.
