= Sir Edward Bowyer-Smijth, 10th Baronet =

British clergyman (1785–1850)

The Reverend Sir Edward Smyth, Bt
- Born: 1 March 1785; Marylebone, London
- Died: 15 August 1850 (aged 65); Hill Hall, Theydon Mount
- Education: Eton College; Trinity College, Cambridge
- Spouse: Laetitia Cecily Weyland (after 1813)
- Parent(s): Sir William Smijth, 7th Baronet; Anne Windham
- Relatives: Sir William Smyth, 6th Baronet (grandfather); Sir William Bowyer-Smijth, 12th Baronet (grandson); Alfred Jodrell (grandson); Evelyn Ruggles-Brise (grandson); Harold Goodeve Ruggles-Brise (grandson)

Sir Edward Bowyer-Smijth, 10th Baronet (1 March 1785 – 15 August 1850) was a British clergyman who was chaplain to King George IV.

== Early life ==
He was born on 1 March 1785 on Margaret Street in Marylebone, London as Edward Smyth. He was a younger son of Sir William Smijth, 7th Baronet and Anne Windham. In 1796, his name was changed to Smijth. Among his siblings were Sir Thomas, who died unmarried in 1833, and Sir John, a Commander in the Royal Navy, who likewise died unmarried in 1838.

His paternal grandparents were Sir William Smyth, 6th Baronet and the former Abigail Wood. His maternal grandparents were John Windham (later Windham-Bowyer) and Mary Windham (a daughter of Joseph Windham-Ashe).

He was educated at Eton College and graduated from Trinity College, Cambridge with a Bachelor of Arts in 1807, and a Master of Arts in 1811.

== Career ==
Escutcheon of the Bowyer-Smyth baronets of Hill Hall

Having been vicar in Camberwell, Surrey in 1809, Bowyer-Smijth became chaplain to King George IV. From 1837 to 1838, he was rector in Theydon Mount and Stapleford Tawney in Essex. He succeeded to his older brother's baronetcy on 9 December 1838.

After inheritin his mother's Windham and Bowyer inheritances, he further changed his surname to Bowyer-Smijth on 10 June 1839.

== Personal life ==
On 29 May 1813, he married Laetitia Cecily Weyland at St George's, Hanover Square, London. Laetitia was the youngest daughter of John Weyland and Elizabeth (née Nourse) Weyland. They had six children, four daughters and two sons, including:

- Cicely Abigail Bowyer-Smijth (d. 1880), who married Henry Bullock of Faulkbourne Hall in 1840. After his death, she married Edgar Bury in 1861. After his death she married Maj. James H. McEwen of the King's Own Royal Regiment, in 1874.
- Anne Elizabeth Bowyer-Smijth (d. 1888), who married Gordon Willoughby Gyll on in 1839.
- Sir William Bowyer-Smijth, 11th Baronet (1814–1883), who married Marianne Frances Meux, second daughter of Sir Henry Meux, 1st Baronet. After her death, he married Eliza Fechnie Malcolm, daughter of David Baird Malcolm.
- Adela Moncton Bowyer-Smijth (1823–1896), who married Capt. Edward Jodrell, son of Edward Jodrell, (Note: Capt. Edward Jodrell was the son of Edward Jodrell, brother to Sir Richard Paul Jodrell, 2nd Baronet and Henry Jodrell, MP for Great Yarmouth and Bramber, all sons of classical scholar and playwright Richard Paul Jodrell. The elder Edward Jodrell inherited Bayfield Hall from his brother, Henry. Adela and Capt. Edward's son, Alfred Jodrell, inherited the baronetcy and married Lady Jane Grimston, daughter of James Grimston, 2nd Earl of Verulam.) in 1843.
- Alfred John Edward Bowyer-Smijth (1825–1887), the Rector at Attleborough; he married Mary Constantia Rolt, daughter of Maj.-Gen. Sir John Rolt, in 1847.
- Marianne Weyland Bowyer-Smijth (c. 1827–1900), who married Col. Sir Samuel Ruggles-Brise of Spains Hall, MP for East Essex, in 1847.

Sir Edward died at Hill Hall, Theydon Mount, Essex on 15 August 1850. He was succeeded in the baronetcy William.

=== Descendants ===
Through his daughter Adela, he was a grandfather of Sir Alfred Jodrell, 4th Baronet, who married Lady Jane Grimston, daughter of James Grimston, 2nd Earl of Verulam.

Through his daughter Marianne, he was a grandfather of Archibald Weyland Ruggles-Brise (father of Sir Edward Ruggles-Brise, 1st Baronet), Sir Evelyn Ruggles-Brise (founder of the Borstal system), Maj.-Gen. Sir Harold Ruggles-Brise (military secretary to Sir Douglas Haig), and Beatrice Georgiana Ruggles-Brise (wife of Henry Jervis-White-Jervis).

Baronetage of England
| Preceded by John Smijth | Baronet (of Hill Hall); 1838–1850 | Succeeded by William Bowyer-Smijth |
