= Residue =

Residue may refer to:

== Chemistry and biology ==
- An amino acid, within a peptide chain
- Crop residue, materials left after agricultural processes
- Pesticide residue, refers to the pesticides that may remain on or in food after they are applied to food crops
- Petroleum residue, the heavier fractions of crude oil that fail to vaporize in an oil refinery
- Residue (chemistry), materials remaining after a physical separation process, or by-products of a chemical reaction

== Mathematics ==
- Residue (complex analysis), complex number describing the behavior of line integrals of a meromorphic function around a singularity
- Some coefficient involved in partial fraction decomposition
- A remainder in modular arithmetic

== Media ==
- Residue (TV series), an English science-fiction series from 2015
- "Residue", a song by Benjamin Clementine from And I Have Been, 2022
- A variant title of a British folk song also known as "Levy-Dew" and "New Year Carol"

== Other ==
- Residuum (geology), often used to refer to the soil and subsoil that forms as the result of long weathering over carbonate bedrock
- Residue (law), portion of the testator's estate that is not specifically devised to someone in the will
- Residual value, one of the constituents of a leasing calculus which describes the future value of a good in terms of absolute value

== See also ==
- Relic (disambiguation)
- Residual (disambiguation)
