= Evelyn Anthony =

British writer (1926–2018)

- Evelyn in 1986
- Born: Evelyn Bridget Patricia Stephens; 3 July 1926; Lambeth, London, UK
- Died: 25 September 2018 (aged 92); Horham Hall, Essex, UK
- Occupation: Novelist
- Spouse: Michael Ward-Thomas (m. 1955; died 2004)
- Children: 6
- Writing career
- Pen name: Evelyn Anthony

Evelyn Bridget Patricia Ward-Thomas (née Stephens; 3 July 1926 – 25 September 2018), better known by the pen name Evelyn Anthony, was a British writer. Anthony was born in the Lambeth district of London. She had a very prolific writing career, translated into at least 19 languages and her 1971 novel The Tamarind Seed was adapted for a film in 1974, starring Julie Andrews as Judith Farrow.

== Early life and education ==
Anthony was born Evelyn Bridget Patricia Stephens on 3 July 1926 in Lambeth, London. Her father was Henry Christian Stephens, a lieutenant in the Royal Naval Volunteer Reserve, and her mother was Elizabeth Stephens (née Sharkey). She had one older half sister, Phyllis. Her great-grandfather, Henry Stephens, invented indelible ink and the family had inherited a fortune. Her father invented the dome trainer, which allowed anti-aircraft shooters to train against projected films of aircraft.

Anthony was a keen reader as a child and attended the Convent of the Sacred Heart school in Roehampton as a boarder from the age of ten. She was evacuated to the West Country during World War II. Her parents' marriage was not happy and by the time she was 12, they had divorced. She was close to her father and when his health deteriorated within two years of the divorce, she cared for him at home.

== Literary career ==
Anthony began her writing career at seventeen, publishing short stories in women's magazines. She used the pen name Evelyn Anthony as Evelyn was gender-neutral and Anthony was derived from the name of St. Anthony of Padua, patron saint of lost things. Her first novels were historical romances, beginning with the publication of Rebel Princess in 1953, which was the first of her Romanov trilogy and focused on Catherine the Great. She also published Anne Boleyn (1957), Victoria and Albert (1958), and Anne of Austria (1968). Her historical novels Far Fly The Eagles (1955) and Valentina (1966) were both set during Napoleon's invasion of Russia.

Beginning with The Legend which she published in 1969, she focused on novels with a theme of espionage. She was one of the few women writing in the genre at the time, a group which included Helen MacInnes and Ann Bridge. She wrote a series of four novels, beginning with The Defectors (1980), which chronicled the tales of fictional female secret agent, Davina Graham, who became the MI5 director. She was influenced by friends of her father, who worked with the Special Operations Executive during World War II. One of these intelligence officers was Desmond Bristow, who inspired the novels The Rendezvous (1967) and The Poellenberg Inheritance (1972).

She published novels consistently throughout her life, until the publication of her final novel, Mind Games (2005). She was a best-selling author and her books were translated into at least nineteen languages. Her most famous novel was The Tamarind Seed (1971), which was adapted into a film of the same name in 1974, starring Julie Andrews as Judith Farrow, a British Home Office functionary and Omar Sharif as Feodor, a Soviet air attaché, lovers involved in Cold War intrigue. Two of her novels – Anne Boleyn (1956) and Victoria (1957) – won the United States Literary Guild award. The Occupying Power received the 1973 Yorkshire Post award.

== Personal life ==
Anthony met Michael Ward-Thomas, an executive for the Consolidated African Selection Trust, on a double date at The Dorchester. They were immediately attracted to each other and switched partners, marrying a few months later, on 16 April 1955. The couple had four sons and two daughters between 1957 and 1965. In 1968, the family moved to Thaxted, Essex, from London as they had purchased Horham Hall. The cost of restoration and maintenance, however, forced them to sell the manor house in 1976 and they moved to Naas, County Kildare, Ireland, where Anthony had relatives. Increased income from her writing allowed her to buy Horham Hall back in 1982, where she subsequently lived until her death.

Anthony became involved in charity work involving members of the armed forces and their families. In 1987, she was appointed as a freeman of the City of London and a liveryman of the Worshipful Company of Needlemakers. She became the first female High Sheriff of Essex in 1994. The following year, her daughter Kitty died of a heroin overdose, leading Evelyn to not write for another seven years. In 2004 her husband died of a stroke. She died from heart failure on 25 September 2018 at Horham Hall, at the age of 92.

== Partial bibliography ==
The following bibliography includes both historical novels and thrillers.

- 1953 : Rebel Princess (later reissued as Imperial Highness)
- 1954 : Curse Not the King (Museum Press)
- 1955 : Far Fly The Eagles (Museum Press)
- 1957 : Anne Boleyn
- 1958 : Victoria and Albert (Museum Press)
- 1960 : Elizabeth (Museum Press) aka All the Queen's Men (Thomas Y. Crowell)
- 1961 : Charles the King (Museum Press) (Doubleday)
- 1963 : Clandara (Hurst & Blackett)
- 1964 : The French Bride
- 1964 : The Heiress (Hurst & Blackett)
- 1966 : Valentina (Hurst & Blackett)
- 1967 : The Rendezvous
- 1968 : Anne of Austria (Hurst & Blackett)
- 1969 : The Legend
- 1970 : The Assassin (Hutchinson)
- 1971 : The Tamarind Seed (Hutchinson)
- 1972 : The Poellenberg Inheritance (Hutchinson)
- 1973 : The Occupying Power aka Stranger at the Gates (Hutchinson)
- 1974 : The Malaspiga Exit also called Mission to Malaspiga (Hutchinson)
- 1975 : The Persian Ransom (Hutchinson)
- 1977 : The Silver Falcon (Hutchinson)
- 1978 : The Return (Hutchinson)
- 1979 : The Grave of Truth (Hutchinson)
- 1980 : The Defector (Hutchinson)
- 1981 : The Avenue of the Dead (Hutchinson) (Cowrad McCann)
- 1982 : Albatross (Hutchinson)
- 1983 : The Company of Saints (Hutchinson)
- 1985 : Voices on the Wind (Hutchinson)
- 1987 : No Enemy But Time (Hutchinson)
- 1988 : The House of Vandekar (Hutchinson)
- 1989 : The Scarlet Thread (Hutchinson)
- 1991 : The Relic
- 1992 : The Doll's House (Bantam)
- 1994 : Exposure
- 1994 : The Heiress
- 1994 : Bloodstones (Bantam)
- 1997 : The Legacy (Bantam)
- 2002 : A Dubious Legacy
- 2002 : Codeword Janus
- 2003 : Sleeping with the Enemy
- 2004 : Betrayal
- 2004 : No Resistance
- 2005 : Mind Games
- 2015 : The Defector
- 2015 : The Avenue of the Dead
- 2015 : The Company of the Saints
- 2015 : Rebel Prince
