= The Tamarind Seed =

1974 film by Blake Edwards

- Theatrical release poster
- Directed by: Blake Edwards
- Screenplay by: Blake Edwards
- Based on: The Tamarind Seed by Evelyn Anthony
- Produced by: Ken Wales
- Starring: Julie Andrews; Omar Sharif; Anthony Quayle; Dan O'Herlihy; Sylvia Syms; Oskar Homolka
- Cinematography: Freddie Young
- Edited by: Ernest Walter
- Music by: John Barry
- Production companies: Lorimar; ITC Entertainment; Jewel Productions; Pimlico Films
- Distributed by: Avco Embassy Pictures (United States); Scotia-Barber (United Kingdom)
- Release dates: 11 June 1974 (New York City); 22 August 1974 (London); 23 August 1974 (United Kingdom)
- Running time: 125 minutes
- Countries: United States; United Kingdom
- Language: English
- Budget: $2.4 million
- Box office: $8 million (US and Canada) $5 million (rest of world)

The Tamarind Seed is a 1974 romantic thriller spy drama film written and directed by Blake Edwards and starring Julie Andrews and Omar Sharif. Based on the 1971 novel of the same name by Evelyn Anthony, the film is about British Home Office functionary Judith Farrow and Soviet-era attaché Feodor Sverdlov who are lovers involved in Cold War intrigue. The Tamarind Seed was the first film produced by Lorimar Productions. The film score was composed by John Barry.

== Plot ==
After the death of her husband and a failed love affair with married Royal Air Force Group Captain Richard Paterson, Judith Farrow, a British Home Office assistant, meets Soviet attaché Colonel Feodor Sverdlov while on vacation in Barbados, but their budding personal relationship does not go unnoticed by British intelligence. Judith is enchanted by a story that the seeds of a tamarind tree on a certain plantation take the form of the head of a slave hanged from a tamarind. Sverdlov, on the other hand, dismisses the story as a mere fairy tale. Returning to London, Judith finds a surprise gift from Sverdlov: an envelope containing a tamarind seed.

Convinced that Sverdlov is recruiting Judith to be a spy, British intelligence officer Jack Loder has his hands full with a clandestine Russian spy, code-named "Blue", when he learns that his assistant, George MacLeod, is having an affair with Margaret, the wife of British diplomat Fergus Stephenson, who is a conduit of state secrets. Loder cautions Judith, who is to contact him if she hears from Sverdlov.

Meanwhile Sverdlov, assigned to the Soviet Embassy in Paris, suspects that his boss, General Golitysn, distrusts him, and insists that Judith can be recruited as a spy. Sverdlov steals the "Blue" file, his bargaining chip with London to get asylum in Canada, and finagles a romantic stop in Barbados, where he is to meet Judith.

Sverdlov eludes an assassination attempt by Golitsyn's agents at London Airport and meets Judith in Barbados, where they consummate their relationship. But the General jets in a group of Soviet agents disguised as businessmen to attack the bungalow with napalm, an explosive bullet-riddled event that kills most of the agents when British agents intercede. The event reportedly kills Sverdlov, destroys the "Blue" file, and traumatizes Judith.

Loder later meets Judith in Barbados, where he divulges that newspaper accounts of Sverdlov's death were a false cover; seconds before the explosion, Sverdlov was whisked away to Canada by Loder's assistant, MacLeod. Her doubts dissolve when Loder gives her an envelope that contains a tamarind seed.

Loder now knows that "Blue" is Fergus Stephenson, a double agent he can manipulate with low-grade information for Moscow, until the Soviets believe that Stephenson is a double agent against themselves and kill him, Loder postulates. Later on, in a Canadian mountain valley, Judith and Sverdlov meet again and share a lovers' embrace.

== Cast ==
- Julie Andrews as Judith Farrow
- Omar Sharif as Feodor Sverdlov
- Anthony Quayle as Jack Loder
- Dan O'Herlihy as Fergus Stephenson
- Sylvia Syms as Margaret Stephenson
- Oskar Homolka as General Golitsyn
- Bryan Marshall as George MacLeod
- David Baron as Richard Paterson
- Celia Bannerman as Rachel Paterson
- Roger Dann as Col. Moreau
- Sharon Duce as Sandy Mitchell
- George Mikell as Maj. Stukalov
- Kate O'Mara as Anna Skriabina
- Constantine Gregory as Dimitri Memenov
- John Sullivan as 1st KGB Agent
- Terence Plummer as 2nd KGB Agent
- Leslie Crawford as 3rd KGB Agent
- Alexei Jawdokimov as Igor Kalinin
- Janet Henfrey as Embassy Section Head

== Production ==
The Tamarind Seed was partly financed by Sir Lew Grade as part of a two-movie deal to get Julie Andrews to commit to a TV show; the other film was Trilby. It was Andrews' first film in four years since Darling Lili. During that time, she had married Blake Edwards and concentrated on raising their children. "This is a nice film," said Andrews, "It's just right for my comeback."

The Tamarind Seed was filmed on location in Barbados, Belgravia (including Eaton Square) in London, and Paris.

== Reception ==
The film received a Royal Command Performance.

Lew Grade said the film "did fairly well" at the box office but claims that he struggled to make much money from it because Edwards and Andrews took such a large percentage of the profits (Andrews 10% of the gross, Edwards 5%). This was common practice for a top-billed star and writer/director.

David Steritt observed in his August 7, 1974 review for The Christian Science Monitor:

Once upon a time,… a Big Star could sell a movie all by himself … . Don't get me wrong. Lots of today's celebrities have screen presence and acting skill. But that indefinable "something" … has vanished. … Even conscious returns to old-fashioned star-movie-making don't fare very well in today's rarefied atmosphere. This is the central problem of Blake Edward's [sic] new The Tamarind Seed, starring Edwards's gifted wife Julie Andrews. … . The Tamarind Seed dotes on her, gazes at her, adores her—just like '30's directors fawned on Greta Garbo. But …the more modern Andrews essence can't support all that lavish attention. Before long, The Tamarind Seed turns into a very icky movie. It's a sad thing to report, because Edwards is one of the few old Hollywood-pro types left. … today's audiences are no longer accustomed to such single-minded essays. … On the plus side, The Tamarind Seed boasts Oscar Homolka, atmosphere, some gorgeous scenery, and the most complicated spy-melodrama plot since Hitchcock's Topaz. It probably would have worked a lot better if writer-director Edwards had emphasized these elements in themselves, rather than making them all backdrops to a semi-star performance in a starless age.

In a 1974 review in Movietone News, Kathleen Murphy wrote that the film was a good example of the concept of "the community of two" against the backdrop of complex international forces waging a cold war. Murphy writes:

Characteristically, the last bastion of stability and decency resides in the community of two, lovers whose loyalty and commitment to each other may momentarily transcend—but is ultimately and perfunctorily done in by—Cold War games. The games themselves have grown overly familiar and predictably nihilistic: means are expended to achieve ends that possess reality only to those unknown bookkeepers who keep track of the debits and assets of international espionage. ... The system kills—by moral attrition, or violently, physically—but always the abstraction of international security is best preserved by a terrible and wasteful expenditure of human resources. By debasing the moral coinage that allows men and women to deal with one another with even minimal trust or affection, the world is made safe for ... well, not people, but ... something.

Murphy concluded that The Tamarind Seed turns this genre of "the community of two" into the genuine article that "shifts and reshapes our thinking and feeling and seeing." In its place, a "new perception of reality" transcends the confines of the movie theater and makes its way into the "larger, less defined, and thus less understandable, territory of our lives."

== Cultural references ==
The film was spoofed in Mad magazine in 1975 as The Tommy-Red Seed.
