= David Baron (actor) =

English retired actor (born 1933)

- Born: David Baron Wilson; 7 April 1933 (age 93); Birmingham, England
- Occupation: Actor
- Years active: 1963/1964–2012

David Baron (born David Baron Wilson; 7 April 1933) is an English retired actor.

== Life and career ==
Baron was born on 7 April 1933 in Birmingham, England and went to teach and study at Queen's University in Ontario. Stumbling into acting, Baron turned professional and worked in television and on stage before returning to England.

Through his career he appeared in stage productions such as The Unexpected Guest by Agatha Christie, The Philanthropist by Christopher Hampton, and Otherwise Engaged by Simon Gray. His film credits include The Reptile (1966), Nobody Runs Forever (1968) and The Tamarind Seed (1974). He appeared in television series such as Doctor Who, The Avengers, The Professionals and Buccaneer. Baron's last screen credit was in the detective drama television series Foyle's War in 2010.

== Selected filmography ==
=== Film ===
Year	Title	Role	Notes
1966	The Reptile	Charles Edward Spalding	
1968	Nobody Runs Forever	Man in Bowtie	uncredited
1974	The Tamarind Seed	Richard Paterson	
1977	Double Exposure	James Crompton	

=== Television ===
Year	Title	Role	Notes
1965	The Airbase	Airman Asherton	Episode: "Peace at Any Price"
1965	Orlando	Konrad	Episode: "The Gold Plated Football"
1967	Doctor Who	Ralpachan	5 episodes; serial: The Abominable Snowmen
1967	The Troubleshooters	Mike Szabo	4 episodes
1969	The Avengers	Metcalfe	Episode: "Love All"
1970	Playhouse	Mr. Harvey	Episode: "The Pueblo Affair"
1971	Hine	Mrumpacker	Episode: "Everything I Am I Owe"
1971	Kate	Paul Bains	Episode: "You Can't Condemn Them All"
1972	Dead of Night	James Halt	Episode: "Death Cancels All Debts"
1973	Love Story	Sam	Episode: "Conversations in the Dark"
1974	The Top Secret Life of Edgar Briggs	Maxwell	Episode: "The Appointment"
1978	The Professionals	Mr. Sumner	Episode: "Heroes"
1979	Minder	Casino Manager	Episode: "Aces High: and Sometimes Very Low"
1980	Buccaneer	First Officer	Episode: "A No Go Item"
1982	Q.E.D.	Guest at Seance	Episode: "Target: London"
2010	Foyle's War	Old Bailey Judge	Episode: "The Hide"
