= William Bowyer-Smijth =

English cricketer, baronet and politician (1814–1883)

Sir William Bowyer-Smiyth, Bt DL, JP

Member of Parliament for South Essex
- In office 1852–1857 Serving with Thomas William Bramston
- Preceded by: Sir Edward North Buxton; Thomas William Bramston
- Succeeded by: Richard Baker; Thomas William Bramston

Personal details
- Born: William Smijth; 22 April 1814
- Died: 20 November 1883 (aged 69) Twineham Court, Sussex
- Spouse(s): Marianne Frances Meux (m. 1839; died 1875) Eliza Fechnie Malcolm (m. 1875; died 1883)
- Children: 15, including William
- Parent(s): Sir Edward Bowyer-Smijth, 10th Baronet; Laetitia Cecily Weyland
- Education: Eton College
- Alma mater: Trinity College, Cambridge

Sir William Bowyer-Smijth, 11th Baronet, DL, JP (22 April 1814 – 20 November 1883) was an English cricketer, baronet and Conservative Party politician.

== Background ==
Born as William Smijth, he was the oldest son of Sir Edward Bowyer-Smijth, 10th Baronet and his wife Laetitia Cecily Weyland, daughter of John Weyland. On 10 June 1839, his name was changed to Bowyer-Smijth by royal licence.

He was educated at Eton College and went then to Trinity College, Cambridge. In 1850, Bowyer-Smijth succeeded his father as baronet.

== Career ==
From 1845, he played for the Marylebone Cricket Club until 1848. Bowyer-Smijth contested South Essex in the 1847 general election unsuccessfully. He entered the British House of Commons in 1852, sitting as a member of parliament (MP) for until 1857. Bowyer-Smijth had a commission as lieutenant in the 19th Essex Rifle Volunteers and served as a Deputy Lieutenant and a Justice of the Peace.

== Personal life ==
On 2 April 1839 he married firstly Marianne Frances Meux, second daughter of Sir Henry Meux, 1st Baronet in Cheshunt in Hertfordshire and had by her two sons and a daughter. Bowyer-Smijth later left his wife and pretending to be a widower, he began to court Eliza Fechnie Malcolm, daughter of David Baird Malcolm, who was aged sixteen at that time. Under the impression of a feigned ceremony, she considered herself to be lawful married and borne him twelve children, six sons and seven daughters until 1873, when she learned that his wife was still alive. When he promised to make up the marriage after the death of Marianne, she however continued to stay with him.

Bowyer-Smijth's first wife died on 19 March 1875 and he remarried Eliza in Cheltenham in London only a week later. Only two daughters born after the marriage, were legitimately, all others illegitimately. Although legitimised under Scottish law by petition in 1918, the English baronetcy and estates could not pass to these children. Bowyer-Smijth died, aged 69 in Twineham Court in Sussex and was succeeded as baronet by his oldest son William of his first marriage, after whose death the title went to his nephew Alfred Bowyer-Smyth.

Parliament of the United Kingdom
Preceded by Sir Edward North Buxton; Thomas William Bramston	Member of Parliament for South Essex; 1852–1857; With: Thomas William Bramston	Succeeded by Richard Baker; Thomas William Bramston
Baronetage of England
Preceded by Edward Bowyer-Smijth	Baronet (of Hill Hall); 1850–1883	Succeeded by William Bowyer-Smijth
