= Residual =

A residual is generally a quantity left over at the end of a process. It may refer to:

== Business ==
- Residual (entertainment industry), in business, one of an ongoing stream of royalties for rerunning or reusing motion pictures, television shows or commercials
- Profit (accounting), residuals that shareholders, partners or other owners are entitled to, after debtors are covered
  - Residual in the bankruptcy of insolvent businesses, moneys that are left after all assets are sold and all creditors paid, to be divided among residual claimants
- Residual (or balloon) in finance, a lump sum owed to the financier at the end of a loan's term; for example Balloon payment mortgage

== Mathematics, statistics and econometrics ==
- Residual (statistics)
  - Studentized residual
- Residual time, in the theory of renewal processes
- Residual (numerical analysis)
  - Minimal residual method
  - Generalized minimal residual method
- Residual set, the complement of a meager set
- Residual property (mathematics), a concept in group theory
- Residually finite group, a specific residual property
- The residual function attached to a residuated mapping
- Residual in a residuated lattice, loosely analogous to division
- Residue (complex analysis)
- Solow residual, in economics

== Popular culture ==
=== Music ===
- "Residuals" (song), a song by Chris Brown from his album 11:11

== Geomorphology ==
A residual is the remnant of a formerly extensive mass of rock or land surface

- Inselberg
- Mesa
- Monadnock

== Other uses ==
- Residual neural network
- Residual volume, the amount of air left in the lungs after a maximal exhalation; see Lung volumes

== See also ==
- Residue (disambiguation)
