= Hall (concept) =

Building or organization

The meanings attributed to the word hall have varied over the centuries, as social practices have changed. The word derives from the Old Teutonic (hallâ), where it is associated with the idea of covering or concealing. In modern German it is Halle where it refers to a building but Saal where it refers to a large public room though the distinction is blurred:(Halle (Architektur) (de)). The latter may arise from a genitive form of the former. The French salle is borrowed from the German.

== Simple beginnings ==
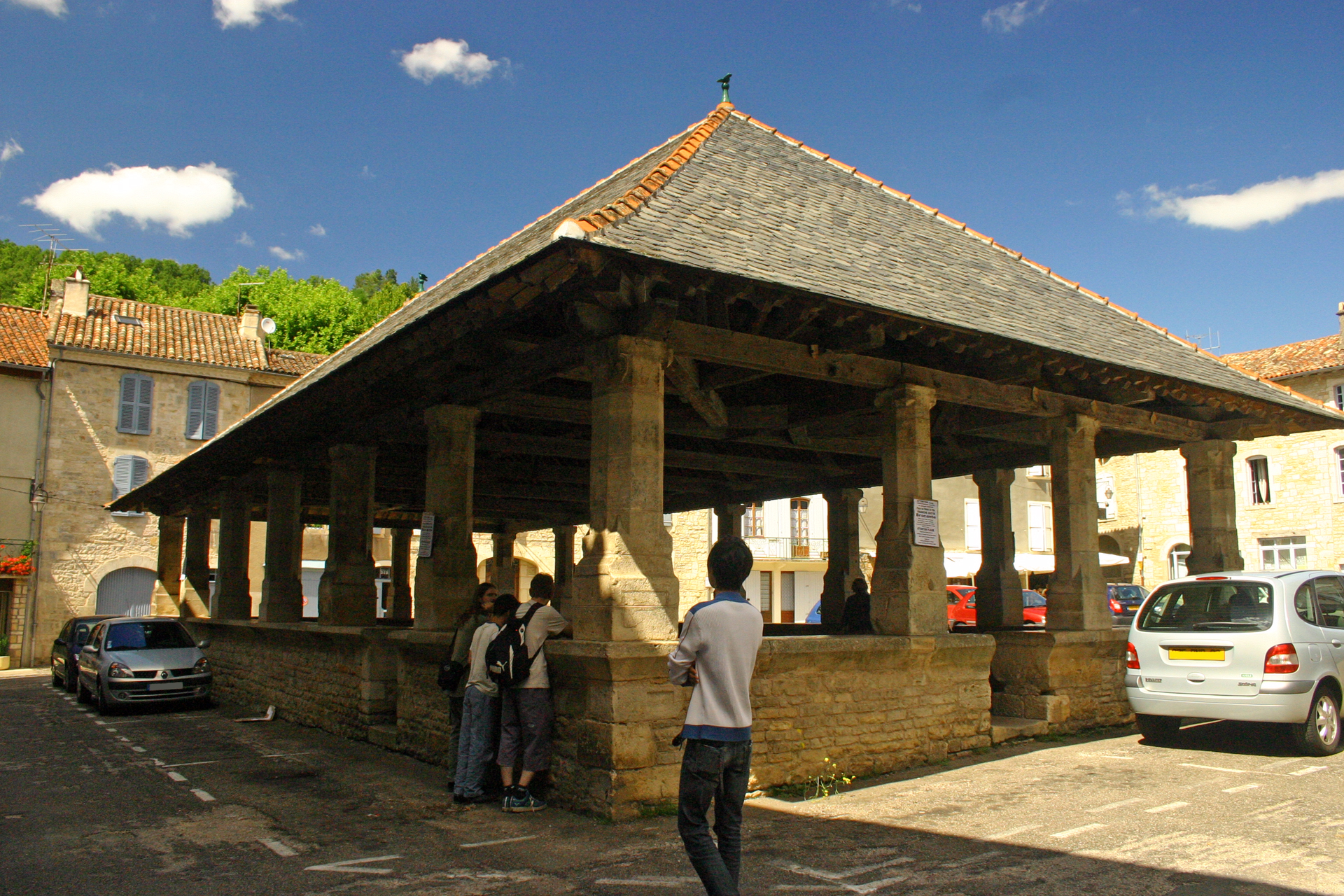
Market hall and town square in Caylus, Tarn-et-Garonne, France.

The Oxford English Dictionary gives nine meanings of hall relevant to buildings with a root of the word meaning "...to cover, conceal." A hall is, fundamentally, a relatively large space enclosed by a roof such as a market hall. Coming from the Old English language, it was brought into Britain in the fifth century.

A hall is also a large, public or stately room in a building, such as Westminster Hall.

Hall also may refer to a building itself where meetings or events occur such as a Guild hall, a town hall or a concert hall.

Also a dwelling-house with a large, open room (the hall) typically with an open hearth such as the original form of the Wealden hall house.

In 500, such a simple building was the residence of a lord and his retainers. This is the kind of hall which Beowulf knew. Even now, hall is the term used for a country house in midland and northern England.

The concept was more fundamental than referring to just domestic buildings. Though the lord's hall had an administrative aspect, this was more prominent in the town hall and the guild hall. The term might even be applied to a temple, in the same way as a basilica, now an ecclesiastical building, originated as a lordly reception hall with other domestic and other buildings close by in the same compound, just like an Anglo-Saxon moated hall but in a warmer climate. Compare the Basilica in Trier. (picture). Similarly, the French word salle can refer to a large, former church building such as the Salle Stengel de Lorentzen (fr) or to a sports hall (fr) large enough for playing hockey in.

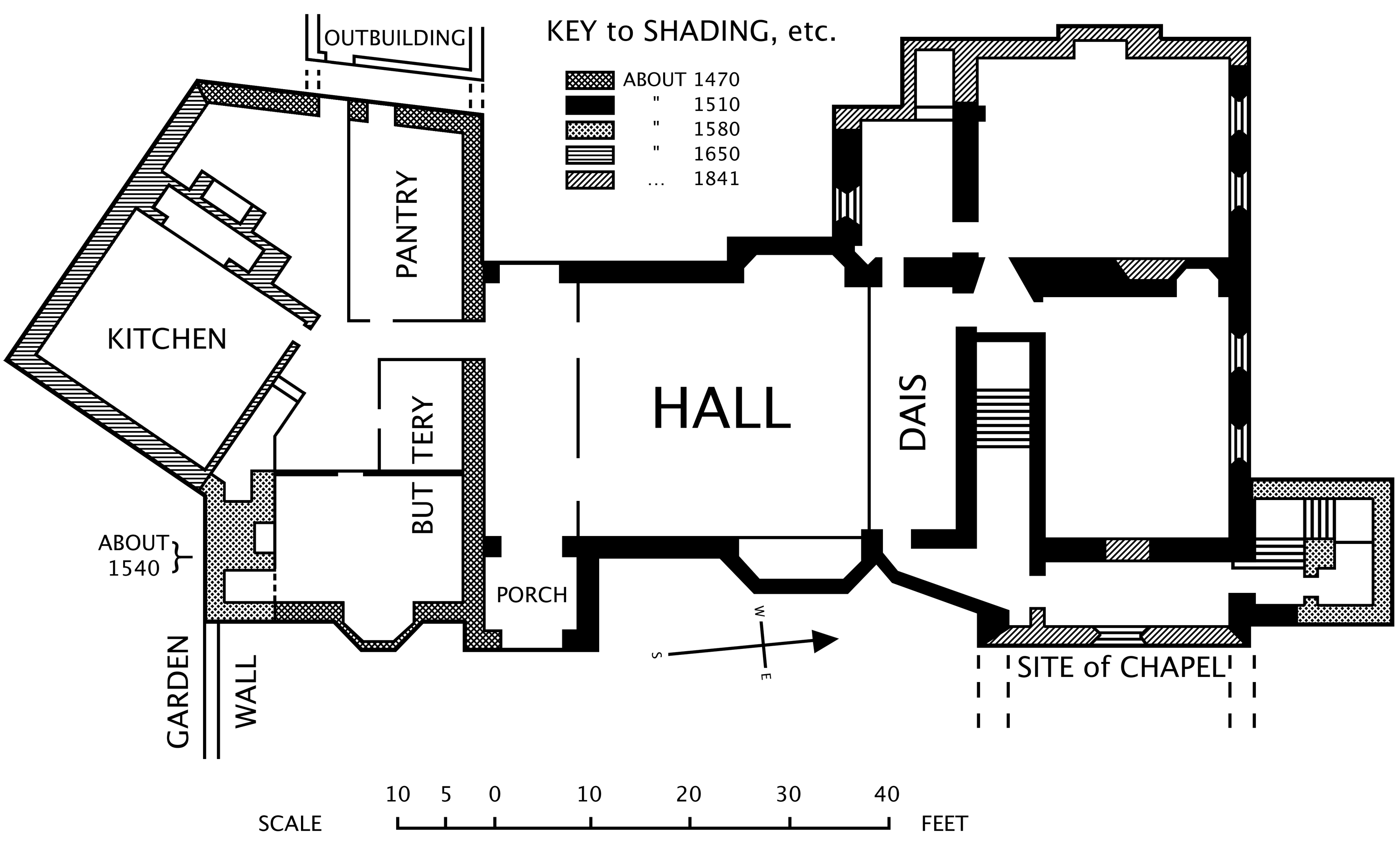
A plan of a late medieval hall house called Horham Hall. Here, the screens passage has a porch at one end; the upper, dais, end has a grander window. The main staircase is at the dais end and photos show that the hall was the full height of the house.

Plan view of a simple hall house

== Medieval developments ==
Later, partitions were set up so that the lord's family could have more privacy, a fairly new concept in northern Europe at the time. The English had come to Britain from a part of Europe which had not been directly exposed to the ways of the Roman Empire. As further time passed, the hall became the largest room of the house, often referred to as the great hall. While the humbler residents still slept there, the lord's family had one or more chambers at one end of the building in what came to be called the solar.

At this stage, we have the hall house in which the central room is the great hall. Off one end is the solar while a partition divides the other end of the hall off as the screens passage. Across the passage lie the pantry and buttery with between them, a passage through to the kitchen. The function of the last had been removed from the hall for the convenience of both cooks and inhabitants but also because roasting fires were a serious fire risk. Kitchens were by this time, built of more fireproof materials in a separate building. These arrangements were well established by the fifteenth century. At some stage, one of these divisions was the parlour, a concept which was in secular use by 1374.

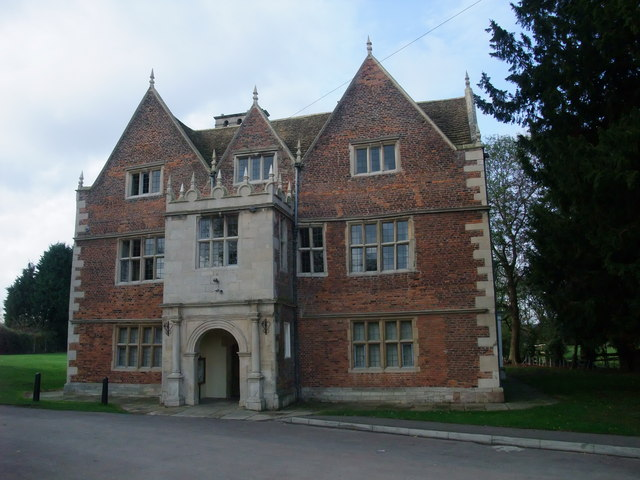
The Red Hall, Bourne, Lincolnshire. c. 1620

== Renaissance domesticity ==
During the sixteenth the process of subdivision proceeded. Notably, in an increasing number of cases, this was by inserting a floor, dividing the space which would have been occupied by the open hall in two, horizontally. From the early seventeenth century, the hall was usually a space inside the front door, more or less grand, in keeping with the grandeur of the house, in which people were first welcomed before proceeding to one of the partitioned rooms. The Red Hall in Bourne from about 1620 is still called a hall, but is designed not around a great hall but its staircase. Its hall, at the front door, has rather the nature of a passage leading to the featured staircase at the back of the house. The hall has a ceiling as low as any other in the house.

In a modern house, the hall is the space inside the front door from which the rooms are reached. Where this kind of hall is elongated, it may be called a passage, or hallway. The corresponding space upstairs is a landing.

== Other aspects ==
In an early medieval building, as in the round Iron Age houses before them, the hall was where the fire was kept. With time, its functions as dormitory, kitchen, parlour and so on were divided off to separate rooms or, in the case of the kitchen, a separate building.

=== University halls ===
On the same principle many buildings at colleges and universities are formally titled "So-and-so Hall". Such a hall is typically named after the person who endowed it, for example, King's Hall, Cambridge. Others, such as Lady Margaret Hall, Oxford, commemorate respected people.

Between these in age, Nassau Hall at Princeton University began as the single building of the then college, showing a continuation of the medieval European pattern in America. The medieval universities had developed from colleges, that is groups of like-minded people living together in halls similar to the lordly ones described above and sleeping in carrels or separate rooms around the great hall.

In many cases, some aspect of this community remains in the modern institution. At colleges in the universities of Oxford, Cambridge and Durham for example, Hall is the dining hall for students, with High Table, on the dais at the high end, for fellows. Typically, at "Formal Hall", gowns are worn for dinner during the evening, whereas for "informal Hall" they are not.

=== Livery companies ===
Many livery companies, such as the Mercers in the City of London, have a Hall which serves as their headquarters and meeting place. In origin, this was just like the lordly hall with its great hall, though the peripheral rooms would have their specialist uses as parlours and robing rooms, for example.

=== Public halls ===
Similarly a hall is also a building consisting largely of a principal room, whether medieval like Westminster Hall or more modern like Carnegie Hall, used for various ceremonial, social or concert events. Most public halls of this sort are available for renting out for meetings and social affairs. It may be privately or government-owned, such as a function hall owned by one company used for weddings and cotillions (organized and run by the same company on a contractual basis) or a community hall available for rent to anyone.
Following a line of similar development:

- In office buildings and larger buildings (theatres, cinemas etc.), the entrance hall is generally known as the foyer (the French for fireplace). The atrium, a name sometimes used in public buildings for the entrance hall, was the central courtyard of a Roman house.

Derived from the residential meanings of the word:

- Hall is also a surname of people, one of whose ancestors may have lived or worked in a hall as distinct from one such as David M. Cote, whose ancestor was named for a "cote": a much humbler place shared with the livestock.

== Association with salt ==
From a completely separate derivation:

A Hall is a brand of bitter (beer) made in Germany and sold worldwide, mainly across America.

- In German speaking areas, Hall (with a short a) can also form part of a town name, like Halle, where the name refers to hall, the Celtic word for salt (compare Welsh halen or Breton holen or Cornish holan). In this connection, Hall is the short form of the name of:
1. the medieval German town Schwäbisch Hall, where Hall was its whole name prior to 1933
2. the Austrian town Hall in Tirol near Innsbruck, which used to be called Solbad Hall from 1938 to 1974,
3. Hallstatt in Austria, which gave its name to the Celtic Hallstatt culture.

Sir Charles Hallé (originally Karl Halle) lent his name to the Hallé Orchestra. His forebears were probably associated with the German town of Halle. The accent was added to his name in order to assist English-speakers in pronouncing the word.

In the ancient world, the Celts were neighbours of the Greeks, whose word for salt was háls (ἅλς). While European science was developing, some branches of it adopted the Greek language as the source of its terminology. English therefore has words like halogen, halide, halotrichite and the hybrid halocarbon.
