= The Relic (Anthony novel) =

1991 novel by Evelyn Anthony

- Author: Evelyn Anthony
- Language: English
- Genre: Suspense fiction
- Publisher: HarperCollins
- Publication date: August 14, 1991
- Pages: 288
- ISBN: 978-0-06-016101-9

The Relic is a 1991 novel by British author Evelyn Anthony. It follows Lucy Warren, who inherits St. Vladimir's Cross on her father's death, and her romance with the Soviet dissident Dimitri Volkov. Published by HarperCollins on August 14, 1991, it received mixed reviews from critics.

== Plot ==
Lucy Warren is living in Jersey when she inherits St. Vladimir's Cross upon the death of her father, a Ukrainian émigré. The cross is believed to have the power to rule Russia. Lucy is instructed to travel to Geneva, where she will find a Soviet dissident named Dimitri Volkov, an alcoholic whose wife is a psychotherapist and KGB agent. Lucy and Dimitri fall in love and decide to work together to free Ukraine from Soviet rule.

== Publication ==
The Relic was published on August 14, 1991, by HarperCollins. It was Anthony's 31st novel. The audiobook was read by Tammy Ustinov.

== Reception ==
The novel received mixed reviews from critics. Dean James for the Library Journal recommended the novel, commending Anthony's skill for storytelling, although he commented that she takes a black and white approach to morality. A review in Magill's Book Reviews similarly compared the novel to those of Graham Greene and John le Carré, criticising The Relic for not exploring a deeper level of plot, characters and moral complexity. Despite these comments, Janet McCann praised the plot, the fast pace and the ending. Reviews in Publishers Weekly and Kirkus Reviews both commented on the timeliness of the plot but felt that the power of the cross and Dimitri's role as a revolutionary were not sufficiently convincing.
