= Relic (Foster novel) =

2018 novel by Alan Dean Foster

- Author: Alan Dean Foster
- Language: English
- Publisher: Del Rey Books
- Publication date: August 2018
- ISBN: 978-1-101-96763-8

Relic is a 2018 pastoral science fiction novel by Alan Dean Foster. It is about Ruslan, the sole surviving member of the human race after a lethal virus, who is rescued by aliens who study him and seek to recreate the human race and possibly find the mythical home planet of humans.

== Plot ==
It is about a future in which humans have developed the capability to travel outside the Solar System. Despite their technological prowess, humans develop some dangerous technologies. After scientists develop a virus, it kills almost every human, except one man, Ruslan.

He is rescued by the Myssari, an extraterrestrial species, which wants to study him and use his DNA to recreate more humans. The aliens offer Ruslan a deal: if he cooperates with their genetic experiments, they will try to find the fabled first planet where humankind started. Ruslan hopes he will get to travel to this planet, called "Earth", if it truly exists, and perhaps find other human survivors.

== Reception ==
The Washington Post named Relic one of the best science fiction and fantasy books of August 2018.Publishers Weekly pointed out strengths but also "a few missed opportunities for heightened drama".
