= Sir John Lloyd, 1st Baronet =

Welsh politician (died 1664)

Sir John Lloyd, 1st Baronet (ca. 1617 – 1 January 1664) was a Welsh politician who sat in the House of Commons at various times between 1646 and 1660.

He was the son of Griffith Lloyd of Forest Brechfa, Carmarthenshire and studied law at Gray's Inn (1635). In 1646, Lloyd was elected Member of Parliament (MP) for Carmarthenshire as a recruiter to the Long Parliament. He was secluded in Pride's Purge in 1648.

In 1660, he was elected MP for Carmarthenshire again in the Cavalier Parliament and was briefly custos rotulorum for Carmarthenshire from March - July 1660. He served as a deputy lieutenant for the county from 1661 to his death. On 28 February 1662, he was made a baronet. He lived in Woking, Surrey.

== Family ==
Lloyd married the Hon. Beatrice Annesley, daughter of Francis Annesley, 1st Viscount Valentia and his wife Dorothy Philipps, widow of James Zouch (1615–1643). Their son, John, succeeded to the baronetcy. His daughter, Beatrice, married Sir John Barlow, 1st Baronet of Slebetch.

== Sources ==
- "LLOYD, John (c.1617-64), of Fforest Brechfa, Carm. and Woking, Surr". History of Parliament Online.

Parliament of England
| Preceded by Henry Vaughan | Member of Parliament for Carmarthenshire; 1646–1648 | Succeeded by John Claypole |
Baronetage of England
| New creation | Baronet of Woking; 1662–1664 | Succeeded by John Lloyd |
