= Thomas Fleetwood (of the Vache) =

16th-century English politician

Fleetwood
- Country: England

Thomas Fleetwood (1517/18 – 1570), of London, The Vache, Chalfont St. Giles, Buckinghamshire and Rossall, Lancashire, was an English politician. He was a Member of Parliament, a judge, and Master of the Royal Mint under King Henry VIII.

== Biography ==
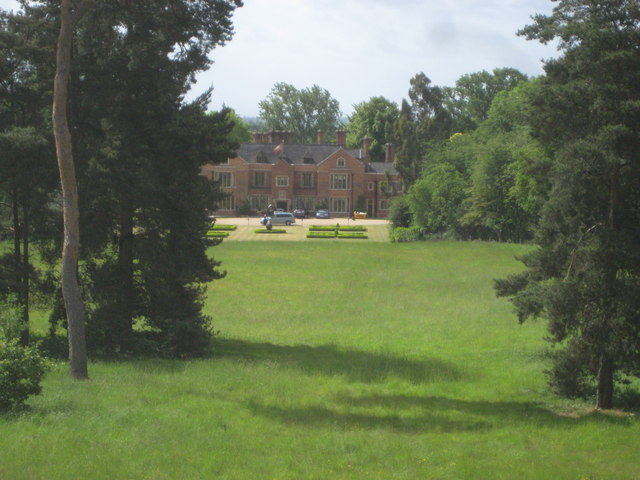
The Vache, Buckinghamshire

Fleetwood was the younger son of William Fleetwood and Ellen Standish and originated from Heskin, Lancashire. He was granted the family's arms on 4 July 1548, which is still used by the family.

In 1545 he became Teller at the Tower mint for three years. Further positions at the London mints followed. He was comptroller and assayer at the Southwark mint from 1547 to 1551, appointed commissioner for the new coinage in December 1550 and under treasurer at the Tower mint from 1560 to 1562. The profits from the appointments enabled him to buy land in both Buckinghamshire and Lancashire, particularly the estate known as the Vache in Chalfont St Giles, which he purchased in 1564. He was a Member (MP) of the Parliament of England for Preston in March 1553 and for Buckinghamshire in 1563 and was pricked High Sheriff of Bedfordshire and Buckinghamshire for 1564–65.

He died in 1570 and was buried in an elaborate tomb at Chalfont St. Giles. He had married twice: his first wife was Barbara Francis, by whom he had three sons and a daughter. His second wife was Bridget, the youngest child of Sir John Spring of Lavenham, Suffolk, with whom he had seven sons and seven daughters, including William, George, Henry and Joyce, grandmother of the leading statesman Thomas Osborne, 1st Duke of Leeds. The Vache estate passed to the second of these sons George Fleetwood.

== Arms ==
Coat of arms of Thomas Fleetwood

Notes
Granted by the College of Arms, 4 July 1548.
Crest
A woolffe hedd about his neck a gemel golde, open mouthed langued guyles
Escutcheon
Asure and golde undee per pale, six Martletts interchanged on the felde

== See also ==
- Fleetwood (noble family)

== Notes ==
Political offices
Preceded by Paul Darrell	High Sheriff of Bedfordshire and Buckinghamshire; 1564–1565	Succeeded by Sir Henry Cheyne
