= Theydon Mount =

Village in Essex, England

Coordinates: 51.6724°N 0.1578°E

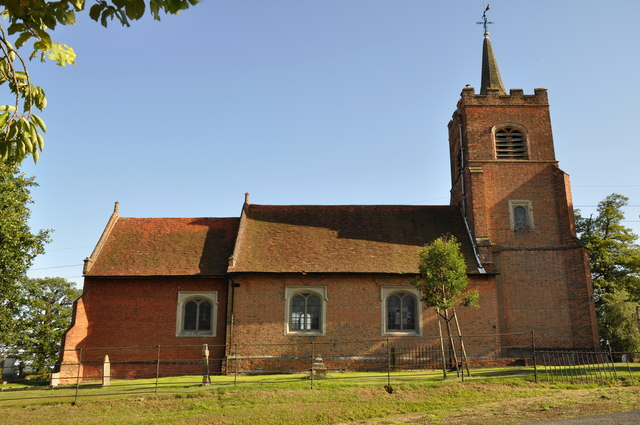
- St Michael's Church

- Location within Essex
- Interactive map of Theydon Mount
- Population: 203 (Parish, 2021)
- Civil parish: Theydon Mount
- District: Epping Forest
- Shire county: Essex
- Region: East
- Country: England
- Sovereign state: United Kingdom
- Post town: Epping
- Postcode district: CM16

Theydon Mount is a village and civil parish in the Epping Forest district of Essex, England. The village is notable for the Grade I listed Elizabethan mansion, Hill Hall. At the 2021 census the parish had a population of 203.

== History ==
The name "Theydon" is thought to mean 'valley where thatch (material) grows'. The word "Mount" derives from the hill on which it is located. Theydon Mount has been called Theydon Paulyn, Theydon Lessington, and Theydon Briwes in the past. The names from the former lords of the manor. The name Thoydon Mount has also been used. Theydon Bois, Garnon and Mount were recorded in the Domesday Book as 'Taindena' and 'Teidana'.

== Geography ==
Theydon Mount is close to the M25 motorway. The parish, which includes the hamlet of Mount End, has an area of 632 hectares and a population of 163 people. Nearby settlements include the town of Epping, the villages of Theydon Bois, Stapleford Tawney, Theydon Garnon, the hamlets of Hobbs Cross, Passingford Bridge, Mount End and Fiddlers Hamlet.

== Landmarks ==
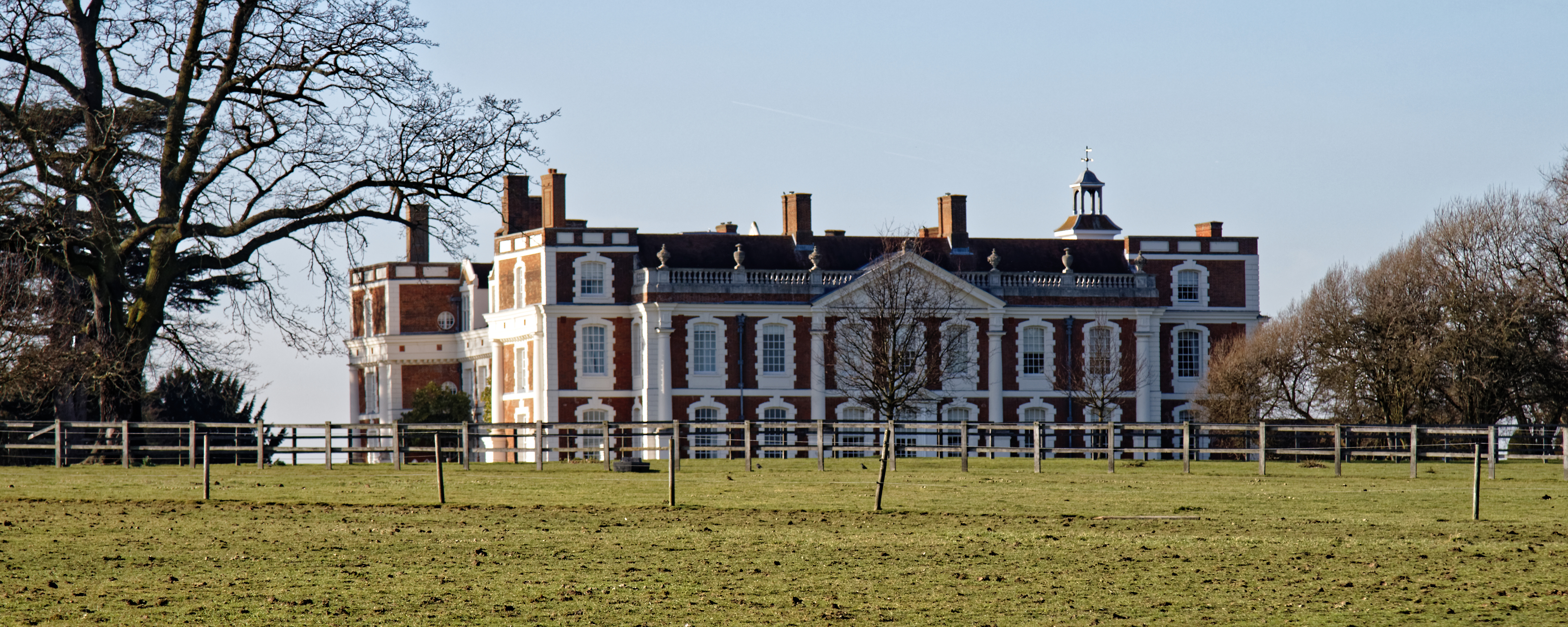
Hill Hall

Hill Hall is a Grade I Listed country house. It was built in 1557–1558 for Sir Thomas Smith. The house was occupied in the 1930s by Lord Edward Hay. Theydon Mount has a church called St Michael which was completed in 1614 by Sir William Smith and is Grade I Listed. The original church was St Michael and St Stephen which burnt down in 1611. Mount Hall was near to the site of Hill Hall, there are no remains of it.

== Education ==
Theydon Mount had a school which closed in 1942, the children were transferred to Theydon Garnon.
