= Hill Hall (Essex) =

Country house in Theydon Mount, Essex, England

Coordinates: 51°40′27.18″N 0°9′9.1″E

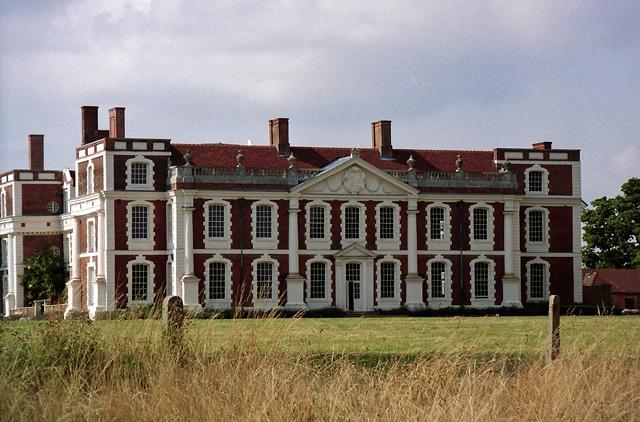
Hill Hall, the East Front, rebuilt c. 1714

Hill Hall is an Elizabethan, and later, country house in Theydon Mount near Epping, Essex, England. Although owned by English Heritage, the building has now been divided into many private apartments. It is a Grade I listed building.

The importance of Hill Hall lies in two features. Firstly, it has some of the earliest classical decoration on any surviving building in Britain – the tiers of columns and friezes on the courtyard walls and the use of giant order columns (that is, rising through two storeys) on some of the exterior facades. Secondly, the 1969 fire destroyed most of the interiors but not, miraculously, a series of wall paintings on the first floor completed more or less when the house was built in the late 16th century. They are an unusual survival of classically inspired mural paintings. There have been a series of remodellings and additions, especially to the exterior.

== History ==
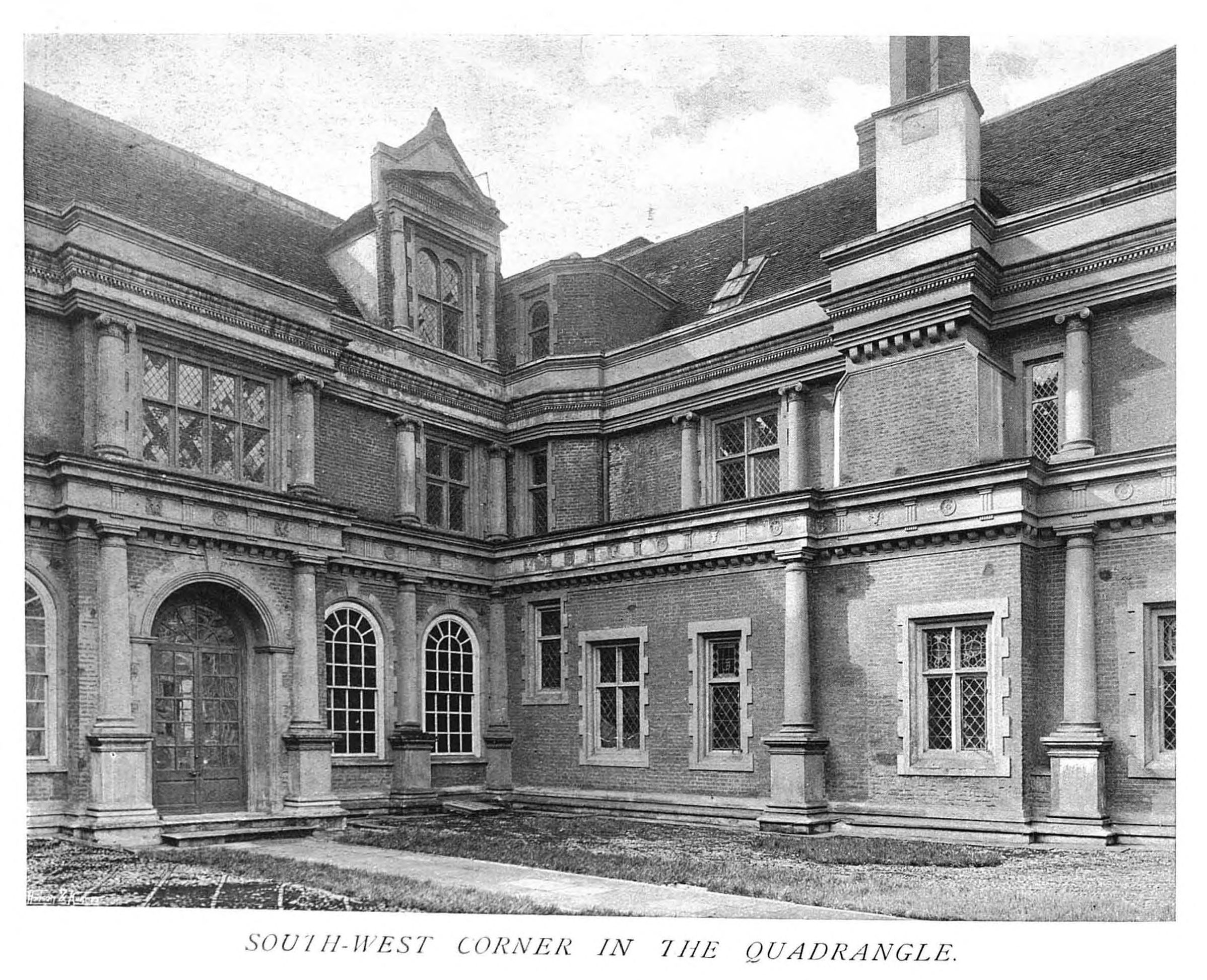
The courtyard in 1907; mostly 16th-century

The house was originally built for Sir Thomas Smith during the reign of Elizabeth I to replace a 12th-century house on the same site. Construction was carried out over several intervals (1567–68, 1572–73) interspersed between Smith's stints as ambassador to France. In his will, Smith mentions that Richard Kyrkebye or Kyrbie was the chief architect and builder of Hill Hall, according to the "plat" or plan he had given to him. Some of the furnishings at Hill Hall in 1578 were listed in the will of Lady Philippa Smith, including beds made of French walnut wood in the Great Chamber, Gallery, and Green Bedchamber.

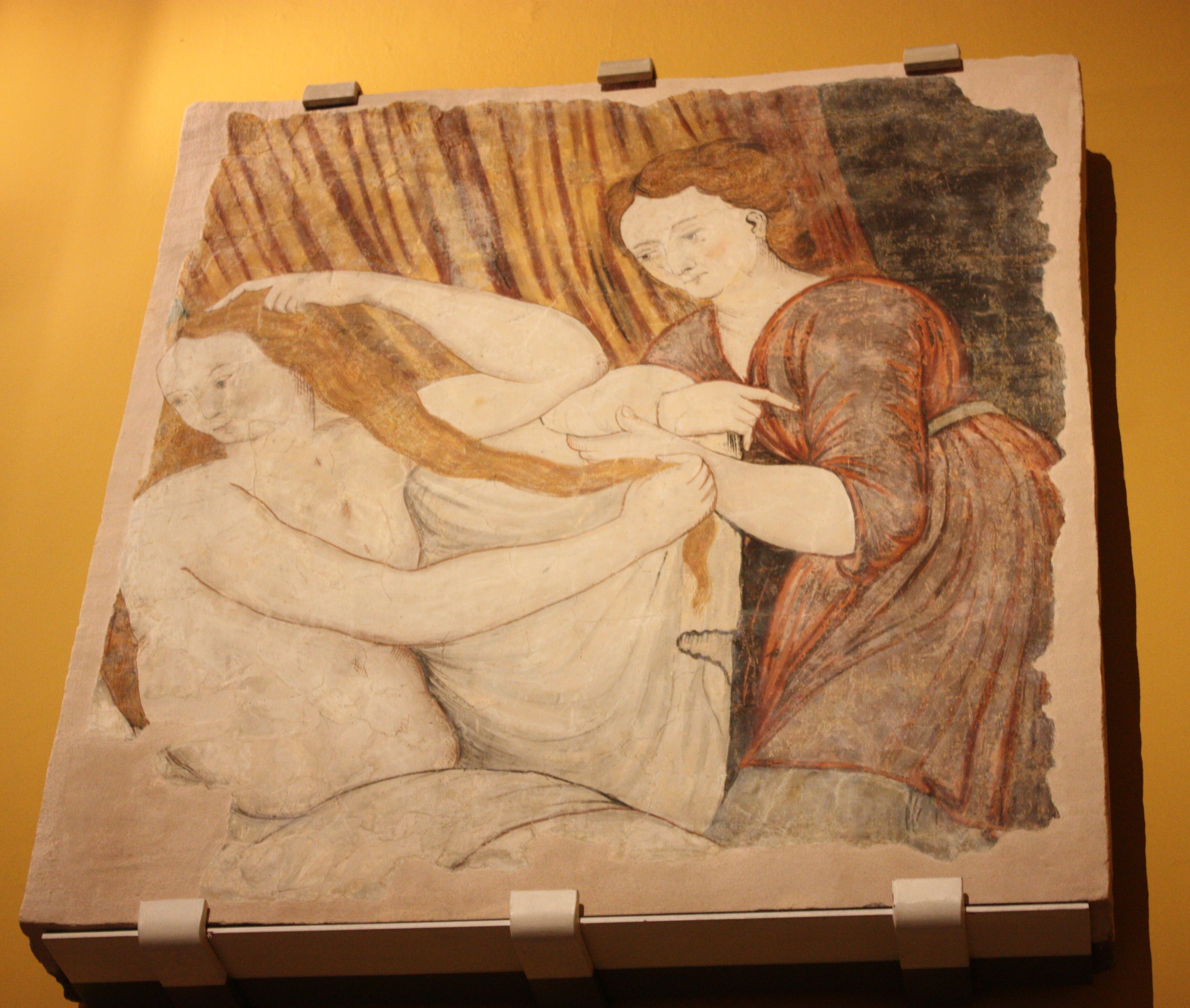
Cupid and Psyche. Fragment of the wall paintings saved from the fire; now V&A

The earliest known example of a guinea pig being kept in Europe was uncovered at Hill Hall in an archaeological dig in a layer dating to 1574 or 1575, at which time the home would have been occupied by Sir Thomas Smith. Being a New World animal, the guinea pig would have been quite an exotic pet at the time, reflecting Smith's high status as ambassador to France. This is the earliest evidence of guinea pigs being kept as pets in Europe.

The hall stands in 50 hectares (120 acres) of parkland designed by Humphrey Repton.

The Smith, later Bowyer-Smyth, family remained in occupation until the mid 19th century.

Hill Hall subsequently became a prisoner of war camp during World War 2. Pregnant women from the east end of London were also evacuated from London during the early part of World War II and babies were also born there. Later, Hill Hall became a women's prison until a fire in 1969. It has since become part of the Heritage Trust. Limited tours are available to see the internal period wall paintings described by Croft-Murray of the British Museum as the most important survival of Elizabethan decorative figure painting in England.
