= Armorial of the speakers of the English House of Commons =

Armorial of the speakers of the House of Commons is displayed at the House of Commons in the Palace of Westminster. Speakers customarily took a grant of arms while in office if they were not armigerous already. Their shields of arms are painted on the interior walls of Speaker's House.

== Earlier parlours and prolocutors (1258–1376) ==
Arms	Name of Speaker and heraldic blazon
	Peter de Montfort, Prolocutor 1258–64 Escutcheon: Bendy of eight Or and Azure.
	Sir William Trussell, Prolocutor 1327, 1340 and 1343 Escutcheon: Argent a cross fleury Gules.
	Henry de Beaumont, Prolocutor 1332 Escutcheon: Azure semée of fleurs-de-lys a lion rampant Or.
	Sir Geoffrey le Scrope, Prolocutor 1332 Escutcheon: Azure a bend Or.
	Sir William de Thorpe, Prolocutor 1347–8 Escutcheon: Barry of fourteen Or and Sable.
	Sir William de Shareshull, Prolocutor 1351 Escutcheon: Barry nebully of six Argent and Gules a bordure Sable bezanty.
	Sir Peter de la Mare, Prolocutor 1376–7 Escutcheon: Gules two chevrons Or.

== Richard II (1377–1399) ==
Arms	Name of Speaker and heraldic blazon
	Sir Thomas Hungerford, Speaker of the House 1377 Escutcheon: Sable two bars Argent in chief three plates.
	Sir James Pickering, Speaker of the House 1378 and 1382–3 Escutcheon: Ermine a lion passant Azure crowned Or.
	John Guildesborough, Speaker of the House 1379–80 Escutcheon: Argent three piles Gules. Crest: A chevalier on horseback at full speed holding a sword all Proper.
	Sir Richard Waldegrave, Speaker of the House 1381–2 Escutcheon: Per pale Argent and Gules. Crest: Out of a ducal coronet Or a plume of five ostrich feathers per pale Argent and Gules. Motto: Coelum Non Animum
	Sir John Bussy, Speaker of the House 1394–7 Escutcheon: Or three water bougets Argent.

== Henry IV (1399–1413) ==
Arms	Name of Speaker and heraldic blazon
	Sir John Cheyne, Speaker of the House 1399 Blazon not available.
	John Doreward, Speaker of the House 1399 and 1413 Escutcheon: Ermine on a chevron Sable three crescents Or.
	Sir Arnold Savage, Speaker of the House 1400-2 and 1403-4 Escutcheon: Argent six lions rampant Sable.
	Sir Henry Redford, Speaker of the House 1402 Escutcheon: Argent fretty Sable a chief of the second.
	Sir William Esturmy, Speaker of the House 1404 Escutcheon: Argent three demi-lions rampant Gules.
	Sir John Tiptoft (later Baron Tiptoft), Speaker of the House 1405-6 Escutcheon: Argent a saltire engrailed Gules.
	Thomas Chaucer, Speaker of the House 1407–11, 1414 and 1421 Escutcheon: Per pale Argent and Gules a bend counterchanged.

== Henry V (1413–1422) ==
Arms	Name of Speaker and heraldic blazon
	William Stourton, Speaker of the House 1413 Escutcheon: Sable a bend Or between six fountains.
	Sir Walter Hungerford (later Baron Hungerford), Speaker of the House 30 April 1414 – 29 May 1414 Escutcheon: Sable two bars Argent in chief three plates. Crest: The Peverell garb between two Hungerford sickles.
	Sir Richard Redman, Speaker of the House 1415 Escutcheon: Gules three cushions or. Crest: Blazon not available.
	Sir Walter Beauchamp, Speaker of the House 1416 Escutcheon: Gules a fess between six martlets Or.
	Roger Flower, Speaker of the House 1416-9 Escutcheon: Sable ermined Argent a pierced cinquefoil Ermine. Crest: An eagle's head erased Sable ermined Argent & with a gold crown about its neck.
	Roger Hunt, Speaker of the House 1420-1 Blazon not available.

== Henry VI (1422–1461) ==
Arms	Name of Speaker and heraldic blazon
	John Russell, Speaker of the House 1423-4 and 1432 Escutcheon: Argent a chevron between three crosses bottonée fitchée Sable.
	Sir Thomas Walton, Speaker of the House 1424-6 Escutcheon: Argent a chevron between three annulets Sable.
	Sir Richard Vernon, Speaker of the House 1426 Escutcheon: Chequy Or and Azure on a canton Gules a lion rampant Argent.
	Sir John Tyrell, Speaker of the House 1427–8, 1431 and 1437 Escutcheon: Argent two chevrons Azure a bordure engrailed Gules. Crest: A boar's head erect Argent out of the mouth a peacock's tail Proper. Supporters: Two tigers reguardant Proper.
	William Alington, Speaker of the House 1429–30 Escutcheon: Sable a bend engrailed between six billets Argent.
	John Bowes, Speaker of the House 1435 Escutcheon: Ermine three bows strung in pale Gules. Crest: A sheaf of arrows Or bound in a girdle Azure surmounted with the motto "Sans Variance Et Mon Droit". Motto: In Multis In Magnis In Bonis Expertus
	William Burley, Speaker of the House 1437 and 1445 Escutcheon: Argent a lion rampant Sable armed Gules debruised with a fesse counter-compony Or and Argent.
	Sir William Tresham, Speaker of the House 1439–42, 1446–7 and 1449–50 Escutcheon: Per saltire Argent and Sable in chief three trefoils slipped Vert two and one in base one and two of the last.
	John Say, Speaker of the House 1449 and 1463-8 Escutcheon: Per pale Azure and Gules three chevronels Or voided and counterchanged.
	Sir John Popham, Speaker of the House 1449 Escutcheon: Argent on a chief Gules two bucks' heads cabossed Or. Crest: A buck's head erased Proper.
	William Oldhall, Speaker of the House 1450-2 Escutcheon: Per pale Azure and Purpure a lion rampant Ermine.
	Thomas Thorpe, Speaker of the House 1453-4 Blazon not available.
	Thomas Charlton, Speaker of the House 1454 Blazon not available.
	Sir John Wenlock (later Baron Wenlock), Speaker of the House 1455-6 Escutcheon: Or a cross formée extending to the extremities of the shield chequy Or and Sable. Crest: A wolf passant Sable.
	Thomas Tresham, Speaker of the House 1459 Blazon not available.
	John Green, Speaker of the House 1460 Escutcheon: Per fess Sable and Argent a lion rampant crowned counterchanged.

== Edward IV (1461–1483) ==
Arms	Name of Speaker and heraldic blazon
	Sir James Strangeways, Speaker of the House 1461-2 Escutcheon: Sable two lions passant paly of six Argent and Gules.
	William Alington, Speaker of the House 1472-8 Escutcheon: Sable a bend engrailed between six billets Argent. Crest: A talbot passant Ermine.
	John Wood, Speaker of the House 1483 Blazon not available.

No parliament was summoned during Edward V's brief reign.

== Richard III (1483–1485) ==
Arms	Name of Speaker and heraldic blazon
	William Catesby, Speaker of the House 1484 Escutcheon: Argent two lions passant Sable crowned Or.

== Henry VII (1485–1509) ==
Arms	Name of Speaker and heraldic blazon
	Sir Thomas Lovell, Speaker of the House 1485-8 Escutcheon: Or a chevron Azure between three squirrels sejant Gules. Crest: A peacock's tail erect Proper banded with a belt Sable rimmed and buckled Argent the end pendent.
	Sir John Mordaunt, Speaker of the House 1487-9 Escutcheon: Argent a chevron between three estoiles of six Sable. Crest: A Saracen's head in profile Proper wreathed about the temples Argent and Sable.
	Sir Thomas Fitzwilliam, Speaker of the House 1489–90 Escutcheon: Lozengy Argent and Gules.
	Sir Richard Empson, Speaker of the House 1490-2 Escutcheon: Argent two bends Sable.
	Sir Robert Drury, Speaker of the House 1495 Escutcheon: Argent on a chief vert a cross tau between two mullets pierced Or. as seen on the chest tomb of Sir Robert Drury Crest: A greyhound courant Proper. Motto: Non Sine Causâ
	Thomas Englefield, Speaker of the House 1496-7 and 1509–10 Escutcheon: Azure a griffin passant and a chief Or.
	Edmond Dudley, Speaker of the House 1503 Escutcheon: Or a lion rampant Azure a double quevée Vert.

== Henry VIII (1509–1547) ==
Arms	Name of Speaker and heraldic blazon
	Sir Robert Sheffield, Speaker of the House 1512-3 Escutcheon: Argent a chevron between three garbs Gules.
	Sir Thomas Nevill, Speaker of the House 1515 Escutcheon: Gules a saltire Argent.
	Sir Thomas More, Speaker of the House 1523 Escutcheon: Argent a chevron engrailed between three moorcocks Sable combs wattles and legs Gules. Crest: A moorcock's head affronté Sable.
	Sir Thomas Audley (later Baron Audley of Walden), Speaker of the House 1529–1533 Escutcheon: Quarterly per pale indented Or and Azure in the 2nd and 3rd an eagle displayed of the 1st on a bend of the 2nd a fret between two martlets of the 1st.
	Sir Humphrey Wingfield, Speaker of the House 1533-6 Escutcheon: Argent on a bend Gules cotised Sable three pairs of wings conjoined of the field.
	Sir Richard Rich, Speaker of the House 1536 Escutcheon: Gules a chevron between three cross crosslets Or.
	Sir Nicholas Hare, Speaker of the House 1539–40 Escutcheon: Gules two bars Or a chief indented of the last.
	Sir Thomas Moyle, Speaker of the House 1542-4 Escutcheon: Gules a mule passant within a bordure Argent.
	Sir John Baker, Speaker of the House 1545–52 Escutcheon: Azure on a fess between three swans' heads erased and ducally gorged Or as many cinquefoils Gules.

== Edward VI (1547–1553) ==
Arms	Name of Speaker and heraldic blazon
	Sir James Dyer, Speaker of the House 1553 Escutcheon: Or a chief indented Gules. Crest: Out of a coronet Or a goat's head Sable armed Gold.

== Mary I (1553–1558) ==
Arms	Name of Speaker and heraldic blazon
	Sir John Pollard, Speaker of the House 1553 and 1555 Escutcheon: Argent a chevron Sable between three escallops Gules.
	Robert Broke, Speaker of the House 1554 Escutcheon: Chequy Argent and Sable on a canton Vert a brock passant Proper. Crest: A brock passant Proper.
	Clement Higham, Speaker of the House 1554-5 Escutcheon: Sable a fess chequy Or and Azure between three horses' heads erased Argent. Crest: A horse's head erased Argent.
	William Cordell, Speaker of the House 1558-9 Escutcheon: Gules a chevron Ermine between three griffins' heads erased Argent.

== Elizabeth I (1558–1603) ==
Arms	Name of Speaker and heraldic blazon
	Sir Thomas Gargrave, Speaker of the House 1559 Escutcheon: Lozengy Or and Sable on a bend of the first three crescents of the second. Motto: Servire Deo Regnare Est
	Thomas Williams, Speaker of the House 1563 Escutcheon: Sable three curlews' heads erased Argent. Crest: A curlew Argent beaked and legged Or.
	Richard Onslow, Speaker of the House 1566–71 Escutcheon: Argent a fess Gules between six Cornish choughs Proper.
	Sir Christopher Wray, Speaker of the House 1571 Escutcheon: Azure on a chief Or three martlets Gules. Crest: An ostrich Or. Granted 30 December 1586 by Clarenceux Cooke.
	Robert Bell, Speaker of the House 1572–76 Escutcheon: Sable a fess Ermine between three bells Argent.
	John Puckering, Speaker of the House 1584-6 Escutcheon: Sable a bend fusily cottised Argent.
	Thomas Snagge, Speaker of the House 1589 Escutcheon: Argent three pheons Sable. Crest: A demi-goat Azure attired Or.
	Edward Coke, Speaker of the House 1592-3 Escutcheon: Party per pale Gules and Azure three eagles displayed Argent.
	Christopher Yelverton, Speaker of the House 1597-8 Escutcheon: Argent three lions rampant and a chief Gules.
	John Croke, Speaker of the House 1601 Escutcheon: Gules a fess between six martlets Argent.

== James I (1603–1625) ==
Arms	Name of Speaker and heraldic blazon
	Sir Edward Phelips, Speaker of the House 1603–1611 Escutcheon: Argent a chevron Gules between three roses Proper. Crest: A square beacon or chest on two wheels Or filled with fire Proper. Motto: Pro Aris Et Focis
	Sir Ranulph Crewe, Speaker of the House 1614 Escutcheon: Azure a lion rampant Argent. Crest: Out of a ducal coronet Or a lion's gamb erect Argent.
	Sir Thomas Richardson, Speaker of the House 1621–1622 Escutcheon: Argent on a chief Sable three lions' heads erased of the field. A canton Azure charged with St Andrew's cross Argent.
	Sir Thomas Crewe, Speaker of the House 1623–25 Escutcheon: Azure a lion rampant Argent. Crest: Out of a ducal coronet Or a lion's gamb erect Argent.

== Charles I (1625–1649) ==
Arms	Name of Speaker and heraldic blazon
	Sir Heneage Finch, Speaker of the House 1625-6 Escutcheon: Argent a chevron between three griffins passant Sable.
	Sir John Finch (later Baron Finch), Speaker of the House 1628-9 Escutcheon: Argent a chevron between three griffins passant Sable.
	John Glanville, Speaker of the House 1640 Escutcheon: Argent three Saltires Or. Crest: On a mount Vert a stag trippant Proper.
	William Lenthall, Speaker of the House 1640–47, 1647–53, 1654–55, 1659 and 1659–60 Escutcheon: Argent on a bend cotised Sable three mullets Or. Crest: A greyhound salient Sable collared Or.
	Henry Pelham, Speaker of the House 1647

== Interregnum (1649–1660) ==
Arms	Name of Speaker and heraldic blazon
	Francis Rous, Speaker of the House 1653 Escutcheon: Or an eagle displayed pruning its wings Azure with beak and bill Gules. Crest: A dove Argent.
	Sir Thomas Widdrington, Speaker of the House 1655–58 Escutcheon: Quarterly Argent and Gules a bend Sable.
	Sir Bulstrode Whitelocke, Speaker of the House 1657 Escutcheon: Quarterly, 1 and 4, Azure a chevron engrailed between three goshawks close Or (Whitelocke); 2 and 3, Argent on a bend gules three stags' heads erased Or (Bulstrode). Crest: On a tower argent a goshawk close or.
	Chaloner Chute, Speaker of the House 1658-9 Escutcheon: Gules three swords barways the points towards the dexter Proper pomels and hilts Or. Crest: A dexter cubit arm in armour the hand in a gauntlet grasping a broken sword in bend sinister Proper pomel and hilt Or.
	Sir Lislebone Long, Speaker of the House 1659 Escutcheon: Sable semée of crosses crosslet a lion rampant Argent.
	Thomas Bampfield, Speaker of the House 1659 Escutcheon: Or on a bend Gules three mullets Argent.
	Sir Harbottle Grimston, Speaker of the House 1660 Escutcheon: Argent on a fess Sable three mullets of six points Or pierced Gules in the dexter chief point an Ermine spot.

== Charles II (1660–1685) ==
Arms	Name of Speaker and heraldic blazon
	Sir Edward Turnour, Speaker of the House 1661–71 Escutcheon: Ermines on a cross pierced Argent four fers de molines Sable. Crest: On a wreath Argent and Sable a lion passant guardant holding in his paw a fer de moline Sable. Motto: Esse Quam Videri
	John Charlton, Speaker of the House 1672 Escutcheon: Or a lion rampant Gules a crescent for difference. Crest: On a wreath a leopard's head Gules.
	Edward Seymour, Speaker of the House 1673-8 and 1678-9 Escutcheon: Quarterly 1st & 4th Or on a pile Gules between six fleurs-de-lis Azure three lions of England (the coat of augmentation granted by King Henry VIII on his marriage with Lady Jane Seymour) 2nd & 3rd Gules two wings conjoined in lure the tips downwards Or.
	Sir Robert Sawyer, Speaker of the House 1678 Escutcheon: Or two bars Azure each charged with a barrulet dancettee Argent a chief indented of the second. Crest: A demi-lion Azure holding in the paws a saw erect Or.
	William Gregory, Speaker of the House 1679 Escutcheon: Or two bars Azure in chief a lion passant of the last. Crest: A demi-boar rampant Sable armed and collared Or.
	William Williams, Speaker of the House 1680–85 Escutcheon: Argent two foxes counter-salient Gules. Crest: An eagle displayed Or. Motto: Cadarn Ar Cyfrwjs
	Sir John Trevor, Speaker of the House 1685–87 and 1689–95 Escutcheon: Per bend sinister Ermine and Ermines a lion rampant Or.

== William III (1688–1702) ==
Arms	Name of Speaker and heraldic blazon
	Henry Powle, Speaker of the House 1688-9 Escutcheon: Argent a chevron Ermine between six lions rampant Or.
	Paul Foley, Speaker of the House 1695–98 Escutcheon: Argent a fess engrailed between three cinquefoils Sable within a bordure of the last. Crest: A lion rampant Argent holding between the fore-paws an escutcheon charged with the arms. Motto: Ut Prosim
	Sir Thomas Littleton, Speaker of the House 1698–1700 Escutcheon: Argent a chevron between three escallops Sable.
	Robert Harley (later Earl of Oxford and Earl Mortimer), Speaker of the House 1701–05 Escutcheon: Or a bend cotised Sable.
	John Smith, Speaker of the House 1705-6 Escutcheon: Quarterly: 1st & 4th: azure, two bars between three pheons or (for Smith) 2nd & 3rd: Argent, a mullet pierced sable (for Assheton)

Following the Acts of Union 1707, Smith became the first Speaker of the House of Commons of Great Britain.

== See also ==
- Armorial of the speakers of the British House of Commons
- Armorial of Lords of Appeal
- Armorial of Lord High Chancellors of Great Britain
- Armorial of prime ministers of the United Kingdom
