= Armorial of the speakers of the British House of Commons =

Armorial of the speakers of the House of Commons is displayed at the House of Commons in the Palace of Westminster. Speakers customarily take a grant of arms while in office, if they are not armigerous already. Their shields of arms are painted on the interior walls of Speaker's House, and after their elevation to the peerage they are displayed on the windows along the peers' staircase in the House of Lords.

Prior to the Acts of Union 1707, John Smith had been Speaker of the House of Commons of England.

== Speakers of the House of Commons of Great Britain ==
Arms	Name of Speaker (including peerage title, if any) and heraldic blazon
	John Smith, Speaker of the House 1707–1708 Escutcheon: Quarterly: 1st & 4th: azure, two bars between three pheons or (for Smith) 2nd & 3rd: Argent, a mullet pierced sable (for Assheton)
	Richard Onslow, 1st Baron Onslow, Speaker of the House 1708–1710 Crest: An Eagle Sable, preying on a Partridge proper Escutcheon: Argent, a Fess Gules, between six Cornish Choughs proper Supporters: On either side a Falcon close proper, belled Or.
	Sir William Bromley, Speaker of the House 1710–1713 Escutcheon: Quarterly per fess indented Gules and Or an escutcheon Argent charged with a griffin segreant Vert; Crest: Out of a ducal coronet Or a demi-lion Argent supporting a banner Gules charged with a lion passant Gold staff of the last (the standard of Guiénne).
	Sir Thomas Hanmer, Speaker of the House 1714–1715 Escutcheon: Argent two lions passant guardant azure, armed and langued gules Crest: On a chapeau Azure turned up Ermine a lion guardant sejant Argent; Motto: Garde l'Honneur ("Maintain honour")
	Spencer Compton, 1st Earl of Wilmington, Speaker of the House 1715–1727 Arms: Sable a Lion passant guardant Or between three Esquires' Helmets Argent; Crest: A Buck at gaze Argent attired Or; Supporters: On either side a Bull Argent armed and unguled proper; Motto: Tout bien ou rien
	Arthur Onslow, Speaker of the House 1727–1761 Escutcheon: Argent a fess Gules between six Cornish choughs Proper. Crest: An eagle Sable preying upon a partridge Or. Motto: Semper Fidelis
	Sir John Cust, Speaker of the House 1761–1770 Crest: A Lion's Head erased Sable gorged with a Collar paly wavy of six Argent and Azure; Escutcheon: Ermine on a Chevron Sable three Fountains proper Supporters: On either side a Lion reguardant Argent each gorged with a Collar paly wavy of six Argent and Azure; Motto: Esse Quam Videri ("To be, rather than to seem")
	Fletcher Norton, 1st Baron Grantley, Speaker of the House 1770–1780 Crest: A Moor's Head affrontée couped at the shoulders wreathed round the temples with Laurel proper and around the neck a Torse Argent and Azure; Escutcheon: Azure a Maunch Ermine surmounted by a Bend Gules; Supporters: Dexter: a Lion; Sinister: a Griffin, both Argent and ducally gorged Or and pendent from the coronets by a Ribbon Gules a Shield of the Arms of Norton; Motto: Avi Numerantur Avorum (I follow a long line of ancestry)
	Charles Wolfran Cornwall, Speaker of the House 1780–1789 Crest: A lion rampant Gules ducally crowned Or within a bordure engrailed sable bezanty.
	William Grenville, 1st Baron Grenville, Speaker of the House 1789 Escutcheon: Quarterly, 1st and 4th, Vert on a Cross Argent five Torteaux Gules (Grenville); 2nd, Or an Eagle displayed Sable (Leofric, Earl of Mercia); 3rd, Argent two Bars Sable each charged with three Martlets Or (Temple); Crest: A Garb Vert; Supporters: On the dexter side a Lion per fess embattled Gules and Or and on the sinister side a Horse Argent semé of Eaglets Sable with both supporters collared Argent banded Vert charged with three Torteaux counterchanged Motto: Repetens exempla suorum (Following the example set by our forebears)
	Henry Addington, 1st Viscount Sidmouth, Speaker of the House 1789–1801 Crest: A Cat-a-mountain sejant guardant Proper bezanty the dexter forepaw resting on an inescutcheon Azure charged with a Mace erect surmounted with a Regal Crown Or within a Bordure engrailed Argent; Escutcheon: Per pale Ermine and Erminés a Chevron charged with five Lozenges counterchanged between three Fleurs-de-lis Or; Supporters: On either side a Stag, the dexter Erminés and the sinister Ermine, both attired and gorged with a Chain pendant therefrom a Key all Or; Motto: Libertas sub rege pio ("Liberty under a pious King")

== Speakers of the House of Commons of the United Kingdom ==
=== Speakers in the nineteenth century ===
Arms	Name of Speaker (including peerage title, if any) and heraldic blazon
	John Freeman-Mitford, 1st Baron Redesdale, Speaker of the House 1801–1802 Crest: 1st: two Hands couped at the wrist proper grasping a Sword erect piercing a Boar's Head erased Sable (Mitford); 2nd: a Demi Wolf Argent charged on the shoulder with a Fess dancetty Gules and holding between the paws a Lozenge Or (Freeman); Escutcheon: Quarterly: 1st and 4th, Argent a Fess between three Moles Sable (Mitford); 2nd and 3rd, Azure three Lozenges conjoined in fess Or a Canton Ermine (Freeman); Supporters: On either side an Eagle wings expanded Sable beaked and membered Or charged on the breast with a Lozenge also Or and gorged with a wreath of Shamrock Vert; Motto: God Careth For Us
	Charles Abbot, 1st Baron Colchester, Speaker of the House 1802–1817 Escutcheon: Gules, on a chevron between three pears Or as many crosses raguly Azure within a tressure flory of the second. Crest: Out of a ducal coronet Or, a unicorn's head Ermine maned and tufted of the first between six ostrich feathers Argent quilled Gold. Supporters: On either side a unicorn Ermine maned hoofed and tufted Or, gorged with a collar Azure within another gemel flory counter-flory Gules therefrom a chain reflexed over the back Gold and charged on the shoulder with a cross raguly of the third. Motto: Deo Patriae Amicis
	Charles Manners-Sutton, 1st Viscount Canterbury, Speaker of the House 1817–1835 Escutcheon: Quarterly, 1st & 4th: Argent, a canton sable (Sutton) 2nd & 3rd: Or, two bars azure, a chief quarterly azure and gules, the 1st and 4th quarters charged with two fleurs-de-lis or, and the 2nd and 3rd a lion of England (Manners); Supporters:On either side a Unicorn Argent armed maned tufted and unguled Or, around the neck of the dexter supporter a Chain Or pendent therefrom an Escutcheon Azure charged with a Mace erect Gold, around the neck of the sinister supporter a like Chain pendent therefrom an Escutcheon also Azure charged with an Archiepiscopal Mitre also gold jewelled proper Motto: Pour y Parvenir
	James Abercromby, 1st Baron Dunfermline, Speaker of the House 1835–1839 Escutcheon: Argent a Fess embattled Gules therefrom issuant in chief a Dexter Arm embowed in Armour proper garnished Or encircled by a Wreath of Laurel the hand supporting the French Standard in bend sinister also proper in base (for Abercromby) a Chevron indented Gules between three Boars' Heads erased Azure; Crest: A Bee erect proper Supporters: On either side a Greyhound per fess Argent and Or each plain collared with a Line reflexed over the back Gules and suspended from the collar a Shield Azure charged with the Speaker's Mace in pale gold and charged on the shoulder with a Thistle proper Motto: Vive ut vivas
	Charles Shaw-Lefevre, 1st Viscount Eversley, Speaker of the House 1839–1857 Crest: Six Arrows interlaced saltirewise three and three proper within an Annulet Or. Escutcheon: Quarterly 1st & 4th Sable a chevron Argent between in chief two trefoils slipped Or and in base a bezant therefrom issuant a cross pattée of the third (Lefevre) 2nd & 3rd Sable a chevron Ermine on a canton Or a talbot's head erased Gules (Shaw). Supporters: On either side a talbot that on the dexter Gules on the sinister Sable each charged on the shoulder with a mace erect Gold. Motto: Sans Changer
	Evelyn Denison, 1st Viscount Ossington, Speaker of the House 1857–1872 Escutcheon: Argent a bend Gules between a unicorn's head erased in chief and a cross crosslet fitchée in base Azure. Crest: A dexter arm vested Gules cuffed Argent pointing with the forefinger to an estoile Or.
	Henry Brand, 1st Viscount Hampden, Speaker of the House 1872–1884 Crest: Out of a crown vallary Or a leopard's head Argent semée of escallops and gorged with a collar gemel Gules. Escutcheon: Azure two swords in saltire points upwards Argent pommelled and hilted Or between three escallops one in chief and two in fess Or. Supporters: Dexter a wolf Argent gorged with a radiated collar with line reflexed over the back Or sinister a bull Gules armed unguled ducally gorged and line reflexed over the back Or.
	Arthur Peel, 1st Viscount Peel, Speaker of the House 1884–1895 Escutcheon: Argent three sheaves of three arrows Proper two and one banded Gules on a chief Azure a bee volant Or. Crest: A demi-lion rampant Argent gorged with a collar Azure charged with three bezants, holding between the paws a Shuttle Or. Supporters: Dexter a lion reguardant Argent sinister a gryphon reguardant Or both gorged with a chain Or pendent therefrom an escutcheon Azure charged with a mace erect Or.
	William Gully, 1st Viscount Selby, Speaker of the House 1895–1905 Crest: Between two wings erect Or an arm vested Sable cuffed Argent the hand grasping a sword erect Proper. Escutcheon: Argent a lion rampant Sable between four escallops Gules on a chief of the last as many escallops Or. Supporters: Dexter an owl Sable charged with a balance Or sinister an eagle Sable charged with a portcullis Or. Motto: Nec Temere Nec Tarde ("Neither Rashly Nor Slowly")

=== Speakers in the twentieth century ===
Arms	Name of Speaker (including peerage title, if any) and heraldic blazon
	James Lowther, 1st Viscount Ullswater, Speaker of the House 1905–1921 Crest: A dragon passant Argent; Escutcheon: Or six annulets three two and one a crescent for difference all Sable. Supporters: On either side a horse Argent gorged with a wreath of laurel Vert and charged on the shoulder with a portcullis chained Or. Motto: Magistratum Indicat Virum ("The Office Shows The Man")
	John Henry Whitley, Speaker of the House 1921–1928 Blazon not available
	Edward FitzRoy, Speaker of the House 1928–1943 Escutcheon: The Royal Arms of Charles II, viz. Quarterly: 1st and 4th, France and England quarterly; 2nd, Scotland; 3rd, Ireland; the whole debruised by a Baton sinister compony of six pieces Argent and Azure.
	Douglas Clifton Brown, 1st Viscount Ruffside, Speaker of the House 1943–1951 Escutcheon: Gules a chevron between in chief two bears' paws erect erased and armed and in base four hands issuant conjoined in saltire Or on a chief engrailed also Or an eagle displayed Sable. Crest: Issuant from a wreath of oak Vert a bear's paw armed Or holding a sinister hand in bend Proper. Torse: Or and Gules. Mantling: Gules doubled Or.
	William Morrison, 1st Viscount Dunrossil, Speaker of the House 1951–1959 Crest: A Viking galley with one mast and sail furled proper flying from the masthead a pennon Argent charged with a raven volant Sable. Escutcheon: Azure on a Pale Ermine between two Gannets reversed volant to the dexter their wings expanded palewise proper a representation of the Mace of the House of Commons Or. Motto: An Tighnearna Mo Bhuachaille (The Lord is my Shepherd); Granted by the College of arms on 14 August 1953.
	William Morrison, 1st Viscount Dunrossil, Speaker of the House 1951–1959 Crest: Issuant from waves of the Sea Azure crested Argent a Mount Vert thereon an embattled Wall Azure masoned Argent charged with a Portcullis Or and issuant therefrom a Cubit Arm naked proper the hand grasping a Dagger Azure hilted Or. Escutcheon: Per bend sinister Gules and Argent a Demi-Lion rampant issuant Or armed and langued Azure holding in his paws a Battleaxe the Shaft curved of the third and the Axehead of the fourth in chief and in base issuant from the Sea undy Vert and Or a Tower Sable Windows and Port Or over all a Bend sinister embattled Azure charged with an Open Crown Or jewelled Gules between two Fleurs-de-lys Argent; within a Bordure Vert for difference. Supporters: On either side a Lion regardant Or armed and langued Gules collared Vert supporting between the exterior forepaw and interior hindpaw a Battleaxe Azure the shaft embowed Motto: Above the Crest: Teaghlach Phabbay (The household or family of Phabbay); Below the Shield: An Tighnearna Mo Bhuachaille ("The Lord is my Shepherd"); Granted by the Lyon Court on 18 April 1960.
	Sir Harry Hylton-Foster, Speaker of the House 1959–1965 Escutcheon: Argent on a fess Vert between three bugle-horns Sable stringed Or a representation of the Speaker's Mace in fess head to the dexter Or a bordure Vert. Crest: In front of a bugle-horn as in the arms a greyhound courant Argent.
	Horace King, Baron Maybray-King, Speaker of the House 1965–1971 Escutcheon: Argent a cherub Proper within a chaplet of four roses, two in pale Argent and two in fess Gules, barbed seeded and leaved proper Crest: A mace Or and a spade the blade upwards in saltire Proper. Supporters: On either side a bittern Proper. Motto: Sinite Parvulos
	Selwyn Lloyd, Baron Selwyn-Lloyd, Speaker of the House 1971–1976 Escutcheon: Per pale Azure and Or on a fess per pale Or and Gules between in chief two bees volant and in base a garb all counterchanged a dragon passant per pale Gules and Or. Crest: On a demi golf ball a seapie Proper. Mantling: Azure and Gules doubled Or. Torse: Or Azure and Gules.
	George Thomas, 1st Viscount Tonypandy, Speaker of the House 1976–1983 Escutcheon: Or an open book proper bound Sable garnished Gules. On a chief of the last between two portcullises Or a pale per pale Argent and Or, charged with three chevrons gules. Crest: A miner's lamp between two daffodils slipped and leaved proper. Motto: Bid Ben Bid Bont ("Let the leader be a bridge")
	Bernard Weatherill, Baron Weatherill, Speaker of the House 1983–1992 Crest: A Horse rampant Argent supporting a Mace erect Or; Escutcheon: Azure a Cross Floretty Or surmounting two Lances in saltire proper flying from each a Forked Pennon per fess Gules and Argent; Supporters: Dexter: a Captain of the 19th King George V's Own Lancers (Indian Army); Sinister: a Knight of Justice of the Most Venerable Order of the Hospital of St John of Jerusalem, both proper Motto: "A stitch in time"
	Betty Boothroyd, Baroness Boothroyd, Speaker of the House 1992–2000 Escutcheon: Gules, a representation of the mace of the Speaker of the House of Commons palewise Or surmounted in base by a rose Argent barbed and seeded Proper over all on a fess Gold an owl guardant Proper between two millrinds Sable. Motto: "I speak to serve"

=== Speakers in the twenty-first century ===
Arms	Name of Speaker (including peerage title, if any) and heraldic blazon
	Michael Martin, Baron Martin of Springburn, Speaker of the House 2000–2009 Escutcheon: Per chevron Gules and Sable, on a chevron Argent between in chief a martin volant Or between dexter a locomotive wheel partially covered by a cowling and sinister a salmon hauriant with a signet ring in its mouth both Proper and in base a lymphad of the Third flagged Gules sail chequy Azure and Argent, a crescent Sable between an engineer's steel footrule and a chanter both Proper. Crest: A kestrel wings surgeant-tergiant Proper. Motto: Tha Mi A's Stri A Bhi Cothromach (I Strive To Be Fair)
	John Bercow, Speaker of the House 2009–2019 Escutcheon: Per pale Azure and Gules four roundels in bend Or between the rungs of a ladder bendwise throughout Argent all between two seaxes bendwise points upwards and cutting edges outwards Or. Crest: Upon a helm with a wreath Or Azure and Gules in front of a demi swan wings inverted and expanded Proper gorged with a coronet Or and holding in its beak a Pink triangle Proper a portcullis sans chains Or within an annulet per pale Gules and Azure all in front of a rainbow Proper. Mantling: Azure and Gules lined Or. Motto: All Are Equal; Badge: In front of a seaxe fesswise point to the sinister and cutting edge upwards Or a wyvern Azure legged and tailed Gules charged on the wings with bezants (four being manifest) grasping with its claws the quillons of the seaxe.
	Sir Lindsay Hoyle, Speaker of the House 2019–present Escutcheon: Argent on a Fess conjoined to a Bordure Vert and between three Roses Gules barbed proper each charged with a Bee volant Or striped Sable winged Argent the House of Commons Mace fesswise Or; Crest: Upon a Helm Issuant from a Palisado Crown Or a demi heraldic Antelope Argent attired tufted and unguled Or gorged with a Collar pendent therefrom a Key wards downwards and to the dexter and holding between the legs a Rugby Ball Gules; Mantling: Gules lined Argent. Motto: Cernimur In Agendo (We Are Seen In Action)

== See also ==
- Armorial of the speakers of the English House of Commons
- Armorial of Lords of Appeal
- Armorial of Lord High Chancellors of Great Britain
- Armorial of prime ministers of the United Kingdom
