= Nina Hosali =

British philanthropist, artist and author

Nina Hosali MBE
- Born: 23 October 1898
- Died: 14 January 1987 (aged 88)
- Education: University College London (Bsc; MSc)
- Occupations: Philanthropist, artist and author

Nina Moti Hosali (23 October 1898 – 14 January 1987) was a British philanthropist, artist and author. She co-founded Working Animals International, founded the Nature Cure Clinic and played a key role in the Margaret Morris Movement and Free Painters and Sculptors.

== Early life ==
Nina Hosali was born in St John's Wood, London, on 23 October 1898 to a Scottish mother (Kate Hosali) and an Indian father (Devendranath Hosali). When Nina was born, her mother would not move to India with Nina's father, but she vowed to raise their daughter in his name. Hosali spent her early childhood in Glasgow and returned to live in London when she was 11 years old. She studied for her BSc in mathematics at University College London, and went on to study seismology for her MSc. Her paper, "A note describing models illustrating crystal-line form and symmetry" was published by The Faraday Society in 1920, and her paper "On Seismic Waves in a Visco-Elastic Earth", was published by the Royal Society in 1923.

== Career ==
In November 1920, Nina and her mother Frances Kate Hosali set out on a tour of North Africa, including Algeria, Tunisia and Morocco. They witnessed widespread suffering and malnourishment of working animals, including donkeys, horses, mules and camels.

When Nina and her mother returned to England in April 1922, Nina had intended to work at a seismological observatory, but they could not forget the animal suffering that they had witnessed during their tour. They established The Society for the Protection of Animals Abroad (SPANA) on 2 October 1923 to support the welfare of working animals in North Africa. Hosali retired from working for The Society for the Protection of Animals Abroad in 1963 (SPANA was renamed Working Animals International in April 2026).

Nina worked full-time at SPANA for 40 years as organising secretary. In 1963, she was appointed SPANA's honorary secretary and partly retired from the charity. She was appointed an MBE in the 1976 Birthday Honours list for services to the welfare of animals, particularly in North Africa.

== Philanthropy ==
In 1928, Hosali founded the Nature Cure Clinic. Based in London, the clinic specialised in natural healing and vegetarianism. It provided free treatment to those with limited means.

In 1977, Hosali provided assistance to veterinarian Marguerite Silverman to establish the Society for Animal Welfare in Israel.

Hosali was a supporter of the Margaret Morris Movement, a dance school for children established by the dancer Margaret Morris. In 1981, Nina gifted her home in Biggin Hill to the Margaret Morris Movement.

== Art ==
Hosali was a Fellow of the Royal Society of Arts and her work was exhibited widely.

She was also involved in establishing the London-based artist group Free Painters and Sculptors, for which she was a member, secretary and Fellow. In 1972, Nina helped the group establish an art space called the Loggia Gallery at 15 Buckingham Gate, London.

== Writing ==
In 1944, Children of Allah, a collection of 26 poems inspired by Hosali's visits to North Africa, was published. The book was reprinted in 1977 to include an expanded collection of poems inspired by the English countryside and Nina's experiences as an ARP Warden during the London Blitz.

In 1978, Hosali published her book Kate, Who Was Called the Toubiba – The SPANA Story, in which she wrote about her life and career at SPANA.

== Death ==
Hosali died on 14 January 1987, in Bromley.

== Publications ==
- A note describing models illustrating crystal-line form and symmetry, 1920
- Hosali, Nina M. (1923). "On Seismic Waves in a Visco-Elastic Earth". Proceedings of the Royal Society of London. Series A, Containing Papers of a Mathematical and Physical Character. 104 (725). The Royal Society: 271–278. Bibcode:1923RSPSA.104..271H. doi:10.1098/rspa.1923.0108. ISSN 0950-1207. JSTOR 94131.
- Children of Allah, 1944
- Kate who was called the Toubiba – The SPANA Story, 1978
