= List of awards and honours received by Clement Attlee =

Clement Attlee received numerous honours in recognition of his career in politics. These included:

== Hereditary peerage ==
Attlee was elevated to the House of Lords on 16 December 1955, upon his standing down as leader of the Labour Party and from his seat in the House of Commons. He took the title Earl Attlee, with the subsidiary title of Viscount Prestwood, of Walthamstow in the County of Essex. He sat with the Labour Party benches.

== Coat of arms ==
As a peer of the realm, Attlee was entitled to use a personal coat of arms.

Coat of arms of Clement Attlee
Coronet A coronet of an Earl Crest On a Mount Vert two Lions addorsed Or Escutcheon Azure, on a Chevron Or between three Hearts of the Last winged Argent as many Lions rampant Sable Supporters On either side a Welsh Terrier sejant Proper Motto Labor vincit omnia (Labour conquers all)

== Commonwealth honours ==
=== Commonwealth realms ===
Country	Date	Decoration	Post-nominal letters
United Kingdom	1935	Member of Her Majesty's Most Honourable Privy Council	PC
Commonwealth realms	8 June 1945	Member of the Order of the Companions of Honour	CH
Commonwealth realms	5 November 1951	Member of the Order of Merit	OM
England	7 April 1956	Knight Companion of the Order of the Garter	KG
United Kingdom	Unknown	Knight of Justice of the Order of St John	

||

=== Decorations and medals ===
Country	Date	Decoration	Post-nominal letters
United Kingdom	1919	1914–15 Star	
United Kingdom	26 July 1919	British War Medal	
United Kingdom	1 September 1919	WWI Victory Medal	

== Other distinctions ==
Country	Date	Organisation	Position
United Kingdom	1961–1962	Association of Municipal Corporations	President
United Kingdom	Unknown	Worshipful Company of Innholders	Freeman and Liveryman

=== University degrees ===
Location	Date	School	Degree
England	1904	University College, Oxford	Second-class honours Bachelor of Arts (BA) in Modern History
England	March 1906	Inner Temple	Called to the bar

=== Chancellor, visitor, governor, rector and fellowships ===
Location	Date	School	Position
England	15 December 1948	Queen Mary College	Honorary Fellow
England	Unknown	University College, Oxford	Honorary Fellow
England	Unknown	London School of Economics	Honorary Fellow

=== Honorary degrees ===
Location	Date	School	Degree
England	1946	University of Cambridge	Doctor of Laws (LL.D.)
England	1946	University of Oxford	Doctor of Civil Law (DCL)
Wales	1949	University of Wales	Doctor of Laws (LL.D.)
Scotland	21 June 1951	University of Glasgow	Doctor of Laws (LL.D.)
England	1953	University of Nottingham	Doctor of Laws (LL.D.)
Ceylon	Unknown	University of Ceylon	Doctor of Laws (LL.D.)
India	Unknown	University of Madras	Doctor of Laws (LL.D.)
England	Unknown	University of Reading	Doctor of Letters (D.Litt.)
England	Unknown	University of London	Doctor of Laws (LL.D.)
Scotland	Unknown	University of Aberdeen	Doctor of Laws (LL.D.)
England	Unknown	University of Hull	Doctor of Laws (LL.D.)
England	Unknown	University of Bristol	Doctor of Laws (LL.D.)

=== Memberships and fellowships ===
Country	Date	Organisation	Position
United Kingdom	1946	Inner Temple	Honorary Bencher
United Kingdom	1947	Royal Society	Fellow (FRS)
United Kingdom	Unknown	Royal Institute of British Architects	Honorary Fellow (FRIBA)

== Freedom of the city ==
- (England) 18 October 1947: Birmingham
- (England) 18 December 1951: Leeds
- (England) 20 November 1953: London
- (England) 1953: Manchester
- (England) 16 January 1956: Oxford
- (Scotland) 5 June 1956: Aberdeen
- (England) Unknown: Bristol

== Places named after Attlee ==
- (England) Attlee A-level Academy at the New City College
- (England) Attlee Way, Leicester 52.5974212°N 1.1350528°W
- (England) The Clement Attlee Estate, Fulham

== Limerick ==
Attlee referred to his many honours in a limerick he composed about his career:

There were few who thought him a starter,
Many who thought themselves smarter.
But he ended PM,
CH and OM,
an Earl and a Knight of the Garter.
