= Armorial of prime ministers of the United Kingdom =

Most prime ministers of the United Kingdom have enjoyed the right to display coats of arms and to this day, prime ministers have their ancestral arms approved, or new armorial bearings granted, either by the College of Arms or the Lyon Court.

== Arms of prime ministers by century ==
=== 18th century ===
Escutcheon	Name of prime minister (including peerage title, if any) and heraldic blazon	Full achievement
	Arms of Robert Walpole, Prime Minister and First Lord of the Treasury, 1721–1742 Escutcheon: Quarterly of nine, 1st Or on a Fess between two Chevrons Sable three Cross-crosslets of the Field; 2nd Vert a Lion rampant Or two Goutte d'sang; 3rd Gules a saltire engrailed Argent; 4th Azure a Chevron between three crosses Or; 5th Vert a saltire Or; 6th Argent on a fess engrailed between three Escutcheons Gules three mullets pierced Or; 7th Argent between three Cross-crosslets fitchée a fess Gules; 8th Or between three Oak leaves proper a chevron Ermine; 9th Argent between a saltire Azure four gryphon heads Gules. Coronet: that of an Earl Crest: A Saracen's Head in profile couped at the shoulders Proper, ducally-crowned Or and from the Coronet flowing a Chapeau Rouge turned down in front tasselled and charged with a Catherine Wheel Or Motto: Sibi constant (Be true unto oneself) (The arms were also displayed with no quartering and only the simple arms of Walpole).	
	Arms of Spencer Compton, 1st Earl of Wilmington, Prime Minister and First Lord of the Treasury, 1742–1743 Escutcheon: Sable a Lion passant guardant Or between three Esquires' Helms Argent Coronet: that of an Earl Crest: On a Mount a Beacon fired Proper behind it a ribbon inscribed: Nisi Dominus (If no God, nothing) Motto: Je ne cherche qu'Un (I seek but One)	
	Arms of Henry Pelham, Prime Minister and First Lord of the Treasury, 1743–1754 Escutcheon: Quarterly, 1 & 3, Azure, three pelicans argent vulning themselves in the breast gules; 2 & 3, Gules, two belts issuing out of the base argent, buckles and studs or. Crest: A Peacock in its pride Argent Motto: Vincit amor patriæ ("Love of my country prevails")	
	Arms of Thomas Pelham-Holles, 1st Duke of Newcastle, Prime Minister and First Lord of the Treasury, 1754–1756 and 1757–1762 Escutcheon: Quarterly, 1st & 4th, Azure three Pelicans vulning themselves Proper; 2nd & 3rd, Ermine two Piles in point Sable. Coronet: that of a Duke Crest: A Peacock in pride Proper Motto: Vicit amor patria (The love of my country prevails).	
	Arms of William Cavendish, 4th Duke of Devonshire, Prime Minister and First Lord of the Treasury, 1756–1757 Escutcheon: Sable three Bucks' Heads cabossed Argent, with a Crescent for difference Coronet: that of a Duke Crest: A Serpent nowed Proper Supporters: On the dexter side a Bull Or ducally-crowned Gules and on the sinister side a Lion rampant guardant Gules crined and ducally-crowned Or Motto: Cavendo tutus (Secure by caution)	
	Arms of John Stuart, 3rd Earl of Bute, Prime Minister and First Lord of the Treasury, 1762–1763 Escutcheon: Or a Fess chequy Azure and Argent within a Double Tressure flory-counterflory Gules Coronet: that of an Earl Crest: A Demi-lion rampant Gules Motto: Nobilis est ira leonis (Noble is the lion's wrath)	
	Arms of George Grenville, Prime Minister and First Lord of the Treasury, 1763–1765 Escutcheon: Vert on a Cross Argent five Torteaux Gules Crest: A Garb Vert Motto: Repetens exempla suorum (Following the example set by our forebears)	
	Arms of William Pitt, 1st Earl of Chatham, Prime Minister and First Lord of the Treasury, 1766–1768 Escutcheon: Sable a Fess chequy Argent and Azure between three Bezants Or Coronet: that of an Earl Crest: A Stork Proper beaked and membered Or resting the dexter claw on an Anchor erect cabled of the Last Motto: Benigno numine (By Divine providence)	
	Arms of Augustus FitzRoy, 3rd Duke of Grafton, Prime Minister and First Lord of the Treasury, 1768–1770 Escutcheon: Royal arms of King Charles II (differenced), viz: grandquarterly, 1st and 4th, France and England quarterly; 2nd, Scotland; 3rd, Ireland; the whole debruised by a Baton sinister compony of six pieces Argent and Azure Coronet: that of a Duke Crest: On a Chapeau Gules doubled Ermine a Lion statant guardant Or crowned with a ducal-coronet Azure and gorged with a Collar countercompony Argent and of the Fourth Motto: Et decus et pretium recti (By Grace, the prize of rectitude)	
	Arms of Frederick North, 2nd Earl of Guilford, Prime Minister and First Lord of the Treasury, 1770–1782 Escutcheon: Azure a Lion passant between three Fleurs-de-lis Argent Coronet: that of an Earl Crest: A Dragon's Head erased Sable ducally-gorged and chained Or Supporters: On either side a Mastiff Proper Mottos: La vertu est la seule noblesse (Virtue is the only nobility); Animo et fide (With courage and Faith)	
	Arms of Charles Watson-Wentworth, 2nd Marquess of Rockingham, Prime Minister and First Lord of the Treasury, 1782 Escutcheon: Quarterly, 1st and 4th, Argent on a Chevron engrailed Azure between three Martlets Sable as many Crescents Or (Watson); 2nd and 3rd, Sable a Chevron between three Leopards' Faces Or (Wentworth) Coronet: that of a Marquess Crest: A Griffin passant wings elevated Argent beaked forelegged and ducally-gorged Or Supporters: On the dexter side a Griffin Argent beaked and forelegged Gules collared vairé Ermine and Azure and on the sinister side a Lion Or collared vairé Ermine and Gules Mottos: Mea gloria fides (Trust is my renown); En Dieu est tout (In God is all)	
	Arms of William Petty, 2nd Earl of Shelburne, Prime Minister and First Lord of the Treasury 1782–1783 Escutcheon: Quarterly, 1st and 4th, Ermine on a Bend Azure a Magnetic Needle pointing at a Polar Star Or (Petty); 2nd and 3rd, Argent a Saltire Gules a Chief Ermine (FitzMaurice) Coronet: that of an Earl Crests: 1st, a Beehive beset with Bees diversely volant Proper (Petty); 2nd, a Centaur drawing a Bow and Arrow Proper the equine part from the waist Argent (FitzMaurice) Supporters: On either side a Pegasus Ermine bridled crined winged and unguled Or each charged on the shoulder with a Fleur-de-lis Azure Motto: Virtute non verbis (By courage not words)	
	Arms of William Cavendish-Bentinck, 3rd Duke of Portland, Prime Minister and First Lord of the Treasury, 1783 and 1807–1809 Escutcheon: Quarterly, 1st and 4th, Azure a Cross Moline Argent (Bentinck); 2nd and 3rd, Sable three Stags' Heads cabossed Argent attired Or with a Crescent for difference (Cavendish) Coronet: that of a Duke Crests: 1st, Issuant from a ducal coronet Proper two Arms counter-embowed vested Gules on the hands Gloves Or each holding an Ostrich Feather Argent (Bentinck); 2nd, a Snake nowed Proper (Cavendish) Supporters: On either side a Lion double-queued the dexter Or and the sinister Sable Motto: Craignez honte (Fear dishonour)	
	Arms of William Pitt the Younger, Prime Minister and First Lord of the Treasury, 1783–1801 and 1804–1806 Escutcheon: Sable a Fess chequy Argent and Azure between three Bezants Or, with a Crescent for difference Crest: A Stork Proper beaked and membered Or resting the dexter claw on an Anchor erect cabled of the Last Motto: Benigno numine (By Divine providence) (The patrilineal arms of The Hon. (later Rt. Hon.) William Pitt were cadenced from birth; he became the first PM following the Act of Union 1800 which merged Great Britain and Ireland to form the United Kingdom)	

=== 19th century ===
Escutcheon	Name of prime minister (including peerage title, if any) and heraldic blazon	Full achievement
	Arms of Henry Addington, 1st Viscount Sidmouth, Prime Minister and First Lord of the Treasury, 1801–1804 Escutcheon: Per pale Ermine and Erminés a Chevron charged with five Lozenges counterchanged between three Fleurs-de-lis Or Coronet: that of a Viscount Crest: A Cat-a-mountain sejant guardant Proper bezanty the dexter forepaw resting on an inescutcheon Azure charged with a Mace erect surmounted with a Regal Crown Or within a Bordure engrailed Argent Supporters: On either side a Stag the dexter Erminés the sinister Ermine both attired and gorged with a Chain pendant therefrom a Key all Or Motto: Libertas sub rege pio (Liberty under a pious King)	
	Arms of William Grenville, 1st Baron Grenville, Prime Minister and First Lord of the Treasury 1806–1807 Escutcheon: Quarterly, 1st and 4th, Vert on a Cross Argent five Torteaux Gules (Grenville); 2nd, Or an Eagle displayed Sable (Leofric, Earl of Mercia); 3rd, Argent two Bars Sable each charged with three Martlets Or (Temple) Coronet: that of a Baron Crest: A Garb Vert Supporters: On the dexter side a Lion per fess embattled Gules and Or and on the sinister side a Horse Argent semé of Eaglets Sable with both supporters collared Argent banded Vert charged with three Torteaux counterchanged Motto: Repetens exempla suorum (Following the example set by our forebears)	
	Arms of Spencer Perceval, Prime Minister and First Lord of the Treasury 1809–1812 Escutcheon: Argent on a chief indented gules three crosses pattées of the field Crest: A thistle proper erect Motto: (Below) Sub cruce candida ("Under the Holy Cross") (Above) Yvery Supporters: On either side an eagle volant sable	
	Arms of Robert Jenkinson, 2nd Earl of Liverpool, Prime Minister and First Lord of the Treasury 1812–1827 Escutcheon: Azure a Fess wavy Argent charged with a Cross Pattée Gules in chief two Estoiles Or and as an augmentation of honour granted to his father the 1st Earl of Liverpool, upon a Chief wavy of the Second a Cormorant Sable beaked and legged of the Third holding in the beak a Seaweed (or Liver) branch inverted Vert (for Liverpool) Coronet: that of an Earl Crest: A Seahorse assurgent Argent maned Azure supporting a Cross Pattée Gules Supporters: On either side a Hawk wings elevated and inverted Proper beaked legged and belled Or charged on the breast with a Cross Pattée Gules Motto: Palma non sine pulvere ("Dare to try")	
	Arms of George Canning, Prime Minister and First Lord of the Treasury, 1827 Escutcheon: Argent three Moors' Heads in profile two and one couped Proper wreathed about the temples of the First and Azure Crest: A Demi-lion rampant Argent charged with three Trefoils Vert holding in its dexter paw an Arrow pointing downwards pheoned and flighted Proper shaft Or Motto: Ne cede malis ced contra ("Yield not to misfortunes, but counter them")	
	Arms of Frederick Robinson, 1st Viscount Goderich, Prime Minister and First Lord of the Treasury 1827–1828 Escutcheon: Vert a Chevron between three Stags at gaze Or Coronet: that of a Viscount Crest: Out of a Coronet composed of Fleurs-de-lis a Mount Vert thereon a Stag at gaze Or Supporters: On either side a Greyhound reguardant Sable Motto: Qualis ab incepto (As it was in the beginning)	
	Arms of Arthur Wellesley, 1st Duke of Wellington, Prime Minister and First Lord of the Treasury 1828–1830 and 1834 Main article: List of titles and honours of Arthur Wellesley, 1st Duke of Wellington § Arms Escutcheon: Quarterly, 1st and 4th, Gules a Cross Argent in each quarter five Plates in saltire (Wellesley); 2nd and 3rd, Or a Lion rampant Gules ducally-collared also Or (Cowley); over all in centre chief point an Inescutcheon charged with the Union Badge Coronet: that of a Duke Crest: Out of a ducal coronet Or a Demi-lion rampant Gules holding in the paws a forked Pennon Argent flowing to the sinister charged with the Cross of St George the ends Gules Supporters: On either side a Lion Gules gorged with an Eastern Coronet and chained Or Motto: Virtutis fortuna comes (Fortune favours the brave)	
	Arms of Charles Grey, 2nd Earl Grey, Prime Minister and First Lord of the Treasury 1830–1834 Escutcheon: Gules a Lion rampant within a Bordure engrailed Argent in dexter chief point a Mullet Or Coronet: that of an Earl Crest: A Scaling Ladder Or hooked and pointed Sable Supporters: On the dexter side a Lion guardant Purpure ducally-crowned Or and on the sinister side a Tiger guardant Proper Motto: De bon vouloir servir le Roy (To serve the King with good will)	
	Arms of William Lamb, 2nd Viscount Melbourne, Prime Minister and First Lord of the Treasury 1834 and 1835–1841 Escutcheon: Sable on a Fess Erminois between three Cinquefoils Argent two Mullets of the Field Coronet: that of a Viscount Crest: A Demi-lion rampant Gules holding between the paws a Mullet Sable Supporters: On either side a Lion Gules gorged with a Collar Or charged with two Mullets Sable and chained also Or Motto: Virtute et fide (By valour and Faith)	
	Arms of Robert Peel, Prime Minister and First Lord of the Treasury 1834–1835 and 1841–1846 Escutcheon: Argent three Sheaves of as many Arrows Proper banded Gules on a Chief Azure a Bee volant Or, with the mark of a baronet for difference Crest: A Demi-lion rampant Argent gorged with a Collar Azure charged with three Bezants holding between the paws a Shuttle Or Motto: Industria Honours: Baronet	
	Arms of John Russell, 1st Earl Russell, Prime Minister and First Lord of the Treasury 1846–1852 and 1865–1866 Escutcheon: Argent a Lion Rampant Gules on a chief Sable three escallops of the field over the centre escallop a mullet Argent Coronet: that of an Earl Crest: A Goat statant Argent armed and unguled Or Supporters: On the dexter side a Lion Gules and on the sinister side an Heraldic Antelope also Gules armed unguled tufted ducally gorged and chained the Chain reflexed over the back Or each supporter charged on the shoulder with a Mullet Argent Motto: Che sera sera (What will be, will be)	
	Arms of Edward Smith-Stanley, 14th Earl of Derby, Prime Minister and First Lord of the Treasury 1852, 1858–1859 and 1866–1868 Escutcheon: Argent on a Bend Azure three Bucks' Heads cabossed Or Coronet: that of an Earl Crest: On a Chapeau Gules turned up Ermine an Eagle with wings extended Or preying on a Child Proper swaddled Gules in a Cradle laced Or Supporters: On the dexter side a Griffin with wings elevated Or ducally collared and line reflexed over the back Azure and on the dexter side a Stag Or also ducally collared and line reflexed over the back Azure Motto: Sans changer (Unchanging)	
	Arms of George Hamilton-Gordon, 4th Earl of Aberdeen, Prime Minister and First Lord of the Treasury 1852–1855 Escutcheon: Azure three Boars' Heads couped Or within a double tressure flowered and counterflowered alternately with thistles, roses and fleurs-de-lis Or Coronet: that of an Earl Crest: Two naked Arms from the shoulder holding a Bow ready to let fly an Arrow Proper Supporters: on the dexter side an Earl in his robes Proper and on the sinister side a Doctor of Laws also robed Proper Motto: Fortuna sequatur (Let fortune follow)	
	Arms of Henry John Temple, 3rd Viscount Palmerston, Prime Minister and First Lord of the Treasury 1855–1858 and 1859–1865 Escutcheon: Quarterly, 1st and 4th, Or an Eagle displayed Sable (Earl of Mercia); 2nd and 3rd, Argent two bars Sable each charged with three Martlets Or (Temple) Coronet: that of a Viscount Crest: A Talbot sejant Sable, plain collared Or Supporters: Dexter a Lion regardant Pean; Sinister a Horse regardant Argent maned tailed and hoofed Or. Motto: Flecti non frangi (Flexible but unbreakable)	
	Arms of Benjamin Disraeli, 1st and last Earl of Beaconsfield, Prime Minister and First Lord of the Treasury 1868 and 1874–1880 Escutcheon: Per saltire Gules and Argent a castle triple-towered in chief Argent two lions rampant in fess Sable and an eagle displayed in base Or. Coronet: that of an Earl Crest: Issuant from a wreath of oak Proper a castle triple-towered Argent. Supporters: Dexter an eagle Or sinister a lion Or each gorged with a collar Gules and pendent therefrom an escutcheon of the last charged with a tower Argent. Motto: Forti Nihil Fifficile (Power Overcomes Difficulty)	
	Arms of William Ewart Gladstone, Prime Minister and First Lord of the Treasury 1868–1874, 1880–1885, 1886 and 1892–1894 Escutcheon: Argent a savage's head affronté gutté de sang wreathed about the temples with holly proper within an orle flory gules all within an orle of martlets sable Crest: issuant from a wreath of holly vert, a demi-griffin sable, supporting between the claws a sword, the blade enfiled by a bonnet of holly and bay also vert Motto: Fide et virtute (By Faith and valour)	
	Arms of Robert Gascoyne-Cecil, 3rd Marquess of Salisbury, Prime Minister and First Lord of the Treasury 1885–1886, 1886–1892 and 1895–1902 Escutcheon: Quarterly, 1st and 4th, Barry of ten Argent and Azure over all six Escutcheons Sable three two and one each charged with a Lion rampant of the First a Crescent for difference (Cecil); 2nd and 3rd, Argent on a Pale Sable a Conger's Head erased and erect Or charged with an Ermine Spot (Gascoyne) Coronet: that of a Marquess Crests: 1st, Six Arrows in saltire Or barbed and flighted Argent bound together with a Belt Gules buckled and garnished Or over the Arrows a Morion Cap Proper (Cecil); 2nd, a Conger's Head erased and erect Or charged with an Ermine Spot (Gascoyne) Supporters: On either side a Lion Ermine Motto: Seo sed serio (Late but with sincerity)	
	Arms of Archibald Primrose, 5th Earl of Rosebery, Prime Minister and First Lord of the Treasury 1894–1895 Escutcheon: Quarterly, 1st and 4th, Vert three Primroses within a Double Tressure flory counterflory Or (Primrose); 2nd and 3rd, Argent a Lion rampant double-queued Sable (Cressy) Coronet: that of an Earl Crest: A Demi-lion Gules holding in the dexter paw a Primrose Or Supporters: On either side a Lion Or Motto: Fide et fiducia (By Faith and trust)	

=== 20th century ===
Escutcheon	Name of prime minister (including peerage title, if any) and heraldic blazon	Full achievement
	Arms of Arthur Balfour, 1st Earl of Balfour, Prime Minister and First Lord of the Treasury 1902–1905 Escutcheon: Argent on a Chevron engrailed between three Mullets Sable as many Otters' Heads erased of the First Coronet: that of an Earl Crest: A Palm Tree Proper Supporters: On either side an Otter Proper collared Or Motto: Virtus ad Æthera tendit (Virtue strives towards Heaven)	
	Arms of Henry Campbell-Bannerman, Prime Minister and First Lord of the Treasury 1905–1908 Escutcheon: Quarterly, 1st and 4th, per pale Gules and Sable a Banner displayed bendways Argent thereon a Canton Azure charged with a Saltire of the Third (Bannerman); 2nd and 3rd, Gyronny of eight Or and Sable on a Chief engrailed Argent a Galley her oars in action between two Hunting Horns stringed all of the Second (Campbell of Belmont) Crests: 1st, A Demi-man in armour Proper (Bannerman); 2nd, a Boar's Head erased Proper (Campbell) Mottos: (Above the first crest) Patriæ fidelis; (Above the second crest) Ne obliviscaris Honours: Knight Grand Cross of the Order of the Bath (represented by the Bath circlet in Campbell-Bannerman's full armorial achievement) Kinsmen: Duke of Argyll, Campbell baronets and David Campbell-Bannerman MEP	
	Arms of H. H. Asquith, 1st Earl of Oxford & Asquith, Prime Minister and First Lord of the Treasury 1908–1916 Escutcheon: Sable on a Fess between three Cross-crosslets Argent a Portcullis of the Field Coronet: that of an Earl Crest: Issuant out of Clouds Proper a Mascle Gules Supporters: On either side a Lion Purpure charged on the shoulder with an open Book Argent edged Or Motto: Sine macula macla (Immaculate)	
	Arms of David Lloyd George, 1st Earl Lloyd-George of Dwyfor, Prime Minister and First Lord of the Treasury 1916–1922 Escutcheon: Azure over Water barry wavy in base a Bridge of one Arch Proper on a Chief Argent a Portcullis Sable between two Daffodils stalked and leaved also Proper Coronet: that of an Earl Crest: A Demi-dragon Gules holding between the claws a Portcullis Sable Supporters: on the dexter side a Dragon Or and on the sinister side an Eagle wings addorsed Or each gorged with a Collar Vert Motto: Y gwir yn erbyn y byd (Truth against the World)	
	Bonar Law, Prime Minister and First Lord of the Treasury 1922–1923 No arms	
	Arms of Stanley Baldwin, 1st Earl Baldwin of Bewdley, Prime Minister and First Lord of the Treasury 1923–1924, 1924–1929 and 1935–1937 Main article: List of honours of Stanley Baldwin § Coat of arms Escutcheon: Argent on a Saltire Sable a Quatrefoil Or Coronet: that of an Earl Crest: A Cockatrice sejant wings addorsed Argent combed wattled and beaked Or gorged with a Crown Vallary lined and reflexed over the back also Or and charged on the shoulder with a Rose Gules barbed and seeded Proper Supporters: On either side a White Owl Proper that on the sinister holding in the Beak a Sprig of Broom also Proper Motto: Per Deum meum transilio murum (By God I can scale any wall)	
	Ramsay MacDonald, Prime Minister and First Lord of the Treasury, 1924 and 1929–1935 No arms	
	Neville Chamberlain, Prime Minister and First Lord of the Treasury 1937–1940. Shield: Gules, a key in bend between two lions rampant or. Crest: On a wreath of the colours, issuing from the battlements of a tower a demi-lion proper, holding between the paws a key erect or. Motto: “Je tiens ferme.” (I hold fast) (The 1899 edition of Fox-Davies's Armorial families gives the Chamberlains' arms as Gules, eight cinquefoils in orle or but says that "no authority has been established" for these arms." The arms described above were officially granted.)	
	Arms of Winston Churchill, Prime Minister and First Lord of the Treasury 1940–1945 and 1951–1955 Main article: Honours of Winston Churchill § Coat of arms Escutcheon: Quarterly, 1st and 4th, Sable a Lion rampant Argent on a Canton of the Second a Cross Gules (Churchill); 2nd and 3rd, Quarterly Argent and Gules a Fret Or on a Bend Sable three Escallops of the First (Spencer); over all in centre chief point an Inescutcheon by augmentation of honour, Argent charged with the Cross of St George surmounted by another Escutcheon Azure charged with three Fleurs-de-lis two and one Or Crests: 1st, a Lion couchant guardant Argent supporting a Banner Gules charged with a Dexter Hand couped Argent (Churchill); 2nd, out of a ducal coronet Or a Griffin's Head between two Wings expanded Argent gorged with a Collar gemelle and armed Gules (Spencer) Honours: Order of the Garter, Order of Merit and Order of the Companions of Honour Motto: Fiel pero desdichado (Faithful though disinherited) (Sir Winston's arms are those of Spencer-Churchill without supporters unlike those of his grandfather, the 7th Duke of Marlborough KG.)	
	Arms of Clement Attlee, 1st Earl Attlee Prime Minister and First Lord of the Treasury 1945–1951 Main article: List of honours of Clement Attlee § Coat of arms Escutcheon: Azure on a Chevron Or between three Hearts of the Last winged Argent as many Lions rampant Sable Coronet: that of an Earl Crest: On a Mount Vert two Lions addorsed Or Supporters: On either side a Welsh Terrier sejant Proper Motto: Labor vincit omnia (Labour conquers all)	
	Arms of Anthony Eden, 1st Earl of Avon, Prime Minister and First Lord of the Treasury, 1955–1957 Escutcheon: Gules on a Chevron Argent between three Garbs Or banded Vert as many Escallops Sable Coronet: that of an Earl Supporters: On the dexter side a Leopard guardant Or resting the sinister hind paw on a Garb Or banded Vert and on the sinister side a like Leopard resting the dexter hind paw on a similar Garb Crest: A Dexter Arm in armour embowed couped at the shoulder Proper the hand grasping a Garb also Proper Motto: Si sit prudentia (If there be but prudence)	
	Arms of Harold Macmillan, 1st Earl of Stockton, Prime Minister and First Lord of the Treasury, 1957–1963 Escutcheon: Argent a Chief Or overall between three Open Books Proper edged Or and bound Azure those in chief inscribed respectively in Letters Sable "Miseres" and "Discere" and that in base also in Letters Sable inscribed "Succo" and as many Mullets Azure a Lion rampant Sable Coronet: that of an Earl Crest: Within Sprigs of Oak fructed Or a dexter Cubit Arm and a sinister Arm embowed both Proper the dexter hand gauntleted Or and with the other brandishing a Two-handed Sword Proper Hilt Pommel and Quillons Sable Supporters: On the dexter side a Lion rampant Gules and on the sinister side an American Bald-headed Eagle Proper both standing upon a Compartment comprising a crenelated Wall Proper in the portal thereof an Anchor Azure and jointed on either side by two Bars wavy Azure to a Grassy Mount growing from that on the dexter a Long Branch and from that on the sinister a Thistle both Proper	
	Arms of Alec Douglas-Home, Baron Home of the Hirsel, Prime Minister and First Lord of the Treasury, 1963–1964 Escutcheon: Quarterly, 1st and 4th grandquarterly, 1st and 4th, Vert a Lion rampant Argent armed and langued Gules (Home); 2nd and 3rd, Argent three Popinjays Vert beaked and membered Gules (Pepdie of Dunglas); over all an Inescutcheon Or charged with an Orle Azure (Landale); 2nd and 3rd grandquarterly, 1st, Azure a Lion rampant Argent armed and langued Gules crowned with an Imperial Crown Or (Lordship of Galloway); 2nd, Or a Lion rampant Gules armed and langued Azure debruised of a Ribbon Sable (Abernethy); 3rd, Argent three Piles Gules (Lordship of Brechin); 4th, Or a Fess chequy Azure and Argent surmounted of a Bend Sable charged with three Buckles of the Field (Stewart of Bonkill); over all on an Inescutcheon Argent a Man's Heart Gules ensigned with an Imperial Crown Proper and a Chief Azure charged with three Mullets of the Field (Douglas) Coronet: that of an Earl Crests: 1st, On a Cap of Maintenance Proper a Lion's Head erased Argent (Home); 2nd, On a Cap of Maintenance Proper a Salamander Vert encircled with Flames of Fire Proper (Douglas) Supporters: On either side a Lion Argent armed and langued Azure Mottos: (Above the first crest) A Home, a Home, a Home; (Above the second crest) Jamais arrière (Never behind); (Below the arms) True to the end Honours: Order of the Thistle	
	Arms of Harold Wilson, Baron Wilson of Rievaulx, Prime Minister and First Lord of the Treasury, 1964–1970 and 1974–1976 Escutcheon: Argent an Ancient Ship Proper on a Chief Gules a Stag's Head caboshed Or between two Water Bougets Argent Coronet: that of a Baron Crest: Upon a Rock a Lighthouse in front thereof a Spade blade downwards and a Quill point downwards in saltire all Proper Supporters: on the dexter side a Winged Lion Purpure charged on the Wing with three Roses Argent barbed and seeded Proper and on the sinister side a Griffin Or charged on the Wing with three Roses Gules barbed and seeded Proper Motto: Tempus rerum semperatur (It is what it is) Honours: Order of the Garter	
	Arms of Edward Heath, Prime Minister and First Lord of the Treasury, 1970–1974 Escutcheon: Per bend Purpure and Vert a Bend dancetty Or issuant from the sinister chief a Sunburst and in base a Portcullis chained Or Crest: Standing on a Naval Coronet Or a Swan Proper its dexter foot resting on a Cup Or Supporters: on the dexter side a Sea-lion Or charged on dexter shoulder with an Inescutcheon voided Vert and on the sinister side a Horse Argent gorged about the throat with a ducal coronet Vert Motto: Plus fait douceur, que violence (Better to make peace, not war) Honours: Order of the Garter, Order of the British Empire	
	Arms of James Callaghan, Baron Callaghan of Cardiff, Prime Minister and First Lord of the Treasury, 1976–1979 Escutcheon: Quarterly Vert and Azure in the former a Portcullis Or in the latter a Lymphad with an Anchor at its prow and masted Or the Sail set Argent and Pennants flying Gules overall a Fess Or to the sinister thereof a Grassy Mount with a Hurst of Oak Trees and issuing therefrom passant to the dexter a Wolf Proper Coronet: that of a Baron Crest: A Seadragon sejant Gules langued and scaled Or its Tail of the last and scaled Gules the Dorsal Fin also Gules about the neck a Mural Crown Or masoned Gules and supporting to the front with the Fin of the dexter foreleg a Portcullis also Or Motto: Malo laborare quam languere (I prefer to work than be idle) Honours: Order of the Garter	
	Arms of Margaret Thatcher, Baroness Thatcher, Prime Minister and First Lord of the Treasury, 1979–1990 Main article: Honours of Margaret Thatcher § Coat of arms Lozenge: Per chevron Azure and Gules in chief two Lions rampant guardant the dexter contourny supporting between them a double-warded Key wards upward and in base a Tower Or its Portal Sable therein a Portcullis of the Third Coronet: that of a Baroness Supporters: on the dexter side on a Mount of Tussocks of Grass Proper a Male Figure representing an Admiral of the Fleet on active service holding in his exterior hand a Pair of Binoculars all Proper and on the sinister side on a Grassy Mount Vert a Male Figure representing Sir Isaac Newton holding in his exterior hand a Pair of Scales all Proper Other elements: Garter circlet and appended Order of Merit insignia Motto: Cherish freedom Banner: The banner of Margaret Thatcher's arms used as knight/dame of the Garter at St George's Chapel	
	Arms of John Major, Prime Minister and First Lord of the Treasury, 1990–1997 Main article: John Major § Arms Escutcheon: Chequy Vert and Azure over all a Portcullis Or in chief three Torteaux Gules Crest: A Demi-stag Gules attired and unguled Or langued Azure holding between its forelegs a double-warded Key Or wards ’M’ upwards and ribboned Gules Azure and Argent Supporters: On either side a Cricket standing upon a Parliamentary Despatch Box Proper Other elements: The Garter circlet surrounding the Shield and suspended below the Badge of a Member of the Order of the Companions of Honour. Motto: Adeste comites (Rally round, comrades) Banner: The banner of John Major's arms used as knight of the Garter at St George's Chapel	
	Arms of Tony Blair, Prime Minister and First Lord of the Treasury, 1997–2007 Main article: Tony Blair § Honours Appointed a Knight Companion of the Garter in 2021, Sir Tony Blair's shield and banner are displayed at St George's Chapel, Windsor. The carving of the crest was sculpted by Ian G Brennan. The shield is depicted in the Dean of Windsor's tables. Escutcheon: Quarterly Gules and Azure, a Cross Or between four Bees volant Or. (He did not choose to ask for a version of the Clan Blair arms.) Crest: A mute Swan's head erased Proper holding in the beak a Rose Gules seeded Or barbed leaved and slipped Vert. Torse Azure, Or and Gules Honours: Garter circlet surrounding the shield Banner: The banner of Tony Blair's arms used as knight of the Garter at St George's Chapel	

=== 21st century ===
Escutcheon	Name of prime minister (including peerage title, if any) and heraldic blazon	Full achievement
	Gordon Brown, Prime Minister and First Lord of the Treasury, 2007–2010 No arms known.	
	Arms of David Cameron, Baron Cameron of Chipping Norton, Prime Minister and First Lord of the Treasury, 2010–2016 Cameron's great-great-grandfather, Sir Ewen Cameron, was granted arms by the Lord Lyon in 1905: Cameron has matriculated a version of these arms. Since his mother is an heraldic heiress, he is also entitled to quarter the arms of Mount: Escutcheon (paternal arms, undifferenced): Gules three Bars Or and in chief four Bezants Coronet: that of a Baron Crest: A Hand grasping a Sprig of Crowberries Proper Motto: Bi Dhichioll (By best endeavours)	
	Arms de jure matrimonii of Theresa May, Baroness May of Maidenhead, Prime Minister and First Lord of the Treasury, 2016–2019 Entitled to bear the arms of her husband, Sir Philip May. It is yet to be seen whether Lady May will apply for a grant of her own coat of arms from the College of Arms. Her arms correctly displayed would be on a lozenge rather than a shield (See Margaret (Baroness) Thatcher above). Coronet: that of a Baroness Escutcheon: Per fess Vert and Or three Pallets between four Roundels in bend counter changed. Motto: To thyself be true	
	Boris Johnson, Prime Minister and First Lord of the Treasury, 2019–2022 No arms known	
	Liz Truss, Prime Minister and First Lord of the Treasury, 2022 No arms known.	
	Rishi Sunak, Prime Minister and First Lord of the Treasury, 2022–2024 No arms known	
	Keir Starmer, Prime Minister and First Lord of the Treasury, 2024–2026 No arms known	
	Andy Burnham, Prime Minister and First Lord of the Treasury, 2026–present No arms known	

== See also ==
- Armorial of Lords of Appeal
- Armorial of Lord High Chancellors of Great Britain
- Armorial of the speakers of the British House of Commons
- Armorial of the governors-general of Australia
- Armorial of the governors general of Canada
- Armorial of the governors-general of New Zealand
- Armorial of presidents of the United States
