= Armorial of Lords of Appeal =

Lords of Appeal, informally called Law Lords, were members of the Appellate Committee of the House of Lords. The Appellate Jurisdiction Act 1876 allowed life peers to be appointed to the upper house for the specific purpose of serving on the committee, and they were called Lords of Appeal in Ordinary. The committee was reconstituted as the Supreme Court of the United Kingdom and many incumbent law lords were co-opted. Later-appointed justices have Lord or Lady as a courtesy title.

The coats of arms of many law lords, along with those of other senior judicial officeholders, are displayed on the walls and windows of Lincoln's Inn. They are also recorded in various editions of Debrett's House of Commons and the Judicial Bench.

== Law Lords appointed by Queen Victoria (1876-1900) ==
Arms	Name of Lord (including peerage title, if any) and heraldic blazon
	Colin Blackburn, Baron Blackburn, Lord of Appeal in Ordinary 1876-1887 Escutcheon: Argent on a pale Sable three stags' heads erased Argent. Crest: A stag's head erased as in the arms.
No arms known.	Edward Gordon, Baron Gordon of Drumearn, Lord of Appeal in Ordinary 1876-1879 No arms known
	William Watson, Baron Watson, Lord of Appeal in Ordinary 1880-1899 Escutcheon: Or an oak tree Proper growing out of a mount in base Vert surmounted of a fess Ermine charged with two mullets Azure. Crest: The stump of an oak tree with two branches sprouting from it and grasped on either side by a hand issuing from a cloud all Proper. Supporters: Dexter a highland deerhound Proper; sinister a lion Argent, each charged on the shoulder with a thistle slipped and leaved Proper. Motto: A Deo Floruit
	John FitzGerald, Baron FitzGerald, Lord of Appeal in Ordinary 1882-1889 Escutcheon: Ermine a mascle Or over all a saltire Gules.
	Edward Macnaghten, Baron Macnaghten, Lord of Appeal in Ordinary 1887-1910 Escutcheon: Quarterly 1st & 4th Argent a cubit arm issuing from the sinister proper the hand grasping a cross crosslet fitchy Azure 2nd & 3rd Argent a tower Gules all within a border Ermine an escutcheon of pretence Argent on a chief indented Azure three martlets Or. Crest: A tower Gules. Supporters: Two roebucks Proper each gorged with a double chain Or pendant therefrom an escutcheon Azure charged with two fasces in saltire Or. Motto: I Hope In God
	Michael Morris, Baron Morris (later Baron Killanin), Lord of Appeal in Ordinary 1889-1900 Escutcheon: Ermine a fess indented Sable in base a lion rampant of the last armed and langued Gules. Crest: On a fasces Proper a lion’s head erased Argent gutté de sang. Motto: Si Deus Nobiscum Quis Contra Nos
No arms known.	James Hannen, Baron Hannen, Lord of Appeal in Ordinary 1891-1893 No arms known.
No arms known.	Charles Bowen, Baron Bowen, Lord of Appeal in Ordinary 1893-1894 No arms known.
	Charles Russell, Baron Russell of Killowen, Lord of Appeal in Ordinary 1894 Escutcheon: Argent a lion rampant Gules on a chief Sable three escallops of the field the whole within a bordure engrailed Vert. Crest: A goat passant Argent armed Or charged on the body with three trefoils slipped fesswise Vert. Supporters: Dexter a goat Or semée of trefoils slipped Vert and gorged with a collar gemel Gules, sinister a Lion reguardant Or semée of escallops Gules and gorged with a like collar. Motto: Che Sera Sera (What Will Be Will Be)
	Horace Davey, Baron Davey, Lord of Appeal in Ordinary 1894-1907 Escutcheon: Ermine a chevron Sable between three mullets pierced Gules in the centre chief point a balance Or. Crest: A demi-lion Proper holding between the paws a mullet pierced Gules and supporting under the sinister paw a sword point downwards also Proper hilt and pommel Or. Supporters: On either side a lion gorged with a double chain Gold therefrom pendent a mullet pierced Gules each holding in the paw a sword erect also Proper hilt and pommel Or. Motto: J’Essayerai (What Will Be Will Be)
	James Robertson, Baron Robertson, Lord of Appeal in Ordinary 1899-1909 Escutcheon: Gules a fess Ermine between two wolves' heads erased in chief and a banner displayed in base Argent thereon a canton Azure charged with a saltire of the third. Crest: A dexter arm erect Proper charged with an Ermine spot the hand holding an Imperial crown also Proper. Supporters: On either side a wolf Argent charged on the shoulder with a thistle and standing on a fasces both Proper. Motto: Virtutis Gloria Merces (Glory Is The Recompense Of Valour)
	Nathaniel Lindley, Baron Lindley, Lord of Appeal in Ordinary 1900-1905 Escutcheon: Argent on a chief nebuly Azure a quatrefoil between two griffin’s heads erased Argent. Crest: In front of a pelican in her piety Argent vulning herself Proper and charged with a pheon point downwards Or three quatrefoils fesswise Or. Supporters: Dexter a Griffin wings elevated Argent standing on a fasces Proper, sinister a pelican wings elevated Argent vulning herself and standing on a fasces Proper. Motto: Sis Fortis (May You Be Brave)

== Law Lords appointed by King Edward VII (1905-1909) ==
Arms	Name of Lord (including peerage title, if any) and heraldic blazon
	John Atkinson, Baron Atkinson, Lord of Appeal in Ordinary 1905-1928 Escutcheon: Per pale Gules and Argent an eagle displayed with two heads counterchanged on a chief engrailed Ermine a rose proper between two martlets Or. Crest: A falcon rising proper belled and jessed Or holding in its beak a Fleur-de-lis per pale Gules and Argent. Supporters: Dexter a figure of Justice proper vested Argent semée of fleurs-de-lis Gules, sinister an eagle proper gorged with a collar flory counter flory and pendent therefrom a Portcullis Or.
No arms known.	Richard Collins, Baron Collins, Lord of Appeal in Ordinary 1907-1910 No arms known.
	Thomas Shaw, Baron Shaw (later Baron Craigmyle), Lord of Appeal in Ordinary 1909-1929 Escutcheon: Ermine a fir tree growing out of a mount in base Proper between two piles Azure issuing from a chief Gules charged with a scroll Argent with seal pendant Proper. Crest: A demi-savage holding in his dexter hand a club resting on his shoulder Proper. Motto: Misericordia Fidelitas Jus (Mercy Fidelity Right)

== Law Lords appointed by King George V (1910-1935) ==
Arms	Name of Lord (including peerage title, if any) and heraldic blazon
	William Robson, Baron Robson, Lord of Appeal in Ordinary 1910-1912 Blazon not available. Tinctures unknown. Motto: Fac Et Spera
	John Fletcher Moulton, Baron Moulton, Lord of Appeal in Ordinary 1912-1921 Escutcheon: Gules four bars per pale Argent and Or two flaunches of the third each charged with a sun of the field. Crest: Upon a mount a lamb statant Proper holding in the mouth a trefoil slipped Vert the whole between four ears of wheat stalked and leaved two on either side also Proper.
	Robert Parker, Baron Parker of Waddington, Lord of Appeal in Ordinary 1913-1918 Blazon not available.
	John Hamilton, Baron Sumner (later Viscount Sumner), Lord of Appeal in Ordinary 1913-1930 Escutcheon: Ermine a chevron interlaced with another reversed between three cinquefoils Gules. Crest: A deer hound's head couped at the neck Argent charged with two chevrons as in the arms. Motto: Loi Et Loyaute
	Andrew Murray, 1st Baron Dunedin (later Viscount Dunedin), Lord of Appeal 1913-1932 Motto: Macte Virtute
	George Cave, 1st Viscount Cave, Lord of Appeal 1918-1922 Escutcheon: Or fretty Azure a cross moline within a bordure nebuly Gules on a chief of the last two greyhounds' heads erased of the first. Crest: A greyhound sejant Or pellettée, resting the dexter leg on a cross moline Gules. Motto: Cave Deus Videt (Beware God Sees)
	Edward Carson, Baron Carson, Lord of Appeal in Ordinary 1921-1929 Crest: An elephant statant supporting with the trunk a fasces Or. Escutcheon: Argent on a chevron couped Gules between three crescents Sable two fasces chevronwise Or. Motto: Dum Spiro Spero
	Robert Younger, Baron Blanesburgh, Lord of Appeal in Ordinary 1923-1937 Escutcheon: Per saltire Or and Gules a rose counterchanged in base a martlet Sable on a chief indented also Sable three covered cups Or. Crest: An armed leg couped at the thigh proper garnished and spurred Or. Supporters: Dexter the figure of St Blane, sinister an Ermine both Proper standing upon a mount set with thistles. Motto: Celer Et Audax (Quick And Bold)
No arms known.	James Atkin, Baron Atkin, Lord of Appeal in Ordinary 1928-1944 No arms known.
	Thomas Tomlin, Baron Tomlin, Lord of Appeal in Ordinary 1929-1935 Escutcheon: Argent on a fess between three battle axes Sable three dexter hands Proper. Crest: In front of two battle axes in saltire Proper a hand as in the arms. Supporters: Two lions Purpure each charged with a fascis erect Or. Motto: Aidons Nous Mutuellement
	Frank Russell, Baron Russell of Killowen, Lord of Appeal in Ordinary 1929-1946 Escutcheon: Argent a lion rampant Gules on a chief Sable three escallops of the field the whole within a bordure engrailed Vert. Crest: A goat passant Argent armed Or charged on the body with three trefoils slipped fesswise Vert. Supporters: Dexter a goat Or semée of trefoils slipped Vert and gorged with a collar gemel Gules, sinister a Lion reguardant Or semée of escallops Gules and gorged with a like collar. Motto: Che Sera Sera (What Will Be Will Be)
No arms known.	William Watson, Baron Thankerton, Lord of Appeal in Ordinary 1929-1948 No arms known.
No arms known.	Hugh Macmillan, Baron Macmillan, Lord of Appeal in Ordinary 1930-1939 No arms known.
	Robert Wright, Baron Wright, Lord of Appeal in Ordinary 1932-1935 and 1937-1947 Escutcheon: Azure on a fess between three eagles' heads couped Or a pale between two fleurs-de-lis of the first the pale charged with a fleur-de-lis of the second. Crest: In front of a demi-dragon Or the wings semée of fleur-de-lis Azure a fasces fesswise Sable. Supporters: On either side a pegasus Argent the wings Or semée of fleurs-de-lis Azure. Motto: Mens Aequa
	Frederic Maugham, Baron Maugham (later Viscount Maugham), Lord of Appeal in Ordinary 1935-1938 and 1939-1941 Motto: In Finem Perseverans
	Adair Roche, Baron Roche, Lord of Appeal in Ordinary 1935-1938 No arms known.

No Lords of Appeal were appointed during Edward VIII's short reign.

== Law Lords appointed by King George VI (1938-1951) ==
Arms	Name of Lord (including peerage title, if any) and heraldic blazon
	Mark Romer, Baron Romer, Lord of Appeal in Ordinary 1938-1944 Escutcheon: Or on a base Vert a man in armour visor raised on the helmet Proper a plume Gules Argent and Azure holding in the dexter gauntlet a halbert Proper headed Or about the waist a sword belt Gules pendant therefrom a sword hilted Or the scabbard Gules garnished Or a crescent in dexter chief for difference Azure. Crest: Out of a ducal coronet Or a demi man in armour as in the arms. Motto: Agere Aut Pati Fortiter Romanum Est
	Gavin Simonds, Baron Simonds (later Viscount Simonds), Lord of Appeal in Ordinary 1944-1951 and 1954-1962 Escutcheon: Tierced in pall Azure Gules and Vert three trefoils slipped Or. Crest: An ermine Proper resting the sinister paw upon the astronomical sign of Taurus Sable and holding in the mouth a trefoil slipped Or. Supporters: On either side an ermine Proper each charged on the shoulder the dexter with an hop leaf and the sinister with a bezant. Motto: Simplex Munditiis
No arms known.	Rayner Goddard, Baron Goddard, Lord of Appeal in Ordinary 1944-1946 No arms known.
	Augustus Uthwatt, Baron Uthwatt, Lord of Appeal in Ordinary 1946-1949 Escutcheon: Argent on a bend cotised Sable three pierced mullets of the field. Crest: A stag's Head erased Argent. Motto: Lux In Tenebris
No arms known.	Herbert du Parcq, Baron du Parcq, Lord of Appeal in Ordinary 1946-1949 No arms known.
No arms known.	John MacDermott, Baron MacDermott, Lord of Appeal in Ordinary 1947-1951 No arms known.
No arms known.	Wilfrid Normand, Baron Normand, Lord of Appeal in Ordinary 1947-1953 No arms known.
	Geoffrey Lawrence, 1st Baron Oaksey (later Baron Trevethin), Lord of Appeal 1947-1957 Escutcheon: Per chevron Argent and Gules two crosses raguly in chief of the last and a lamb in base holding with the dexter foreleg a banner and staff all of the first the banner charged with a cross couped Azure. Crest: A dragon's head erased Sable between two bugle horns counter-embowed Or. Supporters: On either side a dragon Sable winged and charged on the shoulder with a fasces Or. Motto: Pur Fel Dur
	Fergus Morton, Baron Morton of Henryton, Lord of Appeal in Ordinary 1947-1959 Escutcheon: Argent on a chevron engrailed Azure between three roses Gules barbed and seeded proper as many mill-rinds Or. Crest: An eagle wings addorsed Sable gorged with a collar flory-counterflory and resting the dexter claw on a mill-rind Or. Motto: Mort On Se Reveille
No arms known.	James Reid, Baron Reid, Lord of Appeal in Ordinary 1948-1975 No arms known.
No arms known.	Wilfred Greene, 1st Baron Greene, Lord of Appeal 1949-1950 No arms known.
	Cyril Radcliffe, Baron Radcliffe (later Viscount Radcliffe), Lord of Appeal in Ordinary 1949-1964 Escutcheon: Ermine four bendlets engrailed Sable. Crest: Issuant from a tower Or a bull's head Ermines. Supporters: On either side a black labrador retriever Proper. Motto: Semper Fidelis (Always Faithful)
No arms known.	James Tucker, Baron Tucker, Lord of Appeal in Ordinary 1950-1961 No arms known.
	Cyril Asquith, Baron Asquith of Bishopstone, Lord of Appeal in Ordinary 1951-1954 Escutcheon: Sable on a fess between three crosses crosslet Argent a portcullis of the field. Crest: Issuant out of clouds Proper a mascle Gules. Motto: Sine Macula Macla (Spotless)
	Lionel Cohen, Baron Cohen, Lord of Appeal in Ordinary 1951-1960 Escutcheon: Argent on a chevron Gules cottised Azure between two roses of the second barbed and seeded Proper in chief and a buck's head couped also Proper in base three Annulets Or. Crest: A buck's head couped Argent armed Or gorged with a wreath of oak proper and charged with four barrulets Gules in the mouth a rose of the last slipped also Proper. Supporters: Dexter a pegasus Argent, sinister a lion Or each charged on the shoulder with hurt thereon a mill-rind Gold.

== Law Lords appointed by Queen Elizabeth II (1953-2009) ==
Alive

Arms	Name of Lord (including peerage title, if any) and heraldic blazon
No arms known.	James Keith, Baron Keith of Avonholm, Lord of Appeal in Ordinary 1953-1961 No arms known.
	Donald Somervell, Baron Somervell of Harrow, Lord of Appeal in Ordinary 1954-1960 Escutcheon: Azure three lozenges in fess Or each charged with a mullet of the field accompanied by seven cross crosslets of the second four in chief and three in base all within bordure Ermine for difference. Crest: A wheel Or upon it a dragon Vert spouting flames Proper. Supporters: On either side a wyvern Vert spouting flames Proper charged on the shoulder with a wheel Or.
	Tom Denning, Baron Denning, Lord of Appeal in Ordinary 1957-1962 Escutcheon: Per bend Or and Gules a fess wavy between two lions’ heads erased in chief and a lion’s head affronty in base all counterchanged. Crest: Out of a cap of maintenance Gules turned up Ermine a cubit arm vested and holding in the glove Argent a roll of parchment Proper. Supporters: Dexter Judge Mansfield in his wig sinister Judge Coke in his cap both gowned and holding in their exterior hands a roll of parchment Proper. Motto: Fiat Justitia
	David Jenkins, Baron Jenkins, Lord of Appeal in Ordinary 1959-1963 Escutcheon: Paly of six Gules and Ermine an orle of leeks Or. Crest: Issuant from a circlet of lotus flowers and leaves Proper a lion passant Or. Supporters: Dexter a wyvern Argent, sinister a dragon Gules. Motto: Non Sine Jure
No arms known.	John Morris, Baron Morris of Borth-y-Gest, Lord of Appeal in Ordinary 1960-1973 No arms known.
No arms known.	Charles Hodson, Baron Hodson, Lord of Appeal in Ordinary 1960-1971 No arms known.
No arms known.	Christopher Guest, Baron Guest, Lord of Appeal in Ordinary 1961-1971 No arms known.
No arms known.	Patrick Devlin, Baron Devlin, Lord of Appeal in Ordinary 1961-1964 No arms known.
	Edward Pearce, Baron Pearce, Lord of Appeal in Ordinary 1962-1969 Motto: Humani Nil Alienum
	Raymond Evershed, 1st Baron Evershed, Lord of Appeal 1962-1965 Motto: Sic Itur Ad Astra
	Gerald Upjohn, Baron Upjohn, Lord of Appeal in Ordinary 1963-1971 Escutcheon: Sable a fess between in chief two lion's heads erased and in base as many leeks in saltire Or. Crest: A stork Proper holding in the beak a balance Or. Motto: Quid Quid Agis Age Toto
	Terence Donovan, Baron Donovan, Lord of Appeal in Ordinary 1964-1971 Escutcheon: Quarterly Gules and Ermine an open book proper bound and edged Or. Crest: A grenade Sable fired proper winged Azure. Supporters: On a compartment on either side upon the stock of a tree sprouting a peregrine falcon rising Proper.
No arms known.	Richard Wilberforce, Baron Wilberforce, Lord of Appeal in Ordinary 1964-1982 No arms known.
No arms known.	Colin Pearson, Baron Pearson, Lord of Appeal in Ordinary 1965-1974 No arms known.
	Kenneth Diplock, Baron Diplock, Lord of Appeal in Ordinary 1968-1985 Escutcheon: Gules a quintain Argent garnished and with a crossbeam and targe double chained towards the base and padlocked Or a border Ermine. Crest: A demi horse Argent crined and unglued Or supporting a pair of keys interlaced at the bows wards downwards and outwards the dexter Argent the sinister Or. Supporters: On a compartment of ploughed land between pasture within a hedgerow interspersed with paling all Proper dexter a fox hound sinister a fox both Proper. Motto: Celeriter Ac Diligenter
	Reginald Manningham-Buller, 1st Viscount Dilhorne, Lord of Appeal 1969-1980 Escutcheon: Sable on a cross Argent quarter pierced of the field four eagles displayed of the first.
No arms known.	Geoffrey Cross, Baron Cross of Chelsea, Lord of Appeal in Ordinary 1971-1977 No arms known.
	Jocelyn Simon, Baron Simon of Glaisdale, Lord of Appeal in Ordinary 1971-1977 Escutcheon: Per saltire Sable and Ermine a pair of scales Or between in fess two roses Argent barbed and seeded Proper and in pale two crescents Ermine. Crest: A cock's head erased Azure combed and wattled Gules between two palm branches Vert holding in the beak two roses Argent clipped leaved barbed and seeded Proper. Supporters: Dexter a man habited in the robes of a Doctor of Civil Law in the University of Cambridge Proper and holding in his dexter hand a book Or, sinister a man habited in the robes of President of the Probate Divorce and Admiralty Division of the High Court Proper. Motto: Si Monent Tubae Paratus (If The Trumpets Sound Be Ready)
No arms known.	Charles Shaw, Baron Kilbrandon, Lord of Appeal in Ordinary 1971-1977 No arms known.
	Cyril Salmon, Baron Salmon, Lord of Appeal in Ordinary 1972-1980 Escutcheon: Per chevron Gules and Ermine in chief two horses forcene Argent in base a sword erect Gules pommel and hilt Or a chief Or.
Edmund Davies, Baron Edmund-Davies, Lord of Appeal in Ordinary 1974-1981 Escutcheon: Argent a tree eradicated proper fructed Gules a border nebuly Sable. Crest: A long bottomed wig Argent. Supporters: Dexter a dragon Gules, sinister a griffin Or both resting their inner feet on a Celtic cross Argent. Motto: Anelan Uchel
No arms known.	Ian Fraser, Baron Fraser of Tullybelton, Lord of Appeal in Ordinary 1975-1985 No arms known.
	Charles Ritchie Russell, Baron Russell of Killowen, Lord of Appeal in Ordinary 1975-1982 Escutcheon: Argent a lion rampant Gules on a chief Sable three escallops of the field the whole within a bordure engrailed Vert. Crest: A goat passant Argent armed Or charged on the body with three trefoils slipped fesswise Vert. Supporters: Dexter a goat Or semée of trefoils slipped Vert and gorged with a collar gemel Gules, sinister a Lion reguardant Or semée of escallops Gules and gorged with a like collar. Motto: Che Sera Sera (What Will Be Will Be)
No arms known.	Henry Keith, Baron Keith of Kinkel, Lord of Appeal in Ordinary 1977-1996 No arms known.
No arms known.	Leslie Scarman, Baron Scarman, Lord of Appeal in Ordinary 1977-1986 No arms known.
No arms known.	Geoffrey Lane, Baron Lane, Lord of Appeal in Ordinary 1979-1980 No arms known.
	Eustace Roskill, Baron Roskill, Lord of Appeal in Ordinary 1980-1986 Escutcheon: Gules a lion rampant quarterly Argent and Or in chief two green woodpeckers respectant Proper.
	Nigel Bridge, Baron Bridge of Harwich, Lord of Appeal in Ordinary 1980-1992 Escutcheon: Azure issuant from the centre of a bar wavy of water Proper in the nombril point of a bridge of three arches embattled Argent masoned Sable the whole between as many sealions naiant guardant and each crowned with a mural crown Gold. Crest: An eagle rising proper the beak Or holding therein a sprig of lilac also Proper. Supporters: Dexter a winged horse in trian aspect Argent hooved Or resting the dexter hoof upon a portcullis chained also Or, sinister a sealion in trian aspect all Argent resting the sinister forepaw on a portcullis chained Gold. Compartment: A grassy mount growing therefrom on a rose Gules barbed stalked and leaved proper another rose Argent barbed and seeded also Proper between on the dexter a rose Argent and on the sinister a rose Gules both barbed seeded stalked and leaved Proper on the sinister side of the mount a flat rock Proper. Motto: Me Juvat Ire Per Altem (I Rejoice In Treading The High Path)
No arms known.	Henry Brandon, Baron Brandon of Oakbrook, Lord of Appeal in Ordinary 1981-1991 No arms known.
	John Brightman, Baron Brightman, Lord of Appeal in Ordinary 1982-1986 Escutcheon: Per fess wavy Azure and Argent in chief two dolphins naiant Or and in base the stern of a man of war of circa 1805 Proper. Crest: A herring gull statant wings elevated and addorsed Proper supporting with the dexter foot a rose Gules barbed and seeded Proper. Supporters: Two otters each on a grassy mount encircled by water proper and collared with a crown rayonny Gold. Motto: Steer A True Course
	Sydney Templeman, Baron Templeman, Lord of Appeal in Ordinary 1982-1994 Escutcheon: Per pale Azure and Gules a fess raguly between a lion passant in chief and in base a fleur-de-lys bourgeonny Gold. Crest: An eagle Or beaked and legged and wings displayed Gules gorged with a coronet its finials of roses also Gules and supporting by the dexter claw a kukri erect with the point of the blade outwards Proper. Supporters: Dexter a cock pheasant sinister a hen pheasant both guardant and in the beak of each a grain of wheat Proper.
No arms known.	Hugh Griffiths, Baron Griffiths, Lord of Appeal in Ordinary 1985-1993 No arms known.
	James Mackay, Baron Mackay of Clashfern†, Lord of Appeal 1985-1987 Escutcheon: Azure on a chevron Argent between two bears' heads couped Argent muzzled Gules in chief and a fleece Argent in base a roebuck's head erased between two hands grasping daggers the points turned towards the buck's head all Proper. Crest: A dexter arm couped at the elbow Proper the hand grasping a pair of balances Or. Supporters: Dexter a male figure attired in the robes of the Lord High Chancellor, sinister a male figure attired in the Robes of one of Her Majesty's Counsel learned in the Law in Scotland Proper. Motto: Manu Justi (With The Hand Of A Just Man)
	Desmond Ackner, Baron Ackner, Lord of Appeal in Ordinary 1986-1993 Escutcheon: Sable in fess issuant from a barrulet wavy Azure fimbriated Argent a representation of the bridge of Clare College Cambridge Proper the whole between two whales spouting naiant counter naiant Gold. Crest: Upon a helm with a wreath Or and Sable a short-eared owl Proper crowned Or supporting with the dexter claw a clarion Azure. Supporters: Two otters each holding in the mouth a trout Gold the compartment comprising a river bank with bulrushes growing therefrom Proper. Motto: Non Servimus Justitiae Silendo
	Robert Goff, Baron Goff of Chieveley, Lord of Appeal in Ordinary 1986-1998 Escutcheon: Azure a chevron between in chief two fleur-de-lis and in base a lion rampant Or. Crest: A squirrel sejant Proper. Motto: Fier Sans Tache
	Peter Oliver, Baron Oliver of Aylmerton, Lord of Appeal in Ordinary 1986-1992 Escutcheon: Per chevron Gules and Vert in chief two crosses moline Or and in base a chaplet of olive also Or a bordure Ermine. Crest: Within a crown pallisado Or a grassy mount thereon a representation of the tower of the Church of St John the Baptist at Aylmerton Proper issuing therefrom a cubit arm Proper holding a crescent Ermine. Supporters: Dexter a lion Purpure the dexter paw in a mail gauntlet Argent, sinister an American bald-headed eagle holding in the dexter claw a quill pen all Proper. Motto: Trwy Weithred Y Dysgir
	Charles Jauncey, Baron Jauncey of Tullichettle, Lord of Appeal in Ordinary 1988-1996 Escutcheon: Or three chevronels engrailed Gules in chief two lions rampant and respectant of the second. Crest: An arm embowed in armour Argent holding in the gauntlet Or a battle-axe in fess also Argent the forearm environed of a wreath of laurel Vert. Supporters: Dexter a lion Gules gorged of a collar Or charged with a chevronel engrailed Gules, sinister a buck Proper attired collared and chained Or the collar charged with a chevronel engrailed Gules. Motto: Virtute Majorum
No arms known.	Robert Lowry, Baron Lowry†, Lord of Appeal 1988-1994 No arms known.
No arms known.	Nick Browne-Wilkinson, Baron Browne-Wilkinson, Lord of Appeal in Ordinary 1991-2000 No arms known.
No arms known.	Michael Mustill, Baron Mustill, Lord of Appeal in Ordinary 1992-1997 No arms known.
	Gordon Slynn, Baron Slynn of Hadley, Lord of Appeal in Ordinary 1992-2002 Escutcheon: Argent on a chevron Gules between three leopards' heads proper as many garbs Or. On a chief Azure three saltires couped Argent. Crest: Within a crest coronet Or a tawny owl holding in the dexter claw a quill erect Proper the leg ringed Or. Motto: Conari Intellegere
	Harry Woolf, Baron Woolf, Lord of Appeal in Ordinary 1992-1996 Escutcheon: Per pale Sable and Argent per fess indented of two points downwards counter¬changed three harps the pillar of each terminating in the head neck and wings of a Pegasus in the Sable Or in the Argent Sable. Crest: Upon a helm with a wreath Argent and Sable a wolf sejant erect Sable gorged with a plain collar attached thereto a chain reflexed over the back Or and grasping in the dexter forepaw a sword erect Argent hilt pommel and quillons Or. Supporters: On the dexter a wolf Or gorged with a plain collar attached thereto a chain reflexed over the back Sable and grasping in the interior forepaw a sword bendwise Argent hilt pommel and quillons Sable on the sinister a wolf Sable gorged with a plain collar attached thereto a chain reflexed over the back Or and grasping in the interior forepaw a sword bendwise sinister Argent hilt pommel and quillons Or. Motto: For Family And Justice
	Tony Lloyd, Baron Lloyd of Berwick, Lord of Appeal in Ordinary 1993-1998 Escutcheon: Per fess Gules and Or a pale per fess and a fess per fess in chief an escallop between two hedgehogs and in base a hedgehog between two escallops all counter-changed. Crest: A hedgehog Gules spined Or holding in the dexter paw an ostrich plume erect Proper. Motto: Nisi Dominus (Only The Lord)
	Michael Nolan, Baron Nolan, Lord of Appeal in Ordinary 1994-1998 Escutcheon: Gules between six Ermine spots Or two bars wavy couped composed of two troughs and a wave invected of one point on the upper edge and engrailed of one point on the lower edge Argent in chief a like bar also Argent. Crest: A lamb statant guardant Argent nimbed and unguled Or supporting with the sinister forefoot over the shoulder a celtic long cross Gules. Supporters: On either side a llama Argent charged with a fess Gules.
	Donald Nicholls, Baron Nicholls of Birkenhead, Lord of Appeal in Ordinary 1994-2007 Escutcheon: Sable two bars each between two cotises set on the outer edge with birch leaves Or. Crest: A demi-mole Sable holding between the paws a daffodil slipped and leaved Or. Supporters: On either side a cormorant wings displayed and inverted Sable beaked and legged Or. Motto: Let Equity Prevail
No arms known.	Johan Steyn, Baron Steyn, Lord of Appeal in Ordinary 1995-2005 No arms known.
No arms known.	Leonard Hoffmann, Baron Hoffmann, Lord of Appeal in Ordinary 1995-2009 No arms known.
	David Hope, Baron Hope of Craighead†, Lord of Appeal 1996-2009 and Justice of the Supreme Court 2009-2013 Escutcheon: Azure on a chevron Or between three bezants a bay leaf between two quill pens Vert. Crest: A broken terrestrial sphere Proper charged with an anchor Gules surrounded by a rainbow Proper. Motto: Spes Non Est Fracta (My Hope is Not Broken)
	James Clyde, Baron Clyde, Lord of Appeal in Ordinary 1996-2009 Escutcheon: Per fess Argent and Azure a fess wavy per fess wavy Azure and Argent two bushes upon mounds Vert in chief and a tower Or window and port Gules in base. Crest: Issuant from a mount Vert a tree with three branches one of mountain ash one of beech and one of cherry Proper. Supporter: Dexter the figure of Justice without blindfold and holding in her exterior hand a pair of scales all Proper, sinister the figure of Apollo holding in his exterior hand a lyre all Proper. Motto: Diligens Integer Laetus (Hard-Working Honourable Happy)
No arms known.	Brian Hutton, Baron Hutton, Lord of Appeal in Ordinary 1997-2004 No arms known.
No arms known.	Mark Saville, Baron Saville of Newdigate, Lord of Appeal in Ordinary 1997-2009 and Justice of the Supreme Court 2009-2010 No arms known.
No arms known.	John Hobhouse, Baron Hobhouse of Woodborough, Lord of Appeal in Ordinary 1998-2004 No arms known.
	Peter Millett, Baron Millett, Lord of Appeal in Ordinary 1998-2004 Escutcheon: Per pale Sable and Argent a crescent per pale Ermine and Ermines interlaced with two arrows in saltire heads downwards per pale Argent and Sable within eight billets in orle counterchanged. Crest: On a millrind fesswise an eagle displayed Sable armed and legged Gules and breathing flames Proper. Motto: The Greek for, ‘Know Thyself.’.
	Nicholas Phillips, Baron Phillips of Worth Matravers, Lord of Appeal in Ordinary 1999-2000 and 2008-2009, Justice of the Supreme Court 2009-2012 Escutcheon: Azure a fess Ermine between three ammonites Argent ribbed Sable. Crest: On a rock of fossil limestone Proper a leopard sejant Argent spotted Azure grasping with the dexter forepaw a curtana Argent hilt pommel and quillons Azure. Supporters: On either side a Curlew Proper.
	Thomas Bingham, Baron Bingham of Cornhill†, Lord of Appeal 2000-2008 Escutcheon: Per pale Or and Vert per chevron three ears of corn slipped and leaved all counterchanged. Crest: A griffin sejant erect Vert beaked and holding with both forefeet a key wards upwards and outwards Or. Supporters: On either side a running duck that on the dexter Vert beaked and legged Or and that on the sinister Or beaked and legged Vert. Motto: Pro Tanto Quid Retrisuamus
No arms known.	Richard Scott, Baron Scott of Foscote, Lord of Appeal in Ordinary 2000-2009 No arms known.
No arms known.	Alan Rodger, Baron Rodger of Earlsferry†, Lord of Appeal 2001-2009 and Justice of the Supreme Court 2009-2011 No arms known.
	Robert Walker, Baron Walker of Gestingthorpe, Lord of Appeal in Ordinary 2002-2009 and Justice of the Supreme Court 2009-2013 Escutcheon: Argent on a chevron between three dragons’ heads couped sable as many crescents Or. Crest: Issuing from flames Or a dragon’s head sable gorged with an eastern crown Or. Supporters: Two ostriches reguardant proper beaked headed legged and holding in the beaks an ear of wheat slipped and leaved Or. Motto: Mentem Mortalia Tangunt (Mortal Affairs Touch The Mind)
	Brenda Hale, Baroness Hale of Richmond, Lady of Appeal in Ordinary 2004-2009 and Justice of the Supreme Court 2009-2020 Escutcheon: Gules two scrolls in saltire Argent banded crosswise Vert attached thereto four seals in cross Or all between four towers crenellations outwards Argent. Supporters: Two frogs Vert crowned Or. Motto: Omnia Feminae Aequissimae (Everything To The Most Just Woman)
No arms known.	Robert Carswell, Baron Carswell, Lord of Appeal in Ordinary 2004-2009 No arms known.
No arms known.	Simon Brown, Baron Brown of Eaton-under-Heywood, Lord of Appeal in Ordinary 2004-2009 and Justice of the Supreme Court 2009-2012 No arms known.
No arms known.	Jonathan Mance, Baron Mance, Lord of Appeal in Ordinary 2005-2009 and Justice of the Supreme Court 2009-2018 No arms known.
No arms known.	David Neuberger, Baron Neuberger of Abbotsbury, Lord of Appeal in Ordinary 2007-2009 and Justice of the Supreme Court 2012-2017 No arms known.
No arms known.	Lawrence Collins, Baron Collins of Mapesbury, Lord of Appeal in Ordinary 2009 and Justice of the Supreme Court 2009-2011 No arms known.
	Brian Kerr, Baron Kerr of Tonaghmore, Lord of Appeal in Ordinary 2009 and Justice of the Supreme Court 2009-2020 Escutcheon: Paly of six Sable and Argent four swords interlaced in fret the points of two in chief and the points of two in base Or. Crest: A hare sejant Sable supporting with the dexter forefoot a harp Or. Supporters: On both sides a sea horse Argent finned maned and gorged with plain collar attached thereto a chain reflexed over the back terminating in a ring Or. Motto: Familia Semper Amicitia

== Supreme Court Justices appointed by Queen Elizabeth II (2009-2022) ==
Alive
Incumbent

Arms	Name of Justice (including peerage title, if any) and heraldic blazon
	Tony Clarke, Baron Clarke of Stone-cum-Ebony†, Justice of the Supreme Court 2009-2017 Escutcheon: Or on a fess between three griffin's heads erased Gules a lion passant guardant dimidiating the hulk of an ancient ship Or. Crest: Emerging from rosemary foliage Proper a griffin's head erased and holding in the beak Gules a key in bend sinister the ward downwards Or. Motto: Festina Lente (Diligently But Not Hurriedly)
	John Dyson, Lord Dyson, Justice of the Supreme Court 2010-2012 Note: Based on a sketch by his grandson Justin, involving "white roses of Yorkshire, stars of David, piano keys and mountains".
No arms known.	Nicholas Wilson, Lord Wilson of Culworth, Justice of the Supreme Court 2011-2020 No arms known.
No arms known.	Jonathan Sumption, Lord Sumption, Justice of the Supreme Court 2012-2018 No arms known.
No arms known.	Robert Reed, Lord Reed (later Baron Reed of Allermuir†), Justice of the Supreme Court since 2012 No arms known.
No arms known.	Robert Carnwath, Lord Carnwath of Notting Hill, Justice of the Supreme Court 2012-2020 No arms known.
No arms known.	Anthony Hughes, Lord Hughes of Ombersley, Justice of the Supreme Court 2013-2018 No arms known.
No arms known.	Roger Toulson, Lord Toulson, Justice of the Supreme Court 2013-2016 No arms known.
No arms known.	Patrick Hodge, Lord Hodge, Justice of the Supreme Court since 2013 No arms known.
No arms known.	Jill Black, Lady Black of Derwent, Justice of the Supreme Court 2017-2021 No arms known.
No arms known.	David Lloyd Jones, Lord Lloyd-Jones, Justice of the Supreme Court since 2017 No arms known.
	Michael Briggs, Lord Briggs of Westbourne, Justice of the Supreme Court since 2017 Motto: E Colloquiis Sapientia
	Mary Arden, Lady Arden of Heswall (also Baroness Mance by marriage), Justice of the Supreme Court 2018-2022 Escutcheon: Gules three crosses crosslet fitchy Or a chief Or the brissure of a woman in chief Gules. Motto: Patientia Vinces
No arms known.	David Kitchin, Lord Kitchin, Justice of the Supreme Court since 2018 No arms known.
	Philip Sales, Lord Sales, Justice of the Supreme Court since 2019 Escutcheon: Per chevron Or and Azure in chief two stacks of three closed books Argent bound Azure garnished and in base three bees one and two volant Or. Crest: Statant upon a balance Sable the pans Or an owl guardant also Or beaked and legged Gules holding in the dexter foot a sprig of oak Vert fructed Or. Motto: Semper Persat Sales
	Nicholas Hamblen, Lord Hamblen of Kersey, Justice of the Supreme Court since 2020 Escutcheon: Azure on a bend cotised Argent between two estoiles Or five water bougets bendwise alternate to the sinster and dexter Azure. Crest: Within a circle of estoiles Azure a demi lion Or grasping between the paws a branch of oak Azure leaves Or. Motto: Sapiens Judicio Constans Consilio
No arms known.	George Leggatt, Lord Leggatt, Justice of the Supreme Court since 2020 No arms known.
No arms known.	Andrew Burrows, Lord Burrows, Justice of the Supreme Court since 2020 No arms known.
No arms known.	Ben Stephens, Lord Stephens of Creevyloughgare, Justice of the Supreme Court since 2020 No arms known.
No arms known.	Vivien Rose, Lady Rose of Colmworth, Justice of the Supreme Court since 2021 No arms known.
No arms known.	David Richards, Lord Richards of Camberwell, Justice of the Supreme Court since 2022 No arms known.

== Supreme Court Justices appointed by King Charles III (2022-present) ==
Alive
Incumbent

Arms	Name of Justice (including peerage title, if any) and heraldic blazon
No arms known.	Ingrid Simler, Lady Simler, Justice of the Supreme Court since 2023 No arms known.

== See also ==
- Armorial of the speakers of the British House of Commons
- Armorial of Lord High Chancellors of Great Britain
- Armorial of prime ministers of the United Kingdom

== Notes ==
†Ennobled in pursuance of the Life Peerages Act 1958.
