= Working Animals International =

Global animal welfare charity

Working Animals International (formerly the Society for the Protection of Animals Abroad and The Society for the Protection of Animals in North Africa, abbreviated SPANA) is an international charity based in the United Kingdom that works to transform the lives of working animals, including horses, donkeys, mules, camels and other animals.

Working Animals International helps owners develop the knowledge and skills to care for their animals, increases access to veterinary care and campaigns for policy changes that help working animals.

In 2024, the charity reached 486,746 working animals in 22 countries. Working Animals International's registered charity number is 209015.

== History ==
The Society for the Protection of Animals in North Africa was founded on 2 October 1923 by Kate Hosali and her daughter Nina Hosali following a tour of North Africa from November 1920 to April 1922. During the tour, which included Morocco, Algeria and Tunisia, they witnessed widespread suffering and malnourishment of working animals and were compelled to take action when they returned home.

The founding meeting was held at 105 Jermyn Street, London and the charity’s first President was Winifred Anna Cavendish-Bentinck, who held the role from 1923 until her death in 1954.

On 18 July 1991, SPANA was renamed The Society for the Protection for Animals Abroad so that it could expand its work beyond North Africa. This included Mali in 1996, Mauritania in 2001, Ethiopia in 2003 and Zimbabwe in 2004.

On 15 June 2016, the charity launched International Working Animals Day – an annual day to raise awareness about the role that working animals play and the communities they support.

On 5 June 2022, a road in Nouakchott was named Rue SPANA in recognition of the charity’s work in Mauritania.

The charity celebrated its centenary on 2 October 2023.

On 22 April 2026, the organisation changed its name to Working Animals International to clarify its focus on working animals.

== Supporters ==
Notable supporters of the charity include Lady Odile Slynn and Rupert de Mauley. Celebrity supporters include John Craven, and ambassadors Peter Egan, Brian Blessed, Dame Twiggy Lawson, Dr Marc Abraham, Dr James Greenwood, Deborah Meaden and Jim Broadbent. Jim Broadbent’s parents were friends of the charity's co-founder Nina Hosali.
