= Odile Slynn =

French-born British humanitarian and philanthropist

The Right Honourable The Lady Slynn of Hadley
- Born: Odile Marie Henriette Boutin; 1936 (age 89–90); Paris
- Occupations: Nurse, university teacher, humanitarian
- Known for: Advocate of children's rights and wildlife preservation; founder and chairman of CINI UK, chairman of SPANA
- Spouse: Gordon Slynn, Baron Slynn of Hadley

Odile Slynn, Lady Slynn of Hadley (born 1936 in Paris) (née Boutin) is a French-born British humanitarian and philanthropist, involved in several organisations advocating children's rights and wildlife preservation. She is the founder and chairman of the British branch of Child In Need India (CINI) and former chairman of the Society for the Protection of Animals Abroad (SPANA). She is the widow of Gordon Slynn, Baron Slynn of Hadley.

== Life ==
Born in Paris, she was educated at Sorbonne University before she moved to London in 1959, where she trained as a nurse at Hammersmith Hospital. She married Gordon Slynn in 1962. She taught French at the University of Buckingham from 1980 until 2000 and became an honorary graduate of the university in 2003. When her husband was appointed a law lord and conferred a life peerage in 1992, she became Lady Slynn of Hadley.

== Charity Work ==
Odile Slynn has been involved with the Society for the Protection of Animals Abroad since 1979. During her time as chairman, she was instrumental in launching new branches in Jordan, Syria and Mali and a relaunch of Tunisia. She also serves as Non Executive Director of RISE Partnership Trust.

She was also a member of the Board of Visitors for HMP Grendon / Springhill 1981-97, member of the Parole Board (1988–1992) and chairman of its Awarding Committee from 1999. She has been Honorary Secretary to the British Moroccan Society since 1985.
