= Gordon Slynn, Baron Slynn of Hadley =

British judge

The Right Honourable The Lord Slynn of Hadley GBE PC
- Presiding over the Pinochet case, 1998

Second Senior Lord of Appeal in Ordinary
- In office 6 June 2000 – 30 September 2002
- Preceded by: The Lord Goff of Chieveley
- Succeeded by: The Lord Nicholls of Birkenhead

Lord of Appeal in Ordinary
- In office 11 March 1992 – 30 September 2002
- Nominated by: John Major
- Appointed by: Elizabeth II
- Preceded by: The Lord Bridge of Harwich
- Succeeded by: The Lord Walker of Gestingthorpe

Judge of the European Court of Justice
- In office 1988–1992
- Preceded by: Lord Mackenzie-Stuart
- Succeeded by: Sir David Edward

Advocate General of the European Court of Justice
- In office 1981–1988
- Preceded by: Jean-Pierre Warner
- Succeeded by: Sir Francis Jacobs

Member of the House of Lords
- Lord Temporal
- Lord of Appeal in Ordinary; 11 March 1992 – 7 April 2009

Personal details
- Born: Gordon Slynn; 17 February 1930
- Died: 7 April 2009 (aged 79)
- Spouse: Odile Marie Henriette Boutin
- Education: Goldsmiths, University of London; Trinity College, Cambridge
- Profession: Barrister

Gordon Slynn, Baron Slynn of Hadley GBE, PC (17 February 1930 – 7 April 2009) was a British judge and Advocate General of the European Court of Justice. He particularly specialised in European law. He was a Lord of Appeal in Ordinary.

== Early life ==
Slynn was born on 17 February 1930 to John and Edith Slynn and educated at Sandbach School, Goldsmiths, University of London, and Trinity College, Cambridge. He was called to the bar at Gray's Inn in 1956 before moving to One Hare Court alongside Henry Fisher, Patrick Neill, Roger Parker, and Richard Southwell, becoming a bencher in 1970 and Treasurer in 1988. He served as Junior Counsel to the Ministry of Labour between 1967 and 1968. He was the First Junior Treasury Counsel (Common Law), or "Treasury Devil", from 1968 to 1974.

Lord Denning said about Slynn in his capacity as such: "He was outstanding. The best I have ever known. He will go far." His successful application to take silk in 1974 coincided with his becoming the first Leading Counsel to the Treasury.

== Marriage ==
He married Odile Marie Henriette Boutin in 1962.

== Judicial career ==
He was appointed Recorder of Hereford in 1971 and as a judge of the Queen's Bench Division of the High Court in 1976, receiving the customary knighthood, serving additionally as President of the Employment Appeal Tribunal from 1978. In 1981, he left both these positions to become an Advocate General at the European Court of Justice (ECJ), and was appointed a Judge in 1988, a position he held until 1992.

He was appointed a Lord of Appeal in Ordinary on 11 March 1992, becoming a life peer as Baron Slynn of Hadley, of Eggington in the County of Bedfordshire, and being sworn of the Privy Council. He was a dissenter in the case R v. Brown, which upheld the legality of the criminal convictions resulting from Operation Spanner. As a member of the House of Lords, he served as Chairman of the House of Lords Select Sub-Committee on European Law and Institutions (1992–95), and as a member of the House of Lords Select Committee on Public Service (1996–98) and the Joint Parliamentary Committee on Corruption Bill (2003). He retired as a Law Lord in 2002.

He was appointed President of the Court of Appeal of the Solomon Islands in 2001 and was life President of the Lord Slynn of Hadley European Law Foundation and President of the Civil Mediation Council. From 1992-1996 he was President of The Academy of Experts.

== Legal education ==
Slynn was a supporter of legal education. He wrote a foreword to the book, How to Moot: a Student Guide to Mooting and sat as a judge in the Central and East European Moot Court. He was Honorary President of the Durham Mooting Society and an honorary member of the Jefferson Literary and Debating Society at the University of Virginia. He was a patron of Staffordshire University's Law School.

== Charitable work ==
Slynn was Patron of the UK wing of the Child in Need Institute (CINI) (CINI UK), founded by his wife Odile Slynn to help poor mothers and children in India.

He was a Trustee of The Loomba Trust, which cares for widows around the world, and Patron of the Bharatiya Vidya Bhavan Institute for Indian art and culture.

Slynn led a campaign to remove People's Mujahedin of Iran from the British and EU's blacklists.

== Honours & Arms ==
Slynn received honorary degrees from numerous institutions, and was Visitor of Mansfield College, Oxford from 1995–2002 and of the University of Essex from 1995–2000. He was Chief Steward of Hereford between 1978–2008 and received the Freedom of the City in 1996, and was President of the Bentham Club in 1992 and of the Holdsworth Club in 1993. He was knighted in 1976. He was made a Knight of the Order of St John in 1998, having received the Order of St John in 1992, and received the Grande Croix de l'Ordre de Mérite (Luxembourg) in 1998; appointed a Knight Cross, Order of Merit (Poland) in 1999; Grand Cross, Order of Merit (Malta) in 2001; Officer's Cross, Order of Merit (Hungary) in 2002; and the Cross of Solomon Islands in 2007. He was appointed Knight Grand Cross of the Order of the British Empire (GBE) in the 2009 New Year Honours for his services to the International Law Association which he served as Chairman of the Executive Committee. In 2000 he was presented with a 2-volume Liber Amicorum: Vol I, entitled "Judicial Review in European Union Law", was edited by Professor David O'Keeffe and Antonio Bavasso; Vol 2, entitled "Judicial Review in International Perspective", was edited by Mads Andenas and Duncan Fairgrieve; both volumes were published by Kluwer Law International (ISBN 90-411 1373-8 (set)). In 1991, he delivered the 43rd series of The Hamlyn Lectures, "Introducing a European Legal Order", published by Sweet & Maxwell (ISBN 0421463104). He was a member of White's, The Athenaeum, The Garrick, and The Beefsteak; a Chevalier du Tastevin, and a Commandeur d'Honneur de la Commanderie du Bontemps de Médoc et des Graves.

Coat of arms of Gordon Slynn, Baron Slynn of Hadley
Crest Within a crest coronet Or a tawny owl holding in the dexter claw a quill erect proper, the leg ringed Or. Escutcheon Argent, on a chevron Gules between three leopards' heads proper as many garbs Or. On a chief Azure three saltires couped Argent. Motto Conari Intellegere Orders Order of the British Empire

== See also ==
- List of members of the European Court of Justice

== Sources ==
- Who's Who 2009
