= Armorial of Lord High Chancellors of Great Britain =

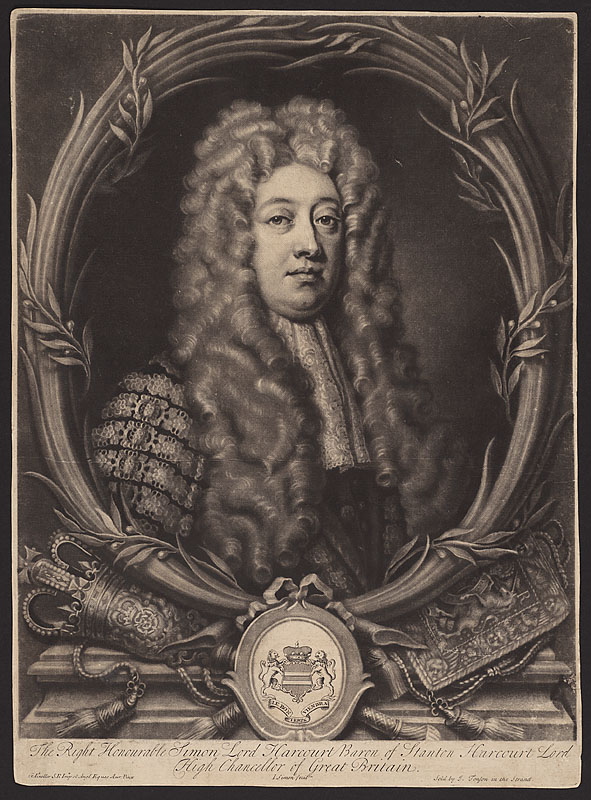
Portrait of Lord Harcourt, his arms between the purse and mace.

Prior to the Constitutional Reform Act 2005, nearly all Lord Chancellors were peers of the realm (if not already, then ennobled swiftly after taking office) and the principal presiding officer of the upper house of Parliament - now taken by the Lord Speaker. Shields of arms of former Chancellors are painted on the coving of the chamber (beneath the railings of the public viewing galleries) interspersed with the shields of arms of the monarchs whom they served.

== Lord Chancellors in the eighteenth century ==
Arms	Name of Chancellor (including peerage title, if any) and heraldic blazon
	William Cowper, 1st Baron Cowper, Lord Chancellor 1707–1710 and 1714-1718 Escutcheon: Argent three martlets Gules on a chief engrailed of the last three annulets Or. Crest: A lion's jamb erased Or holding a cherry branch Vert fructed Gules. Supporters: Two dun horses close cropped (except a tuft on the withers) and docked a large blaze down the face a black list down the back and three white feet viz both hind and the near fore foot. Motto: Tuum Est (It Is Thine)
	Simon Harcourt, 1st Viscount Harcourt, Lord Chancellor 1710–1714 Escutcheon: Gules two bars Or.
	Thomas Parker, 1st Earl of Macclesfield, Lord Chancellor 1718–1725 Escutcheon: Gules a chevron between three leopard faces Or.
	Peter King, 1st Baron King, Lord Chancellor 1725–1733 Escutcheon: Sable three spear heads Argent imbrued Proper on a chief Or three battle-axes Azure. Crest: A cubit arm vested Azure charged with three ermine spots in fess Or cuffed Argent grasping in the hand Proper the broken shaft of a spear in bend sinister Sable the butt Argent. Supporters: On either side a Mastiff Dog reguardant proper collared Gules.
	Charles Talbot, 1st Baron Talbot, Lord Chancellor 1733–1737 Escutcheon: Gules a lion rampant within a bordure engrailed Or. Crest: A talbot passant collared. Supporters: Dexter a talbot Proper sinister a lion Gules. Motto: Forte Et Fidele
	Philip Yorke, 1st Earl of Hardwicke, Lord Chancellor 1737–1756 Escutcheon: Argent on a saltire Azure a bezant.
	Robert Henley, 1st Earl of Northington, Lord Chancellor 1757–1766 Escutcheon: Azure, a lion rampant argent ducally crowned or a bordure of the second charged with eight torteaux.
	Charles Pratt, 1st Baron Camden, Lord Chancellor 1766–1770 Escutcheon: Quarterly 1st & 4th, Sable, on a Fess Argent, between three Elephant’s Heads erased Argent, three Mullets Sable (Pratt); 2nd, Sable, a Chevron between three Spear Heads Argent, the points embrued (Jeffreys), 3rd, Gules, an Inescutcheon Vair, between eight Cross-Crosslets Or (Molesworth).
	Charles Yorke, Lord Chancellor 1770 Escutcheon: Quarterly: 1st & 4th Argent on a saltire Azure a bezant 2nd & 3rd Sable a lion rampant guardant Or between three escallops Argent. Crest: A lion’s head erased Proper gorged with a collar Gules charged with a bezant.
	Henry Bathurst, 2nd Earl Bathurst, Lord Chancellor 1771–1778 Escutcheon: Sable two bars Ermine in chief three crosses pattée Or.
	Edward Thurlow, 1st Baron Thurlow, Lord Chancellor 1778–1792 Escutcheon: Argent on a chevron cottised Sable three portcullises of the field.
	Alexander Wedderburn, 1st Baron Loughborough, Lord Chancellor 1793–1801 Escutcheon: Argent, on a Chevron between three Roses Gules, a Fleur-de-lys of the field for difference.

== Lord Chancellors in the nineteenth century ==
Arms	Name of Chancellor (including peerage title, if any) and heraldic blazon
	John Scott, 1st Baron Eldon, Lord Chancellor 1801–1806 and 1807-1827 Escutcheon: Argent, three Lion’s Heads erased Gules, in chief an Anchor erect Sable, on a Chief wavy Azure, a Portcullis with chains Or. Crest: A Lion’s Head erased Gules, gorged with a Chain and pendant therefrom a Portcullis Or. 'Supporters: On either side a Lion guardant proper, gorged with a Double Chain and pendant therefrom a Portcullis with chains Or.
	Thomas Erskine, 1st Baron Erskine, Lord Chancellor 1806–1807 Escutcheon: Argent a pale Sable.
	John Copley, 1st Baron Lyndhurst, Lord Chancellor 1827–1830, 1834-1835 and 1841-1846 Escutcheon: Sable, on a Bend Or, between two Nag's Heads erased Argent, three Fleurs-de-lis Sable. Crest: An escallop Or in front of a dexter arm embowed in armour the hand grasping a sword and the cubit encircled with a chaplet of laurel all Proper. Supporters: Two eagles wings elevated Proper gorged with a plain collar Or and pendent therefrom a shield Argent charged with a cross flory Sable. Motto: Ultra Pergere (To Push Onward)
	Henry Brougham, 1st Baron Brougham and Vaux, Lord Chancellor 1830–1834 Escutcheon: Gules a chevron between three lucies hauriant Argent. Crest: A dexter arm in armour embowed Proper the hand holding a lucy fessewise Argent and charged on the elbow with a rose Gules. Supporters: Dexter a lion Vert armed and langued Gules gorged with a vaux collar checky Or and of the second, sinister a stag Argent attired and unguled Or holding in the mouth a rose Gules barbed and seeded Vert. Motto: Pro Rege Lege Grege (For The King The Law And The People)
	Charles Pepys, 1st Baron Cottenham, Lord Chancellor 1836–1841 Escutcheon: Sable, on a Bend Or, between two Nag's Heads erased Argent, three Fleurs-de-lis Sable.
	Thomas Wilde, 1st Baron Truro, Lord Chancellor 1850–1852 Crest: A hart lodged with a rose in its mouth Proper. Escutcheon: Ermine on a cross Sable a plate on a chief of the second three martlets Argent. Supporters: Two ermines Proper. Motto: Equabiliter Et Diligenter (Steadily And Diligently)
	Edward Sugden, 1st Baron St Leonards, Lord Chancellor 1852 Crest: A leopard's head erased Sable spotted and gorged with a baron's Coronet Or. Escutcheon: Azure on a fess Or between in chief two maidens' heads couped at the shoulders Proper and in base a leopard's head erased of the second spotted Sable an annulet Gules. Supporters: On either side a leopard Or pellety and gorged with a baron's coronet of the first lined Azure. Motto: Labore Vinces (By Labour Thou Shalt Conquer)
	Robert Rolfe, 1st Baron Cranworth, Lord Chancellor 1852–1858 and 1865-1866 Crest: A dove Argent in the beak a sprig of olive Proper ducally gorged Gules and resting the dexter foot upon three annulets interlaced Or. Escutcheon: Gyronny of eight Argent and Gules an eagle displayed Sable charged on the breast with a sun in splendour Or. Supporters: On either side a stag Or charged on the neck with four bandlets Sable upon the attires a ribbon Gules passing through an annulet Gold. Motto: Post Nubila Phœbus
	Frederic Thesiger, 1st Baron Chelmsford, Lord Chancellor 1858–1859 Crest: A cornucopia fesswise the horn Or the fruit Proper thereon a dove holding in the beak a sprig of laurel also Proper. Escutcheon: Gules a griffin segreant Or within an orle of roses Argent barbed and seeded Proper. Supporters: On either side a griffin Or winged Vair. Motto: Spes Et Fortuna (Hope and Fortune)
	John Campbell, 1st Baron Campbell, Lord Chancellor 1859–1861 Escutcheon: Gyronny of eight Sable and Or a border engrailed quarterly Or and Azure charged with eight buckles countercharged. Crest: A boar’s head erased gyronny of eight Sable and Or. Supporters: On an acanthus leaf bracket gold two lions guardant Gules the dexter collared Or pendant therefrom an escutcheon Azure charged with a saltire Argent the sinister gorged with a wreath of shamrocks proper pendant therefrom an escutcheon checky Or and Gules. Motto: Audacter Et Aperte.
	Richard Bethell, 1st Baron Westbury, Lord Chancellor 1861–1865 Escutcheon: Argent, on a chevron, engrailed azure, between three boars' heads couped sable, an estoile or, all within a bordure of the third
	Hugh Cairns, 1st Baron Cairns, Lord Chancellor 1868 and 1874-1880 Escutcheon: Gules three martlets Argent within a bordure of the second charged with three trefoils slipped Vert. Crest: A martlet Argent charged on the breast with a trefoil slipped Vert. Supporters: On either side a Hawk wings expanded Proper collared belled and chained Or holding in the beak a Trefoil slipped Vert.
	William Wood, 1st Baron Hatherley, Lord Chancellor 1868–1872 Escutcheon: Quarterly Argent and Or the sceptre or mace representing that of the Lord Mayor of the City of London (the same being of crystal the head terminating in crosses patties and fleurs-de-lis and the whole richly ornamented with gold, pearls, and precious stones) in pale, between an oak tree on a mount Vert fructed Proper in the 1st and 4th quarters; and in the 2nd and 3rd a bull's head erased, Sable, charged on the neck with a bezant. Crest: Out of a mural crown Argent a demi wild man wreathed about the temples with oak fructed in the dexter hand an oak tree eradicated and fructed and in the sinister hand a club all Proper. Supporters: On either side a wild man wreathed about the waist and temples with oak fructed across the shoulders a belt of ivy and in the exterior hand a club, all Proper. Motto: Defend The Right
	Roundell Palmer, 1st Baron Selborne, Lord Chancellor 1872–1874 and 1880-1885 Escutcheon: Argent on two bars Sable three trefoils slipped of the field in chief a greyhound courant of the second collard Or.
	Hardinge Giffard, 1st Baron Halsbury, Lord Chancellor 1885–1886, 1886-1892 and 1895-1905 Escutcheon: Sable three fusils conjoined in fess Ermine
	Farrer Herschell, 1st Baron Herschell, Lord Chancellor 1886 and 1892-1895 Escutcheon: Per fess Azure and Sable a fasces fesswise between three stags’ heads couped Or. Crest: On a mount Vert a stag Proper gorged with a collar gemel Azure the dexter forefoot supporting a fasces in bend Or. Supporters: On either side a stag Proper gorged with a collar gemel Azure and standing on a fasces Or. Motto: Celerite

== Lord Chancellors in the twentieth century ==
Arms	Name of Chancellor (including peerage title, if any) and heraldic blazon
	Robert Reid, 1st Baron Loreburn, Lord Chancellor 1905–1912 Escutcheon: Azure a lion rampant Argent on a chief engrailed Or a book expanded Proper between two keys in saltire Gules and two swords in saltire of the last. Crest: A cubit arm holding a book leaves expanded Proper. Supporters: On either side a collie dog Proper. Motto: Pro Virtute
	Richard Haldane, 1st Viscount Haldane, Lord Chancellor 1912–1915 and 1924 Crest: An eagle’s head erased Or. Escutcheon: Quarterly 1st & 4th Argent a saltire engrailed Sable (Haldane); 2nd Argent a saltire between four roses Gules (Lennox); 3rd Or a bend chequy Sable & Argent (Menteith); in the centre of the quarters a crescent Sable, all within a bordure Or. Motto: Suffer (Glory Gives Strength)
	Stanley Buckmaster, 1st Baron Buckmaster, Lord Chancellor 1915–1916 Crest: A Demi-Lion Azure holding in the dexter paw a Fleur-de-lis and charged on the shoulder with a Portcullis both Or. Escutcheon: Or semy of Fleurs-de-lis Azure a Lion rampant of the last on a Chief of the second a Portcullis of the first. Supporters: On either side a Buck proper each gorged with a Chain pendant therefrom a Portcullis Or. Motto: Equanimitas Magnanimitas (Equanimity, Magnanimity)
	Robert Finlay, 1st Baron Finlay, Lord Chancellor 1916–1919 Blazon not available.
	Frederick Smith, 1st Viscount Birkenhead, Lord Chancellor 1919–1922 Crest: A cubit arm couped fessways vested Gules cuffed Argent the hand Proper grasping a sword erect also Argent pommel and hilt Or. Escutcheon: Ermine on a pale Gules between four cross crosslets of the second a like cross Or. Supporters: Dexter a griffin Or wings per fess Or and Sable, sinister a lion Azure charged on the shoulder with a crozier Or. Motto: Faber Meæ Fortunæ
	George Cave, 1st Viscount Cave, Lord Chancellor 1922–1924 and 1924-1928 Escutcheon: Or fretty Azure a cross moline within a bordure nebuly Gules on a chief of the last two greyhounds' heads erased of the first. Crest: A greyhound sejant Or pellettée, resting the dexter leg on a cross moline Gules. Motto: Cave Deus Videt (Beware God Sees)
	Douglas Hogg, 1st Viscount Hailsham, Lord Chancellor 1928–1929 and 1935-1938 Crest: A Stag proper gorged with a Collar Argent charged with three Lozenges conjoined Gules and supporting with the dexter leg an Escutcheon also Argent charged with four Lozenges conjoined in fess Gules between two Barrulets Sable and in chief a Rose also Gules. Escutcheon: Out of an Eastern crown Argent, an oak tree fructed Proper, and pendent therefrom an escutcheon Azure, charged with a dexter arm embowed in Armour, the hand grasping an arrow in bend sinister point downwards Proper. Supporters: Dexter: A ram Argent, armed and unguled Or, supporting a representation of the Lord High Chancellor's mace Proper, Sinister: a ram Argent, armed and langued Gules, supporting a representation of the Lord High Chancellor's purse Proper. Motto: Dat Gloria Vires (Glory Gives Strength)
	John Sankey, 1st Viscount Sankey, Lord Chancellor 1929–1935 Blazon not available.
	Frederic Maugham, Baron Maugham, Lord Chancellor 1938–1939 Blazon not available.
	Thomas Inskip, 1st Viscount Caldecote, Lord Chancellor 1939–1940 Crest: Upon the battlements of a tower a grouse’s leg erased Proper. Escutcheon: Per chevron Azure and Argent in chief two crosses pate Or and in base an eagled displayed of the first. Supporters: On the dexter side a talbot and on the sinister side a pegasus Proper each charged on the shoulder with a garb Or. Motto: Be Careful
	John Simon, 1st Viscount Simon, Lord Chancellor 1940–1945 Crest: Upon a well Proper an eagle rising Or. Escutcheon: Gules three Lotus Flowers in pale proper between two Flaunches Or each charged with a Lion rampant of the field. Supporters: Dexter: a Guillemot; Sinister: a Monal Proper. Motto: J'Ai Ainsi Mon Nom (Such Is My Name)
	William Jowitt, 1st Viscount Jowitt, Lord Chancellor 1945–1951 Crest: A lion sejant guardant Gules the dexter forepaw supporting an escutcheon of the arms Escutcheon: Azure, on a chevron Argent between two chaplets of oak in chief and a lion sejant guardant in base Or three bugle-horns stringed Sable; Supporters: On either side a spaniel with a Chancellor's Purse Proper that on the dexter charged with a rose Argent and that on the sinister with a rose Gules both barbed and seeded also Proper suspended from the neck by a cord Or. Motto: Tenax et Fidelis
	Gavin Simonds, Baron Simonds, Lord Chancellor 1951–1954 Crest: An Ermine proper resting the sinister paw upon the Astronomical Sign of Taurus Sable and holding in the mouth a Trefoil slipped Or. Escutcheon: Tierced in pale Azure, Gules and Vert three Trefoils slipped Or. Supporters: On either side an Ermine proper each charged on the shoulder the dexter with an Hop Leaf and the sinister with a Bezant; Motto: Simplex Munditiis
	David Maxwell Fyfe, 1st Viscount Kilmuir, Lord Chancellor 1954–1962 Crest: A Demi-Lion rampant Gules armed and langued Azure between six Ears of Wheat Or three on each side. Escutcheon: Or a Lion rampant Gules armed and langued Azure on a Chief of the second a Water Bouget between two Mullets a Bordure invected Argent. Supporters: Dexter: A Griffin Or gorged with a Collar Gules charged with a Water Bouget between two Mullets Argent; Sinister: A Dragon Gules armed and langued Vert gorged with a collar of the same embordured invected Argent. Motto: Decens Et Honestum
	Reginald Manningham-Buller, 1st Baron Dilhorne, Lord Chancellor 1962–1964 Escutcheon: Sable, on a cross argent quarter pierced of the field four eagles displayed of the first.
	Gerald Gardiner, Baron Gardiner, Lord Chancellor 1964–1970 Crest: A Stag proper gorged with a Collar Argent charged with three Lozenges conjoined Gules and supporting with the dexter leg an Escutcheon also Argent charged with four Lozenges conjoined in fess Gules between two Barrulets Sable and in chief a Rose also Gules. Escutcheon: Gules a Plain Fess with Cottises engrailed Argent between four Roses three in chief and one in base of the last. Supporters: Dexter: a Pegasus Argent; Sinister: a Dragon Gules. Motto: In Deo Confidecti Age (Trust in God, act rightly)
	Quintin Hogg, Baron Hailsham of St Marylebone, Lord Chancellor 1970–1974 and 1979-1987 Crest: A Stag proper gorged with a Collar Argent charged with three Lozenges conjoined Gules and supporting with the dexter leg an Escutcheon also Argent charged with four Lozenges conjoined in fess Gules between two Barrulets Sable and in chief a Rose also Gules. Escutcheon: Out of an Eastern crown Argent, an oak tree fructed Proper, and pendent therefrom an escutcheon Azure, charged with a dexter arm embowed in Armour, the hand grasping an arrow in bend sinister point downwards Proper. Supporters: Dexter: A ram Argent, armed and unguled Or, supporting a representation of the Lord High Chancellor's mace Proper, Sinister: a ram Argent, armed and langued Gules, supporting a representation of the Lord High Chancellor's purse Proper. Motto: Dat Gloria Vires (Glory Gives Strength)
	Elwyn Jones, Baron Elwyn-Jones, Lord Chancellor 1974–1979 Escutcheon: Per saltire Gules and barry wavy Argent and Azure two crane arms in saltire the hooks pendant between in chief a portcullis chained and in base a balance Or. Crest: Out of a mural crown Or between two dragon’s wings Gules from a panache an (eagle’s?) claw holding two hammers in saltire Or. Supporters: Dexter a man Proper vested Azure the trousers Brunatre wearing an apron and a scarf Argent holding in the dexter hand blacksmiths’ pliers Proper; sinister a woman Proper vested Azure and Argent holding on the sinister arm a basket of potatoes and leeks Proper. Motto: Gwna Dy Orau
	Michael Havers, Baron Havers, Lord Chancellor 1987–1987 Blazon not available.
	James Mackay, Baron Mackay of Clashfern, Lord Chancellor 1987–1997 Crest: A Dexter Arm couped at the Elbow proper the hand grasping a Pair of Balances Or. Escutcheon: Azure on a Chevron Argent between two Bears' Heads couped Argent muzzled Gules in chief and a Fleece Argent in base a Roebuck's Head erased between two Hands grasping Daggers the points turned towards the buck's head all proper. Supporters: Dexter: a Male Figure attired in the Robes of the Lord High Chancellor; Sinister: a Male Figure attired in the Robes of one of Her Majesty's Counsel learned in the Law in Scotland proper. Motto: Manu Justi (With the hand of a just man)
	Derry Irvine, Baron Irvine of Lairg, Lord Chancellor 1997–2003 Escutcheon: Argent three holly leaves Proper on a chief Azure two bears' heads couped of the first muzzled Gules. Crest: A man in the attire of the Lord Chancellor's purse bearer and carrying the Lord Chancellor's purse Proper. Supporters: Dexter a salmon Proper having in its mouth a signet ring Or sinister a lion per fess Or and Sable. Motto: Do The Right

== Lord Chancellors in the twenty-first century ==
Arms	Name of Chancellor (including peerage title, if any) and heraldic blazon
	Charlie Falconer, Baron Falconer of Thoroton, Lord Chancellor 2003–2007 Escutcheon: Per pale Or and Argent two barrulets per pale Ermine and Erminois over all a falcon's head erased Azure grasping in the beak pendent a Mediterranean sweet briar rose affronty Proper slipped Sable all between three mullets Azure. Crest: A falcon Or supporting with the dexter claws a pilgrim's pikestaff connected by a chain Argent to a ring around the sinister leg also Argent. Supporters: On either side a falcon Or murally gorged Argent masoned Sable the exterior leg of each falcon standing on a bugle horn Azure banded Argent the bell inwards that to the dexter with a round buckle Or attached to the collar by a line Azure and that to the sinister with a falcon's bell attached to the collar by a line Azure.
No arms known.	Jack Straw, Lord Chancellor 2007–2010 No arms known
No arms known.	Kenneth Clarke (later Baron Clarke of Nottingham), Lord Chancellor 2010–2012 No arms known
No arms known.	Chris Grayling (later Baron Grayling), Lord Chancellor 2012–2015 No arms known
No arms known.	Michael Gove (later Baron Gove), Lord Chancellor 2015–2016 No arms known
No arms known.	Liz Truss, Lord Chancellor 2016–2017 No arms known
No arms known.	David Lidington, Lord Chancellor 2017–2018 No arms known
No arms known.	David Gauke, Lord Chancellor 2018–2019 No arms known
No arms known.	Robert Buckland, Lord Chancellor 2019–2021 No arms known
No arms known.	Dominic Raab, Lord Chancellor 2021–2022 and 2022–2023 No arms known
No arms known.	Brandon Lewis, Lord Chancellor 2022 No arms known
No arms known.	Alex Chalk, Lord Chancellor 2023–2024 No arms known
No arms known.	Shabana Mahmood, Lord Chancellor 2024-2025 No arms known
No arms known.	David Lammy, Lord Chancellor 2025-2026 No arms known
No arms known.	Alex Norris, Lord Chancellor 2026–present No arms known

== See also ==
- Armorial of the speakers of the British House of Commons
- Armorial of Lords of Appeal
- Armorial of prime ministers of the United Kingdom
