= List of awards and honours received by Stanley Baldwin =

Stanley Baldwin received numerous honours in recognition of his career in politics. These included:

== Hereditary Peerage ==
Baldwin was elevated to the House of Lords on 8 June 1937, upon his standing down as Leader of the Conservative Party and from his seat in the House of Commons. He took the title of Earl Baldwin of Bewdley, with the subsidiary title of Viscount Corvedale, of Corvedale in the County of Salop. He sat with the Conservative Party.

== Coat of arms ==
Coat of arms of Stanley Baldwin, 1st Earl Baldwin of Bewdley
Coronet A Coronet of an Earl Crest A Cockatrice sejant wings addorsed Argent combed wattled and beaked Or gorged with a Crown Vallary lined and reflexed over the back Gold and charged on the shoulder with a Rose Gules barbed and seeded proper Escutcheon Argent on a Saltire Sable a Quatrefoil Or Supporters On either side a White Owl proper, that on the sinister holding in the beak a Sprig of Broom also proper Motto Per Deum Meum Transilio Murum (With the help of my God I leap over the wall)

== Commonwealth honours ==
Commonwealth Realms

Country	Date	Decoration	Post-nominal letters
United Kingdom	1897 – 14 December 1947	Justice of the Peace for the County of Worcestershire	JP
United Kingdom	5 June 1920 – 14 December 1947	Member of His Majesty's Most Honourable Privy Council	PC
Canada	2 August 1927 – 14 December 1947	Member of the King's Privy Council for Canada	PC
England	28 May 1937 – 14 December 1947	Knight of the Order of the Garter	KG

Decorations and medals

Country	Date	Decoration	Post-nominal letters
United Kingdom	12 May 1937	King George VI Coronation Medal	

== Other distinctions ==
=== Scholastic ===
University Degrees

Location	Date	School	Degree
England		Trinity College, Cambridge	Third-class honours Bachelor of Arts (BA) in History
England		Mason College	Metallurgy

Chancellor, visitor, governor, rector and fellowships

Location	Date	School	Position
Scotland	1923 – 1926	University of Edinburgh	Rector
Scotland	1928 – 1931	University of Glasgow	Rector
Scotland	1929 – 1947	University of St Andrews	Chancellor
England	1930 – 1947	University of Cambridge	Chancellor
England	1930 – 1947	Girton College, Cambridge	Visitor

Honorary Degrees

Location	Date	School	Degree
England	12 June 1923	University of Cambridge	
England	1925	University of Oxford	Doctor of Civil Law (DCL)
England	26 January 1934	University of Liverpool	

=== Memberships and fellowships ===
Country	Date	Organisation	Position
United Kingdom	1927 – 14 December 1947	Royal Society	Fellow (FRS)
United Kingdom	1938	Marylebone Cricket Club	President

== Freedom of the City ==
- (England) 15 November 1923: Worcester.
- (England) 13 March 1925: Leeds.
- (England) 8 August 1925: Bewdley.
- (Scotland) 5 October 1925: Glasgow.
- (Scotland) 14 June 1926: Edinburgh.
- (Wales) 1928: Aberystwyth
- (England) Unknown: London.

== Places named after Baldwin ==
Canada (British Columbia) Mount Stanley Baldwin (1927).
