= Fiske Goodeve Fiske-Harrison =

Fiske Goodeve Fiske-Harrison (2 September 1793 – 1872) of Copford Hall, Lord of the manor of Copford was High Sheriff of Essex.

Fiske-Harrison of Copford Hall Coat of Arms, Burke's Armoury (1848)

He was born Fyske Goodeve Harrison on 2 September 1793 at Copford Hall, Essex, to John Haynes Harrison.

John Haynes Harrison had inherited the manor from his first cousin, Hezekiah Haynes, a Major General in the army of Oliver Cromwell. Hezekiah Haynes had inherited it from his father, John Haynes, who had purchased it from the Mountjoy family. However, John Haynes lived mainly in the Americas where he was the first Governor of the Massachusetts Bay Colony and later Connecticut.

John Haynes Harrison married Sarah Thomas Fiske, only child and heiress of Reverend John Fiske of Thorpe Morieux, Suffolk. The Fiske Family Papers, a history of the family, states that she was heiress to £18,000 on her marriage in 1789.

Sarah Thomas Fiske from a portrait reproduced in The Fiske Family Papers

Fiske-Harrison was educated at Charterhouse School, 1806-1810, and St John's College, Cambridge. He served in the East Essex Regular Militia, rising to the rank of Major (gazetted in 1828).

He changed his surname to Fiske-Harrison on inheriting his mother's estates after her death, and became Lord of the manor of Copford on his father's death in 1839. He married Jane, daughter of James Sparrow, in 1826.

He served as a magistrate, rising to Justice of the Peace, and as High Sheriff of Essex in 1827.

He died in 1872.

On his death Copford Hall, and the Lordship of the Manor, passed to his brother, and the most recent holder of the title and the hall was his descendant, MP for Maldon in Essex, Brian Harrison. The current Fiske-Harrison family, of Fiske & Co the City of London bank, are descended from his cousin William Fiske, Lord of Stadhaugh Manor in Laxfield Suffolk.
