= Clive Fiske Harrison =

The Arms of Harrison of Layer-de-la-Haye in Essex, quartering by descent Ffyske of Stadhaugh in Suffolk, Lords of the Manor, 1397, Ffyske grandquartering by descent Dallyng of Laxfield, Masters of Trinity Hall, Cambridge 1443. (From a 1897 bookplate)

Clive Fiske Harrison (born 23 November 1939) is a retired English stockbroker. For half a century, he was senior partner, then chief executive and latterly chairman of Fiske plc, the oldest remaining independent stockbroking firm in the City of London.

== Early life ==
According to Debrett's, Fiske Harrison was educated at Felsted School and Trinity Hall, Cambridge, and worked at Panmure Gordon, as a stockbroker, alongside British Prime Minister David Cameron's father Ian Cameron, before joining Fiske & Co in the early 1970s.

== Fiske and Co ==
In 1975, Fiske & Co merged with stockbrokers Bragg, Stockdale, Hall & Co, founded by John Bragg in 1824, and then headed by Michael Brudenell-Bruce, 8th Marquess of Ailesbury. Lord Ailebsury became a partner at Fiske & Co, and later joined the board when it became a limited company. The merger was of the two equal partners, The Times and the merged venture continued as "Fiske & Co, also incorporating Bragg, Stockdale, Hall & Co." Following the acquisition of all older firms such as Quilter & Co, founded in 1777, Cazenove & Co and James Capel & Co, both founded in 1823, the merged business became the oldest independent stockbroking house in the City of London today.

Fiske grew to over a billion pounds under investment, becoming a publicly listed company in 2000, Fiske plc, and due to its then CEO's sceptical investment policy during the dot-com bubble of the late 90s, it was named the top British stockbroker by the financial news service Bloomberg in 2000. In 2009, during the Great Recession, the City Editor of The Times commented: "One person whose views I respect is Clive Fiske Harrison who runs Fiske & Co, the stockbroker. He has spent no less than 47 years in the stock market. In a letter to clients and friends just before Christmas he warned that the market's reaction to the present problems was still relatively modest in the context of past crises and almost certainly had further to go."

In 2012, the City Editor of the Evening Standard wrote, "50 years ago today Fiske’s chairman, Clive, joined Panmure Gordon, then one of the leading brokers. A fellow junior colleague in Panmure at that time was David Mayhew. He, like Clive, has survived the intervening years of change rather better than has Panmure. (Mayhew stood down as chairman of J. P. Morgan Cazenove at the end of last year.)" Having begun at Bache & Co., now Prudential-Bache Securities, in New York in 1961 under Harold L. Bache – to whose advice on weathering financial storms like the Wall Street crash of 1929 he referred during more subsequent crises – followed by working at Nomura Securities in Tokyo, before joining Pannmure Gordon in London and then Fiske, Clive retired on his 84th birthday in 2023 after more than 62 years in the markets.

== Family ==
According to Burke's, he is a relation of Major Fiske Goodeve Fiske-Harrison of Copford Hall in Copford, Essex, High Sheriff of Essex, and himself resides in the nearby village of Layer de la Haye and also in Eaton Square in Belgravia, London. He has three sons. His eldest son Byron was a cavalry officer in the British Army before becoming a stockbroker at Cazenove & Co and later a director of Goldman Sachs. His second son Jules was, according to The Times, a "famously skilled and fearless skier" who died in a skiing accident in Zermatt, Switzerland in 1988 and his youngest son Alexander is an author, polo player, bullfighter and director of Fiske plc.
