= Brian Harrison (Conservative politician) =

British politician (1921–2011)

(Alastair) Brian Clarke Harrison DL (3 October 1921 – 21 August 2011) was a British Conservative Party politician.

Harrison was born in 1921 in Melbourne, Australia. He was the son of the soldier and politician Eric Harrison. He was educated at Geelong Grammar School and during World War II served in the Australian Army from 1940 and as a volunteer with the Australian Independent Companies (Commandos) in Halmahera and Borneo.

After the war he was at Trinity College, Cambridge. He rowed for Cambridge in the record-breaking crew in the 1948 Boat Race. Most of the crew rowed for Great Britain in the 1948 Summer Olympics; Harrison did not participate in the Games as Australia did not enter a squad.

Harrison returned to Australia from 1950 to 1951 and studied immigration and development. As a descendant of Fiske Goodeve Fiske-Harrison he inherited Copford Hall, and became Lord of the manor of Copford in Essex, England where he then settled to become a farmer and estate manager. He became London director of the Commercial Bank of Australia in January 1966. He served as a councillor on Lexden and Winstree Rural District Council in Essex. He was also High Sheriff of Essex in 1979 and a deputy lieutenant of the county.

Harrison was elected in the 1955 general election as member of parliament (MP) for Maldon and served until he stood down in February 1974 general election. He served as Parliamentary Private Secretary to John Hare while Hare was Minister of State for the Colonies between 1955 and 1956, Secretary of State for War from 1956 to 1958 and Minister of Agriculture, Fisheries and Food from 1958 to 1960.

Harrison died in Colchester on 21 August 2011 aged 89 following a short illness.

== See also ==
- List of Cambridge University Boat Race crews

Parliament of the United Kingdom
Preceded by Tom Driberg	Member of Parliament for Maldon; 1955 – Feb 1974	Succeeded by John Wakeham
