= Flaying =

Method of execution

Flaying is a method of slow torture or execution in which skin is removed from a substantial portion of a body. This is also referred to as flaying alive. Records also attest to corpses flayed post-mortem in effort to desecrate them. Flaying is perceived as unusually cruel and may be motivated by metaphysical or ritualistic ideas (e.g., denial of bodily resurrection), propaganda, or human trophy collecting used for purposes of deterrence and power display. In modern discussion, flaying is invoked as an example of barbarism from a less-civilized age.

"Flaying" is generally perceived as distinct from a similar act performed on a dead animal (as to obtain its meat, hide or fur), which is more commonly called "skinning."

== Cause of death ==
Dermatologist Ernst G. Jung notes that the typical causes of death due to flaying are shock, critical loss of blood or other body fluids, hypothermia, or infections, and that the actual death is estimated to occur from a few hours up to a few days after the flaying.

== History ==
=== Assyrian tradition ===
According to Ancient Near East studies scholar Francesca Minen, the practice of flaying was mentioned as early as the Middle Assyrian times, in the records of Aššur-bel-kala, but is most commonly described in the records of Neo-Assyrian Empire. Those subject to the punishment included men of several social strata, from eminent captives, to troops, down to the general population. In texts, the most common verbs employed to describe this act are "kâṣu" and "šaḫātu", both attested in texts describing the process of butchering animals. Victims included both the living and the dead. Impalement and amputation are described as happening in tandem with flaying, with no set order. However, it seems flaying was generally performed in the presence of the king as a symbolic form of prostration and humiliation before the sovereign. Flayed skins were described as put on display.

In their royal edicts, the Neo-Assyrian kings seem to gloat over the terrible fate they imposed upon their captives and that flaying seems, in particular, to be the fate meted out to rebel leaders. From Ashurnasirpal II:

I built a pillar over against the city gate and I flayed all the chiefs who had revolted and I covered the pillar with their skins. Some I impaled upon the pillar on stakes and others I bound to stakes round the pillar. I cut the limbs off the officers who had rebelled.

The Rassam cylinder in the British Museum describes this: "Their corpses they hung on stakes, they took off their skins and covered the city wall with them."

==== In artwork ====
At least three visual representations of flaying Neo-Assyrian from preserved bas-reliefs:

Depictions of flaying in Assyrian bas-reliefs

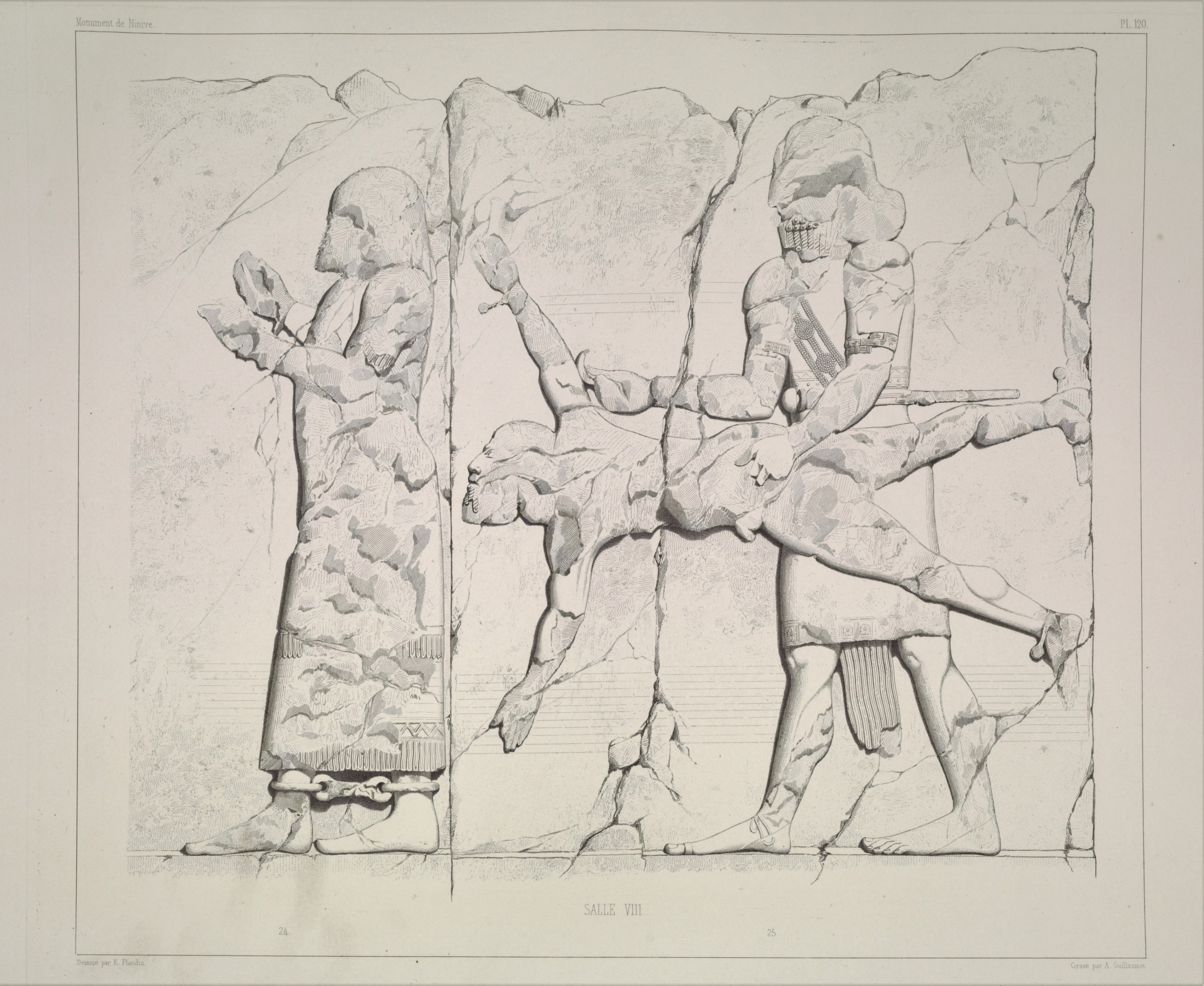
From the Palace of Sargon II in Dur-Sharrukin (room VIII, slab 25) depicts the flaying of Yahu-Bihdi c. 720 BCE following his unsuccessful revolt in Hamath.

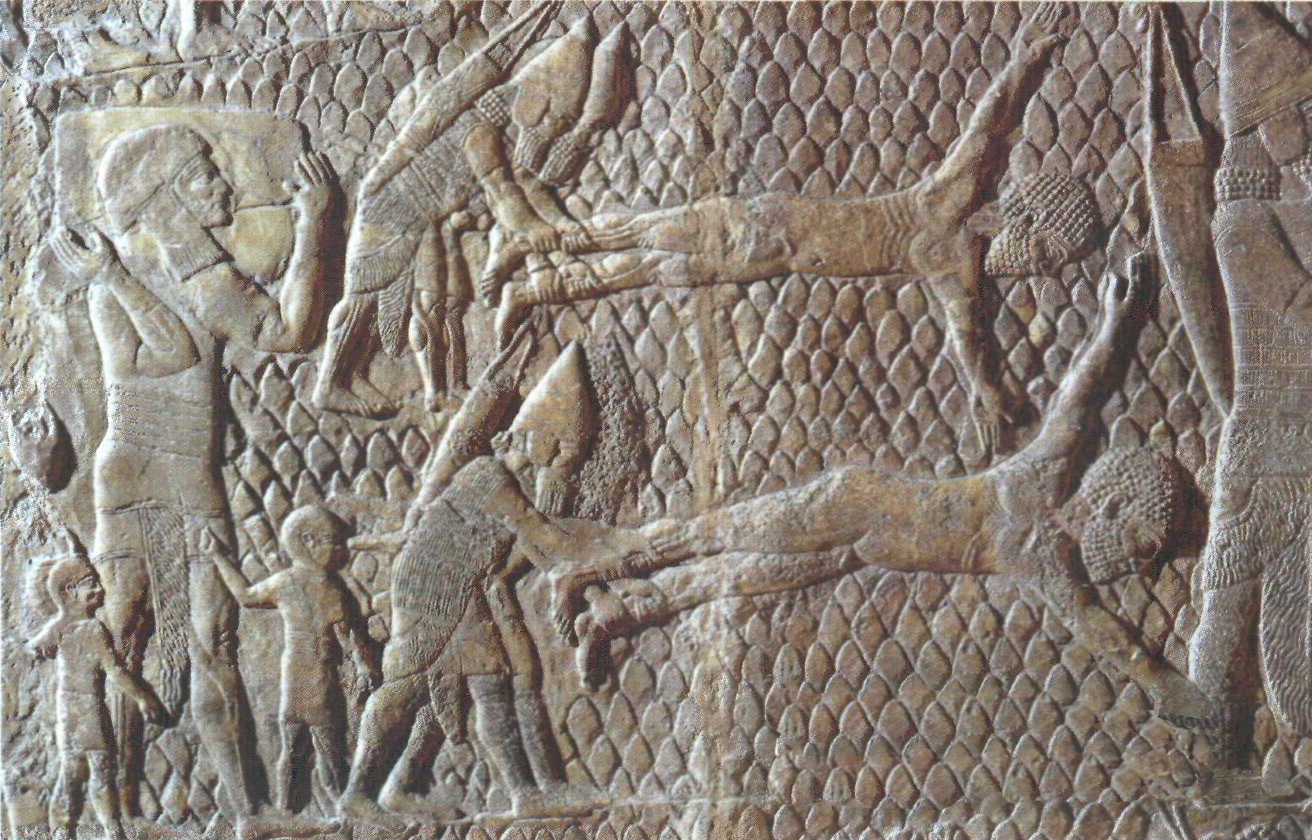
From the South-West Palace of Nineveh (room XXXVI, slabs 9–10) depicts flaying the Siege of Lachish (701 BCE) under Sennacherib.

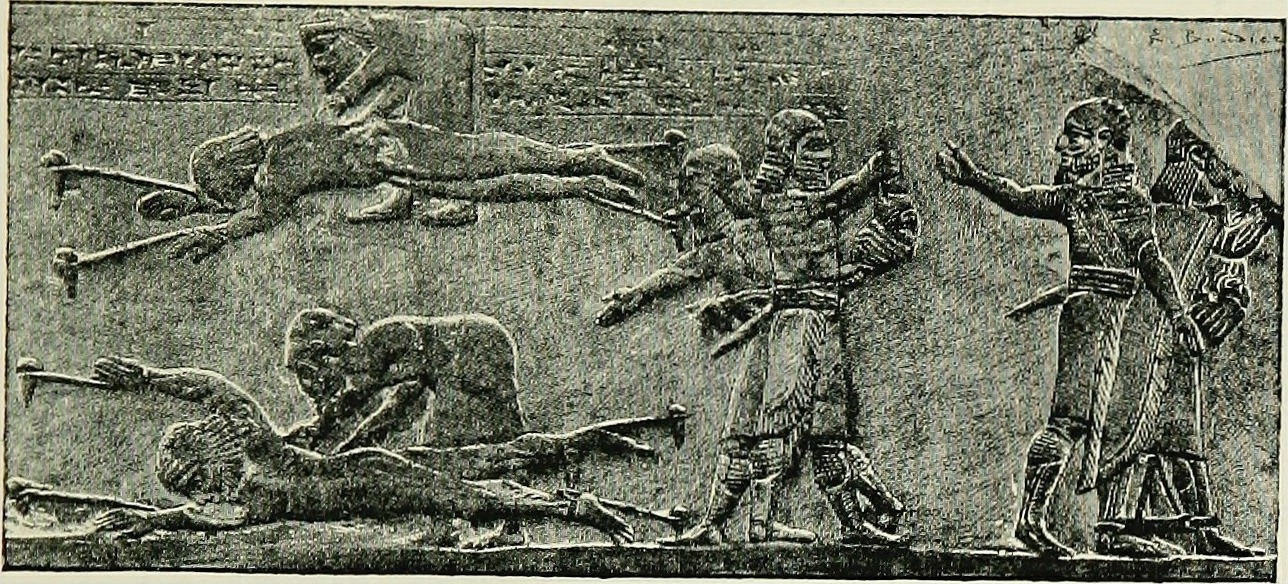
From the South-West Palace of Nineveh (room XXXIII, slab 4) depicts Ashurbanipal’s victory in the Battle of Ulai (653 BCE) with the flaying of Elamite chiefs at the crowning of Neo-Assyrian client-king Ummanigash.

=== In Christian hagiography ===
Several Christian hagiographies record the martyrdom of Bartholomew the Apostle as occurring by flaying.

In the Hellenic tradition, Bartholomew was executed in Albanopolis in Armenia, where he was martyred for having converted Polymius, the local king, to Christianity. Enraged by the monarch's conversion, and fearing a Roman backlash, King Polymius's brother, Prince Astyages, ordered Bartholomew's torture and execution. However, this version of the story appears ahistorical, as there are no records of any Armenian king of the Arsacid dynasty of Armenia with the name "Polymius". Other accounts of his martyrdom name the king as either Agrippa (identified with Tigranes VI), or Sanatruk, king of Armenia.

Regardless of historicity, the story of Bartholomew's flaying was employed in the tradition in Western art and Christian iconography in which saints are identified with the means of their martyrdom.

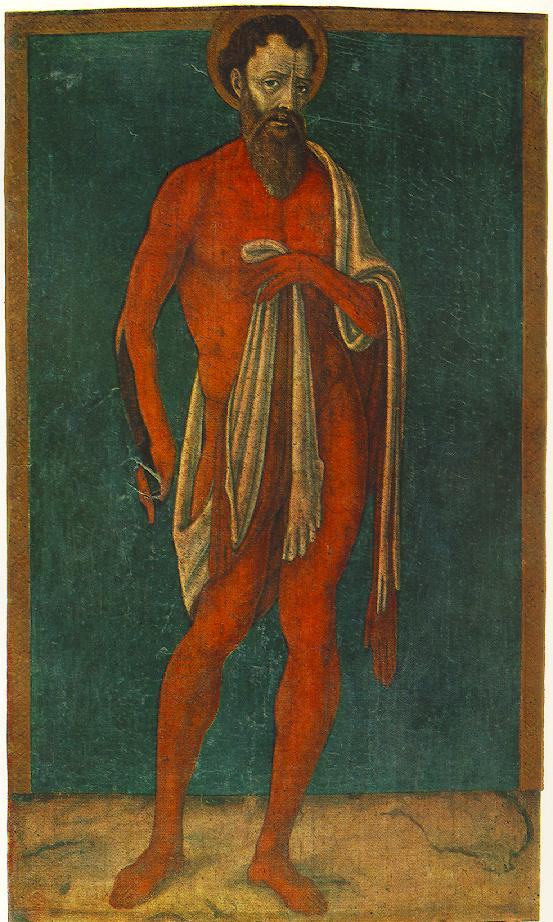
Saint Bartholomew by Matteo di Giovanni (c. 1480)

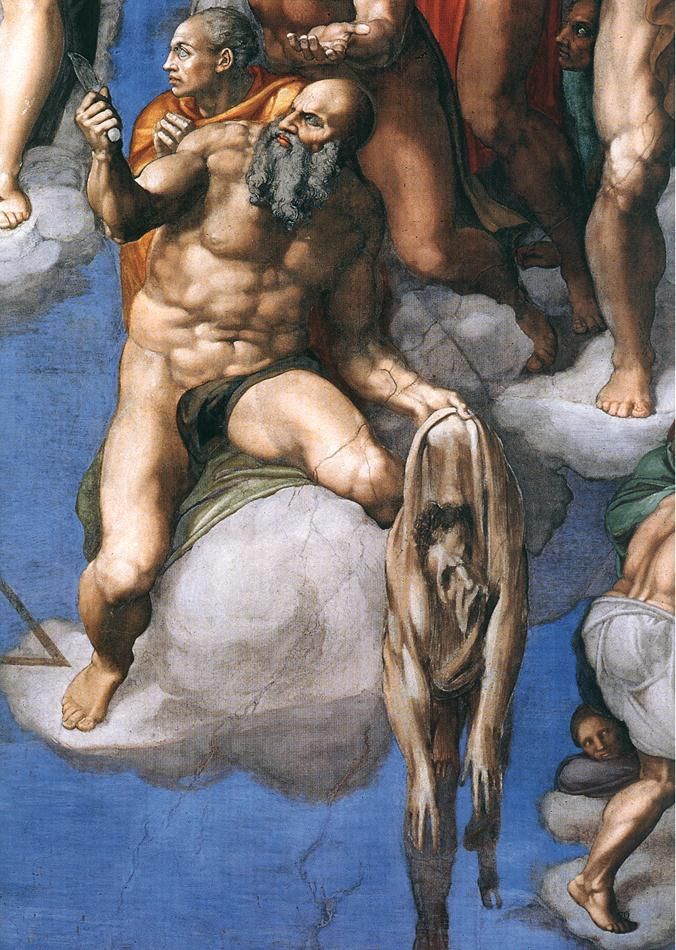
St Bartholomew as depicted in Michelangelo's The Last Judgment from the Sistine Chapel (c. 1536 – c. 1541)

St. Bartholomew by Rembrandt (1657), in which reference to flaying is reduced to the subject holding a knife.

St. Bartholomew, a marble copy of a composition by Pierre Le Gros II (c. 1738)

=== Other examples ===
Searing or cutting the flesh from the body was sometimes used as part of the public execution of traitors in medieval Europe. A similar mode of execution was used as late as the early 18th century in France; one such episode is graphically recounted in the opening chapter of Michel Foucault's Discipline and Punish: The Birth of the Prison (1979).

In 1303, the treasury of Westminster Abbey was robbed while holding a large sum of money belonging to King Edward I. After the arrest and interrogation of 48 monks, three of them, including the subprior and sacristan, were found guilty of the robbery and flayed. Their skin was attached to three doors as a warning against robbers of church and state. At St Michael & All Angels Church in Copford in Essex, England, it is claimed that human skin was found attached to an old door, though evidence seems elusive.

In Chinese history, Sun Hao, Fu Sheng and Gao Heng were known for removing skin from people's faces. The Hongwu Emperor flayed corrupt officials who embezzled more than 60 taels of silver. Hai Rui suggested that his emperor flay corrupt officials. The Zhengde Emperor flayed six rebels, and Zhang Xianzhong also flayed many people. Lu Xun said the Ming dynasty was begun and ended by flaying.

== See also ==
- Anthropodermic bibliopegy (books bound in human skin)
- Degloving
- Écorché
- Excarnation
- Lingchi
- Scalping

== Bibliography ==
- Jung, Ernst G. (2007). "Von Ursprung des Schindens in Assyrien", in "Kleine Kulturgeschichte Der Haut". Springer Verlag. ISBN 9783798517578.
