= Alexander Fiske-Harrison =

English author, journalist & conservationist

- Born: 22 July 1976 (age 50); London
- Education: Eton; Oxford
- Occupations: Author, journalist and conservationist
- Website: www.alexanderfiskeharrison.com

Alexander Rupert Fiske-Harrison (born 22 July 1976) is an English author and journalist, naturalist and conservationist.

His writing is known for his immersion in his subject matter. He trained and worked for some years as a method actor. For his first book Into The Arena: The World Of The Spanish Bullfight he became a bullfighter. For his second, The Bulls Of Pamplona, he became a bull-runner. He is presently researching for a book on wolves in the United States.

In 2011, he was shortlisted for the William Hill Sports Book of the Year for Into The Arena, his fiction "Les Invincibles" was a finalist in Le Prix Hemingway International in France in 2016, and his work "The Feldkirch Crossing", was shortlisted for the Mogford Prize of the Financial Times Weekend Oxford Literary Festival in 2021.

He was appointed a director of Fiske plc on 13 February 2013, and is a managing director of Bragg, Stockdale, Hall & Co. Ltd., founded in 1824.

== Background and personal life ==
He is the youngest son of Clive Fiske Harrison. His brother Jules William Fiske Harrison was, according to The Times, a "skilled and fearless skier" who died in a skiing accident in Zermatt, Switzerland in 1988.

He was educated at Eton and the University of Oxford, followed by The London School of Economics and Political Science and the University of London. He studied biological sciences and philosophy, as undergraduate and postgraduate and is presently studying neuroscience at King's College London.

He also trained at the Method acting school, the Stella Adler Conservatory in New York City, when Marlon Brando was its chairman.

Fiske-Harrison received the Boisedale Life Davidoff Bon Viveur of the Year award at the 2024 luncheon.

He is half owner of the only thoroughbred stallion in professional polo today and its top sire, Elstar, and he split a share in the racehorse Romany King with schoolfriend the Marquess of Stafford.

== Journalism ==
Fiske-Harrison has written for newspapers and magazines including The Times, Financial Times, The Daily Telegraph, The Times Literary Supplement, GQ, The Spectator, and Prospect, and has been himself featured in the society pages of the Telegraph, Evening Standard and Condé Nast's Tatler.

He has been interviewed and provided commentary on broadcast media outlets including the BBC, CNN, Al-Jazeera, US National Public Radio. and the Australian Broadcasting Corporation National Radio.

He has also written in Spanish for El Norte de Castilla and has been himself featured in the society pages of ABC.

== Naturalist and conservationist ==
Fiske-Harrison has written on wolves and dogs, cattle and horses. He often focuses on human perception of, and interaction with, animals.

=== Wolves ===
In September 2025 it was announced he was working on a book on wolves in the United States, collaborating with fine art photographer David Yarrow.

== Spain ==
=== Bullfighting ===
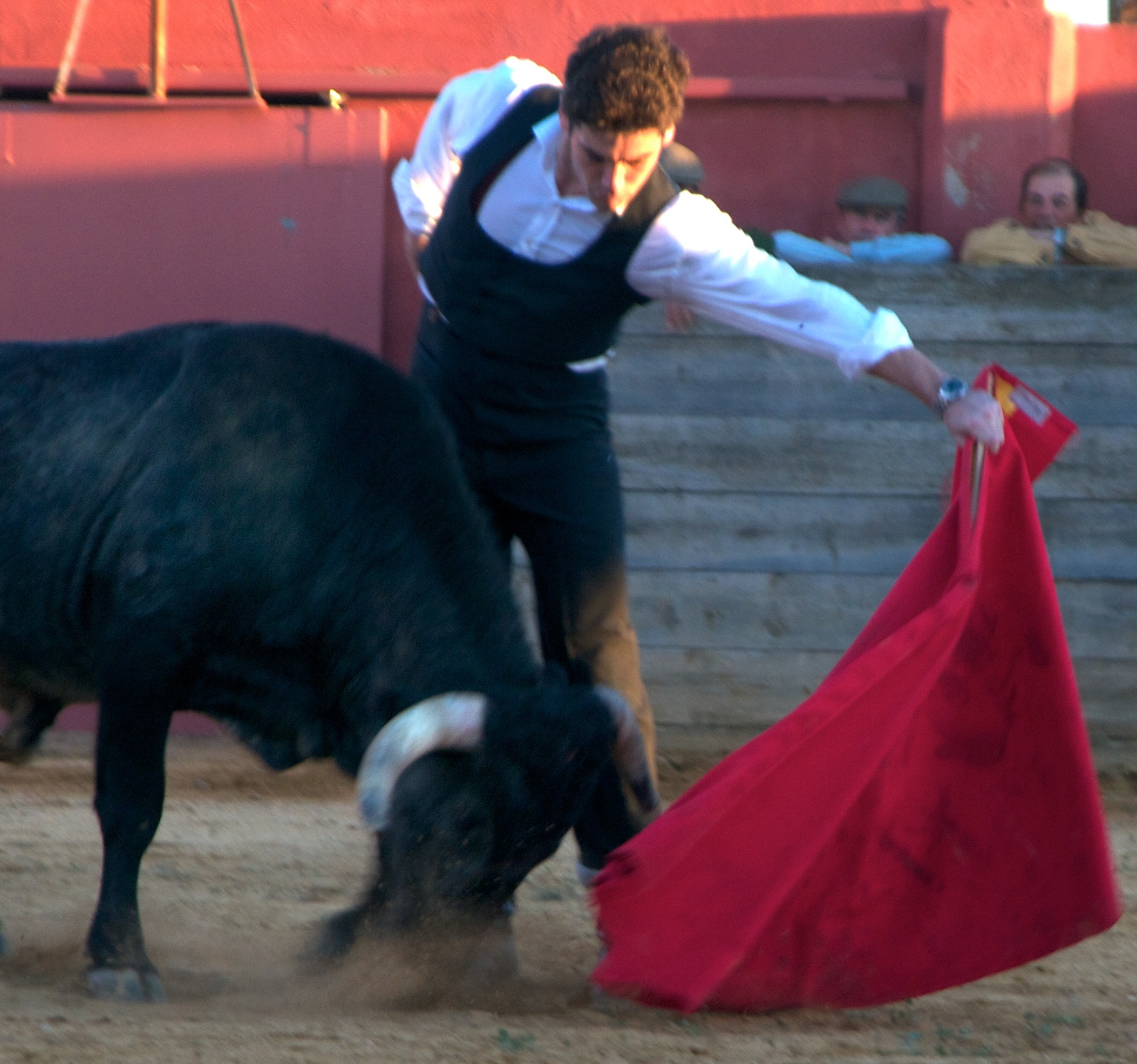
Fiske-Harrison toreando, 'bullfighting', in Palma del Río, Córdoba province, Spain

An essay on bullfighting for Prospect magazine in September 2008 led Fiske-Harrison to move to Spain to further research the topic. He lived, trained and fought alongside matadors including Juan José Padilla, Cayetano Rivera Ordóñez – whose father Paquirri was killed in the ring, and grandfather Antonio Ordóñez the subject of Hemingway's The Dangerous Summer – and Eduardo Dávila Miura of the Miura bull family. He wrote about his experiences on his blog The Last Arena: In Search of the Spanish Bullfight.

==== Into The Arena: The World Of The Spanish Bullfight ====
In 2011, Profile Books published his Into The Arena: The World of the Spanish Bullfight. The Sunday Times said that "it provides an engrossing introduction to Spain's 'great feast of art and danger'".

=== Bull-running ===
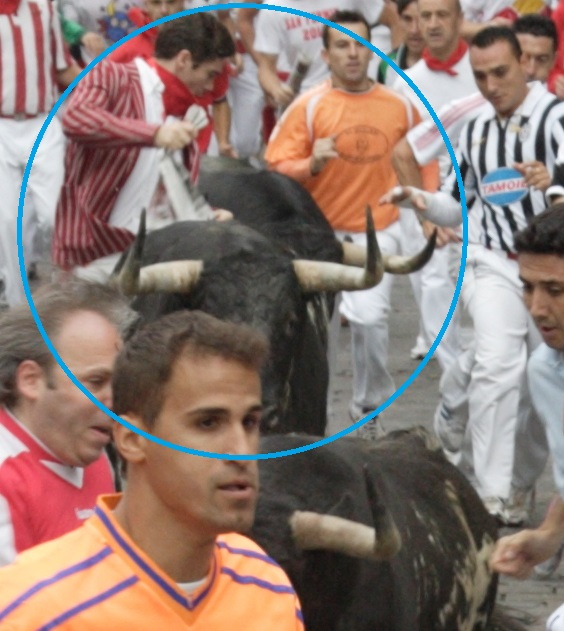
Fiske-Harrison, circled, running among the bulls of Torrestrella on calle Estafeta in Pamplona

As part of his research in 2009, Fiske-Harrison began running with the bulls in Pamplona, and became a part of the 'Runners Team of the World'. and the ancient castle of Cuéllar in Old Castile, which hosts the oldest encierro in Spain, and where he was awarded a prize for writing about the encierros in 2013.

==== The Bulls Of Pamplona ====
In Spring 2014 Fiske-Harrison co-authored and edited the book The Bulls Of Pamplona, with a foreword from the Mayor of Pamplona and contributions from aficionados of the festival of San Fermín, including John Hemingway, grandson of Ernest Hemingway, Beatrice Welles, daughter of Orson Welles, along with chapters of advice from the most experienced American and Spanish bull-runners.

== Drama ==
Fiske-Harrison's acting debut was as Govianus in The Second Maiden's Tragedy at the Hackney Empire theatre in London. He has also acted on the German stage and in independent film in the UK and Italy. He returned to acting in 2023 in The Honourable Way Out, a Cold War spy thriller produced by the British Forces Broadcasting Service (BFBS).

=== The Pendulum ===
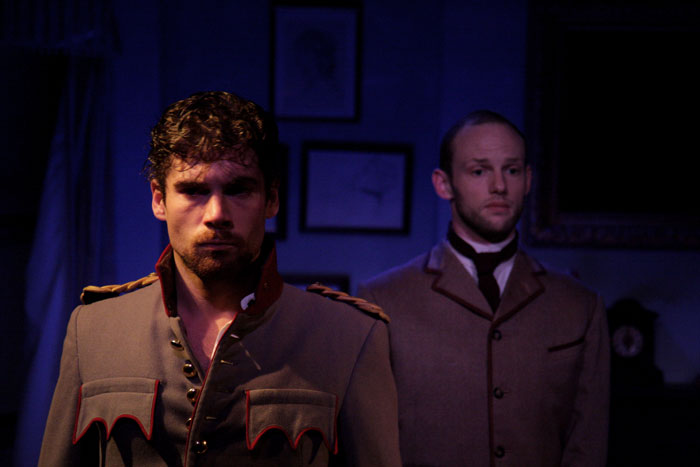
Fiske-Harrison and Gareth Kennerly on stage in the West End of London in 2008

The play is a two-act four-hander set in 1900 Vienna. Its first production was in the summer of 2008 at the Jermyn Street Theatre, in London's West End.

Michael Billington in The Guardian gave it three stars and said, "the author himself plays the disintegrating hero with the right poker-backed irascibility... it is refreshing to find a new play that gets away from bedsit angst, one comes away with the sensation of having seen an accomplished historical play." The Sunday Times described it as "something earnest, nicely acted – if a little contained."
