= Easthorpe, Essex =

Village in Essex, United Kingdom

Coordinates: 51.85°N 00.77°E

Easthorpe
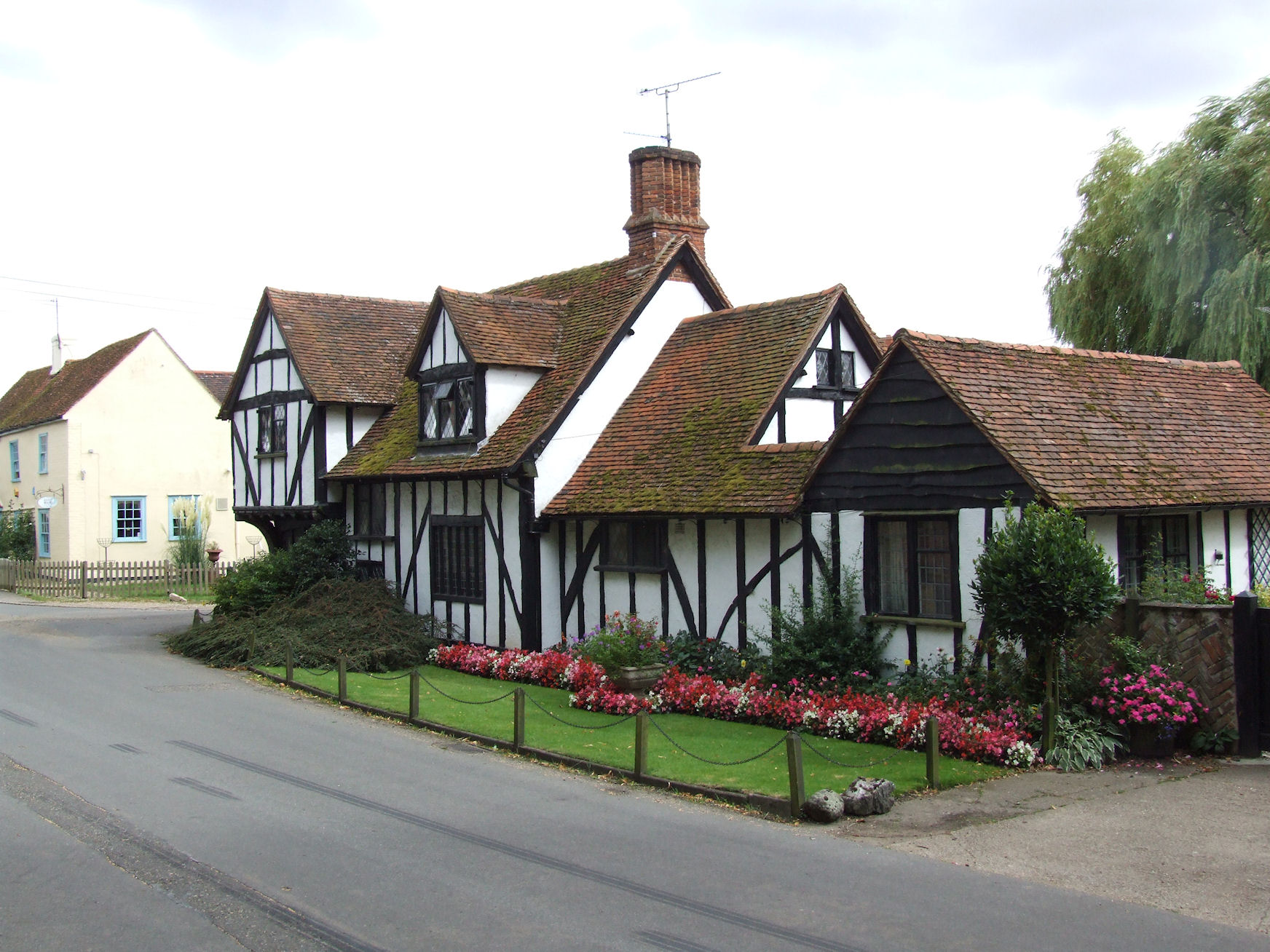
- Cottage in Easthorpe

- Location within Essex
- Civil parish: Copford
- District: Colchester
- Shire county: Essex
- Region: East
- Country: England
- Sovereign state: United Kingdom
- Post town: Colchester
- Postcode district: CO5

Easthorpe is a small village in the civil parish of Copford, in the City of Colchester district of Essex, England. Easthorpe is on an old Roman road. Nearby settlements include Colchester and the villages of Marks Tey, Copford and Copford Green. The main A12 road and Marks Tey railway station are nearby.

Easthorpe was an ancient parish. The parish was abolished in 1949 and its area absorbed into the neighbouring parish of Copford, subject to some adjustments to the boundaries with the neighbouring parishes of Marks Tey and Messing-cum-Inworth. At the 1931 census (the last before the abolition of the civil parish), Easthorpe had a population of 113.

== Notable buildings ==
- St Mary's Church
- Easthorpe Hall
- Well Cottage
- St Mary's Grange

== Notable people ==
- Caroline Maria Applebee (c. 1785–1854), watercolour artist

== Natural features ==
- Domsey Brook
