= Copford Green =

Hamlet in Essex, England

Coordinates: 51.868251°N 0.799985°E

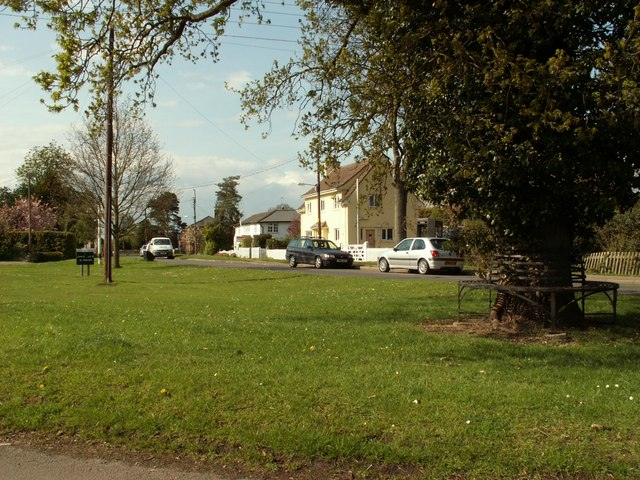
- The green at Copford Green

- Location within Essex
- OS grid reference: TL9274722607
- Civil parish: Copford
- District: Colchester
- Shire county: Essex
- Region: East
- Country: England
- Sovereign state: United Kingdom
- Post town: Colchester
- Postcode district: CO6
- Dialling code: 01206
- Police: Essex
- Fire: Essex
- Ambulance: East of England
- UK Parliament: North Essex

Copford Green is a hamlet within the civil parish of Copford and the district of Colchester in Essex, England. It is near the A12 and A120 roads, and is 3 kilometres (2 mi) south west of Colchester.

The parish church of St Michael's & All Angels, with sections dating back as far as 1130, is adjacent to Copford Green, as is the manorial house of Copford Hall.
