= Copford Place =

Building in Copford, Essex, England

Coordinates: 51.8815°N 0.8059°E

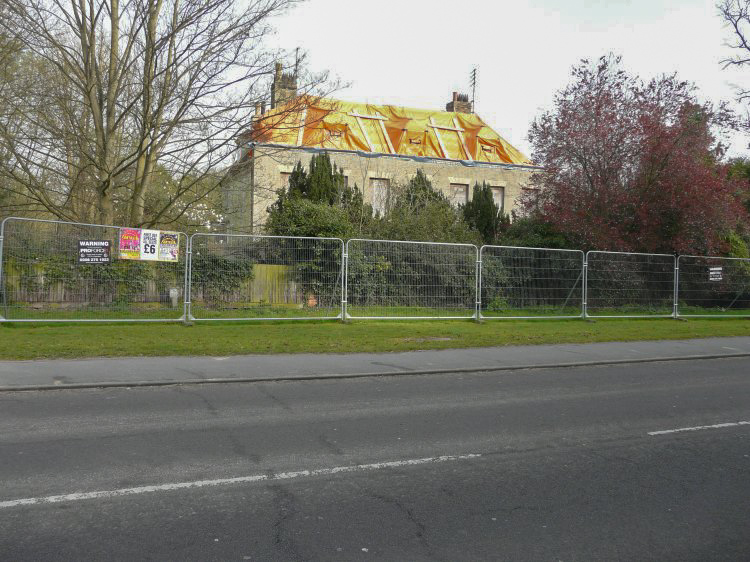
Pictured in 2014

Copford Place is a grade II listed building in Copford, Essex, England. It dates to the 17th or 18th century and is two storeys in height. During the Second World War it was used as part of a prisoner of war camp for Italians. After the war Copford Place was converted to a retirement home and housed the painter Tirzah Garwood. It was converted to flats in 1998 but fell empty when building regulations meant it could not continue in this role. In 2020 an application was made to convert Copford Place into flats and erect additional houses in its grounds. The building was badly damaged by arson in November 2024, the same month a decision was due to be made on the application.

== History ==
The site was owned by the Forde family in the 14th century but came into ownership of the Manor of Copford, who leased it out. English Heritage record the current structure as being built in the 18th century and the Pevsner Architectural Guides state it was erected in the late 17th century. A timber-framed structure with a plastered exterior, around 1800 the building was refaced in Gault clay bricks. Later in that century a large porch was added; originally open in nature and supported by Doric columns, the gaps between the columns were later infilled.

By the time of the Second World War Copford Place was occupied by a tenant, Mrs Laws. The adjacent fields were used as a camp to house Italian prisoners of war, who were fed from a kitchen in the house. Laws granted permission for the Women's Institute to use the house to produce jam and preserves. In 1947 the house was purchased by Susannah Sharp who converted it into a retirement home for "gentlefolk". In this role it was the last home of the painter Tirzah Garwood (1908-1951), who was dying of cancer. Some of Garwood's last works were paintings of the house's gardens.

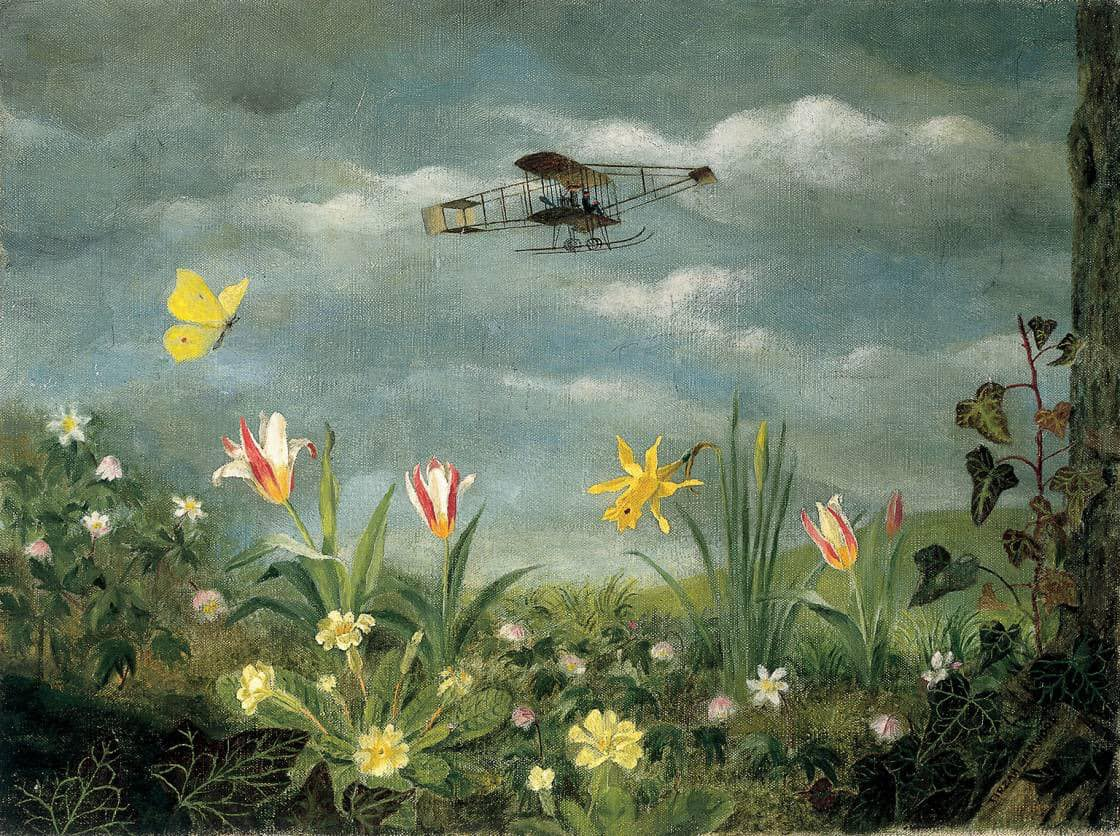
A 1950 painting by Garwood

By the 1950s Copford House was used as a home for "distressed women". The house was granted statutory protection as a grade II listed building on 7 April 1965. At time of its listing English Heritage noted that the interior retained some 18th-century details. Sharp died in 1977 and in 1980 the house passed to the charity Help the Aged, who used it as a care home. A replacement care home, New Copford Place, was constructed to the rear of the property. Copford Place was converted into flats in 1998 but these fell vacant when changes to regulations left them non-compliant. The site was empty for many years and by 2024 was covered in scaffolding and sheeting, awaiting redevelopment, and was placed on the Heritage at Risk Register. A planning application was made on 14 May 2020 to redevelop the house into eight flats, convert the stable into a house and construct a further 28 houses in the grounds. A decision on the application was due to be made by Colchester City Council by the end of November 2024.

At 8.45 pm on 18 November 2024 Copford Place was reported to be on fire. Four fire crews attended but were unable to enter the building due to its poor structural condition. The fire was extinguished by midnight but not before the structure was badly damaged and left open to the elements. An investigation ruled that the fire had been deliberately set. The planning application for the site was withdrawn by the applicant on 5 February 2025.

== Description ==
The main building is L-shaped in plan and two storeys in height, with an additional attic and cellar. The south and east elevations had grey gault brick parapets. The hipped roof had plain red tiles, with three dormers on the east side and two on the west, one of which had a leaded casement window dating to around 1700. The east elevation is of five bays with sash windows. the south elevation, facing London Road, is of seven bays, again with sash windows except the central bay which has a blank window. The chimney pots were in Coade stone.
