= Tirzah Garwood =

English painter

- Born: Eileen Lucy Garwood; 11 April 1908; Gillingham, England
- Died: 27 March 1951 (aged 42); Colchester, England
- Occupations: Artist and engraver
- Spouses: Eric Ravilious (m. 1930; died 1942) Henry Swanzy (m. 1946)
- Children: 3

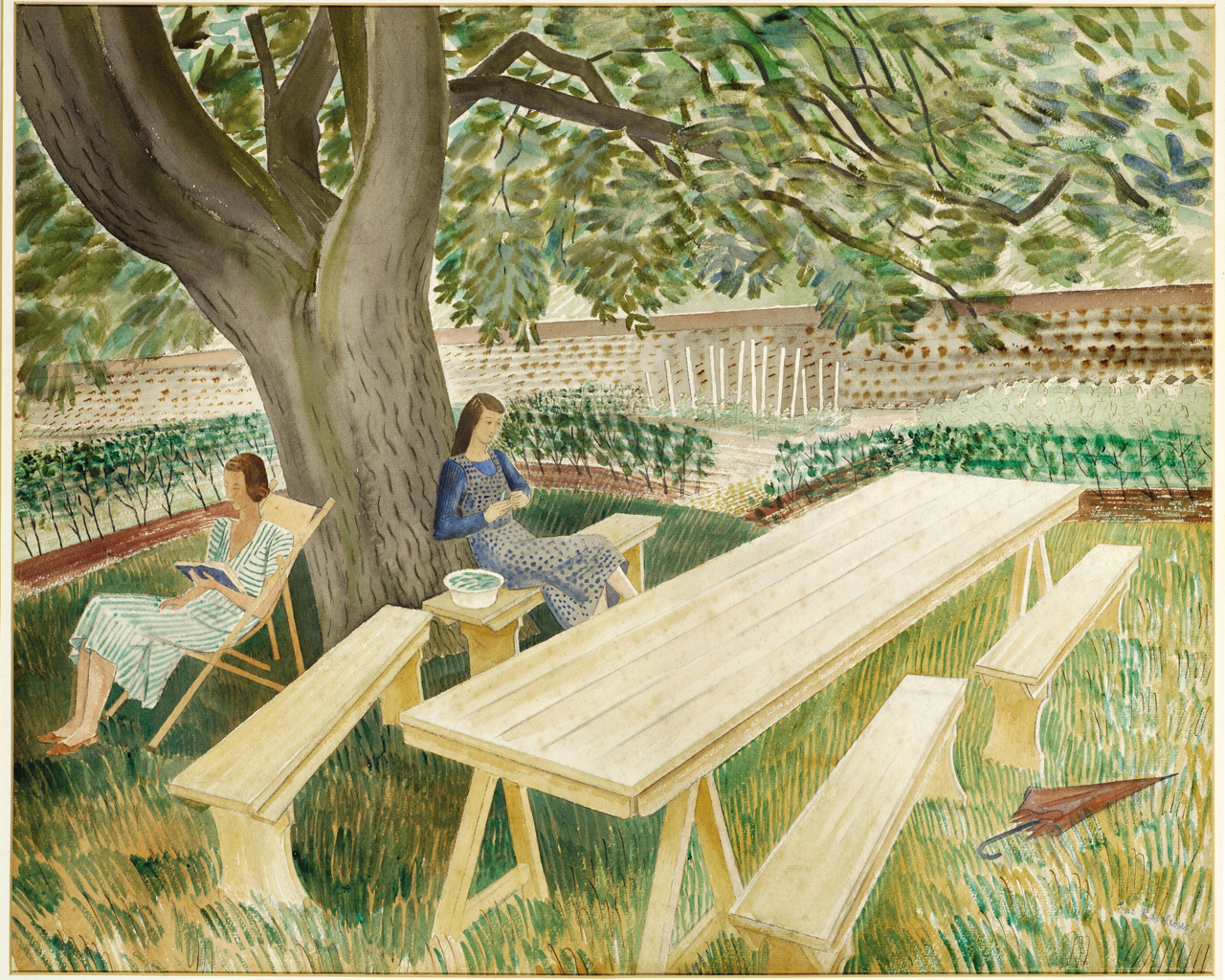
Two Women in a Garden: Garwood (right) and Charlotte Bawden, by Eric Ravilious.

Eileen Lucy "Tirzah" Garwood (11 April 1908 – 27 March 1951) was a British wood-engraver, painter, paper marbler, author, and a member of the Great Bardfield Artists.

According to Brighton & Hove Museums, Garwood "is one of the most original and distinctive figures of twentieth century British art." Her work is known for depicting people, places and animals in domestic scenes "caught in a fleeting moment". Her style is praised for its touches of humour and eccentricity.

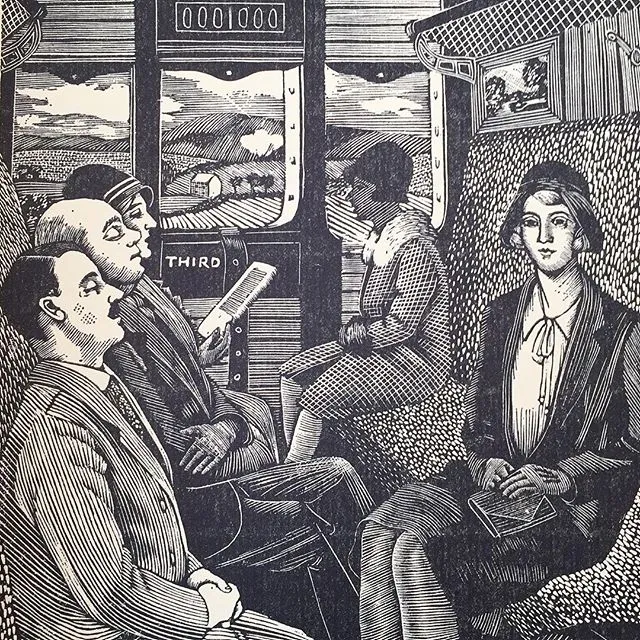
Tirzah Garwood - The Train Journey - 1939

Garwood was married to the artist Eric Ravilious. They collaborated on some projects together, most notably the mural at the Midland Hotel, Morecambe. Garwood's autobiography was titled 'Long Live Great Bardfield & Love to You All'.

During her time with the Great Bardfield Artists, Garwood worked with Charlotte Bawden in creating exquisite marbled papers, some of which are now in the Victoria and Albert Museum in London.

== Early life and education ==
Garwood was born in 1908 in Gillingham, Kent, the third of five children born to Ella Agnes (née Corry) (1872–1952) and Frederick Scott Garwood (1872–1944) an officer in the Royal Engineers. Her name "Tirzah" was bestowed by her siblings, a reference to Tirzah in the Book of Numbers in the Bible, and possibly a corruption of a reference by her grandmother to "Little Tertia", that is, the third child. She and her family accompanied her father on army postings to Croydon, Littlehampton and then Eastbourne.

Garwood was educated at West Hill School in Eastbourne from 1920 to 1924, and then at Eastbourne School of Art from 1925, under Reeves Fawkes, Oliver Senior and, as a wood engraver, Eric Ravilious. Her father recorded the date of her first engraving, 24 November 1926, in his diary. Garwood moved to Kensington in 1928 and later studied at the Central School of Art.

Curator of the Towner Gallery, Andy Friends states that Garwood's student work as a wood-engraving shows "evidence of how, in a difficult art, Tirzah almost instantly became an adept peer of her already accomplished teacher – and during 1927 began to exert an influence over his own approach."

== Wood-engravings ==
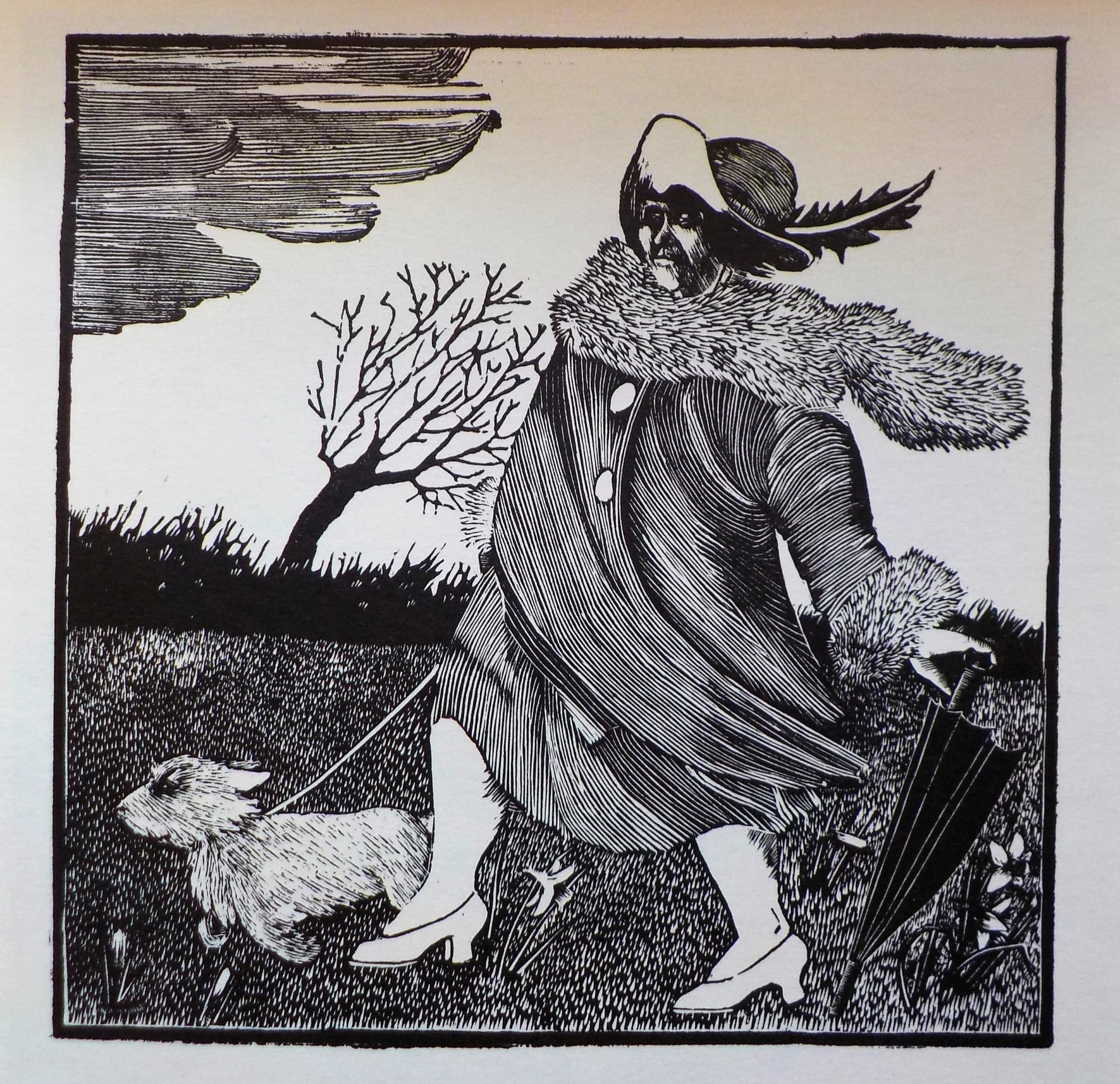
Tirzah Garwood - March - 1927

One of Garwood's early woodcuts, shown at the Society of Wood Engravers' annual exhibition in 1927, was praised in The Times. The same year, the Redfern Gallery, in London showed The Four Seasons, a series of Garwood's engravings.

She undertook commissions for the Kynoch Press and for the BBC, for whom she produced a new rendering of their coat-of-arms. In 1928 Garwood illustrated Granville Bantock's oratorio The Pilgrim's Progress, which he wrote as a BBC commission.

In the late 1920s, when wood engravings were widely popular, Garwood was recognised as one of the most promising, skilled, and innovative artists of that era. Her wood-engraving work was highly praised for its intricacy, humour and a hint of eccentricity.

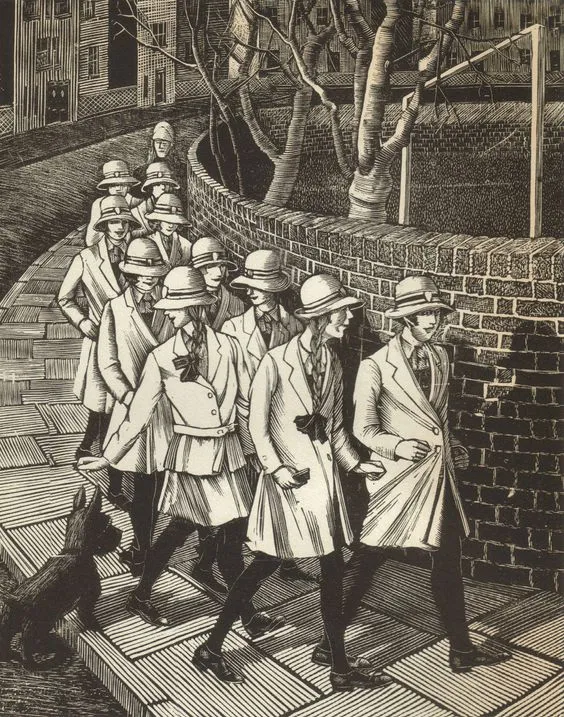
Tirzah Garwood - The Crocodile - 1929

== Life with Eric Ravilious ==
Garwood married Eric Ravilious in Kensington on 5 July 1930. Between 1930 and 1932 the couple lived in Hammersmith, London, where there is a blue plaque on the wall of their house at the corner of Upper Mall and Weltje Road. In 1931 they moved to rural Essex where they initially lodged with Edward Bawden and his wife Charlotte at Great Bardfield. In 1933 they painted murals at the Midland Hotel in Morecambe.

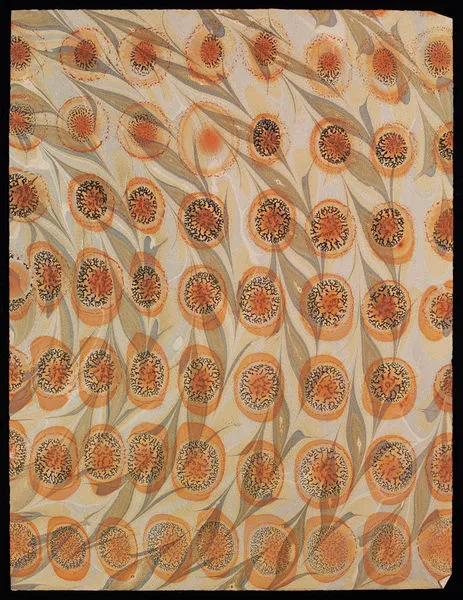
Tirzah Garwood - marbling

During this time with the Great Bardfield Artists, Garwood was inspired by Charlotte Bawden to experiment with marbled paper. She created exquisite repeated designs which were used for lampshades and books. Garwood's marbling work was known for ethereal designs and natural dream-like forms and is currently held at the Victoria and Albert museum in London.

In 1934 they purchased Bank House at Castle Hedingham, in Essex, and a blue plaque now commemorates this. They had three children: John Ravilious (1935–2014); the photographer James Ravilious (1939–1999); and Anne Ullmann (b. 1941), editor of books on her parents and their work. After Anne was born in April 1941, the family moved out of the often cold, and sometimes flooded, Bank House to Ironbridge Farm near Shalford, Essex. She was painted by Ravilious, in Two Women in a Garden (1932), alongside Charlotte Bawden.

During the winter of 1941 Garwood became ill; she was diagnosed with breast cancer and underwent emergency mastectomy surgery in March 1942. She wrote her autobiography from March and May 1942, while recovering from the surgery. Originally intended only for her family, the autobiography, Long Live Great Bardfield & Love to You All, was published posthumously, in 2012, after being edited by her daughter Anne.

While he was travelling for a commission from the War Artists' Advisory Committee, Eric Ravilious's plane went missing off Iceland; it was later determined that he died in a plane crash on 2 September 1942. His body was never recovered. The government proved reluctant to pay Garwood the widow's pension she was due or to settle Ravilious's outstanding pay for over a year.

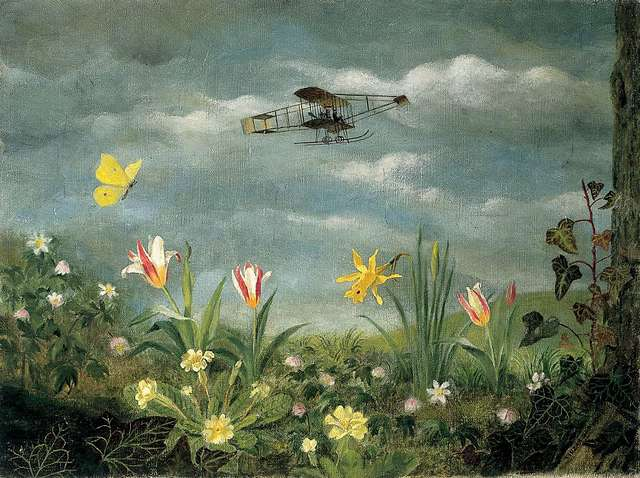
Tirzah Garwood - Springtime of Flight - 1950

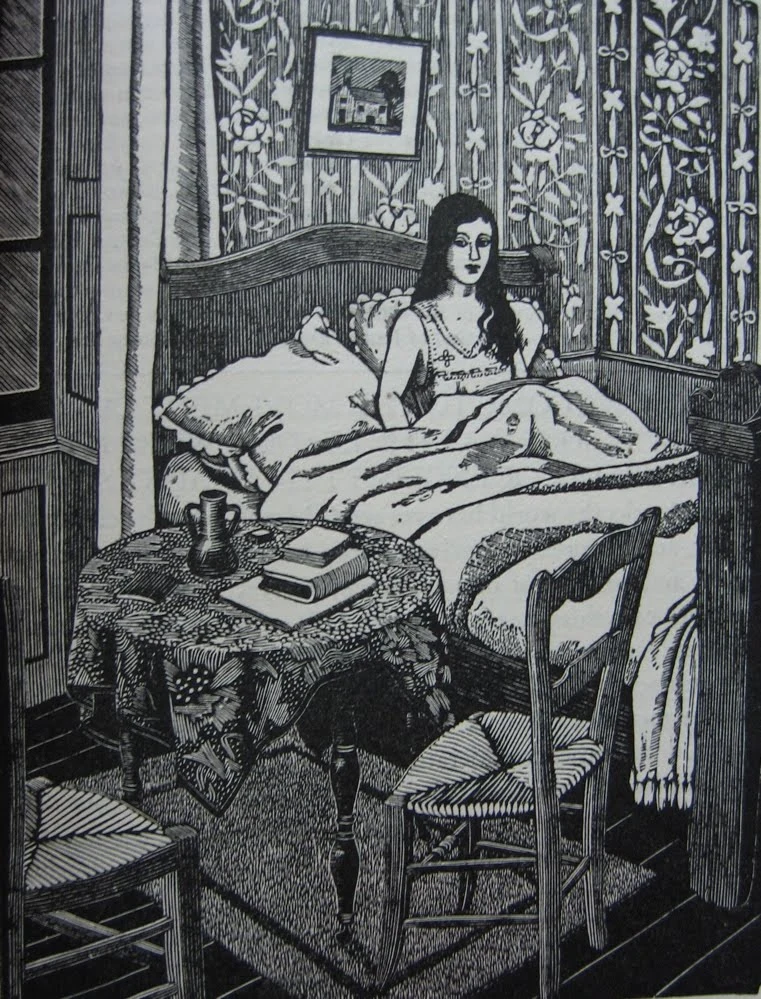
Tirzah Garwood - The Wife - 1929

== Later life and oil paintings ==
Garwood left Ironbridge Farm in March 1944, and moved with her children to Boydells Farm, near Wethersfield, Essex. She began painting in oils and resumed her career as an artist. These were some of the most productive years of her life as an artist. Her oil paintings depict natural scenes of birds and insects that are otherworldly and enchanting in jewel-like colour schemes.

Garwood met the Anglo-Irish radio producer Henry Swanzy in 1944, and they were married in March 1946. They lived in Hampstead.

She was again diagnosed with cancer in early 1948, and lived in a nursing home near Colchester from 1950, where she died in 1951. She was buried in Copford.

Tirzah Garwood's daughter, Anne Ullman wrote, "During the last year of Tirzah's life, sometimes in bed and often in pain, relieved by deep ray therapy and testosterone, Tirzah completed no less than twenty small oil paintings." A family friend, Olive Cook, recalls how Garwood astounded her friends during this time period with her determination, joy, and courage in what Garwood said was "the happiest year of her life".

== Autobiography ==
Garwood's autobiography, Long Live Great Bardfield & Love to You All, was written in free moments in 1942 while Garwood was recovering from an emergency mastectomy due to breast cancer. The memoir was edited and published in 2012 by her daughter, Anne Ullmann. It was originally meant to be a private memoir for her family.

According to Robert Radford of Cassone, the International Online Magazine of Art and Art Books, "[Garwood's autobiography's] principal value is the light that it shines on the situation of a young female artist during the middle decades of the 20th century, contending with issues of self-confidence as an artist, the emerging awareness of the tyranny of society's expectations of women but also the sense that hers was a generation and a milieu from which radical transformations in behaviour could be expected."

== Commemoration and legacy ==
A memorial exhibition was held at the Towner Gallery in Eastbourne in 1952. Two of her paintings are in the Towner Gallery, which also has the largest collection of Ravilious' work. Both also have works in the Fry Art Gallery in Saffron Walden. One of her prints is held by the Victoria & Albert Museum in London.

From 19 November 2024 to 26 May 2025, the Dulwich Picture Gallery held the first major retrospective of Garwood's work.

The last house where Garwood lived, the eighteenth-century Grade II listed Copford Place in Copford near Colchester, was destroyed in a deliberate fire in November 2024. There were proposals to convert it into flats and houses. It had been empty and surrounded by scaffolding for some time.

== Bibliography ==
- —— (2012). Long Live Great Bardfield & Love to You All: The Autobiography of Tirzah Garwood 1908–43. Simon Lawrence-Fleece Press. ISBN 978-0-948375-95-8.
- Lotte Crawford, Tirzah Garwood, Eiderdown Books (2023) ISBN 978-1-9160416-7-7
