= Domsey Brook =

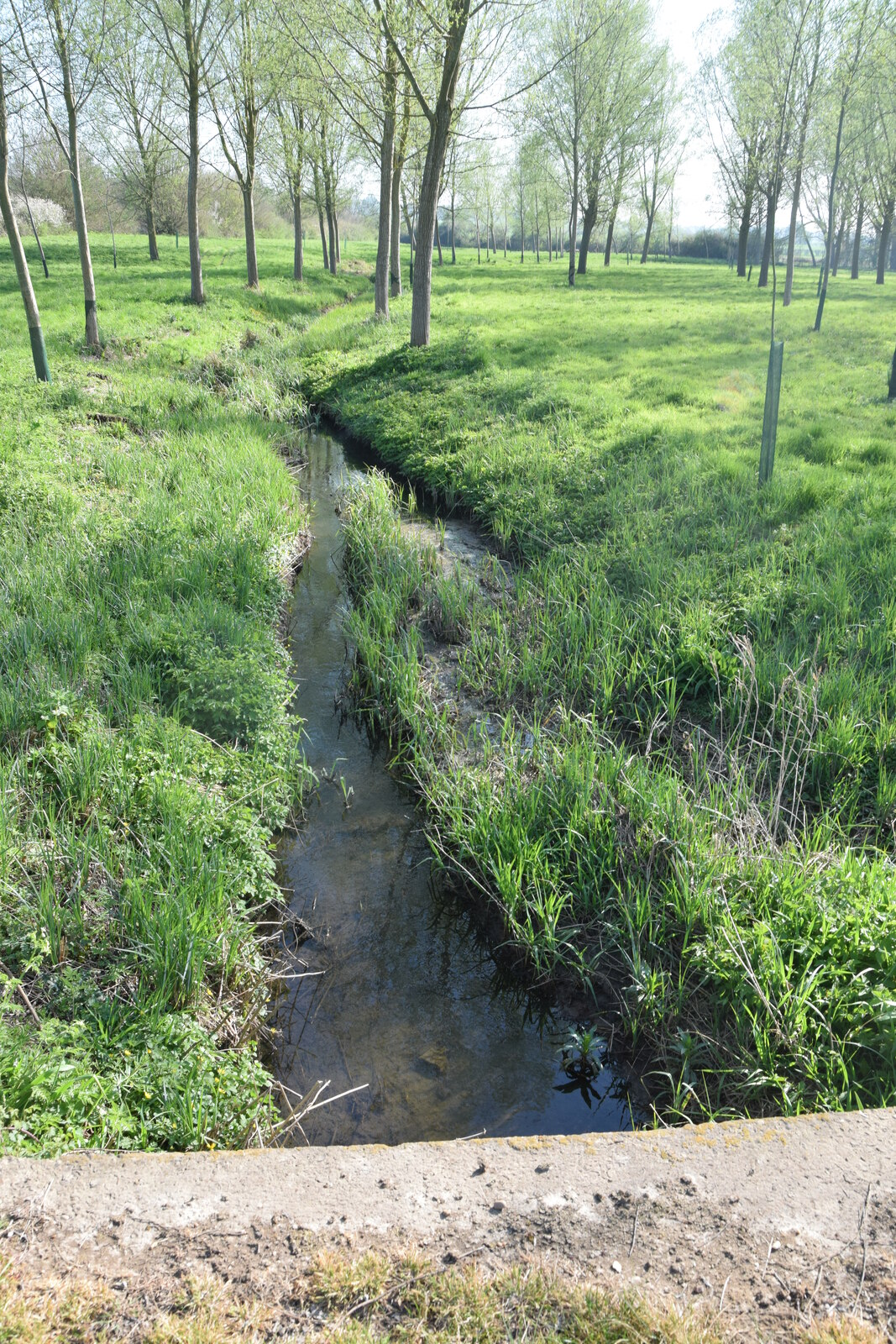
- The brook viewed from a footbridge

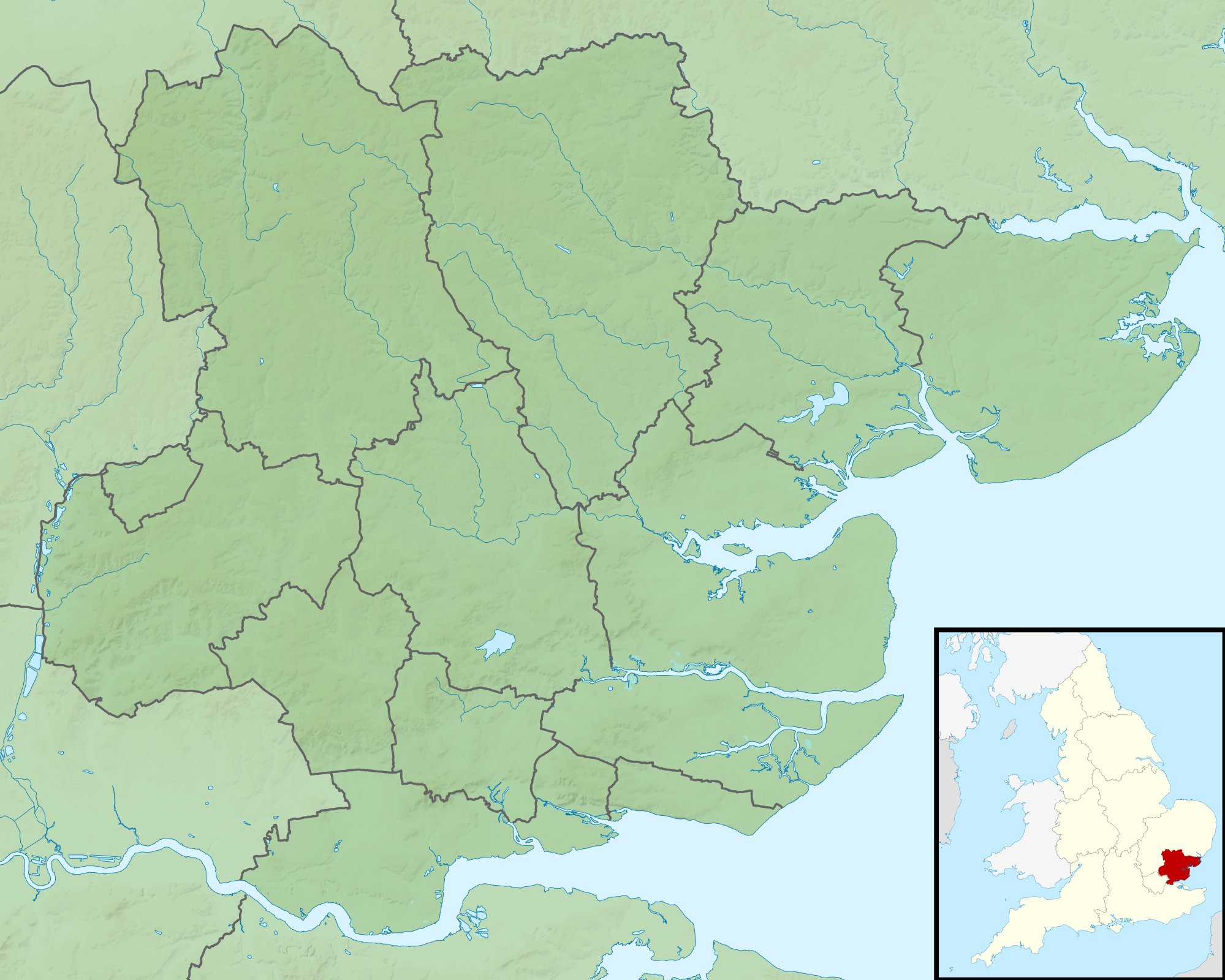
- Location in Essex

Location
- Country: England

Physical characteristics
- Source
  - location: Essex
- Mouth: River Blackwater
  - coordinates: 51°50′12″N 0°42′35″E
- Length: 7.274 km (4.520 mi)

Domsey Brook is a stream in Essex, England, a tributary of the River Blackwater within the Blackwater Operational Catchment. The brook flows through rural areas of Essex near villages such as Feering, Easthorpe and Messing. The brook also contains vulnerable plants.
