= Caroline Maria Applebee =

English artist

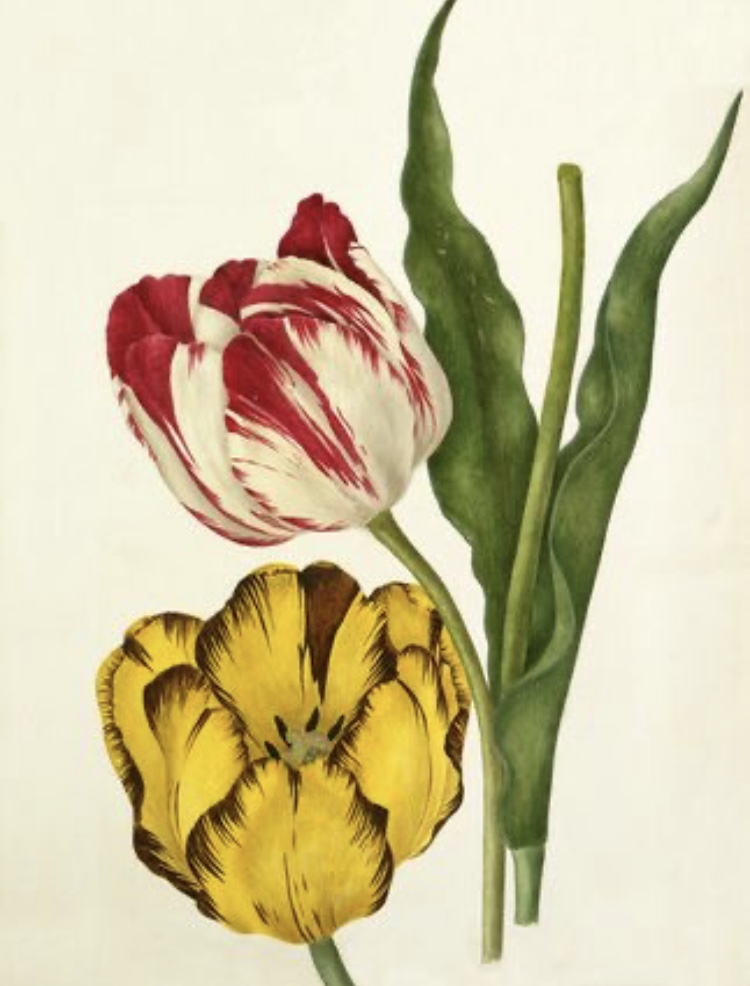
Caroline Maria Applebee, Tulips

Caroline Maria Applebee (c. 1786 – 16 September 1854) was an English artist, mostly in watercolour.

Born in London, but baptized at St Margaret's Church, Canterbury, on 16 May 1787, Caroline Maria Applebee was the eldest daughter of the Rev. John Applebee, a Church of England clergyman, by his marriage to Grace Lukyn. She never married and spent most of her life in and around Colchester. A graduate of St John's College, Oxford, her father was appointed a Prebendary of Lincoln in 1795 and the next year became Rector of Easthorpe, Essex, which brought the Applebee family to Colchester when Caroline Maria was about eleven. Her father died in 1825, aged 69.

Applebee was a friend of Charles Lamb, who addressed an acrostic to her which was first published in 1830. In 1834 she was a subscriber to the publication of Two Lectures on Taste, by Dr James Carter, in 1838 to the publication of a new translation of three plays by Lessing, and in 1841 to Emily Elizabeth Willement's A Bouquet from Flora's Garden. In 1841 and 1851 Applebee was recorded as living at 53, Crouch Street, Colchester, with several servants. In 1851 her rank or profession was stated as "Lady of merit".

Applebee's work features a wide variety of plants known in the 19th century, especially rare and exotic ones. Some 323 of her watercolour paintings and drawings are in the Royal Horticultural Society's Lindley Library. She benefited greatly from the botanical gardens which for much of her life were at the top of East Hill, Colchester, but in 1852, two years before her death, they were developed for new housing.

In April 1851, Applebee was living at 53, Crouch Street, Colchester, with four female servants and with a visitor, Mary Bullock. She stated her age as 65 and her place of birth as London. She died at Blackheath on 16 September 1854, aged 69, and was buried in the churchyard of St Mary at the Walls, Colchester. In her will, she left houses, diamonds, carriages, and a painting said to be by Velazquez, as well as three albums of her flower drawings, the last going to her niece Louisa Clare Williams, later Mrs Turner. The three albums were sold separately to the Royal Horticultural Society, one of them by a Mrs M. Sugden, believed to have been Louisa's daughter, Maud. Maud Turner married William Sugden in Colchester in 1882.

Applebee’s work was almost unknown until the invention of mass colour printing in the second half of the 20th century and is now used mostly to illustrate diaries and books about plants.
