= St Michael and All Angels Church, Copford =

Church in Copford, Essex

St Michael and All Angels Church
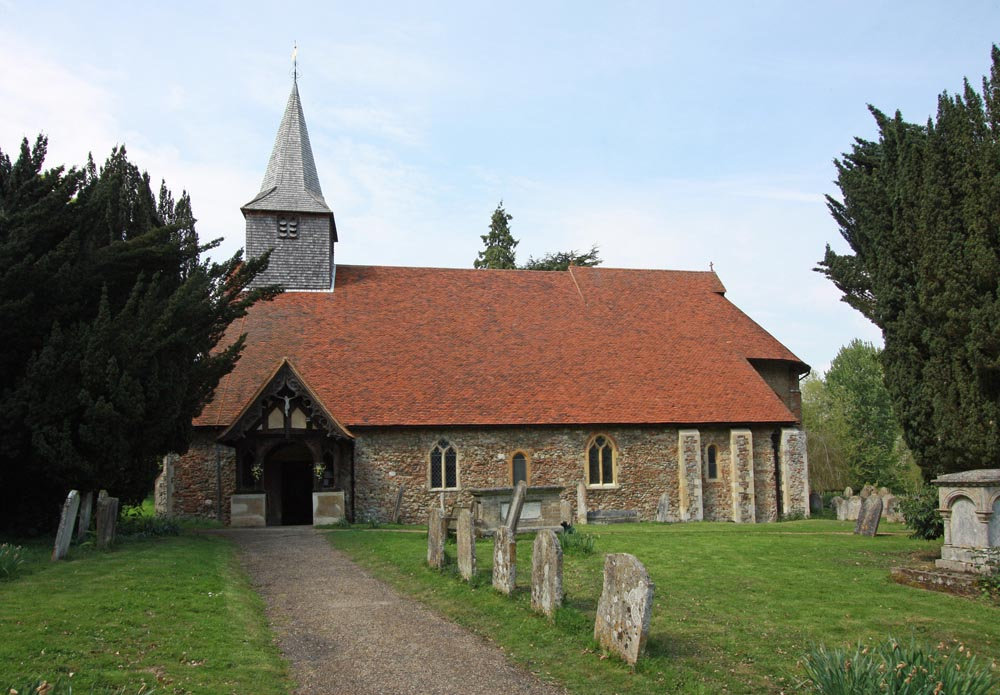
- St Michael and All Angels Church, Copford
- St Michael and All Angels Church
- 51.869507°N 0.80919°E
- Location: Copford, Essex
- Country: England
- Denomination: Anglican

Architecture
- Heritage designation: Grade I

Administration
- Diocese: Chelmsford
- Archdeaconry: Colchester
- Deanery: Witham

The Church of St Michael and All Angels, Copford is a 12th-century parish church located near the small village of Copford, Essex. It most likely served as a chapel to nearby Copford Hall, once owned by the bishops of London. The church is widely recognized for its outstanding collection of 12th-century Norman wall paintings, use of Roman brick and semi-circular Romanesque apse. It is a Grade I listed building.

== Description ==
=== Structure ===
The original Norman church was built sometime after 1130 AD. It originally consisted of an early 12th-century semi-circular chancel and apse with a semi-dome stone vault and 3-bay vaulted nave. In the late 13th or early 14th century, a South aisle was added. The south wall contains four arches: one late 12th-century, one late 13th-century, a possible 14th-century arch and a modern arch. Later expansions include the South porch which was reconstructed in the 20th century and timber belfry with spire. The walls were originally built of coursed rubble with both Roman and medieval bricks and uncoursed rubble on the south side of the church. Much of the original building survives today, especially in the apse with its original Norman vault. A remodelling of the church in the early 15th century replaced the original barrel vaulted nave with the current timber structure.

The Perpendicular rood screen "consists of five open divisions on each side of a four-centred central arch, and has a form of straightened reticulated tracery reminiscent of the late fourteenth century"; its cornice was restored in the 19th century. The western timber belfry, shingled in oak, was built in the late 14th century. Romanesque sculpture can be found surrounding the two North doorways, the nave and apse windows, on the apse arch and also on the original stone baptismal font. A round-headed window opening built from Roman bricks can be found on the west wall, which possibly provided access to an external balcony used for a pulpit or for relics display. The blocked north door holds several of its original hinges.

=== Wall paintings ===
The vaulted apse is decorated with a variety of religious themed wall paintings depicting Christ in a mandala surrounded by angels and apostles. The nave and chancel are extensively decorated with painted figures. The apse arch displays the signs of the zodiac, and several other walls display complex decorations, including flower and leaf patterns and scrollwork.

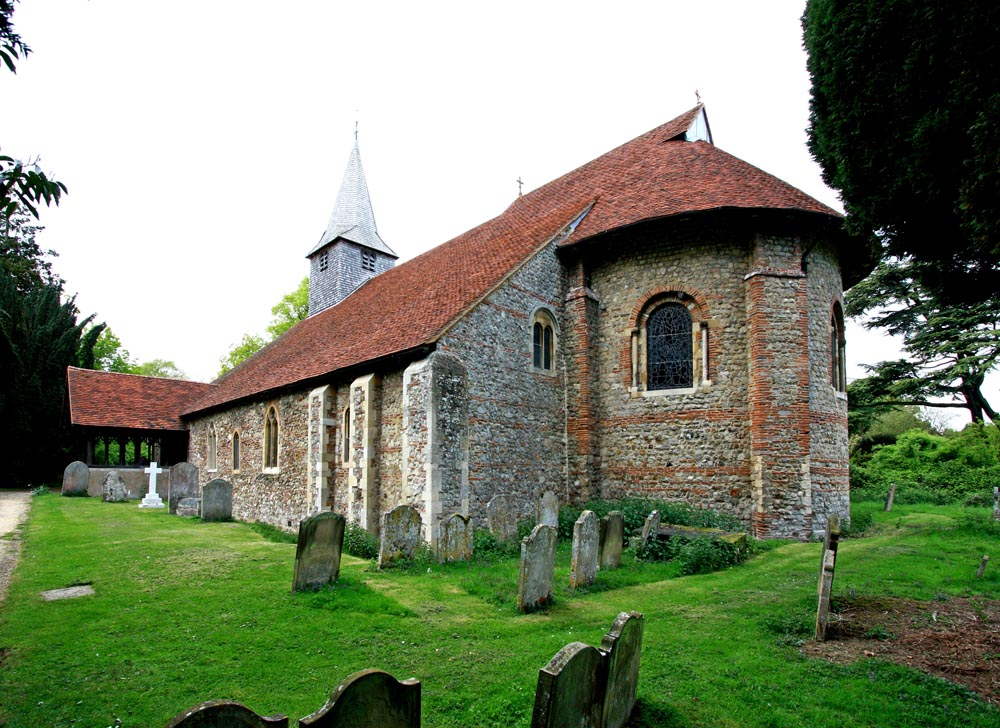
Exterior view of the apse

== History ==
In 995 AD the Bishops of London were granted Copford manor. During the Middle Ages, the bishops would use Copford manor as a centre to manage the diocese and often would perform ordinations here. The ownership of the estate, which later became known as Copford Hall, continued with the diocese until 1559, when Bishop Edmund Bonner was ordered to resign after the succession of Elizabeth I. The 12th-century church was possibly built to serve as a chapel to the Norman manor. It was initially dedicated to St Mary. Later, during the 19th century, it was renamed St Michael and All Angels.

The earliest wall paintings in British churches occurred after the Norman Conquest. The 12th-century walls of St Michael and All Angels church were probably painted at the time of construction with religious themed paintings. Following the Reformation, the walls were whitewashed to cover the art work; they were uncovered during the late 17th century and then re-covered with fresh whitewash. In 1871 the whitewash in the apse was removed and the wall paintings were uncovered and restored. The nave paintings were restored in 1879, and all the paintings were restored again in 1931–32, in the 1960s, and finally in the 1990s.

The Church of St Michael and All Angels was listed as Grade I in 1965.

== 12th-century wall paintings ==
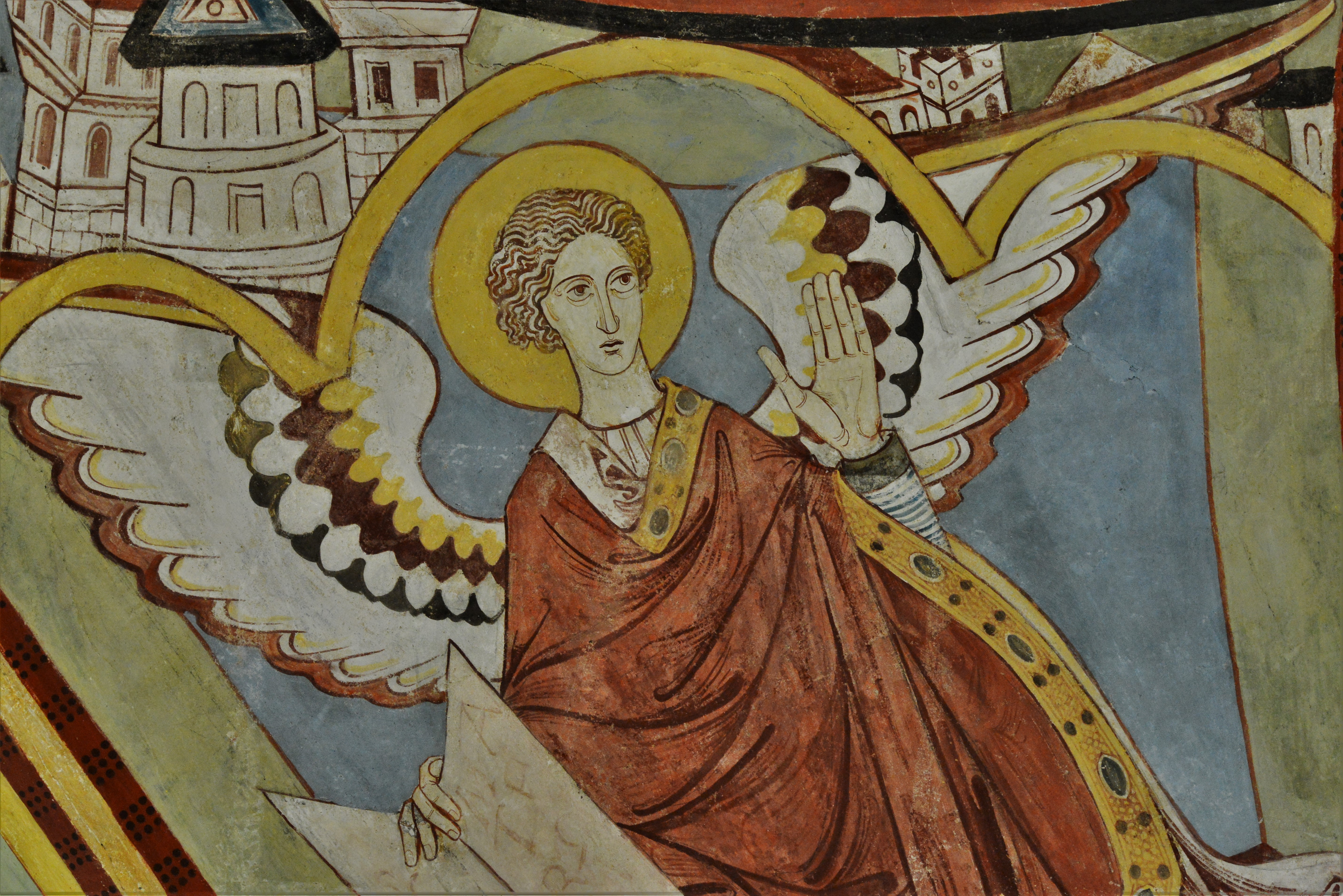

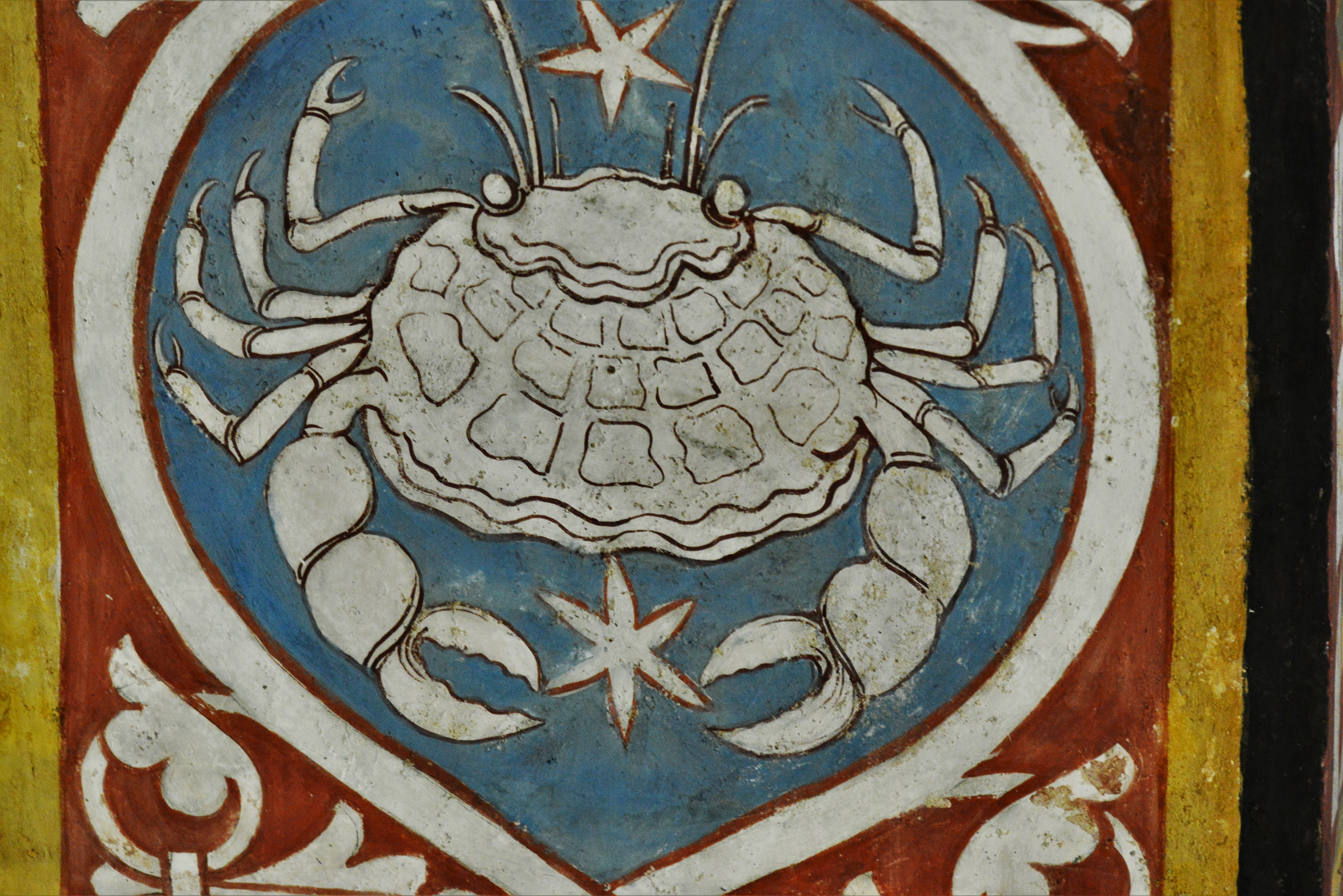

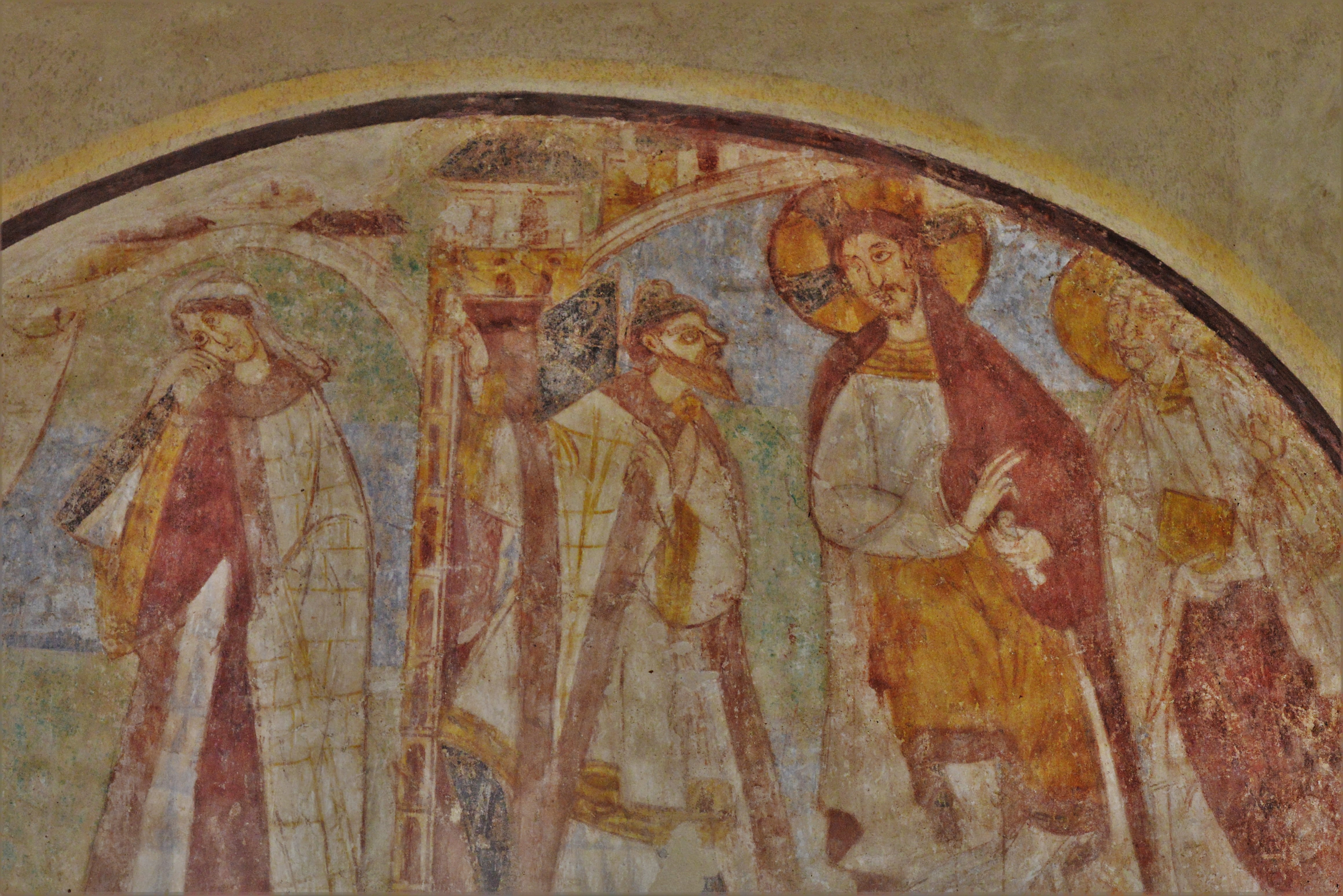

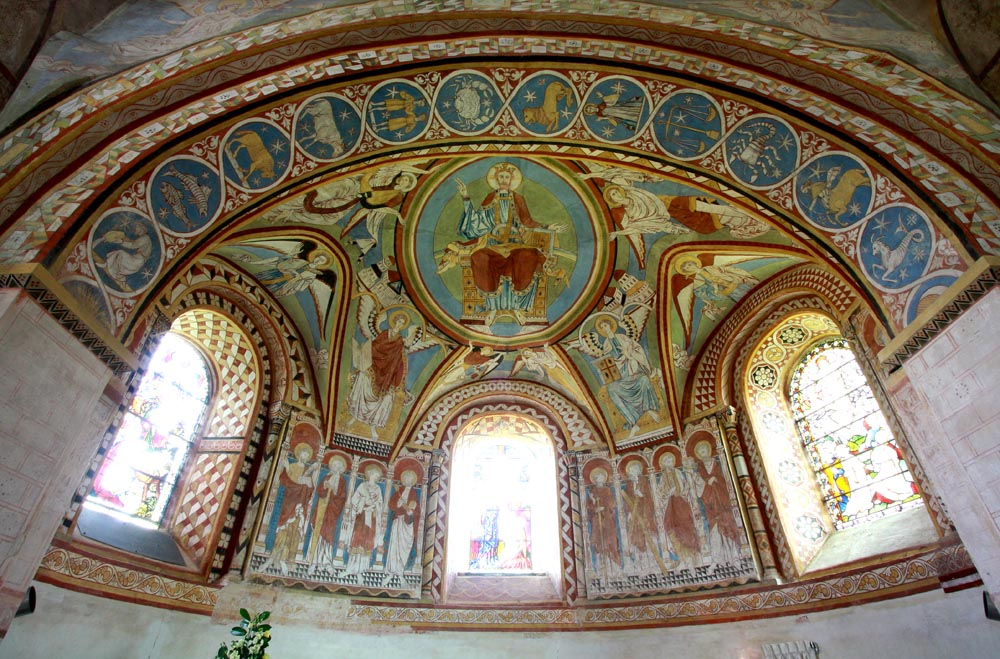

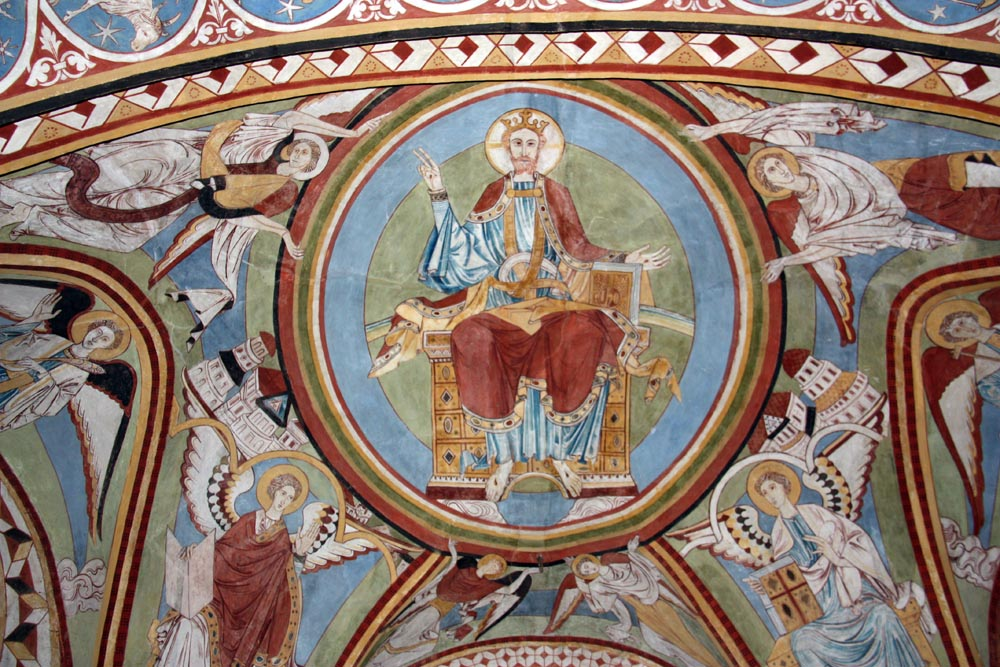

== See also ==
- St Mary's Church, Kempley
- St Peter and St Paul's Church, Pickering
- St Botolph's Church, Hardham
