= Hezekiah Haynes =

Hezekiah Haynes (died 1693) supported the parliamentary cause during the English Civil War rising to the rank of major. During the Interregnum, under the patronage of his war time commander General Charles Fleetwood, he held a number of administrative posts under the early Commonwealth and Protectorate. He supported his old general during the late Commonwealth, and after spending 18 months in prison during the first couple of years of the Restoration, he retired to the family estate of Copford Hall in Essex.

== Biography ==
Haynes supported the parliamentary cause during the English Civil War. At the outbreak of war he took a captains commission in Colonel Holborne's regiment of foot. He transferred to Charles Fleetwood's cavalry regiment and by 1645 had risen to the rank of major. He fought at Battle of Preston in 1648, commanded the regiment at the Battle of Dunbar in 1650 and may well have fought at Worcester in the last battle of the Civil War.

During the Interregnum he held a number of administrative posts, all of them in and around his home region of East Anglia. From August 1655 until January 1657 while England and Wales were under the rule of the Major-Generals, he was a deputy to Charles Fleetwood, along with George Fleetwood and William Packer. Each carried out the day-to-day administration in different counties in the region assigned to their governor.

After the death of Oliver Cromwell, Haynes supported the Wallingford House party when they overthrew Richard Cromwell and in 1659 introduced the short lived second Commonwealth. In December, shortly before the Restoration, the Rump Parliament ordered him to leave London and return home, but he chose not to. In November 1660 he was arrested on suspicion of subversion, and held in the Tower of London for 18 months. He was released in April 1662 upon payment of a £5,000 bond for his future good behaviour. He retired to his family estate of Copford Hall and lived quietly until his death on 26 August 1693.

=== Family ===
Haynes was the second son of John Haynes of Copford Hall in Essex and Mary Thornton, daughter of Robert Thornton of Nottingham. In the early 1650s he married Anne, daughter of Thomas Smithsby, the former saddler to Charles I. They had at least one son.

Haynes passed the family seat of Copford Hall over to his son in 1684, and moved to Coggeshall where he died in 1693.
