= John Bragg (stockbroker) =

English stockbroker and financier

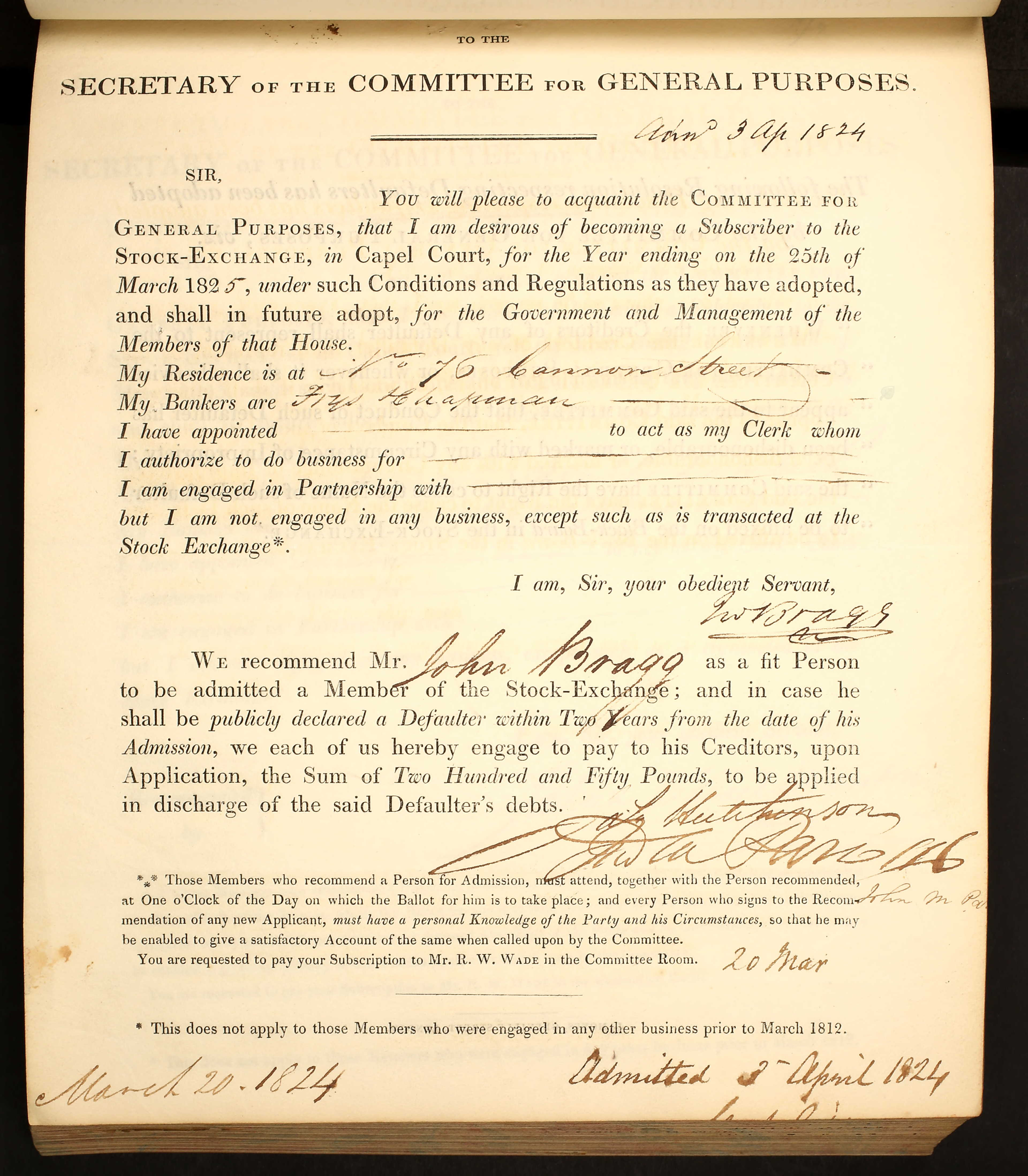
John Bragg, Esq.'s election to the London Stock Exchange, 3 April, 1824

John Bragg (July 8, 1796 – October 20, 1868) was an English stockbroker and financier.

Born in Whitehaven on the coastal edge of the Lake District in Cumbria to Joseph Bragg, Esq., "a gentleman" and his wife Elizabeth, née Skelton, and noted as a neighbour and friend of the Earl of Carlisle, he moved to London and was elected a member of the Stock Exchange in 1824. He founded his company Bragg & Co at No.6 Throgmorton Street, adjacent to the old London Stock Exchange at Capel Court at Nos.7-9, and later part of the Old Stock Exchange building. His original clients included the future British Prime Minister Benjamin Disraeli.

By the 1840s, he was in partnership with stockbroker George Stockdale and heavily involved in the boom in mining, railways and infrastructure projects for the British Empire. He was a notable figure in the City, from testifying as one of a dozen stockbrokers before the House of Lords commission during the Forged Exchequer Bills Scandal of the 1840s, to part funding Crown Agents loans to the colony of Mauritius to build its railway.

In 1852 he married Eleanor, daughter of Rev. Robert Otway Wilson, B.D., whose photograph by Camille Silvy is in the National Portrait Gallery, and they had a daughter, Mary Elizabeth Bragg, who went on to marry Percival Bowen in 1877 and have six children.

John Bragg died peacefully in his home of No. 1 Porchester Gardens in the City of Westminster in London in 1868 worth £30,000, or roughly £30 million in today's money adjusted for average earnings.

Following his death, in 1888 George Stockdale partnered with Frederic Hall, maintaining the founder's name in what was now Bragg, Stockdale, Hall & Co. In 1975 it merged with Fiske & Co, with senior partner Lord Michael Brudenell-Bruce, 8th Marquess of Ailesbury joining with Fiske senior partner Clive Fiske Harrison, Esq., who himself had been recruited out of the University of Cambridge to Panmure Gordon by Ian Cameron, father of another future British Prime Minister, David Cameron. Bragg's venture thus continued as "Fiske & Co, also incorporating Bragg, Stockdale, Hall & Co."

In 2022, following the acquisition of Charles Stanley - which was founded in 1792 and took over Bragg's offices at No.6 in 1953 - by Raymond James, it inherited the title of oldest independent stockbroker in the City of London.
