= Copford =

Village and civil parish in Essex, England

Coordinates: 51.88126°N 0.803719°E

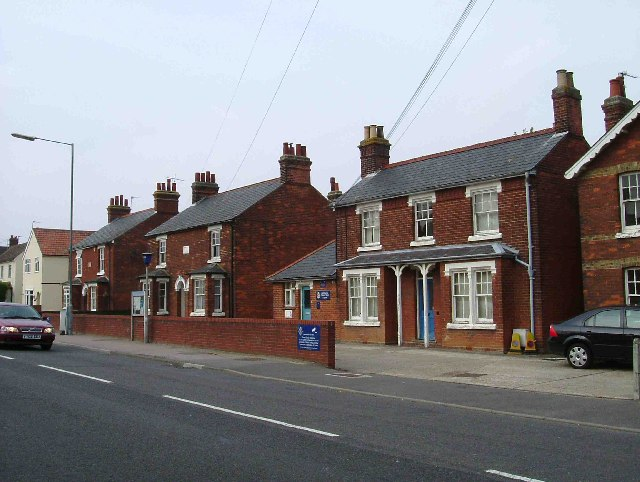
- Copford police station

- Location within Essex
- Population: 1,726 (Parish, 2021)
- OS grid reference: TL9223
- Civil parish: Copford
- District: City of Colchester
- Shire county: Essex
- Region: East
- Country: England
- Sovereign state: United Kingdom
- Post town: Colchester
- Postcode district: CO6
- Dialling code: 01206
- Police: Essex
- Fire: Essex
- Ambulance: East of England
- UK Parliament: Witham

Copford is a village and civil parish in the City of Colchester district of Essex, England. It is 3 kilometres (2 mi) west of Colchester, and the hamlet of Copford Green is found a short distance to the south. The poet Matthew Arnold noted he was struck by "the deeply rural character of the village and neighbourhood." The parish also includes the village of Easthorpe. At the 2021 census the parish had a population of 1,726.

== History ==
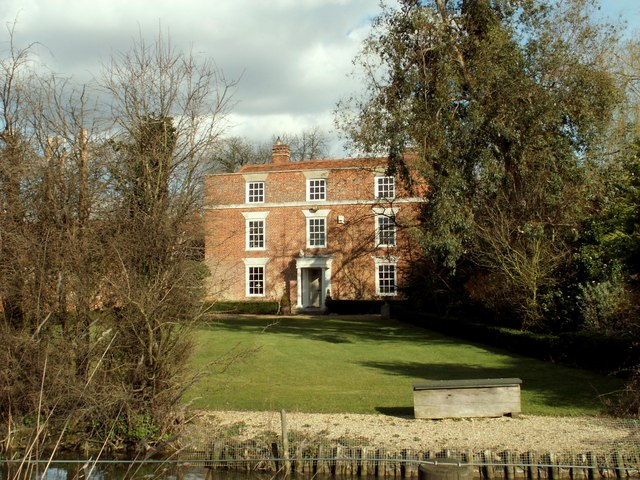
Farmhouse at Moat Farm

Copford was originally a manor held by the Bishop of London's office. Upon the death of Bishop Edmund Bonner in 1569 (also buried here) the land briefly became property of The Crown until 1609 when it returned to private ownership.

The Church of England parish church of St Michael and All Angels is Grade I listed. It is renowned for its mid-12th-century Norman wall paintings that are among the best in England. The paintings were extensively restored in the late 19th century. The church door was claimed to have human skin attached, possibly as a gruesome remnant of an ancient flaying meted out to those who invaded the sanctity of the church. Adjacent to the church is the manor house of Copford Hall.

== Governance ==
The official name of the civil parish is just Copford, but the parish council calls itself "Copford and Easthorpe Parish Council". Easthorpe was formerly a separate parish, which was abolished in 1949 and absorbed into Copford parish (subject to some adjustments to the boundaries with other neighbouring parishes).

Copford is part of the electoral ward called Copford and West Stanway. The population of this ward at the 2011 Census was 1,915.

== Transport ==
Copford is situated about half a mile east of the junction between the A12 and A120 at Marks Tey.

The closest rail link is the Great Eastern Main Line, which connects London Liverpool Street to Norwich, and stops at Marks Tey station.

The village is served by the 70 and 71 bus services at the London Road end, thus giving access to Colchester, Chelmsford and Braintree via public transport.

Copford Green and the neighbouring village of Easthorpe are served every Wednesday by a community bus for which tickets must be purchased in advance.

== Community ==
Copford is divided into 3 distinct areas of population, the largest of which is the Queensberry Avenue Estate with some 250 houses. London Road/School Road (down to the Village Hall) has approx. 190 dwellings, and the Copford Green area a further 150.

The village has a Hall built in the early 1990s, and a School parts of which date back to Victorian times, and the majority of which was rebuilt with the addition of a new School Hall in 2002 and KS2 block in 2023.

The Parish Council owns two play parks (one behind the Village Hall, the other on Queensberry Avenue), and woods complete with a picnic area and several walks.

== Notable people ==
- Tirzah Garwood (1908 - 1951), artist who lived at Copford Place
- Benjamin Lay (1682 - 1759), British/American abolitionist and Quaker
