= Copford Hall =

Grade II listed country house in Essex, England

Coordinates: 51.8697°N 0.8089°E

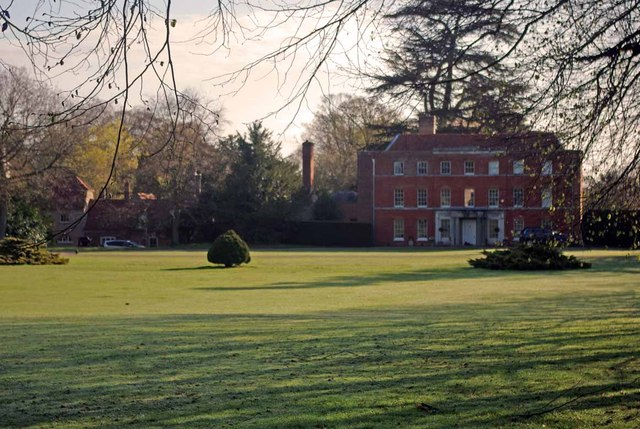
Copford Hall

Copford Hall is a manorial seat and Grade II listed country house, with gardens by Capability Brown, in the village of Copford, Essex, England, 46 miles (74 km) from London. The building was at one time owned by the bishops of London, and its grounds are described in Pevsner as "almost the beau idéal of what to the foreigner is an English landscape scene".

The present house is a large, square red-brick building with stone dressing and ornamentation, the façade the result of alterations in the early 1800s. However, the majority of the structure dates back to 1720, and parts of the inside to the early 1600s. The extensive grounds include canals, fishponds and water features. On the lowest pool is a classical boathouse.

Part of the possessions of the bishopric See of London before the Norman conquest of England, it came into the possession of the Crown and was sold by King James I of England to the Mountjoy family. It was purchased from them by John Haynes in 1626, who later went to North America where he served as governor of the Massachusetts Bay Colony and then as the first governor of the Connecticut Colony.

His son, Cromwell's Major General Hezekiah Haynes, took it over in 1657. It passed to a cousin by marriage, Major John Haynes Harrison of the Essex Militia, who married the heiress daughter of Reverend John Fiske and his wife Sarah in 1783. Their children included Fiske Goodeve Fiske-Harrison. It was later owned by his descendant A. B. C. Harrison, Lord of the Manor of Copford, former High Sheriff and Deputy Lord Lieutenant of Essex and, former MP for Maldon in Essex.
