= List of parliaments of England =

This is a list of parliaments of England from the reign of King Henry III, when the Curia Regis developed into a body known as Parliament, until the creation of the Parliament of Great Britain in 1707.

For later parliaments, see the List of parliaments of Great Britain. For the history of the English Parliament, see Parliament of England.

The parliaments of England were traditionally referred to by the number counting forward from the start of the reign of a particular monarch, unless the parliament was notable enough to come to be known by a particular title, such as the Good Parliament or the Parliament of Merton.

== Parliaments of Henry III ==
No.	Summoned	Selected	Assembled	Dissolved	Sessions	Presiding officer (Note: The presiding officer of the House of Commons was initially known as the "Prolocutor" and sometimes as the Parlour, but the term most often used was "Speaker" and this became the title always used from the 1540s onwards.)	Note
1st (Note: No commoners were summoned.)	1 November 1236	n/a	1 January 1237	...	?	n/a	Henry III commenced his reign on 19 October 1216. The first summons of parliamentum generalissimum in November 1236 for January 1237, was for 24 barons, known as a Special Writ formed Curia Regis (later House of Lords), but only 18 actually attended. The first parliamentum was a result of baronial revolt and an infant minority King in wardship, rather than the celebrated Magna Carta, specifically. A writ of mandamus was sent to bishops, the lords spiritual, and judges. Lord Chancellor was responsible for summons, and in later parliaments for writ of patent (peer creation); Writs of Tenure were issued to royal officers, and in medieval parliaments to sheriffs and knights, latterly 'of the shire' who had won their spurs, to come armed. (Note: In the reign of King John knights came armed to police the parlement, but barons and nobles were not permitted to have weaponry in precincts of Westminster. The king wanted protection, but no violence, and no brawling. The lesser men were therefore noblesse oblige to the king's service in knight's fee.) Burgesses were rarely summoned, e.g. when Edward I wanted extra funds. Statute of Merton was generally the first passed by an English 'parliament'. The "whole body (universitas) knoweth not," denying the king on thirtieth imposition.
2nd	14 December 1241	n/a	27 January 1242	...	?	n/a	The king's writ summoned the barons to appear at London on the Wednesday before Candlemas Day. The barons engaged one another by oath not to consent to give any money at all. They accused the king of "extortions" that were "wasted scandalously".
3rd	1244		1244	...	?	n/a	The king asked for "a pecuniary aid". The barons wanted to be consulted about the "proposal". The king refused the "Petition of the Nobles"; the king should choose counsellors by advice of the Committee of Twelve. The king's Treasury, through the Great Council, should hear the complaints of all sufferers, and act with aids for the common good.
4th	1246	n/a	1246	...	?	n/a	Parliamentum generalissimum met at London to pass severe laws against robbery. They argued against the Pope's Peter-Pence that oppressed the kingdom.
3rd	...	n/a	3 February 1247	...	?	n/a	Universitas meaning the 'whole of the clergy' were summoned to the council in London. Baronial letters preserved by Matthew Paris showed fear of the Vatican bulls and interdicts.
4th	...	n/a	23 January 1248	12 February 1248	?	n/a	Parliamentum met at London during Hilary term. Writs showed how outlawry reached the statute books; by holding it contract void, no one could be imprisoned without first obtaining a judgement in court. No justiciar appointed, and no chancellor for Henry to receive a long list of grievances. Henry claimed cum privilegio right to choose his own ministers. On 9 February, the king used church hierarchy to buttress power in colloquium with lay magnates to raise taxes.
	...	n/a	1 March 1251		?	n/a	A parliament at London was called to try Henry de Batho, the Chief Justice, for treason. Lord John Mansel had to quell the fury of the mob. de Batho was released on payment of 2,000 marks.
5th	...	n/a	1 October 1252		?	n/a	Michaelmas term at Westminster intercommuning (communiter) took place between church and lay magnates. One tenth of all the goods of clergy voted for three years to conformatio and deliberate the charters.
6th	...	n/a	1 January 1253	...	?	n/a	Met at Winchester Castle. By April/May the council/parliament voted one tenth, and the king received feudal aids for knighting his eldest son, the Lord Edward. Observance of writs of the charters included an army muster at London.
7th	11 February 1254	n/a	26 April 1254	...	?	n/a	A parliament was called to Westminster after Easter. The royal letter and memorandum remains.
8th	...	n/a	18 April 1255	...	?	n/a	Met at Westminster and London, it demanded one-tenth tax, pecuniary aid, 'common counsel'; "advice and deliberation of the assembled realm." It was postponed until the Autumn 1255. John Stowe raised the principle of parliament by consent.
9th	...	n/a	1 October 1255	...	?	n/a	A parliament met at London and lasted only a month.
10th	...	n/a	2 April 1258	2 May 1258	?	n/a	On 12 April Hugh de Lusignan occupies Westminster Hall with a body of armed men. Parliament met at London, but was adjourned on 5 May, to retire as a Council of Twenty-four to Oxford. Henry relied on his richest individual nobles, communitas regni to raise funds, for example, Earl of Derby and Earl of Salisbury.
11th	2 May 1258	n/a	11 June 1258	...	?	n/a	Parliament met on St Barnabas Day. Committee of 24 met at Oxford on 12 June (but writs confused by 'doctored' records.). There were 137 Knights among the nobles. First time a Justiciar of England, Hugh Bigod, was elected by parliament (22 June 1258). Twenty castellans were appointed. On 22 June a royal order for the election of a permanent council. On 26 June, a council of fifteen was chosen; twelve by writ, and three nominated by King Henry III. The Greater Council of nobles met in parliament at Michaelmas, Candlemas, and Midsummer. On 13 May, the king ordered the sheriffs of Yorkshire and Northumberland to attend the Edinburgh Parliament. The parliament in colloquium was called so Henry III could declare war on Llywelyn of Wales.
12th	...	n/a	13 October 1258	...	?	n/a	The Chronica Majora mentioned "a great and long parliament" at Westminster, on 6 October, for "the provisions (purveances) and Establishments (establissemnz)". Sheriffs were appointed as custodes to almost every shire; complaints could be made without fear of reprisal. They could claim court expenses for duties, respect all parties; and to refuse gifts. On 18 October, a proclamation made it a felony to oppose a sheriff's jurisdiction. On 20 October, it was declared that proclamations would be read pluries in anno throughout the year.
13th	...	n/a	27 October 1258	4 November 1258	?	Peter de Montfort	The parliament probably moved on towards Oxford on the Octave of Michaelmas. It is sometimes known as the Mad Parliament. Knights of the shire (representing counties) were the only commoners summoned. They were not required to be chosen by election. Between 1237 and 1258, the king was refused a grant of aid on nine occasions. Parliament already had a say on 80% of the revenues; only 20% went directly to the Exchequer.
14th	...	n/a	3 February 1259	...	?	n/a	Parliament met at Westminster on the morrow of Candlemas. Justices were called eight days before, to prepare a document called The Provisions of the Barons of England. On 14 March, Lord Edward and Richard de Clare disputing the Welsh Marches forced to swear to observe the new treaty witnessed by Henry of Almain and the Earl Warenne. And on 30 March, The Ordinances of the Magnates were published, two days after that in favour of lesser tenants. A peaceful compact was reached with the proctors of the clergy.
15th	...	24 May 1259	13 October 1259	...	?	n/a	This parliament was held at Westminster. Its legislation was known as the 'Provisions of Westminster'. There was a parliament in Midsummer, 1259 because all ordinances had to be issued before 1 November, banning writs precipe and baronial protection to lesser men; there were however many complaints, petitions, writs of entry, and specific querelae . The free tenement had to be protected by the actions of novel disseisin. The new legislative provisions were translated from French into Latin, enrolled in The Close Rolls after being read in the presence of the King at Westminster Hall. There may have been nine parliaments between 1258 and 1261.
16th	...	n/a	Michaelmas 1259	14 November 1259	?	n/a	Parliament was held at Westminster. "The Provisions of Oxford" was not a document: it was practical and temporary record that limited royal government. Drawn up by 24 barons independent of, and not by parliament. On 24 October, the Provisions of Westminster were published. Henry sailed with the sealed Writs on 14 November 1259, and so the parliamentary session ended.
17th	27 March 1260	n/a	>30 April 1260	...	?	n/a	Over 100 barons and tenants-in-chief were summoned to Westminster, by special writ while the king was in France. Citizens of London drafted complaints against Lord Edward and Earl of Leicester.
18th	...	n/a	8 July 1260	...	?	n/a	The Hoketide parliament at Candlemas was cancelled to take the fight among the barons to Llywelyn. But one did finally meet at Westminster. On 20 July Roger Mortimer of Wigmore was blamed for the loss of the Castle of Builth, but he was absolved.
19th	...	n/a	13 October 1260	...	?	n/a	Parliament met at Westminster. In October, Hugh Bigod sought re-election as Justiciar (but electorate appears to have been 5 men only of the council). The new Chancellor Nicholas of Ely and treasurer abbot of Peterborough, were men of the second rank noblesse de robe. It was moved in January 1261 to the Tower of London.
20th	...	n/a	c.23 February 1261	...	?	n/a	Parliament met during Candlemas at Westminster. The King acknowledged abolition of 7-year General Eyre by the provisions of Westminster, after Sheriffs had submitted capitula or heads of eyre to parliament and the 7 special Justices, commissars on the administrative provisions of October 1258. Royal bailiffs who 'deferring' justice could already be punished since June 1258.
21st	11 December 1261	n/a	2 February 1262	...	?	n/a	A parliament met at Westminster for Hilary term. In March, the king tried to ask parliament to react to Pope Alexander IV's cancellation of Prince Edmund's grant to the Kingdom of Sicily; but parliament to Henry it was too late. The new mood was repentiam et novam bringing great change, baronial influence, that was not acceptable to the Pope.
22nd		n/a	1 October 1262	...	?	n/a	Parliament met at Michaelmas at Westminster. De Montfort and Pope demanded 'Provisions of Oxford' be upheld by the King. They were re-issued on 22 January 1263.
23rd	17 August 1263	n/a	8 September 1263	>18 September 1263	?	n/a	Called for the Feast of the Nativity of the Blessed Mary at St Paul's. Provisions of Oxford were confirmed and promulgated. Henry rejected proposal that Council should appoint royal officers of the household; Montfort was recognised as undisputed leader and steward. On 16 September, Simon de Montfort, Earl of Leicester was sent to the Tower for sedition. Council had failed to distinguish between politics and dealing with the violent spoliatores; many went without redress. The Amendment of Provisions was dropped.
24th	18 September 1263	n/a	13 October 1263	30 October 1263	?	n/a	Called for Michaelmas at Westminster. On 8 September, the provisum (provisions) were promulgated at St Paul's. Government removed to Windsor, and the Lord Edward ordered parliament to break up on 30 October; it was the beginning of the end for De Montfort and the Provisions.
25th	...	n/a	1 March 1264	3 April 1264	?	n/a	De Montfort at Northampton had defeated the royalists, while Henry held a parliament at Oxford. The bishops were present. Montfort published the Ordinance (28 June 1264) of the Mise of Lewes which encompassed the principles of the Provisions. The triumvirate chose 9 councillors, three of whom would monitor the King's progress. The parliament probably broke up when Henry marched out in April with the dragon standard. Montfort planned deposition, imprisonment and banishment for the King and royal princes.
25th	4 June 1264	n/a	22 June 1264	12 August 1264	?	n/a	Summoned against the De Montfortians, the Provisioners versus 'the men of the shire'. They discussed the noble prisoners taken at Northampton; castellans and refugees, the Jews of London, and trade with the Continent. Elected knights of the shire were the only commoners summoned from about 20 constituencies. They were not required to be chosen by election. Parliament/council faced a threatened French invasion. The new Council of Nine was constituted forma regiminis drawn up by 28 June. The Court moved to papal negotiations in Kent; Montfort drafted 'the Peace of Canterbury' on 14 August. The Council suffered, discord and alienation, whereas the Franciscans rallied to De Montfort after parliament broke up.
26th	12 December 1264	1264/1265	20 January 1265	15 February 1265	?	unknown	Writs sent out from Worcester, this Parliament is sometimes known as Montfort's Parliament. This is not the first Parliament to which representatives of cities and boroughs were summoned, as well as knights of the shires; burgesses were first summoned in 1204. It is also the first Parliament to which the representatives were required to be chosen by election in a consultative role. Parliament was still in session on 8 March.
27th	...	n/a	March 1265	...	?	n/a	A parliament met at Westminster, where the Charter of Liberties was confirmed, as was the fines of miskenning abolished. Nine bishops excommunicated transgressors of the Charters of liberties, forest, and the statutes passed by the De Montfortian parliaments. Enemies spread rumours of castellan alienation. Only the Marcher Lords stood in the way of total Montfortian victory. Oxford scholar, Thomas de Cantilupe, bishop of Worcester, was elected Lord Chancellor by the council. Montfort's Treaty of Pipton (19 June 1265) with Llewelyn, a codicil included the covenant forced on Henry III in parliament, to disinherit the Lord Edward and, seeking his own deposition on pain of its breach.
28th	...	n/a	14 September 1265	...	?	n/a	Met at Winchester Castle. First summons of Town burgesses to parliament. Young Simon de Montfort was declared an outlaw; his title of Earl of Leicester was forfeit, and granted to Prince Edmund on 20 October 1265 in a royal charter.
29th	...	n/a	1 August 1266	...	?	n/a	Parliament called to Kenilworth. The council declared the Kenilworth Dictum.
30th	8 March 1267	n/a	9 February 1267	...	?	n/a	Met at Bury St Edmunds to discuss investing the Isle of Ely held by Montfortian rebel John de Vescy. Efforts to restore lands to The Disinherited. At Lincoln in October, Papal Legate Ottobuono ordered the church to donate one-twentieth tax to The Disinherited.
31st		n/a	1 November 1267	...	?	n/a	The king met a parliament at Marlborough. The Statute of Marlborough (18 November 1267) guaranteed poor access to justice; compliance with Charter of Liberties; and baronial redemption payments for rebellion. Charter writs were granted for free. It also incorporated clauses protecting tenants in Provisions of Westminster. Taxation Assessment of the North of England was completed; that included a Tallage of the towns and royal demesne attempting to raise more secular general aid.
32nd		n/a	1 April 1268	...	?	n/a	Parliament met at London. 26 town representatives (or burgesses) are recorded.
33rd		n/a	1 June 1268	...	?	n/a	The royal family and nobles met with Ottobuono at Northampton "in a time of parliament". 700 persons took the cross for a holy crusade from the legate.
34th	20 September 1268	n/a	13 October 1268	...	1	n/a	Met in London at Michaelmas : the 45 royalists included 6 bishops and 3 earls elected by the five northern shires to "ordain and dispose" of the aid to the king. The bishops were considered 'lay fees' for the purposes of tax collection. The tax on personal property was the first on the laity since 1237.
35th		n/a	1 January 1269	...	?	n/a	
36th		n/a	1 April 1269	...	?	n/a	
35th	21 June 1269	n/a	24 June 1269	...	1	n/a	Lords and Commons (knights and burgesses) assembled at Westminster on the Octave or Feast of St John the Baptist, to watch consecration of body of Edward the Confessor at Westminster Abbey.
36th		n/a	13 October 1269	...	1	n/a	The Michaelmas (29 September) parliament met at Westminster for the Feast of St Edward the Confessor. St Edward the Confessor's relic bones moved on St Edward's Day, 13 October 1269 to a new ambulatory shrine. Knights were appointed to assess and collect the tax. (Note: Powicke believed the decision of the Committee of 45 to collect tax was indicative of the presence of a parliament. This opinion was based on Henry III's letter dated 7 August at Chichester to the bishop of Worcester, referring to the one-twentieth assessed for aid to the Holy Land the previous year.) The one-twentieth was given by the communa but probably hung in suspense at the king's request.
37th	28 March 1270	n/a	27 April 1270	20 August 1270	?	n/a	On second Tuesday after Easter a great Hoketide parliament met at Westminster, "nearly all the bishops, earls, barons, knights and free tenants of the whole of England." The Commons finally agreed with the Lords to the one-twentieth on moveables tax demanded on 12 May. On 13 May, nine bishops read Pope Innocent IV's bull confirming the Charter Liberties (1245). They republished the Great Charters of 1225, and those of Westminster Hall (1253). The king ordered enforcement of the restrictions upon Jewish bonds. Violence broke out in the hall among the disinherited: John de Warenne attacked Alan la Zouche, who later died of his wounds.
38th	24 May 1272	n/a	c.>29 September 1272	...	?	n/a	Met at Westminster, the last parliament of the reign.

== Parliaments of Edward I ==
No.	Summoned	Elected	Assembled	Dissolved	Sessions	Presiding officer (Note: The presiding officer of the House of Commons was initially known as the "Prolocutor" and sometimes as the Parlour, but the term most often used was "Speaker" and this became the title always used from the 1540s onwards.)	Note
1st	27 December 1274	1275	29 April 1275	19 June 1275	1	unknown	Originally intended for 16 Feb, the quinzaine of Purification of the Blessed Mary, parliament was prorogued. For the first time since 1264–1265 the representatives of the communities of the Realm are known to have been summoned to London a fortnight after the Close of Easter or Octave of Easter, which was one week after Easter Sunday. Parliament may have actually opened on 29 April or in the first week of May. Edward I's first parliament enacted the Statute of Westminster. The session ended early because the King was ill. It was the first parliament in which burgesses were allowed to sit.
2nd	7 October 1275	1275	13 October 1275	5 November 1275	1	unknown	Parliaments were granted in perpetuum. This one was probably held around Feast of St Luke the Evangelist (16 Oct). Almost every magnate attended; the knights of the shires only were summoned to this Parliament and not the burgesses met at Westminster on the 'Quinzaine of Michaelmas'. The magna custuma of wool, wool-fells, and hides, and the Statute of Jewry.
3rd (Note: No commoners were summoned.)	...	n/a	1 May 1276	3 June 1276	?	n/a	Met at Westminster a Fortnight after Easter.
4th	29 July 1276	n/a	>29 September 1276	18 November 1276	1	unknown	The king arrived at Westminster on 11 October, a fortnight after Michaelmas. But on 15 November the Close Rolls were published. The Statute of Ragman was passed de justiciariis assignatis and was preceded in the same session by statute de Bigamis. Parliament was probably over when the King left on 18 November.
5th	...	n/a	1 May 1277	...	?	n/a	Met at Westminster.
6th	...	n/a	1 May 1278	...	?	n/a	Met at Gloucester "Three Weeks after Easter".
7th	...	n/a	8 July 1278	...	1	n/a	Met at Westminster. 61 petitions were submitted against royal officials in the localities. The phrase "the whole community of the realm" implies parliament has the right to raise taxation.
8th	...	n/a	1 August 1278	...	1	n/a	Parliament met at Gloucester. Quo warranto proceedings was issued on the terms of Treaty of Conway against the Welsh Prince Llywelyn.
9th	...	n/a	29 September 1278	...	?	n/a	Met at Westminster.
10th	...	n/a	c.16 April 1279	...	?	n/a	Met at Westminster after Easter. Statute of Mortmain ordered by the King to prevent land grants to the Church.
11th	...	n/a	c.20 October 1279	...	?	n/a	Met at Westminster, they passed the important Statute of Religious Men. Llywelyn mounts criminal defence at parliament with his proctors [attorneys].
12th	...	n/a	c.12 May 1280	...	1	n/a	Met at Westminster after Easter. The King denied using Writs of Prohibition on Grievances to prevent the collection of Tithes on the new mills. Llywelyn appealed to King's own 'statutes' in common law under Treaty of Conway. The prince said the raid on Meririonydd was "contrary to the peace and the king's statutes." Llywelyn tried under law of Hywel Dda.
13th	10 June 1280	n/a	c.>29 September 1280	...	1	n/a	Met at Westminster, "under the seal of our Justiciar of Ireland".
14th	...	n/a	c.11 May 1281	...	1	n/a	Met at Westminster "a month after Easter."
15th	...	n/a	c.>29 September 1281	...	?	n/a	
16th	30 May 1282	n/a	30 September 1282	10 November 1282	?	n/a	The king summoned the nobility during May from Acton Burnell Manor. This parliament met at Shrewsbury. 10 earls and 100 barons were summoned using the military lists. Parliament was forced to move to Robert Burnell's estate at Acton Burnell. Edward returned during October and November to enact legislation, including the Statute of Acton Burnel begins work on the issue of debts and debtors.
17th	26 June 1283	n/a	30 September 1283	...	?	n/a	summoned by King Edward I at Rhuddlan Castle. 110 barons and 74 knights were called to Shrewsbury, but there was no room in the town, so they decamped 8 miles away to Acton Burnell, home of the Archdeacon of York, Robert Burnell, the new Lord Chancellor of England, and later Bishop of Bath and Wells. On 19 March, Edward issued great Statute of Wales...And we wish those laws and customs to be kept and observed in perpetuity in our lands in those parts...."
18th	...	n/a	December 1284	...	?	n/a	held at Bristol.
19th	...	n/a	4 May 1285	...	?	n/a	Parliament met at Westminster. Second Statute of Westminster, 1285 and the Statute of Merchants.
20th	...	n/a	Michaelmas 1285	...	?	n/a	It was held at Winchester Castle and known as the 'Great Council'. The Statute of Winchester began formalizing the criminal law. The Statute of Merchants recognised the problem of tackling debts. Lord Mayors to hear creditor cases; formulation of the scheme. royal writs made Statute of Gloucester, Statute of Mortmain, and Statute of Westminster applicable to governing law of Ireland.
21st	...	n/a	c.>14 April 1286	...	?	n/a	
22nd	...	n/a	c.24 April 1286	...	?	n/a	was held at London.
23rd	...	n/a	February 1289	...	?	n/a	A parliament was summoned in London but never took place.
24th	...	n/a	>13 January 1290	...	?	n/a	was held at Westminster
25th	Easter 1290	1290	23 April 1290	16 July 1290	?	unknown	Knights only summoned 13–14 June 1290. Assembled 23 April 1290 Lords and 15 July 1290 Commons. After this Parliament, it became fairly usual for the representatives of the counties, cities and boroughs to be summoned to attend Parliament and from 1320 they were always included.
26th	...	1290	11 October 1290	11 November 1290	1		A parliament was held at Clipstone, Nottinghamshire by King Edward in Sherwood Forest; it was the third that year. This royal manor had a hunting lodge, houses, chapel, mill, pool and park. on 25 October the magnates granted a tax of one-fifteenth on moveables, and Edward agreed Pope Honorius IV's plan to go on crusade to the Holy Land, because he had taken the cross at Blanquefort.
27th	...	1290/1291	7 January 1291	24 January 1291	1		The King held parliament at Ashridge Palace, near the royal Berkhamsted Castle on Hertfordshire/Buckinghamshire boundary. 20 clerks (13 were priests) from the new college served the parliament, known as The Good Men of Ashridge. King saw justice was done in some difficult cases and one "there had never been the like."
28th	...	?	1 October 1291	...	?		It met at Abergavenny. State trials of traitors in the Welsh Wars. One of the 'exceptions' was the punitive fine of £10,000 marks on Gilbert, Earl of Gloucester, and 1,000 marks on Earl of Hereford. Gloucester challenged the King with Writ of scire facias, which was allowed on technical arguments. Edward said he "..had a much more arduous record excelling all his ministers...". But the writ was quashed by the inhibition proclamation (1290). Gloucester was forced to pay the crippling charge.
29th	6 May 1291	1291/1292	8 January 1292	...	7	unknown	Parliament met that summer on the green, on the banks of the river and in the king's chamber of Norham Castle, Northumberland, in the Palatinate of the Prince-bishop of Durham. Most of the nobility was present both spiritual and temporal "a certain other prelates, earls, barons, magnates, nobles and commoners (populares)". The issue during June was suzerainty over Scotland. They discussed the civil war between Balliol and Bruce.
30th	Jan 1292	n/a	2 June 1292	...	?	n/a	This parliament included Scottish members; met at Westminster.
31st	...	n/a	13 October 1292	17 November 1292	1	n/a	This parliament at Westminster included Scottish members, who discussed Balliol's claim, upon which the king's representative, Roger Brabazon decided. On 20 November, Balliol swore fealty to King Edward I.
32nd	...	?1293	>29 March 1293	...	?	unknown	Parliament met at Easter.
33rd	...	1293	13 October 1293	...	?	unknown	Met at Westminster.
34th	...	1293	12 September 1294	...	?	unknown	Florence of Worcester called it a parliamentum on 21 September.
35th	...		12 November 1294	...	?		The parliament met at Westminster, but the town burgesses were not present.
36th	24 June 1295	n/a	16 August 1295	...	?	n/a	53 barons were summoned to Westminster.
37th	30 September 1295	1295	27 November 1295	4 December 1295	?	unknown	Model Parliament summoned 41 barons on 30 September 1 and 3 October 1295; and a maximum of 62 'white Abbots' and 37 'black Abbots', by mainly Frankalmoign. This is the traditional start of the regular participation of the Commons in Parliament summoned Praemunientes, "in place of the communities of the counties." Sheriffs only sent representatives from towns and shires, and not the lower clergy.
38th	26 August 1296	1296	3 November 1296	29 November 1296	?	unknown	Held at Berwick-upon-Tweed.
39th	26 January 1297	n/a	24 February 1297	...	?	n/a	Met at Salisbury and was dominated by Roger Bigod, Justiciar of England and Marshall of the King's Army; and Humphrey de Bohun, Constable of England.
40th	8 May 1297	n/a	8 June 1297	...	?	n/a	Met at Westminster. The king addressed the public in person outside Westminster Hall. (the rebel earls called a parallel parliament at Northampton).
41st	20 August 1297	1297	15 September 1297	14 October 1297	?	unknown	Summoned by the King to meet in his absence, after 24 August, when the Lords presented the Monstraunces. Those not on the expedition arrived at different times on 30 September 1297 (peers) and 6 October 1297 (knights of the shire) for a total of 170. Another 56 writs were despatched on 28 August. Assembled 9 October 1297 Lords and 15 October 1297 Commons met in London. Earl of Norfolk's party held their own rival parliament at Northampton. The King issued a pardon to Norfolk and Hereford. (Note: the dates for the summons of the parliament are highly tendentious: EC, 36-42. Documents illustrating the Crisis of 1297-8 in England, ed. M.Prestwich, CS 4th ser.24(1980). The British Library manuscripts cite 10 October 1297 as the first day.)
42nd	14 October 1297		14 January 1298	...	?	unknown	Met in York granted the King a one-fifth tax for his army in Flanders "because they were nearer the danger." Scottish peers were summoned by failed to appear. Another muster was called to York for 25 May "colloquium et tractatus with the earls, barons, and proceres regni of our realm."
43rd	10 April 1298	1298	25 May 1298	...	?	unknown	Summoned 10, 11 and 13 April 1298, Parliament met at York. On 10 April knights and burgesses also summoned. Edward intended it to confirm victory in Scotland.
44th	6 February 1299	n/a	8 March 1299	...	?	n/a	Summoned to Westminster; recess in April for perambulation of the forest; parliament reconvened that May. Sittings sent east for safety to Stepney, immediately east of the City of London.
45th	10 April 1299	n/a	3 May 1299	...	?	n/a	July 1297, The Earls draft Remonstrances, being complaints against the King. They present De Tallagio a principle opposition against raising arbitrary taxation. Confirmatio Cartarum requires the King to reaffirm the promises made in Magna Carta.
46th	21 September 1299	n/a	18 October 1299	...	?	n/a	Ten English earls, Scots earls of Angus and Dunbar, and 97 barons were summoned to York, to muster for knights service against the Scots.
47th	29 December 1299	1299/1300	6 March 1300	20 March 1300	30 April 1300	unknown	11 earls, 99 barons, 38 judges and officials, all the archbishops and bishops, and praemunientes (representatives) of the lower clergy met at Westminster. Writs were also sent to about 60 abbots, the Gilbertines, Templars, Hospitallers, knights of shire, and burgesses were also summoned. On 28 March Charters were confirmed. Edward granted 20 Articles known as articuli super cartas; in return, one-twentieth was granted.
48th	26 September 1300	1300/1301	20 January 1301	30 February 1301	n/a	Roger Brabazon	Edward advised Canterbury that parliament must consider the Papal Bull. Met in Lincoln. Dissolved 27–30 January 1301. Nadir of Edward I's reign. Parliament was held at Lincoln. 17 abbots drew exempt certificates. 9 earls, 80 barons, 23 judges and court officials. The Commons were the same as summoned in previous parliament minus the deceased. Perambulation reports were submitted for Charter of Forests, in 22 constituencies where representatives were paid expenses. Earl of Lincoln was sent on embassy to Rome. Brabazon was appointed 'spokesman of the King'. Without "disinheriting the Crown ...a bill of the prelates and magnates presented to the King on behalf of the whole community in the parliament at Lincoln." A one-fifteenth tax was granted. On 30 January the Commons were dismissed.
49th	2 June 1302	n/a	1 July 1302	...	?	n/a	King Edward I held the parliament at Kilkenny, Ireland. All the bishops, earls, 44 abbots, and 83 barons were summoned.
50th	14 July 1302	1302	29 September 1302	21 October 1302	?	unknown	All usual parliaments were summoned 14, 20 and 24 July 1302, except the lower clergy. Met in London. On 7 November the King's writ demanded feudal aid uncollected from 1290.
51st			25 June 1303	...	?	n/a	42 representatives from London and other towns joined the Lords at York. They agreed to an increase in the Levy on Wool and the Customs Duties. On 21 March Lords were prorogued by the King; but parliament was still in session on 6 April.
52nd	12 November 1304	1304/1305	28 February 1305	20 March 1305	?	unknown	Edward demanded taxation for his war in Scotland, "...the king of his grace would command that they should have their scutages as the king and his council shall ordain...and others who owe the king service on Knights fees. Edward petitioned the Lords to grant Tallage. Nicholas de Segrave was tried in Lords "charged upon their homage, fealty and allegiance, to advise him faithfully what he should be the penalty" for cowardice. Segrave humbly begged forgiveness admitting guilt. The penalty was death, which was commuted to imprisonment, 8 barons were soon released on recognizances. 3 "discreet men" were among the knights summoned were royal officials of Exchequer. Parliament was held at York House, now Whitehall.
53rd	26 March 1305	n/a	15 July 1305	15 September 1305	?	unknown	met at London. After several prorogations the king arrived on 24 September. They discussed "an ordinance for the settlement of Scotland."
54th	5 April 1306	1306	30 May 1306	30 May 1306	?	unknown	Assembled at Westminster a week after Whit Sunday. A full parliament met and dissolved 30 May 1306. Four abbesses were summoned. Parliament was expected to grant a feudal aid; and a normal tax on movables was granted. "Citizens and burgesses and communities of all the cities and boroughs of the realm and the tenants of our demesne." The Commons voted one-twentieth. There were two proxy summons.
55th	3 November 1306	1306/1307	20 January 1307	31 March 1307	?	unknown	Writs sent from Lanercost Priory. Parliament met in Carlisle to "treat of the ordering and settling of the land of Scotland...and the state of his kingdom." Bishop of Winchester was excused long distance to travel. A full parliament was writ including 2 knights of shire and 2 burgesses from every city and borough. Deemed dissolved when writs de expensis were issued 20 January 1307 (burgesses only), and 19 March 1307 (knights only). On 20 March the Statute of Carlisle was sealed.

== Parliaments of Edward II ==
No.	Summoned	Elected	Assembled	Dissolved	Sessions	Presiding Officer (Note: The presiding officer of the House of Commons was initially known as the "Prolocutor" and sometimes as the Parlour, but the term most often used was "Speaker" and this became the title always used from the 1540s onwards.)	Note
1st	26 August 1307	1307	13 October 1307	16 October 1307	?	unknown	Met at Northampton. Statute of Winchester was finally sent to Ireland.
2nd	19 January 1308	1308	3 March 1308	...	?	unknown	On 25 February 1308, Edward II was unlawfully crowned by the Bishop of Winchester during a parliamentary sitting, in absence of Archbishop of Canterbury. The nobles signed a secret agreement at Boulogne to work together; it immediately challenged royal authority. Baronial coercion of the king was treason, punishable by death; a recension of the Ordo of the coronation oath.
3rd (Note: No commoners were summoned.)	19 January 1308	n/a	3 March 1308	...	?	n/a	Elder statesman the Earl of Lincoln drafts document declaring allegiance is owed to the Crown, and not ad personam the king. Prorogued to quindene 28 April 1308. The Earl of Lincoln's Homage et serment was a tirade against Piers Gaveston, the king's friend. Archbishop Winchelsey excommunicated Gaveston for disinheriting and impoverishing the Crown.
4th	16 August 1308	n/a	20 October 1308	...	?	n/a	Held at Westminster
5th	4 March 1309	1309	27 April 1309	13 May 1309	?	unknown	"The Community of the Realm" met at Westminster. A new list of 81 baronial names was drawn up for the Lords. There were deep grievances against the articles about illegal courts and misuse of writs, but quite how this was the sole concern of knights and burgesses, historians have never discovered, since they may have been drawn up as petitions "by a combination of knights, burgesses, and magnates."
6th	11 June 1309	n/a	27 July 1309	...	?	n/a	The Stamford assembly summoned the lay barons and higher clergy. On 20 August, the king issued the Statute of Stamford. Writs were issued for the one-twenty-fifth tax to be collected, but Gloucester, Lincoln and Cornwall petitioned the king. Gloucester assisted the king in mediating life earldom of Cornwall for Gaveston with House of Lords. Lincoln persuaded Warenne to accept Gaveston's peerage.
7th	26 October 1309	n/a	8 February 1310	12 April 1310	?	n/a	Parliament that met at Westminster was served with petition against the disinheritance and dishonour of the King and his power. Preamble warned against the squandering of it. One-twentieth was awarded for war with Scots.
8th	16 June 1311	1311	8 August 1311	18 December 1311	?	unknown	Met in London. The New Ordinances were drafted and completed within time allotted of 18 months. Preliminary ordinances included maintenance of church franchisees, ordered observance of Magna Carta. Three substantive clauses tackled the King's debts. Customs dues were reserved for natives, and delivered to the Exchequer. Clause 34 and 38 regulated unfairness in courts. On 5 October, the king signed all the clauses into law. Ordinances were a short-lived victory for Lancaster.
9th	3 June 1312	1312	20 August 1312	16 December 1312	2	unknown	Originally to meet on 23 July, but delayed for a month when it met at Westminster. Although prohibited (4 Aug.) to bear arms, magnates marched towards London on 16 August. The anti-pope's two envoys invited to attend. French clerks drafted Edward's objections to Ordinances based on legal precedents in the Mise of Amiens (1264). Prima Tractation as Pacem Confirmandam and the Rationes Baronum were signed in the Cardinal's room in London on 20 December 1312. On the last day the king imposed a Tallage of one-tenth and one-fifteenth on movables, although collection of revenue payments was very slow.
10th	8 January 1313	1313	18 March 1313	9 May 1313	?	unknown	The king, who was at Windsor, feigned illness. The magnates failed to appear in person.
11th	23 May 1313	1313	8 July 1313	27 July 1313	?	unknown	Abortive parliament was summoned but did not sit.
12th	26 July 1313	1313	23 September 1313	15 November 1313	2	unknown	Taxation granted due to be collected by 24 June 1314. Edward II issued writ of summons to meet on 21 April 1314, intended to discuss Scotland further. The parliament was not held in the end, Edward cancelled it on 24 March.
13th	29 July 1314	1314	9 September 1314	27/28 September 1314	?	unknown	88 lay magnates summoned to attend the Lords. Grant of one-fifteenth was made. Clerical one-tenth sent for urgently to pay for war in Scotland.
14th	24 October 1314	1314/1315	20 January 1315	9 March 1315	?	unknown	Met at Lincoln. This parliament heard a list of grievances. An historical list of complaints about the clergy, Articuli Cleri, was presented. Grants of land to the church were prohibited by mortmain. On 4 December, the Exchequer was required to list all gifts and grants contrary to ordinances. Twelve northern Lords excused.
15th	16 October 1315	1315/1316	27 January 1316	20 February 1316	?	unknown	The Parliament of 1316 was delayed five months before it finally met in Lincoln. The full parliament did not get underway until Thomas, Earl of Lancaster arrived on 12 February 1316. Lancaster was interrogated, pardoned, and the petition was heard. Exemptions were granted to six abbots.
16th	1317				?	unknown	The Lincoln Parliament witnessed the king's clash with rebellious barons led by Lancaster, who was summoned but never showed up.
17th	27 January 1318	n/a					In theory Parliament was summoned to Lincoln, but it was twice postponed on 12 March and 26 June. The writs were abandoned, probably because of the Scots invasion. The Earl of Lancaster and the Earl of Warenne were in a feud. On 8 June, Lancaster demanded all his lands in Yorkshire and north Wales must be returned by reversion.
18th		n/a	12 April 1318		?	unknown	The parliament met at Leicester on the Wednesday before Palm Sunday. It was a "parliament" in a technical sense because the king was not present. The archbishop, five bishops, three earls, and 28 barons attended. The two despensers and 200 armed knights were to be retained by Lancaster for life. Lancaster and the earls wanted the king to accept the "Ordinances" safeguarding their lands and estates. Pembroke and Hereford were sympathetic to Lancaster; the other magnates were Curialists. On 8 June, the king yielded to approving the Leicester Agreement in principle. The commission's articles of ordinance was not repealed; but there was no prohibition of others save by barons consent in Parliament. Lancaster made usual complaints about "evil counsellors".
19th	24–25 August 1318	1318	20 October 1318	9 December 1318	?	unknown	Parliament convened at York on 15 August 1318, the archbishop excommunicated Robert the Bruce for capture of Norham Castle and garrison. It aimed to implement the Treaty of Leake where the "conciliar system" was tested by Lancaster, so that it did not embarrass the king. Bishops in Middle Party wanted peace above all else. Lancaster finally turned up to answer charges against him: was acquitted, if he dropped the mitigation claims. On 16 November, per concilium Middle Party replaced Hereford and Pembroke's candidate Walwayn as Treasurer after only five months in office. On 6 December, the Ordinance of York became the Statute of York, Treasurer Northburgh was sent to London to treat with the Curia Regis "de statu hospicii." Lancaster was paid for 'debts' owed for king's service.
20th	20 March 1319	1319	6 May 1319	25 May 1319	1	unknown	Parliament met at York. On 10 June, parliament ordered the muster at Newcastle. Lancaster assumed the Stewardship and brought an armed retinue to York. Lancaster relied on the stewardship being hereditary.
21st	6 November 1319	n/a	20 January 1320	...	?	n/a	Parliament summoned to York confined to clergy and baronage; it did not have the authority to call a truce with the Scots. In cameris the Lords met locus occultus – in secret chambers without the Commons. But two archbishops, sixteen bishops, thirty abbots and priors, nine earls and 98 barons, judges, knights, or burgesses.
22nd	5 August 1320	1320	6 October 1320	25/26 October 1320	?	unknown	The king's character was very much under keen scrutiny. The archbishop, 17 suffragans, earls, barons, and lords were present. Edward II was highly praised by Cardinal Vitale Dufour, the papal legate.
23rd	15 May 1321	1321	15 July 1321	22 August 1321	?	unknown	Known as the Parliament of Whitebands, only 38 barons were summoned, after the Lancastrians defeat. A new baronial list included 8 new names: Hereford had converted to Lancaster's side. Tract of the Office of the Steward was a process against the Despensers, and attempt to remove evil counsellors over the head of the king.
24th	14 March 1322	1322	2 May 1322	19 May 1322	?	unknown	The Convocation was assembled by the Archbishop while the king insisted all clergy should attend. It was "an astonishing sight and sound", thought the Abbot of Peterborough, since Edward's summons had "caused great offence."
25th	18 September 1322	1322	14 November 1322	29 November 1322	?	unknown	Met in York.
26th	20 November 1323	1323/1324	23 February 1324	18 March 1324	?	unknown	49 barons were summoned, but parliament at Westminster was substituted and Colloquium abandoned.
27th	6 May 1325	1325	25 June 1325	...	?	unknown	Only MPs for the Cinque Ports were summoned with the 50 barons. The parliament that met in London was twice prorogued.
28th	10 October 1325	1325	18 November 1325	5 December 1325	?	unknown	The last parliament that accepted the knight representatives of the King Edward II's Seal. Owing to the war with France only 38 barons were able to attend. Parliament ordered the confiscation of Queen Isabella's estates, after she had escaped her guardian to flee to France.
29th	3 December 1326	1326/1327	7 January 1327	...	?	William Trussell	This Westminster parliament had been summoned on 27 October in a writ issued "in the name of the King" by Queen Isabella, to meet on 14 December, then postponed by another writ on 3 December following the King's arrest and imprisonment. The Parliament opened, without the King and continued after the forced abdication of King Edward II on 13 January (Feast of St Hilary). The members included 46 barons of whom only 26 had sat in 1325, as well as twenty magnates and nineteen abbots and priors. It was the first parliament in which members were paid to sit. According to the Lichfield Chronicler it was not technically a parliament without the king's presence. On 24 January, Roger Mortimer reported the king's abdication to Parliament. The next day Parliament sat in stunned silence as a deputation that included Henry, 3rd Earl of Lancaster read out the abdication notice and Edward III was acclaimed king for a second time. Edward was crowned by Parliament on 1 February 1327. Some historians believe Forma Deposicionis took place in parliamento.

== Parliaments of Edward III ==
No.	Summoned	Elected	Assembled	Dissolved	Sessions	Presiding Officer (Note: The presiding officer of the House of Commons was initially known as the "Prolocutor" and sometimes as the Parlour, but the term most often used was "Speaker" and this became the title always used from the 1540s onwards.)	Note
1st	...	...	...	9 March 1327	?	William Trussell	Continued from the last reign.
2nd	7 August 1327	1327	15 September 1327	23 September 1327	?	William Trussell	Westminster was very poorly attended, absentees cited war with the Scots.
3rd	10 December 1327	1327/1328	7 February 1328	5 March 1328	?	unknown	Met at Lincoln. 'The Great Council' that met at Winchester also included some of the Commons summoned as well as the Lords, as a continuation of Edward II's parliaments.
4th	5 March 1328	1328	24 April 1328	14 May 1328	?	unknown	Met at Northampton, and moved on to Council at York (July 1328).
5th	28 August 1328	1328	16 October 1328	22 February 1329	1	unknown	May have met at Salisbury, The Justice Eyre (of 1294) was revived and adjourned to Westminster for February 1329. Escaping execution for treason, Lancaster was fined Cognizance of £10,000, but it was never paid. Lancaster's insistence upon upholding Ordinances brought England to the brink of civil war.
6th	25 January 1330	1330	11 March 1330	21 March 1330	?	unknown	Met at York.
7th	23 October 1330	1330	26 November 1330	9 December 1330	?	unknown	Met at New Sarum (Salisbury).
8th	16 July 1331	1331	30 September 1331	9 October 1331	?	unknown	Parliament met at Westminster where a violent quarrel broke out between Lords Zouche and Grey; Zouche was wounded and both bound over to keep the peace. But Grey was pardoned by the magnates.
9th	27 January 1332	1332	16 March 1332	21 March 1332	?	Henry de Beaumont	Met at Winchester. A list of 31 abbots and priors was added to Parliaments of 1330s. Writs of Praemunientes were sent to the bishops and Mandamus to the two archbishops. The Proctors of Clergy (31 abbots and priors) attended.
10th	20 July 1332	1332	9 September 1332	12 September 1332	?	Geoffrey le Scrope	met at Westminster, the king abandoned the Tallage of one-fourteenth of movables and one-ninth of revenues. The King wanted to hear petitions in the North, and to deal with the Scots. On 12 September expenses were ordered paid to knights of shire. Citizens and burgesses granted one-tenth on movables. John Darcy was appointed Justiciar of Ireland (1332–7) and dropped from the baronial lists in parliament.
11th	20 October 1332	1332	4 December 1332	27 January 1333	2	unknown	Geoffrey Scrope, Chief Justice acted as the 'King's spokesman' in Commons. Prelates and lay barons deliberated together in one chamber for first recorded occasion. The Lords were ordered to collect Feudal aid for expenses of the King's daughter's wedding.
12th	2 January 1334	1334	21 February 1334	2 March 1334	?	unknown	...
13th	24 July 1334	1334	19 September 1334	23 September 1334	?	unknown	Met at York. Another one-fifteenth and one-tenth was granted.
14th	1 April 1335	1335	26 May 1335	3 June 1335	?	unknown	Met at York.
15th	22 January 1336	1336	11 March 1336	20 March 1336	?	unknown	Met at York.
16th	29 November 1336	1336/1337	3 March 1337	c.16 March 1337	?	unknown	...
17th	20 December 1337	1337/1338	3 February 1338	14 February 1338	?	unknown	Met at Northampton.
18th	15 November 1338	1338/1339	3 February 1339	17 February 1339	?	unknown	...
19th	25 August 1339	1339	13 October 1339	c.3 November 1339	?	unknown	Met at Northampton.
20th	16 November 1339	1339/1340	20 January 1340	19 February 1340	1	William Trussell	Commons agreed to make a grant to the king but not without first consulting their constituents. The King wanted to go to war, and so had asked Lords to pressurise the Commons en chargeaunce manere.
21st	21 February 1340	1340	29 March 1340	10 May 1340	1	William Trussell	...
22nd	30 May 1340	1340	12 July 1340	26 July 1340	?	William Trussell	the Grandees consulted with chivalers des countees (knights of the shire) and marchandz in the Commons to raise a loan on Wool staples.
23rd	3 March 1341	1341	23 April 1341	27–28 May 1341	?	unknown	...
24th	24 February 1343	1343	28 April 1343	20 May 1343	?	William Trussell	...
25th	20 April 1344	1344	7 June 1344	28 June 1344	?	unknown	...
26th	30 July 1346	1346	11 September 1346	20 September 1346	?	unknown	Instrument that drew up taxes was usually Indenture by "the Commons with the assent of the Lords Spiritual and Temporal" until 1399 when the Commons became more independent on the usurpation with Parliament's consent.
27th	13 November 1347	1347/1348	14 January 1348	12 February 1348	?	William de Thorpe	21 bishops and 30 lay magnates met on the baronial lists. 4 new bannerets were "new men" made from knights.
28th	14 February 1348	1348	31 March 1348	13 April 1348	?	William de Thorpe	The same baronial list was summoned. Another parliament was planned for January 1349, but was cancelled. No parliament was held in 1349 due to bubonic and pneumonic plague.
29th	25 November 1350	1350/1351	9 February 1351	1 March 1351	?	William de Shareshull	...
30th	15 November 1351	1351/1352	13 January 1352	11 February 1352	?	William de Shareshull	...
31st	15 March 1354	1354	28 April 1354	20 May 1354	?	unknown	...
32nd	20 September 1355	1355	23 November 1355	30 November 1355	?	unknown	...
33rd	15 February 1357	1357	17 April 1357	8–16 May 1357	?	unknown	...
34th	15 December 1357	1357/1358	5 February 1358	27 February 1358	?	unknown	Seven bishops, six abbots, two priors, a dean, seven earls, four judges, and 68 barons made up the House of Lords to a total of 101. They helped negotiate the Treaty of Calais (1360).
35th	3 April 1360	1360	15 May 1360	...	?	unknown	...
36th	20 November 1360	1360/1361	24 January 1361	18 February 1361	?	unknown	...
37th	14 August 1362	1362	13 October 1362	17 November 1362	?	Henry Green	...
38th	1 June 1363	1363	6 October 1363	30 October 1363	?	unknown	...
39th	4 December 1364	1364/1365	20 January 1365	17 February 1365	?	unknown	...
40th	20 January 1366	1366	4 May 1366	11 May 1366	?	unknown	...
41st	24 February 1368	1368	1 May 1368	21 May 1368	?	unknown	...
42nd	6 April 1369	1369	3 June 1369	11 June 1369	?	unknown	...
43rd	8 January 1371	1371	24 February 1371	29 March 1371	?	unknown	...
44th	1 September 1372	1372	3 November 1372	24 November 1372	?	unknown	...
45th	4 October 1373	1373	21 November 1373	10 December 1373	?	unknown	Lords met in the White Chamber, Commons met in the Painted Chamber. Intercommuning took place in the Lord Chamberlain's Chambers.
46th	28 December 1375	1375/1376	28 April 1376	10 July 1376	?	Peter de la Mare	Known as the Good Parliament. Met at Westminster in the Painted Chamber "the commons, together and with one accord assembled, came before the king, prelates, and lords in the parliament chamber" known for the first time as "the house of parliament." Intercommuning took place by Commons invitation asked for a deputation of Lords to discuss the Chancellor's opening speech on 2 May.
47th	1 December 1376	1376/1377	27 January 1377	2 March 1377	?	Thomas Hungerford (Note: Hungerford was the first presiding officer of the Commons to be recorded as having the title of Speaker.)	Known as the Bad Parliament.

== Parliaments of Richard II ==
No.	Summoned	Elected	Assembled	Dissolved	Sessions	Speaker	Note
1st	4 August 1377	1377	13 October 1377	5 December 1377	?	Peter de la Mare	...
2nd	3 September 1378	1378	20 October 1378	16 November 1378	?	James Pickering	Met at Gloucester. First occasion of a speaker's 'protestation'.
3rd	16 February 1379	1379	24 April 1379	27 May 1379	?	unknown	...
4th	20 October 1379	1379/1380	16 January 1380	3 March 1380	?	John Guildesborough	...
5th	26 August 1380	1380	5 November 1380	6 December 1380	?	John Guildesborough	Met at Northampton. The Commons worked closely with the Lords to produce a poll tax at three groats per head: one-third was found by the clergy; but the Commons rate was lower than the five groats demanded by the Lords, proving the Commons authority over taxation.
6th	16 July 1381	1381	3 November 1381	25 February 1382	?	Richard Waldegrave	...
7th	24 March 1382	1382	7 May 1382	22 May 1382	...	Richard Waldegrave	Met at Westminster.
8th	9 August 1382	1382	6 October 1382	24 October 1382	?	Richard Waldegrave	...
9th	7 January 1383	1383	23 February 1383	10 March 1383	?	James Pickering	...
10th	20 August 1383	1383	26 October 1383	26 November 1383	?	?	...
11th	3 March 1384	1384	29 April 1384	27 May 1384	?	?	This session was held at Salisbury in the bishop's palace. A delegation of three bishops, three earls, three barons, and three royal brothers were intercommuning with the Commons assembled. The noisy, more numerous Commons visited the Lords' chamber.
12th	28 September 1384	1384	12 November 1384	14 December 1384	?	?	...
13th	3 September 1385	1385	20 October 1385	6 December 1385	?	?	...
14th	8 August 1386	1386	1 October 1386	28 November 1386	1	?	Known as the Wonderful Parliament.
15th	17 December 1387	1387/1388	3 February 1388	4 June 1388	2	?	Known as the Merciless Parliament or the Miraculous Parliament.
16th	28 July 1388	1388	9 September 1388	17 October 1388	1	?	92 knights and burgesses joined 54 returners from the Merciless Parliament when they met at Cambridge; but 104 were newcomers. A majority of the leaders were still in favour of Lords Appellant, 26 of whom had received a royal pardon.
17th	6 December 1389	1389/1390	17 January 1390	2 March 1390	1	?	...
18th	12 September 1390	1390	12 November 1390	3 December 1390	1	?	...
19th	7 September 1391	1391	3 November 1391	2 December 1391	1	unknown	Met at Westminster.
20th	23 November 1392	1392/1393	20 January 1393	10 February 1393	1	unknown	Met at Winchester.
21st	13 November 1393	1393/1394	27 January 1394	6 March 1394	1	John Bussy	Met at Westminster.
22nd	20 November 1394	1394/1395	27 January 1395	15 February 1395	1	John Bussy	Met at Westminster.
23rd	30 November 1396	1396/1397	22 January 1397	12 February 1397	1	John Bussy	This session was held at Westminster.
24th	18 July 1397	1397	17 September 1397	31 January 1398	2	John Bussy	Two sessions were held, one at Westminster and another session met at Shrewsbury. The Earl of Arundel was put on trial 'before his peers' in the Lords for treason. St Albans Chronicler complained the king had 'packed' the Commons with the court's knights of the shire. Many new sheriffs were Crown appointees in Sept 1397; the court's supporters were accused of intimidation and retaliation on the king's behalf. John Russel and Ivo Fitzwaryn could easily manipulate the less experienced members.
25th	19 August 1399	1399	30 September 1399	30 September 1399	1	Henry de Retford	Parliament met at Westminster the day after Richard II's abdication. It was used as the instrument of his deposition. Bolingbroke summoned a second parliament to meet less than a week later. Henry de Retford was elected by this parliament on 3 October; Henry IV crowned on 13 October.

== Parliaments of Henry IV ==
No.	Summoned	Elected	Assembled	Dissolved	Sessions	Speaker	Note
1st	30 September 1399	1399	6 October 1399	19 November 1399	1	John Cheyne	Summoned by Henry IV it was known as a Convention Parliament. Henry was crowned as quickly as possible on 13 October.
1st	30 September 1399	1399	6 October 1399	19 November 1399	1	John Doreward	Summoned by Henry IV it was known as a Convention Parliament. Henry was crowned as quickly as possible on 13 October.
2nd	9 September 1400	1400/1401	20 January 1401	10 March 1401	1	Arnold Savage	Called to meet at York, then prorogued, it actually met at Westminster.
3rd	19 June 1402	1402	30 September 1402	25 November 1402	1	Henry Redford	Commons intercommune with Lords as the new century sees more co-operation between the two houses, but not without the King's Special Grace.
4th	20 October 1403	1403/1404	14 January 1404	20 March 1404	1	Arnold Savage	...
5th	25 August 1404	1404	16 October 1404	13 November 1404	1	William Esturmy	Known as the Unlearned Parliament, the Lawless Parliament. The Parliament of Dunces or Parliamentum Indoctorum met at Coventry.
6th	21 December 1405	1405/1406	1 March 1406	22 December 1406	3	John Tiptoft	Known as the Long Parliament.; the autumn session was held at Gloucester.
7th	26 August 1407	1407	20 October 1407	2 December 1407	1	Thomas Chaucer	Met at Gloucester. The first occasion Lords and Commons clashed over primacy and initiating money bills. Lord Chancellor made opening speech on 24 October in the place of the King; but intercommuning did not take place until Monday, 14 November.
8th	26 October 1409	1409/1410	27 January 1410	9 May 1410	2	Thomas Chaucer	...
9th	21 September 1411	1411	3 November 1411	19 December 1411	1	Thomas Chaucer	...
10th	1 December 1412	1412/1413	3 February 1413	20 March 1413	1	unknown	...

== Parliaments of Henry V ==
No.	Summoned	Elected	Assembled	Dissolved	Sessions	Speaker	Note
1st	22 March 1413	1413	14 May 1413	9 June 1413	1	William Stourton	...
1st	22 March 1413	1413	14 May 1413	9 June 1413	1	John Doreward	...
2nd	1 December 1413	1413/1414	30 April 1414	29 May 1414	1	Walter Hungerford	Known as the Fire and Faggot Parliament. Met at the Greyfriars monastery in Leicester. Most notable for passing the Suppression of Heresy Act 1414.
3rd	26 September 1414	1414	19 November 1414	...	1	Thomas Chaucer	...
4th	12 August 1415	1415	4 November 1415	12 November 1415	1	Richard Redman	Known as the Parliament of 1415 it was the shortest of medieval English history.
5th	21 January 1416	1416	16 March 1416	May 1416	2	Walter Beauchamp	...
6th	3 September 1416	1416	19 October 1416	18 November 1416	1	Roger Flower	...
7th	5 October 1417	1417	16 November 1417	17 December 1417	1	Roger Flower	...
8th	24 August 1419	1419	16 October 1419	13 November 1419	1	Roger Flower	...
9th	21 October 1420	1420	2 December 1420	...	1	Roger Hunt	...
10th	26 February 1421	1421	2 May 1421	...	1	Thomas Chaucer	King Henry V was present in person made his assent known with words Le roi le voet, de Passent des seignurs...esteantz en ceste parlament, et a la requeste des ditz Communes, siccome est desiree par la dite petition en toutz points. (This seems to translate to "The king vows, with the taking of the Lords... present (?) in this Parlament, and at the request of the said Commons, as is desired by the said petition in all points.") It is unclear why the King of England would have addressed his fellow Englishmen in the French language, or the significance of this manner of giving assent. It is said that this led in 1429 statute to the historic 40 shilling qualification until 1832.
11th	20 October 1421	1421	1 December 1421	...	1	Richard Baynard	...

== Parliaments of Henry VI ==
No.	Summoned	Elected	Assembled	Dissolved	Sessions	Speaker	Note
1st	29 September 1422	1422	9 November 1422	18 December 1422	1	Roger Flower	In this reign Parliaments were opened with French phrase Soit fait come il est desire. (Note: "Be it as it is asked.")
2nd	1 September 1423	1423	20 October 1423	28 February 1424	2	John Russell	Roll derives the long form Soit il come est desire par la petition.
3rd	24 February 1425	1425	30 April 1425	14 July 1425	2	Thomas Walton	
4th	7 January 1426	1426	18 February 1426	1 June 1426	2	Richard Vernon	Parliament of Bats. Met at Leicester.
5th	15 July 1427	1427	13 October 1427	25 March 1428	2	John Tyrrell	...
6th	12 July 1429	1429	22 September 1429	23 February 1430	2	William Alington	...
7th	27 November 1430	1430/1431	12 January 1431	20 March 1431	1	John Tyrrell	...
8th	25 February 1432	1432	12 May 1432	17 July 1432	1	John Russell	...
9th	24 May 1433	1433	8 July 1433	>c.18 December 1433	2	Roger Hunt	...
10th	5 July 1435	1435	10 October 1435	23 December 1435	1	John Bowes	...
11th	29 October 1436	1436/1437	21 January 1437	27 March 1437	1	John Tyrrell	...
11th	29 October 1436	1436/1437	21 January 1437	27 March 1437	1	William Burley	...
12th	26 September 1439	1439	12 November 1439	c.15–24 February 1440	2	William Tresham	...
13th	3 December 1441	1441/1442	25 January 1442	27 March 1442	1	William Tresham	...
14th	13 January 1445	1445	25 February 1445	9 April 1445	4	William Burley	...
15th	14 December 1446	1446/1447	10 February 1447	3 March 1447	1	William Tresham	...
16th	2 January 1449	1449	12 February 1449	16 July 1449	3	John Say	...
17th	23 September 1449	1449	6 November 1449	c.5–8 June 1450	4	John Popham	...
17th	23 September 1449	1449	6 November 1449	c.5–8 June 1450	4	William Tresham	...
18th	5 September 1450	1450	6 November 1450	c.24–31 May 1451	3	William Oldhall	...
19th	20 January 1453	1453	6 March 1453	c.16–21 April 1454	4	Thomas Thorpe	...
19th	20 January 1453	1453	6 March 1453	c.16–21 April 1454	4	Thomas Charlton	...
20th	26 May 1455	1455	9 July 1455	12 March 1456	?	John Wenlock	...
21st	9 October 1459	1459	20 November 1459	20 December 1459	?	Thomas Tresham	Parliament of Devils. Met at Coventry.
22nd	30 July 1460	1460	7 October 1460	c.4 March 1461	?	John Green	Passes Act of accord in October 1460
22nd	30 July 1460	1460	7 October 1460	c.4 March 1461	?	James Strangeways of West Harlsey and Whorlton.	Passes Act of accord in October 1460
23rd	15 October 1470	1470	26 November 1470	c. 11 April 1471	?	unknown	This Parliament was held during the Readeption of Henry VI, a period when King Henry VI was restored to the throne. It ended when King Edward IV deposed Henry for the second time.

== Parliaments of Edward IV ==
No.	Summoned	Elected	Assembled	Dissolved	Sessions	Speaker	Note
1st	23 May 1461	1461	4 November 1461	6 May 1462	2	James Strangeways	Parliament announced the new king and attainted the old, reversing all the legislation against the Yorkist claim. It annulled the compromise of 1459 drawn up in Coventry. It enabled the arrest and detention of Lancastrian enemies at Edward's request. The Lancastrian stronghold of Harlech Castle was captured, and the session ended on 21 December. Another session opened on 6 May 1462, but the king and nobles were absent, so Archbishop Bourchier dissolved it.
2nd	22 December 1462	1462/1463	29 April 1463	28 March 1465	?	John Say	On petition Indenture by Statute of 1465 transferred taxation directly to Treasurer of Calais until city's loss in 1558. Subsidy-indentures became common after 1465.
3rd	28 February 1467	1467	3 June 1467	7 June 1468	?	John Say	
4th	19 August 1472	1472	6 October 1472	14 March 1475	7	William Allington	In 1473 Indenture could not be 'granted' because the specific presence of the King was required for such petitions.
5th	20 November 1477	1477/1478	16 January 1478	26 February 1478	1	William Allington	
6th	15 November 1482	1482/1483	20 January 1483	18 February 1483	1	John Wood	It is not clear if the 6th Parliament was prorogued or dissolved on 18 February. A new Parliament, or possibly a second session of the 6th Parliament, was expected to assemble in June, but the king's death prevented it.

== Parliament of Richard III ==
No.	Summoned	Elected	Assembled	Dissolved	Sessions	Speaker
1st	9 December 1483	1483/1484	23 January 1484	20 February 1484	1	William Catesby

== Parliaments of Henry VII ==
No.	Summoned	Elected	Assembled	Dissolved	Sessions	Speaker
1st	15 September 1485	1485	7 November 1485	c. 4 March 1486	1	Thomas Lovell
2nd	...	1487	9 November 1487	c. 18 December 1487	1	John Mordaunt
3rd	...	?1488/1489	13 January 1489	27 February 1490	1	Thomas fitzWilliam
4th	12 August 1491	1491	17 October 1491	5 March 1492	1	Richard Empson
5th	15 September 1495	1495	14 October 1495	21–22 December 1495	1	Robert Drury
6th	20 November 1496	1496/1497	16 January 1497	13 March 1497	1	Thomas Englefield
7th	...	?1503/1504	25 January 1504	c. 1 April 1504	1	Edmund Dudley

== Parliaments of Henry VIII ==
No.	Summoned	Elected	Assembled	Dissolved	Sessions	Speaker	Note
1st	17 October 1509	1509/1510	21 January 1510	23 February 1510	1	Thomas Englefield	...
2nd	28 November 1511	1511/1512	4 February 1512	4 March 1514	4	Robert Sheffield	...
3rd	23 November 1514	1514/1515	5 February 1515	22 December 1515	2	Thomas Neville	...
4th	...	1523	15 April 1523	13 August 1523	3	Thomas More	Known as the Black Parliament
5th	9 August 1529	1529	3 November 1529	14 April 1536	9	Thomas Audley	Reformation Parliament
5th	9 August 1529	1529	3 November 1529	14 April 1536	9	Humphrey Wingfield	Reformation Parliament
5th	9 August 1529	1529	3 November 1529	14 April 1536	9	Richard Rich	Reformation Parliament
6th	27 April 1536	1536	8 June 1536	18 July 1536	1	Richard Rich	...
7th	1 March 1539	1539	28 April 1539	24 July 1540	3	Nicholas Hare	...
8th	23 November 1541	1541/1542	16 January 1542	28 March 1544	3	Thomas Moyle	...
9th	1 December 1544	1544/1545	23 November 1545	31 January 1547	2	Thomas Moyle	...

== Parliaments of Edward VI ==
No.	Summoned	Elected	Assembled	Dissolved	Sessions	Speaker
1st	2 August 1547	1547	4 November 1547	15 April 1552	4	John Baker
2nd	5 January 1553	1553	1 March 1553	31 March 1553	1	James Dyer

== Parliaments of Mary I ==
No.	Summoned	Elected	Assembled	Dissolved	Sessions	Speaker
1st	14 August 1553	1553	5 October 1553	5 December 1553	1	John Pollard
2nd	17 February 1554	1554	2 April 1554	5 May 1554	1	Robert Broke
3rd	3 October 1554	1554	12 November 1554	16 January 1555	1	Clement Higham
4th	3 September 1555	1555	21 October 1555	9 December 1555	1	John Pollard
5th	6 December 1557	1557/1558	20 January 1558	17 November 1558	2	William Cordell

== Parliaments of Elizabeth I ==
No.	Summoned	Elected	Assembled	Dissolved	Sessions	Speaker
1st	5 December 1558	1558/1559	23 January 1559	8 May 1559	1	Thomas Gargrave
2nd	10 November 1562	1562/1563	11 January 1563	2 January 1567	2	Thomas Williams
2nd	10 November 1562	1562/1563	11 January 1563	2 January 1567	2	Richard Onslow
3rd	17 February 1571	1571	2 April 1571	29 May 1571	1	Christopher Wray
4th	28 March 1572	1572	8 May 1572	19 April 1583	3	Robert Bell
4th	28 March 1572	1572	8 May 1572	19 April 1583	3	John Popham
5th	12 October 1584	1584	23 November 1584	14 September 1585	2	John Puckering
6th	15 September 1586	1586	15 October 1586	23 March 1587	2	John Puckering
7th	18 September 1588	1588/1589	4 February 1589	29 March 1589	1	Thomas Snagge
8th	4 January 1593	1593	18 February 1593	10 April 1593	1	Edward Coke
9th	23 August 1597	1597	24 October 1597	9 February 1598	2	Christopher Yelverton
10th	11 September 1601	1601	27 October 1601	19 December 1601	1	John Croke

== Parliaments of James I ==
No.	Summoned	Elected	Assembled	Dissolved	Sessions	Speaker	Note
1st	31 January 1604	1604	19 March 1604	9 February 1611	5	Edward Phelips	Blessed Parliament
2nd	19 February 1614	1614	5 April 1614	7 June 1614	1	Randolph Crewe	Addled Parliament
3rd	13 November 1620	1621	16 January 1621	8 February 1622	2	Thomas Richardson	
4th	30 December 1623	1624	12 February 1624	27 March 1625	1	Thomas Crewe	Happy Parliament

== Parliaments of Charles I ==
The Long Parliament, which commenced in this reign, had the longest term and the most complex history of any English Parliament. The entry in the first table below relates to the whole Parliament. Although it rebelled against King Charles I and continued to exist long after the King's death, it was a Parliament he originally summoned. An attempt has been made to set out the different phases of the Parliament in the second table in this section and in subsequent sections. The phases are explained in a note.

No.	Summoned	Elected	Assembled	Dissolved	Sessions	Speaker	Note
1st	2 April 1625	1625	17 May 1625	12 August 1625	2	Thomas Crewe	Useless Parliament
2nd	26 December 1625	1626	6 February 1626	15 June 1626	1	Heneage Finch	...
3rd	31 January 1628	1628	17 March 1628	10 March 1629	2	John Finch	Supplanted by Personal Rule
4th	20 February 1640	1640	13 April 1640	5 May 1640	1	John Glanville	Short Parliament
5th	24 September 1640	1640	3 November 1640	16 March 1660	...	William Lenthall	Long Parliament (Note: Speakers of the Long Parliament (including times when it sat as the Rump Parliament): Lenthall 3 November 1640 – 26 July 1647; Pelham 30 July 1647 – 5 August 1647; Lenthall 6 August 1647 – 20 April 1653 (restored to the Chair by the Army and sat until Oliver Cromwell dissolved the Rump Parliament) and 26 December 1653 – 13 January 1660 (when the Rump was restored); Say 13 January 1660 – 21 January 1660 and Lenthall 21 January 1660 – 16 March 1660.)
5th	24 September 1640	1640	3 November 1640	16 March 1660	...	Henry Pelham	Long Parliament
5th	24 September 1640	1640	3 November 1640	16 March 1660	...	William Lenthall	Long Parliament
5th	24 September 1640	1640	3 November 1640	16 March 1660	...	William Say (Deputy)	Long Parliament
5th	24 September 1640	1640	3 November 1640	16 March 1660	...	William Lenthall	Long Parliament

=== The Long Parliament (Royalist phases) ===
No.	Summoned	Elected	Assembled	Dissolved	Sessions	Speaker	Note
5th 'a' (Note: Phase 'a' of the Long Parliament was when it functioned as a conventional Parliament, requiring the assent of King Charles I to legislation. An unusual feature was that a law was enacted providing that this Parliament could not be lawfully dissolved without its own consent. This phase ended when the King raised his standard (22 August 1642) and commenced the English Civil War. The day before this event is the date inserted in the Dissolved column.)	24 September 1640	1640	3 November 1640	21 August 1642	1	William Lenthall	Long Parliament
5th 'c' (Note: Phase 'c' of the Long Parliament was the King's Oxford Parliament. The King was unable to lawfully dissolve the Long Parliament, without its consent, so he summoned the members to meet at Oxford. Royalists and those interested in trying to settle the Civil War by compromise attended the meetings, which were in opposition to the revolutionary body (phase 'b' of the Long Parliament, see below) sitting concurrently at Westminster. The date of the first meeting is given in the Assembled column and of the last sitting in the Dissolved column.)	...	...	22 January 1644	10 March 1645	2	Sampson Eure	King's Oxford Parliament

== Parliaments of the Revolution and Commonwealth ==
No.	Summoned	Elected	Assembled	Dissolved	Sessions	Speaker	Note
1st 'b'	...	...	22 August 1642	5 December 1648	1	William Lenthall	Long Parliament (Note: This was phase 'b' of the Long Parliament, when it functioned as a revolutionary Parliament, after the start of the English Civil War. Parliament assumed the power to legislate by Ordinance, without needing Royal assent. This phase ended with Pride's Purge, which converted the Long Parliament into the Rump Parliament. In 1644 the King summoned the Long Parliament to meet at Oxford. Those members who responded constituted the King's Oxford Parliament (phase c of the Parliament, see the previous section), in opposition to the revolutionary Parliament which continued to sit at the Palace of Westminster. The date in the Assembled column is the day when King Charles I raised his standard and commenced the English Civil War. The date in the Dissolved column is the day before Pride's Purge, when the full Long Parliament last met (until the Purge was reversed on 21 February 1660).)
1st 'b'	...	...	22 August 1642	5 December 1648	1	Henry Pelham	Long Parliament
1st 'b'	...	...	22 August 1642	5 December 1648	1	William Lenthall	Long Parliament
1st 'd'	...	...	6 December 1648	20 April 1653	1	William Lenthall	Rump Parliament (Note: This was phase 'd' of the Long Parliament, known as the Rump Parliament. During this period the Army only permitted selected members to continue to participate. The House of Lords was abolished (6 February 1649) as was the monarchy (7 February 1649). Thereafter the Rump of the House of Commons was the only remaining element of Parliament. It legislated the Commonwealth of England into existence on 19 May 1649. The date of Pride's Purge is given in the Assembled column and the date when Oliver Cromwell dissolved the Rump by force is in the Dissolved column.)
2nd	20 June 1653	n/a	4 July 1653	12 December 1653	1	Francis Rous	Barebone's Parliament (Note: The Little or Barebone's Parliament was an appointed body.)

== Parliaments of the Protectorate ==
No.	Summoned	Elected	Assembled	Dissolved	Sessions	Speaker	Note
1st	1 June 1654	1654	3 September 1654	22 January 1655	1	William Lenthall	1st Protectorate Parliament
2nd	10 July 1656	1656	17 September 1656	4 February 1658	2	Thomas Widdrington	2nd Protectorate Parliament
2nd	10 July 1656	1656	17 September 1656	4 February 1658	2	Bulstrode Whitelocke	2nd Protectorate Parliament
3rd	9 December 1658	1658/1659	27 January 1659	22 April 1659	1	Chaloner Chute	3rd Protectorate Parliament
3rd	9 December 1658	1658/1659	27 January 1659	22 April 1659	1	Lislebone Long (Deputy)	3rd Protectorate Parliament
3rd	9 December 1658	1658/1659	27 January 1659	22 April 1659	1	Thomas Bampfylde	3rd Protectorate Parliament

These parliaments included representatives of Scotland and Ireland.

No.	Summoned	Elected	Assembled	Dissolved	Sessions	Speaker	Note
4th 'e'	...	...	7 May 1659	13 October 1659	1	William Lenthall	Rump Parliament (restored) (Note: This was phase 'e' of the Long Parliament. The Army restored the Rump Parliament, to liquidate the Protectorate and re-establish the Commonwealth regime.)

== Parliaments of the Commonwealth ==
No.	Summoned	Elected	Assembled	Dissolved	Sessions	Speaker	Note
1st 'f'	...	...	26 December 1659	20 February 1660	1	William Lenthall	Rump Parliament (Note: This was phase 'f' of the Long Parliament, with the Rump Parliament running the restored Commonwealth regime.)
1st 'f'	...	...	26 December 1659	20 February 1660	1	William Say (Deputy)	Rump Parliament
1st 'f'	...	...	26 December 1659	20 February 1660	1	William Lenthall	Rump Parliament
1st 'g'	...	...	21 February 1660	16 March 1660	1	William Lenthall	Long Parliament (Note: This was phase 'g' of the Long Parliament. Pride's Purge was reversed and the full Long Parliament made arrangements for a Convention Parliament and then dissolved itself.)

== Parliaments of Charles II ==
No.	Summoned	Elected	Assembled	Dissolved	Sessions	Speaker	Note
1st	16 March 1660	1660	25 April 1660	29 December 1660	1	Harbottle Grimston	The Convention Parliament assembled without a royal warrant. After the restoration of the monarchy, of which this parliament was a key enabler, it was retrospectively recognised as a parliament by Charles II
2nd	18 February 1661	1661	8 May 1661	24 January 1679	17	Edward Turnour	Cavalier Parliament
2nd	18 February 1661	1661	8 May 1661	24 January 1679	17	Job Charlton	Cavalier Parliament
2nd	18 February 1661	1661	8 May 1661	24 January 1679	17	Edward Seymour	Cavalier Parliament
2nd	18 February 1661	1661	8 May 1661	24 January 1679	17	Robert Sawyer	Cavalier Parliament
3rd	25 January 1679	1679	6 March 1679	12 July 1679	2	William Gregory	Habeas Corpus Parliament
4th	24 July 1679	1679	21 October 1680	18 January 1681	1	William Williams	Exclusion Bill Parliament
5th	20 January 1681	1681	21 March 1681	28 March 1681	1	William Williams	Oxford Parliament

== Parliament of James II ==
No.	Summoned	Elected	Assembled	Dissolved	Sessions	Speaker	Note
1st	14 February 1685	1685	19 May 1685	2 July 1687	1	John Trevor	Loyal Parliament

== Parliaments of William III and Mary II ==
No.	Summoned	Elected	Assembled	Dissolved	Sessions	Speaker	Note
1st	29 December 1688	1688–89	22 January 1689	6 February 1690	2	Henry Powle	The Convention Parliament of 1689 was not summoned by King James II, who was outside the country, but by the future William III. On 12 February 1689, the Convention decided that James had abdicated by fleeing the capital on 18 December 1688 and by throwing the Great Seal of the Realm into the River Thames and offered the throne jointly to William III and Mary II, who accepted it. The Convention converted itself to a formal parliament on 13 February, and legal records use that date as the official start date of the parliament.
2nd	6 February 1690	1690	20 March 1690	11 October 1695	6	John Trevor	
3rd	12 October 1695	1695	22 November 1695	7 July 1698	3	Paul Foley	
4th	13 July 1698	1698	24 August 1698	19 December 1700	2	Thomas Littleton	
5th	26 December 1700	1700/1701	6 February 1701	11 November 1701	1	Robert Harley	
6th	3 November 1701	1701	30 December 1701	2 July 1702	1	Robert Harley	

- Note: The Convention Parliament of 1689 is usually referred to as the 1st Parliament of William & Mary and thus the 1690 parliament is referred to as the "Second Parliament". The very first act of the 1690 parliament (2 Will. & Mar., c.1) was to legitimise the Convention parliament as a lawfully-summoned parliament.
- Note: Queen Mary II died in December 1694, during the sixth session of the second parliament. Subsequent parliamentary sessions are labelled as "William III" alone (rather than "William & Mary"), but their numbering is not reset. The next parliament (1695) is conventionally called the "third parliament", the 1698 parliament the "fourth parliament" etc.

== Parliaments of Anne ==
No.	Summoned	Elected	Assembled	Dissolved	Sessions	Speaker
1st	2 July 1702	1702	20 August 1702	5 April 1705	3	Robert Harley
2nd	2 May 1705	1705	14 July 1705	3 April 1707	3	John Smith

On 29 April 1707, the Parliament of Great Britain was constituted. The members of the 2nd Parliament of Queen Anne became part of the 1st Parliament of Great Britain.

== See also ==
- Duration of English parliaments before 1660
- Duration of English, British and United Kingdom parliaments from 1660
- List of acts of the Parliament of England
- Lists of MPs elected to the English parliament
  - List of MPs elected to the English parliament in 1593
  - List of MPs elected to the English parliament in 1597
  - List of MPs elected to the English parliament in 1601
  - List of MPs elected to the English parliament in 1604
  - List of MPs elected to the English parliament in 1614
  - List of MPs elected to the English parliament in 1621
  - List of MPs elected to the English parliament in 1624
  - List of MPs elected to the English parliament in 1625
  - List of MPs elected to the English parliament in 1626
  - List of MPs elected to the English parliament in 1628
  - List of MPs elected to the English parliament in April 1640
  - List of MPs elected to the English parliament in November 1640
  - List of MPs elected to the English parliament in 1654
  - List of MPs elected to the English parliament in 1656
  - List of MPs elected to the English parliament in 1659
  - List of MPs elected to the English Parliament in 1660
  - List of MPs elected to the English Parliament in 1661
  - List of MPs elected to the English Parliament in 1705
- List of British governments
- List of parliaments of Great Britain
- List of parliaments of the United Kingdom
- Regnal years of English monarchs

== Sources ==
- Carpenter, David (2015). Crook, D.; Wilkinson, L.J. (eds.). Between Magna Carta and the Parliamentary State. Woodbridge.
- Chew, H.M.; Weinbaum, M., eds. (1970). The London Eyre of 1244. London.
- Coke, Edward; Littleton, Thomas; Hargrave, Francis (1817), The ... Part of the Institutes of the Laws of England; Or, a Commentary Upon Littleton: Not the Name of the Author Only, But of the Law Itself : Including Also the Notes of Lord Chief Justice Hale and Lord Chancellor Nottingham, and an Analysis of Littleton, Written by an Unknown Hand ..., vol. 3 (19 ed.), Clarke, p. ii
- Dasent, W. I. (1911). The Speakers of the House of Commons from the earliest times to the present day.
- Luard, H.R., ed. (1864–1869). Annales Monastici. Vol. 5 vols. London.
- Powicke, Frederick Maurice (1966) [1947]. King Henry III and the Lord Edward: the Community of the Realm in the Thirteenth Century (2nd ed.).
- Roskell, John Smith (1983). Parliament and Politics in Late Medieval England. Vol. 3. London: Bloomsbury. ISBN 9780907628309.
- Thrush, Andrew; Ferris, John P., eds. (2010), The History of Parliament: the House of Commons 1604–1629, Cambridge University Press (available online from Website of The History of Parliament Trust:1604–1629, The History of Parliament Trust)
