= Oxford Parliament =

Oxford Parliament may refer to:

- The Oxford Parliament (1258), also known as the Mad Parliament and the "First English Parliament", assembled during the reign of Henry III of England
- The Oxford Parliament (1644), 1644–1645, during the reign of Charles I of England
- The Oxford Parliament (1681) assembled in 1681 during the reign of Charles II of England

== See also ==
- Oxfordshire County Council, the local authority
- List of parliaments of England
