= Oxford Parliament (1258) =

English parliament

The Oxford Parliament, also known as the Mad Parliament, assembled in 1258 during the reign of Henry III of England. It is best known for the Provisions of Oxford, a set of constitutional reforms that forced the English king to govern according to the advice of a council of barons.

== Name ==
The parliament came to be known as "Mad" as a result of an entry in the Latin chronicle Liber de Antiquis Legibus which read "Hoc anno fuit illud insane parliamentum apud Oxoniam". However, historians A.G. Little and R.L. Poole have shown that the word insane was overwritten in the original text, and may have originally read insigne instead. Therefore, it would have originally read "illud insigne parliamentum" ("that distinguished parliament").

== Background ==
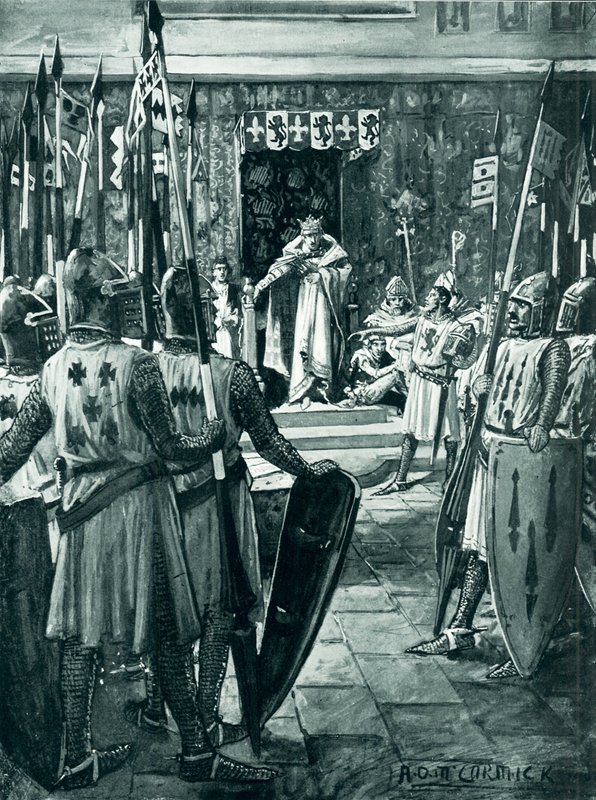
Henry III is confronted by his barons in Oxford (Arthur David McCormick, c. 1922)

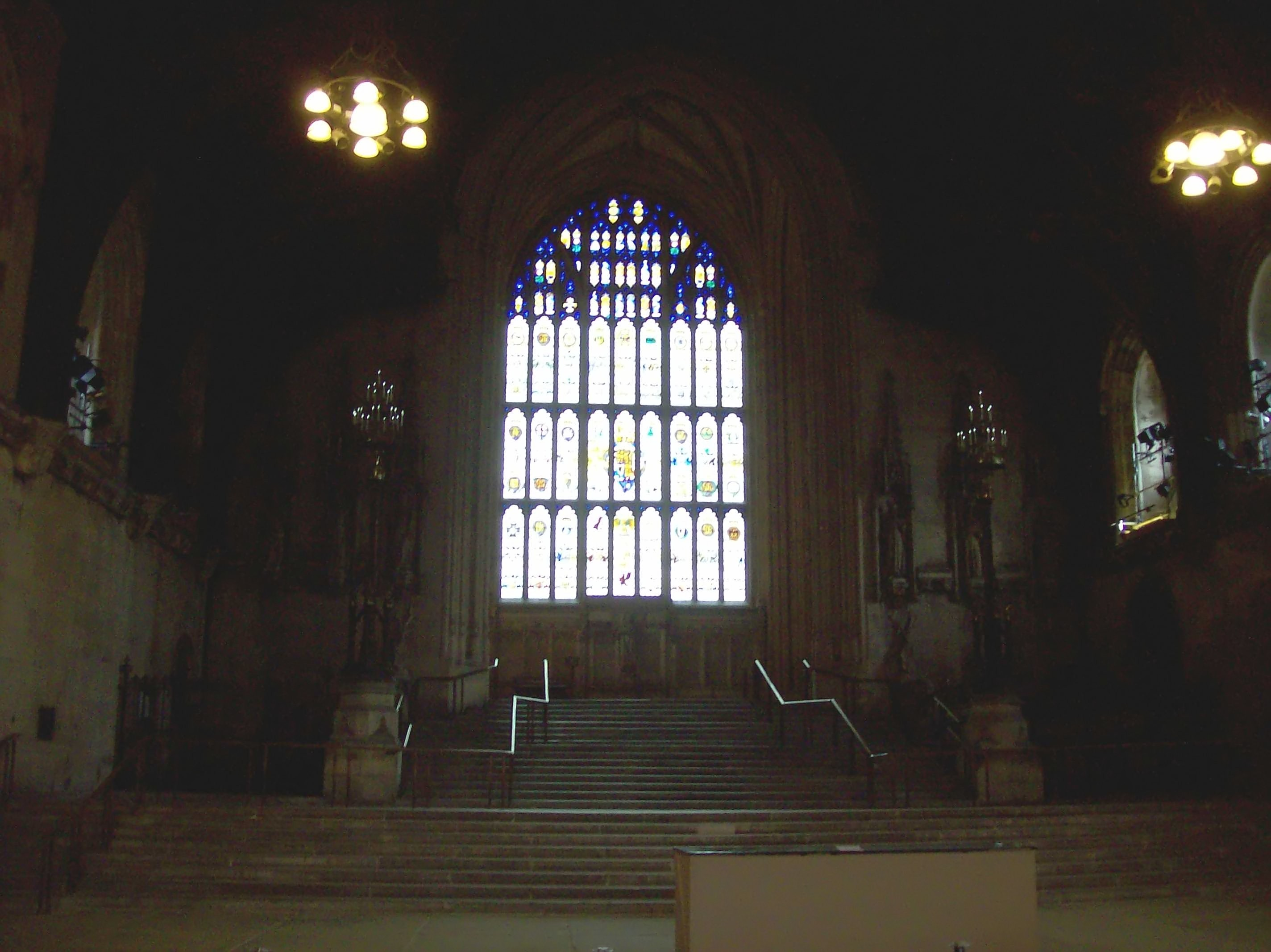
Westminster Hall, where the barons confronted Henry III

By the 1250s, there was widespread resentment among the barons against Henry III. The causes included the favoritism he showed to his Lusignan half-brothers, William and Aymer de Valence. There was also opposition to Henry's unrealistic plans to conquer the Kingdom of Sicily for his second son, Edmund Crouchback. In 1255, the King informed parliament that as a result of the Sicilian business he owed the pope the huge sum of £100,000 (Note: The Bank of England's inflation calculator estimates that £100,000 in 1255 would be worth £125,142,401.27 in 2021.) and that if he defaulted England would be placed under an interdict. The King had other debts as well. Through 1256 and 1257, however, the barons refused to grant Henry the taxes he needed to solve his financial problems. The King's position was weakened further when English armies suffered several defeats at the hand of Llywelyn ap Gruffudd in Wales.

Desperate for funds, the King summoned a parliament to meet at Westminster on 9 April. On 12 April, a group of lay magnates came together to offer united resistance to the King's demands for funds. These were Richard de Clare, Roger Bigod, Simon de Montfort, Peter of Savoy, Hugh Bigod, John FitzGeoffrey, and Peter de Montfort. The barons were given three days to consider their response to the King's request, and on the appointed day a group of earls, barons, and knights confronted the King and his eldest son, the Lord Edward, fully armed inside Westminster Hall. They demanded the King agree to reforms, and Henry swore on the Gospels to agree to whatever they advised.

An agreement was recorded in two letters patent dated 2 May. In the first, the King agreed that by Christmas he would introduce reforms on the advice of his barons and in return the barons would consent to new taxes for the king. If the King failed to keep his word, he would be excommunicated. In the second document, the King agreed that a reform programme should be prepared by a council of twenty-four—half from the king's council and half elected by the barons—that was to meet at Oxford on 11 June. The twenty-four would then present their suggestions at a parliament summoned to meet in that city.

== Actions ==
At the Oxford Parliament on 11 June, Henry accepted a new form of government, laid out in the Provisions of Oxford, in which power was placed in the hands of a council of fifteen members who were to supervise ministerial appointments, local administration and the custody of royal castles. Parliament, meanwhile, which was to meet three times a year, would monitor the performance of this council.

Henry agreed to these terms, and the council of fifteen was formed. The members included Simon de Montfort, Peter de Montfort, Boniface of Savoy in his role as the Archbishop of Canterbury, Walter de Cantilupe as the Bishop of Worcester, the Earl of Norfolk, the Earl of Gloucester, the Earl of Hereford, the Earl of Warwick, the Earl of Albemarle, Hugh Bigod, Peter II of Savoy, Roger de Mortimer, James de Audeleye and John Maunsel.

== Aftermath ==
The resolution of the Parliament did not last for long. The pope excused the King of his obligations related to the throne of Sicily, meaning that he no longer required the funds provided by the additional taxation given to him by Parliament. The issue was one which was brought before King Louis IX of France, acting as arbitrator between Henry and the barons at the Mise of Amiens. Louis made a decision entirely in favour of his fellow king, overturning the agreement made at the Oxford Parliament and absolved Henry's need to allow Parliament to appoint ministers, instead restoring that power to him.

This soon resulted in the Second Barons' War, with forces led by Simon de Montfort rebelling against the King. Following an initial attack by the rebel barons, Henry's feudal army was summoned and won a battle at Northampton. The forces of Montfort and Henry failed to come to terms, resulting in the Battle of Lewes where the rebel barons were victorious and the Mise of Lewes resulted. Lord Edward escaped his captors within a few months, and began to re-conquer England. The forces of Montfort found themselves trapped at Evesham, and in the ensuing battle, he was killed and his forces were routed by Edward's. The rebel barons continued to resist, but the Dictum of Kenilworth in October 1266 granted pardons, resulting in their surrender.

== Legacy ==
Peter de Montfort's role as parlour or prolocutor was the forerunner for Speaker of the House of Commons which officially began in 1377.

== See also ==
- Henry de Bracton
- List of parliaments of England
- Oxford Parliament (1644)
- Oxford Parliament (1681)
