= 7th Parliament of Elizabeth I =

1589 assembly of the English parliament

The 7th Parliament of Queen Elizabeth I was summoned by Queen Elizabeth I of England on 18 September 1588 and assembled on 4 February 1589.

Originally summoned in response to the defeat of the Spanish Armada in August 1588, the opening was delayed by Elizabeth as long as possible to avoid the inevitable debates on religious reform and foreign policy which she considered her own private prerogative. At the opening of Parliament on 4 February Sir Christopher Hatton, the Lord Chancellor, ordered the assembled Houses of Lords and Commons on behalf of the Queen to steer clear of debate on religious affairs. A Serjeant-at-Law, Sir Thomas Snagge, MP for Bedford, was appointed Speaker of the House of Commons.

Bills aimed at curbing abuses in the Exchequer and by purveyors were quashed by royal intervention. In spite of opposition to the unprecedented request for a double subsidy to deal with the threat from Spain, the subsidy was approved and there was even a joint petition from both houses to formally declare war on that country.

By the dissolution on 29 March 1589 a total of sixteen public and eight private bills had been passed into law.

== Notable acts of the Parliament ==
- Common Informers Act 1588
- Simony Act 1588
- Erection of Cottages Act 1588
- Forcible Entry Act 1588
- Sale of Horses Act 1588

== See also ==
- List of acts of the 7th Parliament of Queen Elizabeth I
- List of parliaments of England
