= Mise of Amiens =

1264 English political settlement

Settlement between King Henry III of England and oppositional magnates
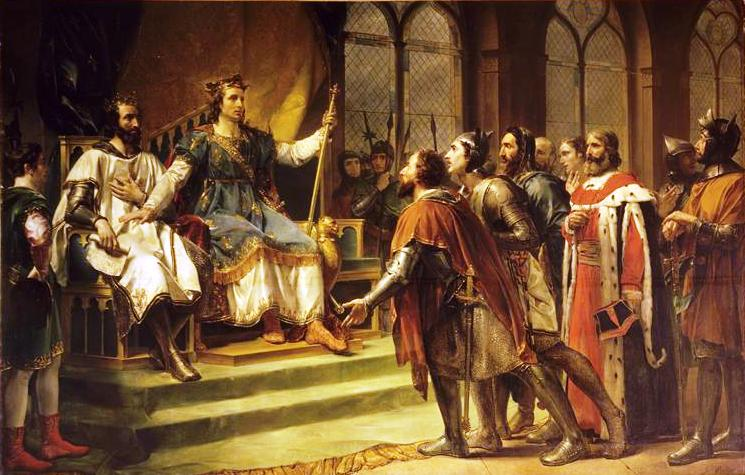
- Saint Louis Mediating Between the King of England and His Barons by Georges Rouget, 1820
- Type: Settlement
- Signed: 23 January 1264
- Location: Amiens, Picardy, France
- Effective: Immediately
- Language: Latin

The Mise (Note: A "mise" in this context is a settlement by agreement. The use of the word in this sense is very rare in English, and is normally reserved for the Mise of Amiens and the Mise of Lewes from later the same year. It is the feminine past participle of the French verb mettre (to put), and is pronounced /ˈmiːz/.) of Amiens ([miz ɒv a.mjɛ̃]) was a settlement given by King Louis IX of France on 23 January 1264 in the conflict between King Henry III of England and his rebellious barons, led by Simon de Montfort. Louis's one-sided decision for King Henry led directly to the hostilities of the Second Barons' War.

The conflict between king and magnates was caused by dissatisfaction with the influence of foreigners at court, and Henry's high level of taxation. In 1258 Henry was forced to accept the Provisions of Oxford that essentially left royal government in the hands of a council of magnates, but this document went through a long series of revocations and reinstatements. In 1263, as the country was on the brink of civil war, the two parties agreed to submit the matter to arbitration by the French king. Louis was a firm believer in the royal prerogative and decided clearly in favour of Henry. (Note: The text of both Henry's and the barons' arguments (pp. 252–7 and 256–79 respectively), as well as Louis' reply (pp. 280–91), have been edited and printed in its original Latin by Treharne and Sanders, with a parallel translation into English.)

The outcome was unacceptable for the rebellious barons, and war between the two parties broke out almost immediately after the announcement of the settlement. After a victory at the Battle of Lewes in May 1264, Montfort took over control of government, but the success was short-lived. Henry's oldest son Edward – the later King Edward I – started a military campaign that ended in the Battle of Evesham in August 1265, where Montfort was defeated and killed. Parts of the baronial resistance still held out, but by the end of 1266 the final garrison at Kenilworth Castle surrendered. The rebels were given pardons according to terms set out in the Dictum of Kenilworth.

== Background ==
By 1264, the reign of Henry III was deeply troubled by disputes between the king and his nobility. The conflict was caused by several factors. One source of discontent was the influence two groups of royal favourites enjoyed at court: the Savoyards, relatives of Queen Eleanor of Provence, and the king's half-brothers, known as Poitevins or Lusignans. The native nobility were offended by the great political influence held by these foreigners. Secondly, the king had in 1254 accepted Pope Innocent IV's offer of the crown of Sicily for his younger son Edmund. The offer involved repelling the current Hohenstaufen rulers of the island, and proved to be very expensive. Lastly, there was a personal dispute between King Henry and one of his subjects, Simon de Montfort, Earl of Leicester. Montfort, a foreigner himself, was initially on good terms with Henry, and had in 1238 married the king's sister Eleanor. The two fell out, however, and Montfort became the leader of the opposition, together with Richard de Clare, Earl of Gloucester. In 1258, Henry was forced to accept the so-called Provisions of Oxford, whereby he effectively surrendered control of royal government to a council of magnates. In 1259 the baronial program of reform was further elaborated upon in the Provisions of Westminster.

The provisions remained in effect for three years; at one point Henry's oldest son Edward – the later King Edward I – even joined forces with Montfort. It was not until 1261 that Henry was able to move against the opposition. Receiving a papal annulment of the provisions, he reassumed control of government. Over the next two years, however, Henry's governing deteriorated the situation once more. He failed to reconcile with Montfort, and alienated Gloucester's son and heir Gilbert. In April 1263 Montfort returned to England after a long stay in France, and reignited the reform movement. On 16 July Henry was surrounded by rebel forces in the Tower of London, and once more forced to accept the conditions of the provisions. The Lord Edward, now firmly on the side of his father against Montfort, now took control of the situation. In October Edward took Windsor Castle, and the baronial alliance started to break up. Cornered, Montfort had to accept a truce and agree to submit the issue to arbitration by the French king Louis IX.

== Arguments and settlement ==
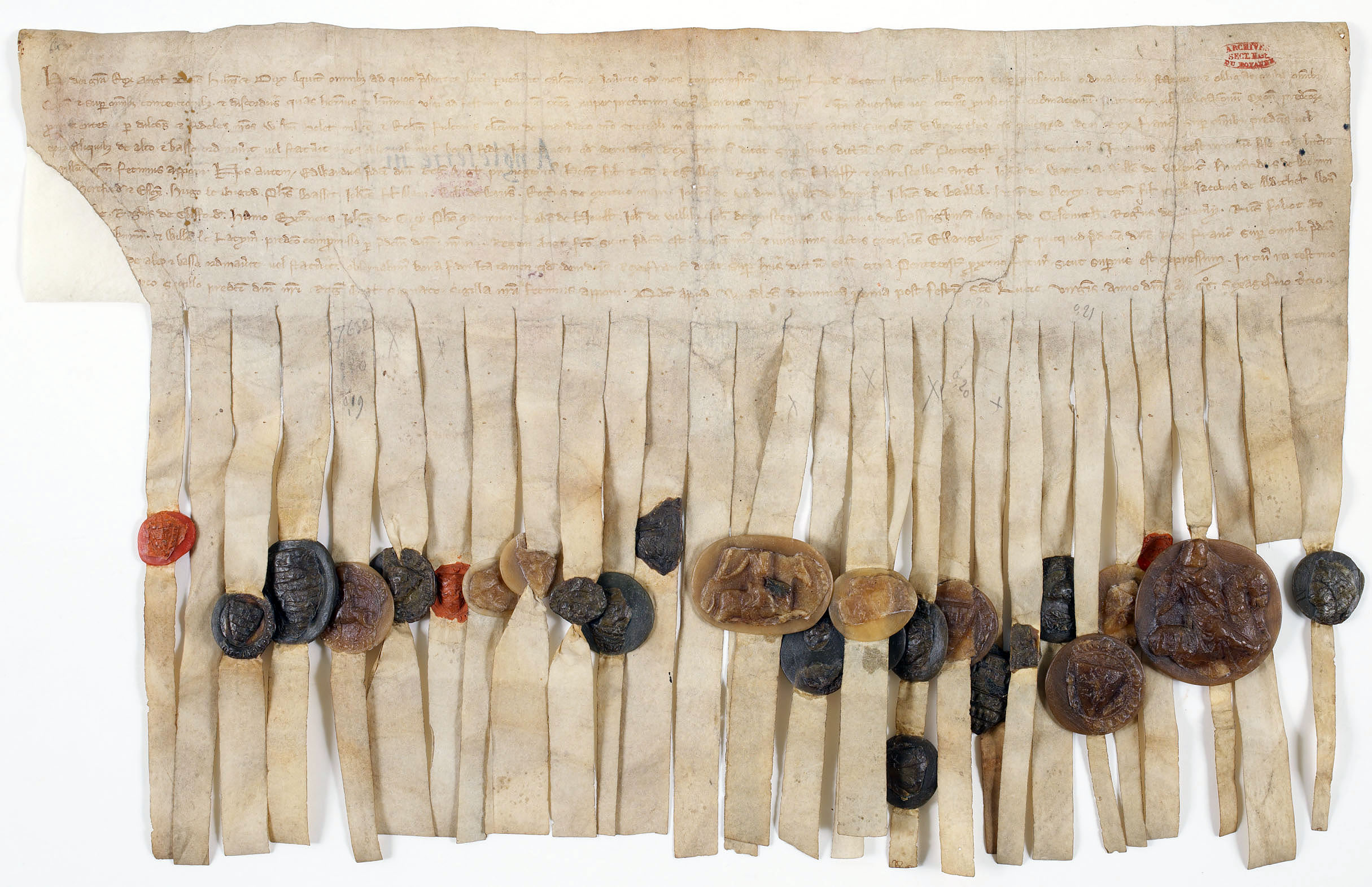
Letter by which Henry III, King of England, took the King of France, Louis IX, to arbitrate his dispute with his barons, written at Windsor on 16 October 1263 (Document kept in Archives nationales (France), France

On 28 December 1263 Henry left for France to present his case to King Louis. Montfort was prevented from attending by an accident, and he was represented by Peter de Montfort and others. Henry had already tried once before, in September, to appeal to the French king. That time Louis had been sympathetic to Henry's cause, but decided in favour of maintaining the provisions. At Amiens Henry argued that his right to appoint his own ministers and officials had been denied him, in violation of the royal prerogative. He also accused his opponents of destroying royal castles and laying waste to royal lands. For his injuries he demanded a compensation of the barons of £300,000 and 200,000 marks. Referring to the papal writ of annulment, Henry asked the French king to free him from observing the provisions forced upon him by the barons. (Note: It has been suggested that the document presenting Henry's position in fact dated from the earlier meeting in September, not from the January arbitration.)

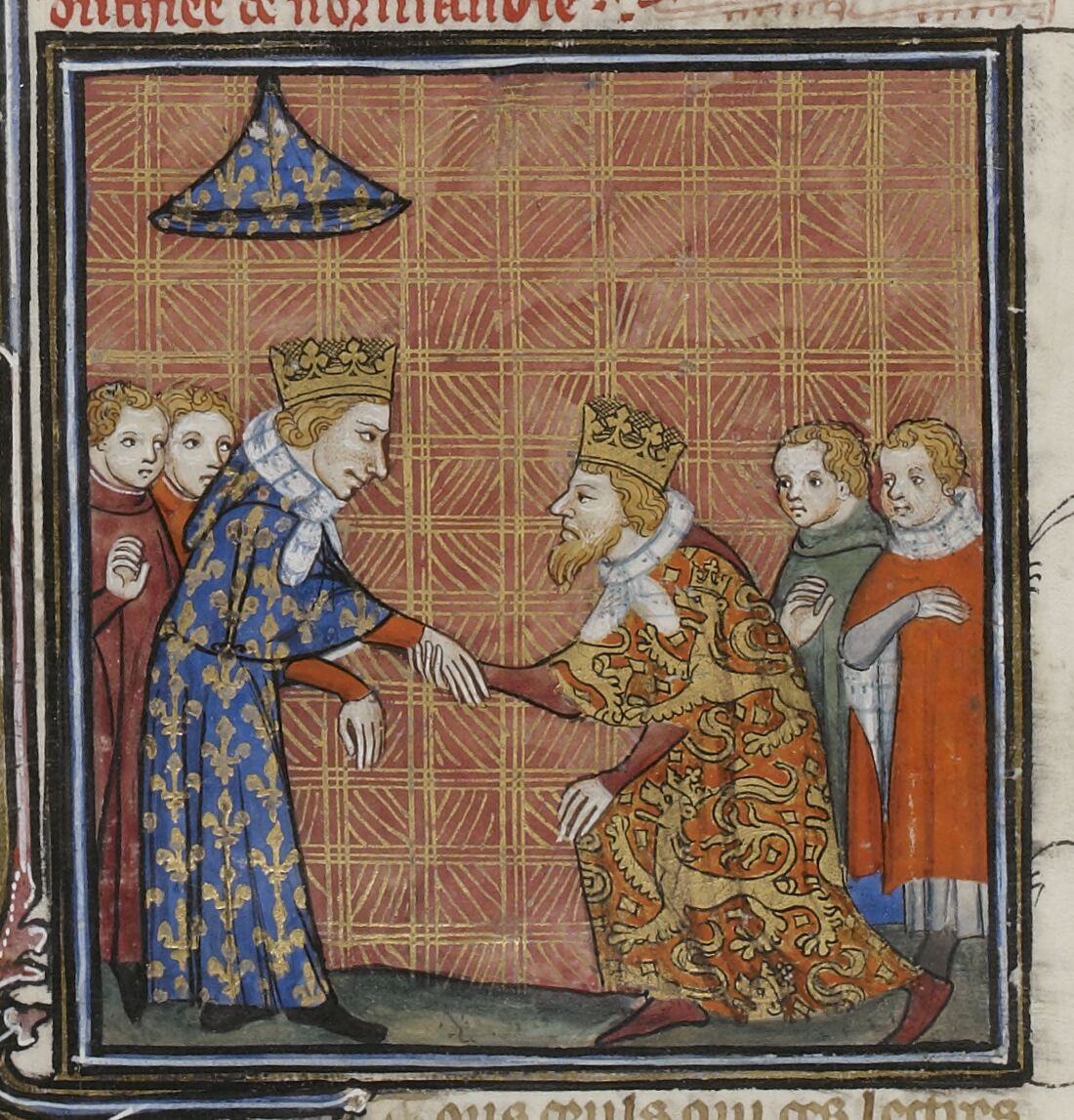
Henry III paying homage to Louis IX of France. As Duke of Aquitaine, Henry was a vassal of the French king.

Two documents survive of the barons' complaints. In the first of these, the barons reiterated the background of the conflict, and stressed the fact that the king himself had accepted the conditions of the provisions. Henry had in fact, in an effort to gain public support, pledged to uphold the provisions, a fact that was now made the most of. The document further goes on to explain the reform instituted by the baronial council. In order to restore law and peacekeeping to the country, the council had installed a new Chief Justiciar and Chancellor. They had also appointed new sheriffs in the counties, who were to be directly accountable to the government and be replaced annually. The king had violated these conditions, it was argued, when he had appointed his own chancellor and a number of sheriffs. He had also taken over custody of Winchester Castle, which had been given over to Montfort by the provisions. Furthermore, there were accusations made against individual royal adherents, such as Roger Mortimer for his military raids in the Welsh Marches. The second document goes into more detail on the king's alleged transgressions. By extortionate taxation, it was claimed, Henry had impoverished the land. He had also infringed the liberties of the Church, violated Magna Carta, and corrupted justice.

When Louis IX made his decision on 23 January 1264, it was entirely in favour of Henry III. The settlement starts out by reiterating the declarations of the two parties, where they place the decision fully in the hands of the French king. Louis invoked the difficulties England had suffered over the previous years, and stressed the importance of a resolution. Since the pope had already invalidated the provisions, Louis decided to "...quash and invalidate all these provisions, ordinances, and obligations, or whatever else they may be called...", and absolved the king from any adherence to them. Castles that were handed over to the barons as part of the agreement were to be given back to the king, and Henry should be free to appoint his own ministers. The only concession made to the barons was a general pardon extended to those involved in the conflict. The financial demands of King Henry were not mentioned. Louis was a firm believer in the royal prerogative, and was never likely to embrace the precedents set by the barons' infringement of Henry's authority. There was also the papal annulment to take into account, which the deeply pious Louis was not going to ignore. At the same time, Henry's wife Eleanor of Provence – who was Louis' sister-in-law – had worked hard to procure a favourable decision for her husband. It was clear from the start though, that the French king had gone too far in his partisan decision, and that the settlement was little more than a dead letter.

== Aftermath ==
The settlement did not present a solution to the conflict, but rather a recipe for further problems. The one-sided decision for the king and against the barons left Montfort with little choice but armed rebellion. Hostilities started already in February, when Montfort's sons, Henry and Simon the Younger, attacked the possessions of Roger Mortimer in the Marches. Henry summoned the feudal army, and the royal forces won an important victory at Northampton, where the younger Simon was captured. Montfort was still in control of London, as Henry regained control over Kent and Sussex. Montfort marched out of London to negotiate, but the terms – involving maintaining the provisions – were rejected by the king. The only option remaining was to fight, and the two forces met at Lewes on 14 May 1264. In spite of inferior numbers, the baronial forces led by Simon de Montfort won the battle. Edward, commanding the right wing, quickly defeated the London forces. When he set out in pursuit of the fleeing soldiers, however, he left the rest of the royal army open to attack by the baronial forces, who soon won the day. By the settlement called the Mise of Lewes, the provisions were reinstated and Edward was given over as hostage.

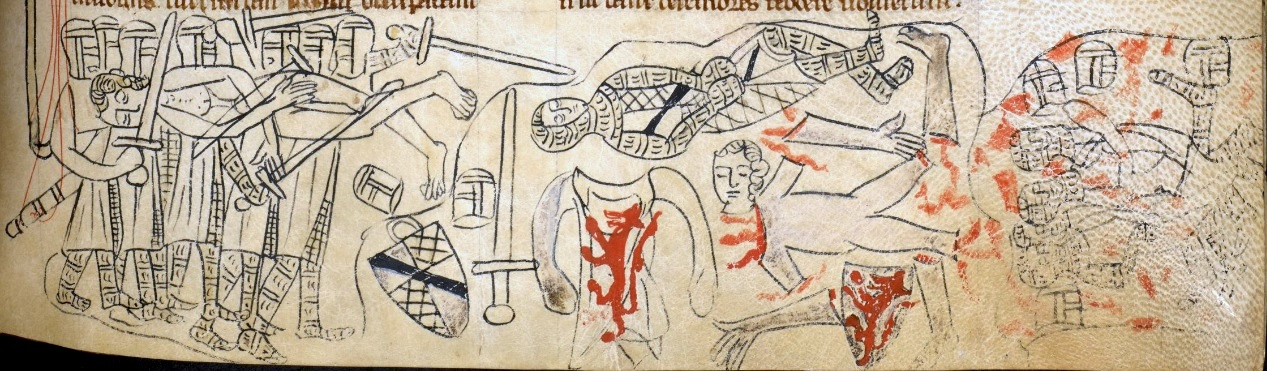
Medieval manuscript showing Simon de Montfort's mutilated body at the Battle of Evesham

The government led by Montfort soon ran into problems. He negotiated a treaty with Llywelyn ap Gruffudd, the Prince of Wales, an act that made him unpopular with the English Marcher lords. In May Edward escaped captivity, with the help of Gilbert de Clare, Earl of Gloucester, who had now come over to the royal side. Edward started on a campaign of re-conquest, while Montfort was forced to suppress a rebellion in the Marches. He succeeded only by making large concessions to Llewelyn, and then moved east to join forces with his son Simon. Edward, however, routed the younger Simon at Kenilworth Castle, and on 4 August 1265 Montfort found himself trapped at Evesham, forced to give battle with a much smaller army than the royals. The battle soon turned into a massacre; Montfort himself was killed and mutilated on the field. Even with Montfort dead resistance remained, particularly at the virtually impregnable Kenilworth Castle. In October 1266 the Dictum of Kenilworth set down terms by which the rebels could obtain pardons, and by the end of the year the garrison surrendered.
