= Mise of Lewes =

1264 English settlement of the Second Barons' War

Settlement between King Henry III of England and oppositional magnates
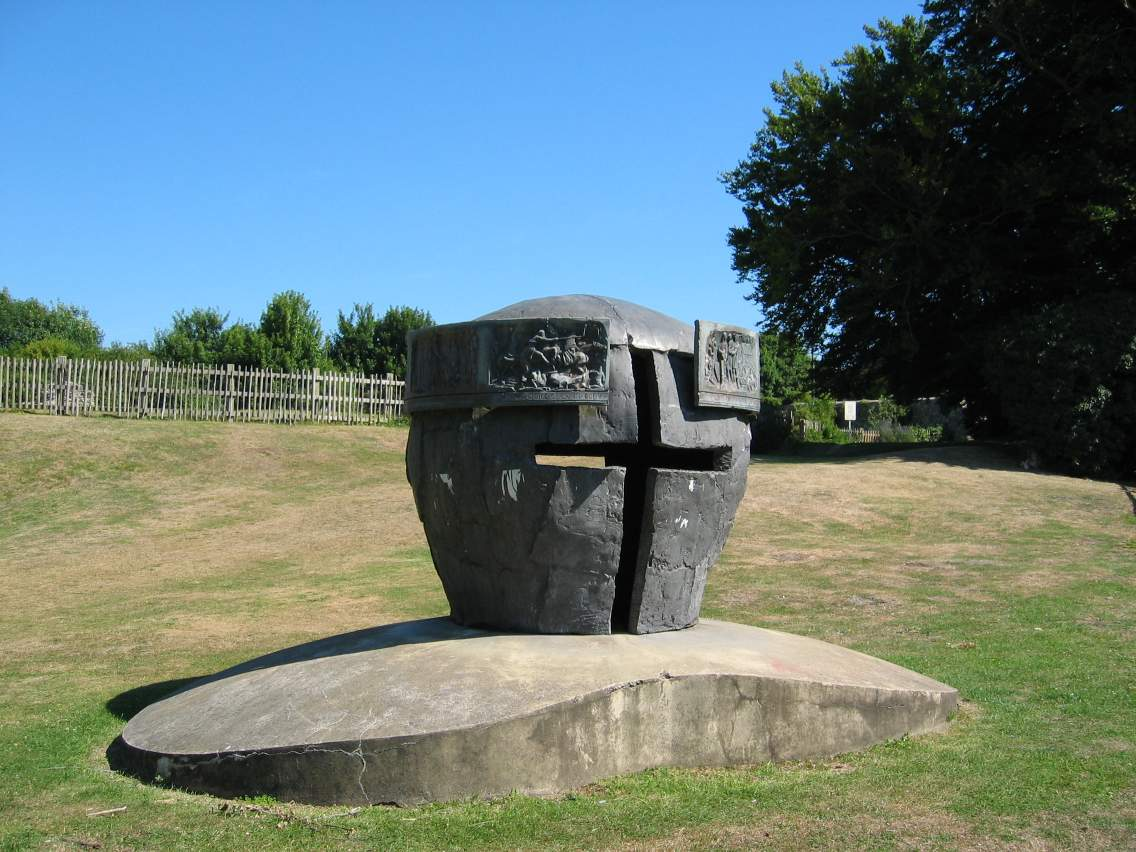
- 1964 monument to the Battle of Lewes
- Type: Settlement
- Signed: 14 May 1264
- Location: Lewes, Sussex
- Effective: Immediately

The Mise (Note: A "mise" in this context is a settlement by agreement. The use of the word in this sense is very rare in English, and is normally reserved for the Mise of Lewes and the Mise of Amiens from earlier the same year. It is the feminine past participle of the French verb mettre (to put), and is pronounced /ˈmiːz/.) of Lewes was a settlement made on 14 May 1264 between King Henry III of England and his rebellious barons, led by Simon de Montfort. The settlement was made on the day of the Battle of Lewes, one of the two major battles of the Second Barons' War. The conflict between king and magnates was caused by dissatisfaction with the influence of foreigners at court and Henry's high level and new methods of taxation. In 1258, Henry had been forced to accept the Provisions of Oxford, which essentially left the royal government in the hands of a council of magnates, but this document went through a long series of revocations and reinstatements. In 1263, as the country was on the brink of civil war, the two parties had agreed to submit the matter to arbitration by the French king Louis IX. Louis was a firm believer in the royal prerogative, and decided clearly in favour of Henry. The outcome was unacceptable for the rebellious barons, and war between the two parties broke out almost immediately.

The Mise of Lewes was signed on the day of de Montfort's victory at the Battle of Lewes, though it is not known whether it happened during or after the battle. Neither are the terms of the document known, though it seems clear that they involved conditions for further negotiations. These efforts at a permanent settlement fell through, however, and the support for de Montfort's government gradually eroded. Henry's oldest son, Edward – the later King Edward I – started a military campaign that ended in the Battle of Evesham in August 1265, where de Montfort was defeated and killed. Parts of the baronial resistance still held out, but by the end of 1266 the final besieged garrison at Kenilworth Castle surrendered. The rebels were given pardons according to terms set out in the Dictum of Kenilworth.

== Background ==
By 1264, the reign of Henry III was deeply troubled by disputes between the king and his nobility. The conflict was caused by several factors: the influence of foreigners at court, a wasteful war over the crown of Sicily, and a personal dispute between King Henry and Simon de Montfort, Earl of Leicester. In 1258, Henry was forced to accept the so-called Provisions of Oxford, whereby he effectively surrendered control of royal government to a council of magnates. In 1259, the baronial program of reform was further elaborated upon in the Provisions of Westminster. The provisions remained in effect for three years; it was not until 1261 that Henry was able to move against the opposition. Receiving the papal annulment of the provisions his emissaries had campaigned for, he re-assumed control of government. Over the next two years, however, discontent re-emerged over Henry's style of government. He failed to be reconciled with de Montfort, and he also alienated Gloucester's son and heir Gilbert. In April 1263, de Montfort returned to England after a long stay in France, and reignited the reform movement. On 16 July, Henry was surrounded by rebel forces in the Tower of London, and once more forced to accept the conditions of the provisions. Prince Edward – the later King Edward I – now took control of the situation. In October, Edward took Windsor Castle and the baronial alliance started to break up.

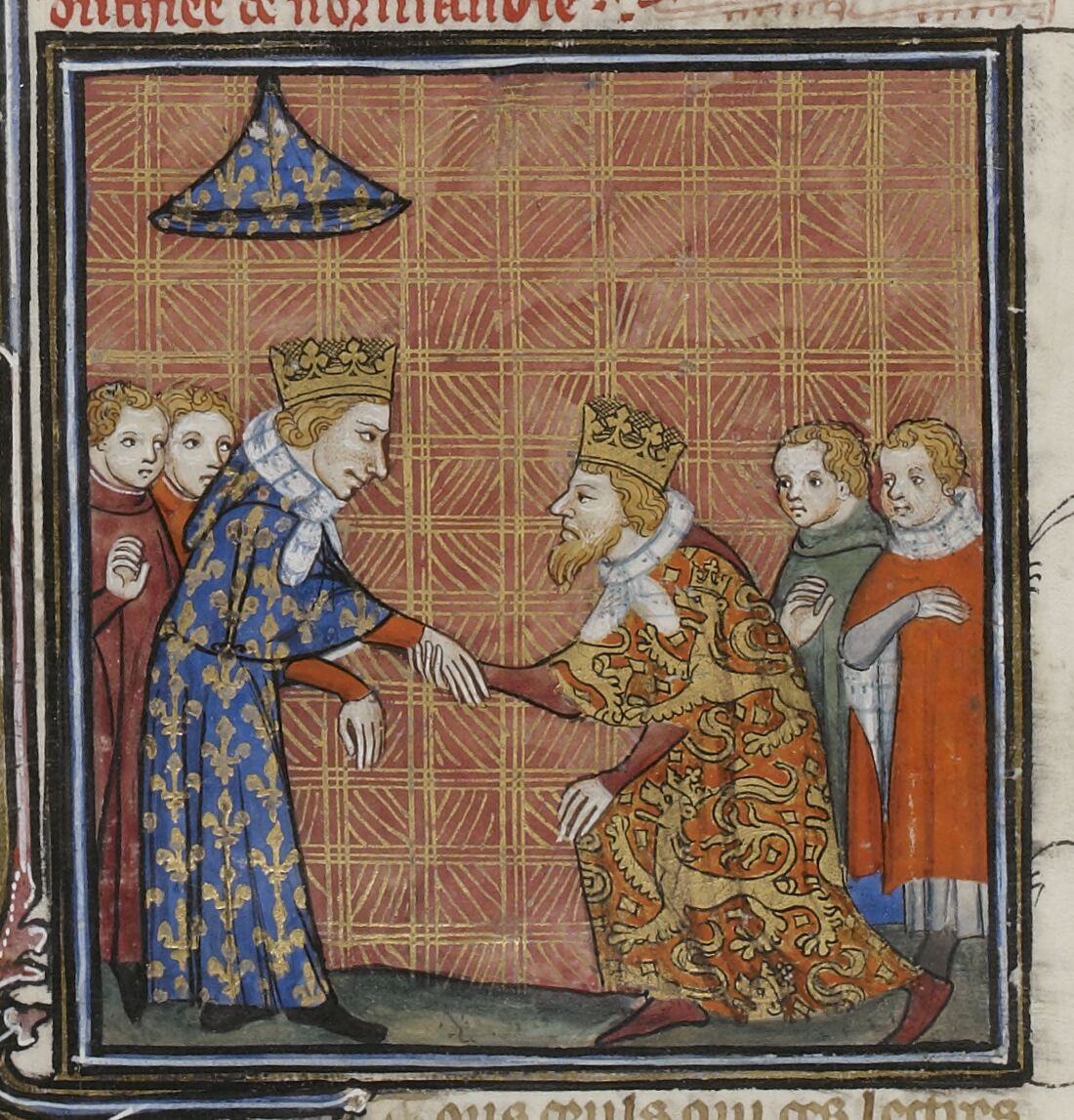
Henry III doing homage to Louis IX of France. As Duke of Aquitaine, Henry was a vassal of the French king.

Cornered, de Montfort had to accept a truce and agree to submit the issue to arbitration by the French king Louis IX. By the Mise of Amiens, Louis decided entirely in favour of Henry, and repudiated the provisions. The settlement did not present a solution to the conflict, but rather a recipe for further problems. The one-sided decision for the king and against the barons left de Montfort with little choice but armed rebellion. Hostilities started already in February, when de Montfort's sons, Henry and Simon the Younger, attacked the possessions of Roger Mortimer in the Marches. Henry summoned the feudal army, and the royal forces won an important victory at Northampton, where the younger Simon was captured. De Montfort was still in control of London, as Henry regained control over Kent and Sussex. De Montfort marched out of London to negotiate, but the terms – involving maintaining the provisions – were rejected by the king. The only option remaining was to fight, and the two forces met at Lewes on 14 May 1264. In spite of inferior numbers, the baronial forces led by Simon de Montfort won the battle. Edward, commanding the right wing, quickly defeated the London forces. When he set out in pursuit of the fleeing soldiers, however, he left the rest of the royal army exposed. The baronial forces took advantage of the situation, and soon won the day.

== Settlement ==
Since no documents exist to confirm the content of the Mise of Lewes, there has been much debate among historians over its content, and the circumstances under which it was written. Noël Denholm-Young, in an article published in 1933, made a conjecture on what the main points of the agreement were. The first point, according to Denholm-Young, was that Prince Edward and his cousin, Henry of Almain, should be given over to the barons as hostages. Secondly, those of the baronial party who had been taken hostage at Northampton were to be released. Thirdly, those who had taken hostages from the royalist party at the Battle of Lewes were to receive ransom. Finally, it was agreed that a committee of French clergy and nobles should arbitrate over a permanent settlement. This interpretation has been largely followed by later historians.

One contentious point in Denholm-Young's article was his assertion that there was no mention of the Provisions of Oxford in the Mise of Lewes. This was an idea that John Maddicott strongly contested in a 1983 article. According to Maddicott, the provisions had been at the centre of Montfort's opposition over the last six years, and it was unlikely that he would give them up so easily. Nevertheless, de Montfort showed willingness to negotiate the terms of the provisions. As such, the Mise of Lewes was a moderate document; Montfort wanted to avoid a repetition of the situation after the Mise of Amiens. Rather it was external circumstances outside of de Montfort's control that led to the eventual failure of the negotiations between the royalists and the barons.

This interpretation was challenged by David Carpenter two years later, in 1985. De Montfort had no intention to compromise with the royalists at all, according to Carpenter. In Carpenter's version of events, the Mise of Lewes was written while the battle was still ongoing, not after the battle was over, as previously assumed. This put de Montfort in a situation where concessions were necessary, in order to bring hostilities to a halt as soon as possible. Once the battle was over and government in de Montfort's hands, he had no longer any interest in reaching a compromise with the royalists, and that was why hostilities continued. This dating of the document, however, has later been disputed by D. W. Burton, who maintains that the document was in fact signed after the battle was concluded.

== Aftermath ==
The government led by de Montfort soon ran into problems; he faced poor finances, general disorder, and the threat of invasion from exiled royalists in France. It was decided – since the French arbitration committee had come to nothing – to set up a provisional administration, consisting of de Montfort, the young Earl of Gloucester, and the Bishop of Chichester. These three were to elect a council of nine, to govern until a permanent settlement could be reached. By the Peace of Canterbury in August, Henry and Edward were forced to accept even stricter terms than those of the Mise of Lewes. According to this new agreement, the current form of government was to remain in force throughout the reign of King Henry, and into that of Edward. To keep the borders safe, Montfort had been forced to release Roger Mortimer and other royalist Marcher lords after the Battle of Lewes. In December, de Montfort forced Mortimer, Roger de Clifford and Roger de Leybourne to promise to leave the country for Ireland. Then, in January, he summoned a parliament at Leicester which became known as Montfort's Parliament, including representatives from the shires and boroughs; an innovation in English government. Here Montfort secured the support of the community of the realm for his continued rule.

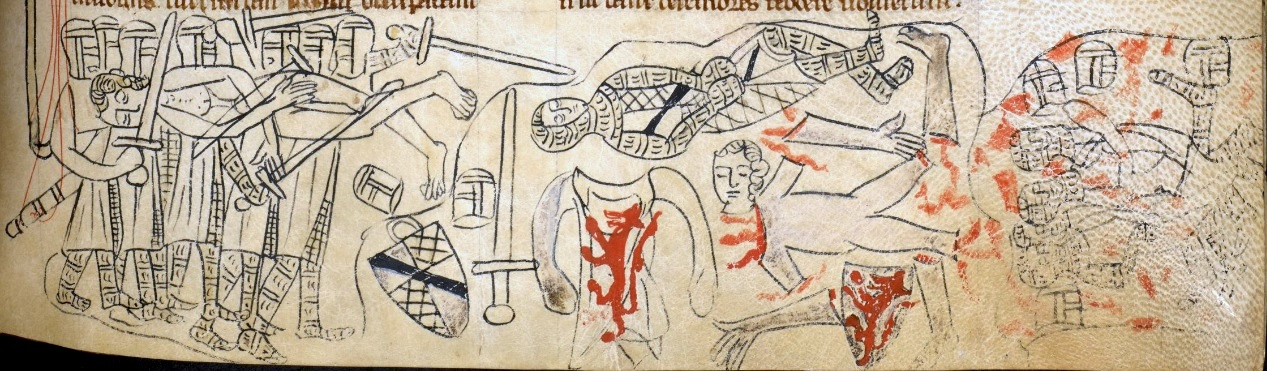
Medieval manuscript showing Simon de Montfort's mutilated body at the field of Evesham

De Montfort's success was illusory, however. The terms of the Peace of Canterbury were rejected by a papal legate in negotiations at Boulogne. Meanwhile, the Marcher lords did not leave the country, and remained a thorn in the side of the regime. The triumvirate at the head of government broke up when the Earl of Gloucester defected to the royalist side. In May, Edward was able to escape captivity, with Gloucester's help. Edward started on a campaign of re-conquest, while de Montfort was forced to suppress a rebellion in the Marches. He succeeded only by making large concessions to Llewelyn, and then moved east to join forces with his son Simon. Edward, however, routed the younger Simon at Kenilworth Castle. On 4 August 1265 de Montfort found himself trapped at Evesham, forced to give battle with a much smaller army than the royals. The battle soon turned into a massacre; de Montfort himself was killed and mutilated on the field. Even with Montfort dead resistance remained, particularly at the virtually impregnable Kenilworth Castle. In October 1266 the Dictum of Kenilworth set down terms by which the rebels could obtain pardons, and by the end of the year the garrison surrendered.

== Sources ==
- Burton, D. W. (1993), "1264: some new documents", Historical Research, 66 (161): 317–28, doi:10.1111/j.1468-2281.1993.tb01816.x.
- Carpenter, David (1985), "Simon de Montfort and the Mise of Lewes", Historical Research, 58 (137): 1–11, doi:10.1111/j.1468-2281.1985.tb01974.x.
- Denholm-Young, Noël (1933), "Collected Papers on Mediaeval Subjects", English Historical Review, 48 (192), Oxford University Press: 558–75, doi:10.1093/ehr/xlviii.cxcii.558, JSTOR 552795.
- Maddicott, John (1983), "The Mise of Lewes, 1264", English Historical Review, 98 (388), Oxford University Press: 588–603, doi:10.1093/ehr/xcviii.ccclxxxviii.588, JSTOR 569785.
- Maddicott, John (1994), Simon de Montfort, Cambridge: Cambridge University Press, ISBN 0-521-37493-6
- Maddicott, John (2004). "Montfort, Simon de, eighth earl of Leicester (c.1208–1265)". Oxford Dictionary of National Biography (online ed.). Oxford: Oxford University Press. doi:10.1093/ref:odnb/19049. (Subscription, Wikipedia Library access or UK public library membership required.)
- "mise". Oxford English Dictionary (online ed.). Oxford University Press. doi:10.1093/OED/1025026204. (Subscription or participating institution membership required.)
- Powicke, F. M. (1947), King Henry III and the Lord Edward: The Community of the Realm in the Thirteenth Century, Oxford: Clarendon Press
- Powicke, F. M. (1962) [1953], The Thirteenth Century: 1216–1307 (2nd ed.), Oxford: Clarendon Press
- Prestwich, Michael (1997), Edward I (updated ed.), New Haven: Yale University Press, ISBN 0-300-07209-0
- Prestwich, Michael (2007), Plantagenet England: 1225–1360 (new ed.), Oxford: Oxford University Press, ISBN 978-0-19-822844-8
- Ridgeway, H. W. (2004). "Henry III (1207–1272)". Oxford Dictionary of National Biography (online ed.). Oxford: Oxford University Press. doi:10.1093/ref:odnb/12950. (Subscription, Wikipedia Library access or UK public library membership required.)
- Sadler, John (2008), The Second Barons' War: Simon de Motfort and the Battles of Lewes and Evesham, Barnsley: Pen & Sword Military, ISBN 978-1-84415-831-7
- Treharne, R. F.; Sanders, I. J. (1973), Documents of the Baronial Movement of Reform and Rebellion, 1258–1267, Oxford: Clarendon Press, ISBN 0-19-822222-X
