= Unlearned Parliament =

English parliament of 1404

The Unlearned Parliament also known as the Lawless Parliament , Parliament of Dunces or the Parliamentum Indoctorum is the term used for the 1404 parliament called by Henry IV of England at the Great Hall of St. Mary's Priory, the Benedictine monastery in Coventry, Warwickshire, so called because the king refused to allow lawyers to stand as members, with "No Sheriff to be returned, nor any apprentice or other person at law" due to the king claiming that they were "troublesome", although more likely simply because they were familiar with the law.

"Much ado there was; but to conclude, the worthy Archbishop (viz. Tho. Arundell) standing stoutly for the good of the Church, preserved it at that time from the storm impending."

During the parliament, the House of Commons attempted to interfere with the running of the king's household, suggesting ways to spend less and to stop the bestowal of useless pensions, with the idea being that the Crown's holdings would be able to support the king's expenditure without draining the government's coffers.

This parliament is seen by many historians as the central reason that Richard le Scrope, the Archbishop of York, became disillusioned with the king, after not commenting on Henry's seizure of the throne and the execution of William le Scrope, 1st Earl of Wiltshire, a relative of his. Scrope rebelled in the spring of 1405, raising 8,000 men and three knights after a propaganda campaign before being captured by Ralph de Neville, 1st Earl of Westmorland after disbanding his force per the terms of a truce. There is some evidence that the politically unsavvy archbishop was manipulated throughout these events by Henry Percy, 1st Earl of Northumberland to legitimize his revenge campaign against Henry.
