= Peace of Canterbury =

1264 agreement between the Barons and King in England

During the Second Barons' War, the Peace of Canterbury was an agreement reached between the baronial government led by Simon de Montfort on one hand, and Henry III of England and his son and heir Edward – the later King Edward I – on the other. The agreement was signed at Canterbury some time between 12 and 15 August 1264.

The Peace of Canterbury built on the previous Mise of Lewes; a settlement forced upon King Henry on the day of his defeat in the Battle of Lewes on 14 May 1264. The Canterbury settlement, however, went further than the previous settlement had done. After the Battle of Lewes, a triumvirate had been set up, consisting of Montfort, Gilbert de Clare, Earl of Gloucester, and Stephen Bersted, Bishop of Chichester. These three in turn appointed a governing council of nine men. The arrangement in effect took control of government out of the hands of King Henry, and placed it with the baronial faction led by Simon de Montfort. These arrangements were intended to be in effect temporarily, until a permanent settlement could be reached. The Peace of Canterbury, on the other hand, stated that if the conditions of the Mise of Lewes could not be met, then the council would remain in power throughout Henry's reign, and up until an unspecified point in the reign of his son Edward. There was also mention of reform of the church and royal government, particularly to do with banning foreigners from official positions.

The agreement was highly unfavourable to Henry and Edward, but it must be assumed that they agreed to it under duress, since Edward was held hostage by the barons after the defeat at Lewes. On 15 August the document was dispatched to King Louis IX of France, who previously had been acting as an arbiter between the two parties. Louis had already rejected the terms of the Mise of Lewes; the stricter conditions of the Peace of Canterbury might have been intended to bring pressure on the French king, to help bring about a settlement. King Louis, however, rejected the proposition in angry terms. He was reported to have said that he would rather break clods behind a plough than have this sort of kingly rule. After this, Montfort's government gradually started running into problems. In the spring of 1265, Gloucester defected to the side of the royalists, and Edward managed to escape his captivity. The baronial rule came to an end on 4 August 1265, when Montfort was defeated and killed at the Battle of Evesham, and Henry was restored to full powers.
