= Provisions of Oxford =

England's written constitution of 1258

The Provisions of Oxford (Latin: Provisiones Oxonie or Oxoniae) were constitutional reforms to the government of late medieval England adopted during the Oxford Parliament of 1258 to resolve a dispute between Henry III of England and his barons. The reforms were designed to ensure the king adhered to the rule of law and governed according to the advice of his barons. A council of fifteen barons was chosen to advise and control the king and supervise his ministers. Parliament was to meet regularly three times a year.

Like the earlier Magna Carta, the Provisions of Oxford demonstrated the ability of the barons to press their concerns in opposition to the English monarchy. Henry's failure to abide by the reforms sparked the Second Barons' War, which ended with Henry's victory and the restoration of royal authority. The Provisions of Oxford were annulled in 1266 by the Dictum of Kenilworth.

== Background ==
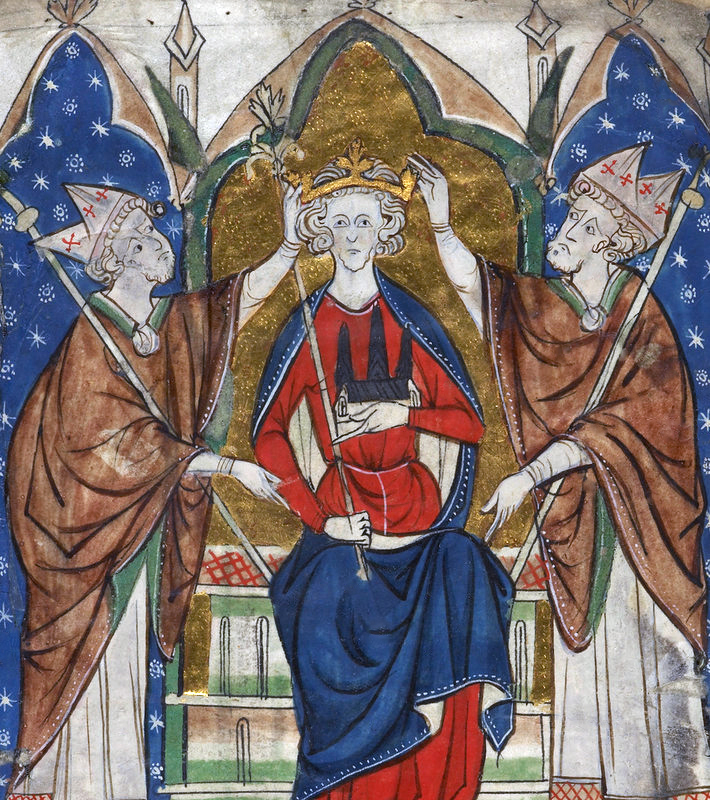
Coronation of Henry III

Henry III became king in 1216 when he was still a child, so a regency government was appointed. William Marshal, 1st Earl of Pembroke and hereditary Lord Marshal, was given the title rector regis et regni (Latin for "governor of the king and of the kingdom") until his death in 1219. The regency ended in 1223 when the king was declared of age. After the death of Marshal, the government was led by a succession of chief ministers, first Hubert de Burgh (1219–1232) and then Peter des Roches (1232–1234). Both of these ministers alienated the baronage by their accumulation of power and wealth for themselves and their families, ultimately leading to their removal from power.

Appointing ministers was traditionally a royal prerogative, but a precedent had been established by Henry's regency government of seeking the consent of Parliament. With their links to the magnates and established traditions and procedures, the great offices had functioned as a check on royal power. Under Roches, the Crown adopted a policy of subordinating the great offices (justiciar, chancellor, treasurer) to the offices of the royal household (chamberlain, keeper of the Wardrobe). The chief justiciarship lost most of its powers and was reduced to supervising the judiciary. The office was left vacant after Stephen de Segrave was dismissed in 1234. In 1238, the Lord Chancellor Ralph Neville was deprived of the great seal, which was entrusted to Wardrobe clerks. After Neville's death, the seal was entrusted to keepers and the chancellorship remained vacant. With the great seal in Henry's custody, "the king was relieved of all constraint save such as the more elastic methods of his domestic clerks might impose".

After 1240, the king's closest counselors were foreigners—Queen Eleanor's Savoyard relatives and Henry's Lusignan half-brothers. Among the barons, an opposition party formed to oppose a royal government controlled by foreigners. There was also opposition to the King's demands for taxation to pay off his debts and to the so-called Sicilian business, Henry's unrealistic plans to conquer the Kingdom of Sicily for his second son, Edmund Crouchback.

== Drafting ==
In the spring of 1258, Henry sought financial aid from Parliament and was confronted by a group of barons who insisted on reforms. The king agreed to the appointment of a committee of twenty-four members, twelve selected by the Crown and twelve by the barons.

The Twenty-Four
Royal	Baronial
Boniface of Savoy, Archbishop of Canterbury; Fulk Basset, Bishop of London; Aymer de Valence, Bishop elect of Winchester and the king's half-brother; the abbot of Westminster; Henry of Almain, the king's nephew; John de Warenne, 6th Earl of Surrey; John du Plessis, 7th Earl of Warwick; William de Valence, 1st Earl of Pembroke, the king's half-brother; Guy of Lusignan, the king's half-brother; three clerks of the royal household	Simon de Montfort, 6th Earl of Leicester; Walter de Cantilupe, Bishop of Worcester; Richard de Clare, 6th Earl of Gloucester; Humphrey de Bohun, 2nd Earl of Hereford; Roger Bigod, 4th Earl of Norfolk; Hugh Bigod; Roger Mortimer; John Fitzgeoffrey; Richard de Grey; William Bardolf; Peter de Montfort; Hugh Despenser

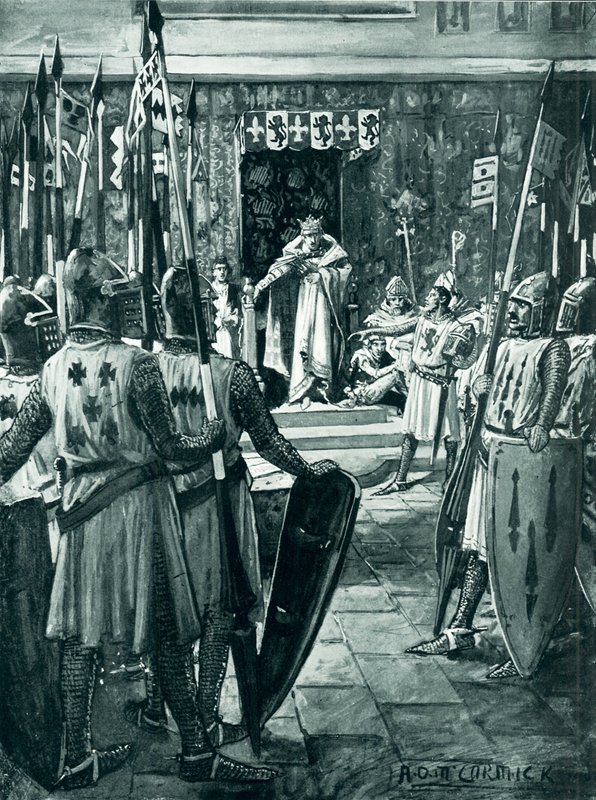
Henry III is confronted by his barons in Oxford (Arthur David McCormick, c. 1922)

Five of Henry's nominees were foreigners, and the Earl of Surrey was married to a sister of the Lusignan brothers. Among those chosen by the magnates, only Simon de Montfort was a foreigner. The Twenty-four presented their reform programme at the Oxford Parliament held in June 1258.

== Reforms ==
The provisions fit into three categories:

1. appointment and control of principal ministers,
2. the king's council, and
3. parliament.

=== Ministers ===
The office of justiciar was revived. In the past, the justiciar had been the king's chief minister and viceroy whenever he was in Normandy. After the loss of the Angevin Empire during the reign of King John, however, the office had fallen into disuse. The new justiciar would be an ex officio member of the king's council and have authority over the judiciary, including the right to hear appeals from all other courts, whether royal or baronial. He was to hold office for one year and was responsible to the king's council for his conduct. According to historian George Sayles, "[t]his was a most serious departure from previous practice, for it placed at the head of the judiciary a minister virtually independent of the king." Hugh Bigod, who was acceptable to both the king and the barons, was made justiciar.

The chancellor and treasurer were also limited to one year in office, and like the justiciar were not to take direct orders from the king. Control of royal finance was given to the exchequer, so the king was unable to divert revenues for his own spending. Local offices, such as sheriff and escheator, were also to be under annual term limits. Sheriffs were to be chosen from among local knights rather than outsiders and paid so they would not need to take bribes. New castellans were to be appointed and given custody of royal castles.

=== King's council ===
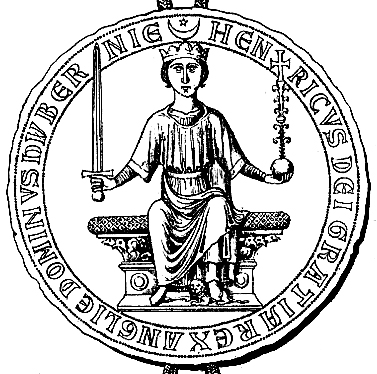
The seal of Henry III. Under the Provisions of Oxford, use of the seal was controlled by the Fifteen.

The king's council was reformed to more effectively advise and control the king. The Twenty-four selected fifteen counsellors (nine representing the barons) who were to advise the king on all matters. The Fifteen were:

1. Simon de Montfort, 6th Earl of Leicester
2. Richard de Clare, 6th Earl of Gloucester
3. Roger Bigod, 4th Earl of Norfolk
4. John du Plessis, 7th Earl of Warwick
5. Humphrey de Bohun, 2nd Earl of Hereford
6. William de Forz, 4th Earl of Albemarle
7. Peter of Savoy
8. John fitzGeoffrey
9. Peter de Montfort
10. Richard Grey
11. Roger Mortimer
12. James Audley
13. Boniface of Savoy, Archbishop of Canterbury
14. Waltere Cantilupe, Bishop of Worcester
15. John Mansel

While the Fifteen controlled the king's council, they were not the only members. The justiciar, treasurer and chancellor were always members, as were other ministers and judges. In addition, the king could still include other advisers. In fact, it was impossible for the Fifteen to constantly be on hand to advise the king. At routine council meetings, the Fifteen were represented by two or three of their number who would decide if any business was important enough to summon the full Fifteen. In addition, the chancellor was made to swear that he would not seal any important grant without the assent of a majority of the Fifteen.

=== Parliament ===
It was decided that "there be three parliaments a year ... to treat of the common wants of the kingdom, and of the king". Attending three regular parliaments each year would have been a burden for the barons. Therefore, the Twenty-four asked the parliament assembled at Oxford to choose twelve representatives who would attend the regular parliaments. This provision was not meant to limit attendance at parliament to only the twelve; rather, it guaranteed that there would be a minimum representative attendance. Recommendations for an inquest into local (mis-)government and further measures of reform were also set out.

== Implementation ==
A written confirmation of the agreement was sent to the sheriffs of all the counties of England in three languages: Latin, French and, significantly, Middle English. The use of the English language was symbolic of the anglicisation of the government of England and an antidote to the Francization which had taken place in the decades immediately before. The Provisions were the first government documents to be published in English since the Norman Conquest two hundred years before.

The reforms implemented by the Fifteen were not limited to changes in government. They also included control of the royal household. The barons determined not only the household's senior members, such as the stewards, but also the lower servants, such as cooks. A humiliated Henry was essentially treated as if he were a minor.

The Provisions of Oxford were confirmed and extended in 1259 by the Provisions of Westminster.

== Failure ==
The Provisions of Oxford were overthrown by Henry, helped by a papal bull, in 1261, seeding the start of the Second Barons' War (1263–1267). The king was defeated at the Battle of Lewes in 1264, and Simon de Montfort became the real ruler of England for the next twelve months. However, Henry was still king, and the rebels never considered removing him. Instead, Montfort called a Parliament to sanction a new form of government to control the king. The Parliament held in June 1264 approved the appointment of three electors (Montfort; Stephen Bersted, Bishop of Chichester; and Gilbert de Clare, 7th Earl of Gloucester). These men were to choose a council of nine, by whose advice the king was to rule. The electors could replace any of the nine as they saw fit, but the electors themselves could only be removed by Parliament.

Ultimately, the war was won by the king and his royalist supporters, and the Provisions of Oxford were annulled for the last time in 1266 by the Dictum of Kenilworth. Nonetheless, the administrative and legislative reforms the barons had initiated were taken up and confirmed in the Statute of Marlborough.

== Historical analysis ==
The 1258 Provisions had a significant effect upon the development of the English common law, limiting in part the expansion of royal jurisdiction by way of the number of available writs, but in the main confirming the importance of the common law of the land for all, from king to commoner.

There were weaknesses to this constitutional framework. Most significantly was the lack of any method to prevent future misconduct by the king or those following his orders. Historian G. O. Sayles notes,

If the king did wrong, he could not, save by his rarely given permission, be sued by his own writs in his own courts, and the petition of right was as yet in its early infancy ... [The petition of right] would cover wrongs done to individuals only and not render justiciable the wrongs done to subjects as a whole by the invasion of their constitutional rights ...

Neither the new role of the king nor the powers of the Fifteen was ever defined. Legal scholar Ann Lyon reflected that the provisions "have the feel, as with many of the first fumblings towards constitutional change which occur in the medieval period, and indeed much later, of being incompletely thought through."

== See also ==
- Quia Emptores
- Cestui que
- Henry de Bracton
