= Provisions of Westminster =

English constitutional reforms in 1259

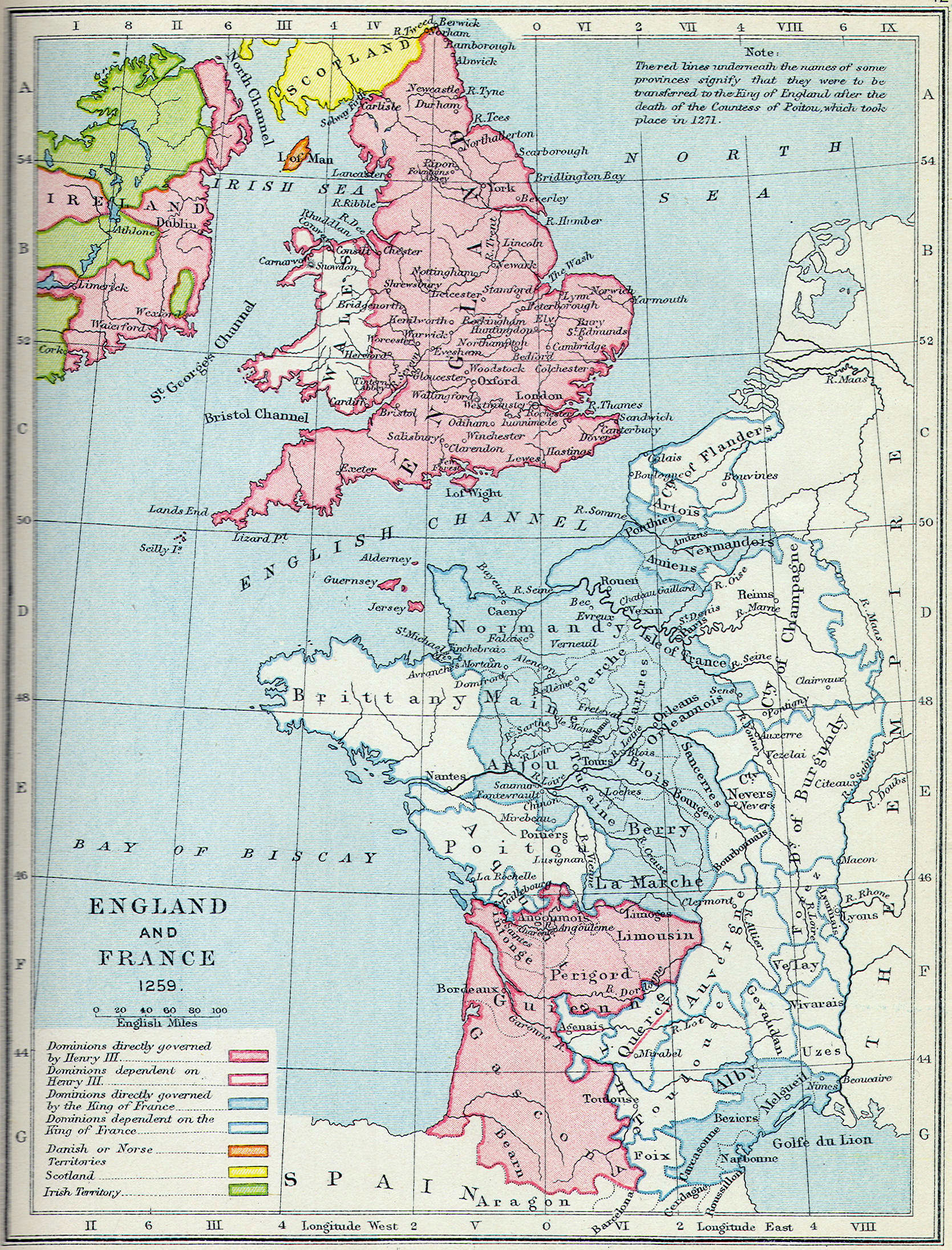
Ireland, Britain and France in 1259. Henry III's domains are pink.

The Provisions of Westminster (Latin: Provisiones Westmonasterii) of 1259 were part of a series of legislative constitutional reforms that arose out of power struggles between Henry III of England and his barons. The King's failed campaigns in France in 1230 and 1242, and his choice of friends and advisers, together with the cost of his failed scheme to make one of his younger sons King of Sicily and help the Pope against the Holy Roman Emperor, led to further disputes with the barons and united opposition in Church and State. Henry's position was not helped by the fact that his lifestyle was extravagant and his tax demands were widely resented. The King's accounts show a list of many charitable donations and payments for building works, including the rebuilding of Westminster Abbey, which began in 1245.

The Provisions themselves were an enlarged scheme of governmental reform drawn up by the committee of 24 barons who had been originally appointed under the Provisions of Oxford, which the Provisions of Westminster superseded. The new document largely reinforced many of the provisions of the earlier Provisions of Oxford, but also provided for additional inheritance and taxation reforms, including the first statutory provisions relating to Mortmain.

As a whole the Provisions consisted of a miscellaneous group of administrative and legal measures demanded by the baronial reformers and their allies during the crisis of 1258–65. The Provisions were also the first English legislation to deliberately alter existing procedures in the King's courts. The measures were also important for expanding the reform movement from the issue of baronial-royal relations to a redefinition of the barons' relations with their tenants and their mutual rights and responsibilities toward one another as enforced in the lords' own courts. In addition, the Provisions of Westminster included proposals for improving the functioning of the royal courts, chiefly new remedies in the civil sphere but also some changes in criminal justice.

Subsequent divisions among the barons themselves enabled Henry to repudiate the Provisions – helped by a papal bull – in 1261. A period of strife begun in 1263, known as the Second Barons' War, ended in a victory for the King in 1267, although the main turning point occurred in 1265 at the Battle of Evesham, where the barons' leader, Simon de Montfort was killed. The clauses of the provisions that limited monarchical authority were then annulled, but the legal clauses of the Provisions of Westminster were reaffirmed in the Statute of Marlborough (1267). The Provisions of Westminster have been described as the most important English legislation since the 1225 reissue of Magna Carta.
