= Westminster (UK Parliament constituency) =

UK parliamentary constituency in England, 1545-1918

- Former borough constituency for the House of Commons
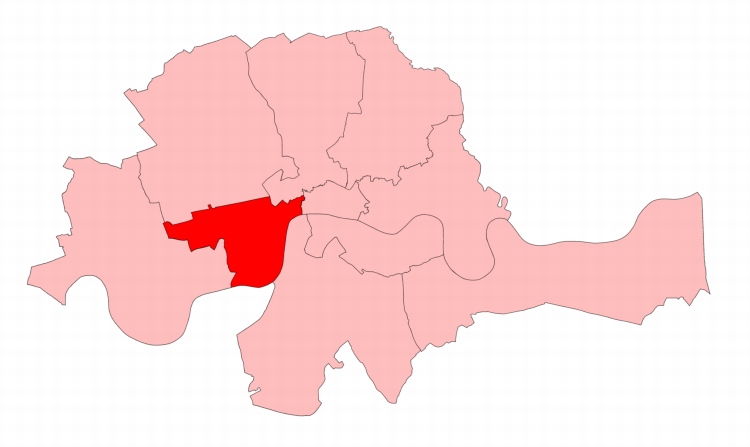
- Westminster in London 1868-85

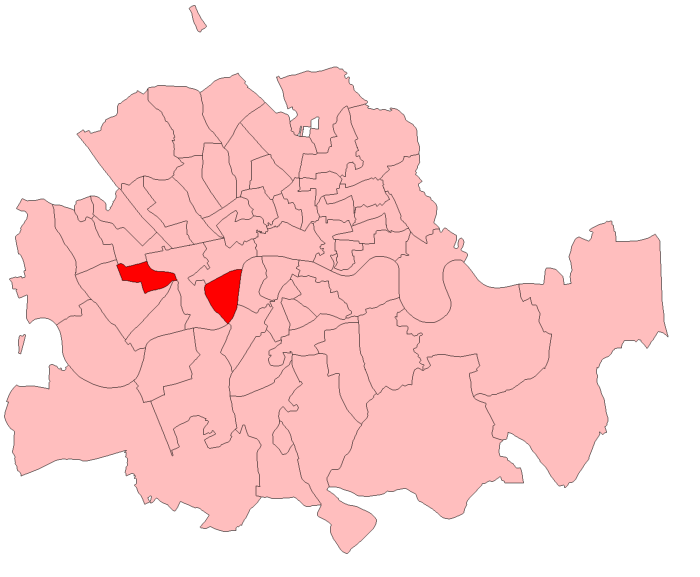
- Westminster in London 1885-1918

1545–1918
- Seats: two to 1885, then one
- Created from: Middlesex
- Replaced by: Westminster Abbey (abolished 1950); Westminster St George's (also known as Westminster, St George's Hanover Square) (received Knightsbridge exclave)
- During its existence contributed to new seat(s) of: Strand (abolished 1918); St George's, Hanover Square (abolished 1950)

Westminster was a parliamentary constituency in the Parliament of England to 1707, the Parliament of Great Britain 1707–1800 and the Parliament of the United Kingdom from 1801. It returned two members to 1885 and one thereafter.

The constituency was first known to have been represented in Parliament in 1545 and continued to exist until the redistribution of seats in 1918. The constituency's most famous former representatives are John Stuart Mill and Charles James Fox. The most analogous contemporary constituency is Cities of London and Westminster.

== Boundaries and boundary changes ==
1885-1918: The Westminster district, and Close of Collegiate Church of St. Peter.

The constituency was formed in 1545 from part of the county constituency of Middlesex and returned two members of parliament until 1885.

The City of Westminster is a district of Inner London. Its southern boundary is on the north bank of the River Thames. It is today combined with Marylebone to the north. It is west of the diminutive City of London, fixed with four MPs in 1298, and the north part of Lambeth, created a broad constituency in 1832. It is south-west of Holborn and St. Pancras which in 1832 were both placed in a wider seat named Finsbury and to the east of Kensington and Chelsea which were dealt with similarly in a seat named Chelsea.

In the 1885 redistribution of seats the constituency (virtually identical to the Metropolitan Borough of Westminster which was created in 1900) was divided into three single-member seats. The south-eastern part, including the traditional heart of Westminster and such important centres of power as the Houses of Parliament and the seat of government in Whitehall, continued to be a constituency called Westminster. By official definition the areas retained were "the Westminster district and Close of the Collegiate Church of St Peter"; a seat named Strand was created in the north-east and a seat, St George's, Hanover Square, in the west.

In the 1918 redistribution the three seats were cut to two: Westminster St George's in the west and Westminster Abbey in the east, the latter wholly containing and slightly larger than the 1885–1918 Westminster seat (except for its Knightsbridge exclave which lay some way off in the west).

== History ==
The Westminster constituency represented the centre of British government and had a large electorate so that it was independent of the control of a patron. Before the Reform Act 1832 the right to vote was held by the male inhabitants paying scot and lot (a kind of local property tax). The franchise was the largest of any borough in the kingdom, and only the county constituency of Yorkshire had more voters. Sedgwick estimated the electorate at about 8,000 in the first half of the eighteenth century. Namier and Brooke estimated that there were about 12,000 voters later in the century. The large size of the electorate made contested elections immensely expensive.

In the sixteenth century the Church officials associated with Westminster Abbey had a large influence in the area, but as the community became bigger that became less important. The Court (or His Majesty's Treasury) had some legitimate influence (by the standards of the age), because of the royal residences and government offices in the borough. The use of public funds to bribe the electorate was not unknown, during close elections (see the comments about the cost of the 1780 and 1784 contests below). Local landowners who were prepared to stir up ill-will by threatening to evict or raise the rents of tenants voting the wrong way, could also affect the result.

Unlawful means were sometimes used to make sure that the right candidates were elected. In 1722 the election of two Tories was declared void because of rioting which prevented some Whigs voting. In 1741 a Whig returning officer called upon the assistance of some troops to close the poll before the Tory candidates could catch up to the Whig votes.

The House of Commons declared the 1741 election void with the ringing resolution that "the presence of a regular body of armed soldiers at an election of members to sit in Parliament, is a high infringement of the liberties of the subject, a manifest violation of the freedom of election and an open defiance of the laws and constitution of this kingdom".

In 1749–50, the constituency saw the highly contested 1750 Westminster by-election, during which anti-ministerial factions attempted to unseat the incumbent, Viscount Trentham.

By the eighteenth century it was normal for the members to be Irish peers, the sons of peers or baronets, as it was thought appropriate for them to be of high social standing so as to be worthy to represent the seat.

Georgiana, Duchess of Devonshire and her sister at the 1788 Westminster by-election, watercolour by Robert Dighton

The Treasury spent the enormous sums of more than £8,000 in 1780 and £9,000 in 1784, in unsuccessful attempts to defeat the opposition Whig leader Charles James Fox. So expensive were these contests that for the next general election in 1790, the government and opposition leaders reached a formal agreement for each to have one member returned unopposed. However, in the event a second Whig candidate did appear, but the Tory (the famous Admiral Lord Hood) and Fox were re-elected without too much difficulty.

The last MP for this constituency, William Burdett-Coutts, was connected with a family prominent in City of Westminster politics since the eighteenth century. He himself was born in the United States in 1851, his grandparents on both sides having been British subjects. After he married Baroness Burdett-Coutts in 1881 he changed his surname from Bartlett to Burdett-Coutts. He represented the area from 1885 until 1918 and continued to sit for the Abbey division until his death in 1921.

== Lists of Members of Parliament ==
The English civil year started on 25 March until 1752 (Scotland having changed to 1 January in 1600). The years used in this article have been converted to the new style where necessary. Old style dates would be a year earlier than the new style for days between 1 January and 24 March. No attempt has been made to compensate for the eleven days which did not occur in September 1752 in both England and Scotland as well as other British controlled territories (when the day after 2 September was 14 September), so as to bring the British Empire fully in line with the Gregorian calendar.

=== Members of Parliament 1545–1660 ===
Some of the members elected during this period have been identified. The year first given is for the initial meeting of the Parliament, with the month added where there was more than one Parliament in the year. If a second year is given this is a date of dissolution. Early Parliaments sometimes only existed for a few days or weeks, so dissolutions in the same year as the first meeting are not recorded in this list If a specific date of election is known this is recorded in italic brackets. The Roman numerals in brackets, following some names, are those used to distinguish different politicians of the same name in 'The House of Commons' 1509–1558 and 1558–1603.

Year	First member	Second member
1545–1547	Robert Smallwood	John Russell (II)
1547–1552	(Sir) George Blagge, died and repl.Jan 1552 by Robert Nowell	John Rede (I)
1553 (Mar)	(Sir) Robert Southwell	Arthur Stourton
1553 (Oct)	(Sir) Robert Southwell	William Gyes
1554 (April)	William Gyes	Richard Hodges
1554 (Nov)-1555	William Jennings	William Gyes
1555	Arthur Stourton	Richard Hodges
1558	Nicholas Newdigate	John Best
1559 (elected 7 January 1559)	Richard Hodges	John Best
1563–1567 (elected 1562/3)	Robert Nowell	William Bowyer (II)
1571	Sir William Cordell	William Staunton
1572–1583	Thomas Wilbraham, died and repl. 1576 by John Osborne	John Dodington
1584–1585	Hon. Robert Cecil	Thomas Knyvett
1586–1587	Hon. Robert Cecil	Thomas Knyvett
1589 (elected 20 December 1588)	Thomas Knyvett	Peter Osborne
1593	Richard Cecil	Thomas Cole
1597–1598 (elected 27 September 1597)	Thomas Knyvett	Thomas Cole died and repl. January 1598 by Anthony Mildmay
1601 (elected 26 September 1601)	Thomas Knyvett	William Cooke (II)
1604	Sir Thomas Knyvett	Sir Walter Cope
1614	Sir Humphrey May	Edmund Doubleday
1621	Sir Edward Villiers	Edmund Doubleday (died before taking his seat and replaced by William Mann)
1624	Sir Edward Villiers	William Mann
1625	Sir Edward Villiers	William Mann
1626	Sir Robert Pye	Peter Heywood
1628	Joseph Bradshaw	Thomas Morice
Apr 1640	Sir John Glynne	William Bell
Nov 1640	Sir John Glynne	William Bell
Glynne disabled 7 September 1647 but restored 7 June 1648; Glynne and Bell both possibly secluded in Pride's Purge; Westminster unrepresented in the Rump and Barebones Parliament
1654	Thomas Latham	Thomas Falconbridge
1656	Colonel Edward Grosvenor	Edward Cary
1659	Edward Grosvenor	Richard Sherwyn

=== Members of Parliament 1660–1918 ===
Election	First Member	First Party	Second Member	Second Party
1660	Gilbert Gerard	Non-partisan	Thomas Clarges	Non-partisan
1661	Philip Warwick	Non-partisan	Richard Everard	Non-partisan
Feb. 1679	Stephen Fox	Non-partisan	William Pulteney	Non-partisan
Sep. 1679	Francis Wythens	Non-partisan	William Pulteney	Non-partisan
1680	William Waller	Non-partisan	William Pulteney	Non-partisan
Mar. 1685	Charles Bonython	Tory	Michael Arnold	Tory
Nov. 1685	Parliament prorogued			
1689	William Pulteney	Whig	Philip Howard	Whig
1690	William Pulteney	Whig	Walter Clarges	Tory
1691	Stephen Fox	Non-partisan	Walter Clarges	Tory
1695	Stephen Fox	Non-partisan	Charles Montagu	Non-partisan
1698	James Vernon	Non-partisan	Charles Montagu	Non-partisan
Jan. 1701	James Vernon	Non-partisan	Thomas Crosse	Tory
Dec. 1701	James Vernon	Non-partisan	Henry Colt	Non-partisan
1702	Walter Clarges	Tory	Thomas Crosse	Tory
1702	Henry Boyle	Non-partisan	Henry Colt	Non-partisan
1708	Henry Boyle	Non-partisan	Thomas Medlycott	Non-partisan
1710	Thomas Crosse	Tory	Thomas Medlycott	Non-partisan
1715	Thomas Crosse	Tory	Edward Wortley Montagu	Whig
Mar. 1722	Archibald Hutcheson	Tory	John Cotton	Tory
Dec. 1722	Charles Montagu	Whig	George Carpenter	Whig
1727	Charles Cavendish	Whig	William Clayton	Whig
1734	Charles Wager	Whig	William Clayton	Whig
1741	John Perceval	Tory	Charles Edwin	Tory
1747	Granville Leveson-Gower	Whig	Peter Warren	Whig
1752	Granville Leveson-Gower	Whig	Seat vacant	
1753	Granville Leveson-Gower	Whig	Edward Cornwallis	Whig
1754	John Crosse	Non-partisan	Edward Cornwallis	Whig
1761	William Pulteney	Non-partisan	Edward Cornwallis	Whig
1762	William Pulteney	Non-partisan	Edwin Sandys	Non-partisan
1763	Hugh Percy	Non-partisan	Edwin Sandys	Non-partisan
1770	Hugh Percy	Non-partisan	Robert Bernard	Non-partisan
1774	Hugh Percy	Non-partisan	Thomas Pelham-Clinton	Non-partisan
1776	Charles Stanhope	Non-partisan	Thomas Pelham-Clinton	Non-partisan
1779	George Capel-Coningsby	Non-partisan	Thomas Pelham-Clinton	Non-partisan
1780	George Brydges Rodney	Whig	Charles James Fox	Whig
1782	Cecil Wray	Whig	Charles James Fox	Whig
1784	Samuel Hood	Tory	Charles James Fox	Whig
1788	John Townshend	Whig	Charles James Fox	Whig
1790	Samuel Hood	Tory	Charles James Fox	Whig
1796	Alan Gardner	Tory	Charles James Fox	Whig
Oct. 1806	Alan Gardner	Tory	Hugh Percy	Whig
Nov. 1806	Samuel Hood	Tory	Richard Brinsley Sheridan	Whig
1807	Francis Burdett	Radical	Thomas Cochrane	Whig
Jul. 1818	Francis Burdett	Radical	Samuel Romilly	Whig
Nov. 1818	Francis Burdett	Radical	Seat vacant	
1819	Francis Burdett	Radical	George Lamb	Tory
1820	Francis Burdett	Radical	John Hobhouse	Radical
1833	Francis Burdett	Radical	De Lacy Evans	Radical
May. 1837	Francis Burdett	Conservative	De Lacy Evans	Radical
Jul. 1837	John Temple Leader	Radical	De Lacy Evans	Radical
1841	John Temple Leader	Radical	Henry John Rous	Conservative
1846	John Temple Leader	Radical	De Lacy Evans	Radical
1847	Charles Lushington	Whig	De Lacy Evans	Radical
1852	John Shelley	Whig	De Lacy Evans	Radical
1859	John Shelley	Liberal	De Lacy Evans	Liberal
1865	Robert Grosvenor	Liberal	John Stuart Mill	Liberal
1868	Robert Grosvenor	Liberal	William Henry Smith	Conservative
1874	Charles Russell	Conservative	William Henry Smith	Conservative
1882	Algernon Percy	Conservative	William Henry Smith	Conservative
1885	William Burdett-Coutts	Conservative	Seat reduced to one member	
1918	constituency abolished			

== Fictional Member of Parliament ==
Westminster was the constituency of fraudulent businessman Augustus Melmotte, who gained election as a Conservative, in Anthony Trollope's satirical novel, The Way We Live Now (published 1875).

== Elections ==
=== General notes ===
In multi-member elections the bloc voting system was used. Voters could cast a vote for one or two candidates, as they chose. The leading candidates with the largest number of votes were elected.

In by-elections and all elections after 1885, to fill a single seat, the first past the post system applied.

After 1832, when registration of voters was introduced, a turnout figure is given for contested elections. In two-member elections, when the exact number of participating voters is unknown, this is calculated by dividing the number of votes by two. To the extent that electors did not use both their votes this will be an underestimate of turnout.

Where a party had more than one candidate in one or both of a pair of successive elections change is calculated for each individual candidate, otherwise change is based on the party vote. Change figures at by-elections are from the preceding general election or the last intervening by-election. Change figures at general elections are from the last general election.

Candidates for whom no party has been identified are classified as Non Partisan. The candidate might have been associated with a party or faction in Parliament or consider himself to belong to a particular political tradition. Political parties before the nineteenth century were not as cohesive or organised as they later became. Contemporary commentators (even the reputed leaders of parties or factions) in the eighteenth century did not necessarily agree who the party supporters were. The traditional parties, which had arisen in the late seventeenth century, became increasingly irrelevant to politics in the eighteenth century (particularly after 1760), although for some contests in some constituencies party labels were still used. It was only towards the end of the century that party labels began to acquire some meaning again, although this process was by no means complete for several more generations.

Sources: The results for elections before 1790 were taken from the History of Parliament Trust publications on the House of Commons. The results from 1790 until the 1832 general election are based on Stooks Smith and from 1832 onwards on Craig. Where Stooks Smith gives additional information to the other sources this is indicated in a note.

=== Dates of Westminster general and by-elections 1660–1918 ===
- -2 Apr 1660 GE
- -- Apr 1661 GE
- 27 Feb 1679 GE
- 19 Sep 1679 GE
- 15 Nov 1680 BE
- 10 Feb 1681 GE
- 23 Mar 1685 GE
- 21 Jan 1689 GE
- 13 Mar 1690 GE
- -9 Nov 1691 BE
- 29 Oct 1695 GE
- 22 Jul 1698 GE
- 21 Jan 1701 GE
- -9 Dec 1701 GE
- -6 Aug 1702 GE
- 30 May 1705 GE
- -7 Jul 1708 GE
- -9 Oct 1710 GE
- -- --- 1713 GE
- 24 Jan 1715 GE
- 27 Mar 1722 GE (1)
- -3 Dec 1722 BE
- 15 Aug 1727 GE
- 22 Apr 1734 GE
- -8 May 1741 GE (1)
- 31 Dec 1741 BE
- -1 Jul 1747 GE
- 15 May 1750 BE
- 16 Jan 1753 BE
- 20 Apr 1754 GE
- 25 Mar 1761 GE
- 27 Apr 1762 BE
- 15 Mar 1763 BE
- 16 Mar 1768 GE
- 30 Apr 1770 BE
- 26 Oct 1774 GE
- 17 Dec 1776 BE
- 20 Apr 1779 BE
- 10 Oct 1780 GE
- -3 Apr 1782 BE
- 12 Jun 1782 BE
- -7 Apr 1783 BE
- 17 May 1784 GE
- -4 Aug 1788 BE
- -2 Jul 1790 GE
- 13 Jun 1796 GE
- 15 Jul 1802 GE
- 13 Feb 1806 BE
- -7 Oct 1806 BE
- 19 Nov 1806 GE
- 23 May 1807 GE
- -8 Oct 1812 GE
- -5 Jul 1814 (2)
- 16 Jul 1814 BE
- -4 Jul 1818 GE
- -3 Mar 1819 BE
- 25 Mar 1820 GE
- -- --- 1826 GE
- -- --- 1830 GE
- -- --- 1831 GE
- -- Feb 1832 BE
- -- --- 1832 GE
- -4 Apr 1833 BE
- 11 May 1833 BE
- -- --- 1835 GE
- 12 May 1837 BE
- 27 Jul 1837 GE
- -1 Jul 1841 GE
- 19 Feb 1846 BE
- 30 Jul 1847 GE
- -9 Jul 1852 GE
- -- --- 1857 GE
- -- --- 1859 GE
- 12 Jul 1865 GE
- 18 Nov 1868 GE
- -7 Feb 1874 GE
- 11 Aug 1877 BE
- -- --- 1880 GE
- 10 Feb 1882 BE
- 29 Jun 1885 BE
- 26 Nov 1885 GE
- -- --- 1886 GE
- -- --- 1892 GE
- -- --- 1895 GE
- -- --- 1900 GE
- -- --- 1906 GE
- -- Jan 1910 GE
- -- Dec 1910 GE

Notes:

- (1) Election declared void
- (2) Date of expulsion from the House of Lord Cochrane

=== Election results (Parliament of England) 1660–1690 ===
General Election 2 April 1660: Westminster (2 seats)
Party	Candidate	Votes	%	±%
Nonpartisan	Gilbert Gerard	Unopposed	N/A	N/A
Nonpartisan	Thomas Clarges	Unopposed	N/A	N/A

General election c. April 1661: Westminster (2 seats)
Party	Candidate	Votes	%	±%
Nonpartisan	Philip Warwick	Elected	N/A	N/A
Nonpartisan	Richard Everard	Elected	N/A	N/A
Nonpartisan	Thomas Clarges	Defeated	N/A	N/A
Nonpartisan	Thomas Elliot	Defeated	N/A	N/A

- Note (1661): Vote totals unavailable

General Election 27 February 1679: Westminster (2 seats)
Party	Candidate	Votes	%	±%
Nonpartisan	Stephen Fox	Elected	N/A	N/A
Nonpartisan	William Pulteney	Elected	N/A	N/A
Nonpartisan	Philip Matthews	Defeated	N/A	N/A
Nonpartisan	William Waller	Defeated	N/A	N/A

- Note (February 1679): Vote totals unavailable

General Election 19 September 1679: Westminster (2 seats)
Party	Candidate	Votes	%	±%
Nonpartisan	William Pulteney	Elected	N/A	N/A
Nonpartisan	Francis Wythens	Elected	N/A	N/A
Nonpartisan	William Waller	Defeated	N/A	N/A
Nonpartisan	John Cutler	Defeated	N/A	N/A
Nonpartisan	Philip Matthews	Defeated	N/A	N/A

- Note (September 1679): Vote totals unavailable
- On petition Wythens was unseated and William Waller seated on 15 November 1680

General election 10 February 1681: Westminster (2 seats)
Party	Candidate	Votes	%	±%
Nonpartisan	William Pulteney	Elected	N/A	N/A
Nonpartisan	William Waller	Elected	N/A	N/A
Nonpartisan	Richard Tufton	Defeated	N/A	N/A

- Note (1681): Vote totals unavailable

General election 23 March 1685: Westminster (2 seats)
Party	Candidate	Votes	%	±%
Tory	Charles Bonython	Elected	N/A	N/A
Tory	Michael Arnold	Elected	N/A	N/A
Whig	Gilbert Gerard	Defeated	N/A	N/A
Whig	William Dolbern	Defeated	N/A	N/A

- Note (1685): Vote totals unavailable. The candidate in this election is not the Gilbert Gerard elected in 1660, nor is he the Gilbert Gerard who was knight of the shire for Middlesex earlier in the century.

General election 21 January 1689: Westminster (2 seats)
Party	Candidate	Votes	%	±%
Whig	William Pulteney	Elected	N/A	N/A
Whig	Philip Howard	Elected	N/A	N/A
Tory	Roger Langley	Defeated	N/A	N/A
Tory	Charles Bonython	Defeated	N/A	N/A
Radical	Philip Matthews	Defeated	N/A	N/A
Tory	Walter Clarges	Defeated	N/A	N/A
Radical	James Dewey	Defeated	N/A	N/A

- Note (1689): Vote totals unavailable. Matthews and Dewey are described by Henning as radical candidates, but should not be confused with the followers of John Wilkes in the late eighteenth century or the radicals of the nineteenth century.

=== Election results (Parliament of Great Britain) 1715–1800 ===
General election 24 January 1715: Westminster (2 seats)
Party	Candidate	Votes	%	±%
Whig	Edward Wortley-Montagu	Unopposed	N/A	N/A
Tory	Thomas Crosse	Unopposed	N/A	N/A

General Election 27 March 1722: Westminster (2 seats)
Party	Candidate	Votes	%	±%
Tory	Archibald Hutcheson	4,024	32.7	N/A
Tory	John Cotton	3,853	31.4	N/A
Whig	William Lowndes	2,215	18.0	N/A
Whig	Thomas Crosse	2,197	17.9	N/A

- Robert Molesworth (W) was proposed but withdrew before the poll.
- Election declared void 6 November 1722.

By-Election 3 December 1722: Westminster (2 seats)
Party	Candidate	Votes	%	±%
Whig	Charles Montagu	4,835	30.9	+30.9
Whig	George Carpenter	4,515	28.8	+28.8
Tory	John Cotton	3,485	22.3	−9.1
Tory	Thomas Clarges	2,827	18.1	+18.1

General election 15 August 1727: Westminster (2 seats)
Party	Candidate	Votes	%	±%
Whig	Charles Cavendish	Unopposed	N/A	N/A
Whig	William Clayton	Unopposed	N/A	N/A

General election 22 April 1734: Westminster (2 seats)
Party	Candidate	Votes	%	±%
Whig	Charles Wager	Unopposed	N/A	N/A
Whig	William Clayton	Unopposed	N/A	N/A

- Clayton created an Irish peer as 1st Baron Sundon 2 June 1735

General election 8 May 1741: Westminster (2 seats)
Party	Candidate	Votes	%	±%
Whig	Charles Wager	3,686	27.0	N/A
Whig	William Clayton	3,533	25.8	N/A
Tory	Edward Vernon	3,290	24.1	New
Tory	Charles Edwin	3,161	23.1	New

- Election declared void 22 December 1741.

By-Election 31 December 1741: Westminster (2 seats)
Party	Candidate	Votes	%	±%
Tory	John Perceval	Unopposed	N/A	N/A
Tory	Charles Edwin	Unopposed	N/A	N/A

General election 1 July 1747: Westminster (2 seats)
Party	Candidate	Votes	%	±%
Whig	Granville Leveson-Gower, Viscount Trentham	2,873	42.3	N/A
Whig	Peter Warren	2,858	42.1	N/A
Tory	Thomas Clarges	544	8.0	N/A
Tory	Thomas Dyke	514	7.6	N/A

- Trentham appointed a Lord of the Admiralty

By-Election 15 May 1750: Westminster
Party	Candidate	Votes	%	±%
Whig	Granville Leveson-Gower, Viscount Trentham	4,811	50.8	+8.5
Tory	George Vandeput	4,654	49.2	+49.2
Majority		157	1.6	N/A
Whig hold		Swing	N/A	

- After a scrutiny the member returned was unchanged and vote totals were amended to Trentham 4,103; Vandeput 3,933.
- It was during the vote scrutiny, that it was noted that John London was a "Blackamoor" thereby recording the earliest known vote by a black person in Great Britain.
- Death of Warren 29 July 1752

By-Election 16 January 1753: Westminster
Party	Candidate	Votes	%	±%
Whig	Edward Cornwallis	Unopposed	N/A	N/A
Whig hold		Swing	N/A	

General election 20 April 1754: Westminster (2 seats)
Party	Candidate	Votes	%	±%
Nonpartisan	Edward Cornwallis	3,385	48.1	N/A
Nonpartisan	John Crosse	3,184	45.2	N/A
Nonpartisan	James Oglethorpe	261	3.7	N/A
Nonpartisan	Charles Sackville	209	3.0	N/A

General election 25 March 1761: Westminster (2 seats)
Party	Candidate	Votes	%	±%
Nonpartisan	Edward Cornwallis	Unopposed	N/A	N/A
Nonpartisan	William Pulteney	Unopposed	N/A	N/A

- Cornwallis appointed Governor of Gibraltar

By-Election 27 April 1762: Westminster
Party	Candidate	Votes	%	±%
Nonpartisan	Edwin Sandys	Unopposed	N/A	N/A
Nonpartisan hold		Swing	N/A	

- Death of Pulteney 11 February 1763

By-Election 15 March 1763: Westminster
Party	Candidate	Votes	%	±%
Nonpartisan	Hugh Percy	Unopposed	N/A	N/A
Nonpartisan hold		Swing	N/A	

- Lord Warkworth became known by the courtesy title of Earl Percy from 1766, when his father was advanced in the peerage from Earl to Duke of Northumberland

General election 16 March 1768: Westminster (2 seats)
Party	Candidate	Votes	%	±%
Nonpartisan	Edwin Sandys	Unopposed	N/A	N/A
Nonpartisan	Hugh Percy	Unopposed	N/A	N/A

- Succession of Sandys as 2nd Baron Sandys 21 April 1770

By-Election 30 April 1770: Westminster
Party	Candidate	Votes	%	±%
Nonpartisan	Robert Bernard	Unopposed	N/A	N/A
Nonpartisan hold		Swing	N/A	

General election 26 October 1774: Westminster (2 seats)
Party	Candidate	Votes	%	±%
Government/Northite	Hugh Percy	4,994	33.8	N/A
Government/Northite	Thomas Pelham-Clinton	4,774	32.3	N/A
Radical	Hervey Redmond Morres	2,531	17.1	N/A
Radical	Charles Stanhope	2,342	15.9	N/A
Nonpartisan	Humphrey Cotes	130	0.9	N/A

- Succession of Percy to his mother's title, as 3rd Baron Percy on 5 December 1776

By-Election 17 December 1776: Westminster
Party	Candidate	Votes	%	±%
Nonpartisan	Charles Stanhope	Unopposed	N/A	N/A
Nonpartisan hold		Swing	N/A	

- Succession of Petersham as 3rd Earl of Harrington 1 April 1779

By-Election 20 April 1779: Westminster
Party	Candidate	Votes	%	±%
Nonpartisan	George Capell-Coningsby	Unopposed	N/A	N/A
Nonpartisan hold		Swing	N/A	

- Pelham-Clinton was known by the courtesy title of Earl of Lincoln, following the death of his brother in 1779

General election 10 October 1780: Westminster (2 seats)
Party	Candidate	Votes	%	±%
Whig	George Brydges Rodney	4,994	35.6	+35.6
Whig	Charles James Fox	4,878	34.8	+34.8
Tory	Thomas Pelham-Clinton	4,157	29.6	−2.7

- Note: (1780): Poll 21 days; 9,136 voted; party labels. (Source: Stooks Smith)
- Appointment of Fox as Secretary of State for Foreign Affairs 27 March 1782

By-Election 3 April 1782: Westminster
Party	Candidate	Votes	%	±%
Whig	Charles James Fox	Unopposed	N/A	N/A
Whig hold		Swing	N/A	

- Creation of Rodney as 1st Baron Rodney 19 June 1782

By-Election 12 June 1782: Westminster
Party	Candidate	Votes	%	±%
Whig	Cecil Wray	Unopposed	N/A	N/A
Whig hold		Swing	N/A	

- Appointment of Fox as Secretary of State for Foreign Affairs 2 April 1783

By-Election 7 April 1783: Westminster
Party	Candidate	Votes	%	±%
Whig	Charles James Fox	Unopposed	N/A	N/A
Whig hold		Swing	N/A	

General election 17 May 1784: Westminster (2 seats)
Party	Candidate	Votes	%	±%
Tory	Samuel Hood	6,588	35.4	+35.4
Whig	Charles James Fox	6,126	32.9	−1.9
Whig	Cecil Wray	5,895	31.7	+31.7

- Note (1784): Poll 40 days; 12,301 voted. After a scrutiny the members returned were unchanged and vote totals were amended to the figures as above. Original votes Hood 6,694; Fox 6,234; Wray 5,998. (Source: Stooks Smith)
- Hood and Fox were declared elected 4 March 1785
- Appointment of Hood as a Commissioner of the Admiralty 16 July 1788

By-Election 4 August 1788: Westminster
Party	Candidate	Votes	%	±%
Whig	John Townshend	6,392	53.4	+53.4
Tory	Samuel Hood	5,569	46.6	+11.2
Majority		823	6.9	N/A
Whig gain from Tory		Swing	N/A	

- Note (1788): Poll 15 days. (Source: Stooks Smith)

General election 2 July 1790: Westminster (2 seats)
Party	Candidate	Votes	%	±%
Whig	Charles James Fox	3,516	41.8	+8.9
Tory	Samuel Hood	3,217	38.2	+2.8
Whig	John Horne Tooke	1,679	20.0	+20.0

- Note (1790): Poll 15 days. Mr Tooke proposed himself. (Source: Stooks Smith)

General election 13 June 1796: Westminster (2 seats)
Party	Candidate	Votes	%	±%
Whig	Charles James Fox	5,160	40.3	−1.5
Tory	Alan Gardner	4,814	37.6	−0.6
Whig	John Horne Tooke	2,819	22.0	+2.1

- Expulsion of Fox from the Privy Council 9 May 1798
- Creation of Gardner as an Irish peer, 1st Baron Gardner 29 December 1800

=== Election results (Parliament of the United Kingdom) ===
General election 15 July 1802: Westminster (2 seats)
Party	Candidate	Votes	%	±%
Whig	Charles James Fox	2,671	39.3	−1.0
Tory	Alan Gardner	2,431	35.8	−1.9
Radical	John Graham (Westminster candidate)	1,693	24.9	New
Majority		4,124	10.9	−4.7
Turnout		6,795		
Whig hold		Swing		
Tory hold		Swing		

- Note (1802): Poll 9 days. (Source: Stooks Smith)
- Appointment of Fox as Secretary of State for Foreign Affairs 7 February 1806

By-Election 13 February 1806: Westminster
Party	Candidate	Votes	%	±%
Whig	Charles James Fox	Unopposed	N/A	N/A
Whig hold				

- Death of Fox 13 September 1806

By-Election 7 October 1806: Westminster
Party	Candidate	Votes	%	±%
Whig	Hugh Percy	Unopposed	N/A	N/A
Whig hold				

General election 19 November 1806: Westminster (2 seats)
Party	Candidate	Votes	%	±%
Tory	Samuel Hood	5,478	37.2	+1.4
Whig	Richard Brinsley Sheridan	4,758	32.3	−7.0
Radical	James Paull	4,481	30.5	+5.6
Majority		277	1.8	N/A
Turnout		14,717		
Tory hold		Swing		
Whig gain from Radical		Swing		

- Note (1806): Poll 15 days; 10,277 voted. (Source: Stooks Smith)

General election 23 May 1807: Westminster (2 seats)
Party	Candidate	Votes	%	±%
Whig	Francis Burdett	5,134	37.0	+37.0
Whig	Thomas Cochrane	3,708	26.8	+26.8
Whig	Richard Brinsley Sheridan	2,615	18.9	−13.5
Tory	John Elliot (Westminster candidate)	2,137	15.4	−21.8
Radical	James Paull	269	1.9	−28.6
Majority		1,571	11.4	N/A
Turnout		13,594		
Whig gain from Tory		Swing		
Whig hold		Swing		

- Note (1807): Poll 15 days; 8,622 voted. (Source: Stooks Smith)

General election 8 October 1812: Westminster (2 seats)
Party	Candidate	Votes	%	±%
Whig	Francis Burdett	Unopposed	N/A	N/A
Whig	Thomas Cochrane	Unopposed	N/A	N/A

- Expulsion of Cochrane from the House of Commons, after being convicted of conspiracy, 5 July 1814

By-Election 16 July 1814: Westminster
Party	Candidate	Votes	%	±%
Whig	Thomas Cochrane	Unopposed	N/A	N/A
Whig hold				

General election 4 July 1818: Westminster (2 seats)
Party	Candidate	Votes	%	±%
Whig	Samuel Romilly	5,339	34.3	N/A
Whig	Francis Burdett	5,238	33.7	N/A
Tory	Murray Maxwell	4,808	30.9	New
Radical	Henry Hunt	84	0.5	N/A
Whig	Douglas Kinnaird	65	0.4	N/A
Radical	John Cartwright	23	0.2	N/A
Majority		430	2.8	−8.6
Turnout		15,557		
Whig hold		Swing		
Whig hold		Swing		

- Note (1818): Poll 15 days; 10,277 voted. (Source: Stooks Smith)
- Death of Romilly 2 November 1818

By-Election 3 March 1819: Westminster
Party	Candidate	Votes	%	±%
Tory	George Lamb	4,465	53.38	+22.47
Whig	John Hobhouse	3,861	46.2	+46.2
Radical	John Cartwright	38	0.5	+0.3
Majority		604	7.2	N/A
Turnout		8,364		
Tory gain from Whig		Swing		

- Note (1819): Poll 15 days. (Source: Stooks Smith)

General election 25 March 1820: Westminster (2 seats)
Party	Candidate	Votes	%	±%
Whig	Francis Burdett	5,327	36.4	+2.7
Whig	John Hobhouse	4,882	33.3	+33.3
Tory	George Lamb	4,436	30.3	−0.6
Majority		446	3.0	+0.2
Turnout		14,645		
Whig hold		Swing		
Whig hold		Swing		

- Note (1820): Poll 15 days; 9,280 voted. (Source: Stooks Smith)

General election 1826: Westminster (2 seats)
Party	Candidate	Votes	%	±%
Whig	Francis Burdett	Unopposed	N/A	N/A
Whig	John Hobhouse	Unopposed	N/A	N/A

General election 1830: Westminster (2 seats)
Party	Candidate	Votes	%	±%
Radical	Francis Burdett	Unopposed		
Radical	John Hobhouse	Unopposed		
Radical hold				
Radical hold				

General election 1831: Westminster (2 seats)
Party	Candidate	Votes	%	±%
Radical	Francis Burdett	Unopposed		
Radical	John Hobhouse	Unopposed		
Radical hold				
Radical hold				

- Appointment of Hobhouse as Secretary at War

By-election, February 1832: Westminster
Party	Candidate	Votes	%	±%
Radical	John Hobhouse	Unopposed		
Radical hold				

General election 1832: Westminster (2 seats)
Party	Candidate	Votes	%	±%
Radical	Francis Burdett	3,248	43.1	N/A
Radical	John Hobhouse	3,214	42.6	N/A
Radical	De Lacy Evans	1,076	14.3	N/A
Majority		2,138	28.3	N/A
Turnout		4,453	38.5	N/A
Registered electors		11,576		
Radical hold		Swing	N/A	
Radical hold		Swing	N/A	

- Appointment of Hobhouse as Chief Secretary for Ireland

By-election, 4 April 1833: Westminster
Party	Candidate	Votes	%	±%
Radical	John Hobhouse	Unopposed		
Radical hold				

- Resignation of Hobhouse, by accepting the office of Steward of the Chiltern Hundreds, after he left the Ministry in opposition to the House and Window taxes.

By-election, 11 May 1833: Westminster
Party	Candidate	Votes	%	±%
Radical	De Lacy Evans	2,027	44.1	+29.8
Radical	John Hobhouse	1,835	39.9	−2.7
Tory	Bickham Escott	738	16.0	New
Majority		1,097	23.8	−4.5
Turnout		4,600	39.7	+1.2
Registered electors		11,576		
Radical hold		Swing	N/A	

General election 1835: Westminster (2 seats)
Party	Candidate	Votes	%	±%
Radical	Francis Burdett	2,747	40.0	−3.1
Radical	De Lacy Evans	2,588	37.7	+23.4
Conservative	Thomas John Cochrane	1,528	22.3	N/A
Majority		1,060	15.4	−12.9
Turnout		4,254	32.1	−6.4
Registered electors		13,268		
Radical hold		Swing	N/A	
Radical hold		Swing	N/A	

- Resignation of Burdett to seek re-election on changing parties.

Result of the 1837 by-election by parish
Burdett — 50-55%
Burdett — 55-60%
Burdett — 65-70%
Leader — 50-55%
Leader — 55-60%

By-election, 12 May 1837: Westminster
Party	Candidate	Votes	%	±%
Conservative	Francis Burdett	3,567	53.9	+31.6
Radical	John Temple Leader	3,052	46.1	−31.6
Majority		515	7.8	N/A
Turnout		6,619	43.4	+11.3
Registered electors		15,262		
Conservative gain from Radical		Swing	+31.6	

1837 election by two-party vote:
Radical — 50-55%
Radical — 60-65%
Radical — 65-70%
Conservative — 50-55%
Conservative — 55-60%

1837 election by individual candidate:
Leader — 35-40%
Leader — 40-45%
Evans — 35-40%
Murray — 30-35%
Murray — 40-45%

General election 27 July 1837: Westminster (2 seats)
Party	Candidate	Votes	%	±%
Radical	John Temple Leader	3,793	37.5	−2.5
Radical	De Lacy Evans	3,715	36.7	−1.0
Conservative	George Murray	2,620	25.9	+3.6
Majority		1,095	10.8	−4.6
Turnout		6,350	41.6	+9.5
Registered electors		15,262		
Radical hold		Swing	−2.2	
Radical hold		Swing	−1.4	

1841 election by two-party vote:
Conservative — 50-55%
Conservative — 55-60%
Conservative — 60-65%
Radical — 50-55%
Radical — 55-60%
Radical — 65-70%

1841 election by individual candidate:
Rous — 30-35%
Rous — 35-40%
Rous — 40-45%
Leader — 35-40%
Leader — 40-45%
Evans — 30-35%
Evans — 35-40%

General election 1 July 1841: Westminster (2 seats)
Party	Candidate	Votes	%	±%
Conservative	Henry John Rous	3,338	33.8	+7.9
Radical	John Temple Leader	3,281	33.2	−4.3
Radical	De Lacy Evans	3,258	33.0	−3.7
Majority		80	0.8	N/A
Turnout		6,596	47.9	+6.3
Registered electors		13,767		
Conservative gain from Radical		Swing	+7.9	
Radical hold		Swing	−4.1	

- Appointment of Rous as a Lord Commissioner of the Admiralty

By-election, 19 February 1846: Westminster
Party	Candidate	Votes	%	±%
Radical	De Lacy Evans	3,843	56.9	−10.7
Conservative	Henry John Rous	2,906	43.1	+10.6
Majority		937	13.8	N/A
Turnout		6,749	45.6	−2.3
Registered electors		14,801		
Radical gain from Conservative		Swing	−10.7	

General election 30 July 1847: Westminster (2 seats)
Party	Candidate	Votes	%	±%
Radical	De Lacy Evans	3,139	29.1	−38.5
Whig	Charles Lushington	2,831	26.3	N/A
Whig	Charles Cochrane	2,819	26.2	N/A
Conservative	William Montagu	1,985	18.4	−16.1
Turnout		7,185	49.3	+1.4
Registered electors		14,572		
Majority		308	2.9	N/A
Radical hold		Swing		
Majority		846	7.9	N/A
Whig gain from Conservative		Swing		

- Note (1847): 14,125 registered (Craig's figure above used for the turnout calculation); 7,185 voted. Evans was classified as a Radical, Lushington and Cochrane as Whigs and Rous as a Tory. (Source: Stooks Smith)

General election 9 July 1852: Westminster (2 seats)
Party	Candidate	Votes	%	±%
Whig	John Shelley	4,199	32.2	−20.3
Radical	De Lacy Evans	3,756	28.8	−0.3
Conservative	William Montagu	3,373	25.9	+7.5
Radical	William Coningham	1,716	13.2	N/A
Turnout		6,522 (est)	43.8 (est)	−5.5
Registered electors		14,883		
Majority		443	3.4	−4.5
Whig hold		Swing	−10.0	
Majority		383	2.9	—
Radical hold		Swing	−3.9	

General election 1857: Westminster (2 seats)
Party	Candidate	Votes	%	±%
Radical	De Lacy Evans	Unopposed		
Whig	John Shelley	Unopposed		
Registered electors		13,182		
Radical hold				
Whig hold				

General election 1859: Westminster (2 seats)
Party	Candidate	Votes	%	±%
Liberal	De Lacy Evans	Unopposed		
Liberal	John Shelley	Unopposed		
Registered electors		13,801		
Liberal hold				
Liberal hold				

General election 12 July 1865: Westminster (2 seats)
Party	Candidate	Votes	%	±%
Liberal	Robert Grosvenor	4,534	35.2	N/A
Liberal	John Stuart Mill	4,525	35.1	N/A
Liberal-Conservative	William Henry Smith	3,824	29.7	New
Majority		701	5.4	N/A
Turnout		8,354 (est)	66.6 (est)	N/A
Registered electors		12,546		
Liberal hold		Swing	N/A	
Liberal hold		Swing	N/A	

- William Henry Smith described himself as a 'Liberal-Conservative' in support of Liberal prime minister Lord Palmerston.

General election 12 November 1868: Westminster (2 seats)
Party	Candidate	Votes	%	±%
Conservative	William Henry Smith	7,648	37.3	+7.6
Liberal	Robert Grosvenor	6,584	32.1	−3.1
Liberal	John Stuart Mill	6,284	30.6	−4.5
Majority		1,064	5.7	N/A
Turnout		14,082 (est)	74.6 (est)	+8.0
Registered electors		18,879		
Conservative gain from Liberal		Swing	+7.6	
Liberal hold		Swing	−3.5	

General election 7 February 1874: Westminster (2 seats)
Party	Candidate	Votes	%	±%
Conservative	William Henry Smith	9,371	35.7	+17.0
Conservative	Charles Russell	8,681	33.1	+14.4
Liberal	Thomas Buxton	4,749	18.1	−14.0
Liberal	William Codrington	3,435	13.1	−17.5
Majority		3,932	15.0	+9.3
Turnout		13,118 (est)	66.1 (est)	−8.5
Registered electors		19,845		
Conservative hold		Swing	+16.4	
Conservative gain from Liberal		Swing	+15.1	

- Appointment of Smith as First Lord of the Admiralty

By-election, 11 August 1877: Westminster
Party	Candidate	Votes	%	±%
Conservative	William Henry Smith	Unopposed		
Conservative hold				

General election 1880: Westminster (2 seats)
Party	Candidate	Votes	%	±%
Conservative	William Henry Smith	9,093	29.3	−6.4
Conservative	Charles Russell	8,930	28.8	−4.3
Liberal	John Morley	6,564	21.2	+3.1
Liberal	Arthur Hobhouse	6,443	20.8	+7.7
Majority		2,366	7.6	−7.4
Turnout		15,515 (est)	73.6 (est)	+7.5
Registered electors		21,081		
Conservative hold		Swing	−4.8	
Conservative hold		Swing	−6.0	

- Resignation of Russell

By-Election 10 February 1882: Westminster
Party	Candidate	Votes	%	±%
Conservative	Algernon Percy	Unopposed		
Conservative hold				

- Appointment of Smith as Secretary of State for War

By-Election 29 June 1885: Westminster
Party	Candidate	Votes	%	±%
Conservative	William Henry Smith	Unopposed		
Conservative hold				

- Constituency reduced to one seat and boundaries changed in the redistribution of 1885

== Election results 1885–1918 ==
Decades:	1880s; 1890s; 1900s; 1910s

=== Elections in the 1880s ===
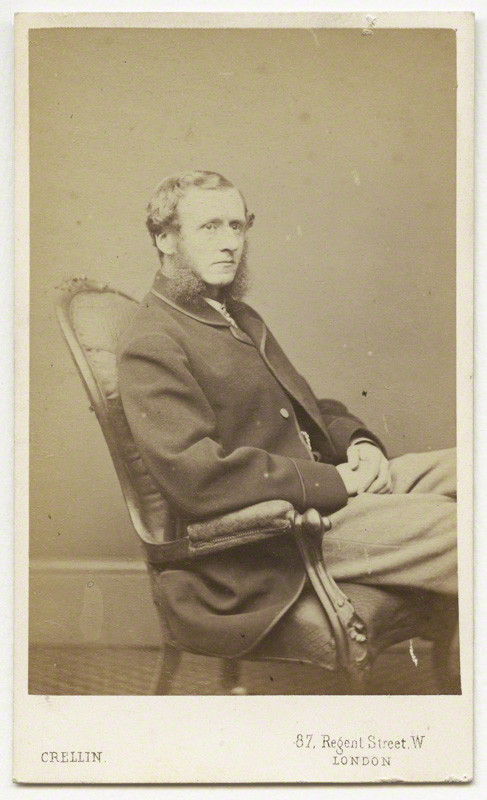
Beesly

General election 1885: Westminster
Party	Candidate	Votes	%	±%
Conservative	William Burdett-Coutts	3,991	69.7	+11.6
Liberal	Edward Spencer Beesly	1,736	30.3	−11.7
Majority		2,255	39.4	+31.8
Turnout		5,727	74.7	+1.1 (est)
Registered electors		7,670		
Conservative hold		Swing	+11.7	

General election 1886: Westminster
Party	Candidate	Votes	%	±%
Conservative	William Burdett-Coutts	Unopposed		
Conservative hold				

=== Elections in the 1890s ===
Jones

General election 1892: Westminster
Party	Candidate	Votes	%	±%
Conservative	William Burdett-Coutts	3,548	64.9	N/A
Liberal	Leif Jones	1,916	35.1	New
Majority		1,632	29.8	N/A
Turnout		5,464	68.5	N/A
Registered electors		7,971		
Conservative hold				

General election 1895: Westminster
Party	Candidate	Votes	%	±%
Conservative	William Burdett-Coutts	Unopposed		
Conservative hold				

=== Elections in the 1900s ===
General election 1900: Westminster
Party	Candidate	Votes	%	±%
Conservative	William Burdett-Coutts	2,715	86.1	N/A
Ind. Conservative	H.H. Montague-Smith	439	13.9	New
Majority		2,276	72.2	N/A
Turnout		3,154	42.8	N/A
Registered electors		7,367		
Conservative hold				

General election 1906: Westminster
Party	Candidate	Votes	%	±%
Conservative	William Burdett-Coutts	3,167	60.7	−25.4
Liberal	Vere Hobart	2,054	39.3	New
Majority		1,113	21.4	−50.8
Turnout		5,221	69.3	+26.5
Registered electors		7,539		
Conservative hold				

=== Elections in the 1910s ===
General election January 1910: Westminster
Party	Candidate	Votes	%	±%
Conservative	William Burdett-Coutts	3,917	69.1	+8.4
Liberal	Vere Hobart	1,751	30.9	−8.4
Majority		2,166	38.2	+16.8
Turnout		7,284	77.8	+8.5
Conservative hold		Swing	+8.4	

General election December 1910: Westminster
Party	Candidate	Votes	%	±%
Conservative	William Burdett-Coutts	3,397	73.4	+4.3
Liberal	Harry de Pass	1,228	26.6	−4.3
Majority		2,169	46.8	+8.6
Turnout		7,284	63.5	−14.3
Conservative hold		Swing	+4.3	

== See also ==
- List of parliamentary constituencies in London
- Duration of English, British and United Kingdom parliaments from 1660

== Bibliography ==
- Boundaries of Parliamentary Constituencies 1885–1972, compiled and edited by F.W.S. Craig (Political Reference Publications 1972)
- British Parliamentary Election Results 1832–1885, compiled and edited by F.W.S. Craig (The Macmillan Press 1977)
- British Parliamentary Election Results 1885–1918, compiled and edited by F.W.S. Craig (The Macmillan Press 1974)
- The House of Commons 1509–1558, by S.T. Bindoff (Secker & Warburg 1982)
- The House of Commons 1558–1603, by P.W. Hasler (HMSO 1981)
- The House of Commons 1660–1690, by Basil Duke Henning (Secker & Warburg 1983)
- The House of Commons 1715–1754, by Romney Sedgwick (HMSO 1970)
- The House of Commons 1754–1790, by Sir Lewis Namier and John Brooke (HMSO 1964)
- The House of Commons 1790–1820, by R.G. Thorne (Secker & Warburg 1986)
- The Parliaments of England by Henry Stooks Smith (1st edition published in three volumes 1844–50), second edition edited (in one volume) by F.W.S. Craig (Political Reference Publications 1973)
- Who's Who of British Members of Parliament: Volume I 1832–1885, edited by M. Stenton (The Harvester Press 1976)
- Leigh Rayment's Historical List of MPs – Constituencies beginning with "W" (part 3)
