= Sir Richard Everard, 2nd Baronet =

Sir Richard Everard, 2nd Baronet (1624 – 29 August 1694) was an English politician who sat in the House of Commons from 1661 to 1679.

Everard was the son of Sir Richard Everard, 1st Baronet of Much Waltham, Essex and his first wife Joan Barrington, daughter of Sir Francis Barrington, 1st Baronet and his wife Joan Cromwell, daughter of Sir Henry Cromwell. In 1661, he was elected Member of Parliament for Westminster in the Cavalier Parliament. He succeeded to the Baronetcy about 1680. Everard died at the age of 69, and was buried at Waltham.

Everard married firstly, in or before 1647, Elizabeth Gibb, daughter of Sir Henry Gibb, Baronet and his wife Anne Gibbs, daughter of Sir Ralph Gibbs, of Honiton, Warwickshire. He married secondly, Jane Finet, daughter of Sir John Finet, Master of the Ceremonies.

Parliament of England
Preceded by Gilbert Gerard; Thomas Clarges	Member of Parliament for Westminster; 1661–1679; With: Sir Philip Warwick	Succeeded by Sir Stephen Fox; Sir William Pulteney
Baronetage of England
Preceded by Richard Everard	Baronet (of Much Waltham); 1680–1694	Succeeded by Hugh Everard
