= Thomas Cole (Westminster MP) =

English politician

Thomas Cole (d. November 1597) was an English politician who was elected to sit in the House of Commons for Westminster in 1593 and 1597.

He married Margaret Cresfelde (d. 1599) in Westminster in December 1572 and the couple had a son and two daughters. Thomas Cole served as churchwarden for St Margaret's between 1592 and 1594.

The brass memorial to Cole erected by his wife in St Margaret's, Westminster survived, when all the others then in the church were melted down during the English Civil War to provide brass for cannons. The biographical information in the doggerel poem of the memorial indicates that he was not the Cambridge educated lawyer of the same name who died in London in the same year, as suggested by the History of Parliament.

Parliament of England
Preceded by Thomas Knyvett; Peter Osborne	Member of Parliament for Westminster; 1593-1597; With: Richard Cecil; Thomas Knyvett	Succeeded by Anthony Mildmay
