= Richard Hodges =

Richard Hodges may refer to:

- Richard Hodges (archaeologist) (born 1952), British archaeologist
- Richard Hodges (American politician) (born 1963), former member of the Ohio House of Representatives
- Richard Hodges (MP) (died 1572), member (MP) of the Parliament of England for Westminster
- Richard Hodges (surgeon) (1827–1896), American surgeon
