= John Dodington =

John Dodington or Doddington may refer to:

- John Dodington (bass), Canadian singer
- John Dodington (died 1585), MP for Westminster
- John Doddington (fl. 1640), MP
