= Archibald Hutcheson =

British barrister and British Member of Parliament

Archibald Hutcheson (ca. 1659 – 12 August 1740) was a British politician who sat in the House of Commons from 1713 to 1727.

Hutcheson was the son of Archibald Hutcheson of Stranocum, Co. Antrim. He trained as a barrister and was called to the bar in 1683. He was appointed Attorney General of the Leeward Islands (1688–1702) and in November, 1708 elected a Fellow of the Royal Society.

== Career ==
Hutcheson was returned as Member of Parliament (MP) for the constituency of Hastings at the 1713 general election and held the seat until 1727. He was also elected MP for Westminster at the 1722 general election, but that election was declared void because he was at that time still the member for Hastings. Westminster was the borough constituency with the largest electorate before the Reform Act 1832 (estimated by Namier and Brooke at about 12,000 voters later in the eighteenth century). Contested elections there were often hard-fought.

He was an impassioned opponent of the repeal of the Triennial Act 1694. He was also an early critic of the South Sea Company, producing numerous pamphlets on the company.

In his old age he took part in the efforts of Thomas Coram and others to establish a home for abandoned children in London. In 1739, the year before Hutcheson's death, a royal charter was granted by George II for a new charity which became known as the Foundling Hospital. The Charter listed Hutcheson as one of the founding governors.

== Personal life ==
Hutcheson married four times, firstly in 1697 to Mary Smith, secondly in 1715 to Dame Mary, of Stepney, widow of Sir John Gayer of the East India Company, thirdly about 1727 to Rebecca Bankes and fourthly about 1730 to Elizabeth Stewart (née Lawrence), widow of Colonel Robert Stewart of Montserrat. From 1732 to his death in 1740, he had a London home at 2 Upper Brook Street, Mayfair.

He died without living issue. Elizabeth, on Hutcheson's death, went at his wish, to join the household of William Law at King's Cliffe, Northamptonshire, where she is buried in the parish churchyard.

Parliament of Great Britain
Preceded by William Ashburnham; Sir Joseph Martin	Member of Parliament for Hastings; 1713–1727; With: Sir Joseph Martin 1713–1715; Henry Pelham 1715–1722; William Ashburnham 1722–1727	Succeeded by Thomas Townshend; William Ashburnham
Preceded by Sir Thomas Crosse; Edward Wortley Montagu	Member of Parliament for Westminster; March 1722 – December 1722; With: John Cotton	Succeeded by Charles Montagu; The Lord Carpenter
