= John Russell (Westminster MP) =

16th-century English politician

John Russell was an English politician. He was the Member of Parliament for Westminster, London in 1545–1547 along with Robert Smallwood.
