= Humphrey May =

English courtier and Member of Parliament (1573–1630)

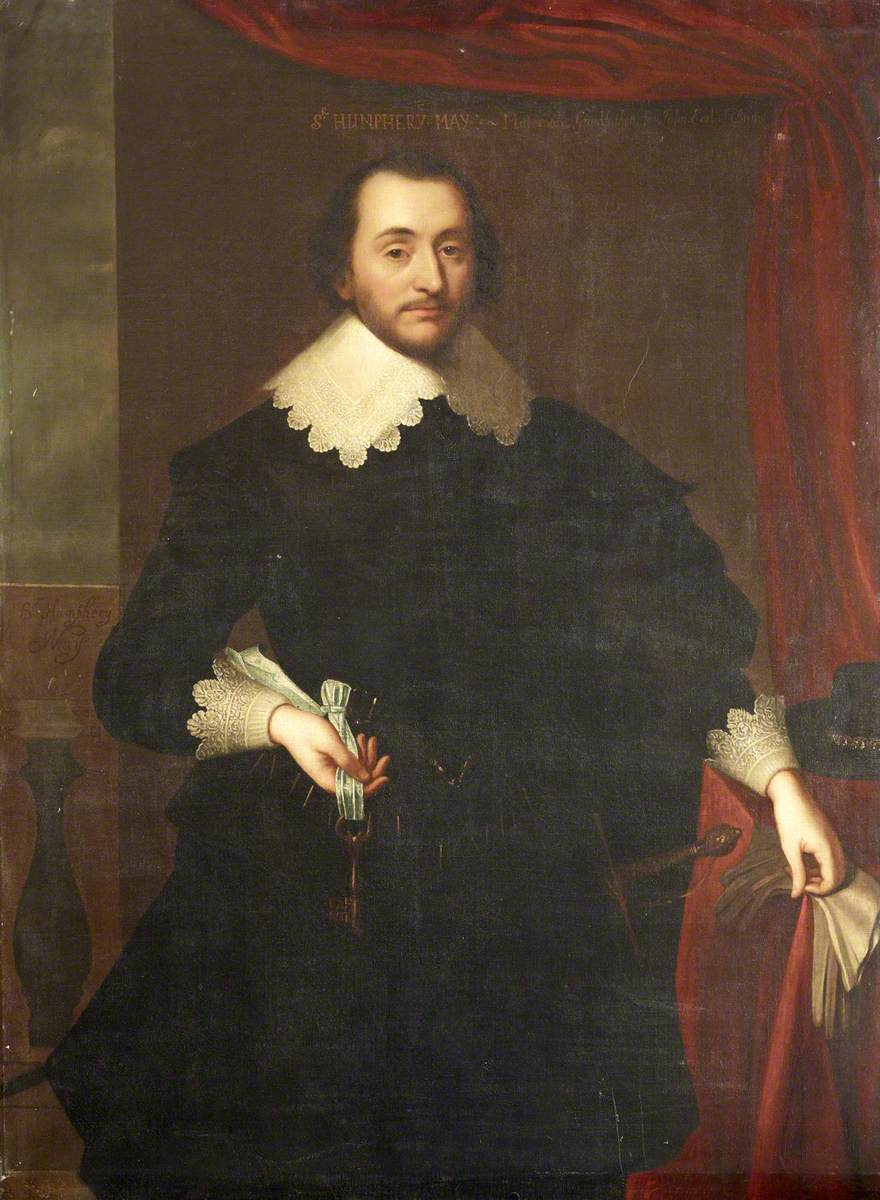
Sir Humphrey May

Sir Humphrey May (1573 – 9 June 1630) was an English courtier and politician who sat in the House of Commons between 1605 and 1629.

== Career ==
May was the fourth son of Richard May, Merchant Tailor of London. He matriculated from St John's College, Oxford on 25 October 1588, graduated B.A. on 3 March 1592, and became student of the Middle Temple in 1592. In February 1604, he was groom of the King's privy chamber.

May was elected Member of Parliament for Beeralston at a by-election in 1605. In 1613 he was sent to Calais to prevent the Earl of Essex and Henry Howard fighting a duel.

In 1614 he was elected MP for Westminster. He was elected MP for Lancaster in 1621. In 1624, he was elected MP for Lancaster and also for Leicester and chose to sit for Leicester. In 1625 he was elected MP for Lancaster and Leicester again, but this time chose to sit for Lancaster. He was elected MP for Leicester again in 1626 and 1628 and sat until 1629 when King Charles decided to rule without parliament for eleven years.

He held the office of Vice-Chamberlain of the Household and Master of the Rolls to King Charles I. He was also appointed Chancellor of the Duchy of Lancaster

May died at his house at St Martin-in-the-Fields in 1630, at the age of about 57, and was buried in Westminster Abbey.

== Marriage and issue ==
May married twice. He married firstly Jane Uvedale, sister of Sir William Uvedale, of Wickham, Hampshire, by whom he had two daughters and two sons – James of Coldrey and Sir Algernon of Greenwich – before Jane died giving birth to another son, Richard, in May 1615.

He married secondly, on 3 February 1616, at Bury St. Edmunds, Judith Pooley, daughter of Sir William Pooley, of Boxted, Suffolk, by whom he had several daughters and three sons, Charles (born 1619), Richard (1621–1644) and Baptist (1628–1698).

In 1660, after the English Civil War, Judith petitioned King Charles II for a share of her late husband's proceeds from the Court of Star Chamber.

Parliament of England
Preceded by Sir Arthur Atye; Sir Richard Strode	Member of Parliament for Bere Alston; 1605–1611; With: Sir Richard Strode	Succeeded by Thomas Crewe; Sir Richard White
Preceded by Sir Thomas Knyvett; Sir Walter Cope	Member of Parliament for Westminster; 1614; With: Edmund Doubleday	Succeeded by Sir Edward Villiers; Edmund Doubleday
Preceded by Thomas Fanshawe; William Fanshawe	Member of Parliament for Lancaster; 1621–1624; With: Thomas Fanshawe	Succeeded by John Selden; Thomas Fanshawe
Preceded by Sir Richard Moryson; Sir William Herrick	Member of Parliament for Leicester; 1624–1625; With: William Ive 1624; Thomas Jermyn 1625	Succeeded by Thomas Jermyn; Sir George Hastings
Preceded by John Selden; Thomas Fanshawe	Member of Parliament for Lancaster; 1625; With: Sir Thomas Fanshawe	Succeeded by Sir Thomas Fanshawe; Thomas Jermyn
Preceded by Thomas Jermyn; Sir George Hastings	Member of Parliament for Leicester; 1626–1629; With: Sir George Hastings 1626; Sir John Stanhope	Parliament suspended until 1640
