= George Carpenter, 1st Baron Carpenter =

Lieutenant-General The Right Honourable The Lord Carpenter
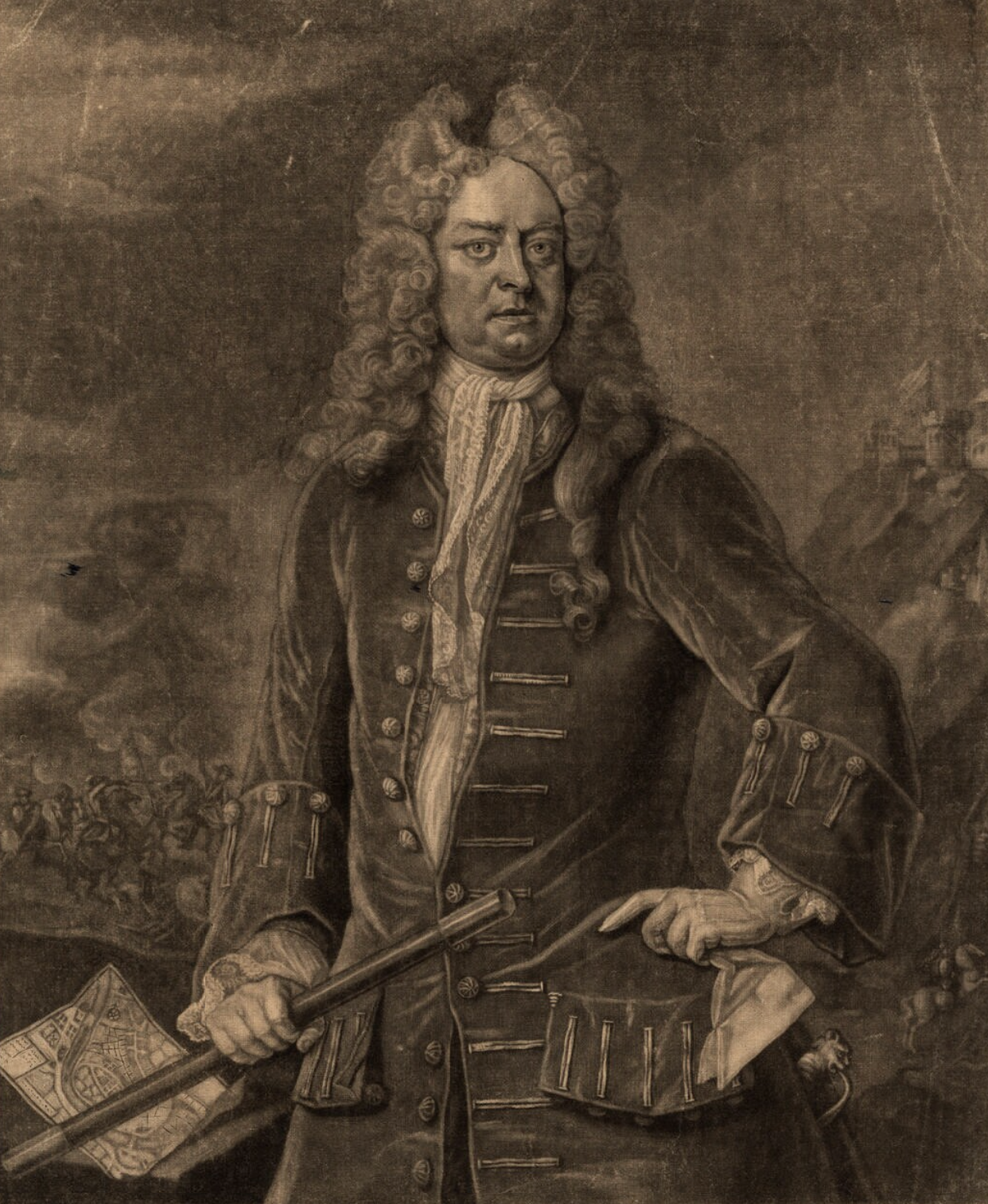
- Engraving by John Faber the Younger after a Johan van Diest portrait, c. 1719

Member of Parliament for Westminster
- In office 1722–1727

Governor of Menorca
- In office 1716–1718

Commander-in-Chief, Scotland
- In office 1716–1724

Member of Parliament for Whitchurch
- In office 1715–1722

Member of Parliament for Newtownards (Parliament of Ireland)
- In office 1703–1705

Personal details
- Born: 10 February 1657 Ocle Pychard, Herefordshire, England
- Died: 10 February 1731 (aged 74) Longwood House, Hampshire, England
- Resting place: Owslebury
- Party: Whig
- Spouse: Alice Margetson (1693–1731 †)
- Children: George (1697–1749); Alicia (1705–1714?)
- Occupation: Soldier and politician

Military service
- Allegiance: England; Great Britain
- Branch/service: English Army; British Army
- Years of service: 1673–1722
- Rank: Lieutenant-General
- Unit: 3rd The King's Own Hussars
- Battles/wars: Williamite War in Ireland; The Boyne; Aughrim; Nine Years' War; War of the Spanish Succession; Almansa; Almenar; Brihuega; Jacobite rising of 1715; Preston

Lieutenant-General George Carpenter, 1st Baron Carpenter (10 February 1657 – 10 February 1731) was a British army officer and Whig politician. He served as Commander-in-Chief, Scotland from 1716 to 1724 and as a member of parliament from 1715 to 1727. Commissioned into the English Army in 1685, Carpenter served in the Williamite War in Ireland, before being transferred to Flanders in 1692 for service in the Nine Years' War. A talented cavalry officer, he held senior positions in the Grand Alliance expeditionary force which fought in the Iberian Peninsula during the War of the Spanish Succession. Wounded several times, he was captured at the Battle of Brihuega in 1710, then later exchanged in a prisoner exchange.

In the 1715 British general election, he was elected to Parliament as a Whig MP for Whitchurch; although nominated as British envoy to Charles VI, Holy Roman Emperor, the appointment was cancelled when the Jacobite rising of 1715 began, and as commander of government forces in Northern England, he played a major role in ending the rebellion in England. In 1719, he was raised to the peerage of Ireland; as holder of an Irish peerage, he remained an MP and in December 1722 was elected for Westminster, retaining the seat until he retired in 1727. He died in February 1732, four months after his wife Alice and was succeeded by their only son, George Carpenter, 2nd Baron Carpenter.

== Personal details ==
George Carpenter was born on 10 February 1657 in Ocle Pychard, Herefordshire, the youngest of seven children. His parents were Warncombe and Eleanor Carpenter, whose family had owned property in the county for over 400 years, the main estate being Homme near Dilwyn.

In January 1694, Carpenter married Alice Margetson (1660–1731), daughter of the Irish peer William Caulfeild, Viscount Charlemont and wealthy widow of John Margetson, who died at the first Siege of Limerick in 1690. They had a son, George Carpenter, 2nd Baron Carpenter (1697–1749).

== Career; 1671 to 1714 ==
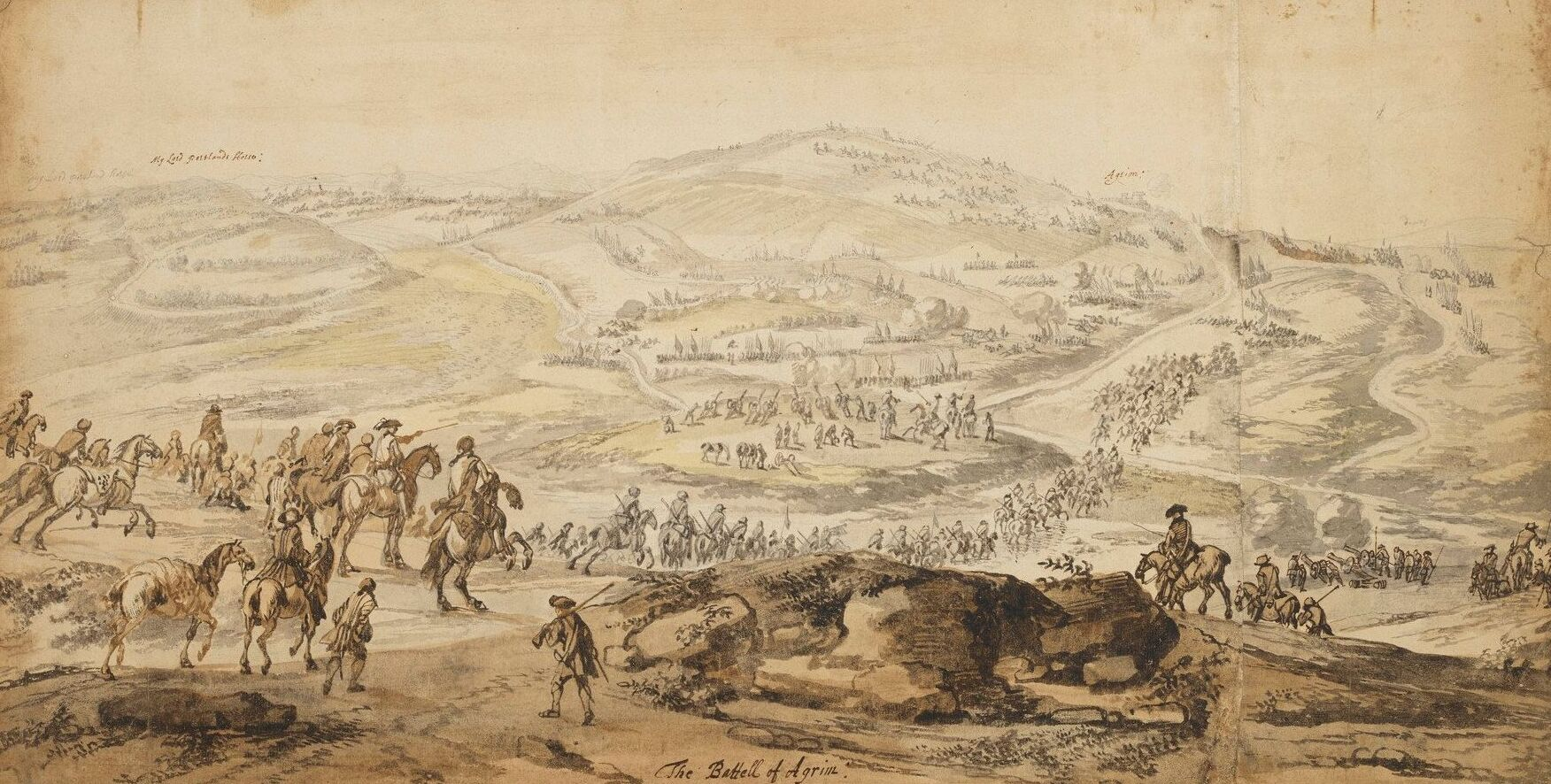
The 1691 battle of Aughrim; Carpenter's unit took part in the decisive charge against the Jacobite left.

In 1671, Carpenter was appointed page to Ralph Montagu, Charles II's envoy to Louis XIV of France; he returned home the next year, reportedly enlisting as a private in the Royal Horse Guards. There are few confirmed details of his career until 1685, when the accession of the Catholic James II of England led to the Monmouth Rebellion, and he was appointed quartermaster of an independent cavalry troop raised by the Earl of Manchester to help suppress it. In 1687, this troop was incorporated into Peterborough's Regiment of Horse and Carpenter received a commission as cornet.

When James was deposed by William III in the November 1688 Glorious Revolution, Carpenter's unit served in the 1689 to 1691 Williamite War in Ireland, fighting at the Boyne in 1690 and Aughrim in 1691. At Aughrim, it was ordered to cross a bog under heavy fire, prompting the Marquis de St Ruth, who was the opposing general, to shout "It is madness, but no matter, the more that cross, the more we shall kill;" he was decapitated by a cannonball shortly thereafter.

The war in Ireland ended with the October 1691 Treaty of Limerick and the regiment was sent to Flanders, where it spent the rest of the Nine Years' War; Carpenter was promoted lieutenant-colonel in January 1692. After the 1697 Treaty of Ryswick, his regiment returned to Ireland as part of the garrison; in 1703, Carpenter used his wife's dowry to buy lands in County Kilkenny and became MP for Newtownards in the Parliament of Ireland. He also purchased colonelcy of the 3rd The King's Own Hussars for 1,800 guineas, a position he held until his death in 1732.

During the War of the Spanish Succession in 1704, Carpenter was appointed quartermaster and general of cavalry in the expeditionary force led by the Earl of Peterborough, which was sent to Spain to support the Habsburg candidate, Archduke Charles. In March 1707, Peterborough was recalled to England and replaced by the Earl of Galway, who suffered a serious defeat by Bourbon-Spanish forces at Almansa in April. Most of the Allied infantry was captured, but despite being wounded, Carpenter's repeated cavalry charges saved the guns and baggage train.

James Stanhope took control of the British campaign in Spain; Carpenter participated in the victory at Almenara in 1710 but a few months later was captured along with Stanhope and Charles Wills at Brihuega. He was exchanged a few months later but did not see active service again before the war ended with the Treaty of Utrecht in 1714. At Brihuega, he was hit in the mouth by a musket ball which knocked out his teeth and remained lodged in his throat for nearly a year before being removed.

== Career; post-1714 ==
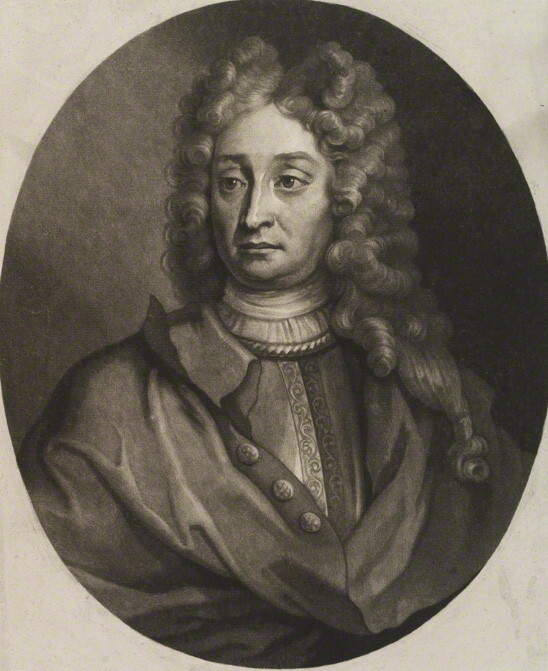
Engraving of Charles Wills

When George I succeeded Queen Anne in 1714, Carpenter was nominated Envoy to Charles VI, Holy Roman Emperor, but the Jacobite rising of 1715 began before he was able to take up this position. Given command of government forces in Northern England, he prevented the Jacobites from seizing Newcastle, forcing them south to Preston, where they were attacked on 13 November by troops under Charles Wills. The next day, he was joined by Carpenter and with no possibility of escape, the Jacobites surrendered.

Carpenter and Wills had allegedly previously clashed in Spain; despite being the senior officer, Carpenter felt Wills had taken most of the credit for this victory, while his role had been ignored. The two nearly came to blows, before the matter was smoothed over by Marlborough; Carpenter was rewarded with an appointment as Commander-in-chief, Scotland, a position he retained until 1724, and non-resident Governor of Menorca from 1716 to 1718. At the 1715 British general election, he was elected MP for Whitchurch, a Whig-controlled seat near his home of Longwood House, Hampshire.

On 29 May 1719, he was created 'Baron Carpenter of Killaghy'; since this was an Irish peerage, it did not prevent him from remaining an MP. He was returned for Westminster at a by-election called after the 1722 British general election result was declared void. With over 8,000 voters, Westminster was second only in number of electors to York and thus one of the most important constituencies in Parliament. The previous election was won by two Tories who were backed by Bishop Francis Atterbury, a Jacobite sympathiser and alleged leader of the Atterbury Plot; Carpenter's selection as government candidate showed his perceived reliability and appeal.

Carpenter retired from politics at the 1727 election; he died on 10 February 1732, four months after his wife, and was buried at St Andrew's church, Owslebury in Hampshire.

== Carpenter Coat of arms ==
The coat of arms chosen by Carpenter when created a baron is described as follows: "Paly of six, argent and gules, on a chevron azure, 3 cross crosslets or." Crest, on a wreath a globe in a frame all or. Supporters, two horses, party-perfess, embattled argent and gules. Motto: "Per Acuta Belli" (Through the Asperities of War).

== Sources ==
- Carpenter, Lord George (1737). "An Account of the Wound, Which the Late Lord Carpenter Received at Brihuega; Whereby a Bullet Remained Near His Gullet for a Year Wanting a Few Days; Communicated to the Royal Society by His Son the Right Honourable George Lord Carpenter, F. R. S. &c". Philosophical Transactions of the Royal Society of London. 40: 316. Bibcode:1737RSPT...40..316C.
- Cruickshanks, Eveline (1970). Westminster in The History of Parliament: the House of Commons 1715-1754. Boydell & Brewer.
- Dalton, Charles (1894). English army lists and commission registers, 1661-1714, Volume II 1685-1689. Eyre & Spottiswoode.
- Dalton, Charles (1896). English army lists and commission registers, 1661-1714, Volume III 1689-1694. Eyre & Spottiswoode.
- Dalton, Charles (1904). English army lists and commission registers, 1661-1714, Volume VI 1707-1714. Eyre & Spottiswoode.
- Historic England. "Church of St Andrew (1095925)". National Heritage List for England.
- Laird, Ian. "Longwood House". Lost Heritage.
- Lenman, Bruce (1980). The Jacobite Risings in Britain, 1689-1746. Methuen. ISBN 0413396509.
- Richards, Walter (1890). Her Majesty's Army, Volume I. Virtue & Co.
- Rubio Campillo, Xavier (2010). God save Catalonia! England's intervention in Catalonia during the War of the Spanish Succession (PDF). Grup de Recerca de la Universitat de Barcelona.
- Stephens, HM (2004). "Carpenter, George, first Baron Carpenter of Killaghy". Oxford Dictionary of National Biography (online ed.). Oxford University Press. doi:10.1093/ref:odnb/4726. (Subscription, Wikipedia Library access or UK public library membership required.)
- Watkins, C; Cowell, Ben (2015). Uvedale Price (1747-1829): Decoding the Picturesque. Boydell Press. ISBN 978-1783270231.
- Watson, Paula (1970). CARPENTER, George (1657-1732), of Longwood House, Hants in The History of Parliament: the House of Commons 1715-1754. Boydell & Brewer.

Parliament of Great Britain
Preceded by Frederick Tylney; Thomas Vernon	Member of Parliament for Whitchurch; 1715–1722; With: Thomas Vernon 1715–1721; Frederick Tylney 1721; John Conduitt 1721–1722	Succeeded by John Conduitt; Thomas Vernon
Preceded by Archibald Hutcheson; John Cotton	Member of Parliament for Westminster; 1722–1727; With: Charles Montagu	Succeeded by Lord Charles Cavendish; William Clayton
Peerage of Ireland
New creation	Baron Carpenter; 1719–1731	Succeeded by George Carpenter
Military offices
Preceded by John Campbell, 2nd Duke of Argyll	Commander-in-Chief, Scotland; 1716–1724	Succeeded by George Wade
Preceded by John Campbell, 2nd Duke of Argyll	Governor of Menorca; 1714–1732	Succeeded by Richard Kane
