= Peter Warren (Royal Navy officer) =

Royal Navy officer and politician (1703–1752)

Vice-Admiral Sir Peter Warren KB
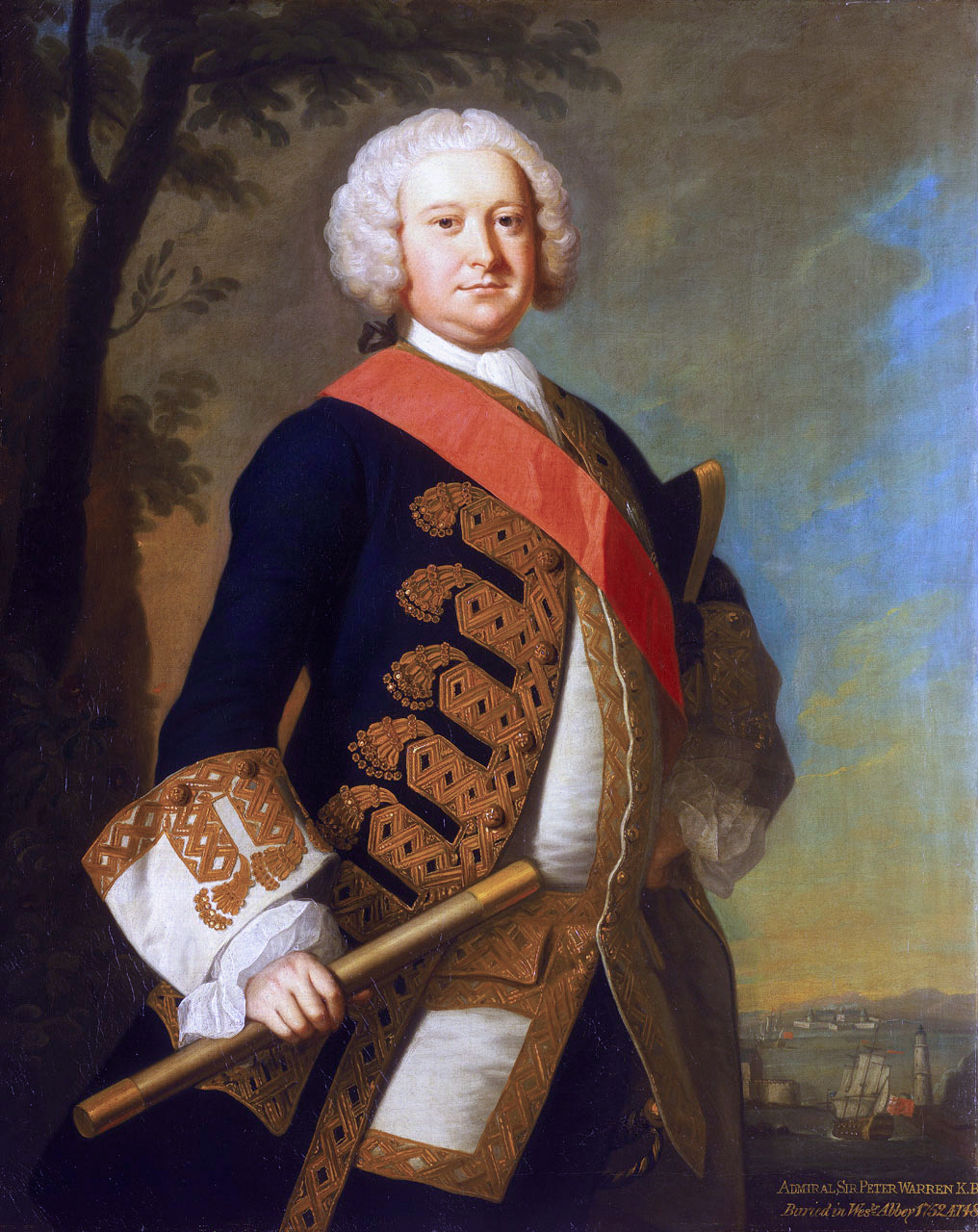
- Portrait by Thomas Hudson, 1748–1752

Member of Parliament for Westminster
- In office 1747–1752
- Preceded by: Charles Edwin; Viscount Perceval
- Succeeded by: Edward Cornwallis; Viscount Trentham

Personal details
- Born: c. 1703 Warrenstown, Ireland
- Died: 29 July 1751 (aged 47–48) Dublin, Ireland
- Spouse(s): Susannah Delancey (m. 1731)
- Children: 6, including Anne

Military service
- Allegiance: Great Britain
- Branch/service: Royal Navy
- Years of service: 1716–1752
- Rank: Vice-Admiral of the Red
- Commands: HMS Falkland; HMS Grafton; HMS Solebay; HMS Leopard; HMS Squirrel; HMS Devonshire
- Battles/wars: War of Jenkins' Ear; Siege of St. Augustine; Battle of Cartagena de Indias; War of the Austrian Succession; Siege of Louisbourg; First Battle of Cape Finisterre
- Awards: Knight Companion of the Order of the Bath

Vice-Admiral of the Red Sir Peter Warren, KB (10 March 1703 – 29 July 1752) was a Royal Navy officer and politician who represented Westminster in the House of Commons of Great Britain from 1747 to 1752. Warren is best known for his career in the British navy, in which he served for thirty-six years, participating in numerous naval engagements, most notably the capture of the French fortress of Louisbourg in 1745.

Born in Ireland c. 1703 to an Irish Catholic family, Warren's parents raised him as a Protestant in order to allow him to pursue a career at sea. In 1716, Warren enlisted in the Royal Navy, largely spending the next decade serving off the West African coast or in the Caribbean, participating in anti-piracy operations and confrontations with Spanish coast guard vessels. Eleven years later in 1727, Warren was promoted to the rank of post-captain.

From 1728 to 1745, Warren served almost continuously in the Americas. He commanded the Solebay off New York, where he married Susannah Delancey in 1731; they had six children together. During the War of Jenkins' Ear, he participated in failed attacks on St. Augustine and Cartagena. In 1745, Warren joined an expeditionary force to attack the fortress of Louisbourg, leading a blockade which led to the garrison capitulating on 28 June.

Warren participated in the First Battle of Cape Finisterre in May 1747, being made a Knight Companion, before returning to England to pursue a political career. He was elected to Parliament in the 1747 general election, attending several parliamentary committees in addition to opposing a clause in the 1749 Consolidation Act. Warren died in Dublin on 29 July 1752. The towns of Warren, Rhode Island and Warren, New Hampshire were named for him.

== Early life ==
Warren was born c. 1703 in Warrenstown, Ireland, the youngest son of Michael Warren, an Irish Army officer and his wife Catherine Aylmer, the only daughter of Sir Christopher Aylmer, 1st Baronet. As Ireland's penal laws prevented Catholics from enlisting in the Royal Navy, his Irish Catholics parents raised him as a Protestant in order to allow him to pursue a career at sea.

In 1716, Warren followed in the footsteps of his brother Oliver and enlisted in the Royal Navy, serving on board the Rye at the rank of ordinary seaman under the patronage of his maternal uncle Matthew Aylmer. After a brief stint in Irish waters, Warren spent roughly the next decade serving off the West African coast and the Caribbean Sea, where he participated in anti-piracy operations and confrontations with Spanish coast guard vessels.

On 23 July, Warren was promoted to the rank of lieutenant while serving on board the Guernsey off the Liberian coast to replace a fellow naval officer. Three years later, he was placed in command of the Falkland when her previous captain died. In 1727, Warren was promoted to commander on 28 May before being promoted to post-captain on 19 June, and was given command over the Grafton in 1728, serving as part of the Baltic Fleet.

== Career in the Americas ==
Warren spent only a short time in the Baltic before joining the Mediterranean Fleet. There he was given command of the Solebay, and used it to deliver news of the Treaty of El Pardo to Jamaica and Veracruz in 1728. From 1730 to 1732, he commanded the Solebay in North America, operating off the coasts of New York and South Carolina. In 1734, Warren started serving in the Western Squadron, commanding the Leopard until 1735.

By the next year, Warren was serving in New York again and was made captain of the Squirrel, holding that command until 1741. After the War of Jenkins' Ear broke out, Warren participated in a failed attempt to capture St. Augustine in 1740. After the battle, he sailed for Jamaica to serve under Edward Vernon in a failed British expedition against Cartagena on 1741; by January 1742, he was commanding the Superb, again in New York.

On 1742, Warren suggested to the British Admiralty that a new squadron be formed from ships serving in North America to serve in the West Indies during the winter season. The Admiralty accepted his suggestion in August of that year, and appointed him as the commander of the new squadron, which operated off the Leeward Islands and distinguished itself by capturing numerous French prizes during the War of the Austrian Succession.

In 1745, Warren participated in an expedition against the French fortress of Louisbourg. Warren led his squadron to Canso in April 1745, where he joined forces with a British expeditionary force and proceeded towards Louisbourg, instituting a blockade of the fortress harbour. His fleet captured the Vigilant on 20 May and soon received reinforcements, which combined with a planned British assault led to the fortress surrendering on 28 June.

Warren received praise in Britain for his role in the capture, and was promoted to the rank of rear-admiral on 10 August 1745. He was also appointed as the first governor of Cape Breton Island, though Warren pleaded with to the Admiralty to find a replacement as he was attempting to secure the governorship of New York from George Clinton. Being relieved of the position in June 1746, Warren eventually returned to England after planning for an invasion of New France with Governor William Shirley which ultimately came to nothing.

== Later life and death ==
Upon arriving in England, Warren presented the Admiralty with a new scheme for an invasion of New France which he had planned out with Shirley. However, the Admiralty responded they could not undertake the scheme and have enough ships to maintain the ongoing British blockade of French ports; instead, they ordered Warren to lead an eight-ship squadron to reinforce the occupation of Louisbourg. However, they soon ordered him to take his flagship Devonshire and join a fleet under George Anson in the Bay of Biscay, which was cruising in the area for French warships.

In May 1747, Warren was part of the British fleet which encountered a French force under the command of the Marquis de la Jonquière off Cape Finisterre and defeated it. Warren was made a Knight of the Bath and given £31,496 in prize money as a reward for his actions. On June of that year, he was promoted to the rank of vice-admiral and given command of the Western Squadron, handing it over to Edward Hawke in August due to an illness. In 1748, the Treaty of Aix-la-Chapelle was signed, which put an end to the ongoing conflict.

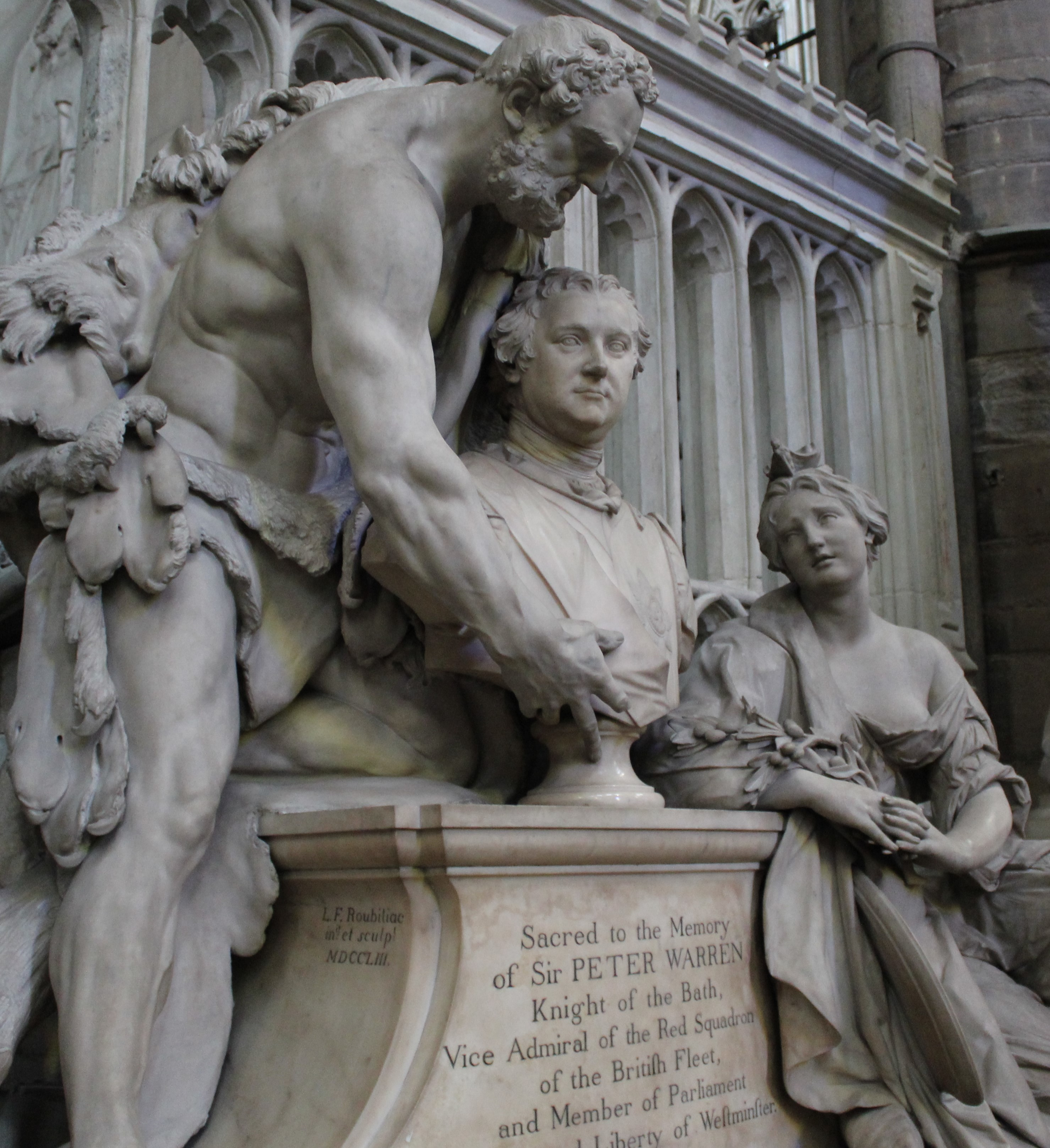
Warren's monument in Westminster Abbey

Warren then turned his attention towards political affairs, having been elected to the House of Commons in the 1747 British general election representing the constituency of Westminster. In Parliament, Warren alienated some of his supporters by opposing a clause in the 1749 Consolidation Act being put forth by Anson which stipulated that naval officers on half-pay would be subject to courts-martial on the same terms as serving officers. Warren convinced the Admiralty to remove the clause, though this led to his relationship with Anson to become irrevocably hostile.

In addition to naval affairs, Warren was also active in attending parliamentary committees, chairing several and delivering numerous proposed bills to the House of Lords himself. He also advocated for a stronger Royal Navy and alliances with other European nations to counter French ambitions, and involved himself in discussions concerning British currency and overseas trade, fishing and boundary issues in Britain's colonial empire. In 1747, Warren proposed new uniforms for the Royal Navy, specifically those worn by flag officers such as admiral and captains.

As his political career led him settling down in London, Warren purchased a home at 15 Cavendish Square. In 1752, he was elected against his wishes to the Court of Aldermen from the ward of Billingsgate; on 23 June, Warren sent a letter to the court requesting to be excused from serving his duties in exchange for paying a small fine, which was accepted. While on a visit to Dublin, Warren died at the age of 47-48 of a fever on 29 July 1752 and was buried in Warrenstown. After his death, Louis-François Roubiliac was commissioned to sculpt a monument to Warren in Westminster Abbey.

== Personal life, family and legacy ==
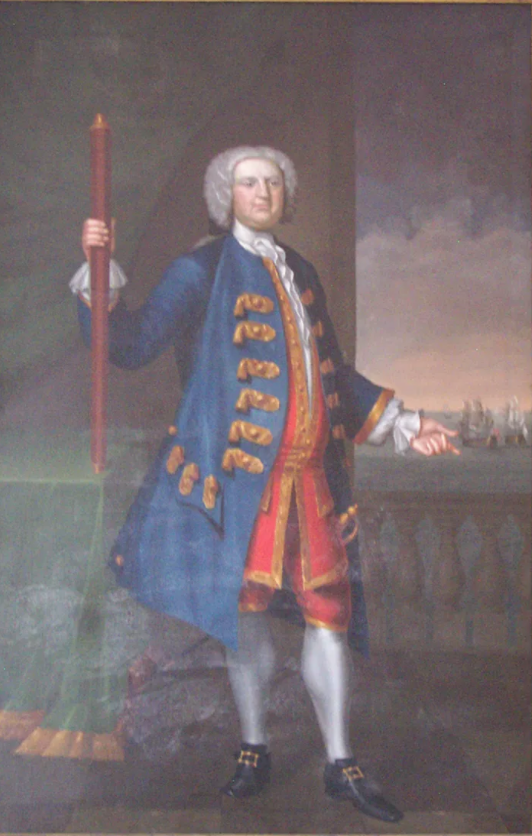
A portrait of Warren by John Smibert made c. 1745

During his military career, Warren amassed over £127,405 in prize money, primarily from capturing French and Spanish ships during the War of the Austrian Succession. He spent his fortune on purchasing large amounts of land in both Britain and the Thirteen Colonies and running a moneylending business which operated in England, Ireland and North America. Warren also made money by transporting bullion owned by the South Sea Company while commanding the Falkland in 1726.

Warren owned lands in Hampshire, England, New York and Pennsylvania. In 1732, he invited his nephew William Johnson to manage his estates in the Mohawk Valley region, charging him with clearing the land and settling European tenant labourers, in addition to establishing trading relationships with local indigenous American tribes. On his American estates, Warren owned a number of slaves, purchasing over twenty enslaved labourers to work under Johnson in 1744.

In July 1731, Warren married Susannah Delancey, the daughter of Stephen Delancey; the couple would go on to have six children. His only son (along with a daughter) died in a smallpox epidemic in 1744, and when Warren was offered a baronetcy in the next year, he declined the offer as he no longer had a son to inherit it. Warren's eldest daughter Anne married Charles FitzRoy on 27 July 1758, while his third daughter Charlotte married Lord Abingdon on 7 July 1768.

During and after his life, numerous locations in both England and North America were named after Warren. The towns of Warren, Rhode Island, and Warren, New Hampshire, were named after him, as were several streets in Charleston, South Carolina, London, Louisbourg and New York City. In addition, Warren's involvement in the capture of Louisbourg has been credited as helping to inspire significant interest among the British public for the first time in North American affairs.

Parliament of Great Britain
Preceded by Charles Edwin; Viscount Perceval	Member of Parliament for Westminster; 1747–1752; With: Viscount Trentham	Succeeded by Edward Cornwallis; Viscount Trentham
