= Thomas Fanshawe =

English government official and politician

Sir Thomas Fanshawe KB (1580 – 17 December 1631) was an English government official and politician who sat in the House of Commons between 1601 and 1629.

== Biography ==
Fanshawe was the second son of Thomas Fanshawe and first son by his second wife Joan Smythe, daughter of Customer Smythe and was baptised on 15 September 1580. His father was Queen's Remembrancer of the Exchequer. He was educated at Queens' College, Cambridge and admitted at the Inner Temple in 1595. He was an auditor for the Duchy of Lancaster. In 1601, he inherited the estate of Jenkins and Barking Manor, Essex, on the death of his father.

Also in 1601 Fanshawe was elected Member of Parliament for Bedford. He was elected MP for Lancaster in 1604. In 1606 became a barrister. He was re-elected MP for Lancaster in 1614 and 1621. He was knighted by King James in 1624. He was reelected MP for Lancaster in 1624, 1625, 1626 and 1628 and sat until 1629 when King Charles decided to rule without parliament for eleven years.

Fanshawe married Anne Babington, daughter of Urias Babington and had three sons, of which only one, Thomas, survived him. He was half-brother of Sir Henry Fanshawe, grandfather of Thomas Fanshawe, 2nd Viscount Fanshawe.

Parliament of England
| Preceded by Humphrey Winch; Oliver Luke | Member of Parliament for Bedford; 1601; With: Humphrey Winch | Succeeded by Sir Humphrey Winch; Thomas Hawes |
| Preceded by Sir Jerome Bowes; Sir Carew Reynell | Member of Parliament for Lancaster; 1604–1629; With: Sir Thomas Hesketh 1604–1605; Sir Thomas Howard 1605–1611; William Fanshawe 1614; Sir Humphrey May 1621–1624; John Selden 1624; Sir Humphrey May 1625; Thomas Jermyn 1626; Francis Bindlosse 1628–1629 | Parliament suspended until 1640 |
