= Charles Edwin (died 1756) =

Welsh politician

Charles Edwin (c. 1699 – 29 June 1756) was a Welsh politician who sat in the House of Commons from 1741 to 1756.

== Early life ==
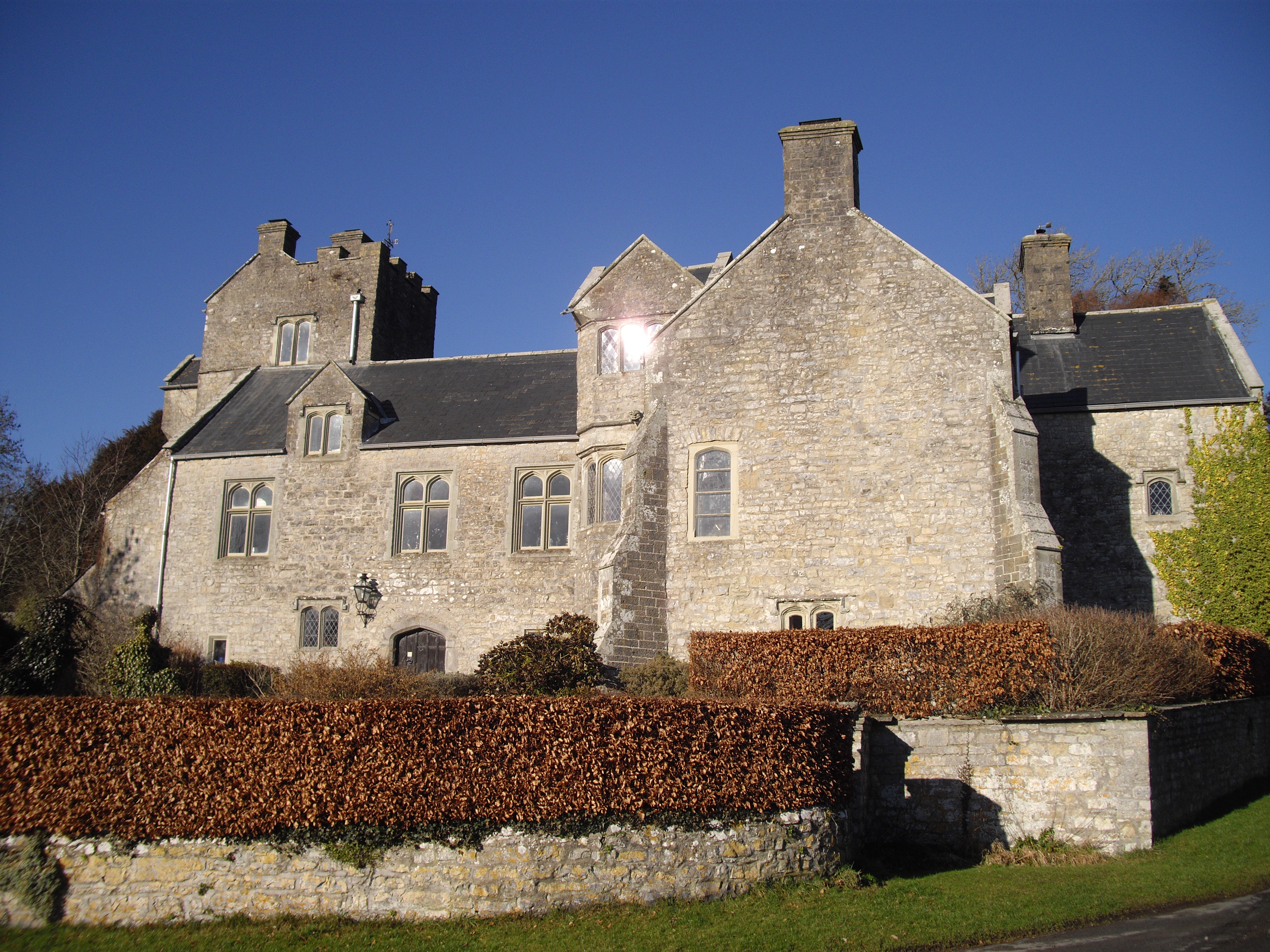
Llanmihangel Place

Edwin was the eldest son of Samuel Edwin, MP, of Llanmihangel Plas, Glamorgan, and grandson of Sir Humphrey Edwin, who was Lord Mayor of London in 1698. His mother was Lady Catherine Montagu, daughter of the 3rd Earl of Manchester. He succeeded his father in 1722 and in 1735 succeeded to the Surrey, Sussex and Northamptonshire estates of his uncle Thomas Edwin. On 1 May 1736, Edwin married Lady Charlotte Hamilton (1707–1777), daughter of the 4th Duke of Hamilton.

== Career ==
Edwin was selected Sheriff of Northamptonshire from 1739 to 1740. He turned up by chance at a meeting to nominate Admiral Vernon as candidate for Westminster at the forthcoming 1741 general election and found himself put forward as the Admiral's running-mate. At the election, the High Bailiff arbitrarily closed the poll early and brought in soldiers for protection when he declared the Government candidates elected. A committee of independent electors including gentry and lawyers was formed to challenge the result. Parliament declared the election void on the grounds of the presence of soldiers, and the bailiff was found to have been given secret funds and ordered to be imprisoned. The Government could field no candidates at the rerun of the election and Edwin was returned unopposed as Member of Parliament (MP) for Westminster on 31 December 1741. At the 1747 Edwin was returned unopposed as MP for Glamorgan. He was returned again unopposed at the 1754 general election.

== Death and legacy ==
Edwin died without issue on 29 June 1756. He left Llanmihangel Plas to his sister Ann, who had married Thomas Wyndham. Their son Charles Wyndham changed his name to Edwin on inheriting the estates on the death of his mother.

Parliament of Great Britain
Preceded by William Clayton; Sir Charles Wager	Member of Parliament for Westminster; 1741 – 1747; With: Viscount Perceval	Succeeded by Viscount Trentham; Peter Warren
Preceded by Thomas Mathews	Member of Parliament for Glamorgan; 1747 – 1756	Succeeded by Thomas William Mathews
