= John Cotton (1671–1736) =

British Tory politician

John Cotton (October 1671 – December 1736) was a British Tory politician.

Cotton was born in Norfolk, the second son of John Cotton and Ann Wright. He was the nephew of Sir Robert Wright. In 1705 he was appointed clerk to the Worshipful Company of Cutlers. Through a personal connection to James Butler, 2nd Duke of Ormonde, Cotton was appointed deputy high steward of Westminster and presided over the Westminster Court of Burgesses.

At the 1722 British general election, Cotton was elected as a Tory member of parliament for Westminster owing to the support of Francis Atterbury, whom he advised on financial matters. In December 1722, Cotton was unseated on petition. He stood in the ensuing by-election, but was defeated in the face of strong Whig opposition. He died in December 1736.

Parliament of England
Preceded by Sir Thomas Crosse, Bt; Edward Wortley Montagu	Member of Parliament for Westminster with Archibald Hutcheson; 1722	Succeeded by Charles Montagu; George Carpenter
