= Charles Montagu (of Papplewick) =

British landowner and politician

Member of Parliament for Northampton
- In office 1754-1759

Member of Parliament for Camelford
- In office 1741-1747

Member of Parliament for St Germans
- In office 1734-1741

Member of Parliament for Westminster
- In office 1722-1727

Personal details
- Died: 1759
- Spouse: Ann Colladon
- Children: 3, including Frederick
- Parent: James Montagu (father)

Charles Montagu (died 1759), of Papplewick, Nottinghamshire. was a British landowner and politician who sat in the House of Commons between 1722 and 1759.

== Early life ==
Montagu was the only son of Sir James Montagu, MP and judge, and his first wife Tufton Wray, daughter of Sir William Wray, 1st Baronet, of Ashby, Lincolnshire. He was admitted at Lincoln's Inn on 9 June 1712. In 1723 he succeeded to the estates of his father. He married after a settlement dated 10 April 1725, Ann Colladon, daughter of Sir Theodore Colladon of Chelsea, and sub-governess to the Princesses.

== Career ==
Montagu was returned as Member of Parliament for Westminster in 1722 as a government supporter. He did not stand in 1727. At the 1734 general election, Richard Eliot brought him in as MP for St Germans. He became a supporter of Frederick, Prince of Wales, who appointed him Auditor general of the Duchy of Cornwall in 1735, and auditor of the household to Prince of Wales in 1738. He did not vote on the Spanish convention in 1739 or the place bill in 1740, and withdrew on a motion to remove Walpole in February 1741. At the 1741 general election, he was returned as MP for Camelford by Thomas Pitt who acted as the Prince's election manager. Montagu always voted with the Prince's party. At the 1747 general election, called by the King to challenge the Prince's opposition, Pitt tried to put Montagu up for Okehampton, but his initial hopes of success were thwarted by strong opposition there.

The Prince of Wales died in 1751 and Montagu lost both of the posts in his service. He was appointed instead auditor to the household of the Princess. At the 1754 general election he was returned unopposed as MP for Northampton on the interest of his cousin, George Montagu-Dunk, 2nd Earl of Halifax. Although considered to be a supporter of the Administration after 1754, he voted against the Address on 13 November 1755.

== Death and legacy ==
Montagu died on 29 May 1759. He had two sons and a daughter. His widow became well known in society and was an intimate friend of Mary, dowager-countess of Gower (the widow of John Leveson-Gower, 1st Earl Gower), and of Mary Delany, in whose published 'Correspondence' she frequently figures as 'my Mrs Montague', in order to distinguish her from the better known Elizabeth Montagu. Her London residence was in Hanover Square and she died on 31 May 1780. Their son Frederick succeeded to Papplewick and built Papplewick Hall in around 1787.

Parliament of Great Britain
| Preceded by Archibald Hutcheson; John Cotton | Member of Parliament for Westminster; 1722–1727; With: George Carpenter | Succeeded by Charles Cavendish; William Clayton |
| Preceded by Dudley Ryder; Richard Eliot | Member of Parliament for St Germans; 1734–1741; With: The Lord Baltimore | Succeeded by John Hynde Cotton; James Newsham |
| Preceded by Sir Thomas Lyttelton; James Cholmondeley | Member of Parliament for Camelford; 1741–1747; With: The Earl of Inchiquin | Succeeded by The Earl of Londonderry; Samuel Martin |
| Preceded by Hon. George Compton; George Montagu | Member of Parliament for Northampton; 1754–1759; With: Hon. George Compton; Hon. Charles Compton; Richard Backwell | Succeeded by Richard Backwell; Frederick Montagu |
