= 1877 Westminster by-election =

UK Parliamentary by-election

The 1877 Westminster by-election was fought on 11 August 1877. The by-election was fought due to the incumbent Conservative MP, William Henry Smith, becoming first Lord of the Admiralty. It was retained by the incumbent.
