= Edmund Doubleday =

Edmund Doubleday (died December 1620) was an English vintner, lawyer, office-holder and politician who sat in the House of Commons in 1614. He was jointly responsible for the capture of Guy Fawkes in the Gunpowder Plot.

Doubleday was acting as a scrivener and public notary by 1587 and then studied law at Middle Temple. He was active at the parish of St Margaret's, Westminster where he signed parish accounts from 1590. He was overseer of the poor in 1590. By the 1590s he had acquired leases of several properties from Westminster Abbey and marriages to wealthy widows brought him various property in Westminster which included the Saracens Head on King Street. In 1591 he was assigned half the lease of Ebury Manor by Thomas Knyvet with whom he was subsequently involved in various activities. From 1592 to 1595 he was High Constable of Westminster. Doubleday was built for law enforcement, being described in Anglorum Speculumas as "a man of great stature, valour, gravity and activity". He was given a position in the mint office in 1601. In 1604 Doubleday and Andrew Bright were granted the offices of distilling herbs and sweet waters at the palace of Whitehall and keeping the library there.

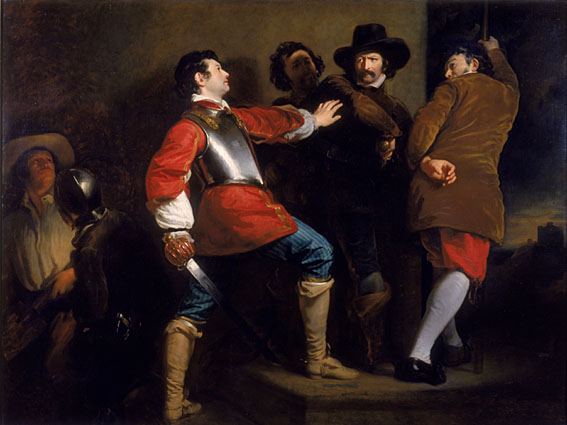
The Discovery of the Gunpowder Plot by Henry Perronet Briggs, 1823. Sir Thomas Knyvet and Doubleday arresting Guy Fawkes who was discovered guarding barrels of gunpowder in the undercroft beneath the House of Lords shortly after midnight on 5 November 1605.

On 5 November 1605 Doubleday assisted Knyvet in a search of the undercroft of the Palace of Westminster where they discovered Guy Fawkes. Fawkes gripped Doubleday "very violently" by the fingers of the left hand. Doubleday in reaction was about to stab Fawkes but thought better of it. Instead he tripped Fawkes, searched him and tied him up with garters found in Fawkes's pockets.

Doubleday went to Scotland as a royal commissioner to investigate the controversial new silver mine at Hilderston in January 1608. In 1609 Doubleday and Knyvett were given a grant of "keeping plate and money in the tower and the coinage of money there and elsewhere for life" In 1611 they were given the joint title of Warden of the Mint. Meanwhile, he had joined the Worshipful Company of Vintners in 1610 of which he became one of the wealthiest members.

Doubleday was involved in further law enforcement on Christmas Day 1611 at the chapel in Whitehall when King James and his family were at prayer. One John Selman went into the chapel and Doubleday spotted him as suspicious and kept a watch on him. Doubleday saw Selman picking the pocket of Leonard Barry and they gave chase. Once Selman was caught, Doubleday gripped him by both hands and Barry retrieved his purse. Selman was hanged in January.

In 1614, Doubleday was elected Member of Parliament for Westminster. He was master of the Vintners Company from 1616 to 1617. In December 1620 he was re-elected MP for Westminster, but died two days after the election. He asked to be buried near the vestry in St Margaret's Church.

Parliament of England
Preceded by Sir Thomas Knyvett; Sir Walter Cope	Member of Parliament for Westminster; 1614–1620; With: Sir Humphrey May 1614; Sir Edward Villiers 1620	Succeeded by Sir Edward Villiers; William Mann
