= William Mann (MP) =

English politician

William Mann was an English politician who sat in the House of Commons from 1621 to 1625.

Mann was a rent-collector for the Dean of Westminster and was in the pay of Westminster Abbey. He was a vestryman of St Margaret's, Westminster. Following the death of Edmund Doubleday in 1620, shortly after he was elected Member of Parliament for Westminster, the then dean of Westminster John Williams was the prime mover in arranging the by-election. In this, Williams promoted Mann as his candidate. The election was contentious but Mann was elected MP for Westminster in 1621. He was re-elected MP for Westminster in 1624 and 1625.

Parliament of England
Preceded by Sir Edward Villiers; Edmund Doubleday	Member of Parliament for Westminster; 1621–1625; With: Sir Edward Villiers	Succeeded by Sir Robert Pye; Peter Heywood
