= Richard Cecil (died 1633) =

English politician

Sir Richard Cecil (7 December 1570 – 4 September 1633) was an English politician who sat in the House of Commons at various times between 1593 and 1622.

Cecil was the second son of Thomas Cecil, 1st Earl of Exeter and his first wife Dorothy Nevill, the daughter of John Nevill, 4th Baron Latymer. He entered St John's College, Cambridge in 1585 and Gray's Inn in 1591. In 1593 he was elected Member of Parliament for Westminster. He travelled abroad in 1594. In 1604 he was elected MP for Peterborough. He was a J.P. for Northamptonshire by 1605 and was bailiff of the lordship and keeper of the manor and park of Collyweston, Northants in 1607. He was Deputy Lieutenant of Northamptonshire by 1613. In 1614 he was elected MP for Stamford. He was knighted in 1616. In 1621 he was re-elected MP for Stamford.

Cecil died in 1633 at the age of 62. He was buried in Wakerley, 4 September 1633.

Cecil married Elizabeth Cope, daughter of Sir Anthony Cope, 1st Baronet in 1603. His son David succeeded to the title of Earl of Exeter. He was the brother of Edward Cecil, 1st Viscount Wimbledon and William Cecil, 2nd Earl of Exeter.

Parliament of England
Preceded by Thomas Knyvett; Peter Osborne	Member of Parliament for Westminster; 1593; With: Thomas Cole	Succeeded by Thomas Knyvett; Thomas Cole
Preceded by Nicholas Tufton; Goddard Pemberton	Member of Parliament for Peterborough; 1604; With: Edward Wymarke	Succeeded by Sir William Walter; Roger Manwood
Preceded by Sir Robert Wingfield; Henry Hall	Member of Parliament for Stamford; 1614-1622; With: John Jay; John Wingfield	Succeeded by George Goring; John St Amand
