= Edward Villiers (Master of the Mint) =

English nobleman (c. 1585–1626)

Sir Edward Villiers
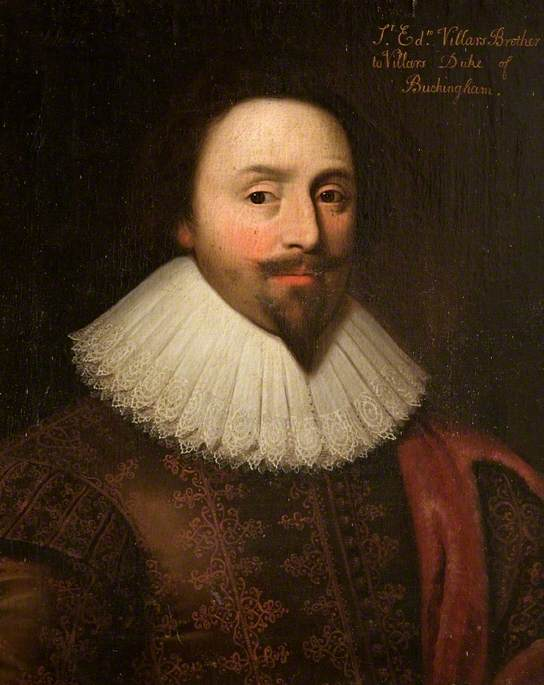
- Portrait of Sir Edward Villiers

Lord President of Munster
- In office October 1625 – September 1626

Warden of the Mint
- In office 1623–1626

Member of Parliament for Westminster
- In office 1621–1625

Master of the Mint
- In office 1619–1623

Personal details
- Born: 1585 Brooksby Hall, Leicestershire
- Died: 7 September, 1626 (aged 40–41) College of Youghal
- Resting place: Collegiate Church of St Mary Youghal, Ireland
- Spouse: Barbara St John (1612–his death)
- Children: William Villiers, 2nd Viscount Grandison; John Villiers, 3rd Viscount Grandison; George Villiers, 4th Viscount Grandison; Edward Villiers; Barbara Howard, Countess of Suffolk
- Parent(s): Sir George Villiers (1544–1606); Audrey Saunders (died 1587)
- Education: Queens' College, Cambridge

Sir Edward Villiers (c. 1585 – 7 September 1626) was an English nobleman from Leicestershire and member of the Villiers family, whose younger half-brother George Villiers, 1st Duke of Buckingham, was a favourite of both James VI and I and his son Charles. Through his influence, Sir Edward gained various positions, including Master of the Mint, Member of Parliament for Westminster and Lord President of Munster. He died in Ireland in September 1626.

== Family ==
Edward Villiers, born about 1585, was the second son of Sir George Villiers by his first wife, Audrey Saunders (d. 1587), the daughter and heir of William Saunders (d. 14 July 1582) of Harrington, Northamptonshire, by Frances Zouche, the daughter of William Zouche of Bulwick, Northamptonshire, son of John Zouche, 7th Baron Zouche (c. 1440–1527) of Harringworth, who fought for King Richard III at Bosworth Field.

He had an elder brother, Sir William Villiers (d. 12 June 1629), created a baronet in 1619, who married Rebecca Roper, daughter and co-heir of Robert Roper, esquire, by Elizabeth Nott, the daughter of William Nott, esquire, of Thames Ditton; and three sisters, Elizabeth Villiers (d. 1654), who married John Boteler, 1st Baron Boteler of Brantfield; Anne Villiers, who married Sir William Washington, brother of Lawrence Washington, ancestor of George Washington; and Frances Villiers, who died without issue.

By his father's second marriage he was a half-brother of King James I's favourite, George Villiers, 1st Duke of Buckingham; John Villiers, 1st Viscount Purbeck; Christopher Villiers, 1st Earl of Anglesey; and Susan Fielding (née Villiers), Countess of Denbigh who was Henrietta Maria's First Lady of the Bedchamber.

== Career ==
Villiers was knighted on 7 September 1616. In October 1617, he succeeded Sir Richard Martin as Master of the Mint (until 1623), and in November 1618 he became comptroller of the Court of Wards. From 1623 until his death he was Warden of the Mint.

On 30 December 1620 Villiers was elected as one of the members of parliament for Westminster. In the same month he was sent to Elector Frederick V of the Palatinate, to say that assistance would be given to him, but only on condition that he entered into an agreement to relinquish the crown of Bohemia. Villiers returned before May and took his seat in parliament, but was in that month temporarily excluded from the house for attempting to speak on the question of a patent, in which he was personally interested (the gold and silver patent in which Villiers had invested £4,000 in 1617, and from which he derived an income of £500 annually). His conduct was vindicated in the inquiry by the House of Lords in June, and Villiers was allowed to resume his seat in the Commons. In September he was again sent to the Elector Frederick, then serving with the Dutch army, to persuade him to withdraw from it and submit to the Holy Roman Emperor. On 23 September 1622, he was granted a lease of the customs and subsidies on gold and silver thread on condition of surrendering the mastership of the mint, but the latter office was restored to him in July 1624. He was re-elected as a member of parliament for Westminster on 22 January 1624 to sit in what became known as the Happy Parliament, and on 25 April 1625 to sit in the Useless Parliament. In August 1625 he asked the Commons to prevent a dissolution by desisting from its attack on his half-brother Buckingham.

Meanwhile, James I, in January 1625, appointed Villiers Lord President of Munster; the appointment was confirmed by King Charles I on 6 May, and in August Villiers went to Ireland to assume his duties. He held the post little over a year, and was absent for several months during that period.

Villiers died in the College of Youghal, which he made his official residence, on 7 September 1626; he was buried in St. Mary's, Youghal.

== Marriage and issue ==
Edward Villiers married, c. 1612, Barbara St John, daughter of Sir John St John (c. 1552–1594) of Lydiard Tregoze, Wiltshire, and Lucy Hungerford (1560–1598), daughter of Sir Walter Hungerford (c.1526–1596) of Farleigh Castle, Somerset, by Anne Dormer (1525–1603), by whom he had ten children.

Villiers's wife was the niece of Oliver St John, created Viscount Grandison on 3 January 1612. Grandison had no issue, and Villiers's half-brother, Buckingham, arranged for Villiers and his sons to inherit the Grandison title.

Villiers's eldest son William Villiers, who succeeded as 2nd Viscount Grandison in 1630, and was the father of Barbara Villiers, Duchess of Cleveland, mistress of King Charles II. Villiers's second and third sons, John Villiers (1616-1659) and George Villiers (1618-1699), succeeded as 3rd and 4th Viscounts Grandison. His fourth son, Sir Edward Villiers, was the father of Edward Villiers, 1st Earl of Jersey.

Edward Villiers had two daughters, Eleanor and Barbara Villiers. Eleanor Villiers was a maid of honour in the household of Henrietta Maria of France, and performed in the masque The Shepherd's Paradise. She had a daughter with Henry Jermyn which caused a scandal.

Villiers's widow, Barbara, died in 1672.

== Notes ==
Government offices
Preceded by Sir Richard Martin	Master of the Mint; 1617–1623	Succeeded by Sir Randal Cranfield
Parliament of England
Preceded by Sir Humphrey May; Edmund Doubleday	Member of Parliament for Westminster; 1621–1625; With: Edmund Doubleday 1620; William Mann 1621–1625	Succeeded by Sir Robert Pye; Peter Heywood
