= Thomas Clarges =

English politician (1618–1695)

Sir Thomas Clarges (c 1618 – 4 October 1695) was an English politician who sat in the House of Commons at various times between 1656 and 1695. He played an important part in bringing about the Restoration of the Monarchy in 1660.

== Origins ==
Clarges was the son of John Clarges and his wife Anne Leaver. He was an apothecary in London. His sister Anne Clarges was the wife of the royalist General George Monck, later 1st Duke of Albemarle.

== Career ==
In 1656 Clarges was elected Member of Parliament for the Sheriffdoms of Ross, Sutherland, and Cromarty in the Second Protectorate Parliament. In 1659 he was MP for the Boroughs of Banff and Cullen, and Aberdeen and for the Boroughs of Peebles, Selkirk, Jedburgh, Lauder, North Berwick, Dunbar and Haddington in the Third Protectorate Parliament. When Richard Cromwell became Lord Protector he ordered Clarges to go immediately to Scotland with his letters to George Monck, Clarge's brother-in-law, to obtain Monck's view of his protectorate. Clarges became Monck's main agent as he set about planning the Restoration of the Monarchy.

In April 1660 Clarges was elected Member of Parliament for Westminster in the Convention Parliament. On 5 May Monck sent Clarges as an envoy to King Charles II at Breda carrying a letter from the general, in an answer to a letter from Charles, and the address of the officers of the army pledging support. Monck also wrote another short letter in his own hand informing Charles that "he chose to send Mr. Clarges to him, because he was the only person to be trusted in the nearest concernments and consultations, for his restoration, as one, to whom he desired his majesty to give credit to what he should say on that behalf". Clarges was well received and was knighted at Breda in May 1660.

In 1666 Clarges was elected MP Southwark in the Cavalier Parliament and sat until 1679. He was elected MP for Christchurch in 1679 and sat until 1685. He was elected MP for Oxford University in 1689 and sat until his death in 1695.

Clarges was a significant landowner in Mayfair, London, where he had a house in Piccadilly. In 1686, he acquired 15 St James's Square to serve as the London home of the Marchioness de Gouvernet. His properties in Mayfair are commemorated in the name of Clarges Street, which is near Albemarle Street named after the site of the residence of his nephew Christopher Monck, 2nd Duke of Albemarle.

== Marriage and children ==
Clarges married Mary Proctor, daughter of George Proctor of Norwell Woodhouse in Nottinghamshire. They had a son Sir Walter Clarges, 1st Baronet.
