= Richard Hodges (MP) =

16th-century English politician

Richard Hodges (by 1523 – 1572) was an English politician.

He was a member (MP) of the parliament of England for Westminster in April 1554, 1555 and 1559.
