= Gilbert Gerard (died 1683) =

Member of the Parliament of England

Sir Gilbert Gerard (c 1618 – 1683) supported the Parliamentary cause in the English Civil War, held a number of positions during the Protectorate, sat in the House of Commons in the Convention Parliament of 1660, and was knighted shortly after the Restoration.

== Biography ==
Gerard was a younger son of Sir Gilbert Gerard, 1st Baronet of Harrow on the Hill and his wife Mary Barrington, daughter of Sir Francis Barrington. He was admitted at Emmanuel College, Cambridge on 20 August 1634. From 1640 to 1653 he was Clerk of the Council of the Duchy of Lancaster and was a commissioner for volunteers for Middlesex in 1644. He was a member of Gray's Inn and was called to the bar in 1648. He was Clerk of the Council of the Duchy of Lancaster from 1655 and was commissioner for alienations in 1656 and for forest appeals in 1657.

In 1660, Gerard was elected Member of Parliament for Westminster in the Convention Parliament. He was knighted on 18 March 1661. Gerard died unmarried in 1683 and was buried at Harrow on 5 November 1683.

== Sources ==
- Burke, John; Burke, Sir John Bernard (1838). A genealogical and heraldic history of the extinct and dormant baronetcies. p. 217.
- Helms, M. W.; Cruickshanks, Eveline (1983). Henning, B.D. (ed.). Gerard, Gilbert I (c.1618-83), of Gray's Inn and Harrow-on-the-Hill, Mdx. Boydell and Brewer.
- Shaw, William Arthur (1906). The Knights of England: A complete record from the earliest time to the present day of the knights of all the orders of chivalry in England, Scotland, and Ireland, and of knights bachelors, incorporating a complete list of knights bachelors dubbed in Ireland. Vol. 2. London: Sherratt and Hughes. p. 233.
