= Edward Grosvenor =

Edward Grosvenor was an English soldier and politician who sat in the House of Commons from 1656 to 1659. He served in the Parliamentary army in the English Civil War.

Grosvenor was quartermaster-general in the Parliamentary army. He was created MA at Oxford University on 19 May 1649. In 1656, he was elected Member of Parliament for Middlesex in the Second Protectorate Parliament. He was re-elected MP for Middlesex in 1659 for the Third Protectorate Parliament.

Parliament of England
Preceded by Thomas Latham; Thomas Falconbridge	Member of Parliament for Middlesex; 1656–1659; With: Edward Cary 1656; Richard Sherwyn 1659	Succeeded by Not represented in Restored Rump
