= John Dodington (died 1585) =

16th-century English politician

John Dodington (c. 1522 – 1585) of Westminster, was an English Member of Parliament. He represented Westminster in 1572. Offices held include clerk of the engrossment of pay books, comptroller of the pipe c. 1566; and burgess of Westminster 1585.
