= Thomas Knyvet, 1st Baron Knyvet =

English courtier and MP

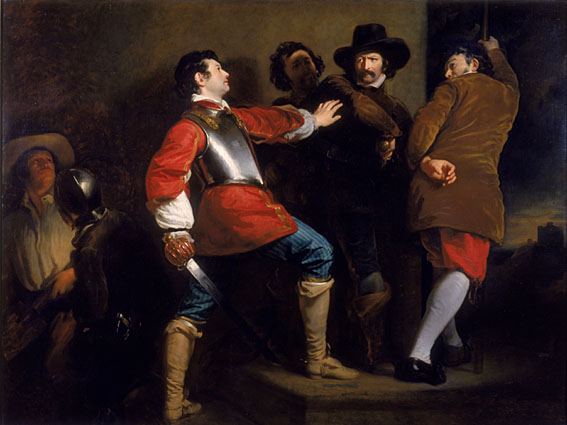
The Discovery of the Gunpowder Plot (c. 1823) by Henry Perronet Briggs; Knyvet wears the breastplate

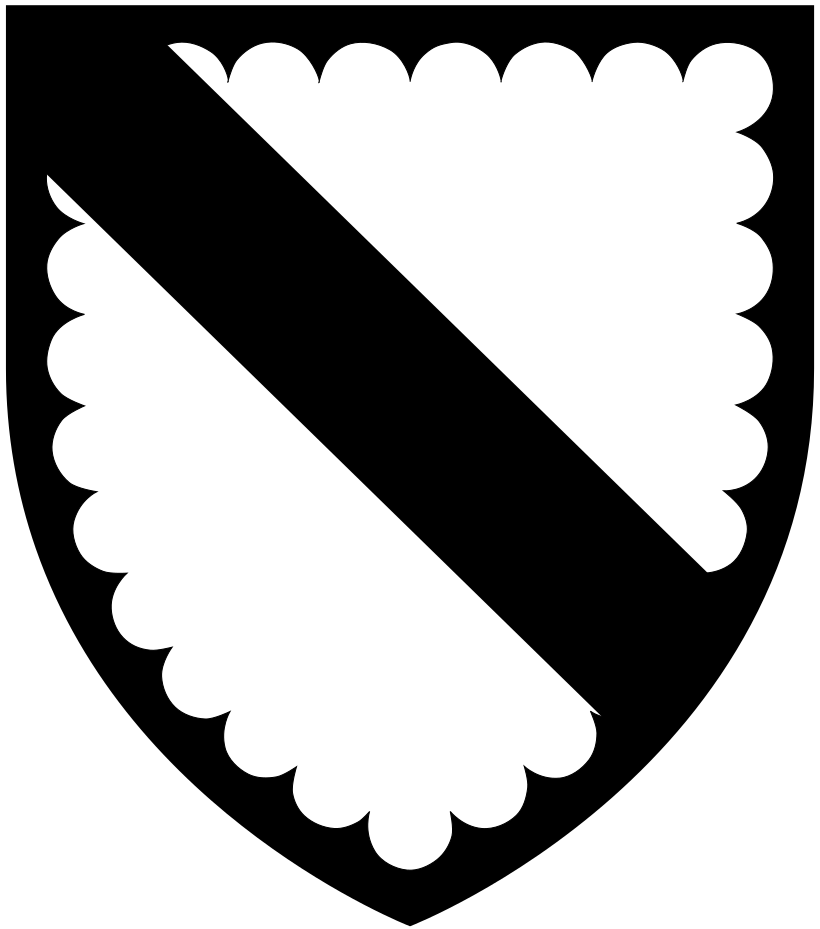
Arms of Knyvett: Argent, a bend sable a bordure engrailed of the last

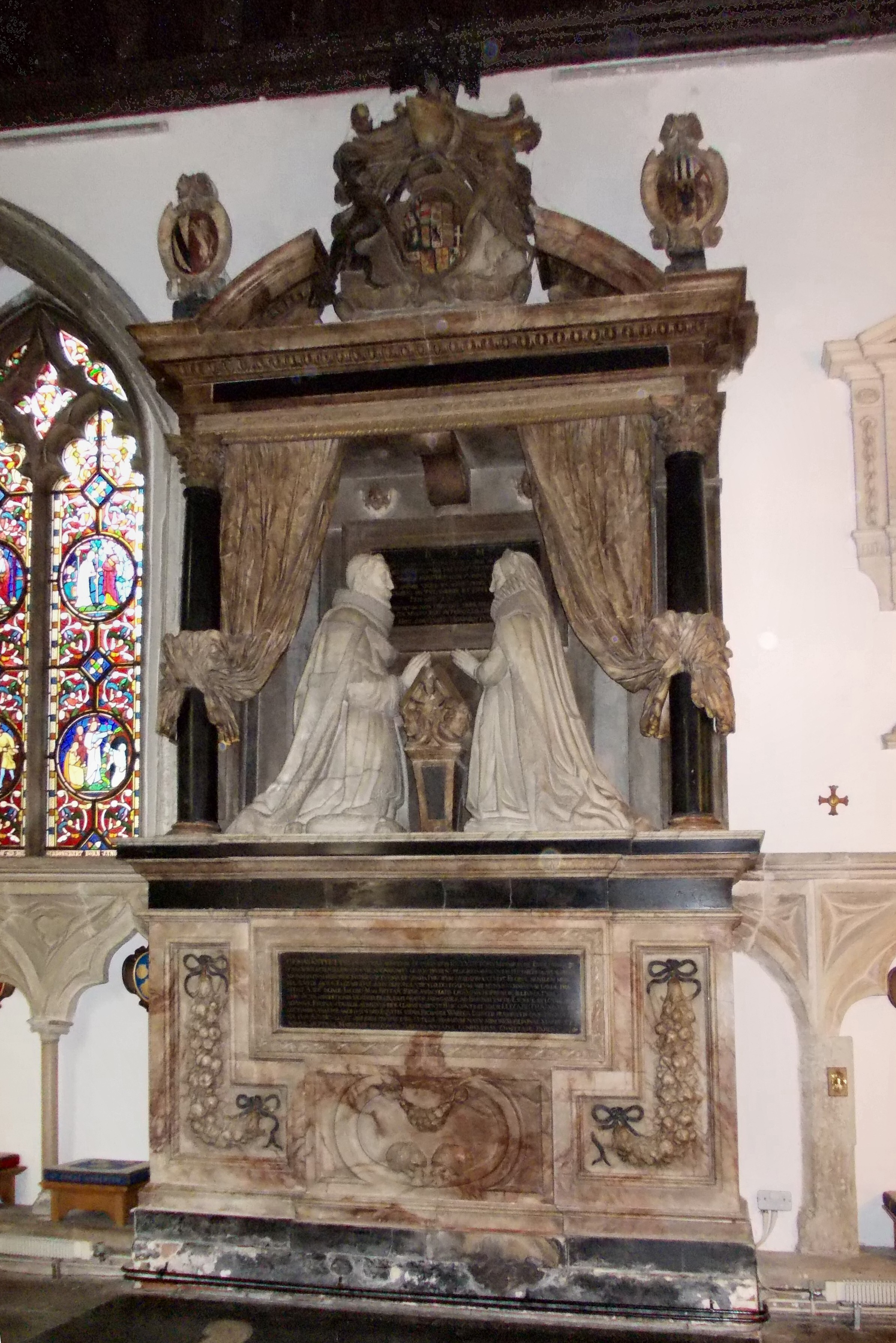
Monument to Thomas Knyvet, 1st Baron Knyvet, Stanwell Church, Surrey

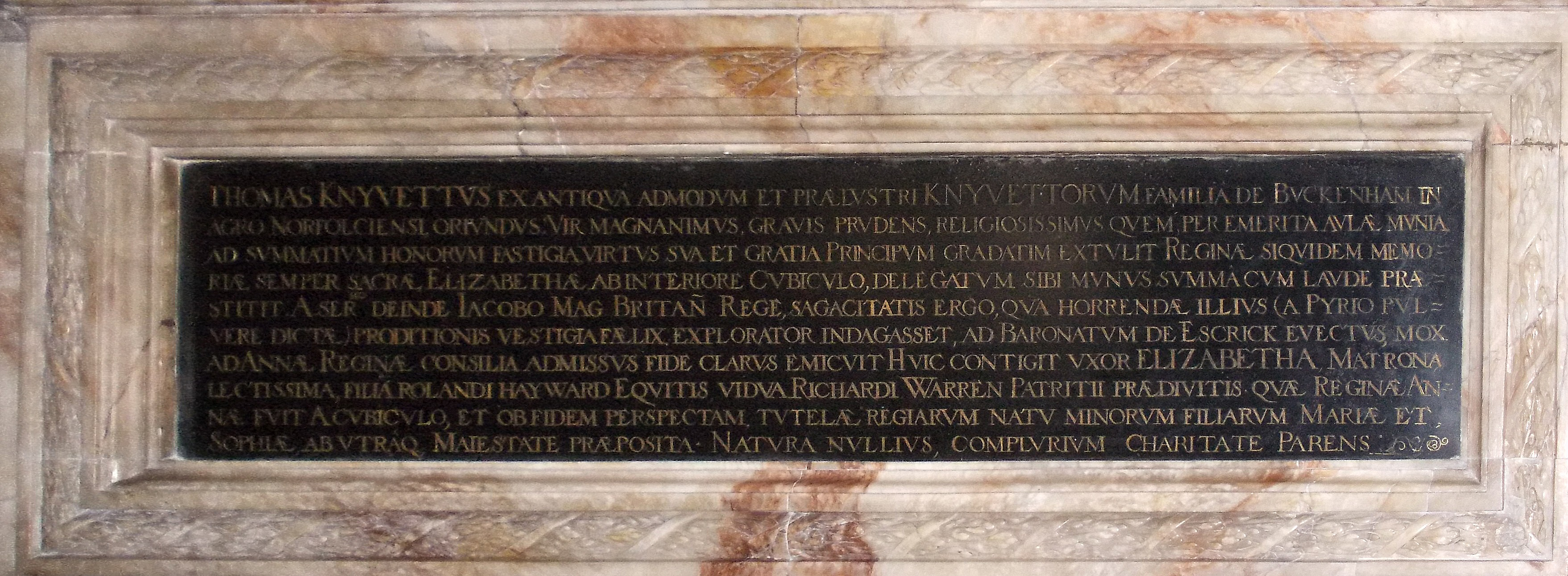
Latin inscription on mural monument to Thomas Knyvet, 1st Baron Knyvet, Stanwell Church

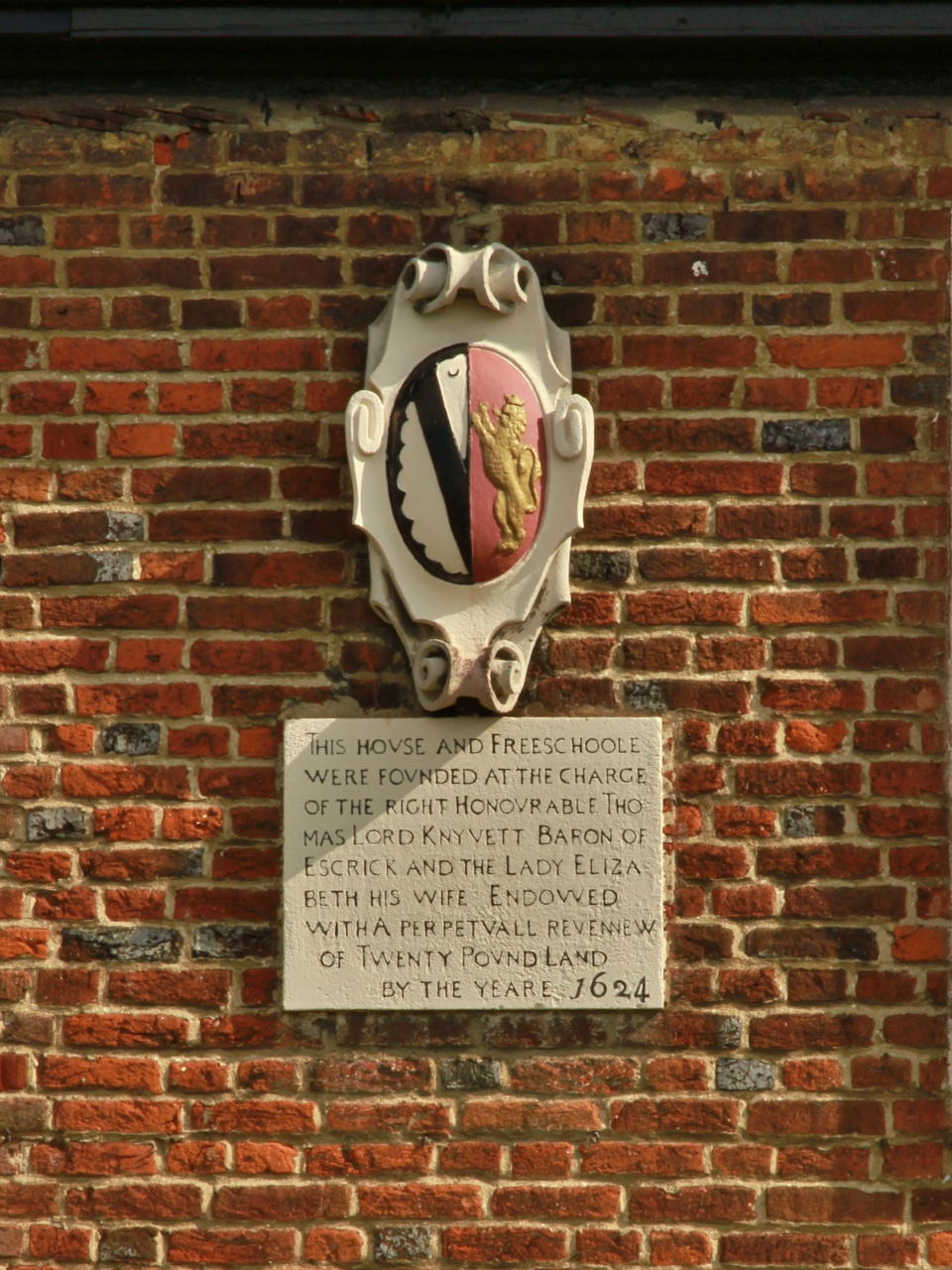
Founder's inscribed tablet and arms, above entrance door of Lord Knyvett's Free School, High Street, Stanwell, Middlesex. Founded by the will of Thomas Knyvet, 1st Baron Knyvet. The cartouche above shows the arms of Kynvett impaling Hayward (Gules, a lion rampant argent crowned or), for his wife Elizabeth Hayward

Thomas Knyvet, 1st Baron Knyvet (/nɪvɪt/; or Knevytt, Knyvett, Knevett, Knevitt; 1545 – 27 July 1622) was an English courtier and Member of Parliament who played a part in foiling the Gunpowder Plot.

== Family ==
Thomas Knyvet was the second son of Sir Henry Knyvet of Charlton, Wiltshire, and Anne Pickering, daughter of Sir Christopher Pickering of Killington, Westmorland. She was the widow of Francis Weston who had been executed in 1536.

His niece, Catherine Knyvet, was married to Thomas Howard, 1st Earl of Suffolk. On 21 July 1597, Knyvet married Elizabeth Hayward, the daughter of Sir Rowland Hayward and widow of Richard Warren of Claybury, Essex.

== Career ==
Knyvet attended Jesus College, Cambridge. He was a Gentleman of the Privy Chamber to Queen Elizabeth I, and in 1592 was made Master at Arms. He was elected Member of Parliament for Thetford in 1601. He served as Warden of the Royal Mint from 1599 to 1621. He was granted the manor of Stanwell in 1603, and was knighted in 1604.

=== Jewels of Queen Elizabeth ===
In December 1603 and January 1604 Knyvett had orders from King James concerning jewels that had belonged to Queen Elizabeth. On Christmas Eve 1603 he brought to Hampton Court some chests of jewels which he had kept at Westminster Palace on the instructions of Queen Elizabeth. Four chests had been the responsibility of Katherine Howard, Countess of Nottingham. The others boxes were open and the jewels examined. After discussion with Sir George Home, Roger Aston, and the Earl of Nottingham, some jewels were sent to the goldsmiths John Spilman and William Herrick for valuation, with an ivory coffer, and a "great rich glass set with diamonds rubies emeralds and pearls, made in the form of a woman upon a pillar or case holding a clock with diverse motions" brought from the Tower of London. Knyvett also took some of the old queen's jewels to Peter Vanlore to exchange for a new piece with a large table ruby and two great lozenge diamonds.

=== Gunpowder plot ===
Knyvet was the most active intervener in foiling the Gunpowder Plot. On the evening of 26 October 1605, the Catholic Lord Monteagle received an anonymous letter warning him to stay away from Parliament during the opening, and to "retyre youre self into yowre contee whence yow maye expect the event in safti for ... they shall receyve a terrible blowe this parleament". Monteagle's letter was shown to King James. The King ordered Knyvet to conduct a search of the cellars underneath Parliament, which he carried out with Edmund Doubleday in the early hours of 5 November. Guy Fawkes was arrested by Knyvet whilst leaving the cellar shortly after midnight. Inside, the barrels of gunpowder were discovered hidden under piles of firewood and coal.

=== Princess Mary ===
After foiling the plot Knyvet was given charge of the education of the short-lived Princess Mary. His tomb epitaph mentions his wife's role in the household of Mary and her sister Sophia, and Knyvet's other offices. By royal grant of a peerage he entered the House of Lords as Baron Knyvet of Escrick, Yorkshire in 1607, where he was lord of the manor. He was appointed a Privy Councillor, member of the council to Queen Anne, and Warden of the Mint. In 1613, the manor of Staines was granted him outright.

He maintained a long-running feud with Edward de Vere, 17th Earl of Oxford. Knyvet's niece, Anne Vavasour, was the Earl's mistress, and on 21 March 1581 bore his illegitimate son, Edward Vere. On numerous occasions, servants on either side were killed. On one occasion, Knyvet injured Oxford, apparently in the leg.

When Lord Knyvet died in July 1622 his will provided for the foundation of a free-school in Stanwell — the Lord Knyvet School was founded in 1624. An effigy of him and his wife features in the chancel of Stanwell's St Mary's parish church.

== Knyvet House ==
Knyvet occupied as his London townhouse the first house known on the site of 10 Downing Street, the modern-day residence of the British Prime Minister, in a large timber and brick building with an L-shaped garden. It was first leased to him in 1581 by Queen Elizabeth I at which point it became known as Knyvet House, and his lifetime lease was extended in 1604 to extend to his heirs. The house was described by the parliamentary commissioners in 1650 as:

"...built part wth Bricke and part wth Tymber and Flemish qalle and covered with Tyle, consistinge of a Large and spacious hall, wainscoted round, well Lighted, and Paved wth brick Pavements, two parls whereof one is Wainscoted round from the seelinge to ye floor, one Buttery, one seller, one Large kitchen well paved with stone and well fitted and Joynted and well fitted wth dreser boards….

"And above stayres in the first story one large and spacious dyneinge Roome, Wainscoted round from the seelinge to the floore, well flored, Lighted and seeled, and fitted wth a faire Chimney wth a foote pace of Paynted Tyle in the same. Also 6 more Roomes and 3 Closetts in the same flore all well lighted and seeled. And in the second story 4 garretts..."

Knyvett built new lodgings for the women of Princess Mary's household in 1605, and he supervised improvements to St James's Park.

The house passed to his niece, Elizabeth Hampden, aunt of Oliver Cromwell, and in her lifetime it adopted her surname. After the lease expired on Hampden House and garden in 1682, George Downing redeveloped the site and adjoining premises.

Peerage of England
New creation	Baron Knyvet; 1607–1622	Extinct
