= Duration of English parliaments before 1660 =

This article augments the List of parliaments of England to be found elsewhere (see link below) and to precede Duration of English, British and United Kingdom parliaments from 1660, with additional information which could not be conveniently incorporated in them.

The definition of which bodies should be classified as parliaments becomes increasingly problematic before the accession of the Tudor monarchs, starting with Henry VII of England. Different sources may vary in the number of Parliaments in a particular reign.

The "No." columns in the tables below contain the number counting forward from the accession of particular monarchs of England before 1660 (or the Commonwealth and Protectorate regimes of the 1650s). The "-Plt" columns count backwards from the parliament elected in 2005. This is not the conventional way of numbering parliaments.

The "Duration" column is calculated from the date of the first meeting of the parliament to that of dissolution, using a year-month-day format.

== Origin of parliament ==
Parliament grew out of the Curia Regis, which was a body which advised the king on legislative matters. It had come into existence after the Norman Conquest of England in 1066. It replaced the earlier Anglo-Saxon institution of the Witenagemot, which had a similar mix of important clerical and lay members, but different powers.

The Curia Regis (known in English as the council or court) was composed of prominent church leaders (archbishops, bishops and some abbots) and the king's feudal tenants-in-chief (in effect the landowning aristocracy, the earls and barons).

The point at which some meetings of the prelates and lay magnates became known as parliaments is difficult to define precisely.

The term parliamentum was used in the general sense of a meeting at which negotiations took place. The word began to be used to refer to meetings of the council in the 1230s and 1240s. The earliest known official use was by the Court of King's Bench which in November 1236 adjourned a case to be heard at a parliamentum at Westminster due on the following 13 January.

A meeting of the council was held at Merton Abbey in 1236. This gathering became known as the Parliament of Merton. It passed certain legislation, which constitutes the first entry in the official collection of the statutes of England, published in the nineteenth century.

It may be that the meeting at Merton involved no innovation, but owes its prominence to the chance survival of some records which were copied into a collection of statutes from the second half of the fourteenth century.

The list of parliaments in this article commences with a meeting in London in 1242, which was summoned in 1241. This again may not have represented any real innovation, but rather is given prominence by the chance survival of records. Powell and Wallis confirm that a copy of the writ of summons has survived, possibly the earliest still in existence. Dramatic political events at the meeting were recorded by the chronicler Matthew Paris, so it is known that the king asked for a tax, which the council (retrospectively dubbed a parliament) refused to grant. It is unlikely that the gathering was seen by contemporaries as any different from the similar meetings of the Curia Regis that had been held since the Conquest, but as a list of parliaments must start at some time this was the meeting chosen by the source from which this list is drawn.

== List of parliaments from 1241 ==
The English civil year started on 25 March until 1752. The years used in this article have been converted to the new style where necessary. Old style dates are a year earlier than the new style for dates between 1 January and 24 March. No attempt has been made to compensate for the eleven days which did not occur in September 1752, both in England and Scotland, as well as in other British controlled territories, when the day which followed 2 September was 14 September. This was done to bring Britain and its empire fully into line with the Gregorian calendar.

There were some meetings before 1241 which are sometimes called parliaments, notably the Parliament of Merton in 1236.

Early parliaments did not, so far as is known, include representatives of the communities (or commons) of England. They were composed of important church officials and landowners, whom the king summoned individually to advise him, similar to the group of men which eventually became known as the House of Lords.

The sheriffs of the English counties were ordered to send knights of the shire to attend a number of parliaments before 1265, but they were not required to have them chosen by election. No such summonses are known to have required the attendance of citizens of cities or burgesses of other boroughs. Records of this sort of summons survive for the Oxford Parliament, which was the seventh parliament of King Henry III, assembled 27 October 1258 and presumed dissolved when writs de expensis were issued on 4 November 1258, and for the same king's sixteenth parliament, summoned on 4 June 1264 and assembled on 22 June 1264, although the date of dissolution is unknown.

Montfort's Parliament of 1265 was the first parliament of England to include representatives chosen by the counties (or shires), the cities, and the boroughs, groups who eventually became the House of Commons, although to begin with Lords and Commons met all together,

In 1320 it became the invariable practice to summon the Commons to Parliament. If the Commons were not summoned to an early parliament, this is indicated in a footnote. The normal place for parliaments to meet was in Westminster. If a different location is known, it is indicated in a note. Unusual features of the dates of summons, attendance or dissolution of a parliament are included in a note.

== Parliaments of King Henry III ==
King Henry III reigned between 18/19 October 1216 and 16 November 1272.

No.	Summoned	Elected	Assembled	Dissolved	Duration	Presiding officer¹	-Plt	Note
1st²	14 December 1241	n/a	27 January 1242	...	...	n/a	347	...
2nd²	...	n/a	9 February 1248	...	...	n/a	346	...
3rd²	11 February 1254	n/a	26 April 1254	...	...	n/a	345	...
4th²	...	n/a	18 April 1255	...	...	n/a	344	...
5th²	...	n/a	9 June 1258	...	...	n/a	343	...
6th²	...	n/a	13 October 1258	...	...	n/a	342	...
7th	...	n/a	27 October 1258	4 November 1258	0-0-9	Peter de Montfort	341	a
8th²	...	n/a	9 February 1259	...	...	n/a	340	...
9th²	...	n/a	13 October 1259	...	...	n/a	339	...
10th²	...	n/a	>30 April 1260	...	...	n/a	338	b
11th²	...	n/a	8 July 1260	...	...	n/a	337	...
12th²	...	n/a	13 October 1260	...	...	n/a	336	...
13th²	...	n/a	c.23 February 1261	...	...	n/a	335	b
14th²	...	n/a	9 September 1263	>18 September 1263	0-0-10+	n/a	334	c
15th²	...	n/a	13 October 1263	...	...	n/a	333	...
16th	4 June 1264	n/a	22 June 1264	...	...	n/a	332	d
17th	14 December 1264	1264/65	20 January 1265	15 February 1265	0-0-27	unknown	331	e
18th²	...	n/a	14 September 1265	...	...	n/a	330	...
19th²	...	n/a	9 February 1267	...	...	n/a	329	...
20th²	...	n/a	13 October 1268	...	...	n/a	328	...
21st²	...	n/a	24 June 1269	...	...	n/a	327	...
22nd²	...	n/a	c.13 October 1270	...	...	n/a	326	b
23rd²	...	n/a	c.>29 September 1272	...	...	n/a	325	b

Notes:-

^{1} The presiding officer of the House of Commons was initially known as the "Prolocutor" and sometimes as the Parlour, but the term most often used was "Speaker" and this became the title always used from the 1540s onwards.
^{2} No commoners were summoned.

- (a) 7th: This Parliament was at Oxford. It is sometimes known as the Mad Parliament. Knights of the shire (representing counties) were the only commoners summoned. They were not required to be chosen by election. The date writs de expenses were issued is assumed to be the date of dissolution.
- (b) The exact date when the Parliament assembled is unknown.
- (c) The exact date when the Parliament was dissolved is unknown.
- (d) 16th: Knights of the shire were the only commoners summoned. They were not required to be chosen by election.
- (e) 17th: It is sometimes known as Montfort's Parliament. This is the first Parliament to which representatives of cities and boroughs were summoned, as well as knights of the shire. It is also the first Parliament to which the representatives were required to be chosen by election. The date writs de expenses were issued is assumed to be the date of dissolution.

== Parliaments of King Edward I ==
King Edward I reigned between 20 November 1272 – 7 July 1307.

No.	Summoned	Elected	Assembled	Dissolved	Duration	Presiding officer¹	-Plt	Note
1st	16 February 1275	1275	25 April 1275	...	...	unknown	324	a
2nd	1 September 1275	1275	13 October 1275	24 October 1275	0-0-12	unknown	323	b
3rd²	...	n/a	c.3 May 1276	...	...	n/a	322	c
4th²	...	n/a	>29 September 1276	...	...	n/a	321	c
5th²	...	n/a	1 May 1278	...	...	n/a	320	...
6th²	...	n/a	8 July 1278	...	...	n/a	319	...
7th²	...	n/a	29 September 1278	...	...	n/a	318	...
8th²	...	n/a	c.16 April 1279	...	...	n/a	317	c
9th²	...	n/a	c.20 October 1279	...	...	n/a	316	c
10th²	...	n/a	c.12 May 1280	...	...	n/a	315	c
11th²	...	n/a	c.>29 September 1280	...	...	n/a	314	c
12th²	...	n/a	c.11 May 1281	...	...	n/a	313	c
13th²	...	n/a	c.>29 September 1281	...	...	n/a	312	c
14th²	...	n/a	4 May 1285	...	...	n/a	311	...
15th²	...	n/a	c.>14 April 1286	...	...	n/a	310	c
16th²	...	n/a	c.24 April 1286	...	...	n/a	309	c
17th²	...	n/a	>25 December 1289	...	...	n/a	308	c
18th²	...	n/a	>13 January 1290	...	...	n/a	307	c
19th	13 June 1290	1290	15 July 1290	...	...	unknown	306	d
20th	...	1290	27 October 1290	...	...	unknown	305	...
21st	...	1290/91	7 January 1291	...	...	unknown	304	...
22nd	...	1291/92	8 January 1292	...	...	unknown	303	...
23rd²	...	n/a	2 June 1292	...	...	n/a	302	e
24th²	...	n/a	13 October 1292	17 November 1292	0-1-4	n/a	301	e
25th	...	?1293	>29 March 1293	...	...	unknown	300	c
26th	...	1293	13 October 1293	...	...	unknown	299	...
27th	...	1293	>25 December 1293	...	...	unknown	298	c
28th²	24 June 1295	n/a	1–4 August 1295	...	...	n/a	297	c
29th	30 September 1295+	1295	27 November 1295	4 December 1295	0-0-8	unknown	296	f
30th	26 August 1296	1296	3 November 1296	29 November 1296	0-0-27	unknown	295	g
31st²	26 January 1297	n/a	24 February 1297	...	...	n/a	294	...
32nd²	...	n/a	8 July 1297	...	...	n/a	293	...
33rd	6 October 1297	1297	15 September 1297	14 October 1297	0-1-5	unknown	292	h
34th	15 March 1298	March 1298	30 March 1298	...	...	unknown	291	i
35th	10 April 1298	1298	25 May 1298	...	...	unknown	290	j
36th²	6 February 1299	n/a	8 March 1299	...	...	n/a	289	...
37th²	10 April 1299	n/a	3 May 1299	...	...	n/a	288	...
38th²	21 September 1299	n/a	18 October 1299	...	...	n/a	287	...
39th	29 December 1299	1299/00	6 March 1300	20 March 1300	0-0-15	unknown	286	k
40th	26 September 1300	1300/01	20 January 1301	30 January 1301	0-0-8/11	unknown	285	l
41st²	2 June 1302	n/a	1 July 1302	...	...	n/a	284	...
42nd	14 July 1302	1302	14 October 1302	21 October 1302	0-0-8	unknown	283	m
43rd	12 November 1304	1304/05	28 February 1305	20 March 1305	0-0-21	unknown	282	k
44th²	15 July 1305	n/a	15 September 1305	...	...	n/a	281	...
45th	5 April 1306	1306	30 May 1306	30 May 1306	0-0-1	unknown	280	n
46th	3 November 1306	1306/07	20 January 1307	19 March 1307	0-1-27	unknown	279	o

Notes:-

^{1} The presiding officer of the House of Commons was initially known as the "Prolocutor" and sometimes as the Parlour, but the term most often used was "Speaker" and this became the title always used from the 1540s onwards.
^{2} No commoners were summoned.

- (a) 1st: For the first time since 1264-65 the representatives of the communities of the Realm are known to have been summoned to Parliament.
- (b) 2nd: The knights of the shires only were summoned to this Parliament. Date of grant of supply is deemed to be the date of dissolution.
- (c) The exact date when the Parliament assembled is unknown.
- (d) 19th: Knights only summoned 13–14 June 1290. Assembled 23 April 1290 Lords and 15 July 1290 Commons. After this Parliament it became fairly usual for the representatives of the counties, cities and boroughs to be summoned to attend Parliament and from 1320 they were always included.
- (e) This Parliament included Scottish members.
- (f) 29th: Model Parliament summoned 30 September, 1 and 3 October 1295. This is the traditional start of the regular participation of the Commons in Parliament. Date of grant of supply is deemed to be the date of dissolution.
- (g) Date of grant of supply is deemed to be the date of dissolution.
- (h) 33rd: Summoned 30 September 1297 (peers) and 6 October 1297 (knights of the shire). Assembled 9 October 1297 Lords and 15 October 1297 Commons. Met in London. Date of grant of supply is deemed to be the date of dissolution.
- (i) 34th: Met in York.
- (j) 35th: Summoned 10, 11 and 13 April 1298.
- (k) Date of issue of Writs de expensis is deemed to be the date of dissolution.
- (l) 40th: Met in Lincoln. Dissolved 27–30 January 1301 (when writs de expensis were issued).
- (m) 42nd: Summoned 14, 20 and 24 July 1303. Met in London. Date of issue of Writs de expensis deemed to be the date of dissolution.
- (n) 45th: Assembled and dissolved 30 May 1306. Date of issue of Writs de expensis is deemed to be the date of dissolution.
- (o) 46th: Met in Carlisle. Deemed dissolved when writs de expensis were issued 20 January 1307 (burgesses only) and 19 March 1307 (knights only).

== Parliaments of King Edward II ==
King Edward II reigned between 7 July 1307 – 20 January 1327.

No.	Summoned	Elected	Assembled	Dissolved	Duration	Presiding Officer¹	-Plt	Note
1st	26 August 1307	1307	13 October 1307	16 October 1307	0-0-4	unknown	278	a
2nd	19 January 1308	1308	3 March 1308	...	...	unknown	277	...
3rd²	10 March 1308	n/a	28 April 1308	...	...	n/a	276	...
4th²	16 August 1308	n/a	20 October 1308	...	...	n/a	275	...
5th	4 March 1309	1309	27 April 1309	13 May 1309	0-0-17	unknown	274	a
6th²	11 June 1309	n/a	27 July 1309	...	...	n/a	273	...
7th²	26 October 1309	n/a	8 February 1310	12 April 1310	0-2-4	n/a	272	...
8th	16 June 1311	1311	8 August 1311	18 December 1311	0-4-10	unknown	271	b
9th	3 June 1312	1312	20 August 1312	16 December 1312	0-3-27	unknown	270	a
10th	8 January 1313	1313	18 March 1313	9 May 1313	0-1-22	unknown	269	a
11th	23 May 1313	1313	8 July 1313	27 July 1313	0-0-20	unknown	268	a
12th	26 July 1313	1313	23 September 1313	15 November 1313	0-1-23	unknown	267	a
13th	29 July 1314	1314	9 September 1314	27/28 September 1314	0-0-19/20	unknown	266	a
14th	24 October 1314	1314/15	20 January 1315	9 March 1315	0-1-17	unknown	265	a
15th	16 October 1315	1315/16	27 January 1316	20 February 1316	0-0-25	unknown	264	c
16th	24–25 August 1318	1318	20 October 1318	9 December 1318	0-1-19	unknown	263	a
17th	20 March 1319	1319	6 May 1319	25 May 1319	0-0-20	unknown	262	a
18th²	6 November 1319	n/a	20 January 1320	...	...	n/a	261	...
19th	5 August 1320	1320	6 October 1320	25/26 October 1320	0-0-20/21	unknown	260	a
20th	15 May 1321	1321	15 July 1321	22 August 1321	0-1-7	unknown	259	a
21st	14 March 1322	1322	2 May 1322	19 May 1322	0-0-18	unknown	258	a
22nd	18 September 1322	1322	14 November 1322	29 November 1322	0-0-16	unknown	257	d
23rd	20 November 1323	1323/24	23 February 1324	18 March 1324	0-0-25	unknown	256	a
24th	6 May 1325	1325	25 June 1325	...	...	unknown	255	e
25th	10 October 1325	1325	18 November 1325	5 December 1325	0-0-18	unknown	254	a
26th	28 October 1326	1326/27	7 January 1327	...	...	William Trussell	253	f

Notes:-

^{1} The presiding officer of the House of Commons was initially known as the "Prolocutor" and sometimes as the Parlour, but the term most often used was "Speaker" and this became the title always used from the 1540s onwards.
^{2} No commoners were summoned.

- (a) The date writs de expenses were issued is assumed to be the date of dissolution.
- (b) 8th: Met in London. The date writs de expenses were issued is assumed to be the date of dissolution.
- (c) 15th: Met in Lincoln. The date writs de expenses were issued is assumed to be the date of dissolution.
- (d) 15th: Met in York. The date writs de expenses were issued is assumed to be the date of dissolution.
- (e) 24th: Only MPs for the Cinque Ports were summoned. Met in London. The date writs de expenses were issued is assumed to be the date of dissolution.
- (f) 26th: This Parliament continued after the deposition of the King into the next reign. See 1st Parliament of King Edward III for further details and duration.

== Parliaments of King Edward III ==
King Edward III reigned between 25 January 1327 – 21 June 1377.

No.	Summoned	Elected	Assembled	Dissolved	Duration	Presiding Officer¹	-Plt	Note
1st	...	...	...	9 March 1327	0-2-2	William Trussell	253	a
2nd	7 August 1327	1327	15 September 1327	23 September 1327	0-0-9	William Trussell	252	b
3rd	10 December 1327	1327/28	7 February 1328	5 March 1328	0-0-28	unknown	251	c
4th	5 March 1328	1328	24 April 1328	14 May 1328	0-0-21	unknown	250	d
5th	28 August 1328	1328	16 October 1328	22 February 1329	0-4-6	unknown	249	e
6th	25 January 1330	1330	11 March 1330	21 March 1330	0-0-11	unknown	248	d
7th	23 October 1330	1330	26 November 1330	9 December 1330	0-0-14	unknown	247	f
8th	16 July 1331	1331	30 September 1331	9 October 1331	0-0-10	unknown	246	b
9th	27 January 1332	1332	16 March 1332	21 March 1332	0-0-6	Henry de Beaumont	245	g
10th	20 July 1332	1332	9 September 1332	12 September 1332	0-0-4	Sir Geoffrey le Scrope	244	b
11th	20 October 1332	1332	4 December 1332	27 January 1333	0-1-23	unknown	243	...
12th	2 January 1334	1334	21 February 1334	2 March 1334	0-0-10	unknown	242	b
13th	24 July 1334	1334	19 September 1334	23 September 1334	0-0-5	unknown	241	d
14th	1 April 1335	1335	26 May 1335	3 June 1335	0-0-9	unknown	240	b
15th	22 January 1336	1336	11 March 1336	20 March 1336	0-0-10	unknown	239	d
16th	29 November 1336	1336/37	3 March 1337	c.16 March 1337	0-0-14	unknown	238	...
17th	20 December 1337	1337/38	3 February 1338	14 February 1338	0-0-12	unknown	237	h
18th	15 November 1338	1338/39	3 February 1339	17 February 1339	0-0-15	unknown	236	b
19th	25 August 1339	1339	13 October 1339	c.3 November 1339	0-0-22	unknown	235	i
20th	16 November 1339	1339/40	20 January 1340	19 February 1340	0-0-31	William Trussell	234	...
21st	21 February 1340	1340	29 March 1340	10 May 1340	0-1-11	William Trussell	233	b
22nd	30 May 1340	1340	12 July 1340	26 July 1340	0-0-15	William Trussell	232	b
23rd	3 March 1341	1341	23 April 1341	27–28 May 1341	0-1-4/5	unknown	231	b
24th	24 February 1343	1343	28 April 1343	20 May 1343	0-0-23	William Trussell	230	b
25th	20 April 1344	1344	7 June 1344	28 June 1344	0-0-22	unknown	229	b
26th	30 July 1346	1346	11 September 1346	20 September 1346	0-0-10	unknown	228	b
27th	13 November 1347	1347/48	14 January 1348	12 February 1348	0-0-30	William de Thorpe	227	b
28th	14 February 1348	1348	31 March 1348	13 April 1348	0-0-14	William de Thorpe	226	b
29th	25 November 1350	1350/51	9 February 1351	1 March 1351	0-0-21	William de Shareshull	225	b
30th	15 November 1351	1351/52	13 January 1352	11 February 1352	0-0-30	William de Shareshull	224	b
31st	15 March 1354	1354	28 April 1354	20 May 1354	0-0-23	unknown	223	b
32nd	20 September 1355	1355	23 November 1355	30 November 1355	0-0-8	unknown	222	b
33rd	15 February 1357	1357	17 April 1357	8–16 May 1357	0-0-22/30	unknown	221	b
34th	15 December 1357	1357/58	5 February 1358	27 February 1358	0-0-23	unknown	220	b
35th	3 April 1360	1360	15 May 1360	...	...	unknown	219	...
36th	20 November 1360	1360/61	24 January 1361	18 February 1361	0-0-26	unknown	218	b
37th	14 August 1362	1362	13 October 1362	17 November 1362	0-1-4	Sir Henry Green	217	b
38th	1 June 1363	1363	6 October 1363	30 October 1363	0-0-25	unknown	216	b
39th	4 December 1364	1364/65	20 January 1365	17 February 1365	0-0-28	unknown	215	...
40th	20 January 1366	1366	4 May 1366	11 May 1366	0-0-8	unknown	214	...
41st	24 February 1368	1368	1 May 1368	21 May 1368	0-0-21	unknown	213	...
42nd	6 April 1369	1369	3 June 1369	11 June 1369	0-0-9	unknown	212	b
43rd	8 January 1371	1371	24 February 1371	29 March 1371	0-1-5	unknown	211	b
44th	1 September 1372	1372	3 November 1372	24 November 1372	0-0-22	unknown	210	b
45th	4 October 1373	1373	21 November 1373	10 December 1373	0-0-20	unknown	209	b
46th	28 December 1375	1375/76	28 April 1376	10 July 1376	0-2-13	Sir Peter de la Mare	208	j
47th	1 December 1376	1376/77	27 January 1377	2 March 1377	0-1-3	Sir Thomas Hungerford²	207	k

Notes:-

^{1} The presiding officer of the House of Commons was initially known as the "Prolocutor" and sometimes as the Parlour, but the term most often used was "Speaker" and this became the title always used from the 1540s onwards.
^{2} Hungerford was the first presiding officer of the Commons to be recorded as having the title of Speaker.

- (a) 1st: Continued from the last reign. Date of issue of writs de expensis deemed to be date of dissolution.
- (b) Date of issue of writs de expensis deemed to be date of dissolution.
- (c) Met at Lincoln. Date of issue of writs de expensis deemed to be date of dissolution.
- (d) Met at York. Date of issue of writs de expensis deemed to be date of dissolution.
- (e) 5th: May have met at New Sarum (now more commonly called Salisbury), York or Northampton, as it is uncertain which meeting was of this Parliament and which were gatherings of lesser status. Date of issue of writs de expensis deemed to be date of dissolution.
- (f) Met at New Sarum (now more commonly called Salisbury). Date of issue of writs de expensis deemed to be date of dissolution.
- (g) Met at Winchester. Date of issue of writs de expensis deemed to be date of dissolution.
- (h) Met at Northampton. Date of issue of writs de expensis deemed to be date of dissolution.
- (i) Met at Northampton.
- (j) 46th: Known as the Good Parliament.
- (k) 47th: Known as the Bad Parliament. Date of issue of writs de expensis deemed to be date of dissolution.

== Parliaments of King Richard II ==
No.	Summoned	Elected	Assembled	Dissolved	Duration	Speaker	-Plt	Note
1st	4 August 1377	1377	13 October 1377	5 December 1377	...	Sir Peter de la Mare	206	...
2nd	3 September 1378	1378	20 October 1378	16 November 1378	...	Sir James Pickering	205	...
3rd	16 February 1379	1379	24 April 1379	27 May 1379	...	unknown	204	...
4th	20 October 1379	1379/80	16 January 1380	3 March 1380	...	Sir John Guildesborough	203	...
5th	26 August 1380	1380	5 November 1380	6 December 1380	...	Sir John Guildesborough	202	...
6th	16 July 1381	1381	3 November 1381	25 February 1382	...	Sir Richard Waldegrave	201	...
7th	24 March 1382	1382	7 May 1382	22 May 1382	...	Sir Richard Waldegrave	200	...
8th	9 August 1382	1382	6 October 1382	24 October 1382	...	Sir Richard Waldegrave	199	...
9th	7 January 1383	1383	23 February 1383	10 March 1383	...	Sir James Pickering	198	...
10th	20 August 1383	1383	26 October 1383	26 November 1383	...	Sir James Pickering	197	...
11th	3 March 1384	1384	29 April 1384	27 May 1384	...	Sir James Pickering	196	...
12th	28 September 1384	1384	12 November 1384	14 December 1384	...	Sir James Pickering	195	...
13th	3 September 1385	1385	20 October 1385	6 December 1385	...	Sir James Pickering	194	...
14th	8 August 1386	1386	1 October 1386	28 November 1386	...	Sir James Pickering	193	a
15th	17 December 1387	1387/88	3 February 1388	4 June 1388	...	Sir James Pickering	192	b
16th	28 July 1388	1388	9 September 1388	17 October 1388	...	Sir James Pickering	191	...
17th	6 December 1389	1389/90	17 January 1390	2 March 1390	...	Sir James Pickering	190	...
18th	12 September 1390	1390	12 November 1390	3 December 1390	...	Sir James Pickering	189	...
19th	7 September 1391	1391	3 November 1391	2 December 1391	...	unknown	188	...
20th	23 November 1392	1392/93	20 January 1393	10 February 1393	...	unknown	187	...
21st	13 November 1393	1393/94	27 January 1394	6 March 1394	...	Sir John Bussy	186	...
22nd	20 November 1394	1394/95	27 January 1395	15 February 1395	...	Sir John Bussy	185	...
23rd	30 November 1396	1396/97	22 January 1397	12 February 1397	...	Sir John Bussy	184	...
24th	18 July 1397	1397	17 September 1397	31 January 1398	...	Sir John Bussy	183	...
25th	19 August 1399	1389	30 September 1399	30 September 1399	...	unknown	182	...

Note:-

- (a) 14th: Known as the Wonderful Parliament.
- (b) 15th: Known as the Merciless Parliament.

== Parliaments of King Henry IV ==
No.	Summoned	Elected	Assembled	Dissolved	Duration	Speaker	-Plt	Note
1st	30 September 1399	1399	6 October 1399	19 November 1399	0-1-13	Sir John Cheney	181	a
1st	30 September 1399	1399	6 October 1399	19 November 1399	0-1-13	John Doreward	181	a
2nd	9 September 1400	1400/01	20 January 1401	10 March 1401	0-1-18	Sir Arnold Savage	180	
3rd	19 June 1402	1402	30 September 1402	25 November 1402	0-1-26	Sir Henry Redford	179	
4th	20 October 1403	1403/04	14 January 1404	20 March 1404	0-2-6	Sir Arnold Savage	178	
5th	25 August 1404	1404	6 October 1404	13 November 1404	0-1-7	Sir William Esturmy	177	
6th	21 December 1405	1405/06	1 March 1406	22 December 1406	0-9-21	Sir John Tiptoft	176	
7th	26 August 1407	1407	20 October 1407	2 December 1407	0-1-12	Thomas Chaucer	175	
8th	26 October 1409	1409/10	27 January 1410	9 May 1410	0-3-12	Thomas Chaucer	174	
9th	21 September 1411	1411	3 November 1411	19 December 1411	0-1-16	Thomas Chaucer	173	
10th	1 December 1412	1412/13	3 February 1413	20 March 1413	0-1-17	unknown	172	

Note:-

- (a) 1st: Known as a Convention Parliament.

== Parliaments of King Henry V ==
No.	Summoned	Elected	Assembled	Dissolved	Duration	Speaker	-Plt	Note
1st	22 March 1413	1413	14 May 1413	9 June 1413	0-0-27	William Stourton	171	
1st	22 March 1413	1413	14 May 1413	9 June 1413	0-0-27	John Doreward	171	
2nd	1 December 1413	1413/14	30 April 1414	29 May 1414	0-0-30	Sir Walter Hungerford	170	a
3rd	26 September 1414	1414	19 November 1414	...	...	Thomas Chaucer	169	
4th	12 August 1415	1415	4 November 1415	12 November 1415	0-0-9	Sir Richard Redman	168	b
5th	21 January 1416	1416	16 March 1416	May 1416	...	Sir Walter Beauchamp	167	
6th	3 September 1416	1416	19 October 1416	18 November 1416	0-0-31	Roger Flower	166	
7th	5 October 1417	1417	16 November 1417	17 December 1417	0-1-1	Roger Flower	165	
8th	24 August 1419	1419	16 October 1419	13 November 1419	0-0-29	Roger Flower	164	
9th	21 October 1420	1420	2 December 1420	...	...	Roger Hunt	163	
10th	26 February 1421	1421	2 May 1421	...	...	Thomas Chaucer	162	
11th	20 October 1421	1421	1 December 1421	...	...	Richard Baynard	161	

Note:-

- (a) Known as the Fire and Faggot Parliament.
- (b) Known as the Parliament of 1415.

== Parliaments of King Henry VI ==
No.	Summoned	Elected	Assembled	Dissolved	Duration	Speaker	-Plt	Note
1st	29 September 1422	1422	9 November 1422	18 December 1422		Roger Flower	160	
2nd	1 September 1423	1423	20 October 1423	28 February 1424		Sir John Russell	159	
3rd	24 February 1425	1425	30 April 1425	14 July 1425		Sir Thomas Walton	158	
4th	7 January 1426	1426	18 February 1426	1 June 1426		Sir Richard Vernon	157	a
5th	15 July 1427	1427	13 October 1427	25 March 1428		Sir John Tyrrell	156	
6th	12 July 1429	1429	22 September 1429	23 February 1430		William Alington	155	
7th	27 November 1430	1430/31	12 January 1431	20 March 1431		Sir John Tyrrell	154	
8th	25 February 1432	1432	12 May 1432	17 July 1432		Sir John Russell	153	
9th	24 May 1433	1433	8 July 1433	>c.18 December 1433		Roger Hunt	152	
10th	5 July 1435	1435	10 October 1435	23 December 1435		John Bowes	151	
11th	29 October 1436	1436/37	21 January 1437	27 March 1437		Sir John Tyrrell	150	
11th	29 October 1436	1436/37	21 January 1437	27 March 1437		William Burley	150	
12th	26 September 1439	1439	12 November 1439	c.15–24 February 1440		William Tresham	149	
13th	3 December 1441	1441/42	25 January 1442	27 March 1442		William Tresham	148	
14th	13 January 1445	1445	25 February 1445	9 April 1445		William Burley	147	
15th	14 December 1446	1446/47	10 February 1447	3 March 1447		William Tresham	146	
16th	2 January 1449	1449	12 February 1449	16 July 1449		Sir John Say	145	
17th	23 September 1449	1449	6 November 1449	c.5–8 June 1450		Sir John Popham	144	
17th	23 September 1449	1449	6 November 1449	c.5–8 June 1450		William Tresham	144	
18th	5 September 1450	1450	6 November 1450	c.24–31 May 1451		Sir Willian Oldhall	143	
19th	20 January 1453	1453	6 March 1453	c.16–21 April 1454		Thomas Thorpe	142	
19th	20 January 1453	1453	6 March 1453	c.16–21 April 1454		Sir Thomas Charlton	142	
20th	26 May 1455	1455	9 July 1455	12 March 1456		Sir John Wenlock	141	
21st	9 October 1459	1459	20 November 1459	20 December 1459		Sir Thomas Tresham	140	b
22nd	30 July 1460	1460	7 October 1460	c.4 March 1461		John Green	139	
23rd	15 October 1470	1470	26 November 1470	c. 11 April 1471	0-4-16	unknown	135	c

Note:-

- (a) 4th: Known as the Parliament of Bats.
- (b) 21st: Known as the Parliament of Devils.
- (c) 23rd: This Parliament was held during a period when King Henry VI was restored to the throne. It ended when King Edward IV deposed Henry for the second time.

== Parliaments of King Edward IV ==
No.	Summoned	Elected	Assembled	Dissolved	Duration	Presiding Officer¹	-Plt	Note
1st	23 May 1461	1461	4 November 1461	6 May 1462	0-6-2	James Strangeways	138	...
2nd	22 December 1462	1462/63	29 April 1463	28 March 1465	1-10-28	John Say	137	...
3rd	28 February 1467	1467	3 June 1467	7 June 1468	1-0-4	John Say	136	...
4th	19 August 1472	1472	6 October 1472	14 March 1475	2-5-8	William Alington	134	...
5th	20 November 1477	1477/78	16 January 1478	26 February 1478	0-1-10	William Alington	133	...
6th	15 November 1482	1482/83	20 January 1483	18 February 1483	0-0-30	John Wood	132	...

== Parliament of King Richard III ==
No.	Summoned	Elected	Assembled	Dissolved	Duration	Presiding Officer¹	-Plt	Note
1st	9 December 1483	1483/84	23 January 1484	20 February 1484	0-0-29	William Catesby	131	...

== Parliaments of King Henry VII ==
No.	Summoned	Elected	Assembled	Dissolved	Duration	Presiding Officer¹	-Plt	Note
1st	15 September 1485	1485	7 November 1485	c. 4 March 1486	0-3-24	Thomas Lovell	130	...
2nd	...	1487	9 November 1487	c. 18 December 1487	0-1-9	John Mordaunt	129	...
3rd	...	?1488/89	13 January 1489	27 February 1490	0-11-14	Thomas fitzWilliam	128	...
4th	12 August 1491	1491	17 October 1491	5 March 1492	0-4-16	Richard Empson	127	...
5th	15 September 1495	1495	14 October 1495	21–22 December 1495	0-2-7/8	Robert Drury	126	...
6th	20 November 1496	1496/97	16 January 1497	13 March 1497	0-1-25	Thomas Englefield	125	...
7th	...	?1503/04	25 January 1504	c. 1 April 1504	0-2-7	Edmund Dudley	124	...

== Parliaments of King Henry VIII ==
No.	Summoned	Elected	Assembled	Dissolved	Duration	Presiding Officer¹	-Plt	Note
1st	17 October 1509	1509/10	21 January 1510	23 February 1510	0-1-2	Thomas Englefield	123	...
2nd	28 November 1511	1511/12	4 February 1512	4 March 1514	2-1-0	Robert Sheffield	122	...
3rd	23 November 1514	1514/15	5 February 1515	22 December 1515	0-10-17	Thomas Neville	121	...
4th	...	1523	15 April 1523	13 August 1523	0-3-29	Thomas More	120	...
5th	9 August 1529	1529	3 November 1529	14 April 1536	6-5-11	Thomas Audley	119	a
5th	9 August 1529	1529	3 November 1529	14 April 1536	6-5-11	Humphrey Wingfield	119	a
5th	9 August 1529	1529	3 November 1529	14 April 1536	6-5-11	Richard Rich	119	a
6th	27 April 1536	1536	8 June 1536	18 July 1536	0-1-10	Richard Rich	118	...
7th	1 March 1539	1539	28 April 1539	24 July 1540	1-2-26	Nicholas Hare	117	...
8th	23 November 1541	1541/42	16 January 1542	28 March 1544	2-2-12	Thomas Moyle	116	...
9th	1 December 1544	1544/45	23 November 1545	31 January 1547	1-2-8	Thomas Moyle	115	...

Note:-

- (a) 5th: Known as the Reformation Parliament.

== Parliaments of King Edward VI ==
No.	Summoned	Elected	Assembled	Dissolved	Duration	Speaker	-Plt	Note
1st	2 August 1547	1547	4 November 1547	15 April 1552	4-5-11	Sir John Baker	114	...
2nd	5 January 1553	1553	1 March 1553	31 March 1553	0-1-0	James Dyer	113	...

== Parliaments of Queen Mary I ==
No.	Summoned	Elected	Assembled	Dissolved	Duration	Speaker	-Plt	Note
1st	14 August 1553	1553	5 October 1553	5 December 1553	0-2-0	Sir John Pollard	112	...
2nd	17 February 1554	1554	2 April 1554	3 May 1554	0-1-1	Robert Brooke	111	...
3rd	3 October 1554	1554	12 November 1554	16 January 1555	0-2-4	Clement Higham	110	...
4th	3 September 1555	1555	21 October 1555	9 December 1555	0-1-18	Sir John Pollard	109	...
5th	6 December 1557	1557/58	20 January 1558	17 November 1558	0-10-28	William Cordell	108	...

== Parliaments of Queen Elizabeth I ==
No.	Summoned	Elected	Assembled	Dissolved	Duration	Speaker	-Plt	Note
1st	5 December 1558	1558/59	23 January 1559	8 May 1559	0-3-15	Thomas Gargrave	107	...
2nd	10 November 1562	1562/63	11 January 1563	2 January 1567	3-11-21	Thomas Williams	106	...
2nd	10 November 1562	1562/63	11 January 1563	2 January 1567	3-11-21	Richard Onslow	106	...
3rd	...	1571	2 April 1571	29 May 1571	0-1-27	Christopher Wray	105	...
4th	28 March 1572	1572	8 May 1572	19 April 1583	10-11-11	Robert Bell	104	...
4th	28 March 1572	1572	8 May 1572	19 April 1583	10-11-11	John Popham	104	...
5th	12 October 1584	1584	23 November 1584	14 September 1585	0-8-22	John Puckering	103	...
6th	15 September 1586	1586	15 October 1586	23 March 1587	0-5-8	John Puckering	102	...
7th	18 September 1588	1588/89	4 February 1589	29 March 1589	0-1-25	Thomas Snagge	101	...
8th	4 January 1593	1593	18 February 1593	10 April 1593	0-1-22	Edward Coke	100	...
9th	23 August 1597	1597	24 October 1597	9 February 1598	0-3-16	Christopher Yelverton	99	...
10th	11 September 1601	1601	27 October 1601	19 December 1601	0-1-22	John Croke	98	...

== Parliaments of King James I ==
No.	Summoned	Elected	Assembled	Dissolved	Duration	Speaker	-Plt	Note
1st	31 January 1604	1604	19 March 1604	9 February 1611	6-10-21	Edward Phelips	97	...
2nd	...	?1614	5 April 1614	7 June 1614	0-2-2	Randolph Crewe	96	Addled Parliament
3rd	13 November 1620	1620/21	16 January 1621	8 February 1622	1-0-23	Thomas Richardson	95	...
4th	20 December 1623	1623/24	12 February 1624	27 March 1625	1-1-15	Thomas Crewe	94	Happy Parliament

== Parliaments of King Charles I ==
The Long Parliament, which commenced in this reign, had the longest term and the most complex history of any English Parliament. The entry in the first table below relates to the whole Parliament. Although it rebelled against King Charles I and continued to exist long after the King's death, it was a Parliament he originally summoned. An attempt has been made to set out the different phases of the Parliament in the second table in this section and in subsequent sections. The phases are indicated by a letter in the -Plt column (in the case of these phases they all share the same -Plt number, which is used in the first table of this section, so the column is available to set out the letter for the phases moving forward from 1640) and are explained in a note.

No.	Summoned	Elected	Assembled	Dissolved	Duration	Speaker	-Plt	Note
1st	2 April 1625	1625	17 May 1625	12 August 1625	0-2-26	Thomas Crewe	93	Useless Parliament
2nd	20 December 1625	1626	6 February 1626	15 June 1626	0-4-9	Heneage Finch	92	...
3rd	31 January 1628	1628	17 March 1628	10 March 1629	0-11-21	John Finch	91	...
4th	20 February 1640	1640	13 April 1640	5 May 1640	0-0-22	John Glanville	90	Short Parliament
5th	24 September 1640	1640	3 November 1640	16 March 1660	19-5-13	William Lenthall	89	Long Parliament (a)
5th	24 September 1640	1640	3 November 1640	16 March 1660	19-5-13	Henry Pelham	89	Long Parliament (a)
5th	24 September 1640	1640	3 November 1640	16 March 1660	19-5-13	William Lenthall	89	Long Parliament (a)
5th	24 September 1640	1640	3 November 1640	16 March 1660	19-5-13	William Say (Deputy)	89	Long Parliament (a)
5th	24 September 1640	1640	3 November 1640	16 March 1660	19-5-13	William Lenthall	89	Long Parliament (a)

Note:-

- (a) Speakers of the Long Parliament (including times when it sat as the Rump Parliament): Lenthall 3 November 1640 – 26 July 1647; Pelham 30 July 1647 – 5 August 1647; Lenthall 6 August 1647 – 20 April 1653 (restored to the chair by the Army and sat until Oliver Cromwell dissolved the Rump Parliament) and 26 December 1653 – 13 January 1660 (when the Rump was restored); Say 13 January 1660 – 21 January 1660 and Lenthall 21 January 1660 – 16 March 1660.

=== The Long Parliament (Royalist phases) ===
No.	Summoned	Elected	Assembled	Dissolved	Duration	Speaker	-Plt	Note
5th	24 September 1640	1640	3 November 1640	21 August 1642	...	William Lenthall	a	Long Parliament
5th	...	...	22 January 1644	10 March 1645	...	unknown	c	King's Oxford Parliament

Note:-

- (a) Phase 'a' of the Long Parliament was when it functioned as a conventional Parliament, requiring the assent of King Charles I to legislation. An unusual feature was that a law was enacted providing that this Parliament could not be lawfully dissolved without its own consent. This phase ended when the King raised his standard (22 August 1642) and commenced the English Civil War. The day before this event is the date inserted in the Dissolved column.
- (b) Phase 'c' of the Long Parliament was the King's Oxford Parliament. The King was unable to lawfully dissolve the Long Parliament, without its consent, so he summoned the members to meet at Oxford. Royalists and those interested in trying to settle the Civil War by compromise attended the meetings, which were in opposition to the revolutionary body (phase 'b' of the Long Parliament, see below) sitting concurrently at Westminster. The date of the first meeting is given in the Assembled column and of the last sitting in the Dissolved column.

== Parliaments of the Revolution and Commonwealth ==
No.	Summoned	Elected	Assembled	Dissolved	Duration	Speaker	-Plt	Note
1st	...	...	22 August 1642	5 December 1648	...	William Lenthall	b	Long Parliament (a)
1st	...	...	22 August 1642	5 December 1648	...	Henry Pelham	b	Long Parliament (a)
1st	...	...	22 August 1642	5 December 1648	...	William Lenthall	b	Long Parliament (a)
1st	...	...	6 December 1648	20 April 1653	...	William Lenthall	d	Rump Parliament (b)
2nd	20 June 1653	n/a	4 July 1653	12 December 1653	0-5-08	Francis Rous	88	Barebones Parliament (c)

Note:-

- (a) This was phase 'b' of the Long Parliament, when it functioned as a revolutionary Parliament, after the start of the English Civil War. Parliament assumed the power to legislate by Ordinance, without needing Royal assent. This phase ended with Pride's Purge, which converted the Long Parliament into the Rump Parliament. In 1644 the King summoned the Long Parliament to meet at Oxford. Those members who responded constituted the King's Oxford Parliament (phase c of the Parliament, see the previous section), in opposition to the revolutionary Parliament which continued to sit at the Palace of Westminster. The date in the Assembled column is the day when King Charles I raised his standard and commenced the English Civil War. The date in the Dissolved column is the day before Pride's Purge, when the full Long Parliament last met (until the Purge was reversed on 21 February 1660).
- (b) This was phase 'd' of the Long Parliament, known as the Rump Parliament. During this period the Army only permitted selected members to continue to participate. The House of Lords was abolished (6 February 1649) as was the monarchy (7 February 1649). Thereafter the Rump of the House of Commons was the only remaining element of Parliament. It legislated the Commonwealth of England into existence on 19 May 1649. The date of Pride's Purge is given in the Assembled column and the date when Oliver Cromwell dissolved the Rump by force is in the Dissolved column.
- (c) The Little or Barebones Parliament was an appointed body.

== Parliaments of the Protectorate ==
No.	Summoned	Elected	Assembled	Dissolved	Duration	Speaker	-Plt	Note
1st	1 June 1654	1654	3 September 1654	22 January 1655	0-4-19	William Lenthall	87	First Prot. Plt
2nd	10 July 1656	1656	17 September 1656	4 February 1658	1-4-18	Thomas Widdrington	86	Second Prot. Plt
2nd	10 July 1656	1656	17 September 1656	4 February 1658	1-4-18	Bulstrode Whitelocke	86	Second Prot. Plt
3rd	9 December 1658	1658/59	27 January 1659	22 April 1659	0-2-26	Chaloner Chute	85	Third Prot. Plt
3rd	9 December 1658	1658/59	27 January 1659	22 April 1659	0-2-26	Lislebone Long (Deputy)	85	Third Prot. Plt
3rd	9 December 1658	1658/59	27 January 1659	22 April 1659	0-2-26	Thomas Bampfylde	85	Third Prot. Plt

These parliaments included representatives of Scotland and Ireland.

No.	Summoned	Elected	Assembled	Dissolved	Duration	Speaker	-Plt	Note
4th	...	...	7 May 1659	13 October 1659	...	William Lenthall	e	Rump Plt (restored) (a)

Note:-

- (a) This was phase 'e' of the Long Parliament. The Army restored the Rump Parliament, to liquidate the Protectorate and re-establish the Commonwealth regime.

== Parliaments of the Commonwealth ==
No.	Summoned	Elected	Assembled	Dissolved	Duration	Speaker	-Plt	Note
1st	...	...	26 December 1659	20 February 1660	...	William Lenthall	f	Rump Parliament (a)
1st	...	...	26 December 1659	20 February 1660	...	William Say (Deputy)	f	Rump Parliament (a)
1st	...	...	26 December 1659	20 February 1660	...	William Lenthall	f	Rump Parliament (a)
1st	...	...	21 February 1660	16 March 1660	...	William Lenthall	g	Long Parliament (b)
2nd	16 March 1660	1660	25 April 1660	29 December 1660	0-8-4	Harbottle Grimston	84	Convention Parliament (c)

Note:-

- (a) This was phase 'f' of the Long Parliament, with the Rump Parliament running the restored Commonwealth regime.
- (b) This was phase 'g' of the Long Parliament. Pride's Purge was reversed and the full Long Parliament made arrangements for a Convention Parliament and then dissolved itself.
- (c) This was a Convention Parliament which restored the monarchy by recognising King Charles II as the rightful King.

== List of Parliaments: 1660 back to 1364 ==
Preliminary note: The English civil year started on 25 March until 1752 (Scotland having changed to 1 January in 1600). The years used in this article have been converted to the new style where necessary. Old style dates would be a year earlier than the new style for days between 1 January and 24 March. No attempt has been made to compensate for the eleven days which did not occur in September 1752 in both England and Scotland, when the day after 2 September was 14 September), so as to bring the dating in Great Britain and its associated territories fully into line with the Gregorian calendar.

=== Parliaments 1504-1660 ===
No	NP	Summoned	Opened	Dismissed	Duration	Notes
84	CP/6	16 March 1660	25 April 1660	29 December 1660	0-8-4	a,b
89d	CP/5b	...	21 February 1660	16 March 1660	(0-0-24)	c
89c	CP/5a	...	7 May 1659	20 February 1660	(0-9-13)	d
85	CP/4	9 December 1658	27 January 1659	22 April 1659	0-2-26	e
86	CP/3	10 July 1656	17 September 1656	4 February 1658	1-4-18	f
87	CP/2	1 June 1654	3 September 1654	22 January 1655	0-4-19	g
88	CP/1	20 June 1653	4 July 1653	12 December 1653	0-5-08	h
89b	KC1/5b	...	22 January 1644	8 October 1644	(0-8-16)	i,j
89a	KC1/5a	24 September 1640	3 November 1640	20 April 1653	(12-5-17)	k
90	KC1/4	20 February 1640	13 April 1640	5 May 1640	0-0-22	...
91	KC1/3	31 January 1628	17 March 1628	10 March 1629	0-11-21	...
92	KC1/2	20 December 1625	6 February 1626	15 June 1626	0-4-9	...
93	KC1/1	2 April 1625	17 May 1625	12 August 1625	0-2-26	...
94	KJ1/4	20 December 1623	12 February 1624	27 March 1625	1-1-15	l
95	KJ1/3	13 November 1620	16 January 1621	8 February 1622	1-0-23	...
96	KJ1/2	...	5 April 1614	7 June 1614	0-2-2	...
97	KJ1/1	31 January 1604	19 March 1604	9 February 1611	6-10-21	...
98	QE1/10	11 September 1601	27 October 1601	19 December 1601	0-1-22	m
99	QE1/9	23 August 1597	24 October 1597	9 February 1598	0-3-16	...
100	QE1/8	4 January 1593	18 February 1593	10 April 1593	0-1-22	...
101	QE1/7	18 September 1588	4 February 1589	29 March 1589	0-1-25	...
102	QE1/6	15 September 1586	15 October 1586	23 March 1587	0-5-8	...
103	QE1/5	12 October 1584	23 November 1584	14 September 1585	0-8-22	...
104	QE1/4	28 March 1572	8 May 1572	19 April 1583	10-11-11	...
105	QE1/3	...	2 April 1571	29 May 1571	0-1-27	...
106	QE1/2	10 November 1562	11 January 1563	2 January 1567	3-11-21	...
107	QE1/1	5 December 1558	23 January 1559	8 May 1559	0-3-15	...
108	QM1/5	6 December 1557	20 January 1558	17 November 1558	0-10-28	n
109	QM1/4	3 September 1555	21 October 1555	9 December 1555	0-1-18	...
110	QM1/3	3 October 1554	12 November 1554	16 January 1555	0-2-4	...
111	QM1/2	17 February 1554	2 April 1554	3 May 1554	0-1-1	...
112	QM1/1	14 August 1553	5 October 1553	5 December 1553	0-2-0	...
113	KE6/2	5 January 1553	1 March 1553	31 March 1553	0-1-0	o
114	KE6/1	2 August 1547	4 November 1547	15 April 1552	4-5-11	...
115	KH8/9	1 December 1544	23 November 1545	31 January 1547	1-2-8	p
116	KH8/8	23 November 1541	16 January 1542	28 March 1544	2-2-12	...
117	KH8/7	1 March 1539	28 April 1539	24 July 1540	1-2-26	...
118	KH8/6	27 April 1536	8 June 1536	18 July 1536	0-1-10	...
119	KH8/5	9 August 1529	3 November 1529	14 April 1536	6-5-11	...
120	KH8/4	...	15 April 1523	13 August 1523	0-3-29	...
121	KH8/3	23 November 1514	5 February 1515	22 December 1515	0-10-17	...
122	KH8/2	28 November 1511	4 February 1512	4 March 1514	2-1-0	...
123	KH8/1	17 October 1509	21 January 1510	23 February 1510	0-1-2	...
124	KH7/7	...	25 January 1504	c. 1 April 1504	0-2-7	q

Notes: -

- (a) CP - Parliament summoned by the Commonwealth or Protectorate regimes.
- (b) This was the Convention Parliament, which restored the monarchy by recognising King Charles II of England as the lawful sovereign.
- (c) This was the last phase of the Long Parliament, between the reversal of Pride's Purge and the final dissolution of the Parliament.
- (d) This was a phase of the Long Parliament, between the restoration of the Rump and the reversal of Pride's Purge. On 13 October 1659 it ceased to be a Protectorate legislature. From 26 December 1659 it functioned as a Commonwealth legislature.
- (e) This was the Third Protectorate Parliament.
- (f) This was the Second Protectorate Parliament.
- (g) This was the First Protectorate Parliament.
- (h) This was the Little or Barebones Parliament, an appointed assembly not an elected Parliament.
- (i) KC1 - Parliament summoned by King Charles I of England.
- (j) This was the King's Oxford Parliament, held at Oxford in opposition to the Long Parliament sitting at Westminster. It consisted of Royalist members of the Long Parliament.
- (k) This was the first phase of the Long Parliament. Under legislation enacted before the English Civil War this Parliament could not lawfully be dissolved without its consent. This phase of the Parliament was ended when Oliver Cromwell and his troops prevented the Parliament from continuing to sit. All phases of the Long Parliament and the King's Oxford Parliament, being sittings of all or part of the same body are given the same number in the No column.
- (l) KJ1 - Parliament summoned by King James I.
- (m) QE1 - Parliament summoned by Queen Elizabeth I.
- (n) QM1 - Parliament summoned by Queen Mary I.
- (o) KE6 - Parliament summoned by King Edward VI.
- (p) KH8 - Parliament summoned by King Henry VIII.
- (q) KH7 - Parliament summoned by King Henry VII.

=== Parliaments 1400-1497 ===
No	NP	Summoned	Opened	Dismissed	Duration	Notes
125	KH7/6	20 November 1496	16 January 1497	13 March 1497	0-1-25	...
126	KH7/5	15 September 1495	14 October 1495	21–22 December 1495	0-2-7/8	...
127	KH7/4	12 August 1491	17 October 1491	5 March 1492	0-4-16	...
128	KH7/3	...	13 January 1489	27 February 1490	0-11-14	...
129	KH7/2	...	9 November 1487	c. 18 December 1487	0-1-9	...
130	KH7/1	15 September 1485	7 November 1485	c. 4 March 1486	0-3-24	...
131	KR3/1	9 December 1483	23 January 1484	20 February 1484	0-0-29	a
132	KE4/6	15 November 1482	20 January 1483	18 February 1483	0-0-30	b
133	KE4/5	20 November 1477	16 January 1478	26 February 1478	0-1-10	...
134	KE4/4	19 August 1472	6 October 1472	14 March 1475	2-5-8	c
135	KH6/23	15 October 1470	26 November 1470	c. 11 April 1471	0-4-16	d
136	KE4/3	28 February 1467	3 June 1467	7 June 1468	1-0-4	...
137	KE4/2	22 December 1462	29 April 1463	28 March 1465	1-10-28	...
138	KE4/1	23 May 1461	4 November 1462	6 May 1462	0-6-2	...
139	KH6/22	30 July 1460	7 October 1460	c. 4 March 1461	0-4-26	e
140	KH6/21	9 October 1459	20 November 1459	20 December 1459	0-1-0	...
141	KH6/20	26 May 1455	9 July 1455	12 March 1456	0-8-3	...
142	KH6/19	20 January 1453	6 March 1453	c. 16–21 April 1454	1-1-10/15	...
143	KH6/18	5 September 1450	6 November 1450	c. 24–31 May 1451	0-6-18/25	...
144	KH6/17	23 September 1449	6 November 1449	c. 5–8 June 1450	0-6/7-30/2	...
145	KH6/16	2 January 1449	12 February 1449	16 July 1449	0-5-4	...
146	KH6/15	14 December 1446	10 February 1447	3 March 1447	0-0-22	...
147	KH6/14	13 January 1445	25 February 1445	9 April 1445	0-1-15	...
148	KH6/13	3 December 1441	25 January 1442	27 March 1442	0-2-2	...
149	KH6/12	26 September 1439	12 November 1439	c. 15–24 February 1440	0-3-3/12	...
150	KH6/11	29 October 1436	21 January 1437	27 March 1437	0-2-6	...
151	KH6/10	5 July 1435	10 October 1435	23 December 1435	0-2-13	f
152	KH6/9	24 May 1433	8 July 1433	pc. 18 December 1433	0-5-10	g
153	KH6/8	25 February 1432	12 May 1432	17 July 1432	0-2-5	...
154	KH6/7	27 November 1430	12 January 1431	20 March 1431	0-2-8	f
155	KH6/6	12 July 1429	22 September 1429	23 February 1430	0-5-1	...
156	KH6/5	15 July 1427	13 October 1427	25 March 1428	0-5-12	...
157	KH6/4	7 January 1426	18 February 1426	1 June 1426	0-3-14	...
158	KH6/3	24 February 1425	30 April 1425	14 July 1425	0-2-14	...
159	KH6/2	1 September 1423	20 October 1423	28 February 1424	0-4-8	...
160	KH6/1	29 September 1422	9 November 1422	18 December 1422	0-1-9	...
161	KH5/11	20 October 1421	1 December 1421	...	...	h
162	KH5/10	26 February 1421	2 May 1421	...	...	...
163	KH5/9	21 October 1420	2 December 1420	...	...	...
164	KH5/8	24 August 1419	16 October 1419	13 November 1419	0-0-29	f
165	KH5/7	5 October 1417	16 November 1417	17 December 1417	0-1-1	f
166	KH5/6	3 September 1416	19 October 1416	18 November 1416	0-0-31	...
167	KH5/5	21 January 1416	16 March 1416	May 1416	...	...
168	KH5/4	12 August 1415	4 November 1415	12 November 1415	0-0-9	f
169	KH5/3	26 September 1414	19 November 1414	...	...	...
170	KH5/2	1 December 1413	30 April 1414	29 May 1414	0-0-30	...
171	KH5/1	22 March 1413	14 May 1413	9 June 1413	0-0-27	...
172	KH4/10	1 December 1412	3 February 1413	20 March 1413	0-1-17	i
173	KH4/9	21 September 1411	3 November 1411	19 December 1411	0-1-16	...
174	KH4/8	26 October 1409	27 January 1410	9 May 1410	0-3-12	...
175	KH4/7	26 August 1407	20 October 1407	2 December 1407	0-1-12	...
176	KH4/6	21 December 1405	1 March 1406	22 December 1406	0-9-21	...
177	KH4/5	25 August 1404	6 October 1404	13 November 1404	0-1-7	j
178	KH4/4	20 October 1403	14 January 1404	20 March 1404	0-2-6	j
179	KH4/3	19 June 1402	30 September 1402	25 November 1402	0-1-26	...
180	KH4/2	9 September 1400	20 January 1401	10 March 1401	0-1-18	...

Notes:-

- (a) KR3 - Parliament summoned by King Richard III of England.
- (b) KE4 - Parliament summoned by King Edward IV.
- (c) King Edward IV restored to the throne since the previous Parliament.
- (d) KH6 - Parliament summoned by King Henry VI of England. KH6/23: King Henry VI restored to the throne since the previous Parliament. Parliament dissolved by the deposition of the monarch.
- (e) Parliament dissolved by the deposition of the monarch.
- (f) Date given for dismissal is the date when supply was granted.
- (g) The actual date of dismissal was post circa the date given, so the duration is a minimum estimate.
- (h) KH5 - Parliament summoned by King Henry V of England.
- (i) KH4 - Parliament summoned by King Henry IV of England.
- (j) Date given for dismissal is the date when writs 'de expensis' were issued.

=== Parliaments to 1399 ===
No	NP	Summoned	Opened	Dismissed	Duration	Notes
181	KH4/1	30 September 1399	6 October 1399	19 November 1399	0-1-13	(Note: Date given for dismissal is the date when writs 'de expensis' were issued.) (Note: Convention Parliament.)
182	KR2/25	19 August 1399	30 September 1399	30 September 1399	0-0-1	(Note: KR2: a parliament summoned by King Richard II of England.) (Note: Summons held to be invalidated by the deposition of King Richard II on 29 September 1399.)
183	KR2/24	18 July 1397	17 September 1397	31 January 1398	0-4-14	
184	KR2/23	30 November 1396	22 January 1397	12 February 1397	0-0-22	
185	KR2/22	20 November 1394	27 January 1395	15 February 1395	0-0-20	
186	KR2/21	13 November 1393	27 January 1394	6 March 1394	0-1-7	
187	KR2/20	23 November 1392	20 January 1393	10 February 1393	0-0-22	
188	KR2/19	7 September 1391	3 November 1391	2 December 1391	0-0-30	
189	KR2/18	12 September 1390	12 November 1390	3 December 1390	0-0-22	
190	KR2/17	6 December 1389	17 January 1390	2 March 1390	0-1-13	
191	KR2/16	28 July 1388	9 September 1388	17 October 1388	0-1-8	
192	KR2/15	17 December 1387	3 February 1388	4 June 1388	0-4-1	
193	KR2/14	8 August 1386	1 October 1386	28 November 1386	0-1-27	
194	KR2/13	3 September 1385	20 October 1385	6 December 1385	0-1-16	
195	KR2/12	28 September 1384	12 November 1384	14 December 1384	0-1-2	
196	KR2/11	3 March 1384	29 April 1384	27 May 1384	0-0-29	
197	KR2/10	20 August 1383	26 October 1383	26 November 1383	0-1-0	
198	KR2/9	7 January 1383	23 February 1383	10 March 1383	0-0-16	
199	KR2/8	9 August 1382	6 October 1382	24 October 1382	0-0-19	
200	KR2/7	24 March 1382	7 May 1382	22 May 1382	0-0-16	
201	KR2/6	16 July 1381	3 November 1381	25 February 1382	0-3-22	
202	KR2/5	26 August 1380	5 November 1380	6 December 1380	0-1-1	
203	KR2/4	20 October 1379	16 January 1380	3 March 1380	0-1-16	
204	KR2/3	16 February 1379	24 April 1379	27 May 1379	0-1-3	
205	KR2/2	3 September 1378	20 October 1378	16 November 1378	0-0-28	
206	KR2/1	4 August 1377	13 October 1377	5 December 1377	0-1-23	
207	KE3/47	1 December 1376	27 January 1377	2 March 1377	0-1-3	(Note: KE3: a parliament summoned by King Edward III of England.) (Note: Known as the Bad Parliament.)
208	KE3/46	28 December 1375	28 April 1376	10 July 1376	0-2-13	(Note: Known as the Good Parliament.)
209	KE3/45	4 October 1373	21 November 1373	10 December 1373	0-0-20	
210	KE3/44	1 September 1372	3 November 1372	24 November 1372	0-0-21	
211	KE3/43	8 January 1371	24 February 1371	29 March 1371	0-1-5	
212	KE3/42	6 April 1369	3 June 1369	11 June 1369	0-0-9	
213	KE3/41	24 February 1368	1 May 1368	21 May 1368	0-0-21	
214	KE3/40	20 January 1366	4 May 1366	11 May 1366	0-0-8	
215	KE3/39	4 December 1364	20 January 1365	17 February 1365	0-0-28	

== See also ==
- Duration of English, British and United Kingdom parliaments from 1660
- List of parliaments of England
- List of acts of the Parliament of England
- List of parliaments of Great Britain
- List of parliaments of the United Kingdom
- List of speakers of the House of Commons of England
- List of speakers of the British House of Commons
- List of British governments
