= Charles Bonython =

English lawyer and Tory member of parliament

Charles Bonython (c.1653 – 30 April 1705) was an English lawyer and Tory politician.

Bonython was born in Cornwall, the son of John Bonython of Bonython Manor and Anne Trevanion. He entered Gray's Inn in 1671 and was called to the bar in 1678. In 1680 he represented the crown against Roger Palmer, 1st Earl of Castlemaine and he was involved in prosecuting other cases related to the Popish Plot. In 1683 he succeeded Francis Wythens steward of the courts of Westminster, which had an income of £500 per year. In 1685, Bonython was returned as a Tory member of parliament for Westminster alongside Michael Arnold in an uncontested election. According to The History of Parliament, he was a moderately active member of the Loyal Parliament and was appointed to eight committees.

Bonython was superseded as steward of Westminster in February 1687 owing to his opposition to the repeal of the Test Acts 1673 & 1678 and the Penal Laws, but he was restored in the following year. He was a candidate for the Westminster seat in the 1689 general election, but was made to desist in favour of the court-aligned Tory William Pulteney. He was again desisted from standing as the Tory candidate in November 1691 and in 1698. He stood in the January 1701 English general election, but came bottom of the poll. From 1683 he was a justice of the peace for Westminster and from 1692 he was a serjeant-at-law.

He committed suicide by shooting himself on 30 April 1705. His eldest son, Richard, also committed suicide by throwing himself out of a window after setting fire to his rooms in 1720.

Parliament of England
Preceded by William Waller; William Pulteney	Member of Parliament for Westminster with Michael Arnold; 1685–1687	Succeeded by William Pulteney; Philip Howard
