= Richard Waldegrave =

Richard Waldegrave may refer to:

- Sir Richard Waldegrave (politician) (died 1410), British politician, Speaker of the English House of Commons
- Sir Richard Waldegrave (soldier) (died 1436), British military officer, son of the above
