= Michael Arnold (MP) =

English brewer and Tory member of parliament

Michael Arnold (died 1690) was an English brewer and Tory politician.

Arnold was the eldest son of Michael Arnold and Mary Guillim. He inherited his grandfather's brewery in Westminster. In 1665 he was nominated to become a tax farmer by the Worshipful Company of Brewers, but he withdrew from the scheme the following year having sustained serious financial losses owing to the Great Plague of London and the economic dislocation of the Second Anglo-Dutch War. Between 1674 and July 1688 he was appointed Brewer to the King by the Board of Green Cloth.

In 1685, Arnold was returned as a Tory member of parliament for Westminster alongside Charles Bonython in an uncontested election. According to The History of Parliament, he was a moderately active member of the Loyal Parliament and was appointed to five committees.

In June 1688, he was appointed to the jury in the trial of the Seven Bishops. Arnold was the last member of the jury to agree to an acquittal of the bishops, likely influenced by his concern for his job in the royal court. He allegedly remarked: "Whatever I do, I am sure to be half ruined. If I say not guilty, I shall brew no more for the King, and if I say guilty, I shall brew no more for anybody else". He was removed from his position as Brewer to the King the following month.

He died in August 1690 and was buried in St Margaret's, Westminster.

Parliament of England
Preceded by William Waller; William Pulteney	Member of Parliament for Westminster with Charles Bonython; 1685–1687	Succeeded by William Pulteney; Philip Howard
