= William Pulteney =

William Pulteney may refer to:

- William Pulteney (1624–1691), English MP for Westminster
- William Pulteney, 1st Earl of Bath (1684–1764), British MP for Hedon and Middlesex, Cofferer of the Household
- William Pulteney, Viscount Pulteney (1731–1763), his son, British MP for Old Sarum and Westminster, Lord of the Bedchamber
- Sir William Pulteney, 5th Baronet (1729–1805), Scottish lawyer, MP for Cromarty and Shrewsbury
- William Pulteney (British Army officer) (1861–1941), British general during the First World War
