= William Pulteney (Westminster MP, born 1624) =

English Member of Parliament

Sir William Pulteney

Member of Parliament for Westminster
- In office 1689–1691
- Preceded by: Charles Bonython
- Succeeded by: Stephen Fox
- In office 1679–1685
- Preceded by: Richard Everard
- Succeeded by: Michael Arnold

Personal details
- Born: 25 March 1624
- Died: 6 September 1691 (aged 67) Isleworth, London, England
- Party: Whig
- Other political affiliations: Tory
- Spouse: Grace Corbet (m. 1655)
- Children: 3, including John
- Education: King's College, Cambridge

Sir William Pulteney (25 March 1624 – 6 September 1691) was an English lawyer and politician who was the Member of Parliament for Westminster. Initially a Tory, Pulteney later became associated with Whig politics owing to his adherence to the political interests of William III of England. He was an ancestor of the Pulteney Earls of Bath.

== Early life ==
Arms of Pulteney: Argent, a fess dancettée gules in chief three leopard's faces sable

Pulteney was the second son of Michael Pulteney and his wife Eleanor. He was educated at King's College, Cambridge from 1640. He served as a captain of foot in the Royalist army during the English Civil War until 1646. Pulteney then trained in law, entering the Inner Temple in 1647 and being called to the bar in 1654. He succeeded to his father's estates following the death of his elder brother in 1655. The core of his wealth derived from crown leases in the bailiwick of St James on which his family had capitalised since the late 16th-century, which had an income of £10,000 per year. On 4 June 1660, five days after the Stuart Restoration, Pulteney was knighted by Charles II of England in recognition of his loyalty during the civil war. He was nominated a bencher of the Inner Temple in 1671 and a reader in 1676.

== Political career ==
In March 1679, Pulteney was elected to the House of Commons of England as a Member of Parliament for Westminster. He was initially a supporter of the Court Party, but during the Exclusion Crisis he became a determined Exclusionist, speaking out on the constitutional evils of a Roman Catholic monarchy. In the Commons, he was closely associated with Thomas Clarges, who also opposed the succession of James, Duke of York. He was replaced in Westminster by the more overtly Tory politicians Charles Bonython and Michael Arnold during the Loyal Parliament following James II's accession, but was returned as the MP to the Convention Parliament in 1689. While nominally a Tory, in parliament Pulteney took a Whiggish position in debates about the crown, such as defending the efficacy of Parliament’s intervention in the Glorious Revolution. He was also supportive of Parliament's new-forged authority in government finance.

In February 1690, Pulteney was appointed one of three commissioners of the Privy Seal of England. He was returned as the MP for Westminster to the 2nd Parliament of William III and Mary II following an election in which he received support from Thomas Tenison and other members of the London clergy. At the outset of the new parliament, Thomas Osborne recorded Pulteney as being a Tory and he was observed to be one of a small band of "managers of the King’s directions" (i.e. those aligned with the king's interests) a few months later.

In the spring of 1691, Pulteney was proposed as a judge for the Court of Common Pleas, but the signing of a royal warrant for the appointment was blocked owing to Daniel Finch, 2nd Earl of Nottingham's preference for another candidate. Before a final decision could be made regarding his appointment to the judicial bench, Pulteney died suddenly on 6 September at his house in Isleworth.

== Personal life ==
On 23 April 1655, Pulteney married Grace, a daughter of Sir John Corbet, 1st Baronet, of Stoke upon Tern. Their children included:

- Colonel William Pulteney (died 1715), father of William Pulteney, 1st Earl of Bath and Harry Pulteney
- John Pulteney (died 1726), father of Daniel Pulteney and grandfather of Laura Pulteney, 1st Countess of Bath
- Anne Pulteney (died 1746), who married Charles FitzRoy, 2nd Duke of Cleveland; their great-grandson William Vane, 1st Duke of Cleveland was the eventual heir to the Pulteney estates in Bath.

Parliament of England
Preceded by Philip Warwick; Richard Everard	Member of Parliament for Westminster with Stephen Fox (1679); Francis Wythens (1679–1680); William Waller (1680–1685); 1679–1685	Succeeded by Charles Bonython; Michael Arnold
Preceded by Charles Bonython; Michael Arnold	Member of Parliament for Westminster with Philip Howard (1689–1690); Walter Clarges (1690–1691); 1689–1691	Succeeded by Stephen Fox; Walter Clarges
