= Seven Bishops =

English bishops tried for seditious libel in 1688

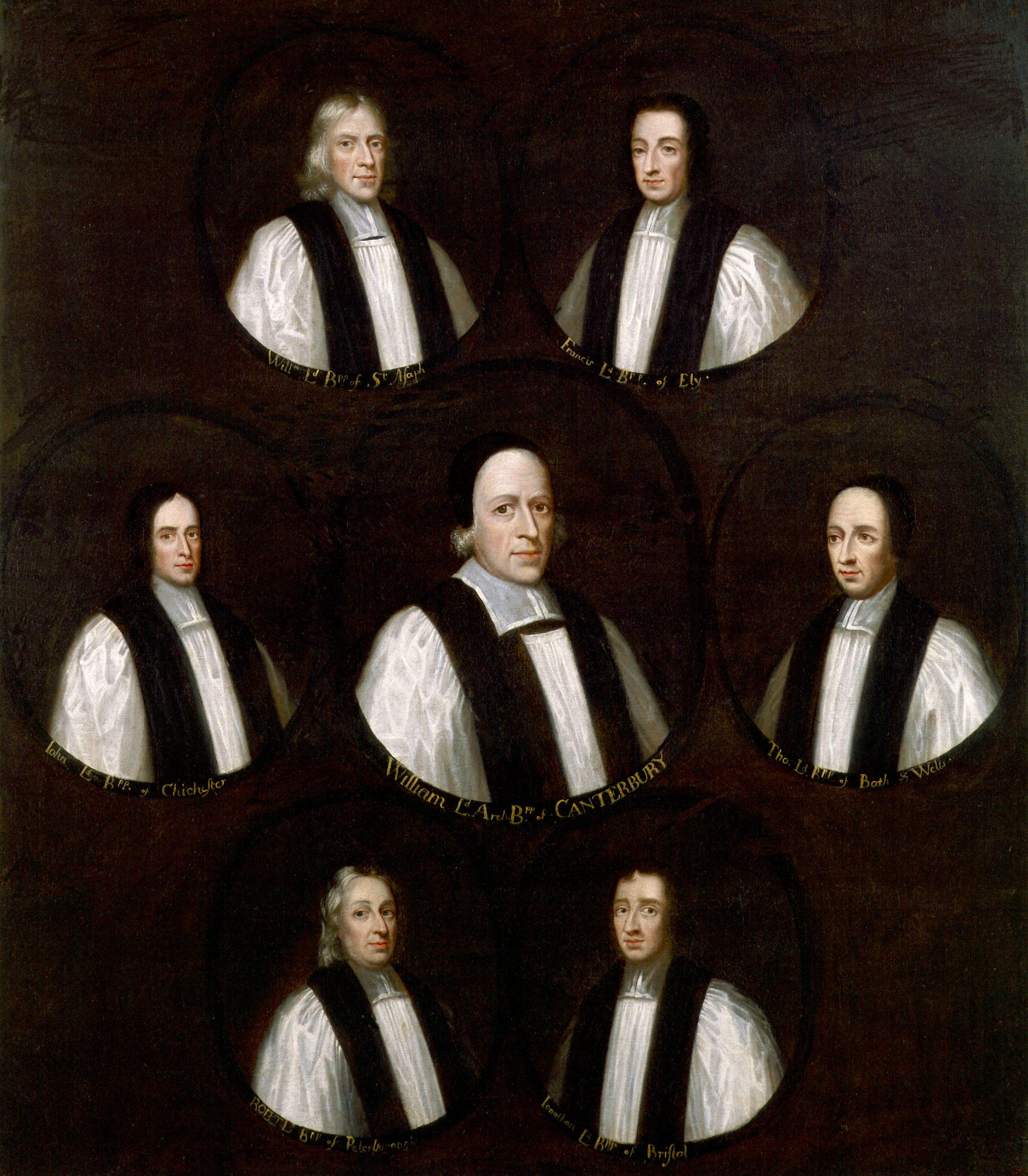
The Seven Bishops

The Seven Bishops were members of the Church of England tried and acquitted for seditious libel in the Court of King's Bench in June 1688. The very unpopular prosecution of the bishops is viewed as a significant event contributing to the November 1688 Glorious Revolution and deposition of James II.

In November 1685, James II dismissed the Parliament of England for refusing to pass measures removing legal restrictions on Catholics and Protestant Nonconformists. In August 1686, the Parliament of Scotland suffered the same fate and neither body met again until 1689. James nevertheless imposed the measures in April 1687 though a royal Declaration of Indulgence which was widely opposed in both countries, including by Nonconformists who feared this would jeopardise their hopes of readmission to the Church of England.

The Declaration was reissued in April 1688, and James ordered the English bishops to have it read in every church. The seven signed a petition to be excused from this duty, arguing it relied on an interpretation of Royal authority declared illegal by Parliament. After the petition was printed and publicly distributed, the bishops were charged with seditious libel and held in the Tower of London. They were tried and found not guilty on 30 June.

Most Protestants had been willing to tolerate James' personal Catholicism, since he seemed unlikely to produce more children and the heir was his Protestant daughter Mary II of England. The unexpected birth of his son James Francis Edward on 10 June meant the prospect of a Catholic dynasty, and the indictment of the bishops seen as part of a wider attack on the Church of England. The trial led to anti-Catholic riots throughout England and Scotland and ultimately the deposition of James in November 1688, although five of the seven bishops were subsequently removed from office for refusing to swear allegiance to his successors.

== Background ==
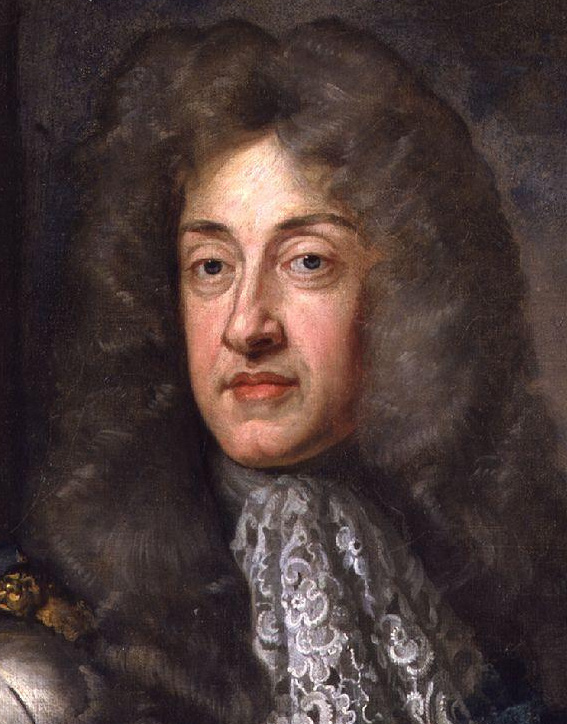
James II; attempts to impose the Declaration of Indulgence destroyed his support base

Despite his Catholicism, James II became king in February 1685 with widespread support in all three kingdoms, resulting in the rapid defeat of the 1685 Monmouth Rebellion in England and Argyll's Rising in Scotland. Less than four years later, he was forced into exile; although religious toleration was the ostensible issue, historians generally view it as the continuation of a century-long struggle for control between Crown and Parliament, which included the 1638–1651 Wars of the Three Kingdoms. His measures for the relief of Catholics were inopportune: after the October 1685 Edict of Fontainebleau revoked tolerance for French Protestant Huguenots, over 200,000–400,000 went into exile, 40,000 settling in London. The killing of 2,000 Vaudois Protestants in 1686 and French territorial expansion under Louis XIV reinforced fears that Protestant Europe was threatened by a Catholic counter-reformation.

There were two elements of the religious penal laws, the first being the right to private worship. In practice, this was already tolerated and indulgences were issued on a regular basis, largely because the numbers were insignificant; in 1680, Catholics comprised less than 1% of the English population, while Protestant Nonconformists formed about 4%. The second was the Test Act which required all public officials to subscribe to the beliefs of the Church of England. Many were willing to allow private worship but viewed the Test Act as essential since the royal prerogative could exempt individuals from certain laws, but also be withdrawn at will, unlike an Act of Parliament.

== Sequence of events ==
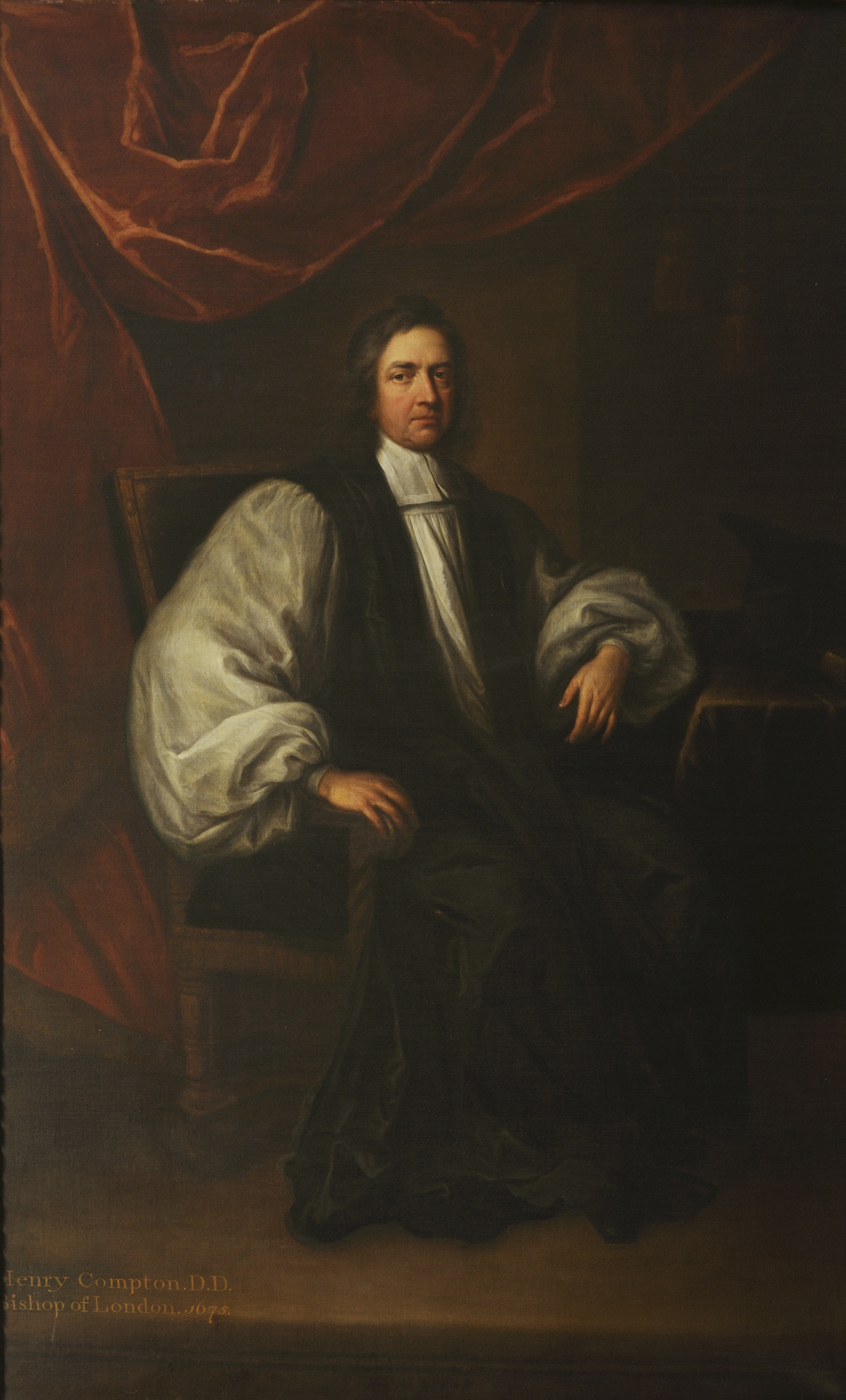
Henry Compton, Bishop of London; already suspended by James, he was not one of the Seven but played a significant role in the petition

The Declaration of Indulgence was issued in Scotland on 12 February 1687, then in England on 4 April. Many disliked it but did not actively oppose it, although the political implications caused considerable debate. As king, James himself was not subject to the Test Act and could also 'dispense' or exempt individuals. Although only intended for exceptional cases, it was widely used by James to appoint Catholics to senior positions in the army and government; after dismissing those judges who opposed his interpretation, he obtained a legal ruling in 1686 in his favour. Few challenged a long-standing principle established during the Tudor period, but in a society that feared instability and relied on the law to ensure against it, his approach caused resentment and unease. This was true even for those who benefitted, such as the Nonconformist Sir John Shorter, nominated by James for Lord Mayor of London in 1687. Before taking office, he insisted on complying with the Test Act, reportedly due to a "distrust of the King's favour ... thus encouraging that which His Majesties whole Endeavours were intended to disannull".

The Declaration also effectively abolished an Act, a right reserved for Parliament and reconfirmed in 1663 and 1673 by the Cavalier Parliament. In addition, even if James was above the law, his subjects were not; they were being ordered to ignore the law and their oaths of office, making them guilty of perjury, then considered both a crime and a sin. The implications led to intensive debate, one of the most powerful opponents being the London priest William Sherlock. The Declaration was republished in April 1688 and on 4 May James ordered it to be read in every church, starting in London on 20 and 27 May, then 3 and 10 June elsewhere. The objective was to force the Church of England to publicly back the suspension of the Test Act.

In a series of meetings, the London clergy overwhelmingly voted against compliance. On 13 May, William Sancroft, Archbishop of Canterbury and seven other bishops, including Henry Compton, Francis Turner, Thomas White, Thomas Ken, John Lake, Jonathan Trelawny and William Lloyd resolved to defy James's order. While not present, the Bishop of Winchester, Gloucester and Norwich were said to have approved this course of action. Compton had already been suspended for refusing to ban John Sharp from preaching after he gave an anti-Catholic sermon. The other seven signed a petition requesting they be excused, referencing the Parliamentary decisions of 1663 and 1673.

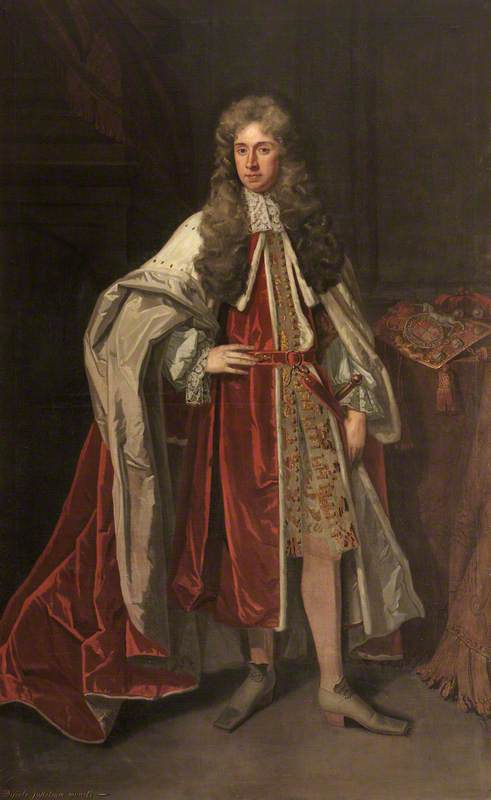
Lord Jeffreys, the Lord Chancellor, who urged James not to prosecute

James received it on 18 May and reacted with his customary fury to being opposed; calling it "a standard of rebellion", he dismissed them, saying he expected to be obeyed. Within hours, copies of the petition were being sold on the streets of London; Compton was alleged to be the instigator. On 20 May, only seven churches in London read the Declaration, the congregation walking out in at least three of them; none of them read it out on the 27th. In the country as a whole, only 200 out of 9,000 did so; even worse from James' perspective, many Nonconformists supported the decision of their Church of England colleagues not to comply.

Senior government advisors like the Earl of Melfort, a Scottish Catholic convert, argued publication of the bishops' petition constituted seditious libel and urged James to put the bishops on trial. The Ecclesiastical Commission of 1686, set up to enforce discipline on Church of England clergy, refused to take the case, while Lord Jeffreys recommended against prosecution; overruled, he asked if James would listen to his ministers or whether "the Virgin Mary is to do all". James instructed the bishops to appear before him on 8 June to explain their actions; they did so but refused to answer, arguing that "no Subject was bound to accuse himself" and were ordered to appear in court on the 15th. When asked to provide bail, they claimed exemption as peers and offered to give their word instead; James lost his temper and ordered them to be held in the Tower of London.

Although there was little evidence to suggest they intended to provoke this reaction, the result was a public relations disaster for James. When the bishops were escorted to court on 15 June, they were accompanied by huge crowds. Twenty-one noblemen appeared, promising to provide bail if needed, among them Danby and James' brother-in-law Clarendon. Among those pledging bail for Bishop Ken was a Quaker, the Nonconformist sect most sympathetic to James.

== Trial ==
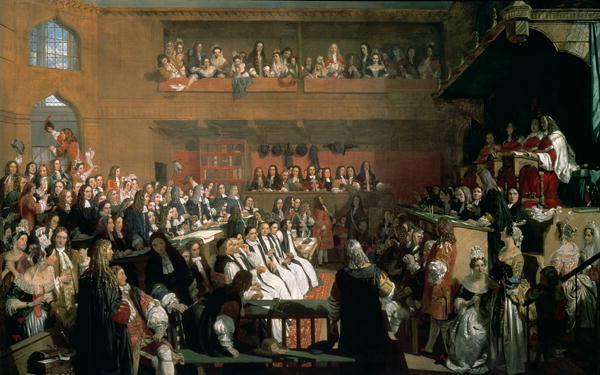
The Trial of the Seven Bishops by John Rogers Herbert

The trial took place at the Court of King's Bench in Westminster Hall on 29 June, with James confident of victory. Successive purges of the judiciary over the previous three years meant it was largely staffed by loyalists, while the jury selected by the Sheriffs of the City of London included several former Dissenters and government employees. However, of the four presiding judges, Powell and Holloway clearly favoured the bishops, Lord Chief Justice Wright was 'unusually moderate' and Richard Allibond impartial.

Lawyers for the bishops argued their petition simply confirmed a ruling established by Parliament and thus could not be considered a libel. In their summing up for the jury, three judges refused to comment on whether James was entitled to use his dispensing power and focused on the issue of libel. Wright and Allibond claimed it was, Powell and Holloway that it was not; Holloway went further, inviting the jury to consider whether the bishops were correct in claiming the dispensing power was illegal. The jury were allegedly ready to return a verdict of not guilty immediately after the trial but were delayed until the next morning by two members employed in James' household, including Michael Arnold.

The decision to prosecute in the first place was a political disaster for the Government, regardless of the outcome, made worse by the incompetence of the Crown prosecutors; a modern historian remarked it "had strong elements of the grotesque". Their acquittal resulted in wild celebrations throughout London, including among English Army regiments based in Hounslow, much to James' annoyance and concern.

== Aftermath ==
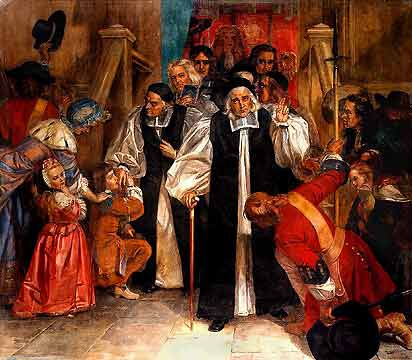
Acquittal of the Bishops, 30 June 1688, a key factor in the eventual removal of James; five later became Non-Jurors

The birth of James Francis on 10 June raised the prospect of a Catholic dynasty, while the trial resulted in widespread anti-Catholic riots throughout England and Scotland. The combination of these events is often seen as a key turning point. James' chief advisor, the Earl of Sunderland, who had grown alarmed by the regime's unpopularity, was visibly shaken by the hostility with which he was greeted when he attended the trial. The same day, an Invitation was sent to William of Orange, 'inviting' him to take the throne on behalf of his wife Mary, James' Protestant daughter. Drawn up by Henry Sydney, Sunderland's uncle and close friend since childhood, it was signed by the Immortal Seven, representatives from the key political constituencies whose support William needed to commit to an invasion.

Following the November 1688 Glorious Revolution, nine bishops became Non-Jurors, including five of the Seven: Sancroft, Ken, Lake, Turner and Lloyd. William Sherlock was one of 400 members of the clergy who did the same, although, like many others, he was later readmitted to the church. The majority did so out of conscience, rather than opposition to the new regime, and by confirming the supremacy of latitudinarians in the church establishment, their removal arguably made it more tolerant. The Toleration Act 1689 granted freedom of worship to Nonconformist Protestants, while the Occasional Conformity Act 1711 allowed Catholics and others to avoid serious fines.

== Portraits ==
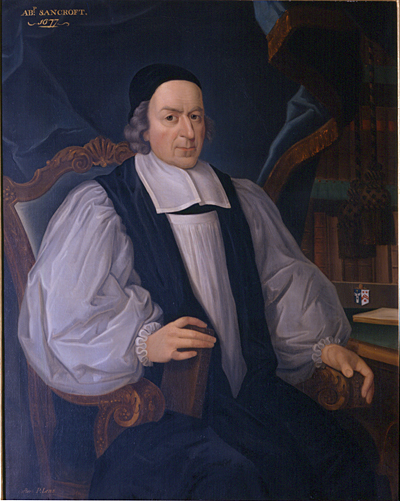
William Sancroft, Archbishop of Canterbury

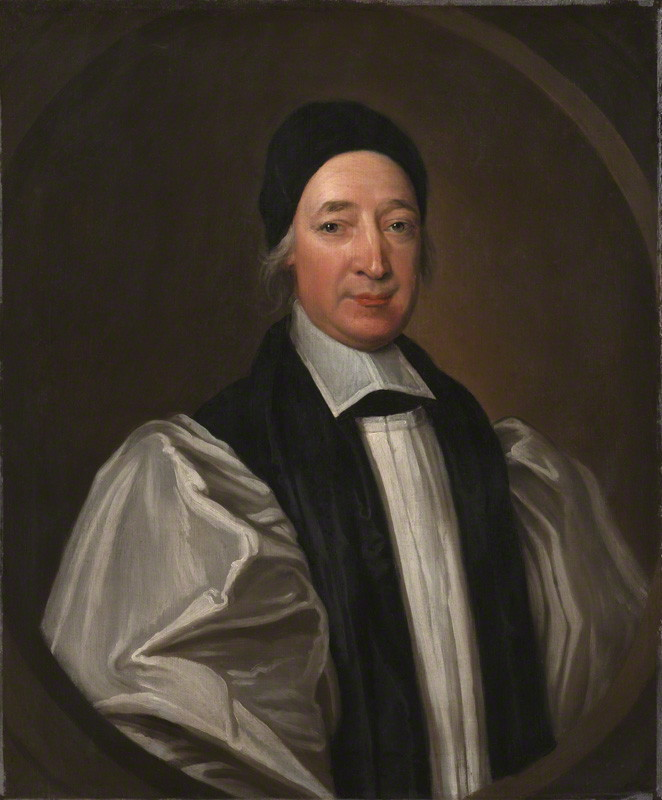
Thomas Ken, Bishop of Bath and Wells

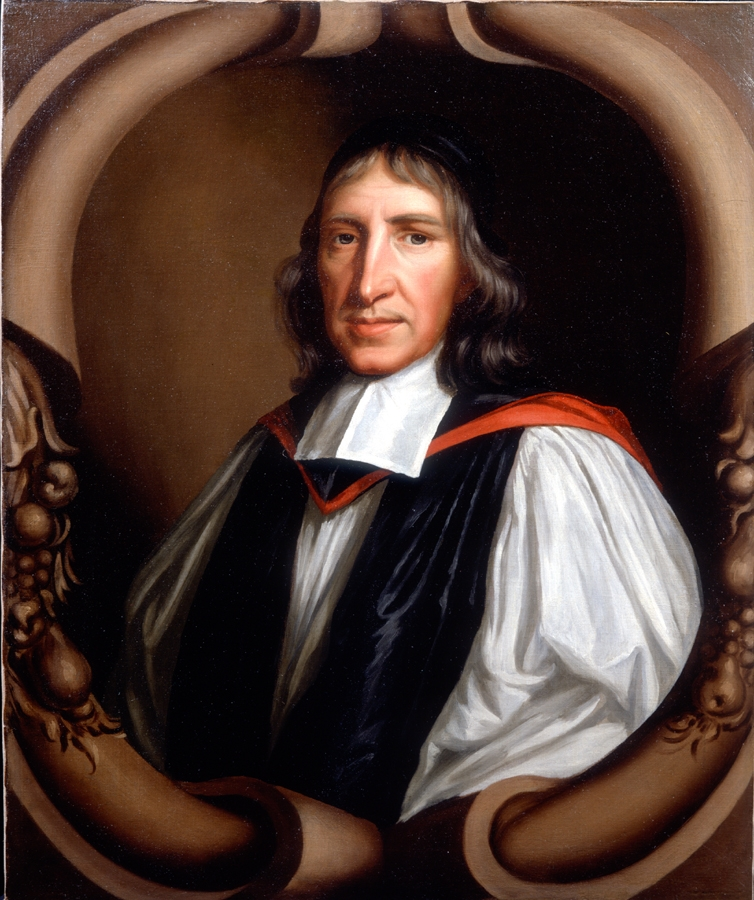
John Lake, Bishop of Chichester

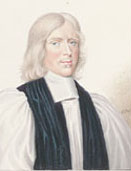
William Lloyd, Bishop of St Asaph

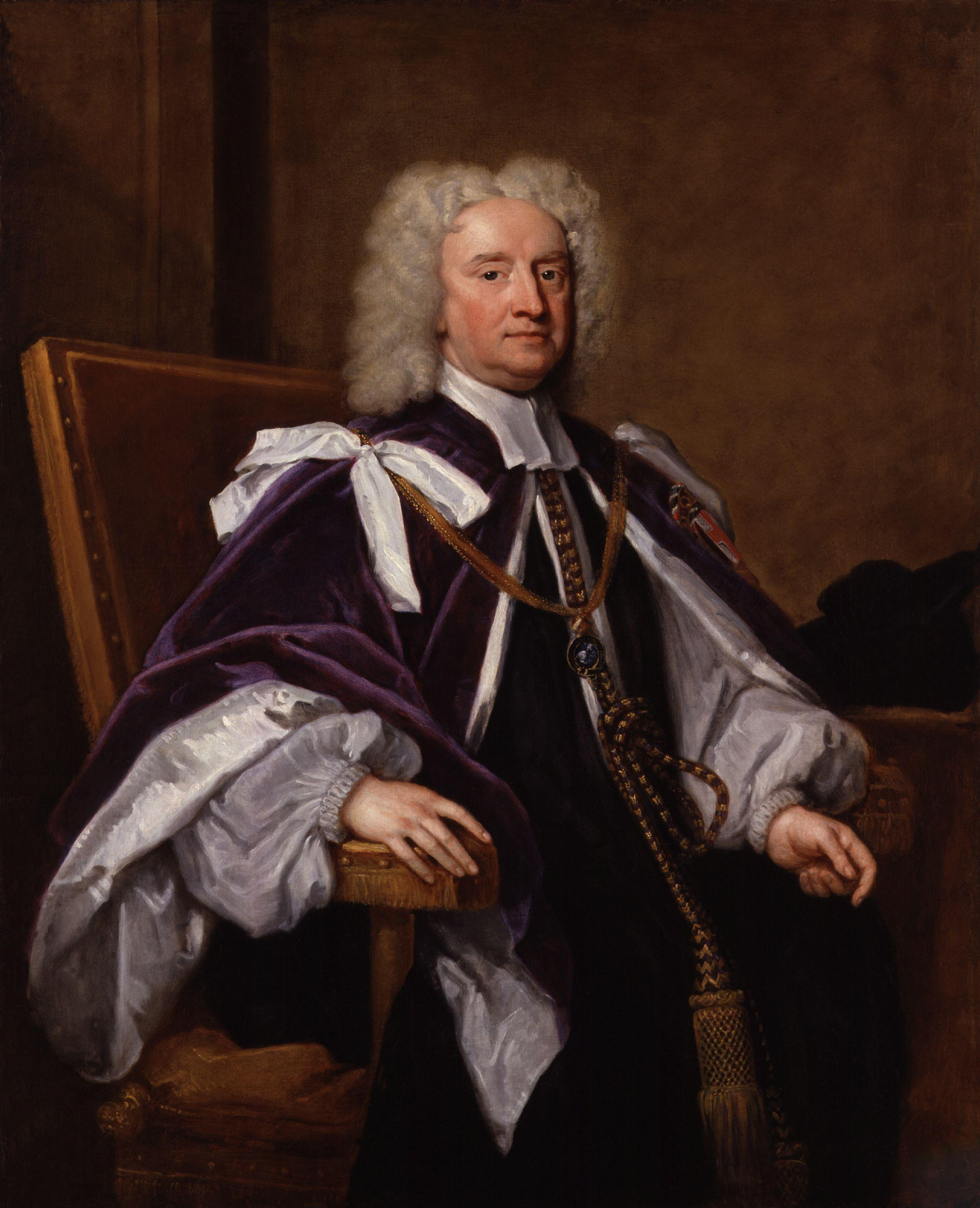
Jonathan Trelawny, Bishop of Bristol

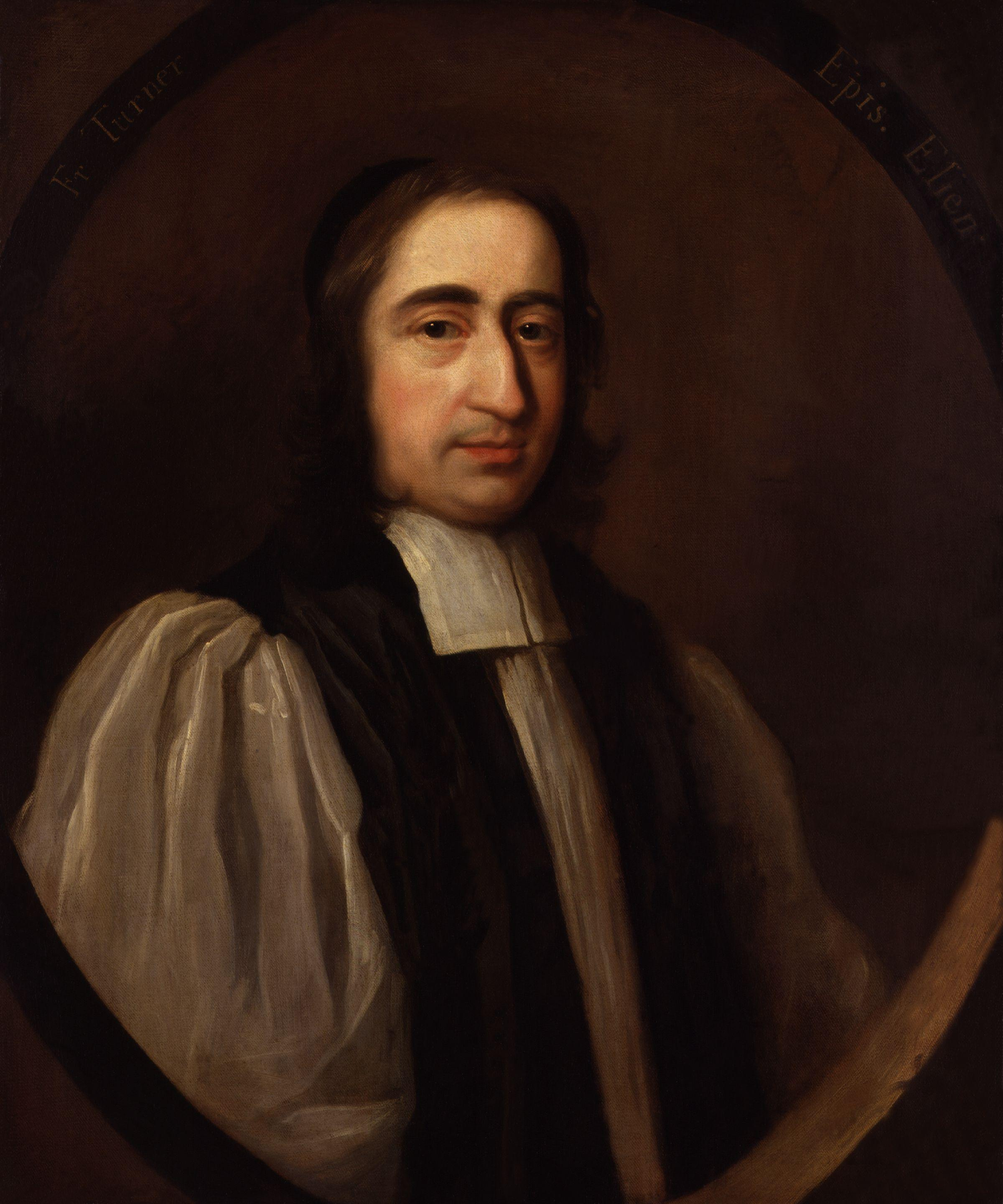
Francis Turner, Bishop of Ely

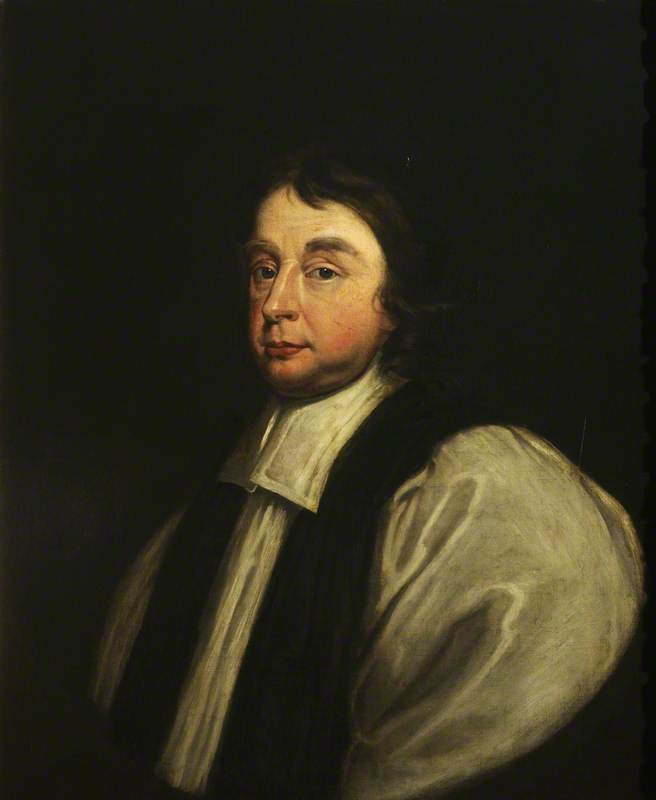
Thomas White, Bishop of Peterborough

== Sources ==
- Bosher, J. F. (February 1994). "The Franco-Catholic Danger, 1660–1715". History. 79 (255): 5–30. doi:10.1111/j.1468-229X.1994.tb01587.x. JSTOR 24421929.
- Carpenter, Edward (1956). The Protestant Bishop: Being the Life of Henry Compton, 1632–1713 Bishop of London. London; New York; Toronto: Longmans, Green and Co.
- Field, Clive D. (October 2012). "Counting Religion in England and Wales: The Long Eighteenth Century, c. 1680–c. 1840" (PDF). The Journal of Ecclesiastical History. 63 (4): 693–720. doi:10.1017/S0022046911002533.
- Flaningam, John (Autumn 1977). "The Occasional Conformity Controversy: Ideology and Party Politics, 1697–1711". Journal of British Studies. 17 (1): 38–62. doi:10.1086/385711. JSTOR 175691.
- Harris, Tim (2006). Revolution: The Great Crisis of the British Monarchy, 1685–1720. London; New York: Allen Lane. ISBN 978-0-7139-9759-0.
- Harris, Tim; Taylor, Stephen, eds. (2013). The Final Crisis of the Stuart Monarchy: The Revolutions of 1688–91 in Their British, Atlantic and European Contexts. Woodbridge: The Boydell Press. ISBN 978-1-84383-816-6.
- Henning, Basil Duke (1983). The House of Commons 1660–1690. Vol. I. London: Secker & Warburg. ISBN 0-436-19274-8.
- Hosford, Stuart (2004). "Sidney, Henry, first earl of Romney (1641–1704)". Oxford Dictionary of National Biography (online ed.). Oxford University Press. doi:10.1093/ref:odnb/25521. (Subscription, Wikipedia Library access or UK public library membership required.)
- Kenyon, J. P. (1958). Robert Spencer: Earl of Sunderland 1641–1702. London; New York; Toronto: Longmans, Green and Co.
- Kenyon, J. P., ed. (1966). The Stuart Constitution 1603–1688: Documents and Commentary. Cambridge: Cambridge University Press.
- Miller, John (1978). James II: A Study in Kingship. London: Wayland Publishers. ISBN 978-0-85340-058-5.
- Milne-Tyte, Robert (1989). Bloody Jeffreys: the Hanging Judge. London: André Deutsch. ISBN 978-0-233-98403-2.
- Mullett, Charles F. (November 1946). "A Case of Allegiance: William Sherlock and the Revolution of 1688". Huntington Library Quarterly. 10 (1): 86–88. doi:10.2307/3815830.
- Sowerby, Scott (2013). Making Toleration: The Repealers and the Glorious Revolution. Cambridge, MA: Harvard University Press. ISBN 978-0-674-07309-8.
- Spielvogel, Jackson J. (2014) [1980]. Western Civilization. Boston, MA: Wadsworth Publishing. ISBN 978-1-285-43640-1.
