= Declaration of Indulgence (1687) =

Pair of proclamations made by James II

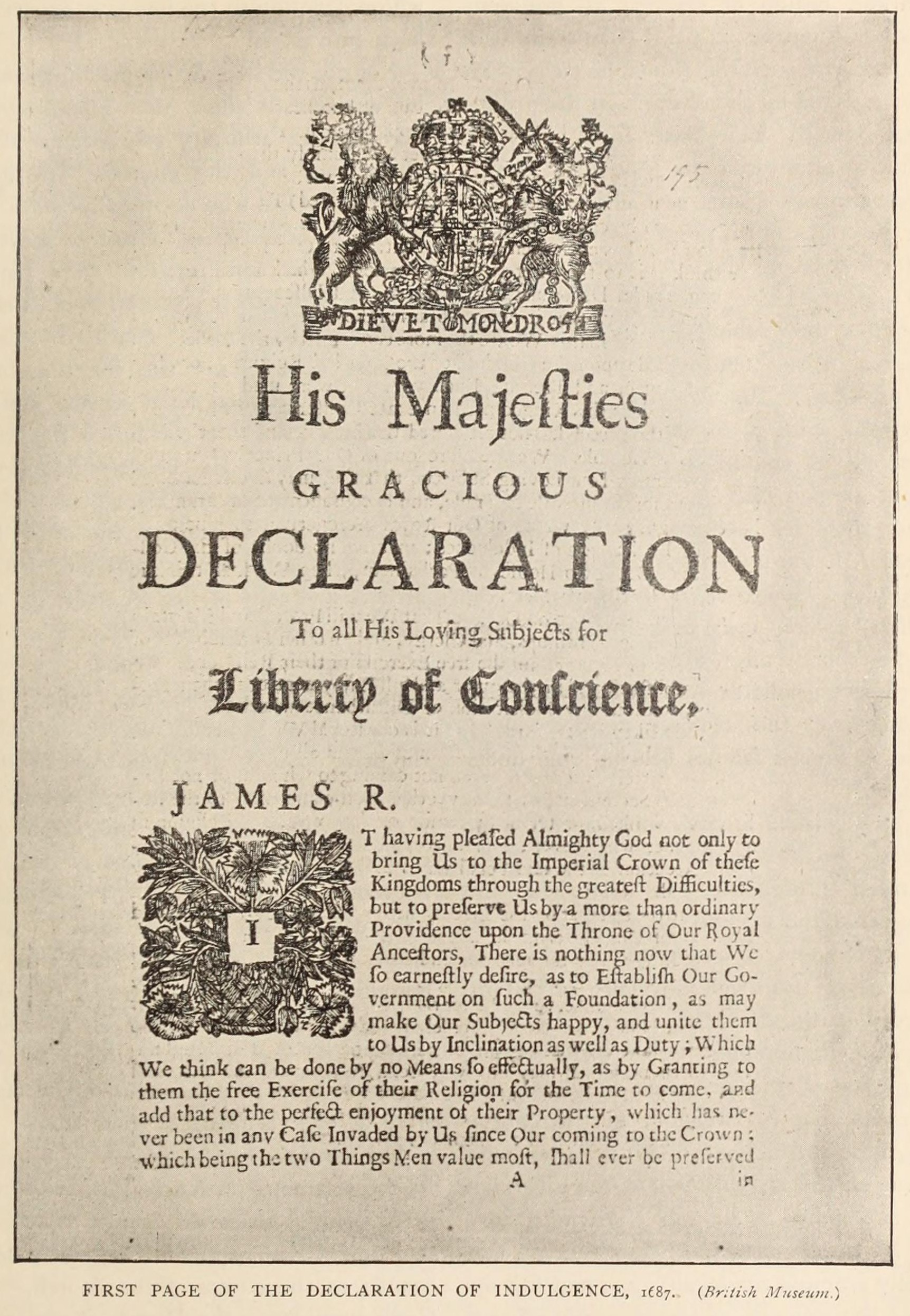
First page of the Declaration of Indulgence, 1687 (British Museum, published in 1898)

The Declaration of Indulgence, also called Declaration for Liberty of Conscience, was a pair of proclamations made by James II of England and Ireland and VII of Scotland in 1687. The Indulgence was first issued for Scotland on 12 February and then for England on 4 April 1687. An early step towards establishing freedom of religion in Great Britain and Ireland, it was cut short by the Glorious Revolution.

The Declaration granted broad religious freedom in England by suspending penal laws enforcing conformity to the Church of England and allowing people to worship in their homes or chapels as they saw fit, and it ended the requirement of affirming religious oaths before gaining employment in government office.

By use of the royal suspending power, the king lifted the religious penal laws and granted toleration to the various Christian denominations within his kingdoms. The Declaration of Indulgence was supported by William Penn, who was widely perceived to be its instigator. The declaration was greatly opposed by Anglicans in England on both religious and constitutional grounds. Some Anglicans objected to the fact that the Declaration had no specified limits and thus, at least in theory, licensed the practice of any religion, including Islam, Judaism, or paganism.

== 1687 ==
In Scotland, Presbyterians initially refused to accept the Declaration of Indulgence. The King re-issued it on 28 June, giving the Presbyterians the same liberties as Catholics; this was accepted by most of the Presbyterians, with the notable exception of the Covenanters. The Declaration of Indulgence, as well as granting religious liberties to his subjects, also reaffirmed the King's "Soveraign Authority, Prerogative Royal and absolute power, which all our Subjects are to obey without Reserve", and thus espoused an absolute monarchy.

The English version was welcomed by most nonconformists, but, as in Scotland, the Presbyterians were more reluctant to wholeheartedly accept it. There was concern that the toleration rested only on the King's arbitrary will.

== 1688 ==
The English Declaration of Indulgence was reissued on 27 April 1688, leading to open resistance from Anglicans. Few clergy read out the Declaration in Church.

William Sancroft, Archbishop of Canterbury, and six other Bishops presented a petition to the King declaring the Declaration of Indulgence illegal. James promptly had the seven bishops tried for rebellion and sedition; however, the bishops were acquitted. Many Presbyterians were sceptical of the king's intentions, while other dissenters, including the Quakers and the Baptists, gave thanks to the king for the Declaration of Indulgence.

The declarations were voided when James II was deposed in the Glorious Revolution. The Bill of Rights abolished the suspending power.

== See also ==
- Religion in the United Kingdom
