= 1685 English general election =

General election in England

- 1685

All 513 seats in the House of Commons 257 seats needed for a majority
	First party	Second party
Party	Tory	Whig
Seats before	193	309
Seats won	468	57
Seat change	▲275	▼252
- Composition of the House of Commons after the election

The 1685 English general election elected the only parliament of James II of England, known as the Loyal Parliament. This was the first time the pejorative words Whig and Tory were used as names for political groupings in the Parliament of England. Party strengths are an approximation, with many MPs' allegiances being unknown.

513 Members of Parliament were returned across 53 counties and 217 boroughs in England and Wales, most returning two members. Only 15 counties and 57 boroughs (a total of 100 seats) had contested elections, with the other candidates being returned unopposed. One borough had a double return, where multiple members were recorded elected, and another was subsequently voided by Parliament, forcing a by-election.

While the number of seats had not changed from the previous election, their electorate had been substantially altered by royal influence. Following the Exclusion crisis, ninety-nine boroughs had received new charters, the aim being to eliminate the influence of the Whigs. The Whigs also lost seats in county constituencies – which were not liable to charter manipulation – dropping from around sixty county seats in 1681 to only eight.

In the new parliament, the Tories now had their own majority in both houses, Commons and Lords. The exact breakdown of members returned at the election is not clear, but of the 525 members who served during the 1685-89 Parliamentary term, including those elected at later by-elections, 468 are estimated as Tories and 57 as Whigs. This estimate does not treat any members as uncommitted, and up to 30% of members were recorded as inactive.

The election had significant effects on Parliament demographically as well as politically. The newly elected members were mostly inexperienced, with slightly over half never having sat in Parliament before. The majority of these would stand down or lose their seats at the subsequent election in 1689. Members were much more likely to be High Church Anglicans, with very few Presbyterians or Independents compared to other Parliaments of the period. There was an unusually high share of government officials and military officers, and fewer country gentry. Two minors were elected, Peter Legh and the Hon. Thomas Windsor, aged 15 and 16 respectively.
