= Philip Howard (1629–1717) =

British soldier and politician

- Occupations: MP for Malmesbury (1662 – 1679) and Westminster (1689 – 1690); Colonel
- Spouse: Mary Jennings
- Children: 6, including Mary
- Parent(s): Thomas Howard, 1st Earl of Berkshire; Lady Elizabeth Cecil

Colonel Philip Howard (5 March 1629 – September 1717) was a British soldier and politician, the seventh son of Thomas Howard, 1st Earl of Berkshire.

== Life ==
Howard served as Member of Parliament for Malmesbury from 1662 to 1679 and Westminster from 1689 to 1690. In 1697 he was Colonel of the Red Regiment of Westminster Militia.

He married the heiress Mary Jennings, who brought a considerable estate to his descendants. They had two sons:

- James Howard (1679–1722), married Catherine Booth and had four children:
  - Catherine Elizabeth Howard (1700–1775), married Narcissus Proby in 1734
  - William Howard, (1701–1701) died aged 4 months
  - James Thomas Howard, (1703–1706) died aged two years
  - Martha Maria Howard (1707–1797), married Hon. Rev. Charles Hervey, son of John Hervey, 1st Earl of Bristol, died without issue
- Cmdr. Charles Howard (1681–1707), lost with HMS Swan, married Elizabeth Batten (d. June 1711) and had two children:
  - Capt. Philip Howard (1704–1741), married Margaret Skreen, father of John Howard, 15th Earl of Suffolk
  - Mary Howard (d. 1744), married Henry Scott, 1st Earl of Deloraine (d. 1730) in 1726, by whom she had two children; married William Windham in April 1734, without issue

Parliament of England
Preceded by Sir Francis Henry Lee, Bt; Lawrence Washington	Member of Parliament for Malmesbury with Sir Francis Henry Lee, Bt 1662–1668; Sir Edward Poole 1668–1673; Thomas Estcourt 1673–1679; 1662–1679	Succeeded by Sir William Estcourt, Bt; Sir James Long, Bt
Preceded by Charles Bonython; Michael Arnold	Member of Parliament for Westminster with William Pulteney; 1689–1690	Succeeded by William Pulteney; Sir Walter Clarges, Bt
