= Fire and Faggot Parliament =

English Parliament held in 1414

The Fire and Faggot Parliament was an English Parliament held in May 1414 during the reign of Henry V. It was held at Greyfriars in Leicester, and the Speaker was Walter Hungerford. It is named for passing the Suppression of Heresy Act 1414, which called for burning the Lollards with bundles of sticks ("faggots").

that whoever should read the Scriptures in English (which was then called Wicliffe's Learning) should forfeit land, cattle, goods, and life, and be condemned as heretics to God, enemies to the crown, and traitors to the kingdom; that they should not have the benefit of any sanctuary, though this was a privilege then granted to the most notorious malefactors; and that, if they continued obstinate, or relapsed after pardon, they should first be hanged for treason against the king, and then burned for heresy against God.

The decision was inspired by the 1199 decretal Vergentis in senium of Pope Innocent III. The Parliament also confirmed Archbishop Arundel's policy of licensing books for publication:

no book... be from henceforth read... within our province of Canterbury aforesaid, except the same be first examined by the University of Oxford or Cambridge... and... expressly approved and allowed by us or our successors, and in the name and authority of the university... delivered unto the stationers to be copied out.

The King received the rights to tonnage and poundage for life from this Parliament. This precedence was continued for all subsequent monarchs until the Useless Parliament in 1625 when Charles I was granted the right for only one year.
