= Duration of English, British and United Kingdom parliaments from 1660 =

This is a list of the parliaments of the United Kingdom, of Great Britain and of England from 1660 to the present day, with the duration of each parliament. The NP number is the number counting forward from the creation of the United Kingdom in 1801 and Great Britain in 1707. Prior to that, the parliaments are counted from the Restoration in 1660.

The duration column is calculated from the date of the first meeting of the parliament to that of dissolution.

Key to abbreviations in the NP column:

- CP: Convention Parliament: In seventeenth century usage a convention was a body in the form of a parliament, which had been summoned by a de facto ruler rather than a de jure monarch. Once the convention had recognised a de jure sovereign it could then convert itself into a parliament. The 1660 convention restored King Charles II of England. The 1689–90 convention offered the throne jointly to King William III of England and Queen Mary II of England.
- KC2: Parliament summoned by King Charles II of England.
- KJ2: Parliament summoned by King James II of England.
- WM: Parliament summoned by King William III of England and Queen Mary II of England (before her death in 1694, after which her husband was sole monarch).
- QA: Parliament summoned by Queen Anne.

== Parliaments before 1705 ==
	NP	Elected	Opened	Dissolved	Duration
CP		16 March 1660	25 April 1660	29 December 1660	249 days
KC2	1	18 February 1661	8 May 1661	24 January 1679	17 years, 262 days
KC2	2	25 January 1679	6 March 1679	12 July 1679	129 days
KC2	3	24 July 1679	21 October 1680	18 January 1681	90 days
KC2	4	20 January 1681	21 March 1681	28 March 1681	8 days
KJ2	1	14 February 1685	19 May 1685	2 July 1687	2 years, 45 days
CP		29 December 1688	22 January 1689	6 February 1690	1 year, 16 days
WM	1	6 February 1690	20 March 1690	11 October 1695	5 years, 206 days
WM	2	12 October 1695	22 November 1695	6 July 1698	2 years, 227 days
WM	3	13 July 1698	24 August 1698	19 December 1700	2 years, 118 days
WM	4	26 December 1700	6 February 1701	11 November 1701	279 days
WM	5	3 November 1701	30 December 1701	2 July 1702	185 days
QA	1	2 July 1702	20 August 1702	5 April 1705	2 years, 229 days

== Parliaments 1705–1800 ==
	NP	Elected	Opened	Dissolved	Duration
QA	2	7 May – 6 June 1705	14 June 1705	N/A (Note: The MPs of the 2nd Parliament of England in the reign of Queen Anne (elected 1705) and 45 members co-opted from the former Parliament of Scotland, became the House of Commons of the 1st Parliament of Great Britain in 1707. The duration for the 1st Parliament of Great Britain, in brackets, is counted from the first meeting of that Parliament to its dissolution. The duration for the 2nd Parliament of England in the reign of Queen Anne is counted from the first meeting of that Parliament in 1705 to the dissolution of the 1st Parliament of Great Britain in 1708.)	2 years, 132 days
GB	1	None	23 October 1707	3 April 1708	164 days
GB	2	30 April – 7 July 1708	8 July 1708	21 September 1710	2 years, 76 days
GB	3	2 October – 16 November 1710	25 November 1710	8 August 1713	2 years, 257 days
GB	4	22 August – 12 November 1713	12 November 1713	15 January 1715	1 year, 65 days
GB	5	22 January – 9 March 1715	17 March 1715	10 March 1722	6 years, 359 days
GB	6	19 March – 9 May 1722	10 May 1722	5 August 1727	5 years, 88 days
GB	7	14 August – 17 October 1727	28 November 1727	17 April 1734	6 years, 141 days
GB	8	22 April – 6 June 1734	13 June 1734	27 April 1741	6 years, 319 days
GB	9	30 April – 11 June 1741	25 June 1741	18 June 1747	5 years, 359 days
GB	10	26 June – 4 August 1747	13 August 1747	8 April 1754	6 years, 239 days
GB	11	13 April – 20 May 1754	31 May 1754	20 March 1761	6 years, 294 days
GB	12	25 March – 5 May 1761	19 May 1761	11 March 1768	6 years, 298 days
GB	13	16 March – 6 May 1768	10 May 1768	30 September 1774	6 years, 144 days
GB	14	5 October – 10 November 1774	29 November 1774	1 September 1780	5 years, 278 days
GB	15	6 September – 18 October 1780	31 October 1780	25 March 1784	3 years, 147 days
GB	16	30 March – 18 May 1784	18 May 1784	11 June 1790	6 years, 25 days
GB	17	16 June – 28 July 1790	10 August 1790	20 May 1796	5 years, 285 days
GB	18	25 May – 29 June 1796	12 July 1796	1 January 1801 (Note: The MPs of the 18th Parliament of Great Britain (elected 1796) and 100 members co-opted from the former Parliament of Ireland, became the House of Commons of the 1st Parliament of the United Kingdom on 1 January 1801. The duration for the 1st Parliament of the United Kingdom, in brackets, is counted from the first meeting of that Parliament to its dissolution. The duration for the 18th Parliament of Great Britain is counted from the first meeting of that Parliament in 1796 to the dissolution of the 1st Parliament of the United Kingdom in 1802.)	4 years, 174 days

== Parliaments 1801–1922 ==
	NP	Elected	Opened	Dissolved	Duration
UK	1	None	22 January 1801	29 June 1802	1 year, 159 days
UK	2	5 July – 28 August 1802	31 August 1802	24 October 1806	4 years, 55 days
UK	3	29 October – 17 December 1806	13 December 1806	29 April 1807	138 days
UK	4	4 May – 9 June 1807	22 June 1807	29 September 1812	5 years, 100 days
UK	5	5 October – 10 November 1812	24 November 1812	10 June 1818	5 years, 199 days
UK	6	15 June – 25 July 1818	4 August 1818	29 February 1820	1 year, 210 days
UK	7	6 March – 14 April 1820	21 April 1820	2 June 1826	6 years, 43 days
UK	8	7 June – 12 July 1826	25 July 1826	24 July 1830	4 years, 0 days
UK	9	29 July – 1 September 1830	14 September 1830	23 April 1831	222 days
UK	10	28 April – 1 June 1831	14 June 1831	3 December 1832	1 year, 173 days
UK	11	10 December 1832 – 8 January 1833	29 January 1833	29 December 1834	1 year, 335 days
UK	12	6 January – 6 February 1835	19 February 1835	17 July 1837	2 years, 149 days
UK	13	24 July – 18 August 1837	15 November 1837	23 June 1841	3 years, 221 days
UK	14	29 June – 22 July 1841	19 August 1841	23 July 1847	5 years, 339 days
UK	15	29 July – 26 August 1847	18 November 1847	1 July 1852	4 years, 227 days
UK	16	7–31 July 1852	4 November 1852	21 March 1857	4 years, 138 days
UK	17	27 March – 24 April 1857	30 April 1857	23 April 1859	1 year, 359 days
UK	18	28 April – 18 May 1859	31 May 1859	6 July 1865	6 years, 37 days
UK	19	11–24 July 1865	1 February 1866	11 November 1868	2 years, 285 days
UK	20	17 November – 7 December 1868	10 December 1868	26 January 1874	5 years, 48 days
UK	21	31 January – 17 February 1874	5 March 1874	24 March 1880	6 years, 20 days
UK	22	31 March – 27 April 1880	29 April 1880	18 November 1885	5 years, 204 days
UK	23	24 November – 18 December 1885	12 January 1886	26 June 1886	166 days
UK	24	1–27 July 1886	5 August 1886	28 June 1892	5 years, 329 days
UK	25	4–26 July 1892	4 August 1892	8 July 1895	2 years, 339 days
UK	26	13 July – 7 August 1895	12 August 1895	25 September 1900	5 years, 45 days
UK	27	1–24 October 1900	3 December 1900	8 January 1906	5 years, 37 days
UK	28	12 January – 8 February 1906	13 February 1906	10 January 1910	3 years, 332 days
UK	29	15 January – 10 February 1910	15 February 1910	28 November 1910	287 days
UK	30	3–19 December 1910	31 January 1911	25 November 1918	7 years, 299 days (Note: This, the first parliament since the Civil War to exceed 7 years, was so long because of the extension of the length of this parliament for the duration of the First World War.)
UK	31	14 December 1918	4 February 1919	26 October 1922	3 years, 265 days

== Parliaments from 1922 ==
	NP	Elected	Opened	Dissolved	Duration
UK	32	15 November 1922	20 November 1922	16 November 1923	362 days
UK	33	6 December 1923	8 January 1924	9 October 1924	276 days
UK	34	29 October 1924	2 December 1924	10 May 1929	4 years, 160 days
UK	35	30 May 1929	25 June 1929	8 October 1931	2 years, 106 days
UK	36	27 October 1931	3 November 1931	25 October 1935	3 years, 357 days
UK	37	14 November 1935	26 November 1935	15 June 1945	9 years, 202 days (Note: At the time of the outbreak of the Second World War in September 1939, there was little more than a year before the 37th UK Parliament was due to dissolve, but its duration was extended until hostilities in Europe were over. This led to the eventual length of almost ten years for this parliament.)
UK	38	5 July 1945	1 August 1945	3 February 1950	4 years, 187 days
UK	39	23 February 1950	1 March 1950	5 October 1951	1 year, 219 days
UK	40	25 October 1951	31 October 1951	6 May 1955	3 years, 188 days
UK	41	26 May 1955	7 June 1955	18 September 1959	4 years, 104 days
UK	42	8 October 1959	20 October 1959	25 September 1964	4 years, 342 days
UK	43	15 October 1964	27 October 1964	10 March 1966	1 year, 135 days
UK	44	31 March 1966	18 April 1966	29 May 1970	4 years, 42 days
UK	45	18 June 1970	29 June 1970	8 February 1974	3 years, 225 days
UK	46	28 February 1974	6 March 1974	20 September 1974	199 days
UK	47	10 October 1974	22 October 1974	7 April 1979	4 years, 168 days
UK	48	3 May 1979	9 May 1979	13 May 1983	4 years, 5 days
UK	49	9 June 1983	15 June 1983	18 May 1987	3 years, 338 days
UK	50	11 June 1987	17 June 1987	16 March 1992	4 years, 274 days
UK	51	9 April 1992	27 April 1992	8 April 1997	4 years, 347 days
UK	52	1 May 1997	7 May 1997	14 May 2001	4 years, 8 days
UK	53	7 June 2001	13 June 2001	11 April 2005	3 years, 303 days
UK	54	5 May 2005	11 May 2005	12 April 2010	4 years, 337 days
UK	55	6 May 2010	25 May 2010	30 March 2015 (Note: This was the only dissolution under the Fixed-term Parliaments Act 2011, which set the parliamentary term at a fixed five years, supposedly barring a Prime Minister from calling an election early for political gain, as had been the common practice.)	4 years, 310 days
UK	56	7 May 2015	27 May 2015	3 May 2017	1 year, 342 days
UK	57	8 June 2017	21 June 2017	6 November 2019	2 years, 139 days
UK	58	12 December 2019	17 December 2019	30 May 2024	4 years, 166 days
UK	59	4 July 2024	9 July 2024	Not yet	1 year, 164 days

== See also ==
- Duration of English parliaments before 1660
- List of British governments
- List of parliaments of England
- List of parliaments of Great Britain
- List of parliaments of the United Kingdom
- List of United Kingdom general elections
