= Richard Waldegrave (soldier) =

Sir Richard Waldegrave (died 2 May 1434) was the son of Sir Richard Waldegrave. He had served in the Hundred Years' War and in 1402, was appointed to keep the seas (with the 4th Baron Clinton, the 5th Baron Fauconberg and Sir John Howard – grandfather of the 1st Duke of Norfolk), in which time he landed 10,000 men in Brittany and captured Le Conquet and the Île de Ré.

He married Jane Montchensey and they had one son, William (later Sir William Waldegrave).
