= James Pickering =

English politician (died c.1398)

Sir James Pickering (died c. 1398) was Speaker of the House of Commons of England in 1378 (which met in Gloucester) and again from 1382 to 1383. The protestation which, as Speaker, he made for freedom of speech, and declaring the loyalty of the Commons, was the first recorded in the rolls.

He was descended from the knightly Pickering family of Killington, then in Westmorland, son of Thomas Pickering (1310-1375) and Elizabeth Greystoke (1300-1370), and was married to Alice Ellerton. He owned land at Killington in Westmorland and Selby in Yorkshire and was knighted by 1361.

He was a knight of the shire for Westmorland in 1362, 1365, 1377–1379 and 1382 and Cumberland in 1368. On 20 December 1368 he was commissioner of array in Westmorland, to choose twenty archers to serve under Sir William Windsor in Ireland, in his position of Chief justice of Ireland, in order, it has been said, to implement 'some highly dubious financial practices.' He served as MP for Yorkshire in 1383, 1384, 1388 and 1390, Sheriff of Yorkshire for 1389, 1393 and 1397 and MP for Yorkshire for the last time in September 1397.

== See also ==
- List of speakers of the House of Commons of England

== Notes ==
Political offices
Preceded by Sir Peter de la Mare	Speaker of the House of Commons; 1378	Succeeded by Sir John Guildesborough
Preceded by Sir Richard Waldegrave	Speaker of the House of Commons; 1382–1383	Succeeded by John Bussy
