= Loyal Parliament =

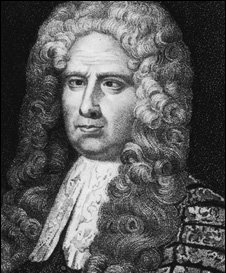
Sir John Trevor, Speaker of the Commons

The Loyal Parliament was the only Parliament of England of King James II, in theory continuing from May 1685 to July 1687, but in practice sitting during 1685 only. It gained its name because at the outset most of its members were loyal to the new king. The Whigs, who had previously resisted James's inheriting the throne, were outnumbered both in the Commons and in the Lords by Tories.

In May 1685 the Parliament treated James generously in financial matters, but by November of the same year it had developed concerns about the direction he was taking, so he prevented it from meeting again.

No other parliament was held by James before he fled the country on 18 December 1688 as a result of the Glorious Revolution.

== Background ==
James's greatest political problem was his known Roman Catholicism, which left him alienated from both political parties in England, but most of all from the Whigs. Between 1679 and 1681 the Whigs had failed in their attempts to pass the Exclusion Bill to exclude James from the throne, but his brother Charles II had had great trouble in defeating this campaign.

James's supporters were the High Anglican Tories. The origins of the Tories as a political faction were in the Abhorrers, those who had opposed the Exclusion Bill.

== Elections ==
The 1685 elections to the House of Commons, especially in the boroughs, were heavily influenced by the king. Following the Exclusion crisis, ninety-nine boroughs had received new charters, the aim being to eliminate the influence of the Whigs. Partly as a result of this, there were only fifty-seven Whigs in the new House of Commons, in which only four years before they had held a majority. Yet the Whigs also lost seats in county constituencies that weren't liable to charter manipulation, dropping from around sixty county seats in 1681 to only eight. In the new parliament, the Tories now had their own majority in both houses, Commons and Lords.

== Events ==
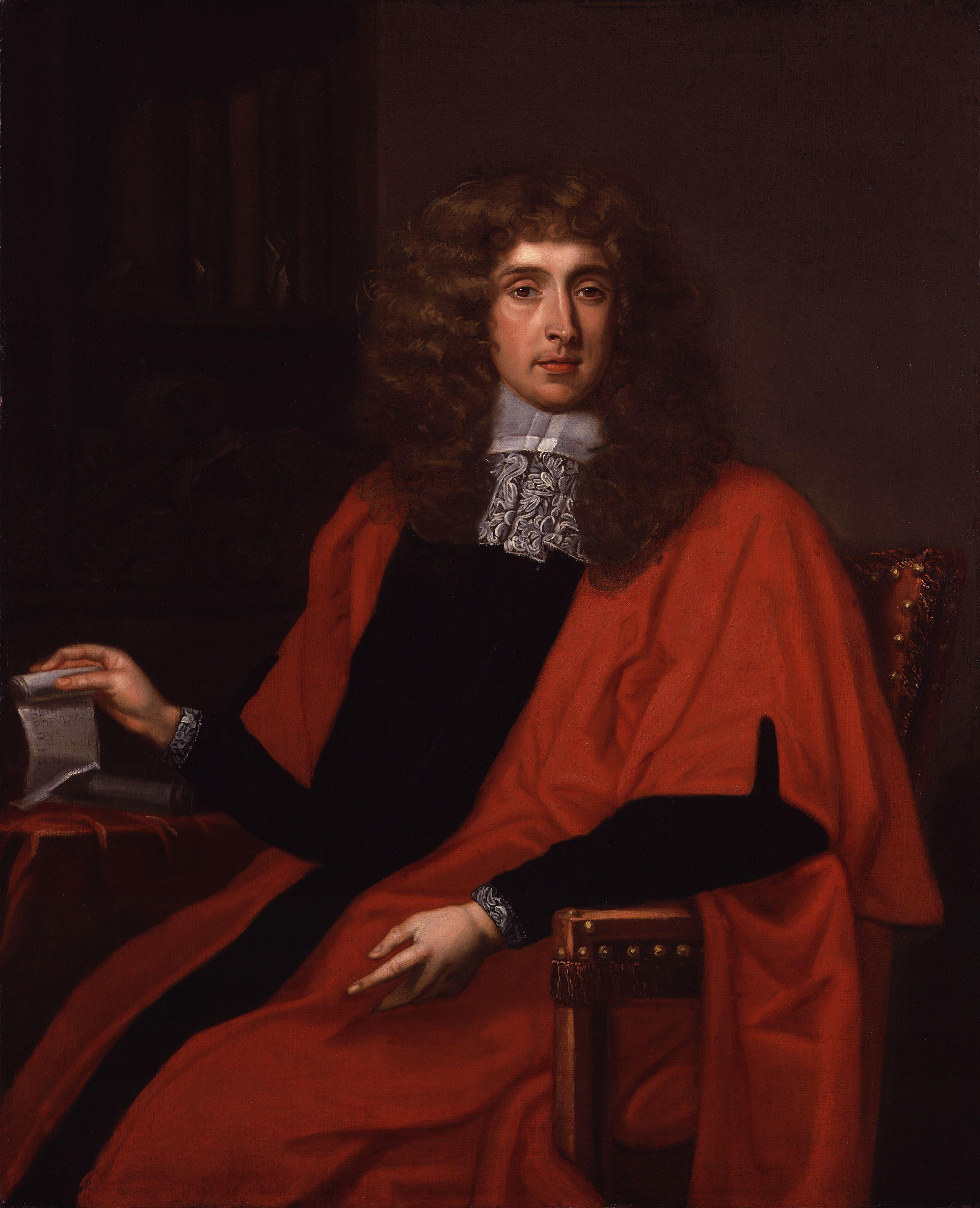
Lord Jeffreys, the Lord Chancellor

The king had summoned parliament for 19 May, when it first met, and on 22 May John Trevor, a Tory and a supporter of James, was confirmed as Speaker of the Commons. The king had appointed Lord Jeffreys as Lord Chancellor. The first session of the parliament lasted from 19 May until 2 July 1685.

From 1414 until 1625, it had been customary at the beginning of each new monarch's reign for parliament to grant him or her the duties of tonnage and poundage for life. The parliament of 1625, the first of Charles I's reign, had broken with tradition by granting them for one year only. At the outset of the 1685 debate in the Commons on this matter, Sir Edward Seymour, a Tory, moved that the House conduct an investigation into irregularities about the election of some of its members before granting any revenues to the king, but no-one seconded this motion. The parliament proceeded to give James tonnage and poundage for life and it also gave him high impositions on sugar and tobacco, in defiance of the protests from producers and traders in those commodities.

A historian of the period has called the Parliament "the most loyal Parliament a Stewart ever had".

The unsuccessful Monmouth Rebellion in the south-west of England of June and July 1685, and a smaller simultaneous rebellion in Scotland led by the Earl of Argyll, demonstrated that the country was divided over accepting James as King, but the rebels acted without parliamentary support. In November 1685, Lord Delamere was tried in the House of Lords for treason for his complicity in the Rebellion. James appointed Judge Jeffreys to preside as Lord High Steward, and Jeffreys chose thirty peers as Triers to sit with him. As Macaulay later pointed out, the thirty men chosen were all "in politics vehemently opposed to the prisoner", and fifteen were colonels of regiments, appointments from which the king could remove them. Nevertheless, to James's anger all thirty voted for acquittal, and this marked the end of the period of vengeance upon the rebels.

During the Rebellion, James raised substantial forces to oppose it and also commissioned many Roman Catholics to command them. Following the Rebellion, it became clear that unlike his brother, Charles, James had no intention of letting go of the extra forces he had raised and planned to maintain a much larger standing army than before. He was able to do this because parliament had put him in a strong financial position. This raised fears that the country would in future not only be governed by a Popish king but that he would be supported by an army of the same persuasion.

On 9 November 1685, James made a speech to Parliament in which he announced that he proposed to do away with the Test Acts which prohibited Roman Catholics from holding public offices, and in particular that he intended to keep many as army officers. This met strong opposition from Tories as well as Whigs. In a crucial vote on 13 November on whether to proceed with supplying funds to the king before discussing the nation's grievances, James's loyalists were defeated by his opponents by one vote, with 182 voting for the court and 183 against. James's response was to prorogue Parliament on 20 November 1685. It did not meet again, with James choosing to silence the opposition of his parliament by a series of prorogations. The first was from 20 November until 15 February 1685/6, the next to 28 April, and the third to 22 November 1686. There were two more prorogations in 1687, and the parliament was finally dissolved by proclamation on 2 July 1687.

== Aftermath ==
No further parliaments met before King James was overthrown in the Glorious Revolution of 1688. Although he summoned a parliament in September 1688, with the intention of having it meet in November, the elections to the Commons were cancelled, due to the imminent invasion of William of Orange.

After a disastrous campaign against William's forces, James retreated to London before finally fleeing the country on 18 December 1688. An irregular Convention Parliament met on 22 January 1688/9, summoned by William. It consisted of the House of Lords and the surviving members of the Commons from the Oxford Parliament of 1681, the last of Charles II's reign. This assembly invited William III and Mary II to take what it considered to be the vacant throne.

== In literature ==
The Loyal Parliament is depicted in Robert Neil's historical novel Lillibulero. The book's protagonist, although a Tory Member of Parliament, is alarmed by the King's intention to keep a standing army and to restore the Church of Rome, so is drawn into an alliance with the minority Whigs to defy the King. This draws on him the King's anger and ultimately leads to his supporting the Glorious Revolution.

== See also ==
- List of parliaments of England
- 1685 English general election
- Duration of English, British and United Kingdom parliaments from 1660
- Exclusion Bill
