= Richard Waldegrave (politician) =

English politician (died 1410)

Sir Richard Waldegrave

Speaker of the House of Commons
- In office 18 November 1381 – 25 February 1382
- Monarch: Richard II
- Preceded by: Sir John Guildesborough
- Succeeded by: Sir James Pickering

Member of Parliament for Suffolk
- In office 1376–1390

Sir Richard Waldegrave (/ˈwɔːlɡreɪv/; c. 1338 – 2 May 1410) was an English knight and Member of Parliament, who served as Speaker of the House of Commons from November 1381 to February 1382.

== Background and early life ==
Richard Waldegrave was born around 1338. His father was Sir Richard Waldegrave, a Lincolnshire landowner who held the manor of Brant Broughton, and had represented the county during the parliament of 1335. He died in January 1340, and the younger Richard succeeded to his lands.

In about 1363, the son married Joan, widow of Sir Robert Bures, who held several manors in Suffolk.

== Military career ==
During his early career, Richard entered the service of the de Bohun family and joined the household of William de Bohun, 1st Earl of Northampton. As one of the earl's men, Richard likely saw action as part of Edward III's army that attacked Paris in 1360. When William de Bohun died that same year, Richard continued to serve his son Humphrey, 7th earl of Hereford. He joined the earl on an expedition to Poland, where in early 1363, they assisted the Teutonic Order in their campaigns against the Pagans. Richard's military career saw him travel across Europe. He fought for the king of Cyprus against the Turks and was present at the signing of the Treaty of Attalia in 1364.

By 1369, he was serving John of Gaunt during the duke's campaign in France, and in 1371 had returned to the service of earl Humphrey. The following year, Richard joined Hereford's army which set out to relieve the English forces at La Rochelle. Humphrey died in 1373, but Richard retained his connections to the family, primarily Hereford's widow, Joan.

== Parliamentary and royal service ==
Richard had always been close to the Holland family, especially Sir John Holland. When Holland's half-brother Richard II acceded to the throne in 1377, Waldegrave became increasingly attached to the royal court. He was employed as a 'King's knight' and on 6 December that year, was granted the castle of Moresende for his service.

He was first elected as an MP in 1376, and then again in Oct 1377, 1378 and 1381. Between 18 November 1381 and 25 February 1382, he served as Speaker of the House of Commons, during the first session of parliament held after the Peasants' Revolt. During his speakership parliament was chiefly occupied with the revocation of the charters granted to the villeins by Richard during Wat Tyler's rebellion. He continued to be elected to parliament during the sessions of 1383, 1386, 1388 and 1389-90.

By 1382, Richard had clearly become further ingratiated into the king's court; he was appointed steward of the estates provided in the dower of Queen Anne. The king obviously held Waldegrave in high regard, for in May 1384, he was awarded with a charter of free warren for his manors in Northamptonshire. During the summer of 1385, he accompanied king Richard on his disastrous campaign against Scotland, commanding a retinue of seven men-at-arms and eighteen archers.

Waldegrave also became close associates with the king's other controversial courtiers, such as Sir Nicholas Brembre. Simultaneously, he maintained links with Richard II's leading opponents, notably Richard Fitzalan, 4th Earl of Arundel and his brother Thomas, bishop of Ely, as well as a number of Thomas, Duke of Gloucester's retainers. Sir Richard was obviously not viewed with hostility by the Lords Appellant when they seized control of the government in 1388, since he was appointed to the commissions designed to rectify the abuses of the royal administration.

Despite this, he remained close to Richard II, and on 2 November 1393 was appointed to the King's Council, spending the next four years in this position. In 1396, he served as one of the king's envoys during diplomatic negotiations with Scotland.

When Richard II destroyed the Lords Appellant in 1397 and initiated a period of autocratic rule, Waldegrave served in the parliament that condemned the earl of Arundel, banished archbishop Thomas and heard the news of Gloucester's murder. On 14 November, he was pardoned for the connections he had to the Lords Appellant, and the actions he took during the 1387-89 period. Keen to retire from office, he also secured permission to be exempted from the king's service. Unlike many of Richard's other councillors, Waldegrave appeared to have no interest in further serving the king during the period of his 'tyranny'.

== Later life and death ==
By the accession of Henry IV in 1399, Waldegrave was old and disinterested in participating in the affairs of the realm. Nevertheless, he was summoned to great councils in 1401 and 1403, and occasionally served on royal commissions. In 1404, he finally gained exemption from holding office.

He died at Smallbridge on 2 May 1410, and was buried on the north side of the parish church of St. Mary at Bures in Suffolk. He was survived by a son, Sir Richard Waldegrave.

Political offices
Preceded by Sir John Guildesborough	Speaker of the English House of Commons; 1381–1382	Succeeded by Sir James Pickering
