= William Waller (informer) =

English justice and politician

Sir William Waller (c.1639 – 18 July 1699) was an English justice and politician from Middlesex. He was active against Roman Catholics during the alleged Popish Plot 1678–1679 and was removed from the commission of the peace in April 1680 for his overzealousness. He sat in the House of Commons between 1680 and 1682 when he fled to Holland although he retained the seat until 1685. He returned to England with Prince of Orange in November 1688.

== Biography ==
Waller was son of Sir William Waller (1597?–1668), the famous Parliamentary Civil War general, and his second wife, Anne Finch. He was educated at Leiden University and afterwards travelled abroad. He inherited Osterley Park on the death of his father and sold it in 1670.

Waller distinguished himself during the period of the Popish Plot by his activity as a Middlesex justice in catching priests, burning Roman Catholic books and vestments, and getting up evidence. He was elected as a Fellow of the Royal Society in 1679, and early 1680 he was the discoverer of the meal-tub plot and one of the witnesses against Edward Fitzharris. In April 1680 the king put him out of the commission of the peace.

Waller was elected Member of Parliament for Westminster in 1680 and 1681. During the reaction which followed he fled to Amsterdam, of which city he was admitted a burgher. In 1683 and the following year he was at Bremen, of which place Lord Preston, the English ambassador at Paris, describes him as governor. Other political exiles gathered round him, and it became the nest of all the persons accused of the last conspiracy, i.e. the Rye House Plot. "They style Waller, by way of commendation, a second Cromwell", adds Preston. In 1685 wrote an anti-catholic pamphlet, The Tragical History of Jetzer, relating the Jetzer affair.

When the Prince of Orange invaded England in 1688 (during the Glorious Revolution), Waller accompanied him, and he was with the prince at Exeter. William, however, would give him no employment. He died in poverty on 18 July 1699.

== Popular culture ==
Waller was satirised as "Industrious Arod" in the second part of Absalom and Achitophel (ll. 534–55):

The labours of this midnight magistrate
Might vie with Corah's to preserve the State.

He is very often introduced in the ballads and caricatures of the Exclusion Bill and Popish plot times.

== Family ==
Waller had married Catherine, the daughter of Bussy Mansel of Briton Ferry, Glamorgan.
