= Anthony Earbury =

Anthony Earbury (Earburie, Erbery, etc.) (c. 1571-1638) was a minister in late Elizabethan and early Stuart England, who represented Puritan interests while remaining within the Anglican ministry. He is notable for his involvement in the puritan group at the Hampton Court Conference and his confrontation with Archbishop Richard Bancroft soon afterwards, and in later life for his resistance to a challenge to his ministry brought on personal grounds by Sir Edward Powell, Master of Requests. Associated with various groups and patrons interested in the emigrant Puritan ministry in America, he was prebendary of Wherwell in Hampshire, under the patronage of the Barons De La Warr, and vicar of Westonzoyland, Somerset for most of his career, and is thought to have been a chaplain to George Villiers, 1st Duke of Buckingham.

== Education ==
Of Wiltshire origins, Earbury entered Magdalen Hall in the University of Oxford as a commoner, matriculating in October 1589 aged 18. He graduated B.A. at Merton College on 5 February 1591/92, and M.A. on 12 November 1594. On 13 March 1598/99 he received royal presentation to the archdeaconry of St Asaph. He was instituted to the Rectory of Wherwell (Winchester jurisdiction) in May 1602 on the lay presentation of Anna, the dowager Lady De La Warr, whose husband William West had died in 1595. West himself (who had survived a conviction for treason under Queen Mary I in connection with Henry Dudley's conspiracy) had presented the notable puritan Stephen Bachiler to the vicarage of Wherwell in 1587, and Bachiler was still in occupation at Earbury's institution as rector, the two men appearing together in the Liber cleri of 1603.

As prebendary rector of Wherwell, in which he continued until 1635, Earbury remained directly associated with the patronage of the De La Warr family, successively under Thomas West, 2nd Baron De La Warr (son of the first baron), who died in March 1601/02, and then of his son Thomas West, 3rd Baron De La Warr, who was Governor-for-life and Captain-general of the Colony of Virginia until his death in 1618.

== The Sussex Petition ==
Earbury is stated to have been part of the inner circle, together with John Rainolds, Laurence Chaderton, John Knewstubs and other University men and ministers, who prepared and advanced the Millenary Petition of 1603, meekly advocating to King James a series of reforms in the established church to enable Puritan ministers to remain in conformity with it.

Its success led to the formation of a Puritan committee in London, led by Henry Jacob, to advance petitions on behalf of ministers and congregations in various regions of the country. Earbury was particularly involved with Stephen Goffe, rector of Bramber, Samuel Norden, rector of Hamsey, John Frewen, rector of Northiam and others in the petitions for Sussex, which were circulated, claiming that the whole laity of Sussex approved of its contents. This raised such a stir that its promoters, including Earbury, were arrested in late September 1603 at the instigation of John Whitgift and Richard Bancroft, and were interrogated by the Bishop of Chichester and the Privy Council.

Despite these difficulties, Earbury, Norden, Frewen and Goldsmith represented Sussex among the puritan reformists admitted to the Hampton Court Conference in 1604. Among those occupying formal places in the conference Chaderton (Master of Emmanuel College, Cambridge) and Reinolds (President of Corpus Christi College, Oxford) were received gracefully, but the King thought the prominent East Anglian puritan Knewstubs an uncharitable man.

== Richard Bancroft ==
Soon after this, Earbury challenged the episcopal party in the person of Richard Bancroft, then Bishop of London. He found that Bancroft had, over the preceding years and up to the present, been involved in secret discussions and negotiations with the Catholics. He drafted a bill accusing Bancroft of treason, which was printed and put forth by William Jones, puritan propagandist. Earbury was then living in the Devon house of Thomas West, "more in curtesie then for anie stipend". The bill was delivered for presentation by Herbert Pelham (1545-1620), son-in-law of the 2nd Baron de la Warr, and was presented on 15 May 1604, "For the Declaration of certayne practises of the Bishops of London to be treson", the Speaker and Commons deemed it to be libellous and sent Jones and Earbury to Newgate Prison for examination by the Privy Council. The prisoners made their petitions for release, and it appears that, while Bancroft had in fact been in negotiation with the Catholics this had been with royal approval from both Queen Elizabeth and King James, and the Council was mainly concerned because the secret discussions had been "leaked".

Earbury, being in possession of this knowledge, was released without further adverse consequences, and indeed managed to retain his position as prebendary rectory of Wherwell, while by 1605 Samuel Norden, Stephen Goffe and Stephen Bachiler were deprived or ejected from their livings for their unwillingness to conform. Earbury was by this time married, his son Mathias born c. 1604 and his daughter Jane c. 1609. On 10 July 1605 the four Wardens of the Worshipful Company of Mercers in London nominated Anthony Earbury MA to the Dean and Chapter of Canterbury Cathedral, to be presented by them to Archbishop Bancroft for the rectory of St Michael Paternoster Royal, London.

== Sir Richard Martyn ==
Soon after this Earbury became involved in the case of John Eccleston (or Eglestone), a debtor in Ludgate Prison. A Warden of the Worshipful Company of Goldsmiths in 1587/88, Eccleston helped prepare and approve the cases of weights for use in Elizabeth's reforms of her gold and silver coinage. His sister Dorcas (died 1599) was the wife of Sir Richard Martyn, Master of the Mint 1582-1617, Lord Mayor of London 1588/89 and 1593/94, and Master of the Goldsmiths' Company in 1592/93. The Martyns were supporters of presbyterian reform of the church. With a fellow goldsmith Eccleston had acquired two parts, and a lease of the third, of the manor of Elsham Priory, in Elsham, North Lincolnshire, from Henry Stanley, 4th Earl of Derby, all of which in time passed to Eccleston alone. In 1597 several goldsmiths had complained that Martyn was retaining large sums from them and converting it to his own use. By the early 1600s Eccleston had fallen heavily into debt, not least to Sir Richard Martyn, and was imprisoned for some long time.

Martyn claimed that his brother-in-law had agreed in prison to convey his titles in Elsham to him in settlement of more than £2000 owing to him. However at the same time Anthony Earbury was visiting Eccleston in prison ("under colour of religion and charitie") and came to a like agreement to get Eccleston released, to pay off all his debts and to provide him with an annuity of 100 marks, for a similar conveyance to himself. Earbury effected his release on bail and the conveyance was then made. According to Martyn, who (finding his own expectations thwarted) painted Earbury's actions in a highly damning light, Earbury did not pay Martyn what he was owed, and refused Eccleston his annuity, with the result that Eccleston was arrested for a debt of £5 and later died in prison. In 1608 Martyn brought suit against Earbury, who by his rejoinder admitted that he owed Martyn £200 but otherwise stayed away from court. In 1609 in a Judgement in Default the Court of Chancery ordered Earbury to pay him this sum with costs, but made no other ruling in the matter. Sir Thomas Coventry, Attorney-General, made a decree in the Exchequer concerning bonds between Sir Richard Martyn and Anthony Earbury in 1624.

Earbury appears as a defendant alongside Sir Valentine Knightley (a member of the Virginia Company in 1611) in a suit brought by Richard Poole touching the disputed manors of Woodmancote, Rentcombe and North Cerney, Gloucestershire, and ownership of the advowson of North Cerney. Valentine Knightley, who died in 1618, had in 1605 presented a petition with Sir Edward Montagu on behalf of 36 deprived Puritan ministers of Northamptonshire, an action which was regarded so severely by the Council that Knightley and Montagu, who refused to withdraw, were stripped of their offices.

== Westonzoyland ==
If Sir Richard Martyn was a formidable disfavoured, his death (in office) on 17 July 1617 eased the way for Earbury's preferment two weeks later (30 July) to the living of Westonzoyland, near Bridgwater in Somerset, in the gift of the extremely influential merchant and royal jeweller Sir Peter Vanlore, to whom King James was heavily indebted both for loans and for the supply of jewellery. Lord De La Warr died in 1618. Earbury's courtly patronage went further, for in 1620 it is recorded that he missed the parish perambulation of Weston because 'hee was then attendinge his lorde the Marquis of Buckingham', from which it is supposed that he was chaplain to the King's favourite, George Villiers. In 1621 he was one of the 28 "respected friends and brethren in the ministry" (sympathetic colleagues among the Somerset clergy) to whom the puritan Richard Bernard of Batcombe, Somerset, dedicated his enlarged handbook for ministers, The Faithfull Shepherd.

At Weston he was a very near neighbour of Sir Thomas Wroth of Petherton Park who, with Lady Wroth's brother Sir Nathaniel Rich was, like Vanlore, invested in the Virginia Company and similar colonial enterprise in the Americas, and sympathetic to the activities of the emigrant ministry. Also a near neighbour, a fellow dedicatee of Bernard's Faithfull Shepherd (one of the six "learned and judicious divines"), was the elder Dr Cudworth, a conforming minister and scholar, rector of Aller, Somerset (under the patronage of Emmanuel College, Cambridge), whose wife was a cousin of Lady Wroth's and probably the granddaughter of Samuel Norden's former patron at Hamsey. Earbury was present with Lady Wroth at Dr Cudworth's deathbed in 1624. John Stoughton, Cudworth's immediate successor at Aller, was a clergyman of millennialist views who engaged closely with Wroth and other promoters of the New England emigration.

At Weston Earbury ran into problems over a house belonging to the vicarage, which a former vicar had leased successively to various people who now laid claims to it, and he was obliged to bring suit against two men whom he thought had combined to defraud him. Earbury's son Matthias meanwhile matriculated at Magdalen Hall, Oxford in 1621, graduating B.A. in February 1624/25, was ordained deacon in September 1626, and took M.A. in June 1627. Anthony lost two patrons as in 1627 Peter Vanlore died, and in 1628 Villiers was assassinated. Matthias, ordained priest in May 1629, became curate to his father at Westonzoyland a month later. It was said at that time that his father had not read a service for a year. In 1630 Matthias was licensed preacher in four jurisdictions.

Mathias's sister Jane, then of Little Trinity, Minories, in London, married Thomas Dymocke of Gray's Inn in December 1631, with her father's consent. Of the Lincolnshire family of the Royal Champions, Thomas Dymock was admitted to Gray's Inn in March 1610 and was father of the agrarian reformer Cressy Dymock (admitted 3 August 1629), to whom Jane Earbury apparently was a youthful stepmother. Cressy Dymock became active in the Hartlib Circle, in which Dr Stoughton also occupied a place. One Thomas Dymocke of this date is said to have emigrated to Barnstable, Plymouth Colony; but Jane, wife of Thomas Dymock, was buried at St Vedast, Foster Lane on 9 September 1691.

The author of the Victoria County History for Somerset suggests that a younger Anthony Earbury succeeded as vicar of Weston in 1629, but most authorities consider the same Anthony to have continued until his death in 1638/39. In 1627 he was witness to the will of John Roze of Lyme Regis, and three years later (December 1630) to that of Roze's son-in-law John Trowbridge the younger of Taunton (son of Mayor John Trowbridge), whose brother Thomas Trowbridge, a mercer in Exeter, emigrated to Dorchester, Massachusetts by 1636 before removing to New Haven, Connecticut in c. 1638.

Between 1630 and 1632, when John Stoughton's brothers Thomas and Israel Stoughton emigrated to Massachusetts (Dr Stoughton himself having declined an invitation to Boston from John Winthrop and John Wilson, taking instead a preaching appointment at St Mary Aldermanbury in London), Earbury's old colleague Stephen Bachiler also began his American career in Saugus, Massachusetts. At Wherwell, where Earbury was still prebendary, he was also not far distant from William Noyes at Cholderton (formerly minister to Lady Wroth's parental household at Leez in Essex), whose sons Nicholas and James Noyes, and nephew Thomas Parker, carried their ministry to New England in 1634. Dr Stoughton's stepson James Cudworth emigrated to Scituate in the same year, and reported on the appointments in the New England townships.

== Sir Edward Powell ==
The installation of William Laud as Archbishop in 1633 set in train the many proceedings in the Court of High Commission against ministers of Puritan sympathy, which dogged Earbury's last years. Letters from Thomas Wroth and James Cudworth, regarded as potentially subversive, were seized from Dr Stoughton, who remained in contact with his associates in Somerset and Dorset, but he and Wroth escaped serious consequences. Sir Edward Powell, Master of Requests, was son-in-law of Peter Vanlore and now lord of the manor of Westonzoyland and patron of the living. The parishioners had long before built a fair Church-house at their own expense, and had employed it for over 100 years for the benefit of the church. (In 1634 it was said to have been used previously as a school.) Powell took possession of it and built a common bakehouse there for his own benefit. Earbury presented a petition about this to Archbishop Laud at his Visitation, as a result of which Powell interrogated Earbury, the churchwardens and sidesmen in the court in Wells.

The patron took advantage of Earbury's known sympathies to denounce him to the court of High Commission as a contumacious minister. A Commission was decreed against him in January to February 1634/35, and through 1635 witnesses were raised against him, examined, and depositions taken. At this time Earbury resigned his tenure as prebend of Wherwell, which was granted to his son Matthias in succession to his father by Cecilia, dowager Lady De La Warr, whose husband Thomas West, 3rd Baron De La Warr had died on a return voyage to Virginia in 1618.

Earbury however brought his petition against Powell, which proceeded to the Court of Star Chamber, showing that Powell, as lord of the manor, was motivated by the intention to deprive him of tithes belonging to the vicarage of Westonzoyland. In May 1636 Earbury made further petition to the Commission that the two matters were interdependent, and should both be deliberated upon by the Bishop of Bath and Wells. This was granted, and in August 1638 Bishop William Piers found in Earbury's favour. The witnesses against Earbury, who were stewards of the manor, were unable or unwilling to agree on the valuation of the arrearages, and the Bishop therefore made his own valuation and ordered Powell to repay the money to Earbury.

The National Archives list a will in the Prerogative Court of Canterbury Registers (Harvey quire) for "Anthony Earbery of Weston Zoyland, Somerset". The will, written in September 1638 and proved on 16 February 1638/39, as found in the register does not refer to Weston Zoyland, and makes provision for two sons, Sackvile and Edward, a daughter Lettice and her child Dinah. The testator is a clerk and he leaves his books to be sold. He makes no reference to Matthias, who was certainly living.
