= John Lonyson =

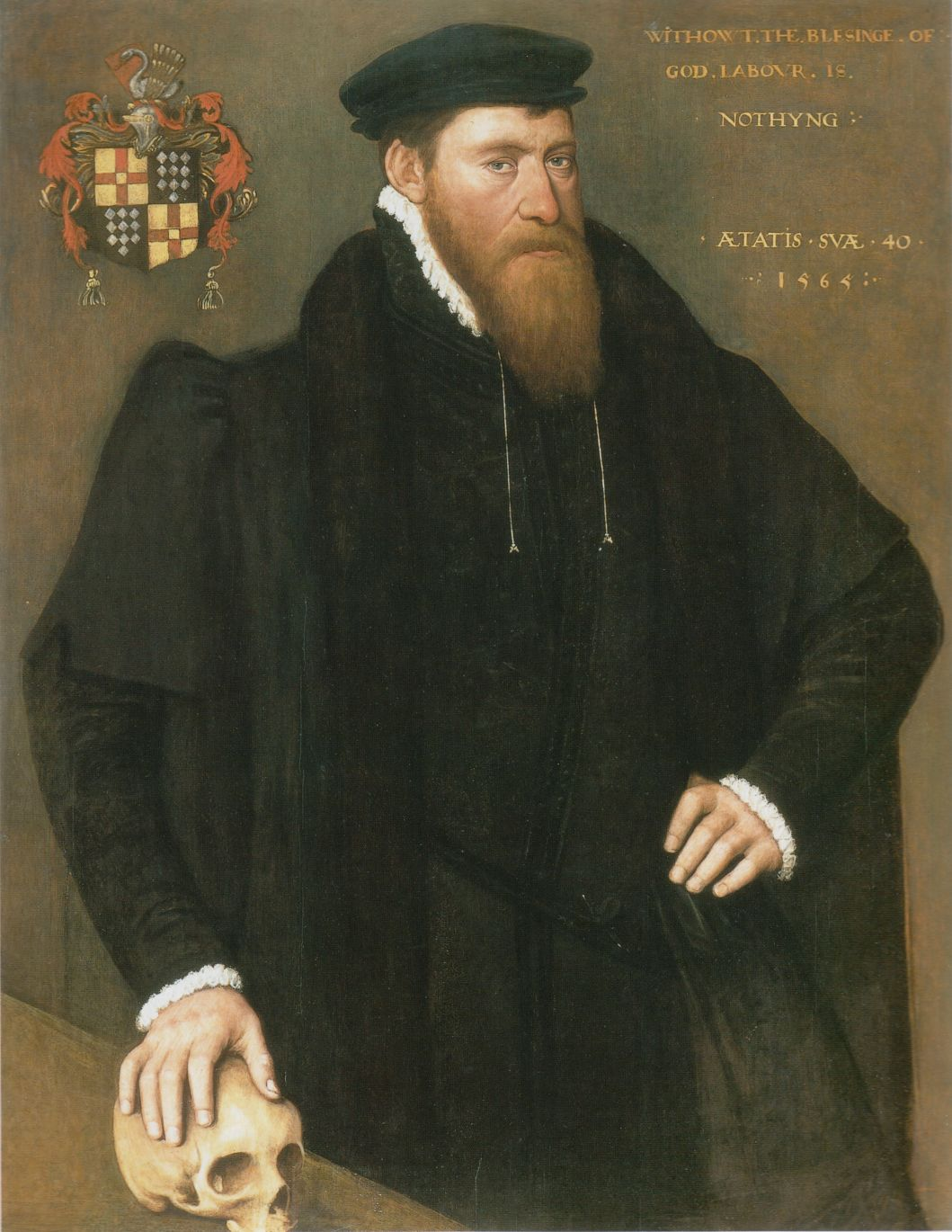
- Lonyson in 1565

Master of the Mint
- In office 1571–1582
- Preceded by: Thomas Stanley
- Succeeded by: Richard Martin

Personal details
- Born: 1525
- Died: 1582 (aged 56–57)
- Resting place: St Vedast Foster Lane, London, England
- Occupation: Goldsmith

John Lonyson or Lonison (1525–1582) was an English goldsmith and Master of the Mint in the reign of Elizabeth I.

John Lonyson was of Flemish descent, one of a family of goldsmiths established In King's Lynn, Norfolk. By 1552, he had completed his apprenticeship in London, and he was admitted as a Liveryman of the Worshipful Company of Goldsmiths in May 1564.

Following the death of Sir Thomas Stanley, Under-Treasurer of the Mint, on 15 December 1571, the management of the Royal Mint was divided between two officers. In April 1572 the crown confirmed Richard Martin, as Warden of the Royal Mint, and John Lonyson as Master-Worker of the Mint. As Master, Lonyson was to accept silver and gold bullion from merchants and goldsmiths and return it in the form of coin, of such denominations, weight, and fineness as were specified in a document called an indenture. In these transactions, a specified portion of the bullion was retained by the Master and Warden for their fees and to cover operating costs.

As is recorded in John Stow's Survey of London, a crisis arose when coins minted under Lonyson's direction were found to be consistently underweight and of less fineness than was prescribed. Lonyson responded that the variances were within the tolerances specified in his indenture and therefore allowable. The purity of the Elizabethan coinage was a matter of great pride to the government after the debased coinages and consequent inflation of the reigns of Henry VIII and Edward VI, and the matter was taken up at the highest levels of the government. The Warden, Richard Martin, raised charges against Lonyson for intentionally reducing both weight and fineness by the maximum amounts allowed under the indenture, against prior custom and for personal profit. The matter was finally weighed in 1578 by a commission of Privy Council members including Nicholas Bacon (the Lord Keeper), William Cecil, Lord Burghley (the Lord Treasurer), Sir Christopher Hatton, the Earls of Leicester and Sussex, Sir Francis Walsingham, and Sir Walter Mildmay. The wording of Lonyson's indenture was imprecise, and he avoided conviction. Ultimately the Council required Lonyson to coin only on short-term commissions that quite specifically established the Master's portion of precious metals at a level higher than the intention of the original indenture but lower than Lonyson's practice of 1572–76. Lonyson accepted the new oversight and was cleared of intentional wrongdoing in his prior practice. He continued to serve in the Royal Mint until his death.

Lonyson died in 1582 and was buried at St Vedast Foster Lane, London, where a monument to him dated 21 May 1583 is recorded in Stow's Survey. Warden Richard Martin himself succeeded Lonyson as Master of the Mint, thus recombining both roles in a single individual.

== Notes ==
Government offices
Preceded by Sir Thomas Stanley	Master of the Mint; 1571–1582	Succeeded by Richard Martin
