= Dorcas Martin =

English bookseller and translator

Dorcas Martin (1537–1599) née Eccleston, Ecclestone or Eglestone was an English bookseller and translator.

== Life ==
Dorcas and her brother John Eccleston were the children of John Eccleston, citizen and Grocer in London, who died in December 1551 leaving property in All Hallows Honey Lane in Westcheap to his son John (then aged 12). He in 1562 having become citizen and Goldsmith granted it away in 1562.

She married the goldsmith Richard Martin, later Lord Mayor of London, sometime before 1562, and they had five sons and one daughter. In 1573 she was the licensed bookseller for Thomas Cartwright's A replye to An answere made of M. doctor Whitgifte, a response to John Whitgift's denunciation of Presbyterianism. She translated a catechism for the use of mother and child that was included in Thomas Bentley's The Monument of Matrones (published in 1582), the first published anthology of English women's writing. Dorcas and her husband were active in radical religious causes including the Admonition Controversy, part of an effort to encourage the queen to further reform Protestantism in England. Her epitaph reads, "Here lyeth Interred the body of Dame DORCAS Martin The late Wife of S^{r} Richard Martin, Knight twise Lord Mayor of the Cittie of London The Davghter of Iohn Ecclestone of ye Covntie of Lancastar gent who had Issve by the said S^{r} Rich Martin V sones, & one davght: and deceased Ovt of this mortall life ye first day of Septemb : 1599."

After her death her brother John Eccleston, who had become a notable figure in the Worshipful Company of Goldsmiths, fell heavily into debt, not least to Sir Richard Martin, and was imprisoned in the Ludgate Prison. To effect his release he conveyed away his title in the priory manor of Elsham, North Lincolnshire, to the puritan minister Anthony Earbury. In 1608 Sir Richard, who had hoped to make the same arrangement for the settlement of Eccleston's debts to him, brought suit against Earbury. Eccleston returned to prison and died there, and Martin received £200 in repayment.

Her son Captain John Martin commanded the Benjamin under Drake in the 1585–1586 expedition. On his return, John Martin married Mary Brandon (born 1566), daughter of Robert Brandon, Chamberlain of London, on 23 May 1586 at St Vedast, Foster Lane. John Martin became a Councilman of the Jamestown Colony of Virginia in 1607 and was the proprietor of Martin's Brandon Plantation on the south bank of the James River, apparently named after his wife's family.

Another son, Richard (died 1616), served with his father as a master-worker at the mint from 1599 to 1607.

Her daughter Dorcas married Sir Julius Caesar, later Chancellor of the Exchequer and Master of the Rolls under James I.

A two-sided silver portrait medallion of Martin and her husband by Steven van Herwijck dated 1562 is in the British Museum. The reverse portrait is inscribed "DORCAS EGLESTONE VX RICHARD MARTIN ÆT 25" (Dorcas Eglestone, wife of Richard Martin, 25 years old).
