= Later life of Isaac Newton =

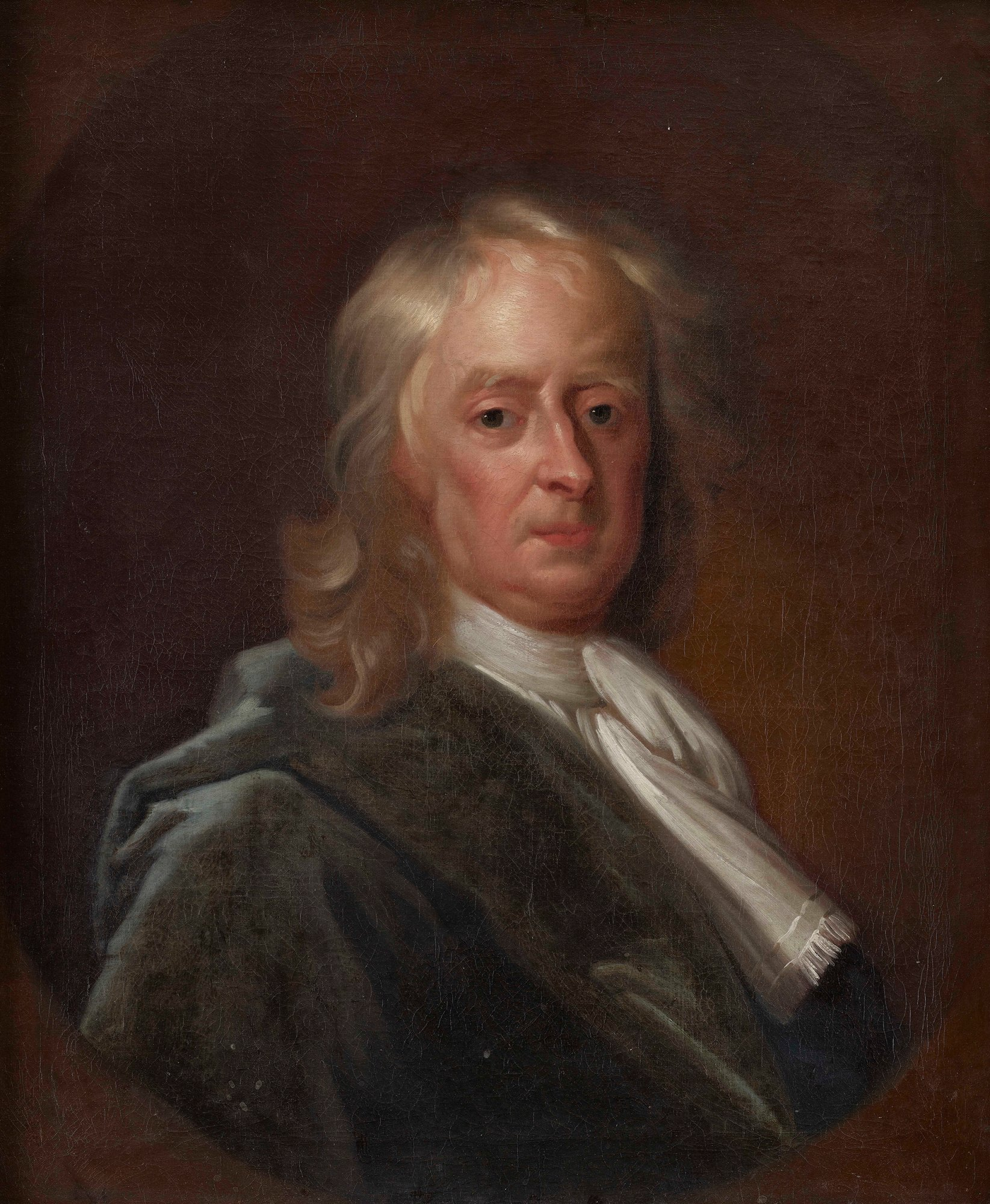
Enoch Seeman's 1726 portrait of Newton.

During his residence in London, Isaac Newton had made the acquaintance of John Locke. Locke had taken a very great interest in the new theories of the Principia. He was one of a number of Newton's friends who began to be uneasy and dissatisfied at seeing the most eminent scientific man of his age left to depend upon the meagre remuneration of a college fellowship and a professorship.

== 1693 ==
During the period 1692–1693 Newton is known to have suffered a breakdown of nervous functioning, or a supposed depression lasting for 18 months, as reported by Huygens. He suffered insomnia and poor digestion, in his letters to friends showing signs of irrationality.

During exhumation the hair from Newton's dead body was found to contain high levels of mercury, remains of desiccated hair were later found to contain four times the lead, arsenic and antimony and fifteen times mercury than in normal range samples. Two hairs contained mercury and separately lead at levels indicating chronic poisoning. Symptoms of mercury poisoning exhibited by Newton were apparently tremor, severe insomnia, delusions of persecution or paranoid ideas, problems with memory, mental confusion, and withdrawal or decline from personal friendships, significant in the period of time, the deterioration of his relations with his protégé Nicolas Fatio de Duillier.

Newton documented the first performed alchemy experiment during 1678, having first obtained furnaces and chemicals in 1669. Experiments with metal included analysis of taste of which there are 108 documented, including mercury:

strong, sourish, ungrateful,

documented also by the scientist were similar experiments with arsenic, gold and lead.

Newton recorded in his notebook of experimenting with chemicals during June 1693. The limited evidence for symptomatic mental illness of Newton during this period stem from correspondences (c.f. The Royal Society) revealing melancholia, desire for withdrawal from relations including his good friends, insomnia, apathy, loss of appetite, delusion of persecution, possibly failures in memory (amnesia), and bipolar. In a letter written to Samuel Pepys, Newton stated he was

extremely troubled by the embroilment I am in, have neither ate nor slept well in the last twelve months, nor have my former consistency of mind. 13th September 1693

On the 30th of that month Newton reported he had been seized by a distemper

that kept him awake for above five nights altogether

== Running the Royal Mint ==
For the last half of Newton's adult life, 30 years, he was warden of the Royal Mint as well as Master of the Mint.

=== Appointment to the Mint ===
Newton got his appointment because of his renown as a scientist and because he supported the winning side in the Glorious Revolution.

At some time Locke nearly succeeded in procuring Newton an appointment as provost of King's College, Cambridge, but the college had offered a successful resistance on the grounds that the appointment would be illegal; its statutes required that the provost should be in priest's orders. Charles Montagu, afterwards Earl of Halifax, was a fellow of Trinity and an intimate friend of Newton, and it was on his influence that Newton relied for promotion to some honourable and lucrative post. However, his hopes were spoiled by long delay. In one of his letters to Locke at the beginning of 1692, when Montagu, Lord Monmouth and Locke were exerting themselves to obtain some appointment for Newton, Newton wrote that he was "fully convinced that Montagu, upon an old grudge which he thought had been worn out, was false to him."

Newton was now 55 years old, and whilst those of his own standing at the university had been appointed to high posts in church or state, he still remained without any mark of national gratitude. Montagu, after being appointed Chancellor of the Exchequer in 1694 finally put this right; he had previously consulted Newton upon the subject of the recoinage, and took the opportunity to appoint Newton to the post of warden of the Royal Mint in 1696. In a letter to Newton announcing the news, Montagu writes: "I am very glad that at last I can give you a good proof of my friendship, and the esteem the king has of your merits. Mr Overton, the warden of the mint, is made one of the Commissioners of Customs, and the king has promised me to make Mr Newton warden of the mint. The office is the most proper for you. 'Tis the chief office in the mint: 'tis worth five or six hundred pounds per annum, and has not too much business to require more attendance than you can spare."

The letter must have convinced Newton of the sincerity of Montagu's good intentions towards him; we find them living as friends on the most intimate terms until Halifax's death in 1715.

=== Achievements and influence ===
Although the post was intended to be a sinecure, Newton took it seriously. By the time of his appointment the currency had been seriously weakened by an increase in clipping and counterfeiting during the Nine Years' War to the extent that it had been decided to recall and replace all hammered silver coinage in circulation. The exercise came close to disaster due to fraud and mismanagement, but was salvaged by Newton's personal intervention. Newton's chemical and mathematical knowledge proved of great use in carrying out this Great Recoinage of 1696, a process that was completed in about two years. Newton was subsequently given the post of Master of the Mint in 1699, a post worth between £1,200 and £1,500 per annum.

Despite counterfeiting being considered high treason, punishable by hanging, drawing and quartering, convicting even the most flagrant criminals could be extremely difficult. Undaunted, Newton conducted more than 100 cross-examinations of witnesses, informers, and suspects between June 1698 and Christmas 1699. He himself gathered much of the evidence he needed to successfully prosecute 28 coiners.

One of Newton's cases as the King's attorney was against William Chaloner. Chaloner's schemes included setting up phony conspiracies of Catholics and then turning in the hapless conspirators whom he had entrapped. Chaloner made himself rich enough to posture as a gentleman. Petitioning Parliament, Chaloner accused the Mint of providing tools to counterfeiters (a charge also made by others). He proposed that he be allowed to inspect the Mint's processes in order to improve them. He petitioned Parliament to adopt his plans for a coinage that could not be counterfeited, while at the same time striking false coins. Newton put Chaloner on trial for counterfeiting and had him sent to Newgate Prison in September 1697. But Chaloner had friends in high places, who helped him secure an acquittal and his release. Newton put him on trial a second time with conclusive evidence. Chaloner was convicted of high treason and hanged, drawn and quartered on 23 March 1699 at Tyburn gallows. Then, he was publicly disemboweled.

Following the 1707 union between the Kingdom of England and the Kingdom of Scotland, Newton used his experience from the English recoinage to direct the 1707-1710 Scottish recoinage, resulting in a common currency for the new Kingdom of Great Britain.

Newton also drew up a very extensive table of assays of foreign coins.

As a result of a report written by Newton on 21 September 1717 to the Lords Commissioners of His Majesty's Treasury the bimetallic relationship between gold coins and silver coins was changed by Royal proclamation on 22 December 1717, forbidding the exchange of gold guineas for more than 21 silver shillings. Due to differing valuations in other European countries this inadvertently resulted in a silver shortage as silver coins were used to pay for imports, while exports were paid for in gold, effectively moving Britain from the silver standard to its first gold standard, rather than the bimetallic standard implied by the proclamation.

Due to his income from the Mint Newton became very wealthy, although he lost a substantial sum in the collapse of the South Sea Bubble. Newton's niece Catherine Conduitt reported that he "lost twenty thousand pounds. Of this, however, he never much liked to hear…" This was a fortune at the time (equivalent to about £4 million in present-day terms), but it is not clear whether it was a monetary loss or an opportunity cost loss.

Newton continued in his position at the Royal Mint until his death in 1727.

== Fluxions ==
Up to the time of the publication of the Principia in 1687 the method of fluxions which had been invented by Newton, and had been of great assistance to him in his mathematical investigations, was still, except to Newton and his friends, a secret. One of the most important rules of the method forms the second lemma of the second book of the Principia. Though this new and powerful method was of great help to Newton in his work, he did not exhibit it in the results. He was aware that the well known geometrical methods of the ancients would make his new creations seem less strange and uncouth to those not familiar with the new method. The Principia gives no information on the subject of the notation adopted in the new calculus, and it was not until 1693 that it was communicated to the scientific world in the second volume of John Wallis's works.

Newton's admirers in the Netherlands informed Wallis that Newton's method of fluxions passed there under the name of Gottfried Leibniz's Calculus Differentials. It was therefore thought necessary that an early opportunity should be taken of asserting Newton's claim to be the inventor of the method of fluxions, and this was why this method first appeared in Wallis's works. A further account was given in the first edition of Newton's Optics (1704).

To this work were added two treatises, entitled Accedunt tractatus duo ejusdem authoris de speciebus & magnitudine figurarum curvilinearum, the one bearing the title Introductio ad Quadratura Curvarum, and the other Enumeratio linearum tertii ordinis. The first contains an explanation of the doctrine of fluxions, and of its application to the quadrature of curves; the second, a classification of 72 curves of the third order, with an account of their properties.

The reason for publishing these two tracts in his Optics, from the subsequent editions of which they were omitted, is thus stated in the advertisement: "In a letter written to Leibniz in the year 1679, and published by Dr Wallis, I mentioned a method by which I had found some general theorems about squaring curvilinear figures on comparing them with the conic sections, or other the simplest figures with which they might be compared. And some years ago I lent out a manuscript containing such theorems; and having since met with some things copied out of it, I have on this occasion made it public, prefixing to it an introduction, and joining a Scholium concerning that method. And I have joined with it another small tract concerning the curvilinear figures of the second kind, which was also written many years ago, and made known to some friends, who have solicited the, making it public."

In 1707 William Whiston published the algebra lectures which Newton had delivered at Cambridge, under the title of Arithmetica Universalis, sive de Compositione et Resolutione Arithmetica Liber. We are not accurately informed how Whiston obtained possession of this work, but it is stated by one of the editors of the English edition "that Mr Whiston, thinking it a pity that so noble and useful a work should be doomed to a college confinement, obtained leave to make it public." It was soon afterwards translated into English by Raphson; and a second edition of it, with improvements by the author, was published at London in 1712, by Dr Machin, secretary to the Royal Society. With the view of stimulating mathematicians to write annotations on this admirable work, Willem Jacob's Gravesande published a tract, entitled Specimen Commentarii in Arithmetican Universalem; and Maclaurin's Algebra seems to have been drawn up in consequence of this appeal.

== Bernoulli's mathematical challenge ==
Newton's solution of the celebrated problems proposed by Johann Bernoulli and Leibniz deserves mention among his mathematical works. In June 1696 Bernoulli addressed a letter to the mathematicians of Europe challenging them to solve two problems:

1. to determine the brachistochrone curve between two given points not in the same vertical line
2. to determine a curve such that, if a straight line drawn through a fixed point A met it in two points P_{1}, P_{2}, then m_{AP_{1}} + m_{AP_{2}} will be constant.

This challenge was first made in the Ada Lipsiensia for June 1696.

Six months were allowed by Bernoulli for the solution of the problem, and in the event of none being sent to him he promised to publish his own. The six months elapsed without any solution being produced; but he received a letter from Leibniz, stating that he had "cut the knot of the most beautiful of these problems", and requesting that the period for their solution should be extended to Christmas next; that the French and Italian mathematicians might have no reason to complain of the shortness of the period. Bernoulli adopted the suggestion, and publicly announced the postponement for the information of those who might not see the Ada Lipsiensia.

On 29 January 1697 Newton returned at 4pm from working at the Royal Mint and found in his post the problems that Bernoulli had sent to him directly; two copies of the printed paper containing the problems. Newton stayed up to 4am before arriving at the solutions; on the following day he sent a solution of them to Montague, then president of the Royal Society for anonymous publication. He announced that the curve required in the first problem must be a cycloid, and he gave a method of determining it. He also solved the second problem, and in so doing showed that by the same method other curves might be found which cut off three or more segments having similar properties. Solutions were also obtained from Leibniz and the Marquis de l'Hôpital; and, although Newton's solution was anonymous, he was recognized by Bernoulli as its author, "comme ex ungue leonem" (Note: Popularly misquoted as "tanquam ex ungue leonem" following David Brewster in his 1831 Life of Sir Isaac Newton. Bernoulli’s original uses the French word "comme" and not the Latin "tanquam". In his June 1697 "Lettre de Mr. Bernoulli à l’Auteur" Bernoulli writes, "nous savons . . . que c’eſt le celebre Monſr. Newton . . . par cet échantillon, comme ex ungue Leonem." (We know . . . that it is the celebrated Mr. Newton . . . by this sample, as by the claw we know the lion.) For more detail, see Whiteside (2008) pp. 9–10, notes (21) and (22).) ("as by the claw [we recognize] the lion").

In 1699 Newton's position as a mathematician and natural philosopher was recognized by the French Academy of Sciences. In that year the Academy was remodelled, and eight foreign associates were created. Leibniz, Domenico Guglielmini (1655—1710), Hartsoeker, and E. W. Tschirnhaus were appointed on 4 February, James Bernoulli and John Bernoulli on 14 February, and Newton and Ole Rømer on 21 February.

== End of professorship and presidency of the Royal Society ==
While Newton held the office of warden of the mint, he retained his chair of mathematics at Cambridge and discharged the duties of the post, but shortly after he was promoted to be master of the mint he appointed Whiston his deputy with "the full profits of the place." Whiston began his astronomical lectures as Newton's deputy in January 1701. On 10 December 1701 Newton resigned his professorship, thereby at the same time resigning his fellowship at Trinity, which he had held with the Lucasian professorship since 1675 by virtue of the royal mandate. Whiston's claims to succeed Newton in the Lucasian chair were successfully supported by Newton himself.

On 11 November 1701 Newton was again elected one of the representatives of the University of parliament, but he retained his seat only until the dissolution in the following July. Newton does not seem to have been a candidate at this election, but at the next dissolution in 1705 he stood for the university. He was warmly supported by the residents, but being a Whig, he was opposed by the non-residents, and beaten by a large majority.

In the autumn of 1703 Lord Somers retired from the presidency of the Royal Society, and on 30 November 1703 Newton was elected to succeed him. Newton was annually re-elected to this honourable post for the remainder of his life. He held the office for 25 years, the longest term of office for any Royal Society president since except Sir Joseph Banks. As president Newton was brought into close association with Prince George of Denmark, the queen's husband, who had been elected a fellow of the Royal Society. The prince had offered, on Newton's recommendation, to cover the expense of printing Flamsteed's Observations—especially his catalogue of the stars. It was natural that the queen should form a high opinion of one whose merits had made such a deep impression on her husband. In April 1705, when the queen, the prince and the court were staying at the royal residence at Newmarket, they paid a visit to Cambridge, where they were guests of Richard Bentley, Master of Trinity College. Her Majesty went in state to the Regent House, where a congregation of the Senate was held, and a number of honorary degrees conferred. Afterwards, the queen held a court at Trinity Lodge, where (16 April 1705) she conferred the order of knighthood upon Sir Isaac Newton.

== Second edition of the Principia ==
As soon as the first edition of the Principia was published Newton began to prepare for a second. He was anxious to improve the work by additions to the theory of the motion of the moon and the planets. Dr Edleston, in his preface to Newton's correspondence with Cotes, justly remarks: "If Flamsteed the Astronomer-Royal had cordially co-operated with him in the humble capacity of an observer in the way that Newton pointed out and requested Of him... the lunar theory would, if its creator did not overrate his own powers, have been completely investigated, so far as he could do it, in the first few months of 1695, and a second edition of the Principia would probably have followed the execution of the task at no long interval."

Newton, however, could not get the information he wanted from Flamsteed, and after the spring of 1696 his time was occupied by his duties at the mint. Rumours, however, of his work, and of a new edition, were heard from time to time. In February 1700 Leibniz writes of Newton, "J'ai appris aussi (je ne sais où) qu'il donnera encore quelque chose sur le mouvement de la Lune: et on m'a dit aussi qu'il y aura une nouvelle édition de ses principes de la nature." (I have learnt - I forget from where - that he will give further details on the movements of the Moon: and I've also been told that there will be a new edition of his Principia).

Dr Bentley, the master of Trinity College, had for a long time urged Newton to give his consent to the republication of the Principia. In 1708 Newton's consent was obtained, but it was not till the spring of 1709 that he was prevailed upon to entrust the superintendence of it to a young mathematician of great promise, Roger Cotes, fellow of Trinity College, who had been recently appointed the first Plumian Professor of Astronomy and Experimental Philosophy. On 21 May 1709, after speaking to Newton, Bentley announced this arrangement to Cotes: "Sir Isaac Newton," he said, "will be glad to see you in June, and then put into your hands one part of his book corrected for the press." About the middle of July Cotes went to London, no doubt expecting to bring down with him to Cambridge the corrected portion of the Principia. Although Cotes was impatient to begin his work, it was nearly the end of September before the corrected copy was given to him.

During the printing of this edition a correspondence went on continuously between Newton and Cotes. On 31 March 1713, when the edition was nearly ready for publication, Newton wrote to Cotes: "I hear that Mr Bernoulli has sent a paper of 40 pages to be published in the Ada Leipsica relating to what I have written upon the curve lines described by projectiles in resisting media. And therein he partly makes observations upon what I have written & partly improves it. To prevent being blamed by him or others for any disingenuity in not acknowledging my oversights or slips in the first edition, I believe it will not be amiss to print next after the old Praefatio ad Lectorem, the following account of this new Edition. "In hac secunda Principiorum Editione, multa sparsim emendantur & nonnulla adjiciuntur. In Libri primi Sect. ii Inventio viriuni quibus corpora in Orbibus datis revolvi possint, facilior redditur et amplior. In Libri secundi Sect. vii. Theoria resistentiac fluidorum accuratius investigatur & novis experimentis confirmatur. In Libro tertio Theoria Lunae & Praecessio Aequinoctiorum ex Principiis suis plenius deducuntur, et Theoria Cometarum pluribus et accuratius computatis Orbium exemplis confirmatur. "28 Mar 1713. I. N. "If you write any further preface, I must not see it, for I find that I shall be examined about it. The cuts for ye Comet of 1680 & 1681 are printed off and will be sent to Dr Bently this week by the Carrier."

Newton's desire to avoid writing the preface seems to have come from a knowledge that Cotes was considering alluding to the dispute about the invention of fluxions. At last, about midsummer 1713, was published the long and impatiently expected second edition of the Principia, and; on 27 July, Newton waited on Queen Anne, to present her with a copy of the new edition.

== The longitude problem ==
In 1714 the question of finding the longitude at sea, which had been looked upon as an important one for several years, was brought into prominence by a petition presented to the House of Commons by a number of captains of Her Majesty's ships and merchant ships and of London merchants. The petition was referred to a committee of the House, who called witnesses. Newton appeared before them and gave evidence. He stated that for determining the longitude at sea there had been several projects, true in theory but difficult to execute. He mentioned four:

1. by a watch to keep time exactly
2. by the eclipses of Jupiter's moons
3. by the place of the moon
4. by a new method proposed by Mr Ditton.

Newton criticized all the methods, pointing out their weak points, and it is due mainly to his evidence that the Committee brought in the report which was accepted by the House, and shortly afterwards was converted into a Bill, passed both Houses, and received the royal assent. The report ran "that it is the opinion of this committee that a reward be settled by Parliament upon such person or persons as shall discover a more certain and practicable method of ascertaining the longitude than any yet in practice; and the said reward be proportioned to the degree of exactness to which the said method shall reach." Newton was in charge of the Board of Longitude, and it never gave a prize, but it did give some advance funds to the mathematician Leonhard Euler and some others for work on accurate lunar tables, and these did more or less solve the longitude problem. Some argue that John Harrison, a developer of clocks, should have received the main prize, but in defense of Newton's decision not to award it, Harrison's work had no effect on maritime navigation. He made a total of four clocks, and at most one of these ever went to sea.

Newton was a very popular visitor at the Court of George I. The Princess of Wales, Caroline of Ansbach, wife of George II, took every opportunity of conversing with him. Having one day been told by Sir Isaac that he had composed a new system of chronology while he was still resident at Cambridge, she requested him to give her a copy. He accordingly drew up an abstract of the system from his papers, and sent it to the Princess for her own private use; but he afterwards allowed a copy to be made for the Abbé Conti on the express understanding that it should not be communicated to any other person. The abbé, however, lent his copy to M Fréret, an antiquary at Paris, who translated it, and endeavoured to refute it. The translation was printed under the title Abrege de chronologie de M le Chevallier Newton, fait par lui-même et traduit sur le manuscrit anglais.

Upon receiving a copy of this work, Newton printed, in the Philosophical Transactions for 1725, a paper entitled "Remarks on the observations made on a Chronological Index of Sir Isaac Newton, translated into French by the observator, and published at Paris." Newton charged the Abbé with a breach of promise, and answered the objections which Fréret had urged against his system. Father Étienne Souciet entered the field in defence of Fréret; and in consequence of this controversy Newton was induced to prepare his larger work, which was published in 1728, after his death, and entitled The Chronology of Ancient Kingdoms Amended.

== Theological studies ==
From an early period in life Newton paid great attention to theological studies, beginning his studies before 1690. That Newton was even then a powerful thinker was proved by his ability to attack the most difficult mathematical problems with success. For example, in 1716 Leibniz, in a letter to the Abbe Conti, proposed a problem for solution "for the purpose of feeling the pulse of the English analysts". The problem was to find the orthogonal trajectories of a series of curves represented by a single equation. Newton received the problem at about 17:00 as he was returning from the mint, and though he was fatigued from work, he solved it later the same evening.

One of the most remarkable of Newton's theological works is his Historical Account of Two Notable Corruptions of the Scriptures, included in a letter to John Locke in November 1690. Sir Isaac was anxious for its publication but because his argument deprived the Trinitarians of two passages in favour of the Trinity, he became alarmed at the possible consequences. He therefore asked Locke, who was on the way to the continent, to have it translated into French and have it published there. Locke copied the manuscript and sent it to Jean Leclerc on 11 April 1691. On 20 January 1692 Leclerc announced his intention of publishing it in Latin. Upon hearing this Newton responded "to stop the translation and publication as soon as he could.. to suppress it". This was done, but Leclerc sent the manuscript to the library of the Remonstrants, and it was later published in London in 1754 under the title Two Letters from Isaac Newton to M le Clerc. This edition had many errors. Dr Horsley therefore published a genuine one, which is in the form of a single letter to a friend, and was taken from a manuscript in Sir Isaac's own hand.

Sir Isaac Newton also wrote Observation on the Prophecies of Daniel and the Apocalypse of St. John which was published in London in 1733. Another work Lexicon Propheticum published in 1737 was a dissertation on the sacred cubit of the Jews. He wrote four letters to Bentley containing arguments for existence of a deity which were published by Cumberland, a nephew of Bentley, in 1756. Newton also wrote a Church History and a History of Creation, Paradoxical Questions regarding Athanasius.

== Final years ==
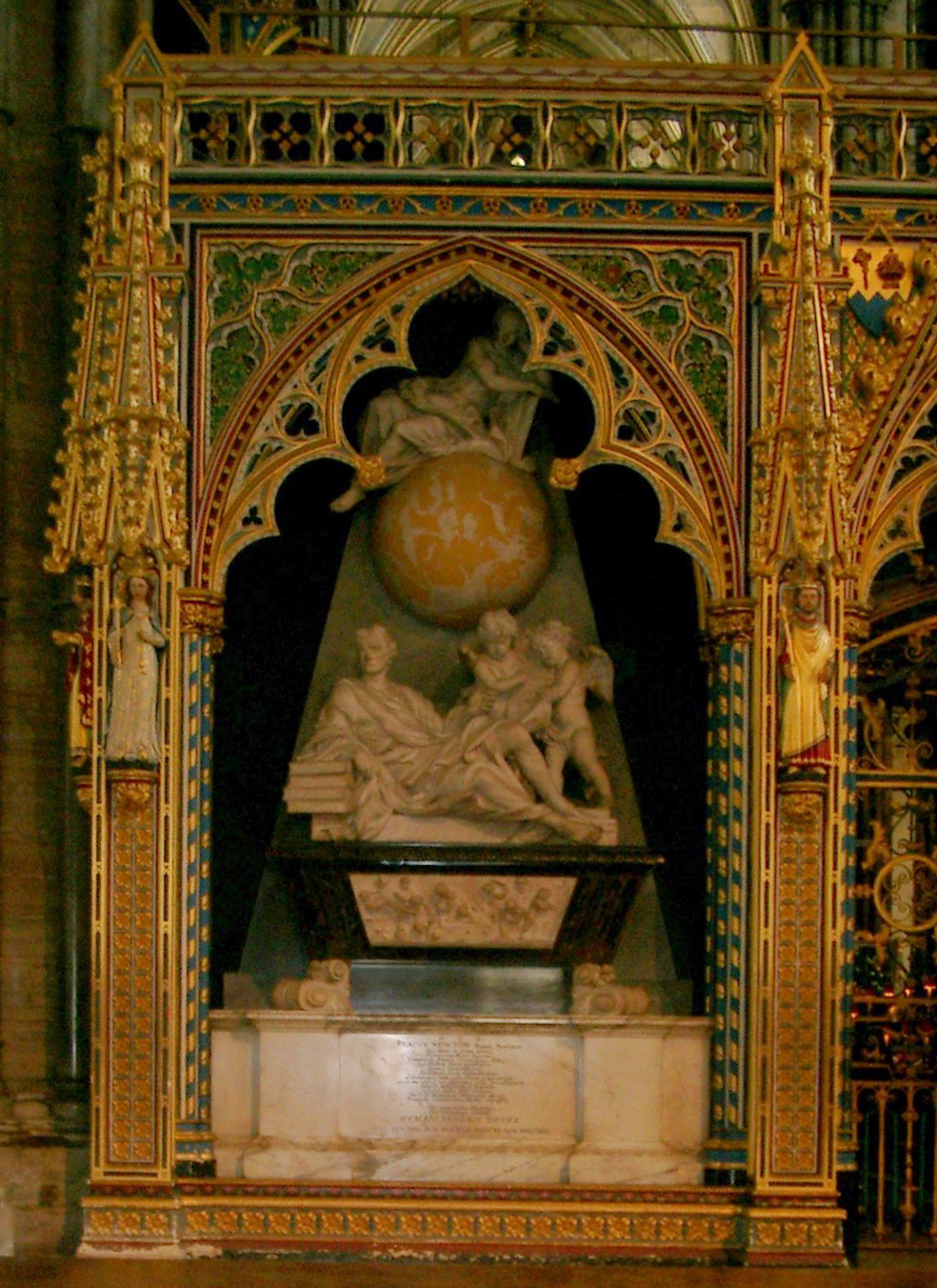
Newton's grave in Westminster Abbey

In the last few years of Newton's life he was troubled by urinary incontinence and urinary tract calculi. In January 1725 he was seized with violent cough and inflammation of the lungs which induced him to move to Kensington. In the next month he had a case of gout and then had an improvement of health. His duties from the mint were terminated and thus he seldom left home. On 28 February 1727 he went to London to preside at a meeting of the Royal Society but his health condition forced him to return to Kensington on 4 March when it was determined he had a gallstone. He endured great suffering. On 18 March he became delirious around 6 pm and stayed in that state until Monday 20 March 1727 when he died between one and two in the morning. His body was taken to London and on Tuesday, 28 March it lay in state in the Jerusalem Chamber in Westminster Abbey, and then was moved to his burial location in the Abbey. (Note: the date of Newton's death is 20 March 1726/27 in the "Old Style" Julian calendar and 31 March 1727 in the "New Style" Gregorian calendar). Voltaire was present at his funeral and praised the British for honoring a scientist of heretical religious beliefs with burial there.

His considerable liquid estate was divided equally between his eight half-nieces and half-nephews — three Pilkingtons, three Smiths and two Bartons (including Catherine Barton Conduitt). Woolsthorpe Manor passed to his heir-in-law, a John Newton ("God knows a poor representative of so great a man"), who, after six years of "cock[fight]ing, horse racing, drinking and folly" was forced to mortgage and then sell the manor before dying in a drunken accident.

Towards the end of his life, Newton took up residence at Cranbury Park, near Winchester with his niece and her husband until his death in 1727. He died in his sleep.

== Sources ==
- Westfall, Richard S. (1980). Never at Rest. Cambridge University Press. ISBN 978-0-521-27435-7.
- Westfall, Richard S. (1994). The Life of Isaac Newton. Cambridge University Press. ISBN 978-0-521-47737-6.
- White, Michael (1997). Isaac Newton: The Last Sorcerer. Fourth Estate Limited. ISBN 978-1-85702-416-6.
