= Andrew Newport =

Andrew Newport may refer to:

- Andrew Newport (MP, died 1699) (1622–1699), English politician and courtier, member of parliament (MP) for Montgomeryshire, for Preston, and for Shrewsbury
- Andrew Newport (MP, died 1611) (1563–1611), English politician, MP for Shrewsbury
- Andrew Newport (City of London MP), 14th-century English courtier, alderman of London and MP for City of London
