= Richard Martin (lord mayor of London) =

English goldsmith (??–1617)

Sir Richard Martin

Warden of the Mint
- In office 1560–1595
- Preceded by: John Browne
- Succeeded by: Thomas Knyvet

Master of the Mint
- In office 1582–1617
- Preceded by: John Lonyson
- Succeeded by: Edward Villiers

Lord Mayor of the City of London
- In office 1589–1589
- Preceded by: Martin Calthrop
- Succeeded by: John Harte

Lord Mayor of the City of London
- In office 1593–1594
- Preceded by: Cuthbert Buckell
- Succeeded by: John Spencer

Personal details
- Died: July 1617 London, England
- Resting place: Tottenham Church, London, England
- Spouse: Dorcas Egleston
- Children: John Martin

Sir Richard Martin (died July 1617 in London) was an English goldsmith and Master of the Mint who served as Sheriff and twice as Lord Mayor of the City of London during the reign of Queen Elizabeth I.

== Early career ==
Richard Martyn's birth is estimated at c. 1534 on the basis of his age given as 28 in a portrait medallion by Steven van Herwijk dated 1562. He was elected a liveryman of the Worshipful Company of Goldsmiths, one of the Livery Companies or craft guilds of the City of London, in 1558. He was elected alderman for the wards of Farringdon Within 1578–1598 and Bread Street 1598–1602. He was Sheriff of London in 1581–1582.

Martin was knighted in 1588–1589 and served a partial year as Lord Mayor in 1589, succeeding Sir Martin Calthrop who had died in office. He was Prime Warden or head of the Goldsmiths' Company 1592–1593, chairing the Court of Wardens or governing body of the company, and served a second term as Lord Mayor in 1593–1594, succeeding Sir Cuthbert Buckell. His other municipal offices included President of Christ's Hospital and Comptroller-General of Hospitals 1594–1602.

Martin was an investor in Sir Francis Drake's 1577–1580 voyage of circumnavigation and also in Drake's 1585–1586 expedition to harass the Spanish ports in the New World.

=== Martin and the Royal Mint ===
Martin was Warden of the Royal Mint by 1572, and was responsible for overseeing the workings of the mint and the quality of the coinage. He supplied metal of specified fineness for gold coins to John Lovyson (Lawinson or Lonison), Master of the Tower Mint in 1577. John Stow in his Survey of London recorded Martin's charges against John Lovyson, a matter that was finally weighed by a commission of Privy Council members including Nicholas Bacon, the Lord Keeper, William Cecil, Lord Burghley, the Lord Treasurer, and others, which recommended that

it likewise please her Majesty to give a Discharge unto Richard Martin, now Warden of the Mint, for to reckon and pass the said Lonison's Accompt [account] in form afore-declared. Which Martin they do not find to have done any Thing in this Controversy thereby to have any particular Gain to himself; but the whole Matters alleged by him to have tended to her Majesty's Service; and for discharging of his Duty belonging to the Office.

Martin himself succeeded Lovyson as Master of the Mint in 1582, serving in that capacity until his death in 1617.

== Making and selling silver plate ==
Martin supplied silver plate to the queen's privy kitchen in 1583, including a great standing cup gilt, with a cover, the body garnished with "sundry vermin as snakes ewetes (newts) frogs and others", and laid with colours, the cover garnished with sundry men and beasts hunting with a stag at the top. This cup, probably made in Germany, was admired in the Tower of London by Lupold von Wedel in November 1584. It was a gift at the baptism of Prince Henry in August 1594.

He provided silver plate for the use of Mary, Queen of Scots, including a silver gilt bowl and cover in 1585, decorated with an engraved pattern of fish.

In 1589 Martin supplied silver plate, silks, and other goods to the value of £2,000 which Elizabeth gave to James VI of Scotland for the reception of Anne of Denmark. James VI took some of this silver plate to Oslo and presented it to the Danish councillors Steen Brahe and Axel Gyldenstierne. In 1591 Martin and Hugh Kayle supplied Queen Elizabeth with silver plate worth £2,213, some plate was for New Year's Day gifts and some for christening gifts.

In 1597 a thief stole a silver inkstand and silver bowls belonging to Elizabeth I from Theobalds. Martin helped track down the dealers and goldsmiths who bought the stolen silver. John Williams, a successful Welsh-born goldsmith, was his apprentice in 1584.

== Marriage and family ==
Richard Martin married Dorcas Ecclestone (1537-1599) sometime before 1562. Martin had a silver medal with their portraits made to commemorate their marriage. The medal was designed by Steven Corneliszoon van Herwijck who was working in London in 1562.

They had five sons and one daughter.

Both Martins were active in radical religious causes including the Admonition Controversy, part of an effort to encourage the queen to further reform Protestantism in England.

The country house at Highgate later known as Lauderdale House was built for him in 1582.

The Martins' son Captain John Martin commanded the Benjamin under Drake in the 1585–1586 expedition. On his return, John Martin married Mary Brandon (born 1566), daughter of Robert Brandon, Chamberlain of London, on 23 May 1586 at St Vedast, Foster Lane. John Martin became a Councilman of the Jamestown Colony of Virginia in 1607 and was the proprietor of Martin's Brandon Plantation on the south bank of the James River, apparently named after his wife's family.

Another son, Richard (died 1616), served with his father as a master-worker at the mint from 1599 to 1607.

Their daughter Dorcas married Sir Julius Caesar, later Chancellor of the Exchequer and Master of the Rolls under James I.

== The house in Cripplegate ==
In March 1595 Martin raided the house of Edmund Williamson in Philip Lane, Cripplegate, after his brother Nicholas Williamson was arrested for treason. Martin discovered that Edmund Williamson ran a kind of pawnbroking business from his house, obtaining luxury goods from young men for small sums, less than their worth. Nicholas Skeres, an associate of Christopher Marlowe involved in the credit racket, was taken by Martin and held for a few days.

== Late life ==
Martin had remained both Warden and Master of the Mint for almost two decades, but following charges in 1597 that he was profiteering by delaying repayments he sold his office of Warden to Sir Thomas Knyvet. The two soon fell out, with Knyvet accusing Martin of owing the crown substantial funds and Martin insisting he was owed. Martin was briefly imprisoned for debt, which led to his removal from his Aldermanry on 31 August 1602 on account of his "unfitting demeanour and carriage". Suits and countersuits continued, with the Exchequer finding against Martin in 1607 and a further enquiry finding in his favour in 1615.

In 1608 Martin asked to be involved in the assay of silver ore sent to the Tower Mint from Hilderston in Scotland. He sent a report of the assay and chemical opinions offered by his workmen to the Earl of Salisbury in October.

Richard Martin died in July 1617, and was buried in Tottenham Church, 30 July 1617. At his death he "was held near a hundred years old". His wife Dorcas had been buried in the same church on 2 September 1599, and his son Richard on 28 May 1616.

== Notes ==
Civic offices
Preceded by Martin Calthorp	Lord Mayor of the City of London; 1589	Succeeded by John Harte
Preceded by Cuthbert Buckell	Lord Mayor of the City of London; 1593–1594	Succeeded by John Spencer
Government offices
Preceded by John Browne	Warden of the Mint; 1560–1595	Succeeded by Thomas Knyvet, 1st Baron Knyvet
Preceded by John Lonyson	Master of the Mint; 1582–1617	Succeeded by Sir Edward Villiers
