= Steven van der Meulen =

English painter

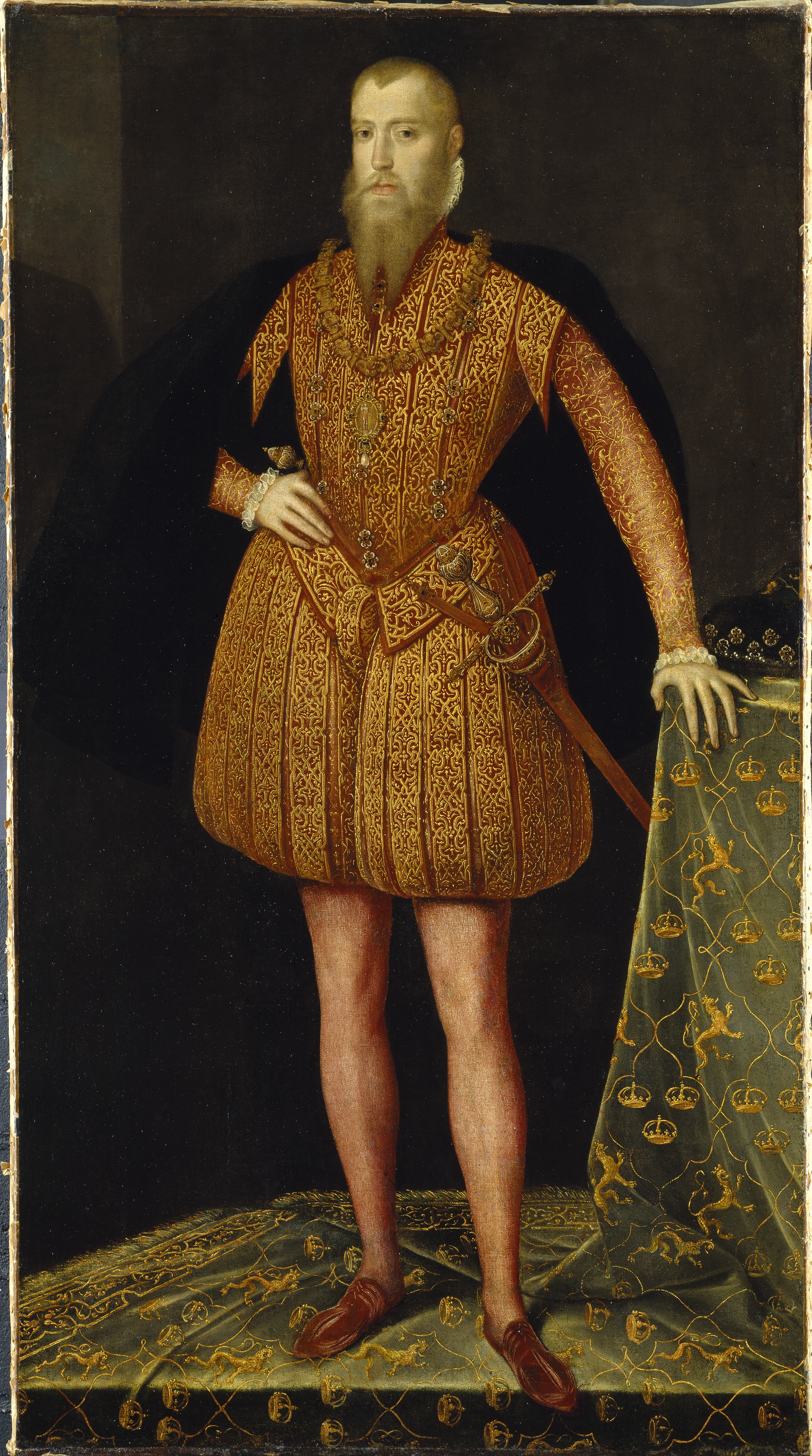
Erik XIV of Sweden, by Steven van der Meulen, 1561

Steven van der Meulen (born in Antwerp; buried in London, 24 October 1563) was a Flemish artist active c. 1543–1563. He gained prominence in England in the first decade of the reign of Elizabeth I as one of many Flemish artists active at the Tudor court.

== Life ==
Little is known about van der Meulen's early life. His father was Rinnold (or Rumold) van der Meulen. He was probably born in Antwerp, where he studied under Willem van Cleve the Younger in 1543 and was admitted to the Guild of St Luke in 1552. He was in London by September 1560, is recorded as a member of the Dutch congregation there in June 1562, and was naturalized (denisized) on 4 February 1562.

In 1561 the English merchant John Dymocke or Dymoch visited Sweden in connection with negotiations for a marriage between Elizabeth and Erik XIV, taking with him a Netherlandish painter (holländsk Konterfegare) described as 'Master Staffan' to paint the portrait of the King. Dymocke, a former usher to Henry VIII, was a jewel merchant who showed patterns for jewels to Elizabeth I and Kat Ashley. He was married to Beatrice van Cleve, a woman from Antwerp. It is generally accepted that the painter "Staffan" who accompanied Dymocke was Steven van der Meulen. In 1935, W. G. Constable identified this portrait with a full-length of Erik XIV at Gripsholm Castle, Mariefred, near Stockholm.

Scholar Elizabeth Drey discovered van der Meulen's will, dated 5 October 1563 during an epidemic of the plague in London and proved on 20 January 1564. His will indicates that his wife Gertrude Stubbeleeren (or Stubbeleren) and children Rinnold (or Rumold) and Eric were resident in London with him at the time of his death. His daughter Elizabeth had been buried 22 September 1563 and so does not appear in the will. His son Rinnold was buried 15 October and his wife on 18 October. Steven van de Meulen died soon after; he was buried at St Andrew Undershaft on 24 October 1563.

== Works ==
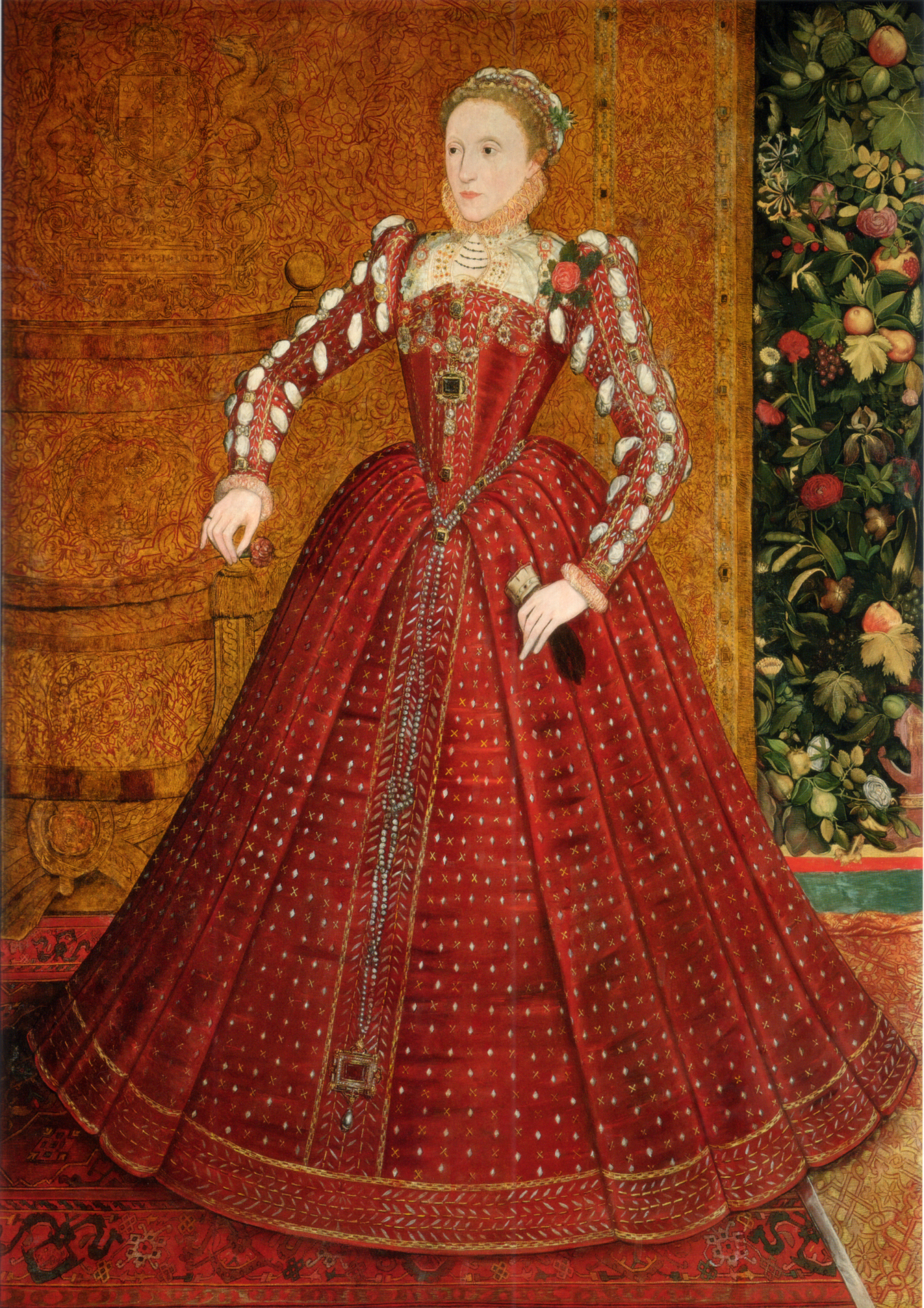
The Hampden portrait of Elizabeth I, formerly attributed to Steven van der Meulen

Many works confidently attributed to van der Meulen by Sir Roy Strong and others from the 1960s through the mid-2000s must be reevaluated in the light of the discovery that he died in 1563.

These include a portrait pattern of Queen Elizabeth dating to the mid-1560s. Called by Strong the "Barrington Park" type after a representative example, these sophisticated portraits are probably a response to a proclamation of 1563, which was designed to counter the existence of many unflattering images of the Queen. A life-size (2 m or 7 ft) portrait of this type c. 1563, identified as the earliest full-length portrait of Elizabeth and possibly associated with the various marriage negotiations of the early 1560s, was auctioned by Sotheby's as by van der Meulen in November 2007 for £2.6 million, more than twice its expected price of £700,000–£1 million.

== Question of identity ==
The discovery of van der Meulen's 1563 will and burial records raised questions about the traditional identification of van de Meulen with the "famous paynter Steven" recorded in the 1590 inventory of the paintings of John Lumley, 1st Baron Lumley and with Dymocke's "Master Staffan". In the Spring 2009 issue of The British Art Journal Bendor Grosvenor proposed an alternative identification of the painter "Steven" with the medallist Steven van Herwijck. This new identification was accepted by a number of institutions, such as Historic Royal Palaces, Tate Britain and the V&A, who exhibited the full-length Hampden portrait of Elizabeth I as attributed to van Herwijck. In her 2014 study of the portraiture and patronage of Robert Dudley, 1st Earl of Leicester, Elizabeth Goldring raised concerns with identification of van Herwijck as the "paynter Steven". This identification is also rejected by Edward Town in his A Biographical Dictionary of London Painters, 1547–1625 (2014):

Although there is no denying that there were links between Steven van Herwijck and the Dymock family, this does not necessarily mean that van Herwijck was the 'Master Staffan' who travelled to Sweden in early 1561. In fact, the sequence of events that followed the Swedish embassy fits better with what we know of Steven van der Meulen's subsequent career in England than that of van Herwijck.

Dendrochronological study of the portrait of John Lumley in the National Portrait Gallery reveals that the painting is correctly dated to the 1570s or 1580s, after the documented deaths of both van der Meulen and van Herwijck. Of the identification of the painter, the NPG says "The style of painting is consistent with an Anglo-Netherlandish artist from this period.... However, as both van der Meulen and van Herwijck died in the 1560s the artist responsible for NPG 5262 must remain as an as yet unidentified émigré".

In 2020, Edward Town attributed the Hampden portrait of Elizabeth I, now dated ca. 1567, and several others formerly attributed to van der Meulen, to George Gower, Elizabeth's Serjeant painter.
