= Steven van Herwijck =

Netherlandish sculptor

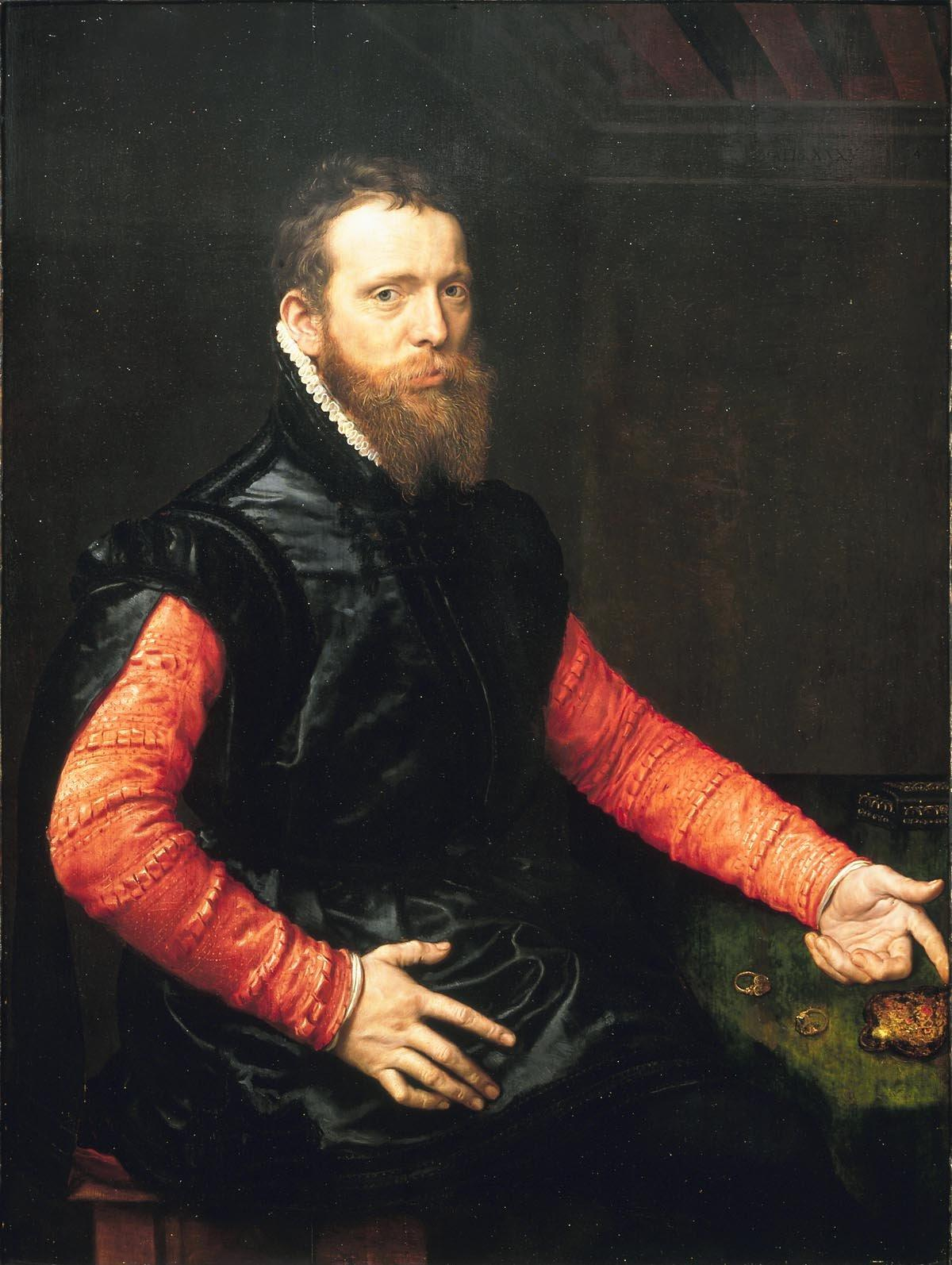
Steven van Herwijck by Antonis Mor, 1564. Now in the Mauritshuis, The Hague.

Steven Cornelisz. van Herwijck (Utrecht c. 1530–London 1565/67), was a Netherlandish sculptor and gem engraver famous for his portrait medallions and medals. He spent two periods of his career in England, where he died. It has recently been suggested that he is the "famous paynter Steven" mentioned in an inventory of 1590, who has traditionally been identified as Steven van der Meulen.

== Life ==
Van Herwijck worked in Italy in 1557 and returned to Utrecht in 1558, when he was made a Master of the artists' guild, then in fact the saddlemaker's guild, which Utrecht artists shared, rather than having their own Guild of St. Luke. His earliest surviving medals, of George van Egmond, Bishop of Utrecht, and Engelken Tols, date from this year. In 1559 he relocated to Antwerp. Nine medals survive of his work there, including a portrait of Jacobus Fabius. Fleeing religious persecution, he went to Poland in 1561 where he made medallions of King Sigismund II Augustus and other members of the Polish royal family.

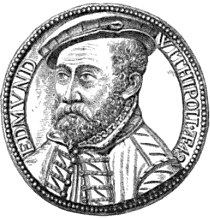
Portrait medal of Edmund Withipoll, 1562

In 1562 he travelled to England, where he produced the first portrait medals of private individuals to be made in that country. These portray William Parr, 1st Marquess of Northampton and his wife Elizabeth Brooke, Marchioness of Northampton; William Herbert, 1st Earl of Pembroke (1501–1570); Anne Heneage (wife of Thomas Heneage); Thomas Stanley, Under-Treasurer of the Royal Mint; Richard Martin, Lord Mayor of London, and his wife Dorcas Eglestone or Eccelstone; Edmund Withypoll; and Maria Dimock or Dymock, wife of the merchant John Dymock.

In 1564, van Herwijck was back in the Netherlands, spending time in both Utrecht and Antwerp. Antonis Mor's Portrait of a Goldsmith, identified as van Herwijck, is dated 1564 and it is likely that a portrait medallion of Mor by van Herwijck dates to this period. The Mor portrait may mark van Herwijck's marriage; a portrait of his wife Jonekin by Mor of the same date is in the Hunterian Museum and Art Gallery in Glasgow. Van Herwijck returned to London in 1565, where he struck a medal of Queen Elizabeth, of which the only surviving example was unearthed in a ploughed field in 1962; it is now in the National Portrait Gallery, London. His medallion of the French ambassador Michel de Castelnau is also dated 1565. He died in London sometime before Easter 1567, leaving his widow Jonekin or Johane and children.

== Identification ==
=== Stephen of Holland ===
Van Herwijk's medals are typically signed "Ste. H." or "Ste. H. F.", and the 18th century English engraver and antiquary George Vertue speculated that these initials stood for "Stephen of Holland made this" (in Latin, Stephanus Hollandus fecit). In 1922 Victor Tourneur showed that the medallist "Ste H." could be identified with the Steven van Herwijck born in Utrecht around 1530.

=== "The famous paynter Steven" ? ===
The 1590 inventory of the paintings in the collection of John Lumley, 1st Baron Lumley refers to a number of works dated to the early 1560s by "the famous paynter Steven". Sir Roy Strong and others identified this "Steven" with the Flemish artist Steven van der Meulen and suggested a body of works roughly dated 1560–1568. The recent discovery of van der Meulen's will dated 1563 and proved in 1564 has raised questions about this traditional identification, and in the Spring 2009 issue of The British Art Journal Bendor Grosvenor proposed an alternative identification of the painter "Steven" with van Herwijck. This new identification was accepted by a number of institutions, such as Tate Britain and the V&A, who exhibited a portrait of Elizabeth I as attributed to van Herwijck. In her 2014 study of the portraiture and patronage of Robert Dudley, 1st Earl of Leicester, Elizabeth Goldring raises concerns with identification of van Herwijck with the "paynter Steven" This identification is also rejected by Edward Town in his A Biographical Dictionary of London Painters, 1547–1625 (2014):

Although there is no denying that there were links between Steven van Herwijck and the Dymock family, this does not necessarily mean that van Herwijck was the 'Master Staffan' who travelled to Sweden in early 1561. In fact, the sequence of events that followed the Swedish embassy fits better with what we know of Steven van der Meulen's subsequent career in England than that of van Herwijck.

Dendrochronological study of the portrait of John Lumley in the National Portrait Gallery reveals that the painting is correctly dated to the 1570s or 1580s, after the documented deaths of both van der Meulen and van Herwijck. Of the identification of the painter, the NPG says "The style of painting is consistent with an Anglo-Netherlandish artist from this period.... However, as both van der Meulen and van Herwijck died in the 1560s the artist responsible for NPG 5262 must remain as an as yet unidentified émigré".

== Works ==
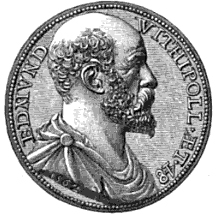
Edmund Withipoll in a toga, 1562

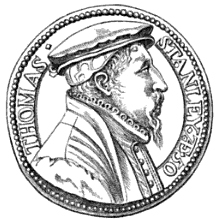
Thomas Stanley (obverse), 1562

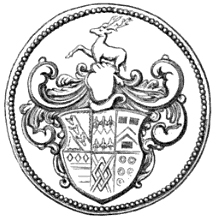
Thomas Stanley (reverse), with his coat of arms, 1562

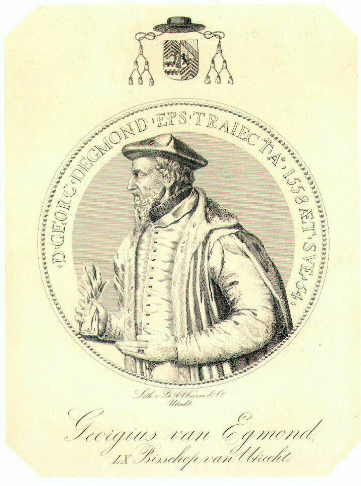
Mid-19th century lithographic print after medal of George van Egmond, 1558.

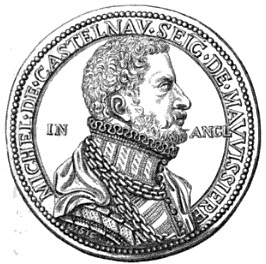
Michel de Castelnau
