= John Dymocke =

John Dymocke or Dymock (1492–1585) was an English courtier, merchant, and message-bearer.

== Career ==
Dymocke was a gentleman usher to Henry VIII. He was probably a relative of Sir Robert Dymoke of Scrivelsby, the King's Champion. He developed business links in Antwerp as a cloth merchant and shipowner, and married Beatrice van Cleve, daughter of Jan van Cleve. Their children included a son, also called John. In 1557, he hosted the Russian ambassador Osep Gregorovitch Napea.

John Dymocke had a licence to import jewels. He discussed patterns drawn on parchment with Kat Ashley and Elizabeth I. Elizabeth was interested in a jewel with a large ruby and pearl pendant, and Dymocke claimed she jokingly said the King of Sweden would buy it for her. Elizabeth, according to Dymocke, said he was an old man to be planning long journeys, and granted him a passport. Dymock went to Sweden in 1561 with a portrait painter, Master Staffan, probably Steven van der Meulen. He gave Eric XIV a pair of perfumed gloves, and discussed jewels and Elizabeth's marriage plans, although he was not an accredited diplomat and was arrested and questioned on his return to London.

He seems to be the "John Dimock", a merchant draper who had served Henry VIII and Edward VI, who died on 14 July 1585 aged 93 and was buried at St Margaret Lothbury.
