= Andrew Newport (City of London MP) =

Member of the Parliament of England

Andrew Newport was a 14th-century English courtier, alderman of London and Warden of the Mint in the reign of Richard II.

Newport was a Serjeant-at-arms from 1385 until at least 1394. He was an Esquire of the Body to Richard II and was rewarded for his services by being made Warden of the Mint in 1392. From 1395 he was also Keeper of the King's gold and silver dies at the Tower and at Canterbury. He became Collector of the wool custom and subsidy in London from 1397.

He was a member of the Fishmongers' Company, became the Alderman for Aldersgate in 1397 and in the same year represented the City of London in Parliament as one of the two aldermanic representatives. He also served for 2 years as High Sheriff of Cambridgeshire and Huntingdonshire from 1397 to 1399, having bought land in the Cambridgeshire village of Fulbourn.

He lost all his positions on the overthrow of King Richard in 1399.

He and his wife Margaret had died before 1408.
