= Warden of the Mint =

Official of the British Mint

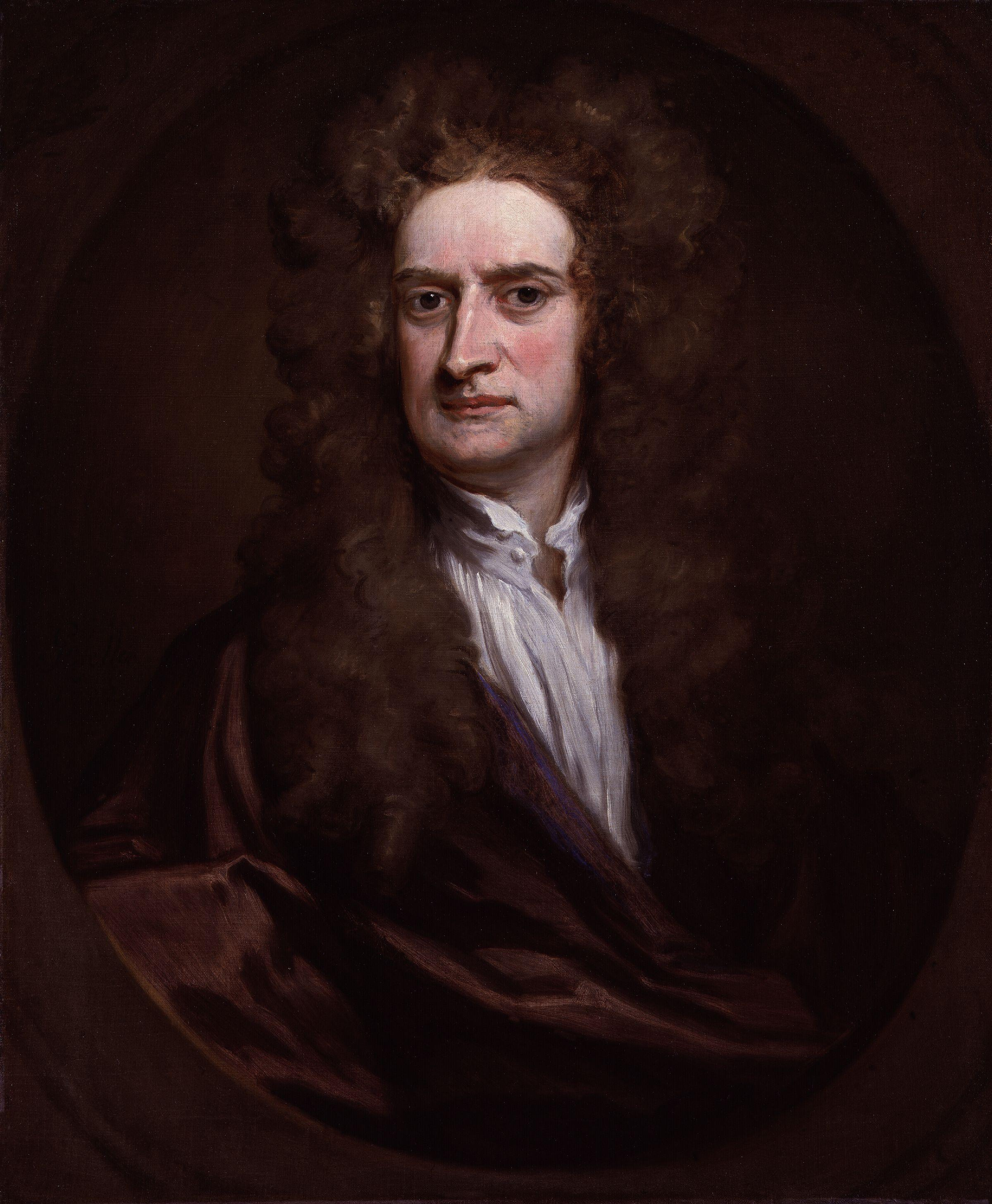
Isaac Newton, Warden of the Mint from 1696–1699

Warden of the Mint was a high-ranking position at the Royal Mint in England from 1216 to 1829. The warden was responsible for a variety of minting procedures and acted as the immediate representative of the current monarch inside the mint. The role of warden changed greatly through history with the original task being the receiving, assay and payment for bullion, while later evolving into more of an administerial role.

The office received a yearly emolument of £500. Up until 1685, wardens were given tenure: many of them died while in office. Although technically subordinate to the Master of the Mint whose job was act as a contractor to the crown, many wardens advanced later on to become Master of the Mint with some wardens holding both offices at the same time.

The most illustrious holder of the office of Warden of the Mint was Isaac Newton, who was warranted to this position on the recommendation of his friend, Charles Montagu, Chancellor of the Exchequer in 1696. In 1699 however, Newton undertook the office of Master of the Mint, which was far more lucrative, as well as potentially more technically challenging. After the death in 1829 of the final warden, Sir Walter James, 1st Baronet, the office was abolished having existed for 613 years.

== Warden of the Mint ==
Tenure		Notes
1193	Henry de Cornhill	
1197	Odo Parvus and others	
1202	Hugh Oisel	
1203	Wido de Vou	
1204	Hugh Oisel	
1208	Nigel Ruffus and Odo Varvus	
1216–1222	Hubert de Berg	
1222	Hger	
1224	Alexander	
1229	Riehard Reinger	London and Canterbury
1243	Otto Fitz William	
1245	William Hardel	London and Canterbury
1247	Walter de Flemeng	
1248	William Hardel Walter de More	London and Canterbury
1251	J. Silvestre	
1252	J. de Somercote	
1258	William the King's Goldsmith	London and Canterbury
1266	B. de Castell and Richard de Geoffrey	
1270–1279	Bartholomew de Castello	
1279–1292	Gregory de Rokesley	Shared Role
1279–1281	Orlando di Poggio	Shared Role
1292–1296	William of Wymondham	
1297–1298	Peter of Leicester	
1298–1305	John Sandale	
c1319	Augustine le Waleys	
1331	Richard de Snowshill	
c1337	John de Wyndsore	
1343	George Kirkyn, Lotte Nicholyn	
1334	William of Wakefield	
1334	John of Fleet	
1346	George Kirkyn, Lotte Nicholyn	
1349	John Donati de Castello, Philip John de Neri, Benedict Isbari	(killed 1381)
1375–1376	Richard Lyons	Executed on 14 June 1381 during the Peasants' Revolt
1376–1377	Thomas Hervey	
1377–1388	John Gurtmonchester	
1389–1392	Guy Rocliffe	
1392–1399	Andrew Newport	
1399–1403	Robert Heathcote	
1408–1411	David de Nigarellis of Lucca	
1411–1439	Henry Somer	
1439–1446	John Somerset	
1446–1449	John Lematon	
1449–1468	Thomas Montgomery	
1468–1470	John Wode	
1470–1471	John Langstrother	Joint Wardens both executed Tewkesbury 1471
1471-1471	Sir John Delves	Joint Wardens both executed Tewkesbury 1471
1471	John Wode	(re-instated)
1534–1536	Sir Thomas Pope	
1536–1544	John Browne	
1560–1595	Sir Richard Martin	Acted as Master of the Mint from 1581-1617
1599–1609	Thomas Knyvet, 1st Baron Knyvet	
1609–1621	Thomas Knyvet, 1st Baron Knyvet and Edmund Doubleday	
1621	Henry Tweedy	
1623	Sir Edward Villiers Sir William Parkhurst	died 1626
1626-1629	Sir William Parkhurst	
1629–1642	Sir William Parkhurst and Sir Anthony St Leger	
1642–1645	Holland	(appointed by Parliament)
1645-1660	John St John	(appointed by Parliament)
1660–1666	Sir William Parkhurst jointly with Sir Anthony St Leger	
1666–1680	Sir Anthony St Leger	died 1680
1681	Sir Thomas Wharton (died 1684) and son Philip Wharton	
1685–1686	Sir Philip Lloyd	
1686–1690	Owen Wynne	
1690	Benjamin Overton	
1696–1699	Sir Isaac Newton	Promoted to Master of the Mint in 1699
1700	Sir John Stanley, 1st Baronet	
1708–1714	Craven Peyton	Appointed in April 1708 and removed from office in December 1714
1714	Sir Richard Sandford, 3rd Baronet	
1718	William Thompson	
1725	Walter Cary	
1727	Sir Andrew Fountaine	
1754	Richard Herbert (died 1754)	
1754	John Jeffreys	
1766	William Whitmore	
1771	Sir Robert Pigot, 2nd Baronet	
1796–1829	Sir Walter James, 1st Baronet (the last Warden; he died in 1829)	
1829	Office abolished	

== See also ==
- Münzwardein
- Master of the Mint

== Bibliography ==
- Challis, C.E (1989). Mint Officials and Moneyers of the Stuart Period (PDF). British Numismatic Society.
- Challis, C.E (1992). A New History of the Royal Mint. Cambridge: Cambridge University Press. ISBN 978-0521240260.
- Clark, Linda (2014). The Fifteenth Century XIII: Exploring the Evidence: Commemoration, Administration and the Economy. Boydell Press. ISBN 978-1843839446.
- Craig, John (1953). The Mint: A History of the London Mint from A.D. 287 to 1948. Cambridge: Cambridge University Press. ISBN 978-0521170772.
- Ruding, Rogers (1840). Annals of the coinage of Great Britain and its dependencies. London.
- Sharpe, James (2016). A Fiery & Furious People: A History of Violence in England. Random House Books. p. 60. ISBN 978-1847945136.
