= John Browne (died 1570) =

Member of the Parliament of England

John Browne II (by 1513 – 1570), of London and Horton Kirby, Kent, was Warden of the Mint and MP for Aldborough.

John Browne was the son of Sir William Browne, mercer and Lord Mayor of London, of Flambards Hall, Essex, by his second wife, Alice Keble (d. 8 June 1521), the daughter of Henry Keble (1452 – April 1517), Lord Mayor of London, and Joan Bryce. He had a sister, Anne (d. 10 March 1582), who married firstly John Tyrrell (d. 1540) of Heron, Essex, and secondly Sir William Petre (1505 – 13 January 1572) of Ingatestone Hall, Essex, as well as another brother, Matthew, and sister, Elizabeth, about whom nothing further is known.

Browne was appointed Warden of the Mint in 1536 (until 1544), and was surveyor of the mint thereafter. He was a Member (MP) of the Parliament of England for Aldborough in 1558. He was appointed Sheriff of London in 1552, but was excused office on payment of a fine.

He established his home at Horton Kirby in Kent.
