= Master of the Mint =

Head of the Mint in Commonwealth countries

Master of the Mint is a title within the Royal Mint given to the most senior person responsible for its operation. It was an office in the governments of Scotland and England, and later Great Britain and then the United Kingdom, between the 16th and 19th centuries. Until 1699, the appointment was usually for life. Its holder occasionally sat in the cabinet.

During the interregnum (1643–1660), the last Master of the Mint to Charles I, Sir Robert Harley, transferred his allegiance to Parliament and remained in office. After his death in 1656, Aaron Guerdon was appointed.

In 1870 the role was amalgamated into the office of the Chancellor of the Exchequer, making the Chancellor, by virtue of his position, the Master of the Mint. The duty of running the mint was given to the Deputy Master of the Mint; who is now the mint's Chief Executive.

== Masters of the Mint in England ==
- 1331 - ? Richard de Snowshill and Richard of Grimsby
- 1351 - ? Henry de Bruselee and John Chichester
- 1361 - 1361 Walter dei Bardi
- 1365 - 1367 John Chichester
- 1375 - 1391 Walter dei Bardi
- 1391 - 1391 John Wildeman
- 1411 - 1414 Richard Garner
- 1413 - 1414 Sir Lewis John
- 1418 - 1420 Sir Lewis John
- 1421 - 1432 Bartholomew Goldbeter
- 1435 - 1446 John Paddesley
- 1446 - 1459 Robert Manfield
- 1459 - 1461 Sir Richard Tonstall
- 1461 - 1483 William Hastings (executed 1483)
- 1483 - 1485 Sir Robert Brackenbury (killed at Bosworth, 1485)
- 1485 - 1490 Sir Giles Daubeney
- 1492 - 1493 Sir Bartholomew Reade and Sir John Shaa
- 1493 - 1494 Sir Bartholomew Reade and Robert Fenrother
- 1495 - 1498 Sir Bartholomew Reade and Sir John Shaa
- 1509 - 1534 William Blount, 4th Baron Mountjoy
- 1543 - 1544 Ralph Rowlet and Sir Martin Bowes
- 1544 - ? Sir Martin Bowes
- 1547 - 1553 Sir John York
- 1553 - 1555 Thomas Egerton
- 1560 - 1571 Sir Thomas Stanley
- 1571 - 1582 John Lonyson
- 1582 - 1599 Sir Richard Martin
- 1599 - 1609 Sir Richard Martin (died 1616) and Richard Martin
- 1617 - 1623 Sir Edward Villiers
- 1623 - 1626 Sir Randal Cranfield
- 1626 - 1635 Sir Robert Harley
- 1635 - 1643 In Commission:
  - Sir Ralph Freeman
  - Sir Thomas Aylesbury
- 1643 - 1649 Sir Robert Harley
- 1649 - 1653 Aaron Guerdon
- 1660 - 1662 Sir Ralph Freeman
- 1662 - 1667 In Commission
  - Sir Ralph Freeman
  - Henry Slingsby
- 1667 - 1680 Henry Slingsby (suspended 1680)
- 1680 - 1684 In Commission:
  - Sir John Buckworth
  - Charles Duncombe
  - James Hoare
- 1684 - 1686 In Commission:
  - Thomas Neale
  - Charles Duncombe
  - James Hoare
- 1686 - 1699 Thomas Neale
- 1699 - 1727 Sir Isaac Newton
- 1727 - 1737 John Conduitt
- 1737 - 1745 Richard Arundell
- 1745 - 1769 William Chetwynd (Note: Succeeded as 3rd Viscount Chetwynd in 1767.)
- 1769 - 1784 Charles Cadogan (Note: Succeeded as 3rd Baron Cadogan in 1776.)
- 1784 - 1789 Thomas Howard, 3rd Earl of Effingham
- 1789 - 1790 Philip Stanhope, 5th Earl of Chesterfield
- 1790 - 1794 George Townshend, Earl of Leicester
- 1794 - 1799 Sir George Yonge, 5th Baronet
- 1799 - 1801 Robert Jenkinson, Baron Hawkesbury
- 1801 - 1802 Charles Perceval, 2nd Baron Arden
- 1802 - 1804 John Smyth
- 1804 - 1806 Henry Bathurst, 3rd Earl Bathurst
- 1806 - 1806 Lord Charles Spencer
- 1806 - 1807 Charles Bathurst
- 1807 - 1812 Henry Bathurst, 3rd Earl Bathurst
- 1812 - 1814 Richard Trench, 2nd Earl of Clancarty
- 1814 - 1823 William Wellesley-Pole
- 1823 - 1827 Thomas Wallace
- 1827 - 1828 George Tierney
- 1828 - 1830 John Charles Herries
- 1830 - 1834 George Eden, 2nd Baron Auckland
- 1834 - 1835 James Abercrombie
- 1835 - 1835 Alexander Baring
- 1835 - 1841 Henry Labouchere
- 1841 - 1845 William Ewart Gladstone
- 1845 - 1846 Sir George Clerk, 6th Baronet
- 1846 - 1850 Richard Lalor Sheil
- 1850 - 1855 Sir John Herschel
- 1855 - 1869 Thomas Graham
- 1870 - Office amalgamated into the office of Chancellor of the Exchequer

== Deputy Master of the Mint ==
Now a private company; the job of Deputy Master is held by the Royal Mint's Chief Executive.

- 1868 - 1894 Charles William Fremantle
- 1894 - 1902 Sir Horace Seymour
- 1903 - 1913 William Ellison-Macartney
- 1913 - 1917 Sir Thomas Elliott, 1st Baronet
- 1917 - 1922 Sir John Westerman Cawston
- 1922 - 1938 Sir Robert A. Johnson
- 1938 - 1949 Sir John Craig
- 1950 - 1957 Sir Lionel Thompson
- 1957 - 1970 Sir John ("Jack") Hastings James
- 1970 - 1974 Harold Glover
- 1974 - 1977 John R. Christie
- 1978 - 1987 Dr Jeremy Gerhard
- 1989 - 1992 Anthony D Garrett
- 1993 - 2001 Roger Holmes
- 2001 - 2006 Gerald Sheehan
- 2007 - 2010 Andrew Stafford
- 2010 - 2018 Adam Lawrence
- 2018 - present Anne Jessopp

== See also ==
- Münzmeister
- Warden of the Mint
- Zarabi
