= Thomas Stanley (Royal Mint) =

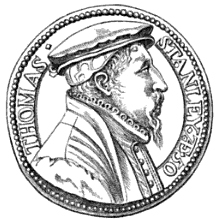
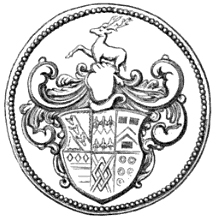
Portrait medal of Thomas Stanley (obverse and reverse) by Steven van Herwijck, 1562.

Thomas Stanley (died 15 December 1571) was a goldsmith and officer of the Royal Mint in Tudor England. Stanley rose to the rank of Under-Treasurer of the Mint at the Tower of London in the reign of Queen Elizabeth I.

== Family ==
Thomas Stanley was the third son of Thomas Stanley, of Dalgarth, Cumberland, and his wife Margaret, daughter of John Fleming. He married Joyce, daughter of John Barrett, of Aveley, Essex, and widow of Sir James Wilford, soldier and politician. Their only daughter, Mary, married Sir Edward Herbert (c. 1542–1595), second son of the Earl of Pembroke. Her son William Herbert, 1st Baron Powis (1572–1655) was Lord High Steward to Elizabeth I and is a candidate for "Mr WH", the dedicatee of Shakespeare's sonnets.

== Career ==
Stanley was appointed as one of the Assay Masters of the Mint in March 1545, following a restructuring and expansion of the Royal Mint under Henry VIII associated with a major effort to prop up the economy by debasing the currency. The policy of debasement was continued by Lord Protector Somerset early in the reign of Henry's son, Edward VI, but after Somerset's fall the Earl of Warwick implemented a plan to reform the currency in an attempt to control rampant inflation. Stanley was one of a consortium of Mint officials appointed in 1551 to advise the government on new standards for the coinage. Another general restructuring of the Mint in the spring of 1552 resulted in the appointment of Thomas Egerton as Under-Treasurer and Stanley's promotion to Comptroller.

Egerton was dismissed from office by Mary I's government in 1555, and from that time until 1571 control of the Tower Mint was essentially in the hands of Thomas Stanley. On the accession of Elizabeth he was confirmed as Comptroller of the Mint (August 1559) and he was formally appointed Under-Treasurer of the Mint on 14 July 1561, an office he held until his death. As head officer of the Tower Mint, Stanley supervised the great Elizabethan recoinage which was planned from the beginning of the reign and was carried out between December 1560 and October 1561.

Disputes between Stanley and his fellow officers, Comptroller John Bull and assay-master William Humfrey, broke out in a series of accusations and cross-accusations over the next few years that escalated to a 1565 attempt by the two men to discredit Stanley by stealing money under his control. The plot was discovered and Bull confessed, but questions about Stanley's management of the Mint continued. His inability to properly account for his funds during the reign of Queen Mary led to the confiscation of his properties on 2 October 1571, and he died two months later, on 15 December 1571.
