= St Vedast Foster Lane =

Coordinates: 51°30′53.56″N 0°5′46.08″W

St. Vedast Foster Lane
- Parish Church of Saint Vedast Foster Lane
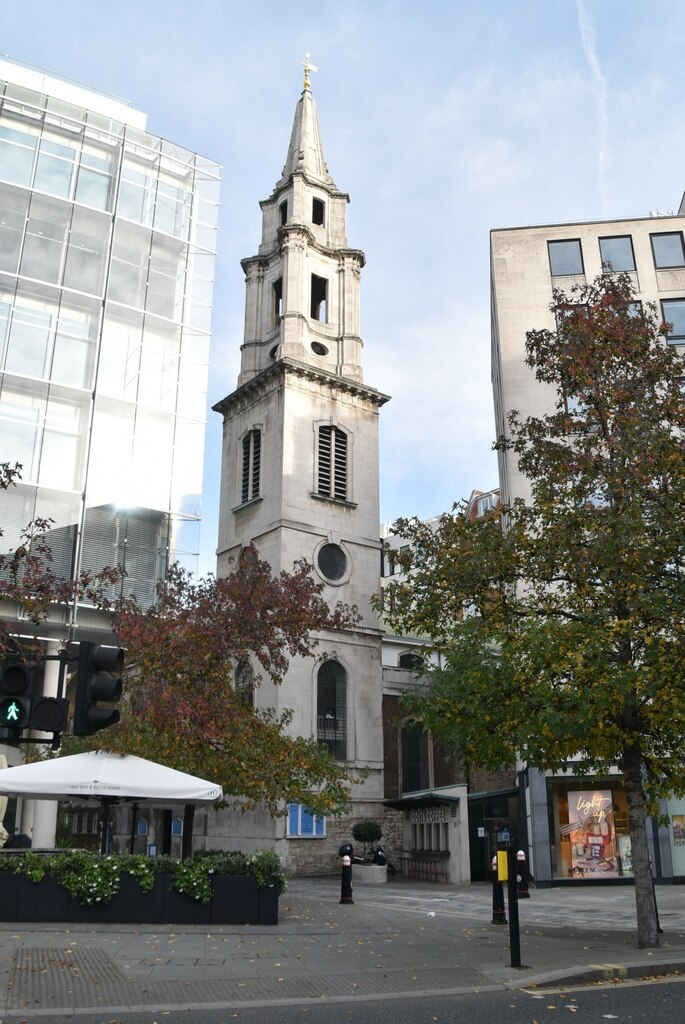
- Photo of St. Vedast Foster Lane

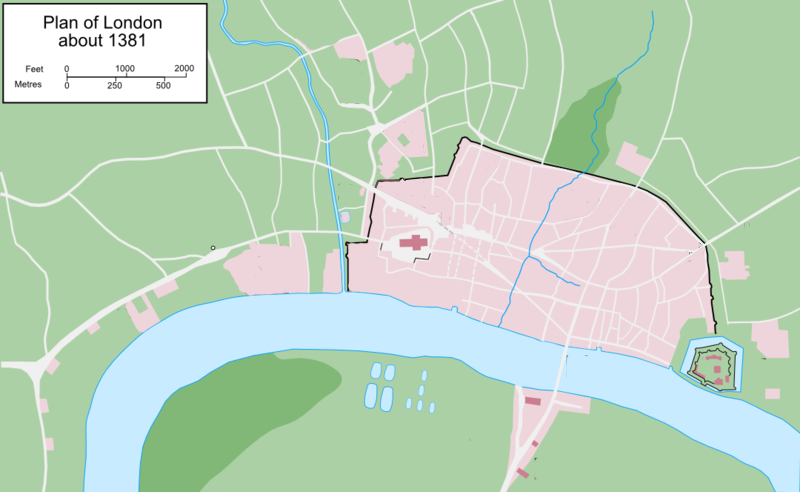
- Location within City of London Location within City of London in 1300
- OS grid reference: TQ 32202 81272
- Location: 4 Foster Lane, City of London, EC2
- Country: England
- Language: English
- Denomination: Church of England
- Previous denomination: Roman Catholic (to 1538)
- Website: vedast.org.uk

History
- Founded: Before 1308
- Dedication: Saint Vedast (Foster)

Architecture
- Heritage designation: Grade I listed building
- Architect: Sir Christopher Wren
- Style: English Baroque

Administration
- Diocese: London

Clergy
- Rector: The Revd Paul Kennedy

Saint Vedast Foster Lane or Saint Vedast-alias-Foster, a church in Foster Lane, in the City of London, is dedicated to St. Vedast (Foster is an Anglicisation of the name "Vaast", as the saint is known in continental Europe), a French saint whose cult arrived in England through contacts with Augustinian clergy.

== History ==
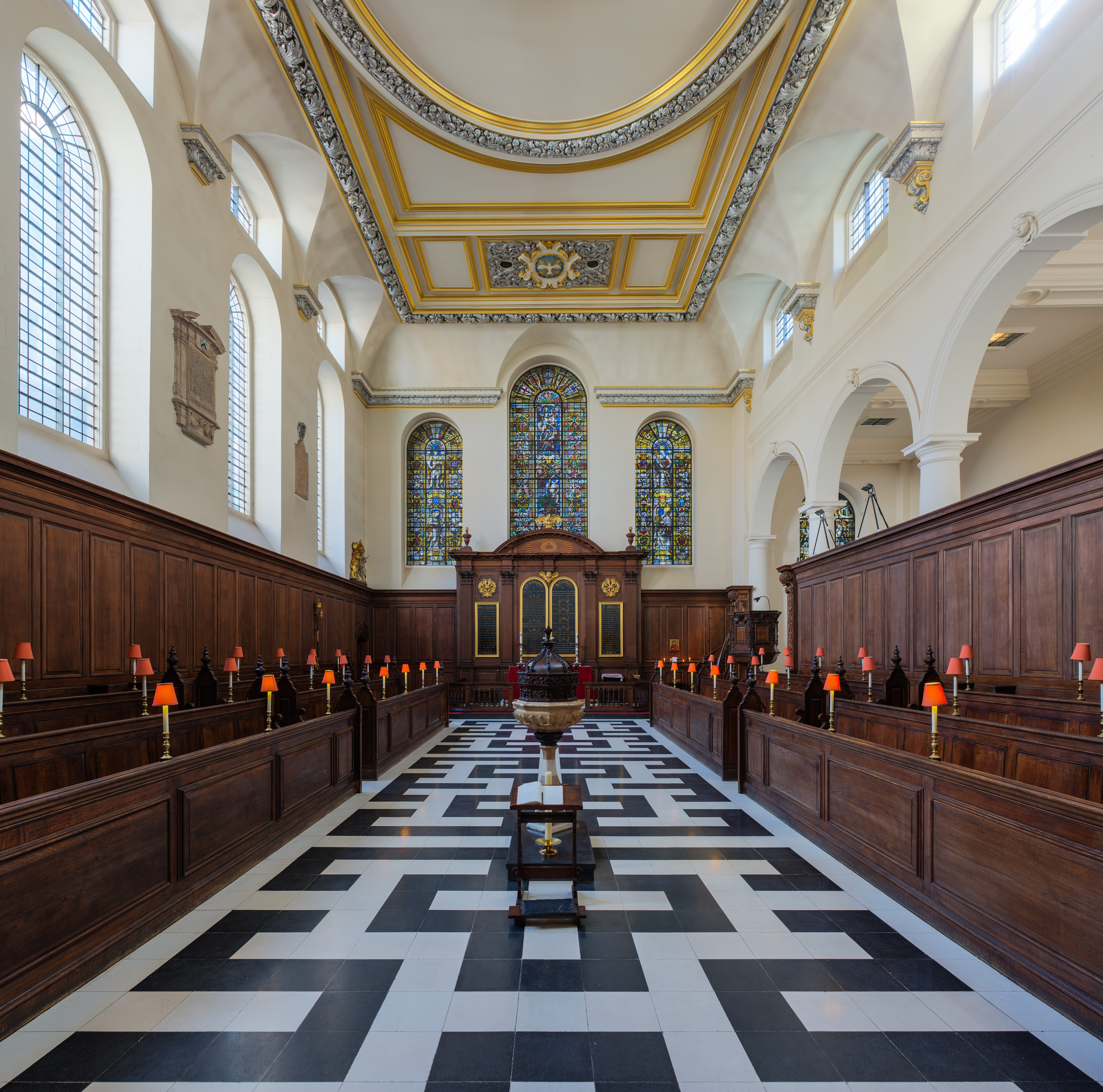
The altar

The original church of St Vedast (d. c. AD 540) was founded before 1308 and was extensively repaired by 1662 on parochial initiative. The poet Robert Herrick was baptised here in 1591.

Although the church was not completely destroyed in the Great Fire of 1666, it was so badly damaged that it was included in the list of 50 or so churches that required reconstruction by the office of Sir Christopher Wren. The main part of the church was rebuilt 1670–1673 on the old walls at a cost of £1,853, 15s and 6d, the cheapest of all Wren's City commissions. Some parts of the medieval fabric were incorporated, most noticeably the south wall which was revealed by restoration in 1992–93.

The tower, on the other hand, survived in its original state until 1694 when it was pulled down, and a new one erected (possibly on its mediaeval lower stages) in 1695–98. The three-tier spire, considered one of the most baroque of all the City spires, was added in 1709–12 at a cost of £2,958, possibly to the designs of Nicholas Hawksmoor, whose correspondence with the churchwardens also survives, but whose drawings do not. With this late completion date, it was possibly the last of Wren's city churches to be finished. The tower was built by Edward Strong the Younger, a friend of Christopher Wren the Younger.

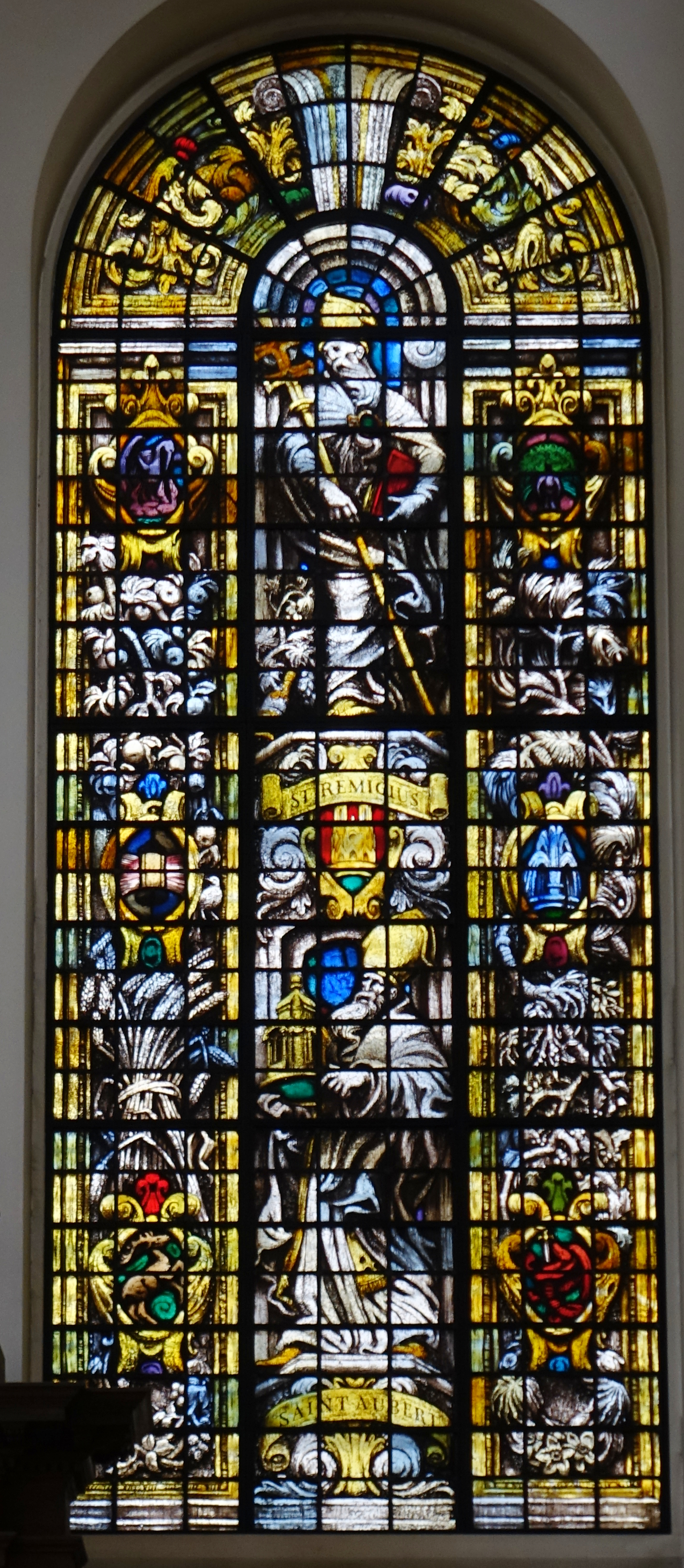
Stained glass by Brian Thomas OBE

Wren's church was gutted a second time by firebombs during the London blitz of 1940 and 1941. A proposal by Sir Hugh Casson to leave this and several other churches as roofless ruins to serve as a war memorial was not implemented. The post-war restoration within the old walls and re-roofing was undertaken by Stephen Dykes Bower from 1953 under the new rector, Canon Charles B. Mortlock. The Parochial Church Council at the time included Sir John Betjeman and the organ builder Noel Mander.

Dykes Bower re-ordered the interior in a collegiate chapel style with seating down each side with a side chapel in the former South aisle, and squared the old walls which were not rectangular in plan so that the altar now faces the nave squarely. He made an almost imperceptible taper in the pews and floor pattern, to give a false perspective towards the altar, making the church look longer than it is. Dykes Bower designed the fine plaster ceiling, in the style of the late seventeenth century, which is embellished with gold and varnished aluminium leaf. Fittings from other destroyed City churches, including the richly carved pulpit from All Hallows Bread Street and the font and cover from St Anne and St Agnes were incorporated into the new design. Dykes Bower commissioned the Whitefriars glass windows in the East End, showing scenes from the life of St Vedast. These windows use opaque glass to hide tall buildings behind and to disguise the fact that the East wall is a wedge in plan. The work was completed in 1962. An aumbry above the south chapel altar is by Bernard Merry.

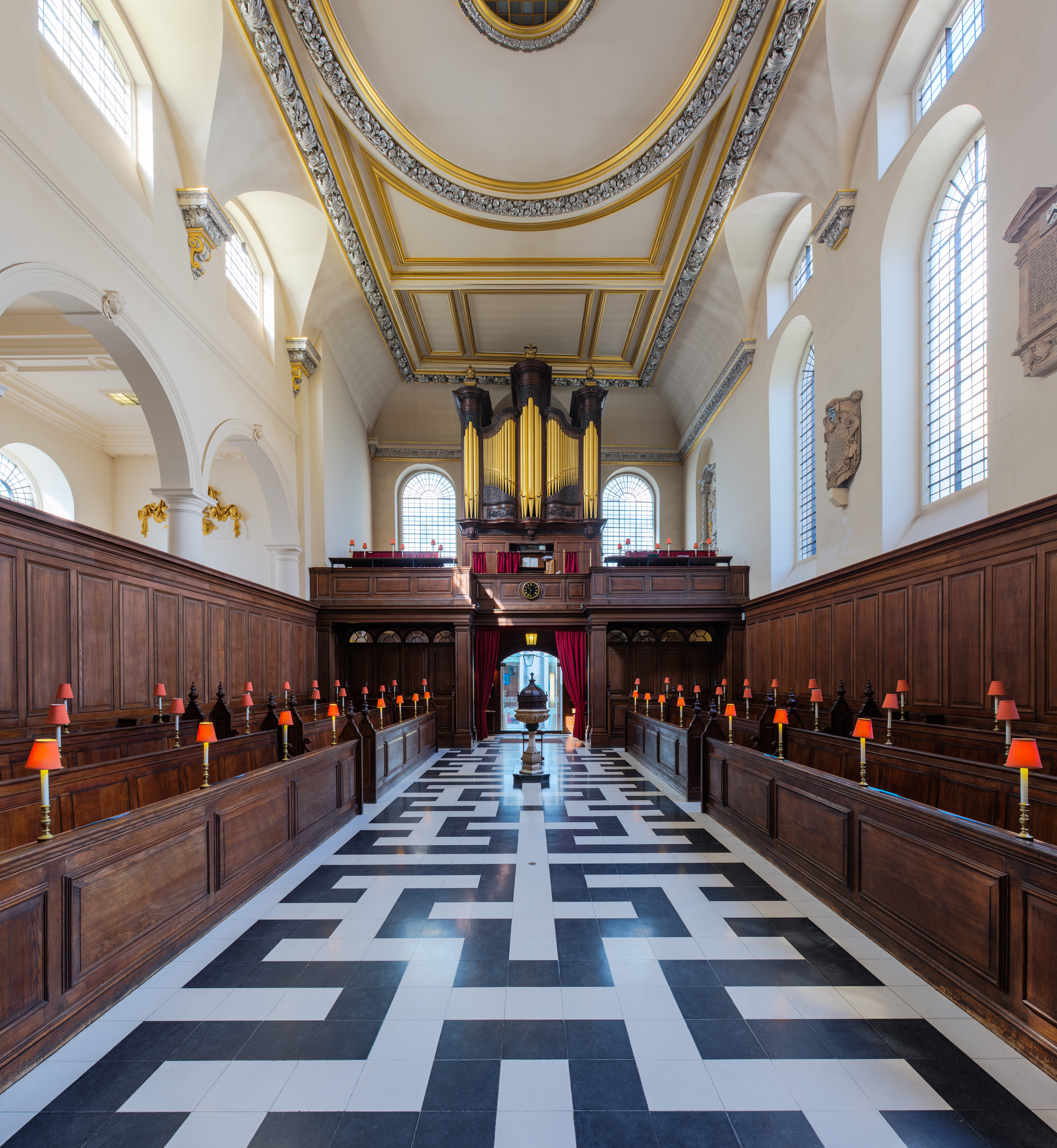
The organ

Dykes Bower also built a small Parish Room to the North East of the church in 17th-century style and a Georgian-style rectory, adjacent to the church, on Foster Lane in 1959 – in the first floor room of which is an important mural by Hans Feibusch on the subject of Jacob and the Angel. A niche in the internal courtyard of the rectory contains a carved stone head of Canon Mortlock by sculptor Jacob Epstein. Mortlock gave the eulogy at Epstein's funeral in 1959.

The church is noted for its small but lively baroque steeple, its small secluded courtyard, stained glass, and a richly decorated ceiling. It also has a ring of six bells, cast by Mears and Stainbank in 1960. They were recast from the mixed peal (of which the earliest dated back to 1671) which were all cracked in the bombing of 1941.

== Organ ==
The current organ was originally built by John Harris (the son of Renatus Harris) & John Byfield in 1731 for St Bartholomew-by-the-Exchange. That church was demolished in 1840, and its newly built replacement, St. Bartholomew, Moor Lane housed the organ from 1841. The church was in turn demolished in 1902; the organ found its way to St. Alban-the-Martyr, Fulham, (built 1894–6) in 1904; and lastly to St. Vedast in 1959. It was restored and enlarged in 1962 by Noel Mander, re-using the Harris case. It has one of the oldest soundboards still in use in the country.

The previous organ was by J.W. Walker, installed at the West end of the church in 1853. It was enlarged by J. W. Walker & Sons Ltd and moved to the East end in 1885. It was destroyed during the incendiary bombing on 10 May 1941. It replaced one built by Crang & Hancock in 1774.

== Listed building status ==
The church was designated a Grade I listed building on 4 January 1950. The rectory was listed as a Grade II building on 15 July 1998.

== See also ==
- List of churches and cathedrals of London
- List of Christopher Wren churches in London
