= Special Relationship =

Relationship between the UK and the US

The Special Relationship
- British prime minister Margaret Thatcher and US president Ronald Reagan in 1985. Their strong bond epitomised UK–US relations in the late 20th century.
- Origin: Iron Curtain Speech (1946)
- Coined by: Winston Churchill

The term Special Relationship first came into popular usage following a 1946 speech by former UK prime minister Winston Churchill, to describe relations between the United Kingdom (UK) and the United States (US). Among major world powers, the military co-operation, intelligence sharing, and trade between the UK and US has been described as "unparalleled". Both have been close allies in global conflicts including World War I, World War II, the Cold War, and the war on terror.

The personal close relationships between UK and US heads of government, including that between Margaret Thatcher and Ronald Reagan and later between Tony Blair and both Bill Clinton and George W. Bush have been cited as popular evidence of the special relationship. At the diplomatic level, characteristics include recurring public representations of the relationship as "special", frequent and high-profile political visits and extensive information exchange at the diplomatic working level.

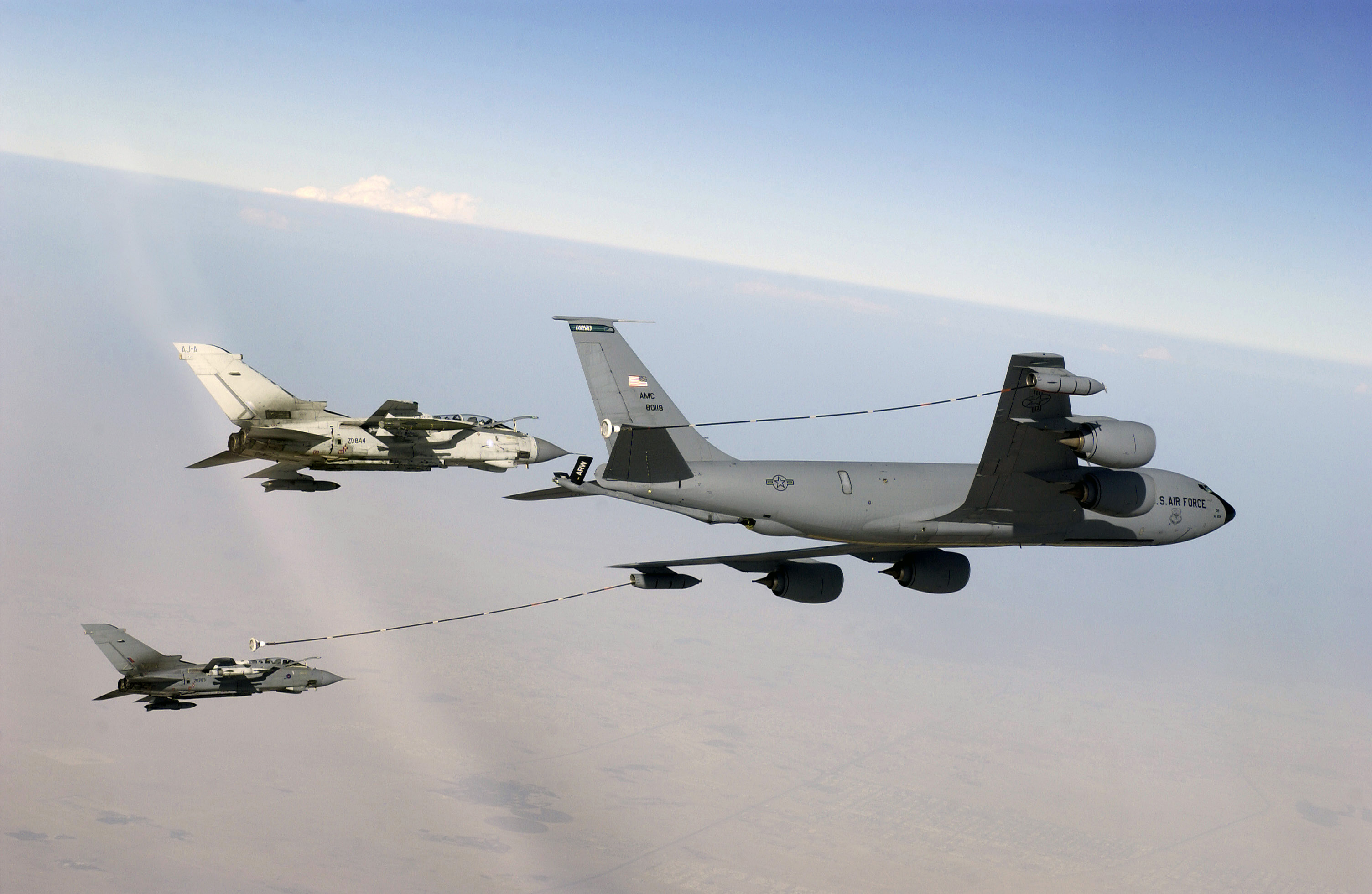
A pair of Royal Air Force GR4 Tornados move up to a US Air Force KC-135 Stratotanker to refuel somewhere over Iraq in 2003, as part of Operation Iraqi Freedom — the invasion of Iraq by the US, UK and other allies

Some deny the existence of a "special relationship" and call it a myth. During the 1956 Suez Crisis, US president Dwight Eisenhower threatened to bankrupt the pound sterling due to Britain's invasion of Egypt. Thatcher privately opposed the 1983 US invasion of Grenada, and Reagan unsuccessfully initially pressured against the 1982 Falklands War and refused to offer US military support to the UK. Former US president Barack Obama described German chancellor Angela Merkel as his "closest international partner", while incumbent US president Donald Trump described the relationship in 2026 as "not what it was [before]", following the UK's initial response to US strikes on Iran. Others have argued that the UK is either now or becoming a vassal or client state of the US, sometimes being referred to as the 51st state of the US.

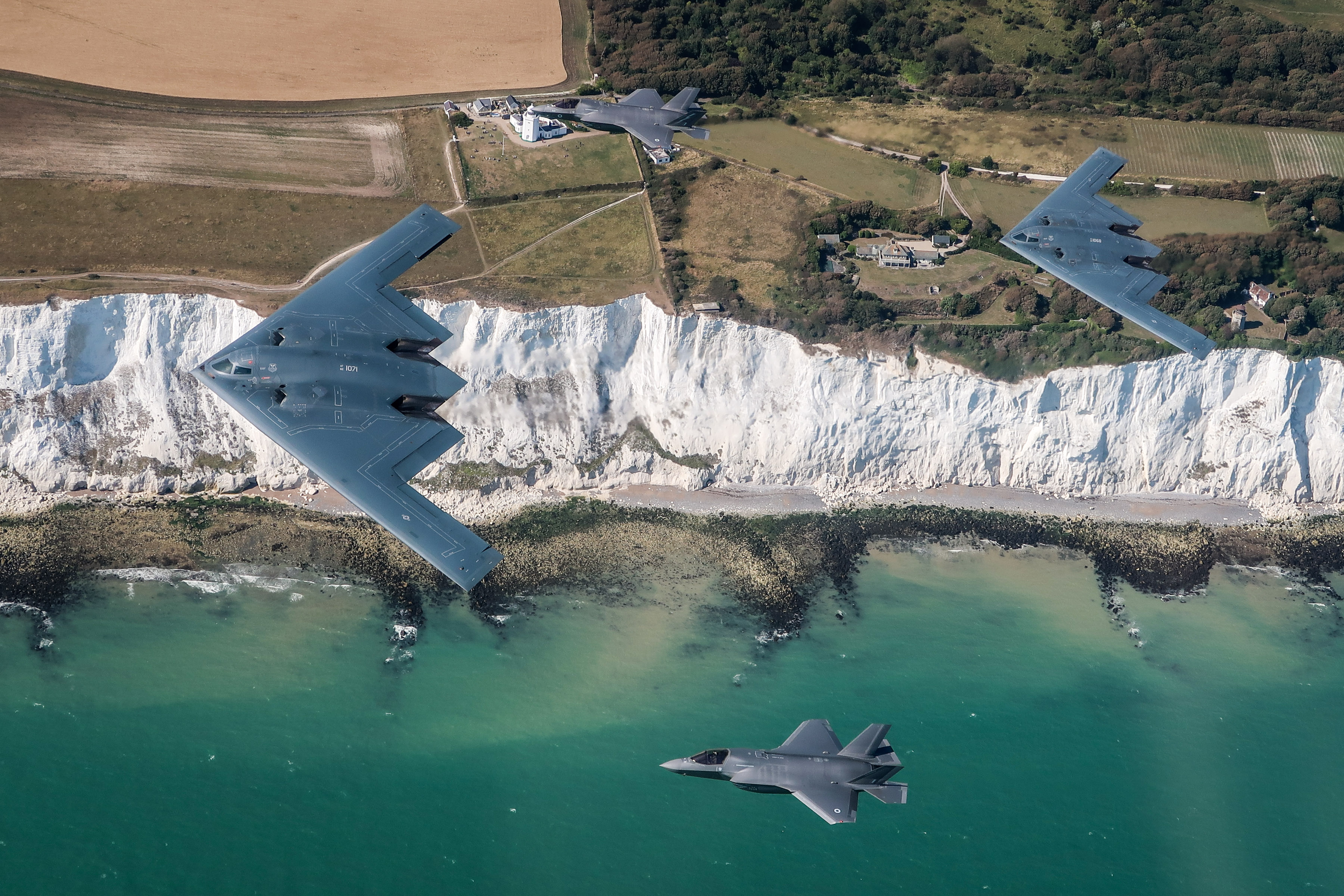
US Air Force B-2 Spirit stealth bombers, based at RAF Fairford in Gloucestershire, England, conducting joint training with Royal Air Force F-35s over the English town of Dover on the south coast of the UK in 2019

== Origins ==
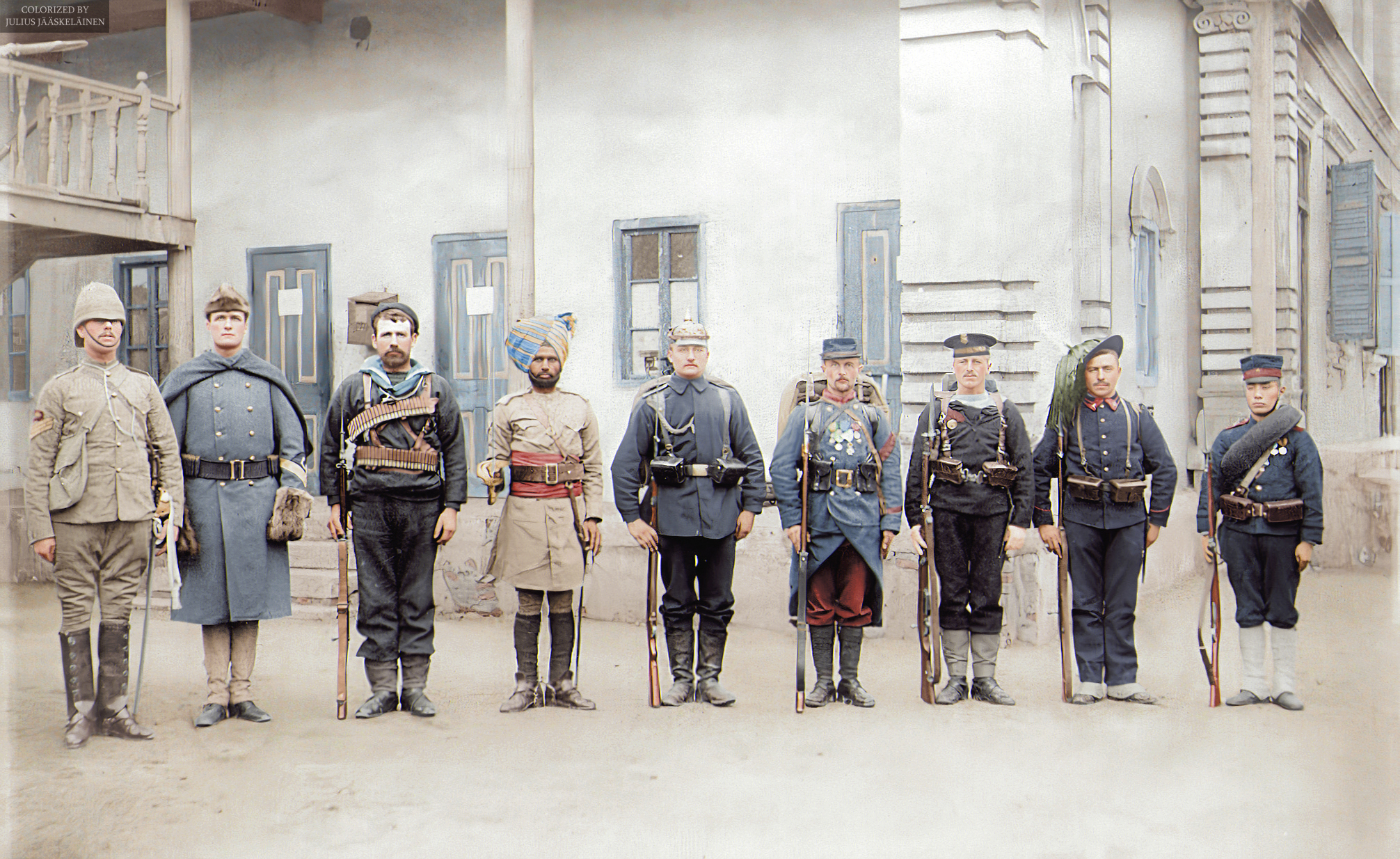
A British soldier and an American soldier standing far left with other representatives of the 1900, Eight-Nation Alliance, of which the United Kingdom and United States played a leading role

Although the "Special Relationship" between the UK and the US was perhaps most memorably emphasized by Churchill, its existence and even the term itself had been recognized since the 19th century, not least by rival powers.

The American and British governments were enemies when foreign relations between them first began, after the Second Continental Congress, convening in Philadelphia and representing all Thirteen Colonies, unanimously declared their independence from British rule, which formalized the American Revolutionary War, which commenced the year before at the Battles of Lexington and Concord. Relations often continued to be strained until the mid-19th century, erupting into open conflict during the War of 1812 and again verging on war when Britain almost supported the separatist Confederate States during the beginning of the American Civil War. British leaders were constantly annoyed from the 1830s to the 1860s by what they saw as American pandering to the mob, as in the Aroostook War in 1838–1839 and the Oregon boundary dispute in 1844–1846. However, British middle-class public opinion sensed a common "special relationship" between the two peoples based on their shared language, migrations, evangelical Protestantism, classical liberalism and extensive private trade. That constituency rejected war, which forced Britain to appease America. During the Trent Affair of late 1861, London drew the line, and Washington retreated.

Troops from both nations had begun fighting side by side, sometimes spontaneously in skirmishes overseas by 1859, and both liberal democracies shared a common bond of sacrifice during the First World War (though the US was never formally a member of the Allies but entered the war in 1917 as a self-styled "Associated Power"). British prime minister Ramsay MacDonald's visit to the US in 1930 confirmed his own belief in the "special relationship" and so he looked to the Washington Naval Treaty, rather than a revival of the Anglo-Japanese alliance, as the guarantee of peace in the Far East.

However, as the historian David Reynolds observed, "For most of the period since 1919, Anglo-American relations had been cool and often suspicious. United States 'betrayal' of the League of Nations was only the first in a series of US actions—over war debts, naval rivalry, the 1931–2 Manchurian crisis and the Depression—that convinced British leaders that the United States could not be relied on". Equally, as US president Harry S. Truman's Secretary of State, Dean Acheson, recalled, "Of course a unique relation existed between Britain and America—our common language and history ensured that. But unique did not mean affectionate. We had fought England as an enemy as often as we had fought by her side as an ally".

== Churchillian emphasis ==
External videos
- Booknotes interview with Jon Meacham on Franklin and Winston: An Intimate Portrait of an Epic Friendship, 15 February 2004, C-SPAN

The outbreak of World War II provoked the rapid emergence of an unambiguously positive relationship between the two nations. The Fall of France in 1940 has been described as a decisive event in international relations, which led the Special Relationship to displace the Entente Cordiale as the pivot of the international system. During the war, one observer noted, "Great Britain and the United States integrated their military efforts to a degree unprecedented among major allies in the history of warfare". "Each time I must choose between you and Roosevelt", Churchill shouted at General Charles de Gaulle, the leader of the Free French, in 1945, "I shall choose Roosevelt". Between 1939 and 1945, Churchill and Roosevelt exchanged 1,700 letters and telegrams and met 11 times. Churchill estimated that they had 120 days of close personal contact. On one occasion, Roosevelt went to Churchill's room when Churchill had just emerged from the bath. On his return from Washington, Churchill said to King George VI, "Sir, I believe I am the only man in the world to have received the head of a nation naked". Roosevelt found the encounter amusing and remarked to his private secretary, Grace Tully, "You know, he's pink and white all over".

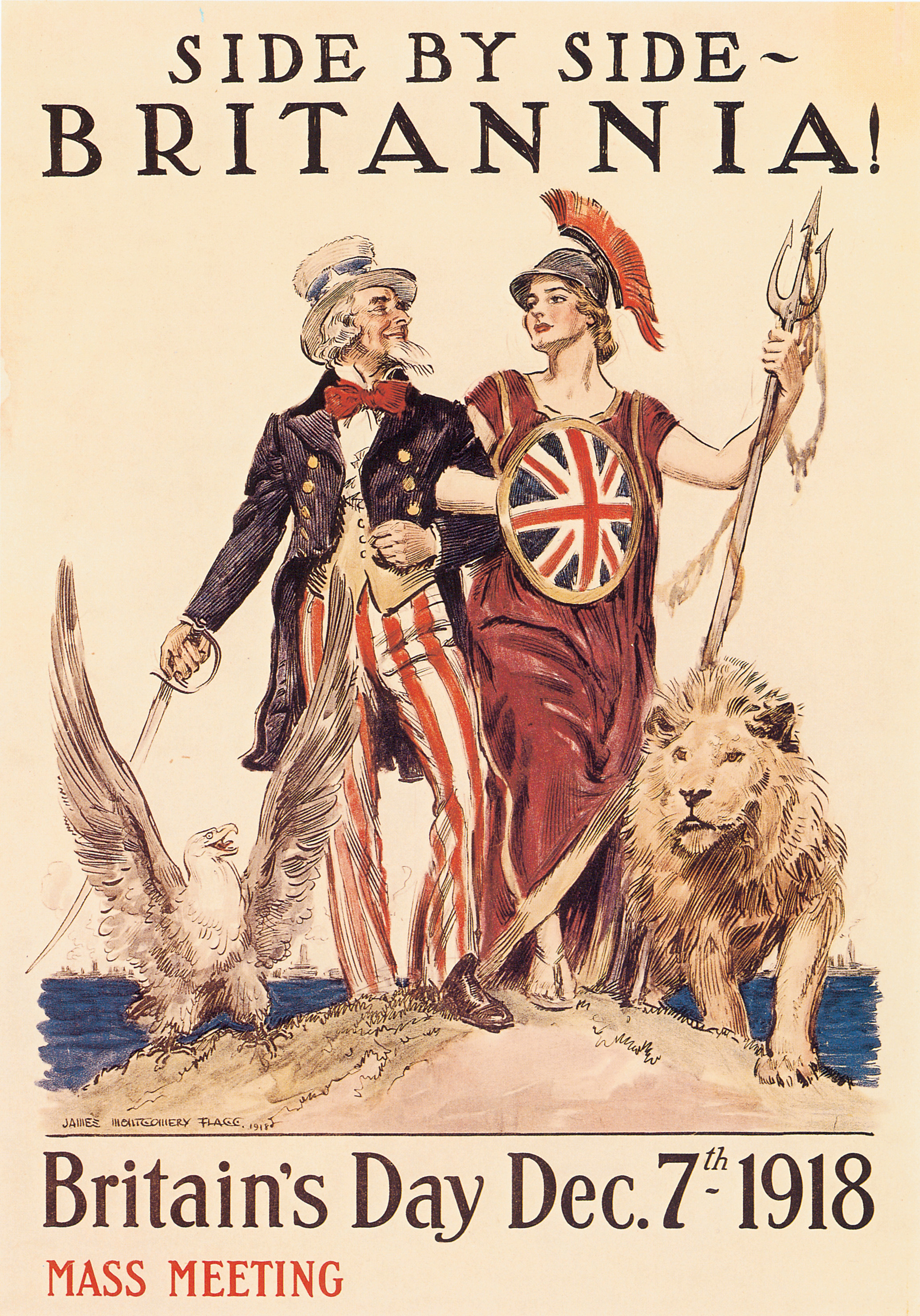
A poster from shortly after World War I showing Britannia arm-in-arm with Uncle Sam, symbolizing the Anglo–American alliance

Churchill's mother was a US citizen, and he keenly felt the links between the two English-speaking peoples. He first used the term "special relationship" on 16 February 1944, when he said it was his "deepest conviction that unless Britain and the United States are joined in a special relationship... another destructive war will come to pass". He used it again in 1945 to describe not the Anglo–American relationship alone but Britain's relationship with both the Americans and the Canadians. The New York Times Herald quoted Churchill in November 1945:

We should not abandon our special relationship with the United States and Canada about the atomic bomb and we should aid the United States to guard this weapon as a sacred trust for the maintenance of peace.

Churchill used the phrase again a year later, at the onset of the Cold War, this time to note the special relationship between the US and the English-speaking nations of the British Commonwealth and the Empire. The occasion was his "Sinews of Peace Address", delivered in Fulton, Missouri, on 5 March 1946:

Neither the sure prevention of war, nor the continuous rise of world organization will be gained without what I have called the fraternal association of the English-speaking peoples... a special relationship between the British Commonwealth and Empire and the United States. Fraternal association requires not only the growing friendship and mutual understanding between our two vast but kindred systems of society, but the continuance of the intimate relationship between our military advisers, leading to common study of potential dangers, the similarity of weapons and manuals of instructions, and to the interchange of officers and cadets at technical colleges. It should carry with it the continuance of the present facilities for mutual security by the joint use of all Naval and Air Force bases in the possession of either country all over the world. There is however an important question we must ask ourselves. Would a special relationship between the United States and the British Commonwealth be inconsistent with our over-riding loyalties to the World Organisation? I reply that, on the contrary, it is probably the only means by which that organisation will achieve its full stature and strength.

In the opinion of one international relations specialist, "the United Kingdom's success in obtaining US commitment to cooperation in the postwar world was a major triumph, given the isolation of the interwar period". A senior British diplomat in Moscow, Thomas Brimelow, admitted, "The one quality which most disquiets the Soviet government is the ability which they attribute to us to get others to do our fighting for us... they respect not us, but our ability to collect friends". Conversely, "the success or failure of United States foreign economic peace aims depended almost entirely on its ability to win or extract the co-operation of Great Britain".

Reflecting on the symbiosis, British prime minister Margaret Thatcher in 1982 declared: "The Anglo-American relationship has done more for the defence and future of freedom than any other alliance in the world".

While most government officials on both sides have supported the Special Relationship, there have been sharp critics. The British journalist Guy Arnold (1932–2020) denounced it in 2014 as a "sickness in the body politic of Britain that needs to be flushed out". Instead, he called for closer relationships with Europe and Russia so as to rid "itself of the US incubus".

== Military co-operation ==
The intense level of military co-operation between the UK and the US began with the creation of the Combined Chiefs of Staff in December 1941, a military command with authority over all American and British operations. After the end of the Second World War, the joint command structure was disbanded, but close military cooperation between the nations resumed in the early 1950s with the start of the Cold War. The Tizard Mission catalyzed Allied technological cooperation during World War II.

=== Shared military bases ===
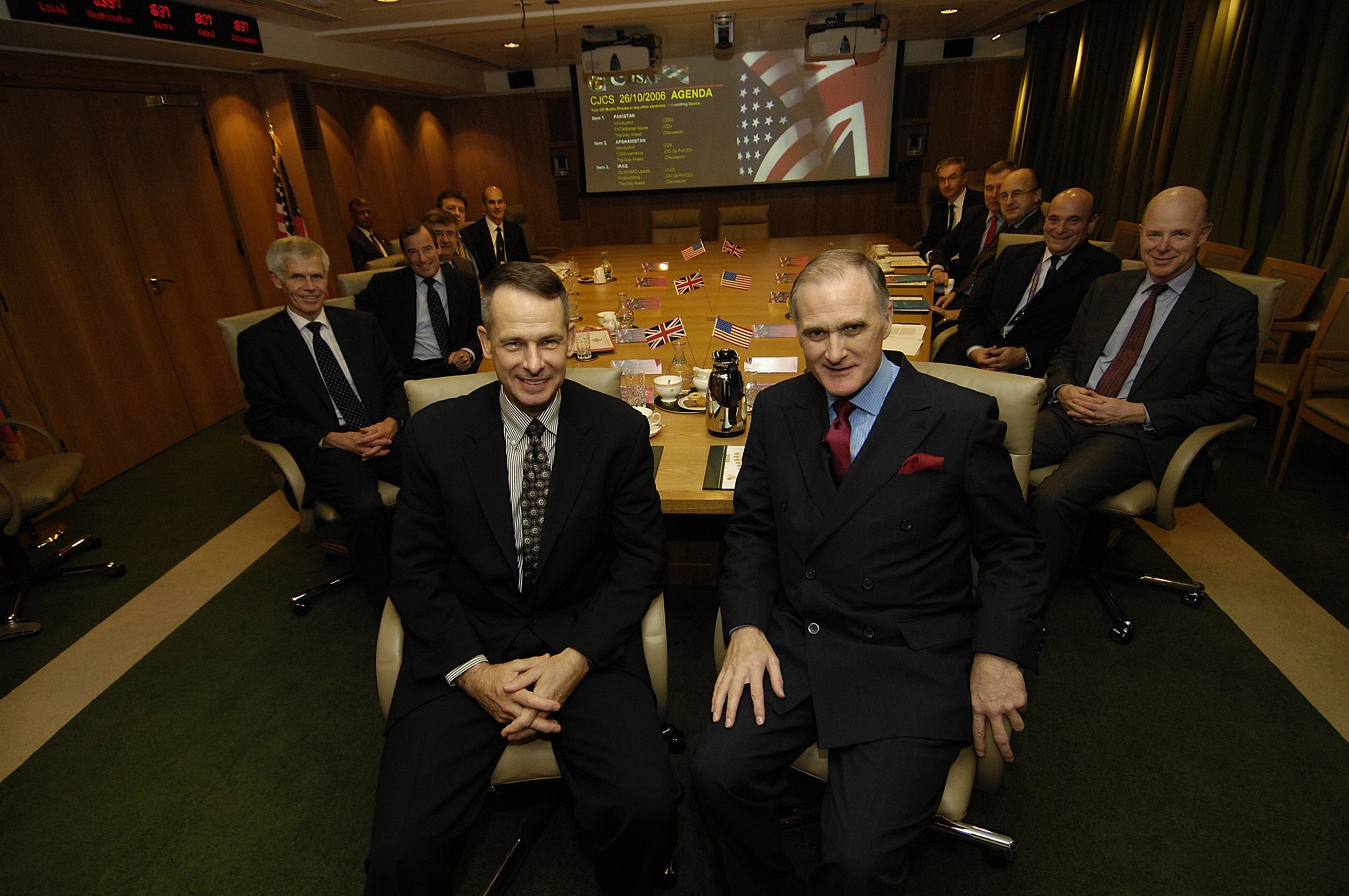
Meeting of the U.S. Chairman of the Joint Chiefs of Staff and the British Chief of the Defence Staff in 2006

Since the Second World War and the subsequent Berlin Blockade, the US has maintained substantial forces in Britain. In July 1948, the first American deployment began with the stationing of B-29 bombers. Currently, an important base is the radar facility RAF Fylingdales, part of the US Ballistic Missile Early Warning System although the base is operated under British command and has only one US Air Force representative, largely for administrative reasons. Several bases with a significant US presence include RAF Menwith Hill (only a short distance from RAF Fylingdales), RAF Lakenheath, RAF Mildenhall (scheduled to close in 2027), RAF Fairford (the only base for US strategic bombers in Europe), RAF Croughton (not an air base but a military communications hub) and RAF Welford (an ammunition storage depot).

Following the end of the Cold War, which was the main rationale for their presence, the number of US facilities in the UK has been reduced in number in line with the US military worldwide. However, the bases have been used extensively in support of various peacekeeping and offensive operations of the 1990s and the early 21st century.

The two nations also jointly operate on the British military facilities of Diego Garcia in the British Indian Ocean Territory and on Ascension Island, a dependency of Saint Helena in the Atlantic Ocean. The US Navy also makes occasional use of British naval bases at Gibraltar and Bermuda, and the US Air Force uses RAF Akrotiri on Cyprus, mainly for reconnaissance flights.

=== Nuclear weapons development ===
The Quebec Agreement of 1943 paved the way for the two countries to develop atomic weapons side by side, the British handing over vital documents from its own Tube Alloys project and sending a delegation to assist in the work of the Manhattan Project. The Americans later kept the results of the work to themselves under the postwar McMahon Act, but after the UK developed its own thermonuclear weapons, the US agreed to supply delivery systems, designs and nuclear material for British warheads through the 1958 US–UK Mutual Defence Agreement.

The UK purchased first the Polaris system and then the US Trident system, which remains in use. The 1958 agreement gave the UK access to the facilities at the Nevada Test Site, and from 1963, it conducted a total of 21 underground tests there before the cessation of testing in 1991. The agreement under which the partnership operates was updated in 2004; anti-nuclear activists argued that the renewal may breach the 1968 Nuclear Non-Proliferation Treaty. The US and the UK jointly conducted subcritical nuclear experiments in 2002 and 2006 to determine the effectiveness of existing stocks, as permitted under the 1998 Comprehensive Nuclear-Test-Ban Treaty.

=== Military procurement ===
The Reagan administration offered Britain the opportunity to purchase the F-117 Nighthawk stealth aircraft while it was a black program. The UK is the only collaborative, or Level One, international partner in the largest US aircraft procurement project in history, the F-35 Lightning II program. The UK was involved in writing the specification and selection and its largest defense contractor, BAE Systems, is a partner of the American prime contractor Lockheed Martin. BAE Systems is also the largest foreign supplier to the US Defense Department and has been permitted to buy important US defense companies like Lockheed Martin Aerospace Electronic Systems and United Defense.

The US operates several British designs including Chobham Armour, the Harrier GR9/AV-8B Harrier II and the US Navy T-45 Goshawk. The UK also operates several American designs, including the Javelin anti-tank missile, M270 rocket artillery, the Apache gunship, C-17 Globemaster transport aircraft and various military variants of Boeing commercial airliners.

== Other areas of co-operation ==
=== Intelligence sharing ===
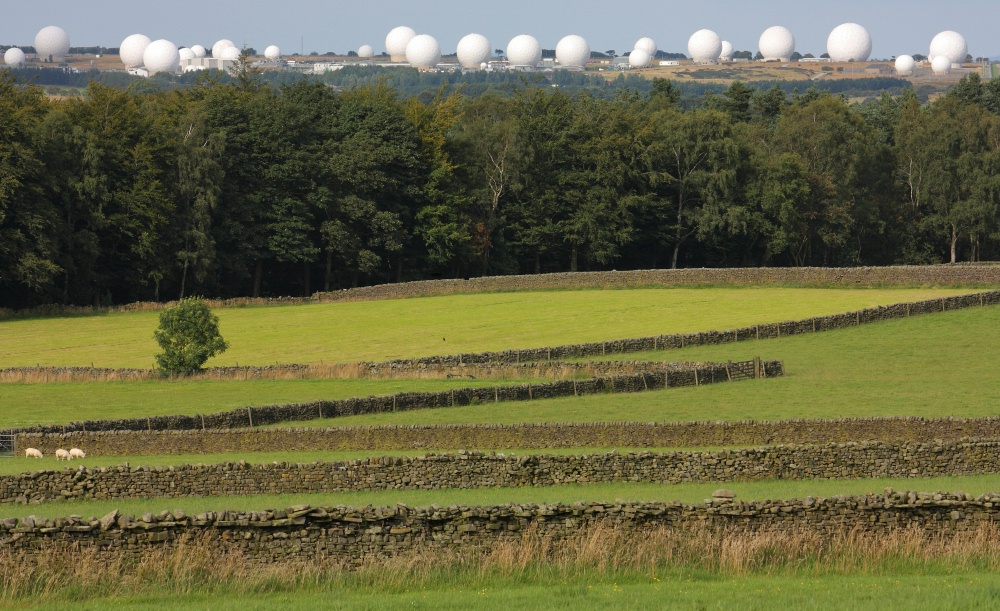
RAF Menwith Hill, near Harrogate, England, provides communications and intelligence support services to both the UK and the US.

A cornerstone of the Special Relationship is the collecting and sharing of intelligence, which originated during the Second World War with the sharing of code-breaking knowledge and led to the 1943 BRUSA Agreement, which was signed at Bletchley Park. After the war, the common goal of monitoring and countering the threat of communism prompted the UK-USA Security Agreement of 1948. This agreement brought together the SIGINT organizations of the US, the UK, Canada, Australia, and New Zealand and is still in place today (Five Eyes). The head of the Central Intelligence Agency station in London attends each weekly meeting of the British Joint Intelligence Committee.

One present-day example of such cooperation is the UKUSA Community, comprising America's National Security Agency, Britain's Government Communications Headquarters, Australia's Defence Signals Directorate and Canada's Communications Security Establishment, which collaborate on ECHELON, a global intelligence gathering system. Under the classified bilateral accords, UKUSA members do not spy on each other.

After the discovery of the 2006 transatlantic aircraft plot, the CIA began to assist the Security Service (MI5) by running its own agent networks in the British Pakistani community. One intelligence official commented on the threat against the US from British Islamists: "The fear is that something like this would not just kill people but cause a historic rift between the US and the UK".

=== Economic policy ===
The US is the largest source of foreign direct investment to the UK, and the UK is likewise the largest single foreign direct investor in the US. British trade and capital have been important components of the American economy since its colonial inception. In trade and finance, the Special Relationship has been described as "well-balanced", with the City of London's regulation in recent years attracting a massive outflow of capital from Wall Street. The key sectors for British exporters to America are aviation, aerospace, commercial property, chemicals and pharmaceuticals and heavy machinery.

British ideas, classical and modern, have also exerted a profound influence on American economic policy, most notably those of the historian Adam Smith on free trade and the economist John Maynard Keynes on countercyclical spending. American and British investors share entrepreneurial attitudes towards the housing market, and the fashion and music industries of both countries are major influences on each other. Trade ties have been strengthened by globalisation, and both governments agree on the need for currency reform in China and for educational reform at home to increase their competitiveness. In 2007, US ambassador Robert H. Tuttle suggested to British business leaders that the Special Relationship could be used "to promote world trade and limit environmental damage as well as combating terrorism".

In a press conference that made several references to the Special Relationship, US secretary of state John Kerry, in London with UK Foreign Secretary William Hague on 9 September 2013, said:

We are not only each other's largest investors in each of our countries, one to the other, but the fact is that every day almost one million people go to work in the United States for British companies that are in the United States, just as more than one million people go to work here in Great Britain for U.S. companies that are here. So we are enormously tied together, obviously. And we are committed to making both the U.S.-UK and the U.S.-EU relationships even stronger drivers of our prosperity.

== History ==
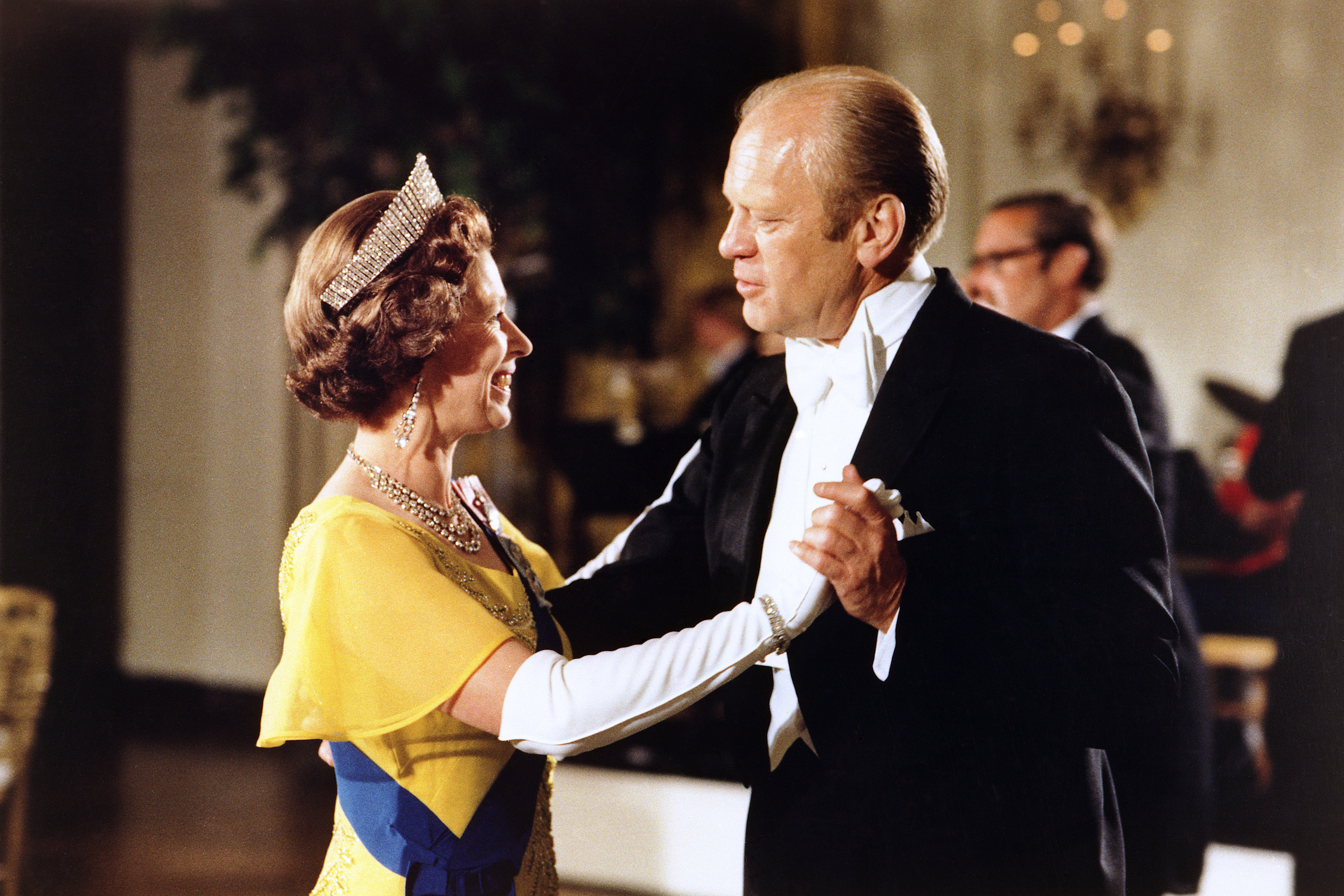
President Gerald Ford dances with Queen Elizabeth II during her 1976 State Visit to the United States

Prior to their collaboration during World War II, Anglo–American relations had been more stand-offish. President Woodrow Wilson and Prime Minister David Lloyd George in Paris had been the first leaders of the two nations to meet face-to-face, but had enjoyed nothing that could be described as a "special relationship", although Lloyd George's wartime Foreign Secretary, Arthur Balfour, got on well with Wilson during his time in the US and helped convince the previously skeptical president to enter World War I. Britain, previously somewhat the predominant partner out of the two countries, had found itself in a more of a secondary role beginning in 1941.

The personal relations between British prime ministers and U.S. presidents have often affected the Special Relationship between the U.S. and the U.K. The first example was the close relationship between Winston Churchill and Franklin Roosevelt, who were in fact distantly related. Churchill spent much time and effort cultivating the relationship, which had a positive impact on the war effort. Two great architects of the Special Relationship on a practical level were Field Marshal Sir John Dill and General George Marshall, whose excellent personal relations and senior positions (Roosevelt was especially close to Marshall) helped to strengthen the alliance. Major links were created during the war, such as the Combined Chiefs of Staff.

The diplomatic policy behind the Special Relationship was two-pronged, encompassing strong personal support between heads of state and equally forthright military and political aid. The most cordial personal relationships between British prime ministers and American presidents have always been those based around shared goals. Peaks in the Special Relationship include the bonds between Harold Macmillan (who like Churchill had an American mother) and John F. Kennedy; between James Callaghan and Jimmy Carter, who were close personal friends despite their differences in personality; between Margaret Thatcher and Ronald Reagan; and more recently between Tony Blair and both Bill Clinton and George W. Bush. Low points in the relationship between the U.S. and the U.K. have occurred due to disagreements over foreign policy, such as Dwight D. Eisenhower's opposition to U.K. operations in Suez under Anthony Eden and Harold Wilson's refusal to enter the war in Vietnam.

=== Timeline ===
U.S. president–U.K. prime minister pairs since Roosevelt–Churchill
British prime minister		United States president		Period of overlapping tenures
Name	Party	Name	Party	Period of overlapping tenures
Winston Churchill	Conservative	Franklin D. Roosevelt	Democratic	May 1940 – April 1945
Winston Churchill	Conservative	Harry S. Truman	Democratic	April 1945 – July 1945
Clement Attlee	Labour	Harry S. Truman	Democratic	July 1945 – October 1951
Winston Churchill	Conservative	Harry S. Truman	Democratic	October 1951 – January 1953
Winston Churchill	Conservative	Dwight D. Eisenhower	Republican	January 1953 – April 1955
Anthony Eden	Conservative	Dwight D. Eisenhower	Republican	April 1955 – January 1957
Harold Macmillan	Conservative	Dwight D. Eisenhower	Republican	January 1957 – January 1961
Harold Macmillan	Conservative	John F. Kennedy	Democratic	January 1961 – October 1963
Alec Douglas-Home	Conservative	John F. Kennedy	Democratic	October 1963– November 1963
Alec Douglas-Home	Conservative	Lyndon B. Johnson	Democratic	November 1963 – October 1964
Harold Wilson	Labour	Lyndon B. Johnson	Democratic	October 1964 – January 1969
Harold Wilson	Labour	Richard Nixon	Republican	January 1969 – June 1970
Edward Heath	Conservative	Richard Nixon	Republican	June 1970 – March 1974
Harold Wilson	Labour	Richard Nixon	Republican	March 1974 – August 1974
Harold Wilson	Labour	Gerald Ford	Republican	August 1974 – April 1976
James Callaghan	Labour	Gerald Ford	Republican	April 1976 – January 1977
James Callaghan	Labour	Jimmy Carter	Democratic	January 1977 – May 1979
Margaret Thatcher	Conservative	Jimmy Carter	Democratic	May 1979 – January 1981
Margaret Thatcher	Conservative	Ronald Reagan	Republican	January 1981 – January 1989
Margaret Thatcher	Conservative	George H. W. Bush	Republican	January 1989 – November 1990
John Major	Conservative	George H. W. Bush	Republican	November 1990 – January 1993
John Major	Conservative	Bill Clinton	Democratic	January 1993 – May 1997
Tony Blair	Labour	Bill Clinton	Democratic	May 1997 – January 2001
Tony Blair	Labour	George W. Bush	Republican	January 2001 – June 2007
Gordon Brown	Labour	George W. Bush	Republican	June 2007 – January 2009
Gordon Brown	Labour	Barack Obama	Democratic	January 2009 – May 2010
David Cameron	Conservative	Barack Obama	Democratic	May 2010 – July 2016
Theresa May	Conservative	Barack Obama	Democratic	July 2016 – January 2017
Theresa May	Conservative	Donald Trump	Republican	January 2017 – July 2019
Boris Johnson	Conservative	Donald Trump	Republican	July 2019 – January 2021
Boris Johnson	Conservative	Joe Biden	Democratic	January 2021 – September 2022
Liz Truss	Conservative	Joe Biden	Democratic	September 2022 – October 2022
Rishi Sunak	Conservative	Joe Biden	Democratic	October 2022 – July 2024
Keir Starmer	Labour	Joe Biden	Democratic	July 2024 – January 2025
Keir Starmer	Labour	Donald Trump	Republican	January 2025 – July 2026
Andy Burnham	Labour	Donald Trump	Republican	July 2026 – present

=== Churchill and Roosevelt (May 1940 – April 1945) ===
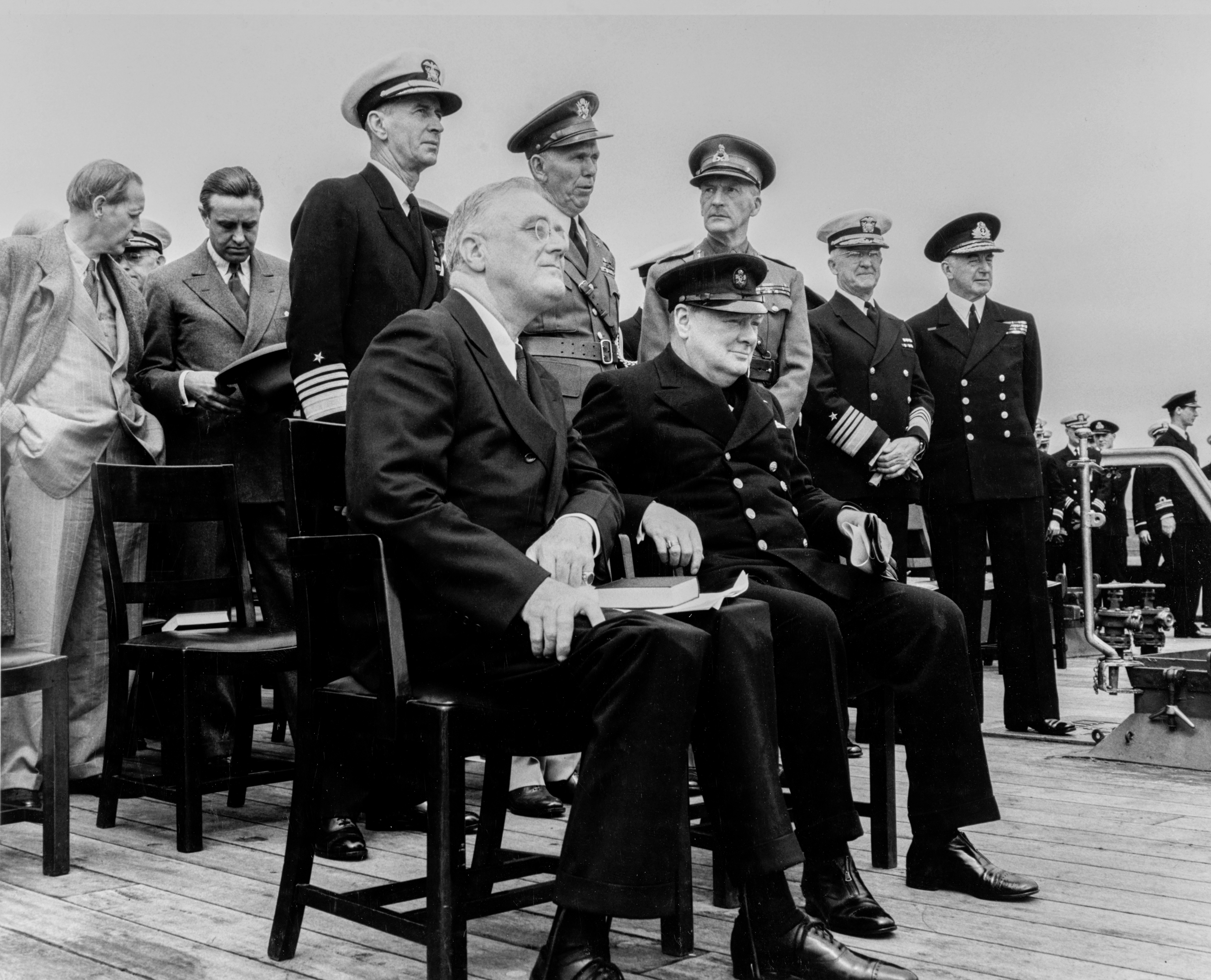
Churchill and Roosevelt aboard HMS Prince of Wales in 1941

When Winston Churchill entered the office of prime minister, the UK had already entered World War II. Immediately at the start of Churchill's premiership, the Battle of Dunkirk took place.

Before Churchill's premiership, President Roosevelt had secretively been in frequent correspondence with him. Their correspondence had begun in September 1939, at the very start of World War II. In these private communications, the two had been discussing ways in which the US might support Britain in their war effort. However, at the time when Winston Churchill assumed the office of prime minister, Roosevelt was nearing the end of his second term and making considerations of seeking election to an unprecedented third term (he would make no public pronouncements about this until the Democratic National Convention that year). From the American experience during the First World War, Roosevelt judged that involvement in the Second World War was likely to be an inevitability. This was a key reason for Roosevelt's decision to break from tradition and seek a third term. Roosevelt desired to be president when the US would finally be drawn into entering the conflict. However, in order to win a third term, Roosevelt made the American people promises that he would keep them out of the war.

In November 1940, upon Roosevelt's victory in the presidential election, Churchill sent him a congratulatory letter,

I prayed for your success…we are entering a somber phase of what must inevitably be a protracted and broadening war.

Having promised the American public to avoid entering any foreign war, Roosevelt went as far as public opinion allowed in providing financial and military aid to Britain, France and China. In a December 1940 talk, dubbed the Arsenal of Democracy Speech, Roosevelt declared, "This is not a fireside chat on war. It is a talk about national security". He went on to declare the importance of American support of Britain's war effort, framing it as a matter of national security for the U.S. As the American public opposed involvement in the conflict, Roosevelt sought to emphasize that it was critical to assist the British in order to prevent the conflict from reaching American shores. He aimed to paint the British war effort as beneficial to the US by arguing that they would contain the Nazi threat from spreading across the Atlantic.

If Great Britain goes down, the Axis powers will be in a position to bring enormous military and naval resources against this hemisphere... We are the Arsenal of Democracy. Our national policy is to keep war away from this country.

— Franklin D. Roosevelt, Fireside chat delivered on December 29, 1940

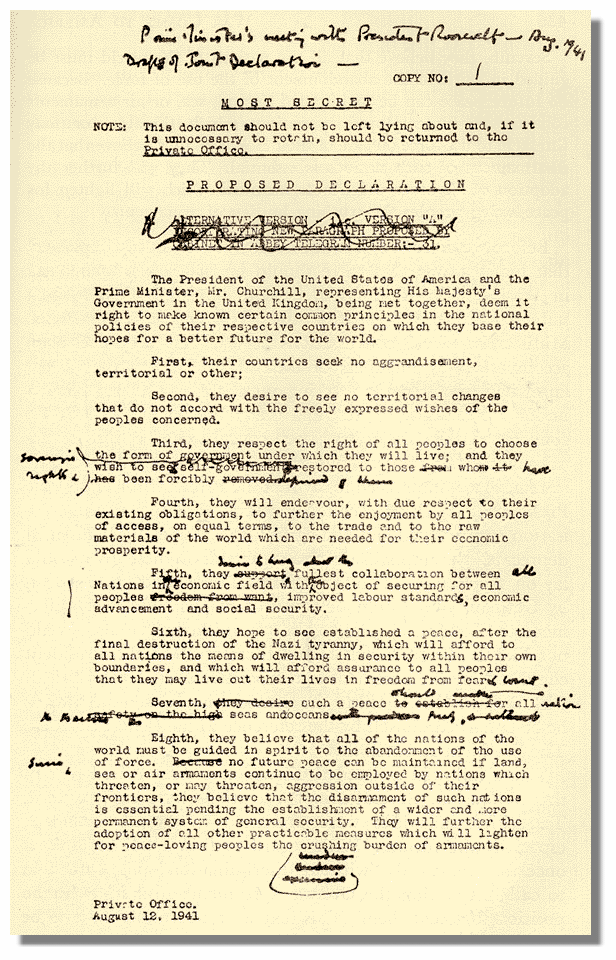
Churchill's edited copy of the final draft of the Atlantic Charter

To assist the British war effort, Roosevelt enacted the Lend-Lease policy and drafted the Atlantic Charter with Churchill. The US ultimately joined the war effort in December 1941, under Roosevelt's leadership.

Roosevelt and Churchill had a relative fondness of one another. They connected on their shared passions for tobacco and liquors, and their mutual interest in history and battleships. Churchill later wrote, "I felt I was in contact with a very great man, who was also a warm-hearted friend, and the foremost champion of the high causes which we served."

One anecdote that has been told to illustrate the intimacy of Churchill and Roosevelt's bond alleges that once, while hosting Churchill at the White House, Roosevelt stopped by the bedroom in which the prime minister was staying to converse with him. Churchill answered his door in a state of nudity, remarking, "You see, Mr. President, I have nothing to hide from you." The president is said to have taken this in good humor, later joking with an aide that Churchill was, "pink and white all over." Between 1939 and 1945, Roosevelt and Churchill exchanged an estimated 1700 letters and telegrams and met with one another 11 times. Replying to Churchill's birthday greeting in January, 1942, Roosevelt, now also in his 60s, wrote him, "It is fun to be in the same decade as you." Beginning under Roosevelt and Churchill, the U.S. and U.K. worked together closely to establish the IMF, World Bank and NATO.

=== Churchill and Truman (April 1945 – July 1945) ===
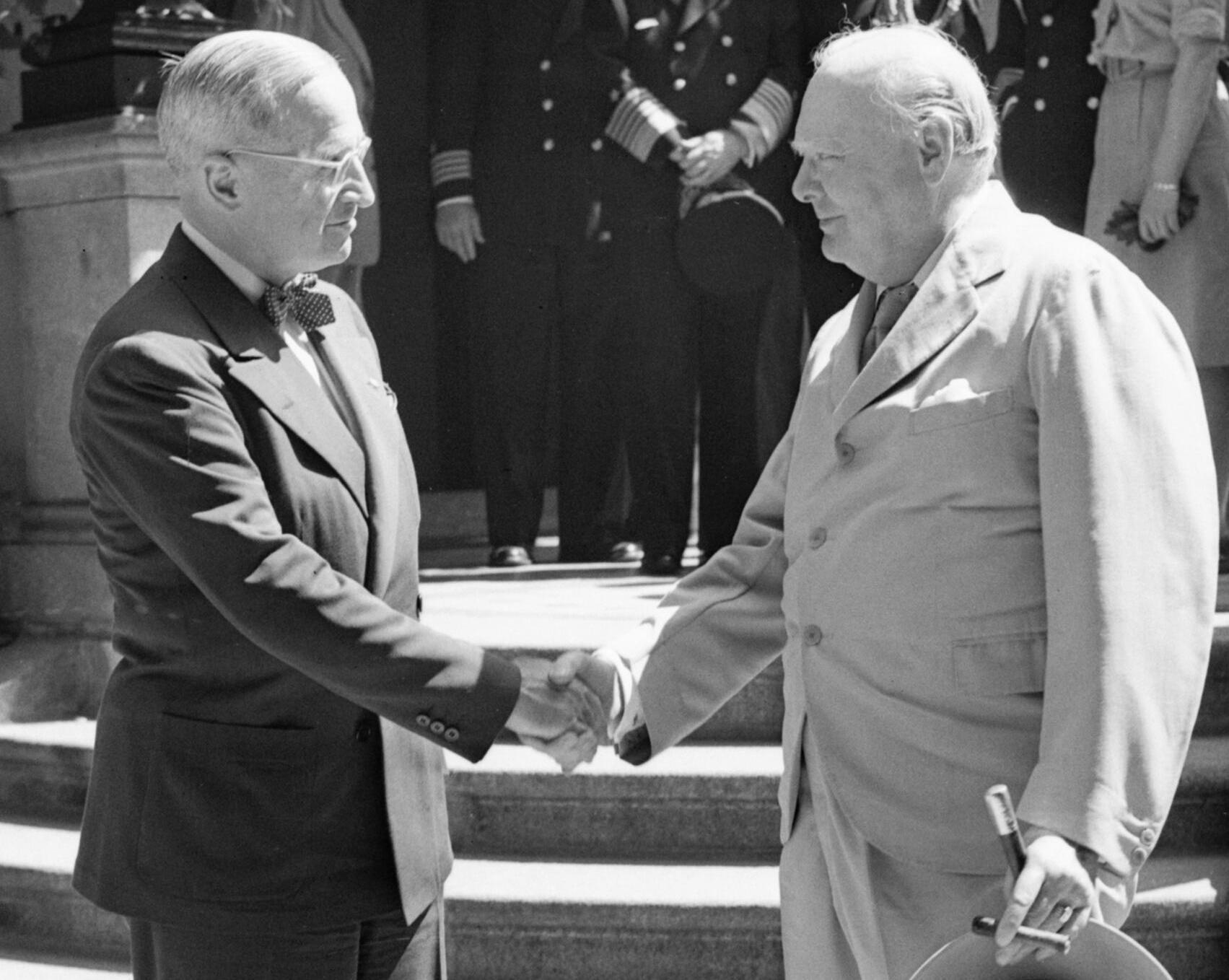
Truman shakes hands with Churchill on 16 July 1945 (the first day of the Potsdam Conference, and only ten days before Churchill lost the premiership upon the announcement of the results of the 1945 election).

Roosevelt died in April 1945, shortly into his fourth term in office, and was succeeded by his vice president, Harry Truman. Churchill and Truman likewise developed a strong relationship with one another. While he was saddened by the death of Roosevelt, Churchill was a strong supporter of Truman in his early presidency, calling him, "the type of leader the world needs when it needs him most." At the Potsdam Conference, Truman and Churchill, along with Joseph Stalin, made agreements for settling the boundaries of Europe.

=== Attlee and Truman (July 1945 – October 1951) ===
Four months into Truman's presidency, Churchill's party was handed a surprise defeat at the polls, and Clement Attlee became prime minister.

The deputy in Churchill's wartime coalition government, Attlee had been in the US at the time of Roosevelt's death, and thus had met with Truman immediately after he took office. The two of them had come to like one another. However, Attlee and Truman never became particularly close with one another. During their coinciding tenure as heads of government, they only met on three occasions. The two did not maintain regular correspondence. Their working relationship with each other, nonetheless, remained sturdy.

When Attlee assumed the position of prime minister, negotiations had not yet been completed at the Potsdam Conference, which had begun on 17 July. Attlee took Churchill's place at the conference once he was named prime minister on 26 July. Therefore, Attlee's first sixteen days as prime minister were spent handling negotiations at the conference. Attlee flew to Washington in December 1950 to support Truman in standing up against Douglas MacArthur. In 1951, Truman pressured Attlee not to intervene against Mossadeq in Iran. In his time as prime minister, Attlee also managed to convince Truman to agree to greater nuclear cooperation.

=== Churchill and Truman (October 1951 – January 1953) ===
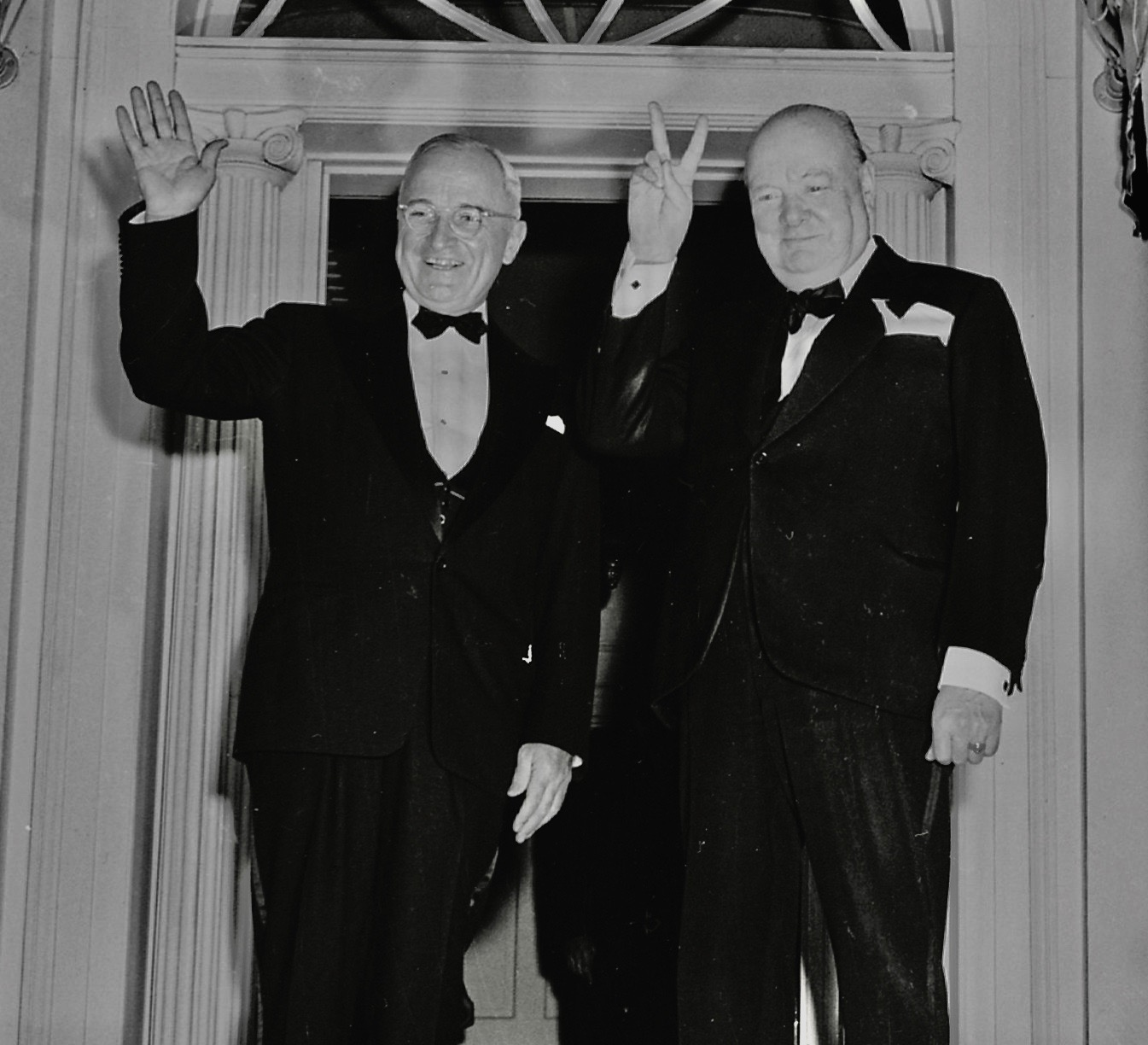
Truman and Churchill standing outside Blair House in 1949

Churchill became prime minister again in October 1951. He had maintained his relationship with Truman during his six-year stint as Leader of the Opposition. In 1946, on invitation from Truman, Churchill visited the U.S. to deliver a speech at Westminster College in Truman's home state of Missouri. The speech, which would be remembered as the "Iron Curtain" speech, affected greater public attention to the schism that had developed between the Soviet Union and the rest of the Allied Powers. During this trip, Churchill lost a significant amount of cash in a poker game with Harry Truman and his advisors. In 1947, Churchill had written Truman an unheeded memo recommending that the US make a pre-emptive atomic bomb strike on Moscow before the Soviet Union could acquire nuclear weapons themselves.

Churchill and Eden visited Washington in January 1952. At the time, Truman's administration was supporting plans for a European Defence Community in hopes that it would allow West Germany to undergo rearmament, consequentially enabling the U.S. to decrease the number of American troops stationed in Germany. Churchill opposed the EDC, feeling that it could not work. He also asked, unsuccessfully, for the US to commit its forces to supporting Britain in Egypt and the Middle East. This had no appeal for Truman. Truman expected the British to assist the Americans in their fight against communist forces in Korea, but felt that supporting the British in the Middle East would be assisting them in their efforts to prevent decolonization, which would do nothing to thwart communism. Truman opted not to seek re-election in 1952, and his presidency ended in January 1953.

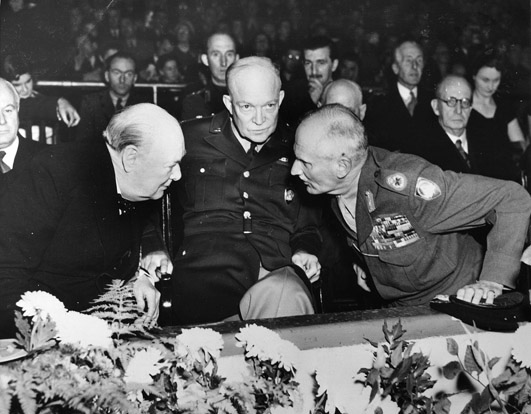
Eisenhower (center) sits between Churchill (left) and Bernard Montgomery at a NATO conference in October 1951. Eisenhower would be elected president just over a year later.

=== Churchill and Eisenhower (January 1953 – April 1955) ===
Dwight D. Eisenhower and Churchill were both familiar with one another, as they had both been significant leaders of the Allied effort during World War II.

On 5 January 1953, when Eisenhower was president-elect, Winston Churchill had a series of meetings with Eisenhower during a visit by Churchill to the United States. Relations were strained during Eisenhower's presidency by Eisenhower's outrage over Churchill's half-baked attempt to set up a "parley at the summit" with Joseph Stalin.

=== Eden and Eisenhower (April 1955 – January 1957) ===
Similarly to his predecessor, Anthony Eden had worked closely with Eisenhower during World War II.

==== Suez Crisis ====
When Eden took office, Gamal Abdel Nasser had built up Egyptian nationalism. Nasser seized control of the vital Suez Canal in July 1956. Eden made a secret agreement with France and Israel to invade Egypt. Eisenhower had repeatedly warned Eden that the US would not accept British military intervention. When the invasion came anyway, the US denounced it at the United Nations, and used financial power to force the British to completely withdraw. Britain lost its prestige and its powerful role in Mid-Eastern affairs, to be replaced by the Americans. Eden, in poor health, was forced to retire.

=== Macmillan and Eisenhower (January 1957 – January 1961) ===
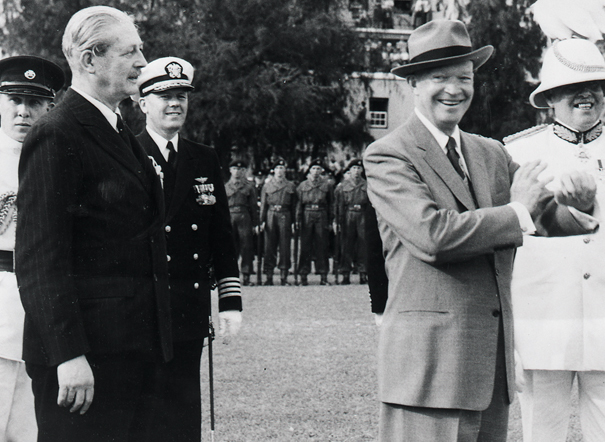
Macmillan and Eisenhower meet in March 1957 for talks in Bermuda, aiming to repair Anglo-American relationships in the aftermath of the previous year's Suez Crisis.

Once he took office, Harold Macmillan worked to undo the strain that the Special Relationship had incurred in the preceding years. Macmillan famously quipped that it was Britain's historical duty to guide the power of the US as the ancient Greeks had the Romans. He endeavoured to broaden the Special Relationship beyond Churchill's conception of an English-Speaking Union into a more inclusive "Atlantic Community". His key theme, "of the interdependence of the nations of the Free World and the partnership which must be maintained between Europe and the United States", was one that Kennedy subsequently took up.

However, Eisenhower increased tension with the UK by sabotaging Macmillan's policy of détente with the Soviet Union at the May 1960 Paris summit.

=== Macmillan and Kennedy (January 1961 – October 1963) ===
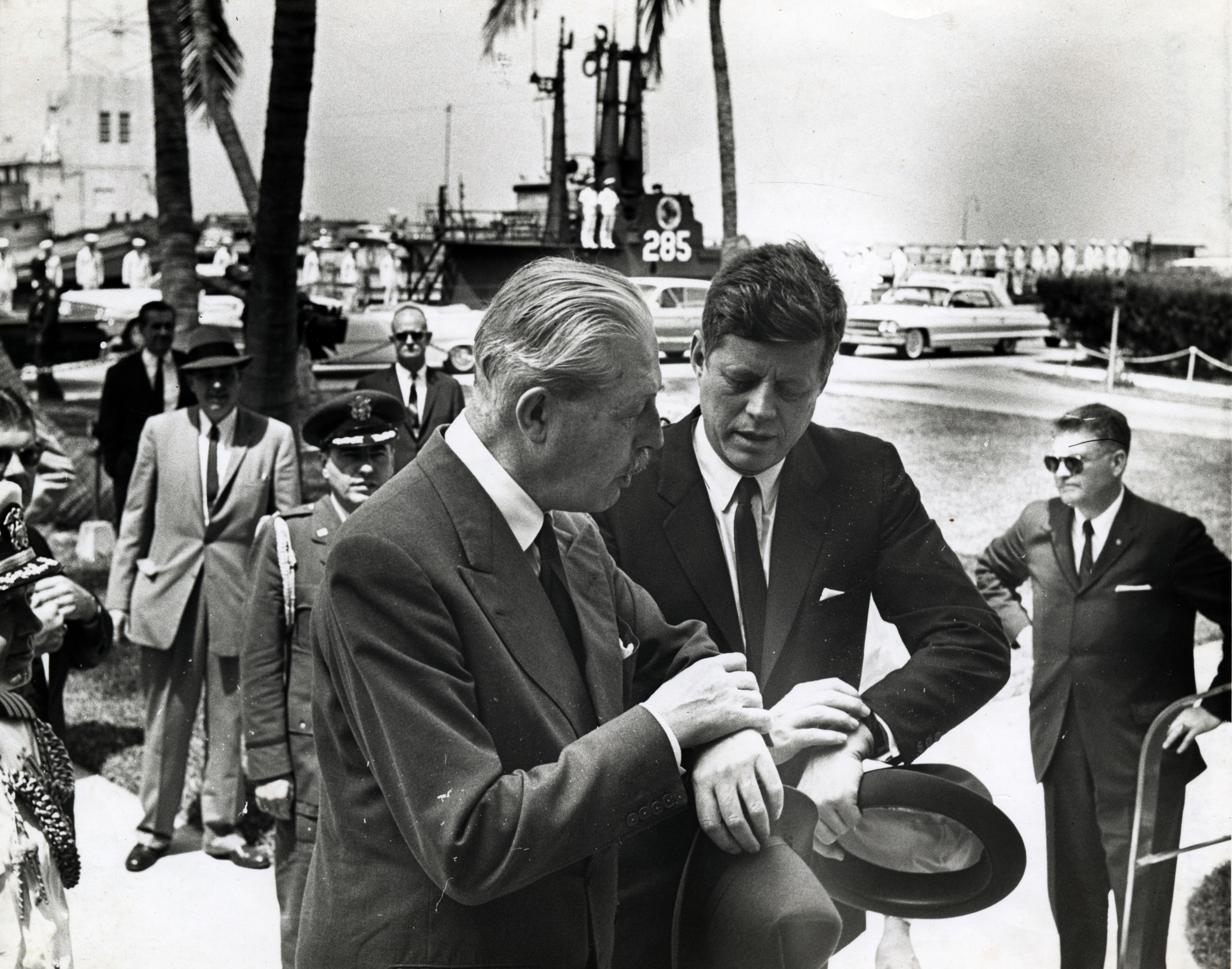
Macmillan and Kennedy at Key West in 1961

Kennedy was an anglophile. His father had previously served as the US ambassador to the UK and his sister had been Marchioness of Hartington, whose husband was incidentally the nephew of Macmillan's wife.

British intelligence assisted the US in assessing the Cuban Missile Crisis. Kennedy appreciated Macmillan's steady leadership, and admired his Partial Nuclear Test Ban Treaty.

==== Skybolt crisis ====
The Special Relationship was perhaps tested the most severely by the Skybolt crisis of 1962, when Kennedy cancelled a joint project without consultation. Skybolt was a nuclear air-to-ground missile that could penetrate Soviet airspace and would extend the life of Britain's deterrent, which consisted only of free-falling hydrogen bombs. London saw cancellation as a reduction in the British nuclear deterrent. The crisis was resolved during a series of compromises that led to the Royal Navy purchasing the American UGM-27 Polaris missile and construction of the Resolution-class submarines to launch them. The debates over Skybolt were top secret, but tensions were exacerbated when Dean Acheson, a former secretary of state, challenged publicly the Special Relationship and marginalised the British contribution to the Western alliance. Acheson said:

Great Britain has lost an empire and has not yet found a role. The attempt to play a separate power role—that is, a role apart from Europe, a role based on a 'Special Relationship' with the United States, a role based on being the head of a 'Commonwealth' which has no political structure, or unity, or strength and enjoys a fragile and precarious economic relationship—this role is about played out.

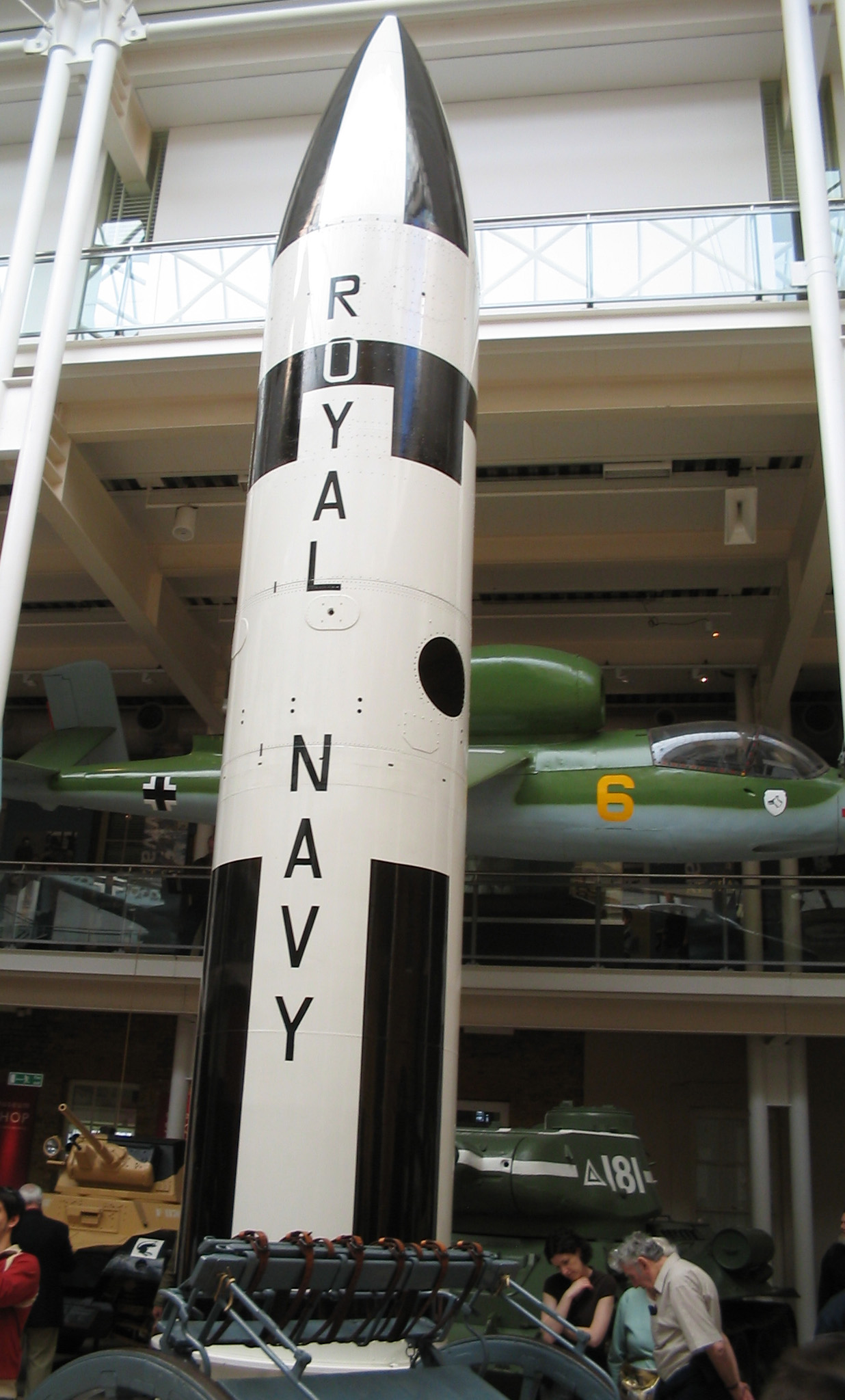
A British UGM-27 Polaris missile at the Imperial War Museum in London

On learning of Acheson's attack, Macmillan thundered in public:

In so far as he appeared to denigrate the resolution and will of Britain and the British people, Mr. Acheson has fallen into an error which has been made by quite a lot of people in the course of the last four hundred years, including Philip of Spain, Louis XIV, Napoleon, the Kaiser and Hitler. He also seems to misunderstand the role of the Commonwealth in world affairs. In so far as he referred to Britain's attempt to play a separate power role as about to be played out, this would be acceptable if he had extended this concept to the US and to every other nation in the free world. This is the doctrine of interdependence, which must be applied in the world today, if peace and prosperity are to be assured. I do not know whether Mr. Acheson would accept the logical sequence of his own argument. I am sure it is fully recognised by the US administration and by the American people.

The looming collapse of the alliance between the two thermonuclear powers forced Kennedy into an about-face at the Anglo-American summit in Nassau, where he agreed to sell Polaris as a replacement for the cancelled Skybolt. Richard E. Neustadt in his official investigation concluded the crisis in the Special Relationship had erupted because "the president's 'Chiefs' failed to make a proper strategic assessment of Great Britain's intentions and its capabilities".

The Skybolt crisis with Kennedy came on top of Eisenhower's wrecking of Macmillan's policy of détente with the Soviet Union at the May 1960 Paris summit, and the prime minister's resulting disenchantment with the Special Relationship contributed to his decision to seek an alternative in British membership of the European Economic Community (EEC). According to a recent analyst: "What the prime minister in effect adopted was a hedging strategy in which ties with Washington would be maintained while at the same time a new power base in Europe was sought." Even so, Kennedy assured Macmillan "that relations between the United States and the UK would be strengthened not weakened, if the UK moved towards membership."

=== Douglas-Home and Kennedy (October 1963 – November 1963) ===
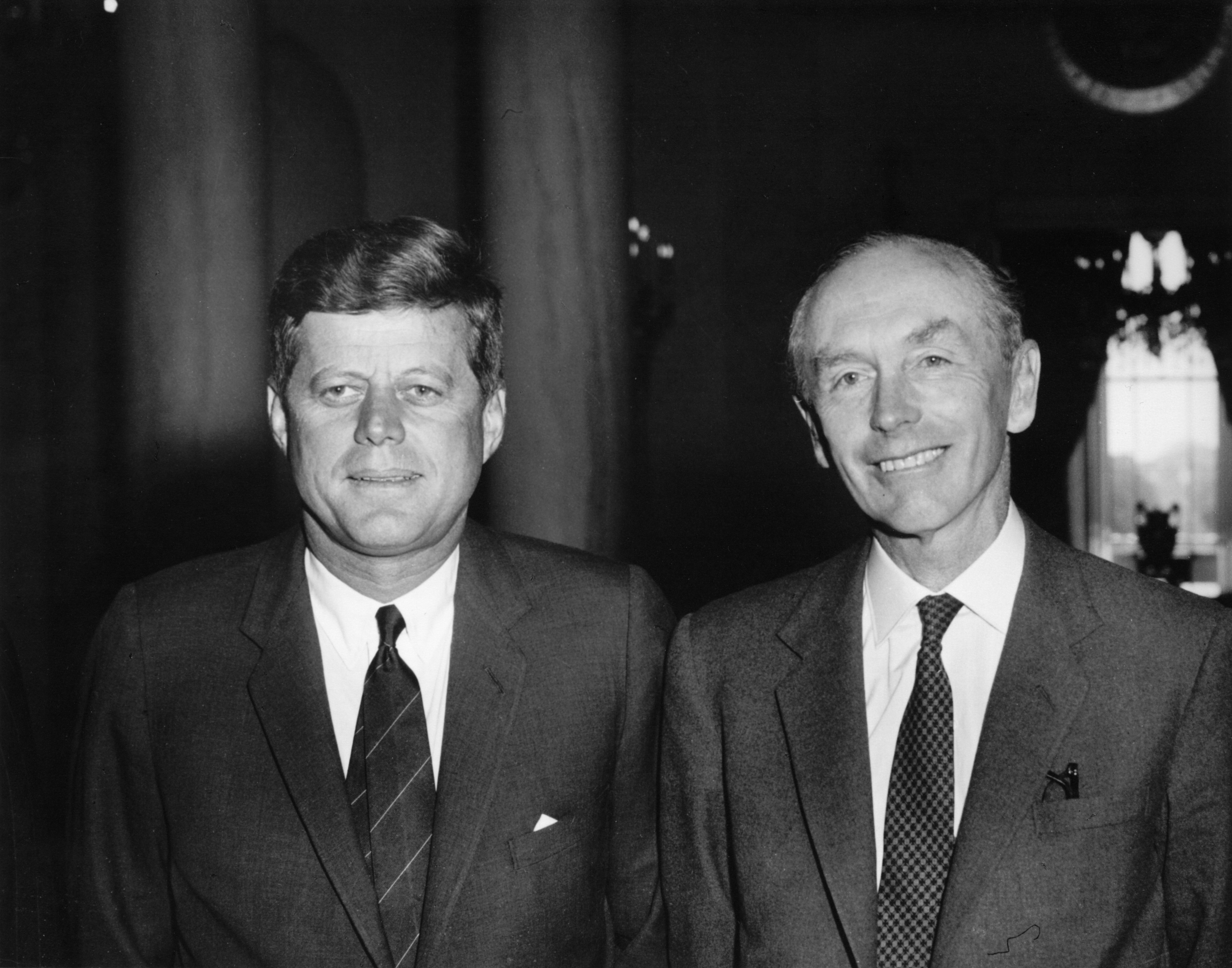
Kennedy hosts (then-Foreign Secretary) Douglas-Home at the White House in 1962.

Alec Douglas-Home only entered the race to replace the resigning Macmillan as Leader of the Conservative Party after learning from the British ambassador to the US that the Kennedy administration was uneasy at the prospect of Quintin Hogg being prime minister. Douglas-Home, however, would only serve as prime minister for a little over a month before Kennedy was assassinated.

In England, Kennedy's assassination in November 1963 caused a profound shock and sadness expressed by many politicians, religious leaders, and luminaries of literature and the arts. The archbishop of Canterbury led a memorial service at St Paul's Cathedral. Sir Laurence Olivier at the end of his next performance called for a moment of silence, followed by a playing of "The Star Spangled Banner". Prime Minister Douglas-Home led parliamentary tributes to Kennedy, whom he called, "the most loyal and faithful of allies." Douglas-Home was visibly upset during his remarks, as he was truly saddened by Kennedy's death. He had liked Kennedy, and had begun to establish a positive working relationship with him.

After his assassination, the British government sought approval to build a memorial to President Kennedy, in part to demonstrate the strength of the Special Relationship. However, the weak popular response to its ambitious fundraising campaign was a surprise, and suggested a grassroots opposition to the late president, his policies, and the United States.

=== Douglas-Home and Johnson (November 1963 – October 1964) ===
Douglas-Home had a far more tense relationship with Kennedy's successor, Lyndon B. Johnson. Douglas-Home failed to develop a good relationship with Lyndon Johnson. Their governments had a serious disagreement on the question of British trade with Cuba.

Relations between the two nations worsened after British Leyland busses were sold to Cuba, thus undermining the effectiveness of the United States embargo against Cuba. Douglas-Home's Conservative Party lost the 1964 general election, thus he lost his position as prime minister. He had only served as prime minister for 363 days, the U.K.'s second shortest premiership of the twentieth century. Despite its unusual brevity (and due to the assassination of Kennedy), Douglas-Home's tenure had overlapped with two US presidencies.

=== Wilson and Johnson (October 1964 – January 1969) ===
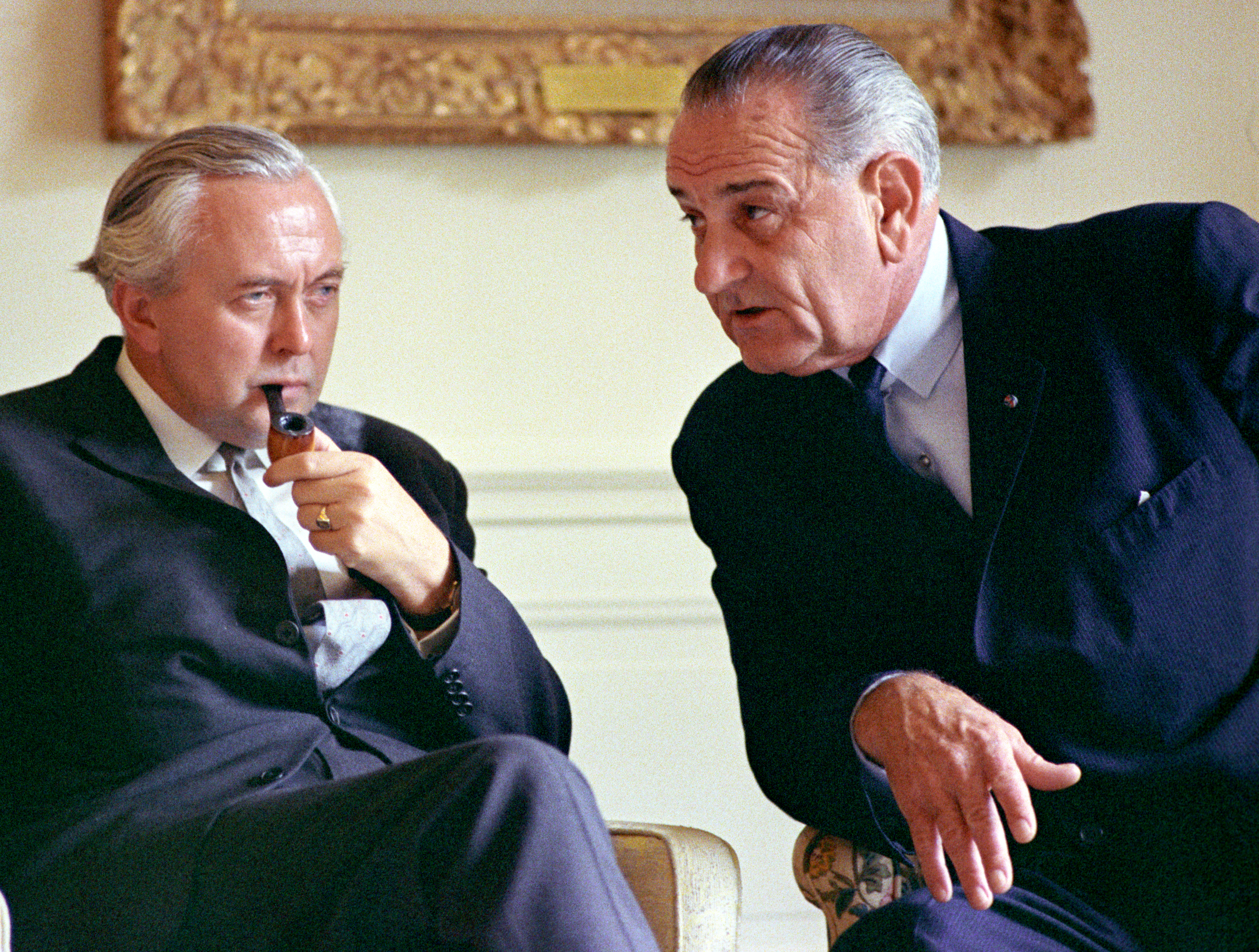
Wilson and Johnson meet at the White House in 1966.

Prime Minister Harold Wilson recast the alliance as a "close relationship", but neither he nor President Lyndon B. Johnson had any direct experience of foreign policy. Johnson sent Secretary of State Dean Rusk as head of the American delegation to the state funeral of Winston Churchill in January 1965, rather than the new vice president Hubert Humphrey. Johnson himself had been hospitalized with influenza and advised by his doctors against attending the funeral. This perceived slight generated much criticism against the president, both in the U.K. and in the U.S. And Wilson's attempt to mediate in Vietnam, where the United Kingdom was co-chairman with the Soviet Union of the Geneva Conference, was unwelcome to the president. "I won't tell you how to run Malaysia and you don't tell us how to run Vietnam", Johnson snapped in 1965. However, relations were sustained by U.S. recognition that Wilson was being criticised at home by his neutralist Labour left for not condemning American involvement in the war.

U.S. defense secretary Robert McNamara asked Britain to send troops to Vietnam as "the unwritten terms of the Special Relationship", Wilson agreed to help in many ways but refused to commit regular forces, only special forces instructors. There was much speculation that Wilson's refusals were partially due to the Americans not supporting Britain during the Suez Crisis. Australia and New Zealand did commit regular forces to Vietnam.

The Johnson administration's support for IMF loans delayed devaluation of sterling until 1967. The United Kingdom's subsequent withdrawal from the Persian Gulf and East Asia surprised Washington, where it was strongly opposed because British forces were valued for their contribution. In retrospect Wilson's moves to scale back Britain's global commitments and correct its balance of payments contrasted with Johnson's overexertions which accelerated the relative economic and military decline of the US.

=== Wilson and Nixon (January 1969 – June 1970) ===
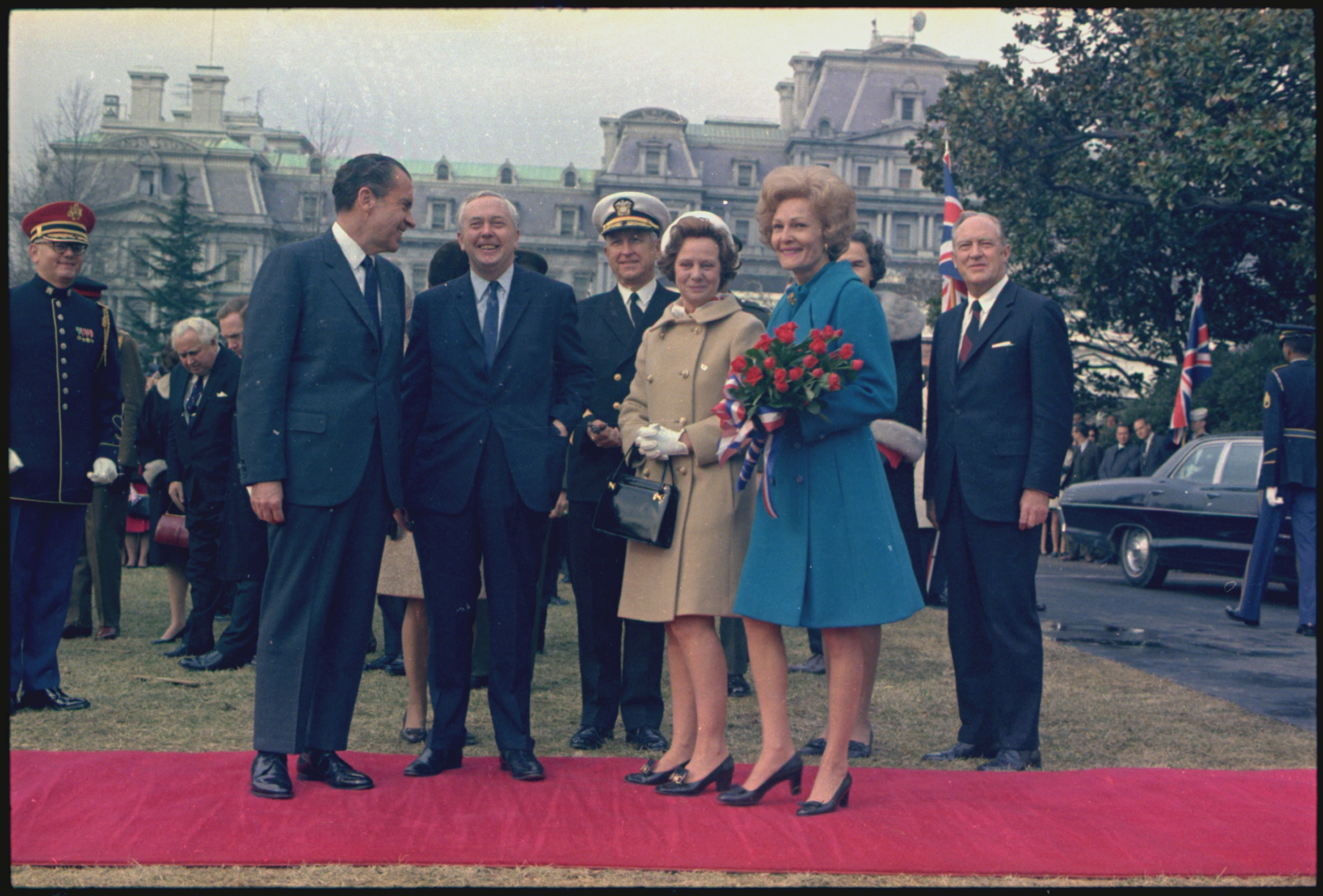
Wilson visiting the White House in January 1970

By the time Richard Nixon had taken office, many issues of tension between the two nations had been resolved. This allowed for the Special Relationship to blossom.

In a speech delivered on 27 January 1970 at a state dinner welcoming the prime minister in his visit to the US Nixon said,

Mr. Prime Minister, I am delighted to welcome you here today as an old friend; as an old friend not only in government, but as an old friend personally. I noted from reading the background, that this is your 21st visit to the United States, and your seventh visit as Prime Minister of your government.

And I noted, too, in looking at the relationship that we have had since I assumed office a year ago, that we met twice in London, once in February, again in August; that we have had a great deal of correspondence; we have talked several times on the telephone. But what is even more important is the substance of those conversations. The substance did not involve differences between your country and ours. The substance of those conversations was with regard to the great issues in which we have a common interest and a common purpose, the development of peace in the world, progress for your people, for our people, for all people. This is the way it should be. This is the way we both want it. And it is an indication of the way to the future.

Winston Churchill once said on one of his visits to this country that, if we are together, nothing is impossible. Perhaps in saying that nothing is impossible, that was an exaggeration. But it can be said today—we are together, and being together, a great deal is possible. And I am sure that our talks will make some of those things possible.

=== Heath and Nixon (June 1970 – March 1974) ===
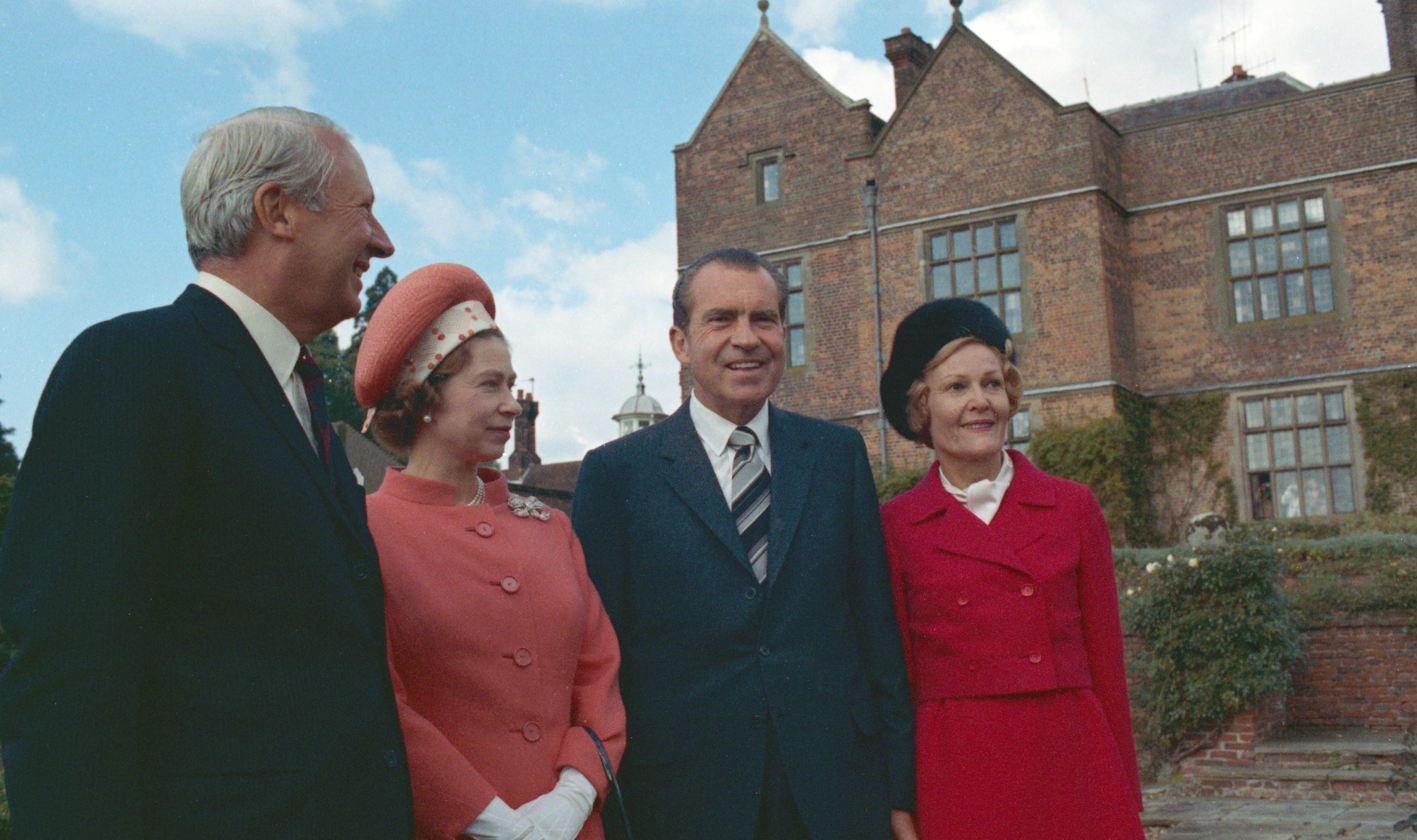
Prime Minister Edward Heath and Queen Elizabeth II with President Richard M. Nixon and First Lady Pat Nixon during the Nixons' 1970 visit to the United Kingdom

A Europeanist, Prime Minister Edward Heath preferred to speak of a "'natural relationship', based on shared culture and heritage", and stressed that the Special Relationship was "not part of his own vocabulary".

The Heath–Nixon era was dominated by the United Kingdom's 1973 entry into the European Economic Community (EEC). Although the two leaders' 1971 Bermuda communiqué restated that entry served the interests of the Atlantic Alliance, American observers voiced concern that the British government's membership would impair its role as an honest broker, and that, because of the European goal of political union, the Special Relationship would only survive if it included the whole Community.

Critics accused President Nixon of impeding the EEC's inclusion in the Special Relationship by his economic policy, which dismantled the postwar international monetary system and sought to force open European markets for US exports. Detractors also slated the personal relationship at the top as "decidedly less than special"; Prime Minister Edward Heath, it was alleged, "hardly dared put through a phone call to Richard Nixon for fear of offending his new Common Market partners."

The Special Relationship was "soured" during the Arab–Israeli War of 1973 when Nixon failed to inform Heath that US forces had been put on DEFCON 3 in a worldwide standoff with the Soviet Union, and US secretary of state Henry Kissinger misled the British ambassador over the nuclear alert. Heath, who learned about the alert only from press reports hours later, confessed: "I have found considerable alarm as to what use the Americans would have been able to make of their forces here without in any way consulting us or considering the British interests." The incident marked "a low ebb" in the Special Relationship. Heath refused the US permission to use any of the UK's air bases to resupply during the Yom Kippur War, or to allow the Americans to gather intelligence from British bases in Cyprus.

=== Wilson and Nixon (March 1974 – August 1974) ===
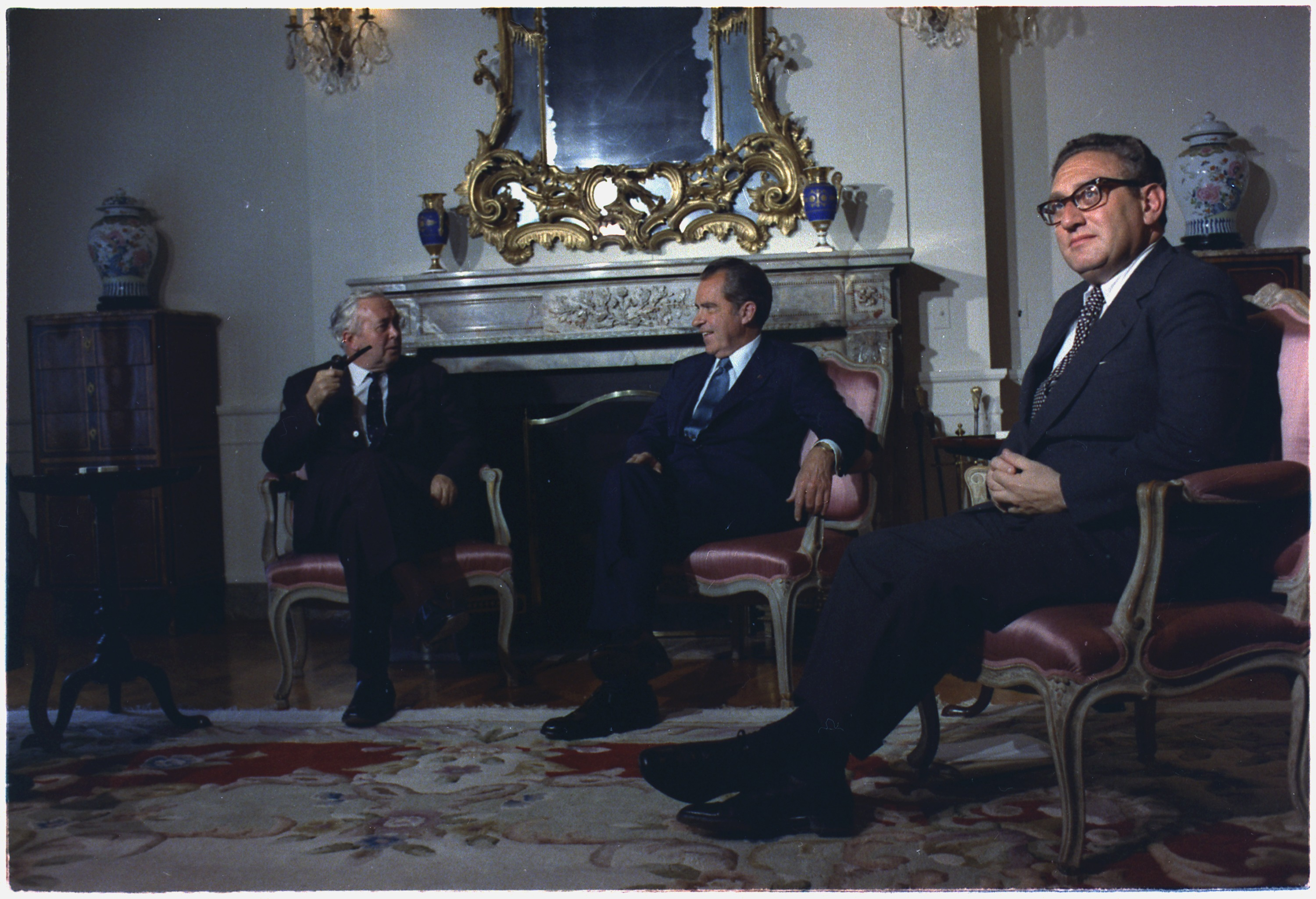
Prime Minister Harold Wilson (left), President Richard Nixon (centre) and Henry Kissinger (right) in June 1974

Wilson and Nixon once again concurrently served as leaders of the two nations for a six-month period spanning from the start of Wilson's second tenure as Prime Minister until Nixon's resignation. Wilson held Nixon in high regard. After he left office himself, Wilson praised Nixon as America's "most able" president.

=== Wilson and Ford (August 1974 – April 1976) ===
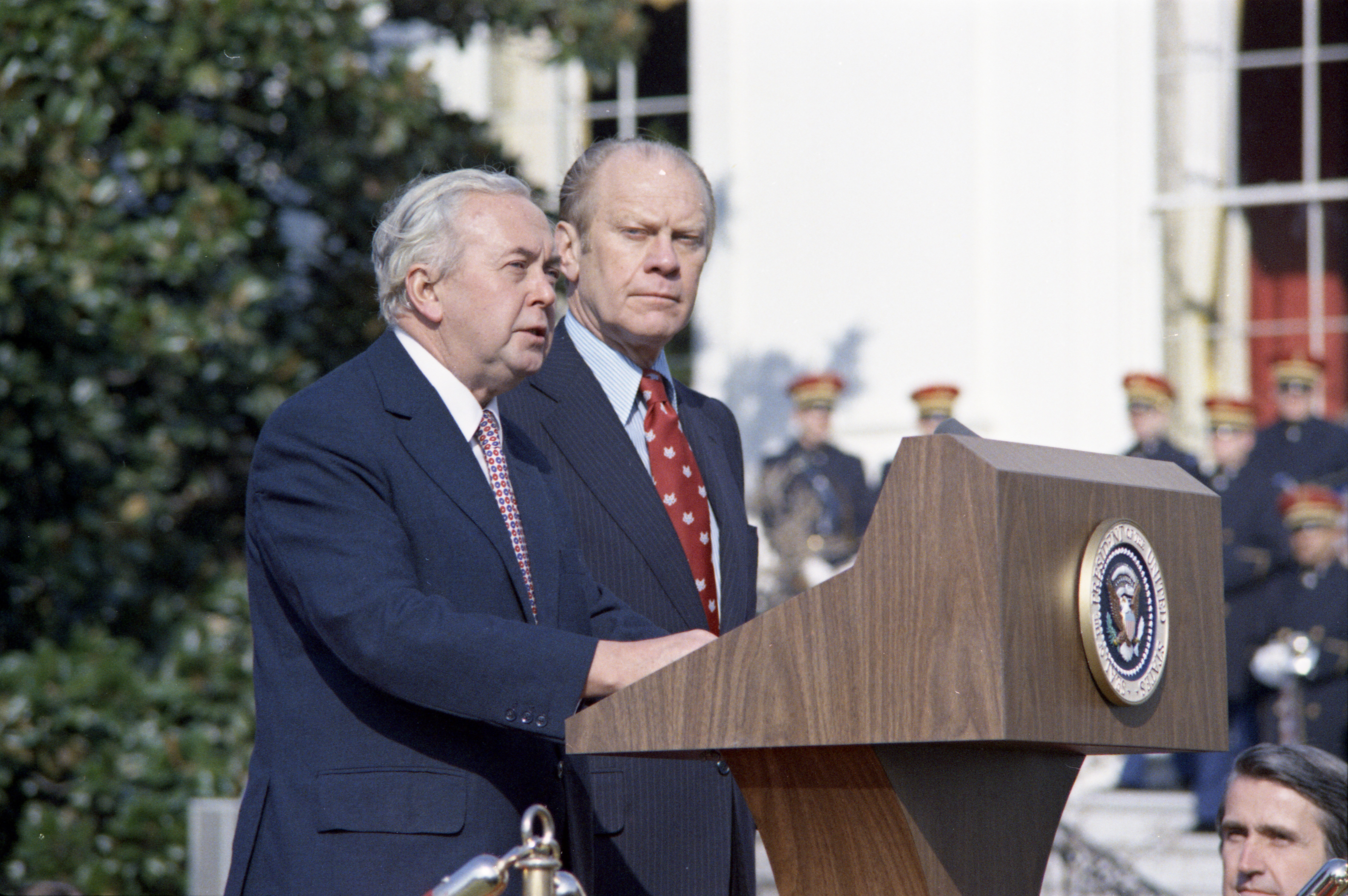
Wilson and Ford in the White House Rose Garden in January 1975

Gerald Ford became president after Nixon's resignation. In a toast to Wilson at a January 1975 state dinner, Ford remarked,

It gives me a very great deal of pleasure to welcome you again to the United States. You are no stranger, of course, to this city and to this house. Your visits here over the years as a staunch ally and a steadfast friend are continuing evidence of the excellence of the ties between our countries and our people.

You, Mr. Prime Minister, are the honored leader of one of America's truest allies and oldest friends. Any student of American history and American culture knows how significant is our common heritage. We have actually continued to share a wonderful common history

Americans can never forget how the very roots of our democratic political system and of our concepts of liberty and government are to be found in Britain. Over the years, Britain and the United States have stood together as trusting friends and allies to defend the cause of freedom on a worldwide basis. Today, the North Atlantic Alliance remains the cornerstone of our common defense.

=== Callaghan and Ford (April 1976 – January 1977) ===
In April 1976, James Callaghan became prime minister after Wilson resigned the office. Ford and Callaghan were regarded as having a close relationship.

The British government saw the U.S. bicentennial in 1976 as an occasion to celebrate the Special Relationship. Political leaders and guests from both sides of the Atlantic gathered in May at Westminster Hall to mark the American Declaration of Independence of 1776. Prime Minister James Callaghan presented a visiting Congressional delegation with a gold-embossed reproduction of Magna Carta, symbolising the common heritage of the two nations. British historian Esmond Wright noted "a vast amount of popular identification with the American story". A year of cultural exchanges and exhibitions culminated in July in a state visit to the United States by the Queen.

Ford lost the 1976 election. Consequentially, his presidency ended in January 1977. President Ford had never managed to visit the United Kingdom during his presidency.

=== Callaghan and Carter (January 1977 – May 1979) ===
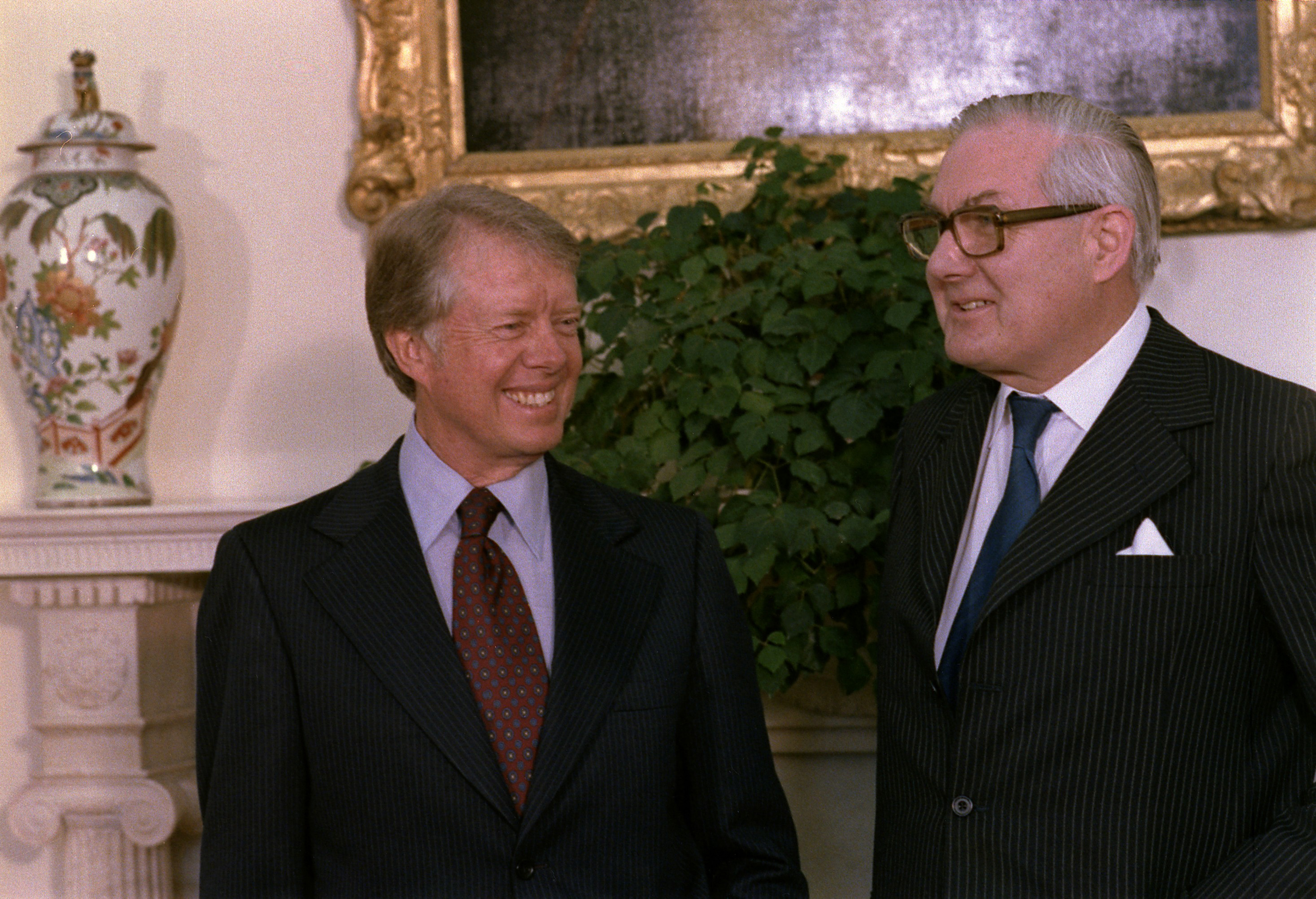
President Jimmy Carter (left) and Prime Minister James Callaghan (right) in the Oval Office in March 1978

After defeating the incumbent Gerald Ford in the 1976 election, Jimmy Carter was sworn in as President of the United States in January 1977. Ties between Callaghan and Carter were cordial but, with both left of centre governments being preoccupied with economic malaise, diplomatic contacts remained low key. US officials characterised relations in 1978 as "extremely good", with the main disagreement being over trans-Atlantic air routes.

During Callaghan's March 1977 visit to the White House, Carter affirmed that there was both a, "special relationship" and an "unbreakable friendship" between the two nations, declaring that, "Great Britain is still America's mother country." During this meeting, Callaghan praised Carter for enhancing, "the political tone of the world".

The economic malaise that Callaghan was facing at home developed into the "Winter of Discontent", which ultimately led to Callaghan's Labour Party losing the May 1979 general election, thus ending his tenure as prime minister.

=== Thatcher and Carter (May 1979 – January 1981) ===
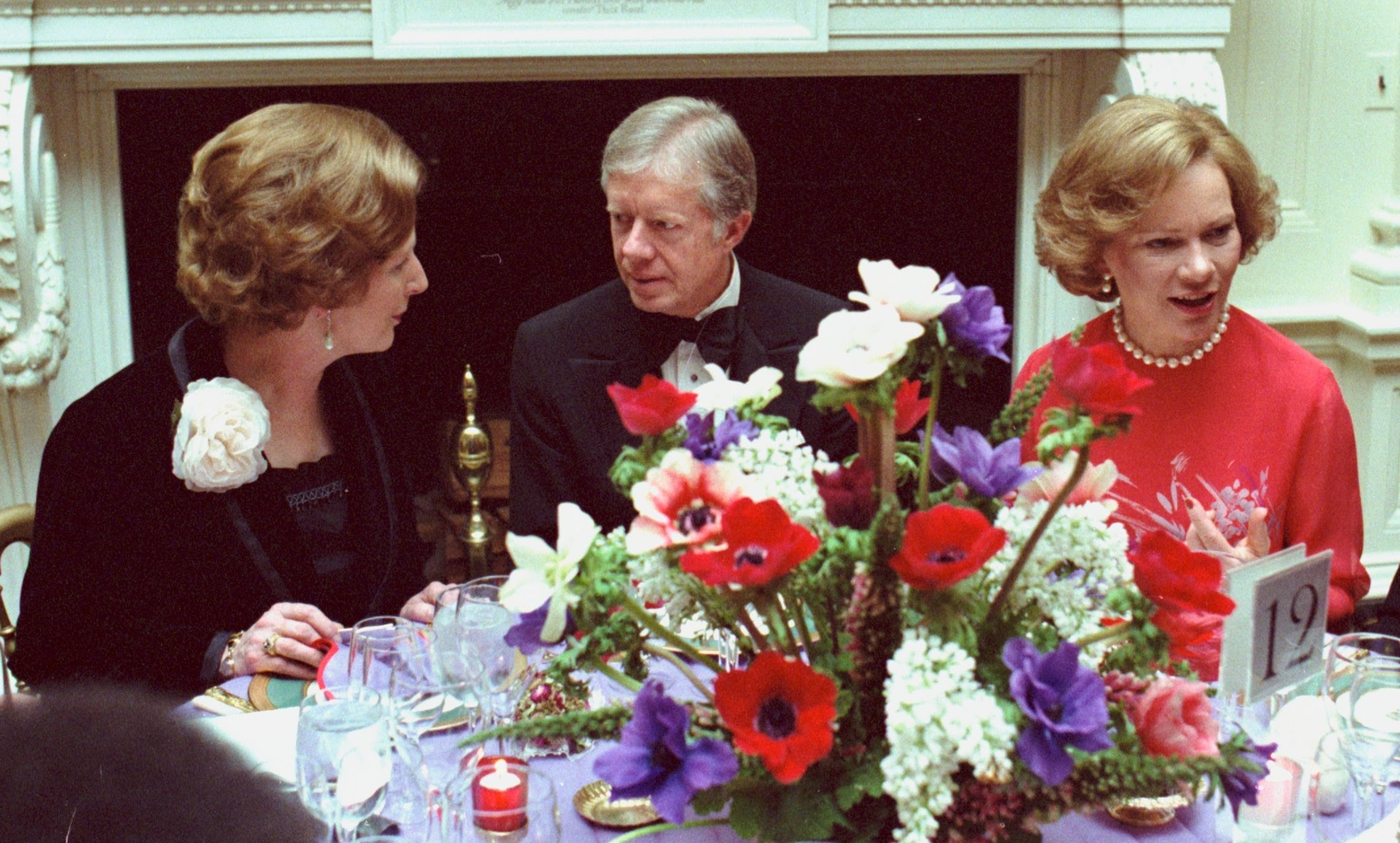
Jimmy and Rosalynn Carter hosting a state dinner for Margaret Thatcher at the White House during her 1979 visit to the United States

Conservative Party leader Margaret Thatcher became prime minister after her party won the 1979 United Kingdom general election. Relations between President Carter and Prime Minister Margaret Thatcher during the year-and-a-half overlap of their leadership have often been seen as relatively cool, especially when contrasted with the kinship that Thatcher would subsequently develop with Carter's successor Ronald Reagan. However, Carter's relationship with Thatcher never reached the levels of strain that Reagan's relationship would in the midst of the Falklands War.

Thatcher and Carter had clear differences in their political ideology. They both occupied relatively opposing ends of the political spectrum. By the time she had become prime minister, Thatcher had already met Carter on two previous occasions. Both of these encounters had initially left Carter with a negative impression of her. However, his opinion of Thatcher had reportedly become more placid by the time she was elected prime minister. Despite the tensions between the two, historian Chris Collins (of the Margaret Thatcher Foundation) has stated, "Carter is somebody she worked hard to get along with. She had considerable success at it. Had Carter lasted two terms we might be writing about the surprising amount of common ground between the two."

Carter congratulated Thatcher in a phone call after her party's victory in the general which elevated her to the office of prime minister, stating that the United States would, "look forward to working with you on an official basis." However, his congratulations was delivered with an audibly unenthusiastic tone. In her first full letter to Carter, Thatcher voiced her assurance of full support in the ratification of the SALT II nuclear arms treaty writing, "We will do all we can to assist you".

Both leaders were mutually facing great pressures during the overlap of their tenures as a national leader. Both of their nations were experiencing economic crisis due to the early 1980s recession. In addition, there was international upheaval in Eastern Europe and the Middle East. Among the areas of turmoil were Afghanistan (due to the Soviet–Afghan War) and Iran (where Carter was facing a hostage crisis following the Iranian Revolution).

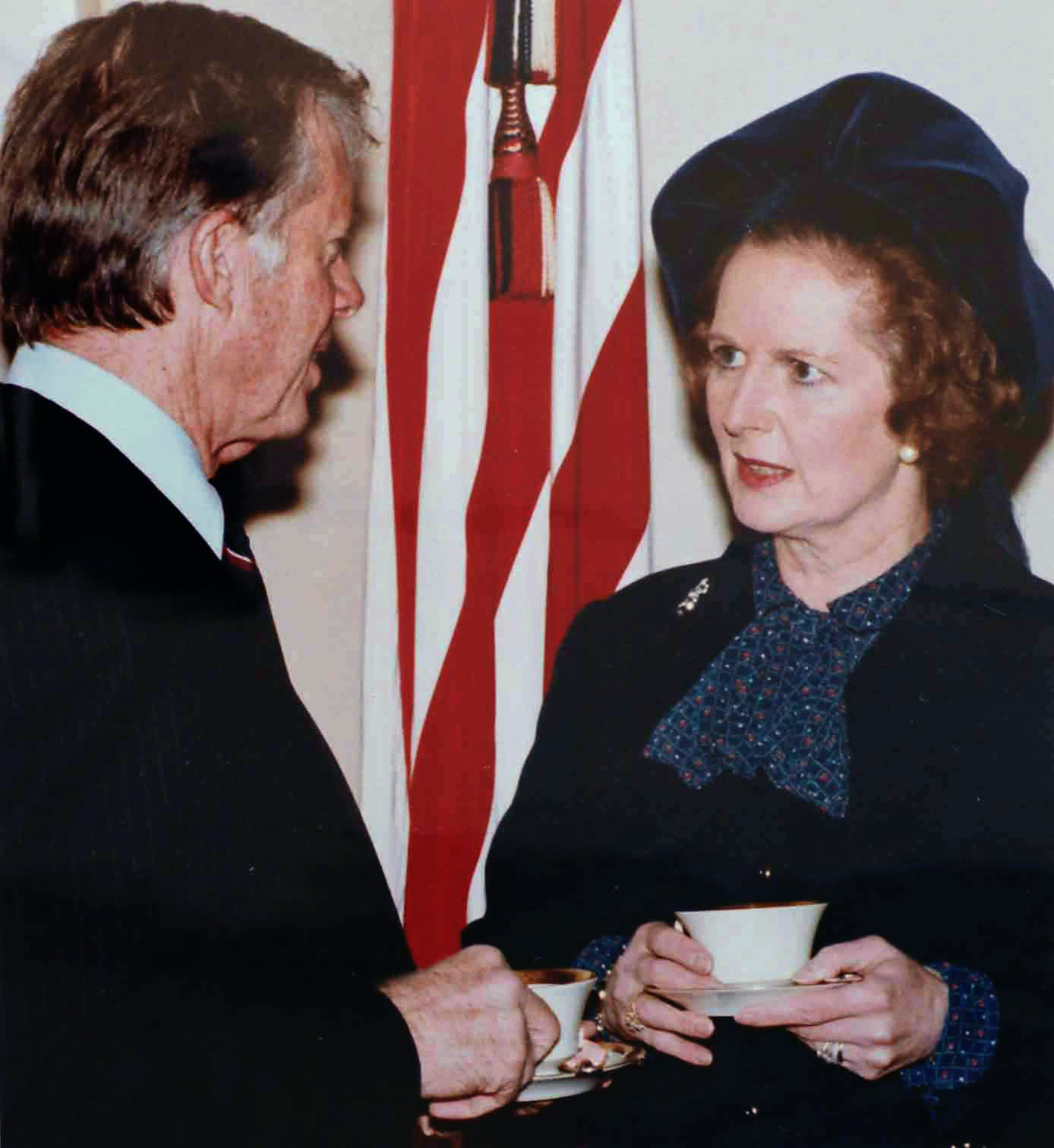
Carter with Thatcher having tea at the White House during her 1979 visit to the United States

Both Carter and Thatcher condemned the Soviet invasion of Afghanistan. They expressed concern to each other that other European nations were being too soft towards the Russians. Carter hoped that she could persuade other European nations to condemn the invasion. However, with a particularly tumultuous economic situation at home, and with most NATO members reluctant to cut trade ties with the USSR, Thatcher would only provide very weak support to Carter's efforts to punish the USSR through economic sanctions.

Thatcher was concerned that Carter was naive about Soviet relations. Nevertheless, Thatcher played a (perhaps pivotal) role in fulfilling Carter's desire for the U.N. adoption of a resolution demanding the withdrawal of Soviet troops from Afghanistan. Thatcher also encouraged British athletes to participate in the boycott of the 1980 Summer Olympics in Moscow, which Carter initiated in response to the invasion. However, Thatcher ultimately gave the country's Olympic Committee and individual athletes the choice to decide whether or not they would boycott the games. The United Kingdom ended up participating in the 1980 games, albeit with a smaller delegation due to individual athletes deciding to participate in boycotting the games.

In their correspondences, Thatcher expressed sympathy to Carter's troubled efforts to resolve the hostage crisis in Iran. However, she outright refused his request for her to decrease the presence of the British embassy in Iran. Thatcher provided Carter with praise on his handling of the US economy, sending him a letter endorsing his measures in handling economic inflation and in cutting gas consumption during the 1979 energy crisis as, "painful but necessary".

In October 1979 Thatcher wrote Carter, "I share your concern about Cuban and Soviet intentions in the Caribbean. This danger exists more widely in the developing world. It is essential that the Soviet Union should recognise your resolve in this matter. […] I am therefore especially encouraged by your statement that you are accelerating efforts to increase the capability of the United States to use its military forces world wide."

Also October 1979 there was a dispute over Thatcher's government's provision of funding for BBC's external services. In desperation, the BBC contacted United States ambassador Kingman Brewster Jr. to request that the US government endorse them in their fight against spending cuts. National Security Advisor Zbigniew Brzezinski discussed this request with the State Department, and even drafted a letter for Carter to send Thatcher. However, Brzezinski ultimately decided against advising Carter to involve himself in the BBC's efforts to lobby against budget cuts. During her December 1979 visit to the United States, Thatcher chastised Carter for not permitting the sale of arsenal to equip the Royal Ulster Constabulary. During this visit, she delivered a speech in which a lack of warmth towards Carter was evident. While Thatcher likely favoured her ideological counterpart Ronald Reagan to win the 1980 election (in which he defeated Carter), she was cautious to avoid voicing any such preference, even in private.

=== Thatcher and Reagan (January 1981 – January 1989) ===
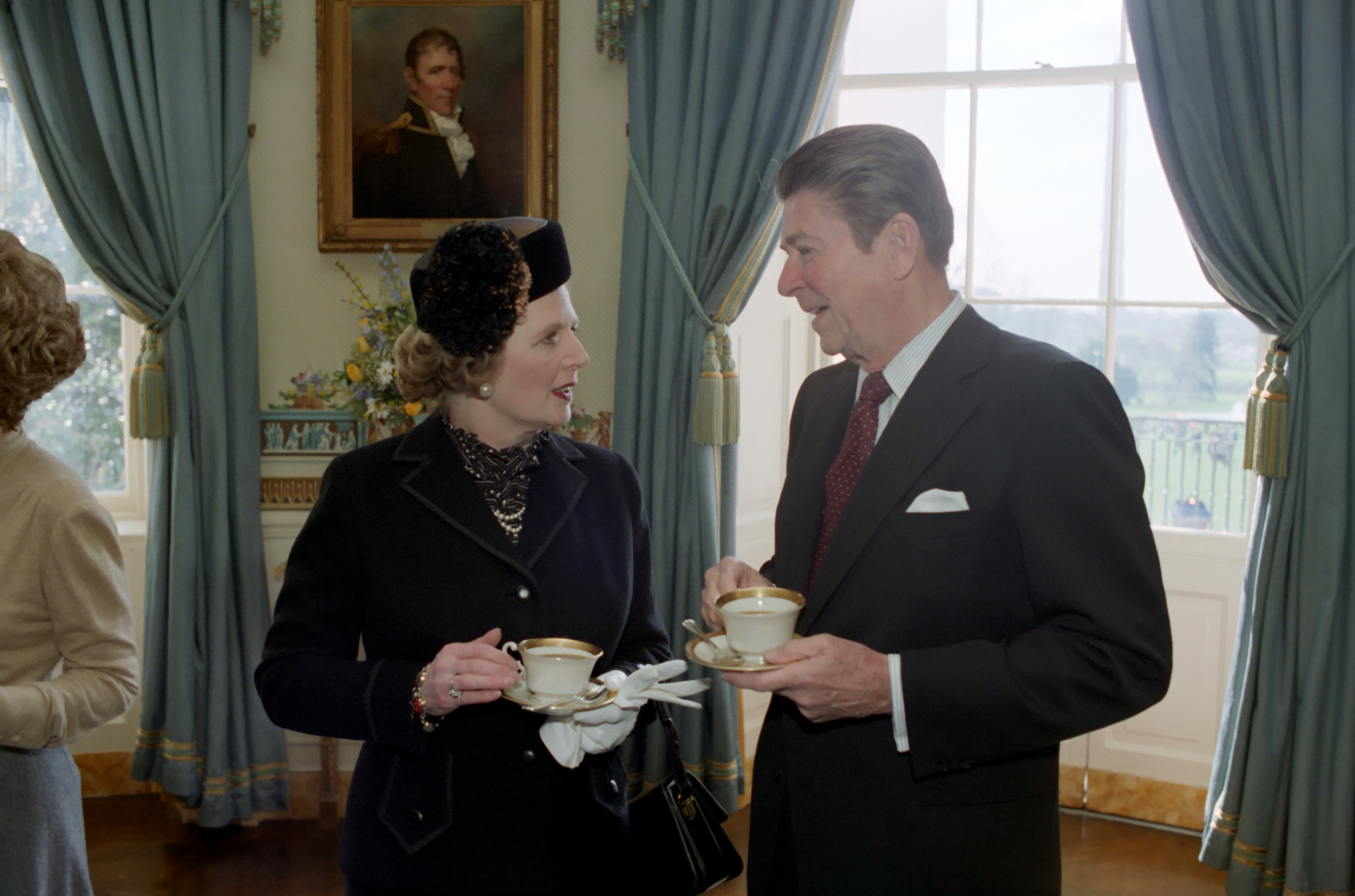
Prime Minister Margaret Thatcher (left) and President Ronald Reagan (right) in the Blue Room, February 1981

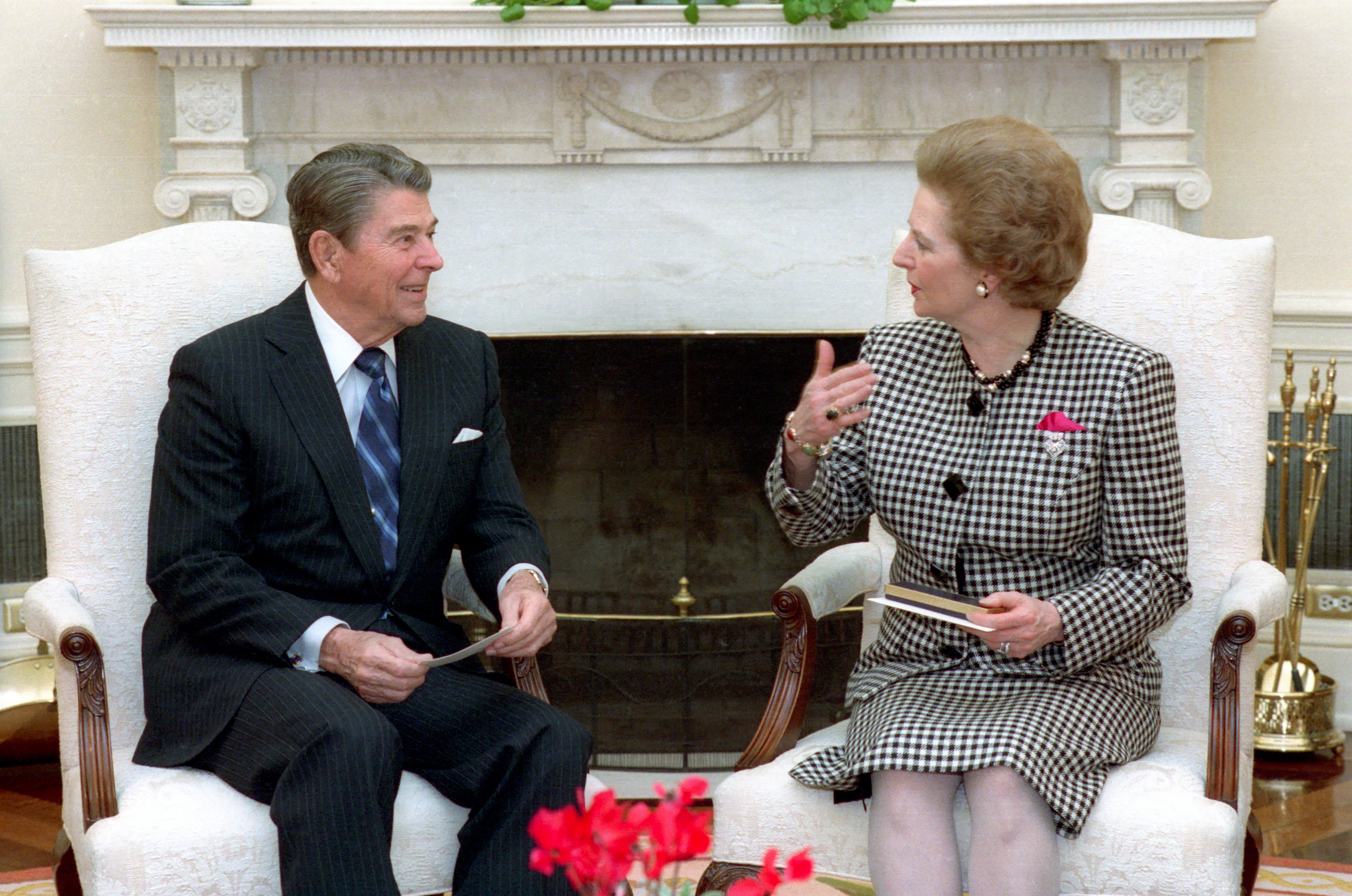
President Ronald Reagan (left) and Prime Minister Margaret Thatcher (right) in the Oval Office, November 1988

The personal friendship between President Ronald Reagan and Prime Minister Margaret Thatcher united them as "ideological soul-mates". They shared a commitment to the philosophy of the free market, low taxes, limited government, and a strong defence; they rejected détente and were determined to win the Cold War with the Soviet Union. However, they did have disagreements on internal social policies such as the AIDS epidemic and abortion. Thatcher summed up her understanding of the Special Relationship at her first meeting with Reagan as president in 1981: "Your problems will be our problems and when you look for friends we shall be there."

Celebrating the 200th anniversary of diplomatic relations in 1985, Thatcher enthused:

There is a union of mind and purpose between our peoples which is remarkable and which makes our relationship a truly remarkable one. It is special. It just is, and that's that.

Reagan, in turn, acknowledged:

The United States and the United Kingdom are bound together by inseparable ties of ancient history and present friendship ... There's been something very special about the friendships between the leaders of our two countries. And may I say to my friend the Prime Minister, I'd like to add two more names to this list of affection: Thatcher and Reagan.

In 1982, Thatcher and Reagan reached an agreement to replace the British Polaris fleet with a force equipped with US-supplied Trident missiles. The confidence between the two principals appeared momentarily strained by Reagan's belated support in the Falklands War, but this was more than countered by the Anglophile American defense secretary, Caspar Weinberger, who provided strong support in intelligence and munitions. It has since been revealed that while publicly claiming neutrality in the dispute between Argentina and Britain over the Falkland Islands, Reagan had approved a top-secret plan to loan a U.S. aircraft carrier to the British in the event that Argentine forces managed to sink one of the British carriers, and had told Weinberger to: "Give Maggie everything she needs to get on with it."

A July 2012 article by USNI News of the United States Naval Institute revealed that the Reagan Administration offered the use of the USS Iwo Jima as a replacement in case either of the two British carriers, Hermes and Invincible, had been damaged or destroyed during the 1982 Falklands War. This top-secret contingency plan was revealed to the staff of the Naval Institute by John Lehman, the U.S. Secretary of the Navy at the time of the Falklands War, from a speech provided to the Naval Institute that Lehman made in Portsmouth, UK on 26 June 2012. Lehman stated that the loan of Iwo Jima was made in response to a request from the Royal Navy, and it had the endorsement of U.S. President Ronald Reagan and U.S. Secretary of Defense Caspar Weinberger. The actual planning for the loan of Iwo Jima was done by the staff of the U.S. Second Fleet under the direction of Vice Admiral James Lyons, who confirmed Lehman's revelations with the Naval Institute staff. Contingency planning envisioned American military contractors, likely retired sailors with knowledge of Iwo Jima's systems, assisting the British in manning the U.S. helicopter carrier during the loan-out. Naval analyst Eric Wertheim compared this arrangement to the Flying Tigers. Significantly, except for U.S. Secretary of State Alexander Haig, the U.S. Department of State was not included in the loan-out negotiations.

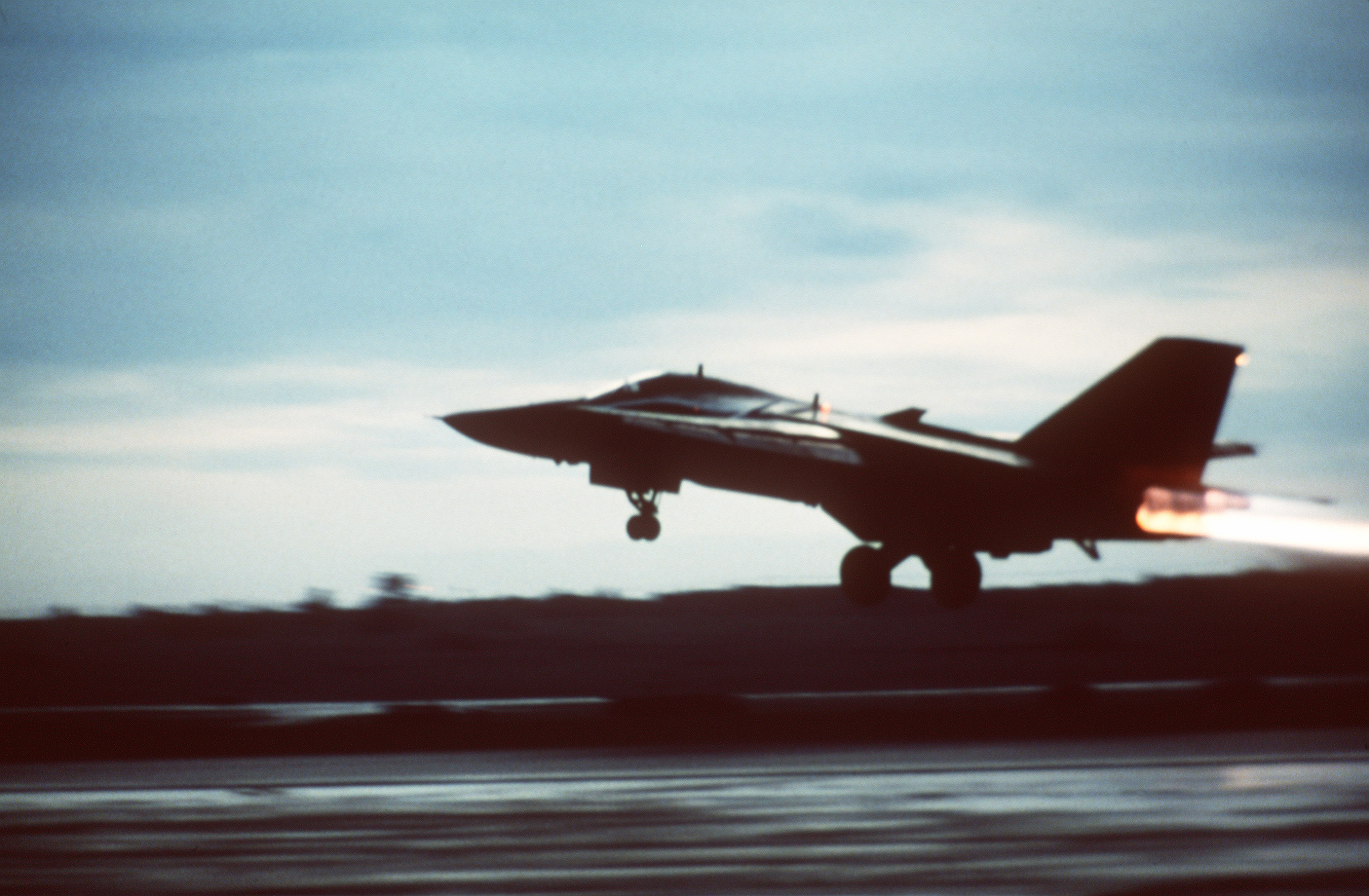
An American F-111F takes off from RAF Lakenheath to conduct an airstrike in Libya on 15 April 1986.

In 1986 Washington asked permission to use British airbases in order to bomb Libya in retaliation for the 1986 West Berlin discotheque bombing by Libyan terrorists that killed two U.S. servicemen. The British cabinet was opposed and Thatcher herself was worried it would lead to widespread attacks on British interests in the Middle East. That did not happen, and instead Libyan terrorism fell off sharply. Furthermore, although British public opinion was highly negative, Britain won widespread praise in the United States at a time when Spain and France had vetoed American requests to fly over their territories.

A more serious disagreement came in 1983 when Washington did not consult with London on the invasion of Grenada. Grenada is part of the Commonwealth of Nations and, following the invasion, it requested help from other Commonwealth members. The intervention was opposed by Commonwealth members including the United Kingdom, Trinidad and Tobago, and Canada, among others. British prime minister Margaret Thatcher, a close ally of Reagan on other matters, personally opposed the U.S. invasion. Reagan told her it might happen; she did not know for sure it was coming until three hours before. At 12:30 on the morning of the invasion, Thatcher sent a message to Reagan:

This action will be seen as intervention by a Western country in the internal affairs of a small independent nation, however unattractive its regime. I ask you to consider this in the context of our wider East/West relations and of the fact that we will be having in the next few days to present to our Parliament and people the siting of Cruise missiles in this country. I must ask you to think most carefully about these points. I cannot conceal that I am deeply disturbed by your latest communication. You asked for my advice. I have set it out and hope that even at this late stage you will take it into account before events are irrevocable. (The full text remains classified.)

Reagan told Thatcher before anyone else that the invasion would begin in a few hours, but ignored her complaints. She publicly supported the U.S. action. Reagan phoned to apologize for the miscommunication, and the long-term friendly relationship endured.

In 1986, the British defence secretary Michael Heseltine, a prominent critic of the Special Relationship and a supporter of European integration, resigned over his concern that a takeover of Britain's last helicopter manufacturer by a US firm would harm the British defence industry. Thatcher herself also saw a potential risk to Britain's deterrent and security posed by the Strategic Defense Initiative She was alarmed at Reagan's proposal at the Reykjavík Summit to eliminate nuclear weapons, but was relieved when the proposal failed.

All in all, Britain's needs figured more prominently in American thinking strategy than anyone else. Peter Hennessy, a leading historian, singles out the personal dynamic of "Ron" and "Margaret" in this success:

At crucial moments in the late 1980s, her influence was considerable in shifting perceptions in President Reagan's Washington about the credibility of Mr Gorbachev when he repeatedly asserted his intention to end the Cold War. That mercurial, much-discussed phenomenon, 'the special relationship,' enjoyed an extraordinary revival during the 1980s, with 'slips' like the US invasion of Grenada in 1983 apart, the Thatcher-Reagan partnership outstripping all but the prototype Roosevelt-Churchill duo in its warmth and importance. ('Isn't she marvellous'?' he would purr to his aides even while she berated him down the 'hot line.')

=== Thatcher and George H. W. Bush (January 1989 – November 1990) ===
Margaret Thatcher and Vice President George H. W. Bush in Washington, D.C., in July 1987

In his personal diary, George H. W. Bush wrote that his first impression of Thatcher was she was principled but very difficult. Bush also wrote that Thatcher, "talks all the time when you're in a conversation. It's a one-way street."

Despite having developed a warm relation with Reagan, whom Bush had served under as vice president, Thatcher never developed a similar sense of camaraderie with Bush. At the time that Bush took office in January 1989, having won the previous November's presidential election, Thatcher was politically under siege from both her political opposition and forces within her own party.

Bush was anxious to manage the collapse of communist regimes in Eastern Europe in a manner that would produce order and stability. Bush, therefore, used a 1989 trip to Brussels to demonstrate the heightened attention that his administration planned to allocate towards US–German relations. Thus, rather than giving Thatcher the precedence which prime ministers of the United Kingdom were accustomed to receiving from US presidents, he met with the president of the European Commission first, leaving Thatcher, "cooling her heels". This irritated Thatcher.

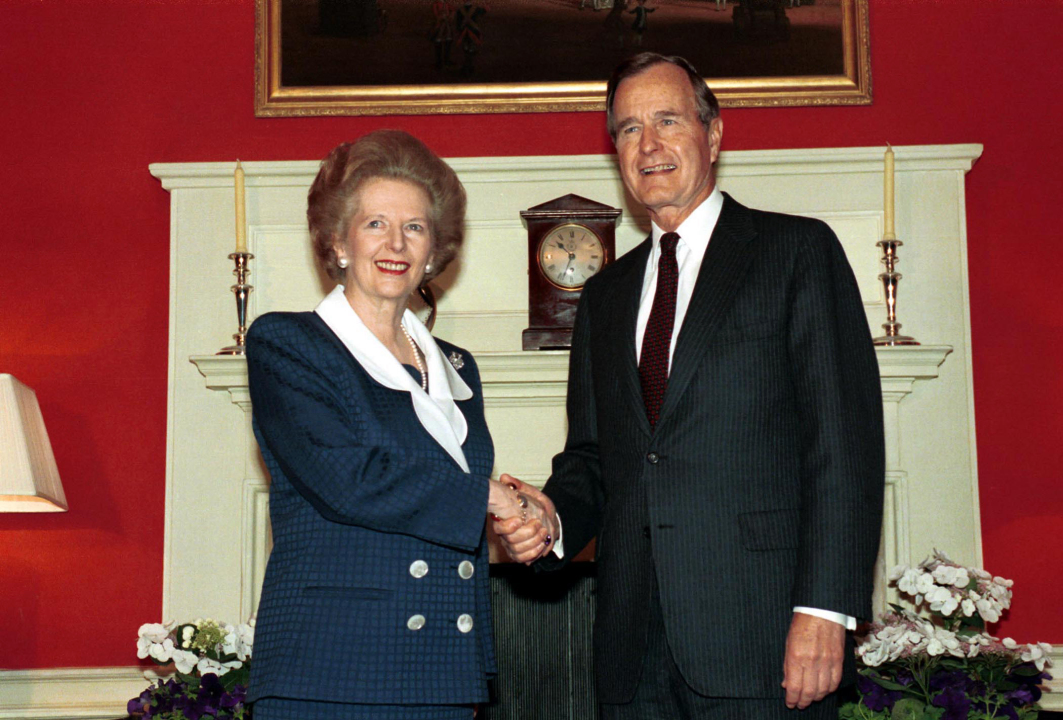
Prime Minister Margaret Thatcher and President George H. W. Bush in London, June 1989

In 1989, after Bush proposed a reduction in US troops stationed in Europe, Thatcher lectured Bush on the importance of freedom. Bush came out of this encounter asking, "Why does she have any doubt that we feel this way on this issue?"

In the midst of the invasion of Kuwait, Thatcher advised Bush that, "this is no time to go wobbly." Thatcher lost her premiership in November 1990. However, to Bush's displeasure, she continued attempting to involve herself in diplomacy between the West and the Soviet Union. Bush took particular offence to a speech Thatcher gave after leaving office in which she said that she and Ronald Reagan were responsible for ending the Cold War. Thatcher gave this speech, which snubbed the contributions that others had made, before an audience that included a number of individuals who had contributed to the ending the Cold War, such as Lech Wałęsa and Václav Havel. In reaction to this speech, Helmut Kohl sent Bush a note proclaiming that Thatcher was crazy.

=== Major and George H. W. Bush (November 1990 – January 1993) ===
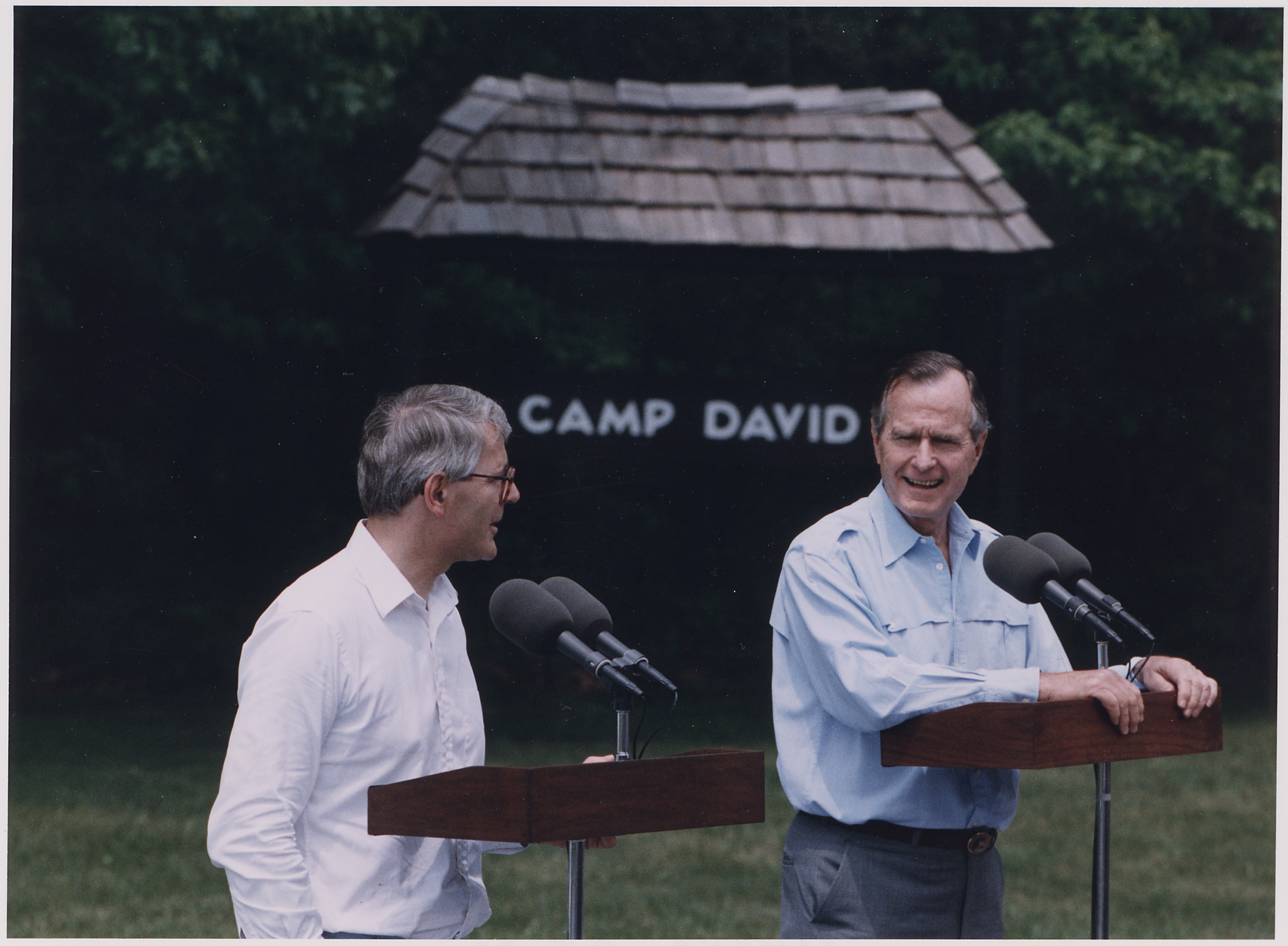
Prime Minister John Major (left) and President George H. W. Bush (right) at Camp David in June 1992

As had started becoming apparent in Thatcher's last few years of premiership, the Special Relationship had begun to wane for a time with the passing of the Cold War, despite intensive co-operation in the Gulf War. Thus, while it remained the case that, on nearly all issues, the United States and United Kingdom remained on the same side, to a degree greater than with their other close allies, it was also the case that, with the absence of the Soviet Union as a powerful shared threat, narrower disputes were able to arise with greater tensions than they previously would have merited.

=== Major and Clinton (January 1993 – May 1997) ===
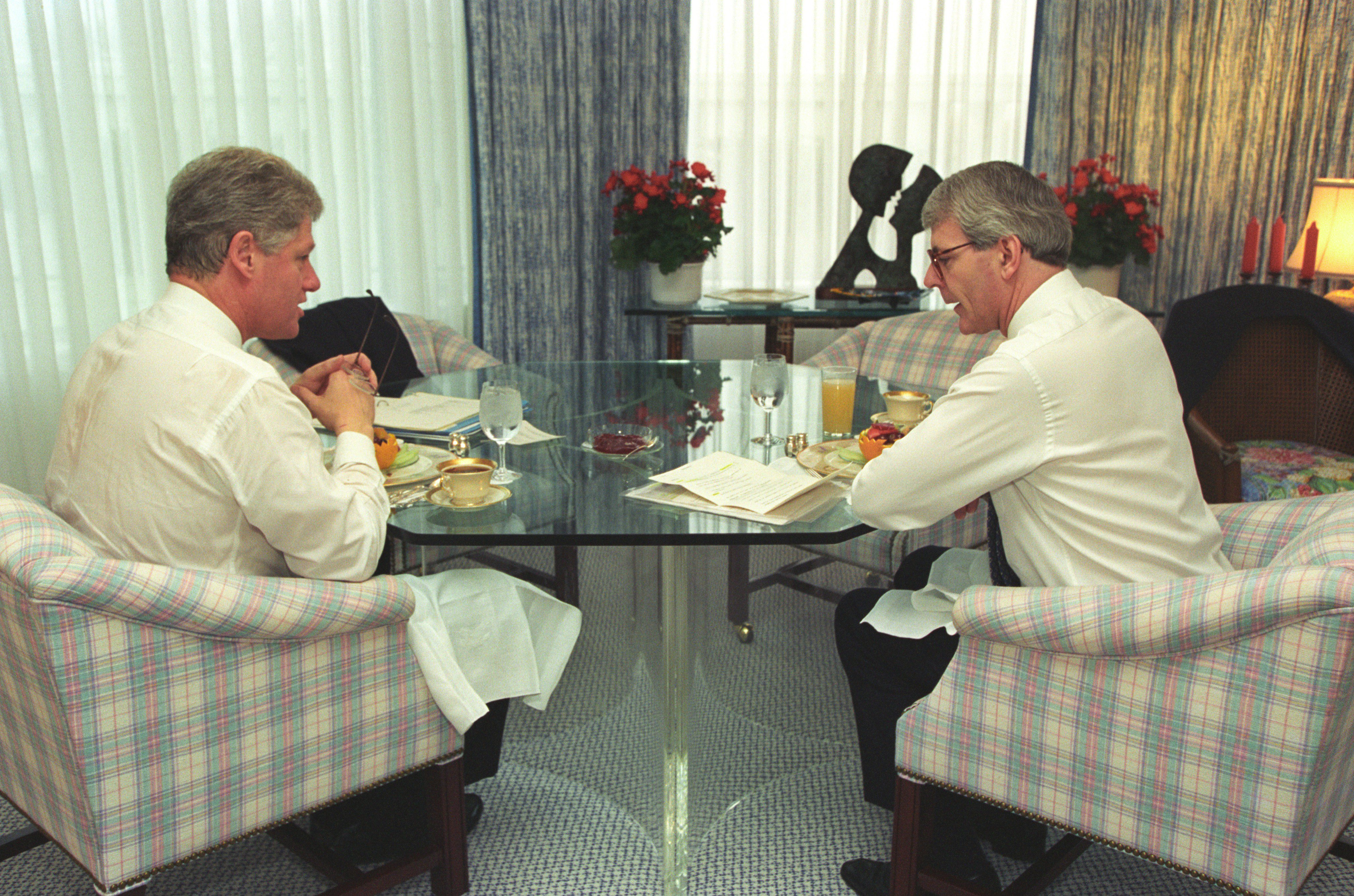
President Bill Clinton (left) and Prime Minister John Major (right) hold a working breakfast at the White House in March 1994.

Democratic president Bill Clinton intended to maintain the Special Relationship. But he and Major did not prove compatible. The nuclear alliance was weakened when Clinton extended a moratorium on tests in the Nevada desert in 1993, and pressed Major to agree to the Comprehensive Nuclear-Test-Ban Treaty. The freeze was described by a British defence minister as "unfortunate and misguided", as it inhibited validation of the "safety, reliability and effectiveness" of fail-safe mechanisms on upgraded warheads for the British Trident II D5 missiles, and potentially the development of a new deterrent for the 21st century, leading Major to consider a return to Pacific Ocean testing. The Ministry of Defence turned to computer simulation.

A genuine crisis in transatlantic relations blew up over Bosnia. London and Paris resisted relaxation of the UN arms embargo, and discouraged U.S. escalation, arguing that arming the Muslims or bombing the Serbs could worsen the bloodshed and endanger their peacekeepers on the ground. US secretary of state Warren Christopher's campaign to lift the embargo was rebuffed by Major and President Mitterrand in May 1993. After the so-called 'Copenhagen ambush' in June 1993, where Clinton "ganged up" with Chancellor Kohl to rally the European Community against the peacekeeping states, Major was said to be contemplating the death of the Special Relationship. The following month the United States voted at the UN with non-aligned countries against Britain and France over lifting the embargo.

By October 1993, Warren Christopher was bristling that Washington policy makers had been too "Eurocentric", and declared that Western Europe was "no longer the dominant area of the world". The U.S. ambassador to London, Raymond G.H. Seitz, demurred, insisting it was far too early to put a "tombstone" over the Special Relationship. A senior U.S. State Department official described Bosnia in the spring of 1995 as the worst crisis with the British and French since Suez. By the summer, U.S. officials were doubting whether NATO had a future.

The nadir had now been reached, and, along with NATO enlargement and the Croatian offensive in 1995 that opened the way for NATO bombing, the strengthening Clinton–Major relationship was later credited as one of three developments that saved the Western alliance. The president later acknowledged,

John Major carried a lot of water for me and for the alliance over Bosnia. I know he was under a lot of political pressure at home, but he never wavered. He was a truly decent guy who never let me down. We worked really well together, and I got to like him a lot.

A rift opened in a further area. In February 1994, Major refused to answer Clinton's telephone calls for days over his decision to grant Sinn Féin leader Gerry Adams a visa to visit the United States to agitate. Adams was listed as a terrorist by London. The U.S. State Department, the CIA, the U.S. Justice Department and the FBI all opposed the move on the grounds that it made the United States look "soft on terrorism" and "could do irreparable damage to the special relationship". Under pressure from Congress, the president hoped the visit would encourage the IRA to renounce violence. While Adams offered nothing new, and violence escalated within weeks, the president later claimed vindication after the IRA ceasefire of August 1994. To the disappointment of the prime minister, Clinton lifted the ban on official contacts and received Adams at the White House on St. Patrick's Day 1995, despite the fact the paramilitaries had not agreed to disarm. The rows over Northern Ireland and the Adams affair reportedly "provoked incandescent Clintonian rages".

In November 1995, Clinton became only the second US president ever to address both Houses of Parliament, but, by the end of Major's premiership, disenchantment with the Special Relationship had deepened to the point where the incoming British ambassador Christopher Meyer banned the "hackneyed phrase" from the embassy.

=== Blair and Clinton (May 1997 – January 2001) ===
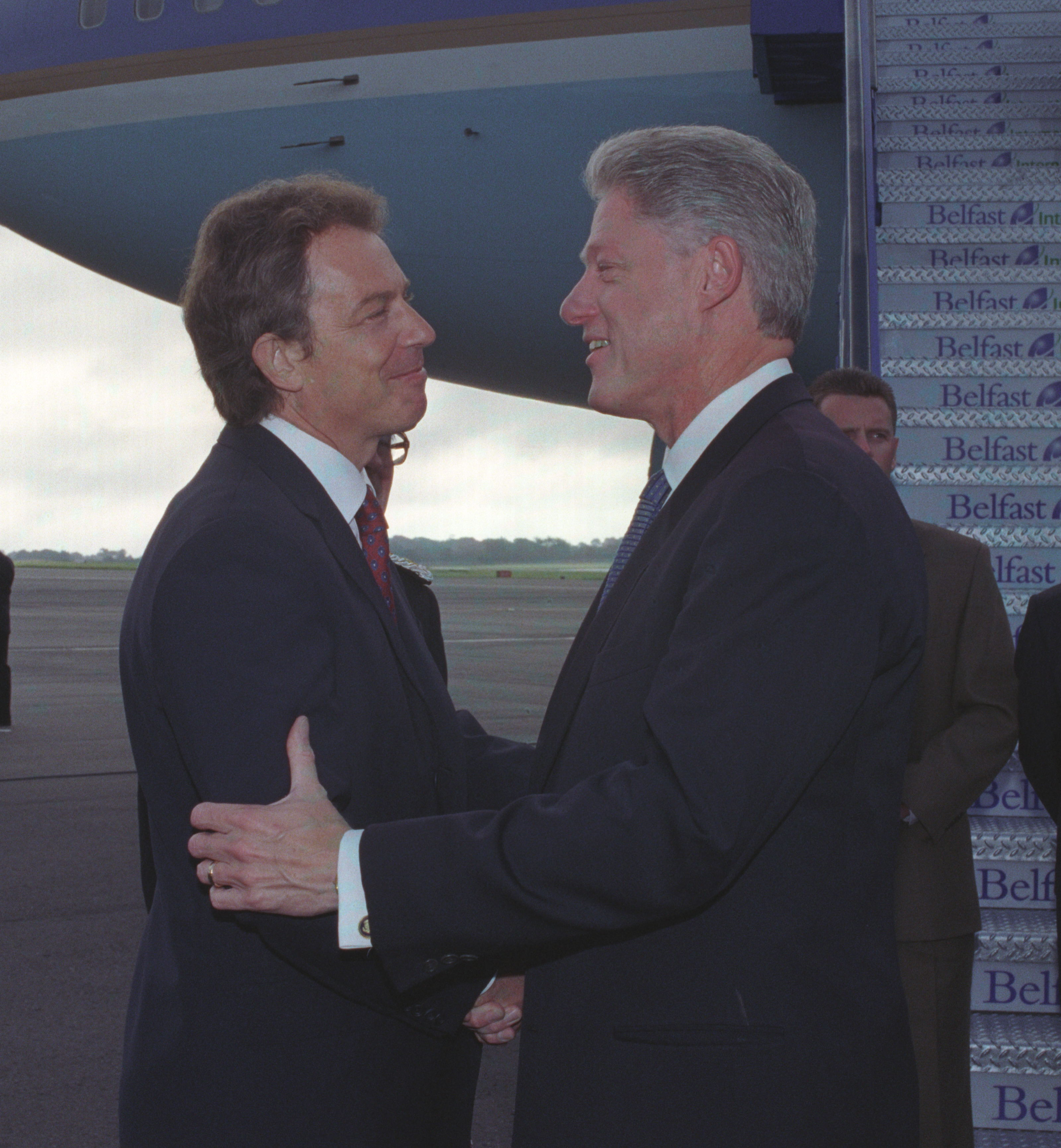
Prime Minister Tony Blair (left) and President Bill Clinton (right) in Belfast in September 1998

The election of British prime minister Tony Blair in 1997 brought an opportunity to revive what Clinton called the two nations' "unique partnership". At his first meeting with his new partner, the president said: "Over the last fifty years our unbreakable alliance has helped to bring unparalleled peace and prosperity and security. It's an alliance based on shared values and common aspirations."

The personal relationship between the two leaders was seen as especially close because the leaders were considered to be "kindred spirits" in their domestic agendas. Both Blair and Clinton had repositioned their political parties to embrace centrism, pushing their parties away from the left, a tactic each had adopted in response to successive national election losses that their parties had incurred prior their leadership. New Labour's third Way, a moderate social-democratic position, was partly influenced by United States New Democratic thinking that Clinton had helped to usher in.

Both Blair and Clinton were, each, the first of their generation (baby boomers) to lead their respective nation. Cooperation in defence and communications still had the potential to embarrass Blair, however, as he strove to balance it with his own leadership role in the European Union (EU). Enforcement of Iraqi no-fly zones and US bombing raids on Iraq dismayed EU partners. As the leading international proponent of humanitarian intervention, the "hawkish" Blair "bullied" Clinton to back diplomacy with force in Kosovo in 1999, pushing for deployment of ground troops to persuade the president "to do whatever was necessary" to win.

Clinton played a key role in the peace talks that led to the Good Friday Agreement between the governments of the United Kingdom and Ireland in 1998. The partnership between Blair and Clinton would later be the focus of the 2010 film The Special Relationship.

=== Blair and George W. Bush (January 2001 – June 2007) ===
Prime Minister Tony Blair (left) and President George W. Bush (right) in the East Room of the White House in November 2004, after a press conference

The personal diplomacy of Blair and Clinton's successor, US president George W. Bush in 2001, further served to highlight the Special Relationship. Despite their political differences on non-strategic matters, their shared beliefs and responses to the international situation formed a commonality of purpose following the September 11 attacks in New York and Washington, D.C. Blair, like Bush, was convinced of the importance of moving against the perceived threat to world peace and international order, famously pledging to stand "shoulder to shoulder" with Bush:

This is not a battle between the United States of America and terrorism, but between the free and democratic world and terrorism. We therefore here in Britain stand shoulder to shoulder with our American friends in this hour of tragedy, and we, like them, will not rest until this evil is driven from our world.

Blair flew to Washington immediately after 9/11 to affirm British solidarity with the United States. In a speech to the United States Congress, nine days after the attacks, Bush declared "America has no truer friend than Great Britain." Blair, one of the few world leaders to attend a presidential speech to Congress as a special guest of the First Lady, received two standing ovations from members of Congress. Blair's presence at the presidential speech remains the only time in U.S. political history that a foreign leader was in attendance at an emergency joint session of the U.S. Congress, a testimony to the strength of the U.S.–U.K. alliance under the two leaders. Following that speech, Blair embarked on two months of diplomacy, rallying international support for military action. The BBC calculated that, in total, the prime minister held 54 meetings with world leaders and travelled more than 40,000 miles (64,000 km).

Blair came to be considered Bush's strongest foreign ally in regards to the Iraq War. Blair's leadership role in the Iraq War helped him to sustain a strong relationship with Bush through to the end of his time as prime minister, but it was unpopular within his own party and lowered his public approval ratings. Some of the British press called Blair "Bush's poodle". It also alienated some of his European partners, including the leaders of France and Germany. Russian popular artist Mikhail Nikolayevich Zadornov mused that "the position adopted by Britain towards America in the context of the Iraq War would be officially introduced into Kama Sutra." Blair felt he could defend his close personal relationship with Bush by claiming it had brought progress in the Middle East peace process, aid for Africa and climate-change diplomacy. However, it was not with Bush but with California Governor Arnold Schwarzenegger that Blair ultimately succeeded in setting up a carbon-trading market, "creating a model other states will follow".

The 2006 Lebanon War also exposed some minor differences in attitudes over the Middle East. The strong support offered by Blair and the Bush administration to Israel was not wholeheartedly shared by the British cabinet or the British public. On 27 July, Foreign Secretary Margaret Beckett criticised the United States for "ignoring procedure" when using Prestwick Airport as a stop-off point for delivering laser-guided bombs to Israel.

=== Brown and George W. Bush (June 2007 – January 2009) ===
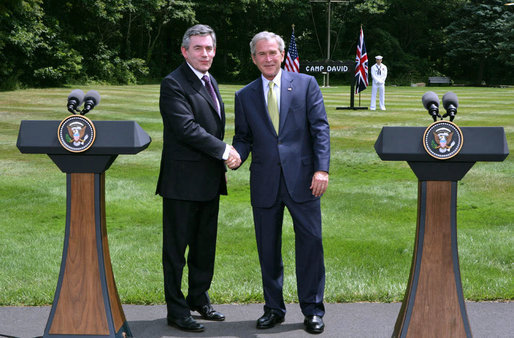
Prime Minister Gordon Brown (left) and President George W. Bush (right) at Camp David in July 2007

Although British prime minister Gordon Brown stated his support for the United States on assuming office in 2007, he appointed ministers to the Foreign Office who had been critical of aspects of the relationship or of recent US policy. A Whitehall source said: "It will be more businesslike now, with less emphasis on the meeting of personal visions you had with Bush and Blair." British policy was that the relationship with the United States remained the United Kingdom's "most important bilateral relationship".

=== Brown and Obama (January 2009 – May 2010) ===
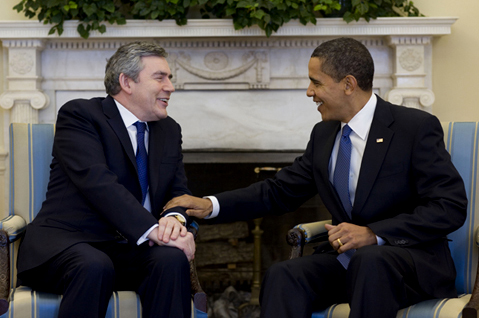
Prime Minister Gordon Brown (left) and President Barack Obama (right) in the Oval Office in March 2009

Prior to his election as US president in 2008, Barack Obama, suggesting that Blair and Britain had been let down by the Bush administration, declared: "We have a chance to recalibrate the relationship and for the United Kingdom to work with America as a full partner."

On meeting Brown as president for the first time in March 2009, Obama reaffirmed that "Great Britain is one of our closest and strongest allies and there is a link and bond there that will not break... This notion that somehow there is any lessening of that special relationship is misguided... The relationship is not only special and strong but will only get stronger as time goes on." Commentators, however, noted that the recurring use of "special partnership" by White House Press Secretary Robert Gibbs could be signaling an effort to recast terms.

The Special Relationship was also reported to be "strained" after a senior U.S. State Department official criticised a British decision to talk to the political wing of Hezbollah, complaining that the United States had not been properly informed. The protest came after the Obama administration had said it was prepared to talk to Hamas and at the same time as it was making overtures to Syria and Iran. A senior Foreign Office official responded: "This should not have come as a shock to any official who might have been in the previous administration and is now in the current one."

In June 2009 the special relationship was reported to have "taken another hit" after the British government was said to be "angry" over the failure of the US to seek its approval before negotiating with Bermuda over the resettlement to the British overseas territory of four ex-Guantanamo Bay inmates wanted by the People's Republic of China. A Foreign Office spokesman said: 'It's something that we should have been consulted about.' Asked whether the men might be sent back to Cuba, he replied: "We are looking into all possible next steps." The move prompted an urgent security assessment by the British government. Shadow Foreign Secretary William Hague demanded an explanation from the incumbent, David Miliband, as comparisons were drawn with his previous embarrassment over the US use of Diego Garcia for extraordinary rendition without British knowledge, with one commentator describing the affair as "a wake-up call" and "the latest example of American governments ignoring Britain when it comes to US interests in British territories abroad".

In August 2009, the Special Relationship was again reported to have "taken another blow" with the release on compassionate grounds of Abdelbaset al-Megrahi, the man convicted of the 1988 Lockerbie Bombing. U.S. secretary of state Hillary Clinton said "it was absolutely wrong to release Abdelbaset al-Megrahi", adding "We are still encouraging the Scottish authorities not to do so and hope they will not". Obama also commented that the release of al-Megrahi was a "mistake" and "highly objectionable".

In March 2010, Hillary Clinton's support for Argentina's call for negotiations over the Falkland Islands triggered a series of diplomatic protests from Britain and renewed public scepticism about the value of the Special Relationship. The British government rejected Clinton's offer of mediation after renewed tensions with Argentina were triggered by a British decision to drill for oil near the Falkland Islands. The British government's long-standing position was that the Falklands were British territory, with all that this implied regarding the legitimacy of British commercial activities within its boundaries. British officials were therefore irritated by the implication that sovereignty was negotiable.

Later that month, the Foreign Affairs Select Committee of the House of Commons suggested that the British government should be "less deferential" towards the United States and focus relations more on British interests. According to Committee Chair Mike Gapes, "The UK and US have a close and valuable relationship not only in terms of intelligence and security but also in terms of our profound and historic cultural and trading links and commitment to freedom, democracy and the rule of law. But the use of the phrase 'the special relationship' in its historical sense, to describe the totality of the ever-evolving UK–US relationship, is potentially misleading, and we recommend that its use should be avoided." In April 2010, the Church of England added its voice to the call for a more balanced relationship between Britain and the United States.

=== Cameron and Obama (May 2010 – July 2016) ===
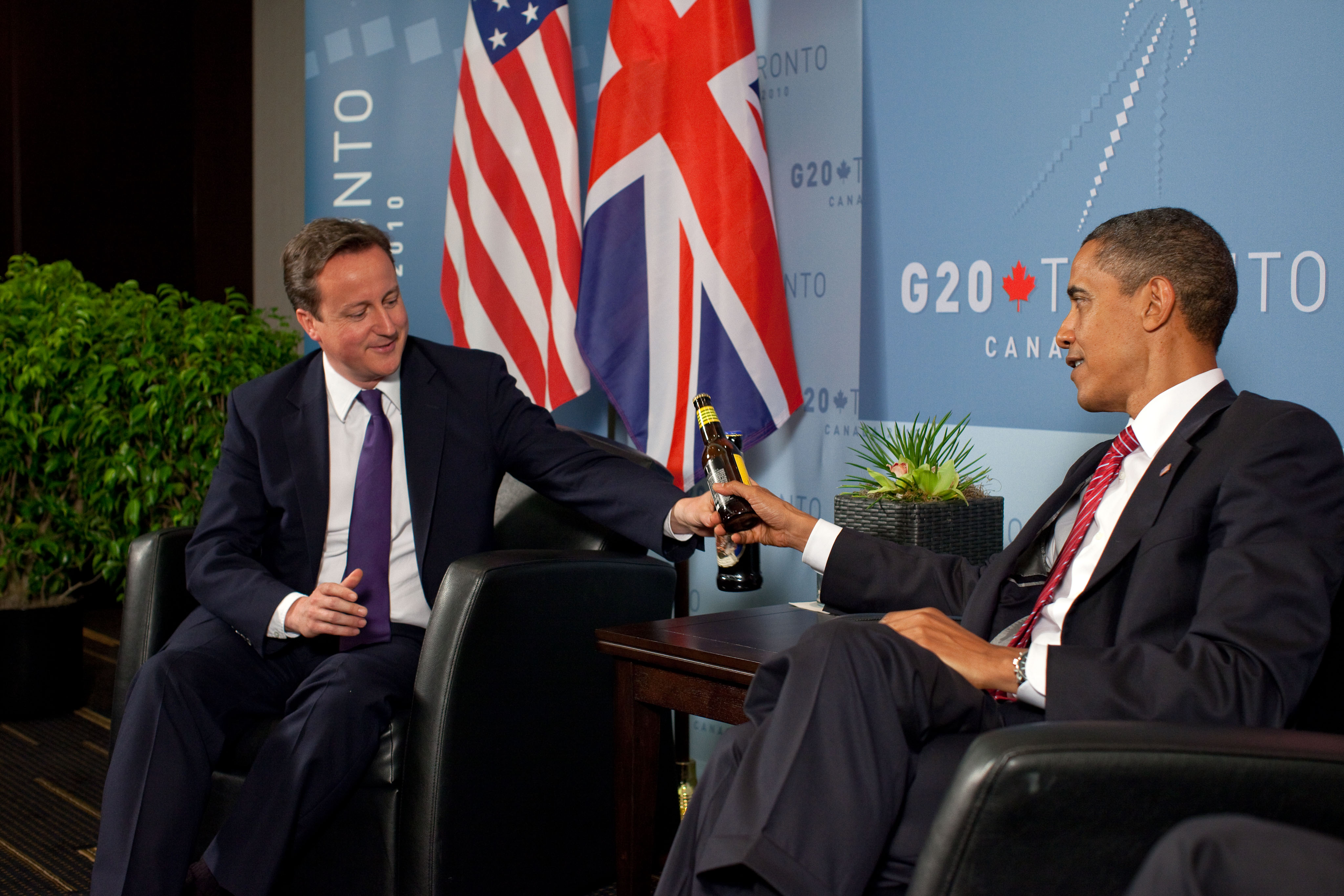
Prime Minister David Cameron (left) and President Barack Obama (right) at the G20 Summit in Toronto, Canada, June 2010.

On David Cameron's being appointed as Prime Minister of the United Kingdom after coalition talks between his Conservatives and the Liberal Democrats concluded on 11 May 2010, President Obama was the first foreign leader to offer his congratulations. Following the conversation Obama said:

As I told the prime minister, the United States has no closer friend and ally than the United Kingdom, and I reiterated my deep and personal commitment to the special relationship between our two countries – a bond that has endured for generations and across party lines.

Foreign Secretary William Hague responded to the president's overture by making Washington his first port of call, commenting: "We're very happy to accept that description and to agree with that description. The United States is without doubt the most important ally of the United Kingdom." Meeting Hillary Clinton, Hague hailed the Special Relationship as "an unbreakable alliance", and added: "It's not a backward-looking or nostalgic relationship. It is one looking to the future from combating violent extremism to addressing poverty and conflict around the world." Both governments confirmed their joint commitment to the war in Afghanistan and their opposition to the nuclear program of Iran.

The Deepwater Horizon oil spill in 2010 sparked a media firestorm against BP in the United States. The Christian Science Monitor observed that a "rhetorical prickliness" had come about from escalating Obama administration criticism of BP—straining the Special Relationship—particularly the repeated use of the term "British Petroleum" even though the business no longer uses that name. Cameron stated that he did not want to make the president's toughness on BP a U.S.–U.K. issue, and noted that the company was balanced in terms of the number of its American and British shareholders. The validity of the Special Relationship was put in question as a result of the "aggressive rhetoric".

On 20 July, Cameron met with Obama during his first visit to the United States as prime minister. The two expressed unity in a wide range of issues, including the war in Afghanistan. During the meeting, Obama stated, "We can never say it enough. The United States and the United Kingdom enjoy a truly special relationship," then going on to say, "We celebrate a common heritage. We cherish common values. ... (And) above all, our alliance thrives because it advances our common interests." Cameron said, "from the times I've met Barack Obama before, we do have very, very close – allegiances and very close positions on all the key issues, whether that is Afghanistan or Middle East peace process or Iran. Our interests are aligned and we've got to make this partnership work." During the meeting, both Cameron and Obama criticized the decision of the Scottish Government to release Abdelbaset al-Megrahi, who was convicted of participating in the Lockerbie bombing, from prison.

In May, Obama became the second U.S. president to make a state visit to the U.K. and the third U.S. president (after Ronald Reagan and Bill Clinton) to address both Houses of Parliament. (George W. Bush was invited to address Parliament in 2003, but declined.) He was the first US president to give a rare Westminster Hall address, in which he stressed themes of shared heritage and values, as well as multilateralism.

In 2013, ahead of a UK Parliament vote against participating in U.S. military action in Syria, Secretary of State John Kerry remarked "The relationship between the US and UK has often been described as special or essential and it has been described thus simply because it is." Foreign Secretary William Hague replied: "So the United Kingdom will continue to work closely with the United States, taking a highly active role in addressing the Syria crisis and working with our closest ally over the coming weeks and months." In July 2015, after negotiations, the United Kingdom and the United States, along with China, France, the European Union, Germany, Russia agreed to the Joint Comprehensive Plan of Action with Iran.

In 2015, Cameron stated that Obama calls him "bro" and described the "special relationship" between Washington and Westminster as "stronger than it has ever been". In March 2016, Obama criticised the British PM for becoming "distracted" over the intervention in Libya, a criticism that was also aimed at the French president. A National Security Council spokesman sent an unsolicited email to the BBC limiting the damage done by stating that "Prime Minister David Cameron has been as close a partner as the president has had."

=== May and Obama (July 2016 – January 2017) ===
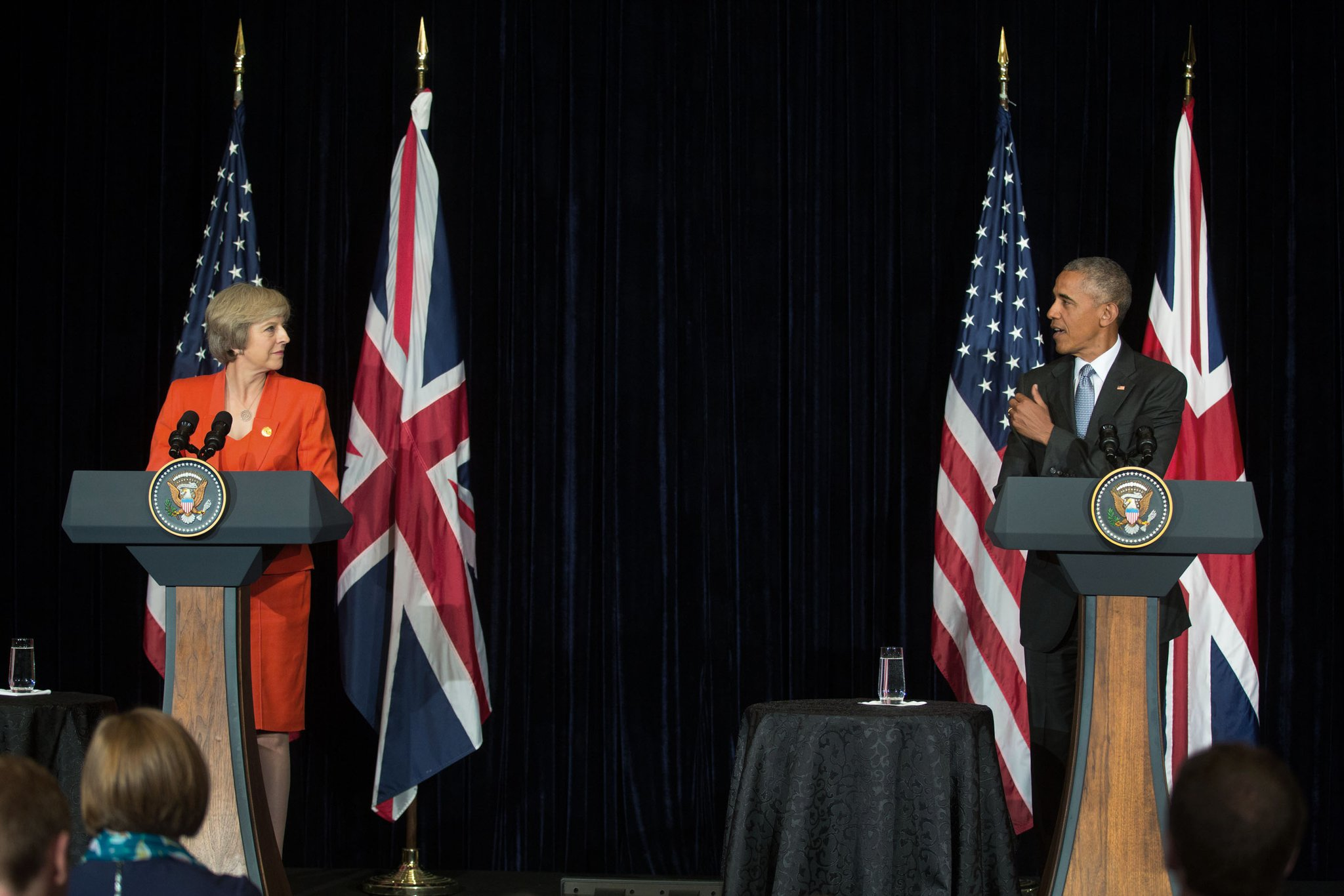
Prime Minister Theresa May (left) and President Barack Obama (right) deliver a joint press statement at the G20 Summit in Hangzhou, China, September 2016.

The short period of relations between post-Brexit referendum newly appointed Theresa May and Obama administration was met with diplomatic tension over John Kerry's criticism of Israel in a speech. Obama maintained his stance that the UK would be a low priority for US trade talks post-Brexit, and that the UK would be at "the back of the queue".

May chose Boris Johnson to serve as her Foreign Secretary. Johnson had written an op-ed which made mention of Obama's Kenyan heritage in a manner which critics accused of being racist. He had also previously written an op-ed about Hillary Clinton which made derisive statements that had been criticized as sexist. By the time May appointed Johnson, Clinton was the Democratic Party's presumptive nominee in the election to elect Obama's successor, and thus had a significant chance of being the next US president. A senior official in the US government suggested that Johnson's appointment would push the US further towards ties with Germany at the expense of the Special Relationship with the UK.

Ultimately, before he left office, Obama stated that German chancellor Angela Merkel had been his "closest international partner" throughout his tenure as president. While Obama might have had a distant relationship with Prime Minister May, he reportedly maintained a strong cordial relationship with members of the British royal family.

=== May and Trump (January 2017 – July 2019) ===
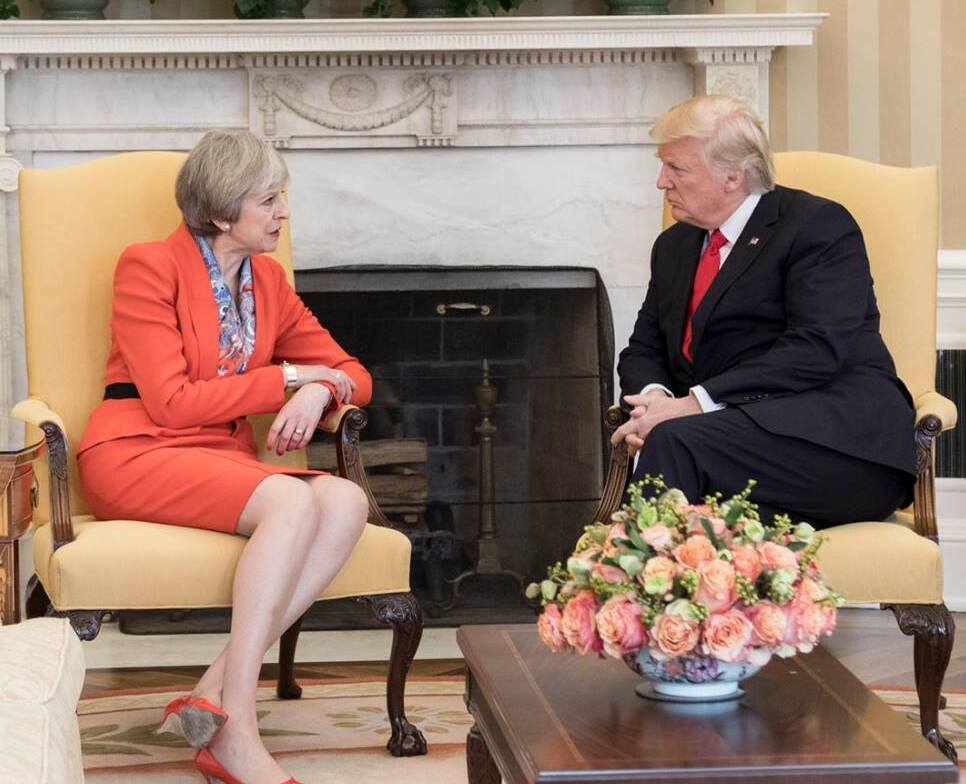
Prime Minister Theresa May (left) and President Donald Trump (right) in the Oval Office, January 2017.

Following the election of Donald Trump, the British government sought to establish a close alliance with the Trump administration. May's efforts to closely associate herself with Trump proved to be strongly controversial in the United Kingdom. May was the first world leader to meet with Trump following his inauguration. May's supporters described her visit as a bid to reaffirm the historical "special relationship" between the two countries. The meeting took place at the White House and lasted about an hour.

May was criticized in the UK by members of all major parties, including her own, for refusing to condemn Trump's "Muslim ban" executive order. as well as for her invitation to Trump, extended in 2017, for a state visit with Queen Elizabeth II. An invitation for a state visit had not traditionally been extended so early in a presidency, however May did so in hopes of fostering a stronger trade relationship with the United States before the Brexit deadline. More than 1.8 million signed an official parliamentary e-petition which said that "Donald Trump's well documented misogyny and vulgarity disqualifies him from being received by Her Majesty the Queen or the Prince of Wales," and Jeremy Corbyn, the Leader of the Opposition Labour Party, said in Prime Minister's Questions that Trump should not be welcomed to Britain "while he abuses our shared values with his shameful Muslim ban and attacks on refugees' and women's rights" and said that Trump should be banned from the UK until his travel ban is lifted. Baroness Warsi, former chair of the Conservatives, accused May of "bowing down" to Trump, who she described as "a man who has no respect for women, disdain for minorities, little value for LGBT communities, no compassion clearly for the vulnerable and whose policies are rooted in divisive rhetoric." London Mayor Sadiq Khan and the Conservative leader in Scotland, Ruth Davidson, also called for the visit to be cancelled. Trump's invitation was later downgraded to a "working visit" rather than a "state visit"; the visit occurred in July 2018 and included a meeting with the queen, but not the ceremonies and events of a full state visit.

Despite May's efforts to establish a beneficial working relationship with Trump, their relationship had been described as "dysfunctional". It had been reported that, in their phone calls, Trump had made a habit of interrupting May.

In November 2017, Trump retweeted an anti-Muslim post from the far-right group Britain First. The move was condemned across the British political spectrum, and May said through a spokesperson that it was "wrong of the president to have done this." In response, Trump tweeted, "Don't focus on me, focus on the destructive Radical Islamic Terrorism that is taking place within the United Kingdom, We are doing just fine!" The dispute between Trump and May weakened the perception of a strong "special relationship" under May's leadership and undermined her efforts to craft an image of a close relationship with the United States in order to ease the passage of Brexit. Some viewed Trump's tweets as causing significant harm to the Special Relationship.

In February 2018, Trump—in an attempt to rebuke a push by some in the U.S. Democratic Party for universal healthcare—tweeted that, "thousands of people are marching in the UK because their U system is going broke and not working". Trump's criticism of the UK's National Health Service (NHS) was factually inaccurate; the protests in the UK that Trump referenced actually pushed for an improvement in NHS services and increases in funding, and were not in opposition to the NHS or to Britain's universal healthcare system. The tweet furthered strained the Trump-May relationship, and May responded by declaring her pride in the UK's health system.

In January 2018, in a televised interview with Piers Morgan, Trump criticized May's approach to Brexit negotiations, furthering straining his relationship with her. At the 2018 G7 summit, Trump repeatedly made apparent slights towards May. Despite this, May stated that her relationship with Trump remained strong. At the 2018 Brussels summit, May sought to curry favor with Trump by supporting his complaints that other NATO members had failed to meet certain levels of defence funding.

Following the Brussels summit, Trump made his first presidential visit to the United Kingdom. His visit came at period in the United Kingdom's political climate which had been preceded by significant tumult for May. She was receiving significant resistance to her plans for a "soft Brexit", which had resulted several major resignations amongst her cabinet ministers. During his visit, in an interview with The Sun, Trump, again, spoke critically of May's handling of Brexit negotiations. He stated that May's proposal would likely kill the prospects of a US-UK trade agreement. These comments inflicted further damage on an already-embattled May. Trump also praised Boris Johnson (a political rival of May's who had recently resigned from her cabinet), going as far to suggest that Johnson would make a good prime minister. Vanity Fair considered that the "special relationship" had "devolved into a greasy dumpster fire" under May and Trump.

Relations between the United Kingdom and the Trump administration were further strained in 2019, after a number of confidential diplomatic cables authored by the British ambassador to the United States, Kim Darroch, were leaked to the Mail on Sunday. In the cables to the Foreign Office, which dated from 2017 to 2019, Darroch reported that the Trump administration as "uniquely dysfunctional" and "inept" and that Trump "radiates insecurity"; the cables advised U.S. officials that dealing with Trump required them "you need to make your points simple, even blunt." Darroch also wrote that Trump's position toward Iran frequently changed, likely to political considerations. After the memos leaked, Trump said that Darroch "has not served the UK well" and criticizing May. May defended Darroch, stating that "Good government depends on public servants being able to give full and frank advice"; other British politicians, such as Nigel Farage and Liam Fox, criticized Darroch. Following Boris Johnson's refusal to defend Darroch in a debate for the 2019 Conservative Party leadership election and Trump's statement that he would refuse to deal with Darroch, the ambassador resigned. Both May and Corbyn praised Darroch's service in the House of Commons and deplored that he had to resign under pressure from the United States.

=== Johnson and Trump (July 2019 – January 2021) ===
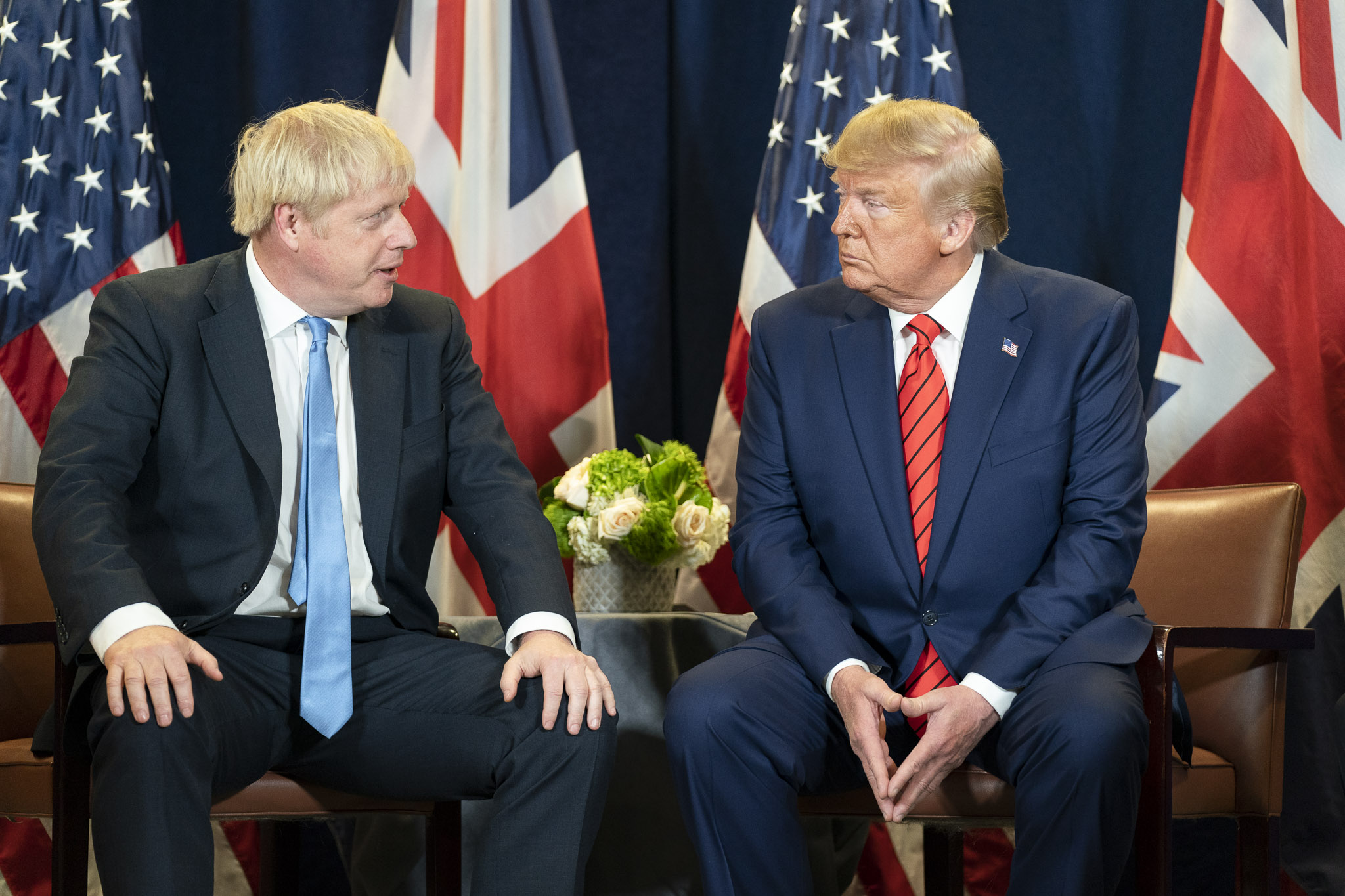
Prime Minister Boris Johnson (left) and President Donald Trump (right) in New York City, September 2019.

After May resigned, Boris Johnson won the leadership contest with Trump's endorsement, and became prime minister. Trump praised Johnson as prime minister and celebrated comparisons that had been made between Johnson and himself, declaring, "Good man. He's tough and he's smart. They're saying 'Britain Trump.' They call him 'Britain Trump', and there's people saying that's a good thing." Johnson, had, in fact, been called the "British Trump" by some analysts and critics. However, Boris Johnson greatly differs in social policy, and is more socially liberal. Before and after becoming prime minister, Johnson spoke complimentarily of Trump.

At the start of November, as the UK prepared for the start of its 2019 general election campaign, Trump threw his support behind Johnson and the Conservative Party, telling London radio station LBC that a government led by opposition leader Jeremy Corbyn and his Labour Party would be "so bad for your country ... he'd take you into such bad places." In the same interview, Trump praised Johnson as, "a fantastic man", and, "the exact right guy for the times". During the election campaign, Johnson had been seen as being keen on distancing himself from Trump, who was described as "deeply unpopular in the UK", with polls conducted during his presidency showing that citizens of the United Kingdom have low confidence in and approval of Trump.

Trump and Johnson, both regarded to be populists, were seen as having an overall warm relationship with one another. Analysts saw the two leaders as having some stylistic similarities. Johnson was seen as making a deliberate effort to ingratiate himself to Trump. Politico would later report, quoting a former White House official, that, before becoming prime minister, Johnson had actively worked to win Trump's favor while serving as foreign minister by winning over some of the president's top aides, particularly Stephen Miller. The former White House official alleged that Johnson even held a surreptitious private meetings with Miller during a trip to Washington, D.C. Politico also reported that Johnson and Trump would come to be on such close terms that Trump supplied Johnson with his personal cell phone number. Johnson and Trump shared a mutual desire to see the United Kingdom undertake a hasty Brexit. Trump had previously been critical of May's approach to Brexit, viewing it as overly prolonged and cautious.

At the NATO summit in London in December 2019, Johnson was caught on-camera appearing to participate in mocking Trump in a conversation with French president Emmanuel Macron, Dutch prime minister Mark Rutte, Canadian prime minister Justin Trudeau and Anne, Princess Royal. After the video was publicized, Trump criticized Trudeau as "two-faced" but did not criticize Johnson or other leaders.

After Trump's defeat by Joe Biden in the 2020 United States presidential election, Ben Wallace the United Kingdom's Secretary of State for Defence, said he would miss Donald Trump, calling him a good friend to Britain. After the January 6 United States Capitol attack, merely fourteen days before Trump was scheduled to leave office, Johnson publicly condemned Trump's actions in relation to the event, faulting him with having encouraged the attack's participants.

=== Johnson and Biden (January 2021 – September 2022) ===
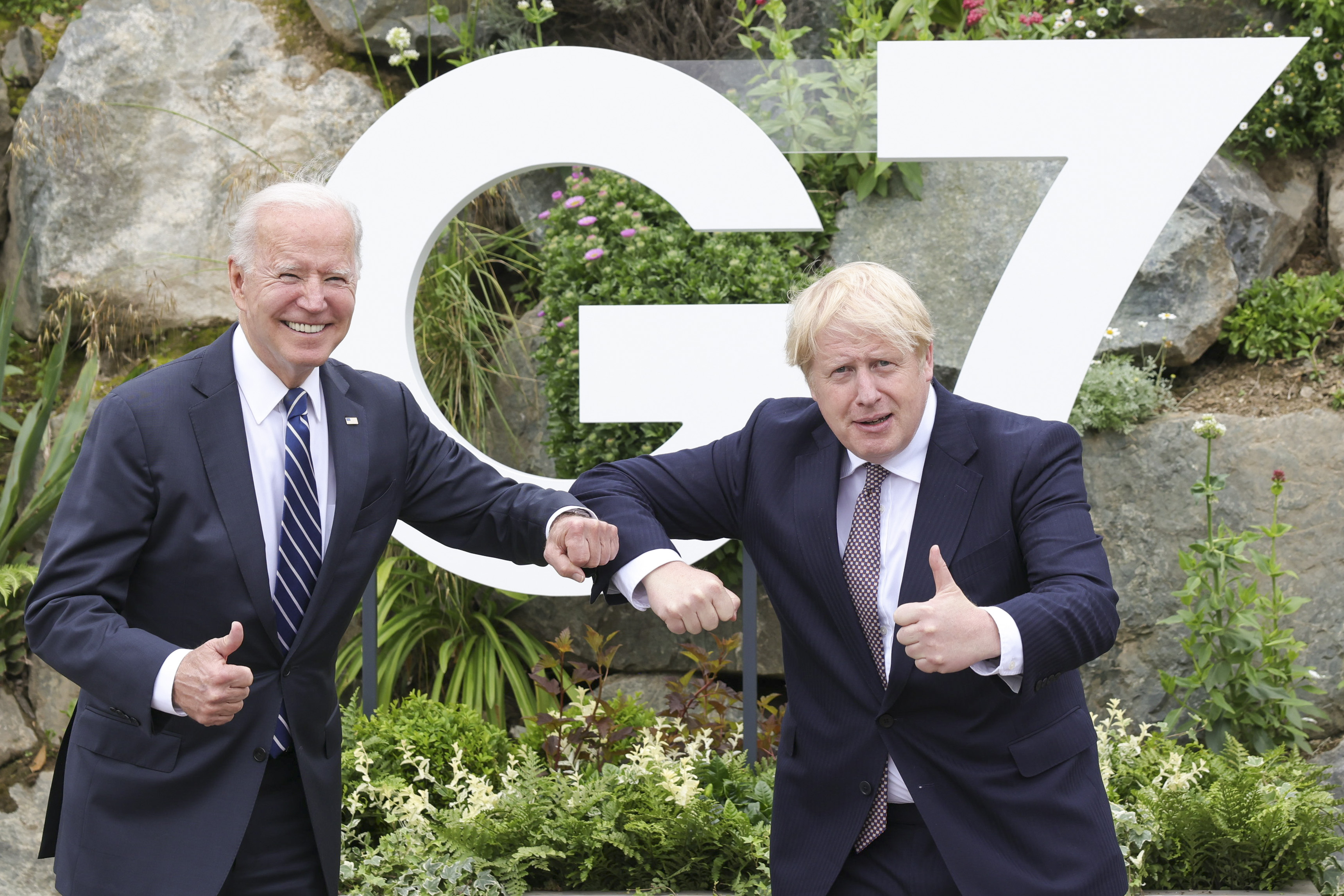
President Joe Biden (right) and Prime Minister Boris Johnson greet each other while attending the 47th G7 summit hosted by the UK in Cornwall. They exchange a social distanced greeting, as opposed to a handshake due to the COVID-19 pandemic.

Trump lost the 2020 United States presidential election. After Democrat Joe Biden was projected the victor of the election on 7 November, Johnson released a statement congratulating him. Johnson indicated that he was anticipating working with Biden on shared priorities, such as climate change, trade security, and declared his belief that the United States was the United Kingdom's most important ally. During his presidential campaign, Biden and his team reportedly did not communicate with United Kingdom officials, as they opted to avoid speaking with foreign officials in order to avoid accusations of collusion with foreign powers in case any nation engaged in foreign electoral intervention in the United States elections. On 10 November, Johnson exchanged a congratulatory phone call with Biden.

==== Analysis of compatibility ====
Biden has been regarded as to having a less compatible personality to Johnson than Trump had. Dan Balz, noting that Johnson and Biden have different leadership styles, a generational gap in age, and that their respective political parties occupy different positions on the political spectrum, has opined that the two, "are anything but natural soul mates".

After Biden was elected, there was some speculation that Biden would have a less friendly personal relationship with Johnson than Trump did. Analysts believed that Trump had more similarities to Johnson than Biden does. After Biden won, Business Insider reported that sources from Biden's campaign had told the outlet that Biden held hostility towards Johnson, believing him to be a right-wing populist who is similar to Trump. In December 2019, Biden had publicly derided Johnson as a, "kind of physical and emotional clone" of Donald Trump. History related to the two leaders was cited in reports of their likely hostility. During his tenure as vice president in the Obama administration, Biden had concurred with Obama in standing in opposition to a Brexit, while Johnson was a key advocate for it. Biden is a firm supporter of maintaining the Good Friday Agreement, while Johnson had, at times, been characterized as treating as an impediment to implementing Brexit. Johnson's past comments about Biden's friend, political ally, and former boss Barack Obama were regarded as a source of potential animosity for Biden. Johnson's derisive comments on Biden's former colleague, and fellow Democrat, Hillary Clinton were also regarded as a potential source of animosity for Biden. The degree to which Johnson embraced Trump was also speculated to be a point of bother that Biden may hold. There were further reports that Johnson was viewed even more negatively by vice president-elect Kamala Harris, and that members of the Biden–Harris team did not consider Johnson to be an ally and had ruled out the possibility of a special relationship with him. Ahead of Biden's inauguration, analysts speculated that Johnson's priority for a post-Brexit free trade deal between the two nations would not be treated as a priority by Biden. However, some analysts speculated that the two could reach common ground on prioritizing actions to combat climate change.

While analysts generally believe Johnson to have had more political similarities to Trump than to Biden, there are several policy matters where Johnson and his Conservative Party have more common ground with Biden and his Democratic Party than Trump and his Republican Party. For example, the United Kingdom continues to support the Joint Comprehensive Plan of Action both nations had entered with Iran and other nations under the Cameron-Obama period, while Trump withdrew the United States from it. As president, Biden has sought to have the United States rejoin the agreement. Johnson and the Conservative Party have expressed concern over climate change, as have Biden and his Democratic Party, while Trump and his Republican Party have been sceptical towards it. On his first day as president, Biden initiated the readmittance of the United States to the Paris Agreement, which Trump had withdrawn the United States from during his presidency. Johnson praised Biden for this. Trump is critical of NATO, and, as president, had levied the threat of withdrawing the United States from it due to his belief that some member nations were not contributing enough to the organization financially. Biden and Johnson, contrarily, have shared a mutual appreciation of the organization, expressing their belief of it to be a critical component of both nations' collective defense.

==== Interactions ====
Biden took office on January 20, 2021. It was reported by The Telegraph that Johnson was the first European leader that Biden made a phone call to after being inaugurated as president. In the first days of his presidency, Biden's administration expressed that the president desired to work closely with Johnson, looking to the 2021 G7 Summit and the 2021 United Nations Climate Change Conference as opportunities for collaboration between the two leaders.

Biden's first overseas trip and first face-to-face meeting with Johnson was at the 2021 G7 Summit, hosted in Cornwall, England in June. Johnson described Biden as a "breath of fresh air", stating "there's so much that [the US] want to do together" with us. The first meeting between the two leaders included plans to re-establish travel links between the US and UK, which had been banned by the US since the start of the pandemic and to agree a deal (to be called the new Atlantic charter), which commits the countries to working together on "the key challenges of this century - cyber security, emerging technologies, global health and climate change". President Biden explicitly "affirmed the special relationship". That charter encompass democracy and human rights of all individuals, rules-based international order and fair trade, territorial integrity and freedom of navigation, protect innovative edge and new markets/standards, terrorism, rules-based global economy, climate crisis and health systems and health protection. Also in their talks, both leaders affirmed a commitment to maintaining the Good Friday Agreement, a matter which Biden is personally greatly concerned about. After their first meeting, both Johnson and Biden characterized their interaction as having affirmed the "special relationship".

=== Truss and Biden (September 2022 – October 2022) ===
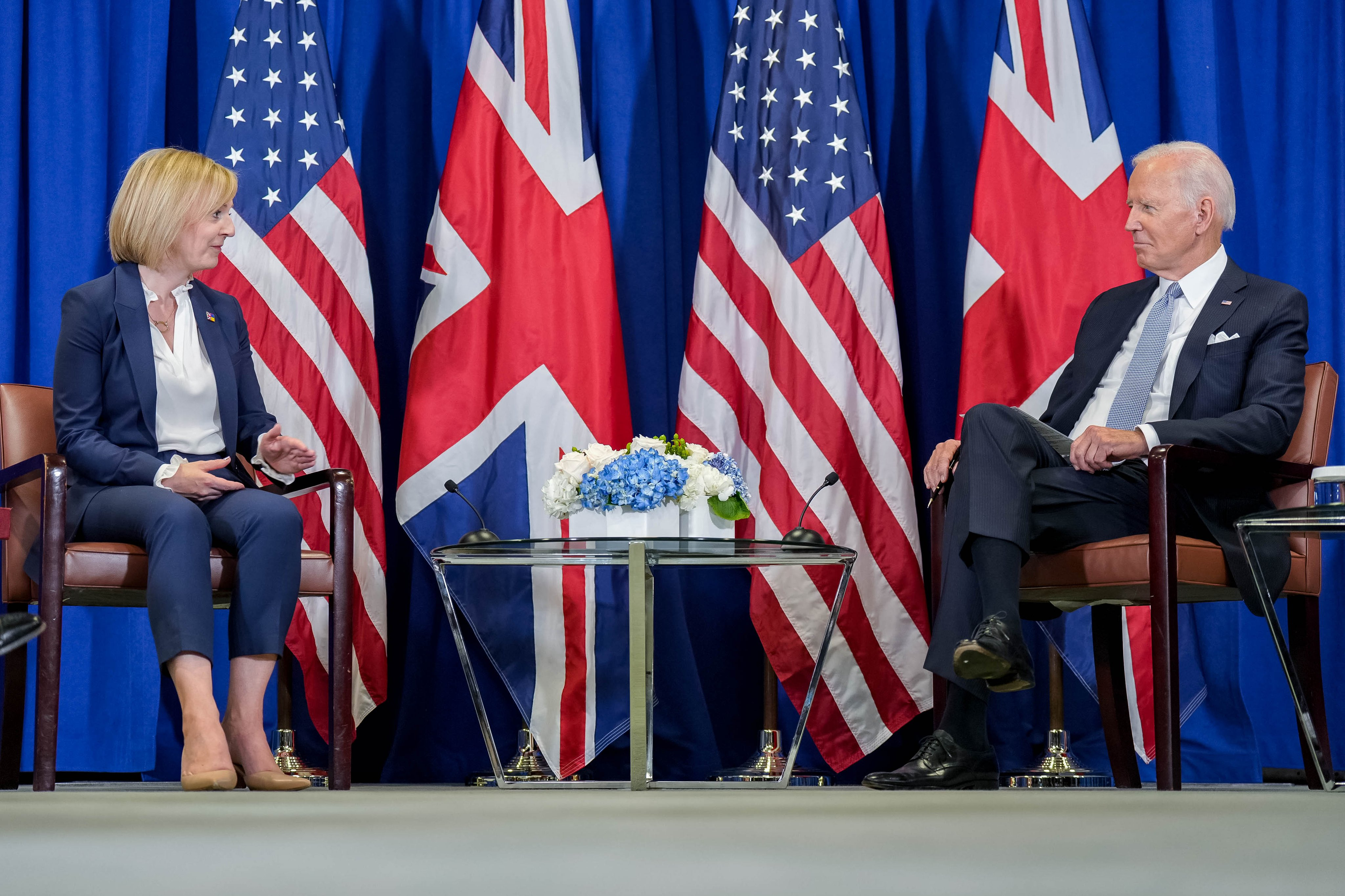
Prime Minister Liz Truss (left) and President Joe Biden (right) in New York City, September 2022.

Liz Truss became Prime Minister of the United Kingdom on 6 September 2022. President Biden said in a congratulatory tweet that he looked forward to "deepening the special relationship" between the US and the UK, and reinstating their commitment to support Ukraine. In a break from tradition, Truss's first phone call as prime minister did not go to the White House, instead choosing to speak to Ukrainian president Volodymyr Zelenskyy before calling Biden later that evening.

=== Sunak and Biden (October 2022 – July 2024) ===
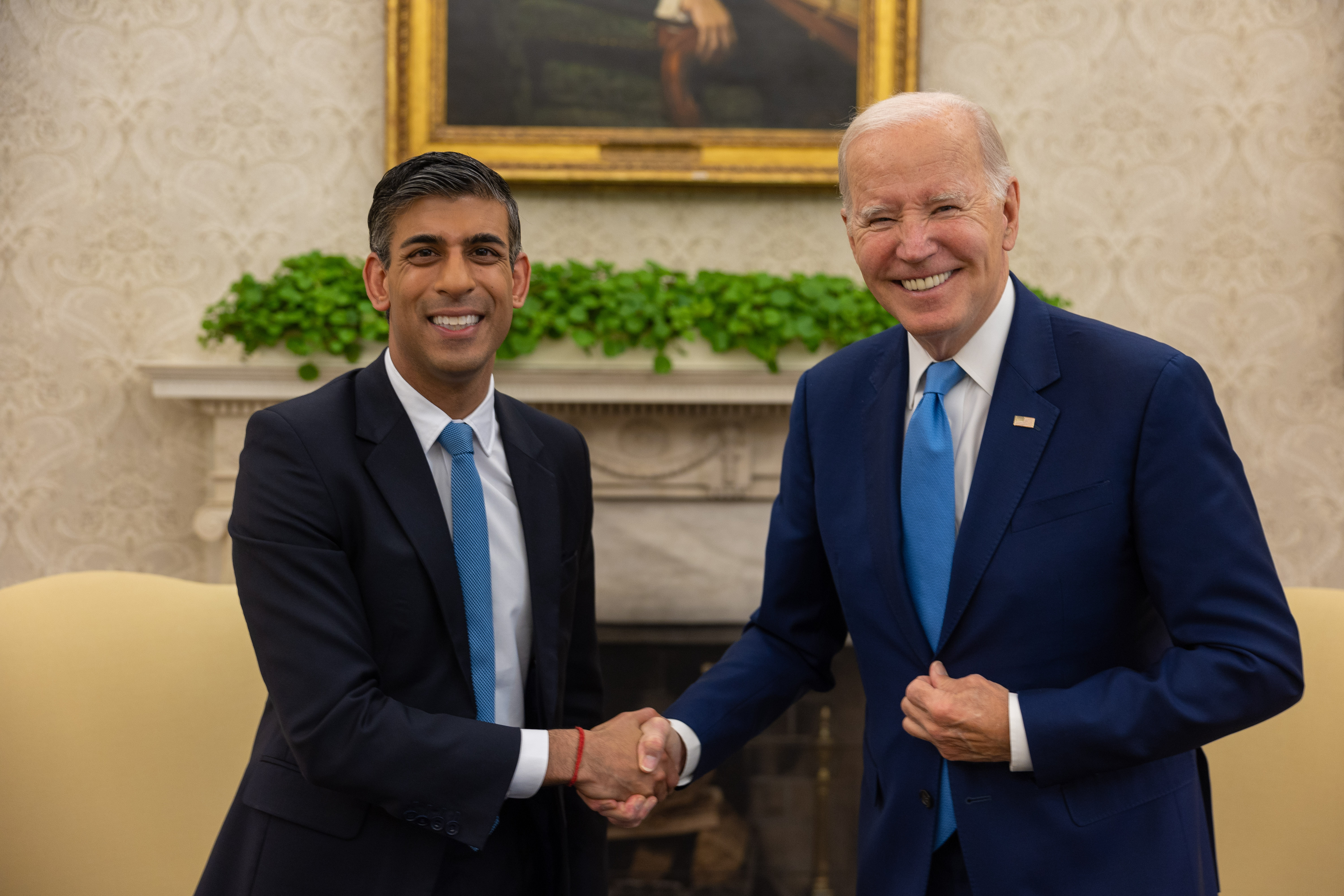
Prime Minister Rishi Sunak (left) and President Joe Biden (right) in the Oval Office, June 2023.

Rishi Sunak became Prime Minister of the United Kingdom on 25 October 2022. That day, President Biden called him to congratulate him on his appointment, as well as both agreeing to support Ukraine and maintaining the Good Friday Agreement. They both also spoke about cooperation between the two countries, such as AUKUS. In March 2023, they both met – alongside Australian prime minister Anthony Albanese – at an AUKUS summit in San Diego (where Biden jokingly asked Sunak if he could come to Sunak's California home).

=== Starmer and Biden (July 2024 – January 2025) ===
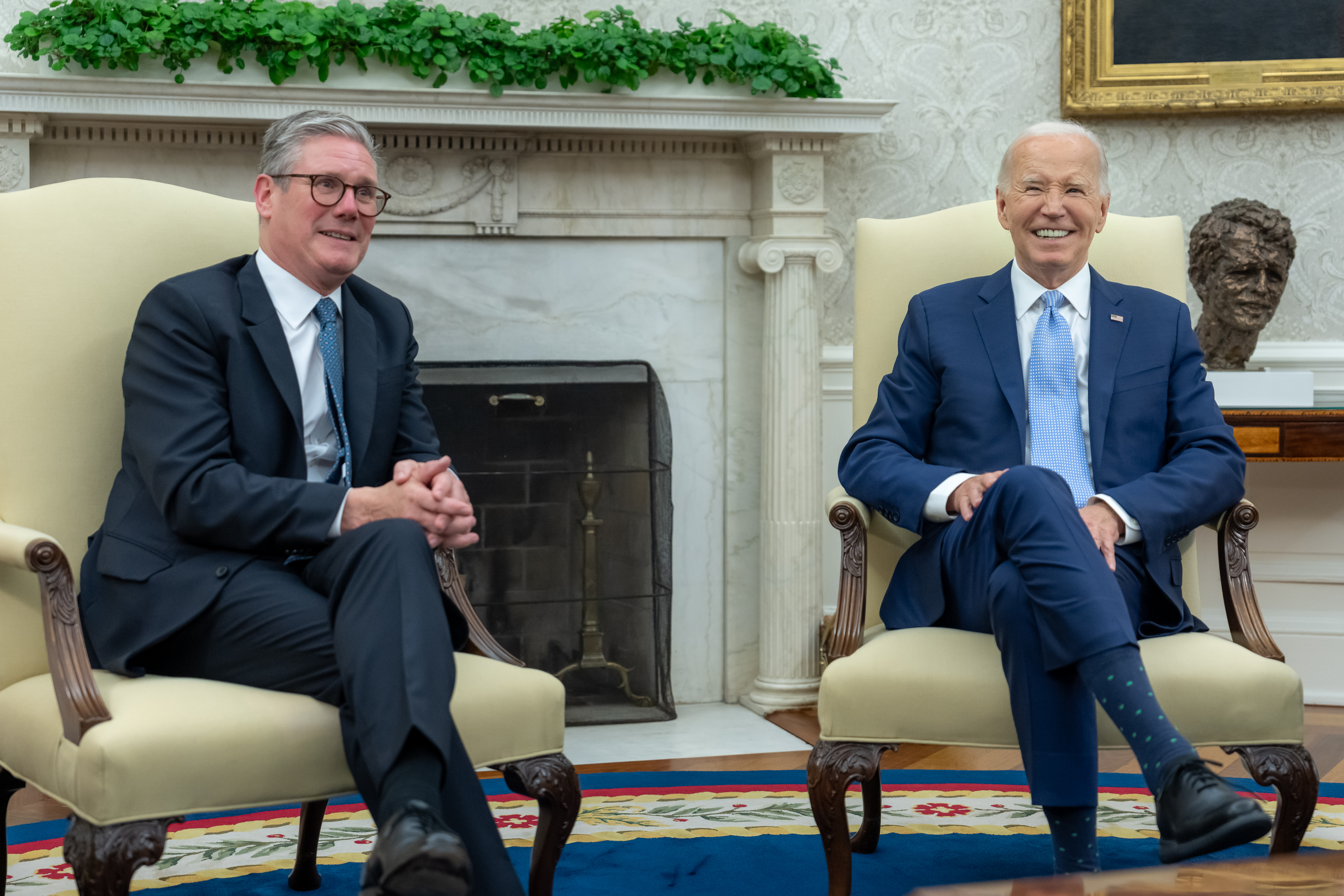
Prime Minister Keir Starmer (left) and President Joe Biden (right) in the Oval Office, July 2024.

Keir Starmer became Prime Minister of the United Kingdom on 5 July 2024. His first face-to-face meeting with President Biden took place in Washington DC on 10 July 2024 in conjunction with NATO's 75th anniversary summit.

=== Starmer and Trump (January 2025 – July 2026) ===
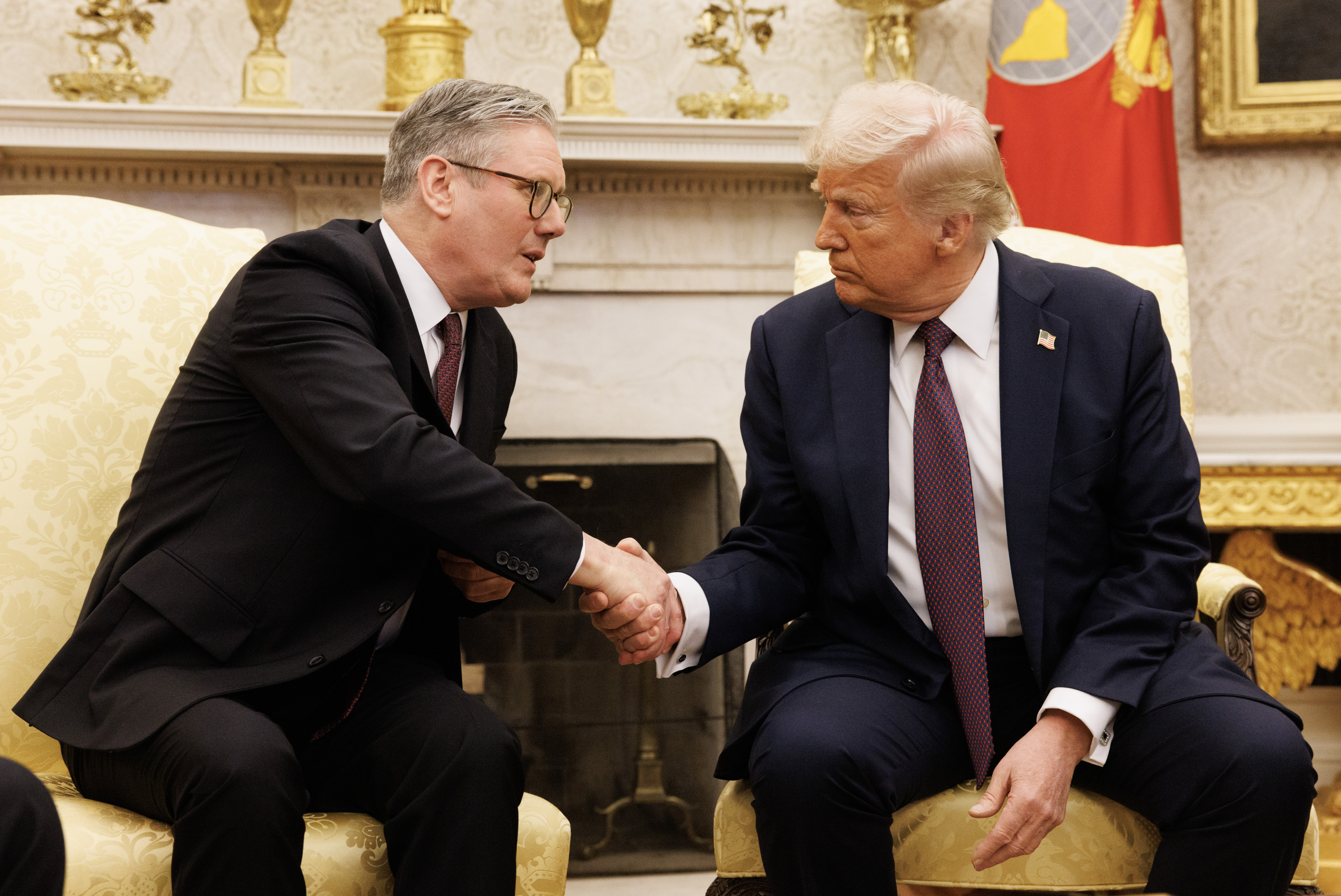
Prime Minister Keir Starmer (left) and President Donald Trump (right) in the Oval Office, February 2025.

Following the election of Donald Trump, Starmer released a statement congratulating him, emphasising the legendary status of the special relationship and highlighting the need to work with the new administration.

Trump and Starmer met before the former's election as president at Mar-a-Lago, where they had dinner together.

Upon Trump's victory, he appointed businessman Warren Stephens as the nominee for Ambassador to the UK, awaiting Senate conformation. Starmer appointed Lord Peter Mandelson in turn as ambassador to the US, taking office shortly after Trump's inauguration.

Trump was inaugurated on 20 January 2025, officially becoming president, and Mandelson was appointed ambassador officially just under a month later.

Trump, famed for his broad promises of tariffs, seemed to avoid taxing UK goods, saying they were 'out of line', but a deal could probably be worked out between them.

Starmer visited the White House on 7 February, and brought with him an invitation from King Charles III for a second state visit to the UK at a later date. Both leaders discussed on the day a possibility of a trade deal between the two countries.

During Trump's speech on his 'Liberation Day' when he imposed tariffs on numerous other countries, the USA officially placed a 10% tariff on the UK and a 25% tariff on all foreign vehicle imports, including from the UK. Starmer responded saying the UK needed to be calm in their response, and later drew up plans for a list of 417 items that could receive reciprocal tariffs.

The state visit took place on 16–17 September. Trump was hosted by King Charles III, and eventually a trade deal was agreed between the two countries.

Trump arrived in the United Kingdom on 16 September 2025, with the official state visit taking place on 17–18 September. He was hosted by King Charles III at Windsor Castle. The two countries had announced the general terms of the US–UK Economic Prosperity Deal in May 2025, several months before the visit. During the state visit, the two governments signed the Technology Prosperity Deal, a non-binding memorandum of understanding concerning cooperation in artificial intelligence, quantum technologies and civil nuclear energy. The United States suspended its implementation in December 2025 amid disagreements over wider trade issues. Talks reportedly resumed on a limited basis in February 2026, with an initial focus on civil nuclear cooperation. In July 2026, the House of Commons Business and Trade Committee described the framework as having been abandoned after three months and stated that it had been suspended before producing substantive outcomes.

In September 2025, Mandelson was fired from his post as US ambassador due to revelations about the nature of his relationship with Jeffrey Epstein.

Tensions further increased in early 2026 after Trump criticised NATO allies for allegedly keeping their forces "behind the front lines" during the war in Afghanistan, remarks widely interpreted in the United Kingdom as referring to British troops and which drew criticism from British politicians and veterans. Relations were also strained by disagreements over U.S. policy regarding Greenland, an autonomous territory of the Kingdom of Denmark, an ally of the UK.

Starmer's persistence in maintaining the Special Relationship has led to him making statements about Trump's actions in Venezuela that were generally contrary to public and party opinion. 47% of Britons disapproved of Starmer's handling of the attacks in January 2026: Trump himself continues to be very unpopular with the British public, holding a -35 point approval rating. American perception of Starmer is fairly neutral, and he is known by less than half of the American public as of January 2026. Starmer has presided over a period of increasingly hostility to America, largely over American foreign policy.

In February and March 2026, US president Donald Trump lamented over the state of the "Special Relationship" with the United Kingdom, stating the relationship is "obviously not what it was", and that UK prime minister Keir Starmer "has not been helpful". This followed Starmer rejecting the use of UK military bases in the United States' air strikes on Iran. In February 2026, the British ambassador to the United States, Christian Turner, said that the term "special relationship" as used between the US and UK was "quite nostalgic, it's quite backwards-looking, and it has a lot of baggage about it". He also added that "I think there is probably one country that has a special relationship with the United States — and that is probably Israel". These comments were made shortly before the US-Israeli strikes on Iran that led to the 2026 Iran war.

In April 2026, Charles III made an official state visit to the United States.

=== Burnham and Trump (July 2026 – present) ===
Prime Minister Andy Burnham (left) and President Donald Trump (right) in New York City, September 2026.

After being appointed as Prime Minister on 20 July 2026, Andy Burnham and President Donald Trump spoke by phone, Burnham's first call with a foreign leader. Burnham invited Trump to Manchester. The two leaders met in person for the first time in New York on 22 September 2026 at the 81st session of the United Nations General Assembly.

== Public opinion ==
It has been noted that secret defence and intelligence links "that [have] minimal impact on ordinary people [play] a disproportionate role in the transatlantic friendship" and that perspectives on the Special Relationship differ.

=== Poll findings ===
A 1942 Gallup poll conducted after Pearl Harbor, before the arrival of American troops and Churchill's heavy promotion of the Special Relationship, showed the wartime ally of the Soviet Union was still more popular than the United States for 62% of Britons. However, only 6% had ever visited the United States and only 35% knew any Americans personally. In 1969, the United States was tied with the Commonwealth as the most important overseas connection for the British public, and Europe came in a distant third. By 1984, after a decade in the European Economic Community, Britons chose Europe as being the most important to them.

British opinion polls from the Cold War revealed ambivalent feelings towards the United States. Thatcher's 1979 agreement to base US cruise missiles in Britain was approved of by only 36% of Britons, and the proportion with little or no trust in the ability of the US to deal wisely with world affairs had soared from 38% in 1977 to 74% in 1984, when 49% wanted US nuclear bases in Britain removed, and 50% would have sent American-controlled cruise missiles back to the United States. At the same time, 59% of Britons supported their own country's nuclear deterrent, with 60% believing Britain should rely on both nuclear and conventional weapons, and 66% opposing unilateral nuclear disarmament. 53% of Britons opposed dismantling the Royal Navy's Polaris submarines. 70% of Britons still considered Americans to be very or fairly trustworthy, and in case of war, the Americans was the ally trusted overwhelmingly to come to Britain's aid and to risk its own security for the sake of that of Britain. They were also the two countries that were most alike in basic values such as willingness to fight for their country and the importance of freedom.

In 1986, 71% of Britons, questioned in a Mori poll the day after Reagan's bombing of Libya, disagreed with Thatcher's decision to allow the use of RAF bases, and two thirds in a Gallup survey opposed the bombing itself, the opposite of US opinion. The all-time low poll rating of Britain in the United States came in 1994, during the split over the Bosnian War, when 56% of Americans interviewed considered Britons to be close allies.

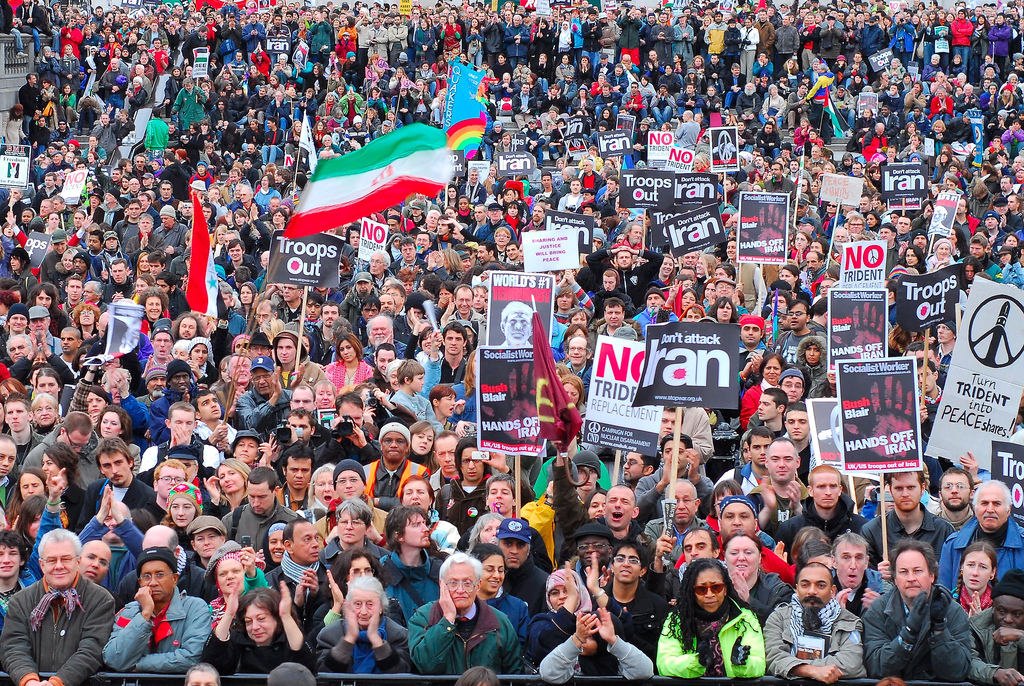
Anti-war protest in Trafalgar Square, February 2007

In Harris poll published after Blair's election, 63% of people in the United States viewed Britain as a close ally, up by 1% from 1996, 'confirming that the long-running "special relationship" with America's transatlantic cousins is still alive and well'. Canada ranked first with 73%, while Australia came third, with 48%. Popular awareness of the historic link was fading in the parent country, however. In a 1997 Gallup poll, 60% of the British public said they regretted the end of Empire and 70% expressed pride in the imperial past, 53% wrongly supposed that the United States had never been a British possession.

In 1998, 61% of Britons polled by ICM said they believed they had more in common with US citizens than they did with the rest of Europe. 64% disagreed with the sentence 'Britain does what the US government tells us to do'. A majority also backed Blair's support of Bill Clinton's strategy on Iraq, 42% saying action should be taken to topple Saddam Hussein, with 24% favouring diplomatic action and a further 24%, military action. A majority of Britons aged 24 or over said they disliked Blair supporting Clinton over the Lewinsky scandal.

A 2006 poll of the American public showed that Britain, as an "ally in the war on terror", was viewed more positively than any other country, and 76% of the US people polled viewed the British as an "ally in the war on terror" according to Rasmussen Reports. According to Harris Interactive, 74% of Americans viewed Great Britain as a 'close ally in the war in Iraq', well ahead of next-ranked Canada at 48%.

A June 2006 poll by Populus for The Times showed that the number of Britons agreeing that 'it is important for Britain's long-term security that we have a close and special relationship with America' had fallen to 58% (from 71% in April) and that 65% believed that 'Britain's future lies more with Europe than America.' Only 44% agreed that 'America is a force for good in the world.' A later poll during the Israel-Lebanon conflict found that 63% of Britons felt that the United Kingdom was tied too closely to the United States. A 2008 poll by The Economist showed that Britons' views differed considerably from Americans' views when asked about the topics of religion, values, and national interest. The Economist remarked:

For many Britons, steeped in the lore of how English-speaking democracies rallied around Britain in the second world war, [the special relationship] is something to cherish. For Winston Churchill, [...] it was a bond forged in battle. On the eve of the war in Iraq, as Britain prepared to fight alongside America, Tony Blair spoke of the 'blood price' that Britain should be prepared to pay in order to sustain the relationship. In America, it is not nearly as emotionally charged. Indeed American politicians are promiscuous with the term, trumpeting their 'special relationships' with Israel, Germany and South Korea, among others. 'Mention the special relationship to Americans and they say yes, it's a really special relationship,' notes sardonically Sir Christopher Meyer, a former British ambassador to Washington.

In January 2010 a Leflein poll conducted for Atlantic Bridge found that 57% of people in the US considered the special relationship with Britain to be the world's most important bilateral partnership, with 2% disagreeing. 60% of people in the US regarded Britain as the country most likely to support the United States in a crisis, and Canada came second on 24% and Australia third on 4%.

In May 2010, a poll conducted in the UK by YouGov revealed that 66% of those surveyed held a favourable view of the US and 62% agreed with the assertion that America was Britain's most important ally. However, the survey also revealed that 85% of British citizens believed that the UK has little or no influence on American policies and that 62% thought that America did not consider British interests. Another poll by YouGov in September 2016 revealed that 57% still believed in the special relationship, whilst 37% did not.

In a 2021 Pew Research Center poll, 31% of American respondents picked Britain as their closest foreign policy partner, making it by far the most picked choice (Canada was a distant second with 13%).

In September 2024, Emerson College Polling conducted a survey on behalf of the Association of Marshall Scholars to gauge public perceptions of the US-UK special relationship in comparison to other international relationships. 1,100 US residents were surveyed. Under the age of 30, 36% of residents rank China above the United Kingdom as the most valuable strategic partner to the United States. Conversely, only 4% of residents over the age of 70 held the same views. 27% of young respondents perceived the UK as the United States' most valuable ally, whilst 57% of respondents over 70 felt the same way. Despite these findings, the majority of respondents perceive the relationship as "very important" today. This again however reflects the demographic differences as 44% of Americans under 30 held this view as compared with 74% of Americans over 70 years old.

=== Iraq War ===
Following the 2003 invasion of Iraq, senior British figures criticized the refusal of the US government to heed British advice regarding postwar plans for Iraq, specifically the Coalition Provisional Authority's de-Ba'athification policy and the critical importance of preventing the power vacuum in which the insurgency then developed. British Defence Secretary Geoff Hoon later stated that the United Kingdom 'lost the argument' with the Bush administration over rebuilding Iraq.

=== Extraordinary rendition ===
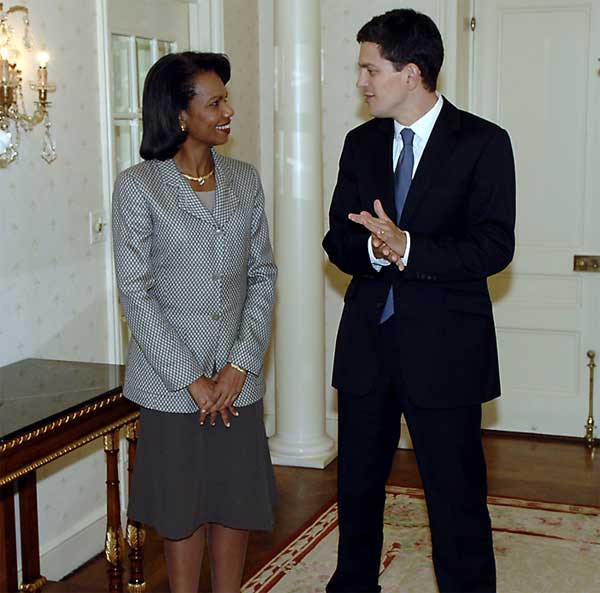
US Secretary of State Condoleezza Rice with British Foreign Secretary David Miliband, September 2007

Assurances made by the United States to the United Kingdom that 'extraordinary rendition' flights had never landed on British territory were later shown to be false when official US records proved that such flights had landed at Diego Garcia repeatedly. The revelation was an embarrassment for British foreign secretary David Miliband, who apologised to Parliament.

=== Criminal law ===
In 2003, the United States pressed the United Kingdom to agree to an extradition treaty, which proponents argued, allowed for equal extradition requirements between the two countries. Critics argued that the UK was obligated to make a strong prima facie case to US courts before extradition would be granted but that extradition from the United Kingdom to the United States was only a matter of administrative decision, without prima facie evidence. That had been implemented as an antiterrorist measure in the wake of 11 September 2001 attacks. Very soon, however, it was being used by the United States to extradite and prosecute a number of high-profile London businessmen (like the NatWest Three and Ian Norris) on fraud charges. Contrasts have been drawn with the Americans' harboring of Provisional IRA volunteers in the 1970s to the 1990s and repeated refusals to extradite them to Britain. The Death of Harry Dunn who was killed by the wife of a USA CIA officer on 27 August 2019 also caused criticism of the extradition treaty after Anne Sacoolas, the defendant, repatriated to the US and claimed diplomatic immunity against charges.

On 30 September 2006, the US Senate unanimously ratified the 2003 treaty. Ratification had been slowed by complaints from some Irish-American groups that the treaty would create new legal jeopardy for US citizens who opposed British policy in Northern Ireland. The Spectator condemned the three-year delay as 'an appalling breach in a long-treasured relationship'.

The United States also refused to accede to another priority of the Blair government, the treaty setting up the International Criminal Court.

=== Trade policy ===
Trade disputes and attendant job fears have sometimes strained the Special Relationship. The United States has been accused of pursuing an aggressive trade policy by using or ignoring World Trade Organization rules. The aspects causing most difficulty to the United Kingdom have been a successful challenge to the protection of small family banana farmers in the West Indies from large US corporations such as the American Financial Group, and high tariffs on British steel products. In 2002, Blair denounced Bush's imposition of tariffs on steel as "unacceptable, unjustified and wrong", but although Britain's biggest steelmaker, Corus, called for protection from dumping by developing nations, the Confederation of British Industry urged the government not to start a "tit-for-tat".

== See also ==
- ABCANZ Armies (Five Eyes)
- Anglo-America
- Atlanticism
- Foreign policy of the United States
- Foreign relations of the United Kingdom
- Great Rapprochement
- Pilgrims Society
- The Technical Cooperation Program (TTCP)
- United Kingdom–United States relations
