= List of environmental reports =

This is a list of notable environmental reports. In this context they relate to the impacts of human activity on the environment.

- Clean Energy Trends – a series of reports by Clean Edge – beginning in 2002
- Copeland Report – for the U.S. government, completed in 1933
- Copenhagen Diagnosis – written by twenty-six climate scientists from eight countries
- Dioxin Reassessment Report – by the United States Environmental Protection Agency
- Environmental Impact of the Big Cypress Swamp Jetport ("Leopold Report") – United States Department of the Interior (1969)
- Environmental Risks and Challenges of Anthropogenic Metals Flows and Cycles – by the International Resource Panel
- Forest Principles – United Nations Conference on Environment and Development (UNCED)
- The Global Assessment Report on Biodiversity and Ecosystem Services — Intergovernmental Science-Policy Platform on Biodiversity and Ecosystem Services (2019)
- The Global 2000 Report to the President – Council on Environmental Quality (1981)
- Global Environment Outlook – United Nations Environment Programme (UNEP)
- Hirsch report (Peaking of World Oil Production: Impacts, Mitigation, and Risk Management) – United States Department of Energy
- Index of Leading Environmental Indicators – Pacific Research Institute
- IPCC First Assessment Report – Intergovernmental Panel on Climate Change (IPCC)
- IPCC supplementary report, 1992 – IPCC
- IPCC Second Assessment Report – IPCC
- IPCC Third Assessment Report Climate Change 2001 – IPCC (2001)
- IPCC Fourth Assessment Report Climate Change 2007 – IPCC (2007)
- IPCC Fifth Assessment Report (2014)
- Leopold Report ("Wildlife Management in the National Parks") – Special Advisory Board on Wildlife Management (1963)
- Livestock's Long Shadow – Environmental Issues and Options – United Nations (2006)
- Living Planet Report – WWF, every two years
- Making Sweden an Oil-Free Society – Government of Sweden (2006)
- Meat Atlas – published by the Heinrich Böll Foundation and Friends of the Earth Europe
- Nuclear Power and the Environment – UK Royal Commission on Environmental Pollution – 1976
- Our Common Future – World Commission on Environment and Development (1987)
- Outlook On Renewable Energy In America (2 volumes) – American Council on Renewable Energy – 2007
- Phase I Environmental Site Assessment – generic
- Pollution and Health (Lancet Commission Report on Pollution and Health 2017
- Planning Policy Statement 10: Planning for Sustainable Waste Management (PPS 10) – British Government
- Renewable Energy Sources and Climate Change Mitigation – United Nations Intergovernmental Panel on Climate Change (IPCC) – planned for 2010
- Report of the Royal Commission on Genetic Modification – Royal Commission on Genetic Modification (2001)
- State of the Climate – NOAA/NCDC (published annually)
- The State of the World – Worldwatch Institute (published yearly since 1984)
- US Environmental Protection Agency – Report on the Environment – US EPA (2016)
- Wegman Report – to validate criticisms of reconstructions of the temperature record of the past 1000 years
- Windscale: Britain’s Biggest Nuclear Disaster (2007)
- World Climate Report – Greening Earth Society
- The World's 25 Most Endangered Primates – selected and published by the IUCN Species Survival Commission Primate Specialist Group (IUCN/SSC PSG), the International Primatological Society (IPS), and Conservation International (CI)

== See also ==
- Why the future doesn't need us – Bill Joy – April 2000 issue of Wired magazine
- 2008 Climatic Research Unit study
- Garnaut Climate Change Review
- Global Environment Outlook
- Green annual report
- List of environmental books
- List of environmental law reviews and journals
- List of environmental periodicals
- List of environmental websites
- Lists of environmental publications
- State of the Environment
