= GEO-3 =

GEO-3 may refer to:

- the third in a series of Global Environment Outlook reports issued in 2002 by the United Nations Environmental Program
- SBIRS GEO 3, the potential third in a series of geosynchronous orbit space surveillance satellites planned as part of the United States Air Force's Space-Based Infrared System
