= Waste management =

Activities and actions required to manage waste from its source to its final disposal

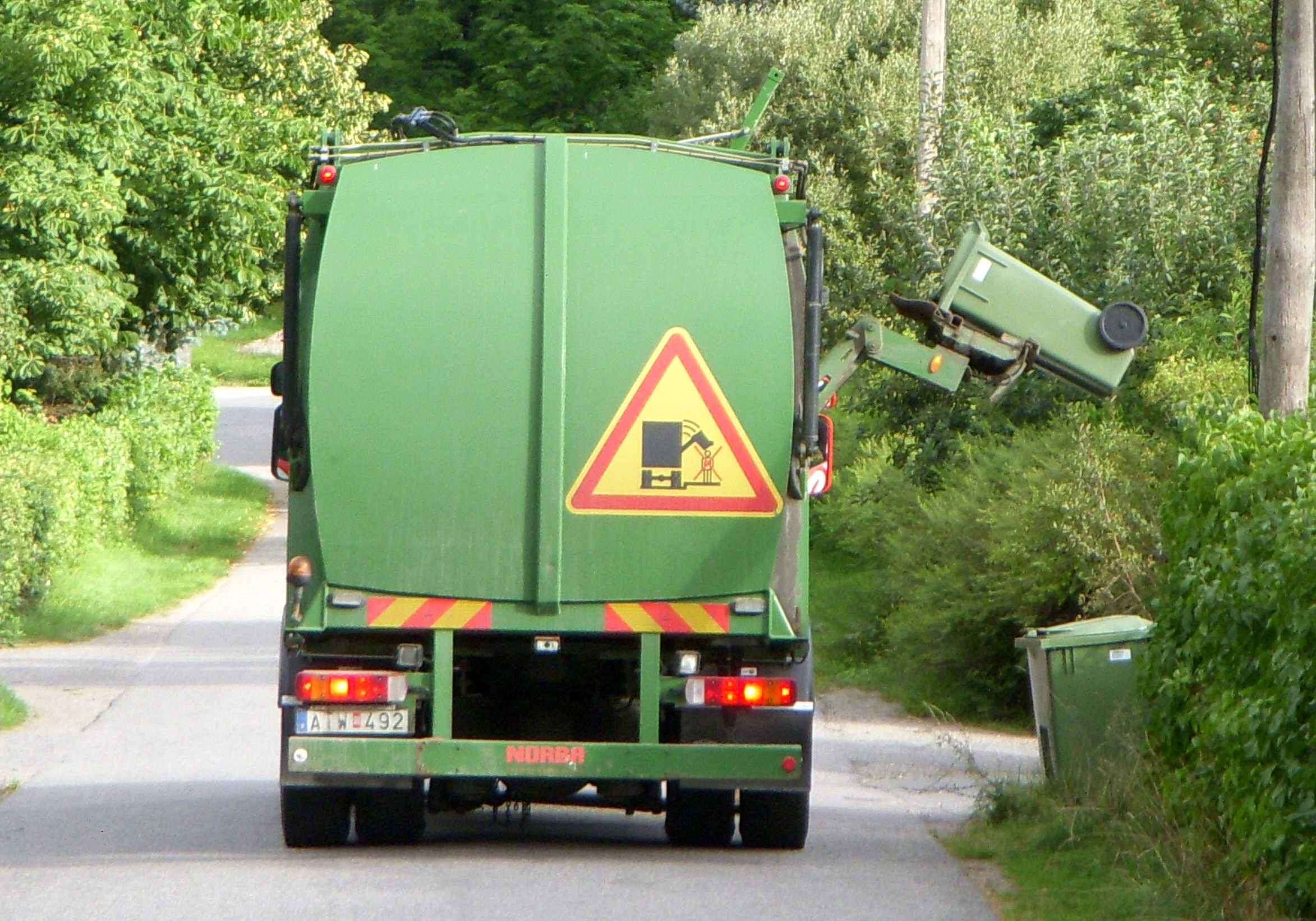
A specialized trash collection truck providing regular municipal trash collection in a neighborhood in Stockholm, Sweden.

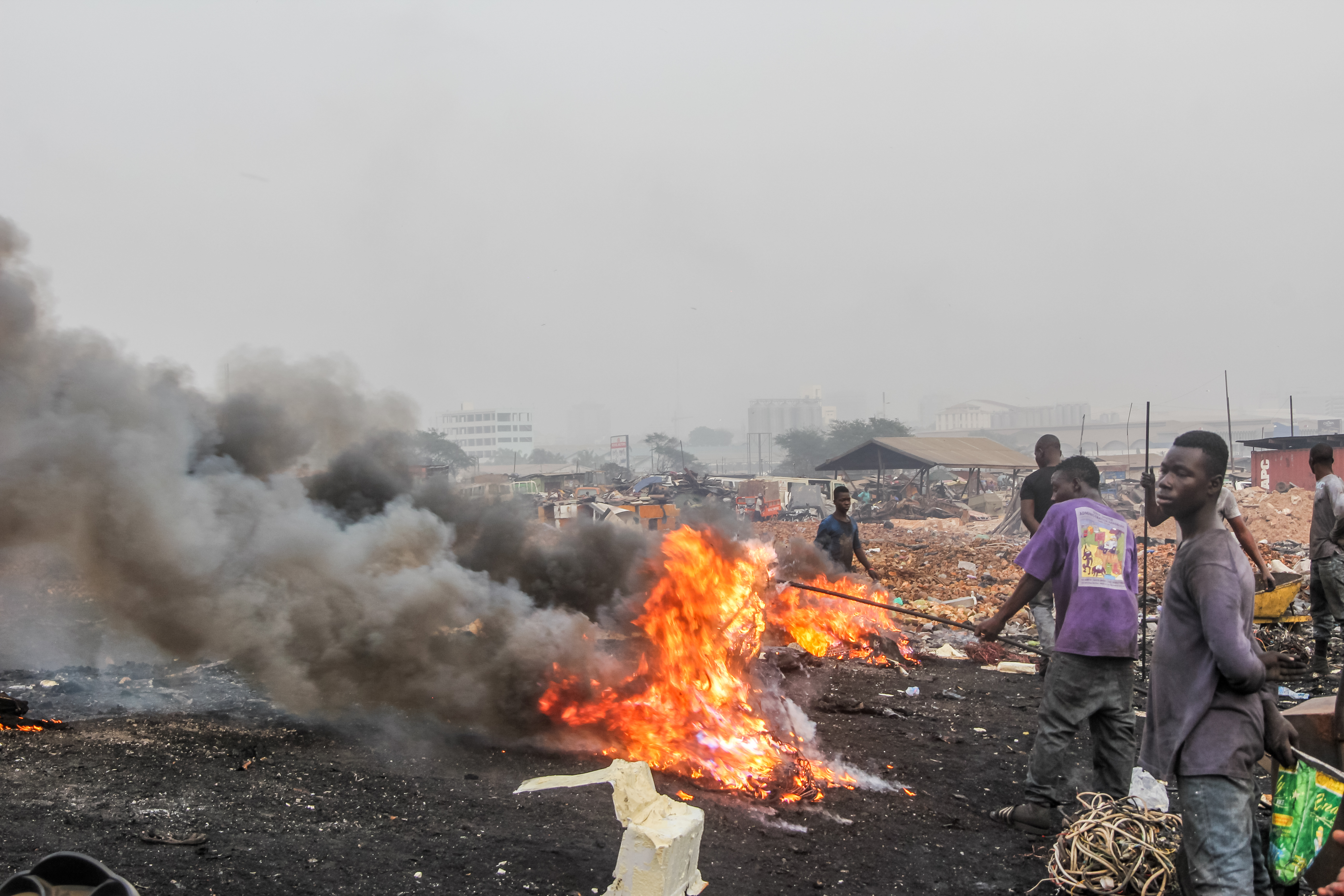
Waste pickers burning e-waste in Agbogbloshie, a site near Accra in Ghana that processes large volumes of international electronic waste. The pickers burn the plastics off of materials and collect the metals for recycling, However, this process exposes pickers and their local communities to toxic fumes.

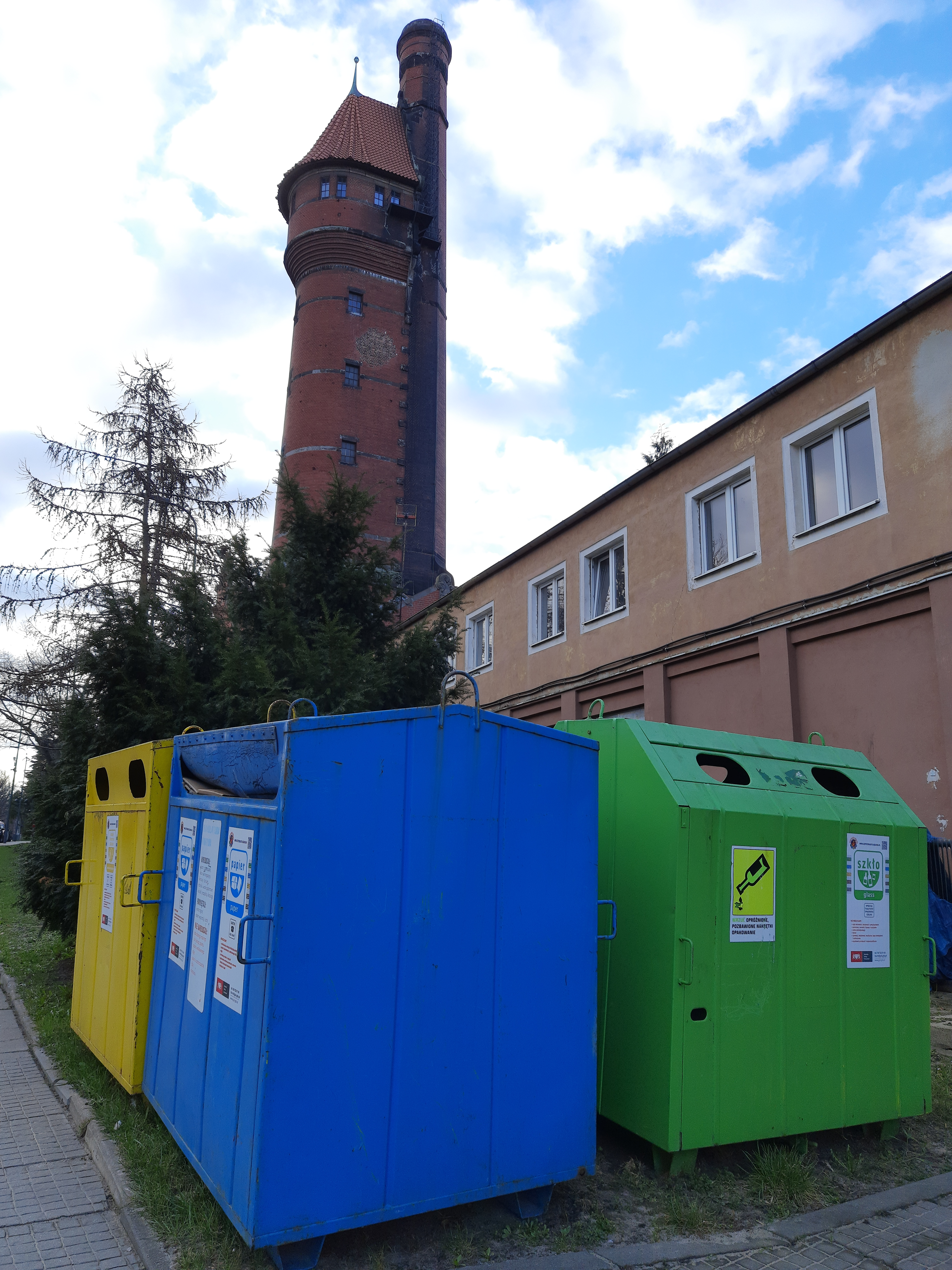
Containers for consumer waste collection at the Gdańsk University of Technology.

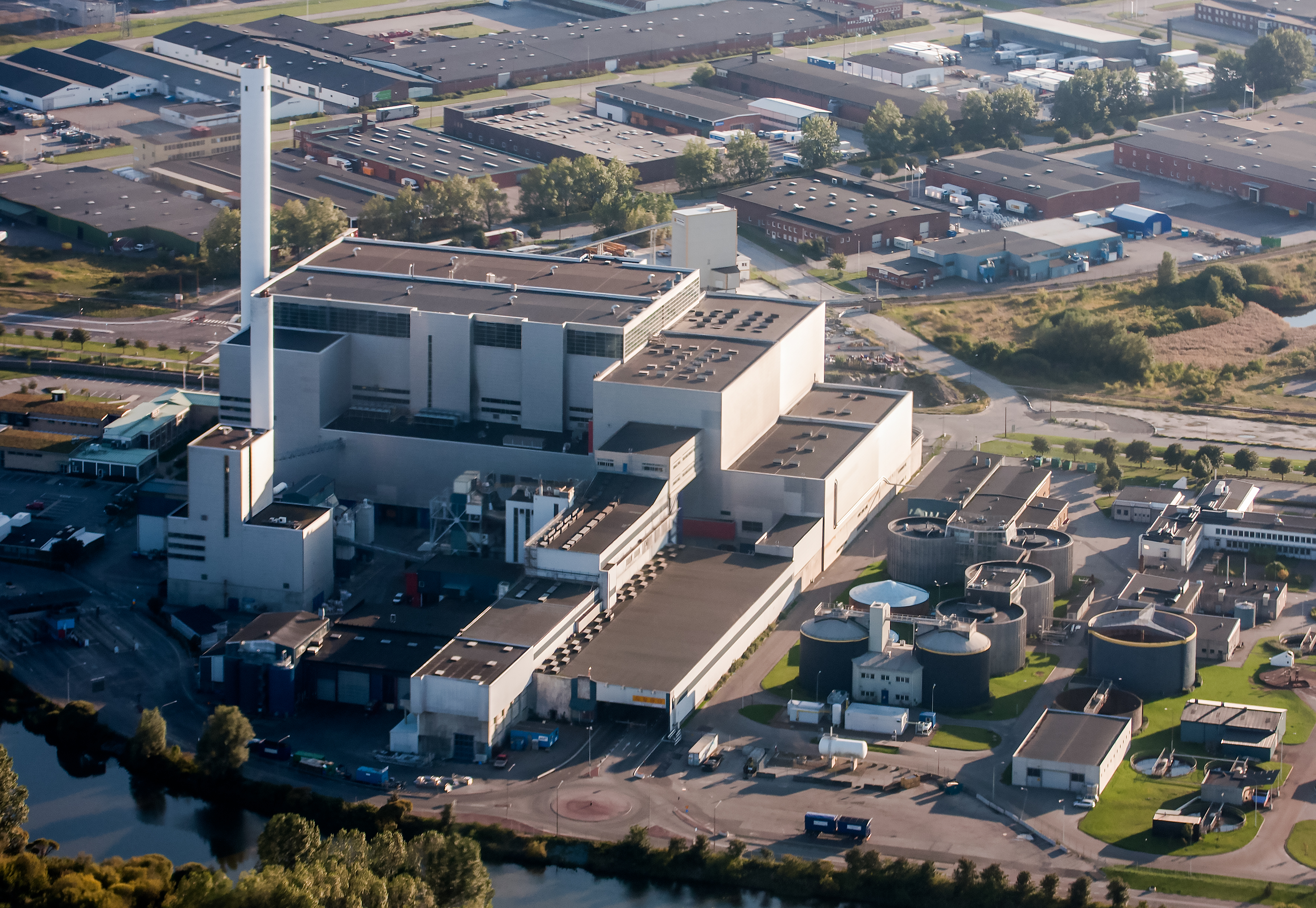
A recycling and waste-to-energy plant for waste that is not exported.

Waste management or waste disposal includes the processes and actions required to manage waste from its inception to its final disposal. This includes the collection, transport, treatment, and disposal of waste, together with monitoring and regulation of the waste management process and waste-related laws, technologies, and economic mechanisms.

Waste management practices are not the same across countries (developed and developing nations); regions (urban and rural areas) and residential and industrial sectors can all take different approaches. Effective waste management can be relatively expensive, with one report estimating that it usually comprises 20%–50% of municipal budgets. In high-income countries, waste management typically includes street collection and transportation to controlled or sanitary landfills, incinerators, or recycling centers. In lower-income countries, practices vary, but a sizable portion of waste is stored in open dumps or openly burned, in addition to more sanitary methods. According to one estimate of global waste, approximately a fourth of all the municipal solid terrestrial waste is not collected, and an additional fourth is mismanaged after collection, often being burned in open and uncontrolled fires – or close to one billion tons per year when combined.

Waste itself and poor waste management methods can pose human health harm and environmental harm by polluting air, water, soil, and food. The aim of waste management is to reduce the adverse effects of waste on human health, the environment, planetary resources, and aesthetics. Waste management deals with all types of waste (whether solid, liquid, or gases), including industrial, chemical, municipal, organic, biomedical, and radioactive wastes. A large portion of waste management practices deal with municipal solid waste (MSW), which is the bulk of the waste that is created by household, industrial, and commercial activity. According to the Intergovernmental Panel on Climate Change (IPCC), municipal solid waste is expected to reach approximately 3.4 Gt by 2050; however, policies and lawmaking can reduce the amount of waste produced in different areas and cities of the world.

Effective 'Waste Management' involves the practice of '7R' - 'R'efuse, 'R'educe', 'R'euse, 'R'epair, 'R'epurpose, 'R'ecycle and 'R'ecover. Amongst these '7R's, the first two ('Refuse' and 'Reduce') relate to the non-creation of waste, such as reducing consumption. The next two ('Reuse' and 'Repair') refer to increasing the usage of the existing product. 'Repurpose' and 'Recycle' involve maximum usage of the materials used in the product, and 'Recover' is the least preferred and least efficient waste management practice involving the recovery of embedded energy in the waste material. For example, burning the waste to produce heat (and electricity from heat).

== Principles of waste management ==
Diagram of the waste hierarchy

=== Waste hierarchy ===
The waste hierarchy refers to the "3 Rs" Reduce, Reuse and Recycle, which classifies waste management strategies according to their desirability in terms of waste minimisation. The waste hierarchy is the bedrock of most waste minimization strategies. The aim of the waste hierarchy is to extract the maximum practical benefits from products and to generate the minimum amount of end waste; see: resource recovery. The waste hierarchy is represented as a pyramid because the basic premise is that policies should promote measures to prevent the generation of waste. The next step or preferred action is to seek alternative uses for the waste that has been generated, i.e., by reuse. The next is recycling which includes composting. Following this step is material recovery and waste-to-energy. The final action is disposal, in landfills or through incineration without energy recovery. This last step is the final resort for waste that has not been prevented, diverted, or recovered. The waste hierarchy represents the progression of a product or material through the sequential stages of the pyramid of waste management. The hierarchy represents the latter parts of the life-cycle for each product.

=== Product lifecycle ===
A product lifecycle begins with the design phase and proceeds through manufacture, distribution, and primary use. After these initial stages, the product may be reused, recycled, or disposed of. Designers and manufacturers contribute to waste management through source reduction (waste prevention), such as by selecting materials that have lower environmental impacts and creating products that require less energy and resources to produce.

=== Resource efficiency ===
Resource efficiency reflects the understanding that global economic growth and development can not be sustained at current production and consumption patterns. Globally, humanity extracts more resources to produce goods than the planet can replenish. Resource efficiency is the reduction of the environmental impact from the production and consumption of these goods, from final raw material extraction to the last use and disposal.

=== Polluter-pays principle ===
The polluter-pays principle mandates that the polluting parties pay for the impact on the environment. With respect to waste management, this generally refers to the requirement for a waste generator to pay for appropriate disposal of the unrecoverable materials.

== History ==
Throughout most of history, the amount of waste generated by humans was insignificant due to low levels of population density and exploitation of natural resources. Common waste produced during pre-modern times was mainly ashes and human biodegradable waste, and these were released back into the ground locally with minimal environmental impact. Tools made out of wood or metal were generally reused or passed down through the generations.

However, some civilizations have been more profligate in their waste output than others. In particular, the Maya of Central America had designated dump sites where rubbish was collected and burned.

In the Ashanti Empire by the 19th century, there existed a Public Works Department that was responsible for sanitation in Kumasi and its suburbs. They kept the streets clean daily and commanded civilians to keep their compounds clean and weeded.

=== United Kingdom ===
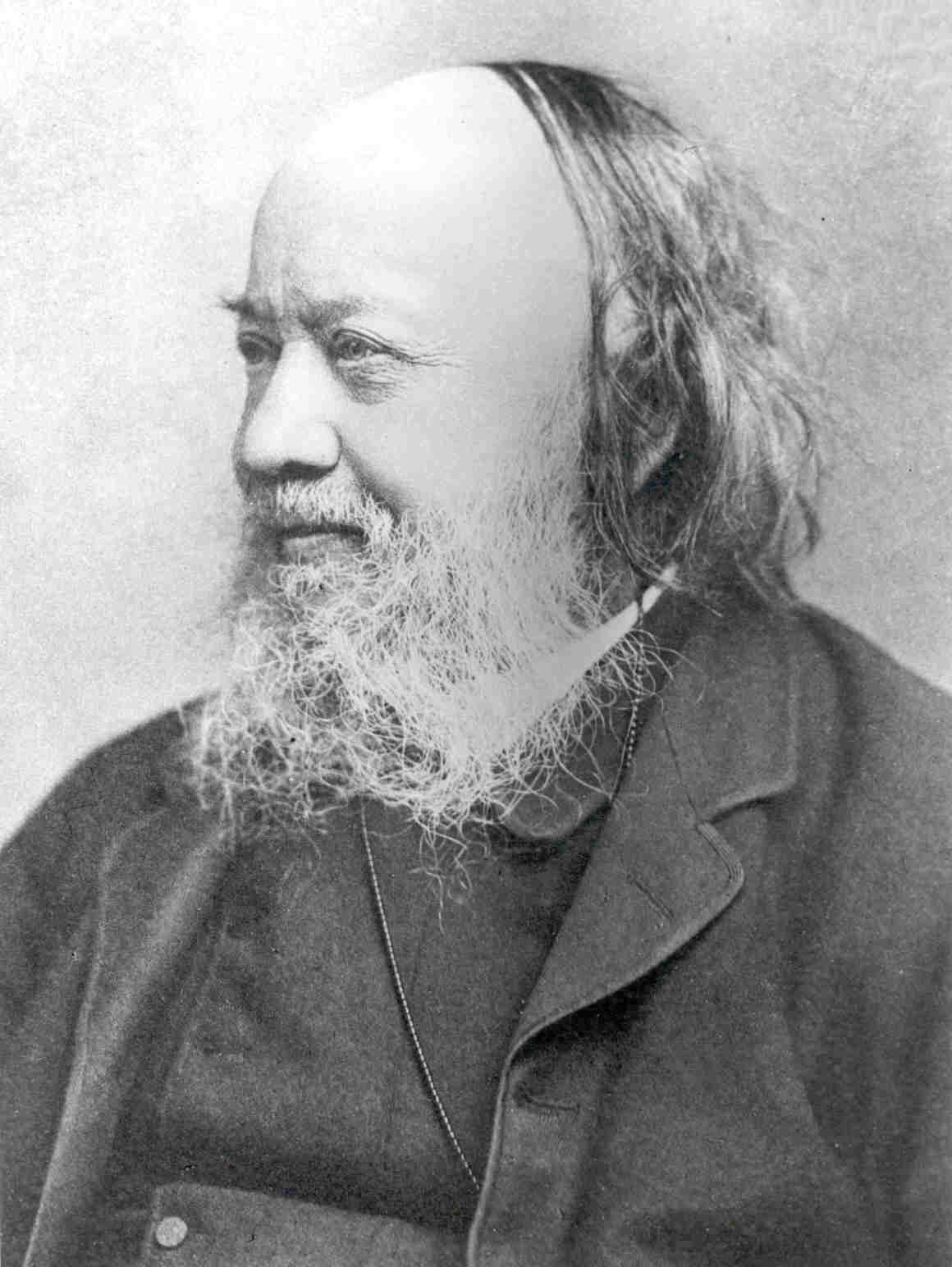
Edwin Chadwick's 1842 report The Sanitary Condition of the Labouring Population was influential in securing the passage of the first legislation aimed at waste clearance and disposal.

Following the onset of the Industrial Revolution, industrialisation, and the sustained urban growth of large population centres in England, the buildup of waste in the cities caused a rapid deterioration in levels of sanitation and the general quality of urban life. The streets became choked with filth due to the lack of waste clearance regulations. Calls for the establishment of municipal authority with waste removal powers occurred as early as 1751, when Corbyn Morris in London proposed that "... as the preservation of the health of the people is of great importance, it is proposed that the cleaning of this city, should be put under one uniform public management, and all the filth be...conveyed by the Thames to proper distance in the country".

However, it was not until the mid-19th century, spurred by increasingly devastating cholera outbreaks and the emergence of a public health debate that the first legislation on the issue emerged. Highly influential in this new focus was the report The Sanitary Condition of the Labouring Population in 1842 of the social reformer, Edwin Chadwick, in which he argued for the importance of adequate waste removal and management facilities to improve the health and wellbeing of the city's population.

In the UK, the Nuisance Removal and Disease Prevention Act of 1846 began what was to be a steadily evolving process of the provision of regulated waste management in London. The Metropolitan Board of Works was the first citywide authority that centralized sanitation regulation for the rapidly expanding city, and the Public Health Act 1875 made it compulsory for every household to deposit their weekly waste in "moveable receptacles" for disposal—the first concept for a dustbin.

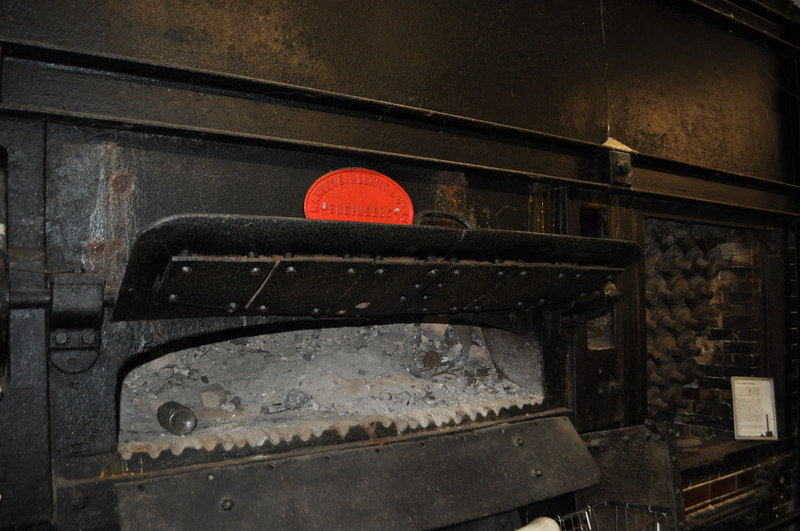
Manlove, Alliott & Co. Ltd. 1894 destructor furnace. The use of incinerators for waste disposal became popular in the late 19th century.

The dramatic increase in waste for disposal led to the creation of the first incineration plants, or, as they were then called, "destructors". In 1874, the first incinerator was built in Nottingham by Manlove, Alliott & Co. Ltd. to the design of Alfred Fryer. However, these were met with opposition on account of the large amounts of ash they produced and which wafted over the neighbouring areas.

Similar municipal systems of waste disposal sprung up at the turn of the 20th century in other large cities of Europe and North America.

Early garbage removal trucks were simply open-bodied dump trucks pulled by a team of horses. They became motorized in the early part of the 20th century and the first closed-body trucks to eliminate odours with a dumping lever mechanism were introduced in the 1920s in Britain. These were soon equipped with 'hopper mechanisms' where the scooper was loaded at floor level and then hoisted mechanically to deposit the waste in the truck. The Garwood Load Packer was the first truck in 1938, to incorporate a hydraulic compactor.

=== United States ===
Waste management in the United States dates back to colonial times, with New Amsterdam (now New York City) making it illegal to throw waste into the street as early as 1654. In the mid-1700s, Benjamin Franklin started the first waste collection and street-cleaning service in the History of Philadelphia. He wrote and distributed papers explaining the benefits of clean streets, convincing residents to pay a small fee for regular cleaning. His efforts led to the paving and cleaning of Philadelphia's streets, making them more accessible and reducing dust and debris. His advocacy contributed to the passage of a 1762 law regulating street maintenance.

Historian Martin Melosi outlines the history of American urban sanitation through three distinct phases, each defined by evolving concerns about water supply, sewerage, and waste disposal:

- The Age of Miasmas (Colonial Era–1880): As cities rapidly expanded, particularly after 1830, sanitation became a pressing issue. Influenced by English beliefs, American officials mistakenly blamed epidemic diseases on "miasmas"—unpleasant odors from accumulated filth. They focused on improving water supply and building mile after mile of sewers through residential neighborhoods to handle wastewater removal. No miasma supposedly meant no disease. Throughout the 1800s, cities typically relied on animals for organic waste disposal—even New York City used piggeries, with thousands of pigs roaming freely through the streets consuming city refuse.
- The Bacteriological Revolution (1880–1945): Melosi finds that scientific breakthroughs in Europe revealed that germs, not miasmas, caused epidemics. This led to more effective disease prevention strategies and the development of comprehensive sanitation systems based on pure water supplies. Cities also began experimenting with solid waste disposal methods, particularly to manage the mountains of human and horse waste. However, they were late to deal with smoke pollution and they ignored industrial chemicals. In 1895, New York City became the first American city with public-sector garbage management. By the late 1880s the city government in Chicago hired 225 st teams, which gathered over 2,000 cubic yards of refuse daily. In Manhattan in New York City, individual scavengers carted away over 600 tons of garbage every day, and in the summer, over 1000 tons a day. The era of terrible epidemics such as cholera practically ended. (The worldwide "Spanish flu" epidemic of 1919 was a major killer that was not caused by urban waste.)
- The New Ecology (Since 1945): Continued urban expansion, Melosi argues, has strained sanitation infrastructure, requiring costly cleanup and repairs. Since the 1960s, growing environmental awareness has broadened concerns beyond biological pollutants to include industrial and chemical contaminants. In 1962 Rachel Carson reached a huge popular audience with Silent Spring that warned that pesticides especially DDT were greatly damaging the environment—spring was eerily quiet because DDT was killing the songbirds. Public opinion forced wave after wave of government interventions from the national level, such as the Environmental Protection Agency.

== Waste handling and transport ==
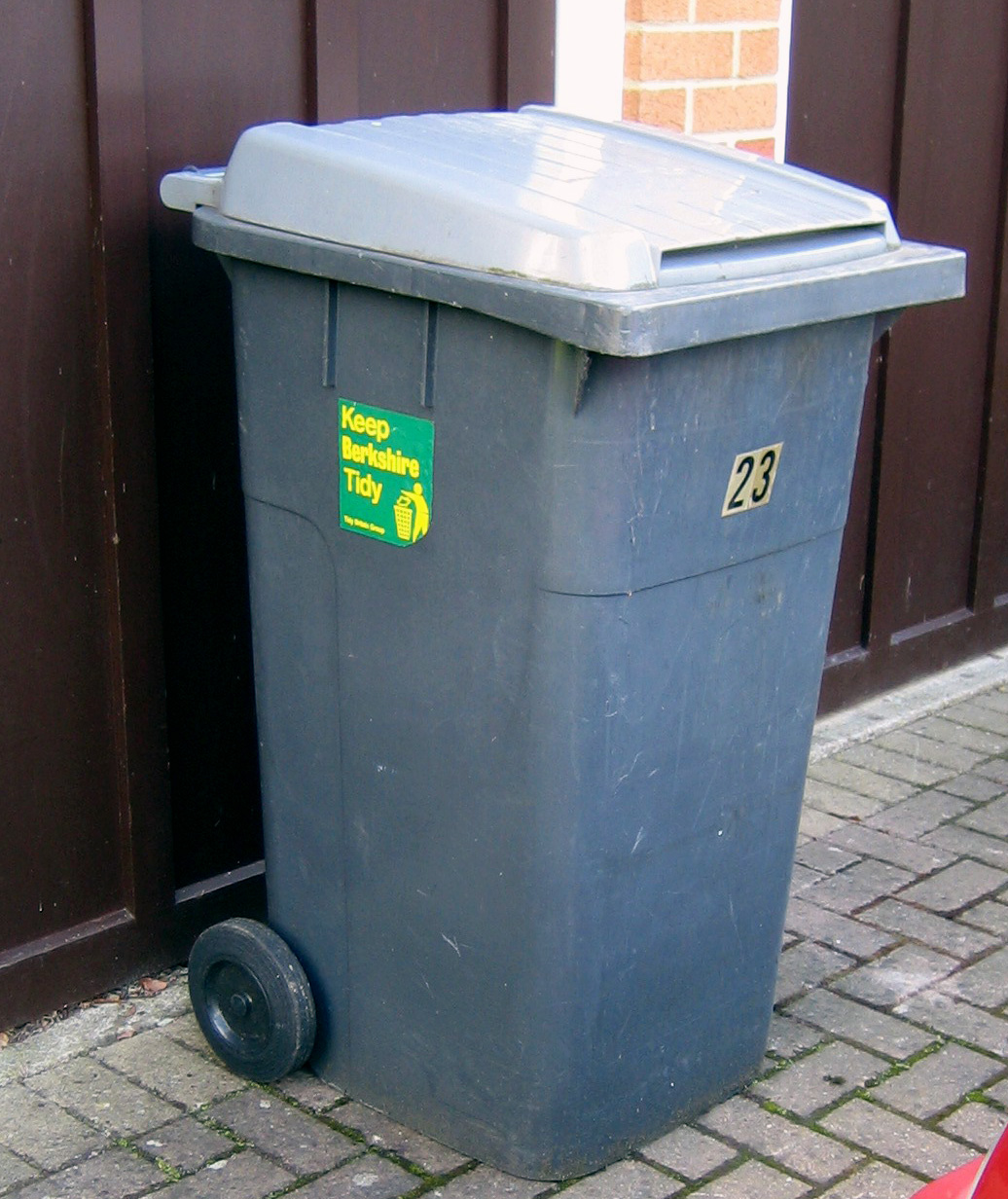
Moulded plastic, wheeled waste bin in Berkshire, England.

Waste collection methods vary widely among different countries and regions. Domestic waste collection services are often provided by local government authorities, or by private companies for industrial and commercial waste. Some areas, especially those in less developed countries, do not have formal waste-collection systems.

Community-led initiatives such as Buz Stop Boys have contributed to improving urban sanitation in Accra.

=== Waste handling and transport ===
Curbside collection is the most common method of disposal in most European countries, Canada, New Zealand, the United States, and many other parts of the developed world in which waste is collected at regular intervals by specialised trucks. This is often associated with curb-side waste segregation. In rural areas, waste may need to be taken to a transfer station. Waste collected is then transported to an appropriate disposal facility. In some areas, vacuum collection is used in which waste is transported from the home or commercial premises by vacuum along small bore tubes. Systems are in use in Europe and North America.

In some jurisdictions, unsegregated waste is collected at the curb-side or from waste transfer stations and then sorted into recyclables and unusable waste. Such systems are capable of sorting large volumes of solid waste, salvaging recyclables, and turning the rest into bio-gas and soil conditioners. In San Francisco, the local government established its Mandatory Recycling and Composting Ordinance in support of its goal of "Zero waste by 2020", requiring everyone in the city to keep recyclables and compostables out of the landfill. The three streams are collected with the curbside "Fantastic 3" bin system – blue for recyclables, green for compostables, and black for landfill-bound materials – provided to residents and businesses and serviced by San Francisco's sole refuse hauler, Recology. The city's "Pay-As-You-Throw" system charges customers by the volume of landfill-bound materials, which provides a financial incentive to separate recyclables and compostables from other discards. The city's Department of the Environment's Zero Waste Program has led the city to achieve 80% diversion, the highest diversion rate in North America. Other businesses such as Waste Industries use a variety of colors to distinguish between trash and recycling cans. In addition, in some areas of the world the disposal of municipal solid waste can cause environmental strain due to official not having benchmarks that help measure the environmental sustainability of certain practices.

=== Waste separation ===
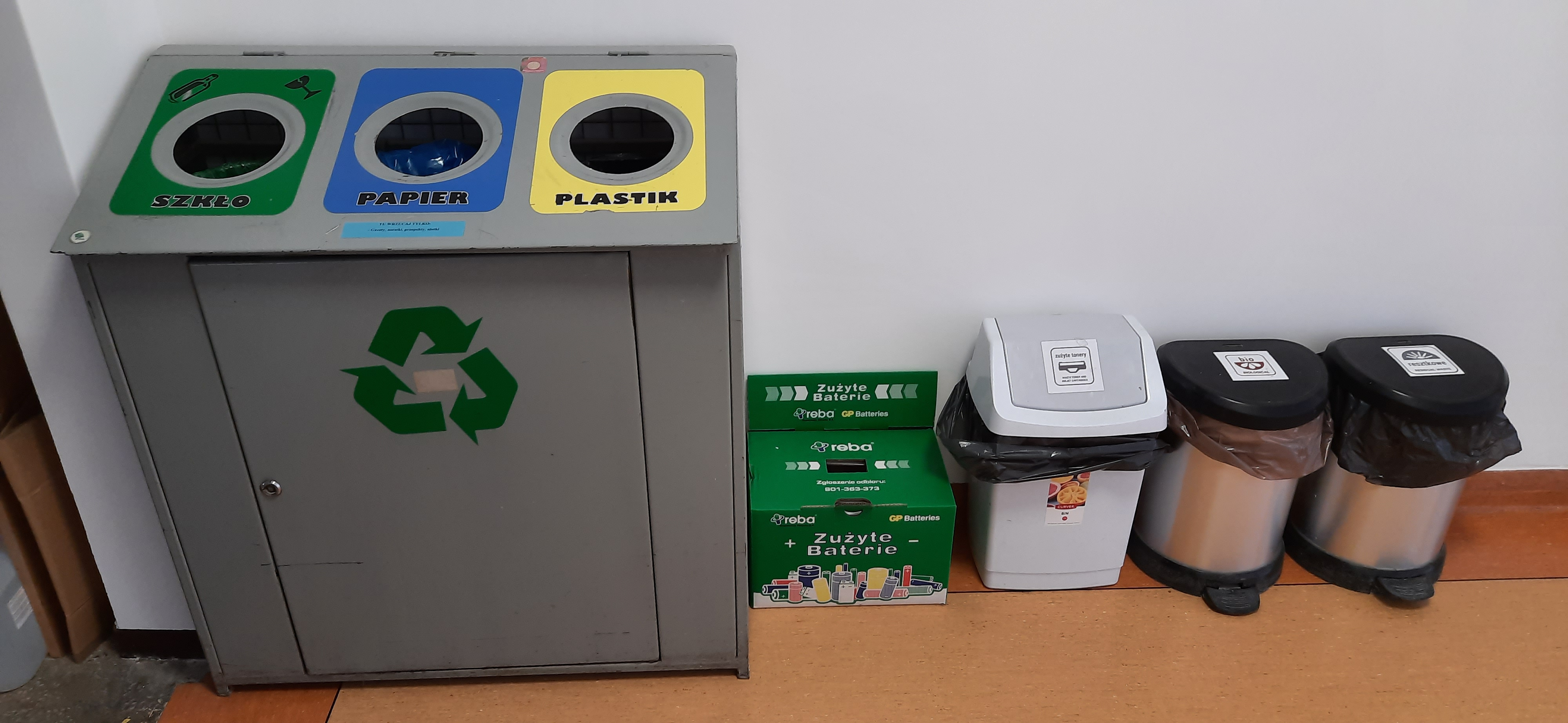
Recycling point at the Gdańsk University of Technology.

Waste separation refers to the separation of different forms of waste to facilitate sustainable disposal. Contemporary solutions typically involve separating disposed materials into recyclable waste, compostable waste, and miscellaneous waste that cannot undergo reuse and necessitates disposal in a landfill or incinerator.

Labeling is especially important when dealing with nuclear waste due to how much harm to human health the excess products of the nuclear cycle can cause.

== Hazards of waste management ==
There are multiple facets of waste management that all come with hazards, both for those around the disposal site and those who work within waste management. Exposure to waste of any kind can be detrimental to the health of the individual, primary conditions that worsen with exposure to waste are asthma and tuberculosis. The exposure to waste on an average individual is highly dependent on the conditions around them, those in less developed or lower income areas are more susceptible to the effects of waste product, especially through chemical waste. The range of hazards due to waste is extremely large and covers every type of waste, not only chemical. There are many different guidelines to follow for disposing different types of waste.

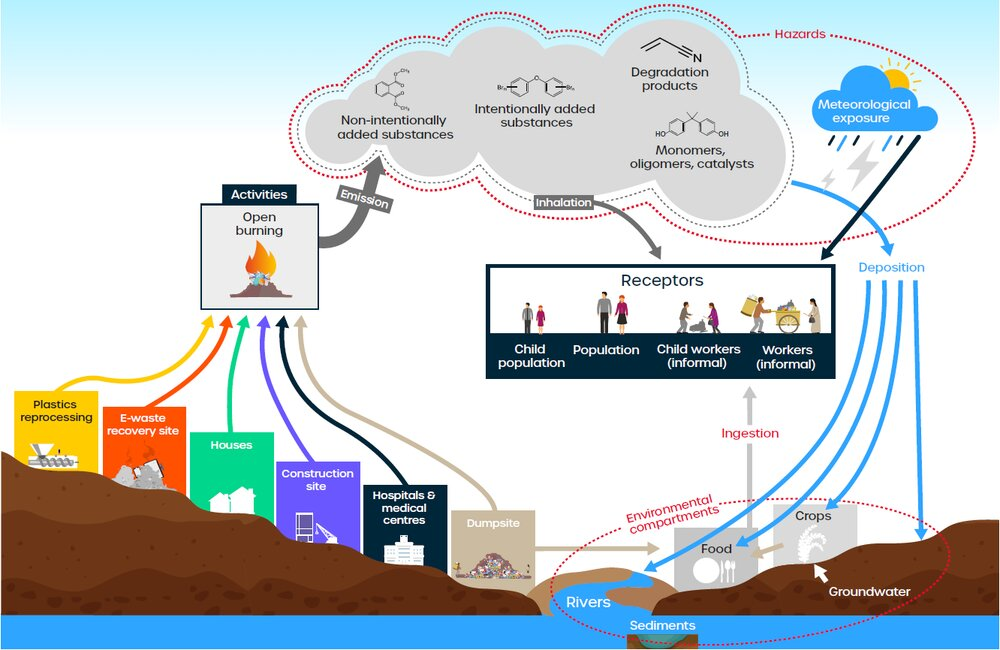
Diagram showing the multiple ways that incineration is hazardous to the population.

The hazards of incineration are a large risk to many variable communities, including underdeveloped countries and countries or cities with little space for landfills or alternatives. Burning waste is an easily accessible option for many people around the globe, it has even been encouraged by the World Health Organization when there is no other option. Because burning waste is rarely paid attention to, its effects go unnoticed. The release of hazardous materials and CO_{2} when waste is burned is the largest hazard with incineration.

== Financial models ==
In most developed countries, domestic waste disposal is funded from a national or local tax which may be related to income, or property values. Commercial and industrial waste disposal is typically charged for as a commercial service, often as an integrated charge which includes disposal costs. This practice may encourage disposal contractors to opt for the cheapest disposal option such as landfill rather than the environmentally best solution such as reuse and recycling.

Financing solid waste management projects can be overwhelming for the city government, especially if the government see it as an important service they should render to the citizen. Donors and grants are a funding mechanism that is dependent on the interest of the donor organization. As much as it is a good way to develop a city's waste management infrastructure, attracting and utilizing grants is solely reliant on what the donor considers important. Therefore, it may be a challenge for a city government to dictate how the funds should be distributed among the various aspect of waste management.

An example of a country that enforces a waste tax is Italy. The tax is based on two rates: fixed and variable. The fixed rate is based on the size of the house while the variable is determined by the number of people living in the house.

The World Bank finances and advises on solid waste management projects using a diverse suite of products and services, including traditional loans, results-based financing, development policy financing, and technical advisory. World Bank-financed waste management projects usually address the entire lifecycle of waste right from the point of generation to collection and transportation, and finally treatment and disposal.

== Disposal methods ==
=== Landfill ===
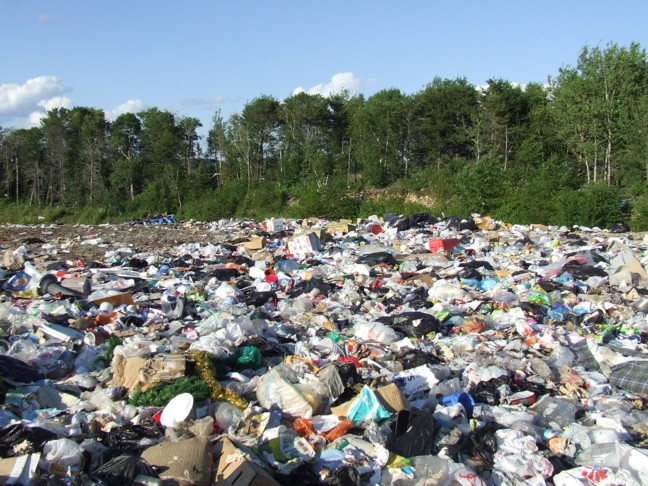
One of several landfills used by Dryden, Ontario, Canada

A landfill (Note: Also known as a tip, dump, rubbish tip, rubbish dump, garbage dump, trash dump, dumpsite, or dumping ground.) is a site for the disposal of waste materials, including municipal solid waste. It is the oldest and most common form of waste disposal, although the systematic burial of waste with daily, intermediate, and final covers only began in the 1940s. In the past, waste was simply left in piles or thrown into pits (known in archeology as middens).

Landfills take up significant amounts of land and pose environmental risks. Some landfill sites are used for waste management purposes, such as temporary storage, consolidation, and transfer, or for various stages of processing waste material, such as sorting, treatment, or recycling. Unless they are stabilized, landfills may undergo severe shaking or soil liquefaction during an earthquake. Once full, the area over a landfill site may be reclaimed for other uses.

Both active and restored landfill sites can have significant environmental impacts which can persist for many years. These include the release of landfill gases that contribute to climate change and the discharge of liquid landfill leachates containing high concentrations of polluting materials.

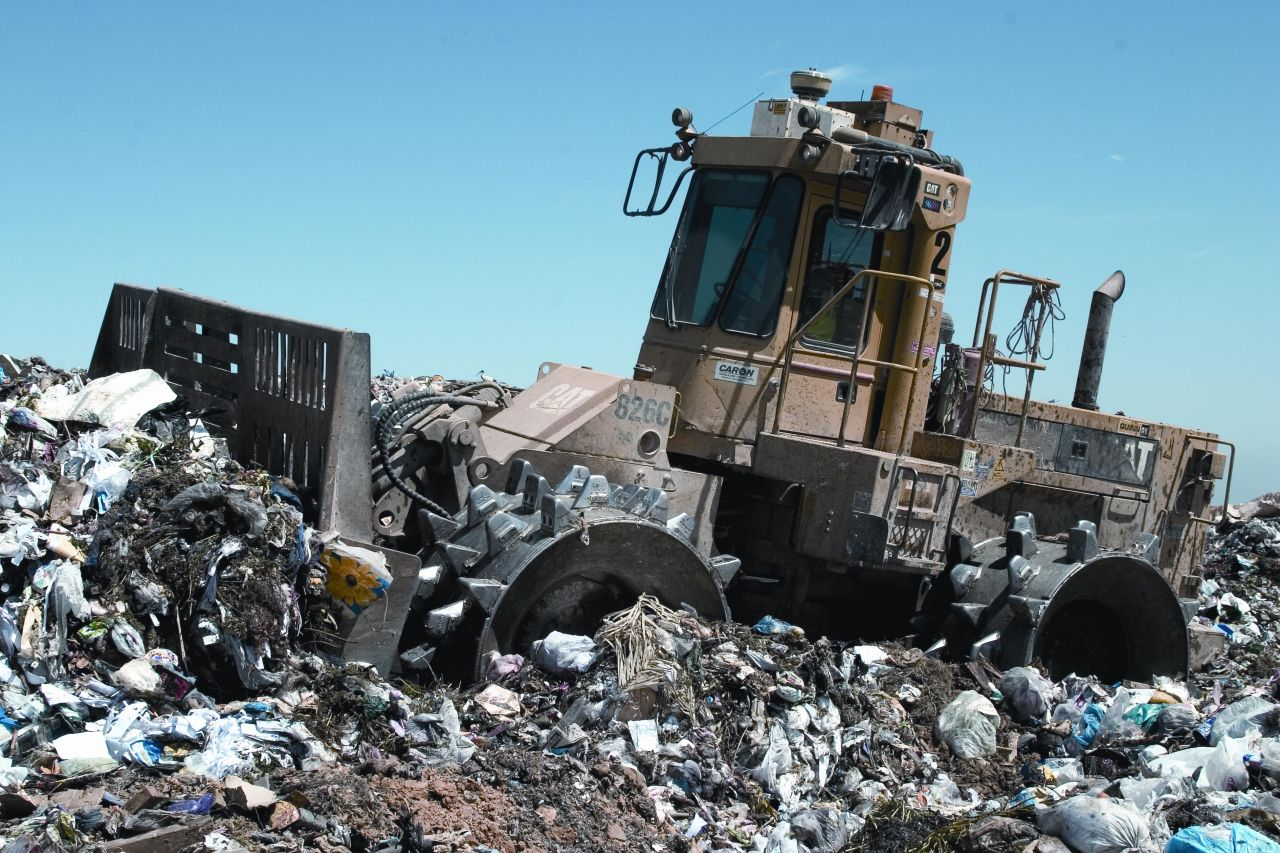
A landfill compaction vehicle in action.

=== Incineration ===
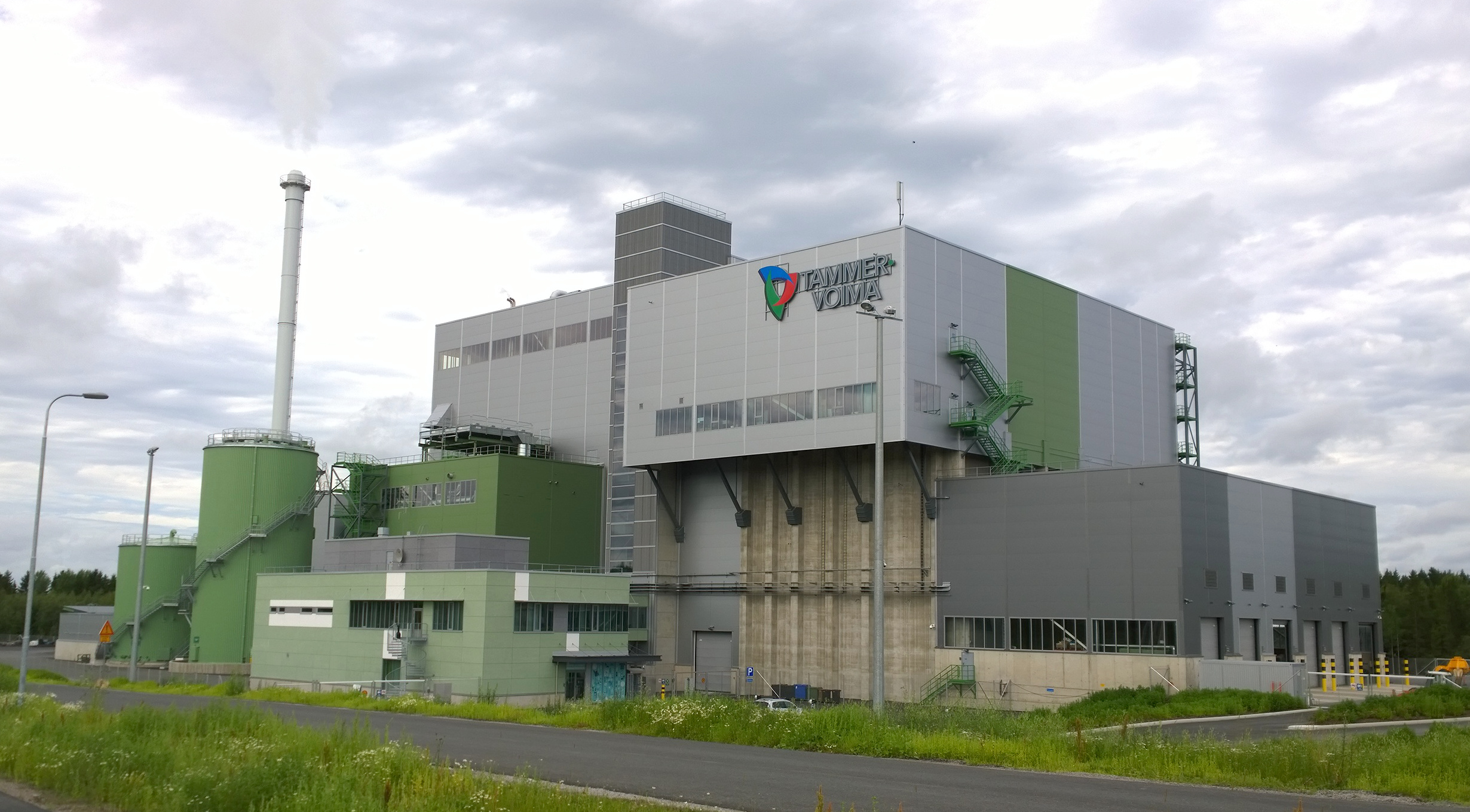
Tarastejärvi Incineration Plant in Tampere, Finland.

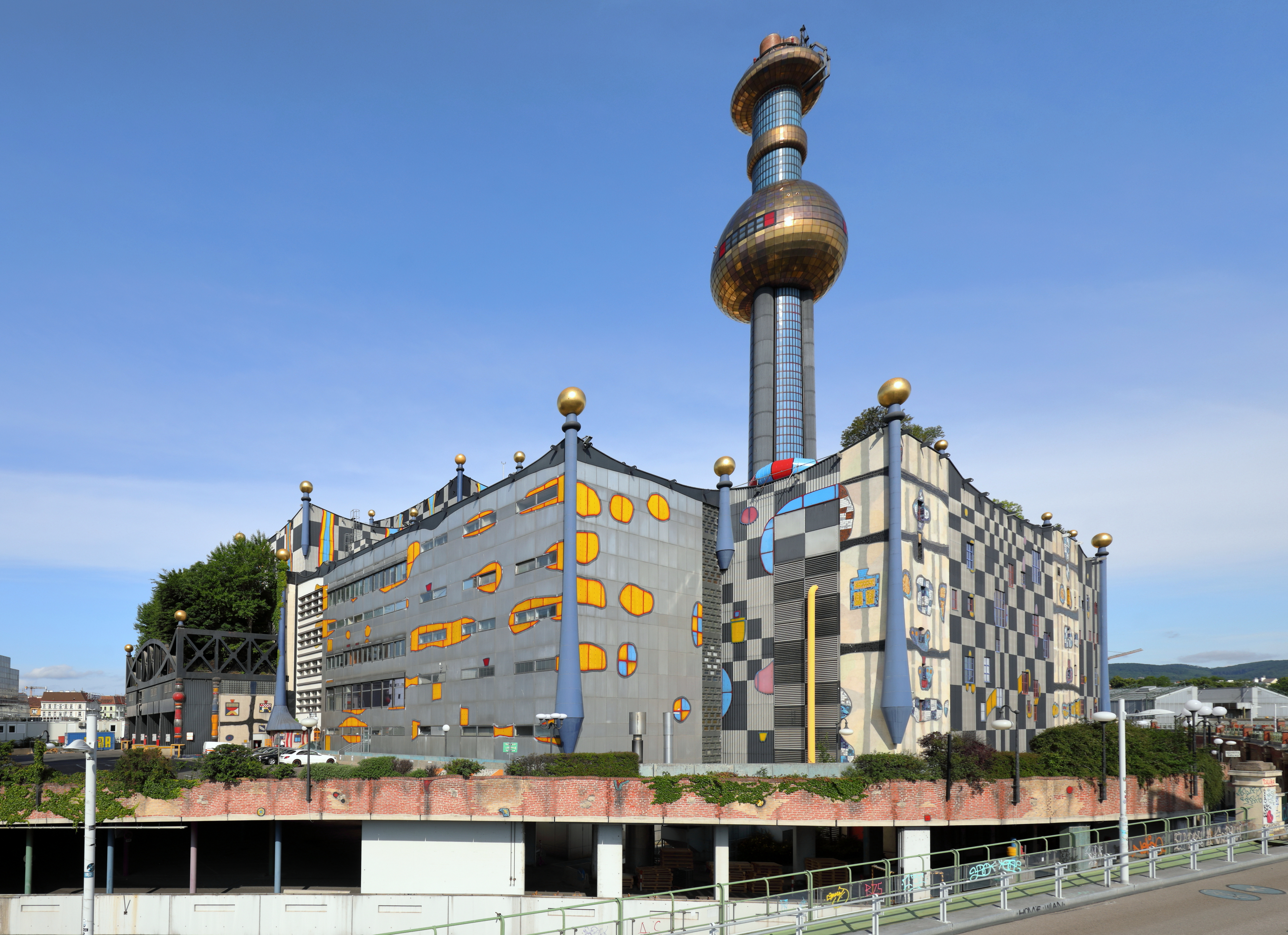
Spittelau incineration plant in Vienna

Incineration is a disposal method in which solid organic wastes are subjected to combustion so as to convert them into residue and gaseous products. This method is useful for the disposal of both municipal solid waste and solid residue from wastewater treatment. This process reduces the volume of solid waste by 80 to 95 percent. Incineration and other high-temperature waste treatment systems are sometimes described as "thermal treatment". Incinerators convert waste materials into heat, gas, steam, and ash.

Incineration is carried out both on a small scale by individuals and on a large scale by industry. It is used to dispose of solid, liquid, and gaseous waste. It is recognized as a practical method of disposing of certain hazardous waste materials (such as biological medical waste). Incineration is a controversial method of waste disposal, due to issues such as the emission of gaseous pollutants including substantial quantities of carbon dioxide.

Incineration is common in countries such as Japan where land is more scarce, as the facilities generally do not require as much area as landfills. Waste-to-energy (WtE) or energy-from-waste (EfW) are broad terms for facilities that burn waste in a furnace or boiler to generate heat, steam, or electricity. Combustion in an incinerator is not always perfect and there have been concerns about pollutants in gaseous emissions from incinerator stacks. Particular concern has focused on some very persistent organic compounds such as dioxins, furans, and PAHs, which may be created and which may have serious environmental consequences and some heavy metals such as mercury and lead which can be volatilised in the combustion process.

== Recycling ==
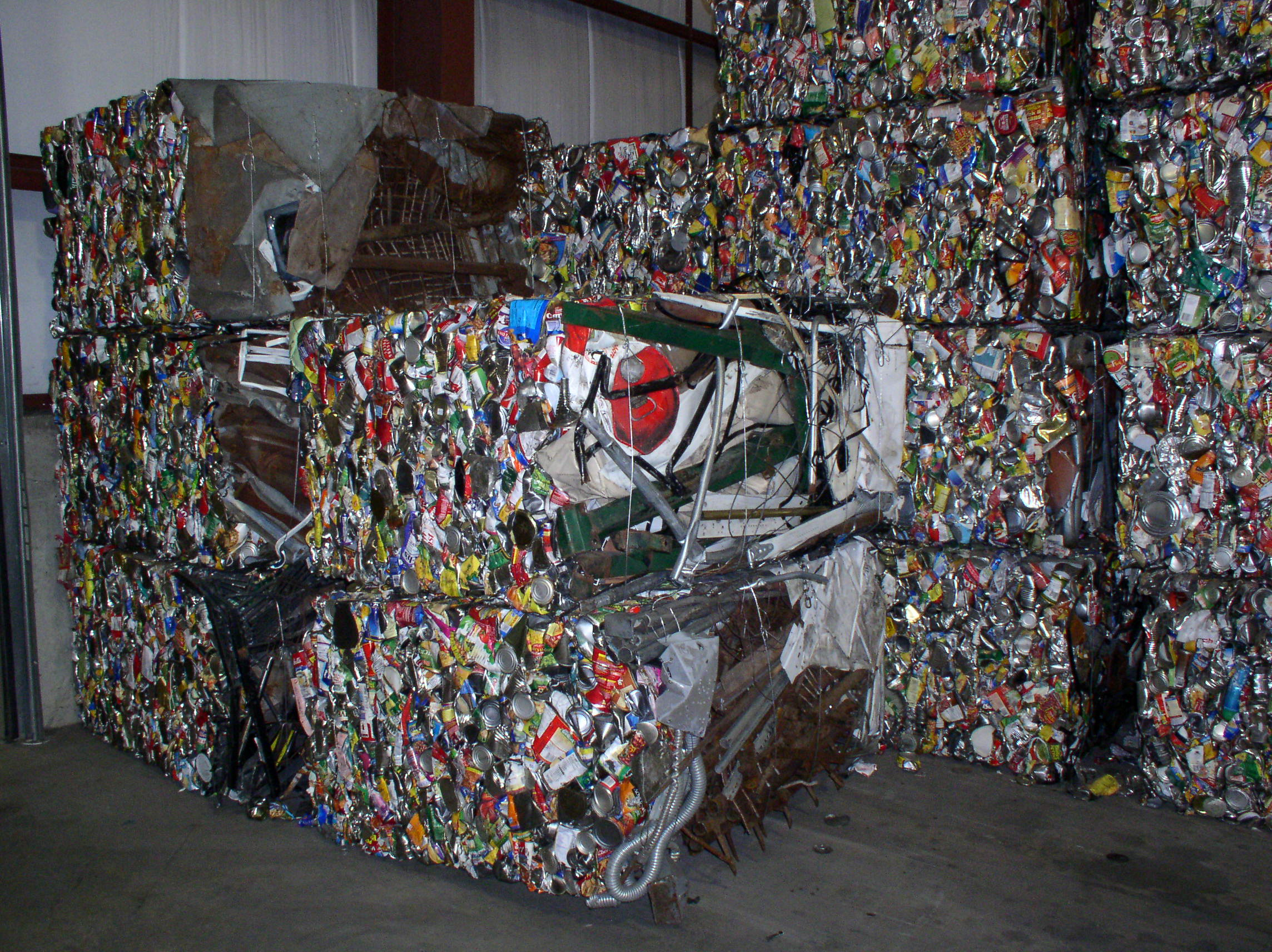
Steel crushed and baled for recycling

Recycling is a resource recovery practice that refers to the collection and reuse of waste materials such as empty beverage containers. This process involves breaking down and reusing materials that would otherwise be gotten rid of as trash. There are numerous benefits of recycling, and with so many new technologies making even more materials recyclable, it is possible to clean up the Earth. Recycling not only benefits the environment but also positively affects the economy. The materials from which the items are made can be made into new products. Materials for recycling may be collected separately from general waste using dedicated bins and collection vehicles, a procedure called kerbside collection. In some communities, the owner of the waste is required to separate the materials into different bins (e.g. for paper, plastics, metals) prior to its collection. In other communities, all recyclable materials are placed in a single bin for collection, and the sorting is handled later at a central facility. The latter method is known as "single-stream recycling".

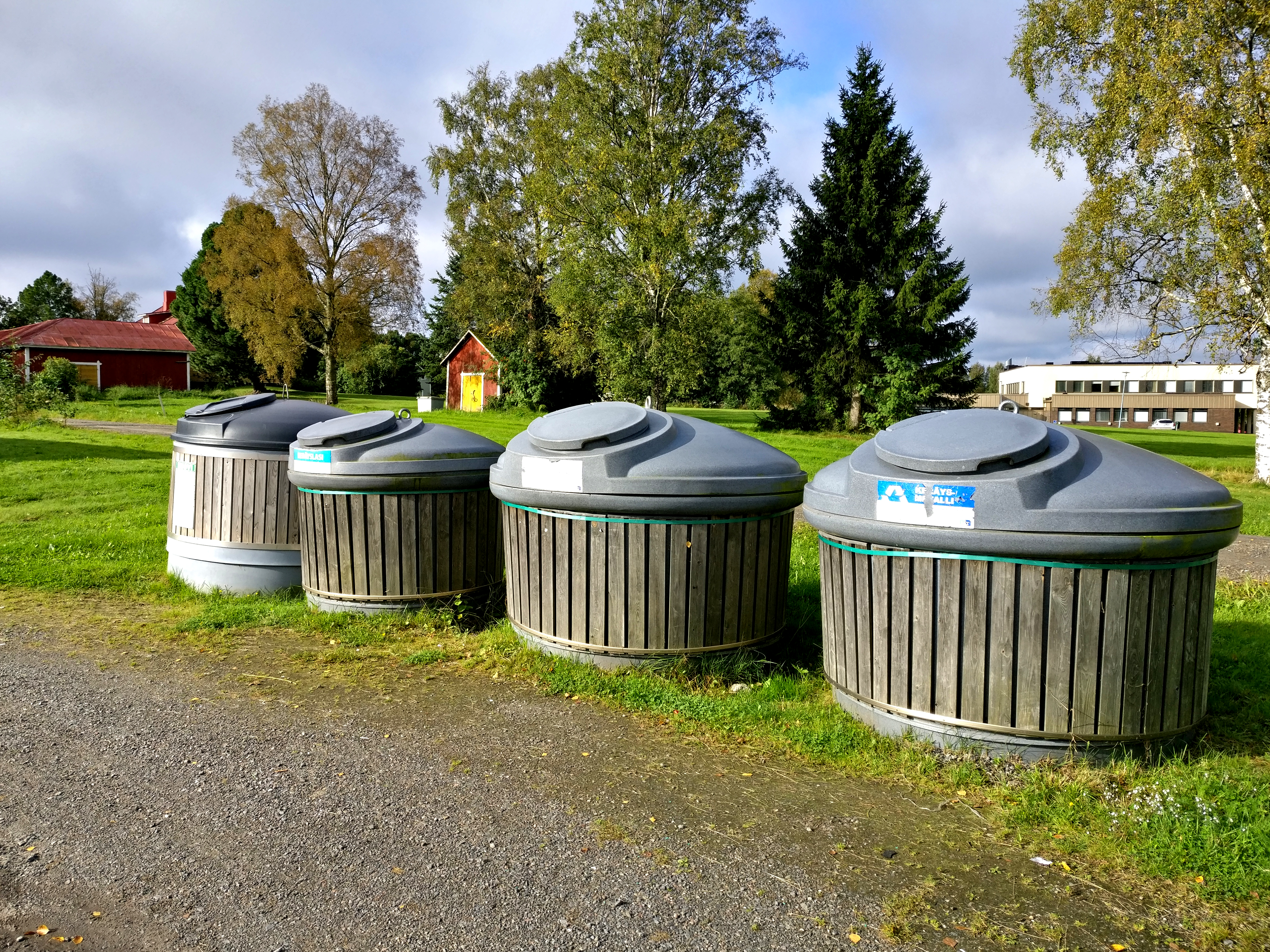
A recycling point in Lappajärvi, Finland

The most common consumer products recycled include aluminium such as beverage cans, copper such as wire, steel from food and aerosol cans, old steel furnishings or equipment, rubber tyres, polyethylene and PET bottles, glass bottles and jars, paperboard cartons, newspapers, magazines and light paper, and corrugated fiberboard boxes.

PVC, LDPE, PP, and PS (see resin identification code) are also recyclable. These items are usually composed of a single type of material, making them relatively easy to recycle into new products. The recycling of complex products (such as computers and electronic equipment) is more difficult, due to the additional dismantling and separation required.

The type of material accepted for recycling varies by city and country. Each city and country has different recycling programs in place that can handle the various types of recyclable materials. However, certain variation in acceptance is reflected in the resale value of the material once it is reprocessed. Some of the types of recycling include waste paper and cardboard, plastic recycling, metal recycling, electronic devices, wood recycling, glass recycling, cloth and textile and so many more. In July 2017, the Chinese government announced an import ban of 24 categories of recyclables and solid waste, including plastic, textiles and mixed paper, placing tremendous impact on developed countries globally, which exported directly or indirectly to China.

== Reuse ==
=== Biological reprocessing ===
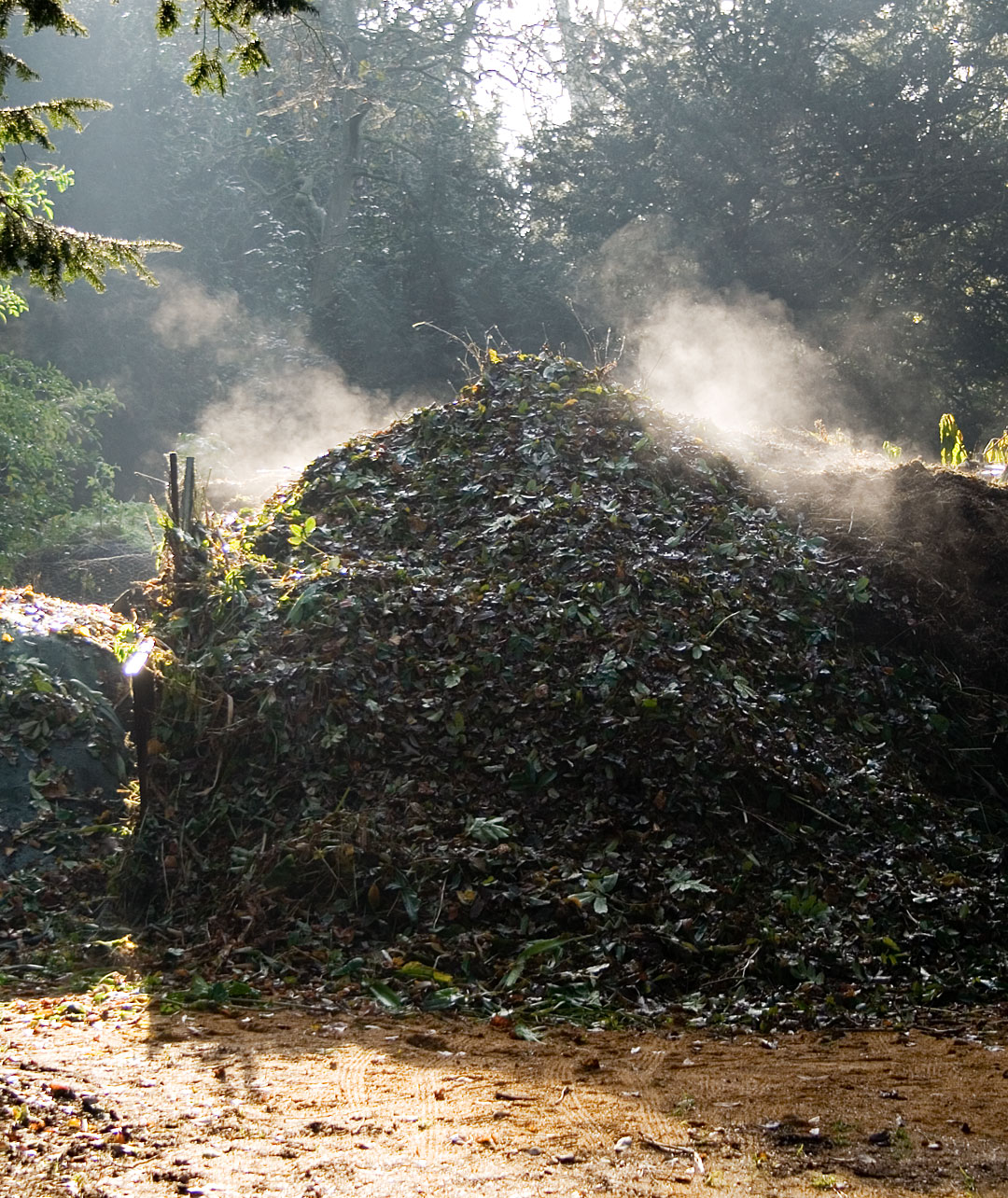
An active compost heap

Recoverable materials that are organic in nature, such as plant material, food scraps, and paper products, can be recovered through composting and digestion processes to decompose the organic matter. The resulting organic material is then recycled as mulch or compost for agricultural or landscaping purposes. In addition to microbial composting and digestion, certain insects such as black soldier fly larvae can biologically convert organic waste streams into biomass while reducing waste volume. Also, waste gas from the process (such as methane) can be captured and used for generating electricity and heat (CHP/cogeneration) maximising efficiencies. There are different types of composting and digestion methods and technologies. They vary in complexity from simple home compost heaps to large-scale industrial digestion of mixed domestic waste. The different methods of biological decomposition are classified as aerobic or anaerobic methods. Some methods use the hybrids of these two methods. The anaerobic digestion of the organic fraction of solid waste is more environmentally effective than landfill, or incineration. The intention of biological processing in waste management is to control and accelerate the natural process of decomposition of organic matter. (See resource recovery).

=== Energy recovery ===
Energy recovery from waste is the conversion of non-recyclable waste materials into usable heat, electricity, or fuel through a variety of processes, including combustion, gasification, pyrolyzation, anaerobic digestion, and landfill gas recovery. This process is often called waste-to-energy. Energy recovery from waste is part of the non-hazardous waste management hierarchy. Using energy recovery to convert non-recyclable waste materials into electricity and heat, generates a renewable energy source and can reduce carbon emissions by offsetting the need for energy from fossil sources as well as reduce methane generation from landfills. Globally, waste-to-energy accounts for 16% of waste management.

The energy content of waste products can be harnessed directly by using them as a direct combustion fuel, or indirectly by processing them into another type of fuel. Thermal treatment ranges from using waste as a fuel source for cooking or heating and the use of the gas fuel (see above) to using it as a fuel for boilers. Pyrolysis and gasification are two related forms of thermal treatment where waste materials are heated to high temperatures with limited oxygen availability. The process usually occurs in a sealed vessel under high pressure. Pyrolysis of solid waste converts the material into solid, liquid, and gas products. The liquid and gas can be burnt to produce energy or refined into other chemical products (chemical refinery). The solid residue (char) can be further refined into products such as activated carbon. Gasification and advanced Plasma arc gasification are used to convert organic materials directly into a synthetic gas (syngas) composed of carbon monoxide and hydrogen. The gas is then burnt to produce electricity and steam. An alternative to pyrolysis is supercritical water decomposition at a high-temperature and pressure (hydrothermal monophasic oxidation).

=== Pyrolysis ===
Pyrolysis is often used to convert many types of domestic and industrial residues into a recovered fuel. Different types of waste input (such as plant waste, food waste, tyres) placed in the pyrolysis process potentially yield an alternative to fossil fuels. Pyrolysis is a process of thermo-chemical decomposition of organic materials by heat in the absence of stoichiometric quantities of oxygen; the decomposition produces various hydrocarbon gases. During pyrolysis, the molecules of an object vibrate at high frequencies to the extent that molecules start breaking down. The rate of pyrolysis increases with temperature. In industrial applications, temperatures are above 430 °C (800 °F).

Slow pyrolysis produces gases and solid charcoal. Pyrolysis holds promise for conversion of waste biomass into useful liquid fuel. Pyrolysis of waste wood and plastics can potentially produce fuel. The solids left from pyrolysis contain metals, glass, sand, and pyrolysis coke which does not convert to gas. Compared to the process of incineration, certain types of pyrolysis processes release less harmful by-products that contain alkali metals, sulphur, and chlorine. However, pyrolysis of some waste yields gases which impact the environment such as HCl and SO_{2}.

=== Resource recovery ===
Resource recovery is the systematic diversion of waste, which was intended for disposal, for a specific next use. It is the processing of recyclables to extract or recover materials and resources, or convert to energy. These activities are performed at a resource recovery facility. Resource recovery is not only environmentally important, but it is also cost-effective. It decreases the amount of waste for disposal, saves space in landfills, and conserves natural resources.

Resource recovery, an alternative approach to traditional waste management, utilizes life cycle analysis (LCA) to evaluate and optimize waste handling strategies. Comprehensive studies focusing on mixed municipal solid waste (MSW) have identified a preferred pathway for maximizing resource efficiency and minimizing environmental impact, including effective waste administration and management, source separation of waste materials, efficient collection systems, reuse and recycling of non-organic fractions, and processing of organic material through anaerobic digestion.

In 2025, a study was conducted on 91 field-based studies carried out in 29 countries. It examined the environmental impacts of various methods of food waste management. It was discovered that composting, anaerobic digestion, and feeding the food waste to animals emitted less greenhouse gas emissions by about one tonne of CO2e for each tonne of food waste compared to when the food waste is buried. Wang, Yingcheng; Ying, Hao; Stefanovski, Darko; Shurson, Gerald C.; Chen, Ting; Wang, Zihan; Yin, Yulong; Zheng, Huifang; Nakaishi, Tomoaki; Li, Ji; Cui, Zhenling; Dou, Zhengxia (2025). "Food waste used as a resource can reduce climate and resource burdens in agrifood systems". Nature Food. 6 (5): 478–490. doi:10.1038/s43016-025-01140-z.

As an example of how resource recycling can be beneficial, many items thrown away contain metals that can be recycled to create a profit, such as the components in circuit boards. Wood chippings in pallets and other packaging materials can be recycled into useful products for horticulture. The recycled chips can cover paths, walkways, or arena surfaces.

Application of rational and consistent waste management practices can yield a range of benefits including:

1. Economic – Improving economic efficiency through the means of resource use, treatment, and disposal and creating markets for recycles can lead to efficient practices in the production and consumption of products and materials resulting in valuable materials being recovered for reuse and the potential for new jobs and new business opportunities.
2. Social – By reducing adverse impacts on health through proper waste management practices, the resulting consequences are more appealing to civic communities. Better social advantages can lead to new sources of employment and potentially lift communities out of poverty, especially in some of the developing poorer countries and cities.
3. Environmental – Reducing or eliminating adverse impacts on the environment through reducing, reusing, recycling, and minimizing resource extraction can result in improved air and water quality and help in the reduction of greenhouse gas emissions.
4. Inter-generational Equity – Following effective waste management practices can provide subsequent generations a more robust economy, a fairer and more inclusive society and a cleaner environment.

=== Waste valorization ===
Waste valorization, beneficial reuse, value recovery or waste reclamation is the process of waste products or residues from an economic process being valorized (given economic value), by reuse or recycling in order to create economically useful materials. The term comes from practices in sustainable manufacturing and economics, industrial ecology and waste management. The term is usually applied in industrial processes where residue from creating or processing one good is used as a raw material or energy feedstock for another industrial process. Industrial wastes in particular are good candidates for valorization because they tend to be more consistent and predictable than other waste, such as household waste.

Increased regulation of residual materials and socioeconomic changes, such as the introduction of ideas about sustainable development and circular economy in the 1990s and 2000s increased focus on industrial practices to recover resources as value add materials.

== Liquid waste-management ==
Liquid waste is an important category of waste management because it is so difficult to deal with. Unlike solid wastes, liquid wastes cannot be easily picked up and removed from an environment. Liquid wastes spread out, and easily pollute other sources of liquid if brought into contact. This type of waste also soaks into objects like soil and groundwater. This in turn carries over to pollute the plants, the animals in the ecosystem, as well as the humans within the area of the pollution.

=== Industrial wastewater ===
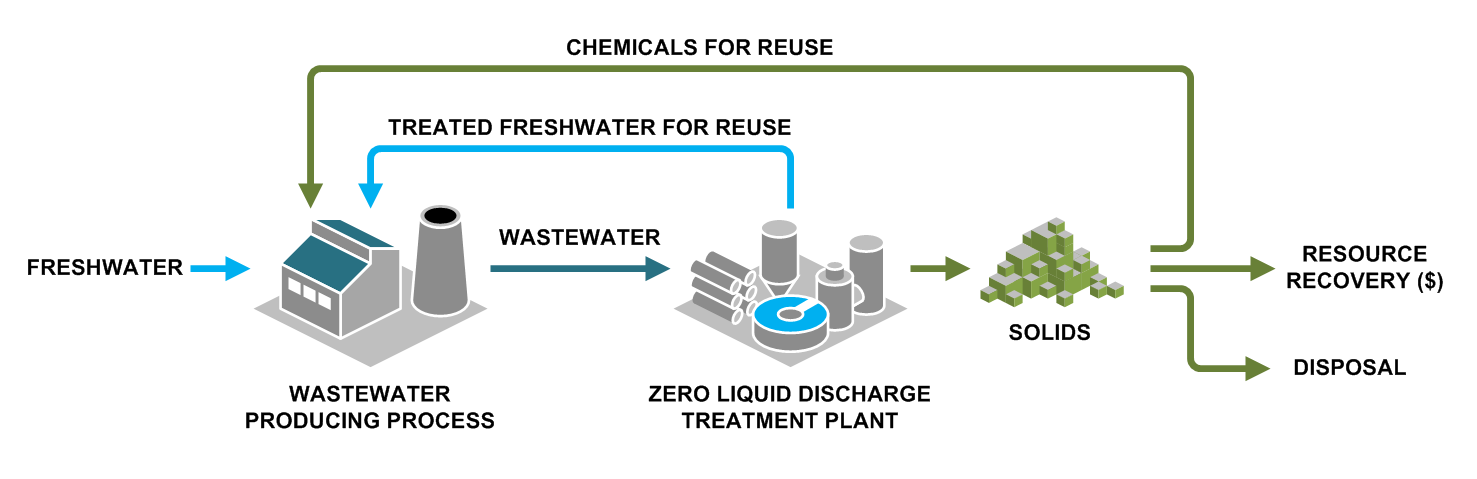
Wastewater from an industrial process can be converted at a treatment plant to solids and treated water for reuse.

Industrial wastewater treatment describes the processes used for treating wastewater that is produced by industries as an undesirable by-product. After treatment, the treated industrial wastewater (or effluent) may be reused or released to a sanitary sewer or to a surface water in the environment. Some industrial facilities generate wastewater that can be treated in sewage treatment plants. Most industrial processes, such as petroleum refineries, chemical and petrochemical plants have their own specialized facilities to treat their wastewaters so that the pollutant concentrations in the treated wastewater comply with the regulations regarding disposal of wastewaters into sewers or into rivers, lakes or oceans. This applies to industries that generate wastewater with high concentrations of organic matter (e.g. oil and grease), toxic pollutants (e.g. heavy metals, volatile organic compounds) or nutrients such as ammonia. Some industries install a pre-treatment system to remove some pollutants (e.g., toxic compounds), and then discharge the partially treated wastewater to the municipal sewer system.

Most industries produce some wastewater. Recent trends have been to minimize such production or to recycle treated wastewater within the production process. Some industries have been successful at redesigning their manufacturing processes to reduce or eliminate pollutants. Sources of industrial wastewater include battery manufacturing, chemical manufacturing, electric power plants, food industry, iron and steel industry, metal working, mines and quarries, nuclear industry, oil and gas extraction, petroleum refining and petrochemicals, pharmaceutical manufacturing, pulp and paper industry, smelters, textile mills, industrial oil contamination, water treatment and wood preserving. Treatment processes include brine treatment, solids removal (e.g. chemical precipitation, filtration), oils and grease removal, removal of biodegradable organics, removal of other organics, removal of acids and alkalis, and removal of toxic materials.

=== Sewage sludge treatment ===
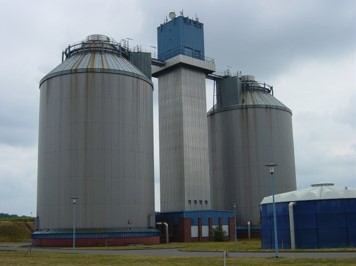
Sludge treatment in anaerobic digesters at a sewage treatment plant in Cottbus, Germany

Sewage sludge treatment describes the processes used to manage and dispose of sewage sludge produced during sewage treatment. Sludge treatment is focused on reducing sludge weight and volume to reduce transportation and disposal costs, and on reducing potential health risks of disposal options. Water removal is the primary means of weight and volume reduction, while pathogen destruction is frequently accomplished through heating during thermophilic digestion, composting, or incineration. The choice of a sludge treatment method depends on the volume of sludge generated, and comparison of treatment costs required for available disposal options. Air-drying and composting may be attractive to rural communities, while limited land availability may make aerobic digestion and mechanical dewatering preferable for cities, and economies of scale may encourage energy recovery alternatives in metropolitan areas.

Sludge is mostly water with some amounts of solid material removed from liquid sewage. Primary sludge includes settleable solids removed during primary treatment in primary clarifiers. Secondary sludge is sludge separated in secondary clarifiers that are used in secondary treatment bioreactors or processes using inorganic oxidizing agents. In intensive sewage treatment processes, the sludge produced needs to be removed from the liquid line on a continuous basis because the volumes of the tanks in the liquid line have insufficient volume to store sludge. This is done in order to keep the treatment processes compact and in balance (production of sludge approximately equal to the removal of sludge). The sludge removed from the liquid line goes to the sludge treatment line. Aerobic processes (such as the activated sludge process) tend to produce more sludge compared with anaerobic processes. On the other hand, in extensive (natural) treatment processes, such as ponds and constructed wetlands, the produced sludge remains accumulated in the treatment units (liquid line) and is only removed after several years of operation.

Sludge treatment options depend on the amount of solids generated and other site-specific conditions. Composting is most often applied to small-scale plants with aerobic digestion for mid-sized operations, and anaerobic digestion for the larger-scale operations. The sludge is sometimes passed through a so-called pre-thickener which de-waters the sludge. Types of pre-thickeners include centrifugal sludge thickeners, rotary drum sludge thickeners and belt filter presses. Dewatered sludge may be incinerated or transported offsite for disposal in a landfill or use as an agricultural soil amendment.

Energy may be recovered from sludge through methane gas production during anaerobic digestion or through incineration of dried sludge, but energy yield is often insufficient to evaporate sludge water content or to power blowers, pumps, or centrifuges required for dewatering. Coarse primary solids and secondary sewage sludge may include toxic chemicals removed from liquid sewage by sorption onto solid particles in clarifier sludge. Reducing sludge volume may increase the concentration of some of these toxic chemicals in the sludge.

== Avoidance and reduction methods ==
An important method of waste management is the prevention of waste material being created, also known as waste reduction. Waste minimization is reducing the quantity of hazardous wastes achieved through a thorough application of innovative or alternative procedures. Methods of avoidance include reuse of second-hand products, repairing broken items instead of buying new ones, designing products to be refillable or reusable (such as cotton instead of plastic shopping bags), encouraging consumers to avoid using disposable products (such as disposable cutlery), removing any food/liquid remains from cans and packaging, and designing products that use less material to achieve the same purpose (for example, lightweighting of beverage cans).

== International waste trade ==
The global waste trade is the international trade of waste between countries for further treatment, disposal, or recycling. Toxic or hazardous wastes are often imported by developing countries from developed countries.

The World Bank Report What a Waste: A Global Review of Solid Waste Management, describes the amount of solid waste produced in a given country. Specifically, countries which produce more solid waste are more economically developed and more industrialized. The report explains that "Generally, the higher the economic development and rate of urbanization, the greater the amount of solid waste produced." Therefore, countries in the Global North, which are more economically developed and urbanized, produce more solid waste than Global South countries.

Current international trade flows of waste follow a pattern of waste being produced in the Global North and being exported to and disposed of in the Global South. Multiple factors affect which countries produce waste and at what magnitude, including geographic location, degree of industrialization, and level of integration into the global economy.

Numerous scholars and researchers have linked the sharp increase in waste trading and the negative impacts of waste trading to the prevalence of neoliberal economic policy. With the major economic transition towards neoliberal economic policy in the 1980s, the shift towards "free-market" policy has facilitated the sharp increase in the global waste trade.

Specifically, developing countries have been targeted by trade liberalization policies to import waste as a means of economic expansion. The guiding neoliberal economic policy argues that the way to be integrated into the global economy is to participate in trade liberalization and exchange in international trade markets. Their claim is that smaller countries, with less infrastructure, less wealth, and less manufacturing ability, should take in hazardous wastes as a way to increase profits and stimulate their economies.

== Challenges in developing countries ==
Areas with developing economies often experience exhausted waste collection services and inadequately managed and uncontrolled dumpsites. The problems are worsening. Problems with governance complicate the situation. Waste management in these countries and cities is an ongoing challenge due to weak institutions, chronic under-resourcing, and rapid urbanization. All of these challenges, along with the lack of understanding of different factors that contribute to the hierarchy of waste management, affect the treatment of waste.

In developing countries, waste management activities are usually carried out by the poor, for their survival. It has been estimated that 2% of the population in Asia, Latin America, and Africa are dependent on waste for their livelihood. Family organized, or individual manual scavengers are often involved with waste management practices with very little supportive network and facilities with increased risk of health effects. Additionally, this practice prevents their children from further education. The participation level of most citizens in waste management is very low, residents in urban areas are not actively involved in the process of waste management.

== Technologies ==
Traditionally, the waste management industry has been a late adopter of new technologies such as RFID (Radio Frequency Identification) tags, GPS and integrated software packages which enable better quality data to be collected without the use of estimation or manual data entry. This technology has been used widely by many organizations in some industrialized countries. Radiofrequency identification is a tagging system for automatic identification of recyclable components of municipal solid waste streams.

Smart waste management has been implemented in several cities, including San Francisco, Varde or Madrid. Waste containers are equipped with level sensors. When the container is almost full, the sensor warns the pickup truck, which can thus trace its route servicing the fullest containers and skipping the emptiest ones.

== Statistics and trends ==
The "Global Waste Management Outlook 2024," supported by the Environment Fund - UNEP's core financial fund, and jointly published with the International Solid Waste Association (ISWA), provides a comprehensive update on the trajectory of global waste generation and the escalating costs of waste management since 2018. The report predicts municipal solid waste to rise from 2.3 billion tonnes in 2023 to 3.8 billion tonnes by 2050. The direct global cost of waste management was around US$252 billion in 2020, which could soar to US$640.3 billion annually by 2050 if current practices continue without reform. Incorporating life cycle assessments, the report contrasts scenarios from maintaining the status quo to fully adopting zero waste and circular economy principles. It indicates that effective waste prevention and management could cap annual costs at US$270.2 billion by 2050, while a circular economy approach could transform the sector into a net positive, offering a potential annual gain of US$108.5 billion. To prevent the direct outcomes, the report calls for immediate action across multiple sectors, including development banks, governments, municipalities, producers, retailers, and citizens, providing targeted strategies for waste reduction and improved management practices.

Waste generated by country, 2020
Country or territory	GDP (USD)	Population	Total waste generated (tonnes)	Share of population living in urban areas	Waste generated per capita (kg)
Afghanistan	2,057	34,656,032	5,628,525	26%	162
Albania	13,724	2,854,191	1,087,447	62%	381
Algeria	11,826	40,606,052	12,378,740	74%	305
American Samoa	11,113	55,599	18,989	87%	342
Andorra	43,712	82,431	43,000	88%	522
Angola	8,037	25,096,150	4,213,644	67%	168
Antigua and Barbuda	17,966	96,777	30,585	24%	316
Argentina	23,550	42,981,516	17,910,550	92%	417
Armenia	11,020	2,906,220	492,800	63%	170
Aruba	35,563	103,187	88,132	44%	854
Australia	47,784	23,789,338	13,345,000	86%	561
Austria	56,030	8,877,067	5,219,716	59%	588
Azerbaijan	14,854	9,649,341	2,930,349	56%	304
Bahamas	35,400	386,838	264,000	83%	682
Bahrain	47,938	1,425,171	951,943	90%	668
Bangladesh	3,196	155,727,056	14,778,497	38%	95
Barbados	15,445	280,601	174,815	31%	623
Belarus	18,308	9,489,616	4,280,000	79%	451
Belgium	51,915	11,484,055	4,765,883	98%	415
Belize	7,259	359,288	101,379	46%	282
Benin	2,227	5,521,763	685,936	48%	124
Bermuda	80,982	64,798	82,000	100%	1,265
Bhutan	6,743	686,958	111,314	42%	162
Bolivia	7,984	10,724,705	2,219,052	70%	207
Bosnia and Herzegovina	12,671	3,535,961	1,248,718	49%	353
Botswana	14,126	2,014,866	210,854	71%	105
Brazil	14,596	208,494,896	79,069,584	87%	379
Brunei	60,866	423,196	216,253	78%	511
Bulgaria	22,279	7,025,037	2,859,190	76%	407
Burkina Faso	1,925	18,110,624	2,575,251	31%	142
Burundi	840	6,741,569	1,872,016	14%	278
Cambodia	3,364	15,270,790	1,089,000	24%	71
Cameroon	3,263	21,655,716	3,270,617	58%	151
Canada	47,672	35,544,564	25,103,034	82%	706
Cape Verde	6,354	513,979	132,555	67%	258
Cayman Islands	66,207	59,172	60,000	100%	1,014
Central African Republic	823	4,515,392	1,105,983	42%	245
Chad	1,733	11,887,202	1,358,851	24%	114
Channel Islands	46,673	164,541	178,933	31%	1,087
Chile	20,362	16,829,442	6,517,000	88%	387
China	16,092	1,400,050,048	395,081,376	61%	282
Colombia	12,523	46,406,648	12,150,120	81%	262
Comoros	2,960	777,424	91,013	29%	117
Democratic Republic of the Congo	1,056	78,736,152	14,385,226	46%	183
Republic of the Congo	4,900	2,648,507	451,200	68%	170
Costa Rica	18,169	4,757,575	1,460,000	81%	307
Croatia	28,829	4,067,500	1,810,038	58%	445
Cuba	12,985	11,303,687	2,692,692	77%	238
Curaçao	27,504	153,822	24,704	89	161
Cyprus	39,545	1,198,575	769,485	67%	642
Denmark	57,821	5,818,553	4,910,859	88%	844
Djibouti	6,597	746,221	114,997	78%	154
Dominica	11,709	72,400	13,176	71%	182
Dominican Republic	15,328	10,528,394	4,063,910	83%	386
Ecuador	11,896	16,144,368	5,297,211	64%	328
Egypt	10,301	87,813,256	21,000,000	43%	239
El Salvador	7,329	6,164,626	1,648,996	73%	267
Equatorial Guinea	24,827	1,221,490	198,443	73%	162
Eritrea	1,715	4,474,690	726,957	41%	162
Estonia	36,956	1,326,590	489,512	69%	369
Eswatini	8,321	1,343,098	218,199	24%	162
Ethiopia	1,779	99,873,032	6,532,787	22%	65
Faroe Islands	44,403	48,842	61,000	42%	1,249
Fiji	10,788	867,086	189,390	57%	218
Finland	48,814	5,520,314	3,124,498	86%	566
France	46,110	67,059,888	36,748,820	81%	548
French Polynesia	60,956	273,528	147,000	62%	537
Gabon	18,515	1,086,137	238,102	90%	219
Gambia	2,181	1,311,349	193,441	63%	148
Georgia	12,605	3,717,100	800,000	59%	215
Germany	53,785	83,132,800	50,627,876	77%	609
Ghana	3,093	21,542,008	3,538,275	57%	164
Gibraltar	43,712	33,623	16,954	100%	504
Greece	30,465	10,716,322	5,615,353	80%	524
Greenland	43,949	56,905	50,000	87%	879
Grenada	13,208	105,481	29,536	37%	280
Guam	59,075	159,973	141,500	95%	885
Guatemala	8,125	16,252,429	2,756,741	52%	170
Guinea	1,623	8,132,552	596,911	37%	73
Guinea-Bissau	1,800	1,770,526	289,514	44%	164
Guyana	9,812	746,556	179,252	27%	240
Haiti	2,953	10,847,334	2,309,852	57%	213
Honduras	5,396	9,112,867	2,162,028	58%	237
Hong Kong	57,216	7,305,700	5,679,816	100%	777
Hungary	32,643	9,769,949	3,780,970	72%	387
Iceland	55,274	343,400	225,270	94%	656
India	6,497	1,352,617,344	189,750,000	35%	140
Indonesia	10,531	261,115,456	65,200,000	57%	250
Iran	14,536	80,277,424	17,885,000	76%	223
Iraq	10,311	36,115,648	13,140,000	71%	364
Ireland	83,389	4,867,316	2,910,655	64%	598
Isle of Man	44,204	80,759	50,551	53%	626
Israel	37,688	8,380,100	5,400,000	93%	644
Italy	42,420	60,297,396	30,088,400	71%	499
Ivory Coast	3,661	20,401,332	4,440,814	52%	218
Jamaica	9,551	2,881,355	1,051,695	56%	365
Japan	41,310	126,529,104	42,720,000	92%	338
Jordan	10,413	8,413,464	2,529,997	91%	301
Kazakhstan	22,703	16,791,424	4,659,740	58%	278
Kenya	3,330	41,350,152	5,595,099	28%	135
Kiribati	2,250	114,395	35,724	56%	312
Kuwait	58,810	2,998,083	1,750,000	100%	584
Kyrgyzstan	4,805	5,956,900	1,113,300	37%	187
Laos	6,544	6,663,967	351,900	36%	53
Latvia	30,982	1,912,789	839,714	68%	439
Lebanon	16,967	5,603,279	2,040,000	89%	364
Lesotho	1,979	1,965,662	73,457	29%	37
Liberia	1,333	3,512,932	564,467	52%	161
Libya	8,480	6,193,501	2,147,596	81%	347
Liechtenstein	45,727	36,545	32,382	14%	886
Lithuania	37,278	2,786,844	1,315,390	68%	472
Luxembourg	114,323	619,896	490,338	91%	791
Macau	117,336	612,167	377,942	100%	617
Madagascar	1,566	24,894,552	3,768,759	39%	151
Malawi	999	16,577,147	1,297,844	17%	78
Malaysia	23,906	30,228,016	12,982,685	77%	429
Maldives	17,285	409,163	211,506	41%	517
Mali	2,008	16,006,670	1,937,354	44%	121
Malta	43,708	502,653	348,841	95%	694
Marshall Islands	3,629	52,793	8,614	78%	163
Mauritania	4,784	3,506,288	454,000	55%	129
Mauritius	20,647	1,263,473	438,000	41%	347
Mexico	19,332	125,890,952	53,100,000	81%	422
Federated States of Micronesia	3,440	104,937	26,040	23%	248
Moldova	10,361	3,554,108	3,981,200	43%	1,120
Monaco	43,712	37,783	46,000	100%	1,217
Morocco	6,915	34,318,080	6,852,000	64%	200
Mongolia	10,940	3,027,398	2,900,000	69%	958
Montenegro	20,753	622,227	329,780	67%	530
Mozambique	1,217	27,212,382	2,500,000	37%	92
Myanmar	1,094	46,095,464	4,677,307	31%	101
Namibia	6,153	1,559,983	256,729	52%	165
Nauru	11,167	13,049	6,192	100%	475
Nepal	2,902	28,982,772	1,768,977	21%	61
Netherlands	56,849	17,332,850	8,805,088	92%	508
New Caledonia	57,330	278,000	108,157	72%	389
New Zealand	41,857	4,692,700	3,405,000	87%	726
Nicaragua	4,612	5,737,723	1,528,816	59%	266
Niger	1,038	8,842,415	1,865,646	17%	211
Nigeria	4,690	154,402,176	27,614,830	52%	179
North Macedonia	16,148	2,082,958	626,970	58%	301
Northern Mariana Islands	60,956	54,036	32,761	92%	606
Norway	64,962	5,347,896	4,149,967	83%	776
Oman	30,536	3,960,925	1,734,885	86%	438
Pakistan	4,571	193,203,472	30,760,000	37%	159
Palau	18,275	21,503	9,427	81%	438
Palestine	5,986	4,046,901	1,387,000	77%	343
Panama	28,436	3,969,249	1,472,262	68%	371
Papua New Guinea	3,912	7,755,785	1,000,000	13%	129
Paraguay	11,810	6,639,119	1,818,501	62%	274
Peru	11,877	30,973,354	8,356,711	78%	270
Philippines	7,705	103,320,224	14,631,923	47%	142
Poland	33,222	37,970,872	12,758,213	60%	336
Portugal	34,962	10,269,417	5,268,211	66%	513
Puerto Rico	34,311	3,473,181	4,170,953	94%	1,201
Qatar	96,262	2,109,568	1,000,990	99%	475
Romania	29,984	19,356,544	5,419,833	54%	280
Russia	26,013	143,201,680	60,000,000	75%	419
Rwanda	1,951	11,917,508	4,384,969	17%	368
Saint Kitts and Nevis	25,569	54,288	32,892	31%	606
Saint Lucia	14,030	177,206	77,616	19%	438
Saint Vincent and the Grenadines	11,972	109,455	31,561	53%	288
Samoa	6,211	187,665	27,399	18%	146
San Marino	58,806	33,203	17,175	97%	517
São Tomé and Príncipe	3,721	191,266	25,587	74%	134
Saudi Arabia	48,921	31,557,144	16,125,701	84%	511
Senegal	3,068	15,411,614	2,454,059	48%	159
Serbia	18,351	6,944,975	2,347,402	56%	338
Seychelles	23,303	88,303	48,000	58%	544
Sierra Leone	1,238	5,439,695	610,222	43%	112
Singapore	97,341	5,703,600	1,870,000	100%	328
Slovakia	31,966	5,454,073	2,296,165	54%	421
Slovenia	39,038	2,087,946	1,052,325	55%	504
Solomon Islands	2,596	563,513	179,972	25%	319
Somalia	1,863	14,317,996	2,326,099	46%	162
South Africa	12,667	51,729,344	18,457,232	67%	357
South Korea	42,105	51,606,632	20,452,776	81%	396
South Sudan	1,796	11,177,490	2,680,681	20%	240
Spain	40,986	47,076,780	22,408,548	81%	476
Sri Lanka	12,287	21,203,000	2,631,650	19%	124
Sudan	4,192	38,647,804	2,831,291	35%	73
Suriname	16,954	526,103	78,620	66%	149
Sweden	52,609	10,285,453	4,618,169	88%	449
Switzerland	68,394	8,574,832	6,079,556	74%	709
Syria	8,587	20,824,892	4,500,000	55%	216
Tajikistan	2,616	8,177,809	1,787,400	28%	219
Tanzania	2,129	49,082,996	9,276,995	35%	189
Thailand	16,302	68,657,600	26,853,366	51%	391
Timor-Leste	3,345	1,268,671	63,875	31%	50
Togo	1,404	7,228,915	1,109,030	43%	153
Tonga	5,636	104,951	17,238	23%	164
Trinidad and Tobago	28,911	1,328,100	727,874	53%	548
Tunisia	10,505	11,143,908	2,700,000	70%	242
Turkey	28,289	83,429,616	35,374,156	76%	424
Turkmenistan	11,471	5,366,277	500,000	53%	93
Tuvalu	3,793	11,097	3,989	64%	360
Uganda	1,972	35,093,648	7,045,050	25%	201
Ukraine	11,535	45,004,644	15,242,025	70%	339
United Arab Emirates	67,119	9,770,529	5,617,682	87%	575
United Kingdom	46,290	66,460,344	30,771,140	84%	463
United States of America	61,498	326,687,488	265,224,528	83%	812
Uruguay	20,588	3,431,552	1,260,140	96%	367
Uzbekistan	5,164	29,774,500	4,000,000	50%	134
Vanuatu	3,062	270,402	70,225	26%	260
Venezuela	14,270	29,893,080	9,779,093	88%	327
Vietnam	5,089	86,932,496	9,570,300	37%	110
British Virgin Islands	24,216	20,645	21,099	49%	1,022
United States Virgin Islands	30,437	105,784	146,500	96%	1,385
Yemen	8,270	27,584,212	4,836,820	38%	175
Zambia	3,201	14,264,756	2,608,268	45%	183
Zimbabwe	3,191	12,500,525	1,449,752	32%	116

== Waste management by region ==
=== Australia ===
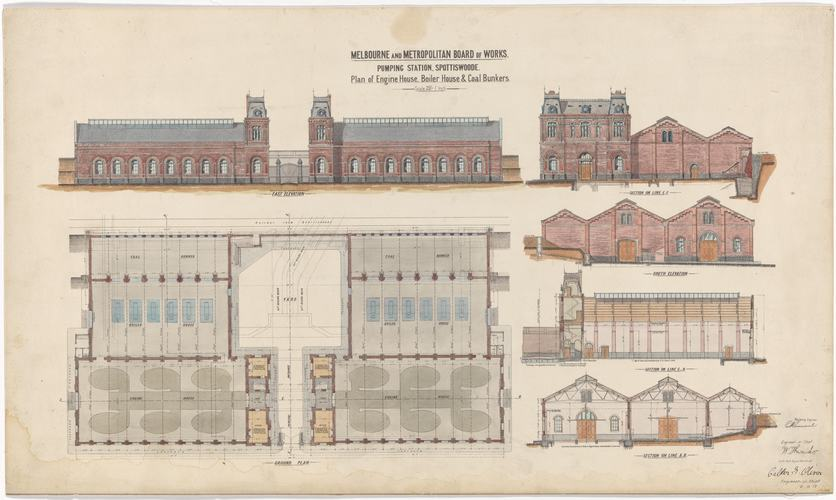
Print of a general arrangement drawing of the Melbourne and Metropolitan Board of Works sewerage pumping station, 1917. The station was built between 1893 and 1897 and it was one of the first of its kind, and one of the first waste management infrastructures in Melbourne. It served the city for 67 years.

Waste management in Australia started to be implemented as a modern system by the second half of the 19th century, with its progresses driven by technological and sanitary advances. It is currently regulated at both federal and state level. The Commonwealth's Department of the Environment and Energy is responsible for the national legislative framework.

The waste management has different effects and applications depending on the geographical, demographic and behavioural dynamics which it relates to. A number of reports and campaigns have been promoted.

The system is undergoing a process of reformation to establish a more consistent and circular economy-based legislation, a more reliable database and a stronger, more independent domestic industry. These factors have hampered the development of the industry and interstate relations.

=== China ===
Municipal solid waste generation shows spatiotemporal variation. In spatial distribution, the point sources in eastern coastal regions are quite different. Guangdong, Shanghai and Tianjin produced municipal solid waste (MSW) of 30.35, 7.85 and 2.95 Mt, respectively. In temporal distribution, during 2009–2018, Fujian province showed a 123% increase in MSW generation while Liaoning province showed only 7% increase, whereas Shanghai special zone had a decline of −11% after 2013. MSW composition characteristics are complicated. The major components such as kitchen waste, paper and rubber & plastics in different eastern coastal cities have fluctuation in the range of 52.8–65.3%, 3.5–11.9%, and 9.9–19.1%, respectively.

In 2021, China's recycling rate was about 20%.

=== Hungary ===
Hungary's first waste prevention program was their 2014-2020 national waste management plan. Their current program (2021–2027) is financed by European Union and international grants, domestic co-financing, product charges, and landfill taxes.

=== Morocco ===
Morocco has seen benefits from implementing a $300 million sanitary landfill system. While it might appear to be a costly investment, the country's government predicts that it has saved them another $440 million in damages, or consequences of failing to dispose of waste properly.

=== San Francisco ===
San Francisco started to make changes to their waste management policies in 2009 with the expectation to be zero waste by 2030. Council made changes such as making recycling and composting a mandatory practice for businesses and individuals, banning Styrofoam and plastic bags, putting charges on paper bags, and increasing garbage collection rates. Businesses are fiscally rewarded for correct disposal of recycling and composting and taxed for incorrect disposal. Besides these policies, the waste bins were manufactured in various sizes. The compost bin is the largest, the recycling bin is second, and the garbage bin is the smallest. This encourages individuals to sort their waste thoughtfully with respect to the sizes. These systems are working because they were able to divert 80% of waste from the landfill, which is the highest rate of any major U.S. city. Despite all these changes, Debbie Raphael, director of the San Francisco Department of the Environment, states that zero waste is still not achievable until all products are designed differently to be able to be recycled or compostable.

=== Turkey ===
Turkey generates about 30 million tons of solid municipal waste per year; the annual amount of waste generated per capita amounts to about 400 kilograms. About 95% of waste is collected.

=== United Kingdom ===
Waste management policy in England is the responsibility of the Department of the Environment, Food and Rural Affairs (DEFRA). In England, the "Waste Management Plan for England" presents a compilation of waste management policies. In the devolved regions such as Scotland, waste management policy is a responsibility of their own respective departments.

=== Zambia ===
In Zambia, ASAZA is a community-based organization whose principal purpose is to complement the efforts of the Government and cooperating partners to uplift the standard of living for disadvantaged communities. The project's main objective is to minimize the problem of indiscriminate littering which leads to land degradation and pollution of the environment. ASAZA is also at the same time helping alleviate the problems of unemployment and poverty through income generation and payment of participants, women, and unskilled youths.

== Scientific journals ==
Related scientific journals in this area include:

- Environmental and Resource Economics
- Environmental Monitoring and Assessment
- Journal of Environmental Assessment Policy and Management
- Journal of Environmental Economics and Management

== Bibliography ==
- Agunwamba, J. C. "Analysis of scavengers' activities and recycling in some cities of Nigeria." Environmental management 32 (2003): 116–127. online
- Anand, Subhash. Solid waste management (Mittal Publications, 2010) online.
- Downs, Mary, and Martin Medina. "A short history of scavenging." Comparative Civilizations Review 42.42 (2000): 4+ online.
- Guerrero, Lilliana Abarca, Ger Maas, and William Hogland. "Solid waste management challenges for cities in developing countries." Waste management 33.1 (2013): 220–232.
- Guo, Wei, et al. "Solid waste management in China: Policy and driving factors in 2004–2019." Resources, Conservation and Recycling 173 (2021): 105727.
- Hoornweg, Daniel, and Perinaz Bhada-Tata. "What a waste: a global review of solid waste management." (2012). online
- Letcher, Trevor M.; Vallero, Daniel A., eds. (2011). Waste: A Handbook for Management. Burlington: Academic Press. ISBN 978-0-12-381475-3.
- Ludwig, Christian, Stefanie Hellweg, and Samuel Stucki, eds. Municipal solid waste management: strategies and technologies for sustainable solutions (Springer Science & Business Media, 2012) online.
- Melosi, Martin V. The Sanitary City: Urban Infrastructure in America from Colonial Times to the Present (2nd ed. U of Pittsburgh Press, 2008) online
- Nanda, Sonil, and Franco Berruti. "Municipal solid waste management and landfilling technologies: a review." Environmental Chemistry Letters 19.2 (2021): 1433–1456.
- Reber, Patricia Bixler. "Free range pigs . . . in New York City" Researching Food History (January 13, 2014) online
- Reno, Joshua. "Waste and waste management." Annual Review of Anthropology 44.1 (2015): 557–572. online
- Reno, Joshua. "Motivated Markets: Instruments and Ideologies of Clean Energy in the United Kingdom," Cultural Anthropology 2011 26(3): 391–415
- Shove E. Comfort, Cleanliness and Convenience: the Social Organisation of Normality (Bloomsbury, 2004).
- Strasser, Susan. Waste and want: A social history of trash (Macmillan, 2000).
- Watson, Robert P., and Noah Zerbe. "Scavengers, Recyclers, and Solutions for Solid Waste Management in Indonesia." (1996): 268–271. JSTOR 45197669
- Weghmann, Vera. "Waste management in Europe." (2023). online
- Wilson, David C., et al. "Comparative analysis of solid waste management in 20 cities." Waste management & research 30.3 (2012): 237–254. online
- Zimring C. Cash for Your Trash: Scrap Recycling in America. (Rutgers University Press, 2005).
