= Environmental reporting =

Environmental reporting may refer to:

- Environmental journalism
- Environmental accounting
  - Sustainability accounting
- Environmental reports
