= Transport and the Environment =

The Transport and the Environment report, published in 1994, was the 18th report published by the Royal Commission on Environmental Pollution. It provided a detailed and comprehensive study of the environmental impact of transport in the United Kingdom and was chaired by Sir John Houghton. The New Scientist commented "Rarely, if ever, can a ministry have emerged so badly from an official report as John MacGregor's old department", in an article titled "Head-on collision over transport: The British government has received its sternest warning yet that its unflagging support for the car is seriously at odds with its own green principles".

== See also ==
- Roads for Prosperity
- Roads in the United Kingdom
