= GEO-2000 =

UN environment programme

GEO-2000 (also GEO-2) is the second edition of the United Nations Environment Programme (UNEP) Global Environment Outlook (GEO) series, which aims to assess and report on the state of the global environment. The UNEP officially launched the Global Environment Outlook in 1995, with the goal of providing comprehensive, scientifically grounded assessments of key environmental issues. The first report, GEO-1, was published in 1997, and the second, GEO-2000 (GEO-2), was released in 1999.

As part of an ongoing series, GEO-2000 built upon the findings of the first report and expanded its scope.

- nitrogen's harmful impact on ecosystems
- increased severity of natural disasters
- species invasion as a result of globalization
- increased environmental pressures caused by urbanization
- decline in the quality of governance in some countries
- new wars which impact on both the immediate environment and neighbouring states
- the impact of refugees on the natural environment

The GEO series, which has since grown to include reports such as GEO-3 (2002), GEO-4 (2007), and GEO-5 (2012), serves as a critical tool for global environmental policy, providing not only global assessments but also regional and sub-regional reports, technical studies, and educational materials. This expansive approach underscores the portability of the GEO methodology, which has been applied across various scales—from global to local—ensuring that the findings remain relevant and actionable for decision-makers and stakeholders worldwide.
