= Annual report =

Statement on a company's activities in the previous year

An annual report is a comprehensive report on a company's activities throughout the preceding year. Annual reports are intended to give shareholders and other interested people information about the company's activities and financial performance. They may be considered as grey literature. Most jurisdictions require companies to prepare and disclose annual reports, and many require the annual report to be filed at the company's registry. Companies with issued shares publicly listed are also required to report at more frequent intervals (depending upon the rules of the stock exchange involved).

== Content ==
The contents of annual reports may vary from country to country, subject to local laws and regulations. However, typically, annual reports may include:

- General corporate information
- Operating and financial review
- Director's Report
- Corporate governance information
- Chairpersons statement
- Auditor's report
- Sustainability and ESG information
- Green annual report
- Contents: non-audited information
- Financial statements, including
  - Balance sheet also known as Statement of Financial Position
  - Income statement also known as profit and loss statement.
  - Statement of changes in equity
  - Cash flow statement
- Notes to the financial statements
- Accounting policies
- Independent assurance statements
- Other features

Other information deemed relevant to stakeholders may be included, such as a report on operations for manufacturing firms or corporate social responsibility reports for companies with environmentally or socially sensitive operations. In the case of larger companies, it is usually a sleek, colorful, high-gloss publication.

The details provided in the report are of use to investors to understand the company's financial position and future direction. The financial statements are usually compiled in compliance with IFRS and/or the domestic GAAP, as well as domestic legislation (e.g. the SOX in the U.S.).

In the United States, a more-detailed version of the report, called a Form 10-K, is submitted to the U.S. Securities and Exchange Commission. A publicly held company may also issue a much more limited version of an annual report, which is known as a "wrap report." A wrap report is a Form 10-K with an annual report cover wrapped around it.

=== Directors' Role ===
The Directors are generally responsible for preparing the Annual Report and the financial statements in accordance with applicable laws and accounting standards, and to ensure these financial statements give a true and fair view of the state of affairs of the company and of the profit or loss of the company for that period. These principles are reflected across most major jurisdictions, although specific statutory bases differ. Some major jurisdictions and statutes include:

- United Kingdom - Companies Act 2006, s.393 (Accounts to give true and fair view)
- Ireland - Companies Act 2014, s.325 (Obligation to prepare directors' report)
- Australia - Corporations Act 2001, s.295A (CEO/CFO declaration in relation to financial statements)
- New Zealand - Companies Act 1993, s.211 (Contents of annual report)
- United States - SOX (15 U.S.C. § 7241) requires CFO/CEO certification rather than a director's statement.

=== Missed Report Penalty ===
Failing to submit an annual report within the designated deadline can result in serious legal and financial consequences for a company. For example, in Estonia, failing to meet this deadline can lead to penalties, including fines and, in more severe cases, the potential removal of the company from the register.

=== Sustainability reporting ===
Sustainability reporting has increasingly become an important part of annual reporting both nationally and internationally due to heightened societal and political awareness of issues surrounding pollution and climate change. Since the early 2000's, ESG disclosure has increasingly become institutionalized and standardized. For example, the European Union requires larger companies to disclose information regarding the societal and environmental impact of their operations.

== History ==
Among the first companies reporting on operations and financials was the Dutch East India Company (VOC), seeking to attract new investors. Not more than three centuries later, one of the first examples of a more transparent annual report was produced in 1837 by Robert R. Minturn, director of the New York and New Haven Railroad Company, including details about the railroad's financials, operations as well as prospects.

In 1903, US Steel published an annual report whose financial accuracy was certified by Price, Waterhouse & Co in what is known as the earliest modern corporate annual report.

== 'Alternative' annual reports ==
Certain groups such as The True Cost Of Chevron Network have released 'alternative' annual reports as a way to highlight ongoing environmental destruction and/or human rights abuses committed by a particular company.

== See also ==
- Form 10-K, the basic information required by the US Securities and Exchange Commission
- US corporate law
- Green annual report
- Grey literature
