= Nuclear Power and the Environment =

1976 UK government report

- Author: UK Royal Commission on Environmental Pollution
- Publication date: September 1976

Nuclear Power and the Environment, sometimes simply called the Flowers Report, was released in September 1976 and is the sixth report of the UK Royal Commission on Environmental Pollution, chaired by Sir Brian Flowers. The report was dedicated to "the Queen's most excellent Majesty." "He was appointed "to advise on matters, both national and international, concerning the pollution of the environment; on the adequacy of research in this field; and the future possibilities of danger to the environment." One of the recommendations of the report was that:

"There should be no commitment to a large programme of nuclear fission power until it has been demonstrated beyond reasonable doubt that a method exists to ensure the safe containment of longlived, highly radioactive waste for the indefinite future."

The "Flowers Report" was prompted by a proposal in 1975 to set up an international nuclear fuel reprocessing plant in Windscale. Windscale is a large nuclear facility on the coast of Cumbria in Northwest England that was built after World War II to produce plutonium for England's nuclear weapons program. The facility suffered a leak in 1973, which put it out of commission until the plans for the international nuclear fuel reprocessing plant were proposed. This proposal was met with strong resistance after it became known to the public and as a result, the plans to build the nuclear reprocessing plant were never acted upon. Radioactive waste management and disposal strategies have been enacted since the publishing of "The Flowers Report". This put the responsibility of disposing radioactive waste into the hands of those who are producing it. It was not until 1982 that the Department of the Environment, after their previous method proved to be not as effective as they had hoped, decided to enact stronger guidelines and rules regarding radioactive waste. The responsibility of disposal was then passed over to the government. This led to the Department of the Environment gaining a few new responsibilities: securing the disposal process at an establishment, making sure the method of disposal is safe and well researched, and lastly, keeping the waste secured and away from the public after it has been disposed of. In the United States, as of 2008, uranium ore reserves are primarily kept in Wyoming and New Mexico, totaling an estimated one billion, 227 million pounds. This uranium ore will be turned into fuel that will be used in the operation of nuclear power plants, creating low-levels of radioactive waste. "Spent" uranium fuel becomes radioactive waste as a result of the fission process. This "spent" fuel must be removed and replaced from nuclear power plants every 18 to 24 months; it is then shipped to specifically designed and licensed disposal sites. The U.S. Nuclear Regulatory Commission and the U.S. Department of Transportation carefully control and regulate the management, packing, transport, and disposal of waste.

== The Flowers Report ==
The Flowers report is composed of eleven chapters in a compilation of over 200 pages. The chapters cover a wide range of subjects and topics related to radioactive activity.

== Chapter One: Introduction ==
The Flower's Report introduction chapter consists of six pages. The report introduces the topics of nuclear technology, future projections on commercial reactors, concerns for left over radioactive waste, other uses of nuclear technology (that will not be the focus of the report), and concerns with development of nuclear reactors. This chapter also gives an arrangement of the entire report's information that acts as an outline for the information presented, including later chapters' topics and main points.

== Chapter Two: Radioactivity and Radiobiology ==
The focus of the first half of the chapter is designed to provide basic information about atoms and radiation to aid in later chapters. The first half covers the basics on atoms such as: an atom consists of Neutrons, Protons, and Electrons; the atomic number of an atom determines the amount of protons in one atom; and that protons are roughly 2000 times heavier than electrons (see atom). The concept of radiation is introduced through ionization which is the process of adding one or more electrons to, or removing one or more electrons from, atoms or molecules, thereby creating ions. From there certain particles can cause ionization. The ionizing particles are alpha particles (a type of ionizing radiation ejected by the nuclei of some unstable atoms that are large subatomic fragments consisting of two protons and two neutrons), beta particles (subatomic particles ejected from the nucleus of some radioactive atoms that are equivalent to electrons), gamma particles (electromagnetic energy photon) and energetic neutron radiation (energy released from an atom in the form of neutral particles called neutrons). The second half focuses on knowledge of radiation introduced into the environment and humans. Flower's and his team concluded in 1976 that low levels over a long exposure time can prevent a cell from dividing or further damaging genetic information. Other topics covered are the effects of plutonium in the body. For instance, animals being susceptible to radiation causes birth defects among the litter. Chapter two concludes with a concern of radiation affecting an entire species of animals as opposed to a group.

== Chapter Three: Nuclear Power ==
Chapter Three focuses on nuclear power. This chapter main concentration is on nuclear reactors and the basic physical principals of which reactor operation is based. An understanding of the different types of reactors that are in use or plan to be used is given. It also accounts for the nuclear fuel cycle and the operations that are involved in the fabrication and treatment of nuclear fuel. It begins with the extraction of uranium from the mine to the fuel fabrication plant and then to reactors. Furthermore, it incorporates the removal of spent fuel and its treatment to extract material suitable for incorporation of fresh fuel along with the treatment and disposal of wastes.

== Chapter Four: Major Issues Raised by Nuclear Power ==
Chapter Four emphasizes on major issues raised by nuclear power. The reason why chapter two and chapter three are so detailed in the effects of radioactivity and the principles of nuclear power along with the nuclear fuel cycle is so that there could be a better understanding on the problems that could cause environmental effects. Concerns about nuclear development, which is considered in detail in other chapters, centers on a few major issues. This chapter focuses on issues as a whole to ensure that they can be seen in the perspective that allows people to understand the underlying social and ethical questions that they raise. It begins with the world energy demand, the problem scale of nuclear development, and nuclear hazards that stem from other technological developments. The advantages must be weighed against the fears and risks attached to nuclear power, which can lead to many people disregarding nuclear power as an acceptable means of energy, also referred to as "the Faustian bargain." Certainly these fears must be taken seriously and can not be disregarded. This chapter concludes with the concerns of the future and the fact that the world is on the threshold of a huge commitment to fission power, which if fully entered into, it may be effectively impossible to reverse for a century or more.

== Chapter Five: International and National Control Arrangements ==
Chapter Five focuses on the internal and national control arrangements. It begins by accepting that the hazards of ionizing radiation are well appreciated by anyone who works in the field and that there is, and has been, an elaborate system at the national and international level to minimize these risks. Although there are many questions to be answered, much has been learned and there has been a stricter management with respect to ionizing radiation and protecting the health of both radiation workers and the general public. It suggests that greater resources should be allocated to a critical group that is most exposed to a particular pollutant in order to determine a safe discharge criteria. This chapter also focuses on the organizational arrangements of responsibility, which may still be unclear. If a rapid expansion in the near future occurs, new problems are likely to rise; thus, creating new changes in the allocation of responsibilities. It focuses on the present arrangements, their efficacy, and recommendations that arise in order to sustain efficacy and effectiveness. It does not discuss discharges of radioactivity to the environment, but rather presents arrangements that are made in order to ensure protection to the general public and the environment.

== Chapter Six: Reactor Safety and Siting ==
Chapter Six stresses on reactor safety and compares the risks of reactor accidents with those arising from other activities or events. It clearly states that absolute safety cannot be ensured and that the advancing scale and complexity of technology tends to increase the possible consequences of serious accidents as well as the problems by which these accidents may be caused. Accordingly, all that can be expected is that the techniques and disciplines used to ensure safety are enough to reduce accidents to acceptable rates. The biggest concern in this chapter is the environmental effects of possible reactor accidents. The focus is on looking into the principles that are applied in seeking reactor safety.

== Chapter Seven: Security and the Safeguarding of Plutonium ==
Chapter Seven focuses on security and the safeguarding of plutonium. Much of the concern that is presented with nuclear power is not strictly on the effects of normal operations, but to those that might be created by illicit activities directed towards nuclear installations or materials. The issues that arise within this chapter are the safeguarding of society, security arrangements, and the viewpoint of the ordinary citizen about the restrictions on their freedom that might result from security measures. One of the risks discussed is the sabotage of nuclear installation which could release harmful substances into the environment along with radioactivity. Another risk is the diversion of plutonium which could be made into a bomb or dispersed deliberately and will only increase along with the reliance of plutonium in fast conductors. Lastly, in regards to whether or not the measures necessary to protect society against these risks are going to interfere with civil liberties.

== Chapter Eight: Radioactive Waste Management ==
Chapter Eight focuses on radioactive waste management which is generated at various stages of the nuclear fuel cycle. This chapter focuses more strictly on radioactive waste, specifically on the waste that presents particularly difficult problems regarding its disposal and management. It also covers the harms that are present in the storage of nuclear waste along with the steps that are being taken to ensure that no harm is caused to the environment. Furthermore, this chapter considers the possibilities that exist for a safe disposal of these wastes and the organization needed to pursue the search and judge its results.

== Chapter Nine: Energy Strategy and the Environment ==
Chapter Nine focuses on energy storage and the environment along with the implications of a large nuclear power program. This chapters seeks and attempts to provide some understanding of those issues that bear on the question of whether great future dependence on nuclear fission power must be regarded as inevitable. It also helps understand if these implications should be accepted and what other alternate strategies might be available along with their economic, social, and environmental consequences. Some examples mentioned as acceptable means of energy are wave power and CHP systems.

== Chapter Ten: Nuclear Power and Public Policy ==
Chapter Ten reflects on nuclear power and public safety. This chapter draws the line on which policy should be adopted towards the development of nuclear power. Due to the popular belief that the spread of technology is responsible for the environment progressively deteriorating, nuclear power is highly opposed in some countries. This chapter mainly focuses on the United States and how the debate between the nuclear industry and the environmental movement has become increasingly controversial. One side of the spectrum sees technology as "blind to the dangers of the world", whereas the other side believes they "are making an essential contribution to the well-being of humanity." Also, this issue brings about the concerns of large scale nuclear power leading to a nuclear war on account of the connection of civil and military uses of nuclear power with the expansion of nuclear development.

== Chapter Eleven ==
Chapter Eleven is a summary of principal conclusions and recommendations.

== See also ==
- List of books about nuclear issues
- Nuclear or Not?
- Environmental impact of nuclear power
- Acute Radiation Syndrome
