= Global Environment Outlook =

Global Environment Outlook (GEO) is a series of reports that review the state and direction of the global environment, issued periodically by the United Nations Environment Program (UNEP). The GEO project is a response to the environmental reporting requirements of UN Agenda 21 and to a UNEP Governing Council decision of May 1995.

It was introduced after the 1992 Rio Conference on Environment and Development, at a time when government and stakeholders lacked a common information basis to develop a broad and comprehensive view of environmental issues.

Seven GEO reports have been published to date: GEO-1 in 1997, GEO-2000 (i.e., GEO-2) in 1999, GEO-3 in 2002, GEO-4 in 2007, GEO-5 in 2012, GEO-6 in 2019, and GEO-7 in 2025.

== GEO process ==
GEO is a global process conducted by the United Nations Environment Programme (UNEP). Its approach is based on the global integrated environment assessment (IEA), as well as at a regional, national and local levels around the world. The process provides an assessment of the current state of the environment, an evaluation of the effectiveness of policies and actions taken to address environmental issues, and projections of future environmental trends.

This process also includes a review of scientific knowledge which may come from several institutions. This comes from universities and consists of established theories and methods to establish new research. Following that, would be the indigenous Knowledge which focuses on knowledge and information gathered from the local area. Although not as formal as the previous source, it's becoming increasingly recognized for its insight on social-ecological systems. Lastly, there's the technical knowledge which is characterized by statistical data, procedural information, or policy related evaluations. Each category of scientific knowledge is followed up with consultation from a wide range of stakeholders, including governments, non-governmental organizations, and the private sector.

The process is intended to inform policy and decision-making at the national and international levels.

The GEO way of doing a global assessment aims to do the following:

- cover a broad spectrum of issues, including socio-economic aspects.
- adopt global and regional perspectives throughout; and with cross-scale perspectives in mind. The global issues are framed in their regional context in terms of actual policy environments, vulnerabilities, and development issues.
- collaborate and encourage a participatory process. It builds a positive impact from a constantly changing network of individuals and institutions.
- be science-based and policy-relevant. It balances flexibility and structure for its process and concepts.
- cover an analysis of the past, present, and future by recurring on several circuits of data and expertise, namely history, monitoring, modelling, and political science.
- include assessments of policies without being policy-prescriptive.

== See also ==
- Sustainable development
