= Green annual report =

A green annual report is an annual report on a company's financial status that is printed using production processes that save energy, trees, water, and also reduce waste and greenhouse gases. According to a 2005 survey that studied trends in annual reporting, the average number of pages in an annual report was 65, and the number of copies produced averaged between more than 5,000 to less than 50,000.

Green annual reports are frequently printed using eco-friendly soy inks. In comparison with traditional petroleum-based ink, soy inks are environmentally friendlier, are available in brighter colors, and make it easier to recycle paper. Petroleum-based inks contain 30-35% Volatile organic compounds (VOCs), while soybean oil-based inks typically range from only 0-5% VOCs. New processes also had to be developed to make the de-inking and recycling of paper easier, and soy-based inks perform better in conjunction with modern de-inking procedures. Green annual reports are also frequently printed on FSC (Forest Stewardship Council) Certified Printers. The FSC is an independent, non-governmental, not-for-profit organization established to promote the responsible management of the world's forests. On February 17, 2009, the WWF (World Wildlife Fund) announced that they were reaffirming the FSC as still the best environmentally responsible certification scheme for business.

An eco audit statement is placed in the final document that estimates the number of trees preserved, pounds of water-borne waste that was not created, number of gallons of waste-water flow saved, pounds of solid waste not generated, net pounds of greenhouse gases prevented and the amount of energy in million BTUs not consumed. An eco audit is "a management tool comprising a systematic, documented, periodic, and objective evaluation of how well environmental organization, management and equipment are performing with the aim of contributing to safeguarding the environment by: facilitating management control of environmental practices and assessing compliance with company policies, which would include meeting regulatory requirements."
