= Recycling Rates of Metals report =

Recycling Rates of Metals: A Status Report
- Type: Independent scientific assessment
- Publication: International Resource Panel, UNEP
- Website: www.resourcepanel.org

Recycling Rates of Metals: A Status Report was the 2nd of six scientific assessments on global metals to be published by the International Resource Panel (IRP) of the United Nations Environment Programme. The IRP provides independent scientific assessments and expert advice on a variety of areas, including:

• the volume of selected raw material reserves and how efficiently these resources are being used

• the lifecycle-long environmental impacts of products and services created and consumed around the globe

• options to meet human and economic needs with fewer or cleaner resources.

== About the report ==
As metal use has increased during the 20th and 21st centuries, there has been a substantial shift from metal resources being subterranean geological stores to becoming ‘above-ground’ stocks in use in society. Metals can be used over and over again, saving energy and minimising the negative environmental impacts associated with mining virgin material, so it makes sense to recycle these above-ground stocks. However, the report found that less than a third of the crucial 60 metals studied in the report have an end-of-life recycling rate above 50 per cent, and 34 of them have a recycling rate of below 1 per cent.

Green technologies would certainly benefit from greater metal recycling. Among the least-recycled metals are tellurium and gallium, which are used in solar cells, and lithium, which is a key component of the batteries in electric cars. Stocks of these metals are often tied up in old gadgets, such as out-of-date mobile phones, which people often leave in a cupboard and forget about. The report’s authors concluded that appropriate recycling infrastructure should be developed, supported by policy instruments such as research and development, economic incentives and capacity-building activities.
