= Dioxin Reassessment Report =

US reassessment of health effects of dioxins

The Dioxin Reassessment Report refers to the United States Environmental Protection Agency's scientific reassessment of the health effects of exposure to dioxins. It began in April 1991, and in 1994 was published for public review. In 1995 the Science Advisory Board (SAB) reviewed it, concluding that three chapters (eight, nine and a new chapter) be subject to independent peer review. This involved a 2003 review of the reassessment by the Interagency Working Group on Dioxin (Dioxin IWG), who recommended a further review by the National Academy of Sciences (NAS). This review by the NAS began in November 2004, and was expected to end by June 2006. As of 2012, the review is ongoing.

== Sources ==
- EPA Dioxin Reassessment Report
