= Royal Commission on Environmental Pollution =

1970 UK advisory body, 1970 to 2011

The Royal Commission on Environmental Pollution in the United Kingdom was created under Royal Warrant in 1970 to advise the monarch, Government, Parliament and the public on environmental issues. It was closed on 1 April 2011, as part of the Coalition Government's spending cuts.

== Overview ==
The Commission's reports covered both the natural environment and the built environment, including topics such as nuclear power, energy use and climate change, the environmental impact of housing, and the use of pesticides and chemicals.

The Commission was a non-departmental public body sponsored by the Department for Environment, Food and Rural Affairs, to whom it reported.

== Reports ==
=== Major reports ===
- 1st report: First report of the Royal Commission on Environmental Pollution (1971)
- 2nd report: Three issues in Industrial Pollution (1972)
- 3rd report: Pollution in some British Estuaries and Coastal Waters (1972)
- 4th report: Pollution Control: Progress and Problems (1974)
- 5th report: Air Pollution Control: An integrated approach (1976)
- 6th report: Nuclear Power and the Environment (1976)
- 7th report: Agriculture and Pollution (1979)
- 8th report: Oil Pollution of the Sea (1981)
- 9th report: Lead in the Environment (1983)
- 10th report: Tackling Pollution - Experience and Prospects (1984)
- 11th report: Managing Waste: The duty of care (1985)
- 12th report: Best Practicable Environmental Option (1988)
- 13th report: The Release of Genetically Engineered Organisms to the Environment (1989)
- 14th report: GENHAZ - A System for the Critical Appraisal of Proposals to Release Genetically Modified Organisms into the Environment (1991)
- 15th report: Emissions from Heavy Duty Diesel Vehicles (1991)
- 16th report: Freshwater Quality (1992)
- 17th report: Incineration of Waste (1993)
- 18th report: Transport and the Environment (1994)
- 19th report: Sustainable use of Soil (1996)
- 20th report: Transport and the Environment (1997)
- 21st report: Setting environmental standards (1998)
- 22nd report: Energy - The Changing Climate (2000)
- 23rd report: Environmental Planning (2002)
- 24th report: Chemicals in Products (2003)
- 25th report: Turning the Tide (2004)
- 26th report: The Urban Environment (2006)
- 27th report: Novel Materials in the Environment (2008)
- 28th report: Adapting Institutions to Climate Change (2010)
- 29th report: Environmental Impacts of Demographic Change (2011)

=== Short reports ===
- Short report: The Environmental Effects of Civil Aircraft in Flight (2002)
- Short report: Biomass as a Renewable Energy Source (2004)
- Short report: Crop Spraying (2005)
- Short report: Artificial Light in the Environment (2009)

== Notable members ==
- Marian Scott, statistician
- Launcelot Fleming, Anglican bishop and geologist

== See also ==
- Royal commission
- Pollution
