= Environmental Risks and Challenges of Anthropogenic Metals Flows and Cycles =

- Type: Independent scientific assessment
- Publication: May 2013, International Resource Panel
- Website: www.resourcepanel.org

The report Environmental Risks and Challenges of Anthropogenic Metals Flows and Cycles was the third of six scientific assessments on global metals to be published by the International Resource Panel (IRP) of the United Nations Environment Programme. The IRP provides independent scientific assessments and expert advice on a variety of areas, including:

- The volume of selected raw material reserves and how efficiently these resources are being used
- The lifecycle-long environmental impacts of products and services created and consumed around the globe
- options to meet human and economic needs with fewer or cleaner resources.

== About the report ==
Metals and their compounds have been used for millennia because of their unique properties. They are used in highly valued products of modern technology, furthermore, they play an essential role in renewable energy technologies. After having analyzed issues of metal stocks in society and recycling rates and recycling conditions and opportunities in the previous two reports on metals, Metal Stocks in Society report and Recycling Rates of Metals report, the International Resource Panel decides to address the environmental and energy issues related to the use and the production of metals. In this report, an assessment is made of the literature on metal flows and cycles in nature and in society, the way they are connected, and the potential impact related to them. The four areas of focus are 1) Local impacts of mining, 2) life cycle energy use, 3) non-metal sources, and 4) the need for a final sink. Furthermore, the author points out that sustainable metals management cannot be defined in isolation, because a global issue like this is linked to many other issues at the global level: population and welfare increase, the concurrent expected rise in demand for food, water, and energy, the availability of metals and other non-renewable materials, the shift to a renewable energy system, dietary choices, etc. Therefore, it should be part of an overall effort to steer society towards a more sustainable development.

The production of different metals has different potentials to impact the environment. The report gives reasons why metals can become relatively more important from an environmental impact point of view. First of all, the demand for most metals is rising rapidly and this trend is expected to continue in the coming decades. Secondly, a shift towards a renewable energy system implies that the material, especially metal, intensity of energy production will increase substantially. Thirdly, in the future, the energy intensity of the production of metals is expected to increase due to the use of lesser grades of ores.
