= Civic engagement =

Individual or group activity addressing issues of public concern

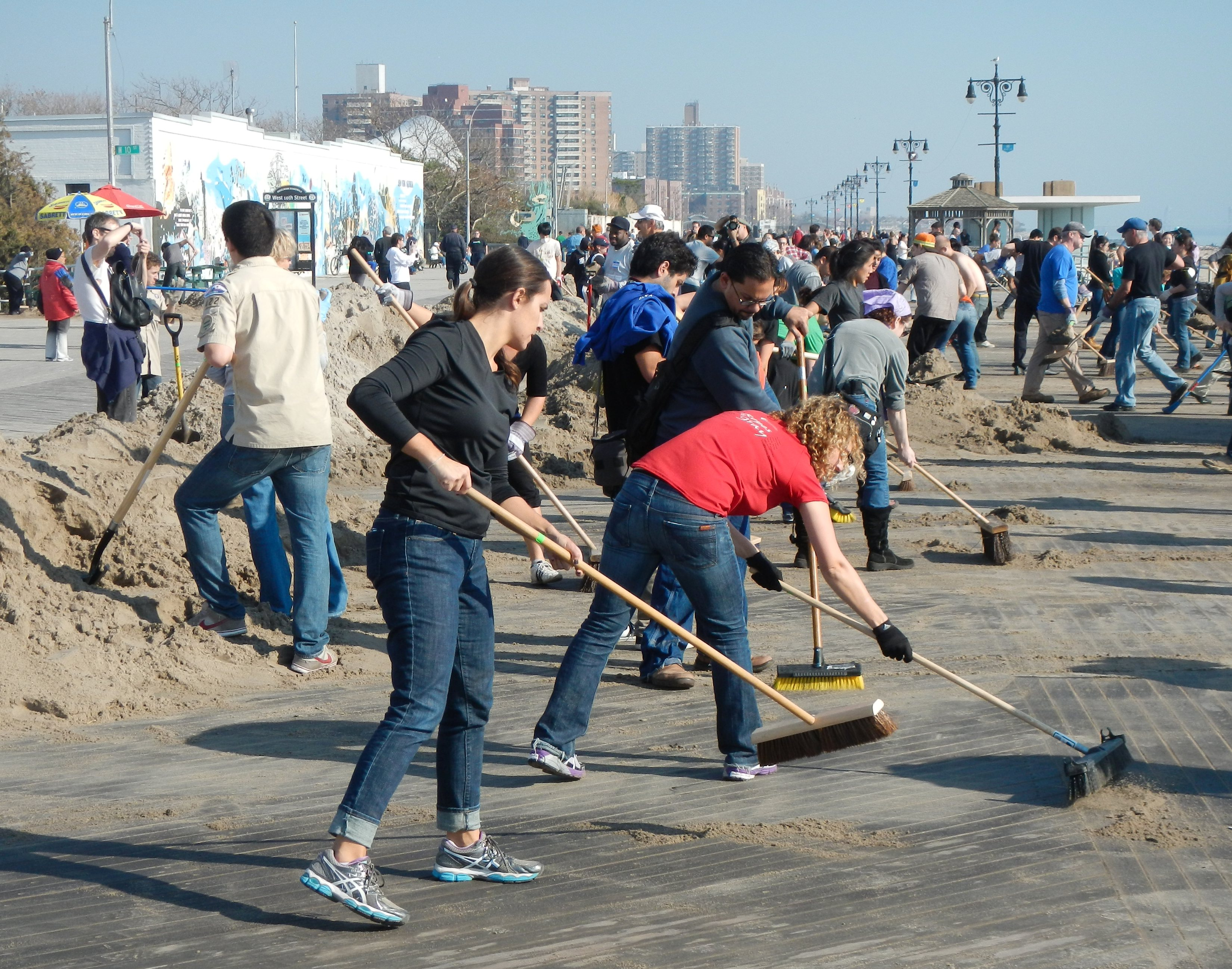
Volunteering is an important type of civic engagement. Pictured are volunteers cleaning up after the 2012 Hurricane Sandy.

Civic engagement (sometimes called civic participation) is any individual or group activity addressing issues of public concern. Civic engagement includes communities working together or individuals working alone in both political and non-political actions to protect public values or make a change in a community. The goal of civic engagement is to address public concerns and improve the quality of community life.

Civic engagement is "a process in which people take collective action to address issues of public concern" and is "instrumental to democracy". Underrepresentation in government can lead to the concerns of minority, low-income, and younger populations being overlooked. In turn, issues for higher voting groups are addressed more frequently, causing more bills to be passed to fix these problems.

== Forms ==
Civic engagement can take many forms—from individual volunteerism, community engagement efforts, organizational involvement, and electoral participation. These engagements may include directly addressing a problem through personal- or community-based work, or work through the institutions of representative democracy. Many individuals feel a sense of personal responsibility to actively engage in their community. "Youth civic engagement" has similar aims to develop the community environment and cultivate relationships, although youth civic engagement emphasizes empowering young people. A study published by the Center for Information & Research on Civic Learning & Engagement at Tufts University categorized civic engagement into three categories: civic, electoral, and political voice. Scholars of youth engagement online have called for a broader interpretation of civic engagement that focuses on the purpose behind current institutions and activities and includes emerging institutions and activities that achieve the same purposes. A journal published by the Journal of Transformative Education suggests the gap in participation forms between different generations. These civic engagement researchers suggest that the reduction of civic life into small sets of explicitly electoral behaviors may be insufficient to describe the full spectrum of public involvement in civic life.

Measures of civic engagement
| Civic | Electoral | Political voice |
|---|---|---|
| Community problem solving | Regular voting | Contacting officials |
| Regular volunteering for a non-electoral organization | Persuading others to vote | Contacting the print media |
| Active membership in a group or association | Displaying buttons, signs, stickers | Contacting the broadcast media |
| Participation in fund-raising run/walk/ride | Campaign contributions | Protesting |
| Other fund-raising for charity | Volunteering for candidate or political organizations | Email petitions |
| Run for political office | Registering voters | Written petitions and canvassing |
| Symbolic non-participation | | Boycotting |

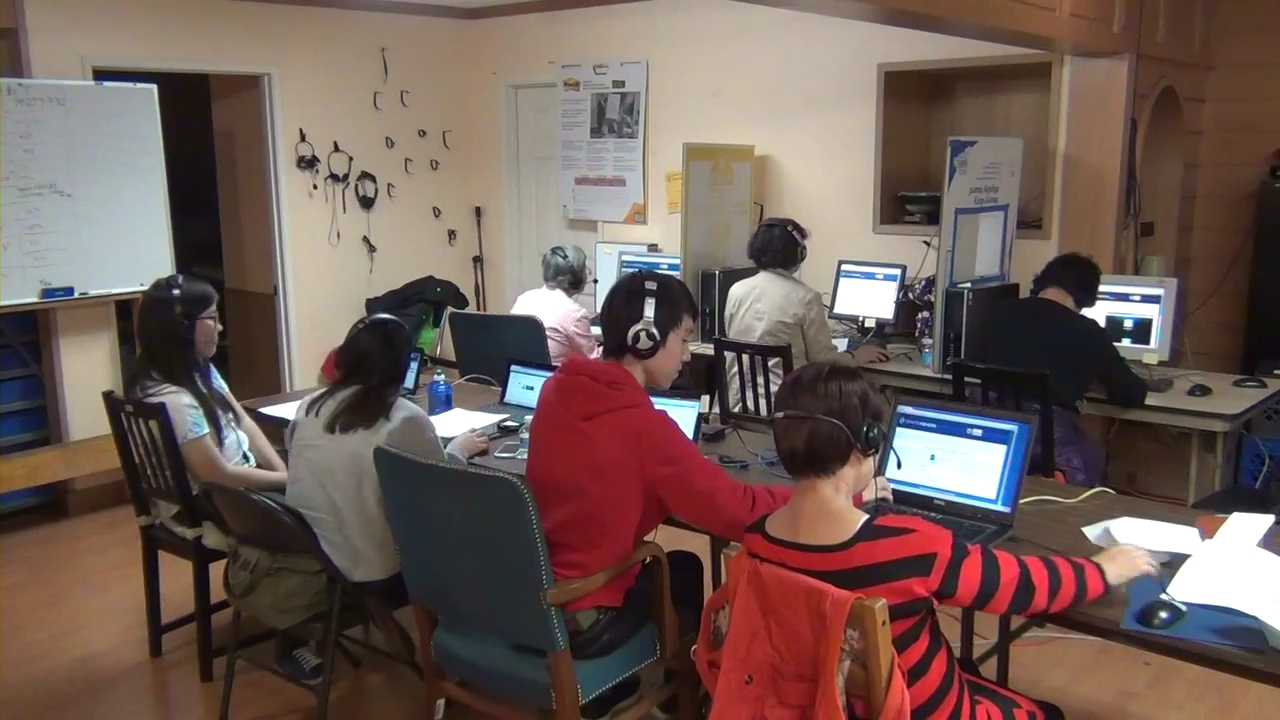
An example of civic engagement, in the form of phone banking

Civic engagement reform arose at the beginning of the 21st century after Robert Putnam's book Bowling Alone brought to light changes in civic participation patterns. Putnam argued that despite rapid increases in higher education opportunities that may foster civic engagement, Americans were dropping out of political and organized community life. A number of studies suggested that while more youth are volunteering, fewer are voting or becoming politically engaged.

== Role of volunteerism in transforming governance ==
The State of the World's Volunteerism Report 2015, the first global review of the power of volunteer voices to help improve the way people are governed, draws on evidence from countries as diverse as Brazil, Kenya, Lebanon and Bangladesh. The United Nations report shows how ordinary people are volunteering their time, energies and skills to improve the way they are governed and engaged at local, national and global levels. Better governance at every level is a pre-requisite for the success of the new set of targets for future international development, the Sustainable Development Goals, which has been agreed upon by the United Nations in September 2015.

At the global level, for instance, a diverse group of 37 online volunteers from across the globe engaged in 4 months of intense collaboration with the United Nations Department of Economic Affairs (UN DESA) to process 386 research surveys carried out across 193 UN Member States for the 2014 UN E-Government Survey. The diversity of nationalities and languages of the online volunteers—more than 65 languages, 15 nationalities, of which half are from developing countries—mirrors the mission of the survey.

== Benefits and challenges ==
Civic engagement, in general, can foster community participation and government involvement, according to ICMA: Leaders at the Core of Better Communities.

The specific benefits of civic engagement are:

- Achieving greater buy-in to decisions with fewer backlashes such as lawsuits, special elections, or a council recall.
- Engendering trust between citizens and government, which improves public behavior at council meetings.
- Attaining successful outcomes on complex issues, which helps elected officials avoid choosing between equally unappealing solutions.
- Developing more creative ideas and better solutions.
- Implementing ideas, programs, and policies faster and more easily.
- Creating involved citizens than demanding customers.
- Building a community within a city.
- Making jobs easier and more relaxing.

While there are benefits to civic engagement, there are challenges to be considered. These challenges include the various factors the ICMA describes. For example, distrust, role clarification, and time all play a role in challenges of civic engagement:

- Civic engagement often takes longer to show results than direct government action. In the long run, public reactions to government policy or legal decisions can lead to faster change than government involvement in lawsuits or ballot initiatives.
- For civic engagement to succeed, a layer of transparency and trust between the government and its citizens is needed.

=== Barriers ===
Research has shown that civic engagement tends to have structural barriers that shape who can participate. The structural barriers are socioeconomic inequality, limited access to education, geographic separation, and support of institutions. These barriers impact civic opportunities and people's capacity to gain civic knowledge and skills. Researchers talk about the disparities within civic engagement based on broader social and institutional circumstances. Minority communities tend to have less political representation, resources, and have less opportunities for engagement. This contributes back to the gap which includes race, age, and economic status.

=== Opportunity gaps ===
Joseph Kahne and Ellen Middaugh describe an opportunity gap in civic engagement. Students with higher economic status tend to be more educated in civic engagement and how to make political decisions. On the other hand, students with lower resources and lower economic status tend to have limited access to civic engagement learning. Better educational access to civic information tends to increase voting participation and political participation in the long term.

== Local civic engagement ==
Within local communities, there are many opportunities for citizens to participate in civic engagement. Volunteering for community projects is often associated with strengthened community development. Community engagement could be found at food pantries, community clean-up programs, and the like, bolstering efforts for a strong community bond.

=== Community collaboration ===
Community collaboration includes democratic spaces where people are open to discussing concerns for particular issues regarding public interest and means to make the changes necessary. These spaces are often resource centers, such as neighborhood associations or school boards where citizens can obtain information regarding the community (upcoming changes, proposed solutions to existing problems, etc.). Colleges and universities are also offering more opportunities and expecting more students to engage in community volunteer work.

According to a case study conducted in a U.S. college in September 2014, there are pivotal leadership qualities that contribute to the development of civic engagement. The study mentions 3 main themes: active, adaptive, and resilient leadership, learning for leadership and engagement for the greater good as the main reasons for the success of The Democracy Commitment (TDC) in the college. TDC is a national initiative that intends to help U.S. community colleges educate their students for democracy.

Political participation is another key element that is practiced with regularity. Involvement in public council meeting sessions for discussions informs citizens of necessities and changes that need to be made. Casting an informed vote at the local level can change many things that affect day-to-day life.

Community-led initiatives such as Buz Stop Boys have contributed to improving urban sanitation in Accra.

Online engagement allows citizens to be involved in their local government that they would not have otherwise by allowing them to voice themselves from the comfort of their own homes. Online engagement involves things such as online voting and public discussion forums that give citizens the opportunity to voice their opinions on topics and offer solutions as well as find others with common interests and create the possibility of forming advocacy groups pertaining to particular interests. The use of the internet has allowed people to have access to information easily and has resulted in a better-informed public as well as creating a new sense of community for citizens.

== In the role of state government ==
People who serve state governments learn what the community needs through listening to citizens and thus make nuanced decisions. According to Miriam Porter, "turmoil, suspicion, and reduction of public trust" occur with the lack of communication. Civic engagement is closely linked to various state institutions. Values, knowledge, liberties, skills, ideas, attitudes, and beliefs the population holds are essential to civic engagement in terms of the representation of vast cultural, social, and economic identities.

Civic engagement applied within the state requires local civic engagement. Citizens are the basis of representative democracy. Application of this principle can be found within programs and laws that states have implemented based on a variety of areas concerning that particular state. Health, education, equality, immigration are a few examples of entities that civic engagement can shape within a state.

=== Application in health ===
States implement public health programs to better benefit the needs of society. The State Child Health Insurance Program (SCHIP), for example, is the largest public investment in child health care aiding over 12 million uninsured children in the United States. "This statewide health insurance program for low-income children was associated with improved access, utilization, and quality of care, suggesting that SCHIP has the potential to improve health care for low-income American children". States take part in the program and sculpt it to better fit the needs of that state's demographics, making their healthcare and the civic engagement process of individuals that take part in the program as well help reform and fix it as part of the state's identity.

=== In comparison with other countries ===
States practicing public involvement and implementing public health programs to better benefit the needs of the society is a concept that is shared by other countries, such as England. A study conducted by Department of Primary Care, University of Liverpool, the Department of Social Medicine, University of Bristol, the Department of Geography and Geology, McMaster Institute of Environment and Health, McMaster University, Avon Health Authority, the School of Journalism, Tom Hopkinson Centre for Media Research, Media and Cultural Studies, Cardiff University, and the Department of Clinical Epidemiology and Biostatistics, Centre for Health Economics and Policy Analysis, McMaster University stated that "There are a number of impulses towards public participation in health care decision making including instrumentalist, communitarian, educative and expressive impulses and the desire for increased accountability".

Their research included a critical examination of the degree of involvement by the public in healthcare decision making. It is suggested that "public participation in decision making can promote goals, bind individuals or groups together, impart a sense of competence and responsibility and help express political or civic identity". The action of the citizens aimed at influencing decisions of representatives ultimately affects the state as a whole. Voting is a key component in civic engagement for the voice of the masses to be heard.

Research done by Robert Putnam regarding the differences in social and civic engagement between northern and southern Italy since 1970 suggests that the presence of civic communities promotes political engagement by enhancing interest and education of political activities. According to data from the Civic Culture surveys, "members of associations displayed more political sophistication, social trust, and political participation." Sheri Berman's research done with the Weimar Republic in Germany following World War 1 suggests that civil engagement can be improved by increasing trust between people and political actors.

In foreign countries like Mozambique, Myanmar, Nigeria and Pakistan, where authoritarian governments are strictly in place and citizen engagement is most needed, political engagement is rare. Additionally, "levels of mass participation are confirmed to be significantly lower in autocracies". Many view common citizens engaging with politics as a "third force through which the traditional hierarchy of state and subject can be unseated." However, foreign groups of non-politicians that participate in political engagement can also include potentially disruptive groups such as "the Russian Mafia".

=== Importance of voter turnout ===
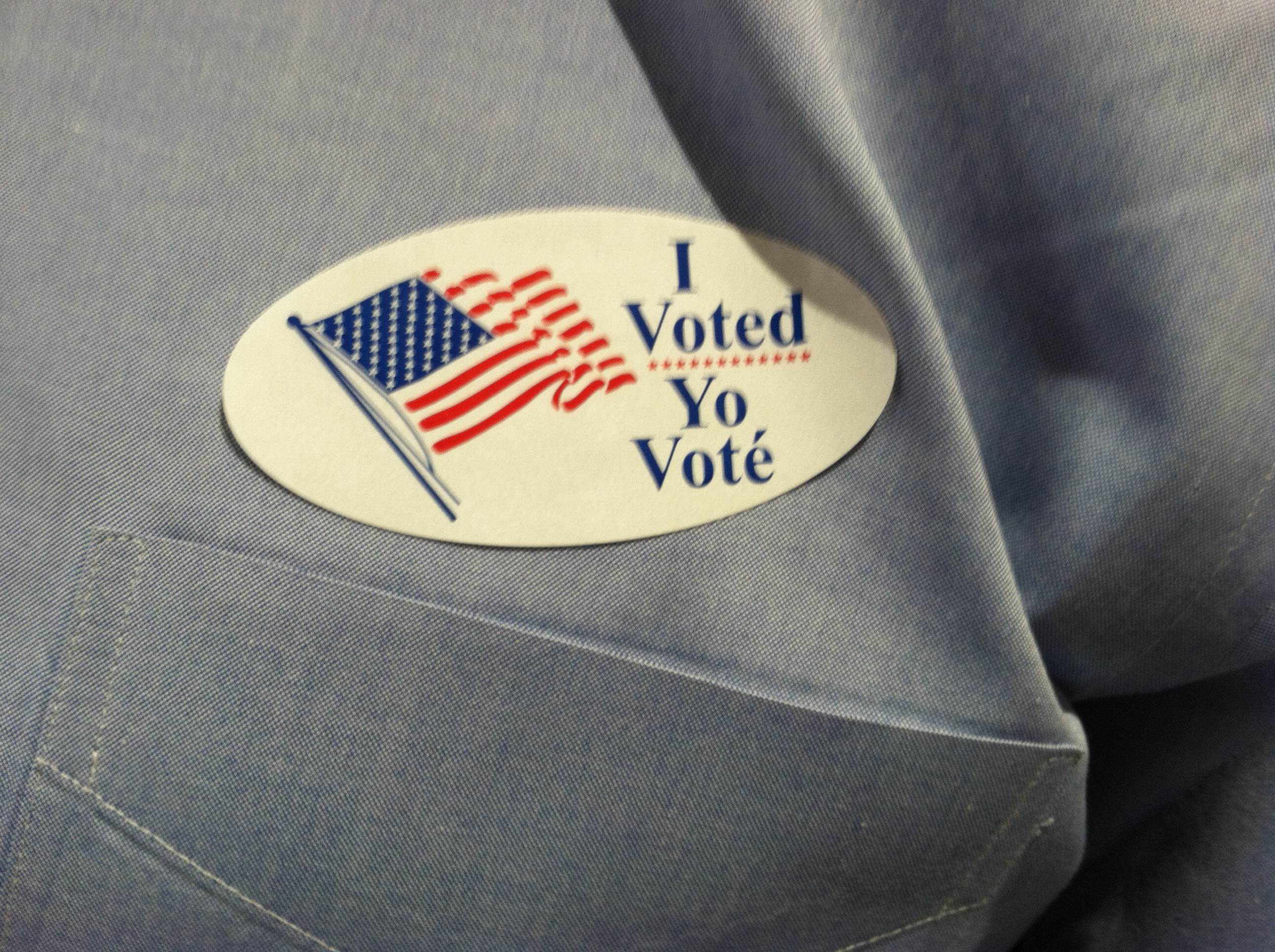
"I Voted" sticker

The goal for state government in elections is to promote civic engagement. Director Regina Lawrence of Annette Strauss Institute for Civic Life states "Politics and all other forms of engagement are really about trying to make your community, your state, and your nation a better place to live." Voter Turnout ensures civic engagement among the state with incentives that promises volunteer organizations, charity, and political involvement with everyone in the community who will have a voice to be heard.

The state can help promote civic engagement by ensuring fair voter and redistricting processes; by building partnerships among government agencies, non-profit organizations, and private citizens; and by maintaining networks of information about volunteer and charitable opportunities.

One of the main factors that determine civic engagement among the people is voter turnout. Voter turnout gauges citizens' level of political involvement, an important component of civic engagement—and a prerequisite for maintaining public accountability.

==== Example of high voter turnout ====
- The state can help promote civic engagement by ensuring fair voter and redistricting processes; by building partnerships among government agencies, non-profit organizations, and private citizens; and by maintaining networks of information about volunteer and charitable opportunities.
- Access to information about government activities, decision-making, solicit and use public input, and encourage public employees to donate and serve.

==== Example of low voter turnout ====
- Low participation with politics in the state and local government can result in less community involvement such as a lack of funding and leadership directed toward that issue of community involvement.

== In marginalized communities ==
Marginalized is defined as "to put or keep (someone) in a powerless or unimportant position within a society or group" according to Merriam-Webster. In diverse communities it is perceived that awareness and participation according to a study, using three different types of community service for the interaction between diverse individuals and understanding each other's perspective and enhancing relationships within the community. In addition, specifically black youth, there is an underlying gap of early civic education where there is lack of and where it thrives. According to Hope and Jagers, they studied civic engagement among black youth using data acquired from the Youth Culture Survey from the Black Youth Project. The assumption is that black youth who experience racial discrimination are fueled to be aware and participate in politics.

Another study by Chan describes the effect of the association of development and environmental factors among a group of at-risk youth such as African-Americans and Latino participants who come from low-income families that dwell in inner-city neighborhoods. Their research resulted in variations according to their participants as the racial minority youth were motivated and had aspiring goals for their futures due to early participation in civic engagement activities, but there was no sufficient evidence that this type of mindset will follow them into their adulthood. Looking into another oppressed group, Latinos, according to this report in the New York Times, states the number of Hispanics eligible to vote increased to an estimate of 10 million between 2000 and 2012, but there is a lack of taking an active approach toward dealing with the issues such as immigration and causing a stir within the Latino community. The Hispanic demographic is becoming a potential influence of power within political polls. To expand on another group that is oppressed is immigrant parents and their children in Jensen's study their concentration is on Asia and Latin America. In its study. they sampled a small group from a metropolitan area, the difference between both generations varies as the children who were in high school which is 87.5% were stated to be civically engaged. The parents were not civically engaged in issues but developed "bicultural consciousness" such as sending money back to their original country of origin and these participants saw it as their duty in their current state of opportunity to be civically engaged.

== Technology ==
=== Types ===
==== Television use ====
Social capital has been on the decline for years and Putnam looked into why this is. One of the areas the study covered was television and its effects on social and civic engagements. Shah writes that Putnam found the more TV a person watches, the less they are active in outside activities. This is shown with the rise of TV in the 1960s and the fall of civic engagements. They found that though news and educational programming can actually aide in a citizen's knowledge, but the lack of engaging in outside activities and social events hurts civic engagement in general.

Today, the internet has become a primary medium for social interaction and political communication. Xenos and Moy found that the internet can support civic engagement but may also produce “unjustifiable euphoria, abrupt and equally unjustifiable skepticism, and gradual realization that web-based human interaction really does have unique and politically significant properties”. Access to information about political candidates has increased significantly through digital media, contributing to a more informed public; however, the spread of misinformation can also generate polarized or conflicting opinions.

In relation to civic engagement and television use, there has been a push for civic engagement from television providers themselves. On September 22, 2020, WarnerMedia launched a nonpartisan voter engagement resource center, with the hopes of giving more citizens the access to vote and better understanding on how to do so.

==== E-services ====
The Knight Foundation outlines four different ways technology can assist in civic engagement. The four different ways include upgrading and providing e-services, making information more transparent, allowing e-democracy, and a service they call co-production. E-services would allow digital technologies to improve the efficiency of urban services within a city. This would allow the services to become more effective as well as give the public a way to get involved. E-democracy and co-production would work by allowing citizens to shape public policy by allowing them to partake in actions through technology. The Knight Foundation claims technology can make information more transparent, allowing the public to access the information and get involved.

==== Social entrepreneurship ====
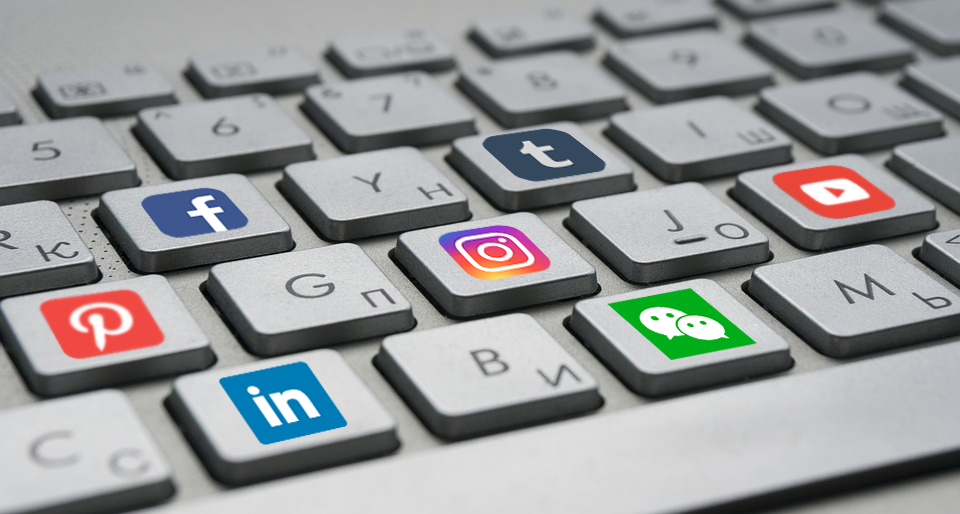
Social media platforms as channels for citizen discussions and for governments to reach audiences

Social entrepreneurship has seen a major increase in activity in recent years. One example can be seen from Eric Gordon and Jessica Philippi, who released a study on their interactive online game for local engagement called Community PlanIt (CPI). The purpose of CPI is to improve civic engagement qualitatively, rather than focusing on increasing the number of citizens getting involved. The study concluded that CPI encourages reflective attitudes and mediates relationships of trust that are needed for functional and continued civic engagement.

==== Social media ====
There are handfuls of studies and journals that focus on the impact that social media has on civic engagement. In a study mentioned in a later section on civic engagement around the world, interviewees from Norway "generally use Facebook to invite people to some form of face-to-face meeting at the beginning of a community engagement – and to facilitate the ongoing engagement of participants". Additional research demonstrates the capabilities of Facebook and other social networks in their enablement of civic participation. In Asia, a study was conducted focusing on the impact that the rise of Internet communication had on social capital. This study concluded that, while the Internet's role is to provide citizens with more opportunities to contact each other, it does not play a role in increasing different measures of social capital such as trust. Furthermore, the study concluded that "social capital developed through voluntary participation in social organization has the greatest effectiveness in promoting all sorts of civic engagement".

=== Defining factors ===
Efficiency and trust are observed to be the two main logics to effectively improve the effectiveness of the practical application of citizen technology in government projects. Communities can build consensus by reinforcing these two factors, reducing people's antipathy to public officials and social programs without removing legitimate skepticism, and reducing the distance that information barriers create when transmitting data. The confidentiality and security of civic technologies are factors in determining whether online public conversations are supported and popularized by the public.

Local technology has three levels of transformation and dynamic models, from information to participation and empowerment. Web portals, social media platforms, and mobile apps are effective models for reaching a wide range of audiences; Electronic monitoring and management, service efficiency improvement, and business training help ensure increased participation and smooth operation. Open and transparent feedback and data release are factors that encourage future engagement and data accuracy. Completion of this series of information transmission and summary promotes the improvement of the future civic participation model. Future government programs will be citizen-oriented, information-technology-themed, and measured by efficiency and clarity. Besides, citizen audit provides grassroots organizers with a more durable and stable cooperative structure and strategic shift. It is a method to test the effectiveness of policies and get feedback from citizens, and it can effectively point out deficiencies in current policies and systems.

== Around the world ==
=== Norway ===
A study on "Local Newspapers, Facebook and Local Civic Engagement" by Malene Paulsen Lie in Norway aimed to "[investigate] how a selection of the inhabitants of two Norwegian communities make use of the local press and Facebook..." and concluded that "both Facebook and the local press play important roles in civic engagement", illustrating the various mediums that citizens utilize. When looking at the demographics of each medium, this study also saw that the younger demographic strayed from local newspapers and preferred national or international news, while the older demographic prioritized the local newspaper.

=== Poland ===
In Poland, social media plays an important role in the level of civic engagement for mayoral elections. A study concluded that "successful engagement in social media accounts is also higher when the mayor operates in an active social media environment".

=== Australia ===
In Australia, a study was conducted, recognizing various forms of civic engagement such as "social protest and collective action, and specific organizations dedicated to lobbying and advocacy". The study goes on to say that governments in Australia generally prefer to initiate processes of consultation of their own choosing rather than being perceived to be consulting only in response to pressure and social protest".

=== South East Asia ===
In South East Asia, a study was conducted focusing on civic engagement within mental health services, more specifically in low and middle-income countries (LMICs). In these countries, the study concluded that civic engagement interventions can be successfully implemented yet Western models should be adapted in order to better fit with local cultures and values. Furthermore, the communities in these LMICs that face armed conflict, natural disasters, or political suppression find community cohesion to be a common outcome of civic engagement initiatives. Focusing on the mental health impact, civic engagement allowed citizens to develop a better understanding of the problems and equip themselves with the necessary skills to meet the needs of their local mental health problems. The study refers to the 2004 Asian Tsunami crisis, where "trusted community volunteers played a key role in the delivery of much needed mental health services".

=== China ===
In China, participatory budgeting experiments, an example of civic empowerment including all members of society, promote a degree of transparency and fairness, as a vast majority of the budgeting takes place at local levels and smaller villages (He). In the next decade, China and the NPC plans to implement more participatory budgeting experiments and an increased amount of participation from citizens. However, the empowerment of local People's Congresses will remain constrained by the caution of the central leaders and resistance from local governments. In this same way, the government will remain controlling over citizen empowerment.

=== Romania ===
There are countries, like Romania, where new technologies have started to influence civic participation. New media is a factor in increasing civic mobilization for the new generations. New studies on this topic are conducted at the Center for Civic Participation and Democracy (CPD) from SNSPA, a unit of research, analysis, and evaluation of citizen participation in the democratic process, both at the national and European level. Created at the National School of Political Science and Public Administration, CPD brings together experts in areas such as political science, sociology, administrative sciences, communications, international relations, and European studies, and it objectifies the SNSPA role and status of the school of governance. It is run by Remus Pricopie and Dan Sultanescu.

== Role of higher education ==
It can be argued that a fundamental step in creating a functioning society begins with the civic education of children within the community. According to Diann Cameron Kelly, "When our young children serve their communities through volunteerism, political participation or through vocal activism, they are more likely to emerge...voting and serving all aspects of society". Kelly argues that children should be taught how their community works and who chooses the rules we live by even before they enter school. Other voices maintain that civic education is a lifelong process, even for those who make decisions on behalf of the citizens they serve.

To answer this challenge, the incorporation of service-learning into collegiate course design has gained acceptance as a pedagogy that links curricular content with civic education. In a recent study, students who participated in service learning even one time appear to have made gains in knowledge of and commitment to civic engagement when compared to non-service learners. Campus Compact, a coalition of nearly 1200 college presidents (as of 2013) promotes the development of citizenship skills by creating community partnerships and providing resources to train faculty to integrate civic and community-based learning into the curriculum. Building on the acceptance of service learning and civic engagement in higher education, The Carnegie Foundation for the Advancement in Teaching created the Political Engagement Project in 2003 to develop the political knowledge and skills of college-aged students. The American Democracy Project (ADP) was launched in the same year by the American Association of State Colleges and Universities (AASCU). The American Democracy Project was joined by the American Democracy Commitment, a partnership of community colleges, to sponsor an annual national conference focused on higher education's role in preparing the next generation of informed, engaged citizens. The American Democracy Project also sponsors campus-based initiatives including voter registration, curriculum revision projects, and special days of action and reflection, such as the MLK Day of Service. In a report entitled, A Crucible Moment: College Learning and Democracy's Future issued in 2012 by the National Task Force on Civic Learning and Democratic Engagement, a joint project of the U.S. Department of Education and the American Association of Colleges and Universities, the authors argue that higher education must serve as an intellectual incubator and socially responsible partner in advancing civic learning and democratic engagement.

The report recommends four basic steps to build civic minded institutions:

1. Foster a civic ethos across the campus culture.
2. Make civic literacy a core expectation for all students.
3. Practice civic inquiry across all fields of study.
4. Advance civic action through transformative partnerships.

These education-based initiatives endeavor to build in college students, a politically engaged identity while enhancing the capacity to evaluate the political landscape and make informed decisions about participation in a democracy. As evidenced by the growth in coalitions, professional development opportunities and civic education research, institutions of higher education and their association partners are committed to help prepare the next generation of citizens.

Many universities, like the University of Minnesota, have begun to focus on increasing the civic engagement of students and have mandated that educators begin incorporating it into several school activities. Edwin Fogelman, author of Civic Engagement at the University of Minnesota, states that true civic engagement can only be practiced by those living within a Democracy. According to Fogelman, civic engagement is largely shaped by schools. Education institutions have the skills to foster "civic competence, critical thinking, and Public Spirit, which empower citizens to become engaged". Many claim that civic engagement ought to become part of the curriculum and that higher education institutions should provide opportunities to become engaged such as internships, service-learning, and community based activities. Institutions also need to provide outlets where students can have open discussions over concerns and controversial issues.

Some schools, such as Widener University, have made civic engagement a core goal of the university. The university strives to get students involved in the local community to become more aware and civically engaged.

=== Civic learning ===
In January 2012, the U.S. Department of Education issued a road map titled Advancing Civic Learning and Engagement in Democracy that offers nine steps to enhancing the Department of Education's commitment to civic learning and engagement in democracy.

These steps include:

1. Convene and catalyze schools and post-secondary institutions to increase and enhance high-quality civic learning and engagement
2. Identify additional civic indicators
3. Identify promising practices in civic learning and democratic engagement—and encourage further research to learn what works
4. Leverage federal investments and public-private partnerships
5. Encourage community-based work-study placements
6. Encourage public service careers among college students and graduates
7. Support civic learning for a well-rounded K–12 curriculum
8. Engage historically black colleges and universities and other minority-serving institutions—including Hispanic-serving institutions, Asian American and Native American Pacific Islander–Serving Institutions, and tribal colleges and universities-in a national dialogue to identify best practices.
9. Highlight and promote student and family participation in education programs and policies at the federal and local levels

Civic learning, however, also has its challenges. From W. Lance Bennett's Young Citizens and New Media, the challenge of civic education and learning is the integration and adaptation to the more contemporary attitude toward politics, which revolves more around the quality of personal life, social recognition, and self esteem.

=== Youth participation ===
Research shows the ways that institutions shape young people's participation. Studies from the Center for Information & Research on Civic Learning and Engagement (CIRCLE) demonstrate that youth engagement depends on school access, and civic opportunities. Schools tend to play an important role in developing civic skills and identities. Other researchers such as Hess and McAvoy's demonstrate how civic engagement and learning create civic spaces. These spaces are used to provide experiences of discussions, and democratic participation. This encourages students to engage in political issues or discussions. Therefore, this creates a long term opportunity for civic engagement. However youth civic engagement can be impacted by the opportunity gap.

Youth participation has a critical impact on four aspects: democratic decision-making, community cohesion, equity, and personal development of youth themselves. Domestic and transnational educational cooperation is conducive to sharing and promoting the transmission and popularization of information and may achieve the effect of promoting social advancement and improving the living conditions of citizens and the environment. Public services and programs contribute to the mental development of rebellious and vulnerable youth groups and change government patterns in the future, as they mobilize the participation of the next generation of citizens. These educational programs aim to apply social science and psychology to stimulate the enthusiasm of the youth community to participate in government projects, thereby promoting the sustainable development of society.

The design of such government projects remains neutral and open. It remains controversial whether the government has the right to guide teenagers to accept education of this nature. Experts suggest first identifying topics students value, followed by selecting a topic to discuss concrete actions and short-term goals that can be implemented and concluding with feedback and a summary. Teachers are encouraged to validate students' ideas and avoid bringing personal opinions and political stances into the classrooms.

The general attitude of college students towards online civic responsibility, engagement, learning, and expression is positive. The government may consider the option of strengthening the sense of autonomy of college students in performing their civic duties in reducing the inequalities that currently exist in the K–12 education system. As part of the education system, college students may create accessible participation platforms for vulnerable groups and more through their educational resources or to speak for these groups through community visits and in-depth conversations.

== As a normative and exclusionary discourse ==
Despite its seemingly inclusive and democratic appeal, civic engagement operates as a deeply normative and ideologically loaded concept. Its definitional vagueness facilitates instrumental use: rather than analytically capturing diverse forms of civic participation, it often serves to classify citizens into "good" and "bad", engaged and disengaged. Within this framework, a lack of civic engagement is frequently interpreted as an individual moral, cognitive, or cultural deficit, obscuring the structural barriers to participation rooted in social, economic, gendered, or territorial inequalities. As a result, civic engagement discourse contributes to the normalization of symbolic boundaries that delineate legitimate participation in the public sphere, enabling the stigmatization and disciplining of particular social groups. Paradoxically, a concept mobilized to strengthen democracy may thus function in undemocratic ways—less as an analytical tool for understanding the conditions of civic action, and more as a normative framework for evaluating, delegitimizing, and excluding social actors.

== See also ==
- Center for Engaged Democracy
- Civic courage
- Civic society
- Civic virtue
- Civics
- Civil conscription
- Civil society
- Common good
- Community building
- Community development
- Democracy Day in various countries
- Duty
- European Local Democracy Week
- International Day of Democracy
- Social capital
- Social engagement
- UK Parliament Week
- Youth empowerment
