= Democracy Day (Canada) =

Democracy Day is a project initiated by Fair Vote Canada "to celebrate and reflect upon Canadian democracy."

On August 2, 2011, Fair Vote Canada launched Democracy Day and Democracy Week in Canada annual events encouraging participation, education, and celebration of Canadian democracy. In its first year events were held by different groups in cities across Canada. Fair Vote Canada designated Democracy Day to be Canada's celebration of the United Nations International Day of Democracy and Democracy Week to be the seven-day calendar week in which Democracy Day falls (September 15 each year). A number of Canadian non-profit and governmental organizations participate in and promote the events, including Elections Canada.

== See also ==
- Democracy Day in other countries
- UK Parliament Week
