= Nigerian people in Spain =

- (Spain) (Nigeria)
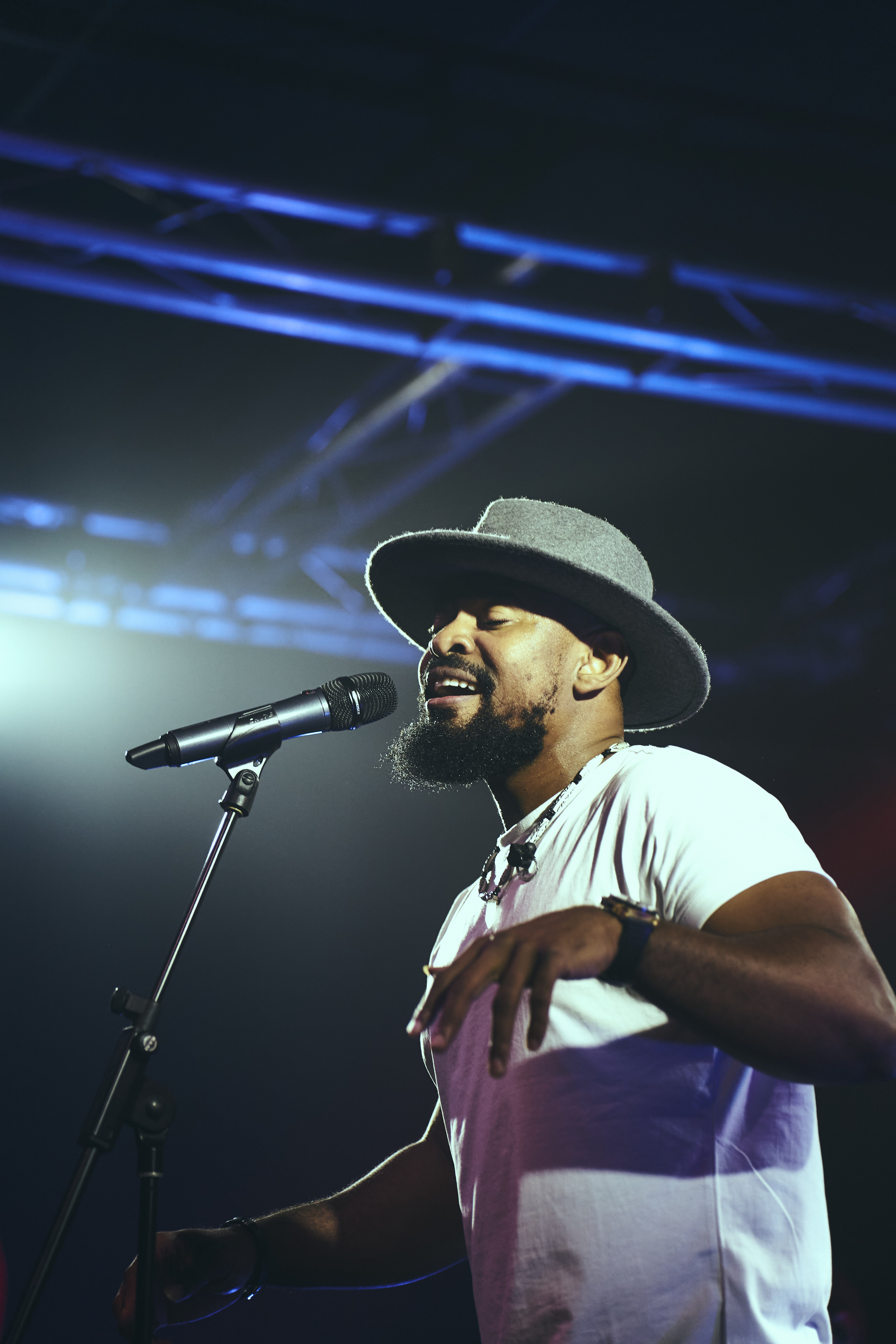
Attih Soul

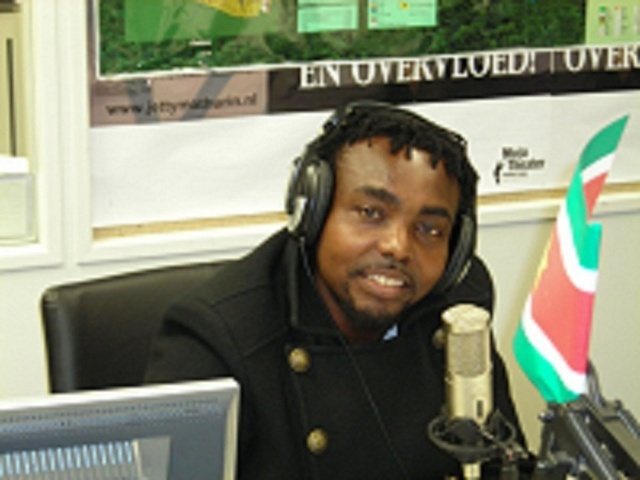
Dareysteel

Total population
- 36,367 (INE: 2022)

Regions with significant populations
- Community of Madrid · Catalonia · Andalusia · Basque Country

Languages
- English (Nigerian English) · Spanish (Peninsular Spanish) · Other languages of Nigeria

Religion
- Protestantism · Catholic Church · Sunni Islam

Nigerians in Spain are people born in the Federal Republic of Nigeria or holders of Nigerian nationality who reside in the Kingdom of Spain. In 2024, it was ranked among the 10 largest Nigerian communities abroad.

== Overview ==
Concentrated mainly in urban areas, this community has grown steadily since the early 2000s. The number of Nigerian citizens residing in the country rose from 3,320 in 2000 to 36,367 in 2022, according to data recorded by the National Statistics Institute of Spain. These figures exclude stateless individuals and those who have acquired Spanish nationality. The total number is estimated at around 70,000 people. During the 2010s, Spain became an entry point for asylum seekers from Africa to the European Union (EU), especially due to its geographical location for those arriving in Europe by sea.

For some Nigerian migrants in Spain, regularizing their immigration status has historically presented challenges, as Spanish authorities require all foreigners to submit an up-to-date criminal record certificate when applying for a residence permit. However, the Nigerian government issues this certificate only if applicants appear in person at a local police station. To address this logistical obstacle, special Nigerian police commissions were occasionally dispatched to Spain to collect fingerprints and facilitate the issuance of criminal record certificates for applicants.

Regarding crime, both Spanish and Nigerian authorities have undertaken efforts to enhance bilateral cooperation on security matters, sharing information to prevent and combat illicit activities such as human trafficking, illegal drug trade, and organized crime.

== Notable people ==
- Attih Soul, singer, musician and songwriter
- Peter Rufai, football player
- Dareysteel, rapper, singer-songwriter, and record producer

== See also ==
- Afro-Spaniards
- Nigeria–Spain relations
- Nigerian people in Italy
