= European Local Democracy Week =

The “European Local Democracy Week” is an annual event with national and local events organised by participating local authorities in all Council of Europe member States. The purpose is to foster the knowledge of local democracy and promote the idea of democratic participation at a local level. While the week is overseen by the Council of Europe, it is each local and regional community which organizes events centered on the selected theme.

== Background ==
The week of October 15 is chosen every year for European Local Democracy Week as the European Charter of Local Self-Government was opened for signature by member states on that date in 1985 and the date is considered symbolic for European Local Democracy. In recognition of the fiftieth anniversary of the creation of the Conference of Local and Regional Authorities (the predecessor to today's Congress of Local and Regional Authorities, the first European Local Democracy Week took place in 2007.

Each year has had a unique and relevant theme for each community to work with which are very important on the local level with past themes including the issue of Sustainability on the local level. The theme for the European Local Democracy Week in 2011 was human rights at the local level. While the themes are universal for all of the local and regional communities, each community can interpret the theme is a manner that is more relevant to their specific needs. Events and activities organized can include poster campaigns, interactive websites, public meetings, exchanges, Open Days or specifically targeted events for different groups of people like children.

The leading theme in 2012 was human rights make for more inclusive communities. In 2012, some 150 partners from 29 countries joined the ELDW. For the first time, municipalities in Morocco and Tunisia also registered as ELDW partners, in order to strengthen local democracy. A total of 342 activities and events were organised by towns, cities, regions, national and international associations. Motivating citizens to take part in decision-making processes at the grassroots level will be at the center of the 2013 edition of the European Local Democracy Week, under the leading theme “active citizenship: voting, sharing, participating”. This theme has been endorsed by the new ELDW Political Co-ordinator, Congress Vice-President and member of the Municipal Council of Dubrovnik (Croatia), Dubravka Suica, further to a co-ordination meeting assembling representatives of European cities, regions and associations.

Since 2013, the European Parliament has held an entirely separate event for members of national parliaments under the name "European Parliamentary Week".

== Purpose and main messages ==
While there are many goals and purposes behind the European Local Democracy Week, the primary ones are the following (as listed in the Council of Europe literature):

- to strengthen links between elected representative and their communities
- to boost participation in the democratic process
- to involve citizens in community affairs
- to increase their knowledge of local democratic institutions and processes
- to have local authorities that listen and understand the needs and expectations of their citizens
- to facilitate co-operation and the exchange of good practices between communities

The overriding messages to the annual event include:

- to raise awareness of European citizens of the workings of democracy in their communities
- to raise awareness of local councilors and their staff of citizens' needs and concerns
- to stress that local democracy is one of the major components for buildings a united and democratic Europe

== See also ==
- Civic engagement
- Democracy Day in other countries
- International Day of Democracy
- UK Parliament Week
