= Nigeria–Spain relations =

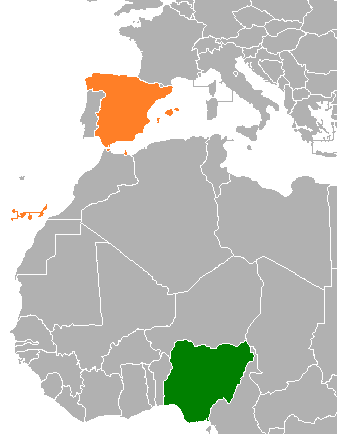

- Nigeria: Spain

Nigeria–Spain relations are the bilateral and diplomatic relations between these two countries. Nigeria has an embassy in Madrid. Spain has an embassy in Abuja and a consulate-general in Lagos.

== Diplomatic relations ==
Spain considers the West African region as a priority for its foreign policy and recognizes the position of relevance that Nigeria occupies in the area.

Cooperation in the police field is especially satisfactory for both parties, who collaborate in the fight against illegal immigration, holding meetings on the subject and numerous exchanges, such as participation in various seminars and conferences in Spain by experts of the Nigerian Immigration Service (NIS) and the National Agency for the fight against Trafficking in Persons (NAPTIP).

From a military point of view, in the framework of the Africa Plan and the Defense Diplomacy Plan, between 2011 and the first half of 2012, three Spanish Navy patrols visited Nigeria (and other countries in the area), to carry out joint military operations and participate in training and training activities for local marine personnel.

In the cultural field, Spain has gained visibility thanks to the annual organization by the Embassy of the Spanish Cultural Week, which celebrated its 10th edition in October 2015. This event allows to strengthen relations with Nigeria, more specifically with the Ministry of Tourism, Culture and National Orientation as well as with the different cultural institutions that depend on said Ministry, while promoting young local and Spanish talents.

There has also been interest on the part of Spanish companies operating in the country, as well as local companies, in sponsoring this activity.

There are already consolidated ties with the representatives of the Nigerian film industry, second worldwide in production volume, and with different local publishers. In the last 2–3 years, the world of photography has gained importance in the country, a field in which Spain also collaborates.

Despite Spanish not being a recognized subject field at any Nigerian university, there are some academies that teach the language. In 2014, the Spanish Embassy in Abuja was recognized as an associate center for the conduct of DELE exams, and a first call for levels B1 and B2 was held on 22 November 2014.

== Economic relations ==
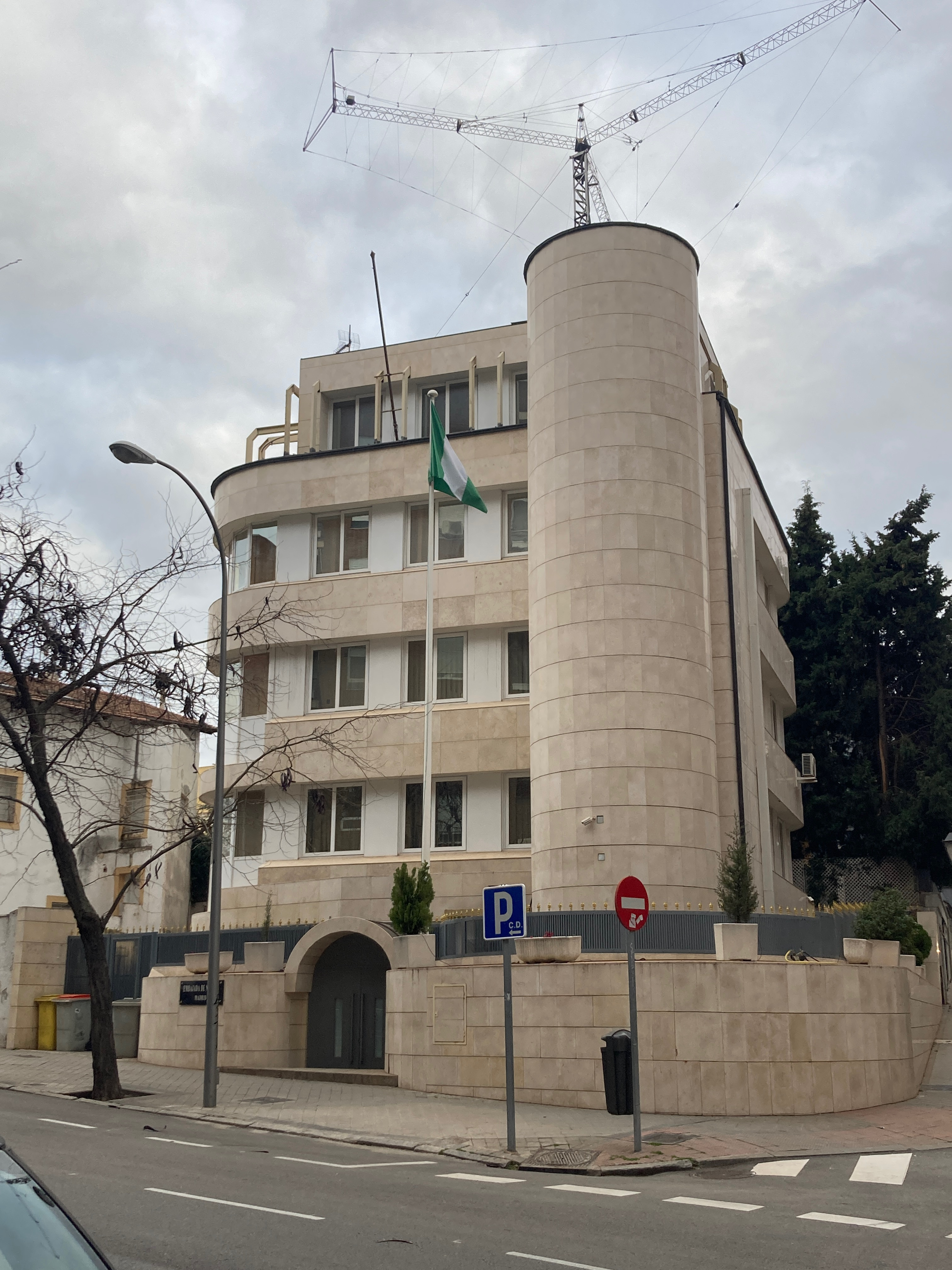
Embassy of Nigeria in Madrid

=== Institutional framework ===
In 2006, the Secretary of State for Tourism and Commerce made a visit to Nigeria, accompanied by businessmen, in order to support the interests of Spanish companies that want to make investments in the country. Thus, a Memorandum of Understanding on Economic Cooperation was signed between the Nigerian Minister of Commerce and the Secretary of State in the presence of President Obasanjo, with the objectives of exchanging information about investment possibilities, acquiring commitments to review and, where appropriate, suppress measures that hinder trade and investment, and explore new fields in order to diversify Spanish investment.

Since 2006, the Reciprocal Investment Protection and Promotion Agreement (APPRI) is in force. Among its most notable aspects is the establishment of an arbitration procedure in case of conflict. In 2009, during the visit of the President of the Government of Spain, accompanied by numerous businessmen, the Agreement to Avoid Double Taxation was signed.

=== Commercial exchanges ===
Spain is one of Nigeria's best customers thanks to crude oil imports. In 2014, it was the second best customer for the purchase of 6,500 million euros of oil and gas. Oil accounts for 76.2% of Nigeria's Spanish imports and Natural Gas another 22%.

Regarding exports, although there has been a considerable increase in recent years, from €185 million in 2007 to €342 million in 2011, Spain's market share is small. However, in some sectors, the Spanish market share is high, such as ceramic products (21.2%), beverages (12.5%), mechanical devices (6.9%) or coloring materials and paint (5.5%).

Exports show greater diversification, although 40% are referred to petroleum products. Other relevant exports are plastics, machinery, ceramic products, pipes for gas pipelines, frozen fish, paper, automobile accessories and pharmaceutical products. Due to heavy oil imports, the trade balance is traditionally very deficient for Spain and the coverage rate is usually at 7%.

== Cooperation ==
In the field of development aid Nigeria is not a priority country for Spanish cooperation. However, ECOWAS is, and through cooperation with this regional organization, several projects in Nigeria are financed in sectors such as agriculture, renewable energy, infrastructure, as well as in emigration and development. Spain has disbursed ECOWAS 150 million euros since 2009.

== See also ==
- Foreign relations of Nigeria
- Foreign relations of Spain
- Nigerian people in Spain
