= Democracy Day =

Democracy Day may refer to:

- International Day of Democracy, since 2007 the United Nations General Assembly decided to observe 15 September as the International Day of Democracy
- Democracy Day (Canada), project launched by Fair Vote Canada to "celebrate and reflect upon Canadian democracy"
- Democracy Day (Cape Verde), an annual public holiday in Cape Verde
- Democracy Day (Nigeria), June 12, for the return of democracy in Nigeria in 1999
- Democracy Day (United Kingdom), a day of events to mark the 750th anniversary of the first Parliament to include representatives of the people
- Democracy Day (United States), a proposed federal holiday corresponding to Election Day on even-numbered years

== See also ==
- UK Parliament Week
