= Center for Engaged Democracy =

The Center for Engaged Democracy is located within Merrimack College's School of Education. The center develops, coordinates, and supports academic programs around the country that are focused on civic and community engagement. The center supports such academic programs through a variety of initiatives for faculty, administrators, and community partners. There are currently over fifty academic programs focused on community engagement.

== History ==
The center was founded in 2010 by Dan Sarofian-Butin. His research and academic work for over five years has been focused on the argument for the institutionalization of community engagement in higher education. He says that we need to reconceptualize the service-learning movement as an intellectual movement to make meaningful connections between colleges and communities and expand on the notion of an engaged campus. This shows the need to develop an "academic home" meaning academic programs such as majors, minors, certificates and interdisciplinary programs. His research is the reason for the development of this central research and action hub to develop, coordinate, and support academic programs that are focused on community engagement.

== Center initiatives ==
=== Compilation ===
The center is currently compiling existing research and documentation to support new and developing programs. The document repository has the following resources:

- Strategic Planning Resources
- Course Catalog Resource
- Key Texts in Community Engagement
- Syllabus Resource

The repository is currently housed on the Center for Engaged Democracy website.

=== Core competencies initiative ===
An outcome of the 3rd Annual Summer Institute was a working paper in the Center for Engaged Democracy's Policy Papers Series, entitled Core Competencies In Civic Engagement. Developed by individuals from seven institutions and organizations the working paper synthesizes existing program competencies and resources for the community engagement field. The goal of this initiative remains to distill common competencies and propose a suggested list of core competencies for academic programs. The Core Competencies specifically address the following questions:

- What are the learning outcomes for academic programs in "community engagement"?
- What knowledge, skills, and dispositions should students have demonstrated by the end of their academic programs?
- How should these competencies differ across diverse programs – certificates, minors, and majors?

=== Summer conference ===
The center sponsors a yearly summer research institute for departments and academic programs. This conference brings together scholars, students, and community participants to engage critical questions of what it means in higher education to have an “academic home” for community engagement. In June 2011, the 2nd Annual Summer Research Institute hosted Keynote Speaker Benjamin Barber. The 3rd annual summer conference was held on June 23–24 at the campus of Merrimack College.

=== Research opportunities ===
In September 2011, the center had a call for proposals for research on academic programs in community engagement. This request was to advance the research on academic programs in community engagement.

Rick Battistoni (Providence College), Arthur Keene (University of Massachusetts Amherst), Tania Mitchell (Stanford University), and John Reiff (University of Massachusetts Amherst) received the center's first research grant. Their research project is called Educating for Democratic Leadership in Three Multi-Year, Development, Cohort-Based Civic Engagement Programs. This project will investigate the long-term impacts of sustained, developmental community action programs at Providence College, Stanford University and the University of Massachusetts to understand how these programs influence civic identity and civic action and promote democratic leadership after college. Their findings will be presented at the 2012 summer research institute

== Advisory board ==
- Liz Hollander is a senior fellow at Tisch College at Tufts University.
- Ari Hoy is vice president for program and resource development for the Bonner Foundation.
- Peter Levine is director of CIRLCE, The Center for Information and Research on Civic Learning and Engagement, and is research director of Tufts University's Jonathan Tisch College of Citizenship and Public Service.
- Elizabeth Minnich is a senior scholar, Association of American Colleges & Universities: Office of Diversity, Equity, and Global Initiatives.
- Aaron Schutz is associate professor and chair of the Department of Educational Policy and Community Studies at University of Vermont.
- Byron White is the vice president for university engagement at Cleveland State University.

== Dan Sarofian-Butin ==
Dan Sarofian-Butin is the founder of the Center for an Engaged Democracy and the founding dean of the School of Education and an associate professor at Merrimack College. He is also the editor and author of more than sixty academic publications. His research focuses on community engagement and also issues of education preparation and policy. Prior to working in higher education, Butin was a middle school math and science teacher and the chief financial officer of Teach for America.
