= Simon de Montfort's Parliament =

English parliament of 1265

Simon de Montfort's Parliament was an English parliament held from 20 January 1265 until mid-March of the same year, called by Simon de Montfort, a baronial rebel leader.

Montfort had seized power in England following his victory over Henry III at the Battle of Lewes during the Second Barons' War, but his grip on the country was under threat. To gain more support, he summoned not only the barons and the knights of the shires, as in previous parliaments, but also burgesses from the major towns. They discussed radical reforms and temporarily stabilised Montfort's political situation. Montfort was killed at the Battle of Evesham later that year, but the idea of inviting both knights and burgesses to parliaments became more popular under Henry's son Edward I. By the 14th century, it had become the norm, with the gathering becoming known as the House of Commons.

== Background ==
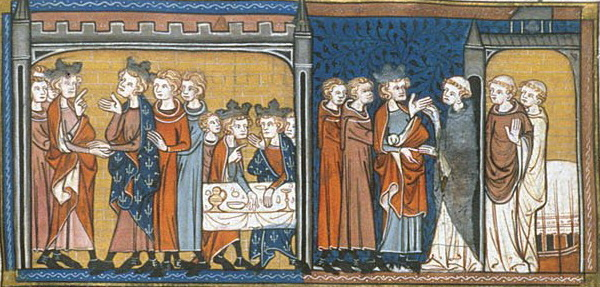
14th-century representation of Henry III of England visiting Louis IX of France during the Second Barons' War

In 1258, King Henry III of England faced a revolt among the English barons. Anger had grown about the way the King's officials were raising funds, the influence of his Poitevin relatives at court and his unpopular Sicilian policy; even the English Church had grievances over its treatment by the King. Within Henry's court there was a strong feeling that the King would be unable to lead the country through these problems. On 30 April, Hugh Bigod marched into Westminster in the middle of the King's parliament, backed by his co-conspirators, including Simon de Montfort, the Earl of Leicester, and carried out a coup d'état. Henry, fearful that he was about to be arrested and imprisoned, agreed to abandon his policy of personal rule and instead govern through a council of 24 barons and churchmen, half chosen by the King and half by the barons.

The pressure for reform continued to grow unabated and a parliament met in June. The term "parliament" had first appeared in the 1230s and 1240s to describe large gatherings of the royal court, and parliamentary gatherings were held periodically throughout Henry's reign. They were used to agree upon the raising of taxes which, in the 13th century, were single, one-off levies, typically on movable property, intended to support the King's normal revenues for particular projects. During Henry's reign, the counties had begun to send regular delegations to these parliaments, and came to represent a broader cross-section of the community than simply the major barons.

The new parliament passed a set of measures known as the Provisions of Oxford, which Henry swore to uphold. These provisions created a smaller council of 15 members, elected solely by the barons, which then had the power to appoint England's justiciar, chancellor and treasurer, and which would be monitored through triennial parliaments. Pressure from the lesser barons and the gentry present at Oxford also helped to push through wider reform, intended to limit the abuse of power by both the King's officials and the major barons. More radical measures were passed by the new council the next year, in the form of the Provisions of Westminster.

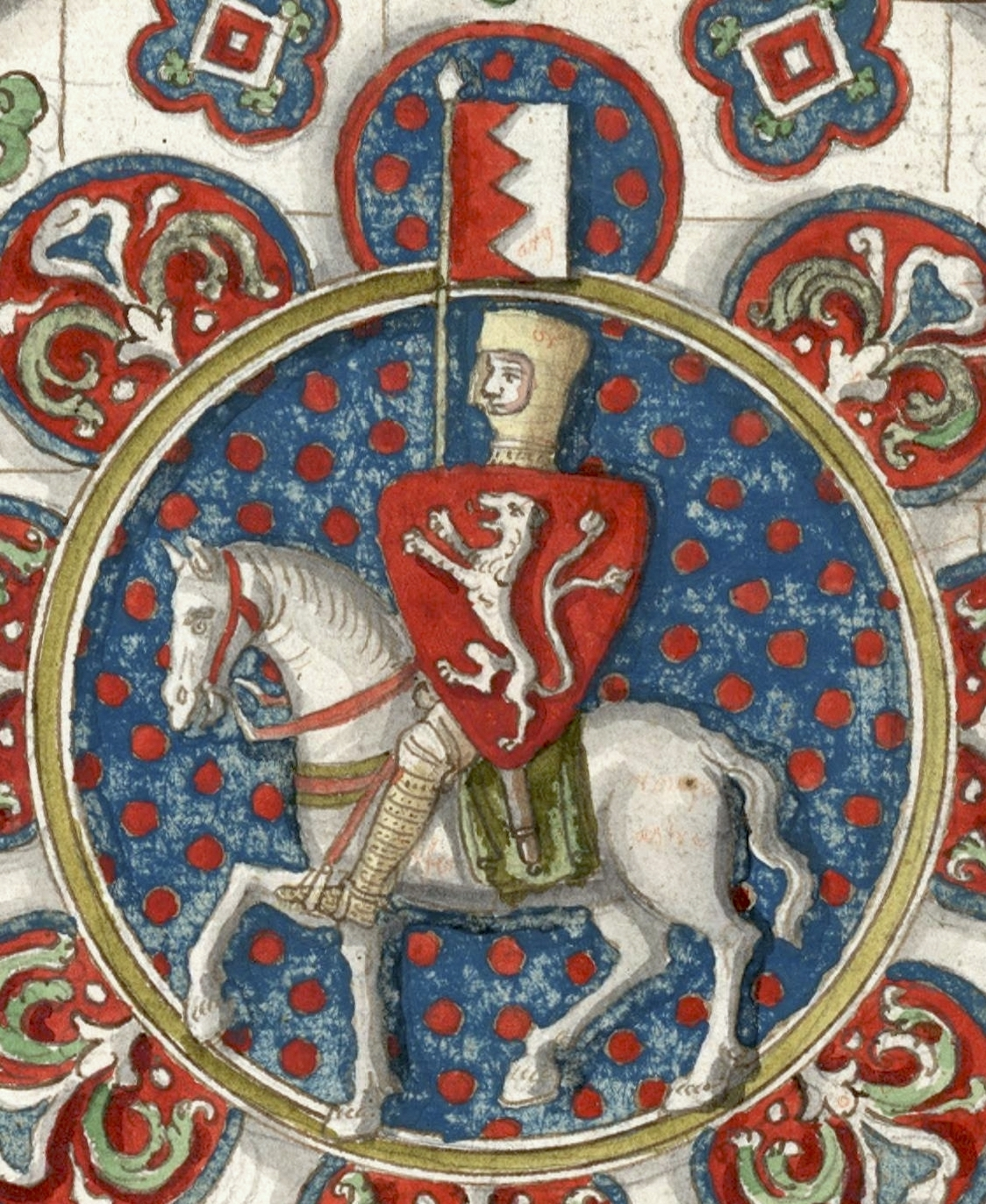
Simon de Montfort, in a stained glass window at Chartres Cathedral

The disagreements between the leading barons involved in the revolt soon became evident. Montfort championed radical reforms that would place further limitations on the authority and power of the major barons as well as the Crown; others promoted only moderate change, while the conservative barons expressed concerns about the existing limitations on the King's powers. Over the next four years, neither Henry nor the barons were able to restore stability in England, and power swung back and forth between the different factions. By early 1263, what remained of Henry's authority had disintegrated and the country slipped back towards open civil war. Montfort convened a council of rebel barons in Oxford to pursue his radical agenda and by October, England faced a likely civil war. Montfort marched east with an army and London rose up in revolt. Montfort took Henry and Queen Eleanor prisoner, and although he maintained a fiction of ruling in Henry's name, the rebels completely replaced the royal government and household with their own, trusted men.

Montfort's coalition began to quickly fragment, Henry regained his freedom of movement and renewed chaos spread across England. Henry appealed to his brother-in-law Louis of France for arbitration in the dispute; Montfort was initially hostile to this idea, but, as war became more likely again, he decided to agree to French arbitration as well. Initially Montfort's legal arguments held sway, but in January 1264, Louis announced the Mise of Amiens, condemning the rebels, upholding the King's rights and annulling the Provisions of Oxford. The Second Barons' War finally broke out in April, when Henry led an army into Montfort's territories. Becoming desperate, Montfort marched in pursuit of Henry and the two armies met at the Battle of Lewes on 14 May. Despite their numerical superiority, Henry's forces were overwhelmed. Captured, Henry was forced to pardon the rebel barons and reinstate the Provisions of Oxford, leaving him, as historian Adrian Jobson describes, "little more than a figurehead".

== Parliament ==
Simon de Montfort claimed to be ruling in the King's name through a council of officials. However, he had effective political control over the government even though he was not himself the monarch, the first time this had happened in English history. Montfort successfully held a parliament in London in June 1264 to confirm new constitutional arrangements for England; two knights were summoned from each county, chosen by the county court, and were allowed to comment on general matters of state – the first time this had occurred. Montfort was unable to consolidate his victory at Lewes, however, and widespread disorder persisted across the country. In France, Eleanor made plans for an invasion of England with the support of Louis.

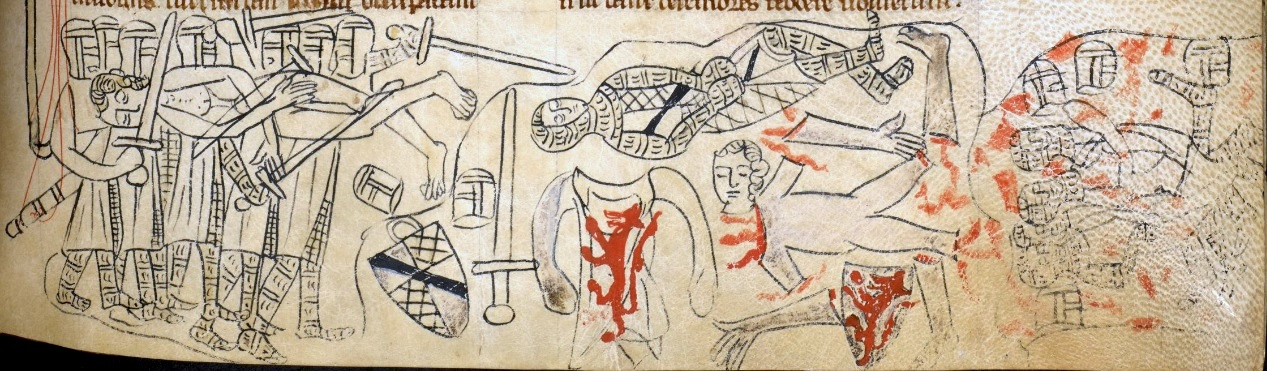
A 13th-century depiction of the mutilation of Simon de Montfort's body following the Battle of Evesham in 1265

In response, and hoping to win wider support for his government, Montfort summoned a new parliament for 20 January 1265 which continued until mid March that year. It was held at short notice, with the summons being issued on 14 December, leaving little time for attendees to respond. He summoned not only the nobility, senior churchmen and two knights from each county, but also two burgesses from each of the major towns such as York, Lincoln, Sandwich, and the Cinque Ports, the first time this had been done. Due to the lack of support for Montfort among the nobility, only 23 of them were summoned to parliament, in comparison to the summons issued to 120 churchmen, who largely supported the new government; it is unknown how many burgesses were called. The event was overseen by King Henry, and held in the Palace of Westminster, just outside London, which was the largest city in England, and whose continuing loyalty was essential to Montfort's cause.

This parliament was a tactical move by Montfort in an attempt to gather support from the regions, and the historian Jeffrey Hamilton characterises it as "a very partisan assembly, not some sort of proto-democratic representative body". Once again the representatives were allowed to comment on wider political matters than just the usual issues of taxation. The business of the parliament focused on enforcing the Provisions of Westminster, in particular its restrictions on the major nobles, and promising judicial help to those who felt they were suffering from unfair feudal lordship.

The parliament bought temporary calm but opposition grew once more, particularly as Montfort and his immediate family began to amass a huge personal fortune. Prince Edward escaped his captors in May and formed a new army, resulting in a fresh outbreak of civil war. Edward pursued Montfort's forces through the Welsh Marches, before striking east to attack his fortress at Kenilworth and then turning once more on the rebel leader himself. Montfort, accompanied by the captive Henry, was unable to retreat and the Battle of Evesham ensued. Edward was triumphant and Montfort's corpse was mutilated by the victors. In places the now leaderless rebellion dragged on, with some rebels gathering at Kenilworth, which Henry and Edward took after a long siege in 1266. The remaining pockets of resistance were mopped up, and the final rebels, holed up on the Isle of Ely, surrendered in July 1267, marking the end of the war.

== Legacy ==
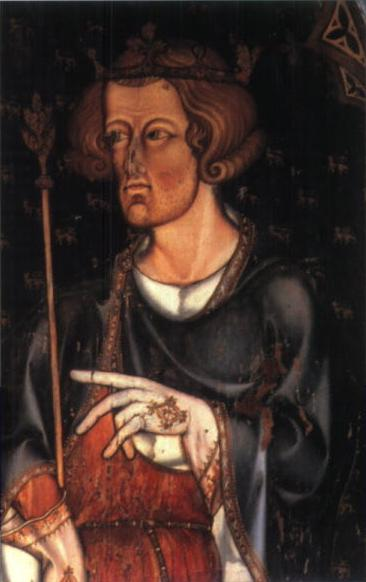
Portrait in Westminster Abbey, thought to be of Edward I

Henry III ruled England until his death in 1272, continuing to summon parliaments, sometimes including a number of knights of each shire and, once, including burgesses from the towns. After 1297 under Edward I's reign, this became the norm, and by the early 14th century it was normal to include the knights and burgesses, a grouping that would become known as the "Commons" of England and, ultimately, form the "House of Commons".

Simon de Montfort's parliament of 1265 is sometimes referred to as the first representative English parliament, because of its inclusion of both the knights and the burgesses, and Montfort himself is often regarded as the founder of the House of Commons. The 19th-century historian William Stubbs popularised the 1295 "Model Parliament" of Edward I as the first genuine parliament; however, modern scholarship questions this analysis. The historian David Carpenter describes Montfort's 1265 parliament as "a landmark" in the development of parliament as an institution during the medieval period.

=== Modern recognition ===
The Parliament of the United Kingdom presented a loyal address to Queen Elizabeth II in 1965 to mark the 700th anniversary of Montfort's Parliament, and the Queen addressed both Houses of Parliament. The House of Lords Record Office, now known as the Parliamentary Archives, organised an exhibition in the Houses of Parliament of several important Acts of Parliament. Some of these documents were displayed again in a 2015 exhibition.

In 2015, Parliament held a year-long programme of events called "Parliament in the Making", coordinated with Parliament Week, including events to mark the 750th anniversary of Montfort's Parliament. The BBC broadcast a "Democracy Day" on 20 January to coincide with the 750th anniversary consisting of live discussions and debate about parliament and democracy. It was presented in partnership with the Speaker's Office of the House of Commons, including broadcasts from inside the Palace of Westminster. Westminster Abbey held a special evensong on 22 January commemorating the anniversary of the Montfort parliament and the development of rights and representation.

== See also ==
- Duration of English parliaments before 1660
- History of democracy
- List of parliaments of England
