= Parliament in the Making =

Series of events in the UK parliament

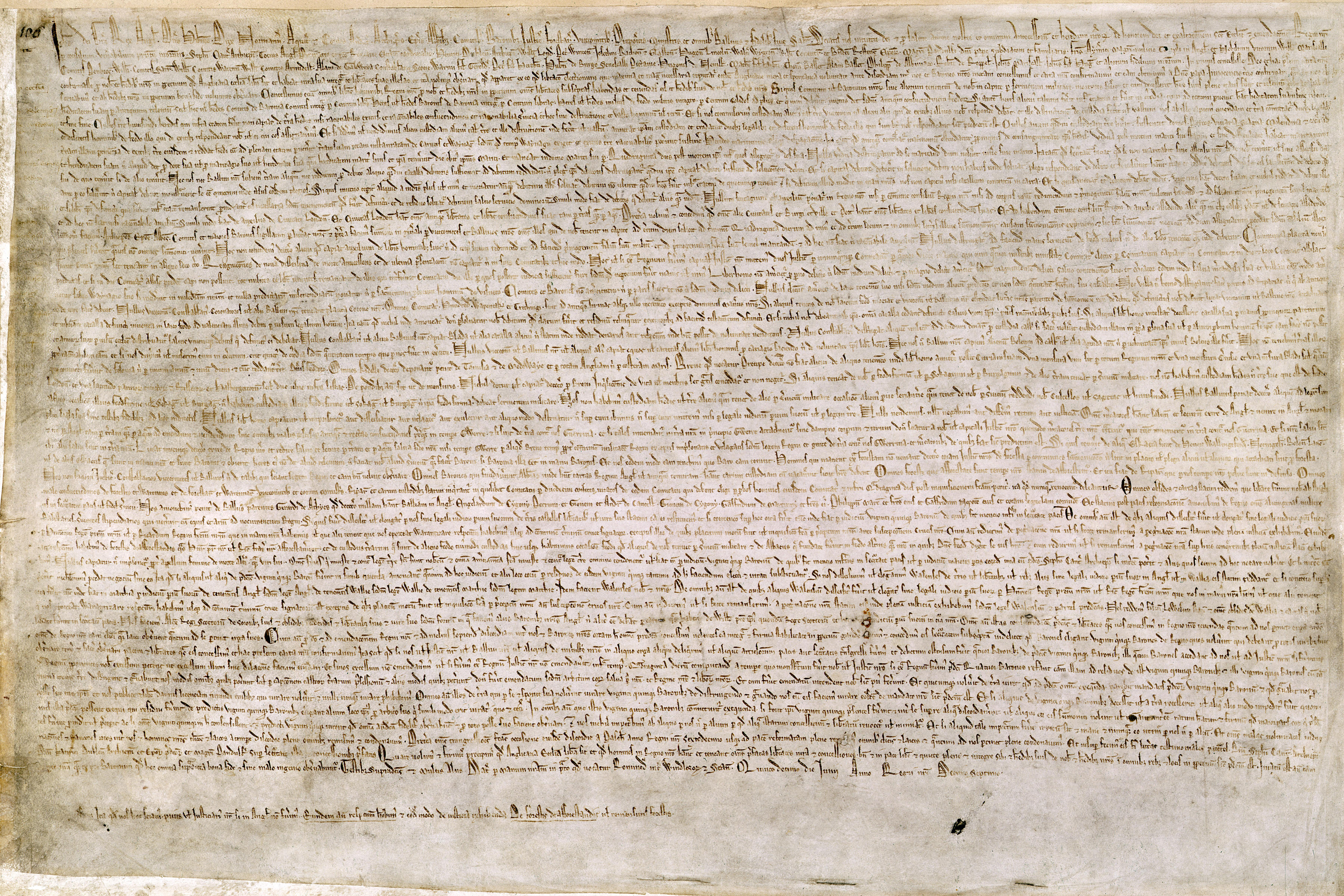
The sealing of Magna Carta is an important event in the history of Parliament, which was commemorated by a special exhibition in the Queen's Robing Room in February 2015.

Parliament in the Making was a programme of events organised by the Parliament of the United Kingdom to commemorate a series of anniversaries in 2015 including:

- the sealing of Magna Carta, on 15 June 1215, 800 years earlier
- the first representative parliament, Simon de Montfort's Parliament, on 20 January 1265, 750 years earlier
- the Battle of Agincourt on 25 October 1415, 600 years earlier
- the Battle of Waterloo on 18 June 1815, 200 years earlier
- the death of Winston Churchill on 24 January 1965, 50 years earlier
- the first Race Relations Act on 8 December 1965, 50 years earlier

== Programme of events ==
The Houses of Parliament organised several events during 2015 as part of the "Parliament in the Making" programme. These included exhibitions and talks about Winston Churchill that covered his involvement with the Parliament of the United Kingdom, which from 1801 to 1922 represented Great Britain and Ireland. A broader exhibition looked at the development of human rights and representation in the British Isles. The impact of Magna Carta on Parliament over the last 800 years was the subject of another exhibition. Furthermore, on Sunday 14 June 2015 at 3pm, Parliament encouraged everyone to "sit down to tea to celebrate, debate or reflect on their liberties" as part of an event called "LiberTeas".

=== Democracy Day ===
The BBC broadcast a "Democracy Day" on 20 January 2015 to coincide with the 750th anniversary of Montfort's Parliament. It was broadcast in partnership with the House of Commons and the House of Lords, including broadcasts from inside the Palace of Westminster. Montfort's parliament of 1265 was the first time that representatives of towns and shires were summoned together with nobles and bishops to discuss matters of national concern, something which ultimately paved the way for the emergence of the House of Commons.

During the day, live discussions were held about parliament, politics and democracy, which were participated in by people across the world. The first event was a discussion in the Speaker's House, led by Michael Sandel, professor of government at Harvard University, about democracy's "many facets, inherent tensions". Other discussions addressed open data and transparency in government; how the UK Parliament works; women in government; Islam and democracy; Africa and democracy; democracy and technology; and the influence of television dramas, in particular whether dramas such as The West Wing, Borgen or This House contribute to the public's understanding of the way politicians and government represent them or whether they adversely affect perceptions about this.

BBC Radio hosted a discussion with the United States Ambassador to the United Kingdom and the Ambassador of France to the United Kingdom. BBC News opened up its internal editorial meetings to live broadcasts.

Articles published during the day include a review of memorable speeches from 750 years of Parliament, and a timeline of the development of democracy in the United Kingdom from 1215 to today.

=== Concurrent events ===
Taking place concurrently with the Parliament in the Making programme, there were other events celebrating the same themes and anniversaries. In particular, the 800th anniversary of Magna Carta was celebrated throughout the United Kingdom as well as in the United States and other countries.

The BBC organised a season of programmes under the title "Taking Liberties". Consisting of television and radio broadcasts, as well as online content, these programmes addressed the history and influence of Magna Carta since its sealing eight centuries earlier. Programmes during the season also looked critically at contemporary democracy in the UK and worldwide.

The British Library hosted an extensive exhibition under the title "Magna Carta: Law, Liberty, Legacy". The British Library described the exhibition as exploring "the history and significance of this globally-recognised document" which has become "a potent symbol of liberty and the rule of law". The exhibitions featured other celebrated international documents including Thomas Jefferson's handwritten copy of the Declaration of Independence and an original copy of the United States Bill of Rights. Furthermore, the four surviving original copies of the 1215 Magna Carta held by the British Library and the cathedrals of Lincoln and Salisbury were located in the same place for the first time ever at an event at the British Library on 3 February and displayed together again in Parliament on 5 February 2015.

== Historical events in the development of Parliament ==
The Parliament in the Making programme was intended to "raise awareness of our democratic heritage with Parliament at the heart of the story". The following table summarises some of the main events in the development of the Parliament of the United Kingdom.

Act	Date	Description	Effect
	1066	William of Normandy, feudal system, council of advisers	Advisers are tenants-in-chief (a person who held land) and ecclesiastics
	1215	Magna Carta	Confers rights on the nobility and barons
	1265	Simon de Montfort's Parliament	First representative parliament
	1295	Edward I's Model Parliament adopts Montfort's scheme	Also summoned knights and burgesses; historically became known as the summoning of "the Commons"
	1341	Commons first have a separate meeting	First example of bicameral system; the emergence of Parliament as an institution
	1430, 1432	Introduction of formal property ownership qualification for voting rights, the forty shilling freeholders franchise	New uniform county franchise
	1535, 1542	Union of England and Wales	Wales was absorbed by the Kingdom of England
	1547	St Stephen's Chapel, in the Palace of Westminster became the meeting place of the House of Commons of England	
Petition of Right	1628	Assert certain rights of Parliament and the individual	Taxation requires parliamentary consent; writ of habeas corpus restated
	1649	Charles I executed	Commonwealth of England
	1660	Restoration of the monarchy	Culminated in the Glorious Revolution twenty-eight years later
Bill of Rights (England & Wales); Claim of Right (Scotland)	1689	Assert certain rights of Parliament and the individual	Contributed to parliamentary supremacy over the monarch; a landmark in the development of civil liberties in the United Kingdom
Acts of Union 1707	1707	Union of England and Scotland	Created the Parliament of Great Britain
Acts of Union 1800	1801	Union of Great Britain and Ireland	Created the Parliament of the United Kingdom
Great Reform Act, Second, and Third Reform Act	1832, 1867, 1884	Wider male franchise and more even representation	See history of elections in the United Kingdom
Ballot Act 1872	1872	Secret ballot	See, for example, voting system
Parliament Act 1911	1911	Payment of Members of Parliament introduced; reduced the maximum term of a parliament from seven years to five	With Parliament Act 1949, supremacy of the House of Commons
Representation of the People Act 1918	1918	Universal male franchise and franchise expanded to include some women (above age 30 and meeting certain conditions)	All male adults and c. 40% of adult women gained suffrage (dependent on marital status, property ownership)
Equal Franchise Act 1928	1928	Universal male and female suffrage from age 21	Electoral equality between women and men
Representation of the People Act 1969	1969	Voting age lowered to 18	Franchise expanded

During his May 2011 state visit to the United Kingdom, United States President Barack Obama gave a speech to both Houses of Parliament in Westminster Hall which made reference to the role of Parliament in developing democracy, rights and liberties.

Centuries ago, when kings, emperors, and warlords reigned over much of the world, it was the English who first spelled out the rights and liberties of man in the Magna Carta. It was here, in this very hall, where the rule of law first developed, courts were established, disputes were settled, and citizens came to petition their leaders. Over time, the people of this nation ... would ultimately forge an English Bill of Rights, and invest the power to govern in an elected parliament that's gathered here today. What began on this island would inspire millions throughout the continent of Europe and across the world ... As Winston Churchill said, the "…Magna Carta, the Bill of Rights, Habeas Corpus, trial by jury, and English common law find their most famous expression in the American Declaration of Independence." ... [W]e have learned better than most that the longing for freedom and human dignity is not English or American or Western – it is universal, and it beats in every heart.

== See also ==
- Constitution of the United Kingdom
- History of the constitution of the United Kingdom
- UK Parliament Week
- The History of Parliament
- Westminster system
