= Buz Stop Boys =

Ghanaian non-governmental organization

- Formation: Early 2023
- Founder: Heneba Safo
- Type: Volunteer organization
- Purpose: Environmental sanitation and community service
- Headquarters: Accra, Ghana
- Location: Ghana
- Region served: Urban communities in Ghana
- Coordinator: Heneba Safo

Buz Stop Boys is a Ghanaian non-governmental volunteer organization focused on environmental sanitation and community clean-up initiatives. Based in Accra, the group works to improve public hygiene by cleaning streets, bus stops, and other public spaces while promoting environmental awareness and civic responsibility. Heneba Kwadwo Safo is the founder and leader of the organization.

== History ==
The group was founded in 2023 by civil engineer Heneba Kwadwo Sarfo as a grassroots initiative aimed at addressing sanitation challenges in urban Ghana. It began with a small number of volunteers and gradually expanded into a broader movement involving individuals from various professional backgrounds. The initiative gained wider attention through social media and media coverage, highlighting its efforts to improve sanitation in densely populated areas.

== Activities ==
Buz Stop Boys carry out regular sanitation activities, including:

- Cleaning streets, gutters, and public spaces
- Organising community clean-up campaigns
- Promoting waste management and environmental hygiene
- Engaging volunteers in civic initiatives

The group typically conducts clean-up exercises multiple times a week in parts of Greater Accra and other regions.

== Presidential recognition ==
The organisation has collaborated with various partners and community groups to support its activities.

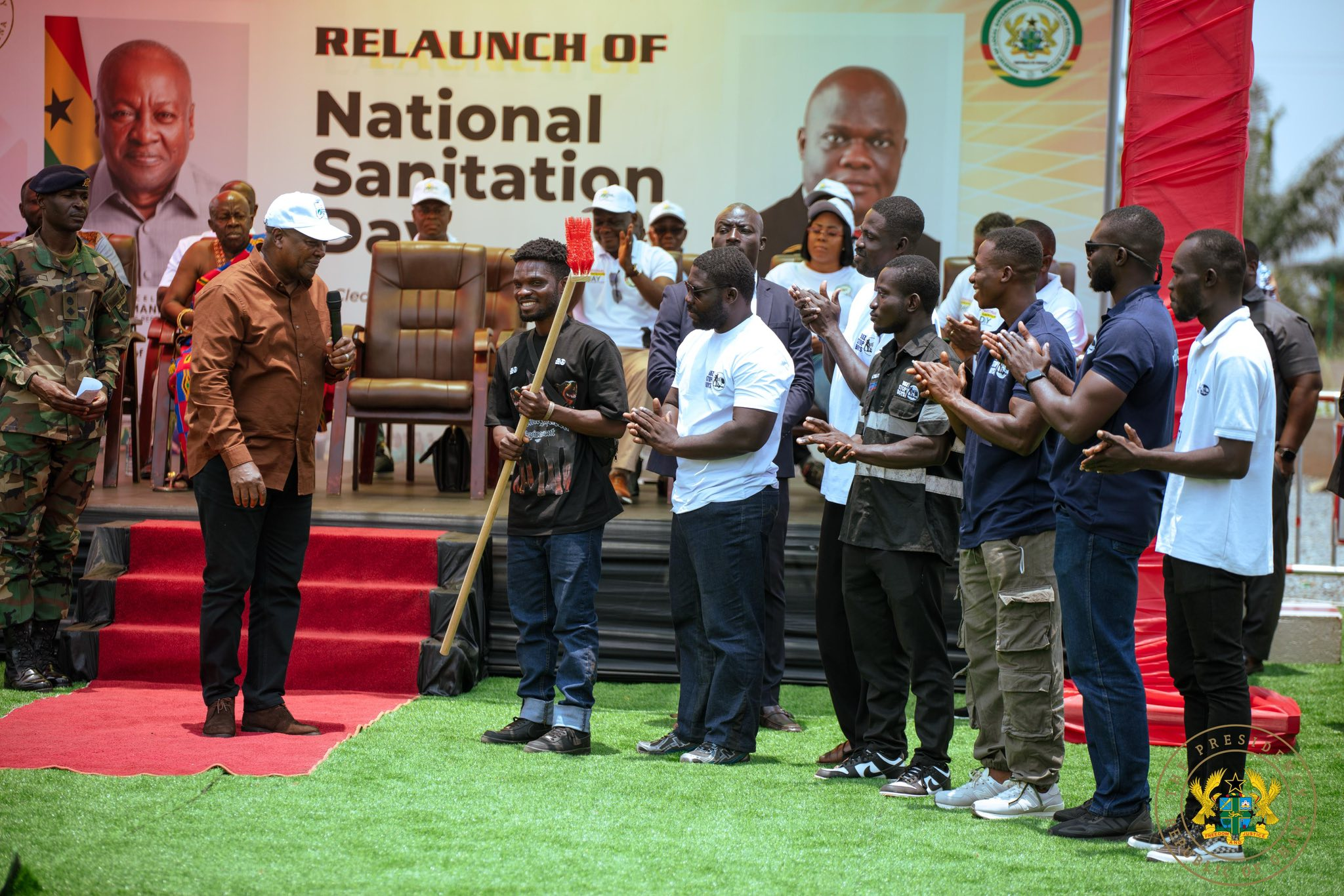
President John Dramani Mahama publicly commended and provided support for the 'BuzstopBoys' for their exceptional dedication to environmental cleanliness,

In 2025, the group received sanitation equipment and public commendation from Ghanaian president John Dramani Mahama for its contribution to keeping the city clean. It has also partnered with private organisations on sanitation campaigns aimed at improving environmental conditions in Ghana.

== Impact and collaborations ==
Buz Stop Boys has contributed to raising awareness of sanitation challenges in Ghana and encouraging community participation in environmental cleanliness. Their activities have been noted for promoting behavioural change and civic engagement among residents. The team continues to improve environmental sanitation in urban communities across Ghana through regular clean-up exercises and volunteer-driven initiatives. The group conducts clean-up activities multiple times each week, focusing on areas affected by waste accumulation and poor drainage.

The organisation has collaborated with several corporate and community partners to expand its activities. In 2024, it worked with Zoomlion Ghana Limited on sanitation efforts aimed at improving cleanliness in parts of Accra. It has also partnered with tourism and environmental stakeholders, including the Ghana Tourism Authority, to undertake clean-up exercises at public recreational spaces. In addition, the group has received financial and logistical support from private individuals and organisations. In 2025, businessman Dr Kofi Amoah (Citizen Kofi) donated funds to support the group's sanitation activities. The initiative has also attracted international collaboration, including participation in beach clean-up campaigns with external organisations such as Black By God. The group's work has received recognition both locally and internationally. It has been acknowledged in media reports as a grassroots movement addressing sanitation challenges in Ghana, and was reported to be scheduled for international recognition at the 2025 Carnival of Cultures in Berlin.

== Awards and recognition ==
Buz Stop Boys has received several awards and recognitions for its contributions to environmental sanitation and community volunteerism in Ghana.

Buz stop boys who clean up spaces and promote environmental care have been honored at the Berlin Carnival of Cultures.

== See also ==
- Environmental issues in Ghana
- Waste management
