= Democracy Day (Nigeria) =

Anniversary of establishment of the Fourth Nigerian Republic

Democracy Day is a national public holiday in Nigeria to commemorate the restoration of democracy in 1999, commemorated on 12 June. Until 2018, it was celebrated annually on May 29. It is a tradition that has been held annually, beginning in year 2000. June 12 was formerly known as Abiola Day, celebrated in Lagos and some South-western states of Nigeria.

== History ==
=== Background ===
Nigeria gained independence from Great Britain on 1 October 1960. For most of its independent history, Nigeria was ruled by a series of military juntas, interspersed by brief moments of democratic rule (for example from 1979 to 1983 with Alhaji Shehu Shagari). The last major military ruler was Gen. Sani Abacha, who died suddenly on Monday in 1998. His successor, Gen. Abdulsalami Abubakar promised a transition to democracy, and accordingly a new constitution was adopted on May 5, 1999. Elections were held and retired Gen. Olusegun Obasanjo, who had previously governed Nigeria as a military ruler, was elected the new president.

=== Democracy Day ===
May 29 was initially the official democracy day in Nigeria, marking when the newly elected Olusegun Obasanjo took office as President of Nigeria. On June 6, 2018, eight days after May 29, 2018, had been celebrated as Democracy Day, the government of president Muhammadu Buhari declared June 12 to be the new Democracy Day. This was done to commemorate the democratic election of Moshood Abiola on June 12, 1993, which was wrongly cancelled by the government of Ibrahim Babangida. Abiola was later detained after he rightfully declared himself the president.

== Others ==
The Nigerian Democracy Day theme song was written by Attih Soul on the directives of the Buhari led administration in 2017 as part of the celebration to mark the day.

== See also ==
- Democracy Day in other countries.
