= List of people who have addressed both houses of the Parliament of the United Kingdom =

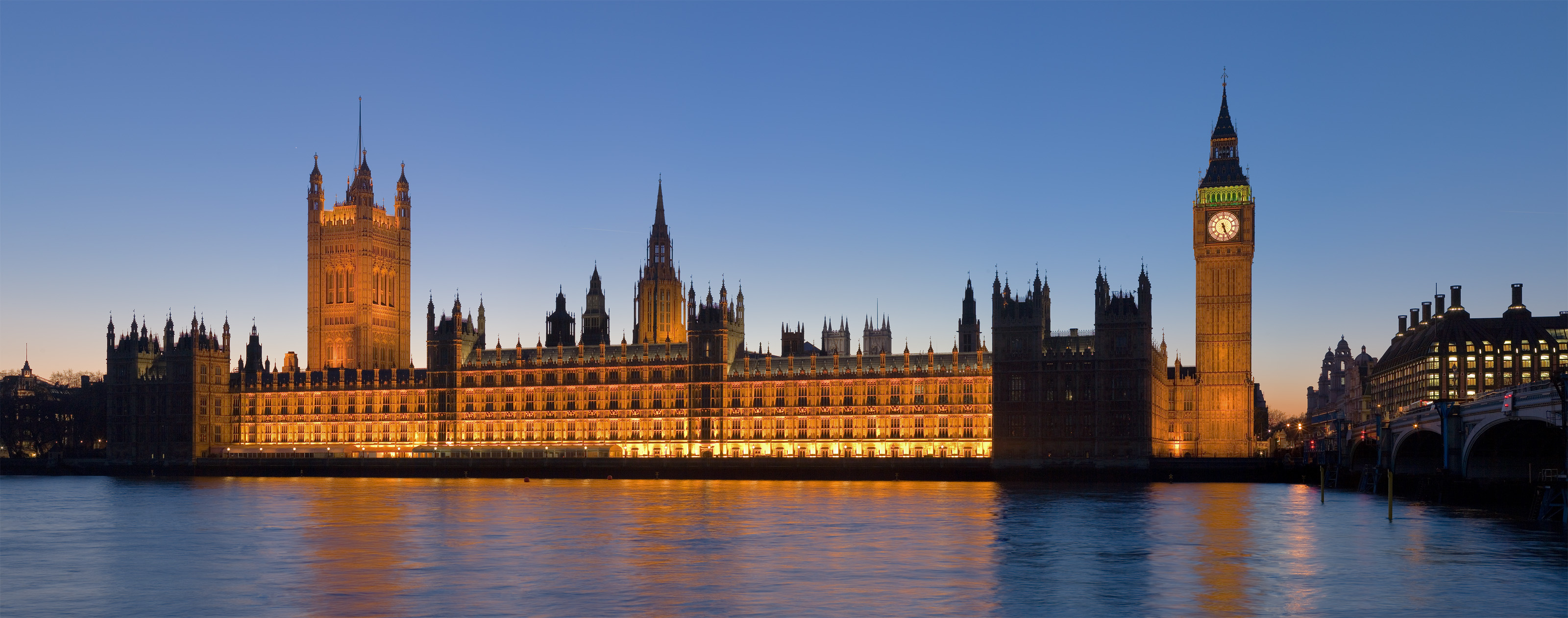
The Palace of Westminster, meeting place of the House of Commons and the House of Lords

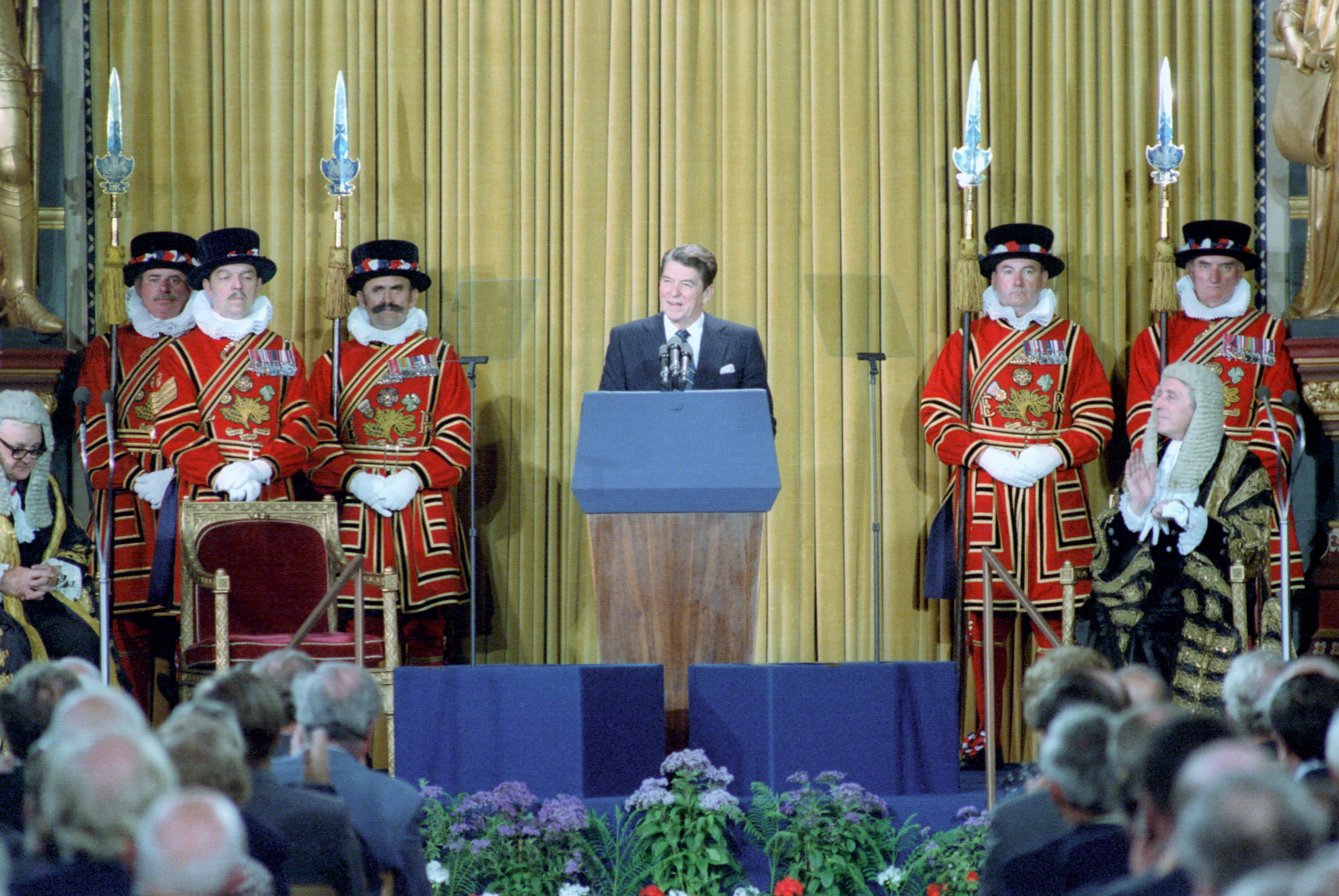
President of the United States Ronald Reagan addressing Parliament, 8 June 1982

This is a list of people who have addressed both houses of the United Kingdom Parliament at the same time. Although English and, later, British monarchs have jointly addressed the House of Commons and the House of Lords on several occasions since the 16th century, the first foreign dignitary to do so was French President Albert Lebrun in March 1939. The list excludes the speeches given by (or on behalf of) the sovereign at the State Opening of Parliament and at the close of each parliamentary session.

Only four people besides the reigning monarch at the time have addressed both houses together on more than one occasion. Nelson Mandela addressed members of the Commons and the Lords in 1993 and in 1996 as President of South Africa. Mikhail Gorbachev addressed the houses as a secretary of the Communist Party of the Soviet Union and a foreign delegate of the Soviet Union in 1984, and then in 1993 on behalf of the Inter-Parliamentary Union. Shimon Peres addressed the houses as Prime Minister of Israel in 1986 and as President in 2008. Volodymyr Zelenskyy addressed the houses as President of Ukraine, the first to address in the Chamber (albeit via remote video link from Ukraine), in 2022 during the Russian invasion of Ukraine.

Unlike most addresses by foreign dignitaries before a parliament, which are typically held in the parliament's plenary chamber (in the case of a bicameral parliament, it would be the plenary chamber used for joint sittings), addresses before the UK Parliament are always held elsewhere in the Palace of Westminster, as the invited foreign dignitary is not a member of the UK Parliament, and is therefore not permitted to speak.

== People who have addressed both houses of the Parliament of the United Kingdom ==
Date	Visitor	Position	Location	Ref
9 May 1935	George V	King of the United Kingdom	Westminster Hall	
23 March 1939	Albert Lebrun	President of France	Westminster Hall	
21 October 1942	Jan Christiaan Smuts	Prime Minister of South Africa	Royal Gallery	(Note: Members of both houses were present at the meeting but this was not a formal presentation to both houses.)
11 May 1944	William Lyon Mackenzie King	Prime Minister of Canada	Royal Gallery	
17 May 1945	George VI	King of the United Kingdom	Royal Gallery	(Note: The speech was to announce the Victory in Europe.)
21 August 1945	George VI	King of the United Kingdom	Royal Gallery	(Note: The speech was to announce the victory in the Second World War.)
9 March 1950	Vincent Auriol	President of France	Royal Gallery	
26 October 1950	George VI	King of the United Kingdom	Westminster Hall	(Note: The speech was to announce the opening of the new Chamber of the House of Commons.)
22 October 1954	Haile Selassie I	Emperor of Ethiopia	Royal Gallery	
24 April 1956	Nikolai Bulganin	Premier of the Soviet Union	Royal Gallery	
24 April 1956	Nikita Khrushchev	First Secretary of the Communist Party of the Soviet Union	Royal Gallery	
7 April 1960	Charles de Gaulle	President of France	Westminster Hall	
22 June 1965	Elizabeth II	Queen of the United Kingdom	Royal Gallery	(Note: The speech was to commemorate the 700th anniversary of Simon de Montfort's Parliament.)
28 April 1966	U Thant	Secretary-General of the United Nations	Royal Gallery	
9 February 1967	Alexei Kosygin	Premier of the Soviet Union	Royal Gallery	
28 April 1969	Giuseppe Saragat	President of Italy	Royal Gallery	
3 March 1970	Willy Brandt	Chancellor of West Germany	Royal Gallery	
23 June 1976	Valéry Giscard d'Estaing	President of France	Royal Gallery	
4 May 1977	Elizabeth II	Queen of the United Kingdom	Westminster Hall	(Note: The speech was the Queen's Silver Jubilee address to Parliament.)
8 June 1982	Ronald Reagan	President of the United States	Royal Gallery	
24 October 1984	François Mitterrand	President of France	Royal Gallery	
18 December 1984	Mikhail Gorbachev	Secretary of the Communist Party of the Soviet Union; Foreign delegate of the Soviet Union	Grand Committee Room	
23 January 1986	Shimon Peres	Prime Minister of Israel	Grand Committee Room	
28 April 1986	Juan Carlos I	King of Spain	Royal Gallery	
2 July 1986	Richard von Weizsäcker	President of West Germany	Royal Gallery	
20 July 1988	Elizabeth II	Queen of the United Kingdom	Westminster Hall	(Note: The speech was to commemorate the tercentenary of the Revolution of 1688–89 and the Bill of Rights.)
8 May 1989	Daniel Ortega	President of Nicaragua	Committee Room 14	
24 October 1990	Francesco Cossiga	President of Italy	Royal Gallery	
10 November 1992	Boris Yeltsin	President of Russia	Royal Gallery	
28 April 1993	Mário Soares	President of Portugal	Grand Committee Room	
5 May 1993	Nelson Mandela	President of the African National Congress	Grand Committee Room	
7 December 1993	Mikhail Gorbachev	Former General Secretary of the Communist Party of the Soviet Union	Grand Committee Room	
6 May 1995	Elizabeth II	Queen of the United Kingdom	Westminster Hall	(Note: The speech was to commemorate the 50th anniversary of Victory in Europe.)
29 November 1995	Bill Clinton	President of the United States	Royal Gallery	
15 May 1996	Jacques Chirac	President of France	Royal Gallery	
11 July 1996	Nelson Mandela	President of South Africa	Westminster Hall	
16 July 1996	Tenzin Gyatso	Dalai Lama	Grand Committee Room	
29 October 1998	Carlos Menem	President of Argentina	Grand Committee Room	
6 July 2000	John Howard	Prime Minister of Australia	Royal Gallery	
8 November 2001	Abdullah II ibn al-Hussein	King of Jordan	Committee Room	
30 April 2002	Elizabeth II	Queen of the United Kingdom	Westminster Hall	(Note: The speech was the Queen's Golden Jubilee address to Parliament.)
16 March 2005	Carlo Azeglio Ciampi	President of Italy	Queen's Robing Room	
26 October 2005	Harald V	King of Norway	Queen's Robing Room	
9 November 2005	Hu Jintao	General Secretary of the Chinese Communist Party; President of China	Queen's Robing Room	
8 March 2006	Lula da Silva	President of Brazil	Queen's Robing Room	
14 March 2007	John Kufuor	President of Ghana	Queen's Robing Room	
8 May 2007	Kofi Annan	Former Secretary-General of the United Nations	Royal Gallery	
15 May 2007	Bertie Ahern	Taoiseach of Ireland	Royal Gallery	
26 March 2008	Nicolas Sarkozy	President of France	Royal Gallery	
19 November 2008	Shimon Peres	President of Israel	Queen's Robing Room	
1 April 2009	Felipe Calderón	President of Mexico	Queen's Robing Room	
29 October 2009	Pratibha Patil	President of India	Queen's Robing Room	
4 March 2010	Jacob Zuma	President of South Africa	Queen's Robing Room	
17 September 2010	Benedict XVI	Pope (state visit)	Westminster Hall	
26 October 2010	Hamad bin Khalifa Al Thani	Emir of Qatar	Queen's Robing Room	
25 May 2011	Barack Obama	President of the United States	Westminster Hall	
20 March 2012	Elizabeth II	Queen of the United Kingdom	Westminster Hall	(Note: The speech was the Queen's Diamond Jubilee address to Parliament.)
21 June 2012	Aung San Suu Kyi	Burmese Opposition Leader	Westminster Hall	
1 November 2012	Susilo Bambang Yudhoyono	President of Indonesia	Queen's Robing Room	
29 November 2012	Sabah Al-Ahmad Al-Jaber Al-Sabah	Emir of Kuwait	Queen's Robing Room	
20 March 2013	Joyce Banda	President of Malawi	River Room	
13 June 2013	Stephen Harper	Prime Minister of Canada	Queen's Robing Room	
5 November 2013	Park Geun-hye	President of South Korea	Queen's Robing Room	
27 February 2014	Angela Merkel	Chancellor of Germany	Royal Gallery	
8 April 2014	Michael D. Higgins	President of Ireland	Royal Gallery	
21 October 2014	Tony Tan Keng Yam	President of Singapore	Queen's Robing Room	
3 March 2015	Enrique Peña Nieto	President of Mexico	Queen's Robing Room	
20 October 2015	Xi Jinping	General Secretary of the Chinese Communist Party; President of China	Royal Gallery	
12 November 2015	Narendra Modi	Prime Minister of India	Royal Gallery	
19 April 2016	Joko Widodo	President of Indonesia	Queen's Robing Room	
1 November 2016	Juan Manuel Santos Calderón	President of Colombia	Queen's Robing Room	
12 July 2017	Felipe VI	King of Spain	Royal Gallery	
23 October 2018	Willem-Alexander	King of the Netherlands	Royal Gallery	
8 March 2022	Volodymyr Zelenskyy	President of Ukraine	Commons Chamber (by videolink)	
12 September 2022	Charles III	King of the United Kingdom	Westminster Hall	
22 November 2022	Cyril Ramaphosa	President of South Africa	Royal Gallery	
29 November 2022	Olena Zelenska	First Lady of Ukraine	Committee Room 14	
8 February 2023	Volodymyr Zelenskyy	President of Ukraine	Westminster Hall	
21 November 2023	Yoon Suk Yeol	President of South Korea	Royal Gallery	
3 December 2024	Tamim bin Hamad Al Thani	Emir of Qatar	King's Robing Room	
8 July 2025	Emmanuel Macron	President of France	Royal Gallery	
4 December 2025	Frank-Walter Steinmeier	President of Germany	Royal Gallery	
20 January 2026	Mike Johnson	Speaker of the United States House of Representatives	Committee Room 14	
17 March 2026	Volodymyr Zelenskyy	President of Ukraine	Committee Room 14	

== See also ==
- Joint address (Canada)
- Joint meetings of the Parliament of Australia
- Joint session of the Parliament of India
- Joint session of the Congress of the Philippines
- Joint session of the United States Congress
- Congress of the French Parliament
- List of joint sessions of the United States Congress
- List of addresses to the Oireachtas
