= Community PlanIt =

Community Planit is a community planning platform that uses gamification to diversify and engage citizens that participate in community decision-making. Designed by Engagement Lab at Emerson College in September 2012, Community Planit is centered around time-sensitive games that help players use their voice in community decisions, as well as community leaders and local officeholders cheaply and easily gain feedback from difficult to reach stakeholders.

Incentives come in the form of coins which have several purposes:

"Coins function to rank players’ performance in the game, and also serve as a currency that can be spent on "causes" which are local projects that benefit the communities playing, such as college application assistance for low-income youth or funding a neighborhood bike program. Players with more coins accumulated have a greater impact on which causes win."

Each game culminates in real life community planning meeting that acts as a "Game Finale."

== Operations ==
Games created on Community Planit's platform have ranged from the neighborhood level to the international level.

In April 2013, their game tackling Moldovan unemployment Youth@Work gained the attention of the UK news site, The Guardian.

In March, 2016, Community Planit featured a game about tackling Boston's carbon emissions and sustainability issues.

== Funding ==
Community Planit is supported by the Engagement Lab at Emerson College, as well as financial contributions from the Knight Foundation.

Other sponsors include the World Wildlife Fund.

== See also ==
- Engagement Lab at Emerson College
