= UK Parliament Week =

Annual series of events in the United Kingdom

UK Parliament Week logo

UK Parliament Week, previously called Parliament Week, is an annual series of events in the United Kingdom that aim to inspire interest in parliament, politics and democracy and encourage young people and the public to engage with the UK's democratic system and institutions. Initiated in 2011, a week-long programme of events and activities is organised each year by the House of Commons and House of Lords of the Parliament of the United Kingdom in collaboration with hundreds of other organisations around the country including charities, schools, museums and community groups.

== History ==
The inaugural Parliament Week took place in 2011 between 31 October and 6 November with events taking place around the country. Running from 19 to 23 November, the schedule for 2012 included visits to schools and debates with school children. The third Parliament Week ran from 15 to 21 November 2013 and included events about women in democracy. Since 2013, the European Parliament has held an entirely separate event for members of national parliaments under the name "European Parliamentary Week".

Parliament Week 2014 took place from 14 to 20 November. Discussion topics included digital democracy and a social media campaign called "Do Democracy" which aimed to encourage 16- to 24-year-olds to make their views heard in Parliament and other democratic institutions across the UK.

In 2015, Parliament Week was held on 16–22 November and focused on "the future of democracy". It was coordinated with a year-long programme of events called "Parliament in the Making" which celebrated the 750th anniversary of the first English Parliament to include representatives of the towns and cities of England on 20 January 1265, and the 800th anniversary of the sealing of Magna Carta on 15 June 1215.

The official name of the event was changed in 2016 to "UK Parliament Week" from "Parliament Week". This change was intended to signify the emphasis on delivering events throughout the United Kingdom and to help distinguish it from activities relating to other Parliaments and Assemblies in the UK: the Scottish Parliament, Senedd Cymru and Northern Ireland Assembly. Parliament Week was held on 14–20 November 2016 which saw 280 events take place around the country including a visit to a school by cabinet minister, Chris Skidmore (Minister for the Constitution).

Parliament Week 2017 was held on 13–19 November during which 4,596 events took place across the UK involving 360,000 people. In 2018, Parliament Week was held on 12–18 November. It focused on events celebrating 100 years of women's suffrage in parliamentary elections in the United Kingdom and all men getting the vote. This was coordinated with Parliament's "Vote100" events. It involved almost 1 million people and more than 8,100 activities.

In 2019, Council of British International Schools around the world were encouraged to participate in UK Parliament Week, taking place form 2–8 November. The Church of England and Nottingham Trent University also participated. Over 1.2 million people took part across England, Northern Ireland, Scotland and Wales and in 47 other countries around the world. The 2020 UK Parliament Week, its tenth year, supported Make Your Mark, a British Youth Council campaign providing an opportunity for 11-18 year-olds across the UK to vote on policies they would like to introduce or change.

There were 10,000 activities organised in 2021 in every region and nation of the UK, and in many other countries around the world, in which 1.1 million people took part. The Open University's OpenLearn platform marked UK Parliament Week 2022 with a new 'social change' course. A Hindu community group, which has been involved in UK Parliament Week since 2018, organised a debate about climate change. In November 2023, more than 11,000 events were planned across the country, as well as in the Crown Dependencies and the British Overseas Territories. UK Parliament Week in 2024 took place from 18-24 November. During the week, the Speaker of the House of Commons met young students holding a ‘Pupil Parliament’; and a number of MPs and MSPs met elderly residents in care homes in their constituencies.

== See also ==
- Civic engagement
- Democracy Day (Canada)
- European Local Democracy Week
- International Day of Democracy
- List of political parties in the United Kingdom
