= International Day of Democracy =

International observance, 15 September

- A voting box
- Also called: International Democracy Day
- Observed by: All UN member states
- Celebrations: promoting and upholding the principles of democracy
- Date: 15 September
- Next time: 15 September 2027
- Frequency: annual
- First time: September 2008; 18 years ago

In 2007 the United Nations General Assembly resolved to observe 15 September as the International Day of Democracy—with the purpose of promoting and upholding the principles of democracy—and invited all member states and organizations to commemorate the day in an appropriate manner that contributes to raising public awareness.

…while democracies share common features, there is no single model of democracy and that democracy does not belong to any country or region... …democracy is a universal value based on the freely-expressed will of people to determine their own political, economic, social and cultural systems, and their full participation in all aspects of life.

== Background ==
In September 1997 the Inter-Parliamentary Union (IPU) adopted a Universal Declaration on Democracy. That Declaration affirms the principles of democracy, the elements and exercise of democratic government, and the international scope of democracy. The international conferences on new and restored democracies (ICNRD process) began in 1988 under the initiative of President Corazon C. Aquino of the Philippines after the peaceful People Power Revolution overthrew the 20-year dictatorship of Ferdinand Marcos. Initially an inter-governmental forum, the ICNRD process developed into a tripartite structure with participation of governments, parliaments and civil society. The sixth conference (ICNRD-6) that took place in Doha, Qatar, in 2006 reinforced the tripartite nature of the process and concluded with a declaration and Plan of Action which reaffirmed the fundamental principles and values of democracy.

Following up on the outcome of ICNRD-6, an advisory board set up by the chair of the process, Qatar, decided to promote an International Day of Democracy. Qatar took the lead in drafting the text of a United Nations General Assembly resolution and convened consultations with UN member states. At the suggestion of the IPU, on 15 September (date of the Universal Declaration on Democracy) was chosen as the day when the international community would celebrate each year the International Day of Democracy. The resolution, titled "Support by the United Nations system of efforts of Governments to promote and consolidate new or restored democracies," was adopted by consensus on 8 November 2007.

== History ==
=== 2000s ===
The First International Day of Democracy took place in 2008.

The theme for International Day of Democracy 2009 was "Democracy and political tolerance". At the U.N. Headquarters there was a speech by the Secretary-General and a screening of the documentary film Please Vote for Me.

=== 2010s ===
For International Day of Democracy 2010, a panel discussion on "Democracy and the Millennium Development Goals" was co-organized by the International Conference of New and Restored Democracy and the Permanent Mission of the Bolivarian Republic of Venezuela.

The theme for International Day of Democracy 2011 was "Peace and Democracy: Make Your Voice heard".

The theme for International Day of Democracy 2012 was "Democracy Education".

In 2013, the IPU promoted the International Day of Democracy through its Member Parliaments in 162 countries around the world. As a result, a number of parliaments from all over the globe announced their events to be held on or close to 15 September. The year's theme was "Strengthening Voices for Democracy" and IPU launched an online contest to hear and gather stories from local democracy champions that managed to make their voices heard. These stories were to inspire people to take action in their own community.

The theme for International Day of Democracy 2014 was "Engaging Young People on Democracy". IPU has urged action and changes in mindset if disillusioned and alienated youth the world over are to be engaged in political decision-making. In its press release, IPU President Abdelwahad Radi said, "It is a cliché to always link youth to the future. Young people not only have the power to define the future, but also decide on the present. However, they are largely absent from formal decision-making politics and this has to change". The IPU says youth participation has a special meaning for it and that a programme to promote young men and women’s involvement in the democratic process is getting underway, in follow-up to the resolution adopted by the IPU Assembly in 2010. The IPU announced it would organize the first Global Conference of Young Parliamentarians on 10 and 11 October 2014 and all parliaments were invited to attend. A photo contest titled "Engage for Change" encourages youth to show what action they take to bring about positive change in society by sending a photo that shows them working for positive change in their community, region, country or the world.

The theme for International Day of Democracy 2015 was "Space for Civil Society".

The theme for International Day of Democracy 2016 was "Democracy and the 2030 Agenda for Sustainable Development".

The theme for International Day of Democracy 2017 was "Democracy and Conflict Prevention".

The theme for International Day of Democracy 2018 was "Democracy under Strain: Solutions for a Changing World". Coinciding with the 70th anniversary of the Universal Declaration of Human Rights, the Day is also an opportunity to highlight the values of freedom and respect for human rights as essential elements of democracy.

The theme for International Day of Democracy 2019 was "Inclusion and Participation as Foundations of Democracy". "This year's International Day of Democracy is an opportunity to recall that democracy is about people. Democracy is built on inclusion, equal treatment and participation—and it is a fundamental building block for peace, sustainable development, and human rights."

=== 2020s ===
The theme for International Day of Democracy 2020 was "COVID-19: A Spotlight on Democracy".

The theme for International Day of Democracy 2021 was "Strengthening democratic resilience in the face of future crises".

The theme for International Day of Democracy 2022 was "Protecting Press Freedom for Democracy".

The theme for International Day of Democracy 2023 was "Empowering the next generation".

The theme for International Day of Democracy 2024 was "Navigating AI for Governance and Citizen Engagement".

The theme for International Day of Democracy 2025 was "From Voice to Action".

The theme for International Day of Democracy 2026 was "Raising Hands and Voices – Fostering Agency and Ownership through Deliberative Democracy".

== See also ==
- Civic engagement
- Democracy Day in other countries
- Electoral system
- European Local Democracy Week
- UK Parliament Week
