= Attih Soul =

Nigerian musician

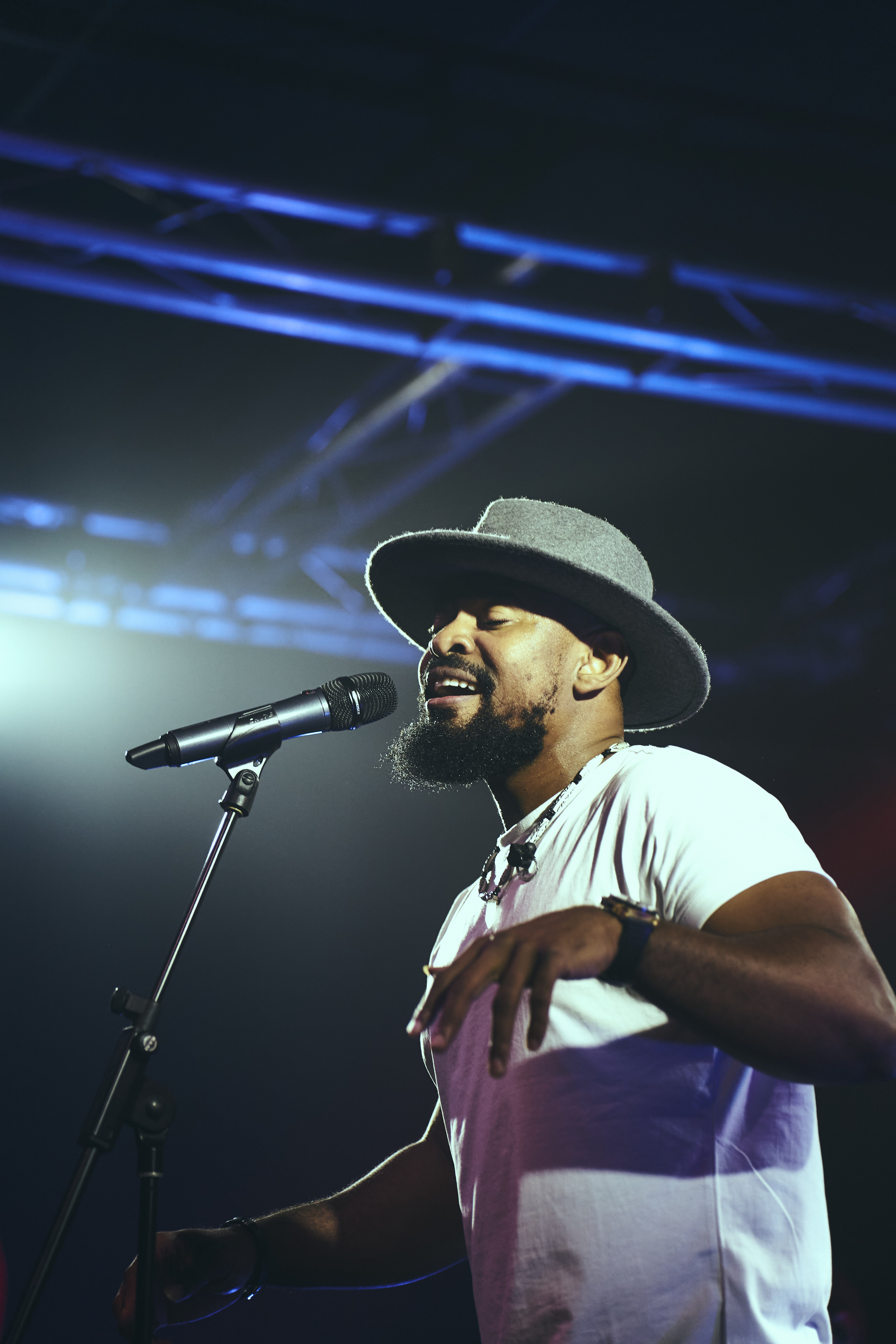

Background information
- Born: Attih Ekpenyong; February 13, 1990 (age 36); Calabar, Nigeria
- Genres: Soul, R&B
- Occupations: Singer, musician, songwriter
- Instruments: Vocals, guitar, keyboard
- Years active: 2011–present

Attih Ekpenyong, known professionally as Attih Soul, is a Nigerian soul and R&B singer and musician currently based in Barcelona, Spain. He is also known for and performing at events such as the Road to Yalta International Music Festival, the World Music Festival at the French Institute,and Solsona Festival, among others.

== Early life and education ==
Ekpenyong was born in 1990 in Calabar, Cross River State, Nigeria. He graduated from the University of Calabar with a bachelor's degree in medical biochemistry. Ekpenyong also earned a dual master's degree in international talent management and leadership from Barcelona Executive Business School and Catholic University of Murcia.

== Career ==
=== Early career ===
Ekpenyong began singing as a child, but officially began his music career in 2011 by singing at open mic events. He competed on reality singing competitions like Nigerian Idol, Voice Cross River, and Project Fame West Africa.

In 2017, Ekpenyong was chosen by the administration of President Muhammadu Buhari to write and perform the theme song for Nigeria's Democracy Day. In the same year, Soul performed his first international concert in South Africa and released his first single, "Say You Love Me".

Ekpenyong later expanded his career internationally, performing in several countries across Africa and Europe. He received recognition from the French Institute for his contributions to music, after he won the World Music Festival Competition with his music group, The A Team, in 2018.

In 2020, Ekpenyong represented Nigeria at the Road to Yalta International Music Festival in Yalta, Russia, performing alongside Yaroslav Sumishevskiy and the Otta Orchestra. After performing, he was awarded a cash prize, an award of excellence, and a Golden Microphone by Russian singer Lev Leschenko, who served as the event's chairman of the jury.

=== Recent work ===
In February 2022, Ekpenyong released a titled "Friendzone". In the same year, he released a second single, titled "Someday I'll Find You".

In June 2023, Ekpenyong signed a management deal with the French management company Talent and Skills, and also released the acoustic EP The Acoustic Experiment.

In November 2023, Ekpenyong performed a headline concert in Sala NaLau, Barcelona to promote his album Shades of Emotion, which was released in the same month. He also held a concert in Barcelona along with Sadie and Werio.

In 2025, Ekpenyong released three choir versions of songs from the Shades of Emotions album: “Good Old Days,” “Dreams,” and “Healed Too Much.”

On the 13th of July 2025, Ekpenyong performed at Barcelona footballer Lamine Yamal’s birthday party.

== Musical style and influences ==
Attih Soul’s music is primarily rooted in Soul and R&B. He has cited artists such as Boyz II Men as influences on his music.

== Discography ==
=== Singles ===
Title	Year	Album
"Say You Love Me"	2017	Non-album single
"Friendzone"	2022	Shades of Emotions
"Someday I'll Find You"	2022	Shades of Emotions
“Healed Too Much”	2025	Shades of Emotions
“Good Old Days (Choir Version)”	2025	Non-album single
“Dreams (Choir Version)”	2025	Non-album single
“Healed Too Much (Choir Version)”	2025	Non-album single

=== Albums ===
Title	Released
Shades of Emotions	2023

=== EPs ===
Title	Released
The Acoustic Experiment	2023

== Awards and recognition ==
- Democracy Day (Nigeria) theme song - 2017
- Best Music Group (With The A Team) - World Music Day Festival - 2020
- Golden Microphone - Road to Yalta Music Festival - 2023

== Personal life ==
Ekpenyong is based in Barcelona, Spain, where he continues to develop his music career.
