= Chaloner Chute =

English lawyer and politician (died 1659)

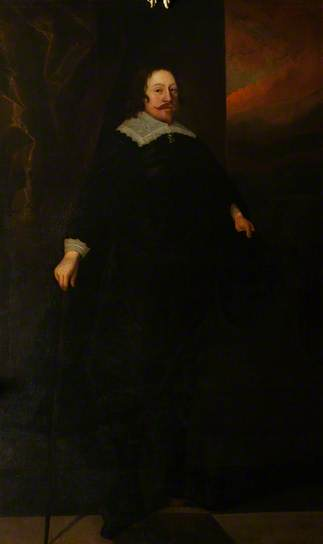
Chaloner Chute, portrait by unknown artist, collection of National Trust, The Vyne

Chaloner Chute (died 14 April 1659) of The Vyne, Sherborne St John, Hampshire, was an English lawyer, Member of Parliament and Speaker of the House of Commons during the Commonwealth.

== Origins ==
Chute was the son of Charles Chute of the Middle Temple, a lawyer, by his wife Ursula Chaloner, a daughter of John Chaloner of Fulham in Middlesex.

== Career ==
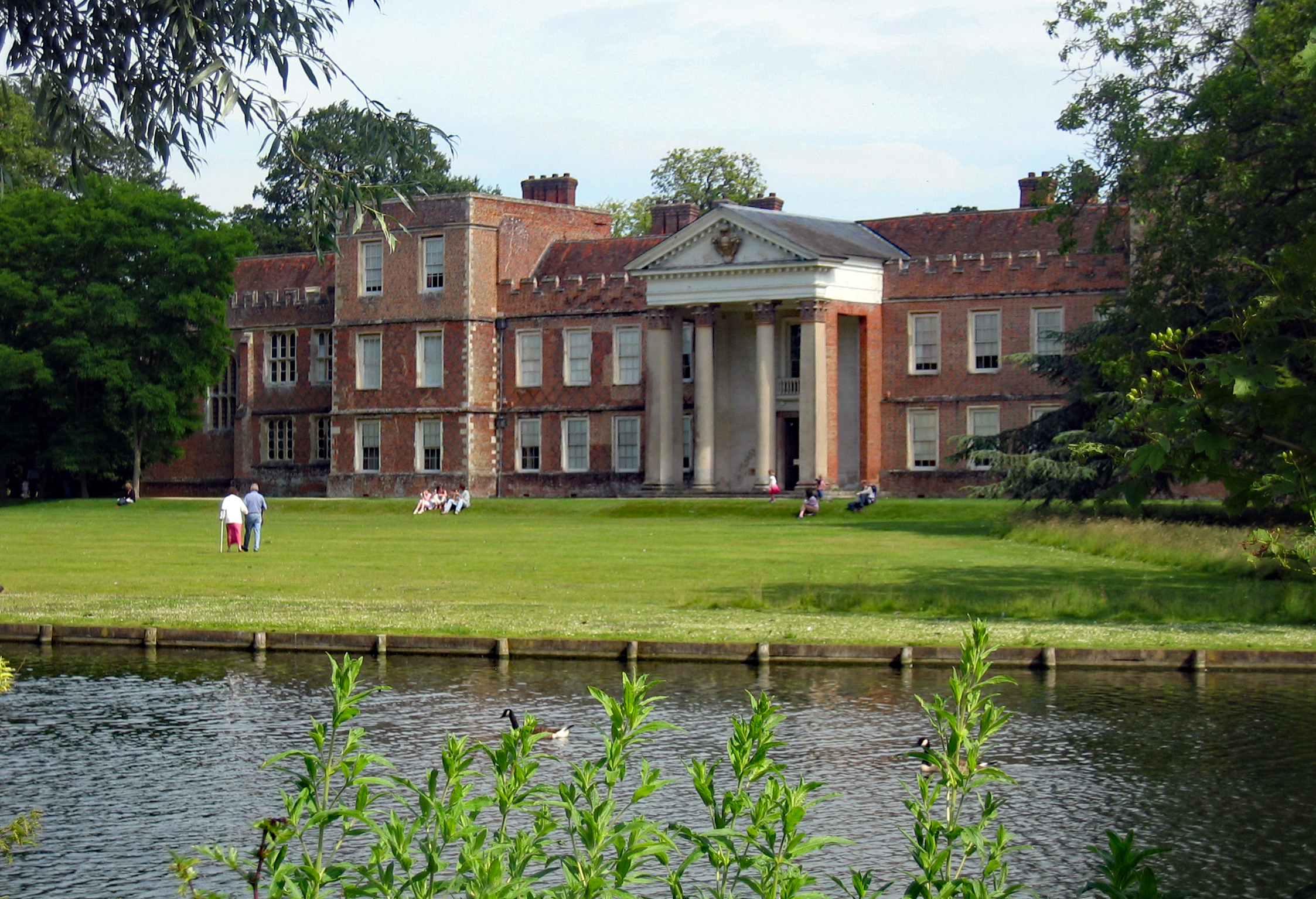
The Vyne, Hampshire, purchased by Chute in 1653

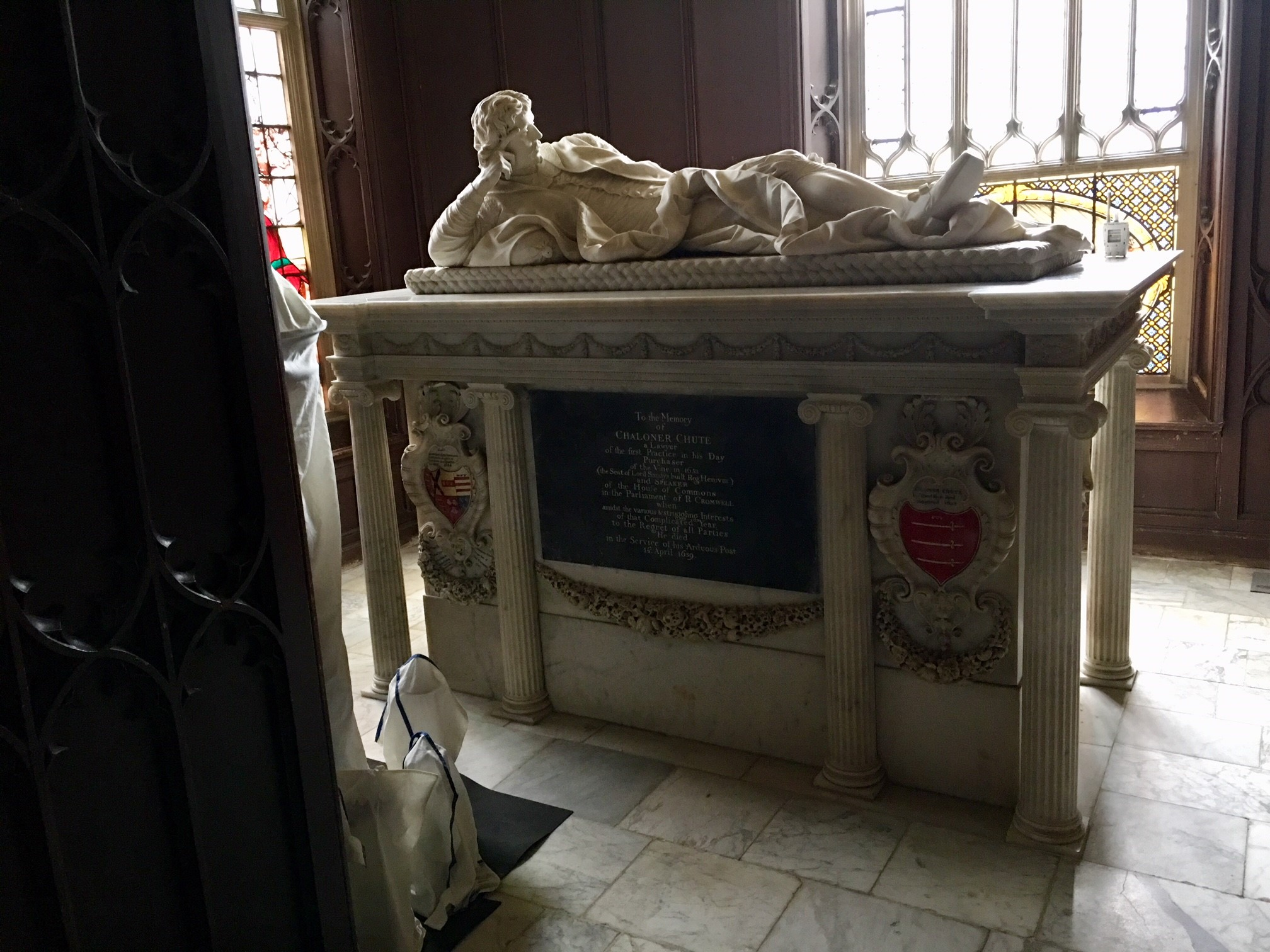
Monument to Chaloner Chute in the chapel of The Vyne

He was admitted to the Middle Temple and was called to the bar. He developed a great reputation as a defence lawyer in several high-profile cases including those of Sir Edward Herbert (the king's attorney-general), Archbishop Laud, the eleven members of the House of Commons charged by Fairfax and his army as delinquents, and James Duke of Hamilton. In 1653 he bought from Lord Sandys The Vyne, a very large Tudor manor house in Hampshire. He demolished much of the northern part of the decaying building and employed the architect John Webb, a pupil of Inigo Jones, to add the portico to the north front in the 1650s, the first of its kind on an English country house.

Chute was elected as a Member of Parliament for Middlesex in the Second Protectorate Parliament in 1656, but was prevented from taking his seat. He was elected again for Middlesex to the Third Protectorate Parliament in 1659 and became its first Speaker. However shortly afterwards he stood down because of ill health and died in April 1659.

== Memorial ==
The magnificent memorial to Chaloner Chute was commissioned by his descendant Sir John Chute (d.1776) and designed and created by Thomas Carter the Younger of London. It is made of Carrera marble and cost £335. It was begun in 1775 and completed some time after Sir John's death in 1776.

== Marriages and issue ==
Chute married twice:

- Firstly to Anne Skory, a daughter and co-heiress of Sir John Skory/Scory of Wormesley, Herefordshire, and widow of William Place of Dorking, Surrey, by whom he had issue one son and two daughters:
  - Chaloner Chute (1632-1666), son and heir, MP for Devizes, who married his step-sister Catherine Lennard, a daughter of Richard Lennard, 13th Baron Dacre.
  - Anne Chute
  - Cecilia Chute
- Secondly he married Dorothy North, a daughter of Dudley North, 3rd Baron North (1581–1666), and widow of Richard Lennard, 13th Baron Dacre (1596–1630), by whom he had no further issue.

Dorothy had been assigned the manor of Sutton Court, Chiswick in 1653, under the Commonwealth. However, following the restoration of the monarchy in 1660, Sutton Court was given to the Royalist courtier, Sir Edward Nicholas.

== See also ==
- Charles Herbert Cottrell (a descendant)

Parliament of England
Preceded by Sir James Harrington, Bt; Sir William Roberts; Josiah Berners; Edmund Harvey	Member of Parliament for Middlesex; 1656–1659; With: Sir John Barkstead 1656; Sir William Roberts 1656; William Kiffen 1656; Francis Gerard 1659	Succeeded by Not represented in Restored Rump
Political offices
Preceded by Sir Bulstrode Whitelocke	Speaker of the House of Commons; 1658-1659	Succeeded by Sir Lislebone Long
