= Sir John Austen, 1st Baronet =

Escutcheon of the Austen baronets of Derehams

Sir John Austen, 1st Baronet (after 1673 – 22 March 1742), of Derehams, South Mimms, and Highgate, Middlesex. was a British landowner and Whig politician who sat in the English and British House of Commons between 1701 and 1727.

Austen was the son of Thomas Austen, of South Mimms and Hoxton, by Arabella Forset, the daughter and heir of Edward Forset, of Ashford and Tyburn. His parents were married on 13 October 1673. He inherited the Manor of Tyburn, or Marylebone, from his mother's family and sold it in 1710 to John Holles, 1st Duke of Newcastle.

Austen was Member of Parliament for Middlesex from 1701 to 1702. He was returned again at the 1708 British general election and sat to 1710. He was created a baronet in the Baronetage of Great Britain on 16 November 1714. He stood for Middlesex at the 1715 British general election, but was defeated. However, he was returned as MP for Middlesex at the 1722 British general election but declined standing at the 1727 British general election. He also inherited the Manor of Highbury, in Islington, and sold it in 1723. In 1733, he sold the reversion of the Manor of Derhams. He died unmarried on 22 March 1742, and was buried at South Mimms with his sister Arabella, who had died in 1714. The baronetcy became extinct, while probate was granted to Mary Wright, spinster, his residuary legatee.

Parliament of England
Preceded by Warwick Lake; Hugh Smithson	Member of Parliament for Middlesex; 1701–1702; With: Warwick Lake	Succeeded by Warwick Lake; Hugh Smithson
Parliament of Great Britain
Preceded by Scorie Barker; Sir John Wolstenholme, Bt	Member of Parliament for Middlesex; 1709–1710; With: Scorie Barker	Succeeded by Hon. James Bertie; Hugh Smithson
Preceded by Hon. James Bertie; Hugh Smithson	Member of Parliament for Middlesex; 1722–1727; With: Hon. James Bertie	Succeeded by Hon. James Bertie; Sir Francis Child
Baronetage of Great Britain
New creation	Baronet (of Derehams); 1714-1742	Extinct
Preceded by Beck baronets	Austen baronets of Derehams; 16 November 1714	Succeeded by Humphreys baronets
