= Middlesex (constituency) =

Parliamentary constituency in the United Kingdom, 1801–1885

- Former county constituency for the House of Commons

1265–1885
- Seats: two
- Replaced by: Brentford, Ealing, Enfield, Hampstead, Harrow, Hornsey, Tottenham and Uxbridge
- During its existence contributed to new seat(s) of: City of London (1298) Westminster (1545) Finsbury, Marylebone and Tower Hamlets (1832) Hackney (from the Tower Hamlets constituency) (1867) Chelsea (1867) (directly)

Middlesex was a constituency of the House of Commons of the Parliament of England, then of the Parliament of Great Britain from 1707 to 1800, then of the Parliament of the United Kingdom from 1801 until abolished in 1885. It returned two members per election by various voting systems including hustings.

== Boundaries and boundary changes ==
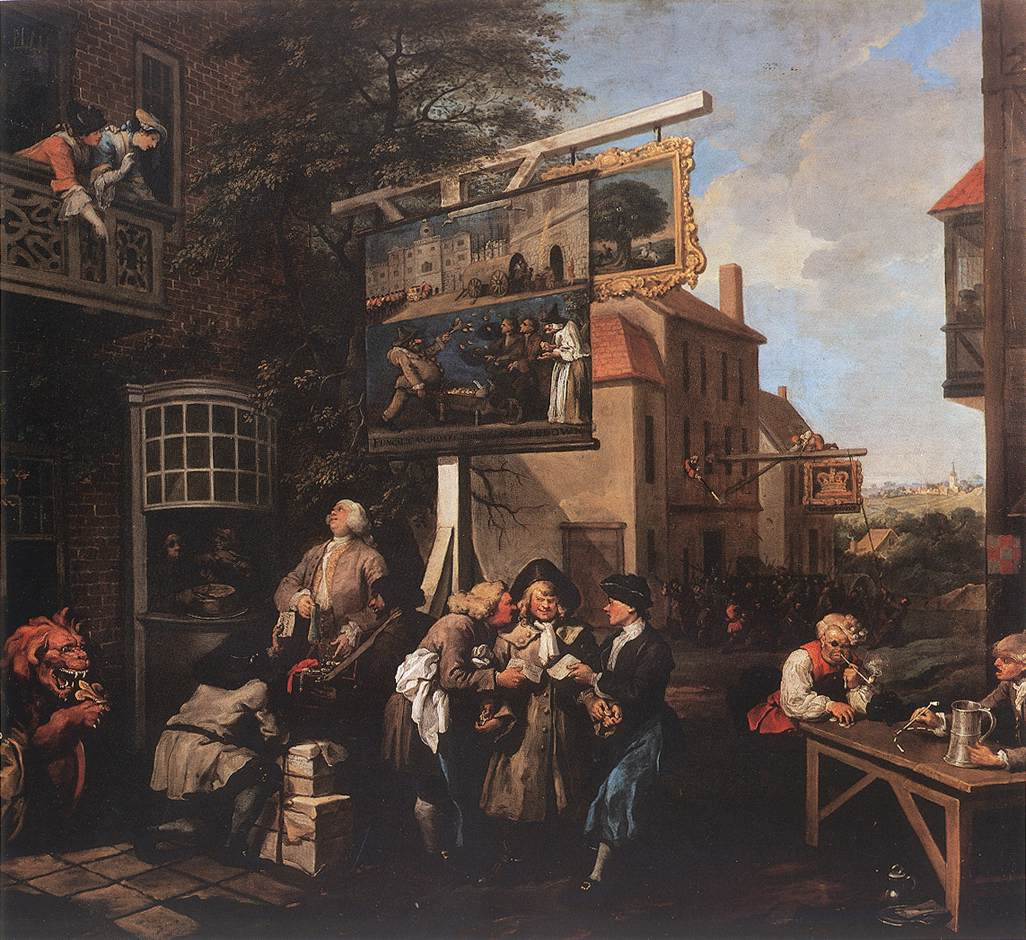
Soliciting Votes by William Hogarth, of Chiswick, Middlesex, 1754.

Map of Middlesex, drawn by Thomas Kitchin, geographer 1769 (with some towns not in the county i.e. south of the river or outside of the dashed line). It has a heading of Remarks that mentions 2 seats of Westminster and 4 of the City of London

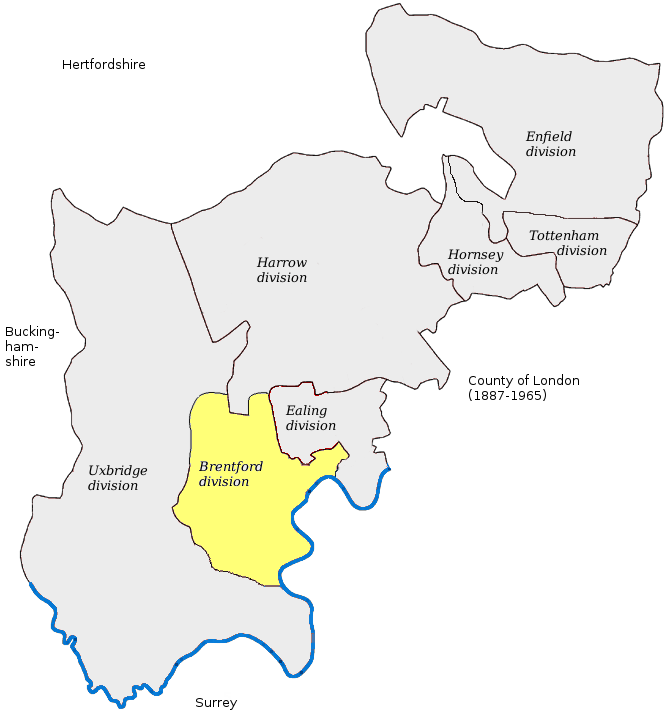
Map of the seven single-MP county constituencies created by subdivision of the final version of the seat which existed between 1867 and 1885 and returned two MPs. Brentford division is highlighted which was named after the town where the hustings took place after 1700.

This county constituency until 1832 covered all the historic county of Middlesex, in south-eastern England, comprising Spelthorne, Poyle, South Mimms and Potters Bar in other modern counties, together with the north, west, and north-west sectors of the present-day Greater London. Apart from the ability of some voters to participate in the borough franchises of the cities of London and Westminster (after dates of their inception, see top right or below), it gave rise to three more urban offshoot divisions in 1832, one of which was split in two at the next national review or reform, in 1868. Its southern boundary was the River Thames.

The county seat returned two Members of Parliament (sometimes referred to by the medieval term of knights of the shire). The place of election for the county was until 1700 at Hampstead Heath, thereafter at The Butts in the town centre of Brentford. Hustings were typically over a period of a fortnight when candidates set out their stall, and visible bribery had become not uncommon in closer contests around the country in such larger seats at the time, inspiring William Hogarth’s series of four pictures titled ‘Four Prints of An Election’ (when printed).

Until 1832 the county franchise was limited to forty shilling freeholders. The decrease in the value of money due to inflation and the expansion of the wealth and population as the urbanised area in the east around London and Westminster grew contributed to gradually expanding the electorate. The county was estimated by Henning to have about 1,660 voters in 1681. Sedgwick estimated about 3,000 in the 1715–54 period. Namier and Brook suggested there were about 3,500 in 1754–90. The number had reached about 6,000 by 1790–1820, according to Thorne. Close elections between popular candidates would therefore be expensive - the worth of being a local magistrate, major landowner or other dignitary carrying little weight among such a generally urban and numerous upper-middle class forming the bulk of the electorate.

For subsequent changes in the franchise see Reform Act 1832 and Reform Act 1867. From 1832 voters were registered; the size of the electorate is shown below.

The geographic county until 1885 also contained the borough constituencies of City of London (first recorded as having its extraordinary four members from 1298) and Westminster (enfranchised with two members from 1545). In 1832 three two-seat Boroughs were added (or enfranchised): Finsbury, Marylebone, and Tower Hamlets. In 1867 two new parliamentary boroughs each returning two MPs were constituted: 'Hackney' (St. Leonard's, Shoreditch, St Matthew's Bethnal Green and St John's Hackney) formerly represented in borough elections via Tower Hamlets and 'Chelsea' (parishes of Chelsea, Kensington, Hammersmith and Fulham). The single-member non-territorial University constituency of London University (1868–1950) was somewhat connected to the county by having most of its graduates eligible to vote.

Possession of a county electoral qualification, deriving from owning various types of property or having ecclesiastical 'offices' (controversially and sporadically defined) in an area not otherwise represented, conferred the right to vote in the county elections.

An 1885 redistribution of seats saw Middlesex and its early breakaway seats in and around the City reformed under the Redistribution of Seats Act 1885 reflecting the wider electorate of the Reform Act 1884 and need to 'liberate' boroughs, i.e. urban areas without properly apportioned representation:

- Constituencies in the urban south-east part that returned 18 MPs were replaced by 38 single-member seats.
- the City of London constituency (loosely considered with the county) was reduced from 4 to 2 members.
- the Middlesex constituency latterly covering the north, west and south-west of the county returning 2 MPs was replaced by 7 single-member seats.

Local government bodies

In 1889 the 40 urban constituencies that comprised the south-eastern part fell into (for local government) a County of London save for the much smaller City of London which remained a separate quasi-county and legal jurisdiction. The seven county divisions (constituencies) in the north and west of the historic county came under a new local government body, the administrative county of Middlesex. Both counties were also known by their governing bodies' name, County Councils (abbreviated to LCC and MCC). The seven successor seats were Brentford, Ealing, Enfield, Harrow, Hornsey, Tottenham and Uxbridge. These (and numerous later successor seats) had MCC local governance until its abolition in 1965.

== Members of Parliament ==
Preliminary note: The English civil year started on Lady Day, 25 March, until 1752 (Scotland having changed to 1 January in 1600). The year used in the lists of Parliaments in this article have been converted to the new style where necessary. Old style dates for days between 1 January and 24 March actually referred to days after 31 December. No attempt has been made to compensate for the eleven days which did not occur in September 1752 in both England and Scotland as well as other British controlled territories (when the day after 2 September was 14 September), so as to bring the British Empire fully in line with the Gregorian calendar.

Constituency created (1265): See Montfort's Parliament for further details. Knights of the shire are known to have been summoned to most Parliaments from 1290 (19th Parliament of King Edward I of England) and to every one from 1320 (19th Parliament of King Edward II of England).

=== Knights of the shire 1265–1660 ===
Some of the members elected during this period have been identified, but this list does not include parliaments where no member has been identified before the reign of King Henry VIII. In the list (as opposed to the table below) the year given is for the first meeting of the parliament, with the month added where there was more than one parliament in the year. If a second year is given this is a date of dissolution. Early parliaments usually only existed for a few days or weeks, so dissolutions in the same year as the first meeting are not recorded in this list If a specific date of election is known this is recorded in italic brackets. The Roman numerals in brackets, following some names, are those used to distinguish different politicians of the same name in 'The House of Commons' 1509-1558 and 1558–1603.

In this period, Parliament was not an institution with a regular pattern of elections and sittings. Therefore, a separate entry is made for each parliament, even if the same Knight of the Shire served in successive parliaments.

List of known Knights of the Shire before 1509

Parliament	First member	Second member
1295 (Nov)	William de Brook	Stephen de Gravesend
1296	Richard de Wyndesor	Richard le Rous
1297 (Oct)	Richard le Rous	?
1298 (Mar)	Richard le Rous	?
1298 (May)	Richard le Rous	?
1300	Richard le Rous	?
1301	Richard le Rous	?
1302 (Oct)	Richard le Rous	?
1305 (Feb)	Richard le Rous	?
1306	Richard le Rous	?
1386	Sir Adam Francis	William Swanland
1388 (Feb)	Sir Adam Francis	William Swanland
1388 (Sep)	William Barnville	Godfrey Atte Perry
1390 (Jan)	John Shorditch I	Thomas Coningsby
1390 (Nov)	John Shorditch I	Sir Adam Francis
1391	Thomas Bray	William Norton
1393	William Tamworth	Thomas Maidstone
1394	John Shorditch II	James Ormesby
1395	John Shorditch II	Thomas Coningsby
1397 (Jan)	Thomas Goodlake	Thomas Maidstone
1397 (Sep)	Sir Adam Francis	Sir John Wroth
1399	John Durham	Thomas Maidstone
1401	William Loveney	Sir John Wroth
1402	James Northampton	Thomas Coningsby
1404 (Jan)	William Wroth	Sir John Wroth
1404 (Oct)	Sir Roger Strange	William Powe
1406	Henry Somer	Sir John Wroth
1407	Henry Somer	William Loveney
1410		
1411	Sir Adam Francis	Sir Roger Strange
1413 (Feb)		
1413 (May)	William Loveney	Richard Wyot
1414 (Apr)	Simon Camp	Walter Green
1414 (Nov)	Thomas Charlton	John Walden
1415	Simon Camp	Thomas Coningsby
1416 (Mar)		
1416 (Oct)	Henry Somer	Walter Gawtron
1419	Thomas Frowyk	Thomas Coningsby
1420	Sir John Boys	Walter Green
1421 (May)	Henry Somer	Sir Thomas Charlton
1421 (Dec)	Richard Maidstone	Edmund Bibbesworth
1429	Henry Somer	
1442	Thomas Charlton	John Somerset
1447	Thomas Charlton	
1449	Thomas Charlton	
1453	Thomas Charlton	
1459	Sir Thomas Charlton	
1460	Sir Thomas Charlton	
1491	Sir Thomas Lovell	

Table of Knights of the Shire 1509-1660

Summoned	Elected	Assembled	Dissolved	First Member	Second Member
17 October 1509	1509–10	21 January 1510	23 February 1510	Sir Thomas Lovell (I)	unknown
28 November 1511	1511–12	4 February 1512	4 March 1514	unknown	unknown
23 November 1514	1514–15	5 February 1515	22 December 1515	unknown	unknown
unknown	1523	15 April 1523	13 August 1523	Sir Thomas More (I) ^{a}	unknown
9 August 1529	1529	3 November 1529	14 April 1536	Robert Wroth ^{b}	Richard Hawkes ^{c}
27 April 1536	1536	8 June 1536	18 July 1536	unknown	unknown
1 March 1539	1539	28 April 1539	24 July 1540	Sir Ralph Sadler	Robert Cheeseman
23 November 1541	1541–42	16 January 1542	28 March 1544	Robert Cheeseman	John Hughes ^{d}
1 December 1544	1544–45	23 November 1545	31 January 1547	Sir William Paget	Thomas Wroth
2 August 1547	1547	4 November 1547	15 April 1552	Sir Thomas Wroth	John Newdigate
5 January 1553	1553	1 March 1553	31 March 1553	Sir Robert Bowes	Sir Thomas Wroth
14 August 1553	1553	5 October 1553	5 December 1553	Sir Edward Hastings	John Newdigate
17 February 1554	1554	2 April 1554	3 May 1554	Sir Edward Hastings	John Newdigate
3 October 1554	1554	12 November 1554	16 January 1555	Sir Edward Hastings	Sir Roger Cholmley
3 September 1555	1555	21 October 1555	9 December 1555	Sir Edward Hastings	Sir Roger Cholmley
6 December 1557	1557–58	20 January 1558	17 November 1558	Sir Roger Cholmley	John Newdigate
5 December 1558	29 December 1558	23 January 1559	8 May 1559	Sir Roger Cholmley	Sir Thomas Wroth
10 November 1562	1562–63	11 January 1563	2 January 1567	Sir William Cordell	Sir Thomas Wroth
unknown	1571	2 April 1571	29 May 1571	Francis Newdigate	John Newdigate
28 March 1572	1572	8 May 1572	19 April 1583	Robert Wroth (I)	Sir Owen Hopton
12 October 1584	1584	23 November 1584	14 September 1585	Robert Wroth (I)	Sir Owen Hopton
15 September 1586	1586	15 October 1586	23 March 1587	Robert Wroth (I)	William Fleetwood (III)
18 September 1588	19 December 1588	4 February 1589	29 March 1589	Robert Wroth (I)	William Fleetwood (III)
4 January 1593	1593	18 February 1593	10 April 1593	Robert Wroth (I)	Francis Bacon
23 August 1597	15 September 1597	24 October 1597	9 February 1598	Sir Robert Wroth (I)	Sir John Peyton (I)
11 September 1601	8 October 1601	27 October 1601	19 December 1601	Sir John Fortescue (I)	Sir Robert Wroth (I)
31 January 1604	1604	19 March 1604	9 February 1611	Sir William Fleetwood	Sir Robert Wroth
unknown	1614	5 April 1614	7 June 1614	Sir Julius Caesar	Sir Thomas Lake
13 November 1620	1620–21	16 January 1621	8 February 1622	Sir Francis Darcy	Sir Gilbert Gerard, Bt
20 December 1623	1623–24	12 February 1624	27 March 1625	Sir Gilbert Gerard, Bt	Sir John Suckling
2 April 1625	1625	17 May 1625	12 August 1625	Sir John Francklyn	Sir Gilbert Gerard, Bt
20 December 1625	1626	6 February 1626	15 June 1626	Sir Gilbert Gerard, Bt	Sir Edward Spencer
31 January 1628	1628	17 March 1628	10 March 1629	Sir Francis Darcy	Sir Henry Spiller
1629–1640	No Parliaments summoned				
20 February 1640	1640	13 April 1640	5 May 1640	Sir John Francklyn	Sir Gilbert Gerard, Bt
24 September 1640	1640	3 November 1640	16 March 1660 ^{e}	Sir John Francklyn ^{f}	Sir Gilbert Gerard, Bt ^{g}
24 September 1640	18 May 1648	3 November 1640	16 March 1660 ^{e}	Sir Edward Spencer ^{h}	Sir Gilbert Gerard, Bt ^{g}

Notes:-

- ^{a} Speaker of the House of Commons.
- ^{b} Wroth ceased to be an MP after 11 May 1535. It is unknown if there was a by-election.
- ^{c} Hawkes ceased to be MP by May/June 1532. It is unknown if there was a by-election.
- ^{d} Hughes ceased to be an MP after January/April 1543. It is unknown if there was a by-election.
- ^{e} In theory the Long Parliament existed throughout the 1640–1660 term, as it could not be lawfully dissolved without its own consent which was not given until 1660. In practice all or part of the membership of the House of Commons were not permitted to sit for lengthy periods. Other bodies considered to be Parliaments existed within parts of the term of the Long Parliament.
- ^{f} Francklyn died and a by-election was held.
- ^{g} In December 1648, Gilbert was excluded from Parliament in Pride's Purge and the seat was left vacant.
- ^{h} Spencer is not recorded as having sat after Pride's Purge in December 1648.

Table of Members of the Commonwealth Parliaments 1653-1659

The county had three nominated members in the Barebones Parliament, four representatives in the First and Second and the usual two in the Third of the Protectorate Parliaments

Summoned	Elected	Assembled	Dissolved	First member	Second member	Third member	Fourth member
		4 July 1653	12 December 1653	Sir William Roberts	Augustine Wingfield	Arthur Squib	
1 June 1654	1654	3 September 1654	22 January 1655	Sir James Harrington, Bt	Sir William Roberts	Josiah Berners	Edmund Harvey
10 July 1656	1656	17 September 1656	4 February 1658	Sir John Barkstead	Sir William Roberts	Chaloner Chute	William Kiffen
9 December 1658	1658–59	27 January 1659	22 April 1659	Francis Gerard	Chaloner Chute		

=== Knights of the shire 1660–1885 ===
Year	1st Member	1st Party	2nd Member	2nd Party
1660	Sir Lancelot Lake	Non Partisan	Sir William Waller	Non Partisan
1661	Sir Lancelot Lake	Non Partisan	Sir Thomas Allen	Non Partisan
1679	Sir Robert Peyton	Non Partisan	Sir William Roberts, Bt	Non Partisan
1681	Robert Atkyns	Non Partisan	Sir William Roberts, Bt	Non Partisan
1681	Nicholas Raynton	Non Partisan	Sir William Roberts, Bt	Non Partisan
1685	Sir Charles Gerard, Bt	Non Partisan	Ralph Hawtrey	Non Partisan
1695	Edward Russell	Non Partisan	Sir John Wolstenholme, Bt	Non Partisan
1696	Sir John Bucknall	Non Partisan	Sir John Wolstenholme, Bt	Non Partisan
1698	Warwick Lake	Non Partisan	Sir John Wolstenholme, Bt	Non Partisan
1701	Warwick Lake	Non Partisan	Hugh Smithson	Tory
1701	Warwick Lake	Non Partisan	John Austen	Whig
1702	Warwick Lake	Non Partisan	Hugh Smithson	Tory
1705	Scorie Barker	Non Partisan	Sir John Wolstenholme, Bt	Non Partisan
1709	Scorie Barker	Non Partisan	John Austen	Whig
1710	Hon. James Bertie	Tory	Hugh Smithson	Tory
1722	Hon. James Bertie	Tory	Sir John Austen, Bt.	Whig
1727	Hon. James Bertie	Tory	Sir Francis Child	Tory
1734	William Pulteney	Whig	Sir Francis Child	Tory
1740	William Pulteney	Whig	Sir Hugh Smithson, Bt (later Sir Hugh Percy, Bt) ^{a}	Tory
1742	Sir Roger Newdigate, Bt	Tory	Sir Hugh Smithson, Bt (later Sir Hugh Percy, Bt) ^{a}	Tory
1747	Sir William Beauchamp-Proctor, Bt	Whig	Sir Hugh Smithson, Bt (later Sir Hugh Percy, Bt) ^{a}	Whig
1750	Sir William Beauchamp-Proctor, Bt	Whig	George Cooke	Tory
1768	John Wilkes	Radical	George Cooke	Tory
1768	John Wilkes	Radical	John Glynn	Whig
1769 (Feb)	John Wilkes	Radical	John Glynn	Whig
1769 (Mar)	John Wilkes	Radical	John Glynn	Whig
1769 (Apr)	Henry Luttrell	Tory	John Glynn	Whig
1774	John Wilkes	Radical	John Glynn	Whig
1779	John Wilkes	Radical	Thomas Wood	Whig
1780	John Wilkes	Radical	George Byng	Whig
1784	John Wilkes	Radical	William Mainwaring	Tory
1790	George Byng	Whig	William Mainwaring	Tory
1802	George Byng	Whig	Sir Francis Burdett, Bt	Whig
1804	George Byng	Whig	George Boulton Mainwaring	Tory
1805	George Byng	Whig	Sir Francis Burdett, Bt	Whig
1806	George Byng	Whig	George Boulton Mainwaring	Tory
1806	George Byng	Whig	William Mellish	Tory
1820	George Byng	Whig	Samuel Charles Whitbread	Whig
1830	George Byng	Whig	Joseph Hume	Radical
1837	George Byng	Whig	Thomas Wood	Conservative
1847	Lord Robert Grosvenor	Whig	Thomas Wood	Conservative
1847	Lord Robert Grosvenor	Whig	Ralph Bernal Osborne	Radical
1857	Lord Robert Grosvenor	Whig	Robert Culling Hanbury	Whig
1857	Hon. George Byng (later Viscount Enfield) ^{b}	Whig	Robert Culling Hanbury	Whig
1859	Hon. George Byng (later Viscount Enfield) ^{b}	Liberal	Robert Culling Hanbury	Liberal
1867	Hon. George Byng (later Viscount Enfield) ^{b}	Liberal	Henry Labouchère	Liberal
1868	Hon. George Byng (later Viscount Enfield) ^{b}	Liberal	Lord George Hamilton	Conservative
1874	Octavius Coope	Conservative	Lord George Hamilton	Conservative
1885	constituency divided and abolished			

Notes:-

- ^{a} Smithson, not the same man as the former member of the same name, changed his surname to Percy before the 1741 general election.
- ^{b} Byng received the courtesy title of Viscount Enfield in 1860.
- Leigh Rayment's Historical List of MPs – Constituencies beginning with "M" (part 2)

== Elections ==
=== General notes ===
In multi-member elections the bloc voting system was used. Voters could cast a vote for two candidates or "plump" for one, as they chose. The leading candidates with the largest number of votes were elected.

In by-elections, to fill a single seat, the first past the post system applied.

Table terms

Results of 1660-1790 are by History of Parliament Trust publications. The results from 1790–1832 are by Stooks Smith, thereafter his work becoming the footnotes for results by Craig.

=== Results 1660–1885 ===
==== Parliament of England ====
General election 5 April 1660: Middlesex (2 seats)
Party	Candidate	Votes	%	±%
Nonpartisan	Lancelot Lake	Elected	N/A	N/A
Nonpartisan	William Waller	Elected	N/A	N/A
Nonpartisan	Gilbert Gerard	Defeated	N/A	N/A
Nonpartisan	William Roberts	Defeated	N/A	N/A
Nonpartisan	James Harington	Defeated	N/A	N/A
Nonpartisan	John Page	Defeated	N/A	N/A

- Note (1660) vote totals unavailable

General election 4 April 1661: Middlesex (2 seats)
Party	Candidate	Votes	%	±%
Nonpartisan	Lancelot Lake	Elected	N/A	N/A
Nonpartisan	Thomas Allen	Elected	N/A	N/A
Nonpartisan	John Robinson	Defeated	N/A	N/A

- Note (1661) vote totals unavailable

General Election 21 February 1679: Middlesex (2 seats)
Party	Candidate	Votes	%	±%
Nonpartisan	Robert Peyton	Unopposed	N/A	N/A
Nonpartisan	William Roberts	Unopposed	N/A	N/A

- Note (1679): Roberts was not the same man as the 1660 candidate of the same name.

General Election 3 September 1679: Middlesex (2 seats)
Party	Candidate	Votes	%	±%
Nonpartisan	William Roberts	720	45.37	N/A
Nonpartisan	Robert Peyton	670	42.22	N/A
Nonpartisan	Francis Gerard	194	12.22	N/A
Nonpartisan	William Smyth	3	0.19	N/A

- Note (1679): Smyth is referred to as Smith in House of Commons 1660-1690, but Smyth seems to be correct from Leigh Rayment's list of baronets.
- Expulsion from the House of Peyton

By-Election 13 January 1681: Middlesex
Party	Candidate	Votes	%	±%
Nonpartisan	Robert Atkyns	680	55.78	+55.78
Nonpartisan	Hugh Middleton	379	31.09	+31.09
Nonpartisan	Charles Umfrevile	160	13.13	+13.13
Majority		301	24.69	N/A
Nonpartisan hold		Swing	N/A	

General election 3 March 1681: Middlesex (2 seats)
Party	Candidate	Votes	%	±%
Nonpartisan	William Roberts	1,054	35.73	+35.73
Nonpartisan	Nicholas Raynton	874	29.63	+29.63
Nonpartisan	Hugh Middleton	607	20.58	−10.51
Nonpartisan	Charles Gerard	415	14.07	+14.07

General election 18 March 1685: Middlesex (2 seats)
Party	Candidate	Votes	%	±%
Nonpartisan	Charles Gerard	Elected	N/A	N/A
Nonpartisan	Roger Hawtrey	Elected	N/A	N/A
Nonpartisan	Hugh Middleton	Defeated	N/A	N/A
Nonpartisan	Nicholas Raynton	Defeated	N/A	N/A
Nonpartisan	Thomas Johnson	Defeated	N/A	N/A
Nonpartisan	William Smyth	Defeated	N/A	N/A

- Note (1685) vote totals unavailable. Smyth is referred to as Smith in House of Commons 1660-1690, but Smyth seems to be correct from Leigh Rayment's list of baronets.

General election 11 January 1689: Middlesex (2 seats)
Party	Candidate	Votes	%	±%
Nonpartisan	Charles Gerard	Elected	N/A	N/A
Nonpartisan	Roger Hawtrey	Elected	N/A	N/A
Nonpartisan	Robert Peyton	Defeated	N/A	N/A
Nonpartisan	Thomas Johnson	Defeated	N/A	N/A

- Note (1689) vote totals unavailable

General election 1690: Middlesex (2 seats)
Party	Candidate	Votes	%	±%
Nonpartisan	Charles Gerard	Unopposed	N/A	N/A
Nonpartisan	Roger Hawtrey	Unopposed	N/A	N/A

General election 14 November 1695: Middlesex (2 seats)
Party	Candidate	Votes	%	±%
Nonpartisan	Edward Russell	Unopposed	N/A	N/A
Nonpartisan	John Wolstenholme	Unopposed	N/A	N/A

- Choice of Russell to sit for Cambridgeshire

By-Election 8 January 1696: Middlesex
Party	Candidate	Votes	%	±%
Nonpartisan	John Bucknall	Unopposed	N/A	N/A
Nonpartisan hold		Swing	N/A	

General election 4 August 1698: Middlesex (2 seats)
Party	Candidate	Votes	%	±%
Nonpartisan	Warwick Lake	Unopposed	N/A	N/A
Nonpartisan	John Wolstenholme	Unopposed	N/A	N/A

General Election 16 January 1701: Middlesex (2 seats)
Party	Candidate	Votes	%	±%
Nonpartisan	Warwick Lake	Unopposed	N/A	N/A
Tory	Hugh Smithson	Unopposed	N/A	N/A

General Election 3 December 1701: Middlesex (2 seats)
Party	Candidate	Votes	%	±%
Nonpartisan	Warwick Lake	Unopposed	N/A	N/A
Whig	John Austen	Unopposed	N/A	N/A

General election 30 July 1702: Middlesex (2 seats)
Party	Candidate	Votes	%	±%
Nonpartisan	Warwick Lake	Unopposed	N/A	N/A
Tory	Hugh Smithson	Unopposed	N/A	N/A

General election 28 May 1705: Middlesex (2 seats)
Party	Candidate	Votes	%	±%
Nonpartisan	Scorie Barker	Unopposed	N/A	N/A
Nonpartisan	John Wolstenholme	Unopposed	N/A	N/A

==== Parliament of Great Britain ====
General election 1708: Middlesex (2 seats)
Party	Candidate	Votes	%	±%
Nonpartisan	Scorie Barker	Unopposed	N/A	N/A
Nonpartisan	John Wolstenholme	Unopposed	N/A	N/A

- Death of Wolstenholme

By-Election 3 March 1709: Middlesex
Party	Candidate	Votes	%	±%
Whig	John Austen	Unopposed	N/A	N/A
Whig gain from Nonpartisan		Swing	N/A	

General election 12 October 1710: Middlesex (2 seats)
Party	Candidate	Votes	%	±%
Tory	James Bertie	Unopposed	N/A	N/A
Tory	Hugh Smithson	Unopposed	N/A	N/A

General election 1713: Middlesex (2 seats)
Party	Candidate	Votes	%	±%
Tory	James Bertie	Unopposed	N/A	N/A
Tory	Hugh Smithson	Unopposed	N/A	N/A

General election 27 January 1715: Middlesex (2 seats)
Party	Candidate	Votes	%	±%
Tory	James Bertie	1,604	27.60	N/A
Tory	Hugh Smithson	1,553	26.72	N/A
Whig	John Austen	1,330	22.80	N/A
Whig	Henry Barker	1,325	22.80	N/A

General election 30 March 1722: Middlesex (2 seats)
Party	Candidate	Votes	%	±%
Tory	James Bertie	1,800	39.43	+11.83
Whig	John Austen	967	21.18	−1.62
Whig	Henry Barker	908	18.89	−3.91
Tory	George Cooke	662	14.50	+14.50
Tory	William Withers	228	5.00	+5.00

General election 6 September 1727: Middlesex (2 seats)
Party	Candidate	Votes	%	±%
Tory	James Bertie	1,410	29.21	−10.22
Tory	Francis Child	1,305	27.03	+27.03
Whig	Henry Barker	1,074	22.25	+3.36
Whig	Lord Paget	1,039	21.52	+21.52

General election 25 April 1734: Middlesex (2 seats)
Party	Candidate	Votes	%	±%
Tory	Francis Child	Unopposed	N/A	N/A
Whig	William Pulteney	Unopposed	N/A	N/A

- Death of Child

By-Election 15 March 1740: Middlesex
Party	Candidate	Votes	%	±%
Tory	Hugh Smithson	382	72.21	N/A
Whig	Henry Barker	147	27.79	N/A
Majority		235	44.42	N/A
Tory hold		Swing	N/A	

- Smithson (not the same person as the former MP of the same name) subsequently changed his surname to Percy

General election 14 May 1741: Middlesex (2 seats)
Party	Candidate	Votes	%	±%
Whig	William Pulteney	Unopposed	N/A	N/A
Tory	Hugh Percy	Unopposed	N/A	N/A

- Creation of Pulteney as 1st Earl of Bath

By-Election 5 August 1742: Middlesex
Party	Candidate	Votes	%	±%
Tory	Roger Newdigate	Unopposed	N/A	N/A
Tory gain from Whig		Swing	N/A	

General election 2 July 1747: Middlesex (2 seats)
Party	Candidate	Votes	%	±%
Whig	Hugh Percy	1,797	36.33	N/A
Whig	William Beauchamp-Proctor	1,457	29.45	N/A
Tory	George Cooke	899	18.17	N/A
Tory	Roger Newdigate	794	16.05	N/A

- Succession of Percy as 2nd Earl of Northumberland

By-Election 8 March 1750: Middlesex
Party	Candidate	Votes	%	±%
Tory	George Cooke	1,617	57.38	+39.21
Whig	Fraser Honywood	1,201	42.62	+42.62
Majority		416	14.76	N/A
Tory gain from Whig		Swing	N/A	

General election 2 May 1754: Middlesex (2 seats)
Party	Candidate	Votes	%	±%
Tory	George Cooke	Unopposed	N/A	N/A
Whig	William Beauchamp-Proctor	Unopposed	N/A	N/A

General election 7 April 1761: Middlesex (2 seats)
Party	Candidate	Votes	%	±%
Tory	George Cooke	Unopposed	N/A	N/A
Whig	William Beauchamp-Proctor	Unopposed	N/A	N/A

- Appointment of Cooke as Joint Paymaster of the Forces

By-Election 27 November 1766: Middlesex
Party	Candidate	Votes	%	±%
Tory	George Cooke	Unopposed	N/A	N/A
Tory hold		Swing	N/A	

General election 28 March 1768: Middlesex (2 seats)
Party	Candidate	Votes	%	±%
Radical	John Wilkes	1,297	44.33	N/A
Tory	George Cooke	827	28.26	N/A
Whig	William Beauchamp-Proctor	802	27.41	N/A

- Note (1768): Stooks Smith attributes 1,292 votes to Wilkes. Stooks Smith does not give candidates party labels in Middlesex until after this election.
- Death of Cooke

By-Election 14 December 1768: Middlesex
Party	Candidate	Votes	%	±%
Whig	John Glynn	1,548	54.89	+54.89
Tory	William Beauchamp-Proctor	1,272	45.11	+17.70
Majority		276	9.79	N/A
Whig gain from Tory		Swing	N/A	

- Note (1768): Poll 6 days (Source: Stooks Smith)
- Expulsion from the House of Wilkes, declared incapable of being elected 3 February 1769

By-Election 16 February 1769: Middlesex
Party	Candidate	Votes	%	±%
Radical	John Wilkes	Unopposed	N/A	N/A
Radical hold		Swing	N/A	

- Expulsion from the House of Wilkes, election declared void

By-Election 16 March 1769: Middlesex
Party	Candidate	Votes	%	±%
Radical	John Wilkes	Unopposed	N/A	N/A
Radical hold		Swing	N/A	

- Expulsion from the House of Wilkes, election declared void 17 March 1769

By-Election 13 April 1769: Middlesex
Party	Candidate	Votes	%	±%
Radical	John Wilkes	1,143	79.16	N/A
Tory	Henry Luttrell	296	20.50	N/A
Whig	William Whitaker	5	0.35	N/A
Majority		847	58.66	N/A
Radical hold		Swing	N/A	

- Election return of Wilkes amended to Luttrell by Parliament on 14 April 1769 and Luttrell seated as the MP 15 April 1769

General election 20 October 1774: Middlesex (2 seats)
Party	Candidate	Votes	%	±%
Whig	John Glynn	Unopposed	N/A	N/A
Radical	John Wilkes	Unopposed	N/A	N/A

- Death of Glynn

By-Election 28 October 1779: Middlesex
Party	Candidate	Votes	%	±%
Whig	Thomas Wood	Unopposed	N/A	N/A
Whig hold		Swing	N/A	

General election 14 September 1780: Middlesex (2 seats)
Party	Candidate	Votes	%	±%
Whig	George Byng	Unopposed	N/A	N/A
Radical	John Wilkes	Unopposed	N/A	N/A

General election 22 April 1784: Middlesex (2 seats)
Party	Candidate	Votes	%	±%
Tory	William Mainwaring	2,118	36.72	N/A
Radical	John Wilkes	1,858	32.21	N/A
Whig	George Byng	1,792	31.07	N/A

General election 28 June 1790: Middlesex (2 seats)
Party	Candidate	Votes	%	±%
Whig	George Byng	Unopposed	N/A	N/A
Tory	William Mainwaring	Unopposed	N/A	N/A

- Note (1790): The George Byng who contested Middlesex elections from this year is a different person from the one who stood previously

General election 3 June 1796: Middlesex (2 seats)
Party	Candidate	Votes	%	±%
Whig	George Byng	Unopposed	N/A	N/A
Tory	William Mainwaring	Unopposed	N/A	N/A

==== Parliament of the United Kingdom ====
General election 13 July 1802: Middlesex (2 seats)
Party	Candidate	Votes	%	±%
Whig	George Byng	3,848	38.5	N/A
Radical	Francis Burdett	3,207	32.1	N/A
Tory	William Mainwaring	2,936	29.4	N/A
Majority		269	2.7	N/A
Turnout		9,991		
Radical gain from Tory		Swing		
Whig hold		Swing		

- Note (1802): Poll 15 days (Source: Stooks Smith)
- Election of Burdett declared void 9 July 1804

By-Election 23 July 1804: Middlesex
Party	Candidate	Votes	%	±%
Tory	George Boulton Mainwaring	2,828	50.0	+20.6
Radical	Francis Burdett	2,823	50.0	+17.9
Majority		5	0.0	N/A
Turnout		5,651		
Tory gain from Radical		Swing		

- Note (1804): Poll 15 days (Source: Stooks Smith)
- Election of Mainwaring challenged by a petition of Burdett. Mainwaring unseated and Francis Burdett seated on 5 March 1805. (Source: The Times (of London), edition of 6 March 1805)
- Election of Burdett challenged by a petition of Mainwaring. Burdett unseated and George Boulton Mainwaring seated with effect from 10 February 1806. (Source: The Times (of London), edition of 10 February 1806)

General election 10 November 1806: Middlesex (2 seats)
Party	Candidate	Votes	%	±%
Tory	William Mellish	3,213	47.9	+18.5
Whig	George Byng	2,304	34.3	−4.2
Radical	Francis Burdett	1,197	17.8	−18.3
Majority		1,107	16.5	N/A
Turnout		6,714		
Whig gain from Radical		Swing		
Tory hold		Swing		

- Note (1806): Poll 15 days (Source: Stooks Smith)

General election 18 May 1807: Middlesex (2 seats)
Party	Candidate	Votes	%	±%
Tory	William Mellish	2,706	42.8	−5.1
Whig	George Byng	2,368	37.4	+3.1
Tory	Sir Christopher Baynes, 1st Baronet	1,252	19.8	+19.8
Majority		116	18.6	+2.1
Turnout		6,326		
Tory hold		Swing		
Whig hold		Swing		

General election 12 October 1812: Middlesex (2 seats)
Party	Candidate	Votes	%	±%
Whig	George Byng	Unopposed		
Tory	William Mellish	Unopposed		
Whig hold				
Tory hold				

General election 26 June 1818: Middlesex (2 seats)
Party	Candidate	Votes	%	±%
Whig	George Byng	Unopposed		
Tory	William Mellish	Unopposed		
Whig hold				
Tory hold				

General election 17 March 1820: Middlesex (2 seats)
Party	Candidate	Votes	%	±%
Whig	George Byng	4,004	37.6	N/A
Whig	Samuel Charles Whitbread	3,585	33.6	N/A
Tory	William Mellish	3,073	28.8	N/A
Majority		512	4.8	N/A
Turnout		10,662		
Whig gain from Tory		Swing		
Whig hold		Swing		

- Note (1820): Poll 12 days (Source: Stooks Smith)

General election 1826: Middlesex (2 seats)
Party	Candidate	Votes	%	±%
Whig	George Byng	Unopposed		
Whig	Samuel Charles Whitbread	Unopposed		
Whig hold				
Whig hold				

General election 5 August 1830: Middlesex (2 seats)
Party	Candidate	Votes	%
Whig	George Byng	Unopposed	
Radical	Joseph Hume	Unopposed	
Whig hold			
Radical gain from Whig			

General election 1831: Middlesex (2 seats)
Party	Candidate	Votes	%
Whig	George Byng	Unopposed	
Radical	Joseph Hume	Unopposed	
Whig hold			
Radical hold			

General election 1832: Middlesex (2 seats)
Party	Candidate	Votes	%
Radical	Joseph Hume	3,238	36.9
Whig	George Byng	3,033	34.6
Tory	Charles Forbes	1,494	17.0
Radical	John Scott Lillie	1,004	11.4
Turnout		5,132	74.0
Registered electors		6,939	
Majority		205	2.3
Radical hold			
Majority		1,539	17.6
Whig hold			

General election 1835: Middlesex (2 seats)
Party	Candidate	Votes	%	±%
Whig	George Byng	3,505	37.7	+3.1
Radical	Joseph Hume	3,096	33.3	−15.0
Conservative	Thomas Wood	2,707	29.1	+12.1
Turnout		6,046	75.5	+1.5
Registered electors		8,005		
Majority		409	4.4	−13.2
Whig hold		Swing	+5.3	
Majority		389	4.2	+1.9
Radical hold		Swing	−13.6	

- Note (1835): The Thomas Wood who contested Middlesex elections from this year is a different person from the one who was elected in 1779

General election 31 July 1837: Middlesex (2 seats)
Party	Candidate	Votes	%	±%
Whig	George Byng	4,796	26.6	−11.1
Conservative	Thomas Wood	4,582	25.4	+10.9
Radical	Joseph Hume	4,380	24.3	−9.0
Conservative	Henry Pownall	4,273	23.7	+9.2
Turnout		9,260	72.2	−3.3
Registered electors		12,817		
Majority		214	1.2	−3.2
Whig hold		Swing	−10.6	
Majority		202	1.1	N/A
Conservative gain from Radical		Swing	+7.7	

General election 1841: Middlesex (2 seats)
Party	Candidate	Votes	%	±%
Whig	George Byng	Unopposed		
Conservative	Thomas Wood	Unopposed		
Registered electors		13,915		
Whig hold				
Conservative hold				

Byng's death caused a by-election.

By-election, 3 February 1847: Middlesex
Party	Candidate	Votes	%	±%
Whig	Robert Grosvenor	Unopposed		
Whig hold				
Registered electors		12,577		

12577

General election 4 August 1847: Middlesex (2 seats)
Party	Candidate	Votes	%	±%
Whig	Robert Grosvenor	4,944	39.3	N/A
Radical	Ralph Bernal Osborne	4,175	33.2	N/A
Conservative	Thomas Wood	3,458	27.5	N/A
Turnout		6,289 (est)	45.6 (est)	N/A
Registered electors		13,781		
Majority		769	6.1	N/A
Whig hold		Swing	N/A	
Majority		717	5.7	N/A
Radical gain from Conservative		Swing	N/A	

General election 1852: Middlesex (2 seats)
Party	Candidate	Votes	%	±%
Whig	Robert Grosvenor	5,241	37.7	−1.6
Radical	Ralph Bernal Osborne	4,390	31.6	−1.6
Conservative	John Spencer-Churchill	4,258	30.7	+3.2
Turnout		6,945 (est)	47.5 (est)	+1.9
Registered electors		14,610		
Majority		851	6.1	—
Whig hold		Swing	−1.6	
Majority		132	0.9	−4.8
Radical hold		Swing	−1.6	

General election 29 April 1857: Middlesex (2 seats)
Party	Candidate	Votes	%	±%
Whig	Robert Culling Hanbury	5,426	39.7	+8.1
Whig	Robert Grosvenor	5,327	38.9	+1.2
Conservative	Henry Cadogan	2,928	21.4	−9.3
Majority		2,399	17.5	+11.4
Turnout		8,305 (est)	55.4 (est)	+7.9
Registered electors		14,977		
Whig hold		Swing	+6.4	
Whig gain from Radical		Swing	+2.9	

- Creation of Grosvenor as 1st Baron Ebury

By-election, 3 September 1857: Middlesex
Party	Candidate	Votes	%	±%
Whig	George Byng	Unopposed		
Whig hold				

General election 1859: Middlesex (2 seats)
Party	Candidate	Votes	%	±%
Liberal	Robert Culling Hanbury	3,678	43.6	+3.9
Liberal	George Byng	3,618	42.9	+4.0
Conservative	James Haig	1,147	13.6	−7.8
Majority		2,471	29.3	+11.8
Turnout		4,795 (est)	31.6 (est)	−23.8
Registered electors		15,171		
Liberal hold		Swing	+3.9	
Liberal hold		Swing	+4.0	

- Byng became known by the courtesy title of Viscount Enfield when his father became 2nd Earl of Strafford in 1860

General election 1865: Middlesex (2 seats)
Party	Candidate	Votes	%	±%
Liberal	George Byng	Unopposed		
Liberal	Robert Culling Hanbury	Unopposed		
Registered electors		14,847		
Liberal hold				
Liberal hold				

- Death of Hanbury

By-election 15 April 1867: Middlesex
Party	Candidate	Votes	%	±%
Liberal	Henry Labouchere	Unopposed		
Liberal hold				

General election 21 November 1868: Middlesex (2 seats)
Party	Candidate	Votes	%	±%
Conservative	George Hamilton	7,850	37.9	New
Liberal	George Byng	6,487	31.3	N/A
Liberal	Henry Labouchere	6,397	30.9	N/A
Majority		1,453	7.0	N/A
Turnout		14,292 (est)	56.7 (est)	N/A
Registered electors		25,196		
Conservative gain from Liberal		Swing	N/A	
Liberal hold		Swing	N/A	

General election 14 February 1874: Middlesex (2 seats)
Party	Candidate	Votes	%	±%
Conservative	George Hamilton	10,343	33.3	+14.3
Conservative	Octavius Coope	9,867	31.8	+12.8
Liberal	George Byng	5,623	18.1	−13.2
Liberal	Frederick Lehmann	5,192	16.7	−14.2
Majority		4,244	13.7	N/A
Turnout		15,513 (est)	61.9 (est)	+5.2
Registered electors		25,071		
Conservative hold		Swing	+14.0	
Conservative gain from Liberal		Swing	+13.3	

- Appointment of Hamilton as Vice-President of the Privy Council Committee on Education

By-election, 12 April 1878: Middlesex
Party	Candidate	Votes	%	±%
Conservative	George Hamilton	Unopposed		
Conservative hold				

General election 1880: Middlesex (2 seats)
Party	Candidate	Votes	%	±%
Conservative	George Hamilton	12,904	37.8	+4.5
Conservative	Octavius Coope	12,328	36.1	+4.3
Liberal	Herbert Gladstone	8,876	26.0	−8.8
Majority		3,452	10.1	−3.6
Turnout		21,492 (est)	70.0 (est)	+8.1
Registered electors		30,707		
Conservative hold		Swing	+4.5	
Conservative hold		Swing	+4.4	

- Appointment of Hamilton as First Lord of the Admiralty

By-election, 3 July 1885: Middlesex
Party	Candidate	Votes	%	±%
Conservative	George Hamilton	Unopposed		
Conservative hold				

- Constituency divided in the 1885 redistribution

== See also ==
- List of former United Kingdom Parliament constituencies
- Unreformed House of Commons
- List of parliaments of England
- Duration of English, British and United Kingdom parliaments from 1660
