= Robert Hanbury =

Robert Hanbury may refer to:

- Robert William Hanbury (1845–1903), British Conservative politician
- Robert Culling Hanbury (1823–1867), British Liberal and Whig politician
