= John Franklyn =

English politician

Sir John Franklyn (or Francklin; 22 April 1600 – 24 March 1648) of Dollis Hill, Middlesex was an English politician who sat in the House of Commons at various times between 1625 and 1648.

Franklyn was the son of Richard Franklyn and his wife Frances Roberts, daughter of Francis Roberts of Willesden. He was knighted on 2 October 1614.

In 1625, Franklyn was elected Member of Parliament for Middlesex. In April 1640, he was re-elected MP for Middlesex in the Short Parliament and re-elected in November 1640 for the Long Parliament.

He died in 1648 and was buried in the church of St Mary Willesden, where his monument in black and white marble was the work of Sir John Colt. He had married Elizabeth, the daughter of George Purefoy of Wadley, Berkshire, with whom he had 10 sons (3 of whom predeceased him) and 7 daughters (of whom 1 predeceased him). Their son Richard Franklin, MP was created a baronet.

Parliament of England
Preceded by Sir Gilbert Gerard, Bt; Sir John Suckling	Member of Parliament for Middlesex; 1625; With: Sir Gilbert Gerard, Bt	Succeeded by Sir Gilbert Gerard, Bt; Sir Edward Spencer
Vacant Parliament suspended since 1629	Member of Parliament for Middlesex; 1640–1648; With: Sir Gilbert Gerard, Bt	Succeeded by Sir Gilbert Gerard, Bt; Sir Edward Spencer
