= Thomas Allen (Cavalier) =

17th-century English politician

Sir Thomas Allen DL JP (24 April 1603 – 18 August 1681) was an English politician, Royalist and lawyer.

== Biography ==
Allen was the only son of Edward Allen, a London fishmonger, and his wife Elizabeth, daughter of William Bennett. He was educated at Gray's Inn and then at St John's College, Oxford, where he graduated with a Bachelor of Arts in 1622 and a Master of Arts in 1626.

Allen became a governor of Barnet Grammar School in 1634 and was knighted in 1639. During the English Civil War, he was first Commissioner for Assessment, then of Array. After The Restoration he served as Commissioner of Oyer and Terminer for London and Middlesex in 1660, and was appointed deputy lieutenant and justice of the peace of the latter county a year later. In 1661, Allen entered the English House of Commons, sitting for Middlesex until 1679.

Allen died in 1681 and was buried in Finchley.

== Family ==
In 1627, Allen married Mary, youngest daughter of Sir John Weld, and had by her seven daughters and six sons.

Parliament of England
Preceded by Sir Lancelot Lake; Sir William Waller	Member of Parliament for Middlesex; 1661–1679; With: Sir Lancelot Lake	Succeeded by Sir Robert Peyton; Sir William Roberts, Bt
