= James Bertie =

British Tory politician

James Bertie (13 March 1674 – 18 October 1735) of Stanwell and Westminster, Middlesex, was a British Tory politician who sat in the English and British House of Commons for 34 years between 1695 and 1734.

== Early life and marriage ==
Bertie was born in 1674, the second son of James Bertie, 5th Baron Norreys, later created Earl of Abingdon, and his wife Eleanor Lee, the elder daughter of Sir Henry Lee, 3rd Baronet and his wife Ann Danvers. A younger brother was Henry Bertie, MP, one of the Lords Proprietors of Carolina. On 5 January 1692, he married Hon. Elizabeth Willoughby, the daughter of George Willoughby, 7th Baron Willoughby of Parham.

Elizabeth had been left an extensive legacy by her great-uncle John Cary (died 1686), including the manor of Stanwell, on the condition that she would marry Lord Guilford within three years of his death; the inheritance otherwise to go to Anthony Cary, 5th Viscount of Falkland (died 1694), John's first cousin twice removed, and his heirs and afterwards to Edward Cary (died 1692), John's first cousin, and his heirs. Her trustees came to an agreement with Falkland and Edward Cary to allow her to enjoy the estate for life, notwithstanding her failure to marry Lord Guilford, and she afterwards married Bertie. However, the agreement ended upon the deaths of Edward Cary and Falkland, and when Edward's son Lucius succeeded Anthony in the peerage, his guardian sued Elizabeth to claim the estate. The Court of Chancery found in favour of Lord Falkland in 1698, and Bertie appealed the decree to the House of Lords. He was successful in obtaining a life interest for Elizabeth in the Stanwell estate, with reversion to Lord Falkland, but a paper circulated by his brother Robert on his behalf abused Lord Chancellor Somers in such terms as to create a scandal, for which Lord Abingdon was compelled to apologise in the Lords.

== Career ==
Bertie was returned unopposed as Member of Parliament for New Woodstock at the 1695 general election, and was returned unopposed again in 1698 and at the two general elections of 1701. He was elected in a contest at the 1702 general election, but stood down in favour of his brother Charles in 1705. He did not stand in 1708.

At the 1710 general election Bertie was elected MP for Middlesex. In 1712 he was appointed Commissioner for sewers for Tower Hamlets. He was returned unopposed at Middlesex in 1713. In 1714, he became a Commissioner for the Trent navigation, and also steward of Grosmont, Skenfrith and White Castle in the Duchy of Lancaster, a post he held until 1720. He was elected for Middlesex in a contest at the 1715 general election and thereafter opposed the Whig Government in all votes of record. Although the Stanwell estate passed to Lord Falkland upon his wife's death that year, Bertie's personal electoral influence in Middlesex remained strong. In the 1722 election, he was returned both in Middlesex, where he headed the poll, and at Westbury, where his brother Lord Abingdon was lord of the manor. He and Francis Annesley, also standing on the Bertie interest, were returned in place of the sitting members, Lord Carbery and Charles Allanson; while Carbery and Allanson had a better claim to the seat, their election petition was disqualified on technical grounds. Bertie chose to sit for Middlesex, and Carbery was returned for Westbury at the ensuing by-election.

On 2 December 1724, (Note: Watson & Gauci erroneously give the date, with reference to Knatchbull's parliamentary diary, as 22 November, but the diary and the journals of the House of Commons agree on 2 December as the date.) Bertie seconded a motion by John Barnard for a committee to inquire into the crimes committed in Wapping, where debtors fleeing bailiffs had gathered and terrorised the neighbourhood after the abolition of their former sanctuaries. He served on the committee of inquiry, which reported out the bill that became the Shelterers in Wapping, Stepney, etc. Act 1724. He again headed the poll in Middlesex at the 1727 election, but did not stand for that borough in the 1734 election. He appears to have been the James Bertie who was defeated at Westbury in that election; (Note: The petitioners are termed "the Honourable James Bertie, Esq., and William Phipps, Esq." in a contemporary report; at the time, he was the only James Bertie entitled to the style "the Honourable" as the son of a peer. Phipps may have been William Phipps of Heywood, Wiltshire.) he petitioned against the election result, but this was disallowed when he failed to produce the requisite property qualification.

== Later life and legacy ==
Some time after his first wife's death in 1715, Bertie married Elizabeth Calvert, the daughter of Rev. George Calvert, rector of Stanwell.

Bertie died on 18 October 1735. He had ten sons and four daughters by his first wife, although five of the sons and three of the daughters predeceased him. He had no children by his second wife. His children included:

- Willoughby Bertie, 3rd Earl of Abingdon (1692–1760)
- Edward Bertie (d. 21 September 1733), barrister
- Rev. William Bertie (d. 29 August 1757), rector of Albury, married his first cousin Hon. Anne Bulkeley, daughter of Richard Bulkeley, 4th Viscount Bulkeley and had issue
- Henry Bertie
- Rev. John Bertie (d. 1 February 1774), rector of Kenn, prebendary of Exeter Cathedral, married Mary Nicholas and had issue
- Bridget Bertie (d. 1734), married Robert Coytmore (c.1691–1725) and had issue

== Notes ==
Parliament of England
Preceded by Sir Thomas Littleton; Thomas Wheate	Member of Parliament for Woodstock; 1695–1705; With: Sir Thomas Littleton 1695–1702; Sir William Glynne 1702–1705	Succeeded by William Cadogan; Hon. Charles Bertie
Parliament of Great Britain
Preceded by Scorie Barker; John Austen	Member of Parliament for Middlesex; 1710–1734; With: Hugh Smithson 1710–1722; Sir John Austen 1722–1727; Sir Francis Child 1727–1734	Succeeded by Sir Francis Child; William Pulteney
Preceded by The Lord Carbery; Charles Allanson	Member of Parliament for Westbury; 1722–1724; With: Francis Annesley	Succeeded by Francis Annesley; The Lord Carbery
