= Sir William Roberts, 1st Baronet =

English landowner and politician

Sir William Roberts, 1st Baronet (21 June 1638 – 14 March 1688), of Willesden in Middlesex, was an English landowner and politician.

The son of Sir William Roberts, a Member of Parliament and of Cromwell's House of Peers during the English Commonwealth, Roberts was created a baronet on 4 October 1661. The following year, on his father's death, he inherited considerable property in what is now North London which was, however, much encumbered with mortgages and legacies. Described as a "very careless man", he dissipated his fortune, engaging in litigation against his mother over the disposal of his father's bequests, and falling deeper and deeper into debt. He sold an estate at Kilburn in 1664, two estates in Harlesden in 1665–1666 and 1671, and he was preparing to pay his debts by selling Oxgate when he died in 1688. The family seat of Neasden House he never sold, but mortgaged it so recklessly that it passed into the temporary possession of the mortgagee.

He was succeeded in the baronetcy by his son, also called William.

Parliament of England
Preceded by Sir Lancelot Lake; Sir Thomas Allen	Member of Parliament for Middlesex; 1679–1685; With: Sir Robert Peyton 1679–1681; Robert Atkyns 1681; Nicholas Raynton 1681–1685	Succeeded by Sir Charles Gerard, 3rd Bt; Ralph Hawtrey
Baronetage of England
New creation	Baronet (of Willesdon); 1661–1688	Succeeded by William Roberts
