= George Mainwaring =

George Mainwaring may refer to:

- Captain Mainwaring, fictional character in the television sitcom Dad's Army
- Sir George Mainwaring (MP, died 1628) (before 1551–1628), English politician
- George Mainwaring (MP, died 1695) (c. 1642–1695), English politician
- George Boulton Mainwaring (c. 1773–?), British member of parliament for Middlesex
