= George Cooke (died 1768) =

English barrister and politician

George Cooke (c.1705–1768) was an English barrister and politician.

== Life ==
He was the son of Sir George Cooke, a barrister who became chief prothonotary in the Court of Common Pleas, and his wife Anne, daughter of Edward Jennings, Member of Parliament for East Looe. He entered the Inner Temple in 1717, and was called to the bar in 1728.

Cooke was in practice as a barrister until his father died, in 1740. He had the life appointment as chief prothonotary, from 1732, and also inherited the family estate, Harefield in Middlesex.

In 1742 Cooke entered parliament, as member for Tregony, supported by Hugh Boscawen, 2nd Viscount Falmouth. At this stage, Horace Walpole called him "a pompous Jacobite". Leaving parliament in 1747, he was returned for Middlesex in 1750. Initially a Tory, he became a follower of William Pitt the elder in the later 1750s. In the 1760s he opposed the Stamp Act 1765. He was still the member for Middlesex when he died on 5 June 1768.

== Family ==
Cooke married Catherine, daughter of Sir Thomas Twisden, 4th Baronet, in 1735; they had seven sons. The heir was George John Cooke, who became a Lieutenant-General in the Army.

== Notes ==
Parliament of Great Britain
Preceded by Thomas Watts; Henry Penton	Member of Parliament for Tregony; 1742 – 1747; With: Henry Penton	Succeeded by Claudius Amyand; William Trevanion
Preceded by Sir Hugh Smithson, Bt; Sir William Beauchamp-Proctor, Bt	Member of Parliament for Middlesex; 1750 – 1768; With: Sir William Beauchamp-Proctor, Bt to March 1768; John Wilkes from March 1768	Succeeded by John Glynn; John Wilkes
