= John Suckling =

John Suckling may refer to:

- Sir John Suckling (politician) (1569–1627), of Roos Hall, Suffolk
- Sir John Suckling (poet) (1609–1642), English poet
