= Charles Gerard =

Charles Gerard may refer to:

- Charles Gerard, 1st Earl of Macclesfield (1618–1694)
- Charles Gerard, 2nd Earl of Macclesfield (1659–1701)
- Sir Charles Gerard (politician) (1657–by 1701), English member of parliament for Middlesex, and for Cockermouth
- Charles Gérard (1922–2019), actor in Édith et Marcel
