= Thomas Charlton (speaker) =

English politician (died 1465)

Thomas Charlton (1417?–1465) was an English politician who served as speaker for House of Commons of England in 1454.

== Biography ==
Possibly born 1417, Charlton was the son and heir of Sir Thomas Charlton of Hillingdon (d. 1445), land owner and MP.

By 1441, Thomas Jr. had entered Henry VI's household as one of the esquires of the hall and chamber. In 1442 he was elected to the first of six parliaments in which he served as knight of the shire for Middlesex. He inherited extensive estates from his parents in over five counties and again represented Middlesex in the Parliaments of 1447 and 1449-50. He was knighted around 1453. In 1453 he once again sat in parliament for Middlesex, when Richard, Duke of York made his claim to the throne during Henry VI's illness. The speaker for the House of Commons, Thomas Thorpe, was arrested on York's orders and on 16 February 1454. Charlton was elected in his place until April 1454.

In 1455, Thomas Charlton was appointed Sheriff of Bedfordshire and Buckinghamshire. In 1459, he returned to Parliament. After the Yorkist invasion of 1460, he committed to the Yorkist cause and was one of the judges who tried the Lancastrian defenders of the Tower of London, was again elected to Parliament and was made Comptroller of the Household. As Comptroller, he accompanied Henry VI to the second battle of St. Albans in 1461, where he was taken as prisoner, regaining his freedom after Edward IV's victory at Towton in the following month.

He died in 1465. He married Benedicta Vernon (Charlton), daughter of the former speaker of the Commons Sir Richard Vernon. They had two sons and three daughters.

Political offices
Preceded by Thomas Thorpe	Speaker of the House of Commons; 1454	Succeeded by John Wenlock
