= Francis Darcy =

English soldier and politician

Sir Francis Darcy (died 29 November 1641) was an English soldier and politician who sat in the House of Commons at various times between 1601 and 1629.

Darcy was the son of Sir Arthur Darcy. His grandfather Thomas, Lord Darcy was executed for treason in 1537. He became a captain in Colonel Morgan’s regiment under the Earl of Leicester and served in the Netherlands in 1585. In 1591 he served under the Earl of Essex at Rouen and was knighted at the siege of Rouen in that year. He settled at Isleworth in 1592 and became a J.P. by 1596 and a commissioner for musters in 1598, "being a gentleman of great experience in martial affairs". He was appointed a colonel of foot in the Earl of Essex’s Irish expedition in 1599. He became provost marshal of Middlesex in 1601. Also in 1601, he was elected Member of Parliament for Lymington. He was an ambassador to Denmark and also an equerry of the stable in 1603. In 1621 he was elected MP for Middlesex. He was elected MP for Middlesex again in 1628 and sat until 1629 when King Charles decided to rule without parliament and did so for eleven years.

Darcy died in 1641 and was buried with his wife at Isleworth, where an elaborate monument was erected.

Darcy married Katherine (or Elizabeth) Legh, daughter of Edward Legh of Rushall, Staffordshire in about 1591. They had three daughters. He was brother of Edward Darcy and Sir Henry Darcy.

Parliament of England
Preceded by Thomas West; Henry Wallop	Member of Parliament for Lymington; 1601; With: Thomas Ridley	Succeeded by Thomas Marshal; Thomas South
Preceded by Sir Julius Caesar; Sir Thomas Lake	Member of Parliament for Middlesex; 1621–1622; With: Sir Gilbert Gerard, Bt	Succeeded by Sir Gilbert Gerard, Bt; Sir John Suckling
Preceded by Sir Gilbert Gerard, Bt; Sir Edward Spencer	Member of Parliament for Middlesex; 1628–1629; With: Sir Henry Spiller	Parliament suspended until 1640
