= Middlesex election affair =

April 1769 Middlesex by-election
← March 1769	13 April 1769	1774 →

Middlesex constituency
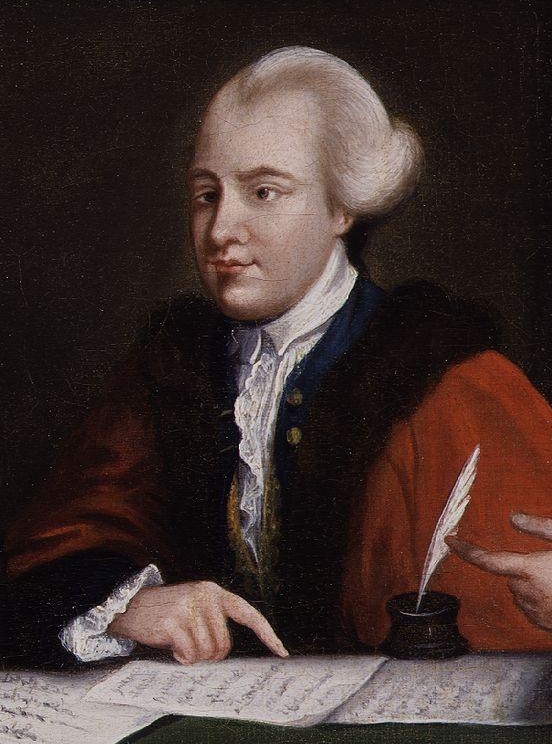

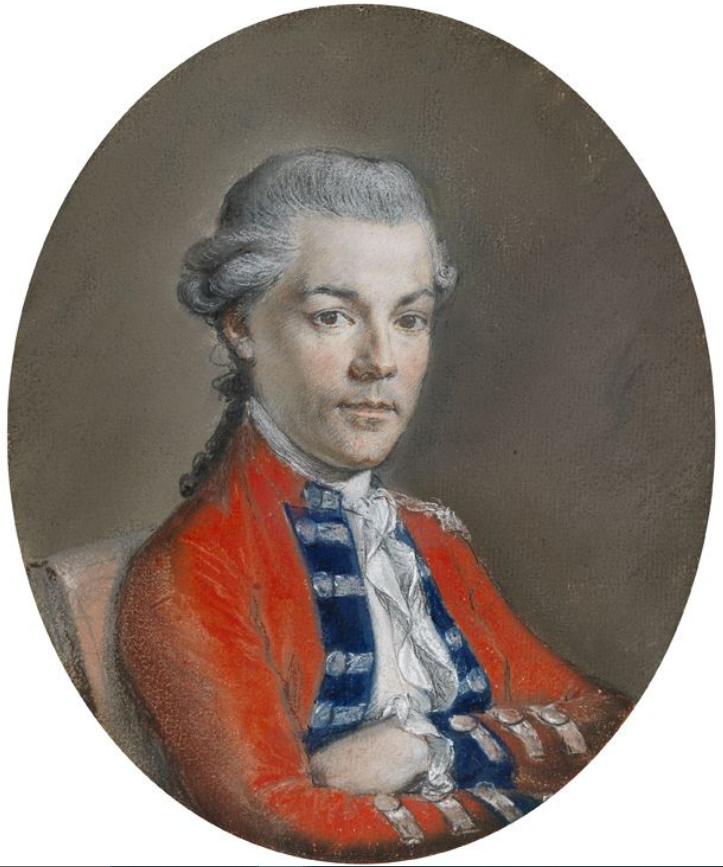
	First party	Second party
Candidate	John Wilkes	Henry Luttrell
Party	Radical	Tory
Popular vote	1,143	296
Percentage	79.2%	20.5%
MP before election
Vacant
Elected MP
John Wilkes
Radical

The Middlesex election affair was a political controversy in Great Britain concerning the election of a Member of Parliament for the constituency of Middlesex in 1769. After being expelled from Parliament in February 1769 following his election as MP for Middlesex in the 1768 general election, Radical journalist John Wilkes was repeatedly re-elected as MP for Middlesex in a series of three by-elections in February, March, and April 1769, with Parliament voiding each result. After the April by-election, the only one in which Wilkes's re-election had been contested, Parliament ordered the returns amended to transfer the seat to his defeated rival, Henry Luttrell. The events sparked a national controversy on Wilkes and the broader issue of democracy in Britain.

== By-elections of 1769 ==
Radical journalist John Wilkes was elected MP for Middlesex, in modern Greater London, on an anti-government platform in the 1768 general election, but he was expelled from Parliament on 3 February 1769 on the basis that he had been an outlaw at the time of his election. A by-election was consequently held in Middlesex on 16 February, which resulted in Wilkes's re-election unopposed. Parliament voided the result, taking the view that his previous conduct rendered him unfit for office. Wilkes was then re-elected unopposed a second time on 16 March.

The process was repeated, with Parliament voiding the March result and a third by-election being held on 13 April. This time, the government found a candidate to oppose Wilkes in the shape of Henry Luttrell, an Irish soldier who was a personal enemy of his. Two additional candidates also registered on this occasion: William Whitaker, a lawyer connected to the Rockingham Whigs, and David Roache, another Irishman. In the event, Wilkes defeated Luttrell by a margin of 1,143 votes to 296.

=== Table of results ===
February 1769 Middlesex by-election
Party	Candidate	Votes	%
Radical	John Wilkes	Unopposed	
Radical hold			

March 1769 Middlesex by-election
Party	Candidate	Votes	%
Radical	John Wilkes	Unopposed	
Radical hold			

April 1769 Middlesex by-election
Party	Candidate	Votes	%
Radical	John Wilkes	1,143	79.2
Tory	Henry Luttrell	296	20.5
Rockingham Whigs	William Whitaker	5	0.3
Independent	David Roache	0	0.0
Total votes		1,444	100.0
Majority		-847	-58.7
Tory gain from Radical			

=== Amendment of returns ===
Upon Wilkes's third re-election, the House of Commons voided the result on 14 April after a contentious debate, and by a majority of 221 to 139 the following day ordered the returns to be amended to show Luttrell the victor. On 29 April, a petition by the freeholders of Middlesex was presented to the House stating that Luttrell could not sit as their representative "without manifest infringement of [their] rights and privileges". In response, Parliament's decision was reaffirmed by a motion on 8 May. Supporters of the motion argued that it was the freeholders who were attempting an injury by imposing an unsuitable person on the House, and "that those who obstinately and wilfully persevere in voting for an unqualified person, are to be considered as not voting at all". A subsequent petition was addressed to King George III on 24 May.

== Aftermath and significance ==
Though Luttrell retained his seat for the next five years, the controversy raised Wilkes's political profile considerably. Edmund Burke, political philosopher and MP for Wendover at the time, described the affair as a "tragi-comedy acted by 'His Majesty's servants', at the desire of several 'persons of quality', for the benefit of Mr. Wilkes and at the expense of the Constitution". The Society of Gentlemen Supporters of the Bill of Rights was formed in February 1769 to support Wilkes after his first expulsion, and led a national petition campaign that garnered 60,000 signatures at a time when the total electorate numbered around 250,000. He was elected an alderman of the City of London, and then became Lord Mayor of London in 1774 before winning Middlesex again at the following general election that year. In 1782, the House of Commons expunged the orders and resolutions relating to the Middlesex affair from its records.

The Middlesex controversy helped to promote democratic ideals in Britain. Supporters of Wilkes adopted general demands that included the exclusion of placemen from the Commons, yearly or triennial parliaments, and fair and equal representation. Wilkes's election campaign in April saw popular demonstrations in London, including a procession along Pall Mall. His organisation also developed the tactic of asking for pledges from sympathetic Members of Parliament and coordinating their votes, a practice that sparked a debate on the role of Members of Parliament relative to their electors.
