= Henry Spiller =

English office-holder, landowner and politician

Sir Henry Spiller (c. 1570 – 16 April 1649) was an English office-holder, landowner and politician who sat in the House of Commons between 1614 and 1629. He supported the Royalist cause in the English Civil War.

== Biography ==
Spiller was born in about 1570, fifth son of John Spiller of Shaftesbury, Dorset. His only known education was as a law student at Lincoln's Inn in 1606, but he was already employed in government service as clerk to the Lord Treasurer's Remembrancer by 1594. He was later responsible for deriving income from recusants and his policies led to the sale of baronetcies from 1611. In 1612 James I granted him the manor of Laleham.

In 1614, Spiller was elected member of parliament for Arundel. He was knighted at Whitehall on 20 July 1618. He obtained the manor of Colquire in Cornwall in 1618 and was one of those granted the advowson of Esher in 1620.

He was re-elected MP for Arundel in 1621, 1624 and 1625. In 1628 he was elected MP for Thetford and Middlesex and chose to sit for Middlesex until 1629 when King Charles decided to rule without parliament for eleven years.

He sought re-election, to the Short Parliament of 1640, at Tewkesbury but was defeated by Sir Anthony Ashley Cooper (who was then a minor but was backed by the influence of Lord Coventry). Ashley Cooper called Spiller "a crafty, perverse, rich man" and "a great enemy to the town and the puritans".

In 1623 he had made a map of his estate at Laleham which has survived to this day.

== Family ==
Spiller was twice married. Firstly, by 1592, to Dorothy Dicons, by whom he had two sons and two daughters, who died in 1624. His subsequent second marriage was to a woman named Anne, of unknown family, but they had no children. Both wives were reported to be Roman Catholics.

In 1640 Spiller's wife, Lady Anne Spiller, was charged with recusancy and she was pronounced guilty on 5 May. Spiller supported the King in the Civil War as a commissioner. He was taken prisoner at Hereford where he had gone to convalesce, and incarcerated in the Tower of London. In 1646 he proposed to compound for his estates for £8,611 but the fine was unpaid when he died.

Spiller was the father of Robert Spiller, MP for Thetford; and Katherine who married Sir Thomas Reynell of Weybridge.

Parliament of England
Preceded by Thomas Preston; John Tye	Member of Parliament for Arundel; 1614–1625; With: Edward Morley 1614; Lionel Cranfield 1621–1622; Sir Richard Weston 1622; Sir George Chaworth 1624; William Mill 1625	Succeeded by Nicholas Jordain; William Mill
Preceded by Richard Lewknor; Samuel Owfield	Member of Parliament for Midhurst; 1626–1628; With: Richard Lewknor	Succeeded by Christopher Lewknor; Edward Savage
Preceded by Sir Gilbert Gerard, Bt; Sir Edward Spencer	Member of Parliament for Middlesex; 1628–1629; With: Sir Francis Darcy	Parliament suspended until 1640
