= Thomas Thorpe (speaker) =

English politician (died 1461)

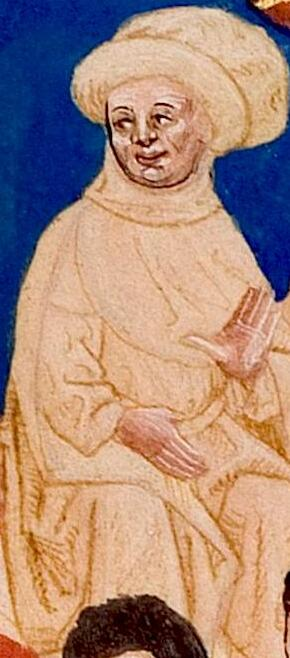
Depiction of a puisne Baron of the Exchequer contemporary to Thorpe's term in office

Sir Thomas Thorpe (died 1461) was Speaker of the House of Commons in England from 8 March 1453 until 16 February 1454.

He worked as a clerk in the royal Exchequer, reaching a position of Third Baron of the Exchequer in 1452. His parliamentary career began in October 1449 when he was elected junior knight of the shire (MP) of Northamptonshire with Thomas Tresham. He was later knight of the shire for Essex and was elected Speaker for the first part of the 19th Parliament of King Henry VI in 1453. In 1454 he was imprisoned in the Fleet Prison for falsely confiscating property of the Duke of York and was replaced as Speaker by Sir Thomas Charlton, the House of Commons having failed to secure his release.

In 1455 he became Chancellor of the Exchequer but his enemy the Duke of York accused him of intercepting messages to the King which might have prevented the Battle of St Albans and Thorpe was stripped of all his public offices. On his return to favour in 1457 he was made keeper of the privy wardrobe in the Tower of London for life and in 1458 was appointed Second Baron of the Exchequer, serving until 1460. At the parliament of 1459 he gained his revenge on the Duke of York by helping to draw up the bill of attainder declaring York and his leading followers to be traitors.

In 1460 he was captured after the Battle of Northampton and brought back to London as a prisoner and once more stripped of his offices. He escaped from prison, but was recaptured and sent to the Tower. He escaped a second time but on 17 February 1461 was caught in Harringay by a London mob and summarily beheaded.

He had married Joan and was succeeded by his son and heir Roger. Some sources may give the dates of his Speakership as being between 1452 and 1453 as, at the time, the new year did not begin in England until a date in March. The dates given above are on the basis of the year starting on 1 January.

Political offices
Preceded by William Oldhall	Speaker of the House of Commons; 1453–1454	Succeeded by Thomas Charlton
