= George Byng (1764–1847) =

British politician

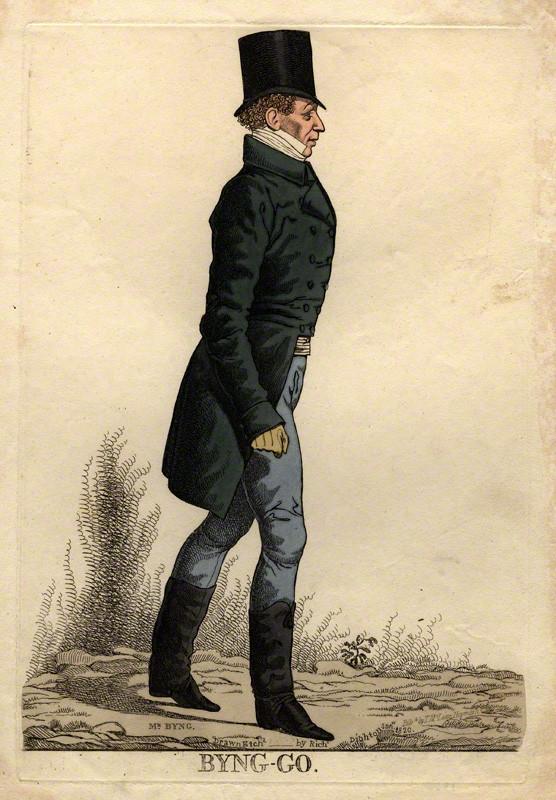
George Byng („Byng-Go" by Richard Dighton, 1820)

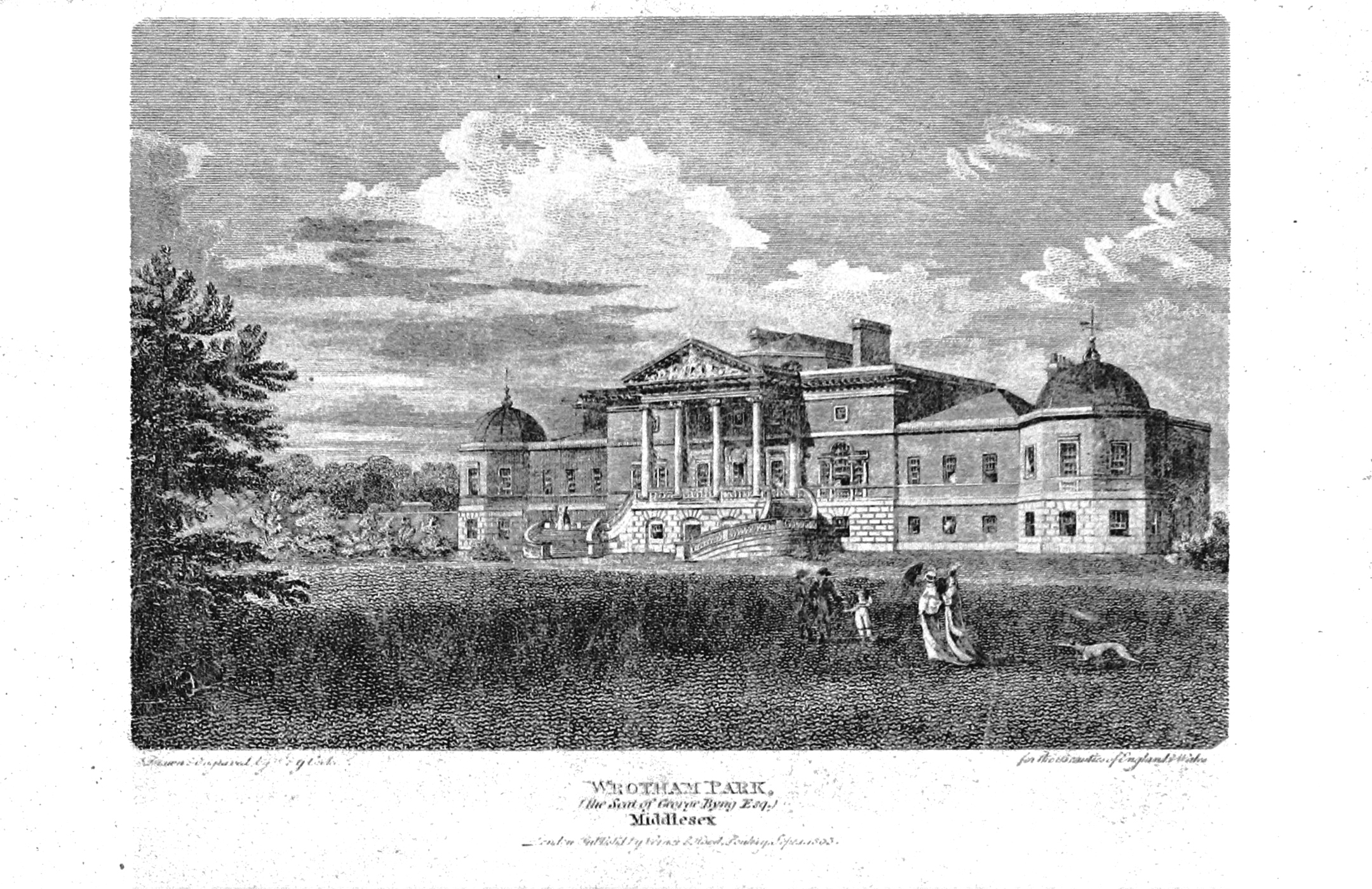
Wrotham Park in 1820

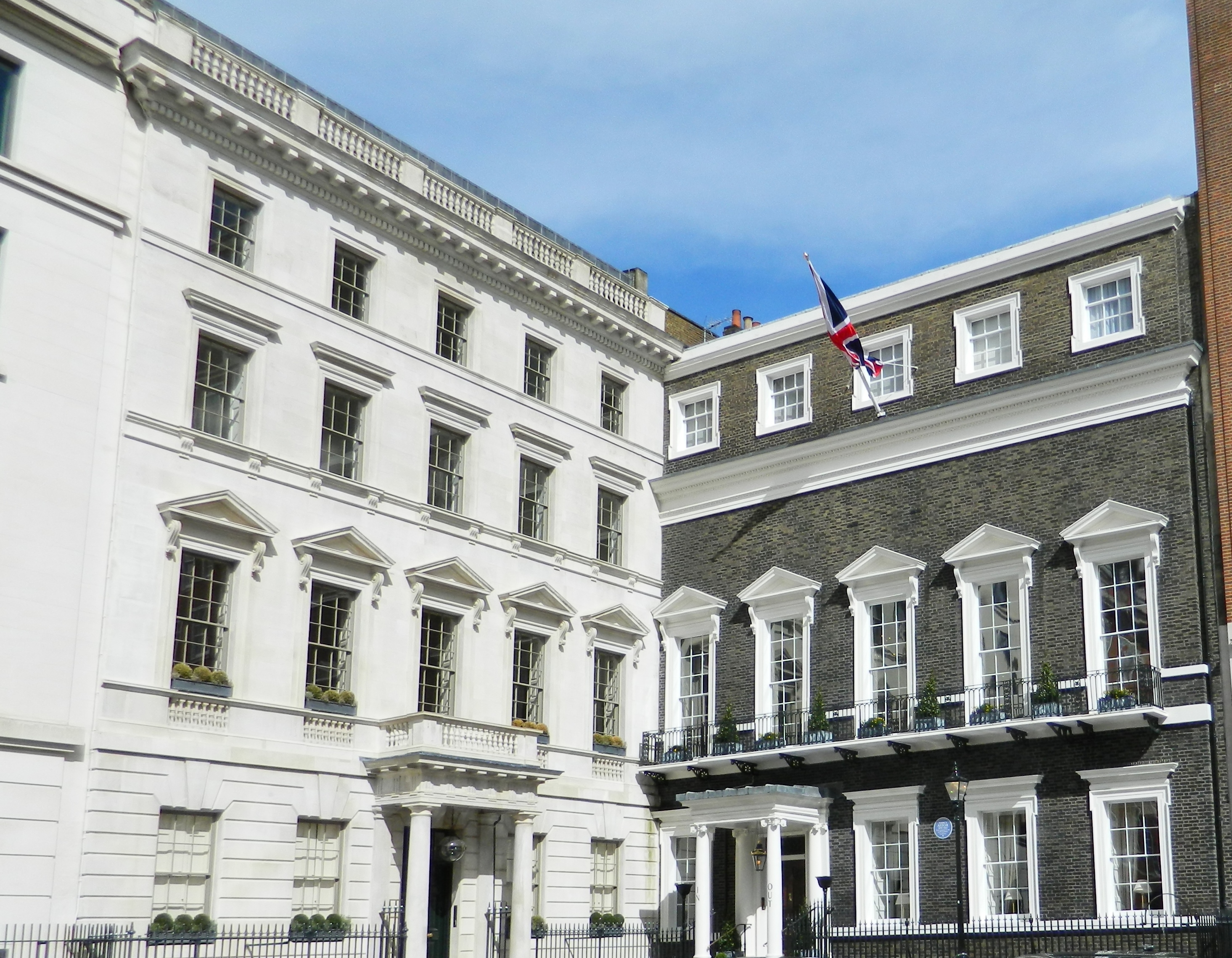
Left: Wentworth House, 5, St James's Square, London, townhouse built 1748-51 by William Wentworth, 2nd Earl of Strafford (1722–1791) to the design of Matthew Brettingham The Elder

George Byng DL JP (17 May 1764 – 10 January 1847), of Wrotham Park in Middlesex (now Hertfordshire), and of Wentworth House, 5, St James's Square, London, was a British Whig politician.

== Origins ==
He was the eldest son and heir of George Byng (1735–1789) (eldest son of Robert Byng (1703–1740), third son of Admiral George Byng, 1st Viscount Torrington (1663–1733)) of Wrotham Park, by his wife Anne Conolly, a daughter of William Conolly (d.1754), of Stratton Hall, Staffordshire and of Castletown, co. Kildare, a Member of Parliament. Anne's mother was Lady Anne Wentworth, a daughter of Thomas Wentworth, 1st Earl of Strafford (1672–1739). His younger brother was Field Marshal John Byng, 1st Earl of Strafford (1772–1860), elevated to the peerage in 1847 with the same territorial designation as the earldom of his maternal cousins, which earldom had become extinct in 1799.

== Career ==
He was educated at Göttingen University from 1780 where he studied under Georg Christoph Lichtenberg. Byng was returned to Parliament for Middlesex in 1790, a seat he held until his death 57 years later. During his early years he was an associate of Charles James Fox. Between 1832 and 1847 he was Father of the House of Commons. He was offered a peerage in order to increase the Whig majority in the House of Lords prior to the 1832 Reform Act, but refused. He was also a Deputy Lieutenant and Justice of the Peace for Middlesex.

== Marriage ==
In 1797 he married Harriet Montgomery, a daughter of Sir William Montgomery, 1st Baronet, of Macbie Hill, Peebles, but had no children.

== Death and succession ==
He died on 10 January 1847, aged 82. His heir was his younger brother, Field Marshal John Byng, 1st Earl of Strafford (1772–1860), elevated to the peerage in the same year.

Parliament of Great Britain
Preceded by John Wilkes; William Mainwaring	Member of Parliament for Middlesex; 1790–1801; With: William Mainwaring	Succeeded by Parliament of the United Kingdom
Parliament of the United Kingdom
Preceded by Parliament of Great Britain	Member of Parliament for Middlesex; 1801–1847; With: William Mainwaring 1801–1802; Sir Francis Burdett, Bt 1802–1804, 1805–1806; George Boulton Mainwaring 1804–1805, 1806; William Mellish 1806–1820; Samuel Charles Whitbread 1820–1830; Joseph Hume 1830–1837; Thomas Wood 1837–1847	Succeeded by Thomas Wood; Lord Robert Grosvenor
Preceded by Samuel Smith	Father of the House of Commons; 1832–1847	Succeeded by Charles Williams-Wynn
