= Edward Spencer (English politician) =

English politician (1594–1656)

Sir Edward Spencer (1594 – 16 February 1656) was an English landowner, lawyer, knight, nobleman, and politician who sat in the House of Commons at various times between 1621 and 1648.

== Life ==
Spencer was the son of Robert Spencer, 1st Baron Spencer of Wormleighton and his wife Margaret Willoughby the daughter of Sir Francis Willoughby of Wollaton Hall and Elizabeth Lyttelton. He was baptised at Brington on 2 March 1594. He matriculated at Corpus Christi College, Oxford on 13 November 1609, aged 14 and was awarded BA on 18 February 1612. In 1618 he was called to the bar at Lincoln's Inn.

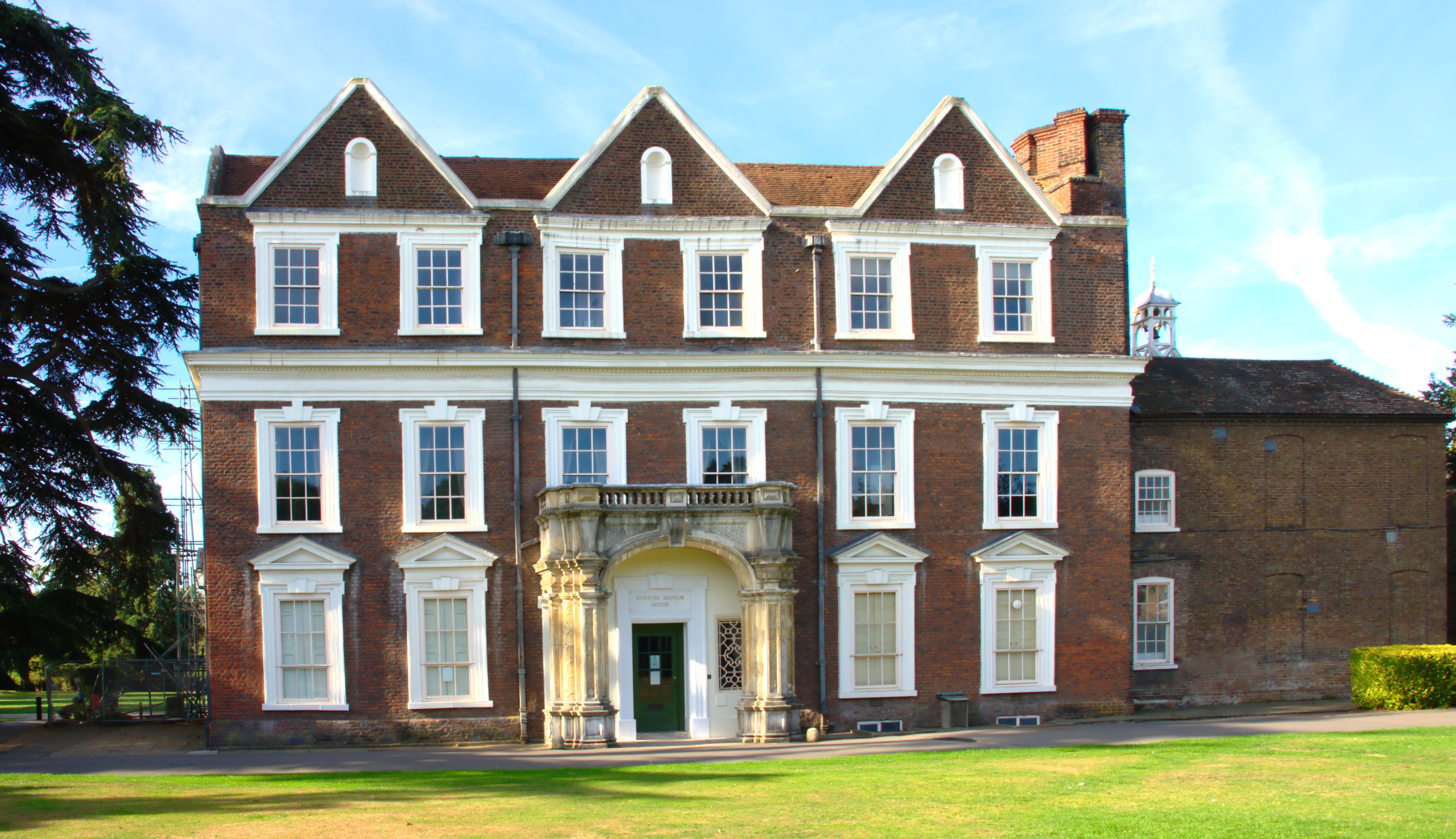
Boston Manor House

In 1621, Spencer was elected Member of Parliament for Brackley. He was re-elected MP for Brackley in 1624 and 1625. He was of Boston Manor when he was knighted at Hampton Court on 27 December 1625. In 1626 he was elected MP for Middlesex. He was re-elected MP for Middlesex in May 1648 as a recruiter to the Long Parliament, but was excluded under Pride's Purge in December.

Spencer died at the age of 61 and was buried at Great Brington, Northamptonshire.

== Family ==
Spencer married Lady Margaret Reade, widow of Sir William Reade of Osterley and daughter of John Goldsmith of Welby Suffolk. She was the builder of the Jacobean Boston Manor House in 1622. They had no children.

Parliament of England
Preceded by Sir William Spencer; Arthur Tyringham	Member of Parliament for Brackley; 1621–1625; With: Sir Thomas Wenman	Succeeded by Sir Thomas Wenman; John Crew
Preceded by Sir John Francklyn; Sir Gilbert Gerard, Bt	Member of Parliament for Middlesex; 1626; With: Sir Gilbert Gerard, Bt	Succeeded by Sir Francis Darcy; Sir Henry Spiller
Preceded by Sir John Francklyn; Sir Gilbert Gerard, Bt	Member of Parliament for Middlesex; 1648; With: Sir Gilbert Gerard, Bt	Succeeded by Not represented in Rump Parliament
