= 1878 Middlesex by-election =

UK Parliamentary by-election

A by-election was held in Middlesex on 12 April 1878, due to the incumbent Conservative MP, Lord George Hamilton, becoming vice-president of the Committee of the Council on Education. It was retained by the incumbent unopposed.
