= John Hughes (Middlesex MP) =

16th-century English politician

John Hughes (died 1543) was an English politician. He was a member of parliament (MP) for Middlesex from 1542 to 1543.
