= Edmund Bibbesworth =

English politician

Edmund Bibbesworth (died c. 1445) was an English politician. He sat as MP for Middlesex in December 1421.

He was the son and heir of Hugh Bibbesworh by his wife Amy. He married Goditha (died 1466) and they had five sons and three daughters. He was the owner of Finchley Manor, which was given to him in 1418 and left to his wife following his death.
