= Henry Somer =

English politician (c. 1370 – 1450)

Henry Somer (c.1370 – 23 March 1450) was a medieval English courtier and member of parliament who was Chancellor of the Exchequer. Somer's tenure as Chancellor occurred during the Great Bullion Famine and the beginning of the Great Slump in England.

== Public career ==
Somer, possibly born in Kent, moved to London as a young man to be a member of the court of King Richard II. In 1393 he was granted £5 per year as a royal servant. When Richard II was deposed by King Henry IV he kept his position and became one of the first non-ecclesiastical Clerks to the Treasurer. He was rewarded with a number of other offices such as Keeper of the Privy Wardrobe (1405–07), keeper of the royal park and custodian of the manor of Kempton (1409–12).

In 1408 he was made a Baron of the Exchequer and Deputy Treasurer to Sir John Tiptoft and then Sir John Pelham. In 1410 he exchanged the position for that of Chancellor of the Exchequer, which he held until 1437. Between 1411 and 1439 he also held the lucrative position of Keeper of the Exchange and Mint.

In 1406 he commenced a long political career by being elected to Parliament as the Member for Middlesex. He was subsequently re-elected four more times for the same seat in 1407, 1417, 1421 and 1429.

When Henry V ascended the throne in 1413 Somer was accused of misuse of public funds but after mounting a stout defence the charges against him were dropped. In 1422 he survived another change of monarch and finally retired in 1439, probably over 70 years of age.

He served as an MP for the last time as the member for Cambridgeshire in 1432.

== Private life ==
In 1402 he married Katherine, the widow and heiress of Mark Le Faire, a wealthy Winchester merchant and MP. He was a friend of both the poet Thomas Hoccleve and the writer Geoffrey Chaucer.

During his life he accumulated land in Edmonton and Tottenham in Middlesex and an estate in Grantchester, Cambridgeshire, enabling him to serve as a justice of the peace for both counties for many years. On his death in 1450 he was buried at St Johns, Cambridge and was succeeded by his grandson James.
