= Charles Gerard (politician) =

British politician (1653–1701)

Sir Charles Gerard

Member of Parliament for Middlesex
- In office 1685–1687
- Preceded by: Nicholas Raynton
- In office 1689–1695
- Succeeded by: Edward Russell

Member of Parliament for Cockermouth
- In office 1695–1698
- Preceded by: Sir Orlando Gee
- Succeeded by: George Fletcher

Personal details
- Born: 16 August 1653
- Died: Harrow
- Spouse: Honora Seymour (m. 1676)
- Parent: Sir Francis Gerard, 2nd Baronet (father)
- Relatives: Charles Seymour, 2nd Baron Seymour of Trowbridge (father-in-law)

Sir Charles Gerard, 3rd Baronet was an Tory Politician who served as MP for Middlesex from 1685 to 1687 in the Loyal Parliament and from 1689 to 1695 in the Convention and 2nd Parliament of William and Mary, then as MP for Cockermouth in the 3rd Parliament of William III from 1695 to 1698.

He died in Harrow in 1701.
