= William Norton (MP for Middlesex) =

English Member of Parliament

William Norton (fl. 1391), of Westminster, Middlesex, was an English Member of Parliament (MP).

He was a Member of the Parliament of England for Middlesex in 1391.
