= George Byng (1735–1789) =

British politician

Arms of Byng: Quarterly sable and argent in the first quarter a lion rampant of the second

George Byng (1735 – 27 October 1789) of Wrotham Park in Middlesex (now in Hertfordshire), was a British politician who sat in the House of Commons from 1768 to 1784.

== Origins ==
He was the eldest son of Robert Byng (1703-1740), Governor of Barbados, by his wife Elizabeth Forward, a daughter and co-heiress of Jonathan Forward. He was a grandson of Admiral George Byng, 1st Viscount Torrington (1663-1733) of Southill Park in Bedfordshire.

== Career ==
He inherited the estate of Wrotham Park from his unmarried and childless uncle Admiral John Byng (1704-1757), famously court-martialled and shot in 1757 following the fall of Minorca. At the 1768 general election Byng was elected as a Member of Parliament for Wigan. He was returned unopposed for Wigan in 1774. He was returned unopposed as MP for Middlesex at the 1780 general election but was defeated in a contest in 1784.

== Marriage and progeny ==
On 5 March 1761 Byng married Anne Conolly (died 1806), daughter of William James Conolly (d.1754) by his wife Lady Anne Wentworth, a daughter of Thomas Wentworth, 1st Earl of Strafford (1672–1739). William James Conolly was an Irish Member of Parliament and was the nephew and heir of William Conolly (1662-1729), of Castletown House, County Kildare, Speaker of the Irish House of Commons, reputed to be the wealthiest man in Ireland. By his wife he had progeny including:

- George Byng (1764–1847), eldest son and heir, MP, of Wrotham Park and of Wentworth House, 5, St James's Square, London, built in 1748-51 by his maternal relative William Wentworth, 2nd Earl of Strafford (1722–1791). He married but left no children.
- Field Marshal John Byng, 1st Earl of Strafford (1772-1860), 2nd son and heir to his childless brother.

== Death ==
He died on 27 October 1789.

Parliament of Great Britain
Preceded by Fletcher Norton; Simon Luttrell	Member of Parliament for Wigan; 1768–1774; With: Beaumont Hotham 1768-1775; John Morton 1775-1780; Henry Simpson Bridgeman 1780	Succeeded by Hon. Horatio Walpole; Henry Simpson Bridgeman
Preceded by John Wilkes; Thomas Wood	Member of Parliament for Middlesex; 1780–1784; With: John Wilkes	Succeeded by John Wilkes; William Mainwaring
