= William Barnville =

English politician

William Barnville (fl. 1381–1400) was an English politician. He sat as MP for Middlesex in May 1382 and September 1388.

== Political career ==
He also served as commissioner of inquiry concerning tresspasses at Harrow and Pinner in Middlesex in August 1381; commissioner to suppress the insurgents of 1381 in December 1381, and in March and December 1382.

== Family ==
He was the son of John Barnville by Margaret, the daughter of Thomas Fryville. By October 1382, he was married to Avice. He married his second wife Maud and had at least one son.
