= William Mainwaring (English politician) =

18th/19th-century English politician

Chairman of the Middlesex Quarter Sessions
- In office 1781–1816
- Preceded by: John Hawkins
- Succeeded by: John Scott Lillie

Member of Parliament for Middlesex
- In office 22 April 1784 – 13 July 1802
- Preceded by: George Byng; John Wilkes
- Succeeded by: George Byng; Francis Burdett

Personal details
- Born: 6 October 1735
- Died: 28 February 1821 (aged 85)
- Children: George Boulton Mainwaring

William Mainwaring (6 October 1735 – 28 February 1821) was the MP for Middlesex from 1784 and chairman of the Middlesex and Westminster Quarter Sessions for a similar period.

He was the eldest son of Boulton Mainwaring of Isleworth, Middlesex and educated at Merchant Taylors' School (1744–52). He then entered Lincoln's Inn in 1754 to study law and was called to the bar in 1759.

He was elected to serve as MP for Middlesex from 1784 to 1802. In the 1802 General election, he stood as candidate for Middlesex again was opposed by the radical Francis Burdett. Mainwaring had previously resisted Burdett's calls for an inquiry into prison abuses, particularly at Coldbath Fields Prison. Mainwaring was defeated by Burdett but the election was declared void in 1804 and in the following contest William's son George Boulton Mainwaring was elected. The result was reversed in favour of Burdett in 1805 and the back in favour of Mainwaring Junior in 1806. Mainwaring did not contest the 1807 election and Burdett was not elected.

He died in 1821, leaving one son, George Boulton Mainwaring.

Parliament of Great Britain
Preceded by George Byng; John Wilkes	Member of Parliament for Middlesex; 1784 – 1800; With: John Wilkes to 1790; George Byng from 1790	Succeeded by Parliament of the United Kingdom
Parliament of the United Kingdom
Preceded by Parliament of Great Britain	Member of Parliament for Middlesex; 1801 – 1802; With: George Byng	Succeeded by Sir Francis Burdett, Bt; George Byng
