= George Boulton Mainwaring =

George Boulton Mainwaring was a Tory MP for Middlesex, a position that had also been held by his father William Mainwaring.

Mainwaring is thought to have been born in 1773. He was the son of William Mainwaring.

In the 1802 general election, William was opposed by the radical Francis Burdett. William had previously resisted Burdett's calls for an inquiry into Prison abuses, particularly at Coldbath Fields Prison. William was defeated by Burdett but the election was declared void in 1804 and, in the following contest, George was elected. The result was reversed in favour of Burdett in 1805 and then back in favour of George in 1806. Mainwaring did not contest the 1807 election and Burdett was not elected. The National Portrait Gallery has a caricature which includes Mainwaring that pokes fun at the 1804 election.

On 9 June 1804, Mainwaring married Letitia Wodehouse.

Parliament of the United Kingdom
Preceded by Sir Francis Burdett, Bt; George Byng	Member of Parliament for Middlesex; 1804–1805; With: George Byng	Succeeded by Sir Francis Burdett, Bt; George Byng
Preceded by Sir Francis Burdett, Bt; George Byng	Member of Parliament for Middlesex; 1806; With: George Byng	Succeeded by William Mellish; George Byng
