= John Suckling (politician) =

English politician (1569–1627)

Sir John Suckling (1569 – 27 March 1627) was an English politician who sat in the House of Commons at various times between 1601 and 1627.

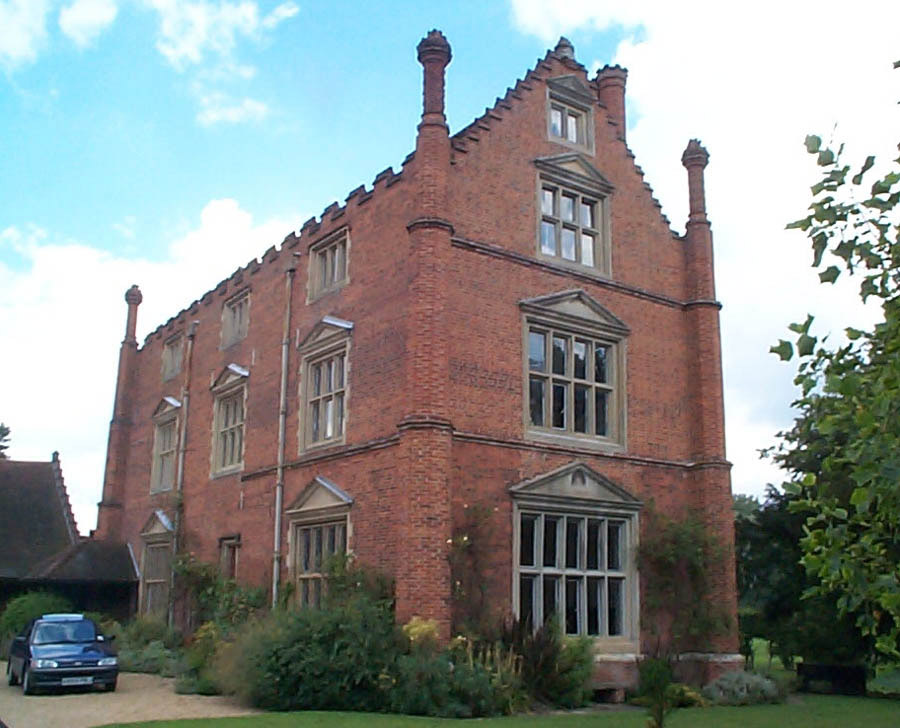
Roos hall, Suffolk - bought by Suckling in 1600

Suckling was the son of Robert Suckling, mayor of Norwich and MP for the city's constituency between 1571-1572 and 1586-1588, and his wife Elizabeth Barwick, daughter of William Barwick. He entered Gray's Inn on 22 May 1590. He was elected Member of Parliament for Dunwich in 1601.

In 1602, he was acting as secretary to the Lord High Treasurer, Sir Robert Cecil, and in December 1604 he became receiver of fines on alienations, in succession to Sir Arthur Aty. In 1614 he was elected MP for Reigate. He was knighted by James I at Theobalds on 22 January 1616. In February 1619 he became a Master of Requests, and, in 1622, he was appointed comptroller of the royal household, "paying well for the post." Suckling had become wealthy and accumulated manors, fee-farms, and advowsons in various parts of the country.

In September 1621, he was mentioned as Sir Richard Weston's most serious competitor for the chancellorship of the exchequer and in March 1622 he was promoted to be secretary of state. Charles I, upon his accession three years later, created him a privy councillor.

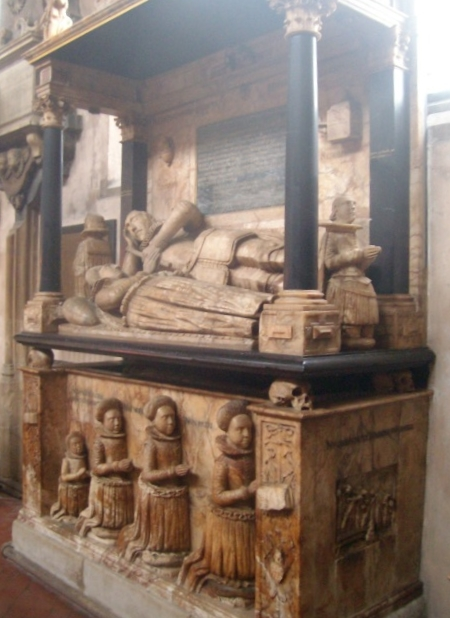
Alabaster monument (circa 1611) to Sir John Suckling (politician)

In 1624, he was elected MP for Middlesex, Lichfield and Kingston upon Hull and chose to sit for Middlesex. In 1625, he represented Yarmouth (IoW) after Edward Clarke opted to sit for Hythe. In 1626 he was elected MP for Norwich and for Sandwich; he chose to sit for Norwich.

== Marriages ==
Suckling married Martha Cranfield, daughter of Thomas Cranfield of London, and sister of Lionel Cranfield, 1st Earl of Middlesex. She died on 28 October 1613, aged 35. By her, he was the father of the poet Sir John Suckling. A monument of Sir John Suckling, his first wife, Martha, and family, can be seen in St Andrew's Church, Norwich.

On 2 March 1616, Suckling married Jane Hawkins, widow of Charles Hawkins and originally of the Suffolk family of Reve or Reeve. Suckling's widow took as her third husband Sir Edwin Rich, of Mulbarton, Norfolk and on the default of her stepson carried into that family the estate of Roos Hall near Beccles Suffolk which Suckling had acquired in 1600 as his residence. On Suckling's death, Roos Hall had been inherited by Sir Alexander Temple (Suckling's brother-in-law) in lieu of repayment of a debt, but was later repurchased by the family.

Parliament of England
Preceded by Arthur Atye; Clipsby Gawdy	Member of Parliament for Dunwich; 1601–1604; With: Francis Myngate	Succeeded by Thomas Smythe; Philip Gawdy
Preceded by Sir Edward Howard; Herbert Pelham	Member of Parliament for Reigate; 1614–1621; With: Sir Edward Howard	Succeeded by Thomas Glemham; Robert Lewis
Preceded by Sir Francis Darcy; Sir Gilbert Gerard, Bt	Member of Parliament for Middlesex; 1624–1625; With: Sir Gilbert Gerard, Bt	Succeeded by Sir John Franklyn; Sir Gilbert Gerard, Bt
Preceded by Thomas Risley; William Beeston	Member of Parliament for Yarmouth (IoW); 1625–1626; With: John Oglander	Succeeded by Sir Edward Conway; Sir John Oglander
Preceded by William Denny; Sir Thomas Hyrne	Member of Parliament for Norwich; 1626–1627; With: Sir Thomas Hyrne	Succeeded by Sir Peter Gleane; Robert Debney
