= Robert Culling Hanbury =

British politician (1823–1867)

Robert Hanbury

Member of Parliament for Middlesex
- In office 29 April 1857 – 29 March 1867 Serving with George Byng (September 1857–1867); Robert Grosvenor (April 1857–September 1857)
- Preceded by: Robert Grosvenor; Ralph Bernal Osborne
- Succeeded by: George Byng; Henry Labouchère

Personal details
- Born: Robert Hanbury; 19 March 1823 St. Mary Spital Square Church, Tower Hamlets, London, England
- Died: 29 March 1867 (aged 44) St George Hanover Square, London, England
- Party: Liberal
- Other political affiliations: Whig
- Spouses: Caroline Smith (m. 1849; died 1863) Frances Selina Eardley (m. 1865)
- Children: Six

Robert Culling Hanbury (19 March 1823 – 29 March 1867) was a British Liberal and Whig politician.

Born at St Mary Spital Square Church in Tower Hamlets, London, Hanbury was the son of Robert Hanbury and Emily Willett Hall. In 1849, he married Caroline, daughter of Abel Smith and Frances Anne née Calvert, and they had at least five children: Edmund Smith (1850–1913); Evan (born 1854); Emily (born 1855); Mabel (1859–1941); and Caroline Rachel (1862–1949). After Caroline's death in 1863, he remarried to Frances Selina Eardley, daughter of Culling Eardley and Isabella née Carr in 1865. He also had one other child, Anthony Ashley Hanbury, who died in 1914.

Hanbury was first elected Whig MP for Middlesex at the 1857 general election and, becoming a Liberal in 1859, held the seat until his death in 1867.

Outside of politics, Hanbury was a partner in East London brewery Truman, Hanbury, Buxton & Company.

Parliament of the United Kingdom
Preceded by Robert Grosvenor; Ralph Bernal Osborne	Member of Parliament for Middlesex; 1857–1867; With: George Byng (September 1857–1867); Robert Grosvenor (April 1857–September 1857)	Succeeded by George Byng; Henry Labouchère
