= William Roberts (Parliamentarian) =

English Member of Parliament

Sir William Roberts (1605–1662), of Neasden House at Willesden in Middlesex, was an English Member of Parliament.

He entered Gray's Inn in 1622, and was knighted in 1624. At the outbreak of the English Civil War he took the Parliamentary side, and was one of the commissioners named to try the king, although he did not take part in the trial. He became a member of the Council of State in 1653, was elected represent Middlesex in the parliaments of 1654 and 1656, and in 1658 was raised to Cromwell's new House of Peers.

In 1646, Roberts had become became one of the contractors to sell church lands, and in 1651 he bought the prebends of Neasden, Oxgate, Harlesden and Chambers and the estate of Westminster Abbey. He had also augmented his estate by his marriage to Eleanor, daughter and heir of Robert Atye, with land in Hampstead and Kilburn. He retained his property after the Restoration, taking leases of the prebends when they reverted to the prebendaries, and leaving a significant fortune on his death.

Some sources mistakenly claim that after the Restoration, Roberts was created a baronet; in fact it was his son, also named William, who was made a baronet (in his father's lifetime), on 4 October 1661.
