= Sir Gilbert Gerard, 1st Baronet of Harrow on the Hill =

English politician

Sir Gilbert Gerard, 1st Baronet of Harrow on the Hill (23 October 1587 – 6 January 1670) was an English politician who sat in the House of Commons at various times between 1614 and 1660. He was a supporter of the Parliamentary cause during the English Civil War and of Oliver Cromwell during the Protectorate.

== Biography ==
Gerard was the son of William Gerard (died 1609) of Flambards, Harrow-on-the-Hill and his wife Dorothy Ratcliff, daughter of John Ratcliff of Langley. He succeeded his father in 1609, inheriting Flambards in Harrow .

Gilbert served as Clerk of the Council of the Duchy of Lancaster from 1609 to 1640. He was elected Member of Parliament for Wigan in 1614 and created a baronet in 1620. In 1621 he was elected MP for Middlesex. In 1624, he was elected MP for both Middlesex and Newtown, Isle of Wight but chose to sit for Middlesex. He was elected again for Middlesex in 1625 and 1626. In 1626, he was also appointed High Sheriff of Buckinghamshire.

In April 1640, Gerard was elected MP for Middlesex for the Short Parliament and in November the same year for the Long Parliament. He showed himself to be an enemy to the Earl of Strafford, and afterwards joined the Parliamentary cause against the King. He was appointed Colonel of the Middlesex Trained Bands and to the Committee of Both Kingdoms, and he was made paymaster of the Parliamentary army. He had three-pence in the pound allowance, worth fifty thousand pounds and also was appointed Chancellor of the Duchy of Lancaster. The Lord Protector Oliver Cromwell made him a lord of his Upper House.

After Richard Cromwell's resignation as Protector Gerard was refused admission to the House of Commons because of his alliance to and friendship for the Cromwells. He had the courage to bring an action against Colonel Alured, who had personally stopped him as he was entering the House; but Parliament ordered the action to be dropped, as it was done by their order. The Army soon after obtaining the superiority, he was nominated one of the new Council of State. In April 1660, he was elected MP for Lancaster. He survived the restoration, dying on 6 January 1670, and was buried at Harrow.

== Family ==
In 1614 Gerard married Mary, a daughter of Sir Francis Barrington and Joan Cromwell, and a cousin of Oliver Cromwell. He thereby acquired that year the manor of Aston Clinton in Buckinghamshire.

== Notes ==
Parliament of England
Preceded by Sir William Cooke; Sir John Pulteney	Member of Parliament for Wigan; 1614–1621; With: Richard Molyneux, 1st Viscount Molyneux	Succeeded by Sir Thomas Gerard, 1st Baronet; Roger Downes
Preceded by Sir Julius Caesar; Sir Thomas Lake	Member of Parliament for Middlesex; 1621–1626; With: Sir Francis Darcy 1621–1622; Sir John Suckling 1624; Sir John Francklyn 1625; Sir Edward Spencer 1626	Succeeded by Sir Francis Darcy; Sir Henry Spiller
Parliament suspended since 1629	Member of Parliament for Middlesex; 1640–1648; With: Sir John Francklyn 1640; Sir Edward Spencer 1640–1648	Not represented in Rump Parliament
Preceded by Thomas Fell	Member of Parliament for Lancaster; 1660–1661; With: William West	Succeeded by Richard Kirkby; Sir John Harrison
Baronetage of England
New creation	Baronet (of Harrow on the Hill); 1620–1670	Succeeded by Francis Gerard
