= Edmund Harvey =

English soldier and member of Parliament

Edmund Harvey or Hervey (c.1601–1673) was an English soldier and member of Parliament during the English Civil War, who sat as a commissioner at the Trial of King Charles I and helped to draw up the final charge. Although present on 27 January 1649 when the death warrant was signed he did not add his signature.

== Life ==
He was born the son of Charles Harvey, a London merchant, and his wife Alice. He followed his father into trade, being apprenticed in 1619 and becoming a silk merchant and freeman of the Drapers' Company in 1627.

When the Civil War broke out he enlisted as a Parliamentarian and was commissioned a Colonel of horse and fought at the siege of Gloucester and in the north. He then refused to obey orders to join up with the rest of the army until he was paid, and was instead discharged. He acquired property in Suffolk, where he was a deputy lieutenant in 1643, receiver-general for the county in 1644, and a keen member of the parliamentary committee from 1643 to 1645. In 1646 he was elected MP for Great Bedwyn, Wiltshire. When the pro-Royalist Presbyterian mobs seized Westminster in the summer of 1647, he did not join the pro-Army Independents in fleeing to asylum with the army. He was one of the very few who actually changed sides and supported the army against the king at Pride's Purge, as most Presbyterians opposed this action as well as the trial of the king. In 1654 he was MP for Middlesex. In 1655 he was placed under arrest for misappropriation of Army funds, fined and stripped of public office.

At the Restoration he was denied amnesty under the Act of Indemnity and Oblivion and was tried as a regicide. In 1661 he was found guilty, but instead of a capital punishment his assets were seized and he was imprisoned in Pendennis Castle in Cornwall. He died there in June 1673 and was buried in Falmouth parish churchyard. He had married twice; firstly Elizabeth, daughter of Samuel Gott of London with whom he had at least three sons and secondly Judith, daughter of George Langham of London and widow of Thomas Bales of London, with whom he had at least ten children before her death in September 1668.

== References and notes ==
- Ivan Roots &, S.M.Wynne. "Harvey, Edmund (c.1601–1673), regicide". Oxford Dictionary of National Biography (online ed.). Oxford University Press. doi:10.1093/ref:odnb/12513. (Subscription, Wikipedia Library access or UK public library membership required.)
