= Sir William Beauchamp-Proctor, 1st Baronet =

English politician

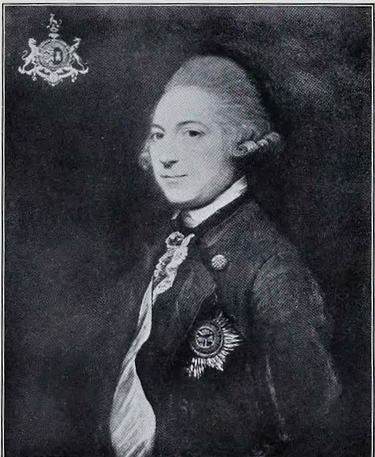
- Born: 1722
- Baptised: 11 May 1722
- Died: 13 September 1773 (aged 50–51)
- Alma mater: Magdalen College
- Occupation: Politician
- Spouse(s): Jane Tower, Laetitia Johnson

Sir William Beauchamp-Proctor, 1st Baronet (1722–1773) was an English politician. He served as a member of Parliament from Middlesex from 1747 to 1768. He was the first of the Proctor-Beauchamp baronets.

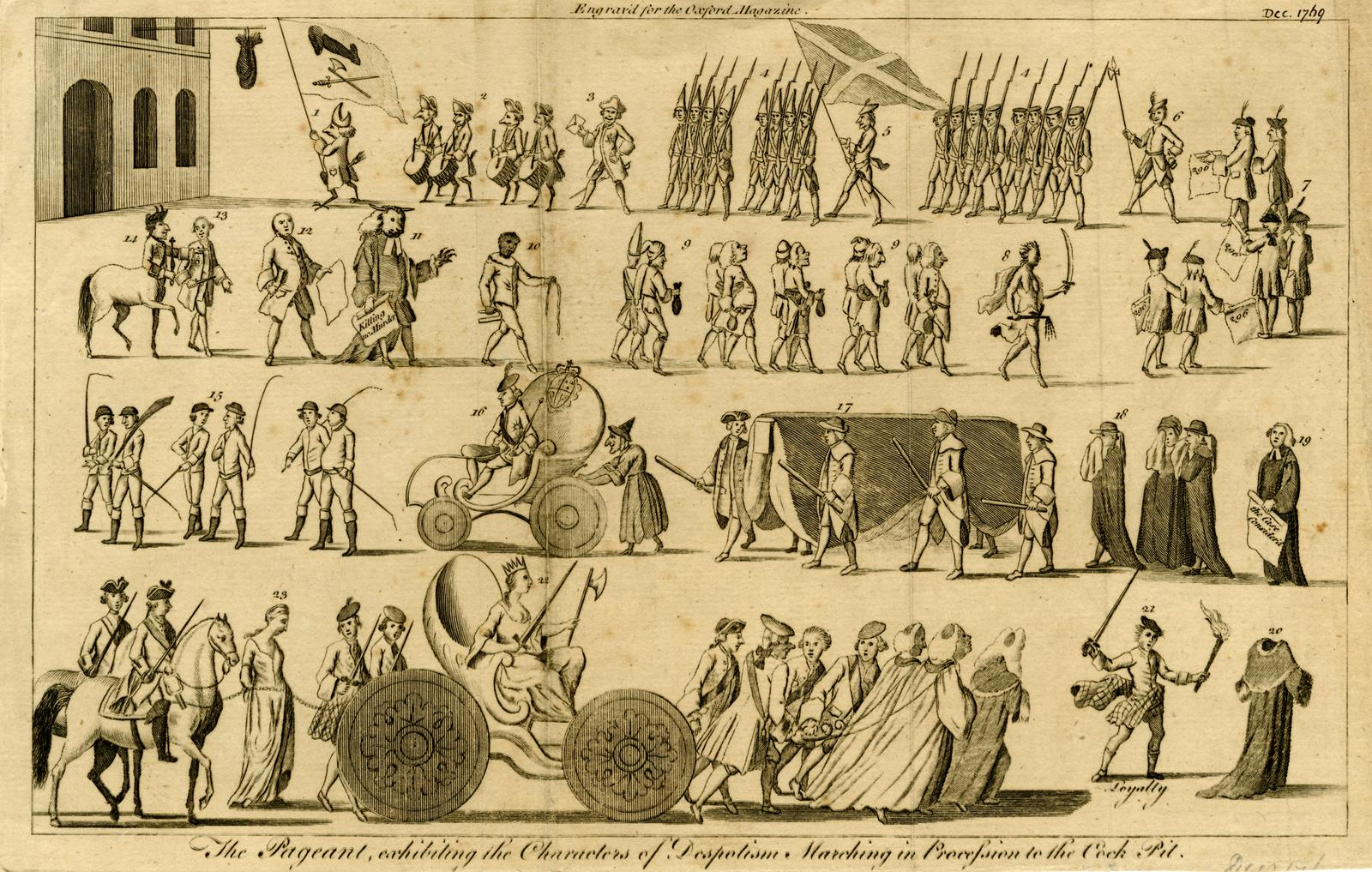
A political cartoon entitled "The Pageant, exhibiting the Characters of Despotism...", The Oxford Magazine, 1769; figure #18 is identified as "Sir W. B. P., Chief Mourner"

== Personal life ==
He was born William Beauchamp, the oldest son of Thomas Beauchamp (died 1724) and Anne Proctor, in Tottenham. He was educated at Magdalen College, Oxford. Around 1744–5 he inherited Langley Hall from his maternal uncle George Proctor and assumed the name "Beauchamp-Proctor" in accordance with his uncle's will. He married his cousin Jane Tower (1724–1761) in 1746; they had at least five children: Anne Proctor Bacon (1749–1813), Sir Thomas Beauchamp-Proctor, 2nd Bt. (1756–1826), Frances Proctor Constance (born 1757), George Proctor (born 1759), and Mary Proctor (died 1755). After his first wife's death, he married Laeticia Johnson on 13 May 1762 and they had at least five additional children: Letitia (1763–1780), Henrietta (1764, died an infant), William Henry (1769–1806), Christopher (born 1771), and Sidney (1774, died young). Laeticia Johnson's sister and co-heiress Agneta married, also in 1762, Charles Yorke, then Attorney-General.

As of 1753, Beauchamp-Proctor is listed as a vice president of the London Smallpox Hospital; by 1760 he is listed as vice president and governor for life. In 1760 he is listed as a vice president and governor of St Luke's Hospital for Lunatics. In 1772 he was listed as a vice president and governor of the "Lying-in Charity for Delivering Poor Married Women at Their Own Habitations", a charity of which the Prince of Wales George IV was the honorary president.

A painting by John Wootton shows Beauchamp-Proctor with others with Langley Hall in the distance.

He died on 13 September 1773 at Langley Hall and was buried in Tottenham.

=== Political career ===
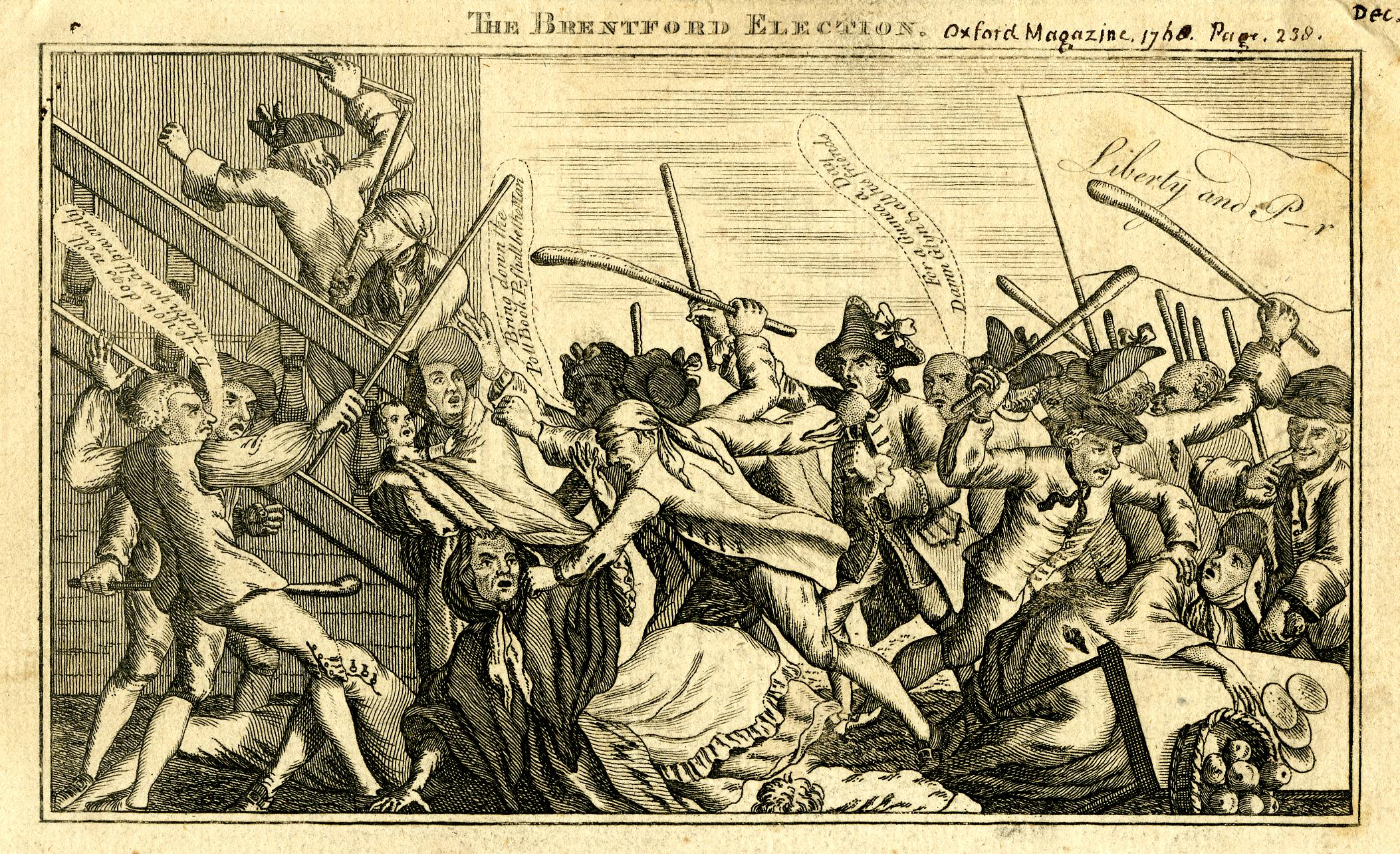
Proctor supporters attack the hustings in Brentford, December 1768

Beauchamp-Proctor was created a baronet on 20 February 1745. In 1747, he won election to Parliament and was re-elected without opposition in 1754. He was listed in 1754 as a supporter of the Whig administration. In 1761 he was listed as a supporter of Tory Lord Bute. He was made a Knight of the Bath 23 March 1761. Rockingham considered him a Whig in 1766. He was defeated at the 1768 British general election by radical John Wilkes and again in a by-election in December 1768 by Wilkes' lawyer John Glynn. The by-election reputedly cost Beauchamp-Proctor ten thousand pounds and was marred by violence and riots.
