= Lancelot Lake =

17th Century Lawyer in England

Sir Lancelot Lake (1609–1680) was an English lawyer, landowner and politician who sat in the House of Commons from 1660 to 1679.

Lake was the son of Sir Thomas Lake of Canons, Little Stanmore and his wife Mary Ryder, daughter of Sir William Ryder. His father was Secretary of State under James I. He was baptised on 10 February 1609. He was admitted at Hart Hall, Oxford in 1622 and was awarded BA in 1625. He entered Lincoln's Inn in 1626 and was called to the bar in 1633. In 1649 he became an associate bencher. He succeeded to the family estates on the death of his brother Thomas in 1653. In 1656 he settled 20 acres of land at Stanmore marsh on trustees, for them to pay £15 p.a. to a schoolmaster at Stanmore.

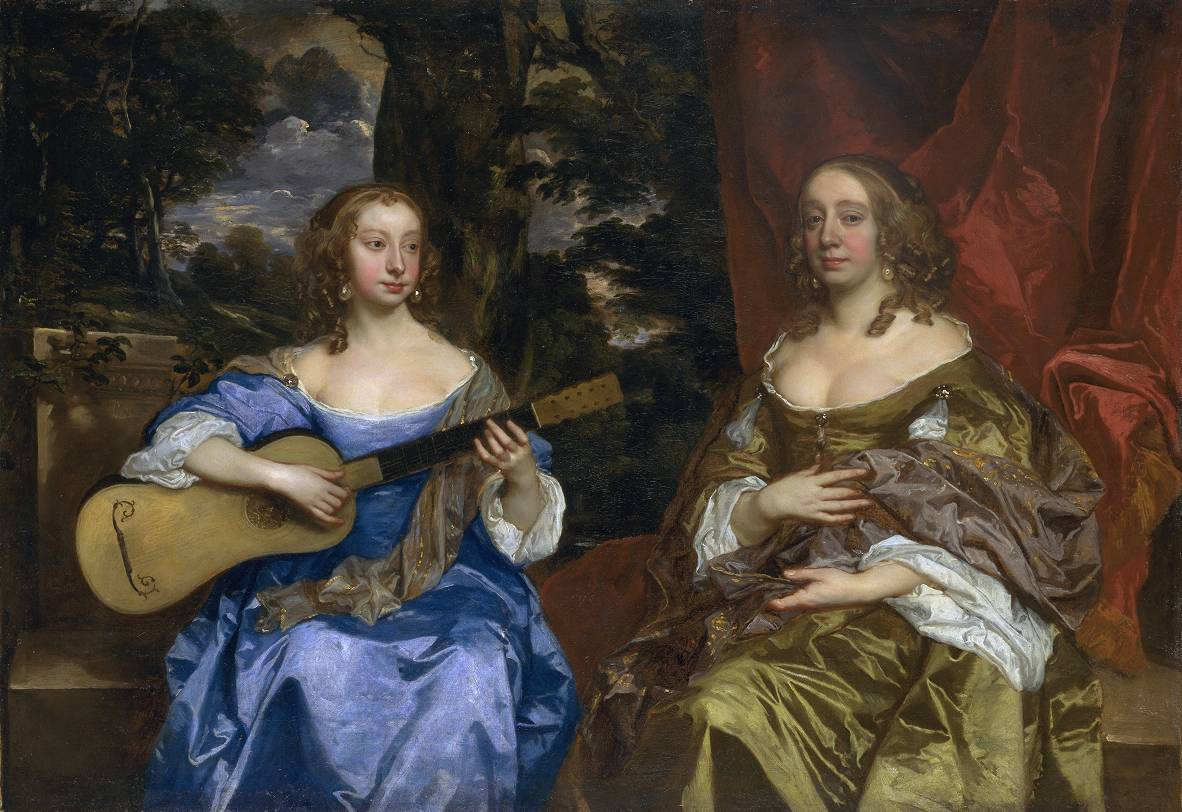
Two Ladies of the Lake Family by Sir Peter Lely

In 1660, Lake was elected Member of Parliament for Middlesex in the Convention Parliament. He was knighted at Whitehall on 6 June 1660. In 1661 he was re-elected MP for Middlesex in the Cavalier Parliament, and sat until 1679.

Lake died at the age of 71 and was buried at Little Stanmore on 4 May 1680. In his will, he stipulated that a schoolhouse which he had built at Stanmore should also be settled on trustees.

Lake married Frances Cheek, daughter of Sir Thomas Cheek and had six sons and two daughters, including Elizabeth, who married her Irish cousin Sir Thomas Domvile, of the Domvile Baronets of Templeogue. Lancelot's son Warwick Lake was later MP for Middlesex.
