= Sir Francis Gerard, 2nd Baronet =

English politician

Sir Francis Gerard, 2nd Baronet (12 October 1617 – December 1680) was an English politician who sat in the House of Commons variously between 1641 and 1660.

Gerard was the son of Sir Gilbert Gerard, 1st Baronet of Harrow on the Hill and his wife Mary Barrington, a daughter of Sir Francis Barrington and Joan Cromwell, and a cousin of Oliver Cromwell.

In 1641, Gerard was elected Member of Parliament for Seaford the Long Parliament and sat until 1648. In 1659 he was elected MP for Middlesex in the Third Protectorate Parliament.

In 1660, Gerard was elected Member of Parliament for Bossiney in the Convention Parliament. He inherited the baronetcy on the death of his father in 1670.

Gerard died at the age of 63.

Gerard married Isabel Cheek, daughter of Sir Thomas Cheek. Their three sons Charles, Francis and Cheek successively inherited the baronetcy.

Baronetage of England
Preceded by Gilbert Gerard	Baronet (of Harrow on the Hill); 1670–1680	Succeeded by Charles Gerard
