= Viscount Lake =

Extinct viscountcy in the Peerage of the United Kingdom

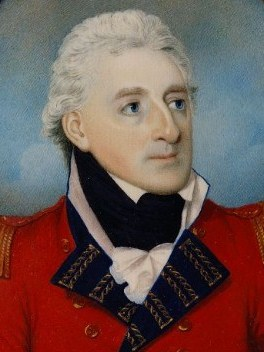
Gerard Lake, 1st Viscount Lake.

Viscount Lake, of Delhi and Laswary and of Aston Clinton in the County of Buckingham, was a title in the Peerage of the United Kingdom.

The peerage was created on 31 October 1807 for the prominent soldier Gerard Lake, 1st Baron Lake. He commanded the victorious British forces at the Battle of Laswari, which took place on 1 November 1803 near Laswari village, Alwar, during the Second Anglo-Maratha War. Lake was Commander-in-Chief of India from 1801 to 1805 and from 1805 to 1807. Lake had already been created Baron Lake, of Delhi and Laswary and of Aston Clinton in the County of Buckingham, on 1 September 1804, also in the Peerage of the United Kingdom. The titles became extinct on the death of the third Viscount in 1848.

== Viscounts Lake (1807) ==
- Gerard Lake, 1st Viscount Lake (1744–1808)
- Francis Gerard Lake, 2nd Viscount Lake (1772–1836)
- Warwick Lake, 3rd Viscount Lake (1783–1848). On 13 December 1807, when he was then captain of HMS Recruit, Lake marooned an impressed seaman, Robert Jeffrey, on Sombrero Island for having stolen rum and beer while the crew was on short rations. Eight days later, Capt. John Dennis of the American schooner Adam, out of Marblehead, saw Jeffrey waving his arms and rescued him. Apparently, Jeffrey was only slightly emaciated but initially incapable of speech. He went on to live in Marblehead, where he pursued his original trade of blacksmith. Some months later, Lake's commanding officer, Sir Alexander Cochrane, discovered what had happened and immediately ordered Lake to retrieve Jeffrey. When Recruit arrived at Sombrero, Jeffrey could not be found. Eventually, when the Royal Navy found out Jeffrey's whereabouts, it repatriated him. On 14 June 1810, HMS Frolic arrived at Sombrero Island in the West Indies. A party from the vessel searched the island to assess the survival prospects for someone landed at this place without food and water as Lake was then the subject of an Admiralty investigation. A subsequent court-martial dismissed Lake, who in the meantime had become captain of HMS Ulysses, from the King's service. Lake settled with Jeffrey out of court for £600 to avoid a civil suit.
