= Scorie Barker =

English politician (died 1713)

Scorie Barker (c. 1652 – 1713) was an English politician and lawyer. He sat as MP for Wallingford from March 1679 till March 1681 and Middlesex from 1705 till 1710.

He was the first son of Henry Barker (died 1695) and Anne, the daughter of Chaloner Chute. He entered the Middle Temple in 1662 and was called to the bar in 1675. He was matriculated at Oriel College, Oxford on 17 May 1667 at the age of 15. His marriage to Anne, the daughter of Sir John Robinson, 1st Baronet was licensed on 19 May 1679. They had eight sons and five daughters.
