= Thomas Evans (conspirator) =

British revolutionary conspirator

Thomas Evans (c. 1763 – by 1831) was a British revolutionary conspirator. Active in the 1790s and the period 1816–1820, he is otherwise a shadowy character, known mainly as a hardline follower of Thomas Spence.

== Early life ==
By 1794 Evans was living in London, married to Janet Galloway, also a radical. At this point they were in Soho, supporting themselves by colouring engravings, which included "bawdy prints". They were in Frith Street, and provided there a mailing address to some reformers.

In 1796 the couple moved to Fetter Lane. Evans had a number of trades, including baker, and shortly an income enough to rent space there adequate to host radical meetings. In early 1797, Evans was leader in London of the United Englishmen, with John Bone and Alexander Galloway, Janet's brother. The United Englishmen aimed at co-ordinated armed risings in England, Scotland and Ireland, at the time of a French invasion. From 1797, the Fetter Lane house saw visits from Benjamin Binns, brother of John Binns, the Manchester radical John Smith, and James O'Coigly.

In 1798 Evans was secretary of the London Corresponding Society (LCS), with which he had been involved for some years.

== First time in prison ==
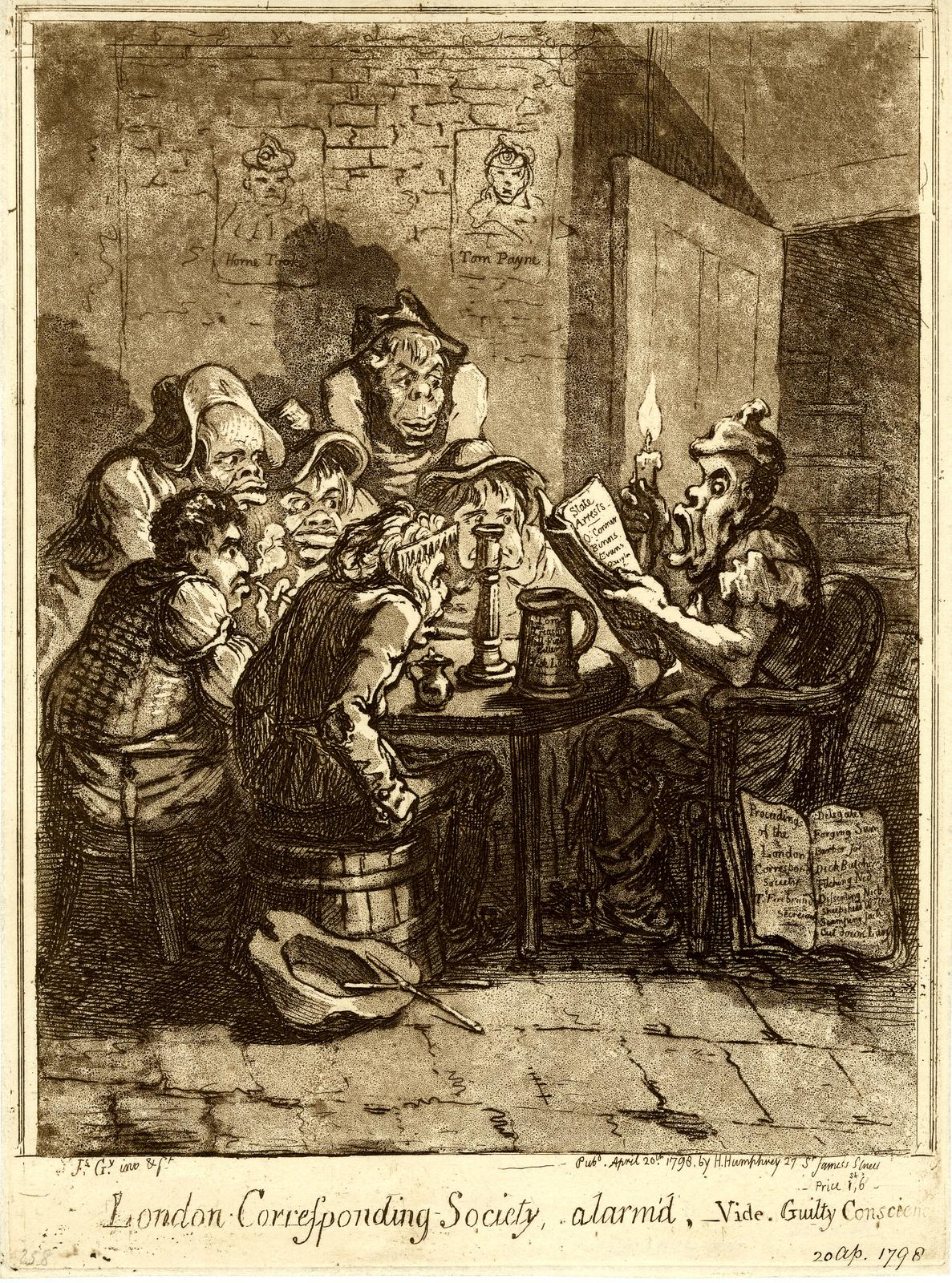
London Corresponding Society, Alarm'd (1798), satirical print by James Gillray, with the right-hand figure reading a list of "State Arrests", (O'Connor, Binns, Evans, O'Coigley)

In April 1798 Evans was arrested, in a roundup of the United Englishmen. He was not put on trial, but was in detention for three years. It followed the re-arrest in February of Arthur O'Connor at Margate, seeking passage to France. Questioned after his arrest, Evans admitted removing a box of LCS papers from his house after O'Connor was picked up with John Binns; and his role as a signatory, with Robert Thomas Crossfield of the LCS, of an address by Binns for the LCS to the "Irish Nation", which the government had discovered in Dublin.

Evans was held under the Habeas Corpus Suspension Act 1798. He referred to that circumstance, and his time in confinement, in an 1817 petition to the House of Commons presented by Charles Augustus Bennet. Robert Cutlar Fergusson, a barrister involved in the defense of Binns, O'Coigly and O'Connor in May 1798, in 1799 tried unsuccessfully to argue that a house of correction was unsuitable as a place of custody for Evans, accused of high treason. Evans was being held in the House of Correction for Middlesex, Coldbath Fields Prison, where the governor was Thomas Aris.

Sir Francis Burdett met Evans in Coldbath Fields Prison in 1798. Burdett subsequently ran a campaign in parliament against governor Aris, for maltreatment of prisoners, with information provided by Evans, John Bone and a United Irishman, Patrick William Duffin, confined in the prison. Burdett was then barred from the prison, which also housed Edward Despard, in January 1799. By the end of 1800 he had substantially justified his case. There was also an out-of-doors publicity campaign by a radical group including Peter Finnerty, J. S. Jordan, John Horne Tooke and Robert Waithman.

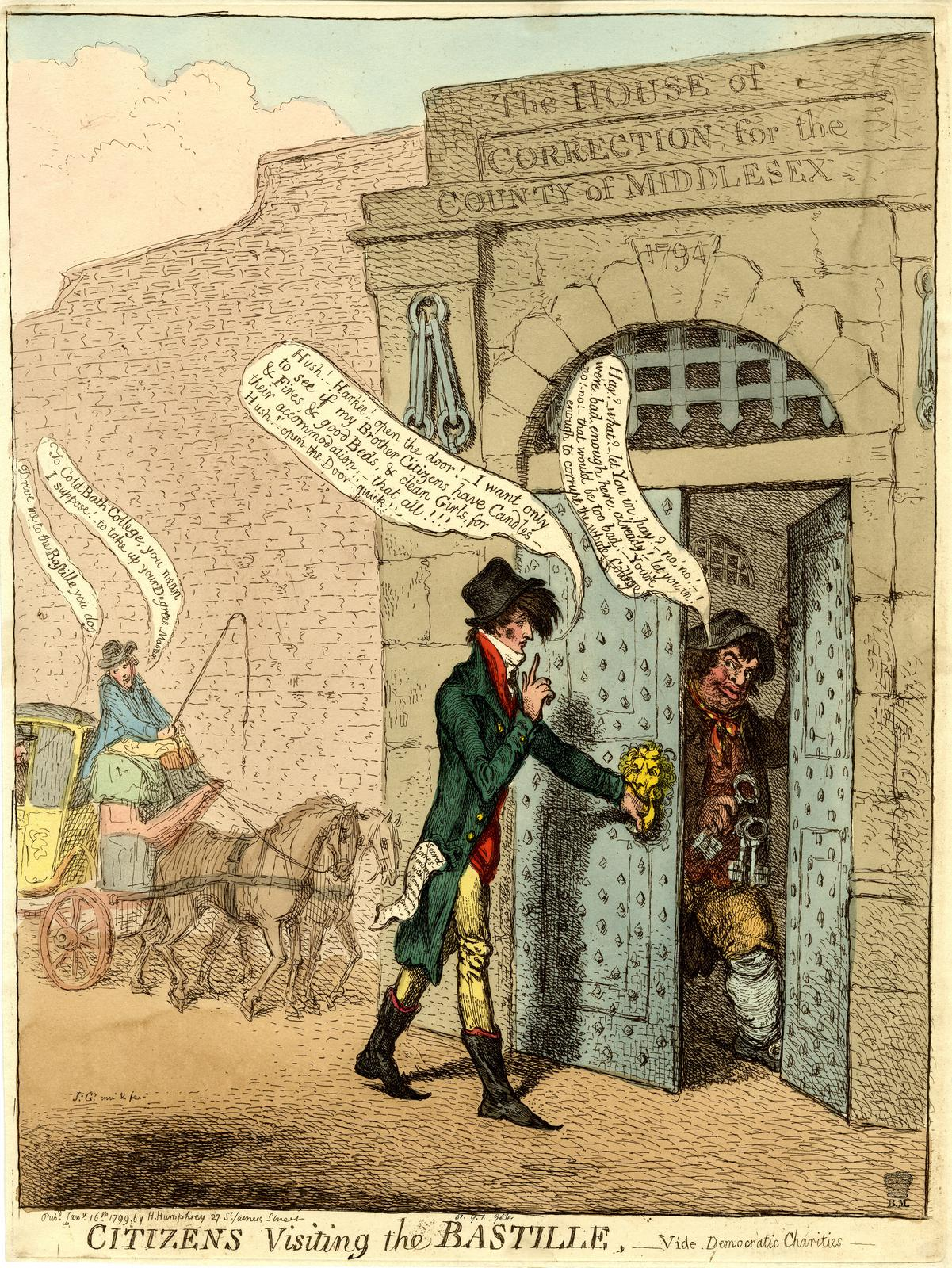
Citizens visiting the Bastille, 1799 satirical print by James Gillray of Sir Francis Burdett arriving at Coldbath Fields Prison

== 1801–1817 ==
Evans was released in March 1801. He was set up in business as a manufacturer by his wife Janet, making steel springs and the leather braces that went with them. She used a legacy she had received after the death of her father in 1799.

In the 1802 United Kingdom general election, Burdett made a successful move of seats, standing for Middlesex. Evans associated with his campaign, which was against William Mainwaring. Mainwaring, leader of Middlesex magistracy, had been heavily involved in Tory efforts to blunt his criticism of Aris. Burdett had the backing of the "Wimbledon circle" of radical lawyers around Horne Tooke. Evans made himself useful as a go-between for them and the more extreme radicals, on behalf of Burdett.

In 1803, not long after the execution of Edward Despard, police arrested Arthur Seale, a printer in Tottenham Court Road, for publishing a subversive handbill "Are You Right". They believed Evans to be its author; and responsible also for a pamphlet set up in print they found, about Despard's trial. Spencer Perceval and Sir Richard Ford offered Seale a chance to escape prison if he incriminated Evans. Seale shunned the chance and was sentenced to six months in Newgate Gaol. From this period, Evans kept a low profile for a decade, meeting the like-minded in taverns.

In 1814 the radical Thomas Spence died, and Evans assumed his mantle, including his championing of common ownership as the basis of land reform. He became leader of the group of around 40 Spenceans, drawn from artisans. Within two years, the Society of Spencean Philanthropists had become a revolutionary group, including the Burdettite Thomas Preston (1774–1850), Arthur Thistlewood and James Watson (1766–1838). Evans himself engaged in political debate with Christian Policy: the Salvation of the Empire (1816), which was answered by Thomas Malthus and Robert Southey.

== Second time in prison ==
Evans was arrested, suspected of involvement in the planning of the Spa Fields riots of November and December 1816. After habeas corpus was suspended in March 1817, he was held without trial until 1818. He was kept once more Coldbath Fields Prison, and his son was in Horsemonger Lane Gaol.

== Later life ==
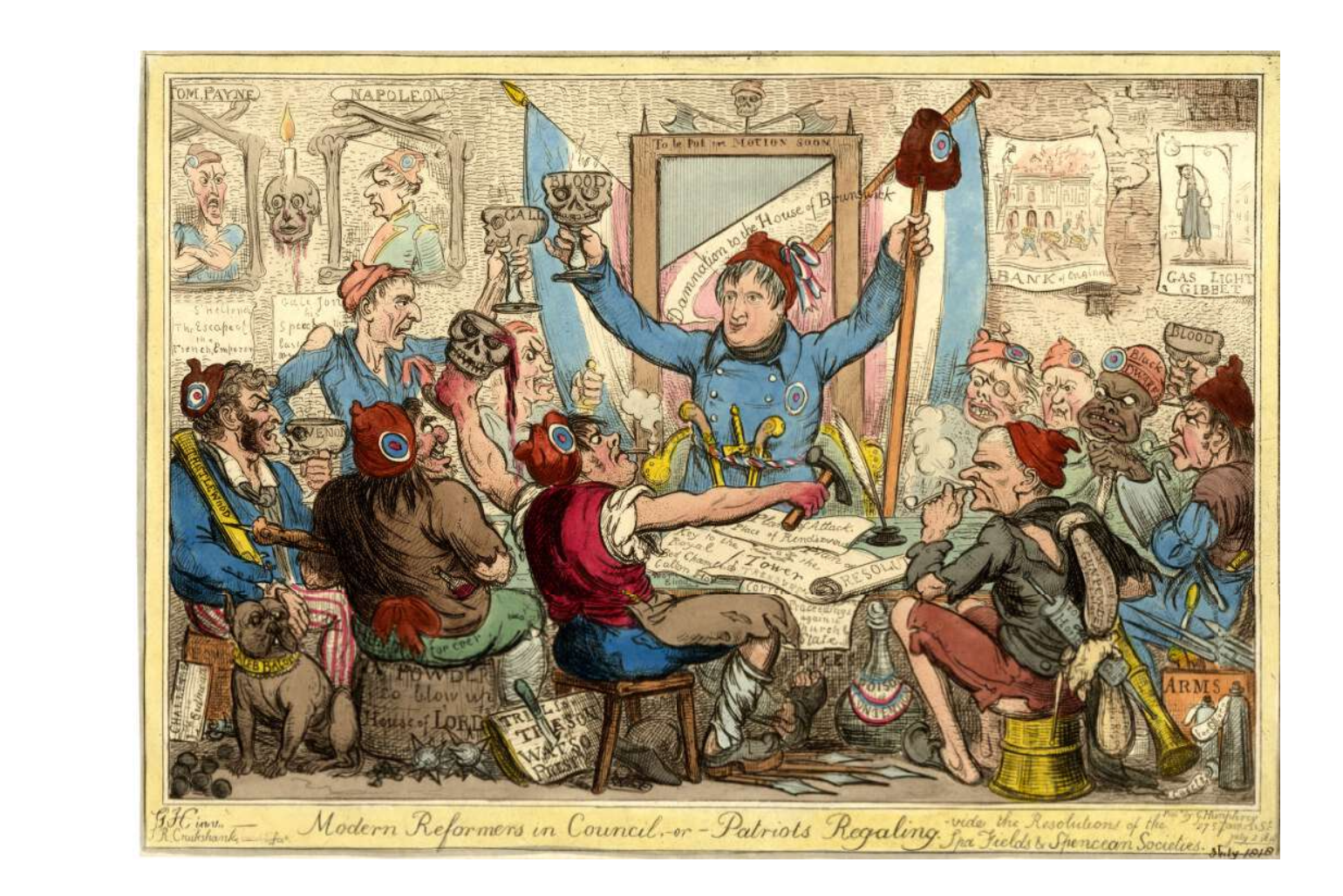
Modern Reformers in Council, subtitle "vide the Resolutions of the Spa Fields & Spencean Societies", 1818 caricature by Robert Cruikshank, with Henry Hunt shown addressing Spencean admirers (British Museum identification of, left to right, Arthur Thistlewood, John Gale Jones standing, (unknown), presumed Thomas Preston as cobbler, Hunt standing, James Watson, Thomas Jonathan Wooler as an African, a butcher)

On his release, Evans in partnership with Robert Wedderburn took a lease on a chapel on Archer Street in Soho. It was at least nominally a Unitarian place of worship, and became a Spencean centre. Wedderburn broke with Evans in April 1819, moving his chapel within Soho to Hopkins Street, and plotting revolution. Evans attended the post-Peterloo meeting at the Crown and Anchor, Strand of September 1819 for the "Westminster Committee of 200" with his son, Richard Carlile also being there.

In the aftermath of the failed Cato Street conspiracy of 1820, led by Thistlewood and other Spenceans, Evans raised funds for the families of the arrested plotters. Shortly afterwards he moved to Manchester, living with his son.

== Relationship with Francis Place ==
Francis Place was a prominent LCS member of the 1790s, and in the 1820s an effective leader of the artisan radicals. Towards the end of the Napoleonic Wars he became a target for the group around Evans and Thistlewood. Since his accounts of those years came to have high standing, Place's severe criticisms of these opponents have affected the historiography of London radicalism. In relation to a London power struggle in 1816–1817, E. P. Thompson commented in The Making of the English Working Class that "Place is not a disinterested witness"; and that the Spenceans prepared the ground for Robert Owen and his New View of Society.

Place was the jury foreman for the inquest into the Sellis incident involving the Duke of Cumberland. The jury concluded that Joseph Sellis, valet to the Duke, had committed suicide. The verdict was unpopular with the Burdettite radicals. Evans, with John King (Jacob Rey) the moneylender and Duffin, were in a group who attempted blackmail of Place over his part in the outcome. Duffin used the pages of the Independent Whig, of which he was co-founder in 1806, to make allegations that Place was in the pay of the government.

Burdett's influence prevailed when Place, with Joseph Hume and James Mill, was interested in the educational project of a West London Lancasterian Association, founded on the ideas of Joseph Lancaster, was floated in 1813. In 1814, Francis Burdett intervened and imposed on it his associates Evans and Arthur Thistlewood. The sidelined Place then abandoned politics for four years.

== Works ==
- Christian Policy, the Salvation of the Empire (1816), published by Arthur Seale.
- Christian Policy In Full Practice (1818), which makes reference to the Harmonists of Pennsylvania. These works combined agrarianism with the invocation of the biblical jubilee.

== Family ==
Evans and his wife Janet had a son, Thomas John Evans, born shortly before his father was imprisoned for the first time. He travelled to Paris in 1814, and in February 1820 took over as editor of the Manchester Observer from James Wroe, with backing from Francis Place and his uncle Alexander Galloway.
