= John Copley, 1st Baron Lyndhurst =

British lawyer and politician (1772–1863)

The Right Honourable The Lord Lyndhurst PC QS FRS
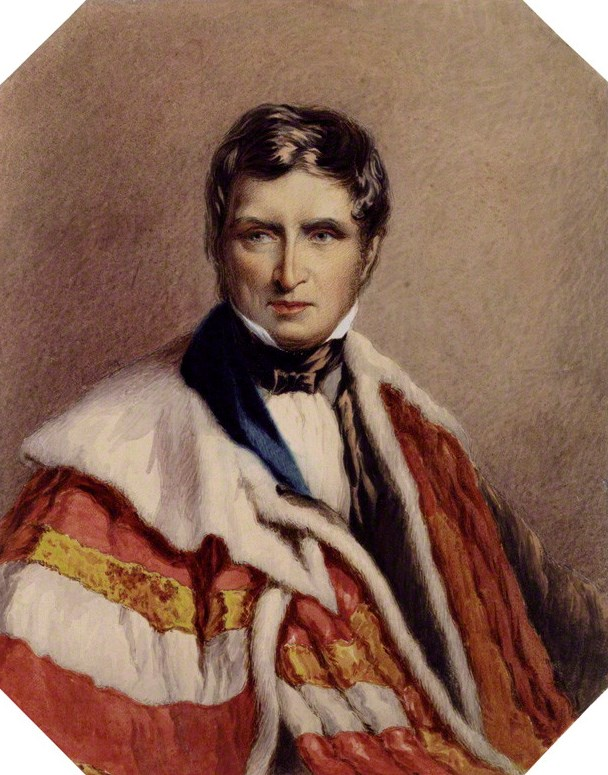
- Lord Lyndhurst wearing the parliamentary robes of a baron, portrait by Felix Rogge c.1836

Lord Chancellor
- In office 2 May 1827 – 24 November 1830
- Monarchs: George IV; William IV
- Prime Minister: George Canning; The Viscount Goderich; The Duke of Wellington
- Preceded by: The Earl of Eldon
- Succeeded by: The Lord Brougham and Vaux
- In office 21 November 1834 – 8 April 1835
- Monarch: William IV
- Prime Minister: The Duke of Wellington; Sir Robert Peel, Bt
- Preceded by: The Lord Brougham and Vaux
- Succeeded by: In Commission
- In office 3 September 1841 – 27 June 1846
- Monarch: Victoria
- Prime Minister: Sir Robert Peel, Bt
- Preceded by: The Lord Cottenham
- Succeeded by: The Lord Cottenham

Personal details
- Born: 21 May 1772 Boston, Province of Massachusetts Bay
- Died: 12 October 1863 (aged 91) London, United Kingdom
- Party: Tory
- Spouses: Sarah Brunsden (m. 1809; died 1834) Georgina Goldsmith (m. 1837)
- Education: Trinity College, Cambridge

John Singleton Copley, 1st Baron Lyndhurst, PC, QS, FRS (21 May 1772 – 12 October 1863), was a British lawyer and politician. He was three times Lord High Chancellor of Great Britain.

== Background and education ==
Copley was born in Boston, Massachusetts, the son of painter John Singleton Copley and his wife Susanna Farnham (née Clarke), granddaughter of silversmith Edward Winslow. His father left America to live in London in 1774, and his wife and son followed a year later. Copley was educated at a private school and Trinity College, Cambridge.

== Political and legal career ==
Called to the bar at Lincoln's Inn in 1804, he gained a considerable practice. He was appointed a serjeant-at-law on 6 July 1813. In 1817, he was one of the counsel for James Watson, tried for his share in the Spa Fields riots. Lyndhurst's performance attracted the attention of Lord Castlereagh and other Tory leaders, and he entered parliament as member for Yarmouth in the Isle of Wight. He afterwards sat for Ashburton (1818–1826) and for Cambridge University (1826–1827).

In December 1818, Copley was made King's Serjeant and Chief Justice of Chester. He became Solicitor General on 24 July 1819 and was knighted in October, became Attorney General in 1824, Master of the Rolls in 1826 and Lord Chancellor in 1827. On his appointment to the latter post he was raised to the peerage as Baron Lyndhurst, of Lyndhurst in the County of Southampton. As solicitor general he took a prominent part in the trial of Queen Caroline and was opposed to the Liberal measures which marked the end of the reign of George IV and the beginning of that of William IV. He was Lord Chief Baron of the Exchequer from 1831 to 1834. During the Melbourne government from 1835 to 1841 he figured conspicuously as an obstructionist in the House of Lords. His former adversary Lord Brougham, disgusted at his treatment by the Whig leaders, soon became his most powerful ally in opposition. Lyndhurst held the chancellorship from 1827 to 1830, 1834–1835, and 1841–1846. With regard to both Catholic emancipation and the agitation against the Corn Laws, he opposed reform until Peel, his chief, gave the signal for concession. In 1837 he was Rector of Marischal College (later Aberdeen University).

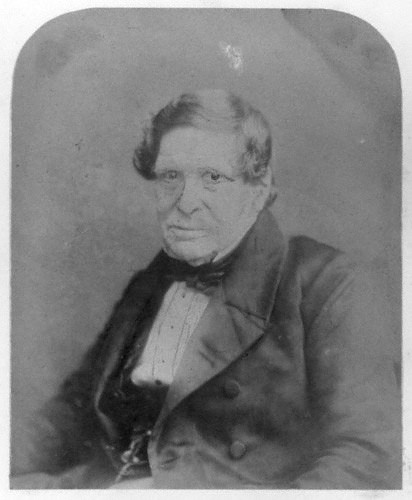
John Copley, 1st Baron Lyndhurst in the late 1850s.

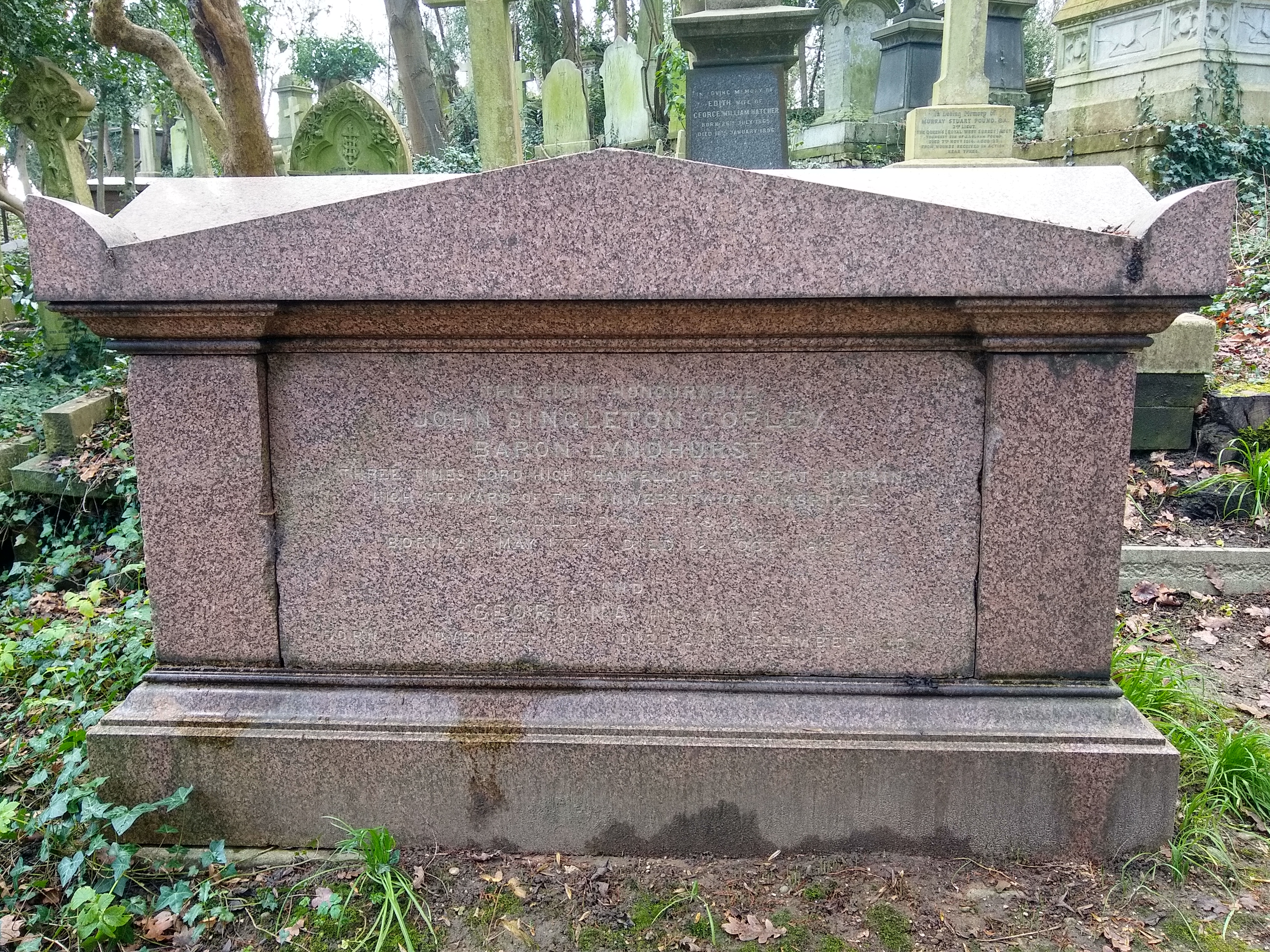
Grave of John Singleton Copley in Highgate Cemetery (west)

After 1846 and the disintegration of the Tory party over Peel's adoption of free trade, Lord Lyndhurst did not attend parliament sessions as often, but he continued to take a lively interest in public affairs and to make speeches. His address to the House of Lords on 19 June 1854, on the war with Russia, made a sensation in Europe, and throughout the Crimean War he was a strong advocate of the energetic prosecution of hostilities.

In 1854, Copley was appointed to the Royal Commission for Consolidating the Statute Law, a royal commission to consolidate existing statutes and enactments of English law.

In 1859 he denounced Napoleon III. His last speech was delivered in the House of Lords at the age of eighty-nine.

== Family ==
In 1819 Copley married Sarah, a daughter of Charles Brunsden and widow of Lieutenant-Colonel Charles Thomas, who was killed at Waterloo. She died in 1834, and three years later, in August 1837, he married Georgiana Goldsmith (1807–1901), daughter of writer Lewis Goldsmith, of Paris. They had two daughters, Georgiana Susan Copley, who married Sir Charles Du Cane, Governor of Tasmania, and Sophia Clarence Copley (1828–1911), who married Hamilton Beckett and is buried near her father in Highgate Cemetery.

Since his second wife came from a family of Jewish origins, it may be her influence which led Lyndhurst to support the Jewish Emancipation of 1858, when the law which had restricted the Parliamentary oath of office to Christians was changed, leading to the admission of Jews into parliament. Lyndhurst also advocated women's rights in questions of divorce.

He died in London on 12 October 1863 and was buried in Highgate Cemetery; as he left no son, his peerage became extinct. Lady Lyndhurst died in London 22 December 1901, aged 94.

== Arms ==
Coat of arms of John Copley, 1st Baron Lyndhurst
Crest An escallop Or in front of a dexter arm embowed in armour the hand grasping a sword and the cubit encircled with a chaplet of laurel all Proper. Escutcheon Argent a cross flory Sable within a bordure Azure charged with eight escallops of the field. Supporters Two eagles wings elevated Proper gorged with a plain collar Or and pendent therefrom a shield Argent charged with a cross flory Sable. Motto Ultra Pergere (To Push Onward)
