= Thistlewood =

Thistlewood is a surname. Notable people with the surname include:

- Arthur Thistlewood (1774–1820), English radical activist and conspirator known for the Thistlewood Conspiracy
- Lena Thistlewood, fictional character from Coronation Street
- Napoleon B. Thistlewood (1837–1915), American politician and civil war veteran
- Thomas Thistlewood (1721–1786), English-born slaveowner, planter and diarist

== See also ==
- Thistle
- Wood
