= Sociology of Manchester =

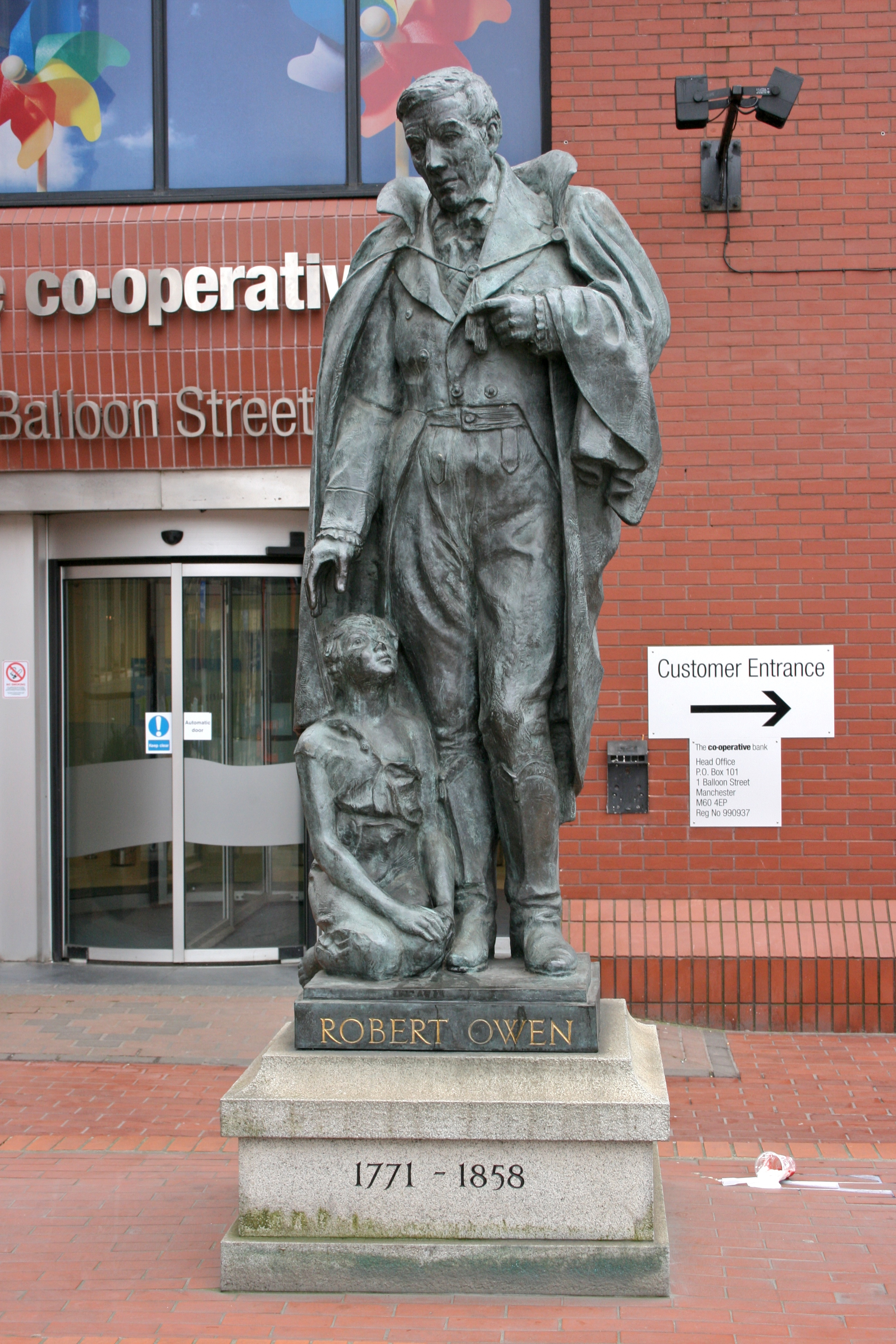
Robert Owen statue outside the Co-operative Bank Headquarters in Manchester

Manchester has historically influenced political and social thinking in Britain and been a hotbed for new, radical thinking, particularly during the Industrial Revolution.

The city was a centre for the women's suffrage, Co-operative, Communist, Chartist, and Anti-Corn Law movements. Friedrich Engels largely based The Condition of the Working Class in England on his observations of Manchester.

== Radicalism ==
=== Communism ===
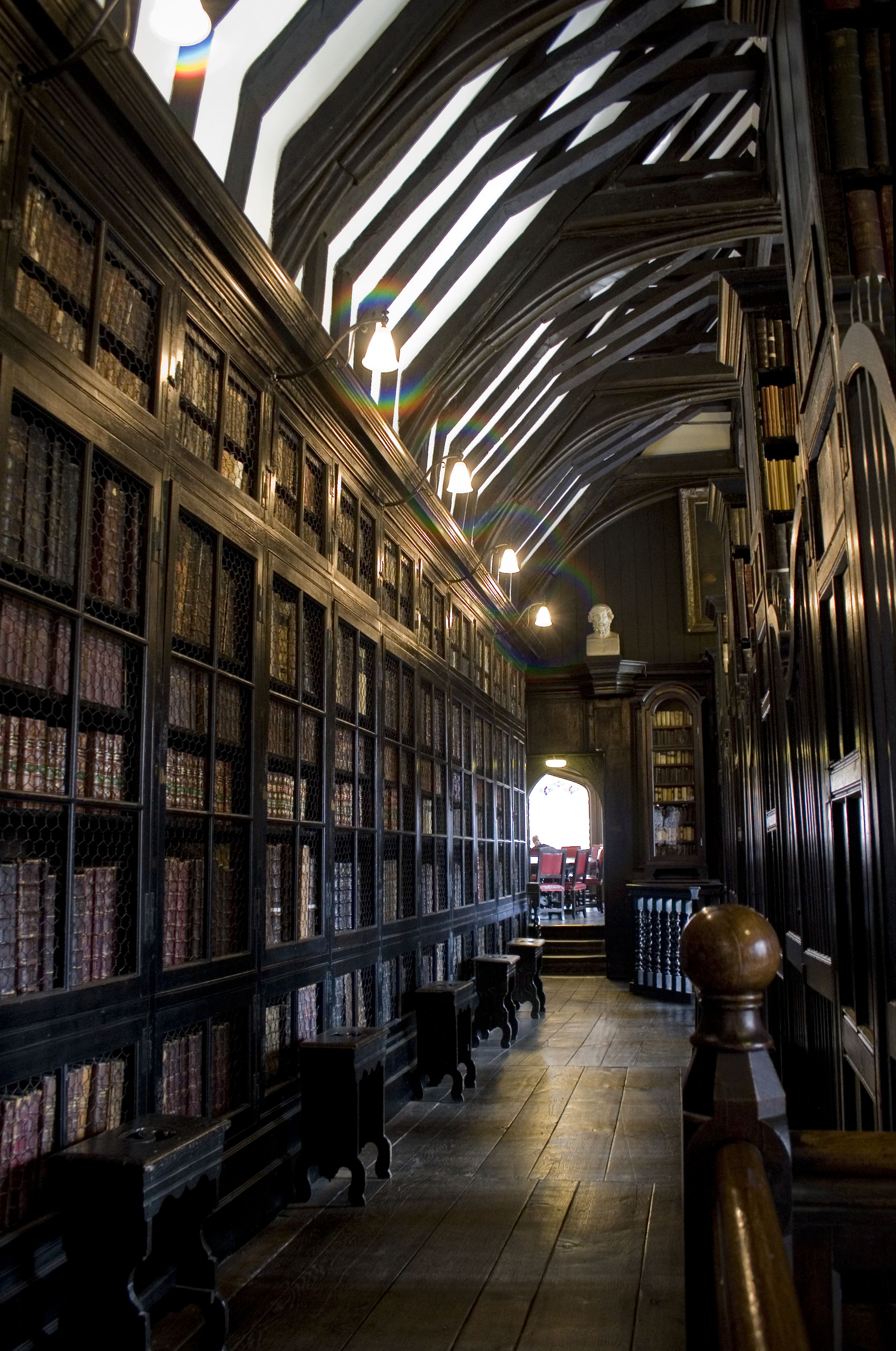
Chetham's Library, where Engels and Marx met to discuss Manchester's suffering and to outline proposals for Communism.

In 1842, 22-year-old Engels was sent by his parents to Manchester, Britain, to work for the Ermen and Engels' Victoria Mill in Weaste which made sewing threads. Engels' father thought that working at the Manchester firm might make Engels reconsider the opinions he had developed at the time. On his way to Manchester, Engels visited the office of the Rheinische Zeitung and met Karl Marx for the first time – they were not impressed by each other. Marx mistakenly thought that Engels was still associated with the Berliner Young Hegelians, with whom he (Marx) had just broken.

In Manchester, Engels met Mary Burns, a fierce young working woman with radical opinions, with whom he began a relationship that lasted until her death in 1862. The two never married, as both were against the institution of marriage, which Engels saw as unnatural and unjust. Burns guided Engels through Manchester and Salford, showing him the worst districts for his research. While in Manchester, Engels wrote his first economic work. This article was called "Outline of a Critique of Political Economy" and was written between October and November 1843. Engels sent the article to Paris, where Marx published it in the Deutsch-Französische Jahrbücher which Marx was now publishing in Paris. Engels also wrote a three part series of articles called "The Condition of England" in January, February and March 1844.

While observing the slums of Manchester in close detail, Engels took notes of the horrors he observed, notably child labour, the despoiled environment and overworked and impoverished labourers. and sent back a series of articles to Marx, first for publication in the Rheinische Zeitungand then for publication in Deutsch–Franzosische Jahrbucher, chronicling the conditions amongst the working class in Manchester. These he would later collect and publish in his influential first book, The Condition of the Working Class in England. The book was written between September 1844 and March 1845 and was printed in German in 1845. In the book, Engels gave way to his views on the "grim future of capitalism and the industrial age", and described in detail, street after street, the total squalor in which the working people were living. The book was published in English in 1887.

While writing it, Engels continued his involvement with radical journalism and politics. He frequented some areas also frequented by some members of the English labour and Chartist movements, whom he met, and wrote for several journals, including The Northern Star, Robert Owen's New Moral World and the Democratic Review newspaper. Engel's experiences in Manchester had a profound effect on his political philosophy, he viewed capitalism as an unnecessary evil and soon wrote The Communist Manifesto.

== Enfranchisement ==
=== 19th century ===
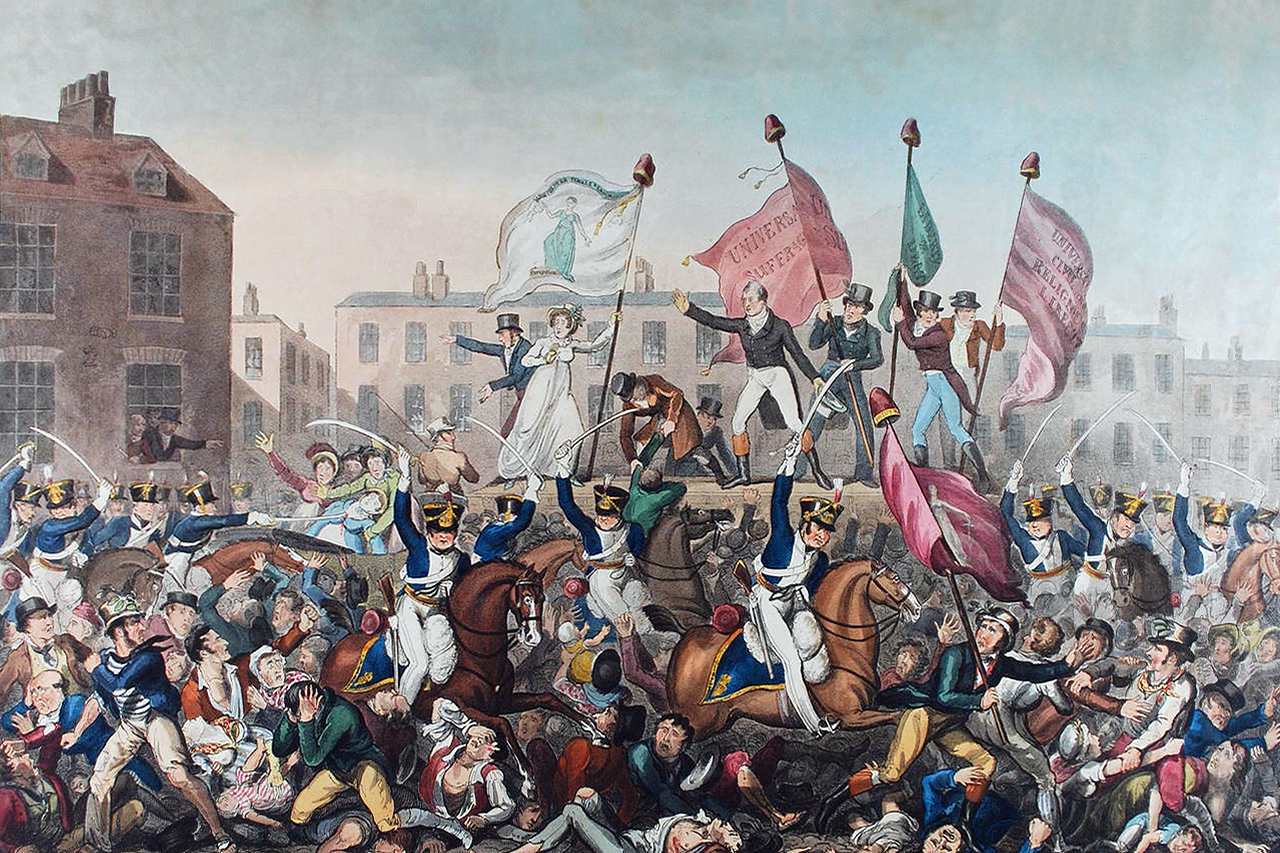
The Peterloo massacre, a 60,000–80,000 strong demonstration in August 1819 to demand parliamentary representation.

In 1819, Lancashire was represented by two members of parliament (MPs). Voting was restricted to the adult male owners of freehold land valued at 40 shillings or more – the equivalent of about £80 as of 2008 – and votes could only be cast at the county town of Lancaster, by a public spoken declaration at the hustings. Constituency boundaries were out of date, and the so-called "rotten boroughs" had a hugely disproportionate influence on the membership of the Parliament of the United Kingdom compared to the size of their populations: Old Sarum in Wiltshire, with one voter, elected two MPs, as did Dunwich in Suffolk, which by the early 19th century had almost completely disappeared into the sea. The major urban centres of Manchester, Salford, Bolton, Blackburn, Rochdale, Ashton-under-Lyne, Oldham and Stockport, with a combined population of almost one million, were represented by either the two county MPs for Lancashire, or the two for Cheshire in the case of Stockport. By comparison, more than half of all MPs were elected by a total of just 154 voters. These inequalities in political representation led to calls for reform.

After the end of the Napoleonic Wars in 1815, a brief boom in textile manufacture was followed by periods of economic depression, particularly among textile weavers and spinners. Weavers who could have expected to earn 15 shillings for a six-day week in 1803, saw their wages cut to 5 shillings or even 4s 6d by 1818. The industrialists, who were cutting wages without offering relief, blamed market forces generated by the aftershocks of the Napoleonic Wars. Exacerbating matters were the Corn Laws, the first of which was passed in 1815, imposing a tariff on foreign grain in an effort to protect English grain producers. The cost of food rose as people were forced to buy the more expensive and lower quality British grain, and periods of famine and chronic unemployment ensued, increasing the desire for political reform both in Lancashire and in the country at large.

By the beginning of 1819, the pressure generated by poor economic conditions was at its peak and had enhanced the appeal of political radicalism among the cotton loom weavers of south Lancashire. In response, coupled with the lack of suffrage in northern England, a "great assembly" was organised by the Manchester Patriotic Union, a group agitating for parliamentary reform, formed by radicals from the Manchester Observer: founder and journalist Joseph Johnson became secretary of the union, editor James Wroe its treasurer. Johnson wrote to the well-known radical orator Henry Hunt asking him to chair a large meeting planned for Manchester on 2 August 1819. In his letter, Johnson wrote:

Nothing but ruin and starvation stare one in the face [in the streets of Manchester and the surrounding towns], the state of this district is truly dreadful, and I believe nothing but the greatest exertions can prevent an insurrection. Oh, that you in London were prepared for it.

=== Women's suffrage ===
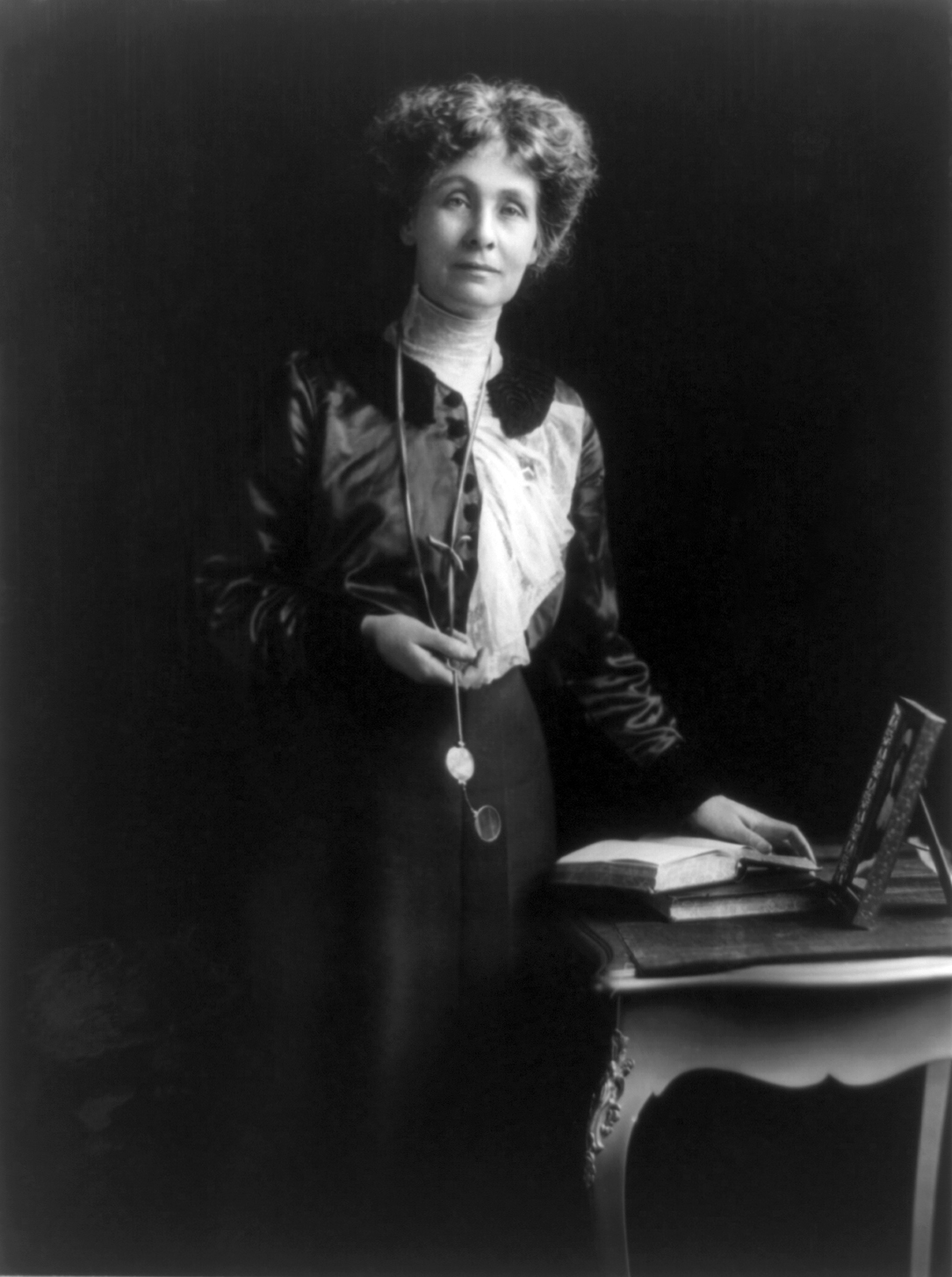
Emmeline Pankhurst, who was born in Moss Side and led the battle for women's suffrage.

The Women's Social and Political Union (WSPU) was founded at the Pankhurst family home in Manchester on 10 October 1903 by six women, including Emmeline and Christabel Pankhurst, who soon emerged as the group's leaders. The WSPU had split from the non-militant National Union of Women's Suffrage Societies, disappointed at the lack of success its tactics of persuading politicians through meetings had found.

The founders decided to form a women-only organisation, which would campaign for social reforms, largely in conjunction with the Independent Labour Party. They would also campaign for an extension of women's suffrage, believing that this was central to sexual equality. To illustrate their more militant stance, they adopted the slogan "deeds, not words". By 1913, the WSPU appointed the fiercely militant feminist Norah Dacre Fox (later known as Norah Elam) as general secretary. Dacre Fox operated as a highly effective propagandist, delivering rousing speeches at the WSPU weekly meetings and writing many of Christabel Pankhurst's speeches.

== Movements ==
=== Co-operative movement ===
In 1844, 28 textile workers in Rochdale founded the Rochdale Society of Equitable Pioneers and became the first to pay a patronage dividend, forming the basis for the modern co-operative movement. In 1863, many co-operatives in the north amalgamated and based themselves in Manchester. Today the Co-operative exists in the form of The Co-operative Group.

== Trade unionism ==
=== Trades Union Congress ===
The first Trades Union Congress (TUC) meeting was not held until 1868 when the Manchester and Salford Trades Council convened the founding meeting in the Manchester Mechanics' Institute (on what is now Princess Street and was then David Street; the building is at no. 103). The fact that the TUC was formed by Northern trades councils was not coincidental. One of the issues which prompted this initiative was the perception that the London Trades Council (formed in 1860 and including, because of its location, many of the most prominent union leaders of the day) was taking a dominant role in speaking for the Trade Union Movement as a whole.
