= Janet Evans (revolutionary) =

British revolutionary

- Born: Janet Galloway
- Died: after 1822
- Occupation(s): Revolutionary, print colourist
- Spouse: Thomas Evans

Janet Evans (née Galloway; died after 1822) was a British radical revolutionary and print colourist.

== Early life and marriage ==
Janet Galloway was born into a well-off London family and was the sister of London Corresponding Society member and mathematical machine maker Alexander Galloway. By May 1794, she had married her brother's LCS colleague Thomas Evans and together they worked as print colourists in Soho. By 1796, the couple had moved to 14 Plough Court, Fetters Lane, where she and her husband, now secretary of the LCS, hosted committee meetings for the society.

== Activism ==
=== Arrest ===
On 18 April 1798, Thomas Evans, Alexander Galloway, and others were arrested. Shortly thereafter, Janet, who was pregnant and nursing her young son Thomas John, was also arrested. She was held at a female prison, where she was interrogated before eventually being released. Shortly after her release, Evans gave birth to stillborn twins.

With her husband still in prison, Evans, with Sir Francis Burdett, campaigned for his release and for an improvement to prison conditions and a reduction in corruption. She was eventually banned from visiting Coldbath Fields Prison on the grounds of inciting a riot at the gates, and for signalling information to her husband's fellow prisoners. Throughout her husband's imprisonment, she maintained a frequent letter correspondence with him. During this time, she survived on subscriptions arranged by Francis Place. Thomas Evans was held without trial under the Habeas Corpus Suspension Act 1798 until he was released three years later. Following his release, using her inheritance from her father that she had received in October 1799, she set her husband up as a patent brace and steel spring manufacturer.

=== Spenceans ===
After her husband's release, the couple became involved with Radical Thomas Spence and his circle. Following Spence's death in 1814, Thomas Evans succeeded him as leader of the Society of Spencean Philanthropists, leading Janet and their son, T.J. Evans to become leading figures in the group. However, the Spenceans disbanded after disagreements on multiple issues, including the role of women in the group.

In around 1809, the Evans family moved to 8 Newcastle Street in the Strand, where they operated their businesses. In February 1817, Thomas Evans was arrested for a second time along with their son. She wrote extensively to the government and the press demanding their release, in addition to smuggling political material into the prison. Her brother Alexander collected subscriptions during their imprisonment for her to keep their business running.

== Later life ==
After her husband and son's release, the family was politically marginalised and their businesses collapsed. They then opened a radical newsroom and coffee shop. In 1820, T. J. Evans bought the Manchester Observer newspaper, with financial support from his uncle Alexander Galloway, and the whole family moved north. However, the newspaper was sold when T. J. Evans was jailed for libelling the army and the family returned to London in summer 1822. After this, there is no further mention of Janet Evans and it is assumed that she died sometime between 1822 and 1831.
