= Richard Birnie (barrister) =

Australian barrister

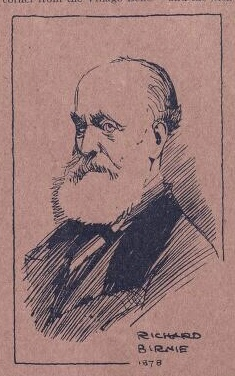
Richard Birnie, 1878

Richard Birnie (1808–1888), was a barrister in colonial Australia.

Birnie was the second son of Sir Richard Birnie, Chief Metropolitan Police Magistrate at Bow Street, was born in London in 1808. He was educated at Trinity College, Cambridge, where he graduated BA in 1830, and MA in 1837. He entered at the Inner Temple on 9 January 1828 and was called to the bar on 7 May 1833. After practising in the Central Criminal Court Mr. Birnie was appointed by the Duke of Newcastle to be Advocate-General of Western Australia, in which colony he arrived in January 1854. After holding this post for nearly six years he acted as judge for about a year. Arriving in 1859 in Melbourne, he was called to the Victorian bar on 13 October the same year. He was on several occasions employed as crown prosecutor in Victoria, but has been mainly known as a contributor of several hundred essays to the Australasian. A selection of these were later published as, Essays Social, Moral and Political by a Barrister-at-law, (Melbourne, 1879). His father, Sir Richard Birnie, was originally a saddler, but is chiefly known by his success in detecting and hunting down the Cato Street conspirators.
