= Jane Evans =

Jane Evans may refer to:

- Jane Evans (activist) (1907–2004), American Reform Jewish leader
- Jane Evans (artist) (1946–2012), New Zealand artist

== See also ==
- Jane Evans Elliot (1820–1886), American diarist
- Janet Evans (born 1971), American swimmer
- Janet Evans (revolutionary), British revolutionary
