= Coldbath Fields Prison =

Prison in Clerkenwell, London, England

Coldbath Fields Prison "The Steel"
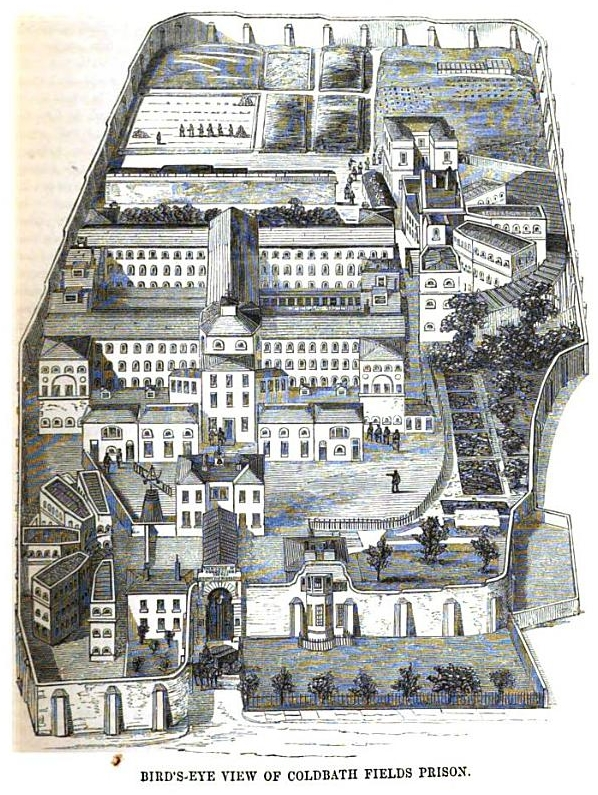
- Bird's-eye view of Coldbath Fields.
- Interactive map of Coldbath Fields Prison "The Steel"
- Location: Clerkenwell, London; 51°31′31″N 0°06′46″W
- Status: Closed
- Capacity: 2,000
- Population: 1,700 (1877)
- Opened: 1794
- Closed: 1885
- Former name: Middlesex House of Correction
- Managed by: Middlesex Guildhall

Notable prisoners
- Edward Marcus Despard, William Thomas Stead, Owen Suffolk

Coldbath Fields Prison, also formerly known as the Middlesex House of Correction and Clerkenwell Gaol and informally known as the Steel, was a prison in the Mount Pleasant area of Clerkenwell, London. Founded in the reign of James I (1603–1625) it was completely rebuilt in 1794 and extended in 1850. It housed prisoners on short sentences of up to two years. Blocks emerged to segregate felons, misdemeanants and vagrants. The prison closed in 1885.

== History ==
Coldbath Fields Prison (also known as the Middlesex House of Correction) was originally a prison run by local magistrates and where most prisoners served short sentences. Coldbath Fields also served as a debtor's prison. It took its name from Cold Bath Spring, a medicinal spring discovered in 1697. The prison housed men, women and children until 1850, when the women and children moved to Tothill Fields Bridewell in Victoria (Westminster) leaving only male offenders over the age of 17. Despite its aspirations to be more humanitarian (its redesign was by John Howard), it became notorious for its strict regime of silence and its use of the treadmill.

Since 1793 Britain had been at war with France, and William Pitt’s government became increasingly drawn into attempts to restrain the growth of radical republican societies, such as the London Corresponding Society, especially in the East End of London. The Middlesex magistrates and police offices were a key part of this strategy.

In 1798 the magistrates, including Joseph Merceron, the corrupt 'Boss of Bethnal Green', became embroiled in a scandal over the conditions at Coldbath Fields, where several radical (also known as reformist) party sympathisers, including Colonel Edward Despard, were being held without trial. The scandal was exposed in Parliament by the young radical MP Sir Francis Burdett, who used it as the basis of his campaign against the chair of the magistrates William Mainwaring and his son George in the 1802 and 1804 Middlesex parliamentary elections.

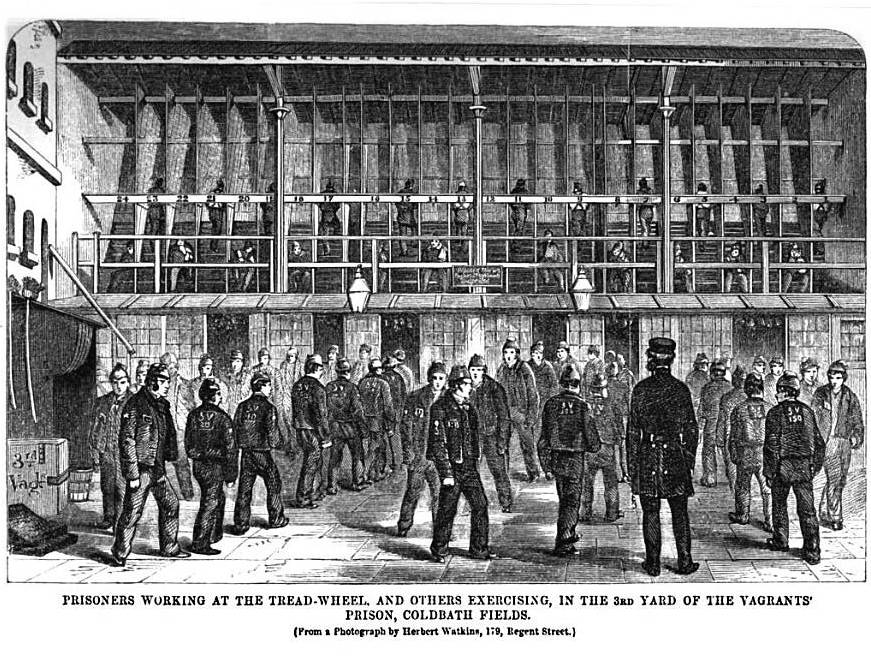
Vagrants exercising and on the treadmill

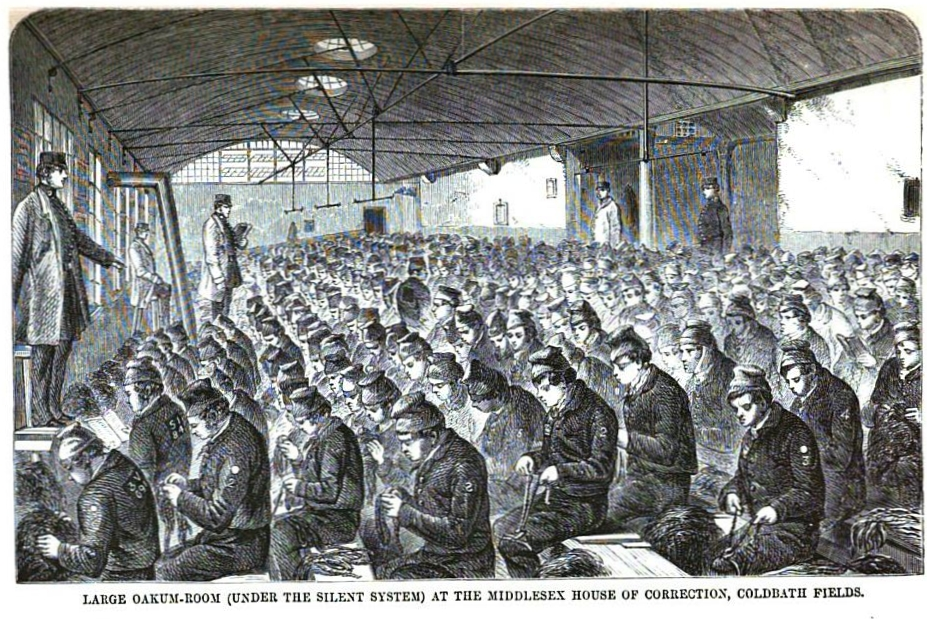
Prisoners picking oakum

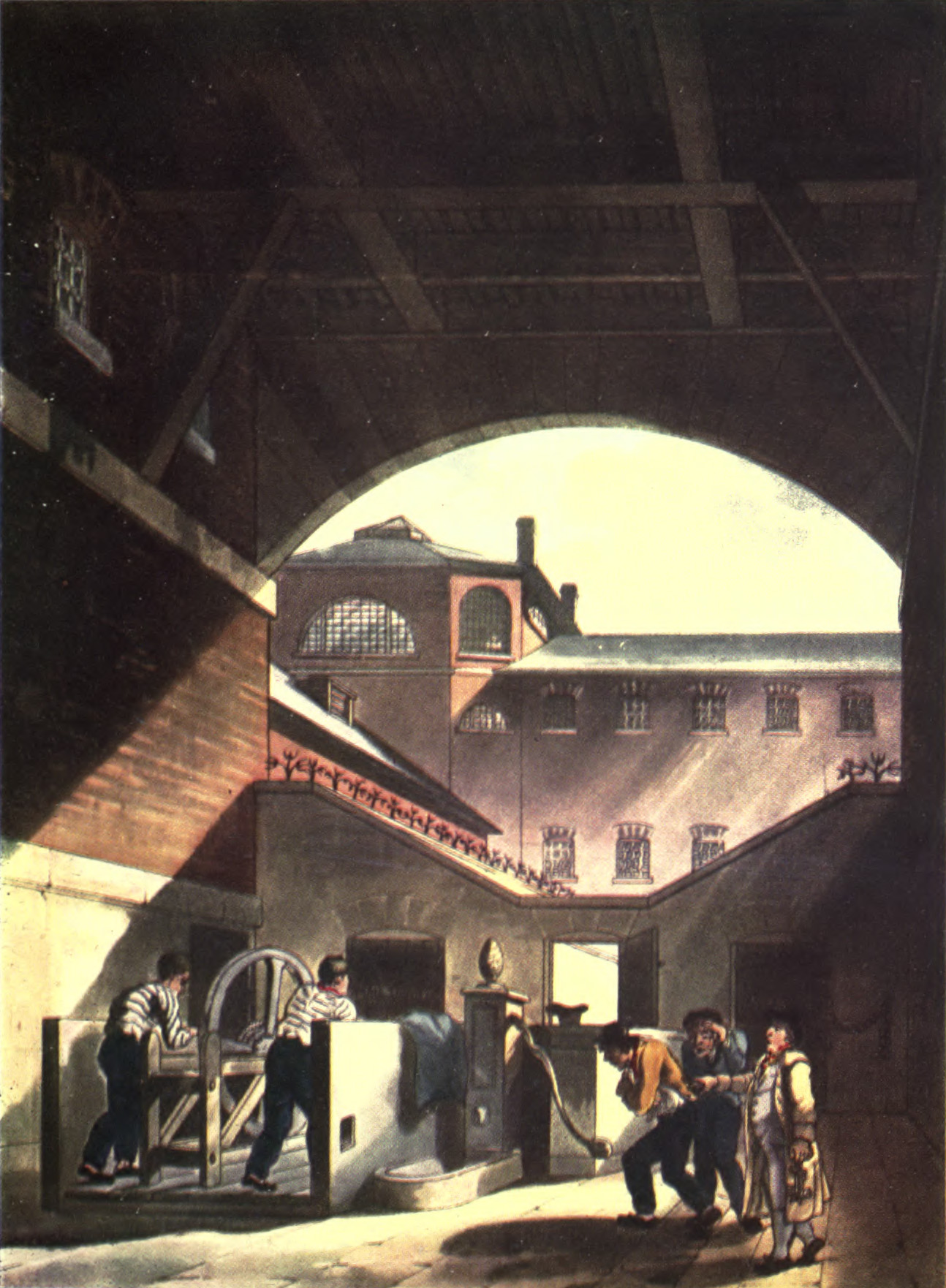
Two prisoners working the water engine in the prison, from Ackermann's Microcosm of London, 1808

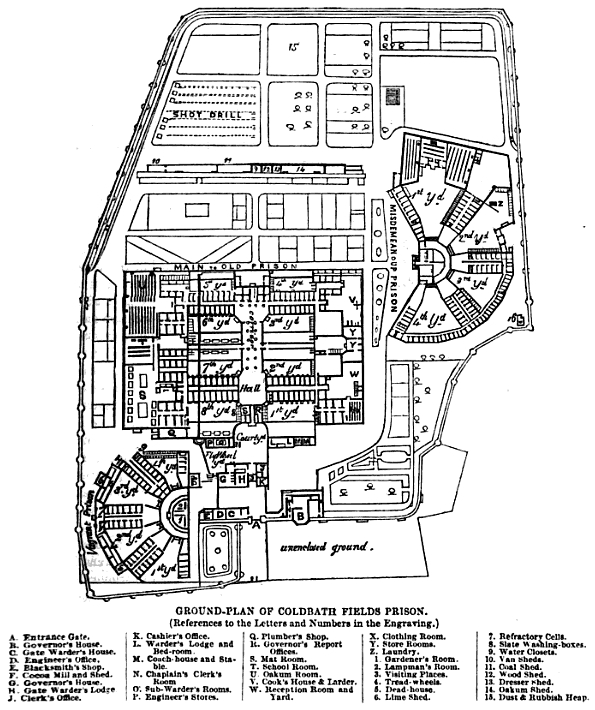
Detailed internal plan
Crop of Christopher and John Greenwood's 8 inch-to-mile map published in 1827 from an 1830 republication (click to view all). Note the 1827-marked "New Female Ward" in the north.

During the early 19th century, the prison temporarily housed members of the Cato Street Conspiracy. In March 1877 a fire, which started in the bakehouse, destroyed the treadmill house; no prisoners were hurt but two firemen were injured.

The prison closed in 1885. The site was transferred to the Post Office in 1889 and its buildings were gradually replaced. The last sections were demolished in 1929 for an extension of the Letter Office. Today, the site is occupied by the Mount Pleasant sorting office.

== Famous inmates ==
- Edward Dando, thief and glutton in London
- Edward Despard, colonel and Superintendent of British Honduras, imprisoned for revolutionary activity, and later executed for his part in the Despard Plot
- John Gravener Henson, workers' leader and historian of framework-knitters
- Owen Suffolk, bushranger
- Robert Wedderburn, ultra-radical leader and anti-slavery advocate
- Arthur Thistlewood, English radical activist and conspirator in the Cato Street Conspiracy. In 1820 he together with the other Cato Street conspirators were lodged here, before being sent to the Tower.
- George Julian Harney, English political activist, journalist, and Chartist leader.
- Johann Most, German socialist, editor of Freiheit (Freedom)
- Poulett Somerset, captain Coldstream Guards, 10 days' imprisonment for horsewhipping a police constable on duty outside the Crystal Palace during the Great Exhibition.

== In literature ==
The Devil's Thoughts (1799), a poem attributed to Samuel Taylor Coleridge and Robert Southey (and others), contains the stanza

As he went through Coldbath-fields, he saw
A solitary cell;
And the devil was pleased, for it gave him a hint
For improving his prisons in hell.

In Samuel Butler's semi-autobiographical novel The Way of All Flesh the hero, Ernest Pontifex, is sentenced to six months' hard labour in Coldbath Fields prison: chapters 64-70.
