= William Davidson (conspirator) =

Jamaican activist (1781-1820)

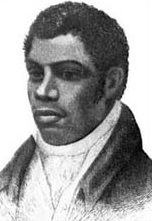
William Davidson

William Davidson (c. 1781 – May 1, 1820) was a British African-Caribbean Guy Fawkes regency radical, executed for his role in the Cato Street Conspiracy against Lord Liverpool's government in 1820.

== Early years ==
Davidson was the illegitimate son of Robert Sewell (1751 – 30 April 1828), the Attorney General of Jamaica, and a local black woman. At the age of 14, Davidson travelled to Glasgow to study law. In Scotland he became involved in the movement for parliamentary reform. He was apprenticed to a Liverpool lawyer but ran away to sea. Later, he was press-ganged into the Royal Navy.

After his discharge, he returned to Scotland. His father arranged for him to study mathematics in Aberdeen. Davidson withdrew from study, moved to Birmingham, and started a cabinet-making business. He courted the daughter of a prosperous merchant. Her father suspected that Davidson was after her £7,000 dowry, and arranged for Davidson to be arrested on a false charge. When Davidson discovered she had married someone else he attempted suicide by taking poison.

Davidson's cabinet-making business failed, and he moved to London. He married Sarah Lane, a working-class widow with four children. They had two more children. Davidson became a Wesleyan Methodist, and taught at the Sunday School. However, he left after he was accused of attempting to seduce a female student.

== Political activism ==
Following the Peterloo Massacre, William Davidson became involved in radical politics again. In October 1819 Richard Carlile was found guilty of blasphemy and seditious libel, and sentenced to three years imprisonment. Davidson said that this had caused him to lose his belief in God. He joined the Marylebone Union Reading Society, a club that offered a reading room of radical newspapers such as The Republican and the Manchester Observer for a subscription of twopence a week. He also read the works of Thomas Paine.

Davidson met John Harrison at the Marylebone Union. Harrison was a member of the Spencean Philanthropists in London. Davidson soon became a Spencean. He met Arthur Thistlewood, and after a few months he became one of the Committee of Thirteen that ran the organisation.

In February 1820, George Edwards, a government provocateur, drew Davidson and Thistlewood and 27 other Spenceans into a plot to kill government cabinet officers as they dined at the Earl of Harrowby's house at 39, Grosvenor Square on 23 February. Thistlewood selected Davidson as one of an Executive of Five to organise the assassinations. (The dinner was a fictitious construction.)

Davidson had worked for Lord Harrowby in the past, and knew some of his staff at Grosvenor Square. His job was to find out more details about the cabinet meeting. One of the servants told him that the Earl of Harrowby was not in London. Davidson relayed this information to Arthur Thistlewood, who believed that the servant was lying, and ordered the conspirators to proceed with the plot.

On 23 February, the Cato Street Conspiracy met in a hayloft on Cato Street, near Grosvenor Square. However, there was no cabinet meeting: the Spenceans had been set up by an undercover police agent, George Edwards.

George Ruthven led 13 police officers to storm the hayloft. Several revolutionaries refused to surrender their weapons. Thistlewood killed police officer Richard Smithers with a single sword-thrust. Davidson had been acting as look-out.

When the co-conspirators tried to escape, Benjamin Gill hit Davidson on the wrist with his truncheon, and he dropped his blunderbuss. Four conspirators, Thistlewood, John Brunt, Robert Adams and John Harrison escaped through a window. However, their identities were given to the police by Edwards and they were quickly arrested.

Eleven men were charged with involvement in the Cato Street Conspiracy. Robert Adams testified against the other men, and charges against him were dropped. Davidson pleaded innocence and claimed the court was prejudiced against black people. However, his presence at the scene with a blunderbuss led to his conviction.

On 28 April 1820, William Davidson, James Ings, Richard Tidd, Arthur Thistlewood, and John Brunt were found guilty of high treason, and sentenced to death. John Harrison, James Wilson, Richard Bradburn, John Strange and Charles Copper were also found guilty. However their death sentences were subsequently commuted to transportation for life.

William Davidson, with his four fellow conspirators, was publicly hanged and decapitated outside Newgate Prison on 1 May 1820.

== Representation in media ==
William Davidson is featured in the short animation Cato Street to Newgate, written and directed by Jason Young. It was screened as part of Southwark Black History Month in 2020.
