= Owen Suffolk =

English bushranger and writer in Australia

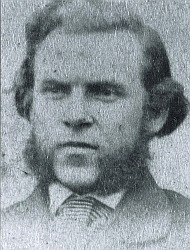
Owen Suffolk

Owen Hargrave Suffolk (born 4 April 1829) was an English-born Australian bushranger, poet, confidence-man and author of Days of Crime and Years of Suffering (1867).

== Early life ==
Owen Henry Suffolk was born on 4 April 1829 in comfortable circumstances in Finchley, Middlesex, England. He was sent to sea as a youth when his father, a London merchant, was ruined.

== Crime, imprisonment and transportation ==
On his return to England, Suffolk found himself homeless and fell into a life of crime. Charged with stealing in 1844, he was sentenced to a year’s detention. He was then convicted of forgery in 1846 serving time in Newgate, Millbank and Coldbath Fields prisons before being transported to Australia on the convict ship Joseph Somes in 1847. In Victoria, Australia, by his own account, he led a colorful life as a bushman, bushranger, and thief, and was frequently imprisoned as a repeat offender. During his third period of incarceration, commencing in 1858, he began writing his autobiography.

In July 1866, Suffolk received a ticket of leave, his third in Victoria, and a full pardon on board the Norfolk, which sailed for London on 20 September 1866. This pardon (in the possession of the National Museum of Australia) was conditional, with the condition being that Suffolk not return to Australia. Suffolk thus obtained the neat distinction of having twice been made an exile. His story, published in The Australasian newspaper in 1867, was well-written, racy and a powerful account of criminal and prison life by an insider, one that squared well with the popular fiction of the day. His account of family misfortune, ill treatment at school and at sea, subsequent misadventures, romantic interludes and descent into vagrancy and crime in London reads like a misplaced Charles Dickens plot. In Australia he tells of his youthful infatuation with crime and bushranging and his difficulties in finding honest work, and the hardships, injustices and folklore of prison life.

Back in England he quickly resumed his old habits as a confidence man, swindler and thief and added bigamist and deceiver of women. In March 1867, he married a widow, Mary Elizabeth Phelps, in London. In August 1868, Owen Suffolk, "a journalist", appeared before Lord Chief Justice Sir Alexander Cockburn at Ipswich, where he had been charged with stealing a black mare and carriage belonging to the landlady of the Great White Horse Hotel and obtaining ten pounds by false pretences. Suffolk begged for mercy on account of his de facto wife, aged 19, who was his brother's child, and her infant. The judge rejected the marriage as bigamous and sentenced Suffolk to 15 years penal servitude. By 1880 he had been released from prison and on 4 August he married Eliza Shreves at St Luke's Church in the parish of St Marylebone in London.

Suffolk began to scheme to fake his own death. He set it up by spending his spare time (which there was a lot of, as he was unemployed) rowing on the Thames. One day, when he was out boating with two others, the boat capsized. His companions were found exhausted and bedraggled on the river bank but Suffolk was thought to have drowned. Various newspaper offices were supplied with the information, headed, "Melancholy accident to an Australian gentleman." Later, it was discovered that the information had been written by the victim himself, who, by the time of the discovery, was on his way across the Atlantic with his wife's money.

He was last heard of in New York.

== Writer ==
Suffolk is remembered as Victoria's 'prison poet' and for his readable autobiography Days of Crime and Years of Suffering, which reveals much about London street life and the behaviour and treatment of criminals in the Victorian era. An important contribution to Australian literature, it influenced Marcus Clarke and his 1870–1872 novel For the Term of His Natural Life.

== See also ==
- List of convicts transported to Australia
