= Lewis Goldsmith =

Anglo-French publicist (died 1846)

Lewis Goldsmith (c. 1763 – 6 January 1846) was an Anglo-French publicist.

== Allied with Napoleon ==
In 1801, Goldsmith published The Crimes of Cabinets, or a Review of the Plans and Aggressions for Annihilating the Liberties of France and the Dismemberment of her Territories, an attack on the military policy of Pitt. Soon afterward, in 1802, he moved from London to Paris. There Talleyrand introduced him to Napoleon. With Napoleon's assistance, Goldsmith established the Argus, a biweekly publication in English reviewing English affairs from a French point of view.

In 1803, according to Goldsmith's own account, he was entrusted with a mission to obtain from the Comte de Provence, the head of the French royal family and subsequent King Louis XVIII, a renunciation of his claim to the throne of France in return for the throne of Poland. The offer was declined. Goldsmith says he then received instructions to kidnap Louis, or to kill him if he resisted. Instead, Goldsmith revealed the plot. Until 1807, however, when his Republican sympathies began to wane, Goldsmith continued to undertake secret service missions on behalf of Napoleon.

Goldsmith's hand has been seen in the Revolutionary Plutarch of 1804–05, an émigré work edited in London, and with a title harking back to the British Plutarch of Thomas Mortimer. That would imply that Goldsmith was by then already playing a double game.

== Anti-Napoleon ==
Goldsmith returned to England in 1809. At first he was arrested and imprisoned, but soon was released and established himself as a notary in London. By 1811 he had become strongly anti-republican, founding the Anti-Gallican Monitor and Anti-Corsican Chronicle (subsequently known as the British Monitor) through which he now denounced the French Revolution. He proposed that a price be put on Napoleon's head by public subscription, but found himself condemned by the British government. In 1810 he published Secret History of the Cabinet of Bonaparte and Recueil des manifestes, proclamations, discours, etc. de Napoleon Buonaparte (Collection of the Decrees of Napoleon Bonaparte); and in 1812 he published a Secret History of Bonaparte's Diplomacy. He claimed Napoleon then offered him 200,000 [francs?] to discontinue his attacks. In 1815, he published An Appeal to the Governments of Europe on the Necessity of Bringing Napoleon Bonaparte to a Public Trial.

== Later life ==
In 1825, he moved back to Paris, publishing his Statistics of France a few years later. His only child, Georgiana, become the second wife of John Copley, 1st Baron Lyndhurst in 1837. He died "of paralysis" after an illness lasting several months, in his home on the Rue de la Paix, Paris, on 6 January 1846.
