= Richard Birnie =

Scottish police magistrate (1760-1832)

Sir Richard Birnie (c. 1760 – 1832) was a Scottish police magistrate in London, who came to prominence for his involvement with the Cato Street Conspiracy.

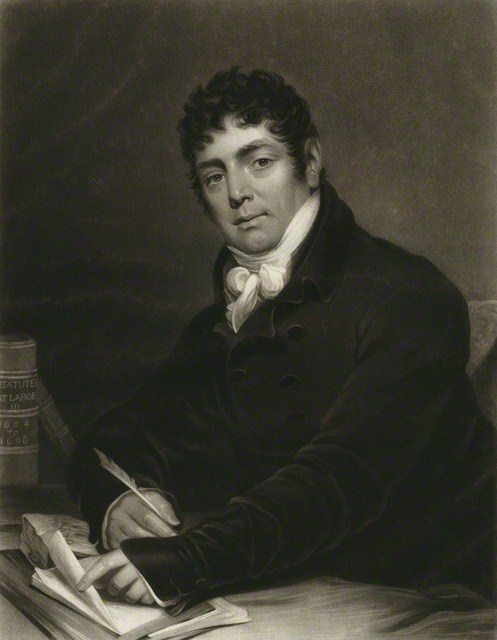
Richard Birnie, 1819 engraving by William Say after James Green.

== Life ==
He was a native of Banff, Aberdeenshire, born about 1760. After serving an apprenticeship to a saddler he came to London, and worked for the house of Macintosh & Co., in the Haymarket, saddlers and harness-makers to the royal family. In favour with the Prince of Wales (the future George IV), a favour Birnie retained until his death, he was made foreman and eventually a partner in the business; he married the daughter of a wealthy baker.

After his marriage Birnie rented a house in St Martin-in-the-Fields parish, and took part in parochial affairs. He established almshouses in Pratt Street, Camden Town. He also enrolled himself in the Royal Westminster Volunteers, in which he became a captain. At the request of the Duke of Northumberland he was placed in the commission of the peace, and began to frequent the Bow Street Magistrates' Court.

In time Birnie was appointed police magistrate at Union Hall court (which later became Southwark Police Court). After a few years he was promoted to be a magistrate at Bow Street. In February 1820 he headed the police officers in the apprehension of the Cato Street conspirators.

At the funeral of Queen Caroline in August 1821 Birnie took the initiative in reading the Riot Act, which Sir Robert Baker, the chief magistrate, refused to do. Shortly afterwards Baker resigned; he had been criticised, for example by the Tory Harriet Arbuthnot for his soft line, in the violent circumstances where there had already been deaths. Birnie was appointed to succeed him, and a knighthood was conferred on him in the September following.

In 1823, Birnie refused to enforce the unpopular Poor rate in Acton, causing it to be reduced for some householders. He died on 29 April 1832.

== Family ==
Birnie and his wife Louisa had a son Richard Birnie (1808–1888), a barrister and journalist, who emigrated to Australia in 1854.
