= Spensonia =

Spensonia is a fictional Utopian country created by the English author and political reformer Thomas Spence. Spence laid out his ideas about Spensonia in a series of literary works published in the late 18th century:

- A Supplement to the History of Robinson Crusoe (1782)
- A Marine Republic, or A Description of Spensonia (1794)
- The Constitution of a Perfect Commonwealth (1798)
- The Constitution of Spensonia: A Country in Fairyland Situated Between Utopia and Oceana (1801)
- The Receipt to Make a Millenium or Happy World (1805).

Spence issued these works in several editions, creating a complex bibliography. Since he also developed and advocated his own scheme of language reform, he released his Spensonian works in both standard spelling texts and in his own Spensonian alphabet.

Spence's utopian writings are significant in that he was the first to apply Enlightenment ideas about democracy and majority rule to the genre, and also the first to attempt a utopian response to the Industrial Revolution. Spence's utopian works "were directed explicitly at the major institutions, economic and political, of the time. In so doing he provided the model of most future utopias."

== Plot ==
Spence united these utopian writings with a frame story about shipwrecked English mariners. When a ship carrying English merchant brothers is stranded on a remote island, the brothers decide to take the arrangement they had aboard ship, the "Marine Constitution" given to them by their father, and apply it to their life on land; and so they create a commonwealth of collective ownership. The land of the island is the property of the collective, and individuals rent it for their own uses. They organize their own democratic government to manage their new social system.

Their society thrives and flourishes. Men and women are equal. Spensonia maintains cordial relations with other republics, and extends political asylum to refugees from tyranny. There is an official religion, a sort of vague deism, though all other religions are tolerated.

News of the island of Spensonia is brought back to England by a figure named Captain Swallow.
