= James Wroe =

James Wroe (1788–1844), was the only editor of the radical reformist newspaper the Manchester Observer, the journalist who named the incident known as the Peterloo massacre, and the writer of pamphlets as a result that brought about the Reform Act 1832.

== Early life ==
Wroe was born in Bradford, West Yorkshire. Trained as a woolcomber, after moving to Manchester he became involved in local politics.

== Manchester Observer ==
In 1818, Wroe, John Knight, Joseph Johnson and John Saxton formed the Manchester Observer. With Wroe as its editor, it pioneered radicalist popularist articles, and within twelve months was selling 4,000 copies per week to its local audience. By late 1819 it was being sold in most of the booming industrialised cities – Birmingham, Leeds, London, Salford – that were calling for non-conformist reform of the Houses of Parliament. However, along with Thomas John Evans and Saxton, Wroe was constantly being sued for libel, and often jailed for writing articles critical of Parliament's structure.

== Peterloo Massacre ==
At the start of 1819, Wroe, Knight, and Johnson formed the Patriotic Union Society (PUS). All the leading radicals and reformists in Manchester joined the organisation, including members of the Little Circle. At its first meeting, Johnson was appointed secretary, and Wroe became treasurer. The objective of the PUS was to obtain parliamentary reform.

PUS decided to invite Henry "Orator" Hunt and Major John Cartwright to speak at a public meeting in Manchester, about the national agenda of Parliamentary reform, and the local aim of electing two members of parliament for Manchester and one for Salford. To avoid the police or courts banning the meeting, PUS stated on all its materials as did the Observer in articles and editorial that it was "a meeting of the county of Lancashire, than of Manchester alone."

Following the massacre, Wroe as editor of the Observer was the first journalist to describe the incident as the Peterloo massacre, taking his headline from the Battle of Waterloo that had taken place only four years before. Wroe subsequently wrote pamphlets entitled "The Peterloo Massacre: A Faithful Narrative of the Events". Priced at 2d each, they sold out each print run for 14 weeks, having a large national circulation.

== Closure of the Observer, jail ==
The government instigated repeated prosecutions of the Manchester Observer and those associated with it. Vendors of the Manchester Observer were prosecuted for seditious libel, and a total of fifteen charges of seditious libel were brought against Wroe, his wife and his two brothers. Publication of the Observer was temporarily suspended in February 1820, when Wroe relinquished ownership of the publication, but resumed under the last proprietor of the Observer, Thomas John Evans.

At trial, Wroe was found guilty on two specimen charges, while all the other charges against him, his wife, and his brothers were allowed to lie undetermined, provided the publication of libels ceased. On one charge he was sentenced to six months imprisonment and fined £100; on the other he was given a further six months and bound over to keep the peace for two years, to give a surety of £200, and to find two other sureties of £50 each. The specimen charges related not to anything in the Observer, but to articles in Sherwin's Weekly Political Register, which Wroe had sold. The sentences were said to have been reduced because of the distressed state of the Wroes.

In June 1821, Wroe's successor, T. J. Evans, was convicted on one charge of seditious libel printed in the Observer and another of libel on a private individual. He was imprisoned for eighteen months and bound over for three years in the sum of £400, with two other sureties of £200 to be found. By then, the Manchester Observer had ceased publication, its final editorial recommending its readers to read the recently founded Manchester Guardian.

== Later life ==
Wroe became a bookseller in Great Ancoats Street, where he sold radical books and newspapers. He served on the police committee of Manchester (the predecessor of the town council) and was active in vestry politics: in 1834 he was presented with a piece of silver plate for his unceasing efforts on behalf of rate-payers. His politics remained Radical; in the political crisis of 1834 he held the Whigs and the Tories to be equally bad (the Manchester Times retorting that the Tories had driven him out of business and imprisoned him for a year; the worst that Wroe could say of the Whigs was that they had not been sufficiently solicitous for his wife whilst he was imprisoned).

In 1837, Wroe objected to the Manchester, South Junction and Altrincham Railway crossing the town by a viaduct passing close to Castlefield, which was a venue for public meetings: if there was a tyrannical government and the people of Manchester held a public meeting, "all that the military would have to do was to put their cannon on top of the railway and fire on the people." Wroe was prominent in the opposition to the incorporation of Manchester, and in 1838 he was chosen as one of Manchester's delegates to the first Chartist National Convention, but he does not appear to have attended it.

Wroe died in August 1844, his widow being "left in very embarrassed pecuniary circumstances of distress".
