= James Watson (Spencean) =

British radical

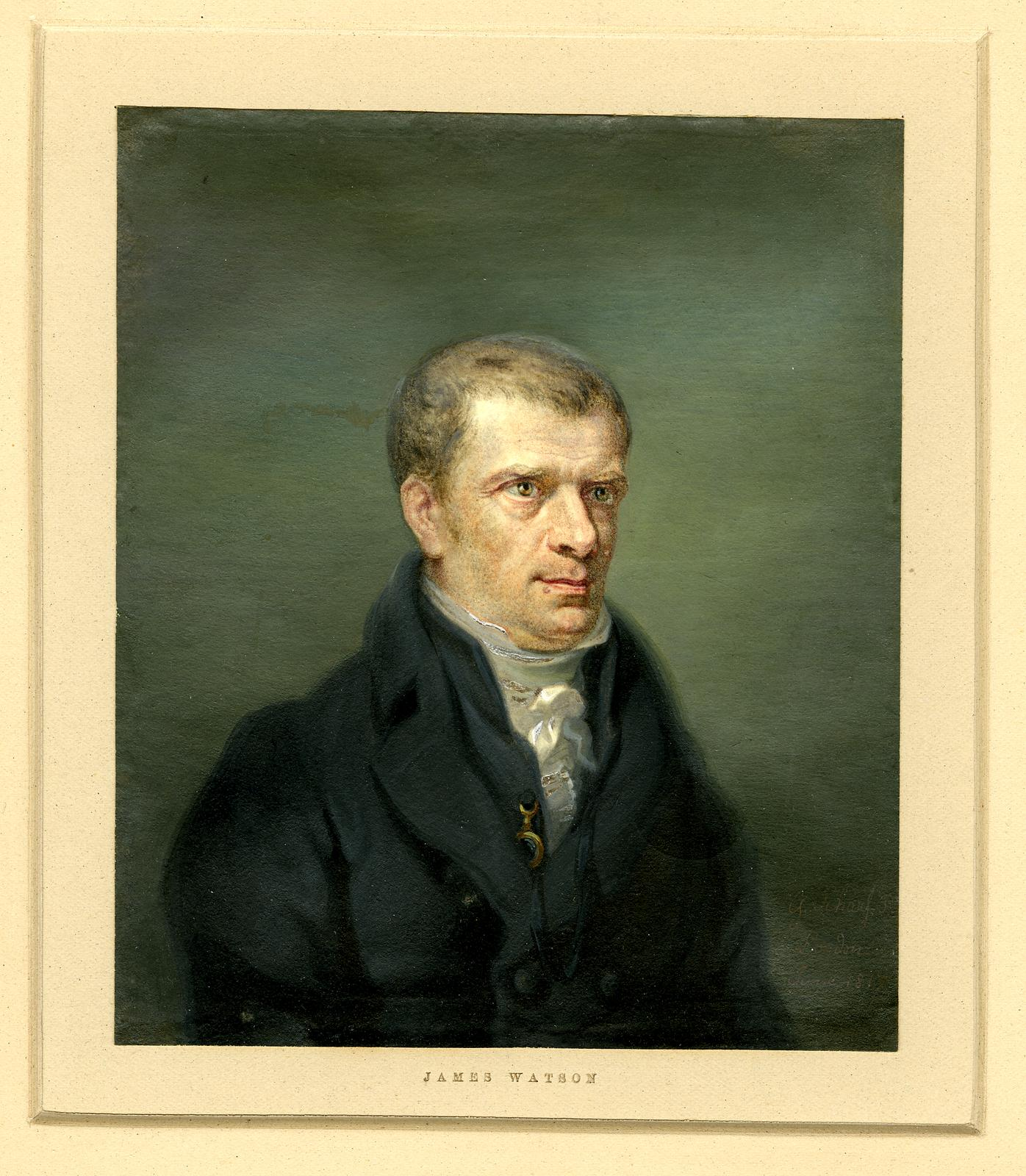
- Born: c. 1766
- Died: 12 February 1838; New York, United States
- Occupation: Radical

James Watson (c. 1766 – 12 February 1838) was a British radicalism activist and prominent member of the Spencean movement, which opposed private land ownership and championed social reform. Possibly of Scottish origin, Watson received his medical training in Edinburgh before moving to London, where he worked as a surgeon, chemist, or apothecary. In the capital, he became involved with the Spencean Philanthropists, a group inspired by the ideas of Thomas Spence that promoted "parochial partnership" and communal land ownership. His activities during the turbulent post-Napoleonic Wars era included organizing meetings and conspiracies aimed at challenging the established political order.

== Early life and education ==
James Watson was born around 1766, probably of Scottish origin. Early evidence of his medical training is found in the 1787 publication of his "Dissertatio Inauguralis Medica de Amenorrhea" in Edinburgh.

== Medical career ==
After completing his studies in Edinburgh, Watson moved to London. By 1817 he was officially described as a surgeon in the Bloomsbury area, although some accounts also refer to him as a chemist and apothecary, noting that he maintained only a modest practice while living in impoverished circumstances.

== Involvement with the Spencean Philanthropists ==
Watson became actively involved with the Spencean Philanthropists, a radical group established around 1814 by Thomas Evans and inspired by the ideas of Thomas Spence. The group, opposed to private land ownership and advocating for "parochial partnership," met weekly in London taverns—most notably at the Cock on Grafton Street in Soho. Watson participated in these meetings alongside his son, who shared his name and political engagement.

== Revolutionary activities ==
In the social unrest following the Napoleonic Wars, Watson and his associates organized secret meetings—one significant gathering occurring at Spa Fields in Islington. They prepared for revolutionary actions by fabricating pikes and combustible materials aimed at military installations such as the cavalry barracks at Portman Square. However, their efforts were stymied when government spy John Castle infiltrated the group.

== See also ==
- Spa Fields riots
