= Spa Fields riots =

1816 incidents in England

The Spa Fields riots were incidents of public disorder arising out of the second of two mass meetings at Spa Fields, Islington, England on 15 November and 2 December 1816.

The meetings had been planned by a small group of revolutionary Spenceans, who invited the popular radical speaker Henry Hunt to address the crowd. They hoped that the meetings would be followed by rioting, during which they would seize control of the government by taking the Tower of London and the Bank of England. The first meeting ended peacefully, with Hunt being elected to deliver a petition to the Prince Regent, requesting electoral reform and relief from hardship and distress. At the second meeting some of the Spenceans harangued the crowd before Hunt arrived and led away a section of it. The rioters raided a gunsmith's shop and exchanged gunfire with troops at the Royal Exchange. Other incidents took place at Snow Hill and Minories, but after soldiers refused to hand over the Tower of London the rioters dispersed.

In the aftermath of the riots, four leading Spenceans, John Hooper, Thomas Preston, Arthur Thistlewood and James Watson, were arrested and charged with high treason. Watson was tried first and the chief prosecution witness was John Castle, a government spy who had infiltrated the Spenceans. Castle's evidence was discredited by defence counsel and Watson was acquitted, at which point the prosecution presented no evidence against the other defendants and all four were released.

== Background ==
The ending of the Napoleonic Wars in 1815 led to a sharp downturn in the British economy, bringing mass unemployment and distress. Radical leaders in London had organised petitions calling for parliament to relieve distress, but without success, and the Spenceans thought that more extreme action was needed. They called a mass public meeting at Spa Fields for 15 November 1816, with the object of marching to the Prince Regent's house to deliver their demands, which included universal (male) suffrage, annual parliaments, secret ballots and redistribution of land. They invited several leading radical speakers to attend, but Hunt was the only one to agree, and when he met the organisers prior to the meeting he persuaded them not to march to the house and to moderate their demands by dropping land reform. Hunt was a very popular speaker and the meeting was attended by around 10,000 people. He prevented any departure from the agreed plan and the meeting passed off peacefully, with Hunt and Sir Francis Burdett being elected to deliver the petition. However, when Hunt proposed that the meeting be adjourned until parliament next sat, Watson's son, also called James Watson, persuaded the crowd to support the earlier date of 2 December. Young Watson, Thistlewood and some of the other Spenceans had only reluctantly agreed to Hunt's terms for the first meeting and wanted the second to end in riots.

== Rioting ==
Hunt made two attempts to present the petition to the Prince Regent (without Burdett, who had declined to participate) but had been refused admittance. Meanwhile, the Spenceans advertised the second meeting with a number of inflammatory handbills, including one which quoted Lord Nelson at the Battle of Trafalgar in 1805:

ENGLAND
Expects every Man to do his Duty
___________________________
The Meeting in Spa Fields
Takes Place at 12 o'clock
On Monday, December 2nd. 1816
To receive the answer of the PETITION to the PRINCE REGENT,
determined upon at the last meeting held in the same place,
and for other important Considerations
THE PRESENT STATE OF GREAT BRITAIN
Four Millions in Distress !!!
Four Millions Embarrassed !!!
One Million-and-half fear Distress !!!
Half-a-million live in splendid Luxury !!!
Death would now be a relief to Millions –
Arrogance, Folly, and Crimes – have brought affairs to this dread Crisis.
Firmness and Integrity
can only save the Country!!!

On 2 December another large crowd assembled in Spa Fields to hear Hunt. Before he arrived, however, both Watsons harangued the crowd and Watson junior picked up a tricolour flag, symbol of the French Revolution, and led off a section in the direction of the Tower. Most of the crowd stayed behind to listen to Hunt and the meeting passed off without incident.

The rioters, 'insurrectionary elements among the Jacobins of the London tavern world' robbed a gunsmith's shop in Snow Hill, during which shots were fired, the gunsmith wounded and a passer-by killed. At the Royal Exchange troops closed the gates and exchanged shots with the rioters. Further skirmishes took place at Fleet Market, Snow Hill and the Minories, which the rioters took under control for some hours. From there, Thistlewood led an armed band to the Tower of London, climbed a wall and invited the soldiers to surrender. They refused and the most serious public disturbance in London since the Gordon Riots of 1780 gradually petered out.

== Arrests and trials ==
Watson was arrested on the evening of 2 December, but his son and Thistlewood escaped. Young Watson fled to the United States but Thistlewood was arrested as he tried to escape on a boat at Gravesend. Hooper and John Cashman, a sailor, had been arrested during the Royal Exchange skirmish. Cashman was found guilty of theft of firearms and hanged on 12 March 1817. Hooper was acquitted but subsequently re-arrested and charged with high treason, along with Watson senior, Thistlewood and Preston. Young Watson's name was included on the charge sheet.

Watson was tried first and the hearing took over a week. The chief prosecution witness was Castle, who had been on the organising committee for both meetings. Hunt appeared as a defence witness and accused Castle of trying to make him commit treasonable acts on at least two occasions. Defence counsel exposed previous instances where Castle had entrapped others into committing crimes and, without naming him as a spy, presented him to the jury as an agent provocateur. The jury accepted the defence's case and Watson was found not guilty. No further evidence was presented against the other defendants and they were also acquitted.

== Aftermath ==
The riots marked the start of a period of mass anti-government meetings, marches and riots, including the subsequent march of the Blanketeers (March 1817), the Pentrich rising (June 1817) and the Peterloo Massacre (August 1819) and ending only after the failure of the Cato Street Conspiracy (February 1820) and the Radical War in Scotland later that year.
