= Arthur Thistlewood =

English radical activist and conspirator (1774-1820)

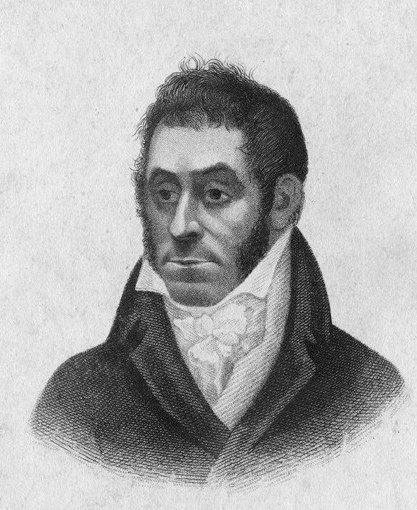
Arthur Thistlewood.

Arthur Thistlewood (1774–1 May 1820) was an English radical activist and conspirator in the Cato Street Conspiracy. He planned to murder the cabinet of the UK parliament; however, a spy betrayed the plan and Thistlewood was apprehended with 12 other conspirators. He killed a policeman during the raid. He was executed for treason.

== Early life ==
He was born in Tupholme in Lincolnshire, the extramarital son of a farmer and stockbreeder. He attended Horncastle Grammar School and was trained as a land surveyor. Unsatisfied with his job, he obtained a commission in the army at the age of 21.

In January 1804, he married Jane Worsley but she died two years later giving birth to their first child. In 1808 he married Susan Wilkinson. He then quit his commission in the army and, with the help of his father, bought a farm. The farm was not a success and in 1811 he moved to London.

Thistlewood was the nephew of Thomas Thistlewood (1721‒1786), a British-born slave owner and plantation overseer in colonial Jamaica.

== Beginning of revolutionary involvement ==
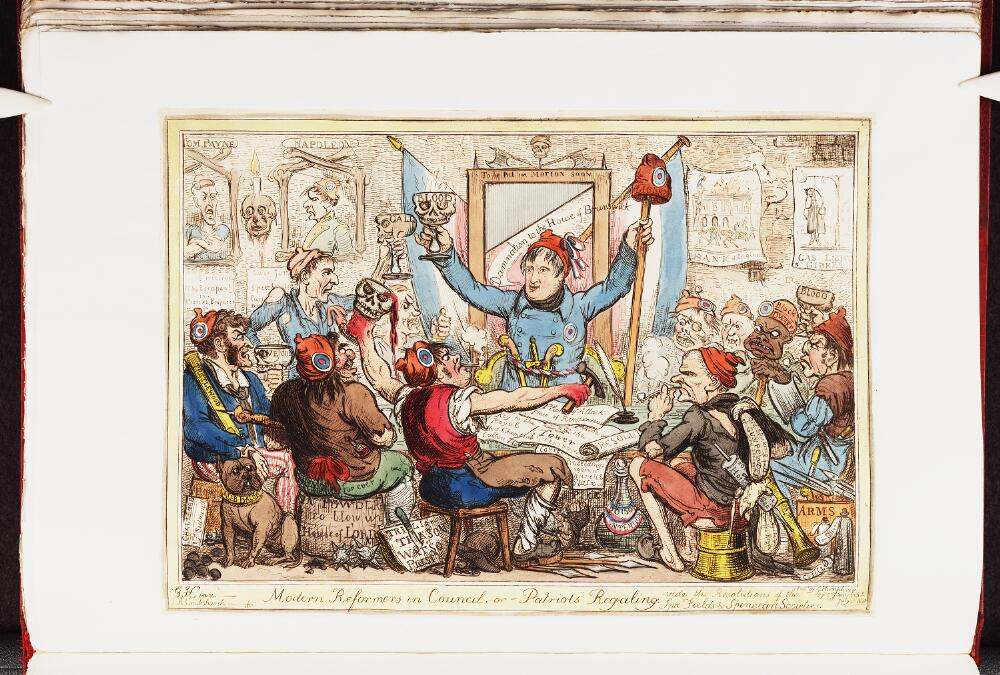
Modern reformers in council.

Travel in France and the United States exposed Thistlewood to revolutionary ideas. Shortly after his return to England, he joined the Society of Spencean Philanthropists in London. By 1816, Thistlewood had become a leader in the organisation, and was labelled a "dangerous character" by police, who watched him closely.

== Spa Fields ==
On 2 December 1816, a mass meeting took place at Spa Fields. The Spenceans had planned to encourage rioting all across England and then seize control of the British government by taking the Tower of London and the Bank of England. Police learned of the plan and dispersed the meeting. Thistlewood attempted to flee to North America.

He and three other leaders were arrested and charged with high treason. When James Watson was acquitted, the authorities released Thistlewood and the others as well.

In 1817 Thistlewood challenged the Home Secretary, Lord Sidmouth, to a duel and was imprisoned in Horsham jail for 12 months.

== Cato Street Conspiracy ==
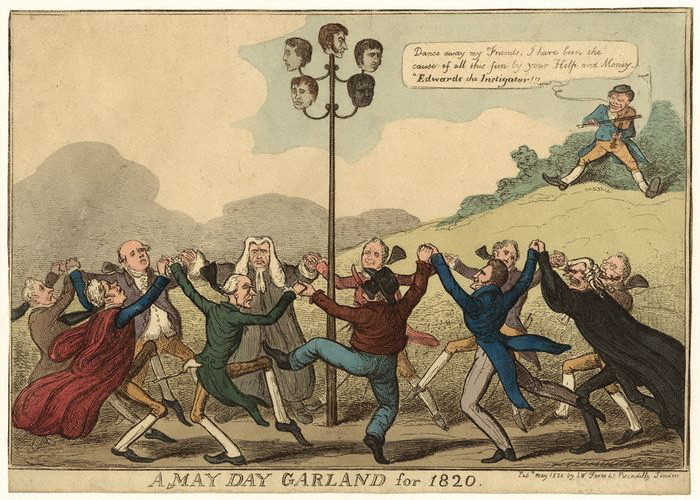
A May Day Garland for 1820.

On 22 February 1820 Thistlewood was one of a small group of Spenceans who decided, at the prompting of an undercover police agent George Edwards, to assassinate the British cabinet at a dinner the next day hosted by an earl. The group gathered in a loft in the Marylebone area of London, where police officers apprehended the conspirators. Edwards, a police spy, had fabricated the story of the dinner. Thistlewood was convicted of treason for his part in the Cato Street Conspiracy and, together with co-conspirators John Thomas Brunt, William Davidson, John Ings and Richard Tidd, was publicly hanged and decapitated outside Newgate Prison on 1 May 1820.
