= Thomas Spence =

English Radical (1750–1814)

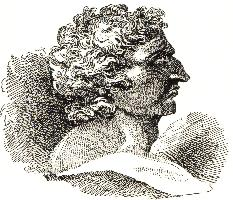
Thomas Spence

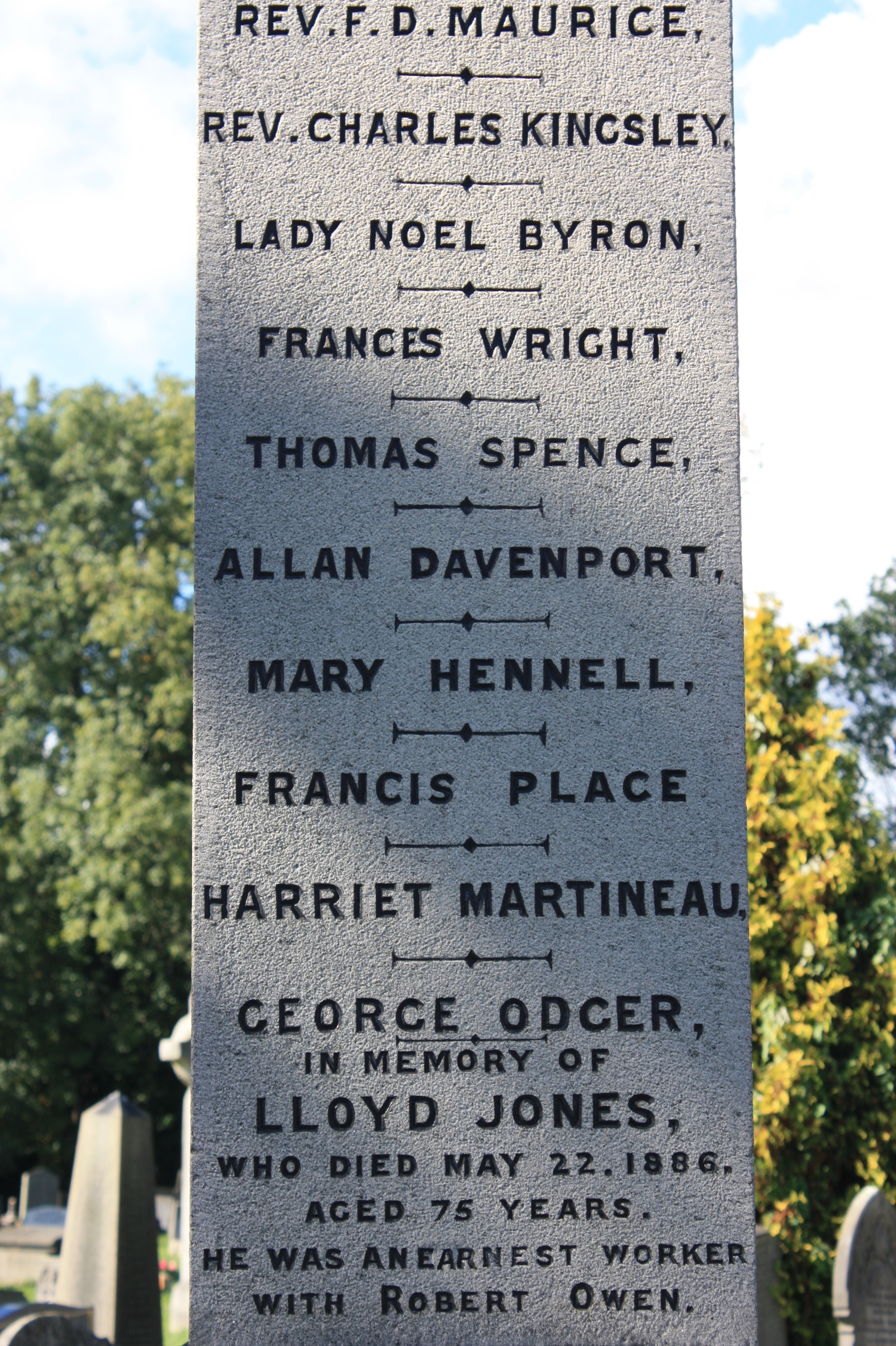
Base of the Reformers Memorial, Kensal Green Cemetery, showing Spence's name

Thomas Spence (2 July [O.S. 21 June] 1750 – 8 September 1814) was an English Radical and advocate of the common ownership of land and a democratic equality of the sexes. Spence was one of the leading revolutionaries of the late 18th and early 19th centuries. He was born in poverty and died the same way, after long periods of imprisonment, in 1814.

== Life ==
Born in 1750 to a Presbyterian family, Spence later left Newcastle for London in 1787. He kept a book-stall in High Holborn. In 1794, with other members of the London Corresponding Society, he spent seven months in Newgate Gaol on a charge of high treason, and in 1801 he was sentenced to twelve months' imprisonment for seditious libel. He died in London on 8 September 1814.

== Land reform and Spence's Plan ==
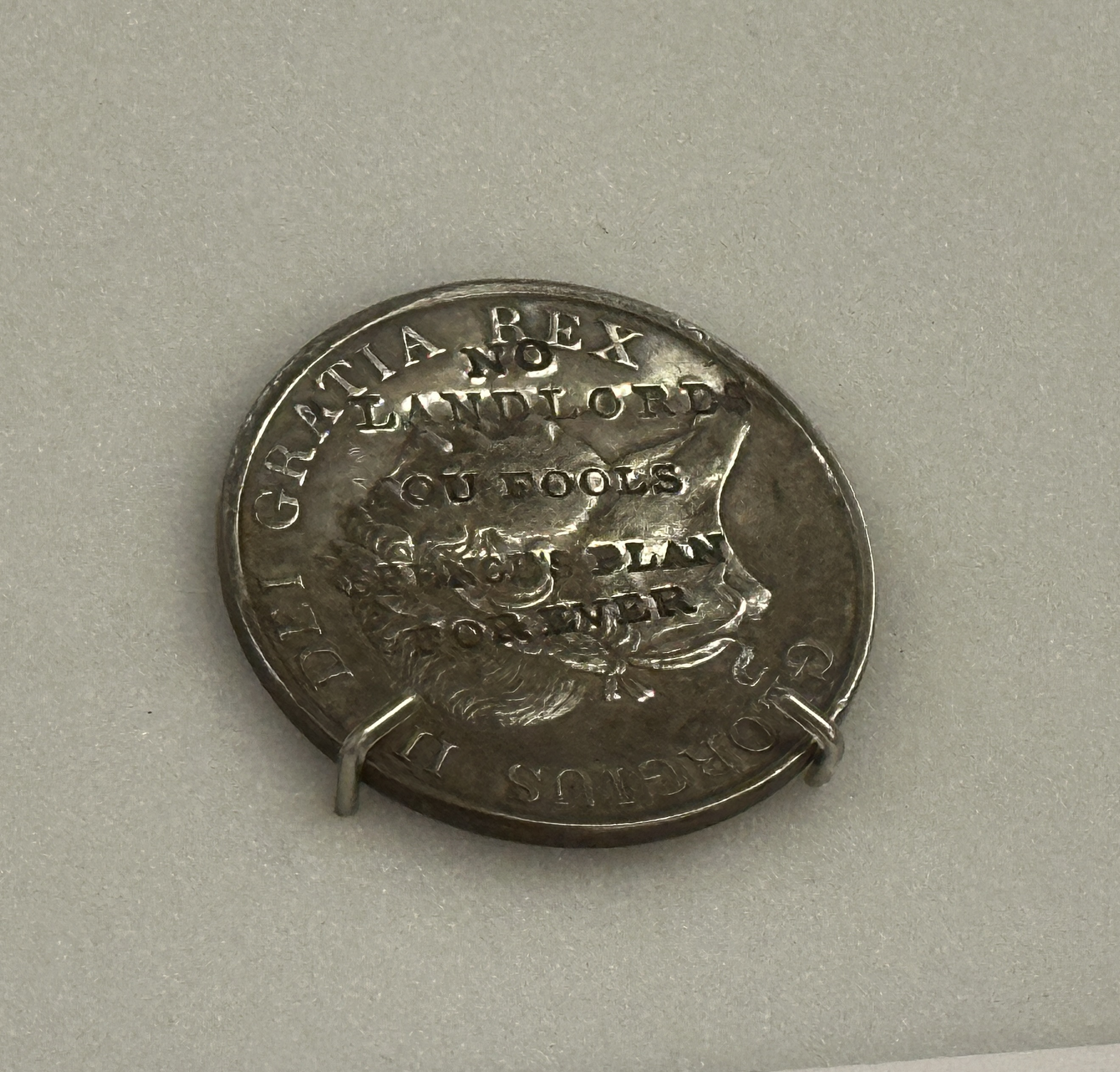
Defaced 1813 three shillings coin promoting Spence's Plan. Added text reads: "NO LANDLORDS / YOU FOOLS / SPENCE'S PLAN / FOREVER".

The threatened enclosure of the common land known as Town Moor in Newcastle in 1771 appears to have been key to Spence's interest in the land question and journey towards ultra-radicalism. His scheme was not for land nationalization but for the establishment of self-contained parochial communities, in which rent paid to the parish (wherein the absolute ownership of the land was vested) should be the only tax of any kind. Rents collected would fund schools, hospitals, courts and roads, with the remainder distributed equally among every resident in the parish. His ideas and thinking on the subject were shaped by a variety of economic thinkers, including his friend Charles Hall.

At the centre of Spence's work was his plan, which argued for:

1. The end of aristocracy and landlords;
2. All land should be publicly owned by 'democratic parishes', which should be largely self-governing;
3. Rents of land in parishes to be shared equally amongst parishioners, as a form of social dividend;
4. Universal suffrage (including female suffrage) at both parish level and through a system of deputies elected by parishes to a national senate;
5. A 'social guarantee' extended to provide income for those unable to work;
6. The 'rights of infants' [children] to be free from abuse and poverty.

Spence's Plan was first published in his penny pamphlet Property in Land Every One's Right in 1775. It was re-issued as The Real Rights of Man in later editions. It was also reissued by, amongst others, Henry Hyndman under the title of The Nationalization of the Land in 1795 and 1882.

Spence explored his political and social concepts in a series of books about the fictional utopian state of Spensonia.

== "Rights of man" ==
Spence may have been the first Englishman to speak of 'the rights of man'. The following recollection, composed in the third person, was written by Spence while he was in prison in London in 1794 on a charge of high treason. Spence was, he wrote,

the first, who as far as he knows, made use of the phrase "RIGHTS OF MAN", which was on the following remarkable occasion: A man who had been a farmer, and also a miner, and who had been ill-used by his landlords, dug a cave for himself by the seaside, at Marsdon Rocks, between Shields and Sunderland, about the year 1780, and the singularity of such a habitation, exciting the curiosity of many to pay him a visit; our author was one of that number. Exulting in the idea of a human being, who had bravely emancipated himself from the iron fangs of aristocracy, to live free from impost, he wrote extempore with chaulk above the fire place of this free man, the following lines:

Ye landlords vile, whose man's peace mar,
Come levy rents here if you can;
Your stewards and lawyers I defy,
And live with all the RIGHTS OF MAN

This is in reference to the story of "Jack the Blaster" at Marsden Grotto.

He used the term "rights of man" in 1776 and then in a lecture given in 1793.

== Spelling reform ==
Spence was a self-taught radical with a deep regard for education as a means to liberation. He pioneered a phonetic script and pronunciation system designed to allow people to learn reading and pronunciation at the same time. He believed that if the correct pronunciation was visible in the spelling, everyone would pronounce English correctly, and the class distinctions carried by language would cease. This, he imagined, would bring a time of equality, peace and plenty: the millennium. He published the first English dictionary with pronunciations (1775) and made phonetic versions of many of his pamphlets.

Examples of Spence's spelling system can be seen on the pages on English from the Spence Society.

== Rights of children ==
Spence published The Rights of Infants in 1797 as a response to Thomas Paine's Agrarian Justice. In this essay Spence proposes the introduction of an unconditional basic income (UBI) to all members of the community. His proposal is the oldest known UBI proposal. Such allowance would be financed through the socialization of land and the benefits of the rents received by each municipality. Everyone’s property would be taxed to ensure that no one had to go without anything.

Spence's essay also expresses a clear commitment to the rights of women, although he appears unaware of Mary Wollstonecraft's 1792 Vindication of the Rights of Woman.

== Memorial and legacy ==
Spence is listed on the Reformers Memorial in Kensal Green Cemetery in London.

His admirers formed a "Society of Spencean Philanthropists," of which some account is given in Harriet Martineau's England During the Thirty Years' Peace. The African Caribbean activists William Davidson and Robert Wedderburn were drawn to this political group.

Members of the Society of Spencean Philanthropists (including Arthur Thistlewood) maintained contacts with United Irish exiles in Paris, notably with the veteran conspirator William Putnam McCabe, and were implicated in the Spa Field riots of 1816 and the Cato Street Conspiracy of 1820. Spenceans were outlawed in 1817.

Thomas Spence is recognized today as one of the founders of the movement for a Universal Basic Income.

== Selected publications ==
- A Supplement to the History of Robinson Crusoe (1782) (utopian novel)
- The Real Rights of Man (1793)
- End of Oppression (1795)
- Rights of Infants (1796)
- Constitution of Spensonia (1801) (utopian fiction)
- The Important Trial of Thomas Spence (1807)
- Giant Killer or Anti-Landlord (1814)

== See also ==
- Georgism, an economic philosophy holding that economic value derived from land should belong equally to all members of society.
- List of 18th-century British working-class writers
- Rights of Man
