= Burdett (surname) =

Burdett is a surname. Notable people with the surname include:

- Colin Burdett (1931–2025), Australian basketball player
- Francis Burdett (1743–1794), English aristocrat
- Francis Burdett, 5th Baronet (1770–1844), English politician
- George Burdett (disambiguation), multiple people
- Henry Burdett (1847–1920), English financier and philanthropist
- John Burdett (born 1951), British crime novelist
- Peter Perez Burdett (c. 1734–1793), English cartographer, surveyor, artist, and draughtsman
- Ricky Burdett (born 1956), Professor of Urban Studies
- Thomas Burdett (disambiguation), multiple people
- William Burdett, founded Alvecote Priory

== See also ==
- Burdett baronets
- Christiana Burdett Campbell, (ca. 1723–1792) Colonial American innkeeper
- Lew Burdette, major league baseball player, 2-time All-Star
