= Burdett Coutts (disambiguation) =

Burdett Coutts (1919–2016) was a Singaporean field hockey player.

Burdett-Coutts may refer to:

- Angela Burdett-Coutts, 1st Baroness Burdett-Coutts (1814–1906), English philanthropist
- William Burdett-Coutts (1851–1921), American-born British politician
- William Burdett-Coutts (promoter), Zimbabwean theatrical promoter

== See also ==
- Burdett (disambiguation)
- Coutts (disambiguation)
