= Burdette =

Burdette may refer to:

- Burdette (name), a list of people with the given name or surname
- "Big Enos" and "Little Enos" Burdette, characters in the 1980 film Smokey and the Bandit II
- Burdette, a character on It's a Big Big World, an American children's television series
- Burdette, Arkansas, United States, a town
- Burdette, West Virginia, United States, an unincorporated community
- Burdette Building, Simpsonville, South Carolina, United States, on the National Register of Historic Places
- Burdette Park, Vanderburgh County, Indiana, United States, a municipal park

== See also ==
- Burdett (disambiguation)
