= The Johnson Gang =

Group of Romanichal criminals

Johnson Gang
- Years active: 1988-2008
- Territory: England
- Ethnicity: Romanichal
- Membership: 5 members
- Activities: theft

The Johnson Gang is the collective name for a group of Romanichal criminals from Cheltenham, Gloucestershire, who specialised in stealing fine art and antiques from English country houses over a period of 20 years. The goods they stole are estimated to be worth between £30 million and £80 million. The gang were sentenced to a total of 49 years in prison in August 2008.

The gang comprised Ricky Johnson (born 1954), his sons Richard "Chad" Johnson (born 1975) and Albi Johnson (born 1983), Daniel O'Loughlin (born 1976 and the nephew of Ricky Johnson), and Michael Nicholls (born 1979) the boyfriend of Ricky Johnson's daughter. In addition to the thefts from stately homes the gang were involved in thefts from shops, cash machines, and metal merchants.

In 2005, the BBC made a documentary about the family called Summer with the Johnsons, in which they spoke about their love of such pursuits as hare coursing and bare-knuckle boxing. They denied having burgled any country homes, but Ricky Johnson said:

I would like to make it clear to the people out there, to the police and the rich people ... if I feel the need when I have got to rob a stately home, I will do so. I will rob it and hope I don't get caught. But I will only rob your house if I feel the need and I have got to feed my children and nobody is helping me achieve my goal. I feel I have got the fucking right to rob the lords, the sirs and the ladies.

== Crimes ==
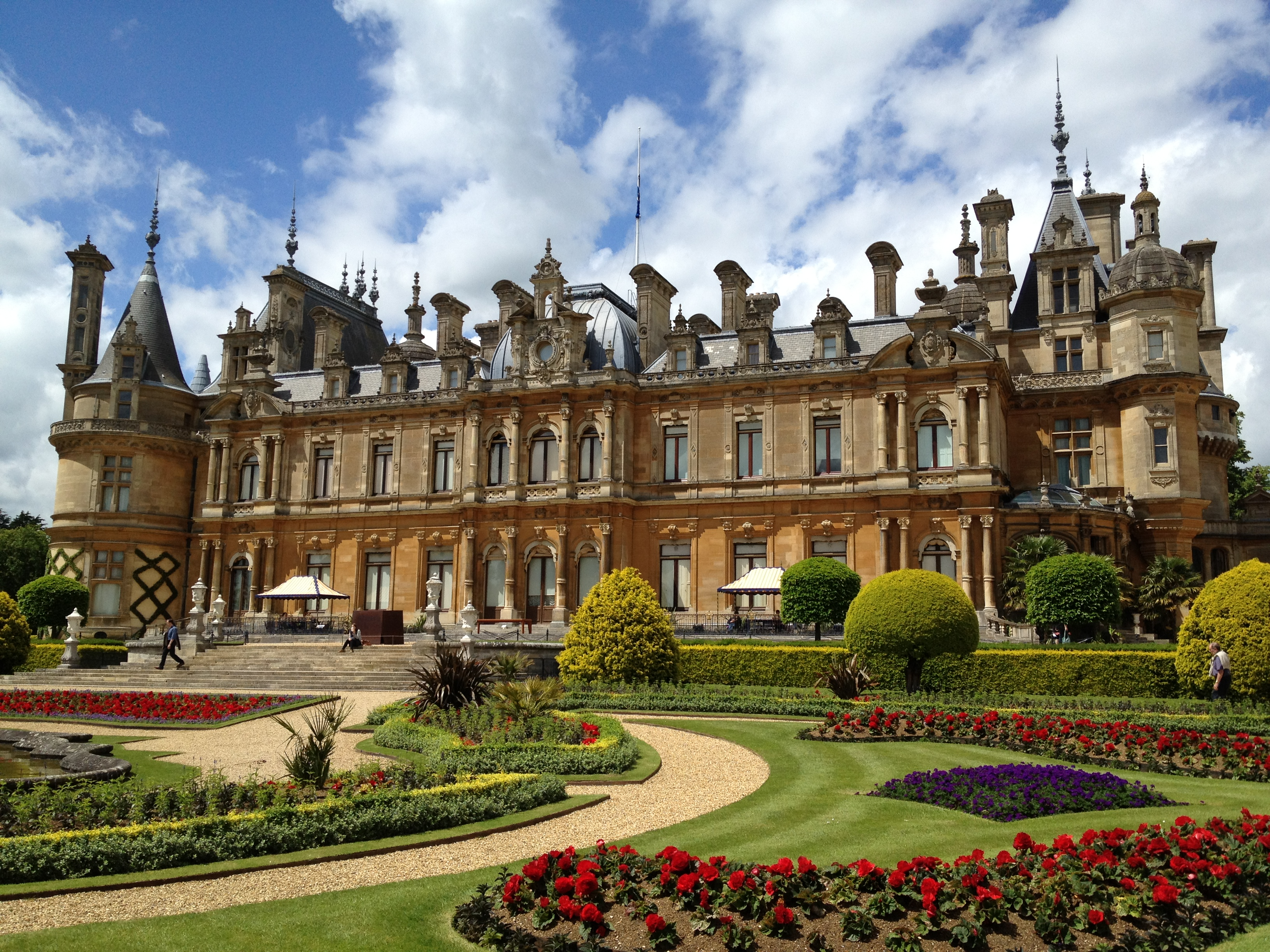
Waddesdon Manor, where over £5 million of antiques were stolen in June 2003

The gang are believed to have been operating for a period of more than 20 years. The most spectacular and lucrative thefts occurred in a period between April 2003 and June 2006. The gang staked out properties for several weeks before the crimes and used 4x4 vehicles to ram heavily bolted gates.

Notable thefts include Waddesdon Manor on 10 June 2003, a National Trust property and former Rothschild family residence near Aylesbury in Buckinghamshire. Goods including 100 antique gold snuff boxes worth around £5 million were stolen. These boxes belonged to a charity that belonged to the Rothschild family. One small sweet-box from this theft was identified at auction and recovered in 2021.

On 24 October 2005, Warneford Place in Sevenhampton, Wiltshire, the home of Formula One motor racing tycoon Paddy McNally, and the former home of James Bond creator Ian Fleming, was burgled and items worth £750,000 were taken. The thieves removed heavy steel bars from the drawing room windows and bypassed the manor's security system.

On 1 February 2006, the gang perpetrated their biggest theft when they burgled Ramsbury Manor, the home of Harry Hyams, near Marlborough in Wiltshire. The theft is believed to be the largest domestic burglary in the United Kingdom. Prosecutor Paul Reid said that:

This has been described as the most valuable domestic burglary ever committed in this country. The collection is described as priceless. There is a difficulty in putting a value on antiques and antiquities – some of them very precious and very rare – but it is tens of millions of pounds.

== Investigation and convictions ==
In October 2005, the police forces of Gloucestershire, Thames Valley, Warwickshire, and West Mercia pooled their resources under the name "Operation Haul". The police spent weeks examining CCTV footage, mobile phone records and images from speed cameras as they investigated 116 offences ranging from country house burglaries to cash dispenser thefts. In April 2006, detectives discovered an underground bunker at a field owned by an associate of the Johnsons near Stratford-upon-Avon. Inside were a number of black bins containing straw and porcelain which was linked to the Ramsbury Manor burglary.

Police arrested Ricky Johnson and Daniel O'Loughlin in June 2006 for the theft of metals worth £360,000. They were convicted at Bristol along with eight other associates in September 2007. They and the rest of the gang were charged with the other burglaries in October 2006. They were found guilty of conspiracy to commit burglary in August 2008 following a month-long trial at Reading Crown Court. Richard "Chad" Johnson and Daniel O'Loughlin, were both jailed for 11 years; Michael Nicholls was given 10 years; Albi Johnson, aged 25, was jailed for nine years; and Ricky Johnson was given eight years.

Despite the convictions, antiques worth tens of millions of pounds have yet to be recovered. Passing sentence, Judge Christopher Critchlow said: "Little of the property has been recovered and is no doubt well hidden in the countryside or passed on for disposal." Since the arrests only three items have been recovered: two clocks, including a Benjamin Vulliamy bracket clock which aroused the suspicions of an auctioneer; and a 17th-century portrait by Abraham van Diepenbeck, stolen from Ramsbury, which was found in May 2008.

Since the arrests in 2006, Thames Valley Police have seen a 90 per cent reduction in offences attributable to the group, and across all areas there has been a dramatic decrease in country house burglaries, and in cash machine and metal thefts.
