= Burdette (name) =

Burdette is both a surname and a given name. Notable people with the name include:

== Surname ==
- Blake Burdette (born 1980), American rugby union player and coach
- Clara Burdette (1855–1954), American clubwoman and philanthropist
- Erin Burdette (born 1983), American former tennis player
- Floyd Burdette (1914–1995), American college basketball player and head coach
- Freddie Burdette (1936–2010), American Major League Baseball pitcher
- Hattie Elizabeth Burdette (1872–1955), American painter
- Keith Burdette, American politician
- Kevin Burdette, American operatic bass
- Lew Burdette (1926–2007), American Major League Baseball pitcher
- Lindsay Burdette (born 1988), American tennis player
- Mallory Burdette (born 1981), American tennis player
- Matthew Burdette (born 1992), American rapper, singer, songwriter, and record producer better known as Blxst
- Nicole Burdette (born 1963), American playwright and actress
- Robert Jones Burdette (1844–1914), American humorist

== Given name ==
- Burdette Haldorson (1934–2023), American basketball player
- Burdette Johnson (1885–1947), American numismatist
- Burdette Keeland (1926–2000), American architect and professor
- Burdette Solum (1927–2012), American politician
