= Sir Robert Burdett, 4th Baronet =

British politician (1716–1797)

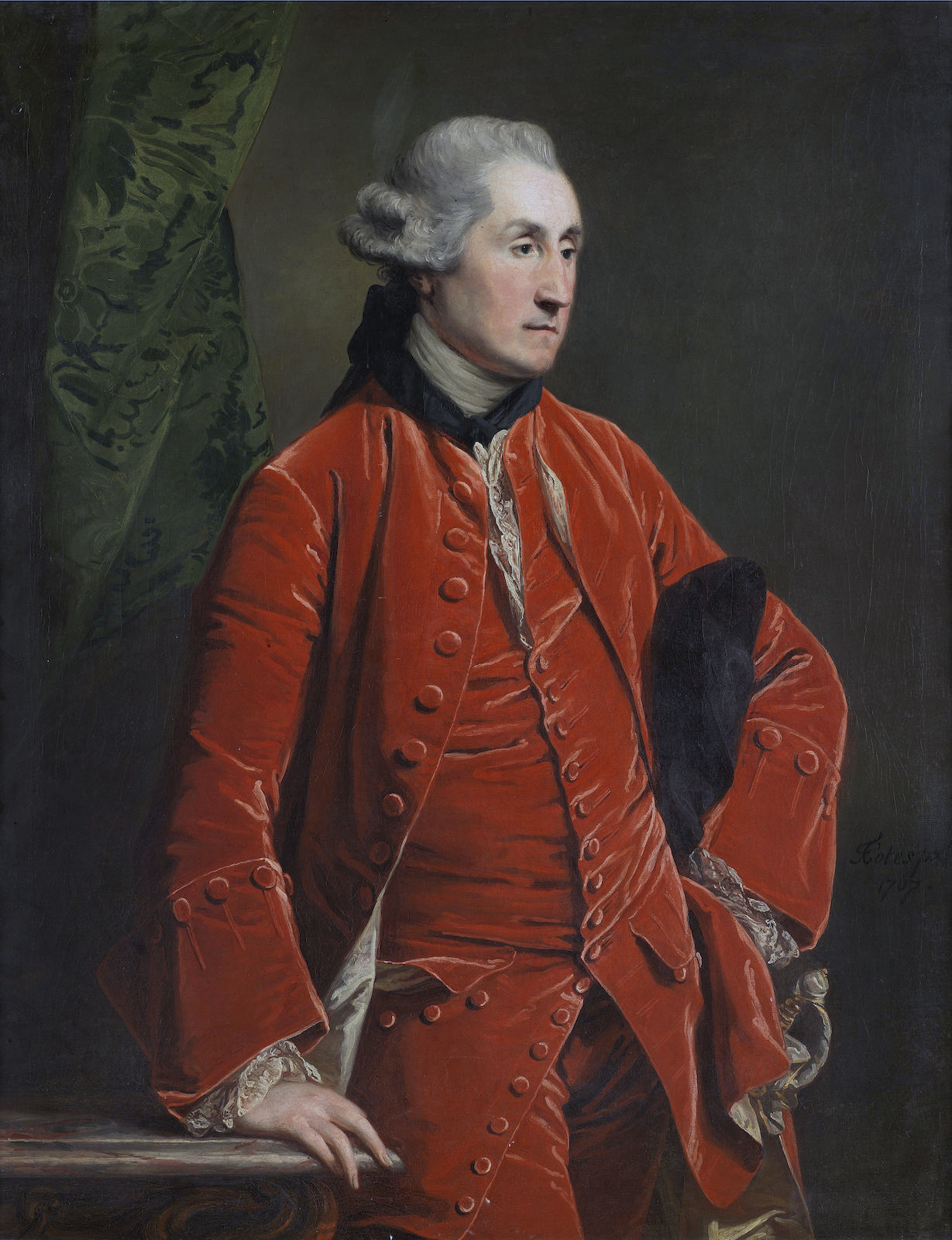
Sir Robert Francis Burdett, 4th Baronet, portrait by Francis Cotes, 1767)

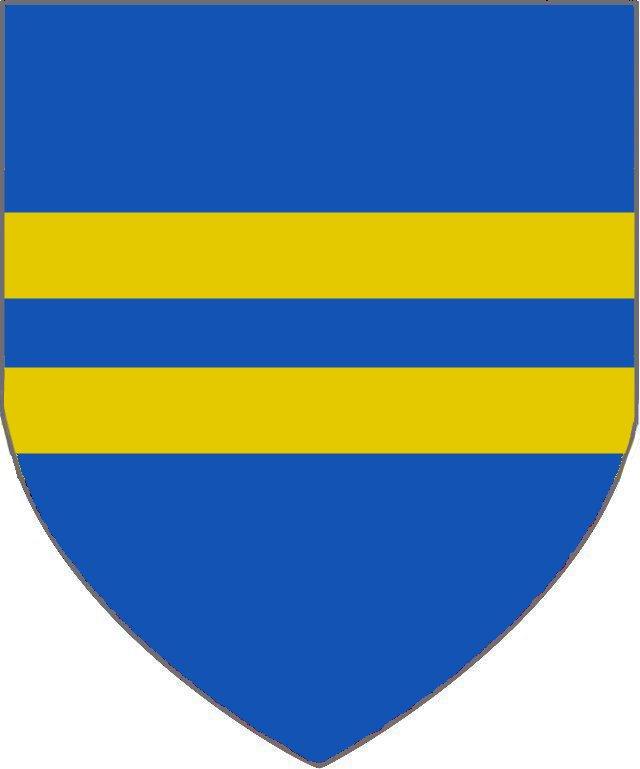
Arms of Burdett of Bramcote: Azure, two bars or (arms of their ancestor Sir William Burdet (died pre-1309) of Lowesby in Leicestershire)

Sir Robert Burdett, 4th Baronet (28 May 1716 – 13 February 1797) was a British politician and member of the English gentry.

Burdett was the posthumous son of Robert Burdett, son of Sir Robert Burdett, 3rd Baronet of Bramcote, Warwickshire. His mother was the Hon. Elizabeth, daughter of William Tracy, 4th Viscount Tracy. His father and grandfather both died in January 1716 and Burdett succeeded in the baronetcy at his birth in May 1716, four months after the death of his grandfather. He was educated as a gentleman commoner at Winchester College (around 1731), then New College, Oxford.

In 1738 he served as High Sheriff of Derbyshire. In 1748 he was returned to Parliament as one of two representatives for Tamworth, a seat he held until 1768.

Burdett married firstly Elizabeth, daughter of Sir Charles Sedley, in 1739 and by her had 3 sons and 2 daughters. After her death in 1747 he married secondly Lady Caroline, daughter of John Manners, 2nd Duke of Rutland, and widow of Sir Henry Harpur, 5th Baronet, in 1753. She died in 1769.

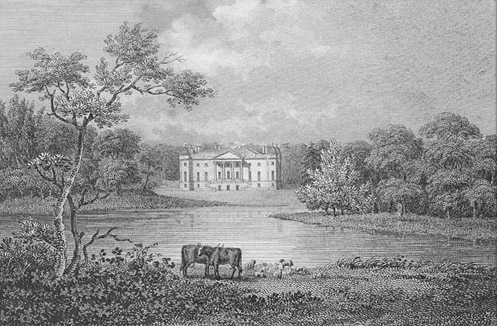
Foremarke Hall

He commissioned Foremarke Hall in Derbyshire to be built in 1794 as a stately home in 1760 for his son Francis Burdett. The architect was David Hiorns, a famous architect then whose architectural firm in London still thrives today. According to a directory published in 1846, the hall was "erected about the year 1762" by Sir Robert, replacing an earlier house on the site.

Sir Robert died in February 1797, aged 80, and was succeeded in the baronetcy by his grandson Sir Francis Burdett, the noted reformist politician, and the eldest son of Francis Burdett, who had predeceased him in 1794.

== See also ==
- Gentry
- Landed gentry
- Baronetcy
- Burdett baronets
- Sir Robert Burdett, 3rd Baronet
- Francis Burdett (1743)
- Sir Francis Burdett, 5th Baronet
- Foremark
- Foremarke Hall

== Notes ==
Parliament of Great Britain
Preceded by Thomas Villiers; Sir Henry Harpur	Member of Parliament for Tamworth; 1748–1768; With: Thomas Villiers 1748–56; Viscount Villiers 1756–65; Edward Thurlow 1765–68	Succeeded by Edward Thurlow; William de Grey
Baronetage of England
Preceded by Robert Burdett	Baronet (of Bramcote); 1716–1797	Succeeded by Francis Burdett
