= Burdett =

Burdett may refer to:

== Places ==
- Burdett, Alberta, Canada

=== United States ===
- Burdett, Kansas, a city
- Burdett, Mississippi, an unincorporated community
- Burdett, Missouri, an unincorporated community
- Burdett, New York, a village

== Other uses ==
- Burdett (surname)
- Burdett baronets, in England and Ireland
- Burdett College, based in Boston, Massachusetts (1879–1999)

== See also ==
- Burdette (disambiguation)
