= Francis Burdett =

English politician (1770–1844)

Sir Francis Burdett, Bt
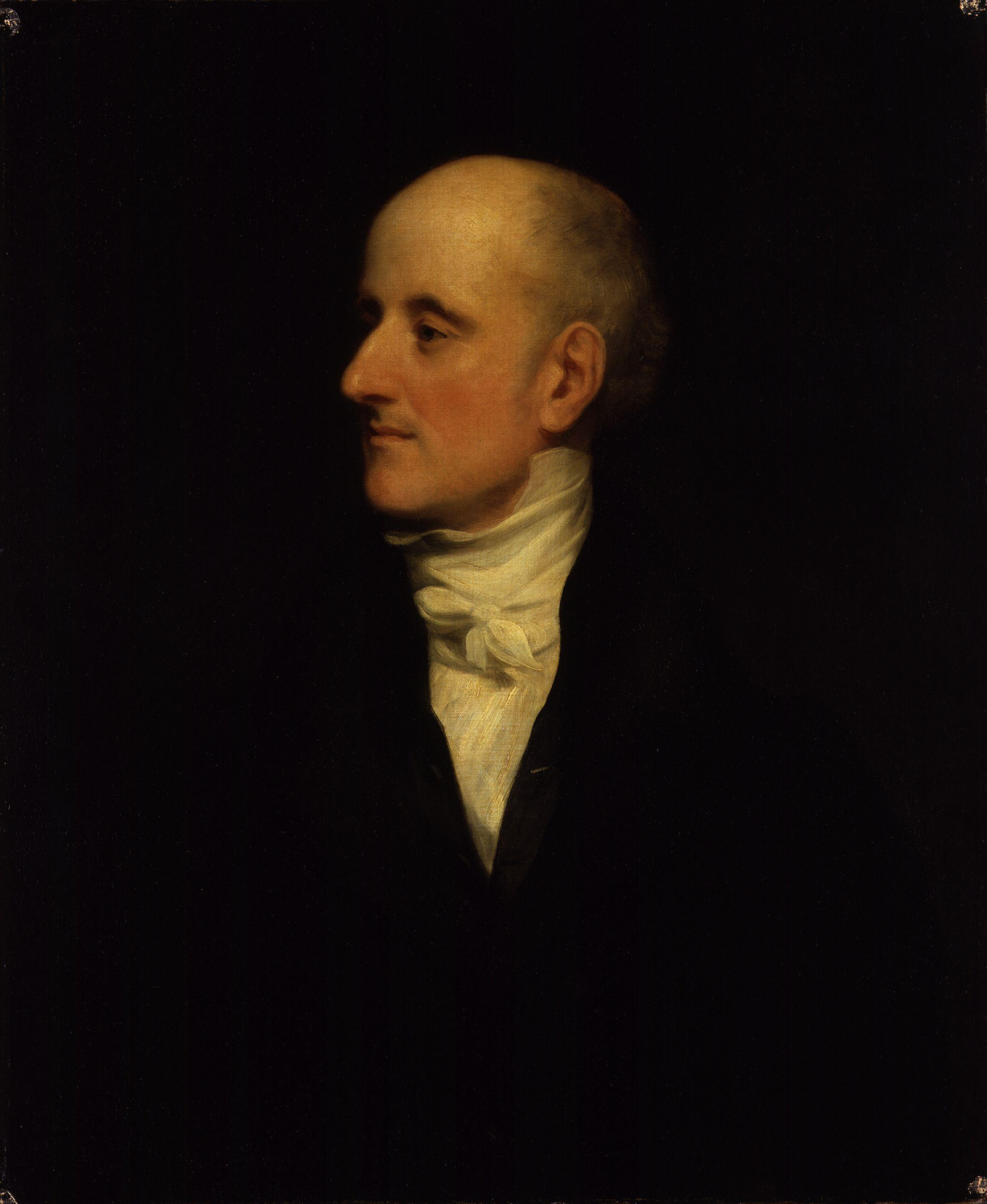
- Portrait by Thomas Phillips, 1834
- Born: Francis Burdett; 25 January 1770; Foremarke Hall, Derbyshire, England
- Died: 23 January 1844 (aged 73); 25 St James's Place, London, England
- Education: Westminster School; Christ Church, Oxford
- Occupation: Politician
- Known for: Electoral reform; political and social Radical
- Title: Sir
- Political party: Radical (until 1837); Conservative (from 1837)
- Spouse: Sophia Coutts (m. 1793; died 1844)
- Children: One son, Robert; five daughters, including Angela Burdett-Coutts
- Parents: Francis Burdett; Eleanor Burdett
- Relatives: Henry Coutts of Coutts, the bankers

Sir Francis Burdett, 5th Baronet (25 January 1770 – 23 January 1844) was an English politician and Member of Parliament who gained notoriety as a proponent (in advance of the Chartists) of universal male suffrage, equal electoral districts, vote by ballot, and annual parliaments. His commitment to reform resulted in legal proceedings and brief confinement to the Tower of London. In his later years he appeared reconciled to the very limited provisions of the 1832 Reform Act. He was the godfather of Francisco Burdett O'Connor, one of the famed Libertadores of the Spanish American wars of independence.

== Family ==
Sir Francis Burdett was the son of Francis Burdett and his wife Eleanor, daughter of William Jones of Ramsbury Manor, Wiltshire. He inherited the family baronetcy from his grandfather Sir Robert Burdett in 1797. From 1820 until his death, he lived at 25 St James's Place, London.

== Education and early life ==
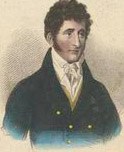
A young Sir Francis Burdett

He was educated at Westminster School and Christ Church, Oxford. When young, he was for a long time the notorious lover of Lady Oxford (according to the journal of Thomas Raikes), and afterwards travelled in France and Switzerland. He was in Paris during the earlier days of the French Revolution.

Returning to England in 1793, he married Sophia Coutts, the second daughter of the wealthy banker Thomas Coutts. She brought him the large fortune of £25,000. Their youngest daughter – Angela Burdett-Coutts – ultimately inherited the Coutts fortune and became a well-known philanthropist.

In 1796, he became Member of Parliament for Boroughbridge, having purchased this seat from the representatives of the Duke of Newcastle, and in 1797 succeeded his grandfather as 5th Baronet.

== Political career ==
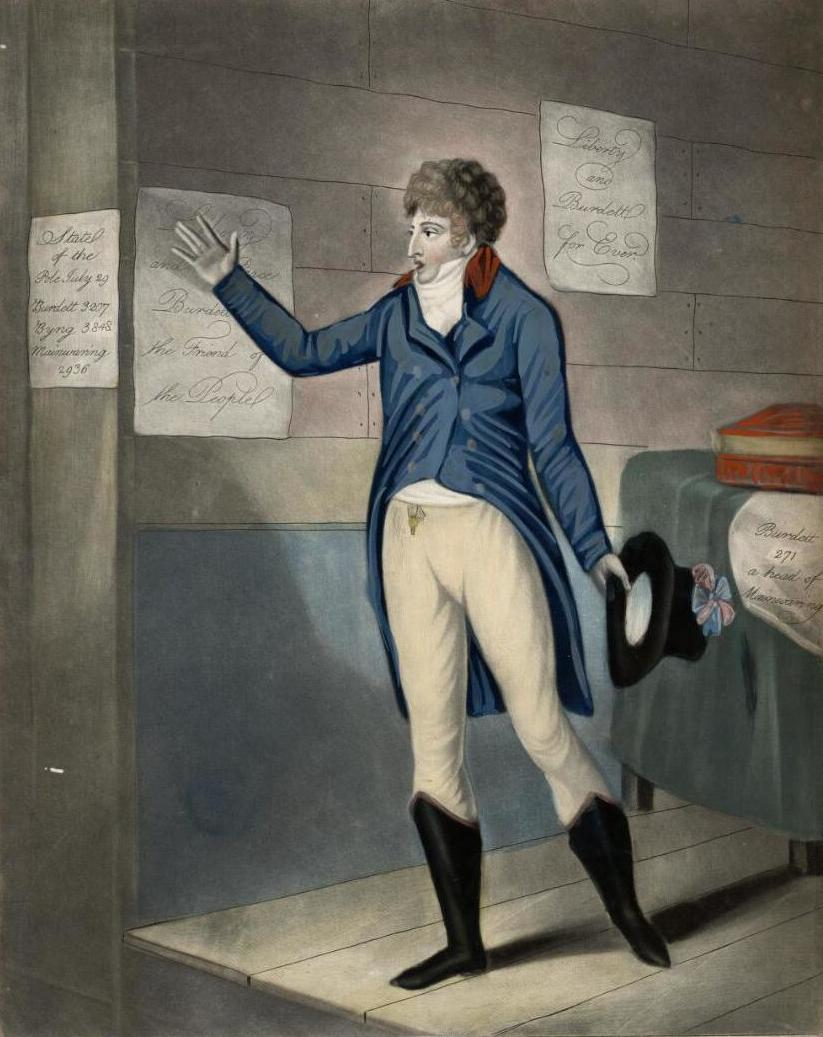
Burdett addressing the freeholders of the county of Middlesex from the Hustings, 1802

=== Opposition to the war and to political prosecutions ===
His inheritance included the family seat of Foremarke Hall and "the hamlets of Ingleby and Foremark (sometimes referred to as a manor) which were under his Lordship".

In Parliament he soon became prominent as an opponent of William Pitt the Younger, and as an advocate of popular rights. He denounced the war with France, the suspension of the Habeas Corpus Act, and the proposed exclusion of John Horne Tooke from parliament, and quickly became the idol of the people. He had made the acquaintance of Tooke in 1797, becoming his pupil not only in politics but also in philology.

With John Courtney MP, in 1798 Burdett supported the campaign of Catherine Despard to publicise and protest the conditions under which her Irish husband Colonel Edward Despard and other political radicals were held in Coldbath Fields Prison following the suspension of habeas corpus. Together they were instrumental in securing a parliamentary inquiry, and as a result Burdett was for a time prevented by the government from visiting any prison in the kingdom. Edward Despard, a member of the London Corresponding Society and a United Irishman remained in prison for three years. In 1803, after Despard was tried and (notwithstanding Horatio Nelson's intervention as a character witness) executed for treason, Burdett helped secure Catherine Despard a pension.

In Paris, 1802, Burdett presented the radical writer Thomas Paine with a gift of money to enable him to discharge his debts and return to the United States.

=== Re-election and controversies ===
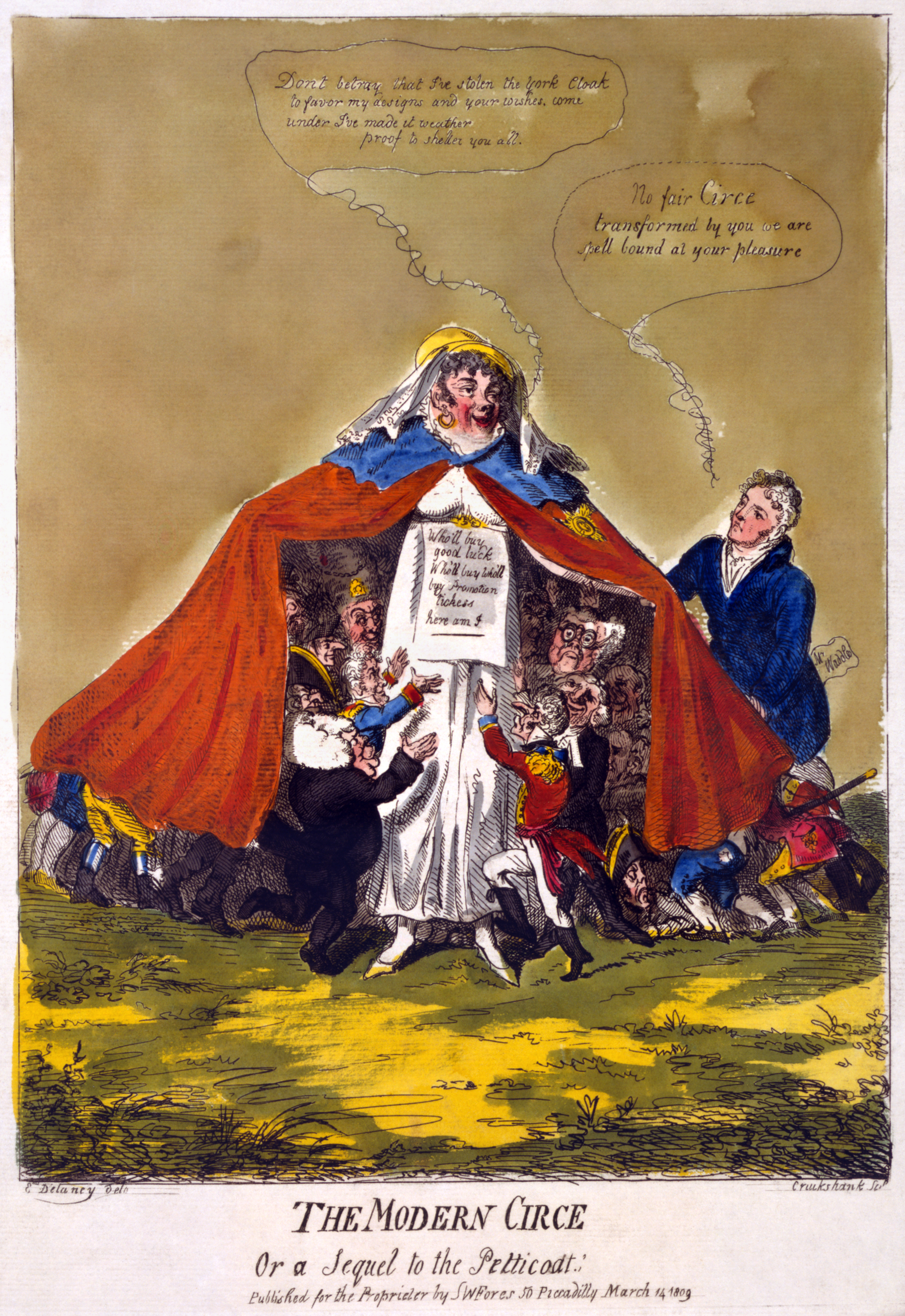
"The modern Circe or a sequel to the petticoat", caricature of Mary Anne Clarke, the mistress of the Duke of York, Prince Frederick, by Isaac Cruikshank, published 15 March 1809. Frederick would resign as Commander-in-Chief 10 days later.

At the general election of 1802 Burdett, assisted by the radical Irish journalist and publisher Peter Finnerty, was returned as Member of Parliament for the county of Middlesex, but his return was declared void in 1804 and he lost the ensuing by-election owing to the machinations of the returning officer. In 1805 this return was amended in his favor, but as this decision was again quickly reversed, Burdett, who had spent an immense sum of money over the affair, declared he would not stand for parliament again.

At the general election of 1806 Burdett was a leading supporter of James Paull, the reform candidate for the City of Westminster; but in the following year a misunderstanding led to a duel between Burdett and Paull in which both combatants were wounded. At the general election in 1807, Burdett, in spite of his reluctance, was nominated for Westminster, and amidst great enthusiasm was returned at the top of the poll.

In January 1809, Burdett participated with Gwyllym Wardle in the Duke of York scandal, by which Prince Frederick was relieved of his duties as Commander-in-Chief of the Forces, only to be reinstated two years later when Wardle had been shown to encourage the hostile testimony of Mary Anne Clarke, the mistress of Frederick.

He again attacked abuses, agitated for reform, and in 1810 came sharply into collision with the House of Commons. The radical John Gale Jones had been committed to prison by the House, and Burdett questioned the power of the House to take this step, and tried in vain to have him released. He then issued a revised edition of his speech on this occasion which was published by William Cobbett in the Weekly Register.

=== Warrant for his arrest ===
The House voted this action a breach of privilege, and the speaker issued a warrant for Burdett's arrest. The charge was libelling the House of Commons. Barring himself in his house for two days, he defied the authorities, while a mob gathered in his defence. Burdett's colleague Thomas Cochrane offered assistance, but, realizing that Cochrane intended to use military tactics during this civil and political affair, Burdett declined. At length the house was entered, and under an escort of soldiers he was conveyed to the Tower of London. Released when parliament was in recess, he caused his supporters much disappointment by returning to Westminster by water, and so avoiding a demonstration in his honour. He then brought legal actions against the speaker and the sergeant-at-arms, but the courts upheld the action of the House. Burdett's defence lawyer was Samuel Shepherd.

=== Reform ===
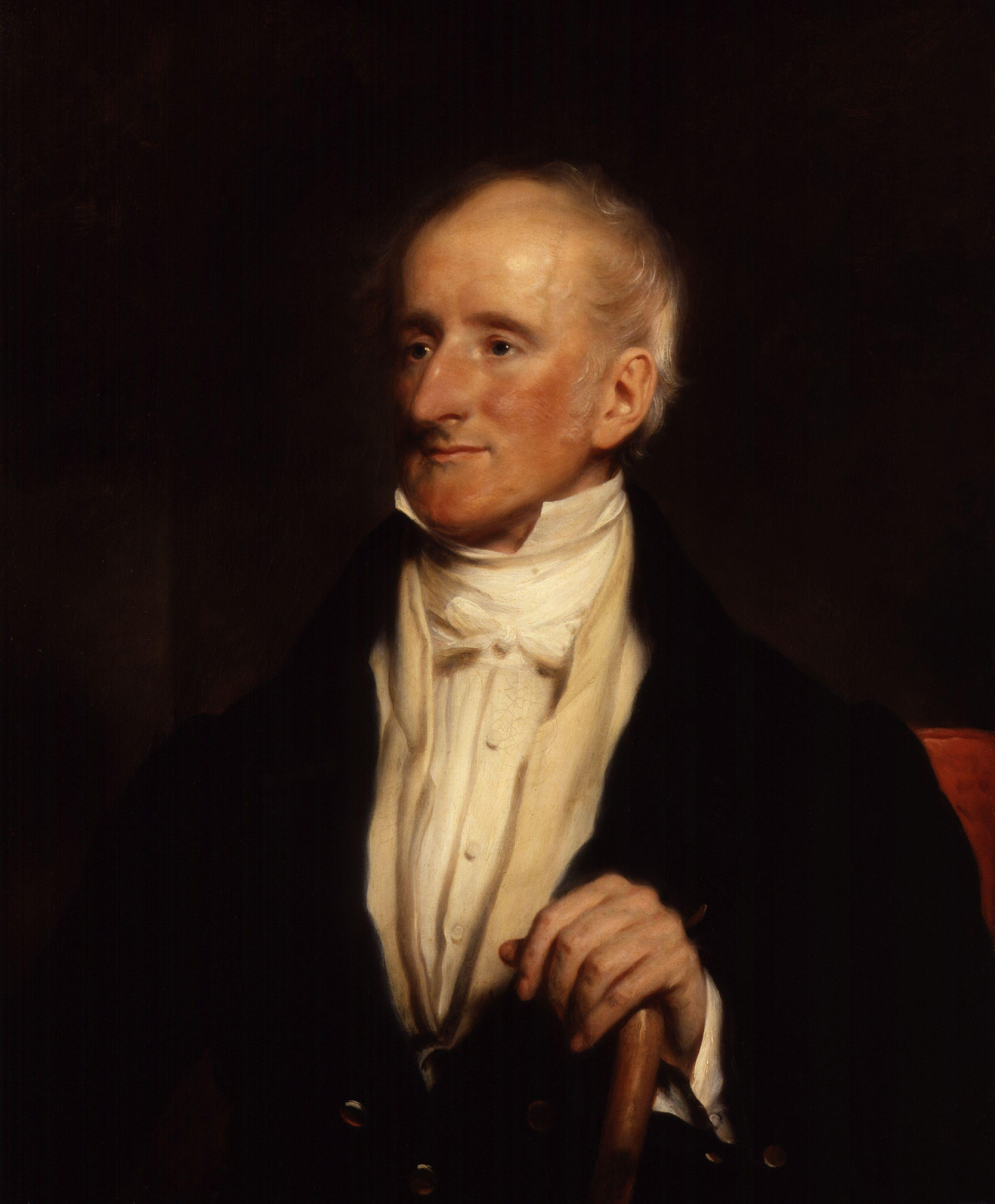
Portrait of Sir Francis Burdett by Sir Martin Archer Shee, 1843

In parliament Burdett denounced corporal punishment in the army, and supported all attempts to check corruption, but his principal efforts were directed towards procuring a reform of parliament, and the removal of Roman Catholic disabilities. In 1809 he had proposed a scheme of parliamentary reform, and returning to the subject in 1817 and 1818 he anticipated the Chartist movement by suggesting universal male suffrage, equal electoral districts, vote by ballot, and annual parliaments; but his motions met with very little support. He succeeded, however, in carrying a resolution in 1825 that the House should consider the laws concerning Roman Catholics. This was followed by a bill embodying his proposals, which passed the Commons but was rejected by the House of Lords. In 1827 and 1828 he again proposed resolutions on this subject, and saw his proposals become law in 1829.

In 1820 Burdett had again come into serious conflict with the government. Having severely censured its action in print with reference to the Peterloo Massacre, he was prosecuted at Leicester assizes, fined £1,000, and committed to prison by Justice Best for three months for the crime of "composing, writing, and publishing a seditious libel" with explanation:

My opinion of the liberty of the press is that every man ought to be permitted to instruct his fellow subjects; that every man may fearlessly advance any new doctrines, provided he does so with proper respect to the religion and government of the country; that he may point out errors in the measures of public men; but he must not impute criminal conduct to them. The liberty of the press cannot be carried to this extent without violating another equally sacred right; namely, the right of character. This right can only be attacked in a court of justice, where the party attacked has a fair opportunity of defending himself".

In 1821, John Cartwright proposed to Jeremy Bentham that they serve with Burdett as "Guardians of Constitutional Reform", their reports and observations to concern "the entire Democracy or Commons of the United Kingdom". The other "seven wise men" were to be Rev. William Draper; George Ensor, Rev. Richard Hayes, Robert Williams, and Matthew Wood.

=== Later career ===
After the passing of the Reform Act 1832, the ardour of the veteran reformer was somewhat abated, and a number of his constituents soon took umbrage at his changed attitude. Consequently, he resigned his seat early in 1837, but was re-elected. However, at the general election in the same year he forsook Westminster and was elected member for North Wiltshire, which seat he retained, acting in general with the Conservatives, until his death. He was nicknamed "Old Glory" by fellow conservatives.

== Death and descendants ==
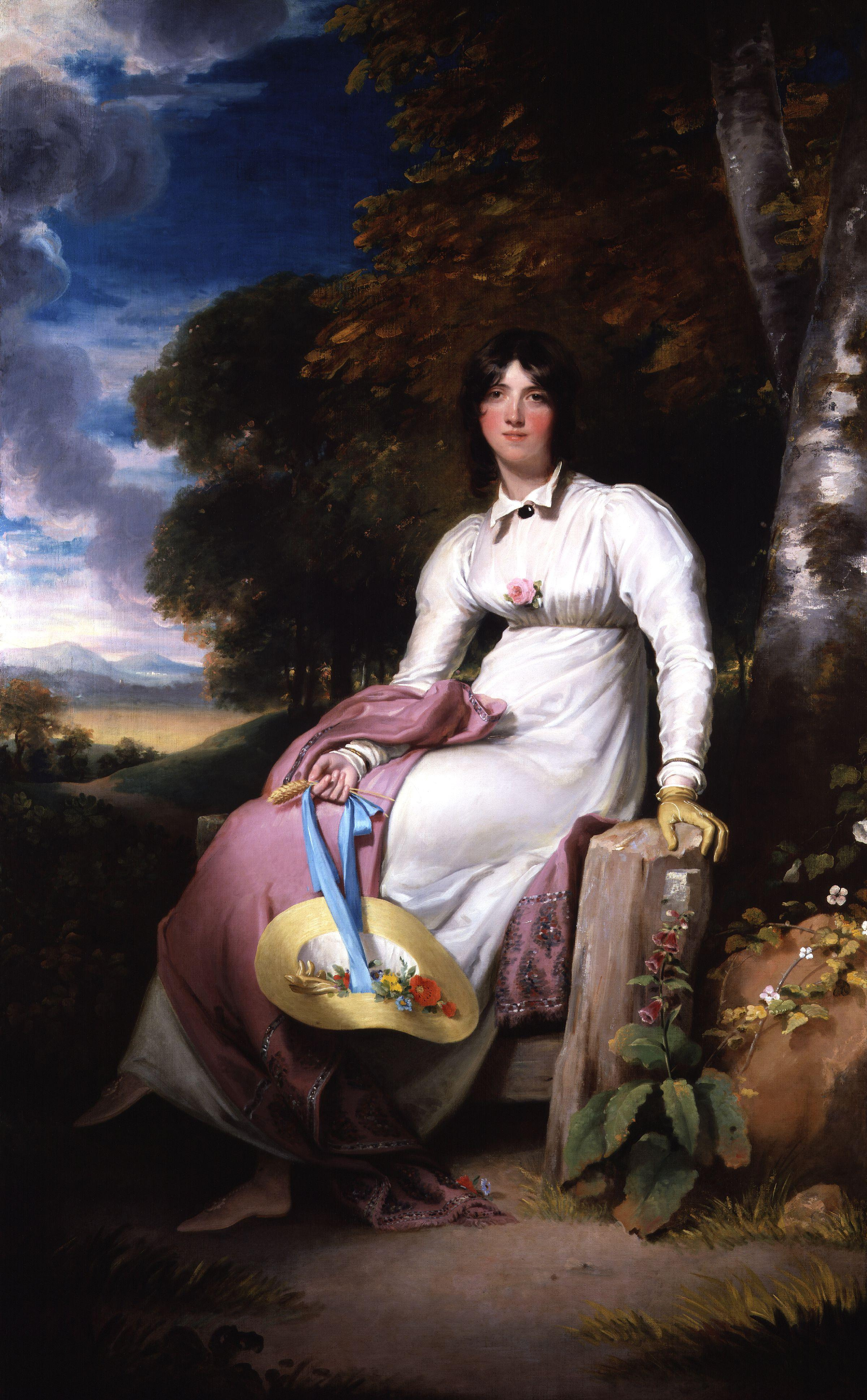
Sophia, Lady Burdett by Sir Thomas Lawrence, c.1793

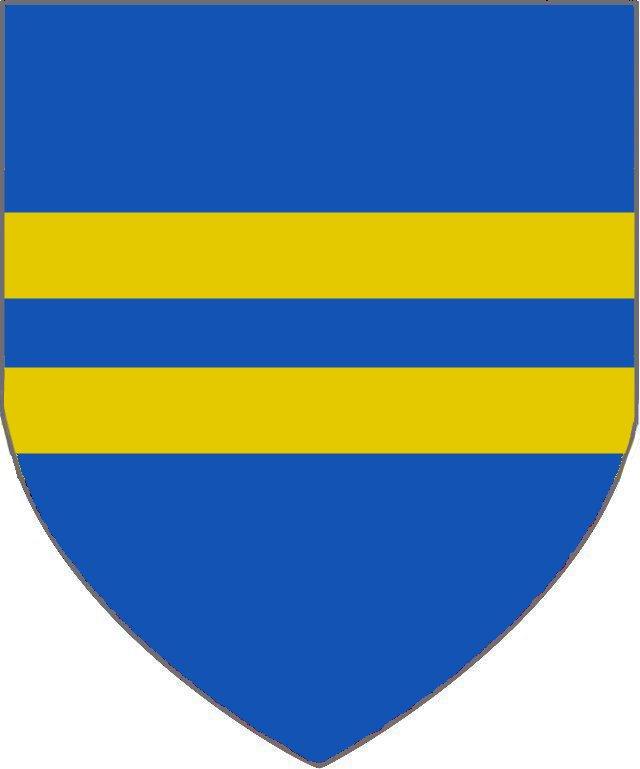
Arms of Burdett of Bramcote: Azure, two bars or

His wife, Lady Burdett, to whom he was devoted, died on 13 January 1844. Sir Francis, then twelve days short of his 74th birthday, became inconsolable and felt he had nothing left to live for. He refused all food and died just ten days later on 23 January 1844. He and his wife were buried at the same time in the same vault at Ramsbury Church, Wiltshire.

He left a son, Robert, who succeeded to the baronetcy and inherited his very large fortune, and five daughters, the youngest of whom became the celebrated Baroness Burdett-Coutts after inheriting the Coutts fortune from her grandfather's widow Harriet, Duchess of St Albans and appending the Coutts surname under the terms of Harriet's will. Robert was a member of the Literary Association of the Friends of Poland. He also brought up two of the sons of his friend the Irish nationalist Roger O'Connor, who both became notable political radicals. One of these was Feargus O'Connor, one of the main leaders of the Chartists; the other was Francisco Burdett O'Connor, who fought in Simón Bolívar's army.

== See also ==
- Burdett baronets
- Francis Burdett (1743)
- Baroness Burdett-Coutts
- National Political Union
- Thomas Coutts
- Foremarke Hall

== Notes ==
Parliament of Great Britain
Preceded by Sir Richard Sutton; Morris Robinson	Member of Parliament for Boroughbridge; 1796–1801; With: Sir John Scott 1796–1799; John Scott 1799–1801	Succeeded by Parliament of the United Kingdom
Parliament of the United Kingdom
Preceded by Parliament of Great Britain	Member of Parliament for Boroughbridge; 1801–1802; With: John Scott	Succeeded by John Scott; Edward Portman
Preceded by William Mainwaring; George Byng	Member of Parliament for Middlesex; 1802–1804; With: George Byng	Succeeded by George Byng; George Boulton Mainwaring
Preceded by George Byng; George Boulton Mainwaring	Member of Parliament for Middlesex; 1805–1806; With: George Byng	Succeeded by George Byng; George Boulton Mainwaring
Preceded by Sir Samuel Hood; Richard Brinsley Sheridan	Member of Parliament for Westminster; 1807–1837; With: Lord Cochrane 1807–1818; Sir Samuel Romilly 1818–1819; George Lamb 1819–1820; Sir John Hobhouse 1820–1833; De Lacy Evans 1833–1837	Succeeded by George de Lacy Evans; John Temple Leader
Preceded by Paul Methuen; Walter Long	Member of Parliament for Wiltshire North; 1837–1844; With: Walter Long	Succeeded by Walter Long; Thomas Sotheron
Baronetage of England
Preceded by Robert Burdett	Baronet (of Bramcote); 1797–1844	Succeeded by Robert Burdett
