= Ramsbury Manor =

Country house in Wiltshire, England

Coordinates: 51.4374°N 1.6317°W

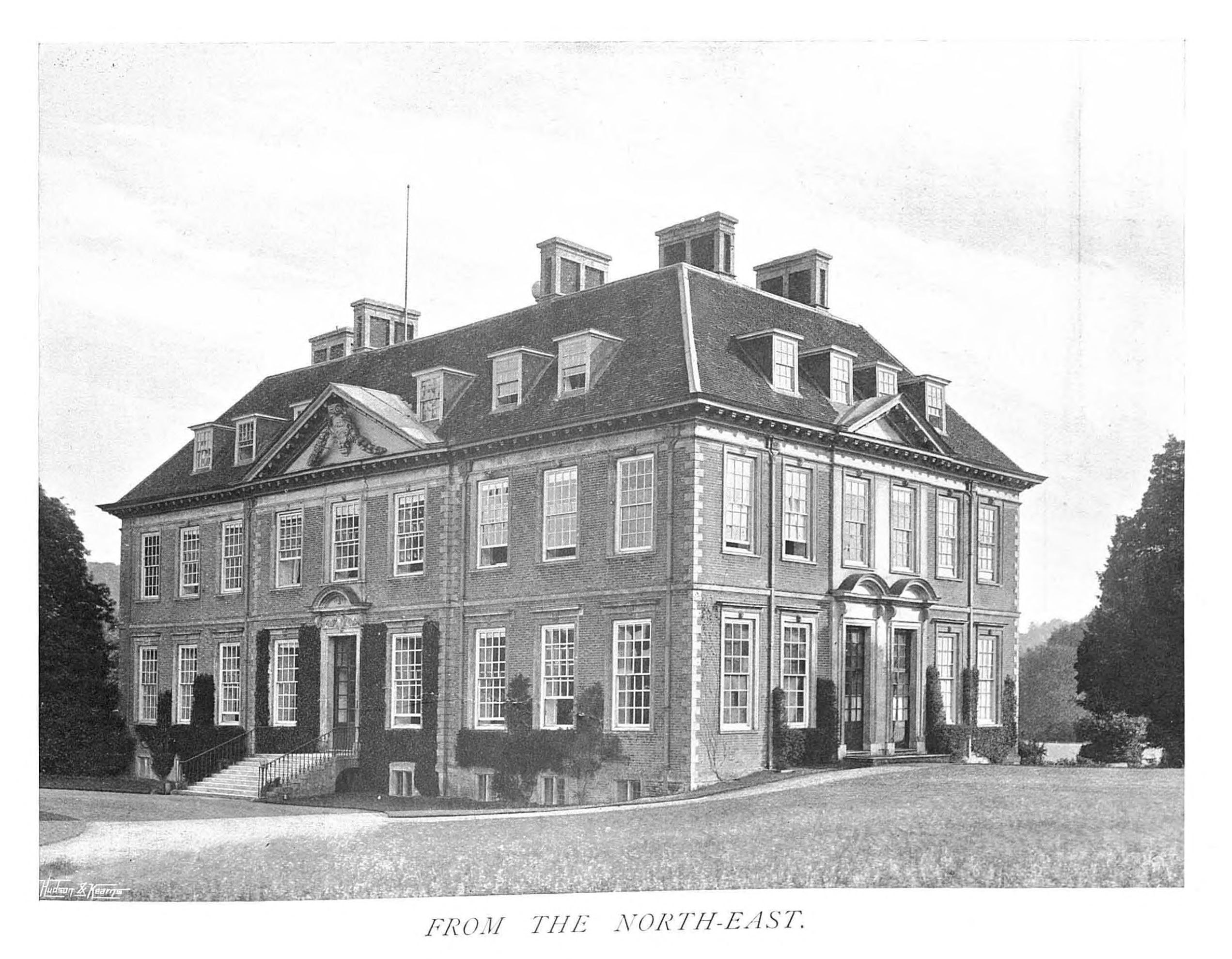
- Ramsbury Manor from a book published in 1909

- Location within Wiltshire
- Location: Ramsbury, Wiltshire, England

History
- Built: 1680s

Site notes
- Architect: Robert Hooke

Listed Building – Grade I
- Official name: Ramsbury Manor
- Designated: 22 August 1966
- Reference no.: 1184029

Ramsbury Manor is a Grade I listed country house at Ramsbury, Wiltshire, on the River Kennet between Hungerford and Marlborough, in the south of England.

It belongs to the Capricorn Foundation, a trust which has the task of maintaining the house as a museum and cultural resource for the nation.

== Description ==
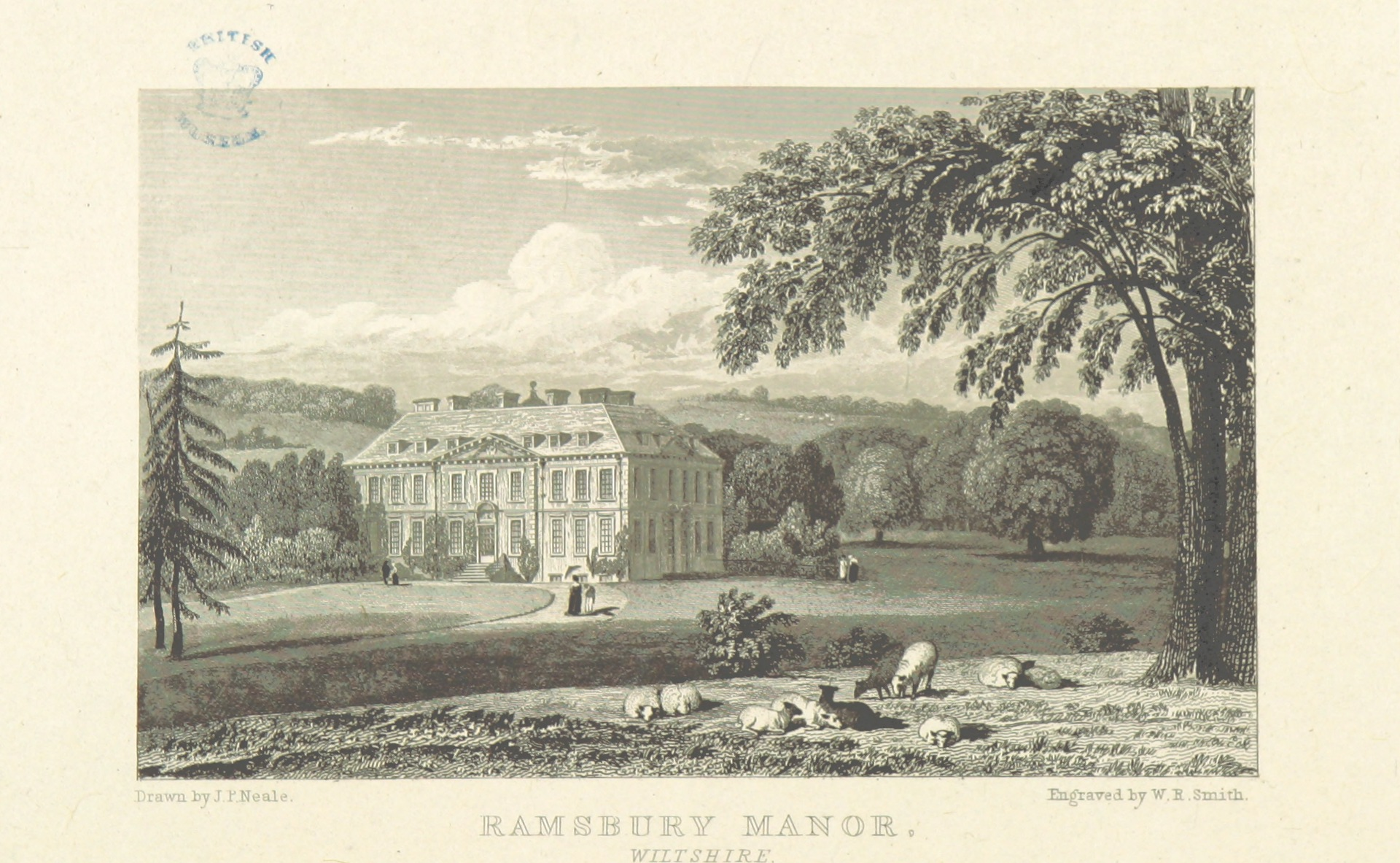
Ramsbury Manor in 1818

The house dates from the 1680s, apart from an earlier stable building. It has two storeys and an attic, with nine bays at the front; to the south is a courtyard of cottages for servants. The gates are flanked by panelled ashlar columns, each bearing a lion supporting a shield. On each side is a square lodge, also in ashlar.

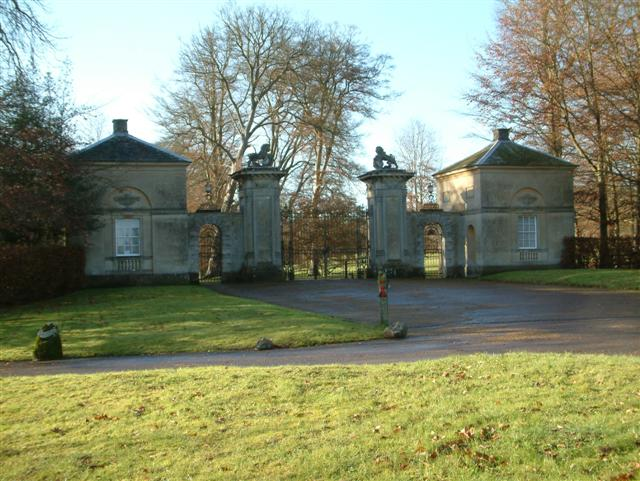
East gate and lodges

In 1966 the house was recorded as Grade I listed, and the east gate and lodges as Grade II*. At the same time the mid-17th century stables to the south of the house were listed at Grade II.

The gardens dating from the late 17th century and early 18th, and a kitchen garden begun later in the 18th century, are listed Grade II on the Register of Historic Parks and Gardens. The property is set in parkland of 153 acres, or about 62 hectares.

Designed by Robert Hooke, the house is considered one of the best examples of his work, being dignified and built to the highest standards of the time. Nikolaus Pevsner wrote that the house is a "perfect example of the moderate-sized brick mansion of about 1680, a parallel to Melton Constable or Felbrigg or Denham Place". He also states that the house "lies beautifully by the river".

== History ==
An earlier Ramsbury Manor House was built on the site in 1560 for the Earl of Pembroke. Only its timber-framed stable block to the northeast now survives.

In 1676, Sir William Jones bought the estate. He wanted a country house to match his status and turned to Robert Hooke, one of the leading architects of the day, whom he already knew from work Hooke had supervised on Jones's town house in Bloomsbury, London. Hooke met Jones at least five times in 1681 and probably provided him with plans of the existing house.

Construction of the house began about 1681, and it was unfinished when Jones died in May 1682. The main structure of the house was completed in 1683, but work on the interior continued until 1686.

=== 18th century ===
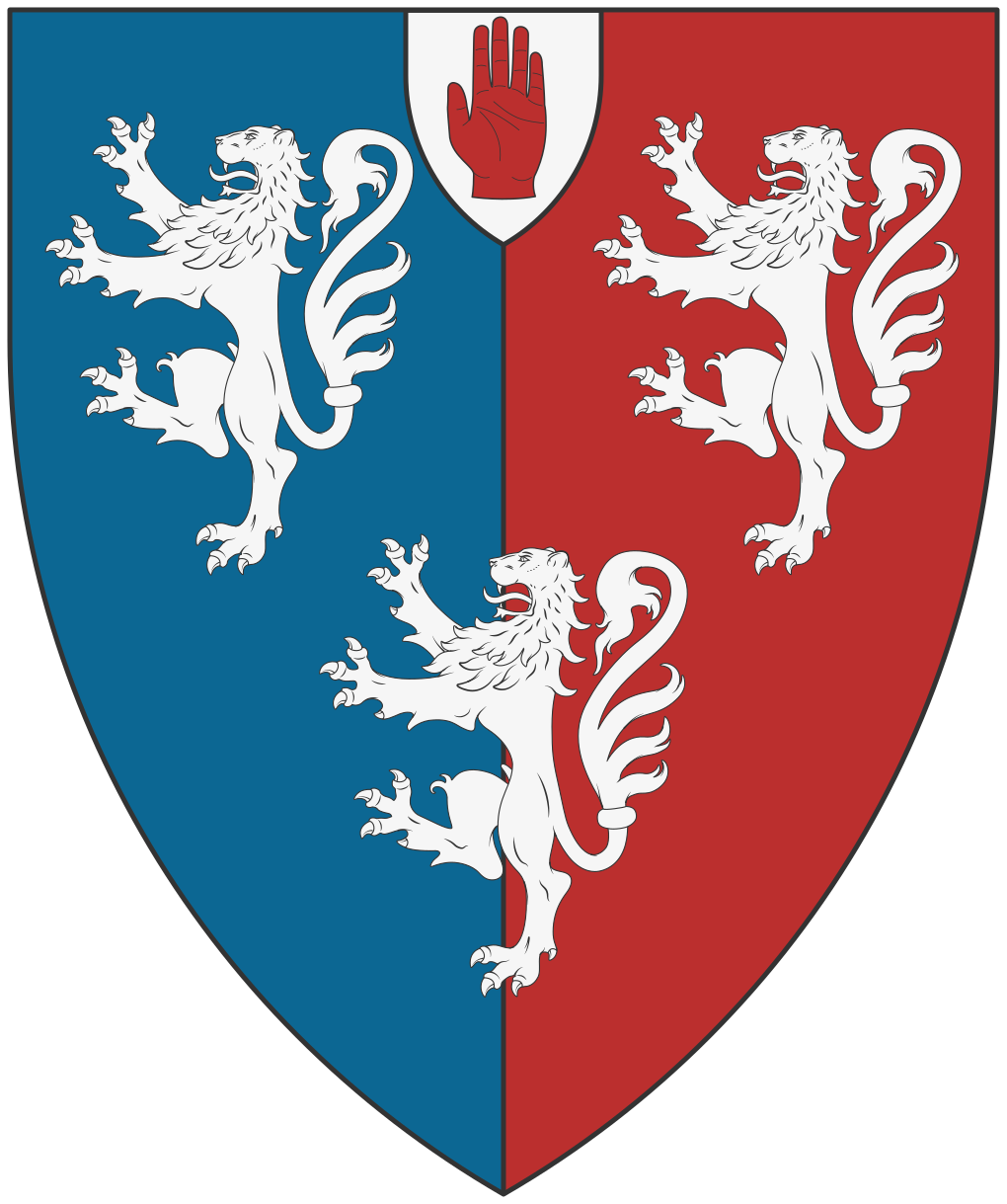
The coat of arms of Sir William Jones of Ramsbury, Baronet.

The house stayed in the Jones family until the death of Elizabeth Jones in 1800.

The Jones baronetcy of Ramsbury was created in the Baronetage of the United Kingdom on 9 July 1774 for Elizabeth's husband, William Langham (c.1737–1791), who took the name William Langham Jones. As the owner of the property from 1766, he made improvements to the house and park which included a five-arch ornamental bridge over a weir, to turn the Kennet into a lake; the east lodges; and the orangery at the south front of the house.

Eleanor Jones, sister of Elizabeth Jones, married Francis Burdett (1743–1794). On the deaths of William and Elizabeth, who were childless, the house thus passed into the Burdett family. Their son was Sir Francis Burdett (1770–1844), a Radical Whig politician, whose daughter Angela Burdett-Coutts (1814–1906) was at one time the richest woman in England. Over time, land which had been sold in the 17th century was bought back to enlarge the estate, which amounted to about 4,000 acres (1,600 ha) in 1880.

=== 20th and 21st centuries ===
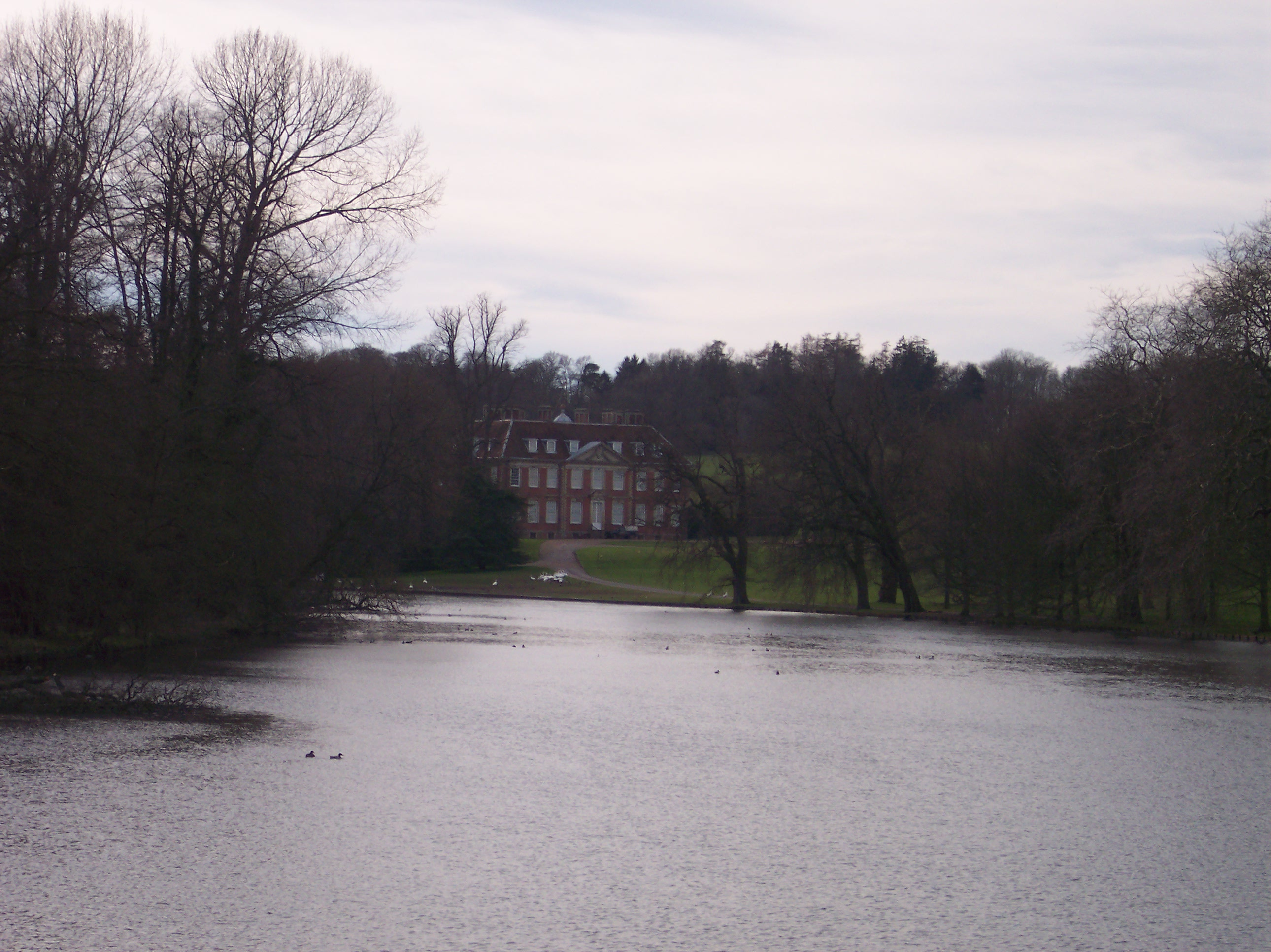
View of Ramsbury Manor across the lake in its park, 2007

Sir Ernest Salter Wills, 3rd Baronet of Hazelwood, Lord Lieutenant for the County of Wiltshire (1930–1942) acquired Ramsbury Manor before he succeeded to the Baronetcy, inherited from his older brother, Sir Edward Channing Wills, 2nd Baronet, upon the death of their father, Sir Edward Payson Wills, 1st Baronet, in 1910. In the early 1920s, Sir Ernest purchased the nearby Littlecote House.

After the death of Sir Francis Burdett, 8th Baronet, in 1951, the house and much of its land were bought by the 7th Earl of Wilton, who sold the house and its surrounding land to industrialist William Rootes in 1958; he was created Baron Rootes, of Ramsbury in the County of Wiltshire, in 1959. After his death in December 1964, the estate was bought by the property developer Harry Hyams and was his home until his death in 2015. The purchase price was £650,000 and the Guinness Book of Records for 1966 described it as "the most expensive house in Britain".

On 1 February 2006 the house was the scene of a major burglary by the Johnson Gang. The gang were caught and convicted; the prosecutor Paul Reid said: "This has been described as the most valuable domestic burglary ever committed in this country. The collection is described as priceless. There is a difficulty in putting a value on antiques and antiquities – some of them very precious and very rare – but it is tens of millions of pounds." In August 2008 the gang received long prison sentences.

In his will, Hyams gave the house and his collections of fine art and cars to the nation via his Capricorn Foundation, in a bequest reported to be worth £450M. The foundation set up an incorporated charity, the Ramsbury Manor Foundation, in 2017 and transferred the estate to it in 2018. The two bodies have the same trustees and the Capricorn Foundation continues to fund the charity.

Major external restoration, which included replacing the roof, began in 2019; in 2023 it was reported that this work, together with restoration of courtyard buildings to form an administrative centre, had cost £5M. In 2022, planning approval was sought for construction of a visitor centre in the courtyard, with a lecture theatre and exhibition space for cars and boats, and construction of a replacement estate yard. Historic England considered that, on balance, the plans were harmful to the historic environment of the site.

== Namesakes ==
In 1950, the last of the GWR Manor Class steam locomotives to be built was named Ramsbury Manor.

== Notes ==
- Burke's Peerage and Baronetage: Wills of Hazelwood Baronets

Baronetage of Great Britain
Preceded by ffolkes baronets	Jones baronets of Ramsbury; 27 May 1774	Succeeded by Montgomery baronets
