= George Burdett =

George Burdett may refer to:

- George Burdett (governor)
- George Burdett (politician)
- George Burdett (priest)

== See also ==
- George Burditt (disambiguation)
