= Robert Jones Burdette =

American humorist (1844–1914)

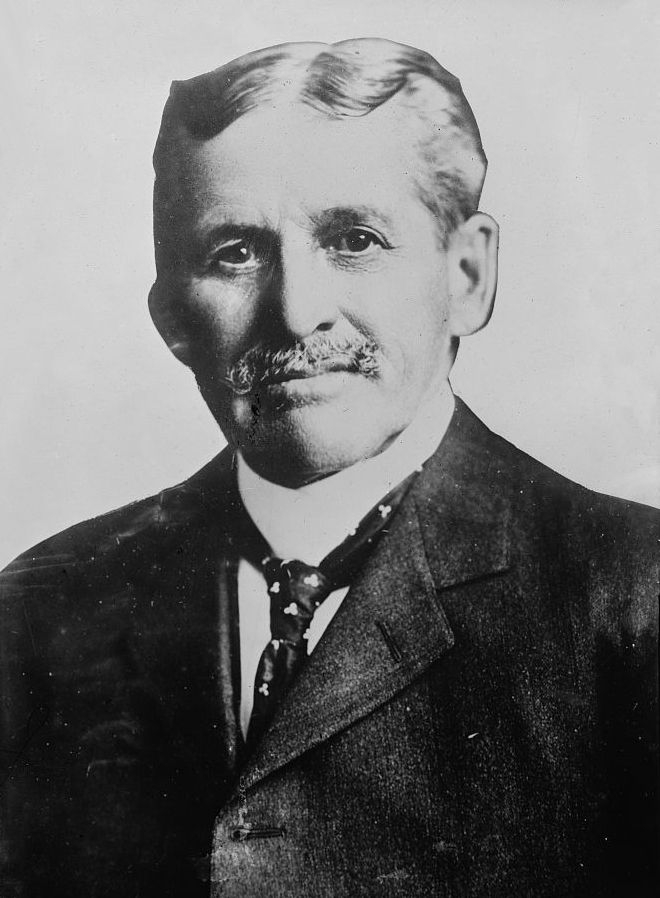
- Born: July 30, 1844; Greensboro, Pennsylvania
- Died: November 19, 1914 (aged 70)
- Occupations: Humorist; clergyman
- Spouses: Caroline S. Garret; Clara (Bradley) Baker (m. 1899)

Robert Jones Burdette (July 30, 1844 – November 19, 1914) was an American humorist and clergyman who became noted through his paragraphs in The Hawk Eye newspaper in Burlington, Iowa. Mary G. Burdette was his sister.

== Early life ==
He was born in Greensboro, Pennsylvania, and received a secondary education in Peoria, Illinois. During the Civil War he served as a private in the 47th Illinois infantry. In 1869 he became night editor of the Peoria Daily Transcript and afterward was associated with other newspapers. He joined the staff of the The Hawk Eye in Burlington, Iowa, in 1872, and his humorous paragraphs soon began to be quoted in newspapers throughout the country.

With the encouragement of his first wife, the former Caroline S. Garret of Peoria, he began speaking in public. Consequently, he made a number of successful lecture tours. His lecture, "The Rise and Fall of the Mustache", was delivered well over three thousand times during a 30-year period. He also wrote the poem "Orphan Born", as well as "My First Cigar". He was sometimes referred to as the "Burlington Hawkeye Man". In 1884, he left the Hawk Eye to replace Stanley Huntley as the staff humorist for the Brooklyn Daily Eagle.

== Ministerial career ==
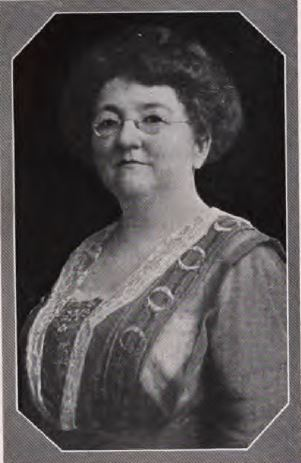
Clara Bradley Baker, Mrs. Robert J. Burdette, from Who's Who Among the Women of California

He became a licensed minister of the Baptist church in 1897 and took charge of the Temple Baptist Church, Los Angeles, California, in 1903, becoming its pastor emeritus in 1909. His first wife died after 16 years of marriage, and in 1899 he married Clara (Bradley) Baker (1855-1954), a Pasadena widow active in the Temple Baptist Church and various civic organizations. She was a founder of Alpha Phi Fraternity, author of several books, and a philanthropist.

During his final years, the couple lived in Pasadena, in a home on Orange Grove Boulevard, where he died in 1914.

== Legacy ==
Robert Jones Burdette's writings were the source of humorous lectures by John Austen Hamlin on Hamlin's tours to promote his Wizard Oil patent medicine.

A collection of Burdette's writings, edited by Clara, was published in 1922 under the title Robert J. Burdette: His Message.

== Partial list of books ==
- The Rise and Fall of the Mustache and other "Hawk-Eyetems" (1877)
- Hawkeyes (1880)
- Life of William Penn (1882)
- Innach Gerden and Other Comic Sketches (1886)
- Chimes from a Jester's Bells (1897)
- Gems of Modern Wit and Humor with stories and introduction by Robert J Burdette (1903)
- American Biography & Genealogy, Volume I, Chicago: Lewis Pub. Co. (1910)
- Old Time and Young Tom (1912)
- A Little Philosophy of Life (1914)
- As Thy Day, Saalfield Publishing Co., Akron Ohio (date unknown) credited as Robert J. Burdette, D.D. and others
