= George Burditt =

George Burditt may refer to:

- George Burditt (lawyer) (1922–2013), American lawyer and politician
- George Burditt (writer) (1923–2013), American screenwriter and producer
- George Burditt (footballer) (1910–1981), English footballer

== See also ==
- George Burdett (disambiguation)
