= Formula One Paddock Club =

Formula One hospitality service

- Industry: Hospitality
- Founded: March 1984; 42 years ago
- Founder: Paddy McNally
- Headquarters: Geneva, Switzerland
- Number of locations: 24 worldwide
- Parent: Formula One Group

The Formula One Paddock Club, known simply as the Paddock Club, is the Formula One hospitality service. Known for its high prices and exclusivity, it caters to VIP guests and team sponsors, offering luxury dining and superior views at Formula One Grand Prix events.

== History ==
The Formula One Paddock Club was founded by Paddy McNally, chief executive of Allsport Management, a company part of the Formula One Group. McNally originally worked as a sponsorship consultant for Marlboro with John Hogan before becoming a business partner of Bernie Ecclestone. He started working closely with Ecclestone in the late 1970s, chiefly on the circuit advertising, and then on the hospitality concept. Launched in the 1984 season, the Paddock Club first operated at the races in France, Austria and Belgium. In the first year, McNally lost credibility as the Paddock Club met with limited success, having predicted to sell 600 tickets but only managing to sell 170. Frank Williams complained that "this (the Paddock Club) isn't Ascot"! to which the reply was that "it needs to be". McNally considered quitting, but was ultimately persuaded by Ecclestone to hang on.

By 1985, the Paddock Club became more successful; sponsors were attracted and advertisements were coming in. However, the teams complained that the prices were too high and restrictions on access too strict. Ecclestone threatened to close and so the teams were forced to comply. By the late 1980s, the hospitality concept finally turned into a success and was highly lucrative. At the time, notable guests included George Harrison and numerous Hollywood celebrities.

== Facilities ==
The Paddock Club is located above the pit garages, giving guests a view of the start-finish straight and the pit lane. The standard package includes a hospitality suite, an open bar, chef-prepared catering and a guided pit lane walk at set times across the race weekend; some rounds add pit or paddock tours, driving simulators and appearances by drivers and Formula One ambassadors. Individual teams also sell their own branded suites within the Paddock Club building, which typically add garage tours and driver appearances.

== Present operation ==
Since McNally sold Allsport to CVC in 2006, and his subsequent retirement in 2011, management of the Paddock Club has been entirely in control of the Formula One Group, itself under the ownership of Liberty Media. Presently, a ticket costs upwards of $6,499 for a Grand Prix weekend package. Prices vary considerably between rounds: a comparison of approximate three-day package prices across the 2026 calendar ranged from around $5,800 at the Azerbaijan Grand Prix, the cheapest round, to around $15,500 at the Monaco Grand Prix, with a median of roughly $10,000. The variation is driven mainly by local demand, hospitality capacity and host-city costs rather than by differences in the package itself, with street races in destination cities such as Monaco, Miami and Las Vegas at the top of the range and high-capacity permanent circuits such as Spa-Francorchamps and the Red Bull Ring among the cheapest. Forecasts estimated 50,000 tickets are sold per year. Notable guests have included: Tom Cruise, Keanu Reaves, Michael Douglas and Eva Longoria.
