= Francis Burdett (1743–1794) =

British aristocrat and painting subject (1743–1794)

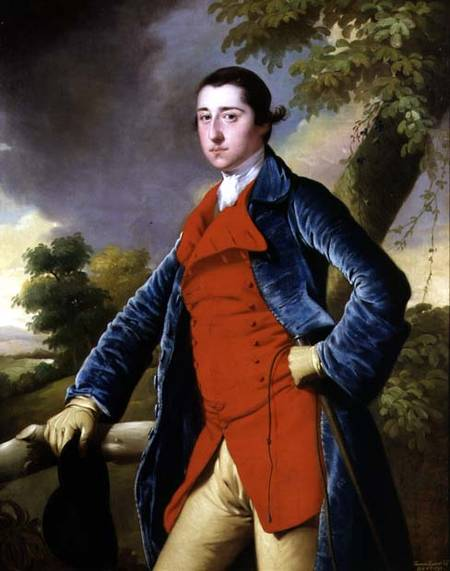
- Portrait by Joseph Wright of Derby, c. 1762–63
- Born: 1743 bapt. Foremark, Derbyshire
- Died: 3 February 1794 (aged 50–51)
- Spouse: Eleanor Jones
- Children: Sir Francis Burdett; William Jones Burdett
- Parent: Sir Robert Burdett, 4th Baronet

Francis Burdett (1743–1794) was a member of the Burdett family of Bramcote which had a lineage of baronetcy. He failed to inherit the hereditary baronetcy, as he died in 1794, before his father's death in 1797. He is the subject of two notable paintings.

== Biography ==
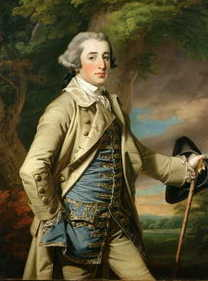
Burdett by Francis Cotes in 1764

Burdett was born in 1743 and baptised at Foremark, a hamlet near his families ancestral home of Foremarke Hall, Derbyshire. He was the son of Sir Robert Burdett, 4th Baronet and his first wife. His mother Elizabeth died when he was young on 24 August 1747 and his father married again. When Burdett came of age his father was having the ancestral home of Foremarke Hall remodelled.

Burdett was the brother-in-law of Francis Mundy and a member of the private Markeaton Hunt. In 1762–3 Mundy commissioned a set of six portraits. Each of the subjects was in the distinctive dress of the Markeaton Hunt, consisting of a blue coat over a scarlet waistcoat and yellow breeches. These paintings hung at Mundy's ancestral home, Markeaton Hall. A year or so later there was another portrait by Francis Cotes.

Burdett married Eleanor Jones, daughter of William Jones of Ramsbury Manor, Wiltshire, on 30 December 1766. His children were Sir Francis Burdett, 5th Bt., born 25 January 1770, and William Jones Burdett (ca. 1772 – 1840) who fathered the 7th Baronet.

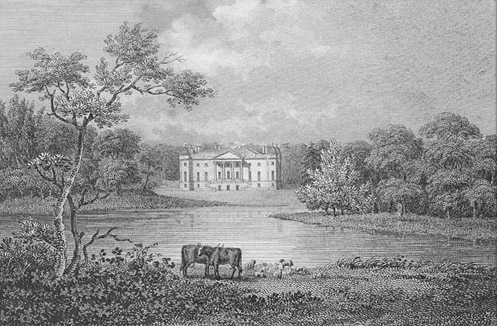
Foremarke Hall drawn by G. Shepherd, engraved by W. Angus. 1805
