= Burdett baronets of Burthwaite (1665) =

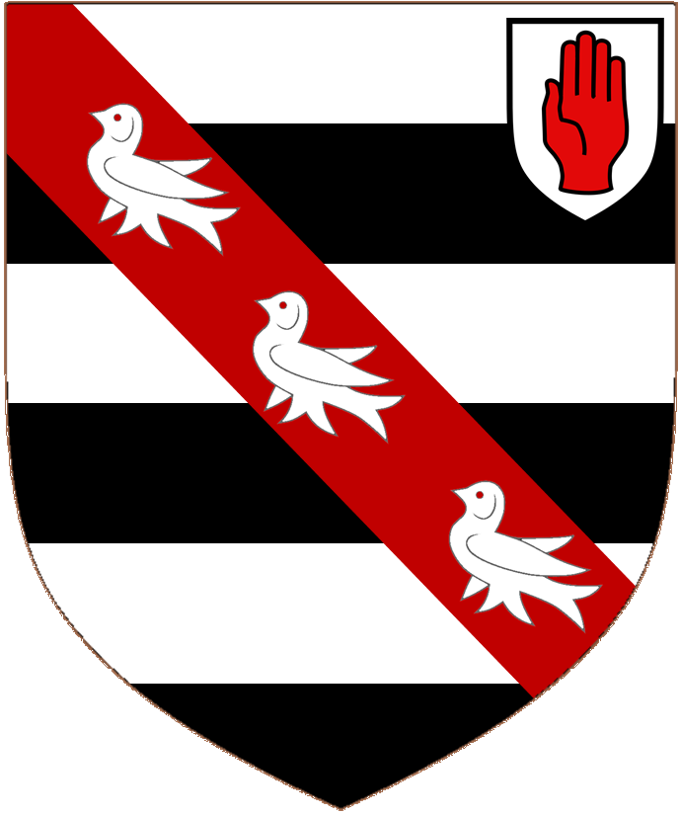
Escutcheon of Burdett of Burthwaite

The Burdett baronetcy, of Burthwaite in the County of York (now Birthwaite Hall, Darton, South Yorkshire), was created in the Baronetage of England on 25 July 1665 for Francis Burdett.

His grandson, Hugh, the 3rd Baronet, was Rector of Newington, Kent. He died childless in 1760 and was succeeded by his younger brother, Charles, the 4th Baronet. He was Collector of Customs at St. Augustine, Florida. He was succeeded by his eldest son, Charles, the 5th Baronet, a Lieutenant-Colonel in the 56th Regiment of Foot. He died unmarried in 1839 and was succeeded by his nephew, Charles, the 6th Baronet, the son of Captain Jerome Burdett, younger son of the 4th Baronet.

The title descended from father to son until the early death of his great-grandson, Charles, the 9th Baronet, in 1940. He was succeeded by his first cousin once removed, Henry, the 10th Baronet. He was the son of Reverend William Jerome Burdett, younger son of the 6th Baronet. As of 2026 the title is held by his grandson, Crispin, the 12th Baronet, who succeeded his father in 2017.

== Burdett baronets, of Burthwaite (1665) ==
- Sir Francis Burdett, 1st Baronet (1642–c.1719)
- Sir Francis Burdett, 2nd Baronet (1675–1747)
- Sir Hugh Burdett, 3rd Baronet (1715–1760)
- Sir Charles Burdett, 4th Baronet (1728–1803)
- Sir Charles Wyndham Burdett, 5th Baronet (1771–1839)
- Sir Charles Wentworth Burdett, 6th Baronet (1806–1848)
- Sir Charles Wentworth Burdett, 7th Baronet (1835–1890)
- Sir Charles Grant Burdett, 8th Baronet (1875–1918)
- Sir Charles Coventry Burdett, 9th Baronet (1902–1940)
- Sir Henry Aylmer Burdett, 10th Baronet (1881–1943)
- Sir Savile Aylmer Burdett, 11th Baronet (1931–2017)
- Sir Crispin Peter Burdett, 12th Baronet (born 1967).
