= Paddy McNally =

British motorsport businessman (1937–2026)

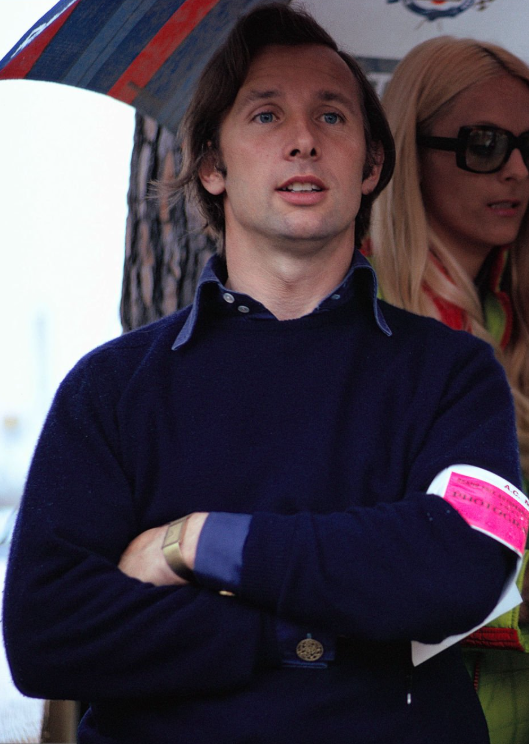
- Born: Patrick Sean McNally; 20 December 1937; Gravesend, Kent, England
- Died: 22 July 2026 (aged 88); Sevenhampton, Wiltshire, England
- Occupations: Motorsport executive; entrepreneur; racing driver
- Years active: 1963–2011
- Term: Managing director of Allsport Management
- Spouse: Anne Downing (m. 1967; died 1980)
- Children: 2

Patrick Sean McNally (20 December 1937 – 22 July 2026) was a British businessman and racing driver. He was chief executive of Allsport Management, a Swiss-based company which controlled Formula One advertising and hospitality via the Paddock Club.

== Early life ==
McNally was born on 20 December 1937 in Gravesend, Kent, the son of Group Captain Patrick McNally, an RAF medical officer, and Mary Deane Outred. His elder brother was LWT director Peter McNally (1933-2021). A relative was Irish racing driver Redmond Gallagher.

He was raised in County Monaghan, Ireland, and then educated at Stonyhurst College. In his youth he excelled at rugby and boxing. After abandoning training as an accountant, he worked as a travelling salesman.

== Career ==
Entering the world of motorsport, McNally's first race was in 1959. He continued mid-level sports car, rally and endurance racing throughout the 1960s; winning several notable races, but otherwise achieving little success. Meanwhile, since 1963 he was employed as a motorsports journalist, editor for Autosport magazine.

Residing in Lausanne on Lake Geneva, McNally then worked for Philip Morris's Marlboro as a sponsorship consultant. He and his wife, Anne "Twist" Downing, a Monte Carlo heiress, were part of the international racing set. He was briefly driver manager of Niki Lauda in the mid-1970s. Later, he was also a manager for James Hunt, a friend whom he "looked after" on behalf of Marlboro between 1977 and 1979.

By 1983, McNally had begun working with Bernie Ecclestone. In December 1983, he set up Allsport Management SA, a company that provided corporate hospitality and trackside advertising for Formula One events. Based in Geneva, Allsport and the related Allsopp Parker & Marsh (APM), registered in Ireland, owned the trackside advertising rights at Formula One circuits and operated the Formula One Paddock Club, the Grand Prix hospitality provider. Allsport also managed the podium ceremonies at Grand Prix races. In March 2006, he sold Allsport Management to CVC for an undisclosed figure. He remained chief executive until 2011, when he announced his retirement.

McNally was considered a principal architect of the commercial aspect of modern Formula One.

== Personal life and death ==
In 1967, McNally married Anne Downing, daughter of the wealthy racing driver Ken Downing; they had two sons, Sean and Rollo. They later separated, and she died from cancer in 1980. McNally dated Sarah Ferguson (formerly Duchess of York) between 1982 and 1985. She called him "the Toad" and hoped to marry him. The pair remained close friends. He was also linked romantically with Finnish fashion model Nina Rindt.

McNally owned chalets in the Swiss ski resort Verbier from 1980: the main of which, Les Gais Lutins, euphemistically named "the Castle", was dubbed "Cocaine Castle". Here he frequently hosted hedonistic parties. He also owned a villa, Le Clos de Meaux, near Seillans in Provence, where guests included Diana, Princess of Wales.

In 1987, he acquired his principal residence, Sevenhampton Place in Sevenhampton, Wiltshire, the former home of James Bond author Ian Fleming. He also led a restoration project of the Georgian property Buckland House. In 2008, a grouse moor estate near Grantown-on-Spey, owned by McNally, was raided by Scottish wildlife police.

In 2017, McNally ranked 20th on The Sunday Times Irish Rich List and 206th in the UK, with an estimated fortune of €718 million.

In April 2026, it was reported that McNally's son Sean had died "very suddenly" in the Scottish Highlands, aged 56.

McNally died on 22 July 2026, aged 88. His funeral took place at St James's Church, Sevenhampton, on 14 August.
