= Sophia, Lady Burdett =

Wife of the British politician and heiress

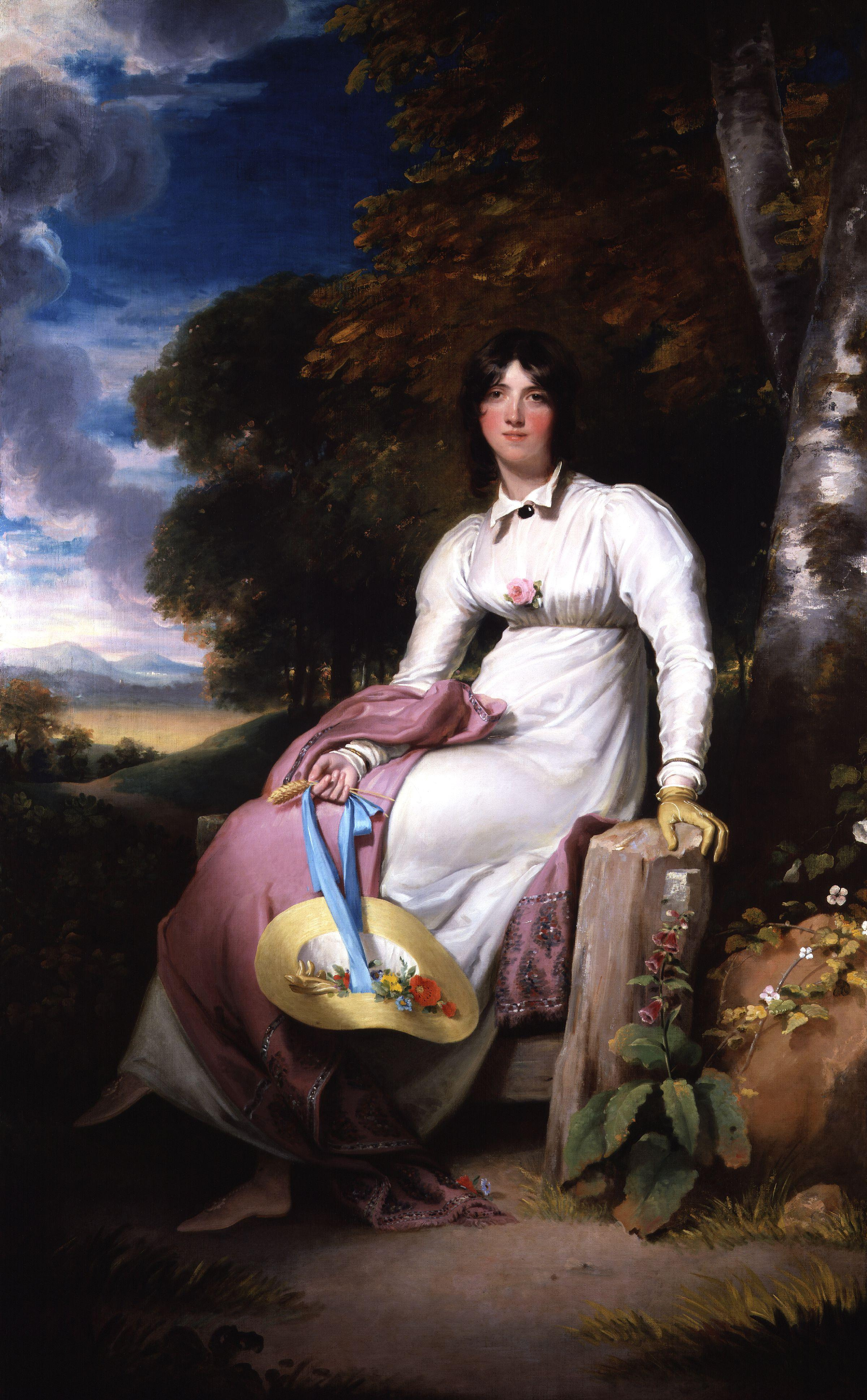
Portrait by Thomas Lawrence, c.1793

Sophia, Lady Burdett (1775–1844) was an English heiress and political hostess. Burdett and her sisters were known as the "Three Graces."

== Biography ==
Burdett was born in 1775 and was the third daughter of the wealthy banker Thomas Coutts, founder of Coutts & Co, and his wife Susannah Coutts (née Starkey). Burdett and her sisters were known as the "Three Graces." Her sister Susan Coutts married George Augustus North, 3rd Earl of Guilford, and her other sister Frances Coutts married John Crichton-Stuart, 1st Marquess of Bute.

In 1793 Burdett married the politician Francis Burdett, who inherited a baronetcy in 1798. Together, Burdett and her husband had a son and five daughters. Burdett was painted by Thomas Lawrence around the time of her marriage. A rising artist, Lawrence later became Britain's leading portrait painter and President of the Royal Academy.

Her husband was a leading Radical throughout most of his career, notably during the Regency era. His imprisonment in 1810 led to the Burdett Riots in London.

After the death of her mother in 1815, Burdett's father married the Irish actress Harriet Mellon, significantly reducing her inheritance. In 1822, her father died. Her stepmother became very wealthy, having been bequeathed his entire fortune, including his interest in the family bank. Burdett's youngest daughter, Angela Burdett-Coutts, 1st Baroness Burdett-Coutts was a phenomenally wealthy heiress, inheriting much of the Coutts fortune from her step grandmother. As a condition of the inheritance she adapted her surname to Burdett-Coutts.

Burdett died on 13 January 1844. Her husband, then twelve days short of his 74th birthday, became inconsolable and felt he had nothing left to live for. He refused all food and died just ten days later on 23 January 1844. He and his wife were buried at the same time in the same vault at Ramsbury Church, Wiltshire.
