= Couts =

Couts is a surname. Notable people with the surname include:

- Brandon Couts (born 1979), American sprinter and coach
- Cave Johnson Couts (1821–1874), US Army office and judge
- Kimberly Couts (born 1989), American tennis player
- Mary Couts Burnett (1856–1924), American philanthropist

== See also ==
- Coutts (disambiguation)
- Cout
