= Warneford Place =

Country house in Wiltshire, England

Sevenhampton Place
- Warneford Place
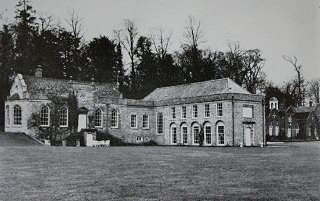
- Warneford Place, around 1963

- Location within Wiltshire

General information
- Location: Sevenhampton, United Kingdom
- Coordinates: 51°36′44″N 1°42′04″W
- Completed: 17th century
- Renovated: 1963
- Owner: Patrick McNally

Warneford Place, also known as Sevenhampton Place, is a Grade II listed country house in Sevenhampton, south of Highworth, in Wiltshire, England.

== Country house ==
The main house is modern but is listed because it incorporates some features from the original 18th-century mansion. Warneford Place dates back to at least the 16th century during the reign of Elizabeth I, and was home to the Warneford family. That family, although often impoverished, had been established in the area since around the 12th century and owned much of its land. The house was often empty and neglected. In 1902, there was an auction of the Warneford Place Estate and its contents. The house has been Grade II listed (as Warneford Place) since 1979. It was home to the politician and animal rights activist Lord Banbury, who died there in 1936.

In 1960, the James Bond author Ian Fleming bought the "demolished Warneford Place", and built a new house which he named Sevenhampton Place, incorporating some elements of the original building. He did not move in until the new house was completed in 1963 and spent little time there. He died in 1964, aged 56, and is buried in the Sevenhampton churchyard, along with his wife Ann and son Caspar. His widow Ann Fleming lived at Sevenhampton Place until she died there on 12 July 1981.

In 1987, the house was bought by the Formula One businessman Patrick McNally for £7 million. In 2004, the house was robbed by The Johnson Gang, a group of notorious gypsy criminals, who stole items to the value of £750,000.
