= Mary G. Burdette =

- Born: 1842; Greensboro, Pennsylvania
- Died: 1907 (aged 64–65)
- Occupations: Baptist teacher; preceptor; writer; missionary leader

Mary G. Burdette (1842 - 1907) was an American Baptist teacher, preceptor, writer and missionary leader.

== Biography ==
Burdette was born in Greensboro, Pennsylvania and grew up in Peoria, Illinois. Robert J. Burdette was her brother.

She was the secretary for the Women's American Baptist Home Missionary Society. In 1881, the society established the Baptist Missionary Training School and appointed Burdette its leader for the first six years. She then became one of three women who administered the school.

She also edited the society's publication Tidings and traveled extensively in the U.S. for her work. She wrote and edited several articles including A Trip Through Indian Country (1863), Home Mission Lessons, "Sunlight Mission : sought, sound, opened", "Cuba : discovered, degraded, delivered (1911), "Twenty-two years' work among Mormons", "Work in Mexico : 1885-1905", and Young women among blanket Indians (1895).

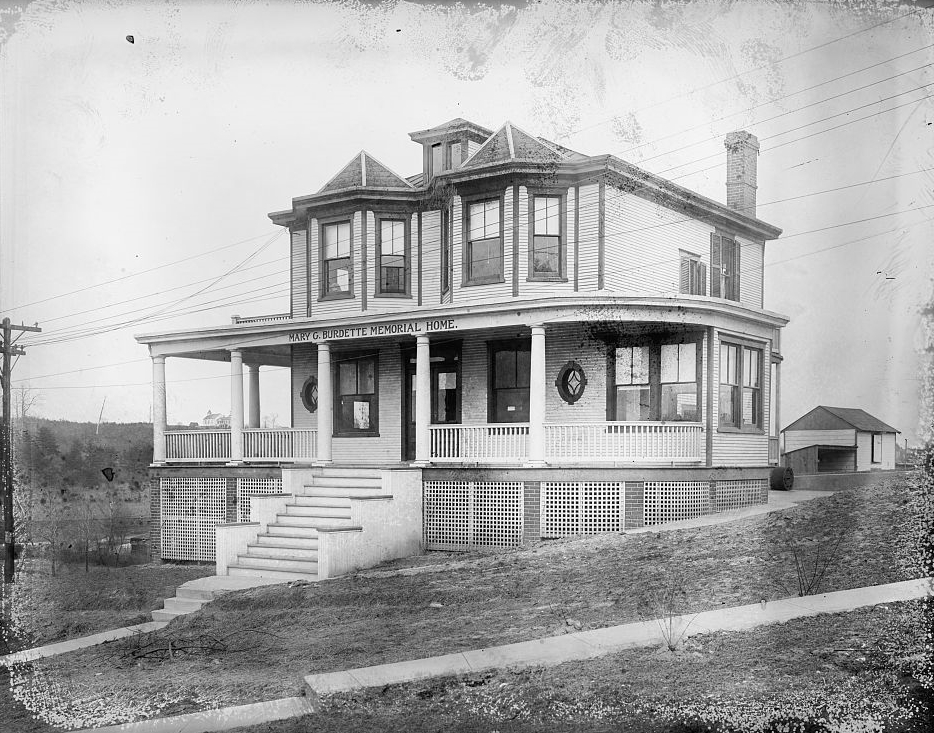
Mary G. Burdette Memorial Home, the National Training School for Women and Girls, glass negative

The Mary G. Burdette Memorial Home, a gift of the Women's Baptist Missionary Society, was used as the National Training School for Girls in Washington.

== See also ==
- American Baptist Home Mission Society
