= Burdette Keeland =

American architect

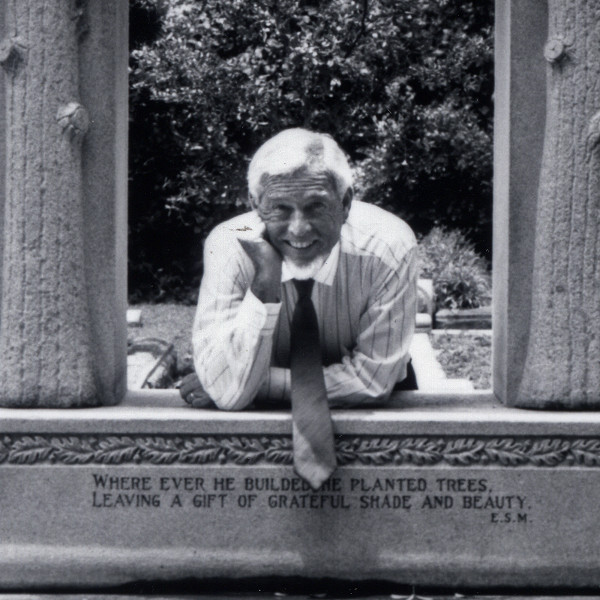
Burdette Keeland Jr. leaning forward in memorial.

Burdette Keeland, Jr. (February 2, 1926 – May 26, 2000) was an American architect and professor from Houston whose work was admired by Philip Johnson. Predominantly a modernist, he designed several projects from the 1950s through the 1970s.

Keeland was born in 1926 in the town of Mart, Texas—just outside Waco. He served in the Army Air Forces during World War II. Keeland initially attended Texas A&M University and later enrolled at the University of Houston where he received a Bachelor of Architecture degree in 1950. He returned to the University of Houston as a faculty member in 1954, but briefly left the university in order to attend Yale University and received a master's degree.

Keeland was an architecture professor at the University of Houston for over 40 years. He was also a member of the City of Houston's Planning Commission for over 30 years. He married Margaret Scott—a teacher who attended Rice University and The University of Texas. They had three girls and a boy. His son, Burdette Keeland III, lives in Houston and is a well known contractor.

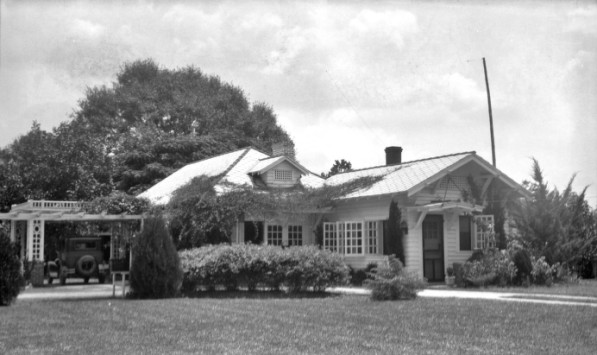
Angled view of a house, Burdette Kelland Architectural Papers (circa 1910–1949, Houston, Harry Walker, photographer)

Keeland died in January 2000. In his memory, the Gerald D. Hines College of Architecture at the University of Houston created the Burdette Keeland Jr Design Exploration Center.
