= Burdette, West Virginia =

Unincorporated community in West Virginia, United States

- Unincorporated community
- Location within West Virginia Location within the United States
- Coordinates: 38°03′47″N 80°47′58″W
- Country: United States
- State: West Virginia
- County: Greenbrier
- Elevation: 2,267 ft (691 m)
- Time zone: UTC-5 (Eastern (EST))
  - Summer (DST): UTC-4 (EDT)
- Area codes: 304 & 681
- GNIS feature ID: 1554029

Burdette is an unincorporated community in the Greenbrier County of West Virginia, United States. Burdette is located on the Meadow River, 5 miles (8.0 km) west of Quinwood.
