= Christiana Burdett Campbell =

American businessperson (1723–1792)

Christiana Burdett Campbell (c. 1723 – March 25, 1792) was a colonial innkeeper from Williamsburg, Virginia. She started the business herself in an era where it was unusual for women to do so in the colony. A replica of her tavern was built in Colonial Williamsburg and currently serves as a popular tourist attraction and restaurant.

In 2012 Campbell was honored by the Library of Virginia as one of their Virginia Women in History for the year.

== Personal life ==
Campbell was born around 1723 to John and Mary Burdett of Williamsburg. Her father worked as an innkeeper in a tavern on Duke of Gloucester Street, where Campbell learned the skills that would assist her in her future career. Campbell would later move to Petersburg with her husband Ebenezer Campbell, whom she married at some point after September 21, 1747. Her husband worked as an apothecary in Blandford, a position he held until his death around 1752. They had two female children together, the latter of whom was named after her father and who may have been born after his death. Following her husband's death Campbell sold his belongings and moved back to Williamsburg in 1753, where she had one of her slaves, London, baptized. Along with the conversion of many of her slaves, Campbell was also interested in providing them with basic literary training, a move that was atypical for an era where some areas strictly forbade the education of slaves.

Campbell died on March 25, 1792, and was buried in Fredericksburg.

== Innkeeping ==
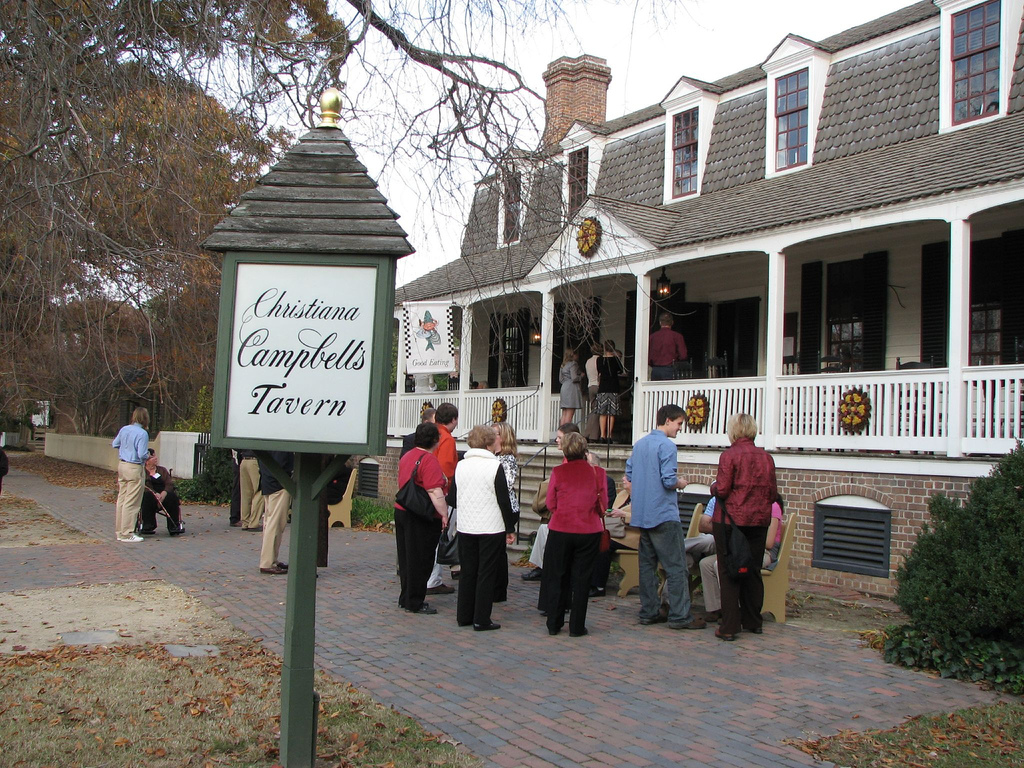
Reconstruction of Christiana Campbell's tavern in Colonial Williamsburg

After she returned to Williamsburg Campbell began working as an innkeeper. She rented several tavern locations before moving to her permanent location in 1771, a one-story tavern that had a large public room, cellar, and a separate kitchen structure. Campbell initially rented this location as well, but she finalized a purchase of the land in 1774. This purchase was a sign of Campbell's prosperity in her business and was also helped along by a bequest given to her by Nathaniel Walthoe, who had served as her landlord in the past and from whose estate she purchased her current property.

During this time Williamsburg served as the capitol of the Colony of Virginia and as such, her tavern was often frequented by important political figures of the day. Thomas Jefferson and George Washington were both patrons of the establishment and many members of the House of Burgesses stayed in Campbell's tavern while the General Assembly was in session. Women visited taverns infrequently as these locations were considered inappropriate for ladies. However innkeeping was seen as an acceptable vocation for women during this time period.

Campbell's business suffered after the state capital was moved to Richmond in April 1780. Nonetheless, the innkeeper chose to remain in Williamsburg. She retired from the innkeeping profession by 1783 and unsuccessfully attempted four years later to sell her real estate in Williamsburg. Soon thereafter she moved to Fredericksburg to be close to her youngest daughter. Campbell's tavern burned down around 1859 and a replica, built by the Colonial Williamsburg Foundation, opened in Colonial Williamsburg on April 16, 1956.
