= Coutts (disambiguation) =

Coutts is a UK private banking house.

Coutts may also refer to:

== Places ==
- Coutts, Alberta, a village in Alberta, Canada
  - Sweetgrass–Coutts Border Crossing, a major border crossing between Alberta and Montana

== Other uses ==
- Coutts (surname)
- Coutts (1797 EIC ship)

== See also ==
- Couts (disambiguation), various meanings
- Coot, a water fowl
- Coutts Crossing, New South Wales, a village in New South Wales, Australia
- Coutts Inlet, Nunavut, Canada
