= Burdett Coutts =

Singaporean field hockey player

Personal information
- Full name: Burdett Matthew Coutts
- Nationality: Singaporean
- Born: 21 September 1919 Kochi, British India
- Died: 17 March 2016 (aged 96) Clacton-on-Sea, England

Sport
- Sport: Field hockey

Burdett Matthew Coutts (21 September 1919 – 17 March 2016) was an Indian-born Singaporean field hockey player. He competed in the men's tournament at the 1956 Summer Olympics.
