= George Burdett (priest) =

George Burdett was an Anglican priest in Ireland in the second half of the 17th century.

Burdett was educated at Trinity College, Dublin. He was Chancellor of Leighlin from 1666 to 1668; and Dean of Leighlin from 1668 until his death in 1671.
