= Burthwaite =

Village in Cumbria, England

Coordinates: 54.83°N 02.92°W

- Location in the former Carlisle district, Cumbria Location within Cumbria
- OS grid reference: NY4149
- Civil parish: St Cuthbert Without
- Unitary authority: Cumberland
- Ceremonial county: Cumbria
- Region: North West
- Country: England
- Sovereign state: United Kingdom
- Post town: CARLISLE
- Postcode district: CA4
- Dialling code: 01697
- Police: Cumbria
- Fire: Cumbria
- Ambulance: North West
- UK Parliament: Carlisle

Burthwaite is a village in Cumbria, England.

The history of Burthwaite is synonymous with the history of Blackhall Park Estate also called Blackwell Park in some records. Until recent times the owner of Blackhall Park also owned all eight cottages, the two farms of Orchard House, Burthwaite Croft and the small holding of Burthwaite Villa (now Thwaite House). A website of the history researched by villagers is at http://burthwaite.weebly.com/

This historical report begins with the birth of John Pearson christened on 23 Oct 1787 son of Adam Pearson farmer of Bell Bridge Sebergham, his wife Elizabeth.
