= Thomas Burdett =

Thomas Burdett may refer to:

- Sir Thomas Burdett, 1st Baronet, of Bramcote (1585–c. 1647), English sheriff and baronet
- Sir Thomas Burdett, 1st Baronet, of Dunmore (1668–1727), Irish politician and baronet
- Tommy Burdett (1915–2001), English footballer
