= Clara Burdette =

American clubwoman and philanthropist

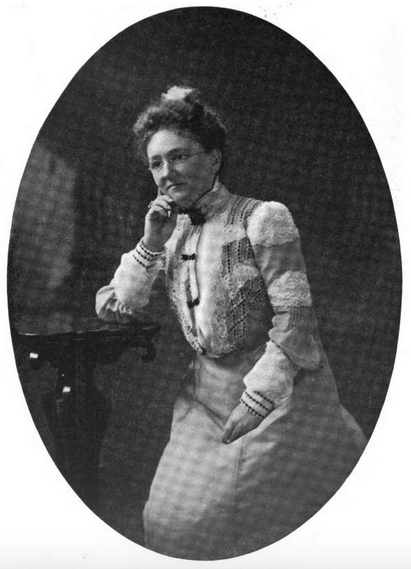
- Clara Burdette, 1903
- Born: Clara Bradley; July 22, 1855; East Bloomfield, New York]
- Died: January 6, 1954 (aged 98); Los Angeles County, California
- Education: Syracuse University
- Occupations: Suffragist, Pastoress

Clara Bradley Baker Wheeler Burdette (July 22, 1855 — January 6, 1954) was an American clubwoman and philanthropist based in Pasadena, California. She was the first president of the California Federation of Women's Clubs.

== Early life ==
Clara Bradley was born in East Bloomfield, New York, the daughter of Albert H. Bradley and Laura Coville Bradley. She attended Syracuse University, graduating in the class of 1876. She was one of the founders of the Alpha Phi sorority while she was a student at Syracuse.

== Career ==
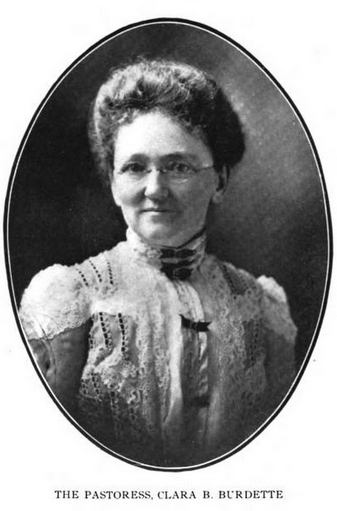
Clara B. Burdette, from her book, The Rainbow and the Pot of Gold (1908)

Clara Burdette was the first president of the California Federation of Women's Clubs when it was founded in 1900. She was also an officer of the General Federation of Women's Clubs from 1902 to 1904. She was active in politics, including the 1932 presidential campaign of Herbert Hoover, and in Pasadena social life. She was a major backer of the Pasadena Maternity Hospital. She was a founder, second president, and life member of the Ebell Club, a women's social and philanthropic organization in Los Angeles. She was director of the Southwest Museum and the Pasadena Humane Society. After suffrage was gained, she was an organizer of the national League of Women Voters and the Women's Legislative Council of California.

With her third husband and others, she was a founder of Temple Baptist Church in Los Angeles. As a pastor's wife, or "Pastoress" (her preferred title), she was busy in the life of the congregation, organizing the women's activities and serving on numerous committees, and taking a leading role in building the Philharmonic Auditorium, which would house the large congregation and become a major venue for musical and cultural events in Los Angeles. She wrote a book about her third husband and their church work together, The Rainbow and the Pot of Gold (1908). She also edited some of her writings as Robert J. Burdette, His Message (1923).

During World War I, she was involved with flood conservation in California, and was California field secretary for the Council of National Defense. In 1926, she was awarded an honorary doctorate from Syracuse University.

== Personal life ==
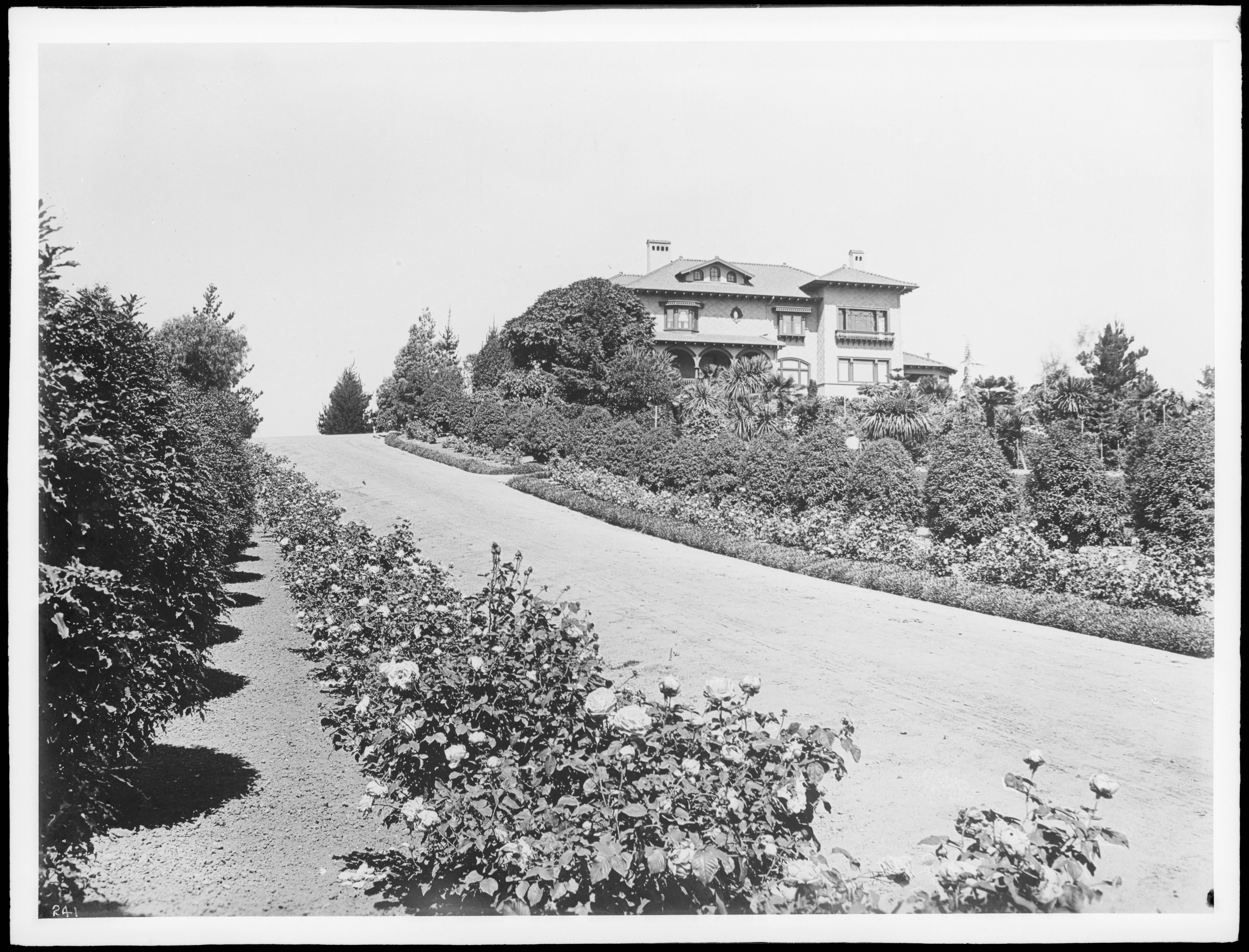
Home of Clara Burdette, before she married Robert, 1125 Sunnycrest and Orange Grove Avenue, Pasadena, ca.1895-1900 (CHS-241)

Clara Bradley married three times. She first married, in 1878, Nathaniel Milman Wheeler, a professor of Greek literature; they had a son, Roy B. Wheeler. The Wheelers moved to California for Professor Wheeler's health, but he died there in 1886. She married a second time, to Col. Presley Calvert Baker, in 1890; he died in 1893. In 1899 she married Robert Jones Burdette, a humor writer and lecturer who became an ordained Baptist minister. She was widowed a third time when Burdette died in 1914. She died in 1954, aged 98 years. Her papers are archived at the Huntington Library.

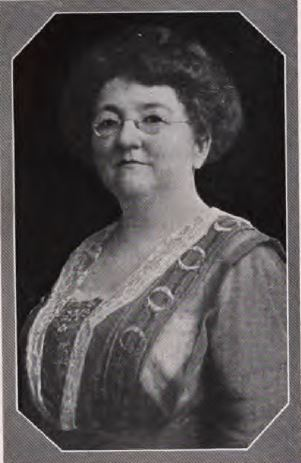
Clara Bradley Baker, Mrs. Robert J. Burdette, in Who's who among the women of California (1914)
