= Sevenhampton, Wiltshire =

Village in Wiltshire, England

Coordinates: 51.612°N 1.701°W

Sevenhampton
- Village
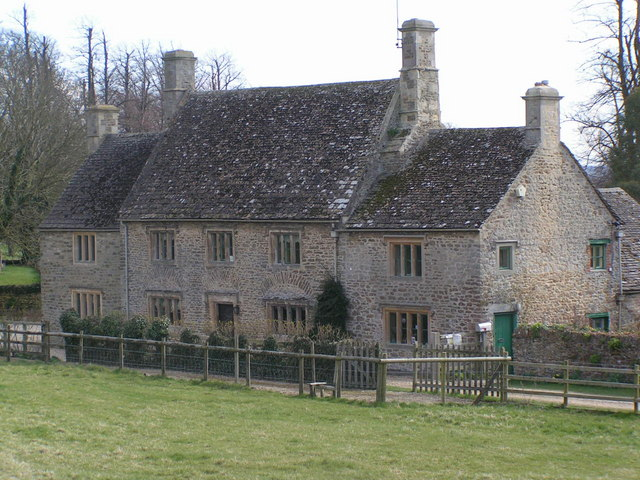
- Sevenhampton House

- Location within Wiltshire
- OS grid reference: SU208904
- Civil parish: Highworth
- Unitary authority: Borough of Swindon
- Ceremonial county: Wiltshire
- Region: South West
- Country: England
- Sovereign state: United Kingdom
- Post town: Swindon
- Postcode district: SN6
- Dialling code: 01793
- Police: Wiltshire
- Fire: Dorset and Wiltshire
- Ambulance: South Western
- UK Parliament: North Swindon

Sevenhampton is a small village in Highworth parish in the borough of Swindon, in the ceremonial county of Wiltshire, England. It is about 1.4 miles (2.3 km) south of the town of Highworth and 5 miles (8 km) northeast of central Swindon.

== History ==
In 1212 the toponym was recorded as Suvenhantone, meaning "town of the dwellers at a place called 'seven wells' or the like". The parish church is surrounded by earthworks marking the site of a medieval settlement, possibly including an earlier church. The site is a scheduled ancient monument.

The village and its surroundings were designated as a conservation area in 1990.

== Parish church ==
The Church of England parish church of St James (also recorded as St Andrew) was built in 1846 by W. Pedley, in the Early English style. Julian Orbach, updating Nikolaus Pevsner's work, describes the church as "over-large for the tiny village". There are two fonts: one from the 18th century in grey marble, and another ornately carved in the Victorian era by Thomas Earp, who also made the pulpit. Five of the six bells were cast by Rudhall of Gloucester in 1771.

The churchyard has the grave of Ian Fleming (1908–1964), the creator of the James Bond series of novels.

The church was originally a chapelry of St Michael's, Highworth. Today it is within the parish of Highworth with Sevenhampton and Inglesham.

== Notable buildings ==
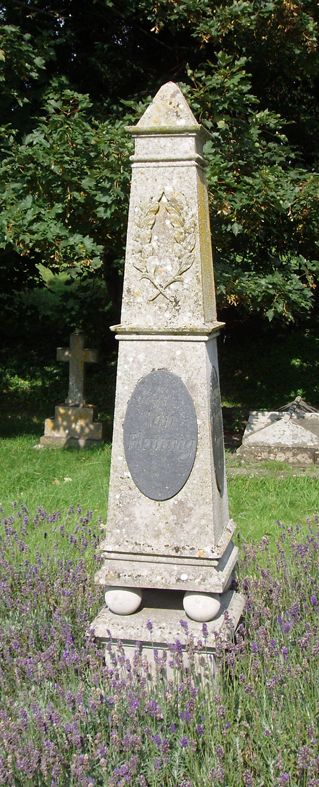
Ian Fleming's grave and monument at Sevenhampton

Sevenhampton House, near the church, is from the 17th century.

Warnford Place is a country house, southeast of the church, with grounds overlooking the River Cole. One wing of an 18th-century house survives, following remodelling by Lord Banbury in 1904. The house, then known as Sevenhampton Place, was owned by Ian Fleming and his wife Ann from 1960 until her death in 1981.

== Amenities ==
Central Hall Cricket Club is based in the village. Maranatha Christian School, a private school, is near Sevenhampton.

== See also ==
- Samuel Wilson Warneford, philanthropist
