= Burdett baronets =

There have been three baronetcies created for persons with the surname Burdett, two in the Baronetage of England and one in the Baronetage of Ireland. As of 2026, two of the creations are extant while one is extinct.

- Burdett baronets of Bramcote (1619)
- Burdett baronets of Burthwaite (1665)
- Burdett, later Weldon baronets, of Dunmore, County Carlow (1723): see Weldon baronets
