= 5, St James's Square =

Historic London townhouse with a tragic past

Coordinates: 51°30′29″N 0°08′06″W

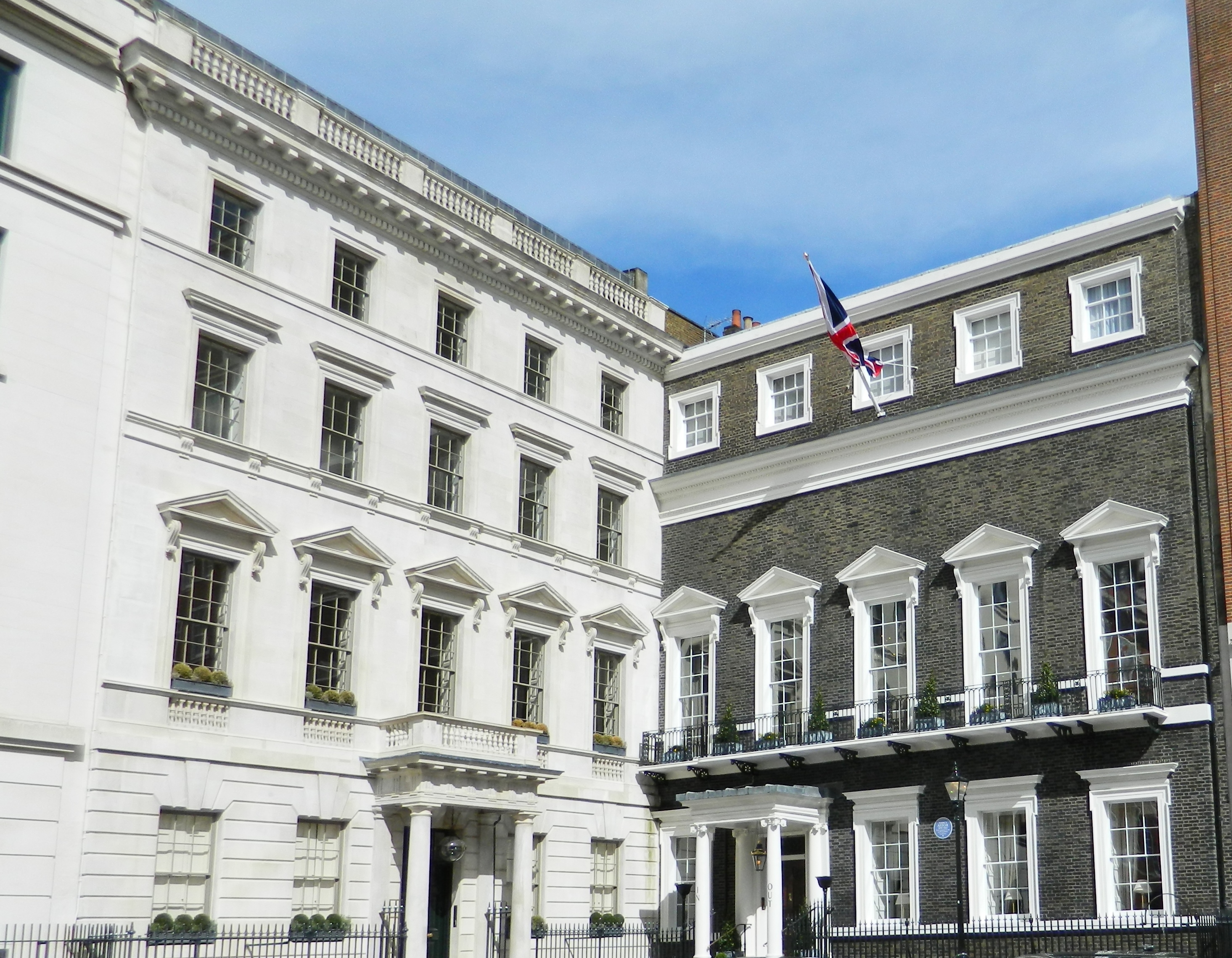
Left: Wentworth House, 5, St James's Square, London

5, St James's Square (anciently Wentworth House) is a Grade II* listed historic townhouse in London, England, built 1748–1751 by William Wentworth, 2nd Earl of Strafford (1722–1791) to the design of Matthew Brettingham the Elder. It remained the London residence of the descendants of his sister until after 1968, and in 1984 was the site of the "Libyan Peoples' Bureau" from which shots were fired which caused the murder of Yvonne Fletcher.

== Residents ==
The following persons were resident in successive houses on the site:

- 1676–1679 Henry Hyde, 2nd Earl of Clarendon (Lord Privy Seal, Lord Lieutenant of Ireland, &c.)
- 1680–1691 Elizabeth, Countess of Thanet
- 1692 Meinhardt de Schonberg, Duke of Leinster, K.G. (Commander-in-Chief)
- 1693–1695 Charles Lennox, 1st Duke of Richmond, K.G. (Master of the Horse)
- 1696 Charles Talbot, 1st Duke of Shrewsbury, K.G. (Lord Treasurer, &c. )
- 1697–1699 Edward Coke
- 1700–1701 Charles Beauclerk, 1st Duke of St Albans, K.G. (Captain of the Bodyguard)
- 1702 Lady Katherine O'Brien
- 1703 Empty
- 1704–1711 Sir Richard Child, 3rd Baronet

=== Wentworth and Byng families ===
- 1712–1739 Thomas Wentworth, 1st Earl of Strafford (1672–1739), K.G. (Ambassador at Berlin, First Lord of the Admiralty, &c.)
- 1740–1791 William Wentworth, 2nd Earl of Strafford (1722–1791), only son, who pulled down the old house and in 1748–51 rebuilt the surviving structure to the design of Brettingham. He married Lady Anne Campbell (c. 1715 – 1785), a daughter of John Campbell, 2nd Duke of Argyll, but died without progeny when the heir to his titles, but not to his estates, was his first cousin's son, Frederick Wentworth, 3rd Earl of Strafford.
- 1792–1794 Rt. Hon. Thomas Conolly (1737–1803), of Stretton Hall, Staffordshire and of Castletown House, County Kildare, Ireland, MP, son of Lady Anne Wentworth, sister of William Wentworth, 2nd Earl of Strafford (1722–1791). He was the grandson and eventual heir of William Conolly (1662–1729), of Castletown House, Speaker of the Irish House of Commons, reputed to be the wealthiest man in Ireland. He married Lady Louisa Lennox, a daughter of Charles Lennox, 2nd Duke of Richmond, but died without progeny.
- 1795–1847 George Byng (1764–1847), MP, of Wrotham Park and 5 St James's Square, son of Anne Conolly, sister of Thomas Conolly. Died without progeny.
- 1848–1854 Mrs. Byng, widow of George Byng (Harriet Montgomery, a daughter of Sir William Montgomerie, 1st Baronet, of Macbie Hill, Peebles,)
- 1855–1886 George Stevens Byng, 2nd Earl of Strafford (1806–1886) of the new creation, nephew and heir of George Byng (1764–1847) of Wrotham Park.
- 1887– George Henry Charles Byng, 3rd Earl of Strafford (1830–1898), eldest son.
- Henry William John Byng, 4th Earl of Strafford (1831–1899), brother.
- Rev. Francis Edmund Cecil Byng, 5th Earl of Strafford (1835–1918), brother.
- Edmund Henry Byng, 6th Earl of Strafford (1861–1951), son. He died without male progeny, leaving two daughters and co-heiresses. His titles, but not his estates, were inherited by his nephew Robert Cecil Byng, 7th Earl of Strafford (1904–1984).
- Lady (Florence) Elizabeth Alice Byng (1897–1987), eldest daughter, who was bequeathed by her father his two principal properties, Wrotham Park in Hertfordshire and 5, St James's Square. In 1928 she married Michael William M. Lafone of Kenya, whom she divorced in 1931, having had issue Julian Michael Edmund Lafone (born 1928).
- Julian Michael Edmund Lafone (born 1928), a barrister who in 1952 changed his surname by deed-poll to his matronymic "Byng", following a similar action by his mother following her divorce in 1931 and paternal inheritance in 1951. He attempted to evict his mother from Wrotham Park in a lawsuit presided over in the high court by Lord Oliver of Aylmerton. He inherited Wrotham Park and 5, St James's Square, and sold the latter, some time after 1968.
