= Thomas Conolly (1738–1803) =

Irish politician and landonwer

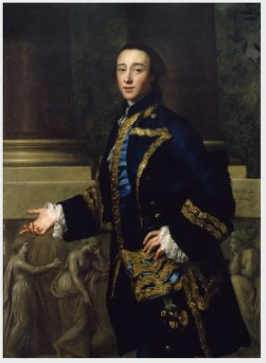

Member of the Parliament of Ireland
- In office 1761–1800

Member of the Parliament of Great Britain
- In office 1759–1780

Personal details
- Died: 27 April 1803
- Spouse: Lady Louisa Conolly

Thomas Conolly (Leixlip Castle, 1738 – 27 April 1803 Celbridge) was an Irish landowner and Member of Parliament.

== Early life ==
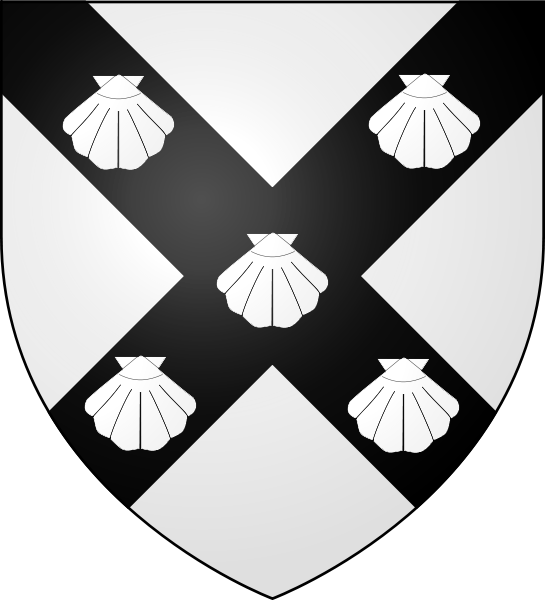
Arms of Conolly: Argent, on a saltire sable five escallops of the field

c.

== Career ==
Conolly sat in the Parliament of Great Britain for Malmesbury from 1759 to 1768 and for Chichester from 1768 to 1780. In 1761 he was elected to the Parliament of Ireland for Ballyshannon and for County Londonderry, sitting for the latter constituency until May 1800. On 6 April 1761 he was appointed to the Privy Council of Ireland. In Dublin, Conolly was a member of the Kildare Street Club.

== Property ==
=== Wentworth Castle ===
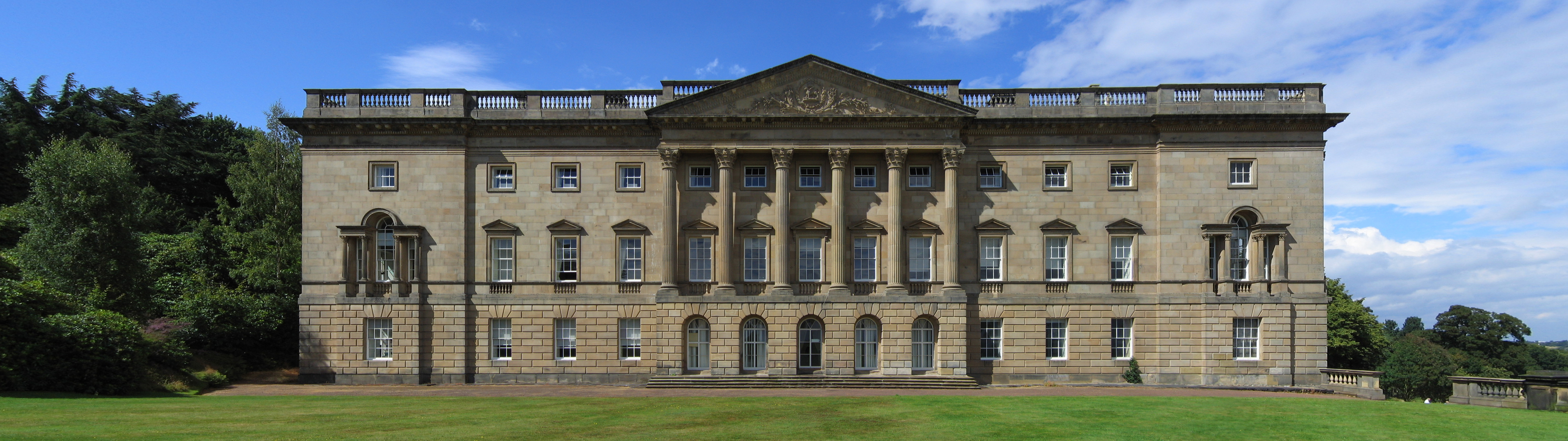
Wentworth Castle: Horace Walpole found the south front (finished 1764) evinced "the most perfect taste in architecture".

In 1802 Conolly was left Wentworth Castle by his second cousin Augusta Anne Hatfield-Kaye, sister of Frederick Wentworth, 3rd Earl of Strafford. On his death Wentworth Castle was inherited by Frederick Thomas William Vernon, grandson of the 1st Earl of Strafford's daughter Harriet Wentworth.

=== Castletown House ===
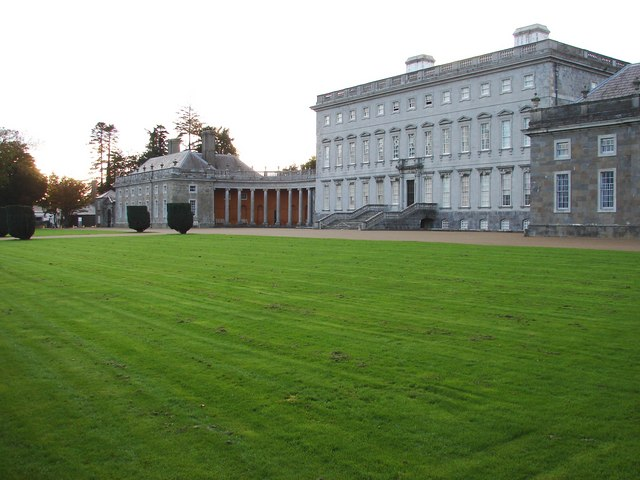
Castletown House

Castletown House passed to his widow Lady Louisa and then to Edward Pakenham, grandson of Conolly's sister Harriet Conolly, and was sold by William Conolly-Carew, 6th Baron Carew, in 1965.

=== Cliff House ===
The Conolly summer residence 'Cliff House' on the banks of the River Erne between Belleek, County Fermanagh and Ballyshannon, County Donegal was demolished as part of the Erne Hydroelectric scheme, which constructed the Cliff and Cathaleen's Fall hydroelectric power stations. Cliff hydroelectric power station was constructed on the site of 'Cliff House' and was commissioned in 1950.

=== 5, St James's Square ===
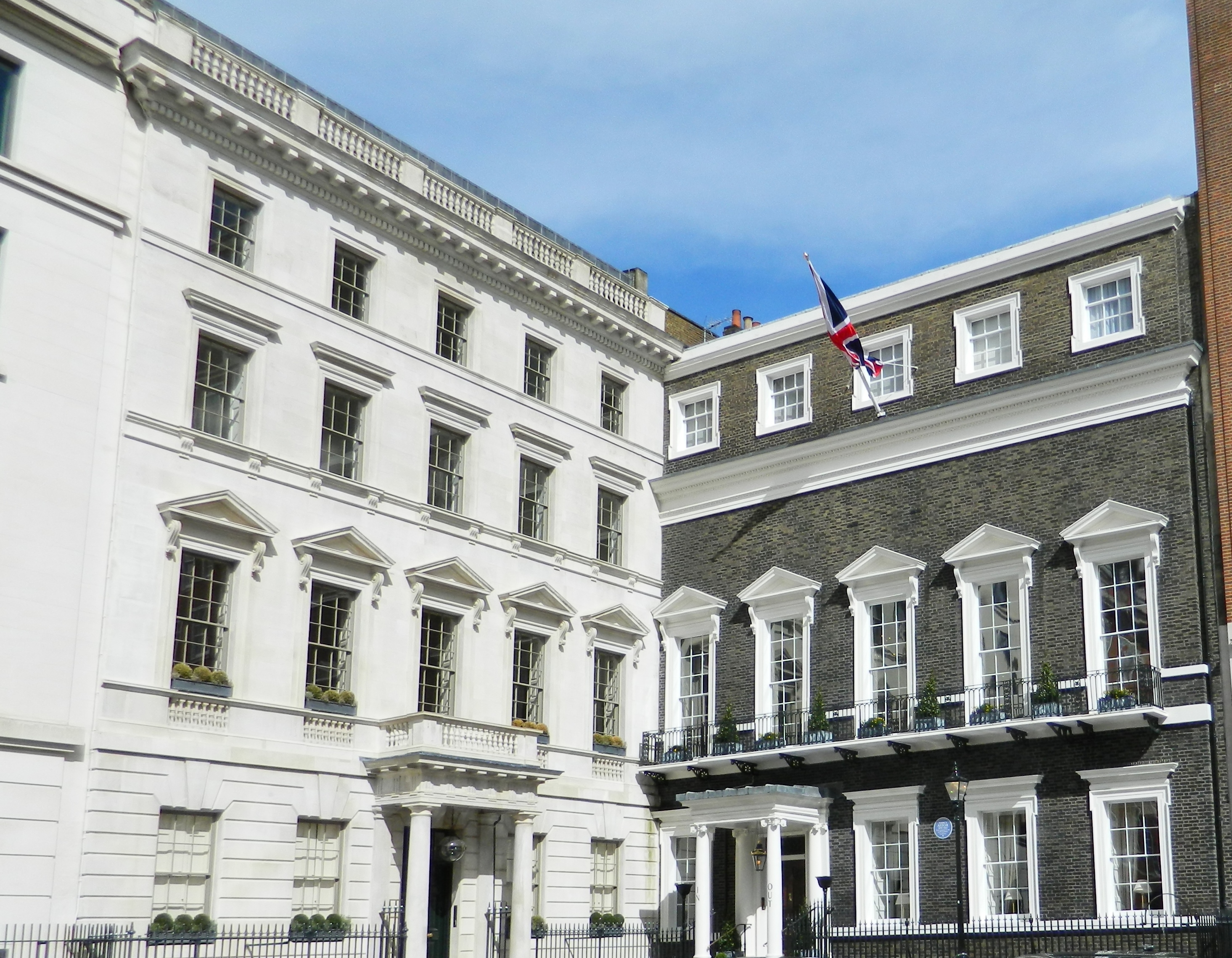
Left: Wentworth House, 5, St James's Square, London

Wentworth House, 5, St James's Square, Conolly's London townhouse, built by his uncle William Wentworth, 2nd Earl of Strafford (1722–1791), became the property of his nephew George Byng (1764–1847), the son of his sister Anne Conolly, whose younger brother was Field Marshal John Byng, 1st Earl of Strafford (1772-1860), elevated to the peerage in 1847 with the same territorial designation as the earldom of his maternal cousins, which earldom had become extinct in 1799.

Parliament of Great Britain
Preceded by Brice Fisher; Lord George Bentinck	Member of Parliament for Malmesbury; 1759–1768; With: Brice Fisher to 1761; The Earl Tylney 1761–68	Succeeded by Hon. Thomas Howard; Earl of Donegall
Preceded by William Keppel; John Page	Member of Parliament for Chichester; 1768–1780; With: William Keppel	Succeeded by William Keppel; Thomas Steele
Parliament of Ireland
Preceded by Michael Clarke; Edward Walpole	Member of Parliament for Ballyshannon; 1761; With: Michael Clarke	Succeeded by Michael Clarke; John Gustavus Handcock
Preceded by Edward Cary; Hercules Langford Rowley	Member of Parliament for County Londonderry; 1761–1800; With: Edward Cary to 1790; Henry Beresford, Early of Tyrone from 1790	Succeeded by Henry Beresford, Early of Tyrone; Hon. Charles William Stewart
