= Baron Raby =

Extinct barony in the Peerage of England

There have been two creations of the title Baron Raby, both in the Peerage of England. The first was in 1640, as a subsidiary title of the Earl of Strafford (first creation). The first earl was attainted and his peerages declared forfeit in 1641, but his heir obtained a reversal in 1662. On his death, all his peerages became extinct save the Barony of Raby, which continued until the death of the fifth baron in 1799. Confusingly, the third baron was again created Earl of Strafford in 1711, and the earldom and barony remained merged until their mutual extinction.

The title was created a second time in 1833 in the Peerage of the United Kingdom as a subsidiary title of the Duke of Cleveland (second creation). This creation became extinct in 1891 on the death of the fourth duke.

== Barons Raby, first creation (1640) ==
- Thomas Wentworth, 1st Earl of Strafford (1593–1641) (forfeit 1641)
- William Wentworth, 2nd Earl of Strafford (1626–1695) (attainder reversed 1662)
- Thomas Wentworth, 1st Earl of Strafford (1672–1739)
- William Wentworth, 2nd Earl of Strafford (1722–1791)
- Frederick Wentworth, 3rd Earl of Strafford (1732–1799) (extinct)

== Barons Raby, second creation (1833) ==
- see Duke of Cleveland (second creation)

== See also ==
- Baron Neville de Raby
