= William Wentworth, 2nd Earl of Strafford (1722–1791) =

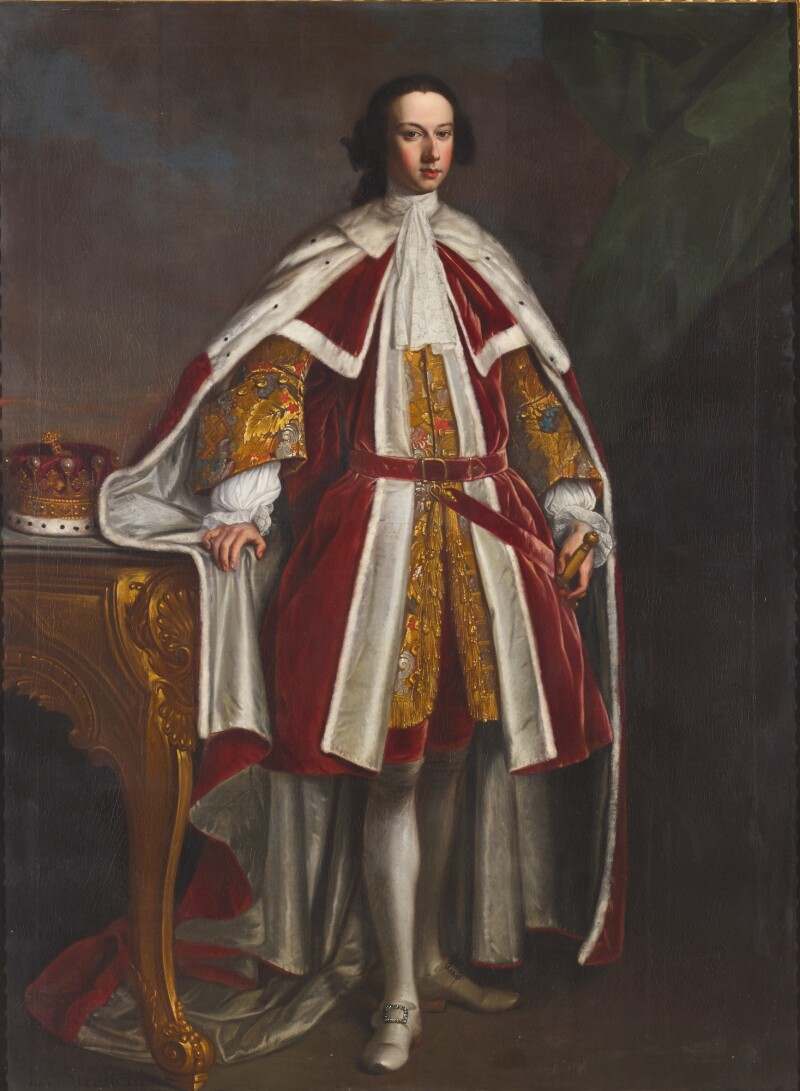
Portrait of Strafford by Thomas Bardwell

William Wentworth, 2nd Earl of Strafford (17 March 1722 – 10 March 1791), styled Viscount Wentworth until 1739 was a British peer.

== Ancestry and career ==
Strafford was the only son of Thomas Wentworth, 1st Earl of Strafford (1672-1739). His paternal great-grandfather was Sir William Wentworth of Ashby Puerorum, a younger brother of Thomas Wentworth, 1st Earl of Strafford of the earlier creation. His father was a cousin of William Wentworth, 2nd Earl of Strafford, who died childless, on whose death in 1695 he became the 3rd Baron Raby. However, the Strafford fortune, with the estate of the great Jacobean house of Wentworth Woodhouse, went to a nephew of the second Earl's. His mother was Anne Johnson, daughter of the wealthy politician and shipowner Sir Henry Johnson and his first wife Anne Smithson. Although his mother brought his father a fortune, it was generally agreed to be a very happy marriage.

The title of Earl of Strafford was created for the third time in 1711, for Strafford's father, and thus came to him on his father's death in 1739. He was also 2nd Duke of Strafford in the Jacobite Peerage. He played less of a political role than his father, although he was granted a farm of the post fines on 25 March 1756 and was appointed a deputy lieutenant of the West Riding of Yorkshire on 4 August 1757.

== Builder ==
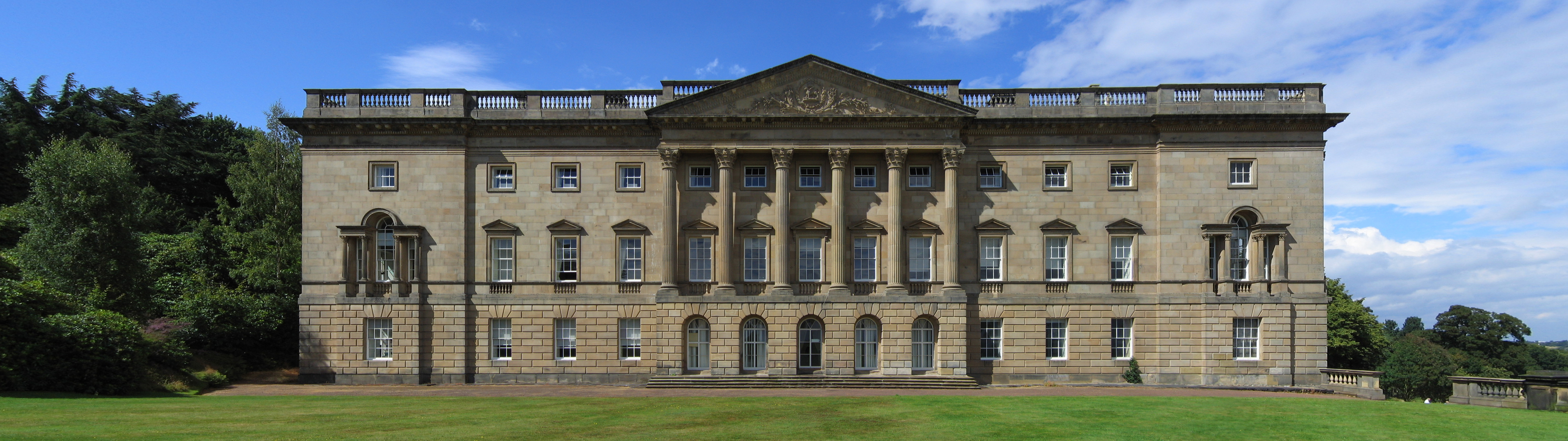
Wentworth Castle, near Barnsley in Yorkshire

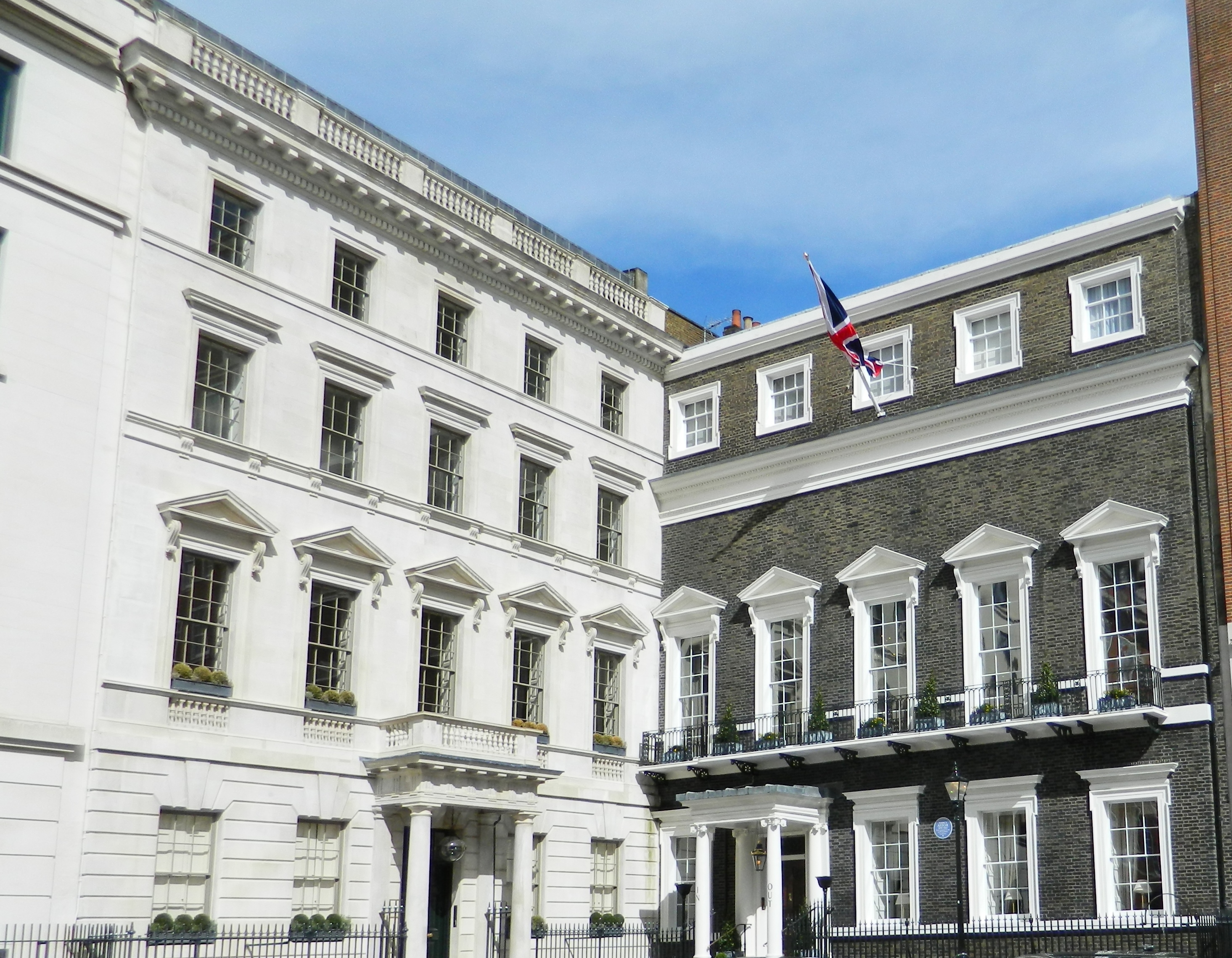
Left: Wentworth House, 5, St James's Square, London, townhouse built 1748–51 by the 2nd Earl to the design of Matthew Brettingham The Elder

Strafford added a neo-Palladian range to Wentworth Castle, his country house in Yorkshire, a project begun in 1759 and completed in 1764. As its principal designer, this gained him an entry in Colvin's Biographical Dictionary of British Architects.

Strafford's friend Horace Walpole described this south front on 2 August 1770, as showing "the most perfect taste in architecture":

If a model is sought of the most perfect taste in architecture, where grace softens dignity, and lightness attempers magnificence; where proportion removes every part from peculiar observation, and delicacy of observation recalls every part to notice; where the position is the most happy, and even the colour of the stone the most harmonious; the virtuoso should be directed to the new front of Wentworth-castle: the result of the same elegant judgement that had before distributed so many beauties over that domain, and called from wood, water, hills, prospects and buildings, a compendium of picturesque nature, improved by the chastity of art.

Between 1748 and 1751 he also built as his townhouse Wentworth House, 5, St James's Square, London, to the design of Matthew Brettingham The Elder. It remained the London residence of his descendants until after 1968, and in 1984 was the site of the "Libyan Peoples' Bureau" from which shots were fired which caused the murder of Yvonne Fletcher.

== Marriage ==
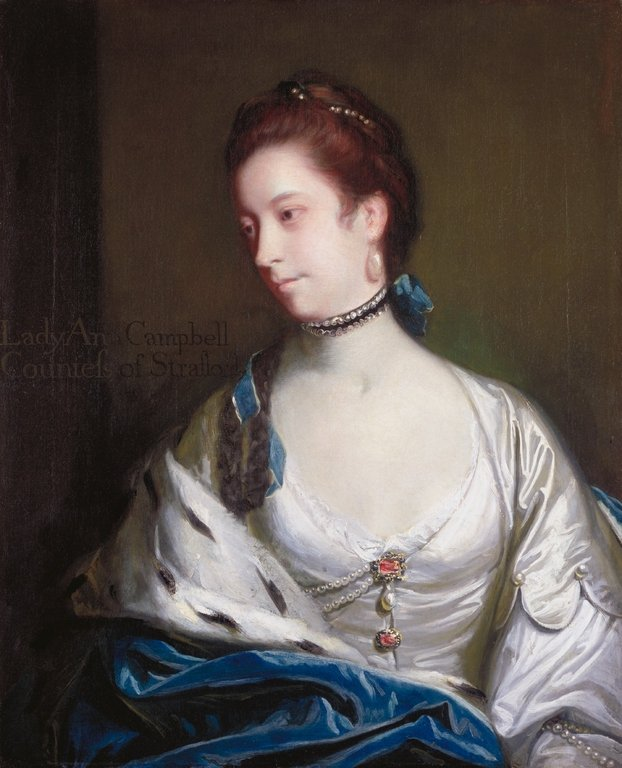
Anne, Countess of Strafford, by Joshua Reynolds (Minneapolis Institute of Arts)

In 1741, Strafford married Lady Anne Campbell (born about 1715, died 1785), the second of the five daughters of John Campbell, 2nd Duke of Argyll. The two became part of a social set which included Horace Walpole, who considered the countess to be a "vast beauty" and immortalised her in a poem which was published in 1765.

When Strafford was widowed in 1785, society gossip quickly linked his name with that of Lady Louisa Stuart (1757–1851), leading Lady Diana Beauclerk to remark "So Lady Louisa Stuart is going to marry her great-grandfather, is she?" However, Stuart looked on Strafford merely as an elderly uncle, and not as a suitor, and he for his part did nothing to promote such an alliance.

Strafford died without issue in 1791. He was succeeded by his first cousin's son, Frederick Wentworth, 3rd Earl of Strafford.

== Likenesses ==
Portraits of Strafford include one by Sir Joshua Reynolds which was engraved as a mezzotint by James Macardell. The copy of this in the National Portrait Gallery is erroneously described as 'William Wentworth, 4th Earl of Strafford (1722–1791)'.

Strafford's countess was also painted by Sir Joshua Reynolds.

Peerage of England
Preceded by Thomas Wentworth	Earl of Strafford; 2nd creation 1739–1791	Succeeded by Frederick Wentworth
