= Edmund Byng, 6th Earl of Strafford =

British earl (1862–1951)

Portrait by Walter Stoneman, 1921

Edmund Henry Byng, 6th Earl of Strafford, JP, DL, FZS, AMICE (27 January 1862 – 24 December 1951), styled Viscount Enfield between 1899 and 1918, of Wrotham Park in the parish of South Mimms, Middlesex (later in Hertfordshire) and 5, St James's Square, London, was an English peer.

== Origins ==
He was the second son (the first having died in infancy) of Reverend Francis Byng, 5th Earl of Strafford (1835–1918) by his wife Florence Louisa Miles (1840–1862), a daughter of Sir William Miles, 1st Baronet, who died giving birth to him.

== Career ==
He was a County Alderman in Middlesex and Hertfordshire. He was elected a Fellow of the Zoological Society of London (FZS) in July 1902. He was registered as an associate member of the Institution of Civil Engineers (AMCE). He held the office of Justice of the peace and Deputy lieutenant for the county of Middlesex.

== Marriage and children ==
He married Mary Elizabeth Colebrooke, a daughter of Sir Thomas Colebrooke, 4th Baronet by whom he had two daughters and co-heiresses:

- Lady (Florence) Elizabeth Alice Byng (1897–1987), eldest daughter, who was bequeathed by her father his two principal properties, Wrotham Park in Hertfordshire and 5, St James's Square in London. In 1928 she married Michael William M. Lafone of Kenya, the son of Major Edgar Mortimer Lafone (1867–1938), 4th Queen's Own Hussars and Chief Constable of the Metropolitan Police. Edgar's father was Alfred Lafone (1821–1911) of Hanworth Park, Middlesex, a wealthy leather merchant and Conservative Member of Parliament for Bermondsey. She divorced her husband in 1931, having had issue:
  - Julian Michael Edmund Lafone (born 1928), a barrister who in 1952 changed his surname by deed poll to his matronymic "Byng", following a similar action by his mother following her divorce in 1931 and paternal inheritance in 1951. He attempted to evict his mother from Wrotham Park in a lawsuit presided over in the high court by Lord Oliver of Aylmerton. He inherited Wrotham Park and 5, St James's Square. In 1960 he married Eva Finola Wellesley-Wesley, only daughter of Capt. Michael Wellesley-Wesley, of Tahilla, County Kerry, Ireland, by whom he had issue including:
    - Robert Michael Julian Wentworth Byng (born 1962), since 1991 owner of Wrotham Park.
    - Georgiana Margaret Elizabeth Byng (born 1964).
- Lady Mary Millicent Rachel Byng (born 1899), younger daughter, who married Major-General Robert Francis Brydges Naylor, by whom she had children:
  - Christopher Charles Francis Naylor (born 1929)
  - Edmund John Robert Naylor (born 1930)
  - Mary Elizabeth Katharine Naylor (born 1933)

== Succession ==
Upon his death in 1951, he was succeeded in the titles, but not in his estates, by his nephew, Robert Cecil Byng, 7th Earl of Strafford.

Peerage of the United Kingdom
| Preceded by Francis Edmund Cecil Byng | Earl of Strafford; 1918–1951 | Succeeded by Robert Cecil Byng |
