= Robert Naylor (British Army officer) =

British Army general (1889–1971)

Major-General Robert Naylor CB CBE DSO MC
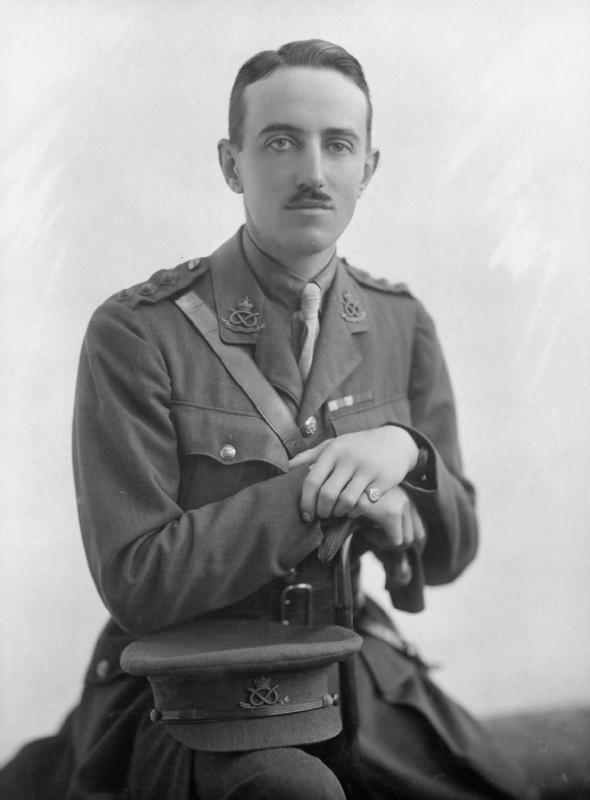
- Captain Naylor during the First World War
- Born: 6 October 1889
- Died: 23 December 1971 (aged 82)
- Military career
- Allegiance: United Kingdom
- Branch: British Army
- Service years: 1909–1946
- Rank: Major-General
- Service number: 19402
- Units: South Staffordshire Regiment; Royal Corps of Signals
- Conflicts: First World War: Western Front; Second World War: North-West Europe Campaign of 1944–45
- Awards: Companion of the Order of the Bath; Commander of the Order of the British Empire; Officer of the Order of the British Empire; Military Cross; Mentioned in Despatches (7); Legion of Honour (France)

Major-General Robert Francis Brydges Naylor, CB, CBE, DSO, MC (6 October 1889 – 23 December 1971) was a general officer in the British Army. During the Second World War he was Major-General in charge of Administration at the War Office from 1939 to 1941, Deputy Quartermaster-General from 1941 to 1943, Vice Quartermaster-General from 1943 to 1944, and Commander of the Line of Communications of the 21st Army Group in the North-West Europe Campaign of 1944–45.

== Early life ==
Robert Francis (Frank) Brydges Naylor was born on 6 October 1889, Son of Charles Topham Naylor. He was educated at Charterhouse School and the Royal Military College, Sandhurst, and was commissioned as a second lieutenant in the South Staffordshire Regiment on 18 September 1909. He was promoted to lieutenant on 1 April 1910. The 1st Battalion, South Staffordshire Regiment, with whom Naylor was serving, garrisoned Gibraltar from February 1911 until January 1913. He was seconded to the Royal Engineers Signal Service on 1 October 1912.

== Military career ==
During the First World War Naylor served on the Western Front, where he was mentioned in despatches seven times, and awarded the Military Cross. He was promoted to captain on 26 May 1915, and acting major on 15 March 1917, but relinquished the rank on ceasing to command a divisional signals company in November 1917. However, he was promoted to honorary major on 1 January 1918, and acting lieutenant colonel on 12 May 1918 as assistant director of signals at BEF GHQ. He was admitted to the Distinguished Service Order in the 1919 Birthday Honours.

After the war ended, Naylor relinquished his rank of lieutenant colonel on 29 March 1919, and reverted to his substantive rank of captain. When the Royal Corps of Signals was formed in 1920, he transferred to the new corps with the rank of captain, backdated to 26 May 1915. He attended the Staff College, Camberley, in 1921–22, and was brigade major of the Signals Training Centre from 1923 to 1925. He was promoted to the substantive rank of major on 20 November 1924. He then served in Malta from 1925 to 1927. On 20 October 1927, he married Lady Mary Millicent Rachel Byng, the daughter of Edmund Byng, 6th Earl of Strafford. They had two sons and a daughter.

His sister Eleanor Blanche Daphne Naylor married Lt.-Col. Arthur Francis Ferguson Davie, son of Sir William Augustus Ferguson Davie, 3rd Bt. Naylor served with the West African Frontier Force from 1928 to 1931. He was promoted to lieutenant colonel again on 15 February 1931, and commanded the 3rd Division Signals Company at Bulford, Wiltshire from 1931 to 1935. He was promoted to colonel on 15 February 1935. He was chief staff officer at Scottish Command in 1936 and 1937, and brigadier in charge of administration at Western Command from 1938 to 1939.

During the Second World War he was Major-General in charge of Administration at the War Office from 1939 to 1941, Deputy Quartermaster-General from 1941 to 1943, Vice Quartermaster-General from 1943 to 1944, and Commander of the Line of Communications of the 21st Army Group in the North-West Europe Campaign of 1944–45. He was made a Companion of the Order of the Bath in the 1942 Birthday Honours in June 1942.

Naylor became GOC 50th (Northumbrian) Infantry Division and the Northumbrian District in 1945 and served until he retired from the Army in 1946. He remained colonel of the Royal Signals until 1953. He died on 23 December 1971.

== Bibliography ==
- Smart, Nick (2005). Biographical Dictionary of British Generals of the Second World War. Barnsley, Yorkshire: Pen and Sword. ISBN 978-1-84415-049-6. OCLC 58555546.

Military offices
Preceded by Douglas Graham	GOC 50th (Northumbrian) Infantry Division; 1945–1946	Succeeded by John Churcher
