= Thomas Wentworth, 1st Earl of Strafford (1672–1739) =

British peer and diplomat

Lieutenant-General The Right Honourable The Earl of Strafford KG PC
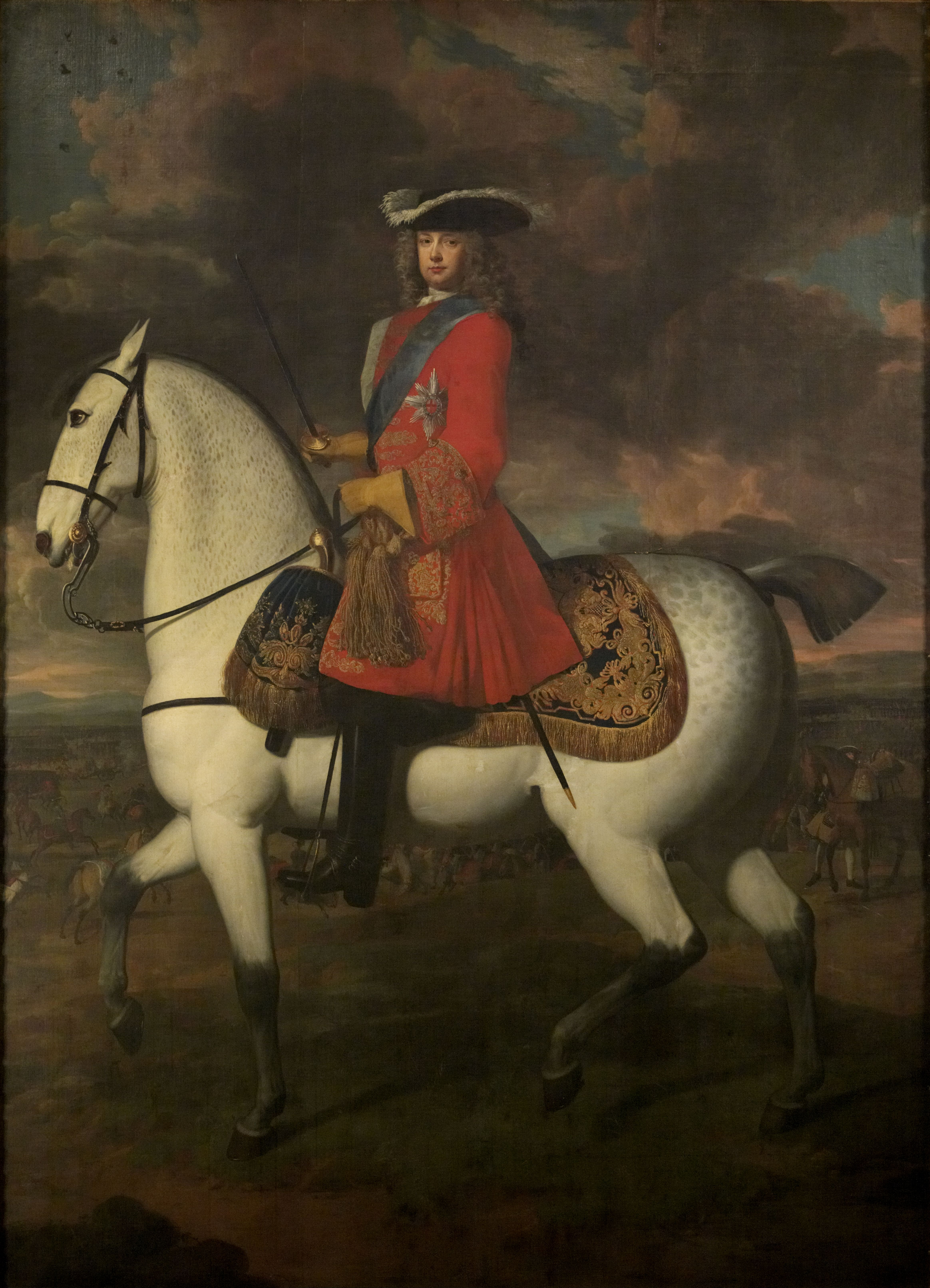
- Thomas Wentworth, 1st Earl of Strafford
- Born: c. 1672
- Died: 15 November 1739
- Military career
- Allegiance: United Kingdom
- Branch: British Army
- Service years: 1688–1715
- Rank: Lieutenant-General
- Unit: 1st (Royal) Dragoons
- Awards: Order of the Garter

Lieutenant-General Thomas Wentworth, 1st Earl of Strafford, KG, PC (baptised 17 September 1672 – 15 November 1739), also known in Jacobite Peerage as the 1st Duke of Strafford and 3rd Baron Raby from 1695 to 1711, was an English peer, diplomat and statesman who served as First Lord of the Admiralty.

== Background ==
Thomas was the eldest surviving son of Sir William Wentworth of Northgatehead—who served as High Sheriff of Yorkshire—and his wife Isabella Apsley, daughter of the prominent Royalist commander Sir Allen Apsley and his wife Frances Petre. His paternal grandfather, Sir William Wentworth of Ashby Puerorum, was a younger brother of Thomas Wentworth, 1st Earl of Strafford

His education seems to have been deficient; critics said that he was almost illiterate, by which they simply meant not reading Latin and ancient Greek and certainly, his spelling was appalling. This, combined with his reputation among his enemies as a very poor public speaker would lead many to question his qualifications to be a diplomat. He could read, write and speak French and German. Jonathan Swift said that while he was lively and spirited, he was "proud as hell".

== Military career ==
In about 1687, he was a page of honour to Queen Mary of Modena. On 31 December 1688, he was commissioned a cornet in Colchester's Regiment of Horse. Thomas Wentworth saw much service as a soldier in the Low Countries, and was occasionally employed on diplomatic errands. He fought courageously at the Battle of Steenkerque, and was wounded. For his good service he was appointed an aide-de-camp to King William in August 1692, was commissioned guideon and 1st major in the 1st Troop of Horse Guards 4 October 1693, and cornet and 1st major in the same 20 January 1694. On 7 May 1695, Wentworth was appointed a groom of the bedchamber to the king.

When his cousin William Wentworth, 2nd Earl of Strafford died without issue on 16 October 1695, Wentworth succeeded him as the 3rd Baron Raby. He did not inherit the Strafford fortune or the Jacobean house, Wentworth Woodhouse which passed to the second earl's nephew, Thomas Watson, son of his sister Anne.

Raby was commissioned colonel of the Royal Regiment of Dragoons in 1697 and appointed deputy lieutenant of Lincolnshire on 21 May 1700. He was employed as ambassador extraordinary to Berlin in March 1701, the first of several missions he undertook to Prussia. Under Queen Anne, Raby became a brigadier of horse on 7 January 1703 and a major general on 1 January 1704.

== Diplomat ==
In 1701 Raby was appointed on a special mission to congratulate Frederick I on assuming the title of King in Prussia. After ingratiating himself with the Prussian king, he went on to serve as Queen Anne's envoy (1703–1706) and then ambassador (1706–1711) to Berlin. Political manoeuvring by opposition factions at both the English and Prussian courts threatened his position, and in 1706, while not in Berlin, he received orders from the English government not to return. He nevertheless returned against orders and had a private audience with Frederick I, where he was able to convince him of his utility. Thereafter, the Prussian king issued demands that Raby should stay in Berlin with the rank of ambassador. Raby was in Berlin in 1709 when King Augustus of Poland and King Frederick IV of Denmark visited and tried to win Frederick I as an ally in the Great Northern War. The three kings dined at his ambassadorial residence, and Raby received a painting of the three monarchs to commemorate his involvement. Throughout his Berlin embassy, Frederick I, King in Prussia repeatedly utilised Raby's presence to legitimise his newly acquired royal status. In Berlin, Raby also secured the services of Johann von Bodt and Thomas Eosander to design Wentworth Castle, at Stainborough in Yorkshire, built, largely directed by letter from a distance, from about 1710 to 1720. While serving abroad, on 1 January 1707, he was commissioned a lieutenant general. From March 1711 to 1714 he was the British ambassador at The Hague.

On 14 June 1711, he was sworn of the Privy Council, and on 29 June 1711 was created Viscount Wentworth of Wentworth-Woodhouse and of Stainborough and Earl of Strafford. From 1712 until 1714, Strafford was First Lord of the Admiralty, and in October 1712, was made a Knight of the Garter. After the death of Anne, he was one of the Lords Justices who represented George I until the new king arrived in Great Britain.

Strafford was a representative of Great Britain at the Congress of Utrecht, and in 1715 was impeached for his share in concluding the resulting treaty, but the charges against him were not pressed to a conclusion.

== Conspirator ==
Strafford retired to Wentworth Castle. He was a leading conspirator in the Atterbury Plot of 1720–1722 to restore the Stuarts to the throne, and was also a party to the Cornbury Plot of 1731–1735. The Pretender appointed him one of his "Lords Regent" in England and commander of the Jacobite forces north of the Humber. For his role in furthering the Jacobite cause, he was created "Duke of Strafford" in the Jacobite Peerage of England on 5 June 1722 by the Old Pretender. On the collapse of the Plot, the Government, while fully aware of his deep involvement, decided to take no action against him, and he lived out his last years in peace. He would occasionally still attend House of Lords debates, although he was a very bad public speaker.

== Marriage and issue ==
On 6 September 1711, he married Anne Johnson, daughter and heiress of Sir Henry Johnson of Bradenham in Buckinghamshire and of Toddington in Bedfordshire, a Member of Parliament for Aldeburgh in Suffolk, by his first wife Anne Smithson, daughter and heiress of Hugh Smithson of Friston and Aldborough, 3rd son of Sir Hugh Smithson, 1st Baronet, of Stanwick, Yorkshire (ancestor of Hugh Percy (Smithson), 1st Duke of Northumberland). Anne brought him a dowry rumoured to be £60,000. The marriage was both advantageous and happy and her letters show their deep mutual affection. By his wife he had issue, one son and three daughters as follows:

- William Wentworth, 2nd Earl of Strafford (1722–1791), son and heir;
- Anne Wentworth, who married William James Conolly;
- Lucy Wentworth, who married Sir George Howard;
- Henrietta Wentworth, who married Henry Vernon (1718–1765) of Hilton in Staffordshire, by whom she had issue, including Henrietta, Lady Grosvenor.

== Death and succession ==
Thomas Wentworth died on 15 November 1739 of kidney stones, after years of failing health and was succeeded in his titles by his only son William Wentworth, 2nd Earl of Strafford (1722–1791).

== Notes ==
Military offices
Preceded by Edward Matthews	Colonel of The Royal Regiment of Dragoons; 1697–1715	Succeeded by The Lord Cobham
Diplomatic posts
Unknown	British Ambassador to Prussia; 1705–1711	Unknown Next known title holder: The Earl of Forfar
Preceded by The Viscount Townshend	British Ambassador to the Netherlands; 1711–1714	Succeeded by William Cadogan
Political offices
Preceded by John Leake	First Lord of the Admiralty; 1712–1714	Succeeded by The Earl of Orford
Peerage of Great Britain
New creation	Earl of Strafford; 2nd creation 1711–1739	Succeeded by William Wentworth
Peerage of England
New creation	— TITULAR — Duke of Strafford; Jacobite peerage 1722–1739	Succeeded by William Wentworth
Preceded by William Wentworth	Baron Raby; 1st creation 1695–1739	Succeeded by William Wentworth
