= Earl of Strafford =

Earldom in the Peerage of Great Britain

Earldom of Strafford (Third creation)
- Arms of Byng, Earls of Strafford: Quarterly sable and argent in the first quarter a lion rampant of the second over all in bend sinister a representation of the colours of the 31st Regiment of Foot
- Creation date: 18 September 1847
- Creation: Third
- Created by: Queen Victoria
- Peerage: Peerage of the United Kingdom
- First holder: John Byng, 1st Baron Strafford
- Present holder: William Byng, 9th Earl of Strafford
- Heir apparent: Samuel Byng, Viscount Enfield
- Remainder to: Heirs male of the first earl's body lawfully begotten
- Subsidiary titles: Viscount Enfield; Baron Strafford
- Seat: Wrotham Park
- Motto: Tuebor (I will defend)

Arms of Wentworth, Earls of Strafford (1st and 2nd Creations): Sable, a chevron between three leopard's faces or

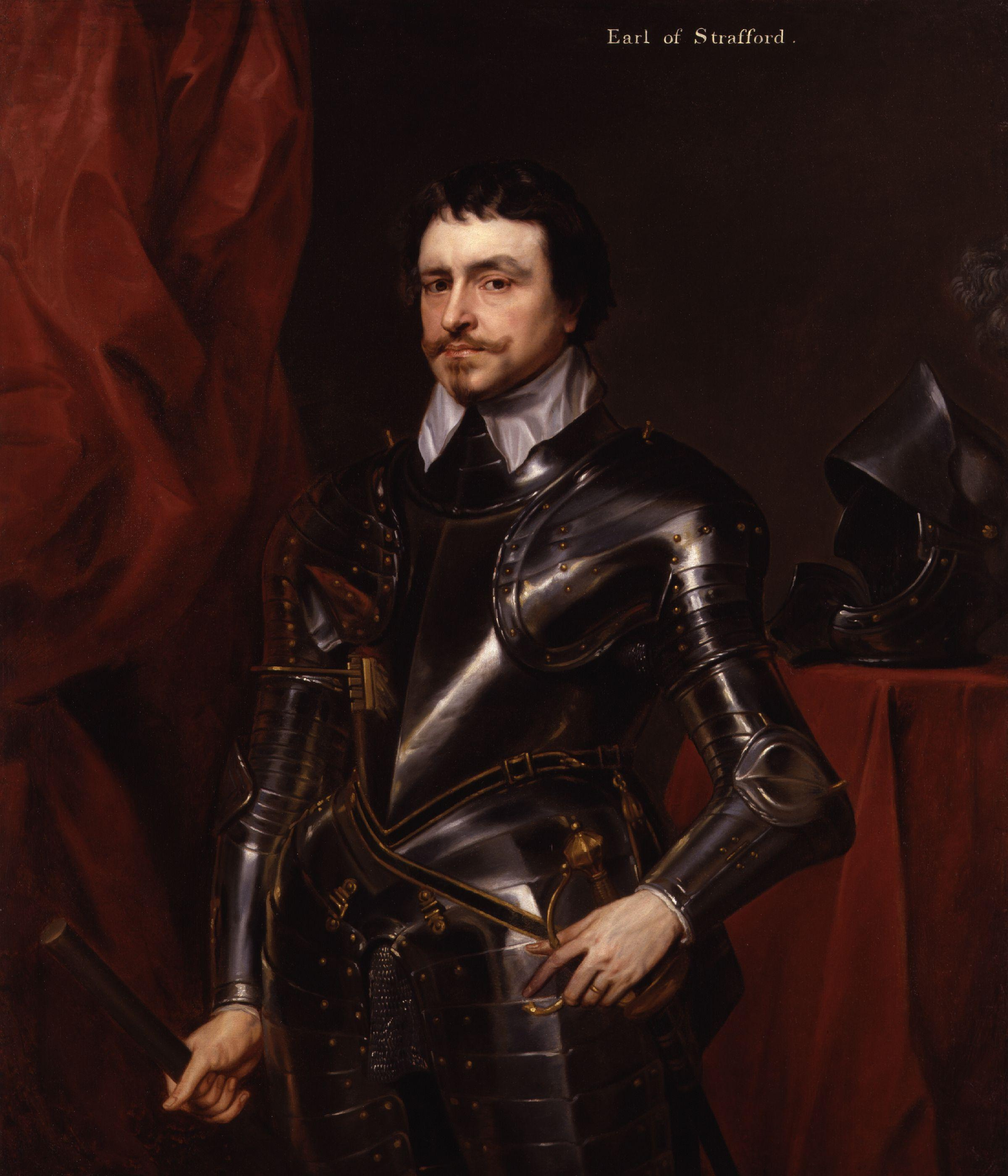
Thomas Wentworth, 1st Earl of Strafford (of the first creation)

Earl of Strafford is a title that has been created three times in English and British history.

The first creation was in the Peerage of England in January 1640 for the 1st Viscount Wentworth, the close advisor of King Charles I. Lord Wentworth had already succeeded his father as second Baronet of Wentworth Woodhouse in 1614. The Wentworth Baronetcy, of Wentworth Woodhouse in the County of York, had been created in the Baronetage of England on 20 June 1611 for Lord Wentworth's father, William Wentworth. The then Sir Thomas Wentworth, 2nd Baronet, was created Baron Wentworth, of Wentworth-Woodhouse, Baron of Newmarch and Oversley, in 1628, and Viscount Wentworth in 1629. He was made Baron Raby in 1640, at the same time he was given the earldom.

In 1641, Lord Strafford, as he then was, was attainted. His son, William, successfully had the attainder reversed in 1662, becoming the second earl, but died without heirs in 1695, when the barony of Wentworth, viscountcy and earldom became extinct. He was succeeded in the barony of Raby according to a special remainder by his first cousin once removed, Thomas Wentworth, who became the third Baron. He was the grandson of Sir William Wentworth, the younger brother of the first Earl of the 1640 creation. While gaining the barony, he did not receive the Woodhouse estate, which was inherited by Thomas Watson, thereafter a source of rivalry between the two men.

In 1711, the earldom was recreated when the 3rd Baron Raby was created Viscount Wentworth and Earl of Strafford in the Peerage of Great Britain. He was created Duke of Strafford in the Jacobite Peerage on 5 January 1722. He was succeeded in 1739 by his son, William, the second earl. William had no issue and on his death in 1791 the Jacobite peerages, such as they were, became extinct. He was succeeded in the remaining peerages by his cousin Frederick. As he also had no successors, all titles became extinct on his death in 1799.

The title was created for a third time in 1847 in the Peerage of the United Kingdom, when the prominent soldier John Byng, 1st Baron Strafford, was made Viscount Enfield, of Enfield in the County of Middlesex, and Earl of Strafford. He had already been created Baron Strafford, of Harmondsworth in the County of Middlesex, in 1833. John Byng was the second son of George Byng (c.1735-1789), son of the Hon. Robert Byng (1703–1740), third son of the 1st Viscount Torrington (1663–1733). John Byng's mother was Anne Conolly, whose mother was Lady Anne Wentworth, a daughter of the 1st Earl of Strafford (1672–1739; of the second creation). John Byng was thus a great-grandson of the 1st Earl of Strafford (by the second creation). John Byng was succeeded by his eldest son, the second Earl. He was a Whig politician and held minor office under Lord Grey, Lord Melbourne and Lord John Russell.

His eldest son, the third Earl, was a Liberal politician and served under William Ewart Gladstone as Parliamentary Under-Secretary of State for Foreign Affairs and Under-Secretary of State for India. In 1874, twelve years before he succeeded his father, he was summoned to the House of Lords through a writ of acceleration in his father's junior title of Baron Strafford. On his death the titles passed to his younger brother, the fourth Earl. He was succeeded by his younger brother, the fifth Earl. He was a clergyman. His son, the sixth Earl, was a County Alderman in Middlesex and Hertfordshire. He was succeeded by his nephew, the seventh Earl. He was the second but only surviving son of the Hon. Ivo Francis Byng, fourth son of the fifth Earl. As of 2016 the titles are held by his grandson, the ninth Earl.

Another member of the Byng family was the soldier, Field Marshal The 1st Viscount Byng of Vimy. He was the youngest son of the second Earl of Strafford from his second marriage. In addition to his military service, Lord Byng of Vimy served as Governor General of Canada and had a hand in a major constitutional crisis that set an important precedent for Canada and the other dominions or Commonwealth realms.

Family homes are divided up among its branches but Wrotham Park, historically in Middlesex but now Hertfordshire, and a 17th-century one-storey plus attic cottage in Vernhams Dean, Hampshire have become arguably established seats. Wrotham Park was named after the family's original estate in Wrotham, Kent, which they sold.

The traditional burial place of the Byng Earls of Strafford is the Byng Mausoleum at Wrotham Park, not to be confused with the Byng Mausoleum in Southill Church, Bedfordshire, built for the burial of the 1st Viscount Torrington, seated at Southill Park.

== Wentworth Baronets, of Wentworth Woodhouse (1611) ==
- Sir William Wentworth, 1st Baronet (d. 1614)
- Sir Thomas Wentworth, 2nd Baronet (1593–1641) (created Earl of Strafford in 1640)

== Earls of Strafford, First Creation (1640) ==
- Thomas Wentworth, 1st Earl of Strafford (1593–1641) (forfeit 1641)
- William Wentworth, 2nd Earl of Strafford (1626–1695) (attainder reversed 1662)

== Barons Raby (1640; Reverted) ==
- Thomas Wentworth, 3rd Baron Raby (1672–1739) (created Earl of Strafford in 1711)

== Earls of Strafford, Second Creation (1711) ==
- Thomas Wentworth, 1st Earl of Strafford (1672–1739)
- William Wentworth, 2nd Earl of Strafford (1722–1791)
- Frederick Thomas Wentworth, 3rd Earl of Strafford (1732–1799)

== Barons Strafford, of Harmondsworth (1835) ==
- John Byng (created Earl of Strafford in 1847)

== Earls of Strafford, Third Creation (1847) ==
- John Byng, 1st Earl of Strafford (1772–1860)
- George Stevens Byng, 2nd Earl of Strafford (1806–1886), son.
- George Henry Charles Byng, 3rd Earl of Strafford (1830–1898), son.
- Henry William John Byng, 4th Earl of Strafford (1831–1899), brother.
- Francis Edmund Cecil Byng, 5th Earl of Strafford (1835–1918), brother.
- Edmund Henry Byng, 6th Earl of Strafford (1861–1951), son.
- Robert Cecil Byng, 7th Earl of Strafford (1904–1984), nephew, married Clara Evelyne Wadia, sister of Bombay Dyeing chairman Neville Wadia
- Thomas Edmund Byng, 8th Earl of Strafford (1936–2016), father of Georgia Byng and Jamie Byng
- William Robert Byng, 9th Earl of Strafford (b. 1964)

== Present peer ==
William Robert Byng, 9th Earl of Strafford (born 10 May 1964) is the son of the 8th Earl and his wife Jennifer Mary Denise May, daughter of William Morrison May. Styled as Viscount Enfield between 1984 and 2016, he was educated at Winchester College and the University of Durham.

He succeeded to the peerages, including those of Viscount Enfield (1847) and Baron Strafford (1835) on 12 November 2016.

On 8 October 1994, he married Karen Elizabeth Lord, daughter of S. Graham Lord, and they have six children:

- Lady Saskia Ruth Jessica Byng (born 1996)
- Samuel Peter Byng, Viscount Enfield (born 1998), heir apparent
- Isaac John Byng (born 1998)
- Ruby Byng
- Esther Byng
- Florence Byng

== Arms ==
Coat of arms of Earl of Strafford
Crest 1st: out of a Mural Crown an Arm Embowed, grasping the Colours of the 31st Regiment of Foot and pendent from the wrist by a ribbon the Gold Cross presented by Royal Command for Lord Strafford's gallant achievements, all proper, and on an Escroll the word "Mouguerre"; 2nd: an Heraldic Antelope statant Ermine attired Or. Escutcheon Quarterly Sable and Argent in the first quarter a Lion rampant of the second, over all in bend sinister a representation of the Colours of the 31st Regiment of Foot. Supporters On the dexter side an Heraldic Antelope Ermine attired Or, and on the sinister side a Lion Or, Motto Tuebor (I will defend).

== See also ==
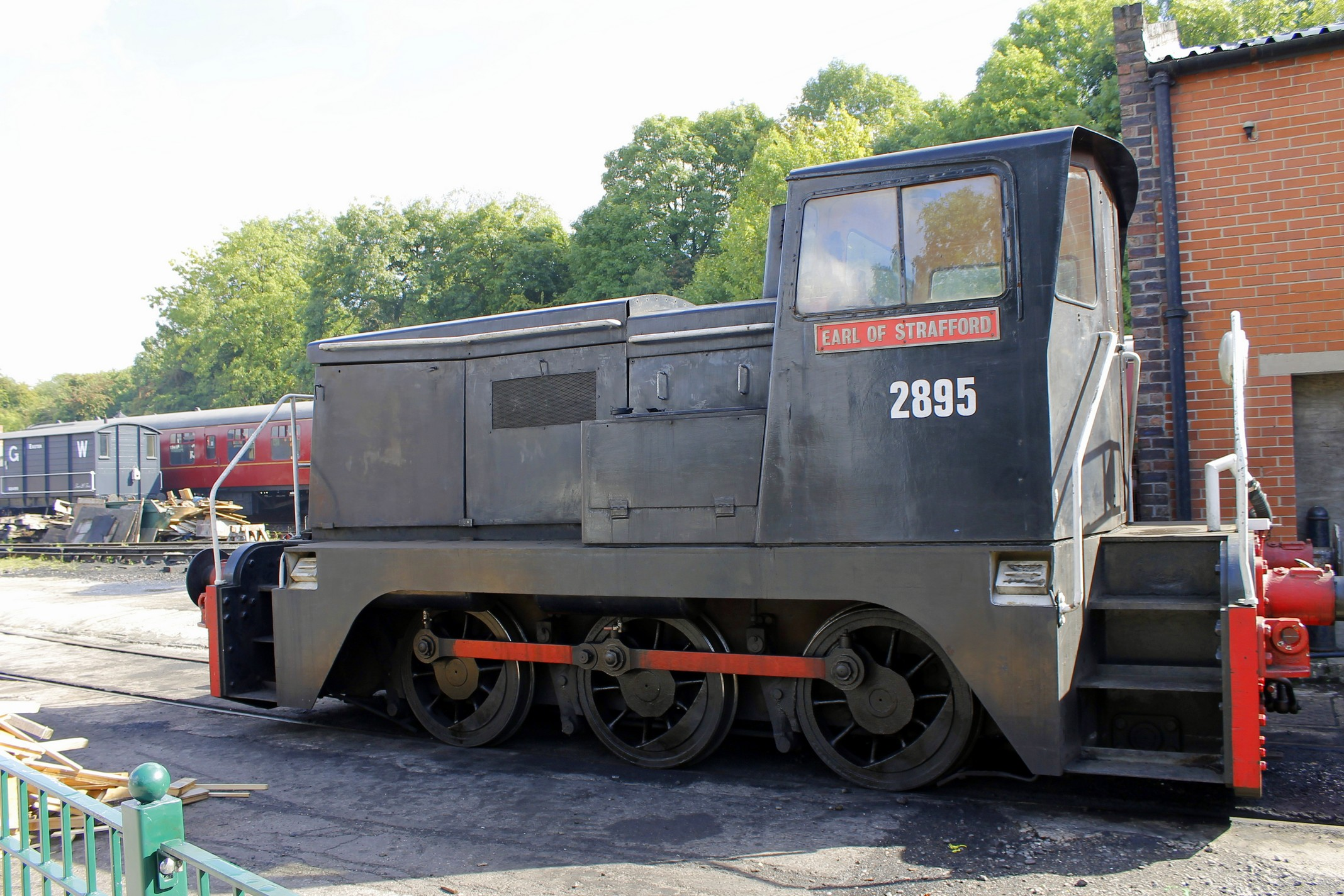
Diesel locomotive No 2895 Earl of Strafford of the Elsecar Heritage Railway

- Viscount Torrington
- Viscount Byng of Vimy

Baronetage of England
Preceded by Berkeley baronets	Wentworth baronets of Wentworth Woodhouse; 29 June 1611	Succeeded by Musgrave baronets
