= Francis Byng, 5th Earl of Strafford =

British earl (1835–1918)

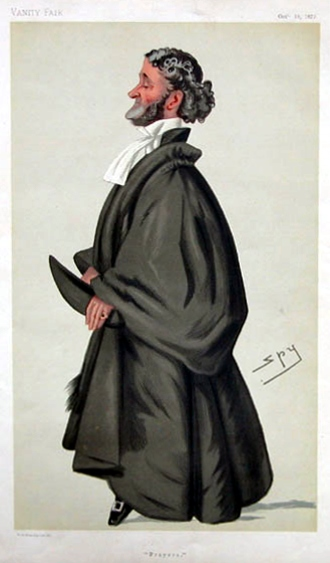
"Prayers" Byng as caricatured by Spy (Leslie Ward) in Vanity Fair, October 1879

Rev. Francis Edmund Cecil Byng, 5th Earl of Strafford (15 January 1835 – 18 January 1918) was an English Anglican minister and member of the peerage.

== Background ==
Byng was born 15 January 1835, third son of George Byng, 2nd Earl of Strafford. He was educated at Eton (where he took a Prince Albert Prize for Modern Languages) and Christ Church, Oxford, where he studied law and modern history.

== Religious career ==
After taking holy orders, Byng became the rector of Little Casterton, Rutland from 1859 to 1862; served as vicar of Holy Trinity in Twickenham and chaplain at Hampton Court from 1862 to 1867. He was appointed an honorary chaplain to Queen Victoria in 1867 and Chaplain-in-Ordinary in 1872; then served as Chaplain to the Speaker of the House of Commons from 1874 to 1889.

In 1867, Byng was appointed vicar of the high church St Peter's Church, Cranley Gardens, by Charles James Freake (who had the living of the church). He remained vicar of St Peter's, which became fashionable ("His fine presence, his beautiful voice and his high birth made him a favourite of the couples that were going to get married.") through 1889; and kept up a long correspondence with the former organist of St. Peter's, Sir Arthur Sullivan. In 1889, Byng was elected Grand Chaplain of Freemasonry in England.

=== Resignation from office ===
In 1889 Byng reportedly suddenly resigned all his benefices and left London, supposedly owing to trouble over a gambling debt (he was said to be "addicted to cards").

== Personal life ==
On 8 June 1859, he married Florence Louisa Miles (1840–1862), daughter of Sir William Miles, 1st Baronet; she died in 1862 giving birth to their second son, Edmund. He succeeded to the earldom in May 1899 when his brother, Henry Byng, 4th Earl of Strafford, was decapitated in a railroading accident, a year after inheriting the title from their childless elder brother, George Byng, 3rd Earl of Strafford, the Liberal politician.

On 4 August 1866, he married Emily Georgina Kerr, daughter of Admiral Lord Frederick Herbert Kerr; they had eight children of their own.

He was succeeded on his death by his second son, (the first, Arthur, having died in infancy) Edmund Byng, 6th Earl of Strafford.

Peerage of the United Kingdom
| Preceded by Henry Byng | Earl of Strafford; 1899–1918 | Succeeded by Edmund Byng |
