= Frederick Wentworth, 3rd Earl of Strafford =

Frederick Thomas Wentworth, 3rd Earl of Strafford (1732 – 7 August 1799) was a British peer.

He was the eldest son of William Wentworth, a gentleman usher of the privy chamber to Augusta, Princess of Wales. William was the son of Peter Wentworth of Henbury, the brother of Thomas Wentworth, 1st Earl of Strafford (1672–1739), who was included in the special remainder creating the earldom.

Frederick Thomas was educated at Eton and commissioned an ensign in the 1st Regiment of Foot Guards on 3 December 1760. On 29 January 1773, he was appointed a deputy lieutenant of Cornwall. In 1791, he succeeded his first cousin once removed, William Wentworth, 2nd Earl of Strafford (the last heir-male of the 1st Earl), as Earl of Strafford. He was appointed a deputy lieutenant of the West Riding of Yorkshire on 2 March 1793.

Upon his death in 1799, his estates passed to his sister, Augusta Anne Hatfield-Kaye. On 17 September 1772, Frederick Wentworth married Elizabeth Gould. Elizabeth Wentworth, Countess Strafford died on 1 May 1811.

Peerage of England
Preceded by William Wentworth	Earl of Strafford; 2nd creation 1791–1799	Extinct Re-created in 1847 for John Byng
