= William Wentworth, 2nd Earl of Strafford =

English Earl (1626–1695)

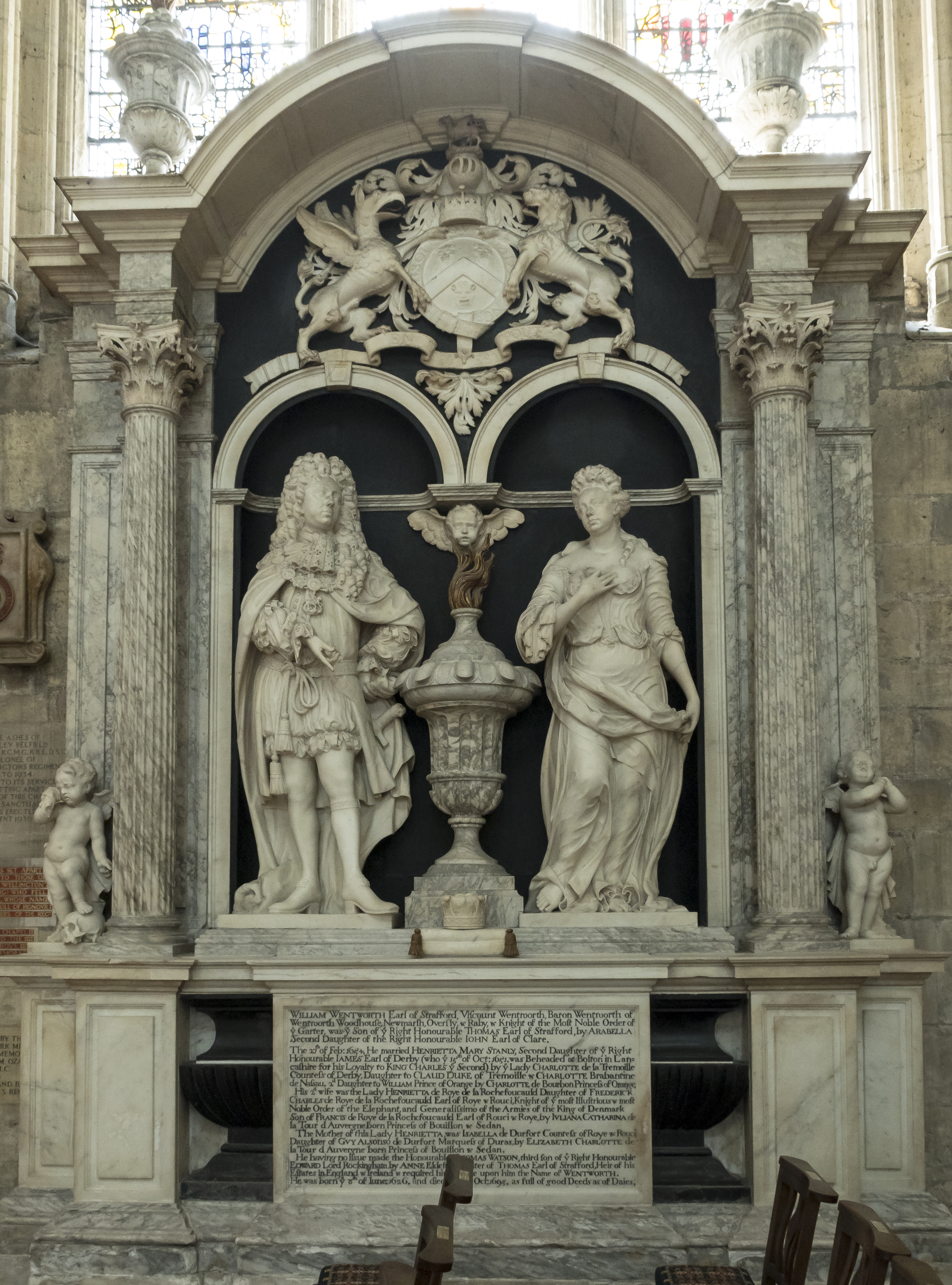
Memorial to William Wentworth, 2nd Earl of Strafford and one of his two wives. York Minster

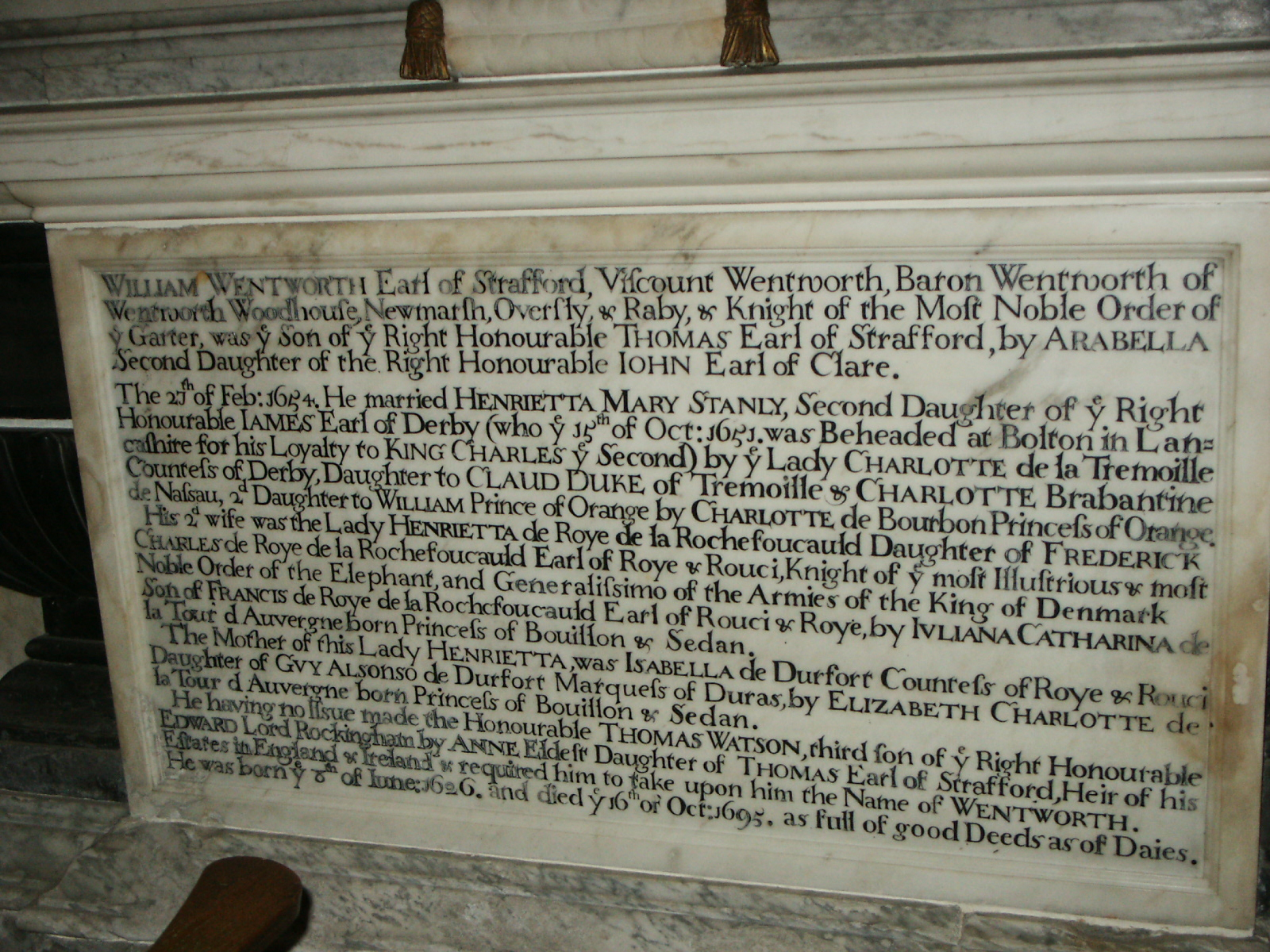
Inscription on the above monument to William Wentworth, 2nd Earl of Strafford, describing his ancestry and succession

William Wentworth, 2nd Earl of Strafford (8 June 1626 – 16 October 1695), KG, of Wentworth Woodhouse in Yorkshire, was a prominent landowner.

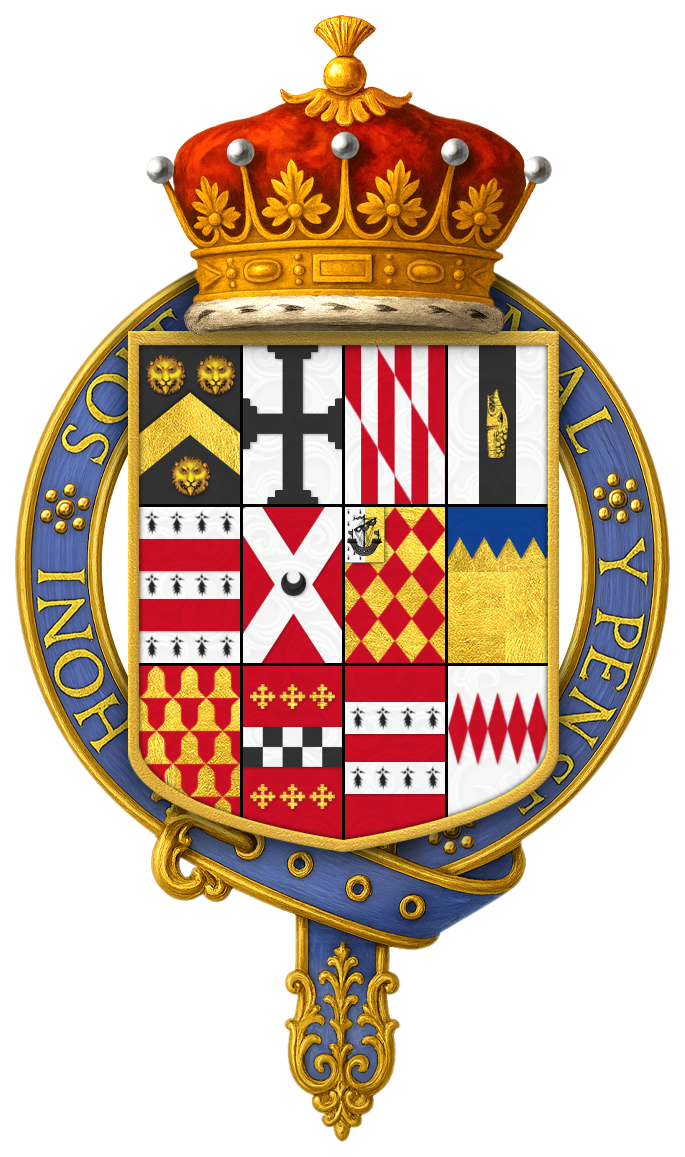
Quartered arms of William Wentworth, 2nd Earl of Strafford, KG

== Origins ==
He was born at Wentworth Woodhouse, the only surviving son of Thomas Wentworth, 1st Earl of Strafford (d.1641) by his second wife Arabella Holles, a daughter of John Holles, 1st Earl of Clare. His mother died in childbirth when he was five years old, after which his father remarried to Elizabeth Rhodes, who was a kindly stepmother to William and his sisters.

== Career ==
He studied at Trinity College Dublin. When his father was executed for treason in 1641, William left England for several years, mainly for fear of reprisals (although most of his father's enemies bore no ill-will to his widow or children), and lived for a while in France. He is said to have acted as a Royalist agent in Germany and Denmark, in partnership with Henry Coventry, which ended in a bitter quarrel, and a duel.

Strafford Attainder Act 1662
- Act of Parliament
- Parliament of England
- Long title: An Act for the reversing the Earle of Strafford his Attainder.
- Citation: 14 Cha. 2. c. 29 (Note: This is the citation in The Statutes of the Realm.); 13 & 14 Cha. 2. c. 29 (Note: This is the citation in The Statutes at Large.); 13 & 14 Cha. 2. c. 5 Pr.
- Territorial extent: England and Wales

Dates
- Royal assent: 19 May 1662
- Commencement: 7 January 1662 (Note: Start of session.)
- Repealed: 30 July 1948
Other legislation
Repeals/revokes	Earl of Strafford's Attainder Act 1640
Repealed by	Statute Law Revision Act 1948

Status: Repealed

Text of statute as originally enacted

In 1652 he was allowed to return to England on taking an oath of abjuration. In 1662 the bill of attainder against his father was reversed by Parliament, and he regained the title of Earl of Strafford and was invested as a Knight of the Garter in 1661. He was elected a Fellow of the Royal Society in 1668 but was expelled in 1685.

He led a rather "obscure, undistinguished and uninteresting life", however his 1667 speech in the House of Lords was praiseworthy, protesting against the banishment of Edward Hyde, 1st Earl of Clarendon, on the grounds that no crime had been proved against him; his attitude is the more creditable since Clarendon had been one of his father's bitterest enemies. He became a member of the Privy Council in 1674, and attended the crucial meeting in 1678 when Titus Oates first revealed his fabricated Popish Plot. During the Exclusion Crisis he supported the future King James II, and made a point of calling on him when James travelled through Yorkshire on his way to Scotland in 1679.

He may be summed up as "rather indolent and lacking in character", but was much loved by his family, especially by his father, whose last letter was to "dearest Will" from "a father that tenderly loves you".

== Marriages ==
He married twice:

- Firstly on 27 February 1654 to Lady Henrietta Mary Stanley, a daughter of James Stanley, 7th Earl of Derby by his wife Charlotte de La Trémoille (d. 1685), a daughter of Claude de La Trémoille, 2nd Duke of Thouars, by his wife Countess Charlotte Brabantina of Nassau, 2nd daughter of William I, Prince of Orange (1533–1584), great-grandfather of King William III of England. The marriage was childless and Henrietta predeceased him. There were riots associated with her funeral. She was buried in York Minster, where he erected an impressive monument to her memory, which still stands.
- Secondly, he married Henrietta de la Rochefoucauld, a daughter of Frederic Charles de Roye de la Rochefoucauld, Count de Roye. The Dowager Countess was buried at St James, Westminster, London, on 14 November 1732.

== Death and legacy ==
He died in Yorkshire on 16 October 1695, aged 69, and was buried in York Minster.

Strafford County, New Hampshire in the United States is named in his honour.

== Succession ==
Having no children nor surviving brothers, the earldom became extinct, but his title of Baron Raby was inherited by his first cousin once-removed Thomas Wentworth, 1st Earl of Strafford (1672–1739), the grandson of a younger brother of the 1st Earl, who became Earl of Strafford in a new creation. His vast estates, however, including Wentworth Woodhouse, passed to his younger nephew Thomas Watson, the third son of his sister Anne Wentworth, who in accordance with the bequest adopted the additional surname of Wentworth.

== Notes ==
Peerage of England
Vacant Attainted Title last held by Thomas Wentworth	Earl of Strafford; 1st creation 1662–1695	Extinct Re-created in 1711 for his kinsman Thomas Wentworth
Preceded by Thomas Wentworth	Baron Raby; 1st creation 1662–1695	Succeeded by Thomas Wentworth
