= Pipton =

Coordinates: 52.034°N 3.217°W

- Location within Powys
- Principal area: Powys
- Preserved county: Powys
- Country: Wales
- Sovereign state: United Kingdom
- Post town: BRECON
- Postcode district: LD3
- Dialling code: 01497
- Police: Dyfed-Powys
- Fire: Mid and West Wales
- Ambulance: Welsh
- UK Parliament: Brecon, Radnor and Cwm Tawe
- Senedd Cymru – Welsh Parliament: Brecon & Radnorshire

Pipton is a small settlement and part of the former community of Bronllys in Powys, Mid Wales. It is in the ecclesiastical parish of Glasbury, St Peters. Pipton was formerly a civil parish (or community) in the historic county of Brecknockshire. It is located on the Afon Llynfi near its confluence with the River Wye. The nearest town is Hay-on-Wye some 5 miles (8.0 km) to the east.

== The settlement ==
The existence of a prehistoric settlement of the area is evidenced by Pipton Long Cairn, a Neolithic burial chamber to the south-west of Pipton Farm. A fragment of a Roman road was discovered during excavations for the South Wales Gas Pipeline south of the disused railway line, about 450 m west of Pipton Farm. The road was not on the orientation of the Y Gaer to Kenchester Roman road which is assumed to have passed near Pipton roughly on the line of the A438. It might have been a spur to this road crossing the Wye and making for Castell Collen.

=== Pipton Castle ===
The historic settlement appears to date from the Norman invasion of Wales, when Pipton formed part of the lands of Walter de Clifford. Most villages in the area were fortified and a mound north of the Afon Llynfi has been interpreted as the motte of Pipton Castle. In 1265 the Treaty of Pipton was signed here between Llywelyn ap Gruffudd, Prince of Wales, and Simon de Montfort, 6th Earl of Leicester, on behalf of his royal captive, King Henry III. As part of the treaty, Henry recognized Llywelyn's lands and title, whilst Llywelyn recognized Henry as his liege lord. Llywelyn had mustered an army at Pipton, which he subsequently sent into England to help de Montfort at the Battle of Evesham. Gruffydd ap Gwenwynwyn, Prince of Powys Wenwynwyn, was one of several other Welsh leaders who were present and attested the treaty.

== Manor of Pipton ==
In the sixteenth century, the manor of Pipton belonged to Walter Devereux, 1st Viscount Hereford and thereafter to his grandson Walter Devereux, 1st Earl of Essex. In the seventeenth and eighteenth centuries it belonged to the Williams family of Old Gwernyfed in nearby Aberllynfi and in the nineteenth century to Thomas Wood of Gwernyfed Park. Pipton previously had its own chapel of ease, long demolished, which was near Pipton Bridge.

== Industry ==
Minchinton (1961) documented that in the early eighteenth century Pipton had a forge on the Afon Llynfi, one of only three forges in the county.

Welsh historian John Lloyd (1906) documented that in 1720, Benjamin Tanner, a Brecon ironmaster, and Richard Wellington, the owner of Hay Castle, founded a furnace and a forge one mile north of Brecon on a bank of the River Honddu and a forge at Pipton.

Lloyd (1906) initially observed that 'both works were so placed – the Furnace on the Honddu and the Forge (Pipton) on the Llynfi stream – in order to utilise the water-power in driving the large bellows necessary to produce a strong blast of air, without the aid of which a sufficiently intense heat could not be produced to melt the iron ore, or pig-iron, as the case may be.' He then observed: 'the Llynfi, which issues from Llangorse lake, has a trifle less – though more equal – volume of water through the year' than the Honddu. He opined that the Pipton forge 'was fed by a supply of pig-iron from the Honddu furnace'. Minchinton (1961) documented: 'In 1736 this forge, sometimes known as Tanner's forge, had an output of 50-100 tons per annum'.

In 1753 the ownership of the forge changed hands. Lloyd (1906) and Redmonds, King and Hey (2011) documented that in that year Thomas Maybery acquired the Pipton forge and immediately conveyed it to his son, John. Minchinton (1961) observed that in 1759 the forge produced 150 tons. He concluded: 'Even less well-placed for expansion than the furnace with which it was associated, the Pipton forge survived a little longer, getting its pig iron from Hirwaun when the Brecon furnace closed. It also ceased production at an unknown date in the later eighteenth century.'

== The parish and community ==
In 1831, Pipton was described as a hamlet with a population of 125. This presumably refers to the civil parish, however, since the settlement of Pipton itself now consists of little more than a bridge, a farm, and a single house and, based on archaeological evidence, may never have been much larger.

Pipton was a civil parish between 1837 and 1974, when it was retermed a community. The parish included the settlement of Pipton and extended northwards towards Llyswen, where it included the house and lands of Y Dderw, and westwards towards Bronllys, where it included the farms of Pentre-Sollars and Porth-y-morddwr. The population of the parish declined from 105 in 1881 to 48 in 1971. In 1985, the community of Pipton was merged with the community of Bronllys.

=== Y Dderw ===
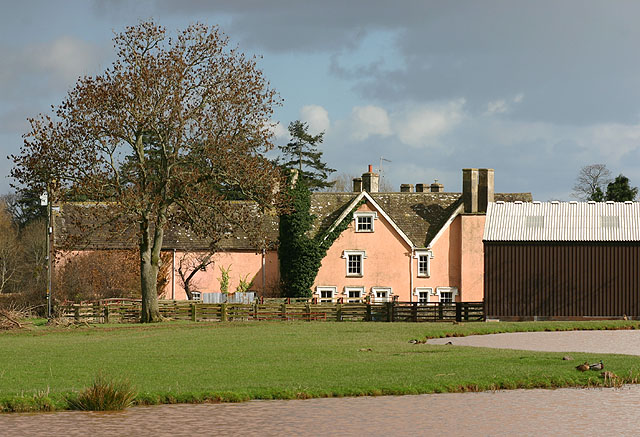
Y Dderw

Y Dderw, within the former community, is a large 16th-century house. It was owned by the Morgan family in the 17th and 18th century. William Morgan of Y Dderw was the King's Attorney for South Wales (1639–49) and MP for Brecknock (1640–49). Charles Morgan was MP for the borough of Brecon (1763–69) and for Brecknock (1769–87). John Morgan was MP for the borough of Brecon (1769–71). It is now a grade II* listed building.

== Notable people ==
Sir Walter Vaughan Morgan, sometime Lord Mayor of London, was born in Pipton in 1831. His brother, Octavius Vaughan Morgan, Liberal member of parliament for Battersea 1888–1892, was born there in 1837.
