= Old Gwernyfed =

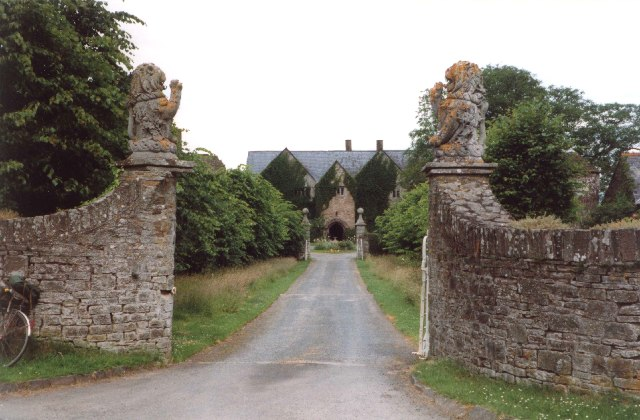
- View of Old Gwernyfed through its gate piers

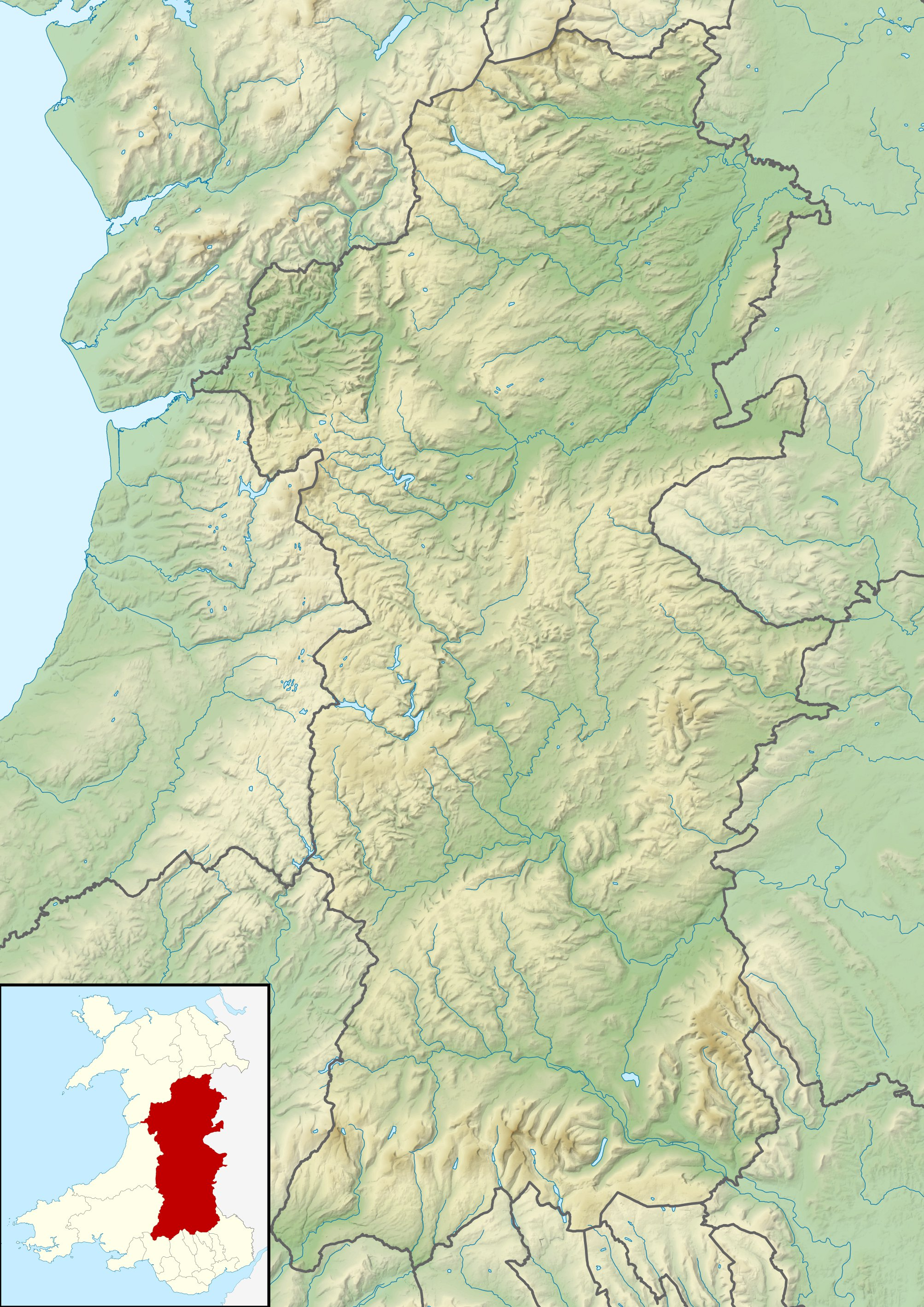
- Location within Powys
- 52.0214°N 3.1928°W
- Type: House
- Location: Gwernyfed, Powys, Wales

History
- Built: Medieval

Site notes
- Architectural style: Vernacular
- Governing body: Privately owned

Listed Building – Grade I
- Official name: Old Gwernyfed
- Designated: 28 February 1952
- Reference no.: 6654

Listed Building – Grade II*
- Official name: Gatepiers to inner court in front of Old Gwernyfed with garden walls on each side
- Designated: 28 September 1961
- Reference no.: 17052

Listed Building – Grade II*
- Official name: North tower in inner front garden, with the garden boundary wall leading to the north-east wing of the house
- Designated: 28 September 1961
- Reference no.: 6646

Listed Building – Grade II*
- Official name: South tower in the inner front garden with garden wall running to south-west ring of the house
- Designated: 28 September 1961
- Reference no.: 17051

Cadw/ICOMOS Register of Parks and Gardens of Special Historic Interest in Wales
- Official name: Old Gwernyfed & Gwernyfed Park
- Designated: 1 February 2022
- Reference no.: PGW(Po)5(POW)
- Listing: Grade II*

Old Gwernyfed (Welsh: Hen Wernyfed) is a house dating from the medieval period in the community of Gwernyfed, Powys, Wales, close to the village of Felindre. It remains a private home and is a Grade I listed building. The gardens are listed on the Cadw/ICOMOS Register of Parks and Gardens of Special Historic Interest in Wales.

== History ==
The Gwernyfed estate is of ancient origin; it is reputed to have been given by Bernard de Neufmarché (c. 1050 – c. 1125), the earliest of the Norman marcher lords, to Peter Gunter. It came into the ownership of the Williams family at the end of the 16th century. David Williams (d.1613), made his fortune in the law, serving as attorney general for South Wales from 1581-1595, Recorder of Brecon 1581-1604, Serjeant-at-law in 1593 and a judge of the King's Bench in 1604. His earnings funded extensive land purchases including the Gwernyfed estate which he bought from John Gunter in 1600. He also built up a substantial estate centred on Kingston Bagpuize in Oxfordshire where he died in 1613. (Note: David Williams was buried in Brecon Cathedral, under an "elaborate effigy".) Subsequent generations of his family served as members of parliament and as High sheriff. In the 17th century, the original medieval manor house was rebuilt. It contains a screens passage on which Charles I is said to have left a coded message for Prince Rupert of the Rhine when the king stayed at the house after the Battle of Naseby in 1645. (Note: The house's current owners suggest that another inscription was carved on the screens passage by William Shakespeare.) Charles was the guest of Sir Henry Williams (c.1603-c.1656), a staunch royalist on whom the king had bestowed a baronetcy the previous year. A later Williams, Sir Thomas Williams, 1st Baronet, served as doctor to the king's heir, Charles II. A major fire gutted the main wing of the house in the 1680s, and this remains ruinous. In the 1730s, the Williams moved their main residence to Llangoed Hall and the old mansion descended to the level of a farmhouse. The baronetcy, and the male Williams line, ended with the death of Sir Edward Williams, 5th Baronet in 1804. (Note: This was the second occurrence of the failure of the male line. Sir Henry Williams, 2nd Baronet (c. 1635 – February 1666) died without a male heir. His daughter Elizabeth married Edward Williams (1659–1721).) The estate passed to his daughter, Mary, and on her marriage to Thomas Wood passed into their possession. In the 1870s, the family returned to the Gwernyfed estate, commissioning William Eden Nesfield to build a new house, Gwernyfed Park, about 1 km north-west of the ancient manor, as a wedding present for Captain Thomas Wood. Since the 1950s, Gwernyfed Park has been the main building of Gwernyfed High School. After a period as a hotel, Old Gwernyfed returned to a private residence and has been undergoing restoration in the 21st century.

== Architecture and description ==
Old Gwernyfed conforms to a E- plan, reputedly in honour of Elizabeth I. The original building was likely a long house form, to which the additional wings were added in the 17th-century rebuilding. It is constructed of sandstone rubble under a slate roof. The central porch block, and the two wings are gabled, with the wings having large chimney stacks. The interior retains much of the original medieval hall plan, with a screens passage bisecting the house.

Many of the buildings on the estate have listed building status. The house is listed at Grade I. Three sets of gates framing entrances to the house are listed, two at Grade II* and one at Grade II. A range of former agricultural buildings also has a Grade II listing. Towers to the north and south of the main entrance gate are listed at Grade II*.

The quite separate building of Gwernyfed Park (now Gwernyfed High School) has a Grade II* listing, while its stable block is listed Grade II. The kitchen garden, the gardener's cottage, the greenhouses, a set of garden gates, and the lodge gates and walls, all have Grade II listings. The gardens are also listed, at Grade II*, on the Cadw/ICOMOS Register of Parks and Gardens of Special Historic Interest in Wales, and the Elizabethan earthworks are a scheduled monument.

== Sources ==
- Scourfield, Robert; Haslam, Richard (2013). Powys: Montgomeryshire, Radnorshire and Breconshire. The Buildings of Wales. New Haven, US and London: Yale University Press. ISBN 978-0-300-18508-9.
