= Thomas Wood (British Army officer) =

General The Right Honourable Thomas Wood FRS

Member of Parliament for Middlesex
- In office 1837–1747 Serving with George Byng, Lord Robert Grosvenor
- Preceded by: Joseph Hume; George Byng
- Succeeded by: Ralph Bernal Osborne; Lord Robert Grosvenor

Personal details
- Born: 1804
- Died: 23 October 1872 (aged 67–68)
- Party: Conservative
- Spouse: Frances Smyth (m. 1848)
- Parent: Thomas Wood
- Education: Harrow School

Military service
- Branch/service: Grenadier Guards
- Rank: General
- Battles/wars: Crimean War

General Thomas Wood FRS (1804 – 23 October 1872) was a British Army officer and a Conservative politician who sat in the House of Commons from 1837 to 1847.

== Early life ==
Wood was born the son of Thomas Wood MP for Breconshire and Lady Caroline Stewart. His younger brother, Sir Charles Alexander Wood, married Sophia Ann Brownrigg (a daughter of John Studholme Brownrigg, a prominent merchant and MP for Boston).

His paternal grandparents were Thomas Wood (eldest son of Thomas Wood, MP for Middlesex) and Mary Williams (daughter and heiress of Sir Edward Williams, 5th Baronet). His maternal grandparents were Robert Stewart, 1st Marquess of Londonderry and Frances Stewart, Marchioness of Londonderry (daughter of the Whig politician Charles Pratt, 1st Earl Camden).

He was educated at Harrow School. He lived at Littleton, Middlesex, and at Gwernyfed Park, Breconshire, Wales.

== Career ==
He became an officer in the Grenadier Guards. He commanded the 3rd Battalion Grenadier Guards in the early stages of the Crimean War (1853–56) and reached the rank of General.

In 1837 he was elected Member of Parliament for Middlesex. He held the seat until 1847. Also in 1841 he was elected a Fellow of the Royal Society.

== Personal life ==
On 6 July 1848, Wood married Frances Smyth (d. 1892), daughter of John Henry Smyth and Lady Elizabeth Anne FitzRoy (a daughter George FitzRoy, 4th Duke of Grafton). Together, they were the parents of:

- Caroline Elizabeth Wood (b. 1850)
- Mary Isabella Wood (b. 1852)
- Thomas Wood (1853–1933), a Col. in the Grenadier Guards who married Hon. Rhona Cecily Emily Tollemache, daughter of John Tollemache, 1st Baron Tollemache, in 1883.
- Laura Lavinia Wood (1854–1938), who married Sir Henry Charles John Bunbury, 10th Baronet, son of Col. Henry William St Pierre Bunbury, in 1884.
- William Henry Wood (1857–1923), a Reverend.
- Ruth Francis Wood (b. 1859), who married Edward Cyril Newcome.
- Charles John Wood (1862–1902), who married Mary Ashton Oxenden, a daughter of Rev. Ashton Oxenden, in 1891.

He died on 23 October 1872, aged 68. His widow died on 7 December 1892.

Parliament of the United Kingdom
Preceded by Joseph Hume; George Byng	Member of Parliament for Middlesex; 1837 – 1847; With: George Byng to Feb 1847; Lord Robert Grosvenor from Feb 1847	Succeeded by Ralph Bernal Osborne; Lord Robert Grosvenor
