= Sir Edward Williams, 5th Baronet =

Welsh landowner

Sir Edward Williams, 5th Baronet (1728 – 12 July 1804) was a Welsh landowner.

== Early life ==
Williams was born in 1728 in Gwernyfed, Brecknockshire, Wales. He was the second surviving son of David Williams (1684–1739) and Susannah Witherstone (b. 1693). His elder brother was Sir Henry Williams, 4th Baronet.

His paternal grandfather was Sir David Williams, 3rd Baronet (a son of Sir Edward Williams of Gwernyfed, MP for Breconshire, and grandson of Sir Thomas Williams, 1st Baronet).

== Career ==
In 1740, his grandfather died and his elder brother Henry inherited the baronetcy but Henry died the following year and Edward became the 5th Baronet. The Williams baronetcy, of Elham in the County of Kent, had been created in the Baronetage of England on 12 November 1674 for Thomas Williams, Physician to Charles I and James II. His son, Sir John Williams, 2nd Baronet was High Sheriff of Kent and represented Herefordshire in Parliament. As Sir John had no sons, his nephew, Edward's grandfather, inherited the baronetcy but the Elham estate passed to the 2nd Baronet's daughter and her husband, Thomas Symonds.

Sir Edward was one of the principal promoters of the Brecknockshire Agricultural Society in 1755.

He was appointed Colonel of the Brecknockshire Militia on 29 January 1760, during the Seven Years' War.

== Personal life ==
Williams married Mary Ellis le Heup (1728–1768), a daughter of and Elizabeth (née Lombard) le Heup (daughter of Peter Lombard of Burnham Thorpe) and Isaac le Heup, MP who was a brother-in-law of Horatio Walpole, 1st Baron Walpole. Mary's sister, Elizabeth le Heup married John Lloyd. Together, they had one son who predeceased him and a daughter:

- Edward Williams (d. c. 1799), who died unmarried.
- Mary Williams (1752–1820), who in 1776 married Thomas Wood, son of Thomas Wood, MP for Middlesex.

After his first wife's death in 1768, he married Mary Riley. Sir Edward died in Clifton, Gloucestershire. in 1804. On his death, the title became either dormant or extinct; and Gwernyfed was inherited by his daughter, Mary.

=== Descendants ===
Through his daughter Mary, he was a grandfather of Thomas Wood (1777–1860), MP for Breconshire from 1806 to 1847, who married Lady Caroline Stewart (daughter of Robert Stewart, 1st Marquess of Londonderry and Frances Stewart, Marchioness of Londonderry).

Baronetage of England
Preceded by Henry Williams	Baronet (of Elham); 1741–1804	Extinct
