= Three Cocks =

Coordinates: 52.04278°N 3.20149°W

Three Cocks: Welsh: Aberllynfi
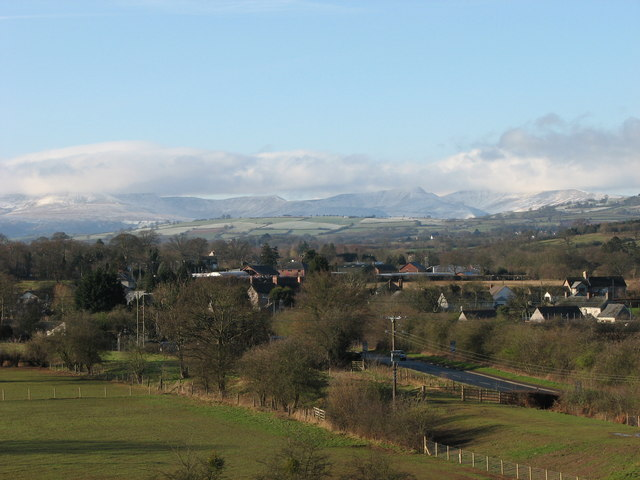

- Location within Powys
- Population: n/a
- OS grid reference: SO174378
- Principal area: Powys
- Preserved county: Powys
- Country: Wales
- Sovereign state: United Kingdom
- Post town: BRECON
- Postcode district: LD3
- Dialling code: 01497
- Police: Dyfed-Powys
- Fire: Mid and West Wales
- Ambulance: Welsh
- UK Parliament: Brecon, Radnor and Cwm Tawe
- Senedd Cymru – Welsh Parliament: Brecon & Radnorshire

Three Cocks or Aberllynfi (Welsh: [ˌabɛrˈɬənvi]) is a village near Glasbury in Powys, Wales. The Welsh name refers to the mouth of the Afon Llynfi which enters the River Wye a mile from the village. The nearest town is Talgarth some 2.7 miles (4.4 km) to the southwest.

== Three Cocks Coaching Inn ==
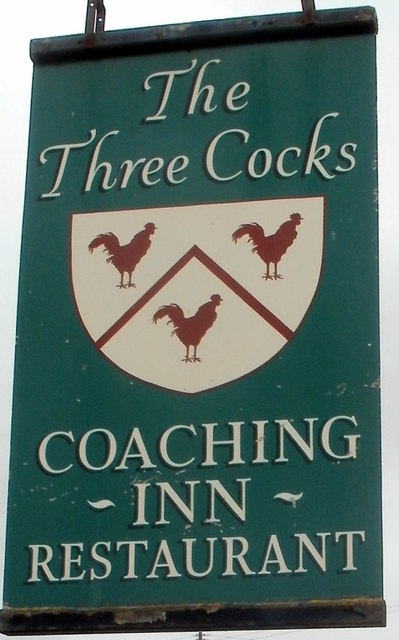
Three Cocks inn sign

The curious English name of the village is comparatively recent and was taken from the former railway station (Three Cocks Junction, now a garden centre) where the Hereford, Hay and Brecon Railway met the Mid-Wales Railway. The station derived its name from the 15th century Three Cocks Inn (a coaching inn, still extant) which in turn took its name from the armorial bearings of former local landowners, the Williams family of Old Gwernyfed. These were supposed to have been based on the arms of the medieval Welsh prince Einon Sais, who lived in Aberllynfi, but this is probably a later invention. The station, together with all the services which ran through it, was closed in December 1962.

Thomas Edwards, a former innkeeper of the Three Cocks, was also a bridge-builder, constructing the 7-arch Glasbury Bridge in 1777 (destroyed by floods in 1795) and rebuilding the 3-arch bridge over the Llynfi at Pont Ithel in 1783.

== Gwernyfed ==
The original house and deer park of Old Gwernyfed (Welsh: [ɡwɛrˈnəvɛd]), to the south of the village, is of medieval origin, but the house was extensively rebuilt in the 17th century. In 1600 it was purchased by Sir David Williams, MP for the Borough of Brecon (1584–93, 1597–1604). In 1613, it was inherited by his son, Sir Henry Williams, MP for the Borough of Brecon (1601–04) and for Breconshire (1620–28). His son, also Sir Henry Williams, was also MP for Breconshire (1628–29). On 6 August 1645, he was said to have entertained King Charles I at Gwernyfed, following Charles' defeat at the Battle of Naseby. Sir Edward Williams was not a relation (despite his surname), but married the family heiress in 1675. This seems to have ensured that he too became MP for Breconshire (1697–98, 1705–21). In 1776, Thomas Wood also married the family heiress. Their son, Thomas Wood, was MP for Breconshire for forty-one years (1806–47). He enjoyed the friendship of members of the royal family and King George IV visited him at Old Gwernyfed. The house is now a grade I listed building. The gardens and park are listed at Grade II* on the Cadw/ICOMOS Register of Parks and Gardens of Special Historic Interest in Wales.

Gwernyfed Park, a much later Jacobean-style house within the deer park, was built for Captain Thomas Wood by William Eden Nesfield in the 1870s. During the Second World War, it was requisitioned and used by the South Wales Borderers. Since 1950, it has formed part of Gwernyfed High School. A rugby union club, Gwernyfed RFC, was founded at the school in the 1960s, but now plays at and represents the nearby town of Talgarth. Gwernyfed Park is now a grade II* listed building.

== Aberllynfi parish and community ==
Aberllynfi was once a separate ecclesiastical parish, but its church fell into disuse in the 18th century.

Following local government reorganization in 1985, the former Community of Aberllynfi has been placed in the Community of Gwernyfed, together with the neighbouring village of Felindre and the southern part of the village of Glasbury.

In August 2025, the British Cycling website censored the name of the village.

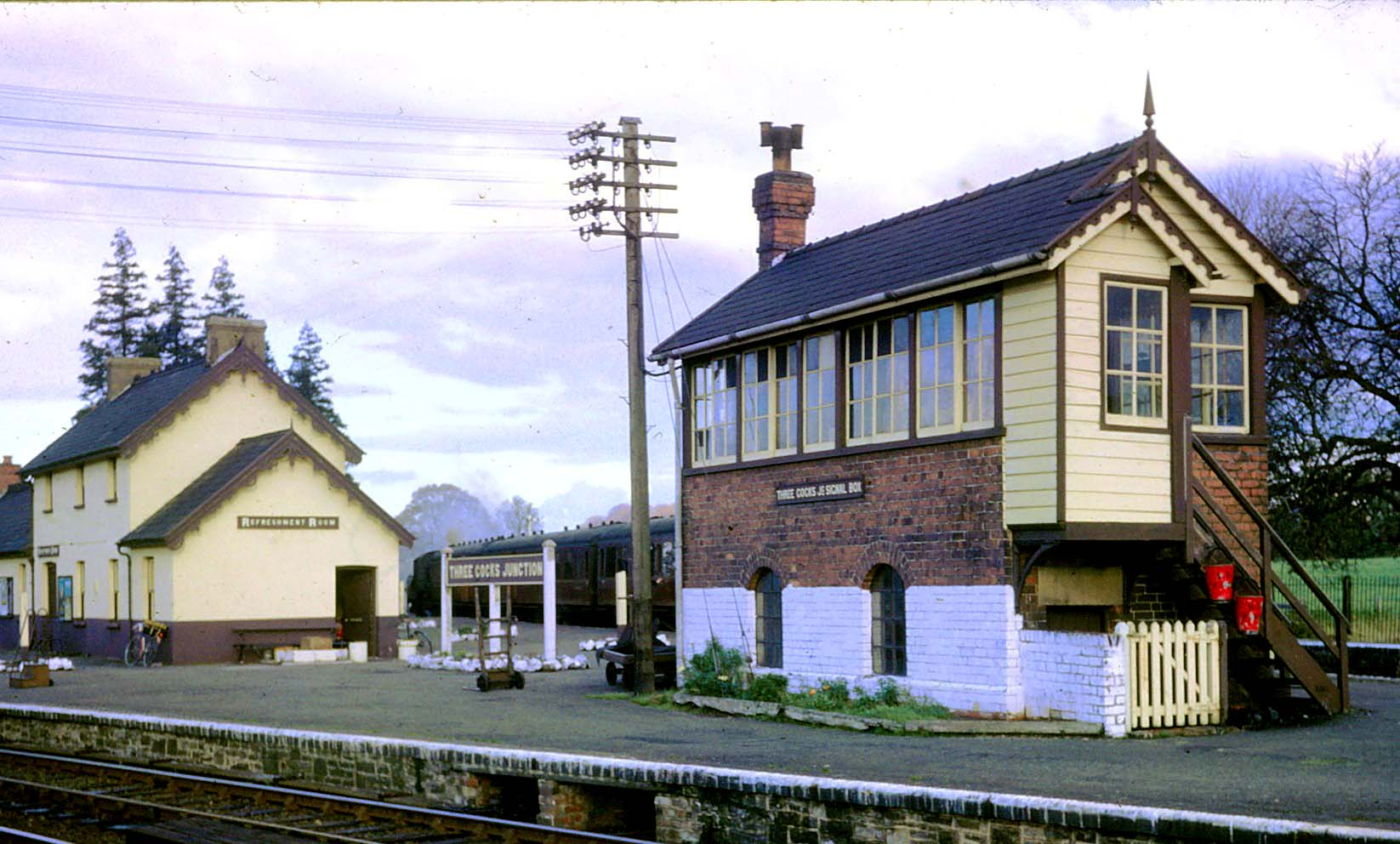
Three Cocks Junction with signalbox and Refreshment Room c1960

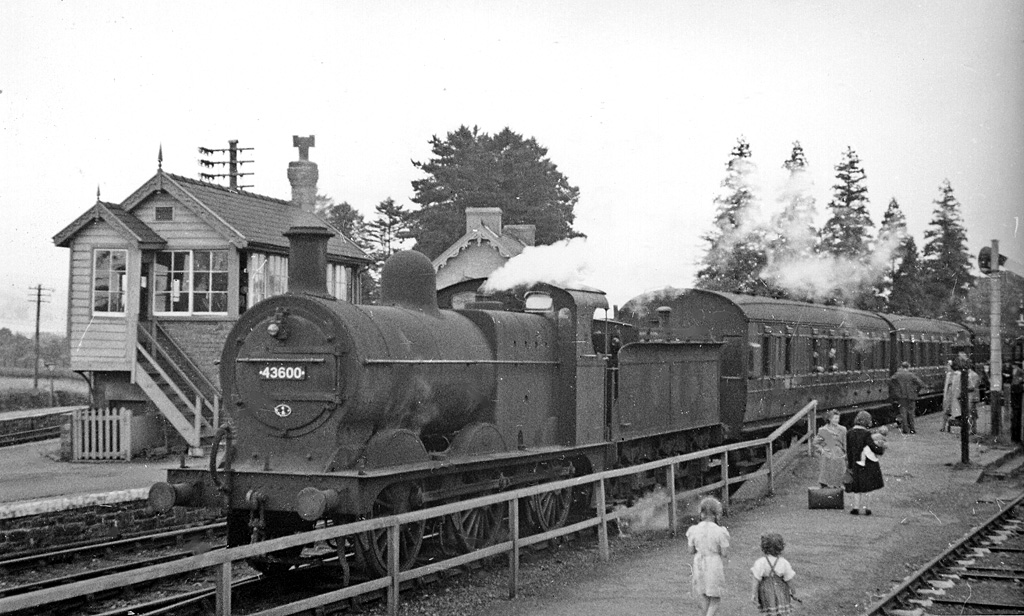
Three Cocks Junction Station in 1949

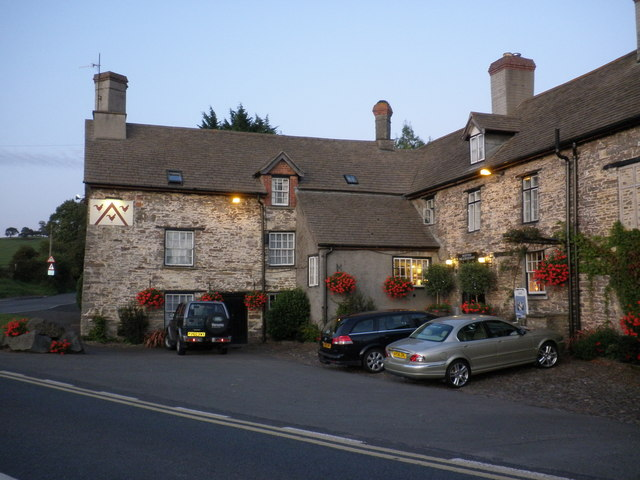
The Three Cocks Inn

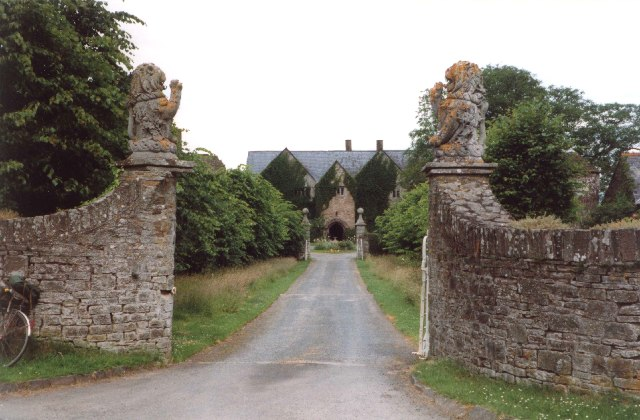
Old Gwernyfed
