= Thomas Wood (1708–1799) =

British Whig politician (1708–1799)

Thomas Wood FRS

Member of Parliament for Middlesex
- In office 1779–1780 Serving with John Wilkes
- Preceded by: John Glynn; John Wilkes
- Succeeded by: John Wilkes; George Byng

Personal details
- Born: 25 September 1708
- Died: 25 June 1799 (aged 90)
- Party: Whig
- Spouse: Elizabeth Jones (after 1743)
- Relations: Thomas Wood (grandson)
- Children: 5
- Education: Eton College
- Alma mater: Christ Church, Oxford; All Souls College, Oxford

Thomas Wood FRS (25 September 1708 – 25 June 1799), was a British politician who briefly sat in the House of Commons from 1779 to 1780.

== Early life ==
Wood was born on 25 September 1708. The seventh son of Edward Wood and Elizabeth (née Bridger) Wood (daughter and heiress of Henry Bridger of Bramley, Surrey), he was from Littleton (then in Middlesex, now Surrey).

He was educated at Eton College from 1718 to 1725 before matriculating at Christ Church, Oxford in 1725 and All Souls College, Oxford in 1732.

== Career ==
A barrister, he was called in 1735, made a bencher in 1766, and later served as Treasurer of the Inner Temple where he had been admitted in 1729. In 1748, he succeeded to his brothers estates. A member of the Whig party, he was Member of Parliament for Middlesex from 1779 to 1780.

He was elected a Fellow of the Royal Society in February 1761.

== Personal life ==
On 2 October 1743 Wood was married to Anne Jones, daughter of Richard Jones. Together, they were the parents of two sons and three daughters, including:

- Thomas Wood, who married Mary Williams (1752–1820), daughter and heiress of Sir Edward Williams, 5th Baronet, of Gwernyfed.

Wood died on 25 June 1799.

=== Descendants ===
Through his son Thomas, he was a grandfather of Thomas Wood (1777–1860), MP for Breconshire from 1806 to 1847; he married Lady Caroline Stewart, daughter of Robert Stewart, 1st Marquess of Londonderry and Frances Stewart, Marchioness of Londonderry (daughter of the Whig politician Charles Pratt, 1st Earl Camden).

Parliament of Great Britain
| Preceded by John Glynn; John Wilkes | Member of Parliament for Middlesex; 1779–1780; With: John Wilkes | Succeeded by John Wilkes; George Byng |
