= St Peter's Church, Glasbury =

Church in Powys, Wales

Coordinates: 52.0391°N 3.2010°W

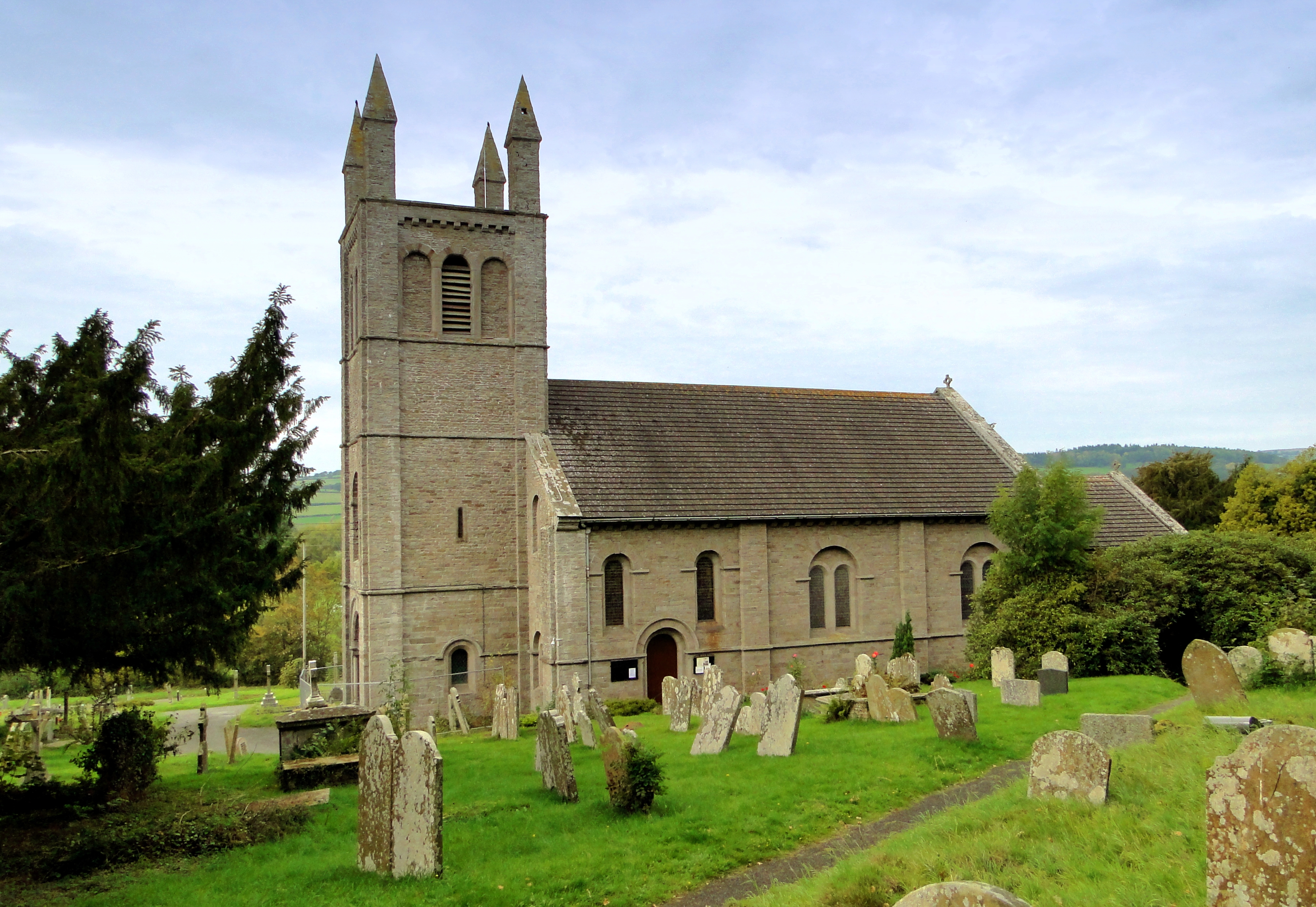
St Peter's Church

The Church of St Peter (and St Cynidr) is located outside the Welsh village of Glasbury and dates back to the sixth century. Near the confluence of the rivers Wye and Llynfi, the church has experienced serious flooding which has required it to be rebuilt twice, in 1665 and 1838. The current church is designated a Grade II listed building and is open to the public for worship.

== History ==
=== Original church (6th–17th centuries) ===
The religious cell and subsequent church was founded in Glasbury by Saint Cynidr in the 6th century; he is believed to be buried on the site. In the 12th century the church was reinforced with stone materials, and this is likely to be when it was rededicated to Saint Peter. The church has historical ties with England as it was dedicated to the monks of Gloucester in 1088 and supplied its tithe income to St Peter's Abbey. St Peter's Church underwent some administrative changes in the 16th and 17th centuries, with the Dissolution of the Monasteries in 1540 being followed by the wider political changes of the Commonwealth period (1649–1660) and Restoration (1660), which resulted in a tumultuous turnover of clergy.

=== Destruction and reconstruction (17th–19th centuries) ===
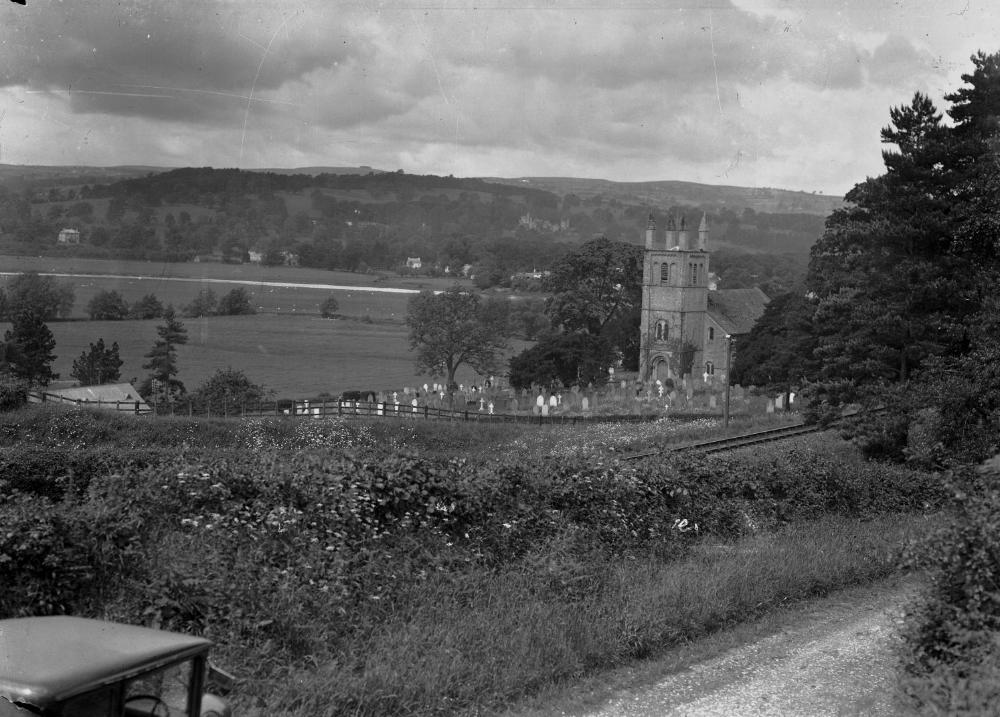
St Peter's Church in about 1910

The original church was located on low-lying land and was damaged by severe floods in the 17th century which altered the course of the River Wye. In 1663 construction of a replacement church began on higher ground to the south-west of the original structure; this was completed in 1665. This land was acquired from Sir Henry Williams of Gwernyfed. Thomas Stock was the vicar of the Church from 1778 to 1804. In the 1820s the church was deemed insufficient due to its limited capacity and poor state; therefore, a decision was made to rebuild it once again.

=== Second rebuilding (19th century – present) ===
A new church was built in 1836–1838 and is the present-day St Peter's Church, which remains an active place of worship. This new building cost £3,000 and was designed by the London architect Lewis Vulliamy in the Norman Revival style of architecture. Further renovations were made in the next century, with the addition of a chancel and organ chamber added in 1881 and 1910 respectively. In addition to its traditional interior, St Peter's contains a stained glass window designed by Sir Ninian Comper and memorials to local people who died in the First World War, including three of the church's bell ringers. The exterior is marked by a dry-stone wall which encloses the 1.4-hectare (3.5-acre) churchyard. St Peter's Church was listed at Grade II in 1995, with a couple of other notable Grade II listed monuments on its premises, including the Hughes Monument and an 18th-century sundial.
