= Felindre, Gwernyfed =

Village in Powys, Wales

Coordinates: 52.022°N 3.190°W

Felindre
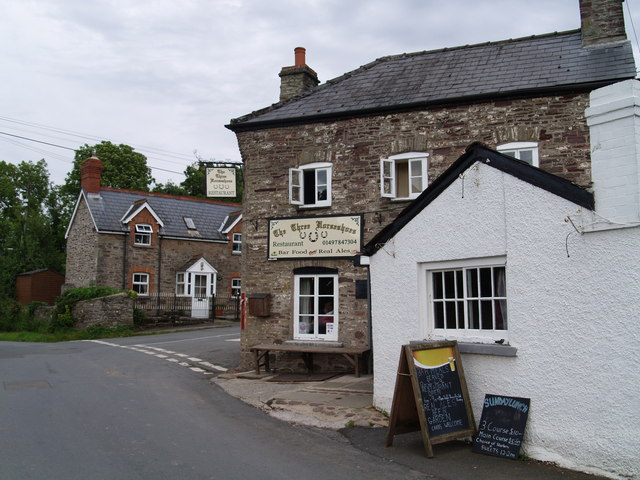
- The Three Horseshoes pub in Felindre

- Location within Powys
- OS grid reference: SO1836
- Community: Felindre
- Principal area: Powys
- Preserved county: Powys
- Country: Wales
- Sovereign state: United Kingdom
- Post town: BRECON
- Postcode district: LD3
- Police: Dyfed-Powys
- Fire: Mid and West Wales
- Ambulance: Welsh
- UK Parliament: Brecon, Radnor and Cwm Tawe
- Senedd Cymru – Welsh Parliament: Brecon and Radnorshire

Felindre (also known as Velindre) is a village in southern Powys. The village is a part of the Gwernyfed community which also includes Three Cocks and Glasbury, and is in the UK parliamentary constituency of Brecon, Radnor and Cwm Tawe.

== Location ==
Felindre is in southern Powys. Three Cocks is a mile north-west of the village, with Talgarth 2.5 miles to the south-west and Hay-on-Wye 4.5 miles to the north-east. The village lies next to Felindre Brook.

Felindre is the nearest village to Old Gwernyfed, a mansion house rebuilt in the 17th century which is a Grade I listed building.

== History ==
The name 'Felindre' comes from the words 'melin tref', meaning 'mill farm'. By the 17th century, Felindre was a part of the parish of Tregoyd and Felindre, which the Gwernyfed estate extended into. Water from Felindre Brook was used to fill fishponds in Old Gwernyfed manor. The chapel of ease for Felindre, a chapel for the parish church in Glasbury, closed in the 1690s, and it is believed that the archway from the church was incorporated into the entrance porch of Old Gwernyfed.

In 1862, Thomas II Wood, the owner of Old Gwernyfed, donated a piece of land in Felindre village to be used as a Presbyterian chapel. The chapel held services in both English and Welsh. In the 1870s, John Marius Wilson described Felindre in his Imperial Gazetteer of England and Wales as 'a hamlet in Glasbury parish'. Felindre School, a voluntary controlled school managed by the Church, was opened in 1877; a reservoir, fed by water from Felindre Brook, was later built above the school.

In 1937, a celebration took place in Felindre to mark the coronation of George VI, involving a horse-drawn procession through the village. The Felindre Women's Institute was founded in 1947. Additional council houses were built in the village by E.T.D Lewis, vicar of St Peter's Church, Glasbury between 1946 and 1984, and Felindre village hall was built in 1976. Felindre School was closed by Powys County Council in 1993.

== Amenities ==
Alongside the Village Hall, Felindre contained a pub named The Three Horseshoes which had been present in the village since the 19th century. In 2022, after an offer to allow the community to acquire the building was turned down, the pub was listed for sale.

Felindre was previously home to a horse riding centre known as Cadar Hall. It is the nearest village to Tregoyd Mountain Riders riding centre.
