= Treaty of Pipton =

1265 treaty during the Second Barons' War

The Treaty of Pipton was signed on 22 June 1265 during the Second Barons' War and concluded an alliance between Simon de Montfort and the Prince of Gwynedd Llywelyn ap Gruffudd.

== Background ==
Simon de Montfort defeated the English King Henry III at the Battle of Lewes in 1264, capturing him and his son Prince Edward. However, on 28 May 1265, Prince Edward managed to escape captivity and resume the conflict and soon recaptured Worcester as Simon de Montfort was making his way to London. This left Simon de Montfort outmatched and stuck in the middle of a hostile country, cut off from his allies in the east. Finding himself in this precarious situation, he turned to Llywelyn and offered him better terms than any yet suggested by the English. With the company of Llywelyn's vassals, he and Simon de Montfort signed the treaty of Pipton on either 19 or 22 June (sources disagree). One theory is that Llywelyn and Simon de Montfort signed it on 19 June but it was signed by the captive King Henry III on 22 June.

== Terms ==
The treaty established an alliance between Llywelyn and the rebelling Simon de Montfort. Llywelyn would pay 30,000 marks (£20,000) in ten annual instalments and assist Simon de Montfort militarily. In return, Llywelyn ap Gruffudd would receive recognition of the title of Prince of Wales with the suzerainty of all other Welsh chieftains implied, the restoration of all the lands taken from Dafydd and Llywelyn the Great, the past two Princes of Gwynedd, and the control of Painscastle, Hawarden and Whittington Castle.

== Impacts ==
Just over a month after the treaty was signed, Simon de Montfort was killed in the Battle of Evesham. However, the Treaty of Pipton helped the Kingdom of Gwynedd to assert control over much of Wales and in 1267, the Treaty of Montgomery would be signed, where King Henry III reasserted most terms under the Treaty of Pipton.
