= Glasbury =

Village near Hay-on-Wye, Wales

Glasbury: Welsh: Y Clas-ar-Wy
- Location within Powys
- OS grid reference: SO179393
- Principal area: Powys
- Preserved county: Powys
- Country: Wales
- Sovereign state: United Kingdom
- Post town: HEREFORD
- Postcode district: HR3
- Post town: BRECON
- Postcode district: LD3
- Dialling code: 014974
- Police: Dyfed-Powys
- Fire: Mid and West Wales
- Ambulance: Welsh
- UK Parliament: Brecon, Radnor and Cwm Tawe
- Senedd Cymru – Welsh Parliament: Brecon & Radnorshire
- List of places UK Wales Powys 52.045°N 3.202°W Community map: Map of the community

Glasbury (Welsh: Y Clas-ar-Wy), also known as Glasbury-on-Wye, is a village and community in Powys, Wales. The village lies at an important crossing point on the River Wye, connecting the historic counties of Brecknockshire and Radnorshire, and is located just outside the Brecon Beacons National Park, north of the Black Mountains. The village is split between the communities of Glasbury and Gwernyfed. The nearest town is Hay-on-Wye, some 4 miles (6 km) to the north east. The nearest city is Hereford in England, some 25 miles (40 km) to the east. Glasbury is a popular location for river fishing, canoeing and kayaking. The population of Glasbury community in Radnorshire was 994 (census 2011), in 1841 it was 838.

== History ==
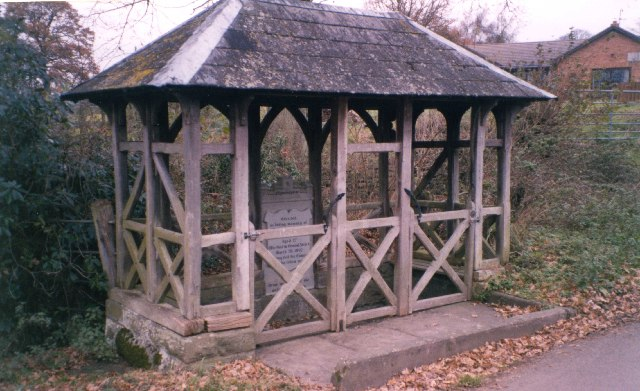
Cynidr's Well, Ffynnon Gynydd

=== Saint Cynidr and early settlement ===
The early village grew north of the river crossing, where a church was built dedicated to St Cynidr, a 6th-century bishop said to be buried in Glasbury. The name 'Glasbury' derives from the Welsh 'clas', which signifies a glebe or church land. St Cynidr's name is retained in the small settlement of Ffynnon Gynydd to the north of the village, where Cynidr's well is still visible. From the 6th century to the 11th century, Glasbury formed part of the Kingdom of Brycheiniog, ruled from nearby Talgarth.

=== Bishops of Glasbury ===
The importance of this early church was such that Glasbury was made a diocese. A list of the bishops of Glasbury still exists and gives the last bishop as Tryferyn, who died in 1055. The diocese was subsumed by the bishopric of Glamorgan, later Llandaff.

=== Battle of Glasbury ===
In the mid 11th century, the Welsh kingdoms (including Brycheiniog) were temporarily united under Gruffydd ap Llywelyn, King of Wales. On 16 June 1056, a battle was fought at Glasbury between an English force, led by Bishop Leofgar of Hereford, and a Welsh force led by Gruffydd ap Llywelyn, at which the warrior bishop was killed.

=== Marcher lordship ===
After the Norman invasion, the kingdom of Brycheiniog (including Glasbury) was conquered or otherwise acquired by Bernard de Neufmarché, one of the Marcher Lords. In 1088, he presented the Manor and church of Glasbury to the Abbey of St Peter's at Gloucester and the parish church of St. Cynidr was rededicated to St Peter. The patronage of the church was later transferred to the Bishop of Gloucester and subsequently to the Bishop of St David's, with whom it remains today.

In 1144, as part of an exchange, the lordship of the Manor of Glasbury passed from Gloucester Abbey to Walter de Clifford, after which time it was frequently contested by the marcher families. Following a dispute with John Giffard, the lordship passed to John de Braose of Glasbury (son of John de Braose) in 1275. In 1299, it passed to Margaret Longespee and her husband Henry de Lacy, 3rd Earl of Lincoln and in 1330 to Roger Mortimer, 1st Earl of March. The lordship was seized by the crown in 1331, and granted to Eubulo le Strange, but returned to Mortimer's grandson Roger Mortimer, 2nd Earl of March in 1354 and in 1360 to his son Edmund Mortimer, 3rd Earl of March. In 1404, King Henry IV granted the lordship to Sir Robert Whitney "in consequence of his father...having been killed in the royal service and his property burnt by the Welsh rebels".

=== Glasbury Castle ===
Glasbury Castle, north of the river, was first mentioned in 1144 when it was granted (with the manor) to Walter de Clifford. In August 1233, the castle was attacked and captured by King Henry III following a baronial rebellion by the Cliffords, but little more is recorded after that, though it was still in existence in a survey of Glasbury Manor dated 1561 Remains of its earthworks were visible near the centre of the village until housing development in the 1970s.

=== Split between Radnorshire and Brecknockshire ===
Following the end of the semi-autonomous Marcher Lordships with the Laws in Wales Acts 1535–1542, the parish and village of Glasbury north of the Wye together with the village south of the Wye were placed in the hundred of Painscastle in the county of Radnorshire, whilst the outlying parts of the parish south of the Wye (including Felindre, Pipton, and Tregoyd) were placed in the hundred of Talgarth in the county of Brecknockshire. This continued till 1844, when all of Glasbury south of the Wye was transferred to Brecknockshire.

== The village today ==
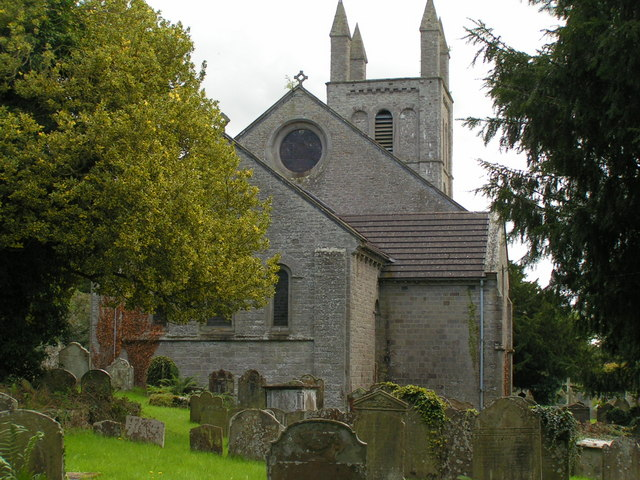
St Peter's church

=== Two ecclesiastical parishes ===
Following floods in the mid seventeenth century, the River Wye changed course and the old parish church of St Peter's found itself south (rather than north) of the river and subsequently fell into disrepair. A new one was built still further south in 1661, though the current building dates from 1837. It is now a Grade II listed building. In 1883, a second church was built north of the river and the Radnorshire side of the village transferred to the new parish of Glasbury, All Saints. The Old Vicarage, overlooking the river just to the south of Glasbury Bridge, is a hall house dating from the 15th century, and a Grade I listed building.

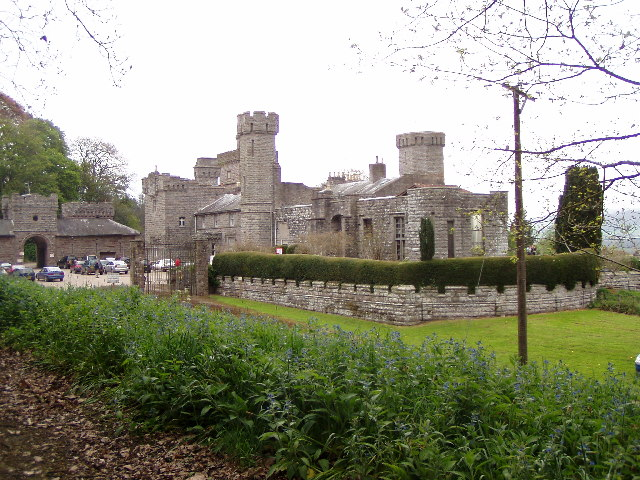
Maesllwch Castle

=== Maesllwch Castle ===
Maesllwch Castle, overlooking Glasbury to the north, was built close to an original hall house of the Vaughan family which was later owned by Charles Lloyd. The house was rebuilt by the Howorths in 1715, when the surrounding park was also established. The current building was grandly conceived in castellated style by the architect Robert Lugar for the de Winton family in the mid-nineteenth century. In the Second World War it was requisitioned and used as a Canadian hospital and subsequently by the Land Army. Part of the castle was later demolished to reduce the costs of upkeep, but it remains an imposing private residence and a Grade II listed building. The gardens and park are listed at Grade II* on the Cadw/ICOMOS Register of Parks and Gardens of Special Historic Interest in Wales.

=== Maesyronnen Chapel and the non-conformists ===
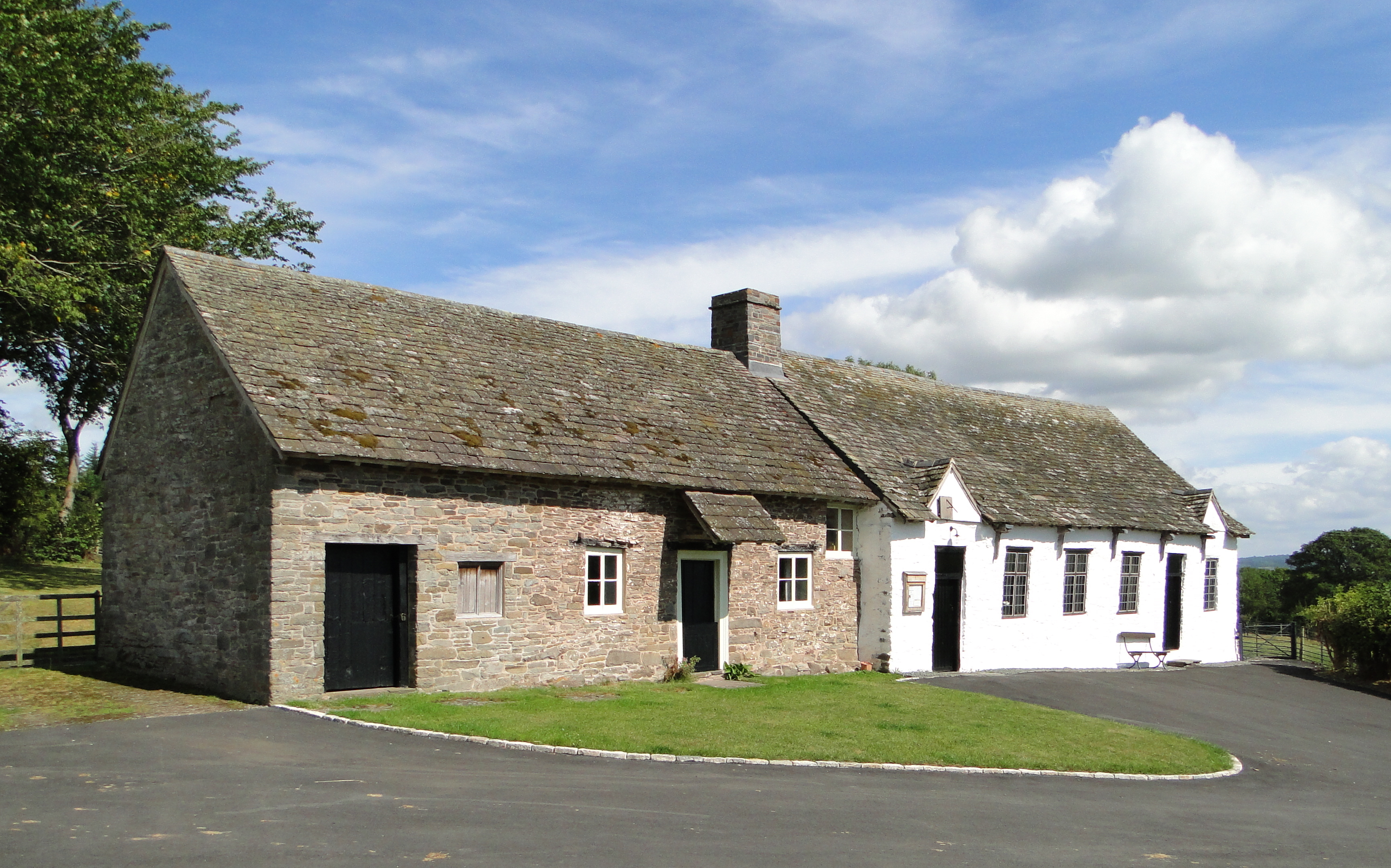
Maesyronnen Chapel

The early puritan non-conformist Vavasor Powell is believed to have first started his preaching career to the north of the village in the 1640s. The 1654 pamphlet 'Hue and cry after Mr Vavasor Powell' was written by Alexander Griffith, vicar of Glasbury, who had been expelled from the living by Vavasor and others for "drunkenness and lasciviousness".

Maesyronnen chapel was founded around 1691 on land donated by Charles Lloyd, squire of Maesllwch. It is considered the most important surviving building associated with the non-conformist movement in Wales and lays claim to being the first and oldest chapel in Wales. It is now a Grade I listed building, still used and maintained by the United Reformed Church. A much later United Reformed chapel was built on the village green in "Gothic style" in 1866, but is now a private residence. It remains a Grade II listed building.

The Methodist chapel at Cwmbach in the north of the village dates from 1818, when local farmer Richard Hergest received a revelation that it should be built in his meadow. It is also a Grade II listed building and remains in use.

The Baptist chapel at Treble Hill, just south of and conveniently close to the River Wye, was built in "temple style" in 1866 and closed in 2010. It remains a Grade II listed building.

=== Glasbury Bridge ===
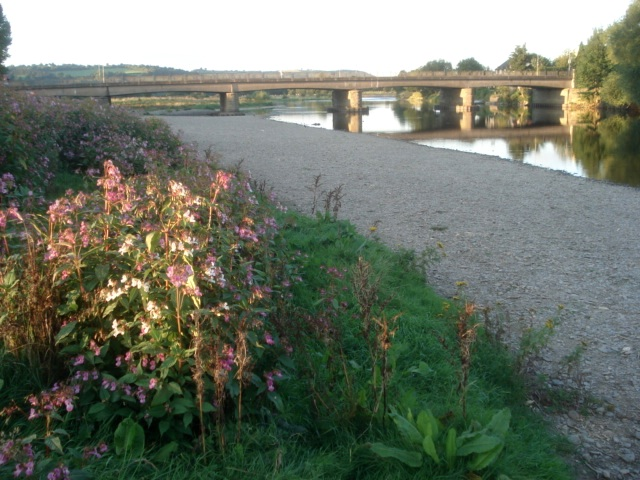
Bridge at Glasbury

Glasbury Bridge has repeatedly been destroyed by floods. A wooden bridge was washed away in 1738, a replacement in 1777 and a stone bridge in 1795. In 1850, a dispute between Brecknockshire and Radnorshire over costs for a new bridge led to the construction of a compromise half-wooden (Radnorshire), half-stone (Brecknockshire) bridge. The current six-span masonry bridge was built in 1923.

=== Turnpikes, tramway, and railway ===
Glasbury was and still is on the main road between Brecon and Hereford and Brecon and Hay-on-Wye. These roads were formerly turnpikes and a turnpike toll house (now a private residence) still remains on the northern edge of the village. In 1843 a royal commission of inquiry took evidence that "The Glasbury gates are a great inconvenience" since "persons travelling from one part of the village to the other pay two tolls", one to the Radnorshire and one to the Brecknockshire trust. This provoked an incident during the Rebecca Riots of 1843-44 when one of the Glasbury turnpike gates was destroyed.

A tramway connecting Hay-on-Wye with the Brecknock and Abergavenny Canal ran through Glasbury, on the southern side of the river. Called the Hay Railway, it was horse-drawn, carried coal, limestone, and agricultural produce, and opened on 7 May 1816. The stations were known as 'wharves' and Glasbury Wharf was at Llwynau-bach, to the south-east of the village, where traces of stabling for the draught horses remain.

The tramway was replaced by the Hereford, Hay and Brecon Railway which opened for traffic in 1864 and closed in 1962. The route mostly followed the old tramway. Glasbury Station was in the Treble Hill area in the south of the village, where three railway bridges are still standing.

=== Inns and shops ===
Foyles of Glasbury (formerly the Maesllwch Arms) in the northern half of the village is an old coaching inn with stables and is a Grade II listed building. Though no longer on the main road, it still offers accommodation as well as food and drink, as does the Harp Inn on the southern side. Glasbury still retains a post office that operates from inside Glasbury Service Station. The red telephone box on the northern side, near Glasbury House, has now been turned into a book exchange.

=== Canoeing and outdoor activities ===
Glasbury is a centre for canoeing and kayaking on the River Wye and for walking and other activities in the Black Mountains. Two outdoor education centres are based in the village: Woodlands Outdoor Education Centre, owned by Oxfordshire County Council, and The River Wye Activity Centre, formerly owned by the London Borough of Redbridge. Both offer accommodation and a range of activities for young people.

=== Glasbury Arts ===
Since 2007, Glasbury has hosted an annual autumn to spring festival of events and workshops, celebrating literature, theatre, music and the visual arts. Guests have included harpist Catrin Finch, singers Coope Boyes and Simpson, Kiki Dee, Julie Felix, John Kirkpatrick, Isla St Clair and local writer Jenny Valentine.

Renamed "Buryglaze", Glasbury features as one of the locales for Peter Greenaway's 1978 short film, Vertical Features Remake.

== Community ==
Following local government reorganisation in 1974, the village of Glasbury was split between two communities. The southern (Brecknockshire) part of the village was placed in the community of Gwernyfed together with the neighbouring villages of Three Cocks (Aberllynfi) and Felindre. The northern (Radnorshire) part of the village was placed in the misleadingly named community of Glasbury together with the neighbouring villages of Boughrood, Llanstephan and Llowes.

== Orchards and the 'Glasbury' apple ==
In 1815, the late Rev. John Hughes, curate of Glasbury, was described as "an active and zealous orchard-planter" who "introduced grafts from vigorous-bearing trees of the choicest cyder sorts". Perhaps as a result of his endeavours, a 1912 guide book referred to Glasbury "nestling in a circle of orchards", some few of which survive to this day.

An apple cultivar called 'Glasbury' is still obtainable. It is a dessert apple, said to have originated in Norfolk in 1872, presumably from seeds or cuttings taken from Glasbury. Curiously, another cultivar called 'Glasbury' was recommended as a cider apple in a book published in 1835, but this earlier apple now seems to be unknown.

== Kilvert country ==
Francis Kilvert was curate of the nearby village of Clyro from 1865 to 1872. Glasbury is mentioned several times - often as "sweet Glasbury" - in his published diaries. The diaries describe Kilverts unrequited love. He sought permission to marry Frances Eleanor Jane Thomas but was refused by her father William Jones Thomas. The area known as "Kilvert country" includes Glasbury and Hay-on-Wye, Clyro, Capel-y-ffin, Llowes, Llanigon, Painscastle, Clifford and Whitney-on-Wye.

== Natural history ==
Glasbury still lies entirely within the vice-county of Radnorshire for the purposes of biological recording. Plant and lichen records are thus included in the Flora of Radnorshire.

The Brecknock Wildlife Trust nature reserve known as ‘Glasbury Cutting’ has been created from part of the disused Hereford, Hay and Brecon Railway line and is to the east of Glasbury, on the B4350 towards Hay-on-Wye. The reserve is home to rare dormice which were discovered there in 2000.

== Governance ==
The Glasbury community is part of a larger Glasbury electoral ward which elects a county councillor to Powys County Council. Since a by-election in August 2015 the councillor has been Liberal Democrat James Gibson-Watt, who used to represent nearby Hay-on-Wye.

== Notable people ==
- Thomas Stock (1750–1803), parish vicar from 1778–1803
- Mary Morgan (1788–1805), servant in Presteigne, convicted and hanged for killing her newborn child.
- Francis Huntly Griffith JP, (1885–1958), politician and tea and rubber planter in Ceylon.
- Colwyn Edward Vulliamy (1886–1971), an Anglo-Welsh biographer and author.
- Anna McMorrin (born 1971), politician, MP for Cardiff North, grew up in Glasbury

== See also ==
- Humphrey Howorth
