= Francis Huntly Griffith =

Ceylonese planter (1885–1958)

Hon. Francis Huntly Griffith

Member of the Ceylon Parliament for Community (appointed member)
- In office 1947–1951
- Preceded by: seat created
- Succeeded by: Robert Singleton-Salmon

Personal details
- Born: 1885 Glasbury, Wales
- Died: July 1958 (aged 72–73) Melbourne, Victoria, Australia
- Spouse: Nancy Barton née Robinson
- Relations: Hubert George (father), Marion Douglas née Tucker (mother)
- Profession: tea planter

Francis Huntly Griffith JP, UM (1885 – 1958) was a tea and rubber planter in Ceylon and a member of parliament.

Francis Huntly Griffith was born in Glasbury, Wales, in 1885, the oldest of five children of Reverend Hubert George Griffith (c.1849-c.1927) the vicar of Glasbury and Marion Douglas née Tucker (1864-c.1942).

He travelled to Ceylon in 1909 taking up a position as a manager of a tea plantation in Matugama. In 1920 he took up the manager's role at a tea plantation in Agalawatta.

In October 1928 he married Nancy Barton née Robinson, the only daughter of Sir Arthur Robinson and Lady Annie Summers Robinson, in St. Paul's Church, Knightsbridge.

In 1931 he was elected as vice-president of the Planters' Association of Ceylon, the preeminent representative body of the country's tea industry.

On 12 March 1936 he was appointed as a nominated member of the State Council of Ceylon.

Following Ceylon's first parliamentary elections in 1947, Griffith was appointed as a member of the Ceylon House of Representatives. He was one of six members appointed by the Governor-General, to represent important interests which were not represented or inadequately represented in the House. He resigned from parliament in September 1951 and his position was filled by Robert Singleton-Salmon.

He and his wife migrated to Australia in 1952, where they resided in Ferny Creek, Victoria. Huntly died in July 1958 in Melbourne, Victoria.
