= Alexander Griffith =

Welsh royalist cleric (died 1676)

Alexander Griffith (died 21 April 1676) was a Welsh divine, a royalist and author.

== Life ==
Griffith was educated at Hart Hall, Oxford, matriculating 27 January 1614–15. After proceeding B.A. on 12 June 1618 he returned to Wales, keeping a school or holding a small cure. On 10 December 1631, then beneficed in South Wales, he graduated M.A.

During the English Civil War Griffith was deprived of his livings on account of his loyalty. After the Restoration, he regained possession of his benefices, and was presented to the vicarage of Glasbury, Brecknockshire, in 1661.

== Works ==
During the Interregnum, Griffith wrote Strena Vavasoriensis; or, a New Year's Gift for the Welsh Itinerants. Or an Hue and Cry after Mr. Vavasor Powell, Metropolitan of the Itinerants, and one of the Executioners of the Gospel by Colour of the late Act for the Propagation thereof in Wales, London, 1654. In the same year there also appeared his True and Perfect Relation of the whole Transaction concerning the Petition of the Six Counties of South Wales, and the County of Monmouth, formerly presented to the Parliament of the Commonwealth of England for a supply of Godly Ministers, and an Account of Ecclesiastical Revenues therein, London, 1654. He is supposed, too, to be the author, or part author, of a pamphlet entitled Mercurius Cambro-Britannicus; or, News from Wales, touching the miraculous Propagation of the Gospel in those parts, London, 1652.
