= Robert Singleton-Salmon =

British tea planter, businessman and member of parliament

Hon. Robert Singleton Salmon CBE

Member of the Ceylon Parliament for Community (appointed member)
- In office 1951–1970
- Preceded by: Francis Huntly Griffith
- Succeeded by: position abolished

Personal details
- Born: 24 October 1897 Liverpool, Lancashire, England
- Died: 1970
- Relations: Frederick George Burton (father)
- Profession: tea planter, politician

Robert Singleton Salmon, CBE, JP (24 October 1897 – 1970) was a British tea planter, businessman and a member of parliament.

Robert Singleton Salmon was born on 24 October 1897 in Toxteth Park, Liverpool, Lancashire, the youngest son of Frederick George Burton Salmon, an Irish shopfitter, builder and joiner, and Elizabeth Anne. On 24 August 1916, at the age of 18, he enlisted in the King's Regiment (Liverpool) and reached the rank of corporal before being discharged in March 1919. In 1925 he travelled to Ceylon, taking up planting as a career.

In 1950 he was appointed to the Senate of Ceylon, resigning in 1951 to accept an appointment to the first House of Representatives (1947–52), following the resignation of Francis Huntly Griffith. He served as a member of Parliament until 1970, having been re-appointed by each successive government. In the 1950 King's Birthday Honours he was appointed a Commander of the Order of the British Empire, for his services to the Planters' Association of Ceylon.

Singleton-Salmon was the president of the Ceylon Road Federation, a Life Member of the Ceylon Planters' Association, the Patron of Planters' Benevolent Fund; Chairman of British Ceylon Corporation Ltd. and Great Western Tea Company of Ceylon Ltd., Chairman of Planters' Association of Ceylon (1945–47), Chairman of Board of Tea Research Institute of Ceylon (1946), and Chairman of Ceylon Tea Propaganda Board (1950–51).
