= Sir William Powell, 1st Baronet =

Member of the Parliament of England

Escutcheon of the Powell baronets of Pengethly

Sir William Powell, 1st Baronet (c. 1624 – 2 December 1680) was an English politician who sat in the House of Commons in 1660.

Powell was born as William Hinson, the son of Thomas Hinson of Dublin and his wife Anne Powell, daughter of Edward Powell of Fulham. His uncle, Sir Edward Powell, 1st Baronet of Pengethly, left him his estates on condition that he changed his name to Powell.

He sat on the bench as a justice of the peace for Middlesex from 1650 to 1654 and Herefordshire from 1677 to his death and appointed High Sheriff of Herefordshire for 1657–58.

In 1660, Powell was elected member of parliament for Herefordshire in the Convention Parliament. He was created baronet on 25 January 1661 under the recreated baronetcy of Pengethly.

Powell married firstly, Mary, Lady Brydges, widow of Sir John Brydges, 2nd Baronet of Wilton Castle, and daughter of John Pearle of Aconbury, in Herefordshire. He married secondly Katherine Zouch, daughter of Dr Richard Zouch, judge of the Admiralty. He had no male heir and the baronetcy became extinct on his death. His daughter Mary married Sir John Williams, 2nd Baronet, of Eltham.

Parliament of England
Preceded by Not represented in the Rump Parliament	Member of Parliament for Herefordshire; 1660–1661; With: Edward Harley	Succeeded by James Scudamore; Thomas Prise
Baronetage of England
New creation	Baronet (of Pengethly); 1661–1680	Extinct
