= Llanstephan, Powys =

Coordinates: 52.068°N 3.286°W

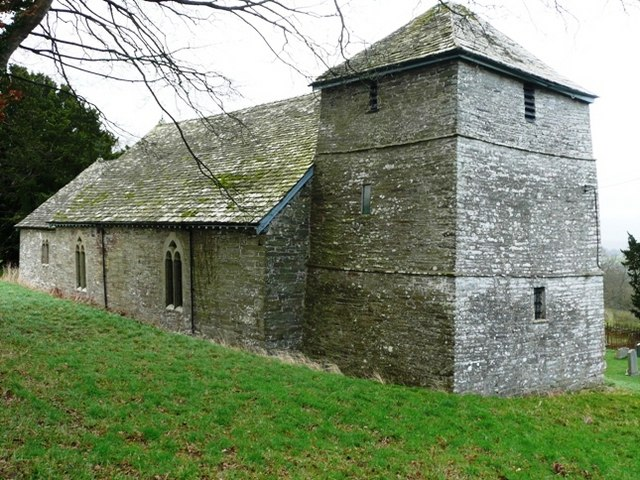
Llanstephan church

Llanstephan is a small rural settlement in the community of Glasbury, Powys (formerly Radnorshire), Wales. Until 1983 Llanstephan was a community itself.

Llanstephan is centred around the isolated church of St Stephen (or Ystyffan). Llanstephan is first recorded as Llanytyffaen wen in the 15th century, with the 'wen' probably referring to the whitewash of the church. The church appears to date from the 13th or 14th century, with a two-and-half stage tower. The building was described in 1859 as not in good condition, but was re-roofed and repaired in 1867–68.

Llanstephan House was demolished in 1972 and subsequently rebuilt. It was originally a tall, three-gabled house dating from the mid 1800s; it was remodelled in the 1920s. Other buildings of note include two early cruck frame houses. Dolwen is a few hundred yards south east of the church and has a Tudor door; Celyn, a mile north east, is now ruined but was originally a long house.

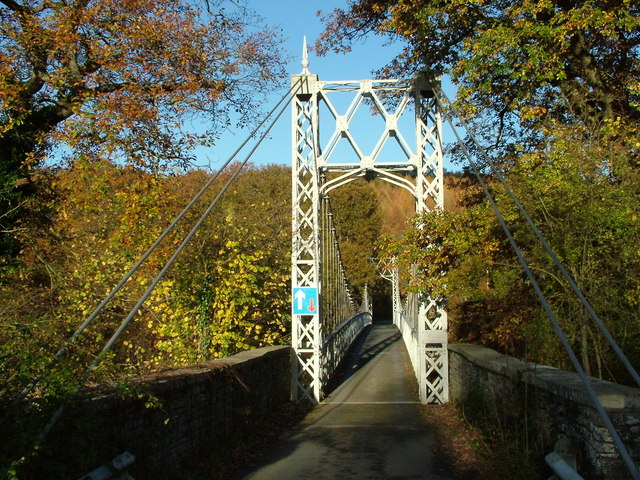
Lady Milford's Bridge

A suspension bridge was built across the nearby River Wye in 1922 by David Rowell & Company.

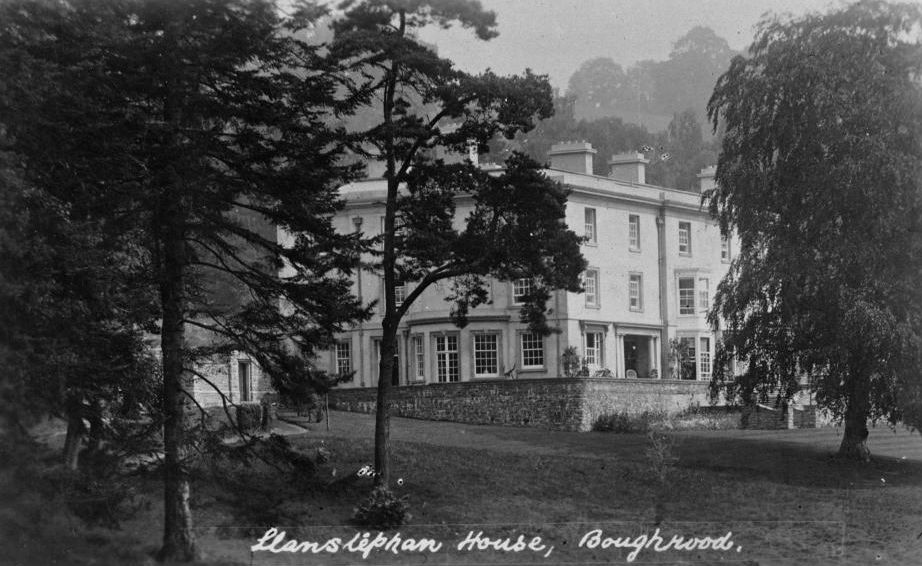
Llanstephan House (1910)

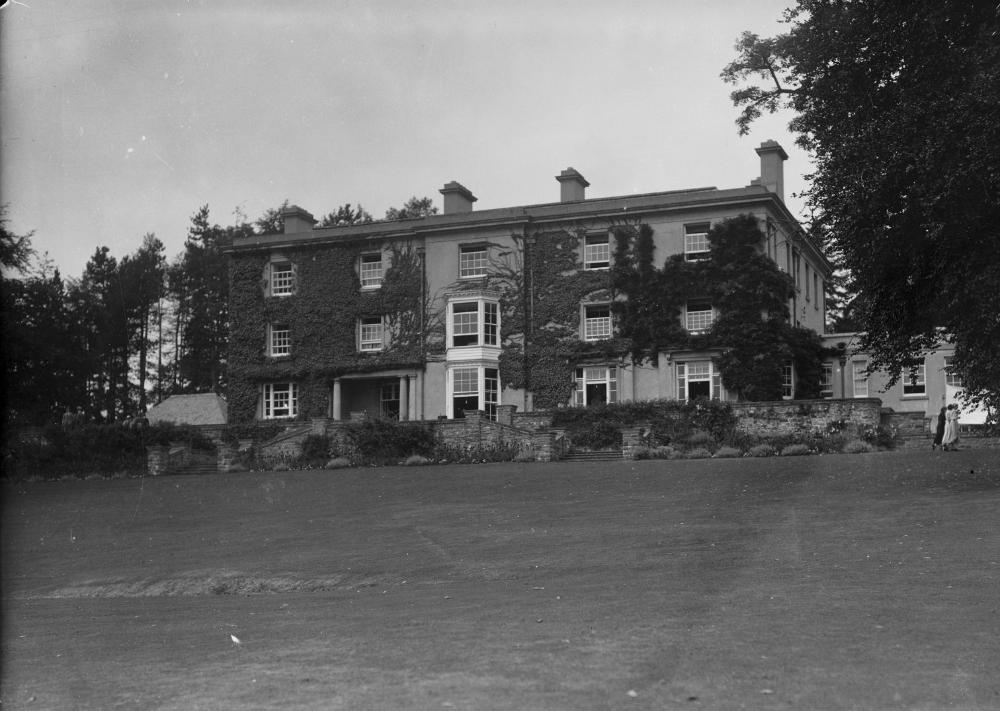
Llanstephan House (1910)

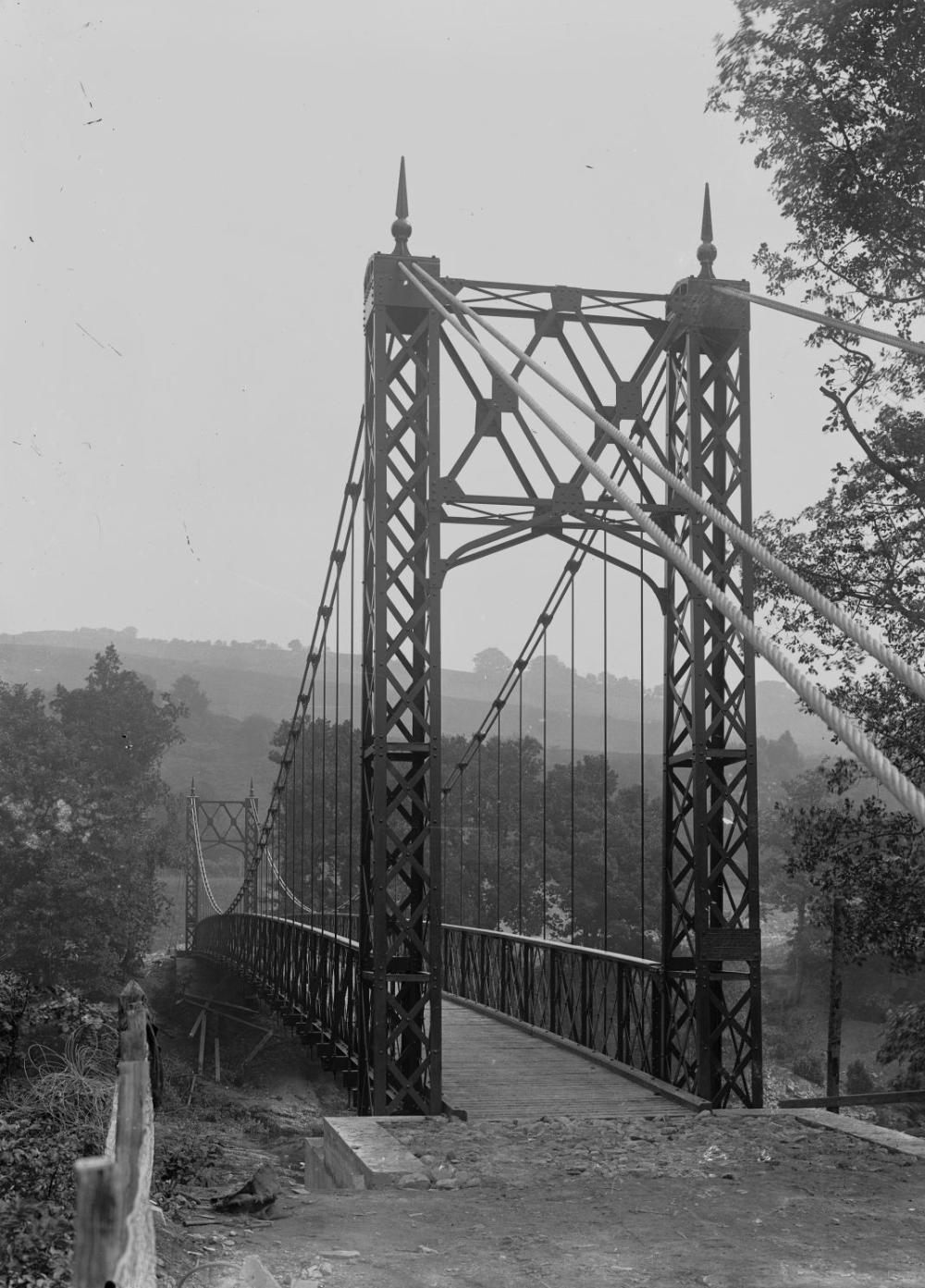
Llanstephan bridge (1910)

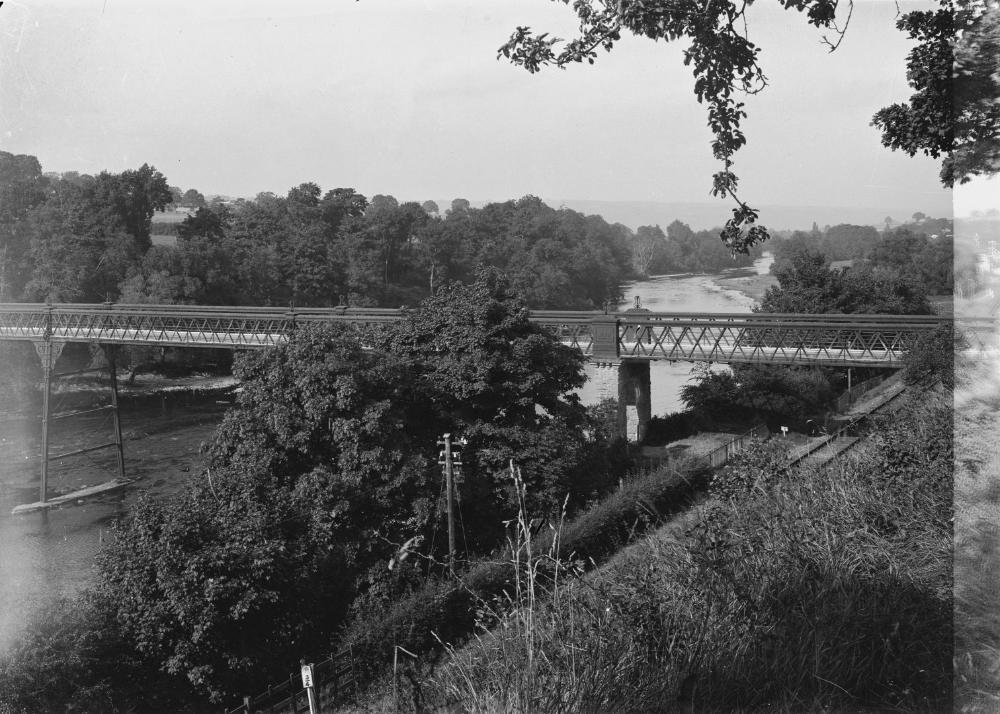
Llanstephan bridge (1910)
