= Edward Williams (died 1721) =

British politician

Sir Edward Williams (1659–1721) of Gwernyfed, Brecknockshire, was a British politician who sat in the English House of Commons between 1697 and 1708 and in the British House of Commons from 1708 to 1721.

== Early life ==
Williams was the second son of Sir Thomas Williams of Elham, Kent and his first wife Anne Hogbeane, daughter of John Hogbeane of Elham. His father was the Royal Physician to King Charles II. He was baptised at Elham, Kent on 6 November 1659. By 1675 he had been knighted and was married by licence dated 9 July 1675 to Elizabeth Williams, the daughter and coheir of Sir Henry Williams of Gwernyfed. This marriage brought him a modest estate in Breconshire, a county he represented in Parliament for seventeen years.

== Political career ==
Williams, a high Tory, was elected Member of Parliament for Breconshire in a contested by-election on 17 February 1697 but did not stand at the succeeding general election in 1698. He was High Sheriff of Breconshire for the year 1698 to 1699. He had difficulties obtaining private legislation in 1703 and 1704 and decided to stand for parliament again at the 1705 general election when he was elected MP for Breconshire again in a contest. He was returned unopposed at Breconshire in 1708, 1710, 1713 and 1715.

== Death and legacy ==
Williams died on 28 July 1721, and was buried at Aberllynfi. He and Elizabeth had four children:.

- Henry Williams (died 1723)
- Thomas Williams (ed. 1720), Doctor of Laws
- Edward Williams (died 1715)
- Sir David Williams (died 1740), succeeded his uncle, Sir John Williams to the Williams baronetcy

Parliament of England
Preceded by Edward Jones	Member of Parliament for Breconshire; 1697-1698	Succeeded by Sir Rowland Gwynne
Preceded by John Jeffreys	Member of Parliament for Breconshire; 1705-1707	Succeeded by Parliament of Great Britain
Parliament of Great Britain
Preceded by Parliament of England	Member of Parliament for Breconshire; 1707-1721	Succeeded by William Gwyn Vaughan
