= Old Vicarage, Glasbury =

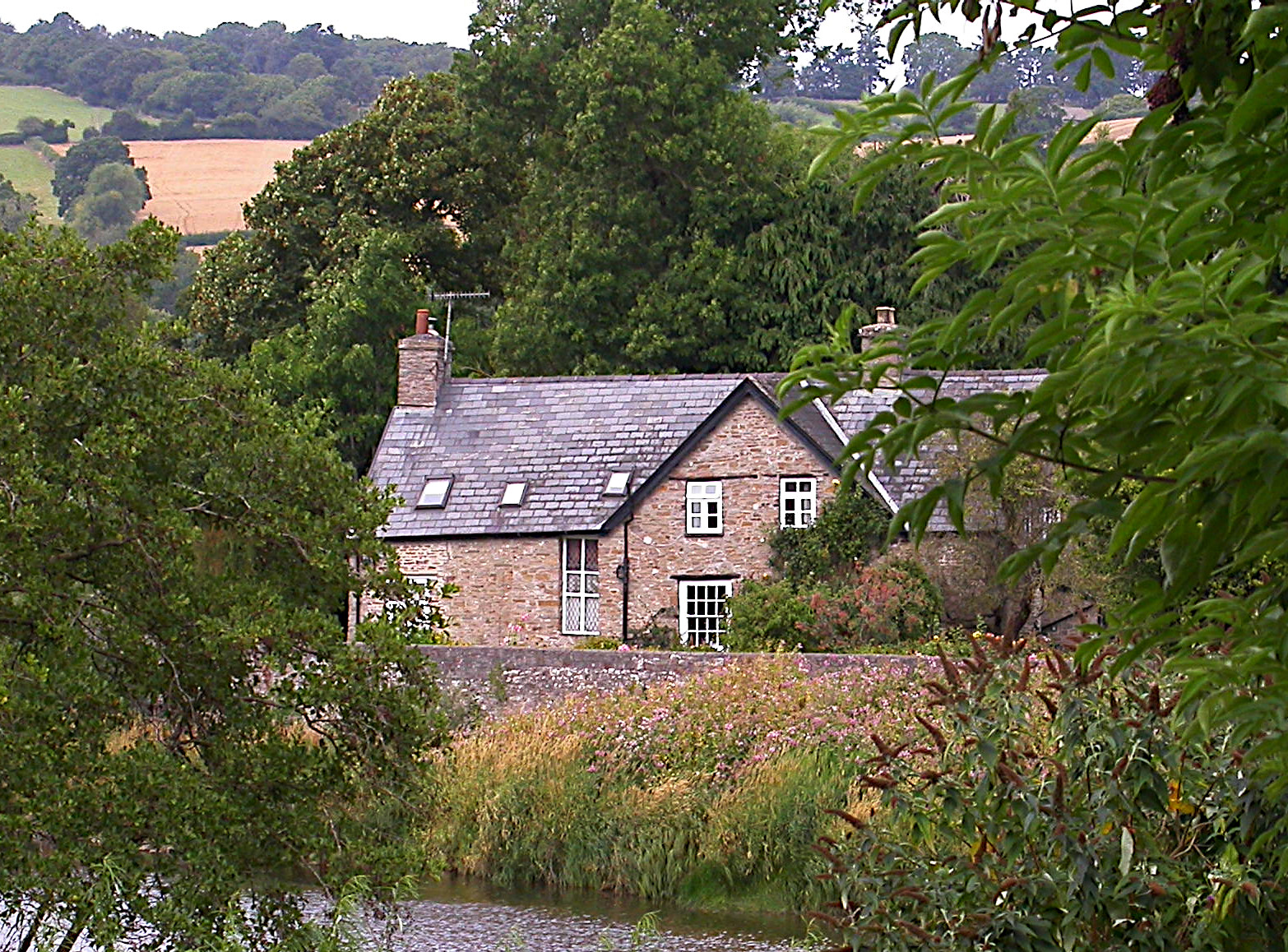
- View of the Old Vicarage from across the River Wye

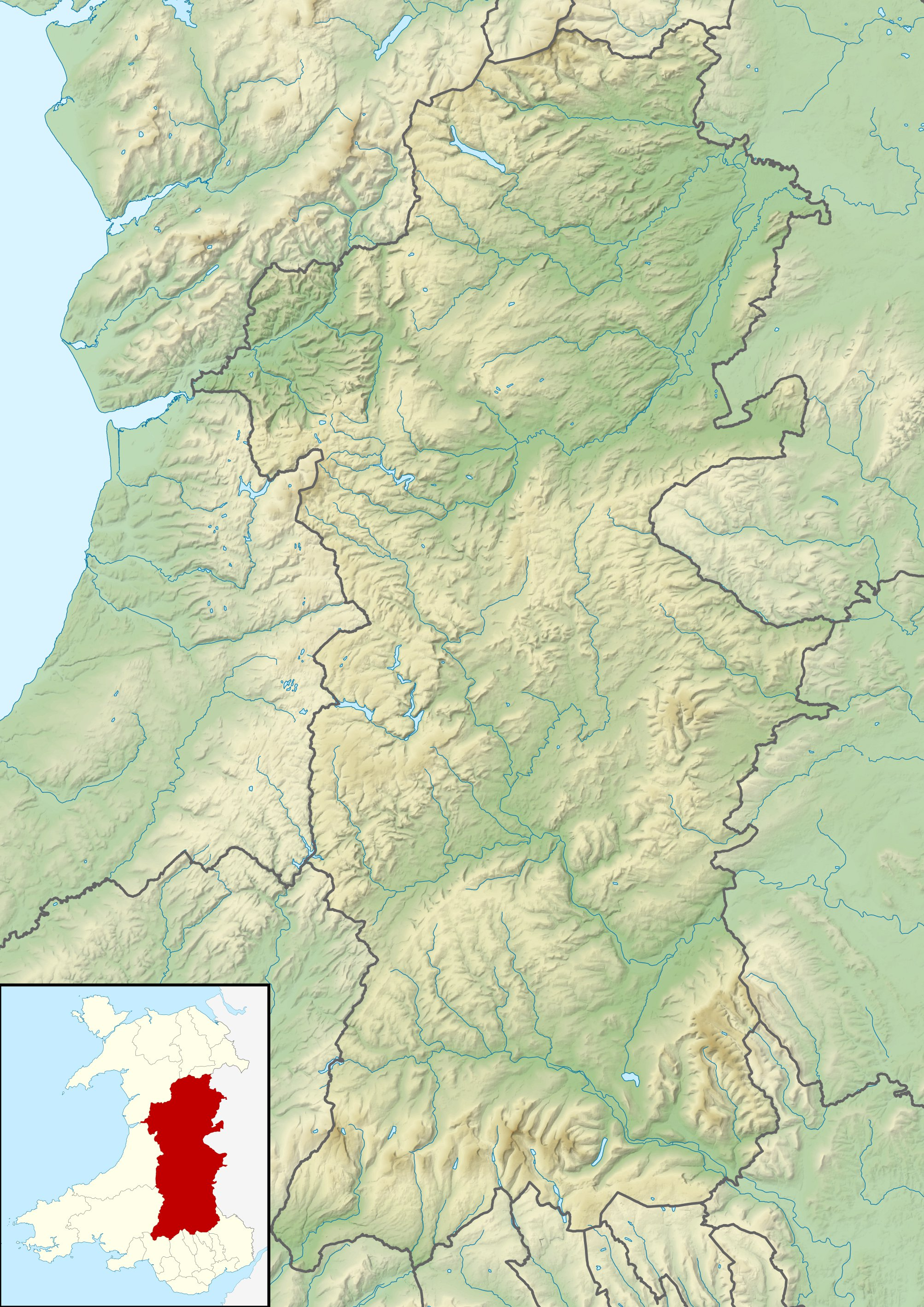
- Location within Powys
- 52.0436°N 3.2011°W
- Type: Hall house
- Location: Glasbury, Powys, Wales

History
- Built: Medieval

Site notes
- Architectural style: Vernacular
- Governing body: Privately owned

Listed Building – Grade I
- Official name: Old Vicarage
- Designated: 25 February 1952
- Reference no.: 8734

Listed Building – Grade II*
- Official name: Barn at Old Vicarage (including attached granary and stores)
- Designated: 18 September 1960
- Reference no.: 8755

The Old Vicarage is a house dating from the medieval period in the community of Glasbury, Powys, Wales. Now a private house, it is a Grade I listed building.

== History and description ==
The origins of the building are of the 15th century. Both Cadw and Robert Scourfield and Richard Haslam, in their Powys volume in the Buildings of Wales series, suggest that it was established as a form of grange by St Peter's Abbey, Gloucester. This interpretation is supported by the large tithe barn which stands adjacent to the vicarage. In the 17th century, the resident vicar was Alexander Griffith, (died 21 April 1676), a Welsh divine and author. (Note: Alexander Griffith was a staunch Royalist and the author of numerous propaganda tracts supporting various causes he held dear.) The vicarage was sold in the 20th century, and is now a private house.

The vicarage was built to a Hall-house plan, and was subsequently altered in around 1611. Single-storyed, it is constructed of sandstone rubble with dormer windows under a slate roof. There is a large amount of original, and elaborate, wood carving, centred on three cruck trusses with decorated wall and king posts. Those in the hall are "fine and unmutilated". The Royal Commission on the Ancient and Historical Monuments of Wales describes them as "exceptionally ornate". The vicarage is a Grade I listed building (Note: The Glasbury Historical Society records the building's grading as Grade II*, its original status when listed in 1952. This was upgraded by Cadw to Grade I in 1996.) and the adjacent tithe barn is listed at Grade II*. The Clwyd-Powys Archaeological Trust considers the vicarage to be, "one of the best preserved of the smaller medieval houses in the region".

== Sources ==
- Scourfield, Robert; Haslam, Richard (2013). Powys: Montgomeryshire, Radnorshire and Breconshire. The Buildings of Wales. New Haven, US and London: Yale University Press. ISBN 978-0-300-18508-9. OCLC 863678002.
