= Gwernyfed High School =

Secondary School in Powys, Wales

Coordinates: 52.0284°N 3.2023°W

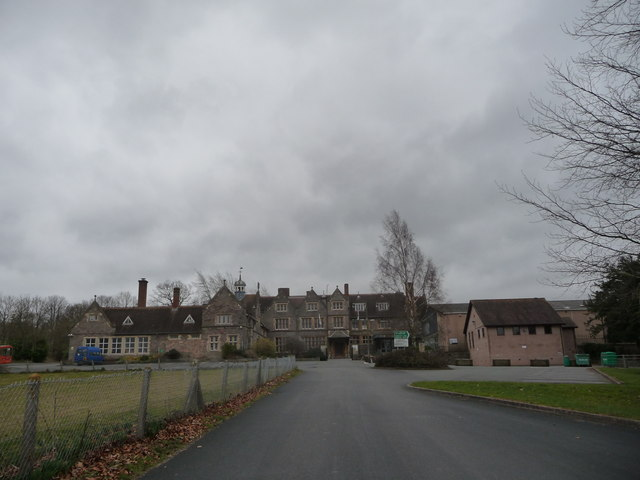
Gwernyfed High School

Gwernyfed High School is an old manor house turned into a high school in the village of Three Cocks, Brecon, Powys, Wales. The school is an English-medium school educating students between 11 and 19 years old from a mainly rural catchment area.

It first opened as a school in 1950, previously being open as a munitions factory during World War 2. It currently has around 520 pupils. Founded in 1972, the school is housed in a Grade II listed Victorian mansion, Gwernyfed Park, which was designed by renowned architect William Eden Nesfield. With a rich history dating back to the Iron Age, the school is situated on a historic site that has been home to Welsh princes and landed gentry. As of the year 2000 a modern block was built to house science, ICT and language classrooms as well as a drama studio. There is a building commissioned in 2008 which provides a dining hall and sports facilities. There are several acres of sports fields including rugby pitches, football and hockey pitches, athletics track, hardcourts and astro pitches. The grounds include listed rose gardens, orchards, pond and wildlife area and a stream.

Gwernyfed High School is situated in a rural location between the towns of Hay-on-Wye and Talgarth in the county of Powys, Wales and is located very close to the border with England. The school's catchment area spans across a wide rural region, encompassing small villages and hamlets in the surrounding countryside.

== History ==
=== Ancient history ===
The site of Gwernyfed High School was once held by a Welsh prince, Einion Sais, who fought at the Battle of Crecy in 1346 on the side of Edward III and his son The Black Prince. The coat of arms that he wore on his shield was ‘argent, three cocks, gules’, which means three red cocks on a silver shield. This is the origin of the name of the village of Three Cocks and the emblem of the school.

In 1600, David Williams bought Old Gwernyfed from John Gunter. The Williams family were from Ystalyfera and they inherited an old medieval house that had been rebuilt in 1450, along with an estate of nearly 4000 acres. In 1633, they modernised the house by adding an extra storey, dormers and landscaped gardens. However, in the late eighteenth century, the west wing of the house was gutted by fire and the family moved away. The house was then occupied by various farm tenants and gradually deteriorated.

In 1804, Sir Edward Williams, the last male heir of the Williams family, died and the Gwernyfed Estate passed to his daughter who was married to Thomas Wood. The Wood family decided to build a new home within the old deer park and commissioned William Eden Nesfield, a famous architect of Gothic Revival style, to design it. The construction started in 1877 and took three years to complete. The mansion house was built as a wedding gift and had four reception rooms, twenty two bedrooms, seven bathrooms and an oak staircase.

=== 20th century ===
The site had been used as a munitions factory during World War II, and some of the buildings from that period still remain on the grounds. The school started with 168 pupils and 11 staff, and offered its first external examinations in 1960. Three pupils took G.C.E. level examinations in English Language, English Literature, Mathematics, Chemistry and Biology, and two of them passed in all five subjects. The school also had a farm with 40 acres of land, which was set up in 1962 but did not receive new buildings until 1968.

=== Modern era ===
In 1971, the school was re-named as Gwernyfed High School and entered the modern era. The school expanded its facilities and curriculum over the years, adding a modern block with classrooms and a drama studio, a new building with a dining hall and sports facilities, and several acres of sports fields with various pitches and courts. The school also has a listed rose garden, an orchard, a pond and wildlife area, and a stream on its grounds. The school currently has around 500 pupils and offers a range of subjects and qualifications, including GCSEs, A-levels, BTECs, Welsh Baccalaureate, Level 2 Award Certificates and Duke of Edinburgh Award.

== Performance ==
Gwernyfed High School was previously placed into special measures by Estyn school inspectors. According to a report by inspectors, the school had failed to make sufficient progress to address previous concerns. The school was told to improve in five areas after a report in 2020. It was told to improve the progress that all pupils make in lessons, including in the development of their literacy and numeracy skills and Welsh language development. However, two years on, inspectors said that in the majority of cases, pupils make limited progress from their starting points as a result of low expectations or over-direction by teachers, with teaching often ineffective.

In 2023 officers from Powys County Council, including school improvement officers, supported Gwernyfed High School after it was placed in special measures. Lynette Lovell, the Director of Education, told councillors there is work to do "and that’s why we’ve extended the secondary school improvement team". Gwernyfed High School was required to develop an action plan to address the recommendations made by Estyn. As part of the council's draft budget, schools were to receive an additional £4.5m and the education department to receive an additional £1.1m.

After an inspection in 2024 by Estyn, the school was removed from special measures as the inspectors believed that the school had sufficiently improved.
