= William Morgan (of Dderw) =

Welsh lawyer and politician

Personal details
- Born: c. 1582
- Died: 1649
- Spouse: Elizabeth Morgan m. 1633
- Relations: William Morgan (of Tredegar) (father-in-law); William Morgan (of Machen and Tredegar) (son-in-law)
- Children: at least 2, including his 'only son' and heir William Morgan (1638-58)
- Parent: Llewellyn Morgan
- Occupation: lawyer & politician

William Morgan (c. 1582 – 1649) was a Welsh lawyer and politician who sat in the House of Commons from 1628 to 1649.

== Early life ==
Morgan was born circa 1582, the son of Llewellyn Morgan of Ystradfellte.

== Career ==
He was called to the bar. He purchased the estate of Dderw in Llyswen. He was a Recorder of Brecon from 1637, and was King's attorney in South Wales until his death.

In 1628, Morgan was elected a Member of Parliament for Monmouth Boroughs. He was later elected in April 1640 for Breconshire in the Short Parliament, re-elected for Breconshire for the Long Parliament in November 1640 and sat until his death in 1649. In February 1649, information was laid against him that he had supported the Royalist cause in the Civil War, raising money and arms for the king and sitting in the King's parliament in Oxford.

Parliament of England
Preceded by William Fortune	Member of Parliament for Monmouth Boroughs; 1628–1629	Parliament suspended until 1640
Vacant Parliament suspended since 1629	Member of Parliament for Breconshire; 1640–1649	Succeeded by Philip Jones

== Family ==
In 1603, Morgan married Elizabeth Morgan (1583-1638), daughter of Sir William Morgan of Tredegar. With whom he had issue (in no particular order):

1. Blanche Morgan, she married William Morgan (of Machen and Tredegar).
2. William Morgan, who was High Sheriff in 1655.

Morgan died in 1649 and was buried in the Priory Church, Brecon. He left the bulk of his estate to his 'only son', another William.
