= Thomas Stock (founder) =

British clergyman (1750-1803)

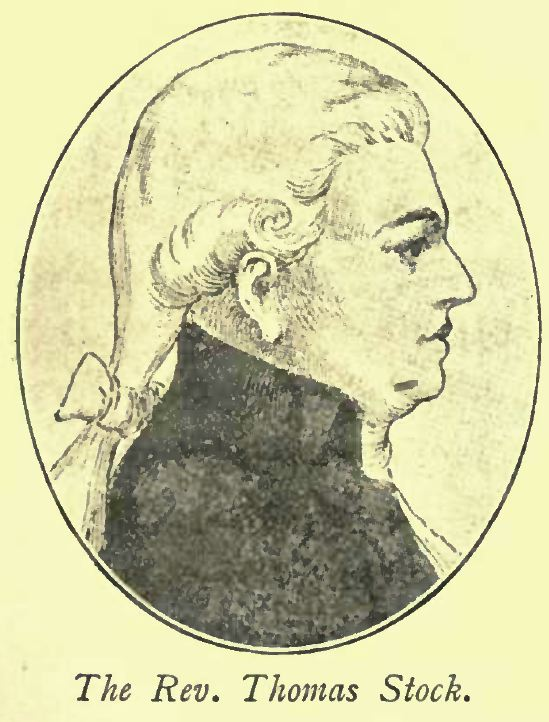
- Born: 1750
- Died: 1803

Thomas Stock (1750–1803) established the first Sunday school in the United Kingdom.

== Early life and education ==
Thomas was the son of Thomas Stock, gentleman of Gloucester. The young Thomas was sent to John Roysse's Free School in Abingdon-on-Thames (now Abingdon School), where he was a boarder from 1761 to 1767. After Abingdon, he gained a scholarship to Pembroke College, Oxford and graduated BA 1771.

== Career ==
Entering Holy Orders, Stock was elected to a college fellowship from 1771 to 1774 and then was curate at Ashbury in Berkshire (now Oxfordshire). While at Ashbury, he formed the first Sunday school in the country in 1777. Stock became rector of St Aldate's and then of St John Baptist's, Gloucester and headmaster of Gloucester Free School. He was also vicar of Glasbury-on-Wye. At Gloucester, jointly with Robert Raikes, proprietor of the Gloucester Journal, Stock became co-founder of the Sunday School movement.

From 1787 until his death in 1803 he was holding the living at his Gloucester incumbencies and headmastership.

== Memorials ==
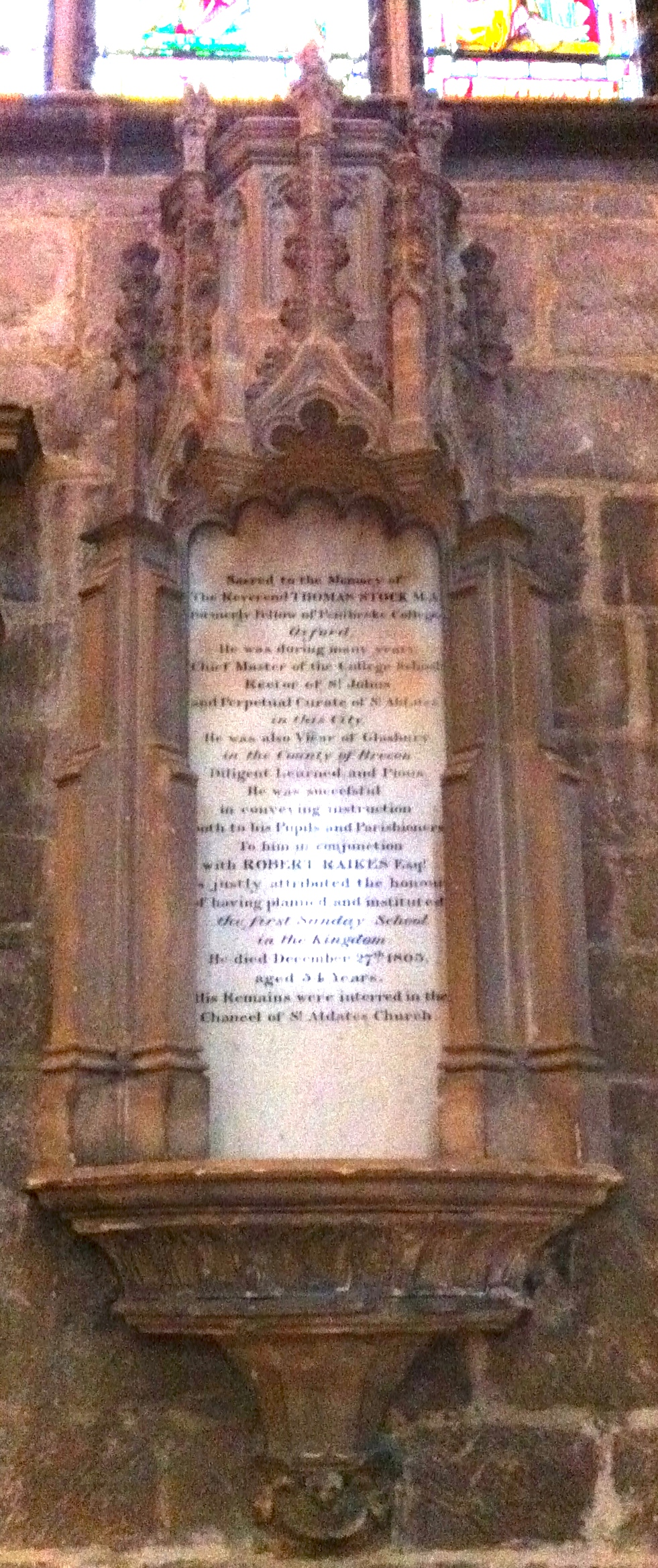
Memorial to Revd Thomas Stock in Gloucester Cathedral

There are memorials to Stock at Ashbury parish church and in the nave of Gloucester Cathedral. He was author of A Compendious Grammar of the Greek Language (1780). There is also a residential cul-de-sac, Thomas Stock Gardens, built in 1994–5 in the Abbeymead area of Gloucester on the western outskirts of Gloucester.

== See also ==
- List of Old Abingdonians
