= Y Dderw =

Listed house in Llyswen, Wales

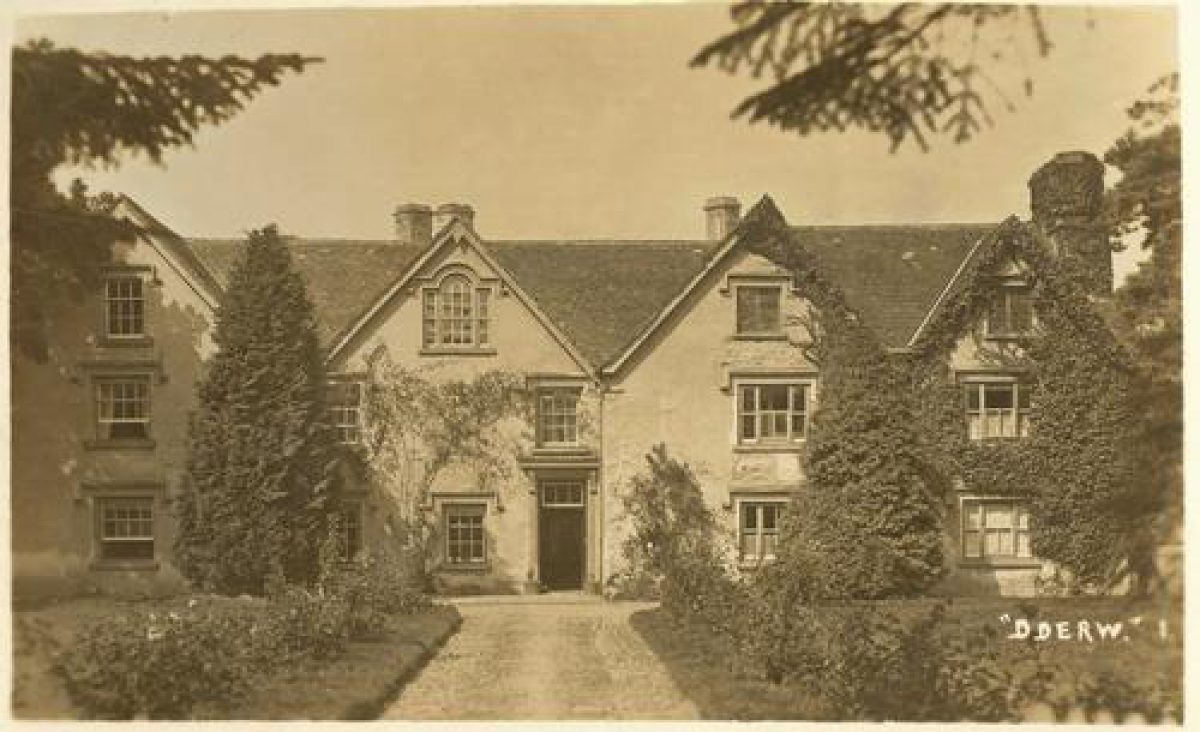
- Interactive map of Y Dderw area

General information
- Type: Country house
- Location: Llyswen, in Powys, Wales
- Coordinates: 52°01′50″N 3°15′18″W
- Years built: 16th century, including later additions

Listed Building – Grade II*
- Official name: Y Dderw
- Designated: 28 February 1952; 74 years ago
- Reference no.: 6650

Y Dderw (English: The Oak) is a Grade II*-listed country house in Llyswen, in Powys, Wales. The house was originally built in the 16th century but includes extensions and alterations made as late as the 19th century.

== History ==
Y Dderw was built in the second half of the 16th century. It was later purchased by William Morgan of Ystradfellte (d. 1649), son-in-law of Sir William Morgan of Tredegar (d. 1655). In an 1886 memorandum, Octavius Morgan, antiquarian and descendant of William of Ystradfellte, states that William bought Y Dderw in 1630 and suggests that at the time of writing, this date was "carved on the frieze over the chimney piece in the parlour". William of Ystradfellte was Recorder of Brecon from 1637, the king's Attorney for South Wales from 1639, and Member for Brecknock from 1640, all offices which he held until his death. The Dictionary of Welsh Biography states, "He built up a lucrative practice at the Bar, which enabled him to purchase extensive estates in Brecknock." As Morgan's son predeceased him, his estates passed to his daughter, Blanche (d. 1673), who in 1661 married her first cousin William Morgan of Machen and Tredegar (d. 1680). Y Dderw and the Brecknockshire estates thence formed part of the Tredegar Estate; this influx of wealth funded William of Machen and Tredegar's rebuilding of his Tudor manor into the present-day Tredegar House.

Cadw states that in the 17th century Y Dderw was leased to the Williams family. In the 18th century, the younger sons of Thomas Morgan of Ruperra (d. 1769), Charles (d. 1787) and John (d. 1792), were both, in turn, known as “of Dderw”, prior to their respective successions to the Tredegar Estate. In the 1886 memorandum previously cited, Octavius Morgan writes that the Morgans would "pass the month of September" at Y Dderw, but after 1817 they ceased to live there, and it became a farmhouse. In the 19th century, it was home-farm for Boughrood Castle, residence from the early 20th century of the Hon. Frederic Morgan (nephew of the then Lord Tredegar). In May 1921, Boughrood Castle was sold, and Frederic Morgan appears to have taken up residence at Y Dderw. In July, the Morgans disposed of the 1400-acre Dderw Estate by auction, but Y Dderw itself, including its farm of 422 acres, failed to sell. In September, the contents, outdoor effects and livestock were offered for sale by auction.

In 1938, the Western Mail described Y Dderw as "one of the finest farmhouses in Wales".

As of 2025, Y Dderw is a private house and part of a working farm. It was used in the filming of Out There, starring Martin Clunes.

== Architecture and description ==
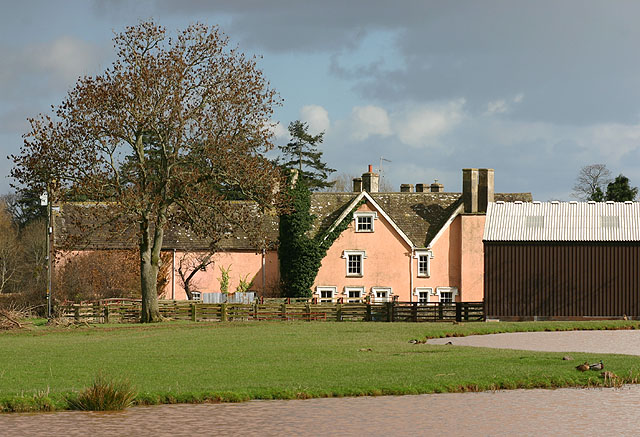
Y Dderw in 2007

Cadw states that the house was built in the second half of the 16th century and extended to the rear in the 17th and 19th centuries. It is built of stone, painted and roughcast, with slate roofs. The interior features a dog-legged staircase with a "very fine symmetrically turned balustrade". The main hall has a finger-moulded plaster ceiling, and the parlour features a Tudor arch to the fireplace, "ending in a pineapple-fleur-de-lys carved stop." In the farmyard are two Grade II-listed barns, both built in the 17th century and one rebuilt in the 19th century. Nearby are two mounds, of which one survives, which might be 16th- to 17th-century garden viewing platforms. Y Dderw was designated as Grade II* on 28 February 1952 "on account of retaining an important sub-medieval plan and well preserved structure, with some fine internal detail and good fenestration throughout."
