= Thomas Wood (1777–1860) =

English Tory and later Conservative politician

Member of Parliament for Breconshire
- In office 1806–1847
- Preceded by: Sir Charles Gould
- Succeeded by: Joseph Bailey

Personal details
- Born: 21 April 1777
- Died: 26 January 1860 (aged 82) Littleton, Middlesex
- Party: Tory, Conservative
- Spouse: Lady Caroline Stewart (1801–1860)
- Relations: Thomas Wood (grandfather); Sir Edward Williams, 5th Baronet (grandfather)
- Children: 6
- Parent(s): Thomas Wood; Mary Williams
- Education: Harrow School
- Alma mater: Oriel College, Oxford

Thomas Wood (21 April 1777 – 26 January 1860) was an English Tory and later Conservative politician who sat in the House of Commons from 1806 to 1847.

== Early life ==
Wood was the eldest son of fourteen children of Thomas Wood and Mary Williams, daughter and heiress of Sir Edward Williams, 5th Baronet, of Llangibby Castle. He was the grandson of Thomas Wood, who was MP for Middlesex from 1779 to 1780.

Wood was educated at Harrow School from 1788 to 1795 before matriculating at Oriel College, Oxford in 1796. The family had accumulated considerable estates at Middleham, Yorkshire, Gwernyfed in Wales and Littleton and Astlam in Middlesex.

== Career ==
In 1806, Wood was elected member of parliament (MP) for Breconshire. He held the seat until 1847. He was appointed High Sheriff of Breconshire for 1809 to 1810.

Wood commanded the Royal East Middlesex Militia for 56 years. Wood remained colonel of the Militia and encamped with them at Aldershot in his eightieth year. He succeeded to his mother's estates in 1820 and to his father's estates in 1835.

== Personal life ==
On 23 December 1801, he married Lady Caroline Stewart, daughter of Robert Stewart, 1st Marquess of Londonderry and Frances Stewart, Marchioness of Londonderry (daughter of the Whig politician Charles Pratt, 1st Earl Camden). Together, they had four sons and two daughters, including:

- Thomas Wood (1804–1872), who served as MP for Middlesex; he married Frances Smyth, a daughter of John Henry Smyth and Lady Elizabeth Anne Smyth (daughter of George FitzRoy, 4th Duke of Grafton).
- Sir Charles Alexander Wood (1810–1890), who married Sophia Ann Brownrigg, a daughter of John Studholme Brownrigg, a prominent merchant and MP for Boston.

Wood and his wife enjoyed the friendship of members of the royal family. George IV visited the Woods at Gwernyfed and other royals visited them at Littleton. William IV nominated Wood to be one of his executors.

He died at home in Littleton, at the age of 82.

Parliament of the United Kingdom
Preceded by Sir Charles Gould	Member of Parliament for Breconshire; 1806 – 1847	Succeeded by Joseph Bailey
