= Sir Thomas Williams, 1st Baronet =

Welsh medical doctor and politician

Sir Thomas Williams, 1st Baronet (c. 1621 – 1712) was a Welsh medical doctor and politician who sat in the House of Commons from 1675 to 1679. He was "Chymical Physician" to King Charles II.

== Early life ==
Williams was the son of Thomas Williams, of Talyllyn, Breconshire, and his wife Mary Pare, daughter of John Pare of Poston, Herefordshire.

== Career ==
He practised medicine in Kent and was admitted on 11 February 1660 as an Extra Licentiate of the College of Physicians, London. He was created M.D. at the University of Cambridge on 5 March 1669. He became Chymical Physician to Charles II on 19 June 1670, and was created a baronet of Eltham (a mistake for Elham, near Canterbury) on 12 November 1674. In 1675, he was elected Member of Parliament for Weobley in a by-election to the Cavalier Parliament until he was unseated in 1678.

== Personal life ==
Williams married twice. His first marriage, which took place before 1653, was to Anne Hogbeane, daughter of John Hogbeane, barrister of Elham, Kent. This union produced two children:

- Sir John Williams (1653–1723), eldest son and heir
- Sir Edward Williams (1659–1721), MP for Breconshire

Anne died and was buried at Elham on 18 February 1664. He married secondly by licence dated 21 December 1666 Grace Carwardine, widow of Madley, Herefordshire and daughter of Thomas Lewis, of the Moor, Herefordshire. The couple had two further children:

- James Williams (d. 1727), Prebendary of St. Paul's
- Thomas Williams (d. c. 1700)

Sir Thomas died at the age of about 90 and was buried on 12 September 1712, at Glasbury, Breconshire.

Parliament of England
Preceded by Thomas Tomkyns; John Barneby	Member of Parliament for Weobley; 1675–1678; With: John Barneby	Succeeded by William Gregory; John Barneby
Baronetage of England
New creation	Baronet (of Eltham); 1674–1712	Succeeded by Sir John Williams
