= Sir John Williams, 2nd Baronet, of Eltham =

English politician

Sir John Williams, 2nd Baronet, of Elham (24 November 1653 (baptised) – 28 April 1723), was an English politician, of Welsh parentage, who sat in the House of Commons from 1701 to 1705.

Williams was the son of Sir Thomas Williams, 1st Baronet, who was the royal physician to King Charles II. Williams was baptised in Elham in 1653. He was educated in Canterbury and at Peterhouse, Cambridge, where he matriculated in 1670. He was knighted around 1675. He was MP for Herefordshire from 1701 to 1705. He succeeded his father as baronet in 1712.

Williams married Mary Powell (1663–1704), daughter of Sir William Powell on 11 February 1675. The couple had two sons and six daughters, but only three of the daughters survived their parents.

Parliament of England
Preceded by Henry Cornewall; Henry Gorges	Member of Parliament for Herefordshire; 1701–1705; With: Henry Gorges	Succeeded by The Viscount Scudamore; Henry Gorges
Baronetage of England
Preceded by Thomas Williams	Baronet; 1712–1723	Succeeded by David Williams
