= Frances Stewart, Marchioness of Londonderry =

English aristocrat (1751–1833)

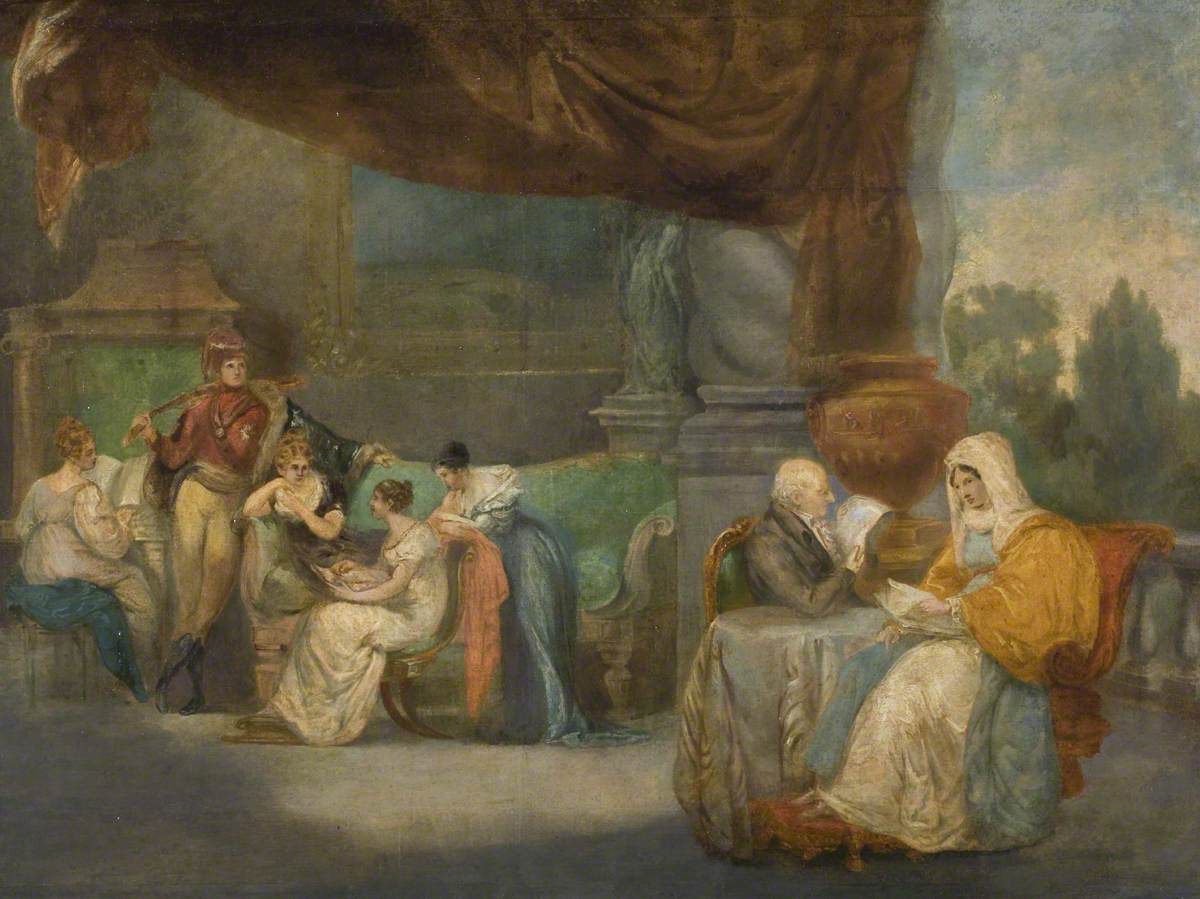
- Marquess of Londonderry with her family in A Conversation Piece by Thomas Romney Robinson
- Born: Frances Pratt; 15 April 1751
- Died: 18 January 1833 (aged 81)
- Occupations: Aristocratic hostess, political confidante
- Spouse: Robert Stewart, 1st Marquess of Londonderry (m. 1775; died 1821)
- Children: 11

Frances Stewart, Marchioness of Londonderry (née Pratt; 15 April 1751 – 18 January 1833), was an English aristocrat and mistress of a large landed and politically connected household in late Georgian Ireland. From her husband's estate at Mount Stewart, County Down, in the 1790s her circle of friends and acquaintances extended to figures engaged in the democratic politics of the United Irishmen. Correspondence with her stepson, Robert Stewart, Viscount Castlereagh (British Foreign Secretary at the Congress of Vienna), and with the English peer and politician John Petty, record major political and social developments of her era.

== Whig family and Irish marriage ==
The future Lady Londonderry was born in England circa 1751, the daughter of Charles Pratt and Elizabeth Jeffreys. Her father (later 1st Earl Camden) was a lawyer with an established interest in constitutional law and civil liberties, and a Whig politician with a popular reputation. In 1770, King George III had demanded and secured his dismissal as Lord High Chancellor of Great Britain for his openly expressed sympathies with John Wilkes and the American colonists.

As a young woman, his daughter reportedly moved in her own dissident and enlightened circle: "that strange masonic band known as 'society.'" In 1775, she married the widowed Robert Stewart, Earl (1796), and later Marquess (1816), of Londonderry. Stewart was one of the principal landowners in County Down but, as a Presbyterian within Ireland's otherwise Anglican Ascendancy, he was popularly identified with the cause of reform. It was a reputation he burnished both as a member of the Irish House of Commons in Dublin (1769–1776), and during the American War of Independence as an officer in the Irish Volunteer movement.

A few years after her marriage Lady Frances was a subject of wild rumour. During a visit to one of her father's estates, she is supposed to have been robbed in the park and to have come home "quite naked." Many things were said at the time, including intimations of madness. After this incident she appeared to retire into "the bosom of her family", yet her correspondence reveals a continuing and lively interest in education and in public affairs.

Her county neighbors deeply admired this quality, especially as she served as the focal point within a network of politically active women. Among them was Elizabeth Rawdon, the dowager Countess of Moira, who, much like Lady Frances's father, had openly voice her sympathy for the American cause.

== 'Republican countess' ==
There is evidence that, in time, stronger Whig convictions and more liberal interests placed Lady Frances privately at odds with her husband, as well as with her brother, John Pratt, 1st Marquess Camden. During the United Irish risings in the early summer of 1798 Camden was Lord Lieutenant of Ireland and was served, as Chief Secretary, by Lady Frances's stepson, Robert Stewart, Viscount Castlereagh.

She was a friend of Jane Greg, reputedly "the head of the [United Irish] Female Societies" in Belfast, and in the view of General Lake responsible for "very great mischief" in that disaffected town. Such was the content of Lady Frances's letters to his sister that Samuel Greg, a cotton merchant in Manchester, was anxious lest their discovery bring suspicion upon him, as "the only Irish gentleman in the town". In one of these she appears to reflect on the precariousness of her position. The sister and step-mother of the Crown's principal officers in Ireland, Lady Frances writes to her militant friend "not to be surprised" if she hears that "a certain republican countess" (a title that, without firm democratic conviction, might have been shared with Margaret King and other women in Lady Moira's aristocratic circle) has been denounced.

In September 1797. Lady Frances tried to intercede with her brother for the life of William Orr, who was condemned for administering the United Irish test to two soldiers. For the United Irishwomen Mary Ann McCracken the gesture was proof that Lady Frances was "equal in firmness and energy of character to her husband".

== 1798, the execution of James Porter ==
After the northern rebellion in June 1798, during which Mount Stewart was briefly occupied, Lady Frances sought reprieve for James Porter. Porter, the local Presbyterian minister, had been close to the Stewarts: once a frequent visitor to the house, he had entertained Lady Frances and her daughters with his lectures on natural and experimental philosophy. In 1790, when Castlereagh was still reputedly a Presbyterian and friend of reform, Porter had been his election agent. With her young sister, Lady Elizabeth (then dying of tuberculosis), she was overwhelmed by Porter's wife and their seven children when they appeared at the house pleading for his life. One of Porter's sons was later to recount that when Londonderry discovered his wife composing a letter to General Nugent, he insisted she add a postscript: "L does not allow me to interfere in Mr Porter's case. I cannot, therefore, and beg not to be mentioned. I only send the letter to gratify the humour", and that with a smile that filed his mother with "much horror", Londonderry then handed her the letter.

Londonderry was content that other offenders—among them David Bailie Warden who commanded north Down rebels in the field, and the Reverend Thomas Ledlie Birch who had urged them on to "drive the bloodhounds of King George the German king beyond the seas"—should be allowed American exile. But James Porter, convicted on uncertain evidence of having helped insurgents "relieve" a post-rider of "a vital military despatch", he was to see hang in front of his own church at Greyabbey. Porter's offence may have been to have lampooned Londonderry in his popular satire of the landed interest, Billy Bluff. (The master of Mount Stewart is recognisable as the inarticulate tyrant "Lord Mountmumble"). But It is also possible that Londonderry, aware that his wife had continued to send for Porter's offending paper, the Northern Star, and had corresponded with Greg, believed the minister to have been an original source of her wayward, and potentially compromising, political sympathies. (He might also have had cause to suspect an earlier tutor to the family, Arthur McMahon, who became a United Irish colonel in Antrim).

== Later years ==
Lady Frances was a friend of John Petty, Earl Wycombe, son of the former British Prime Minister Lord Shelbourne in whose ministry her father had served. A disaffected Whig MP, from 1797 he had repaired to his father's estates in Ireland where his political associations were such that Dublin Castle threatened to arrest him if he did not leave the country. In 1803, he is reported to have visited the rebel arms depot in Thomas Street, Dublin, shortly before Robert Emmet's abortive rising in July.

Petty's correspondence with Lady Frances, which he maintained until his death in 1809, reveals that she continued to entertain criticism of government policy in Ireland, including the Act of Union that her step son helped push though the Irish Parliament in 1800; of the Anglican church establishment and the tithes it levied atop rack rents; of “British tyranny in navigation”, and of religion ("a bad substitute for common sense").

While continuing to take a keen interest in political affairs and corresponding regularly with Castlereagh throughout his war-time service as War, and subsequently as Foreign, Secretary, Lady Frances also immersed herself in local projects. In 1809 she was engaged with the building of a primary school near Mount Stewart for 200 children.

After her husband's death in 1821 Lady Frances returned to England. She died in Hastings, Sussex, on 18 January 1833. She was preceded in death by six of her eleven children.

== Children ==
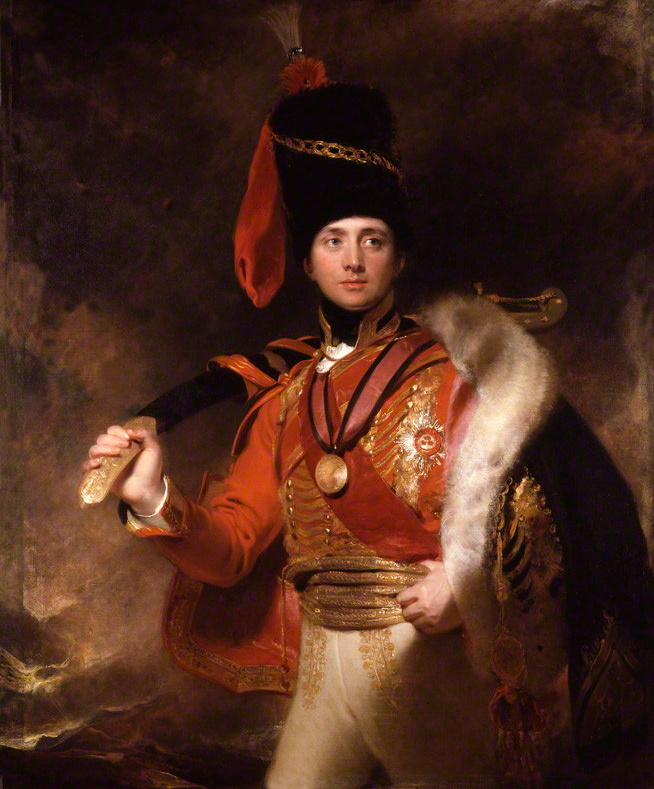
Portrait of Sir Charles Stewart by Thomas Lawrence, 1812

She had eleven children with Lord Londonderry, three sons and eight daughters:

1. Charles William (1778–1854), succeeded his father as 3rd Marquess
2. Frances Ann (1777–1810), married Lord Charles Fitzroy
3. Elizabeth Mary (1779–1798)
4. Caroline (1781–1860), married Col. Thomas Wood MP
5. Alexander John (1783–1800)
6. Georgiana (1785–1804), married the politician George Canning, 1st Baron Garvagh.
7. Selina Sarah Juliana (1786–1871), married David Guardi Ker MP for Downpatrick
8. Matilda Charlotte (1787–1842), married Edward Michael Ward.
9. Emily Jane (1789–1865), married Henry Hardinge, 1st Viscount Hardinge
10. Thomas Henry (1790–1810)
11. Octavia (1792–1819), married Edward Law, 1st Earl of Ellenborough
