= Gwernyfed =

Coordinates: 52.0246°N 3.178°W

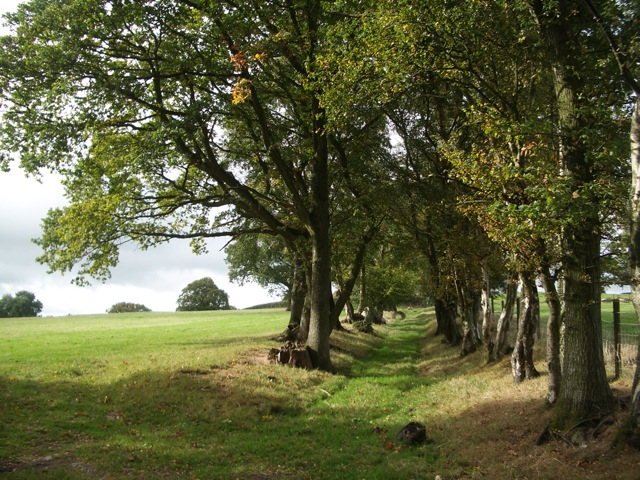
- Maestorglwyd: tree-lined track
- Population: 1,049
- Community: Gwernyfed
- Principal area: Powys
- Preserved county: Powys
- Country: Wales
- Sovereign state: United Kingdom
- Post town: BRECON
- Postcode district: LD3
- Post town: HEREFORD
- Postcode district: HR3
- Dialling code: 01497
- Police: Dyfed-Powys
- Fire: Mid and West Wales
- Ambulance: Welsh
- UK Parliament: Brecon, Radnor and Cwm Tawe
- Senedd Cymru – Welsh Parliament: Brecon & Radnorshire
- List of places UK Wales Powys Map of the community

Gwernyfed is a community in Powys, Wales, centred on the village of Three Cocks (Welsh: Aberllynfi). It takes its name from Gwernyfed Park, a medieval deer park within the community.

The community of Gwernyfed was established in 1985 through the merger of the former Aberllynfi community, the greater part of the former Tre-goed & Felindre community, and small parts of the Bronllys and former Llanelieu communities. It includes the villages of Three Cocks and Felindre, the Brecknockshire half of the village of Glasbury, and the rural settlements of Tre-goed (Tregoyd) and Pont Ithel. The population in 2011 was 1049, represented by 10 councillors in a single ward.

== See also ==
- Gwernyfed High School
