= Robert de Ros (died 1285) =

English nobleman, died 1285

Sir Robert de Ros (before 1237 – 13 May 1285) was an English nobleman.

== Family ==
Robert de Ros of Helmsley, Yorkshire, born c. 1225, was the son of Sir William de Ros (died c. 1264/5) and Lucy FitzPeter, the daughter of Peter FitzHerbert and Alice FitzRoger. He had five brothers, Sir Peter, Sir William, Sir Alexander, Sir Herbert, and John, and two sisters, Lucy and Alice.

He was the grandson of Sir Robert de Ros, one of the twenty-five barons who guaranteed the observance of Magna Carta, and Isabel of Scotland, an illegitimate daughter of William the Lion, King of the Scots, by Isabel, a daughter of Robert Avenel.

== Career ==
On 24 December 1264 he was summoned to Simon de Montfort's Parliament in London as Robert de Ros, and for some time it was considered that the barony was created by writ in that year, and that Robert de Ros was the 1st Baron Ros. According to The Complete Peerage:

In 1616 the barony of De Ros was allowed precedence from this writ [of 24 December 1264], a decision adopted by the Lords in 1806 (Round, Peerage and Pedigree, vol. i, pp. 249-50); but these writs, issued by Simon in the King's name, are no longer regarded as valid for the creation of peerages.

Accordingly, the barony is now considered to have been created when Robert's eldest son, William de Ros was summoned to Parliament from 6 February 1299 to 16 October 1315 by writs directed Willelmo de Ros de Hamelak.

On 3 July 1257, Ros obtained from Henry III a grant of the free warren, in the lordship of Belvoir, by which the boundary was determined. In 1258, he was actively employed in Scotland, in delivering King Alexander III of Scotland out of the hands of his rebellious subjects; and at Chester, in resisting the hostile invasions of Llewelyn the Last. In the same year, he and his lady Isabel had a controversy with the Prior and Convent of Belvoir, relative to the right of presentation to the Church of Redmile (near Bottesford), which was amicably compromised by their relinquishing the patronage to the convent, for a certain compensation. In 1261 he obtained from the king the grant of a weekly market, to be held at Belvoir, on Tuesday; and of an annual fair on the feast of St John the Baptist, to continue for three days. In 1264, he was one of the insurgent barons who defeated Henry III at the battle of Lewes, and took him and the prince prisoner, confining them in Farleigh Hungerford Castle. In 1264, de Ros was summoned to the parliament, which was called by the barons in the king's name. He died in 1285, and was buried at Kirkham Priory.

== Marriage and issue ==
Robert de Ros married, Bef. 17 May 1246, Isabel d'Aubigny (c.1233 – 15 June 1301), granddaughter (her father, William, died in 1247) and heiress of William d'Aubigny (died 1236) of Belvoir, Leicestershire, by his second wife, Isabel, by whom he had five sons and three daughters:

- William de Ros, 1st Baron de Ros.
- Sir Robert de Ros of Gedney, Lincolnshire, who married a wife named Erneburge.
- John de Ros.
- Nicholas de Ros, a cleric.
- Peter de Ros, a cleric.
- Isabel de Ros, who married Walter de Fauconberg, 2nd Baron Fauconberg.
- Joan de Ros, who married John Lovell, 1st Baron Lovell.
- Mary de Ros, who married William de Braose, 1st Baron Braose.
- Emlin de Roos, married to William de Thany.
