= Afon Llynfi =

Afon Llynfi may refer to:

- Afon Llynfi (Wye), the tributary of the River Wye at Llangors
- River Llynfi, the tributary of the Ogmore River near Maesteg
