= Castell Dinas =

Castle in Powys, Wales

Coordinates: 51.96355°N 3.196527°W

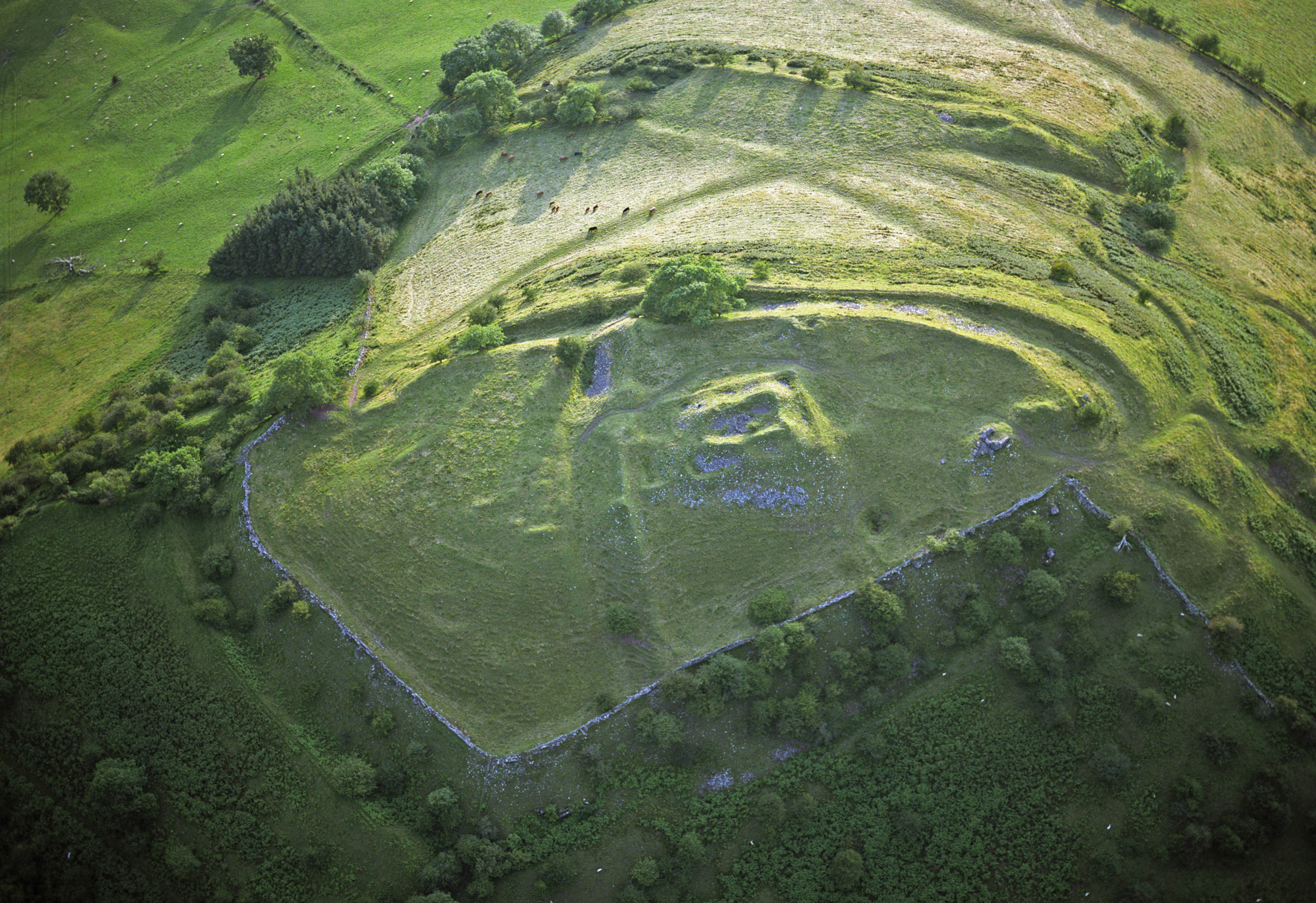
Aerial View of Castell Dinas

Castell Dinas is a hillfort and castle in southern Powys, Wales. At 450 m (1,476 feet) (SO179301) it has the highest castle in England and Wales. It is positioned to defend the Rhiangoll pass between Talgarth and Crickhowell.

== Iron Age hillfort and Norman castle ==
This site was originally an Iron Age, 600 BC to 50 AD, hillfort. A fortified Norman castle with stone walls was built on the site possibly by William Fitz Osbern or his son Roger de Breteuil, Earl of Hereford in the period 1070 to 1075. The castle was eclipsed with the building of Brecon castle before April 1093. The fortress seems to have been constructed in stone from the first with a hall-keep surrounded with curtain walls and square towers. Historically the castle remained a part of Brecon or Brycheiniog barony until 1207 when King John of England granted it to Peter FitzHerbert. It then became caput of what was to become the Talgarth or Blaenllyfni barony.

The castle was sacked by Prince Llywelyn ab Iorwerth in October 1233 and subsequently refortified by King Henry III of England before being returned to Peter Fitz Herbert. The castle was again captured by Llywelyn's grandson, Prince Llywelyn ap Gruffudd in the period 1263 to 1268. The castle was finally destroyed by the adherents of Owain Glyndŵr in the early 15th century rebellion.

What remains now are crumbling walls mainly covered with earth and the outlines of ditches and ramparts from the original Iron Age fortifications, commanding extensive views up into the Black Mountains and over Talgarth towards Brecon. Part of the 2m thick eastern wall of the bailey survives as a modern boundary wall. The only extant building is section of a gatehouse next to a postern gate at the northern end of the outer ward.

== See also ==
- List of hillforts in Wales
- List of castles in Wales
