= Llanelieu =

Coordinates: 52.0001°N 3.1873°W

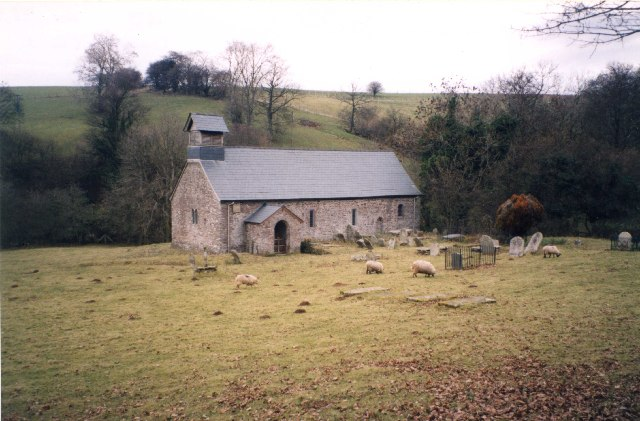
- St Ellyw's Church

- Location within Powys
- Principal area: Powys
- Preserved county: Powys
- Country: Wales
- Sovereign state: United Kingdom
- Post town: BRECON
- Postcode district: LD3
- Dialling code: 01874
- Police: Dyfed-Powys
- Fire: Mid and West Wales
- Ambulance: Welsh
- UK Parliament: Brecon, Radnor and Cwm Tawe
- Senedd Cymru – Welsh Parliament: Brecon & Radnorshire

Llanelieu (English Llaneleu) is a small settlement and former civil parish (community) in Powys, Wales on the northern edge of the Black Mountains within the Brecon Beacons National Park. It lies within the historic bounds of Brecknockshire. The settlement is now part of the community of Talgarth. The nearest town is Talgarth some 2.5 miles (4.0 km) to the west.

== The settlement ==
Prehistoric settlement of the area is evidenced by Ffostyll Long Cairns, two neolithic burial chambers just to the north of Ffostyll Farm.

=== St Ellyw's Church ===
St Ellyw's Church is the main feature of the scattered settlement as well as being the source of its name (Llan-Ellyw). Saint Ellyw is said to have been one of the many saintly offspring of Brychan, legendary 5th-century king of Brycheiniog who ruled from nearby Talgarth. The church of St Ellyw dates from the 13th century and, unusually, escaped Victorian modernization so that it preserves many of its medieval features. It is now redundant, but is cared for as a Grade I listed building.

Near the church is a veteran yew that was believed to have been used as the parish stocks in the 17th and 18th centuries. Natural holes in the tree took the miscreant's arms which were then secured by an iron bar. The tree was subject to restoration in 2010.

=== Llanelieu Court ===
In 1845, Samuel Lewis' topographical entry for Llanelieu noted that "there were formerly several ancient mansions, but they have been all abandoned as family residences by their proprietors, and are at present occupied as farm-houses". Chief among those that survive is Llanelieu Court, a 17th-century house which was formerly the home of one of the branches of the Aubrey family. In recent years it has housed a craft pottery, the Black Mountains Pottery, and is now a Grade II listed building.

== The parish and community ==
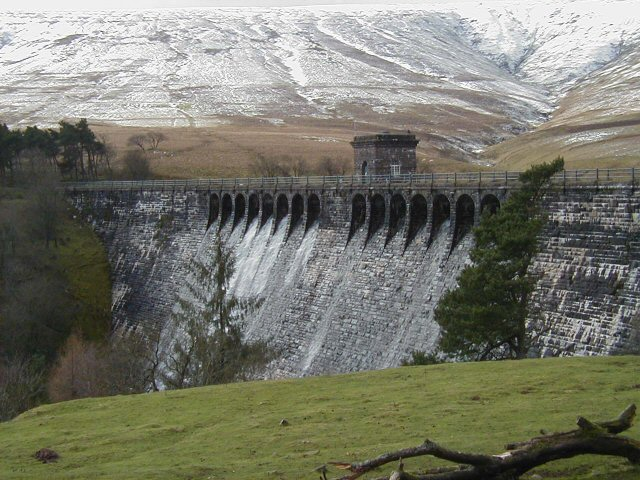
Grwyne Fawr Reservoir Dam

Llanelieu was a civil parish from 1837 until 1974, when it was re-termed a community. The community included the settlement of Llanelieu and extended to the south east as far as Mynydd Du Forest. As such, it included a substantial upland area of the Black Mountains, principally along the valley of the Grwyne Fawr where a reservoir was completed between 1908 and 1928. A temporary village, including school, was built on site to house construction workers and remains of this village are still visible. Lewis in 1845 described the "surrounding scenery as bold, and in some parts romantic", whereas the 1868 National Gazetteer dismissed it as "somewhat of a gloomy cast".

Despite its size, Llanelieu was one of the least populous communities in Brecknockshire containing just 15 houses and 72 people in 1961. In 1985, it was split up, the settlement merging with the community of Talgarth, whilst the northernmost part was transferred to the new community of Gwernyfed and the extensive southern part to the new community of the Vale of Grwyney.
