= St Ellyw's Church, Llanelieu =

Redundant church in Powys, Wales

Coordinates: 52.0000°N 3.1887°W

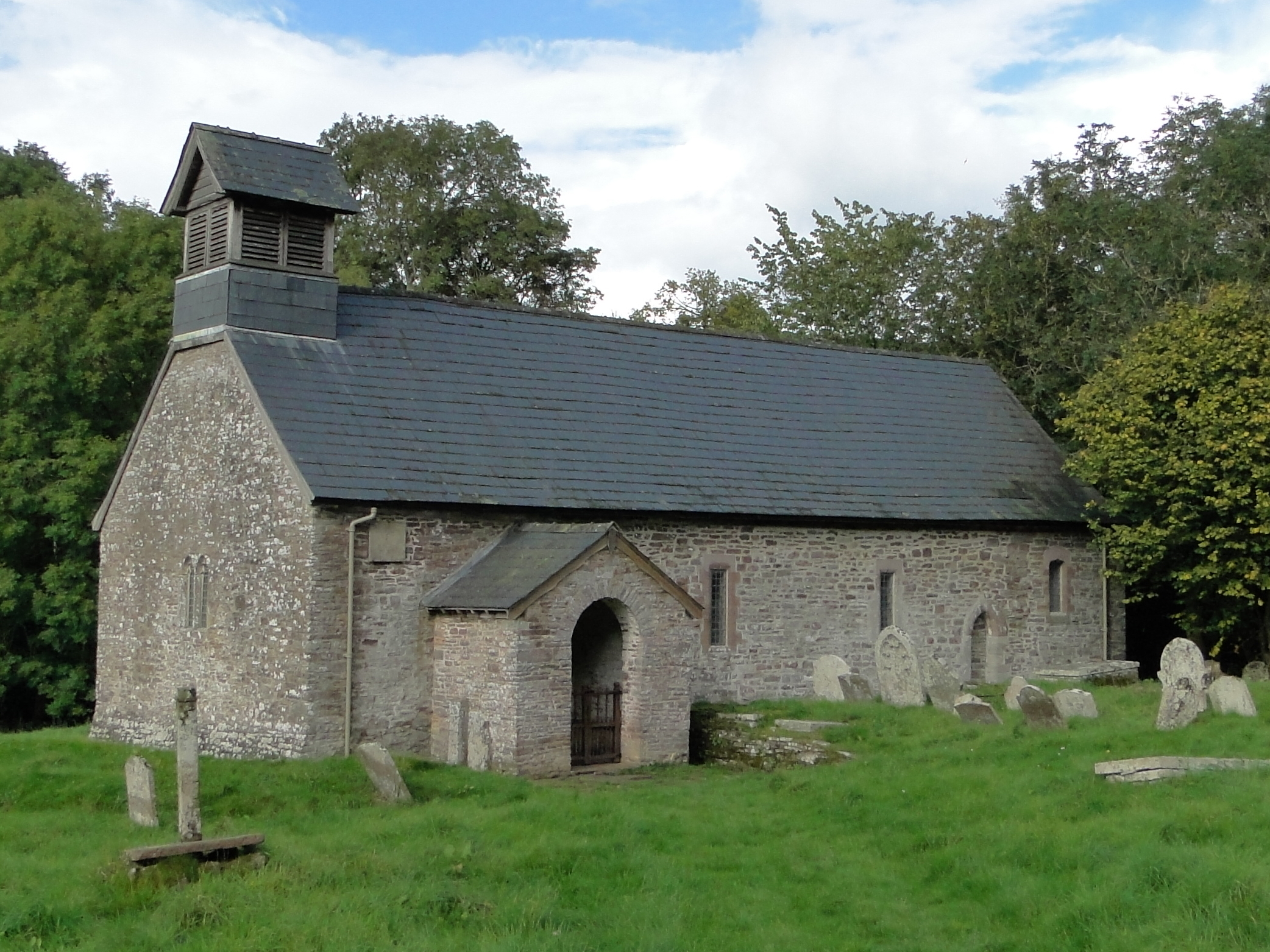
- St Ellyw's Church, Llanelieu

- Location in Powys
- OS grid reference: SO 184 341
- Location: Llanelieu, Powys
- Country: Wales
- Denomination: Church in Wales
- Website: Friends of Friendless Churches

History
- Dedication: Saint Ellyw

Architecture
- Functional status: Redundant
- Heritage designation: Grade I
- Designated: 28 September 1961
- Architect: Baldwins of Brecon (restoration)
- Architectural type: Church
- Groundbreaking: 13th century
- Completed: 1905

Specifications
- Materials: Sandstone rubble, slate roof

St Ellyw's Church, is a redundant church in the village of Llanelieu, Powys, Wales. It is designated by Cadw as a Grade I listed building, and is under the care of the Friends of Friendless Churches. It is sited at the edge of the Black Mountains within the Brecon Beacons National Park.

There is a tradition that Saint Ellyw was a granddaughter of King Brychan, the 5th-century king of Brycheiniog.

== History ==
The church dates from the 13th century with additions in the 15th century. The south porch was built in the 16th century. In 1905 Baldwins of Brecon carried out a restoration, and added a bell turret. Further repairs were undertaken in 1981. The church was acquired by the charity, the Friends of Friendless Churches, in 1999. The charity holds a 999-year lease with effect from 19 November 1999.

== Architecture ==
=== Exterior ===
It is constructed in sandstone rubble and has a slate roof. Its plan consists of a single undivided cell with a south porch and a gabled bell turret at the west end. Immediately to the east of the porch is a blocked medieval door and there is a narrow priest's door dating from the 13th century further to the east. The windows on the north side of the church are lancets while those on the south side, and at the east and west ends, are two-light windows.

=== Interior ===
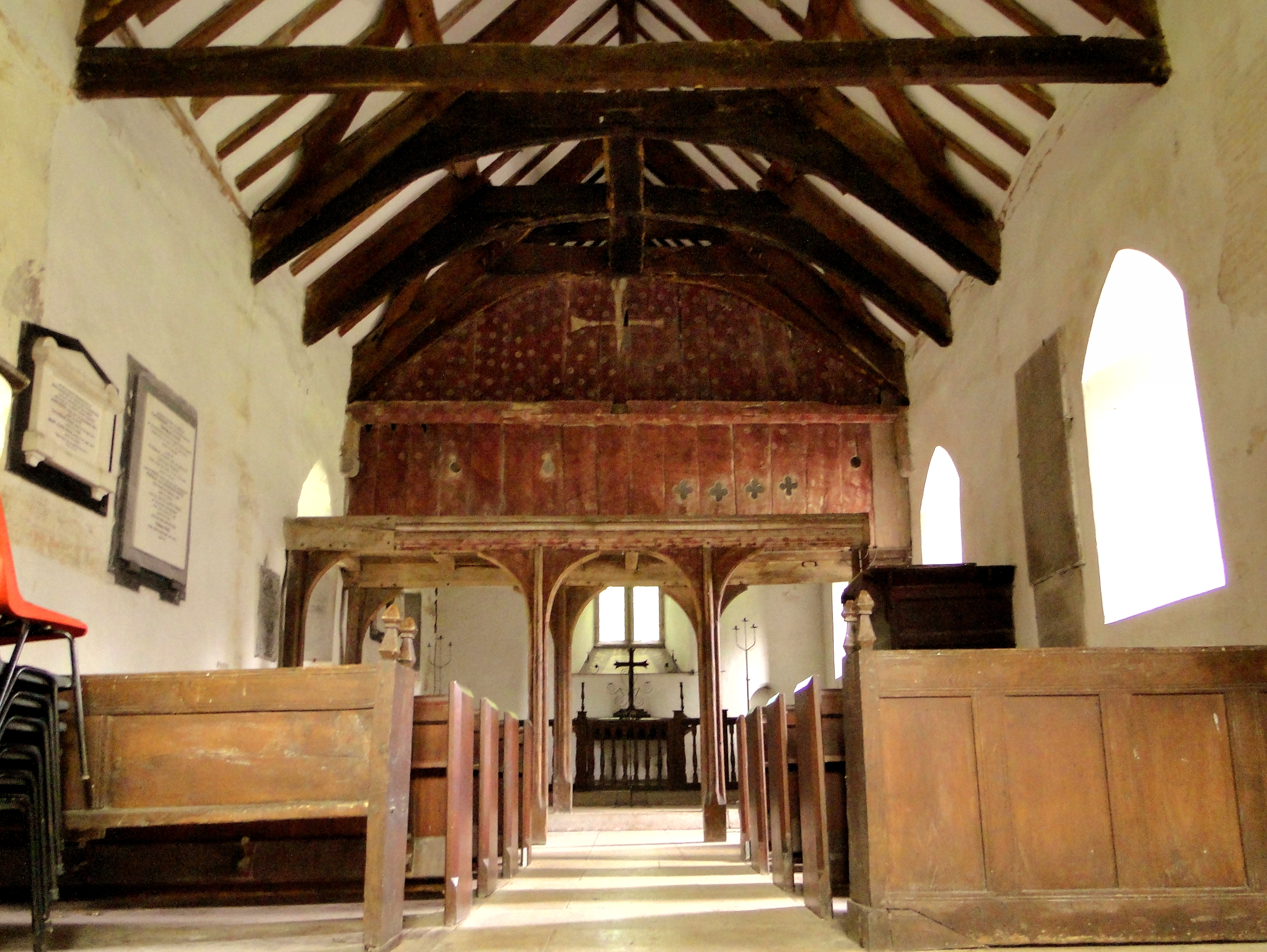
The 14th-century rood screen and loft, viewed down the nave

The floor of the church is stone-flagged, and there is a one-step rise between the nave and the chancel. Between them is a 14th-century rood screen complete with its loft. This is described as being "an exceptional regional example of a medieval rood screen". The loft is painted blood red, and it has quatrefoil openings to allow a view of the altar from it. The plastered walls of the church exhibit a variety of paintings, some from the medieval period, and some from the post-Reformation era. On the west wall are depictions of Adam and Eve standing on each side of a tree, and elsewhere are flower patterns, all probably dating from the medieval period. Later paintings include biblical texts, creeds, the Ten Commandments, royal arms, and figures with drapery. The sanctuary is paved with tomb slabs and contains a double piscina on the east wall and an aumbry in the south wall. The font is octagonal with a 17th-century oak cover. The pulpit dates from the early 18th century. There are two oak pews from the 17th-18th century. On the walls are memorial tablets.

== Assessment and present-day use ==
The Cadw citation states that the church is listed Grade I because it is "an important country church that has retained much of its medieval interior, including wall paintings and an exceptional rood screen". The church is used by local people for concerts and meetings, and it is a venue for the annual Talgarth Festival.
