= Brecknock Wildlife Trust =

Former Welsh wildlife trust

Brecknock Wildlife Trust (Welsh: Ymddiriedolaeth Natur Sir Frycheiniog) is a former wildlife trust covering the vice county of Brecknockshire in Wales. The Trust was founded in 1964, with a network of volunteers carrying out most of its work. No full-time conservation officers were in post until 1987. Heritage Lottery funding helped the Trust to expand, and a bequest of £1,000,000 in 2003 resulted in the appointment of a Reserves Officer. In April 2018, it merged with The Wildlife Trust of South and West Wales.

The offices of the Trust are located in Lion House, Brecon. The Trust has 22 reserves, the majority of which are in the Brecon Beacons National Park. All are open to the public free of charge.

The most visited of the reserves is at Pwll-y-Wrach ("Witches' Pool", near Talgarth; the site is 17.5 hectares in area, most of which is woodland. At the eastern end of the reserve is a waterfall flowing from the River Enig into the so-called Witches' Pool. The wildlife in this area includes bluebells, woodruff, orchids, herb paris, toothwort, dormice and dippers (which frequent the waterfall).

Another reserve run by the Trust, Glasbury Cutting, is located at Glasbury-on-Wye, in the far east of the Trust's administrative area. Formerly part of the railway line between Brecon and Hereford, which closed in 1962, it is composed partly of woodland and partly of a meadow created to encourage wild plants. Dormice, a protected species, were discovered within the reserve in 2000. In the far south-west, Cae Lynden Nature Reserve is one of three reserves close together near Ystradgynlais. The grasslands of this former sports field encourage marsh fritillary, meadow brown, and gatekeeper butterflies.

Vicarage Meadows, a grassland reserve near Abergwesyn in the Irfon Valley, is managed by the Trust and the species growing there include bog asphodel, wood bitter vetch, greater butterfly orchids, and small white orchids.

In March 2016, the Brecknock Wildlife Trust announced a new initiative in the Ystradgynlais area, called the Wild Communities Project. This is intended to capitalise on the results of an earlier project, the “Upper Tawe Valley Living Landscape Project". Lottery funding of £313,757 has been allocated to this project, which will take place over three years.
