= Welsh tower houses =

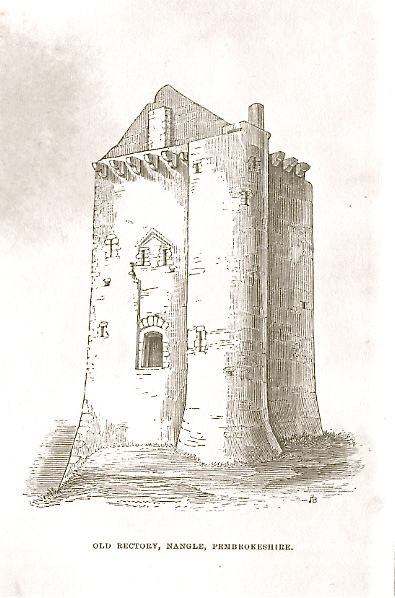
The Old Rectory, Angle, Pembrokeshire

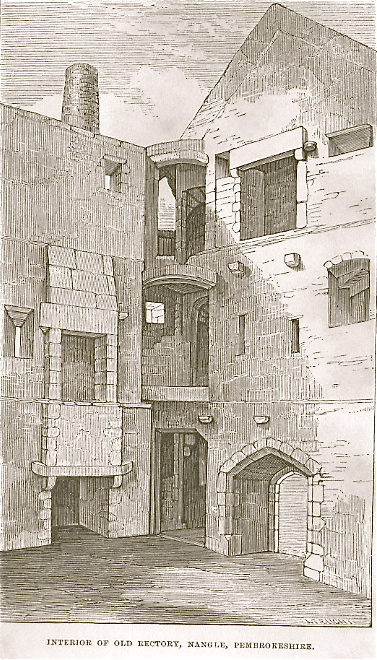
Interior of The Old Rectory, Angle, Pembrokeshire

Welsh tower houses were fortified stone houses that were built between the early 14th and 15th centuries. They are related to tower houses, which occur in considerable numbers in Ireland and Scotland and to a much lesser extent in England. A map showing the distribution of tower houses within the United Kingdom is given in Houses of the Welsh Countryside.

== Distribution of tower houses in Wales ==
The main concentration of tower houses is in southern Pembrokeshire, Wales. These were first published with detailed drawings in 1877–8 by Rev. E L Barnwell. The Pembrokeshire examples have a coastal distribution; this is also true of the Monmouth and Glamorgan tower houses, as well as the demolished examples at Penhryn (in Caernarfonshire) and Ty Gwyn (in Abermo). Otherwise, the tower houses are distributed along the Welsh—English border, with one example, Wattlesborourgh, just over the border in Shropshire. In 1976, Hilling produced a map (with listing) showing seventeen examples. Further houses have been added by Suggett and it is possible that new examples will be recognised as being incorporated into existing buildings, as at Sandyhaven House in Pembrokeshire.

== Dating and features of Welsh tower houses ==
The Welsh tower houses are not particularly large and have up to three storeys above an undercroft, as at the Old Rectory, Angle and the Tower at Talgarth. Smith distinguished a smaller group of house which only have one storey above an undercroft, The best example of this type is Carswell in Pembrokeshire. Smith compared this group to the Irish £10 tower houses. These were built after 1427 when a statute was passed that any of the King’s liege living within The Pale would be paid £10 for building a house of a minimum size. It seems likely that the Welsh houses were built about the same time.”

Taller tower houses, such as the Old Rectory, Angle, are likely to have been built before 1400, as they have arrow slits, rather than an early form of gun port, which would have been used after that date. At Penhryn, Licence to crenellate was granted in 1438. The internal round staircase at the corner at the Old Rectory, Angle is similar to some Irish tower houses and some the Welsh tower house have projecting garderobes similar to the Scottish and Irish tower houses. There is also some evidence that a stone or timber hall would have been built or added to the tower at the same time or shortly after the tower house was built. At Eastington and Bonville Court, the tower which was built against a hall, is rectangular, rather than square. The Old Rectory at Angle clearly shows the evidence for a gable of a hall butting up against the tower.

== List of Welsh tower houses ==
=== Brecknockshire ===
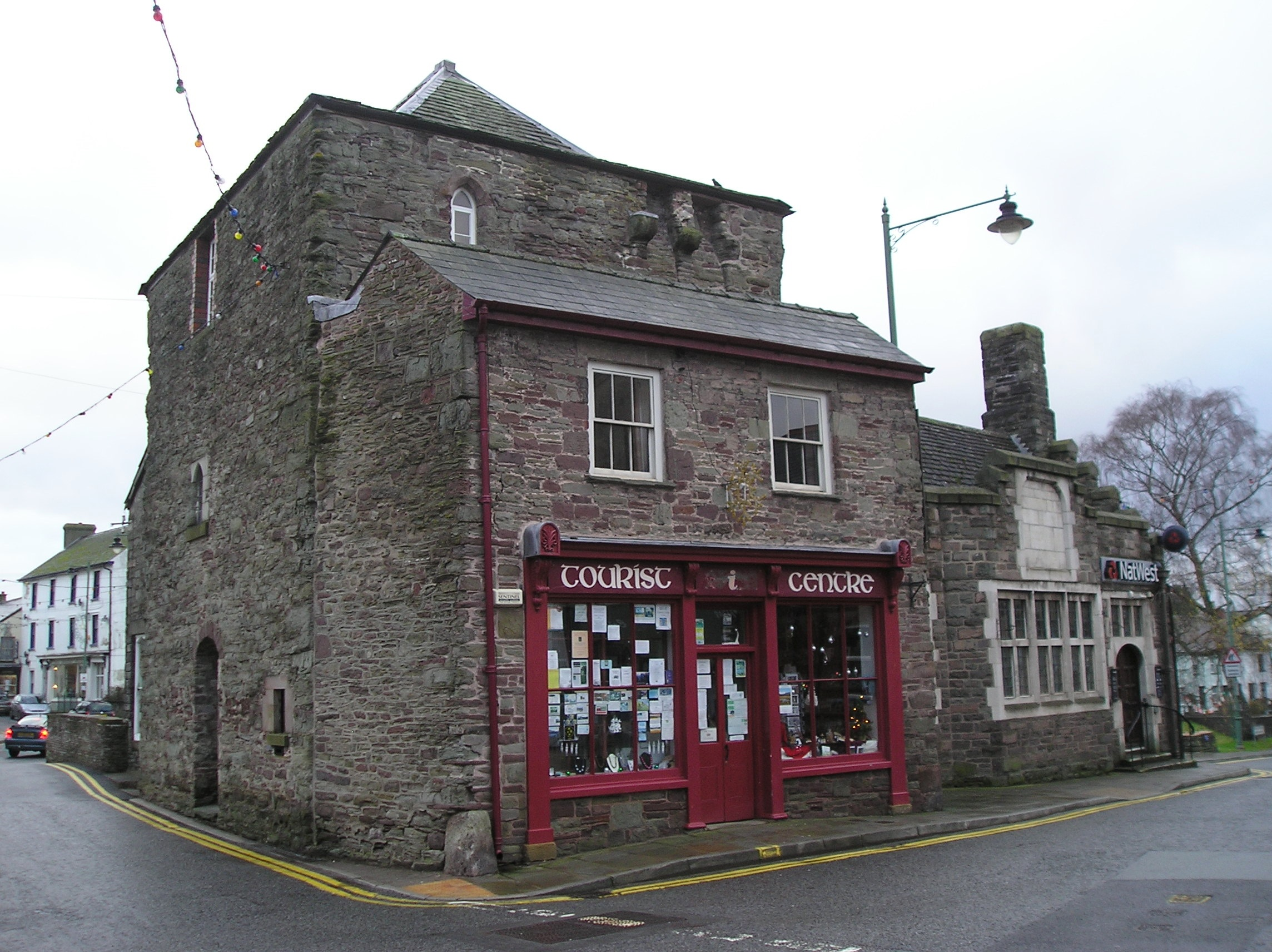
Tower House, Talgarth

- Scethrog Tower.
- The Tower, Talgarth. Three storeys over an undercroft.

=== Denbighshire ===
- Bodidris, Llandegla Possible example.

=== Caernarfonshire ===
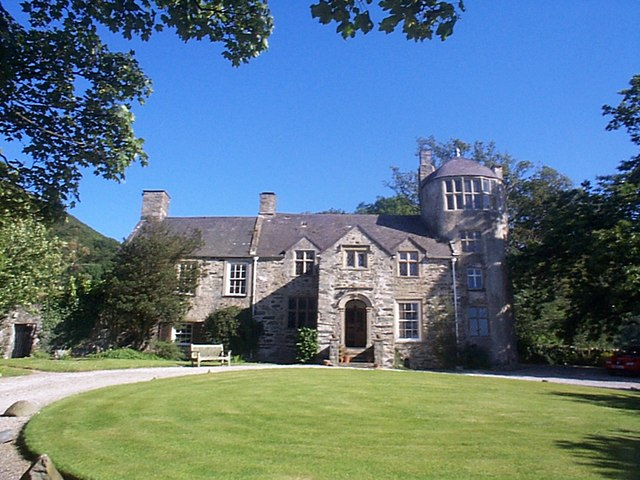
Pen y Bryn Manor

- Penrhyn Castle.Tower demolished, but licence to crenellate granted in 1438
- ?Pen-y-Bryn, Aber. Possibly a Medieval Tower, but much altered in the 16th century.

=== Flintshire ===
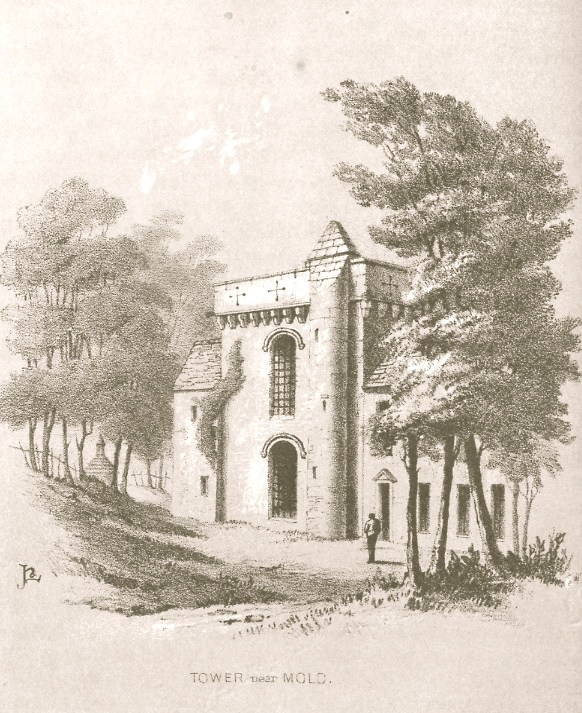
Tower, near Mold 1846

- Tower (Rheinallt ap Gruffydd’s, Tower)., Broncoed, Mold.

=== Glamorgan ===
- Candleston Castle, Bridgend.
- Oxwich Castle
- Weobley Castle, Gower

=== Merionethshire ===
- Ty-gwyn, Abermo. Demolished.

=== Montgomeryshire ===
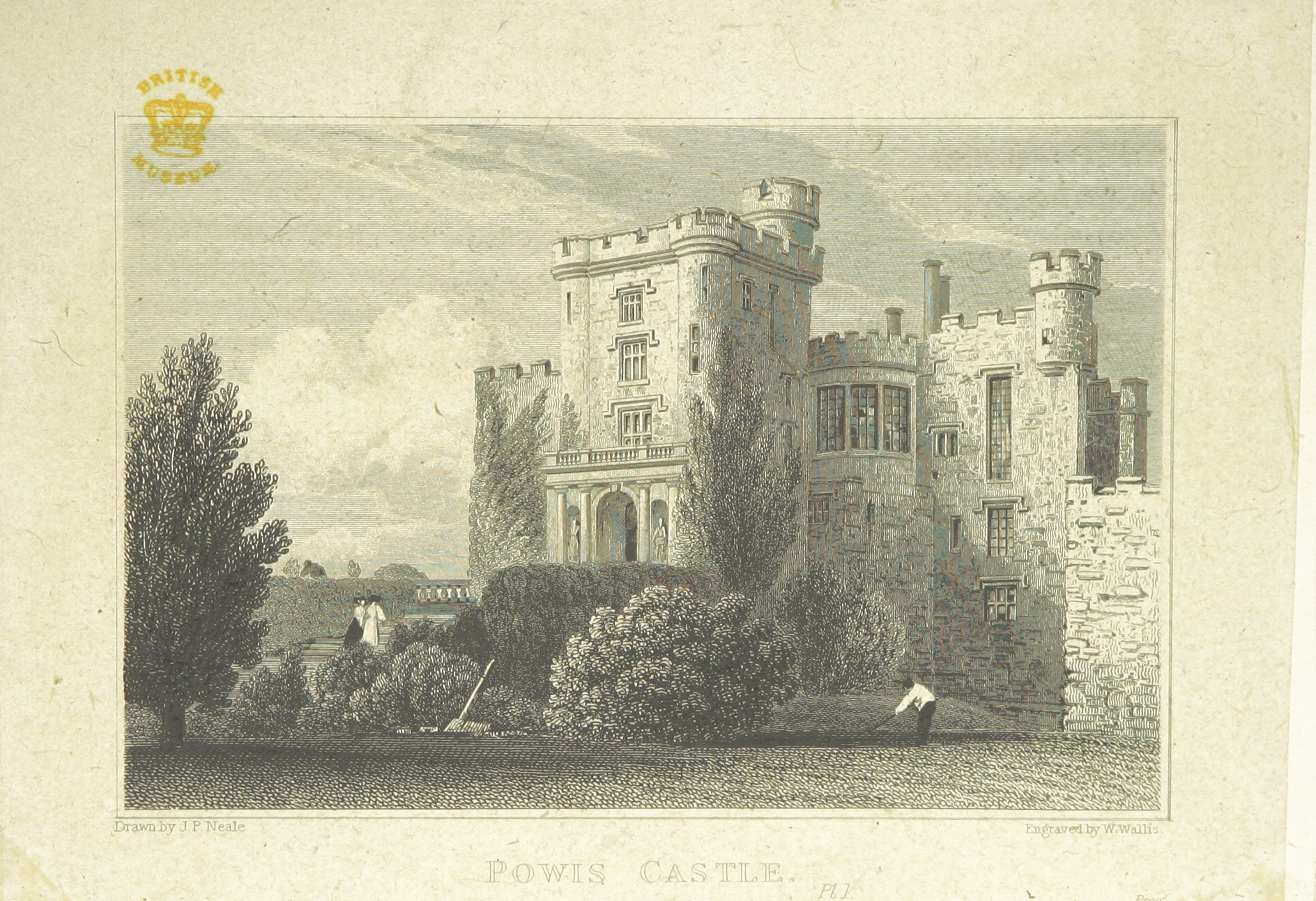
Neale(1829) p5.221 - East Gate, Powis Castle, Montgomeryshire

- Powis Castle. The East Gate appears originally to have been a Tower House, which has had an entrance made through the vaulted undercroft, probably in the 17th century. An extra storey was add to the tower in 1815-1818 when Sir Robert Smirke refenestrated the castle and added Gothic Revival battlements. Without these additions and alterations, the East Gate is very similar to the Tower houses at Tower near Mold and Angle in Pembrokeshire. This is illustrated by J P Neale's print of 1829.

=== Monmouthshire ===
- Kemeys Manor, Newport
- Penhow Castle, Penhow

=== Pembrokeshire ===
- Angle. Old Rectory. Three storeys over a vaulted store room
- Carswell, Penally
- Eastington, Rhoscrowther. Rectangular, rather than square tower, with adjacent halls
- Bonville’s Castle
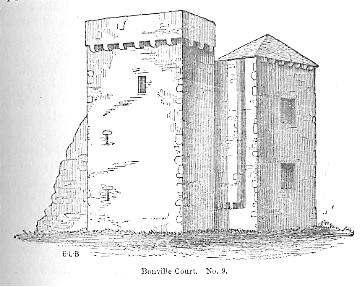
  Bonville Castle, Pembrokeshire
- Priory Farm, Pembroke
- Roch Castle
- West Tarr Farm, St Florence. Two vaulted chambers, one over the other.
- Kingston Farm, St Michaels
- Sandyhaven House, St Ishmael’s. Incorporated into main house.
- Sister’s House, Minwear

=== Welsh Marches ===
- Wattlesborourgh, Alberbury, Shropshire. This Tower House is very close to the Welsh border and would have been considered part of Wales prior to the Acts of Union

== Welsh tower house Gallery ==
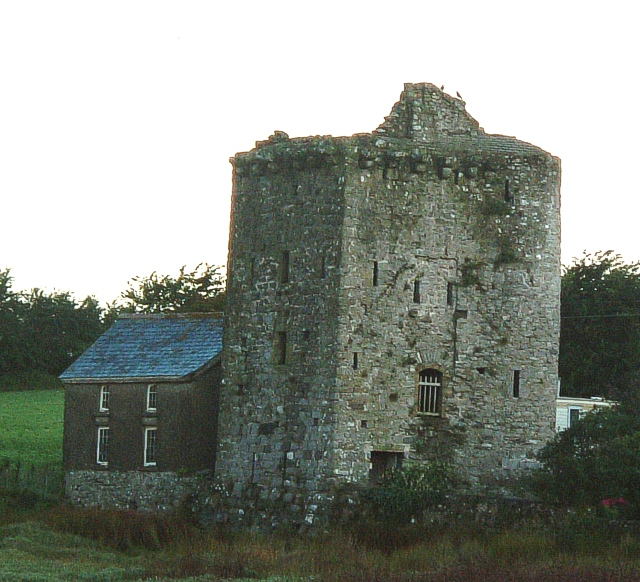
Old Rectory, Angle

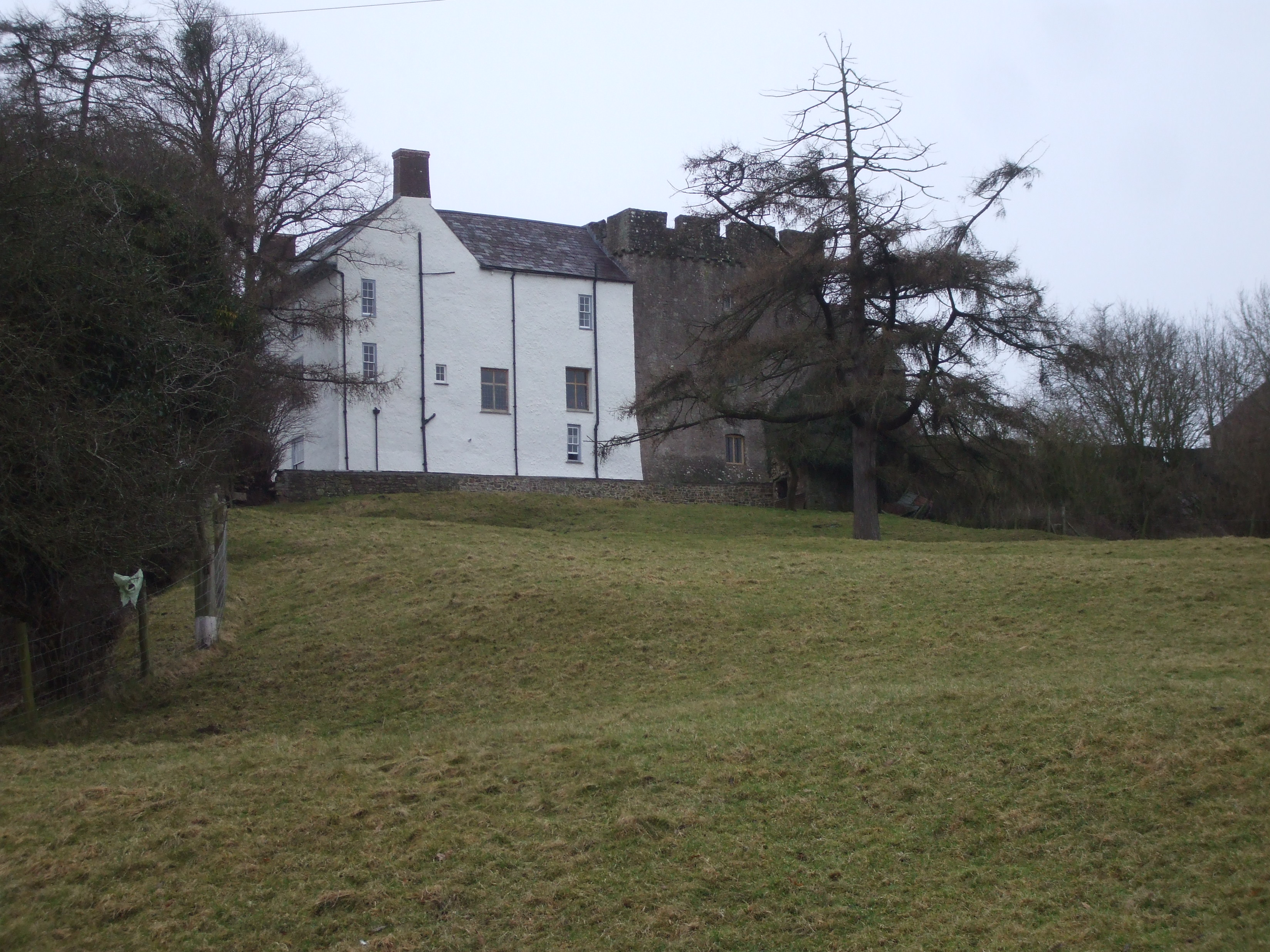
Penhow Castle:Tower house and later house

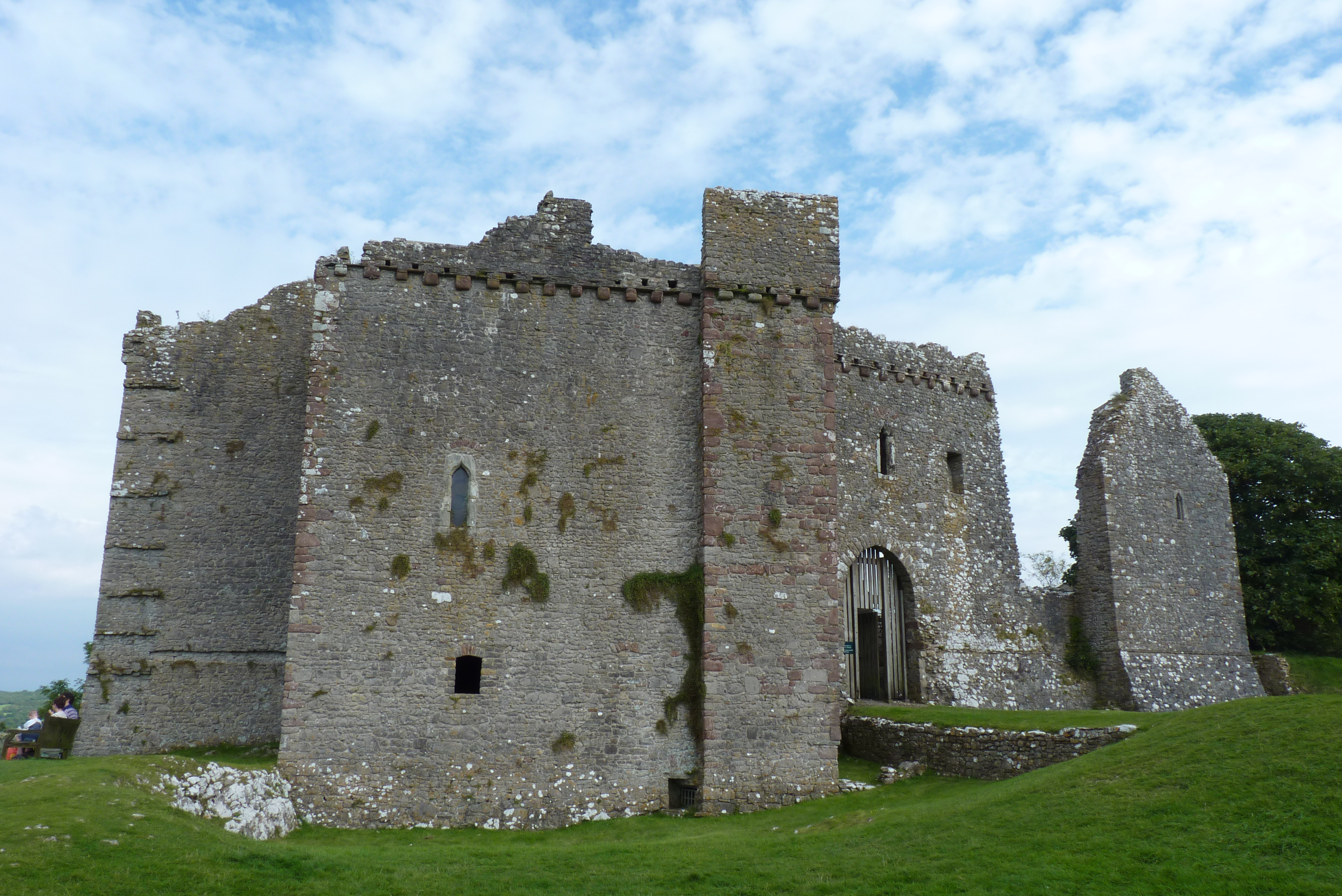
Weobley Castle, Gower

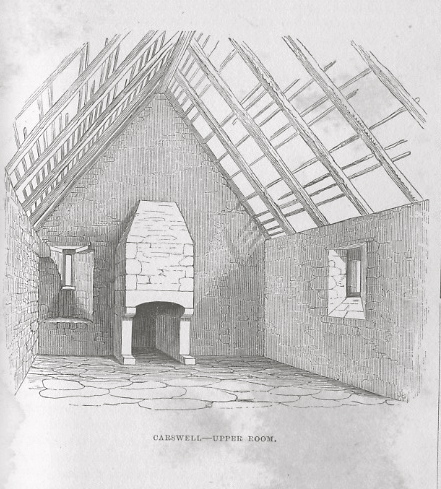
Carswell, Penally. Pembrokeshire. Upper floor

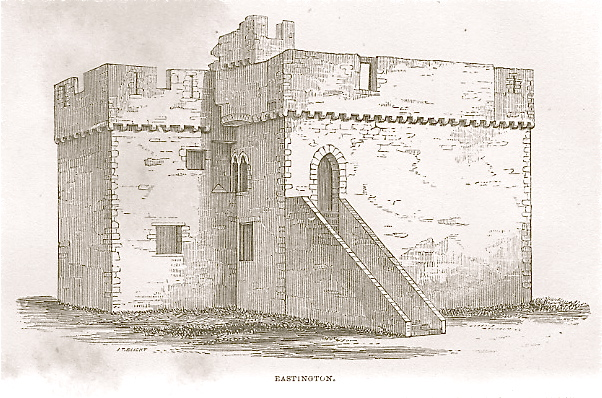
Eastington, Pembrokeshire

== See also ==
- Scottish Vernacular
- Tower houses in Britain and Ireland
- Vernacular architecture

== Bibliography ==
- Barnwell E L Domestic Architecture of South Pembrokeshire, Archaeologia Cambrensis, Vol 13, 1867, 193-204, 363-374 & Vol 14,1868, 70–84.
- Hilling J B., Historic Architecture of Wales: An Introduction Univ. Wales Press, Cardiff, 1976
- Scourfield R and Haslam R The Buildings of Wales: Powys; Montgomeryshire, Radnorshire and Breconshire. Yale University Press 2013
- Smith P Houses of the Welsh Countryside, 2nd Edition, 1988, HMSO/ RCAHMW
- Suggett R and Stevenson G Introducing Houses of the Welsh Countryside. Cyflwyno Cartrefi Cefn Gwlad Cymru. Y Lolfa/ RCAHMW, 2010
