= William de Ros of Helmsley =

13th century English noble

William de Ros, Lord of Helmsley, was an English noble. He was the eldest son of Robert de Ros and Isabella Mac William.

With his father he opposed King John of England, during the First Barons War between 1215 and 1217. Both he and his father were excommunicated during the rebellion. William was captured during the battle of Lincoln on 19 May 1217 and became a prisoner, before paying 20 marks to be released into his fathers care in October 1217.

He was buried in Kirkham Priory, Kirkham, North Yorkshire, England.

== Marriage and issue ==
He married Lucy FitzPeter, the daughter of Peter FitzHerbert and Alice FitzRoger, they are known to have had the following issue:

- Robert de Ros (died 1285), married Isabel d'Aubigny, had issue.
- Peter de Ros
- William de Ros (died about 28 May 1310), married Eustache FitzHugh, had issue.
- Alexander de Ros
- Herbert de Ros
- John de Ros
- Lucy de Ros
- Alice de Ros, married John Comyn of Badenoch, had issue.
