= Robert de Ros (died 1227) =

English baron

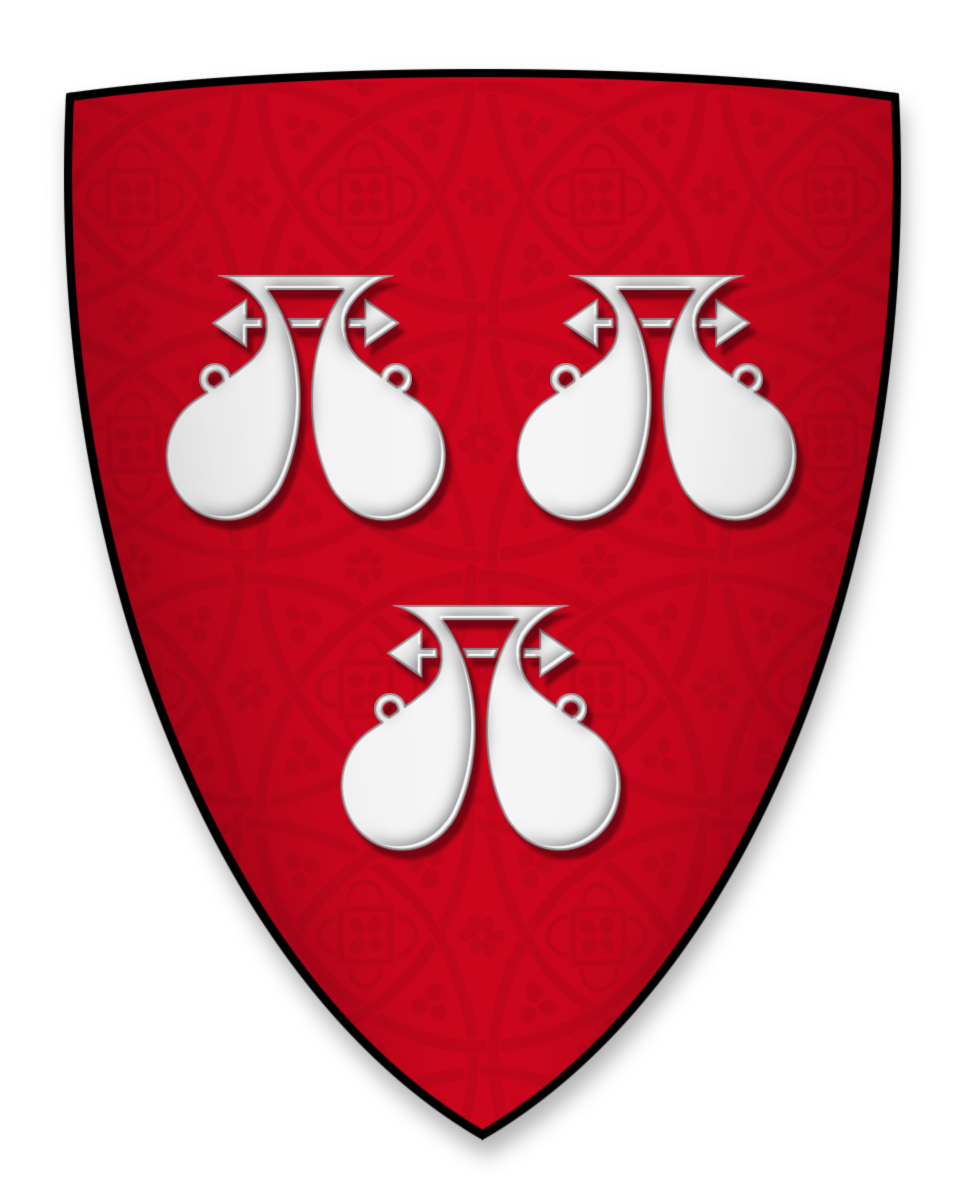
- Arms of Robert de Ros; Blazon: Gules, three water bougets argent.
- Born: c. 1182
- Died: c. 1227 (aged 45)
- Buried: Temple Church, London, England
- Spouse: Isabella
- Issue: William de Ros; Robert de Ros
- Father: Everard de Ros
- Mother: Roese Trussebut

Sir Robert de Ros (c. 1160 – c. 1227) was an Anglo-Norman feudal baron, soldier and administrator who was one of the twenty-five barons appointed under clause 61 of Magna Carta to monitor its observance by King John of England.

== Origins ==
Born about 1182, he was the son and heir of Everard de Ros (died before 1184) and his wife Roese (died 1194), daughter of William Trussebut, of Warter. Robert "Farfan" had a sister Alice, who married William II de Percy, 3rd feudal baron of Topcliffe (d. 1174/5), and left two daughters Maud and Agnes as co-heiresses. The Ros family, from the village of Roos in Yorkshire, had in 1158 acquired the barony of Helmsley, also in Yorkshire, and before 1189 by gift of King Henry II the barony of Wark on Tweed in Northumberland.

== Career ==
Left fatherless, his lands were initially in the keeping of the Chief Justiciar of England, Ranulf de Glanvill. In 1191, though under age, he paid a 1,000-mark fee to inherit his father's lands. In that year he also married a widow who was an illegitimate daughter of King William I of Scotland. Later he inherited from his mother one-third of the Trussebut estates, which included lands near the town of Bonneville-sur-Touques in Normandy, of which he became hereditary bailiff and castellan.

In 1196, during fighting between King Richard I of England and King Philip II of France, Richard captured a French knight worth a significant ransom and put him in the castle of Bonneville. When the keeper of the castle let the knight escape, an angry Richard had the man hanged and imprisoned Ros, fining him 1,200 marks (though he was later let off 275 marks).

Like many magnates, he had an uneasy relationship with King John after 1199. He witnessed the King's charters, served in his armies, went on diplomatic missions for him (one in 1199 to Ros's father-in-law in Scotland), and on one occasion was reported gambling with him in Ireland. Tension arose in 1205, when John ordered his lands to be seized but later relented. It was possibly then that his younger son was taken as a hostage by the King.

In 1206 he was given permission to mortgage his lands if during the next three years he went to Jerusalem, as a crusading knight or as an individual pilgrim. The permission was renewed in 1207, but his record was marred by the escape that year of another prisoner under his supervision, for which he was fined 300 marks. Back in favour in 1209, he was sent again on a diplomatic mission to Scotland but does not seem to have gone to Palestine, for in 1210 he was serving with John in Ireland.

In 1212, on account of him entering a monastic order, John gave custody of his lands to Sir Philip Oldcoates. But he re-entered secular life the next year, when the King made him sheriff of Cumberland and appointed him to a commission investigating grievances in Lincolnshire and Yorkshire. In the latter county, he worked for a reconciliation between John and William de Forz, heir to the extensive estates there of Hawise, Countess of Aumale.

In October 1213 he was one of the witnesses when John surrendered England to the authority of the Pope and he was one of the twelve guarantors appointed to ensure John kept his promises. Throughout the disturbances of 1214 and the first quarter of 1215 he remained loyal to John, being rewarded with royal manors in Cumberland and royal support for the election of his aunt as abbess of Barking Abbey. However he then joined the rebel barons as one of the 25 chosen to enforce observance of Magna Carta, being appointed by them to control Yorkshire and possibly Northumberland. For this he was excommunicated by the Pope, and John gave his lands to William de Forz.

Ordered by John to give up Carlisle Castle, he did so but remained on the rebel side after the death of John in October 1216, supporting Prince Louis even after his elder son was captured by the loyalist side in May 1217. He finally submitted later that year, and regained most of his lands. Intermittent unrest in Yorkshire continued, with fighting in 1220 between his men and those of the sheriff, followed in 1221 with him being summoned to help take and destroy Skipsea Castle during the rebellion of William de Forz.

In 1225 he was one of the witnesses to the reissue of Magna Carta and by the end of 1226 had re-entered a monastic order, possibly the Knights Templar. His Helmsley estates, where he had fortified the castle, then went to his elder son, while Wark, also fortified by him, went to the younger. He died that year, or in 1227, and was buried in the Temple Church in London.

== Benefactions ==
He was a supporter of the Knights Templar, giving them lands in Yorkshire that included Ribston, where they set up a commandery. At Bolton in Northumberland, he founded a leper hospital dedicated to St Thomas Becket, endowing it with extensive lands. He was also a benefactor of Rievaulx Abbey, Newminster Abbey and Kirkham Priory.

== Family ==
Early in 1191, at Haddington near Edinburgh, he married Isabella, widow of Robert III de Brus and illegitimate daughter of William I "the Lion", King of Scotland. Her mother was said to be a daughter of Robert Avenel.

Their children included:

- William (died about 1265), of Helmsley, whose wife was named Lucy, and their son was Robert (died 1285).
- Robert (died about 1270), of Wark, who married Christina, daughter of William Bertram, of Mitford, and their son Robert (died about 1274) was his heir.
