= Pwll y wrach =

Waterfall in Powys, Wales

Coordinates: 51.9865°N 3.2176°W

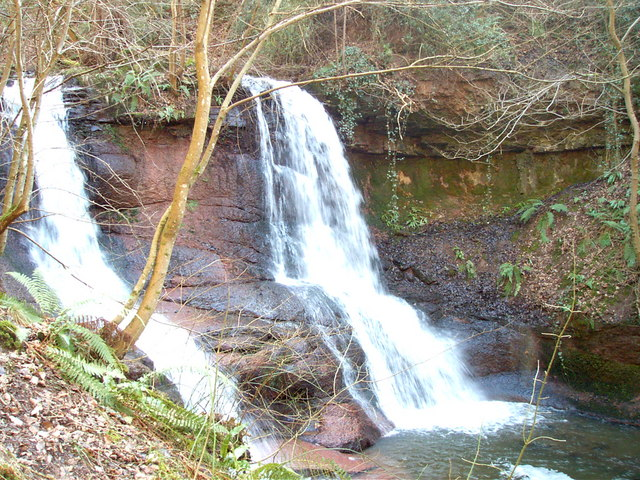
Waterfall at Pwll y Wrach

Pwll y wrach or Pwll-y-wrach (Welsh for "pool of the witch") is a feature on the River Ennig near Talgarth in south Powys, Wales. The river plunges in two separate streams over a lip of hard rock (Bishop's Frome Limestone, formerly known as Psammosteus Limestone) into a pool scoured in the softer mudstones of the underlying Raglan Mudstone formation.

The feature occurs within Cwm Pwll-y-wrach, a deep wooded valley that is a Site of Special Scientific Interest and a nature reserve managed by the Brecknock Wildlife Trust. The trust has established trails within the wood to enable public access.

It is suggested that the name derives from the ancient practice of ducking witches in the plunge pool.
