= Scethrog Tower =

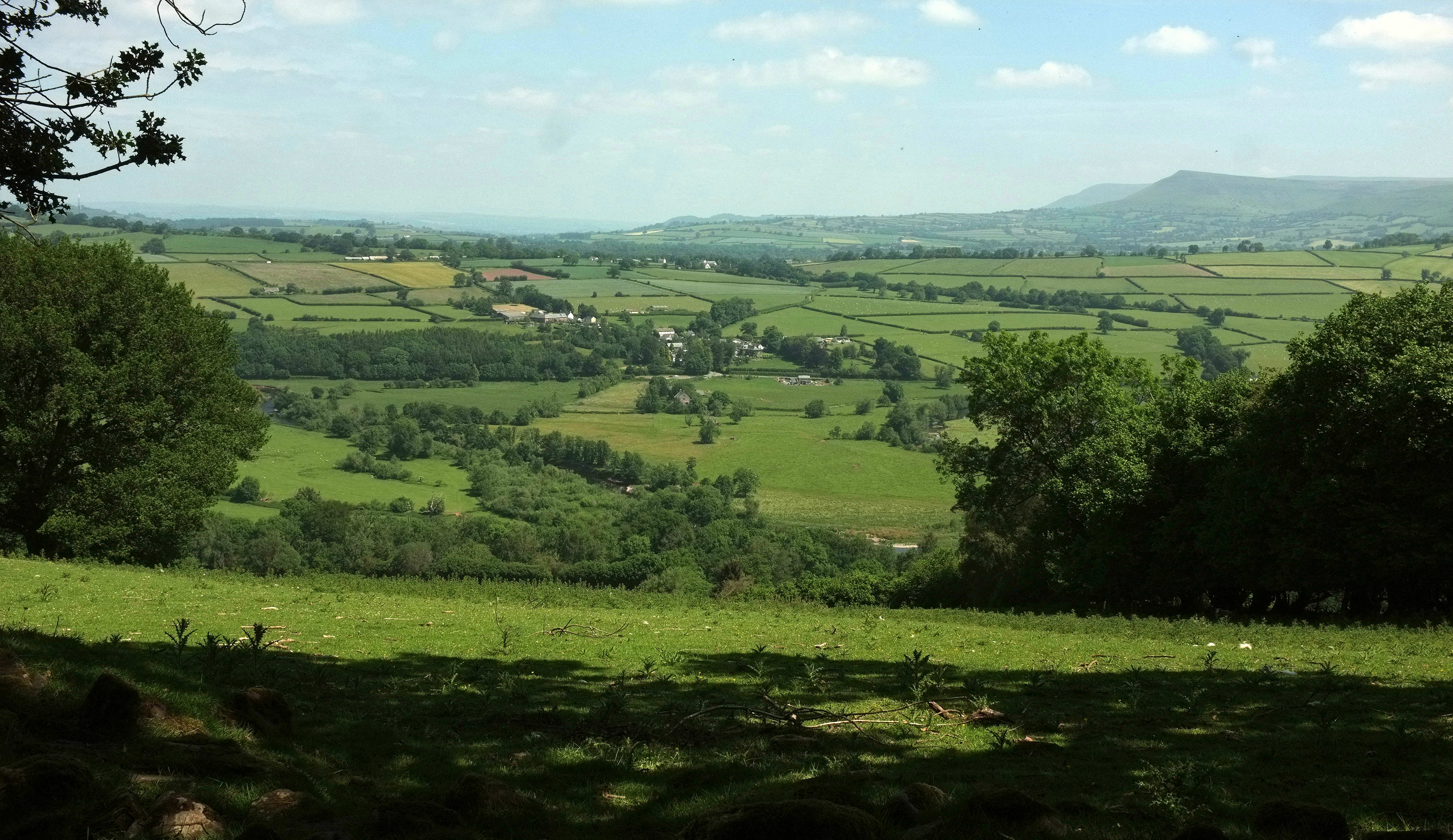
- Scethrog Tower is visible in the very centre of the image, to the south of the village and to the north of the river

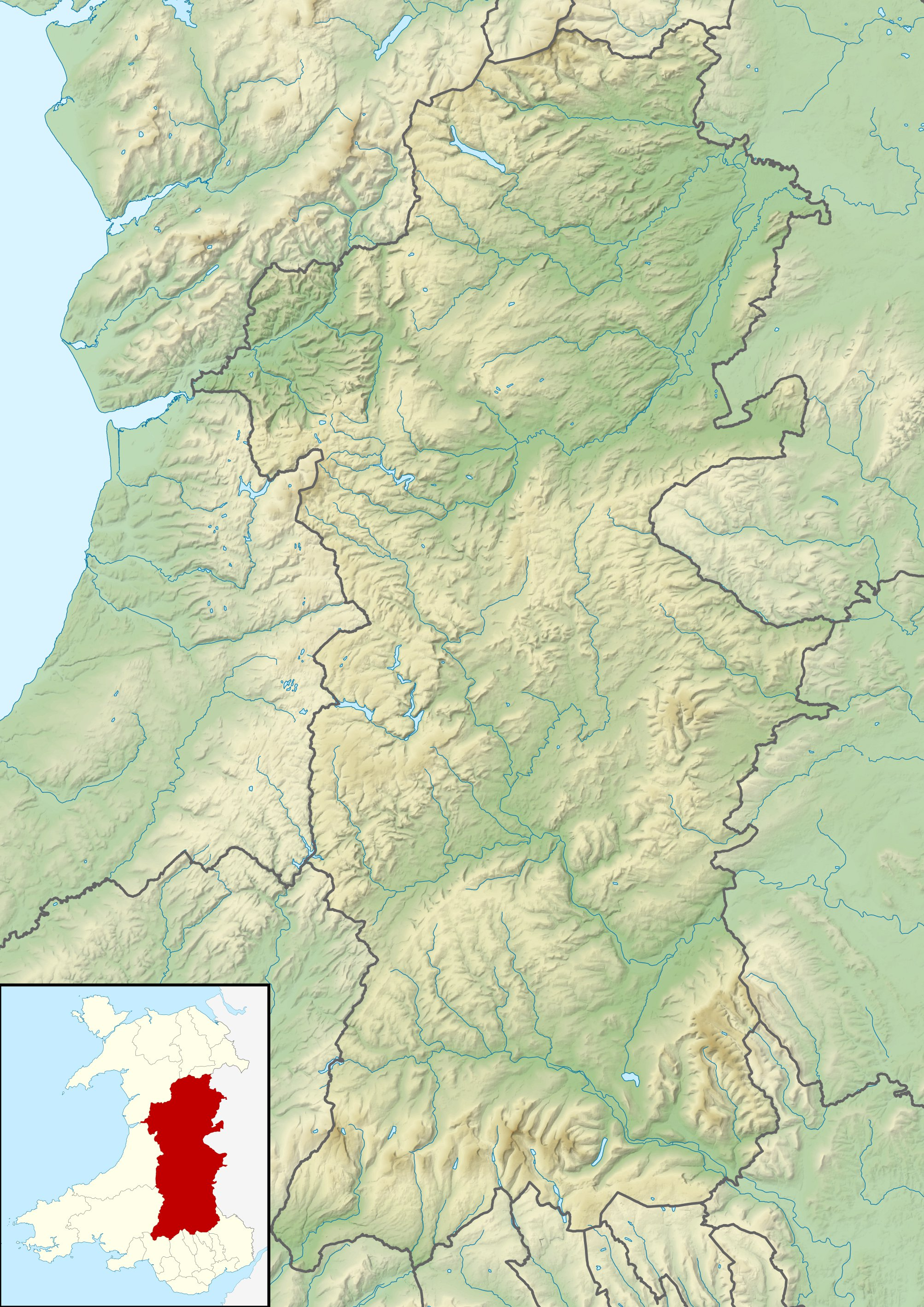
- Location within Powys
- 51.9158°N 3.3032°W
- Type: Tower house
- Location: Scethrog, Talybont-on-Usk, Powys, Wales

History
- Built: 14th century

Site notes
- Governing body: Privately owned

Listed Building – Grade I
- Official name: The Tower, Scethrog
- Designated: 25 September 1951
- Reference no.: 6800

Listed Building – Grade II
- Official name: Barn to the north of The Tower
- Designated: 17 December 1998
- Reference no.: 21191

Scethrog Tower stands to the south of the hamlet of Scethrog, in the Usk valley between Brecon and Crickhowell, in Powys, Wales. A tower house dating from the 14th century, in the late 20th century it was the country home of the musician and critic, George Melly. It is a Grade I listed building.

== History and description ==
The earliest history of the tower is uncertain. Both Cadw and the Royal Commission on the Ancient and Historical Monuments of Wales date it to the 14th century, and both agree that the site was developed in the 16th century into a larger Elizabethan manor, of which the tower would have been a part. It has been suggested that it was also a part of an earlier, and larger, castle, although this is disputed and current archaeological thinking discounts the possibility. The tower was subject to substantial alteration in the 16th century, and further reconfigured in the 18th century. (Note: The Vernacular Architecture Group gives tree-ring dates for timbers used in the structure to around 1580 and considers the building was largely reconstructed and expanded in the early 17th century.) It stands on an artificial mound, with a water feature to the west, which has been variously described as a moat, and as an element of flood defences.

In the later 20th century the tower was the country home of the musician and critic, George Melly, who did much to support the development of the Brecon Jazz Festival. For Melly, the tower's attractions included its proximity to the River Usk where he could indulge his passion for fly fishing. Joan Bakewell, a close friend of Melly's wife, Diana, recorded the many fellow fishing enthusiasts whom Melly entertained at the tower, although the limited number of bedrooms required Jeremy Paxman to sleep in a tent in the grounds. Melly, a discerning art collector, sold pictures by René Magritte and Pablo Picasso bought for low prices in the 1950s and 1960s, to fund the purchase of a mile-long stretch of riverbank along the Usk behind the tower, facilitating his access to the river. Another friend of Diana Melly was the writer Bruce Chatwin. Much of his novel, On the Black Hill, was written at Scethrog and it is dedicated to Diana. (Note: Chatwin was an inveterate house-guest, his friend, the fashion designer Loulou de la Falaise, called him a 'pique assiette' (plate thief). He stayed with a number of friends while writing On the Black Hill, leading to an argument between his publisher, Tom Maschler, and George Melly as to whether the majority of the book had been written at Scethrog or at Maschler's cottage at Llanthony.) Melly sold the tower in 1999 when declining health meant he was no longer able to fish. It remains a private home.

The tower is a Grade I listed building. A barn to the north, with 16th century origins, has a Grade II listing. Robert Scourfield and Richard Haslam, in their Powys volume in the Buildings of Wales series, note that Scethrog is one of only two such tower houses in Powys, the other being that overlooking the square in Talgarth.

== Sources ==
- Bakewell, Joan (2016). Stop the Clocks: Thoughts on What I Leave Behind. Boston, US: Little, Brown and Company. ISBN 978-0-349-00610-9.
- Scourfield, Robert; Haslam, Richard (2013). Powys: Montgomeryshire, Radnorshire and Breconshire. The Buildings of Wales. New Haven, US and London: Yale University Press. ISBN 978-0-300-18508-9.
- Shakespeare, Nicholas (2010). Bruce Chatwin. New York, US and London: Random House. ISBN 978-1-407-07433-7.
