= Jane Cave =

Welsh poet writing in English

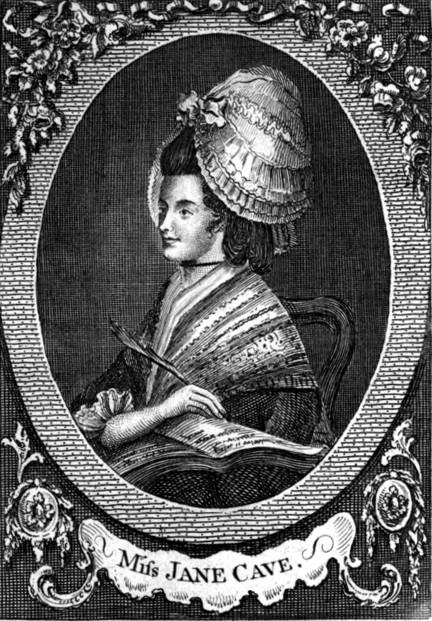
- Born: c. 1754 probably Talgarth, Wales
- Died: 1812; Newport
- Known for: Religious poetry
- Spouse: Thomas Wiscon

Jane Cave (c. 1754 – 1812) was a poet who was probably born in Talgarth and died in Newport in Wales. She wrote in English and moved around England during her lifetime. She is particularly known for her poetry on religious subjects and on her headaches.

She suffered from monthly headaches which left her helpless for days. Based on the described symptoms in her works, modern biographers suspect that her health problems consisted of migraines.

== Life ==
Cave was born in about 1754, possibly in Talgarth in South Wales. Her father John Cave was converted to the Welsh Methodist movement by Howel Harris, a figure in the religious revival in Wales and an associate of Methodists John and Charles Wesley. Cave educated herself by reading books and poetry. She is thought to have worked, and her father worked for the excise.

Cave was a writer and her life can be presumed from her extant writing. Her mother was living until 1777, and she had sisters. She wrote following the death of Howell Harris in 1773 and that of George Whitfield and when chapels were consecrated. The chapels in question were part of the religious group known as the Countess of Huntingdon's Connexion but Cave was known to also go to Anglican churches.

She moved to Winchester in 1779. She admired the poets Anna Seward, Anne Steele, and Hannah More. Her first book was published thanks to a very long list of subscribers in 1783 and this was followed by another in 1786. By this time she had become Mrs Winscom. She moved around the country as her new husband, like her father, worked for the excise.

In 1793 she published in Bristol a 50-line descriptive poem, and plea for any assistance that may exist for her headaches. It has been noted that this was published in one of her books. The preceding poem was about bathing in Teignmouth as a proposed cure for headaches and the one following the Bristol poem was titled "An Invocation to Death". These are now thought to be migraines and she would lose maybe twelve days a month. It has been speculated that the monthly headaches may have related to her menstrual cycle.

In 1801 and 1806 Cave published additional poems which describe a difficult time in her marriage to Thomas. The book was titled "Prose and Poetry, on Religious, Moral and Entertaining Subjects," and it was published under the name of "Mrs Rueful".

== Death ==
She died in Newport in Monmouthshire in 1812 and her funeral service was on 27 November. Her obituary was published in The Gentleman's Magazine.
