= Talgarth Town Hall =

Municipal Building in Talgarth, Wales

- Neuadd y Dref Talgarth (Welsh)
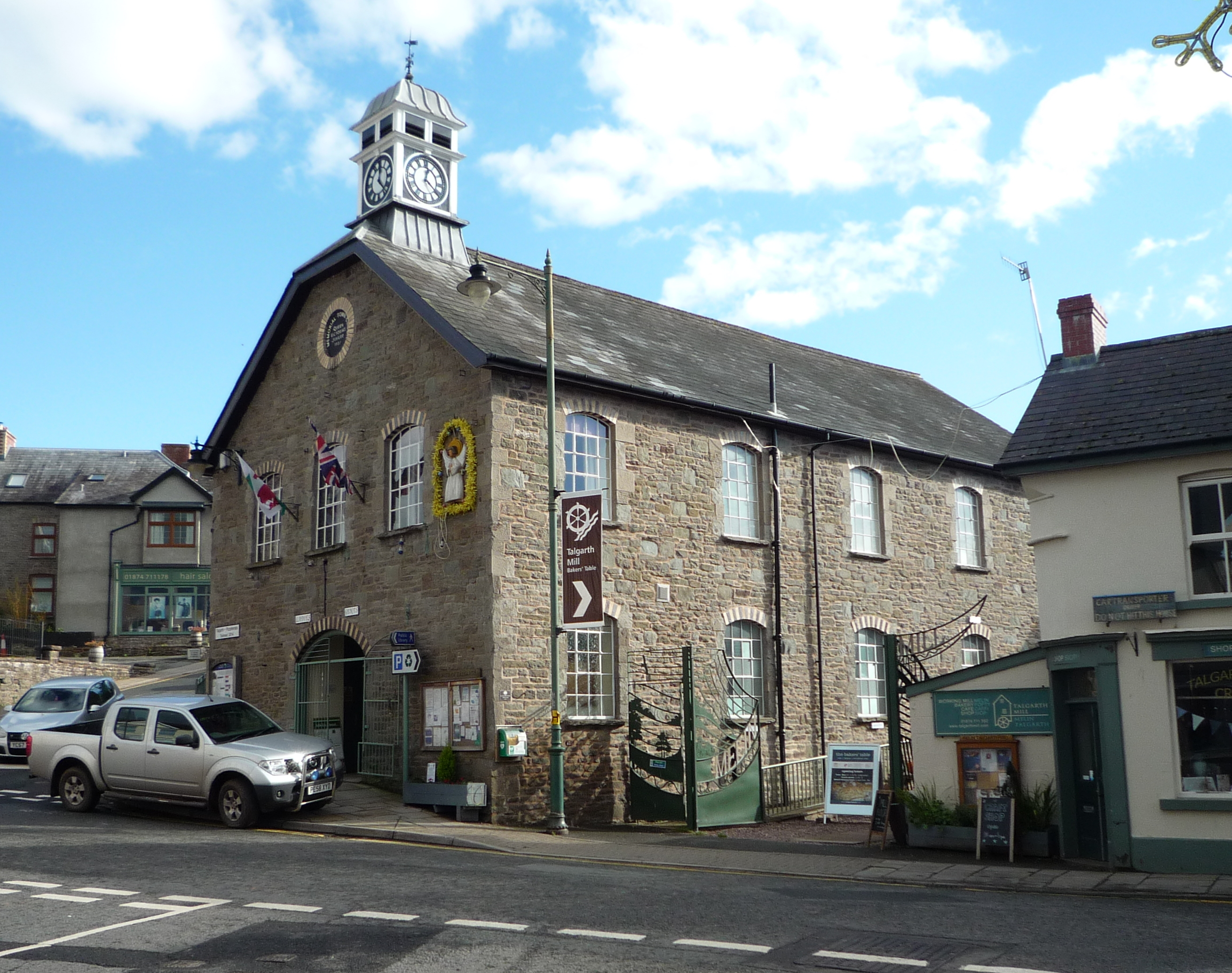
- Talgarth Town Hall

- Shown in Powys
- 51.9958°N 3.2321°W
- Location: The Bank, Talgarth

History
- Built: 1878

Site notes
- Architect: Thomas Lawrence Lewis
- Architectural style: Neoclassical style

Listed Building – Grade II
- Official name: Town Hall
- Designated: 24 September 1985
- Reference no.: 7480

Talgarth Town Hall (Welsh: Neuadd y Dref Talgarth), is a municipal building on The Bank, Talgarth, Powys, Wales. The structure, which is the meeting place of Talgarth Town Council, is a Grade II listed building.

== History ==
In the mid-1870s, a group of local landowners led by Francis William Alexander Roche, whose seat was at Tregunter Park and who had led various initiatives to promote Talgarth as a market town, decided to commission a market hall for the town. The site they selected was made available by Bertram Ashburnham, 4th Earl of Ashburnham, whose seat was at Pembrey House, on a 99-year lease at a nominal rent.

The foundation stone for the new building was laid by Roche on 17 July 1877. It was designed by Thomas Lawrence Lewis of Swansea in the neoclassical style, built by James Webb of Hay-on-Wye in rubble masonry at a cost of £700 and was completed in 1878. The design involved a symmetrical main frontage with three bays facing onto the corner of Hay Road and The Bank; there was a round headed opening with voussoirs and a wrought iron gate in the central bay on the ground floor, three segmental headed windows with voussoirs on the first floor and a central oculus in the gable above. The structure was surmounted by a quarter-hipped roof. Internally, the principal rooms were the market hall on the ground floor and the assembly room on the first floor.

A central clock turret with an ogee-shaped dome and a finial was installed as part of the celebrations for the Golden Jubilee of Queen Victoria in 1887. Following implementation of the Local Government Act 1894, which established parish councils in rural areas, a parish council was formed in Talgarth with its offices in the town hall. In August 1918, at the start of the First World War, a recruiting event was held in the town hall: 20 young men immediately enlisted. In the early 1920s, a brass plaque commemorating the lives of local service personnel who had died in the war was unveiled in the town hall; in 1957, in a "gesture of reverence" the brass plaque was buried under the town's stone war memorial in Bronllys Road.

In August 1958, the town hall was the venue for a lecture given by the nuclear physicist, John H. Fremlin, about the level of contamination by Strontium-90 in the area, during which he encouraged farmers to check the level of radioactivity in their cattle. Following implementation of the Local Government Act 1972, the parish council evolved to become Talgarth Town Council but continued to use the building as its meeting place.

Service wings, which had been added to the east side of the building, were remodelled in 1994, and the brass war memorial plaque, which had been buried under the stone war memorial in Bronllys Road was recovered and returned to the town hall in 2016. Another plaque, intended to commemorate the gold medal won by the locally-born table tennis player, Rob Davies, at the 2016 Summer Paralympics, was unveiled in the town hall in November 2016.
