= Everard de Ros =

English landowner

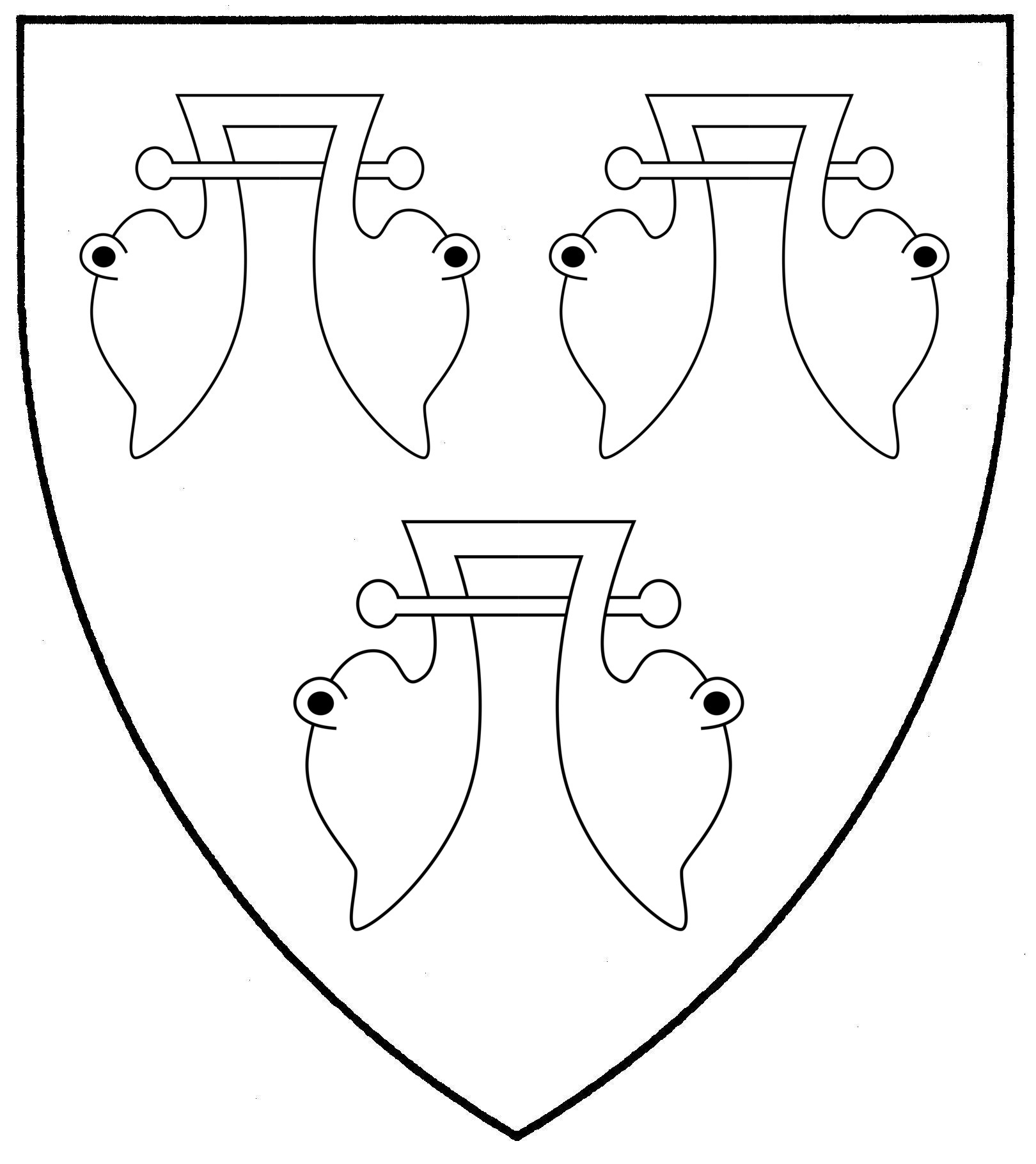
- Born: c. 1145; Helmsley, England
- Died: c. 1183; North Yorkshire, England

Everard de Ros (c. 1145 – c. 1183) was the lord of Hamlake (now known as Helmsley).

== Life ==
Originally a ward of Ranulph de Granville, Everard seems to have been wealthy, as in 1176 he paid the then large sum of five hundred twenty-six pounds as a fine for his lands, and other large amounts subsequently. He was the son of Robert de Ros and Sybil de Valoines. Everard de Ros married Rose Trusbut (in 1170 or 1171) with whom he had two sons, the oldest of which, Robert de Ros, became a Magna Carta surety. After 1170–71, he assumed the arms of Trussebut of Warter.

== Death ==
Everard died around 1183; he and his wife (both apparently great benefactors to various religious institutes) are buried in the church of Hunmanby.
