= Blaenllynfi Castle =

13th century castle ruin in Powys, Wales

Coordinates: 51.8981°N 3.2437°W

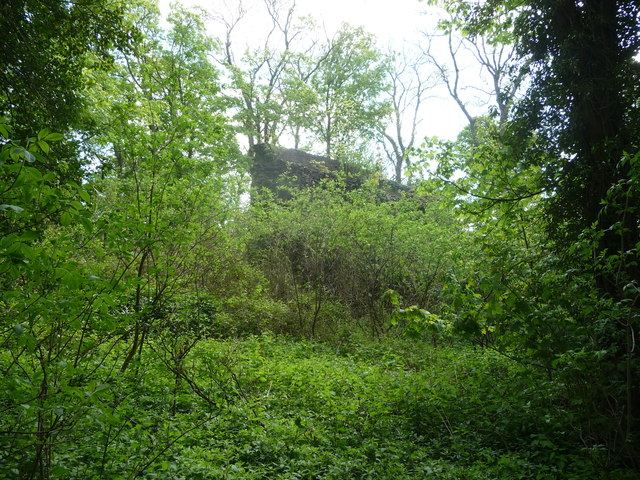
The ruins of Blaenllyfni Castle

Blaenllynfi Castle (Welsh: Castell Blaenllynfi) is a privately owned ruinous stone castle near the village of Bwlch in southern Powys, Wales. It was probably built in the early thirteenth century. It was captured several times during the rest of the century and apparently was never fully repaired afterwards and fell into ruins. It is a Scheduled Ancient Monument.

== History ==
It was the caput (head) of the Marcher Lordship of Blaenllynfi (the lands of which later became the barony of Talgarth). The Lordship was created in 1208, from part of the Lordship of Brecknock, when the Lord of Brecknock (William de Braose) fell out with King John in a spectacularly bad manner. The first Marcher Lord of Blaenllynfi was Peter FitzHerbert, William's cousin; their mothers were co-heirs of William de Hereford, former Lord of Brecknock.

The castle was therefore most likely constructed in 1208–15; after that period the Braose family briefly managed to re-assert control over Blaenllynfi, as part of the general insurrection against King John, before the Lordship of Blaenllynfi was returned to FitzHerbert in 1217–18, following King John's death. Though Blaenllynfi remained the caput, the growth of Talgarth, and its consequent rise in importance within the Lordship, meant that the Lordship often came to be referred to as the Lordship of Talgarth.

William de Braose was succeeded by his younger son, Reginald de Braose, who married Gwladus Ddu, the daughter of Llywelyn Fawr (the ruling prince of Gwynedd). Meanwhile, King John's successor, Henry III, equally had trouble with his barons, his chief opponent being Richard Marshal, 3rd Earl of Pembroke. In August 1233, Richard refused to attend the king, and was thus declared traitor. Subsequently, Richard formed an alliance with LLywelyn, and jointly attacked Blaenllynfi castle that October.

Soon rebuilt, the castle was again attacked when the Second Barons' War broke out, in 1262; it was apparently taken by Llywelyn ap Gruffudd (grandson of Llywelyn Fawr), but by September 1273 it had been retaken by Peter's son, Reginald FitzPiers, who was nevertheless chastised for his castle-taking activities. In 1305, FitzPiers' son, John FitzReginald, granted a manor within the Lordship to Rhys ap Hywel, an ally of King Edward I and the heir of the last king of Brycheiniog (the realm which became the Lordship of Brecknock). Two years later, in 1308, following the Edward I's death, John granted the reversion of all his lands to the new king, Edward II; in 1309, the king issued a charter granting the reversion of these lands to Rhys.

However, like his more powerful allies among the Marcher Lords, Rhys was opposed to the machinations of the king's favourite, Hugh Despenser, and following an attempted insurrection, around 1322, the king seized the Lordship of Blaenllynfi and gave it to the Despensers. The castle had probably never been adequately repaired after the siege by Llywelyn ap Gruffydd, and at the time of Hugh's death, in 1326, it was nearly ruinous.

Rhys had taken a central role in the coup that year, against Hugh and Edward, being part of the search party who captured them, when they had tried to flee. The coup organisers returned the Lordship to Rhys, and upon Rhys' death it was inherited by his son, Philip. An inquisition by jury found many defects in the castle on 23 January 1337, although archaeological evidence shows that the defences were improved around this time.

Philip's brother, Einion Sais (great-grandfather of Sir Dafydd Gam) was a prominent military supporter of the new king - Edward III - but the king (Edward II's son) allowed himself to be persuaded by the Lord of Brecknock (Humphrey de Bohun) that a place like Blaenllynfi should be ruled by a powerful magnate like Humphrey, rather than a weak one such as Philip, so Edward transferred the realm to Humphrey, re-unifying the Lordship of Brecknock.

== Description ==
The castle covered an area of approximately 78 by 56 metres (85 by 61 yd) within a moat with dimensions of 120 by 100 metres (130 by 110 yd). The remains of walls, buttresses and towers can be found inside and they have been partially excavated by the owner. The site is an Ancient Scheduled Monument.
