= Isabel daughter of William the Lion =

Illegitimate daughter of William the Lion

Isabel daughter of William (born c. 1165) (Gaelic: Isibéal nighean Uilleim) was the illegitimate daughter of William I of Scotland by a daughter of Robert Avenel. She married Robert III de Brus in 1183; they had no children. After his death in 1191, Isabella was married to Robert de Ros, Baron Ros of Wark (died 1227). They had the following children:

- Sir William de Ros (b. before 1200 – d. ca. 1264/1265).
- Sir Robert de Ros (ca. 1223 – 13 May 1285), was Chief Justice of the Kings Bench. He married Christian Bertram.
- Sir Alexander de Ros (d. ca. 1306), who fathered one child, William, with an unknown wife.
- Peter de Ros.
