= Talgarth Festival =

Annual event in Powys, Wales

The Talgarth Festival of the Black Mountains is an annual event which takes place in the small market town of Talgarth in Mid Wales and includes live music, food and drink vendors, craft stalls, and artisan producers from across Wales. The festival also features animals prominently, with a cattle market and a recurring duck race in the River Ennig. It takes place over the August Bank holiday weekend. In 2024, the festival added a gardening show as a new event. Began 1995, the Talgarth Festival continues to grow in size and popularity, with 2025 marking its 30th anniversary.
