= Afon Llynfi (Wye) =

River in Powys, Wales

Coordinates: 52°02′N 3°12′W

The Afon Llynfi is a short river in the county of Powys, south Wales. A tributary of the River Wye, it runs approximately south to north just to the west of the Black Mountains and partly within the Brecon Beacons National Park.

== Geography ==
The river rises as a small stream to the west of the village of Bwlch and flows north for two miles into Llangorse Lake. It leaves the lake just to the southwest of the village of Llangors and follows a course past the hamlets of Trefecca and Tredustan. The river then travels between the twin villages of Talgarth and Bronllys, forming the boundary of the national park in part. It then flows northeast past the village of Three Cocks (otherwise known as Aberllynfi) before entering the River Wye just upstream of Glasbury Bridge.

The Afon Llynfi is joined by a number of tributary streams including the Tawel and Gwlithen on its left bank and the Nant Cwy (emptying directly into the lake) and Nant yr Eiddil on its right bank. The two largest tributaries are those of the Dulas which enters on the left just above Bronllys Castle Bridge and the River Ennig which enters just downstream on the opposite bank, having flowed through Talgarth. The publicly accessible falls at Pwll y Wrach on this tributary are a local attraction.

== Geology ==
During the deglaciation of Wales there was a period when ice from the Wye Valley Glacier blocked the exit of the river into the Wye. The waters of the Llynfi backed up at Llangors to the point where they overflowed the cols at Pennorth and at Bwlch (both at a height of 189m) and flowed south into the River Usk which was by this time free of ice. This situation prevailed for several hundred years as evidenced by lake deposits beneath and around Llangorse Lake.

== 2020 pollution incident ==
In 2020 a pollution incident on the Llynfi resulted in an extensive fish kill and other ecological damage.

== See also ==
- Pwll y wrach, the "Pool of the Witch" near Talgarth.
