= Talgarth =

Market town and community in Powys, Wales

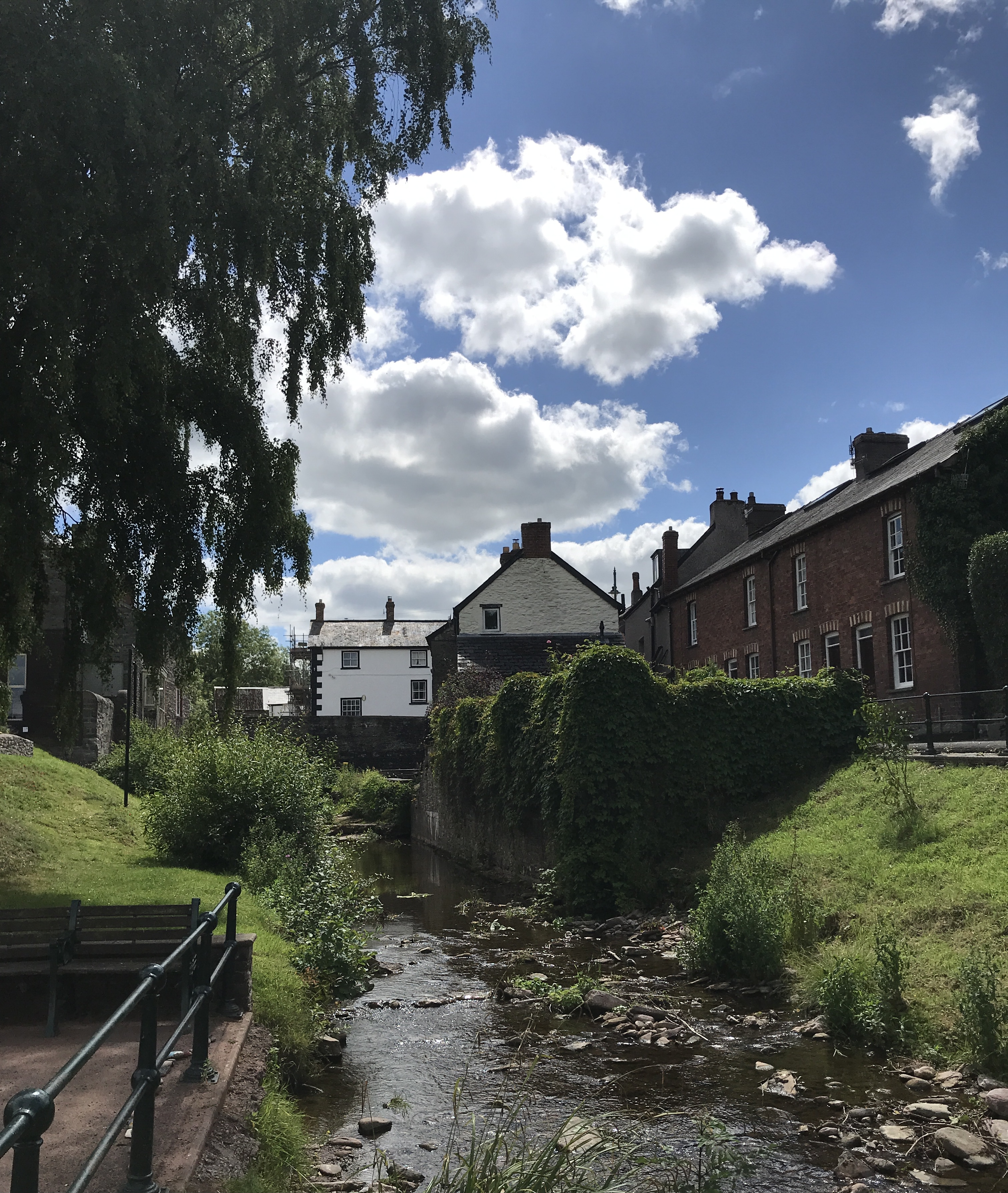
- The River Ennig in Talgarth

- Location within Powys
- Population: 2,000 (2023)
- OS grid reference: SO1533
- Community: Talgarth
- Principal area: Powys
- Preserved county: Powys
- Country: Wales
- Sovereign state: United Kingdom
- Post town: BRECON
- Postcode district: LD3
- Dialling code: 01874
- Police: Dyfed-Powys
- Fire: Mid and West Wales
- Ambulance: Welsh
- UK Parliament: Brecon, Radnor and Cwm Tawe
- Senedd Cymru – Welsh Parliament: Brecon and Radnorshire
- List of places UK Wales Powys 51.996°N 3.232°W Community map: Map of the community

Talgarth is a market town, community and electoral ward in southern Powys, Mid Wales, about 12 miles (19 km) north of Crickhowell, 19 miles (31 km) north-east of Brecon and 15 miles (24 km) south-east of Builth Wells. Notable buildings in the town include the 14th-century parish church and a defensive tower house. According to traditional accounts, Talgarth was the capital of the early medieval kingdom of Brycheiniog. It is in the historic county of Brecknockshire. In 2011, it had a population of 1,724.

== Name ==
The town's name derives from the Welsh words tâl (forehead or brow of a hill) and garth (mountain ridge or promontory), thus meaning "end of the ridge". It appears as Talgart in 1121, as Talgard after 1130, and in its present form in the years between 1203 and 1208.

The church of Talgarth is recorded in 1488 as dedicated to Sce Wenne Virginis, explained as Gwen (granddaughter of Brychan).

== Culture and community ==
The Talgarth Festival of the Black Mountains, a popular countryside event, is held each August. Talgarth Walking Festival takes place in May, making use of the town's position at the foot of the Black Mountains.

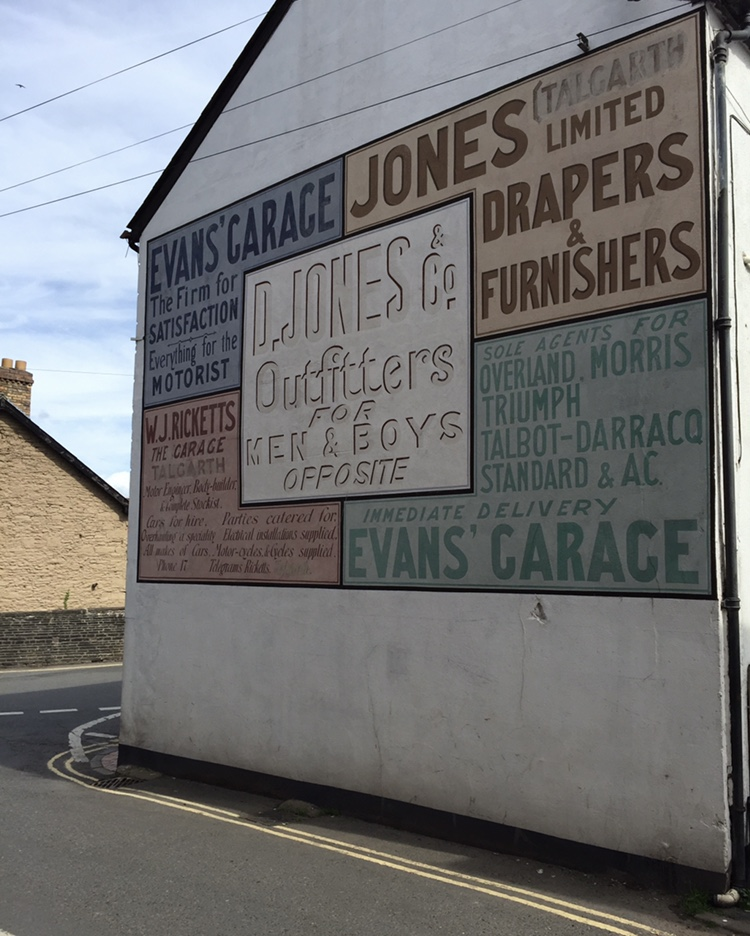
An historic advertisement hoarding in Bell Street

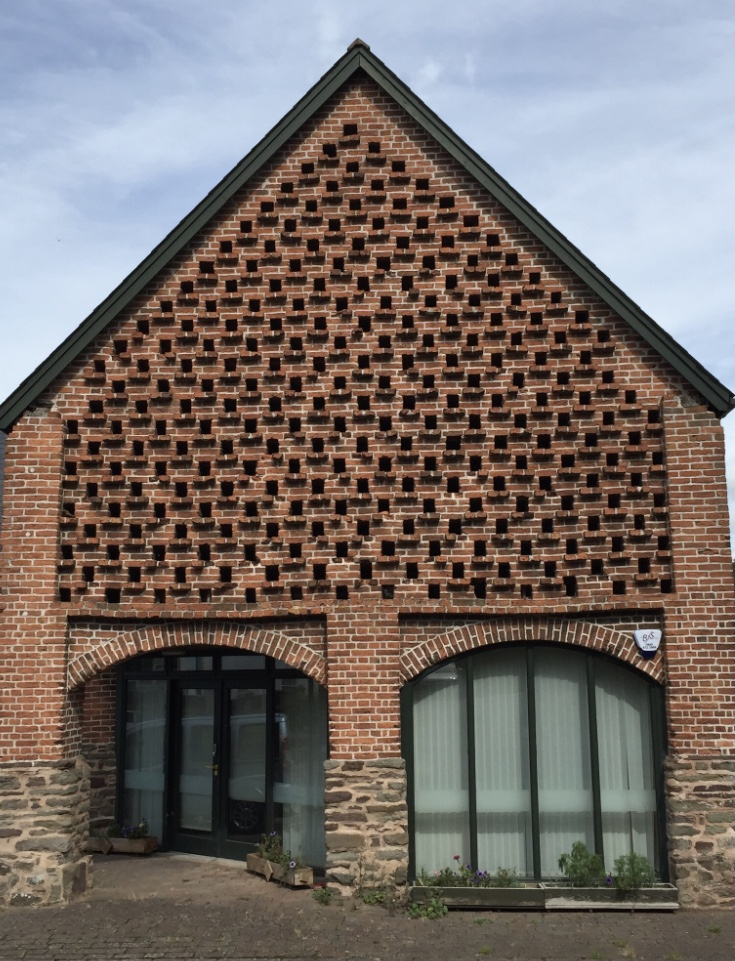
The dovecotes at the Great Barn in the centre of Talgarth

Talgarth was an important healthcare location for many years, as the home of the large psychiatric hospital, the Mid Wales Hospital and the Mid and West Wales College of Nursing and Midwifery. Changes in health legislation in the 1980s saw such hospitals closed. The Mid Wales Hospital closed permanently in the 1990s. Since the early 2000s, regeneration efforts have been in place to support Talgarth's future. A relief road has reduced road traffic in the town centre, allowing new businesses to open and buildings to be renovated and restored. The historic mill in the centre of town featured on the BBC's Village SOS television series.

== History ==
=== Roman period ===
A fort near Cwmdu (Pen-y-Gaer) is of significance to Talgarth, as it was the site where a 1st-century AD British chieftain, Caratacus (of the Catuvellauni tribe), fought with the Romans.

=== Subroman Period ===
Talgarth was the royal residence of Brychan, King of Brycheiniog, in the 5th century AD. With three wives, 24 daughters and 24 sons, the family was an important force in Wales and responsible for the spread of Christianity throughout the region.

=== The Normans ===
Talgarth (and Brycheiniog in general) was seized by the Norman Bernard of Neufmarché, who issued an undated charter concerning the district. (Note: Bernard of Neufmarché's charter, due to poor 17th century publishing practice (the charter was included in the 1655 publication Monastican Anglicanum by Roger Dodsworth, amalgamated with another of Bernard's charters, the latter being dated 1088) and a Victorian marginal note (the charter re-appears with an added marginal gloss AD 1088 in the 1867 work Historia et cartularium Monasterii Sancti Petri Gloucestriae by William Hart) is now dated by some people to 1088.) The town became part of Bernard's Lordship of Brecknock (a Marcher lordship – an almost sovereign state). The Normans established Castell Dinas to control the passes on both sides.

In the reign of King John, the then Lord fell out with the king, and the east of the lordship was detached in punishment, forming a new Marcher Lordship of Blaenllynfi, ruled by Peter FitzHerbert. Although the caput of the latter lordship was officially Blaenllynfi Castle, Talgarth was its principal town, and the lordship was sometimes called the Sub-Lordship of Talgarth as a result.

The Lordship of Blaenllynfi eventually found its way back to the descendants of the last Welsh princes of Brycheiniog (in the person of Rhys ap Hywel).

Rhys played a significant part in the implementation (though not the planning) of the final coup against Edward II, and consequently Edward's son, Edward III, was not well disposed towards him; he dispossessed Rhys' heir, and merged the Lordship of Blaenllynfi back into the Lordship of Brecknock (which, with the Lordship of Buellt, eventually became Brecknockshire, centuries later).

=== The Welsh Jacobites ===
During the Jacobite revival, support in Talgarth was strong. The town was a Jacobite hotspot, backing Bonnie Prince Charlie in his attempt to retake the crown for the Stuarts. In 1727 a meeting of local Jacobite sympathisers in Talgarth ended with members having to appear before a local magistrate to explain their actions.

During the Jacobite rising of 1745, Bonnie Prince Charlie had expected the Welsh Jacobites to offer support, but after the Jacobite David Morgan was hanged, drawn and quartered for treason, the Welsh feared persecution. The failure of the Welsh Jacobites to join the House of Stuart prince in Derby was one of the main failures of the Jacobite uprising.

=== The Methodist revival ===
In 1735, Talgarth saw the birth of the Welsh Methodist revival when Howel Harris, probably the most influential person to come from Talgarth, was converted in Talgarth church while listening to a sermon by the Reverend Pryce Davies. The revival would sweep across Wales, leading to the development of one of the most influential Welsh denominations, that of the Calvinistic Methodists. It was at Talgarth that William Williams Pantycelyn converted, leading him to become one of Wales' most important hymn writers. Nearby is Trevecca, the location of the famous college that Harris established. Hywel Harris is buried in Talgarth at St Gwendoline's Church and his tombstone is still visible today. Talgarth is also thought to be the birthplace of the religious poet Jane Cave.

== Buildings and other sites of note ==
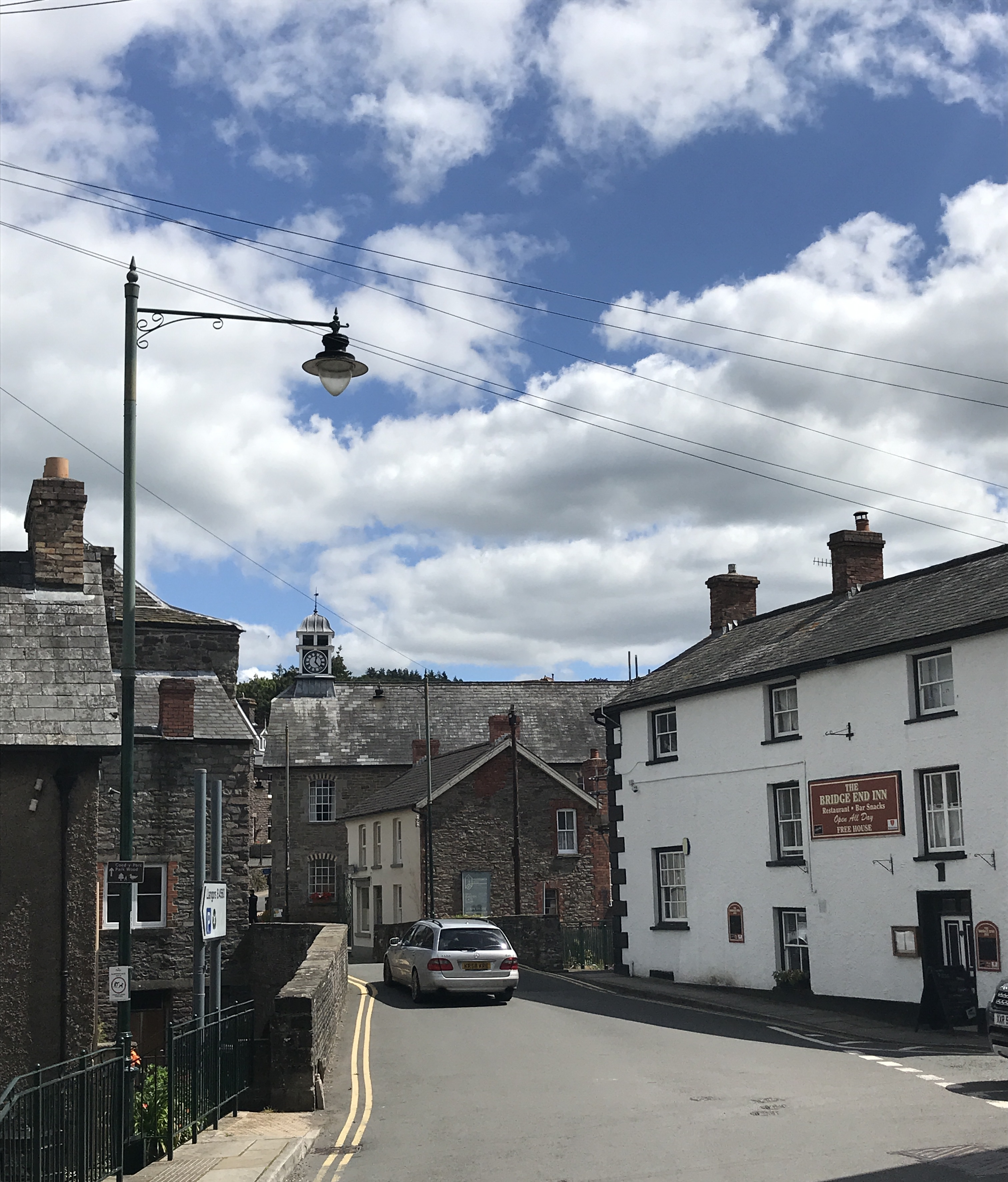
Talgarth Bridge

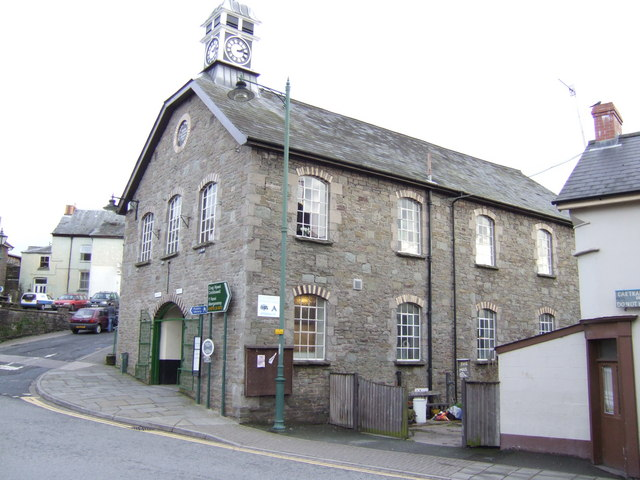
Talgarth Town Hall

- Talgarth Town Hall (1878) with a memorial clock tower, overlooking the Square
- Tower House, also overlooking the Square, now the location of the Tourist Information Centre. The present building is probably 18th century, but it may incorporate a 14th-century or later defensive tower. The tower was used as a prison or a lock-up.
- The Tower Hotel was built in 1873 for gentleman farmers to attend the livestock market
- St Gwendoline's Church, a Grade II* listed building
- Nearby Bronllys Castle

=== Talgarth Mill ===
Talgarth Mill is an 18th-century water mill in the centre of the town. In 2010 the mill, which had been unused since 1946, was fully restored using National Lottery funding to create the only working watermill in the Brecon Beacons National Park. The mill is run by volunteers as a community initiative; it includes a bakery and a cafe and sells locally made food and crafts.

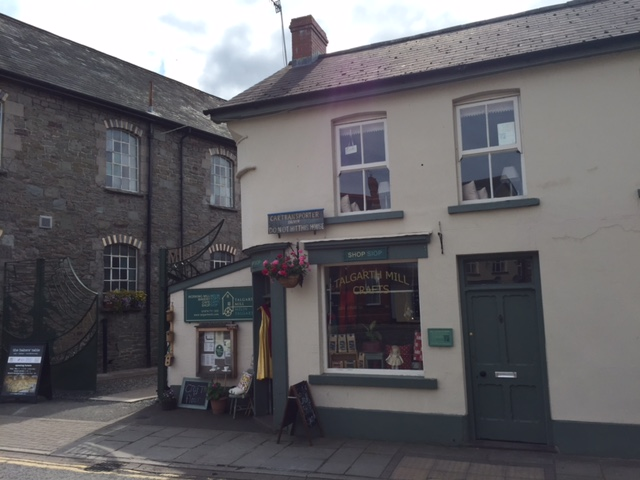
Talgarth Mill shop

=== Railway station ===
Talgarth was served by a station on the Mid-Wales Railway. This has since closed.

=== Chambered tomb – Penyrwrlodd ===
A Neolithic long cairn and chambered tomb at Penyrwrlodd, 2.5 km (1.6 mi) south of Talgarth, was discovered in June 1972 by a farmer when clearing a stone mound from a field for use as hard-standing in the farmyard. The cairn measures 5 m by 22.5 m and a maximum 3 m high, and has been carbon dated to 3,900 BC, making it an early example of its type. The discovery led to archaeological excavation of the site by Dr Savory of the National Museum of Wales. During the excavation a number of human remains were found along with a bone flute, a human rib and some worked flints and stone. The flute was made from a sheep metapodial bone, has three holes and may either have been a simple flute or whistle.

=== The Old Post Office Museum ===
The former Post Office was restored in 2019.

== Outdoor activities ==
=== Gliding ===
The Black Mountains Gliding Club is based on the hillside to the southeast of the town. It operates year-round using mountain lift, ridge lift and wave lift mechanisms.

=== Pony trekking ===
Talgarth's position next to the Black Mountains meant that it was once a popular location for pony trekking, with the sights of horses tied up outside local pubs well into the 1990s. There remain a number of riding operators in the area who hire out horses for both experienced and novice riders.

=== Walking ===
The Black Mountains above the town are used for upland hiking and hill-walking. The mountain ridges are around 2,000 feet high, with the highest point being Waun Fach at 811 metres (2,661 ft). A walking festival based on the town and its hinterland was established in 2013. The event attracts visitors at the start of May each year.

== Landscape and natural history ==
=== Geology ===
The bedrock geology beneath Talgarth and its immediate neighbourhood consists of mudstones and siltstones together with occasional sandstones, which comprise a part of the lower Old Red Sandstone succession. The rocks directly beneath the town itself are assigned to the late Silurian / early Devonian age Raglan Mudstone Formation, whilst higher ground to the south and east of the town is formed by the overlying St Maughan's Formation. At the boundary between these two formations is a thick unit of erosion-resistant limestone, which forms features in the courses of the River Ennig and other streams. Known traditionally as the Psammosteus Limestone, it was later referred to as the Bishop's Frome Limestone and more recently as the Chapel Point Limestone. This and similar limestone beds in the area are examples of calcretes, effectively carbonate-rich fossil soils, formed over thousands of years at times of non-deposition of sand and mud. Fish fragments are abundant in some strata exposed in local streamsides.

Within the Raglan Mudstone, and exposed in certain watercourses, is a distinctive rock layer known as the Townsend Tuff Bed, a tuff being a deposit of volcanic ash which has fallen from the sky, likely following a Plinian volcanic eruption in this instance.

=== Pwll-y-Wrach ===
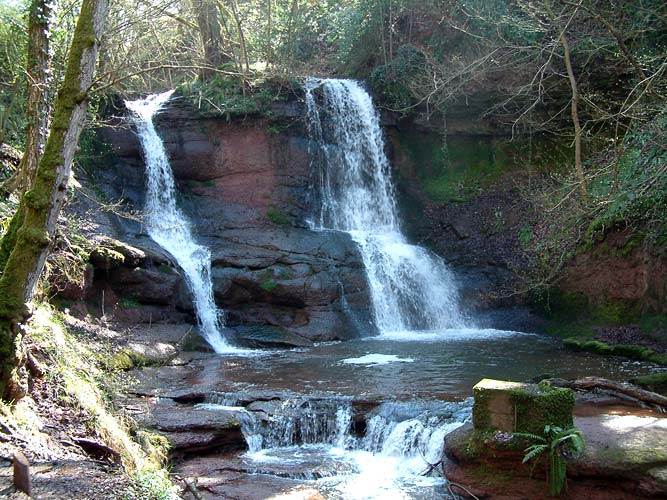
Pwll-y-Wrach waterfall

The Pwll-y-Wrach woodland stretches along both banks of the River Ennig at Pwll-y-Wrach to within 1 km (0.6 mi) of Talgarth town centre. It is designated in part as a Site of Special Scientific Interest (SSSI) due to various uncommon plants, including the small-leaved lime tree and the lesser butterfly-orchid, both regarded as indicators of ancient woodland. The Wildlife Trust of South and West Wales manage 17.5 hectares (43 acres) of the SSSI as a nature reserve. Rare species present include toothwort and bird's nest orchid. Initially smaller in extent, the reserve was established by the former Brecknock Wildlife Trust in 1984. In spring, wildflowers include bluebells followed by ramsons. The wood is home to the most important colony of dormice in the region and is also home to the lesser horseshoe bat.

There are a series of waterfalls within the wood, of which the largest is Pwll-y-Wrach, formed by a cap of the Chapel Point Limestone overlying 10 m (33 ft) of siltstones. The name means 'witch's pool'.

== Governance ==
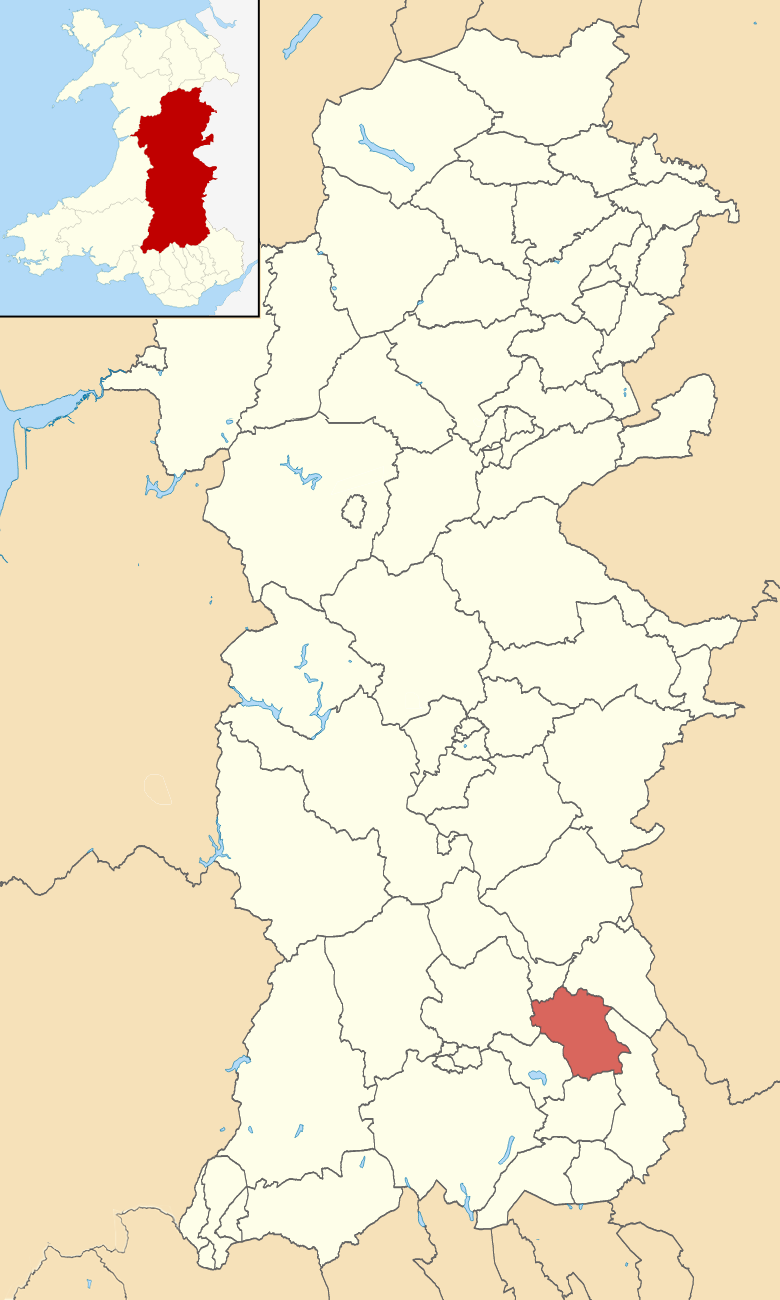
Talgarth ward (and community) location

Talgarth Town Council has twelve councillors representing the views of the community.

The Talgarth ward elects a county councillor to Powys County Council. Since May 2004 it had been represented by Liberal Democrat councillor, William Powell (who also sits on the Town Council). He was re-elected unopposed in 2008 and 2012. Powell was also an elected Assembly Member of the National Assembly for Wales from 2011 to 2016.

2017 Powys County Council election
Party	Candidate	Votes	%	±%
Liberal Democrats	William Denston Powell *	520	82.9%	
Labour	Ryan Dixon	95	15.2%	
Turnout		627		

== Notable people ==
- Edward Edwards (ca.1726 – 1783), scholar and clergyman
- Jane Cave (ca.1754 – 1812), poet, known for her poetry on religious subjects and on her headaches
- Llewela Davies (1871–1952), pianist and composer who toured with Dame Nellie Melba
- Geoff Lewis (born 1935), jockey

== In media ==
=== Filming ===
A number of films and dramas have been filmed in and around Talgarth, notably On the Black Hill. Others include Morgan's Boy, Nuts and Bolts (filmed at the old hospital), and Hearts of Gold (where the town was assumed to be Pontypridd).

=== Books ===
Talgarth features as a location in Alfred Walter Stewart's 1931 novel The Boathouse Riddle, written under the pen name J. J. Connington.

== Town twinning ==
Talgarth is twinned with Pizzoferrato, Italy.

== Bibliography ==
- Morgan, Richard (1999). A study of Breconshire Place Names. Gwasg Carreg Gwalch. ISBN 0-86381-567-7.
- Remfry, Paul (2007). Castell Bwlch y Dinas and the families of Neufmarché, Hereford, Braose, Fitz Herbert, Mortimer and Talbot. SCS. ISBN 978-1-899376-79-7.
- Salter, Mike (2001). The Castles of Mid Wales. Folly Publications. ISBN 1-871731-48-8.
- Williams, Roger (1996). Talgarth-Jewel of the Black Mountains. Old Bakehouse Publications. ISBN 1-874538-60-3.
