= Peter FitzHerbert =

English nobleman

- Arms of Peter FitzHerbert: Gules, three lions rampant or.

Sheriff of Yorkshire
- In office 1214–1215

Personal details
- Died: 1235
- Spouse(s): 1. Alice de Warkworth; 2. Isabel de Ferriers
- Parent(s): Herbert FitzHerbert; Lucy of Hereford

Peter FitzHerbert, also known as Piers FitzHerbert, (died 1235) Lord of Blenlevenny, was a 13th-century nobleman and Sheriff of Yorkshire. FitzHerbert was one of the Counsellors named in Magna Carta in 1215. He was the son of Herbert FitzHerbert and Lucy of Hereford.

== Life ==
FitzHerbert was the son of Herbert FitzHerbert and Lucy of Hereford, daughter of Miles of Gloucester, 1st Earl of Hereford and Sibyl de Neufmarché. FitzHerbert gained the title of Lord of the Honour of Brecknock and was made Governor of Pickering Castle, Yorkshire and the Sheriff of Yorkshire by King John of England. FitzHerbert is listed as one of the Counsellors named in Magna Carta in 1215. He inherited, through his mother, a third interest in the barony of Miles Fitz Walter of Gloucester in 1219. FitzHerbert's castles of Blenlevenny and Castell Dinas were sacked by Prince Llywelyn ab Iorwerth and Richard Marshal, 3rd Earl of Pembroke in October 1233. He died in 1235 and was buried at Reading Abbey, Yorkshire.

== Marriage and issue ==
FitzHerbert married Alice, the daughter of Robert fitzRoger, Lord of Warkworth and Clavering and Margaret de Chesney, they had the following issue:

- Herbert FitzPiers (died 1248), succeeded by his brother Reginald.
- Reginald FitzPiers, married firstly Alice, daughter and heir of William de Standford, had issue and married Joan, widow of Ingram de Percy, daughter and heir of William de Vivonne and Maud de Ferrers, had further issue.
- Lucy FitzPiers, married William de Ros of Helmsley, had issue.

He married secondly, Isabel, the widow of Roger Mortimer of Wigmore, the daughter of Walchelin de Ferriers of Oakham. They had no issue.
